= 2005 Belgian Super Cup =

2005 Belgian Supercup
Club Brugge	Germinal Beerschot
1	1
- Club Brugge won 4–2 on penalties
- Date: 30 July 2005
- Venue: Jan Breydel Stadium, Bruges
- Referee: Johan Verbist
- Attendance: 3,600

The 2005 Belgian Supercup was a football match between the winners of the previous season's 2004–05 Belgian First Division and 2004–05 Belgian Cup competitions. The match was contested by cup winners Germinal Beerschot and league champions Club Brugge on 30 July 2005 at the ground of the league champions as usual, in this case the Jan Breydel Stadium.

Club Brugge won its fourth consecutive Supercup title and 13th in total, as it beat Germinal Beerschot on penalty kicks.

== Details ==
30 July 2005
20:30 CEST

Club Brugge	1–1	Germinal Beerschot
Balaban 36'	Report	Messoudi 60'
Penalties
Balaban (penalty scored); Klukowski (penalty scored); De Cock (penalty scored); Leko (penalty scored)	4–2	(penalty missed) Monteyne; (penalty scored) Chimedza; (penalty missed) De Decker; (penalty scored) Öztürk

Jan Breydel Stadium, Bruges
Attendance: 3,600
Referee: Johan Verbist

Club Brugge	Germinal Beerschot

GK	1	(Croatia) Tomislav Butina
RB	32	(Belgium) Günther Vanaudenaerde		(substituted off) 79'
CB	26	(Belgium) Birger Maertens
CB	6	(Belgium) Philippe Clement
LB	5	(Canada) Michael Klukowski
RM	7	(Belgium) Gert Verheyen (c)
CM	8	(Belgium) Gaëtan Englebert
CM	3	(Belgium) Sven Vermant
LM	18	(Croatia) Ivan Leko
CF	14	(Croatia) Boško Balaban	(yellow card) 12'
CF	9	(Nigeria) Manasseh Ishiaku		(substituted off) 79'
Substitutes:
GK	23	(Belgium) Stijn Stijnen
RB	2	(Belgium) Olivier De Cock		(substituted on) 79'
DM	15	(Slovakia) Marek Špilár
CF	31	(Belgium) Kevin Roelandts
CF	29	(Belgium) Dieter Van Tornhout		(substituted on) 79'
RM	14	(Belgium) Grégory Dufer
CM	11	(Belgium) Jonathan Blondel
Manager:
(Belgium) Jan Ceulemans

GK	26	(Brazil) Luciano
RB	8	(Belgium) Kris De Wree
CB	4	(Belgium) Kurt Van Dooren
CB	17	(Croatia) Mario Cvitanović (c)
LB	5	(Belgium) Pieterjan Monteyne
RM	7	(Belgium) Karel Snoeckx		(substituted off) 59'
CM	12	(Belgium) Wim De Decker	(yellow card) 26'
CM	13	(Zimbabwe) Cephas Chimedza	(yellow card) 28'
LM	19	(Belgium) Mohamed Messoudi		(substituted off) 90'
CF	11	(Turkey) Sezer Öztürk
CF	9	(Belgium) Jurgen Cavens		(substituted off) 70'
Substitutes:
GK	1	(Belgium) Bram Verbist
CF	14	(Belgium) Prince Asubonteng	(yellow card) 71'	(substituted on) 59'
RM	24	(Guinea) Mohamed Camara		(substituted on) 90'
RB	6	(Belgium) Jonas De Roeck
CM	25	(Belgium) Dickson Agyeman
CM	10	(Belgium) Julien Kemajou		(substituted on) 70'
Manager:
(Belgium) Marc Brys

== See also ==
- 2005–06 Belgian First Division
- 2005–06 Belgian Cup
