= 2005 Belgian Cup final =

- Event: 2004–05 Belgian Cup
Club Brugge	Germinal Beerschot
1	2
- Date: 28 May 2005
- Venue: King Baudouin Stadium, Brussels
- Referee: Frank De Bleeckere
- Attendance: 40,000

The 2005 Belgian Cup final, took place on 28 May 2005 between Club Brugge and Germinal Beerschot. It was the 50th Belgian Cup final and was won by Germinal Beerschot.

== Route to the final ==
Club Brugge				Germinal Beerschot
Opponent	Result	Legs	Round	Opponent	Result	Legs
Eendracht Aalst (II)	3–0	3–0 away	Sixth round	Tongeren (III)	2–0	2–0 away
Olympic Charleroi (III)	4–0	4–0 home	Seventh round	Mons	1–0	1–0 away
La Louvière	5–4	2–2 home; 3–2 away	Quarter-finals	Genk	4–2	1–1 away; 3–1 home
Lierse	2–0	1–0 home; 1–0 away	Semi-finals	Lokeren	1–1 (away goals)	1–1 away; 0–0 home

== Match ==
=== Details ===
28 May 2005
20:30 CEST

Club Brugge	1–2	Germinal Beerschot
Verheyen 55'	Report	Snoeckx 23'; De Wree 56'

King Baudouin Stadium, Brussels
Attendance: 40,000
Referee: Frank De Bleeckere

Club Brugge	Germinal Beerschot

GK	1	(Croatia) Tomislav Butina
RB	25	(Belgium) Hans Cornelis	(yellow card) 88'
CB	26	(Belgium) Birger Maertens		(substituted off) 58'
CB	6	(Belgium) Philippe Clement
LB	18	(Canada) Michael Klukowski
RM	8	(Belgium) Gaëtan Englebert
CM	3	(Belgium) Timmy Simons (c)	(yellow card) 87'
LM	10	(Slovenia) Nastja Čeh
RW	7	(Belgium) Gert Verheyen	(yellow card) 84'
CF	19	(Norway) Rune Lange		(substituted off) 74'
LW	9	(Nigeria) Manasseh Ishiaku		(substituted off) 63'
Substitutes:
DF	4	(Czech Republic) David Rozehnal		(substituted on) 58'
FW	14	(Croatia) Boško Balaban		(substituted on) 63'
FW	29	(Belgium) Dieter Van Tornhout		(substituted on) 74'
GK	23	(Belgium) Stijn Stijnen
MF	31	(Belgium) Kevin Roelandts
Manager:
(Norway) Trond Sollied

GK	26	(Brazil) Luciano
RB	8	(Belgium) Kris De Wree
CB	3	(Belgium) Carl Hoefkens
CB	17	(Croatia) Mario Cvitanović
CB	4	(Belgium) Kurt Van Dooren
LB	5	(Belgium) Pieterjan Monteyne
RM	7	(Belgium) Karel Snoeckx	(yellow card) 88'
CM	12	(Belgium) Wim De Decker
CM	19	(Belgium) Mohamed Messoudi		(substituted off) 75'
LM	10	(Colombia) Daniel Cruz (c)
CF	9	(Belgium) Jurgen Cavens		(substituted off) 80'
Substitutes:
MF	25	(Belgium) Dickson Agyeman		(substituted on) 75'
FW	21	(Netherlands) Henk Vos		(substituted on) 80'
GK	1	(Belgium) Bram Verbist
FW	14	(Ghana) Prince Asubonteng
FW	16	(Brazil) Cadu
DF	22	(Belgium) Kenny Thompson
Manager:
(Belgium) Marc Brys

Match rules

- 90 minutes.
- 30 minutes of extra time if necessary.
- Penalty shoot-out if scores still level.
- Seven named substitutes.
- Maximum of three substitutions.
