= 2004 Belgian Cup final =

- Event: 2003–04 Belgian Cup
Beveren	Club Brugge
2	4
- Date: 17 May 2004
- Venue: King Baudouin Stadium, Brussels
- Referee: Johny Ver Eecke
- Attendance: 40,000

The 2004 Belgian Cup final, took place on 17 May 2004 between Beveren and Club Brugge. It was the 49th Belgian Cup final and was won by Club Brugge.
A record 12 Ivorian players were involved in the Final for Beveren (10 starters and 2 subs), while Björn Vleminckx was the only Belgian who played for the runners-up.

== Route to the final ==
Beveren				Club Brugge
Opponent	Result	Legs	Round	Opponent	Result	Legs
Hamme (II)	3–1	3–1 away	Sixth round	Sporting West Harelbeke (II)	3–1	3–1 away
Westerlo	1–1 (5–4 pen.)	1–1 away	Seventh round	Gent	2–0	2–0 home
Germinal Beerschot	3–1	2–1 away; 1–0 home	Quarter-finals	La Louvière	3–2	1–2 away; 2–0 home
Anderlecht	1–1 (away goals)	1–1 away; 0–0 home	Semi-finals	Mouscron	3–2	2–2 away; 1–0 home

== Match ==
=== Details ===
17 May 2004
16:00 CEST

Beveren	2–4	Club Brugge
Verlinden 38' (o.g.); Maertens 61' (o.g.)	Report; Youtube	Verheyen 34'; Čeh 46'; Mendoza 75'; Van Der Heyden 79'

King Baudouin Stadium, Brussels
Attendance: 40,000
Referee: Johny Ver Eecke

Beveren	Club Brugge

GK	1	(Ivory Coast) Copa (c)
RB	13	(Ivory Coast) Arthur Boka
CB	5	(Latvia) Igors Stepanovs
CB	17	(Ivory Coast) Emmanuel Eboué
LB	21	(Ivory Coast) Igor Lolo
RM	8	(Ivory Coast) Seydou Badjan Kanté		(substituted off) 81'
CM	2	(Ivory Coast) Armand Mahan		(substituted off) 80'
CM	18	(Ivory Coast) Marco Né
LM	23	(Ivory Coast) Abdoulaye Djire
CF	20	(Ivory Coast) Moussa Sanogo	Booked
CF	22	(Ivory Coast) Romaric		(substituted off) 81'
Substitutes:
MF	10	(Ivory Coast) Roméo Affessi		(substituted on) 80'
FW	15	(Belgium) Björn Vleminckx		(substituted on) 81'
MF	19	(Ivory Coast) Mohammed Diallo		(substituted on) 81'
Manager:
(Belgium) Herman Helleputte

GK	1	(Belgium) Dany Verlinden (c)
RB	26	(Belgium) Birger Maertens
CB	6	(Belgium) Philippe Clement
CB	4	(Czech Republic) David Rozehnal
LB	5	(Belgium) Peter Van Der Heyden
RM	8	(Belgium) Gaëtan Englebert		(substituted off) 82'
CM	3	(Belgium) Timmy Simons
LM	10	(Slovenia) Nastja Čeh		(substituted off) 89'
RF	7	(Belgium) Gert Verheyen	Booked
CF	19	(Norway) Rune Lange
LF	9	(Norway) Bengt Sæternes		(substituted off) 69'
Substitutes:
FW	18	(Peru) Andrés Mendoza		(substituted on) 69'
MF	36	(Belgium) Jonathan Blondel		(substituted on) 82'
MF	31	(Belgium) Kevin Roelandts		(substituted on) 89'
Manager:
(Norway) Trond Sollied

Match rules

- 90 minutes.
- 30 minutes of extra time if necessary.
- Penalty shoot-out if scores still level.
- Seven named substitutes.
- Maximum of three substitutions.
