= List of K.S.K. Beveren players =

This list includes football players who played for K.S.K. Beveren. The players are listed by country.

== Argentina ==
- (Argentina) Saúl Lisazo

== Belgium ==
- (Belgium) Marc Baecke
- (Belgium) Gilbert Bodart
- (Belgium) Peter Crève
- (Belgium) Pieter Collen
- (Belgium) Wim De Decker
- (Belgium) Geert De Vlieger
- (Belgium) Filip De Wilde
- (Belgium) Nathan D'Haemers
- (Belgium) Jean Janssens
- (Belgium) Paul Lambrichts
- (Belgium) Erwin Lemmens
- (Belgium) Dominique Lemoine
- (Belgium) Sandy Martens
- (Belgium) Tristan Peersman
- (Belgium) Jean-Marie Pfaff
- (Belgium) Karel Snoeckx
- (Belgium) Paul Theunis
- (Belgium) Stephan Van Der Heyden
- (Belgium) Wilfried Van Moer
- (Belgium) Björn Vleminckx

== Cameroon ==
- (Cameroon) Eugene Ekeke

== Congo ==
- (Republic of the Congo) Yannick Salem

== Croatia ==
- (Croatia) Krunoslav Jurcic

== England ==
- (England) David Fairclough

== Finland ==
- (Finland) Ismo Lius

== Gambia ==
- (The Gambia) Ebrahima Sawaneh

== Germany ==
- (Germany) Erwin Albert
- (Germany) Armin Görtz
- (Germany) Heinz Schönberger

== Guinea ==
- (Guinea) Souleymane Oularé

== Iceland ==
- (Iceland) Gudmundur Torfason

== Israel ==
- (Israel) Moshe Sinai

== Ivory Coast ==
- (Ivory Coast) Badjan
- (Ivory Coast) Boubacar Barry
- (Ivory Coast) Arthur Boka
- (Ivory Coast) Kafoumba Coulibaly
- (Ivory Coast) Abdoulaye Djire
- (Ivory Coast) Emmanuel Eboué
- (Ivory Coast) Gervinho
- (Ivory Coast) Igor Lolo
- (Ivory Coast) Marco Né
- (Ivory Coast) Ndri Romaric
- (Ivory Coast) Yaya Touré
- (Ivory Coast) Gilles Yapi Yapo
- (Ivory Coast) Venance Zézé

== Latvia ==
- (Latvia) Igors Stepanovs

== Lithuania ==
- (Lithuania) Tomas Danilevicius
- (Lithuania) Tomas Daumantas

== Macedonia ==
- (North Macedonia) Arben Nuhiji

== Mali ==
- (Mali) Mahamadou Dissa

== Madagascar ==
- (Madagascar) Younous Oumouri

== Morocco ==
- (Morocco) Khalid Fouhami

== Netherlands ==
- (Netherlands) Wim Hofkens
- (Netherlands) Edwin van Ankeren
- (Netherlands) Maurice van Ham
- (Netherlands) Peter Van Vossen
- (Netherlands) Eric Viscaal
- (Netherlands) Remco Torken

== Nigeria ==
- (Nigeria) Chidi Nwanu
- (Nigeria) Peter Rufai

== Norway ==
- (Norway) Egil Johansen

== Peru ==
- (Peru) German Leguia

== Poland ==
- (Poland) Marek Kusto
- (Poland) Marcin Zewlakow
- (Poland) Michal Zewlakow

== Rwanda ==
- (Rwanda) Jimmy Mulisa

== Sierra Leone ==
- (Sierra Leone) Mohamed Kanu

== Slovakia ==
- (Slovakia) Tibor Jancula
- (Slovenia) Saso Udovic

== Togo ==
- (Togo) Kuami Agboh
