= 2002 Belgian Cup final =

- Event: 2001–02 Belgian Cup
Club Brugge	Mouscron
3	1
- Date: 9 May 2002
- Venue: King Baudouin Stadium, Brussels
- Referee: Jacky Quaranta

The 2002 Belgian Cup final, took place on 9 May 2002 between Club Brugge and Mouscron. It was the 47th Belgian Cup final and was won by Club Brugge.

== Route to the final ==
Club Brugge				Mouscron
Opponent	Result	Legs	Round	Opponent	Result	Legs
Ourodenberg Aarschot (IV)	12–2	12–2 home	Sixth round	Bocholt (III)	7–1	7–1 home
Antwerp	1–1 (4–3 pen.)	1–1 away (4–3 pen.)	Seventh round	RWDM (II)	4–1	4–1 home
Beveren	1–0	1–0 home	Quarter-finals	Genk	5–2 (a.e.t.)	5–2 home (a.e.t.)
Lokeren	6–0	3–0 home, 3–0 away	Semi-finals	Sint-Truiden	5–2	3–0 home; 2–2 away

== Match ==
=== Details ===
9 May 2002
16:00 CEST

Club Brugge	3–1	Mouscron
Mendoza 22', 73', 89'	Report	Blondel 58'

King Baudouin Stadium, Brussels
Referee: Jacky Quaranta

Club Brugge	Mouscron

GK	1	(Belgium) Dany Verlinden
RB	25	(Belgium) Hans Cornelis
CB	22	(Belgium) Birger Maertens
CB	6	(Belgium) Philippe Clement		(substituted off) 24'
LB	5	(Belgium) Peter Van Der Heyden
RM	8	(Belgium) Gaëtan Englebert
CM	3	(Belgium) Timmy Simons
LM	11	(Belgium) Sandy Martens		(substituted off) 88'
RW	7	(Belgium) Gert Verheyen (c)
CF	19	(Norway) Rune Lange
LW	18	(Peru) Andrés Mendoza	Booked	(substituted off) 90'
Substitutes:
LF	9	(Croatia) Josip Šimić		(substituted on) 90'
LM	10	(Federal Republic of Yugoslavia) Bratislav Ristić		(substituted on) 88'
CM	24	(Belgium) Tim Smolders		(substituted on) 24'
Manager:
(Norway) Trond Sollied

GK	21	(Belgium) Franky Vandendriessche
RB	2	(Belgium) Alexandre Teklak
CB	12	(Belgium) Olivier Besengez
CB	7	(Belgium) Marco Casto	(yellow card) 82' (yellow-red card)
LB	3	(Poland) Michał Żewłakow
RM	9	(Belgium) Mbo Mpenza
CM	6	(Belgium) Koen De Vleeschauwer
CM	4	(Belgium) Steve Dugardein
LM	16	(Belgium) Christophe Grégoire
CF	11	(Croatia) Zoran Ban		(substituted off) 57'
CF	10	(Poland) Marcin Żewłakow
Substitutes:
CM	22	(Belgium) Jonathan Blondel		(substituted on) 57'
Manager:
(Belgium) Hugo Broos

Match rules

- 90 minutes.
- 30 minutes of extra time if necessary.
- Penalty shoot-out if scores still level.
- Seven named substitutes.
- Maximum of three substitutions.
