= 2004 Belgian Super Cup =

2004 Belgian Supercup
Anderlecht	Club Brugge
0	2
- Date: 22 December 2004
- Venue: Constant Vanden Stock Stadium, Anderlecht
- Referee: Johny Ver Eecke
- Attendance: 8,500

The 2004 Belgian Supercup was a football match between the winners of the previous season's 2003–04 Belgian First Division and 2003–04 Belgian Cup competitions: cup winners Club Brugge and league champions Anderlecht.

The match was played on 22 December 2004 at the ground of the league champions as usual, in this case the Constant Vanden Stock Stadium.

Club Brugge won its twelfth supercup in total, beating Anderlecht 2-0 through goals by Sebastian Hermans and Rune Lange.

Following 2004, no cup winner won the supercup until Union Saint-Gilloise did so in 2024.

== Details ==
22 December 2004
20:30 CEST

Anderlecht	0–2	Club Brugge
		Hermans 9'; Lange 82'

Constant Vanden Stock Stadium, Anderlecht
Attendance: 8,500
Referee: Johny Ver Eecke

Anderlecht	Club Brugge

GK	25	(Belgium) Jan Van Steenberghe
RB	6	(Poland) Michał Żewłakow	(substituted off) 64'
CB	27	(Belgium) Vincent Kompany
CB	30	(Finland) Hannu Tihinen
LB	3	(Belgium) Olivier Deschacht
RM	7	(Serbia and Montenegro) Goran Lovre	(substituted off) 64'
CM	4	(Belgium) Yves Vanderhaeghe
CM	21	(Sweden) Pär Zetterberg (c)	(substituted off) 72'
LM	36	(Belgium) Jonathan Legear
RF	9	(Belgium) Mbo Mpenza
LF	8	(Serbia and Montenegro) Nenad Jestrović
Substitutes:
RB	37	(Belgium) Anthony Vanden Borre	(substituted on) 64'
RF	25	(Ukraine) Oleg Iachtchouk	(substituted on) 64'
CB	34	(Burkina Faso) Lamine Traoré	(substituted on) 72'
Manager:
(Belgium) Hugo Broos

GK	23	(Belgium) Stijn Stijnen
CB	26	(Belgium) Birger Maertens
CB	3	(Belgium) Timmy Simons (c)
CB	4	(Czech Republic) David Rozehnal
RM	25	(Belgium) Hans Cornelis
CM	21	(Belgium) Sebastian Hermans	(substituted off) 76'
CM	11	(Belgium) Jonathan Blondel
LM	31	(Belgium) Kevin Roelandts
RW	7	(Belgium) Gert Verheyen	(substituted off) 70'
CF	19	(Norway) Rune Lange	(substituted off) 92'
LW	30	(Brazil) Victor	(substituted off) 63'
Substitutes:
RF	29	(Belgium) Dieter Van Tornhout	(substituted on) 70'
CB	6	(Belgium) Philippe Clement	(substituted on) 76'
CM	27	(Belgium) Vincent Provoost	(substituted on) 92'
CM	28	(Belgium) Bart Vlaeminck	(substituted on) 63'
Manager:
(Norway) Trond Sollied

== See also ==
- 2004–05 Belgian First Division
- 2004–05 Belgian Cup
- R.S.C. Anderlecht–Club Brugge KV rivalry
