= Djiré =

Djiré is both a given name and a surname. Notable people with the name include:

- Djiré Massourata (born 1984), Ivorian basketball player
- Abdoulaye Djiré (born 1981), Ivorian footballer
