= 2004–05 Belgian Cup =

Tournament details
- Country: Belgium

Final positions
- Champions: Beerschot
- Runners-up: Club Brugge

The 2004–05 Belgian Cup was the 50th season of the main knockout competition in Belgian association football.

After 10 rounds of play, Beerschot were crowned champions following a 2–1 win against Club Brugge in the final at the King Baudouin Stadium in Brussels.

== Overview ==
Clubs from the first division entered the competition in the round of 32. All rounds were played in one leg except for the quarter-finals and semi-finals.

Club Brugge were the defending champions having beaten Beveren 4–2 in the 2004 final at the King Baudouin Stadium in Brussels.

In the round of 32, Club Brugge began the defence of their title with a 3–0 win against Eendracht Aalst on 21 November 2004. On the same day, Beerschot defeated Tongeren 2–0.

The next round saw Beerschot defeat Mons 1–0 on 19 January 2005 while Club Brugge won 4–0 against Olympic Charleroi on the same day.

On 2 February 2005, the first legs of the quarter-finals took place. Club Brugge drew 2–2 with Louviéroise, Beerschot drew 1–1 with Genk, Charleroi defeated Lierse 3–1 and Lokeren won 2–1 against Gent.

The second legs were played between 16 March and 13 April. Lokeren defeated Gent 1–0 (3–1 on aggregate) and Lierse won 2–0 against Charleroi (3–3 on aggregate, Lierse advance on away goals) on 16 March. On 6 April, Club Brugge defeated Louviéroise 3–2 (5–4 on aggregate) and, on 13 April, Beerschot defeated Genk 3–1 after extra time (4–2 on aggregate).

On 20 April, the first legs of the semi-finals saw Club Brugge defeat Lierse 1–0 and Beerschot drew 1–1 with Lokeren. Club Brugge won 1–0 against Lierse in the second leg (2–0 on aggregate) on 10 May and, the following day, Beerschot drew 0–0 with Lokeren (1–1 on aggregate, Beerschot advanced on away goals).

== Bracket ==
Round of 32
Beerschot	2
Tongeren	0
Dender	1
Mons	2
Anderlecht	3
Bocholter	2
Kermt-Hasselt	0
Genk	5
Gent	2
RWDM Brussels	1
Sprimont-Comblain	0
Mouscron	1
STVV	1 (9)
Zulte Waregem	1 (8)
Deinze	1
Lokeren	4
Lierse	3
Oostende	1
Westerlo	2
Eupen	4
Standard Liège	4
Patro Eisden	1
RWS Bruxelles	1
Charleroi	2
Louviéroise	2
Denderhoutem	0
Antwerp	0
Beveren	1
Olympic Charleroi	1(3)
Cercle Brugge	1(1)
Aalst	0
Club Brugge	3

Round of 16
Beerschot	1
Mons	0
Anderlecht	1
Genk	2
Gent	1
Mouscron	0
STVV	1
Lokeren	2
Lierse	7
Eupen	0
Standard Liège	1(3)
Charleroi	1(4)
Louviéroise	3
Beveren	2
Olympic Charleroi	0
Club Brugge	4

Quarter-finals
Beerschot	1	3
Genk	1	1
Gent	1	0
Lokeren	2	1
Lierse	1	2
Charleroi	3	0
Louviéroise	2	2
Club Brugge	2	3

Semifinals
Beerschot	1	0
Lokeren	1	0
Lierse	0	0
Club Brugge	1	1

Final
Beerschot	2
Club Brugge	1

=== Final ===
Defending champions Club Brugge played Beerschot in the final at the King Baudouin Stadium in Brussels on 28 May 2005.

Karel Snoeckx gave Beerschot the lead midway through the first half. Gert Verheyen equalised 10 minutes into the second half but Beerschot regained the lead immediately afterwards through Kris De Wree and won the match 2–1.

28 May 2005
20:30 CEST

Club Brugge	1–2	Germinal Beerschot
Verheyen 55'	Report	Snoeckx 23'; De Wree 56'

King Baudouin Stadium, Brussels
Attendance: 40,000
Referee: Frank De Bleeckere
