= Bram Verbist =

Belgian footballer (born 1983)

Personal information
- Full name: Bram Verbist
- Date of birth: 5 March 1983 (age 43)
- Place of birth: Antwerp, Belgium
- Height: 1.83 m (6 ft 0 in)
- Position: Goalkeeper

Youth career
- 1994–1998: Beerschot
- 1998–1999: AA Gent

Senior career*
Years	Team	Apps	(Gls)
1999–2000	Germinal Beerschot	0	(0)
2000–2002	Ajax	0	(0)
2002–2006	Germinal Beerschot	35	(0)
2006–2007	Tienen	6	(0)
2007	→ Eendracht Aalst (loan)	0	(0)
2007–2014	Cercle Brugge	165	(0)
2014	Brøndby	0	(0)
2014–2016	Roda JC	37	(0)
- * Club domestic league appearances and goals

Bram Verbist (born 5 March 1983 in Antwerp) is a Belgian professional football goalkeeper.

== Career ==
At Germinal Beerschot, he used to be second choice after Brazilian goalie Luciano, who is now at Groningen. In 2006, Verbist made an unsuccessful move to Belgian second division team Tienen. Quite shortly after this move, he was loaned to Eendracht Aalst playing in Belgian Promotion A, the fourth level of Belgian football. But, even there, his performances were not left uncriticised.

In July 2007, however, Verbist received a ten-day trial at first division team Cercle Brugge, and then signed a contract with the green and black side for one year. In August 2013, one week before closure of the transfer period, Verbist was told by the board from Cercle that he quickly needed to find another team, because Cercle had loaned Joris Delle from Nice for one year. He failed to do that, and was "relegated" to fourth goalkeeper, after Joris Delle, Jo Coppens and Miguel Van Damme.

On 25 January 2014, Verbist signed a four-month contract with the Danish side Brøndby as a second keeper, due to an injured Michael Falkesgaard. On 28 June 2014, Verbist signed a two-year deal with Dutch Eerste Divisie side Roda JC.

== Coaching career ==
After retiring, Verbist was appointed goalkeeper coach at Beerschot under newly appointed manager Marc Brys. Verbist followed Brys to Sint.-Truidense ahead of the 2018–19 season. On 26 November 2019, Brys and his staff, including Verbist, was fired.
