= Luciano da Silva =

Luciano da Silva may refer to:

- Luciano José Pereira da Silva (born 1980), Brazilian footballer
- Luciano da Silva (Triguinho) (born 1979), Brazilian footballer
