= Mario Cvitanović =

Croatian football manager (born 1975)

Personal information
- Date of birth: 6 May 1975 (age 51)
- Place of birth: Zagreb, SR Croatia, SFR Yugoslavia
- Height: 1.82 m (6 ft 0 in)
- Position: Defender

Youth career
- Radnik Velika Gorica

Senior career*
| Years | Team | Apps | (Gls) |
| 1995–2000 | Croatia Zagreb | 91 | (3) |
| 2000–2001 | Hellas Verona | 16 | (0) |
| 2001–2002 | Venezia | 7 | (0) |
| 2002–2003 | Genoa | 33 | (0) |
| 2003–2004 | Napoli | 9 | (0) |
| 2004–2006 | Germinal Beerschot | 46 | (2) |
| 2006–2007 | Dinamo Zagreb | 17 | (2) |
| 2007–2009 | Energie Cottbus | 71 | (0) |
| Total | | 290 | (7) |

International career
| 1998–1999 | Croatia B | 2 | (0) |
| 1998–2001 | Croatia | 9 | (0) |

Managerial career
- 2016–2017: Dinamo Zagreb II
- 2017–2018: Dinamo Zagreb
- 2019: Al-Wehda
- 2022–2023: Šibenik
- 2025: Lokomotiva
- 2025–2026: Sarajevo
- * Club domestic league appearances and goals

Mario Cvitanović (pronounced [tsʋitǎːnoʋitɕ, - tsʋǐta-]; born 6 May 1975) is a Croatian professional football manager and former player who played as a defender.

== Club career ==
In 1995, Cvitanović started his career in the Croatian capital, where he won five consecutive national championships with Dinamo Zagreb (formerly Croatia Zagreb). He then spent four seasons in the Italian league, playing for Hellas Verona, Venezia, Genoa and Napoli before moving to Belgian side Germinal Beerschot, where he won the Belgian Cup in the 2004–05 season. Following two seasons in the Belgian league, Cvitanović re-joined Dinamo for their 2006–07 Champions League campaign, before leaving after their early exit on a free transfer to German side Energie Cottbus. Cvitanović played three seasons with Cottbus until being released in 2009 and subsequently retiring.

== International career ==
Cvitanović made his debut for Croatia in an October 1998 European Championship qualification match away against Malta, coming on as a 88th-minute substitute for Robert Jarni, and earned a total of 9 caps, scoring no goals. His final international was a March 2001 World Cup qualification match against Latvia.

== Managerial career ==
=== Dinamo Zagreb ===
Cvitanović coached Dinamo Zagreb II in the Croatian Second Football League from 2016 to 2017. On 13 July 2017, he signed a one-year contract as manager of the Dinamo Zagreb first team, succeeding Ivaylo Petev. Cvitanović left Dinamo Zagreb in March 2018 following two successive defeats from rivals Rijeka and feeder-club Lokomotiva, both of which were by a score of 4–1.

=== Al-Wehda ===
On 2 July 2019, Cvitanović was appointed manager of Saudi Pro League club Al-Wehda.

=== Šibenik ===
In September 2022, Cvitanović was appointed manager of Šibenik, replacing Damir Čanadi. He was ultimately replaced by Čanadi on 31 January 2023.

=== Lokomotiva ===
Cvitanović joined Lokomotiva on 24 April 2025 during the tail end of the 2024–25 season. He left the club at the end of the season.

=== Sarajevo ===
On 30 September 2025, Cvitanović was announced as the new manager of Bosnian Premier League club Sarajevo, signing a two-year contract. His first game in charge of Sarajevo ended in a 1–1 home draw against Zrinjski Mostar on 6 October 2025. On 24 October, Cvitanović secured his first win as Sarajevo manager against Sloga Doboj. After a seven-game unbeaten run in all competitions, he suffered his first defeat as Sarajevo lost to Rudar Prijedor 2–1 away on 22 November 2025. In his first Sarajevo derby, Cvitanović's side defeated fierce rivals Željezničar 4–0 at home on 7 December 2025. On 4 June 2026, the club announced Cvitanović's departure from the club.

== Personal life ==
On 21 September 2017, Cvitanović was severely beaten by two masked assailants in front of his apartment in Zagreb, Croatia.

== Managerial statistics ==
As of match played 25 May 2026

Managerial record by team and tenure
| Team | From | To | Record | | | | | | | |
| Team | From | To | G | W | D | L | GF | GA | GD | Win % |
|---|---|---|---|---|---|---|---|---|---|---|
| Dinamo Zagreb | 13 July 2017 | 10 March 2018 | 32 | 21 | 8 | 3 | 68 | 30 | +38 | 65.63 |
| Al-Wehda | 2 July 2019 | 16 September 2019 | 3 | 1 | 0 | 2 | 3 | 5 | −2 | 33.33 |
| Šibenik | 25 September 2022 | 31 January 2023 | 7 | 1 | 1 | 5 | 5 | 11 | −6 | 14.29 |
| Lokomotiva | 24 April 2025 | 31 May 2025 | 5 | 1 | 3 | 1 | 6 | 4 | +2 | 20.00 |
| Sarajevo | 30 September 2025 | 4 June 2026 | 32 | 18 | 7 | 7 | 47 | 24 | +23 | 56.25 |
| Total | | | 79 | 42 | 19 | 18 | 129 | 74 | +55 | 53.16 |

== Honours ==
=== Player ===
Dinamo Zagreb

- Croatian First League: 1995–96, 1996–97, 1997–98, 1998–99, 1999–2000, 2006–07
- Croatian Cup: 1995–96, 1996–97, 1997–98
- Croatian Super Cup: 2006

Germinal Beerschot

- Belgian Cup: 2004–05
