= Dickson Agyeman =

Belgian footballer

Personal information
- Full name: Dickson Agyemang
- Date of birth: 14 September 1985 (age 41)
- Place of birth: Antwerp, Belgium
- Height: 1.65 m (5 ft 5 in)
- Position: Defensive midfielder

Senior career*
Years	Team	Apps	(Gls)
2001-2003	Berchem Sport	36	(1)
2003–2007	Beerschot	63	(2)
2007–2009	Eindhoven	66	(1)
2009–2010	Mons		
2011–2012	FF Jaro	49	(0)
2012	TPS	6	(0)
2013–2015	Berchem Sport	24	(0)
2016–2017	KFC Antonia		
- * Club domestic league appearances and goals

Dickson Agyeman (born 14 September 1985) is a Belgian retired football midfielder.

== Career ==
Agyeman, with a Ghanaian mother and American father, grew up in the United States and moved to Belgium at 8 years of age. He played for Berchem Sport from 1995 until 1999 and from 1999 to 2007 by Germinal Beerschot. In 2007, FC Eindhoven signed him on a two-year contract from K.F.C. Germinal Beerschot during the summer and turned back to Belgium in Summer 2009 to sign with R.A.E.C. Mons. In February 2011 he signed a two-year contract with FF Jaro. He returned to Berchem Sport in 2013.

After injury cut short his career, he opened a gym in Wijnegem.

=== Attributes ===
His game style resembles that of Edgar Davids.

== Statistics ==
Season	club	land	games	goals	league
2003/04	K.F.C. Germinal Beerschot	Belgium	15	0	Jupiler League
2004/05	K.F.C. Germinal Beerschot	Belgium	16	0	Jupiler League
2005/06	Germinal Beerschot	Belgium	21	2	Belgian Second Division
2006/07	Germinal Beerschot	Belgium	11	0	Belgian Second Division
2007/08	FC Eindhoven	Netherlands	30	0	Eerste Divisie
2008/09	FC Eindhoven	Netherlands	36	1	Eerste Divisie
Total			129	3	

== Honours ==
=== Club ===
Beerschot A.C.

- Belgian Cup: 2004–05
