= Pieter-Jan Monteyne =

Belgian footballer (born 1983)

Personal information
- Date of birth: 1 January 1983 (age 43)
- Place of birth: Roeselare, Belgium
- Height: 1.77 m (5 ft 9 1/2 in)
- Position: Left back

Senior career*
Years	Team	Apps	(Gls)
2000–2001	Roeselare	29	(0)
2001–2011	Germinal Beerschot	305	(4)
2011–2014	Mons	100	(2)
2014–2015	Mouscron-Péruwelz	46	(0)
2015–2017	OH Leuven	1	(0)
2017–2018	Roeselare	3	(0)
2018–2019	Hamme		
- * Club domestic league appearances and goals

Pieter-Jan Monteyne (born 1 January 1983, in Roeselare) is a retired Belgian football left back.

== Personal ==
He is the older brother of Martijn Monteyne.

== Honours ==
=== Club ===
Beerschot A.C.

- Belgian Cup: 2004–05
