= Kurt Van Dooren =

Belgian footballer (born 1978)

Personal information
- Full name: Kurt Van Dooren
- Date of birth: 3 August 1978 (age 48)
- Place of birth: Brasschaat, Belgium
- Height: 1.83 m (6 ft 0 in)
- Position: Centre back

Team information
- Current team: K.S.K. Heist

Youth career
- Lierse S.K.

Senior career*
Years	Team	Apps	(Gls)
	Hoogstraten	-	(-)
2002–2003	K. Berchem Sport	-	(-)
2003–2010	Germinal Beerschot	199	(2)
2010	Lierse S.K.	15	(0)
2011–	K.S.K. Heist	10	(1)
- * Club domestic league appearances and goals as of 17 July 2009

Kurt Van Dooren (born 3 August 1978) is a Belgian football player currently playing for K.S.K. Heist.

== Honours ==
=== Club ===
Beerschot A.C.

- Belgian Cup: 2004–05
