= Kožušany-Tážaly =

- Municipality
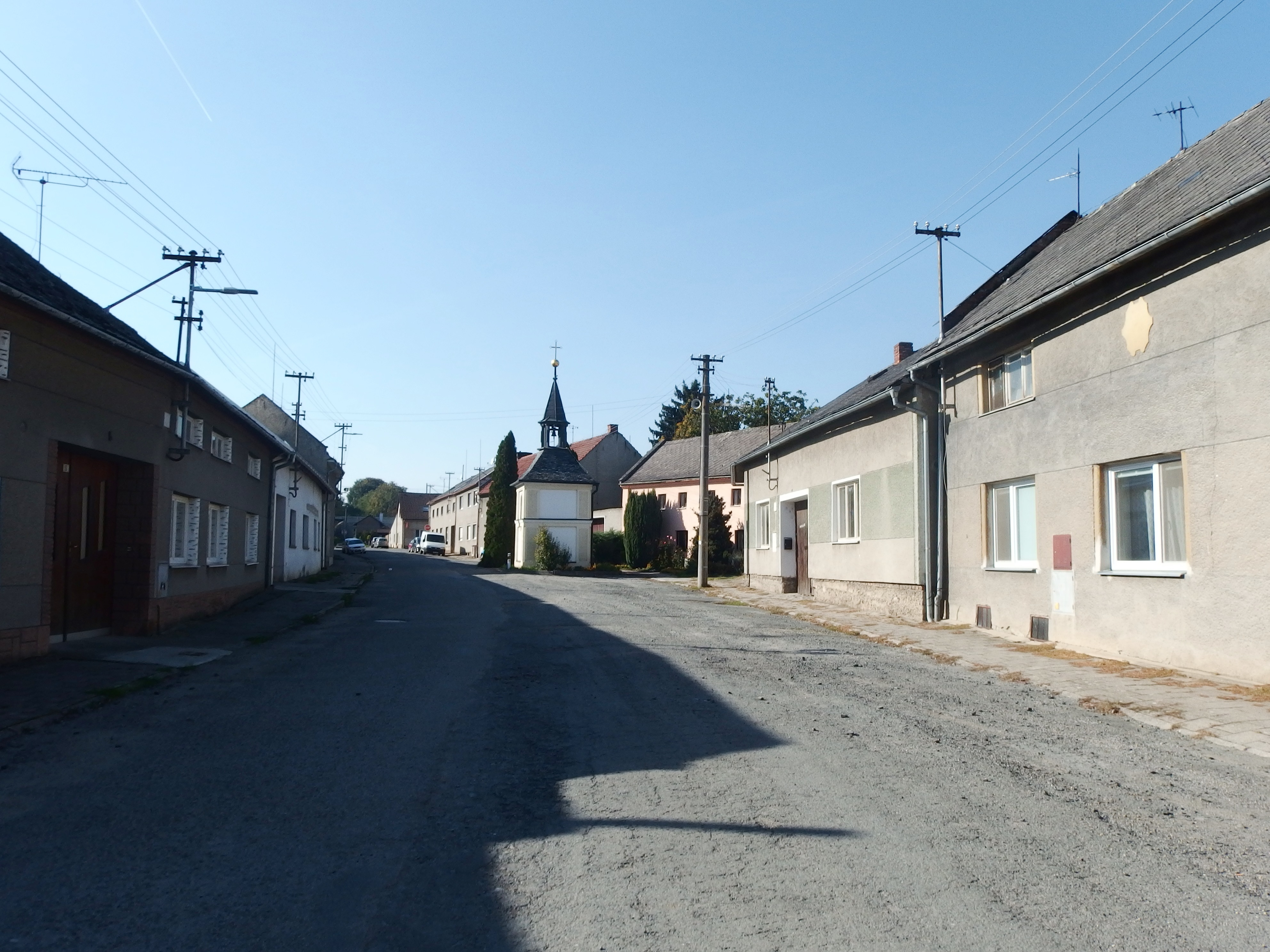
- Centre of Tážaly

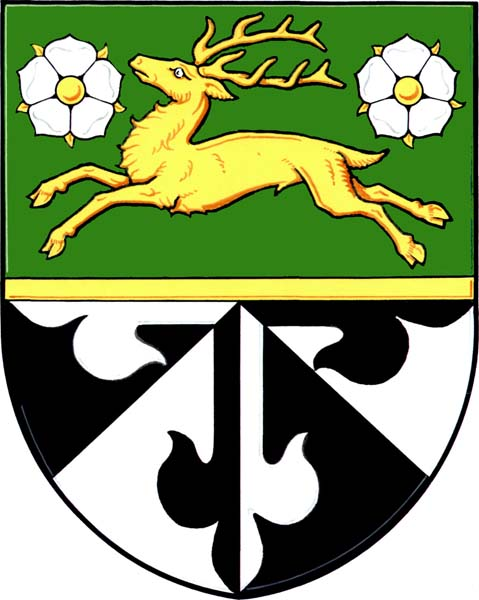
- Flag Coat of arms

- Location in the Czech Republic
- Coordinates: 49°32′23″N 17°15′14″E
- Country: Czech Republic
- Region: Olomouc
- District: Olomouc
- First mentioned: 1078

Area
  - Total: 6.27 km^{2} (2.42 sq mi)
- Elevation: 227 m (745 ft)

Population (2026-01-01)
  - Total: 862
  - Density: 137/km^{2} (356/sq mi)
- Time zone: UTC+1 (CET)
  - Summer (DST): UTC+2 (CEST)
- Postal code: 783 78
- Website: www.kozusanytazaly.cz

Kožušany-Tážaly is a municipality in Olomouc District in the Olomouc Region of the Czech Republic. It has about 900 inhabitants.

== Administrative division ==
Kožušany-Tážaly consists of two municipal parts (in brackets population according to the 2021 census):

- Kožušany (528)
- Tážaly (307)

== Geography ==
Kožušany-Tážaly is located about 4 kilometres (2 mi) south of Olomouc. It lies in a flat agricultural landscape in the Upper Morava Valley. The municipality is situated on the right bank of the Morava River.

== History ==
The first written mention of Tážaly is from 1078, making it one of the oldest villages in the region. Kožušany was first mentioned in 1297. From 1568 to 1782, both villages were owned by the St. Catherine Monastery in Olomouc. Kožušany and Tážaly remained separate municipalities until 1960, when they were merged.

In 1880, a primary school was built in Kožušany.

== Demographics ==
Historical population

| Year | Pop. | ±% |
|---|---|---|
| 1869 | 668 | — |
| 1880 | 703 | +5.2% |
| 1890 | 778 | +10.7% |
| 1900 | 769 | −1.2% |
| 1910 | 830 | +7.9% |

| Year | Pop. | ±% |
|---|---|---|
| 1921 | 826 | −0.5% |
| 1930 | 839 | +1.6% |
| 1950 | 683 | −18.6% |
| 1961 | 761 | +11.4% |
| 1970 | 747 | −1.8% |

| Year | Pop. | ±% |
|---|---|---|
| 1980 | 795 | +6.4% |
| 1991 | 773 | −2.8% |
| 2001 | 803 | +3.9% |
| 2011 | 822 | +2.4% |
| 2021 | 835 | +1.6% |

Source: Censuses

== Transport ==
The D35 motorway runs along the northern municipal border just outside the municipality.

Kožušany is located on the railway line Kouty nad Desnou–Nezamyslice via Olomouc.

== Sights ==
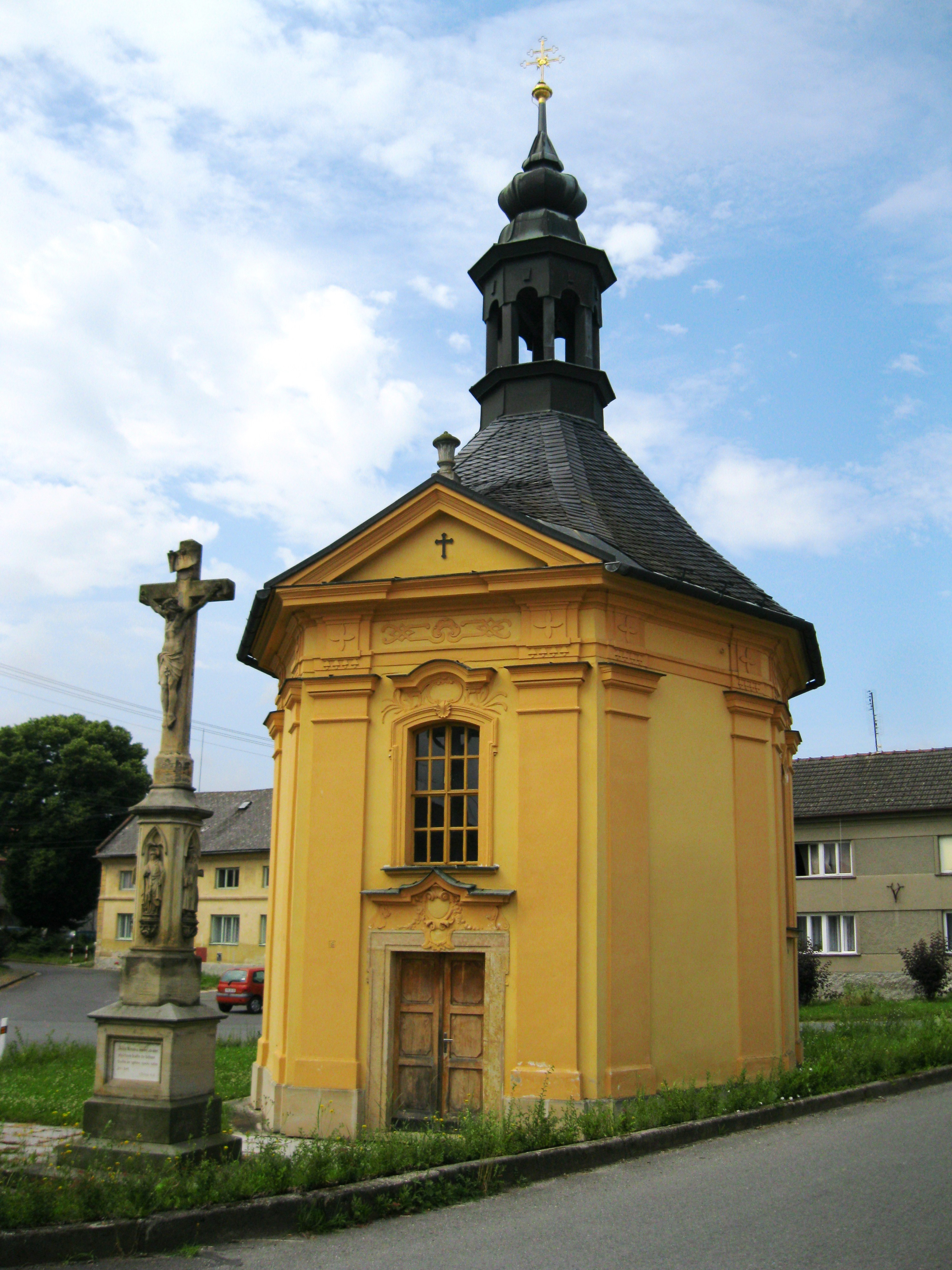
Chapel of Saint Anne

The most important monument is the Chapel of Saint Anne in Kožušany. It was built in the Baroque style in 1750.

== Notable people ==
- David Rozehnal (born 1980), footballer; raised here and lives here
