= Tomas Daumantas =

Lithuanian footballer

Personal information
- Date of birth: 30 August 1975 (age 51)
- Place of birth: Plungė, Lithuania
- Height: 1.82 m (5 ft 11 1/2 in)
- Position: Midfielder

Team information
- Current team: Patro Eisden Maasmechelen

Senior career*
| Years | Team | Apps | (Gls) |
| 1992–1993 | Schalke 04 II | 0 | (0) |
| 1993–1995 | Beveren | 10 | (0) |
| 1995–1996 | Austria Wien | 17 | (0) |
| 1996–1997 | Beveren | 0 | (0) |
| 1997 | Club Brugge | 0 | (0) |
| 1998–1999 | Ingelmunster | 43 | (11) |
| 1999–2001 | Club Brugge | 0 | (0) |
| 2001–2003 | MVV | 64 | (6) |
| 2003–2004 | Concordia Ihrhove | 5 | (1) |
| 2004–2005 | Sportfreunde Siegen | 16 | (0) |
| 2005–2006 | Fortuna Sittard | 23 | (0) |
| 2006–2007 | FC Vilnius | 0 | (0) |
| 2007–2008 | Excelsior Veldwezelt | 29 | (1) |
| 2008-2010 | Spouwen-Mopertingen | 53 | (11) |
| 2010-2012 | Patro Eisden | 55 | (3) |

International career
| 2002 | Lithuania | 2 | (0) |

Managerial career
- 2013-2015: Patro Eisden (asst.)
- 2015-2022: Eendracht Termien
- 2022-2024: Tongeren
- * Club domestic league appearances and goals

Tomas Daumantas (born 30 August 1975) is a Lithuanian retired footballer who played the moajority of his career in Belgium. He also has Belgian citizenship.

== International career ==
Daumantas made his debut for Lithuania in a February 2002 friendly match at the Malta Rothmans Tournament against Moldova, coming on as a 46th-minute substitute for Darius Regelskis and earned his other cap at the same tournament against Jordan.

== Managerial career ==
In 2015 Daumantas was named manager of Eendracht Termien and he left them in January 2022. Daumantas then succeeded Davy Heymans as manager of Tongeren in summer 2022 but was sacked in February 2024 and replaced by Alexandre Di Gregorio.
