= Timmy Simons =

Belgian footballer

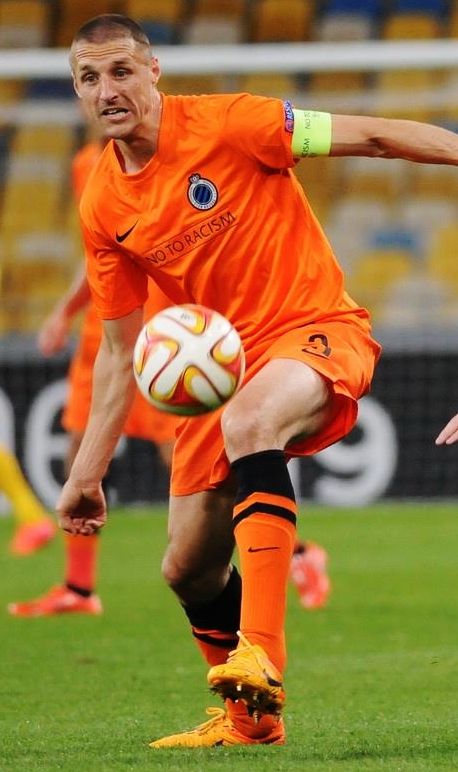
- Simons with Brugge in 2015

Personal information
- Date of birth: 11 December 1976 (age 49)
- Place of birth: Diest, Belgium
- Height: 1.86 m (6 ft 1 in)
- Positions: Defensive midfielder; centre-back; sweeper

Team information
- Current team: Genk (head coach)

Youth career
- –1988: Klein Kempen Bekkevoort
- 1988–1994: KTH Diest

Senior career*
| Years | Team | Apps | (Gls) |
| 1994–1998 | KTH Diest | 82 | (2) |
| 1998–2000 | Lommel | 64 | (5) |
| 2000–2005 | Club Brugge | 163 | (23) |
| 2005–2010 | PSV Eindhoven | 158 | (14) |
| 2010–2013 | 1. FC Nürnberg | 102 | (11) |
| 2013–2018 | Club Brugge | 167 | (16) |
| Total | | 736 | (71) |

International career
| 2001–2016 | Belgium | 94 | (6) |

Managerial career
- 2018–2019: Club Brugge (assistant)
- 2019–2020: Club Brugge (U16 manager)
- 2020–2021: Zulte Waregem (assistant)
- 2021–2022: Zulte Waregem
- 2023–2024: Dender EH
- 2024–2025: Westerlo
- 2026: OH Leuven
- 2026–: Genk
- * Club domestic league appearances and goals

Timmy Simons (born 11 December 1976) is a Belgian professional football coach and a former defensive midfielder who is currently head coach of belgian Pro League club Genk.

He was known for his tireless work ethic and penalty-taking ability, having scored 65 competitive goals through penalties, missing only 7. In 2012, at age 36, Simons was both the outfield player with the most minutes and the most kilometres in the Bundesliga. Simons' former clubs include Lommel, Club Brugge, PSV Eindhoven and 1. FC Nürnberg. He captained both Club Brugge and PSV Eindhoven, and won the Belgian Golden Shoe in 2002 while playing for Club Brugge.

In addition, he is also one of a select number of players who have amassed over 1,000 career appearances (the first Belgian to achieve the feat, since the time matches are recorded).

== Club career ==
=== Early career ===
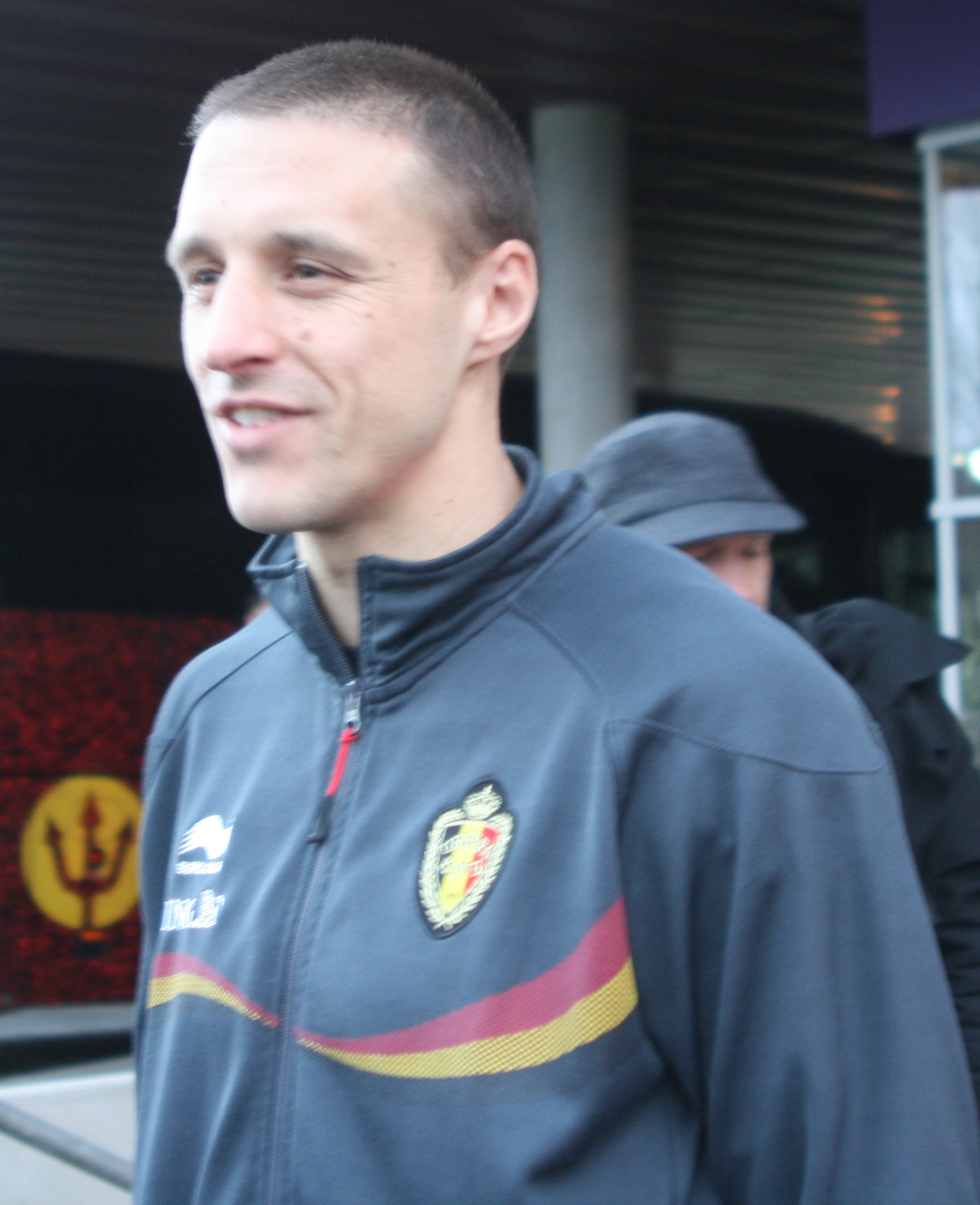
Simons with Belgium in 2006

Simons' career started with KTH Diest, the team where he received his training. In 1998 he left for first division Lommel SK, where he quickly established himself in the first team. After a strong second season at Lommel, he moved to Club Brugge in 2000. Simons immediately forced a place in the first team in the 2000–01 season.

He grew into a fixture at this Belgian club in no time, quickly growing into the team's penalty taker and, after a few seasons, the captain. In 2002 he was also named as player of the season. With Club Brugge, he became a two-time Belgium national champion and won the Belgian Cup on two occasions.

=== PSV ===
Simons was signed from Club Brugge on 29 June 2005, succeeding Mark van Bommel, who left for Barcelona. Before Simons went to PSV, he also negotiated with Feyenoord, on the advice of Bart Goor. Feyenoord, however, found difficult to meet the asking price and moved the transfer on the long-term after the resignation of head coach Ruud Gullit. Club Brugge, therefore, stopped the negotiations. Simons immediately won a starting place at PSV. With PSV he became champion of the Netherlands in the 2005–06 season. Simons soon became the penalty taker of PSV, as he had previously at Club Brugge. In the Eredivisie match against NAC Breda, he missed one of his first penalties in his career. Simons commented: "It was good that it was a wrong penalty, I still have some peace with it".

In his second year at PSV, Simons was once again an integral part of PSV. Of the total 49 matches that PSV played in the domestic league, Champions League, Super Cup and Cup, Simons played 48. Each time, he played the full 90 minutes, becoming an important part of the 2006–07 championship-winning side. After the departure of Phillip Cocu, he was appointed the captain of PSV in the 2007–08 season.

In PSV's game against Willem II on 6 October 2007, the PSV fans showed their affection towards Simons. The entire West stand was wrapped in the Belgian flag and a banner was unfurled with the text: "Captain Simons: Our Lion of Flanders". Simons once again became champion of the Netherlands with PSV in the 2007/2008 season. His fourth title in a row. He scored four times in the 2007–08 season. Together with goalkeeper Heurelho Gomes, Simons played the most minutes for PSV, they both missed only one league game and played the other 33 from the beginning to the end. The defensive midfielder got a solitarily yellow card and not a red card, in the UEFA Cup match against Tottenham Hotspur, he received a yellow card, raising the total amount to six yellow cards in 140 official matches for PSV in his first three seasons.

In his last season at PSV, Simons lost his starting place to youngster Ibrahim Afellay. Since PSV was in financial trouble and he was one of the big earners of the team, PSV decided to sell Simons on a free transfer to 1. FC Nürnberg.

=== 1. FC Nürnberg ===
With his new German team, Simons became very important, both with his leadership qualities and his great playing ability. For two seasons Simons was the player who played the most in the Bundesliga. In the 2010–11 season, he did not miss a minute. Because of his excellent results, he came to the attention of his old Club Brugge team but also of R.S.C. Anderlecht. Simons quieted those speculations by extending his contract until 2014. In three season with Nürnberg, he finished 6th, 10th and 10th in the Bundesliga.

=== Return to Brugge ===
On 12 June 2013, Simons signed a two-year contract with the option of staying in a technical position at Club Brugge. During the first match of the 2013–14 season, Simons made his comeback for the club. He got a questionable red card on matchday 1 after 21 minutes after a foul on Charleroi player Ederson. On 15 May 2016, as captain, he lifted the Belgian title in the air after a 4–0 victory against RSC Anderlecht. He played his 1000th match as a professional football player against AA Gent on 29 January 2017. The club lost that match 2–0.

On 13 May 2018, after receiving his seventh title as a player, Simons announced that he was putting an end to his active playing career. He received a wildcard from the board of Club Brugge, meaning he can take up a position in the future in the context of the club.

== International career ==
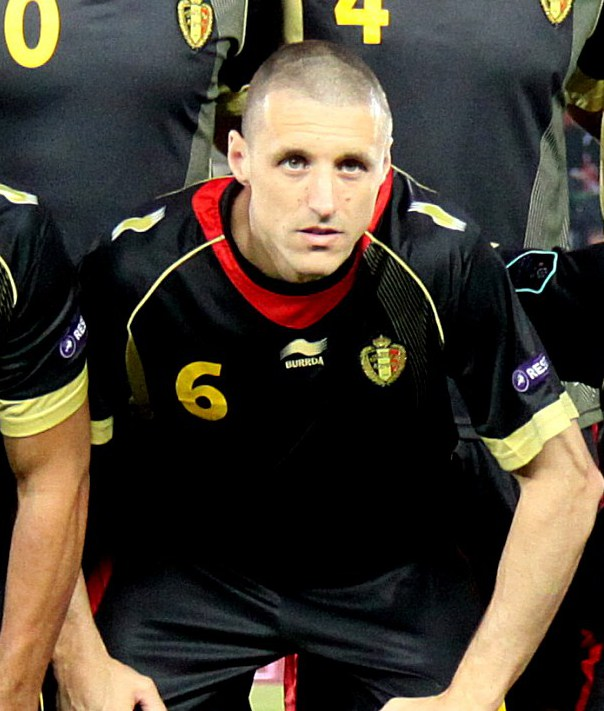
Simons playing for Belgium in 2011

Simons made his debut on 30 April 2001 for the Belgium national team in a friendly match away against the Czech Republic, alongside Peter Van der Heyden. He was a regular for the national team and under coach René Vandereycken he became captain. But under Dick Advocaat he was pushed aside. From his first team selection the "somewhat older" Simons was dropped. And the matches after that Advocaat did not call back Simons either. From 2001 to 2011, Simons collected 88 caps. He was recalled under national coach Georges Leekens and also under the reign of Marc Wilmots.

After not being selected for the 2014 World Cup, Simons' international career seemed over. Prior to the first international match after this World Cup (a friendly match against Australia) he was honoured alongside Daniel Van Buyten for their merits with the national team. On 13 November 2016 Simons was called for the international match against Estonia, after the injury of Kabasele. In that match, he came on for seven minutes. This made him. at 39 years, 11 months and 2 days the oldest Red Devil ever in an official competition.

He is the tenth-most capped player of all time in the Belgium national football team (after Jan Vertonghen, Axel Witsel, Toby Alderweireld, Eden Hazard, Dries Mertens, Romelu Lukaku, Thibaut Courtois, Kevin De Bruyne and Jan Ceulemans), having earned 94 caps. He became the oldest capped player when, at age 39, 11 months and 2 days, he played against Estonia on 13 November 2016.

== Coaching career ==
On 1 July 2018, Club Brugge confirmed that Simons had been hired as assistant manager to Ivan Leko. In June 2019 Brugge confirmed, that Simons would continue at the club as head coach for the U16s.

On 19 April 2019 it was confirmed, that Simons had been hired as assistant coach for Zulte Waregem under manager Francky Dury from the upcoming season. On 17 December 2021, Dury was fired and Simons, assisted by former teammate Davy De fauw, was named manager for the rest of the season.

In February 2023, Simons was appointed manager of Challenger Pro League side Dender EH. At the end of the season, Simons signed a new two-year contract with the club. He won promotion with Dender in the 2023–24 season which saw the club's return to the Belgian Pro League for the first time since 2009. After clinching that historic promotion, Simons left Dender to take the role of manager at Westerlo on 23 May 2024.

=== Managerial ===
As of match played 15 December 2022

| Team | Nat | From | To | Record | | | | | | | |
| Team | Nat | From | To | G | W | D | L | GF | GA | GD | Win % |
|---|---|---|---|---|---|---|---|---|---|---|---|
| Zulte Waregem | (Belgium) | 17 December 2021 | 30 June 2022 | 15 | 4 | 3 | 8 | 15 | 26 | −11 | 26.67 |
| Dender EH | (Belgium) | 13 February 2023 | 23 May 2024 | 28 | 14 | 8 | 6 | 46 | 29 | +17 | 50.00 |
| Total | | | | 43 | 18 | 11 | 14 | 61 | 55 | +6 | 41.86 |

== Honours ==
=== Player ===
Club Brugge

- Belgian First Division: 2002–03, 2004–05, 2015–16, 2017–18
- Belgian Cup: 2001–02, 2003–04, 2014–15
- Belgian Supercup: 2002, 2003, 2004, 2016
- Bruges Matins: 2001, 2004
- Jules Pappaert Cup: 2005

PSV Eindhoven

- Eredivisie: 2005–06, 2006–07, 2007–08
- Johan Cruyff Shield: 2008

Belgium

- FIFA Fair Play Trophy: 2002 World Cup

Individual

- Man of the Season (Belgian First Division): 2000–01
- Belgian Golden Shoe: 2002
- Belgian Professional Footballer of the Year: 2002–03
- Belgian Fair Play Award: 2002–03
- Golden Shoe Lifetime Achievement Award: 2017

=== Manager ===
FCV Dender EH

- Challenger Pro League runners-up: 2023–24

== See also ==
- List of men's footballers with the most official appearances
