= Mohamed Messoudi =

Belgian footballer

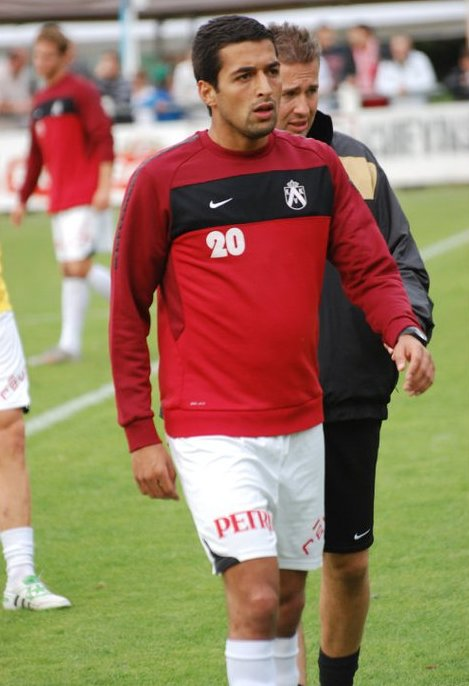
- Messoudi in 2011

Personal information
- Full name: Mohamed Messoudi
- Date of birth: 7 January 1984 (age 42)
- Place of birth: Wilrijk, Belgium
- Height: 1.78 m (5 ft 10 in)
- Position: Attacking midfielder

Team information
- Current team: Beerschot (head coach)

Senior career*
Years	Team	Apps	(Gls)
2002–2006	Germinal Beerschot	69	(6)
2006–2009	Willem II	73	(6)
2009–2012	Kortrijk	53	(6)
2012–2013	Gent	18	(0)
2013–2014	OH Leuven	28	(3)
2014–2015	Zulte Waregem	20	(3)
2015–2016	Raja Casablanca	3	(0)
2016–2019	K Beerschot VA	61	(10)
2019–2020	Lyra-Lierse	0	(0)

International career
2004–2006	Belgium U21	15	(1)

Managerial career
- 2021–2023: Westerlo (assistant)
- 2024–2025: Zulte Waregem (assistant)
- 2025–: Beerschot
- * Club domestic league appearances and goals

Mohamed "Mo" Messoudi (born 7 January 1984) is a Belgian football coach and a former player who is the head coach of Challenger Pro League club Beerschot.

== Club career ==
Messoudi is a player who has made his debut in professional football, being part of the Germinal Beerschot squad in the 2002–03 season, before joining Willem II Tilburg. After being released from Dutch side Willem II, the 25-year-old midfielder returned to Belgium, where he signed a one-year deal with KV Kortrijk.

In 2012, Messoudi moved to Belgian Pro League side Gent where he stayed one season before moving to OH Leuven. In July 2014, Messoudi punched a player in the face during a pre-season friendly match, prompting OH Leuven to fire him the next day. After being cleared from any further charges two weeks later, he signed for Zulte Waregem.

On 10 September 2019, Messoudi joined K Lyra-Lierse Berlaar.

== Coaching career ==
Messoudi served as an assistant coach at Westerlo and Zulte Waregem before taking on his first head coaching role at Challenger Pro League side Beerschot in June 2025.

== Honours ==
=== Club ===
Beerschot A.C.

- Belgian Cup: 2004–05
