= Sebastian Hermans =

Belgian footballer (born 1983)

Personal information
- Date of birth: 3 May 1983 (age 43)
- Place of birth: Belgium
- Position: Winger

Youth career
- 1989–1992: Londerzeel
- 1992–1996: KHO Merchtem-Brussegem
- 1996–2000: Eendracht Aalst

Senior career*
Years	Team	Apps	(Gls)
2000–2001	Eendracht Aalst	8	(2)
2001–2006	Club Brugge	2	(0)
2006–2008	KMSK Deinze	43	(10)
2008–2010	Hamme		
2010–2011	Lokeren-Temse		
2011–2012	HSV Hoek		
- * Club domestic league appearances and goals

Sebastian Hermans (born 3 May 1983) is a Belgian former footballer who played as a winger.

== Early life ==
Hermans was born in 1983 in Belgium. He was childhood friends with Belgian footballer Birger Van de Ven.

== Career ==
Hermans started his career with Belgian side Eendracht Aalst. In 2001, he signed for Belgian side Club Brugge KV. He helped the club win the 2004 Belgian Super Cup. In 2006, he signed for Belgian side KMSK Deinze. In 2008, he signed for Belgian side VW Hamme. In 2010, he signed for Belgian side Lokeren-Temse. In 2011, he signed for Dutch side HSV Hoek.

== Style of play ==
Hermans mainly operated as a winger. He was known for his work ethic.
