= Prince Asubonteng =

Ghanaian footballer

Personal information
- Full name: Prince Asubonteng
- Date of birth: 6 March 1986 (age 40)
- Place of birth: Kumasi, Ghana
- Height: 1.72 m (5 ft 8 in)
- Position: Forward

Youth career
- 2002–2003: Germinal Beerschot

Senior career*
Years	Team	Apps	(Gls)
2003–2006	Germinal Beerschot	36	(1)
2006–2007	Racing Ferrol	20	(2)
2008	Baza	9	(0)
2008–2010	Eindhoven	50	(3)
2010–2015	Dessel Sport	137	(31)
- * Club domestic league appearances and goals as of 12 October 2015

Prince Asubonteng (born 6 March 1986) is a Ghanaian footballer who last played for Dessel Sport of Belgium.

Asubonteng began his career at the age of 16 at Belgian club K.F.C. Germinal Beerschot. He was transferred to Racing de Ferrol of Spain in 2006, for which he played 20 games and scored 2 goals. In January 2008, he was sold to CD Baza, but left the club after six months to join former manager Marc Brys at FC Eindhoven.

== Career ==
Season	Club	Games	Goals
2002/03	K.F.C. Germinal Beerschot	2	0
2003/04	K.F.C. Germinal Beerschot	17	1
2004/05	K.F.C. Germinal Beerschot	9	0
2005/06	K.F.C. Germinal Beerschot	8	0
2006/07	Racing Club de Ferrol	14	2
2007/08	Racing Club de Ferrol	6	0
2007/08	CD Baza	9	0
2008/09	FC Eindhoven	36	2
2009/10	FC Eindhoven	14	1
Total Last stand: 30 August 2008		69	3
