= Mohamed Camara (footballer, born 1980) =

Guinean professional footballer

Personal information
- Date of birth: 21 October 1980 (age 46)
- Place of birth: Guinea
- Position: Midfielder

Senior career*
Years	Team	Apps	(Gls)
2001–2002	K.R.C. Zuid-West-Vlaanderen	20	(4)
2002–2005	Germinal Beerschot	64	(7)
2005–2006	Ethnikos Asteras	?	(?)
2006–2007	La Louvière	21	(2)
2007–2009	K.F.C. Dessel Sport	49	(3)
2009–2010	R.Geants Athois	16	(4)
- * Club domestic league appearances and goals

Mohamed Camara (born October 21, 1980) is a Guinean professional footballer who spent the majority of his playing career in Belgium, and also had a spell in Greece with Ethnikos Asteras.

== Playing career ==
Camara previously played for Germinal Beerschot in the Belgian First Division.

- 2005/2006 - Ethnikos Asteras
- 2005/2006 - Germinal Beerschot - 5/1
- 2004/2005 - Germinal Beerschot - 24/1
- 2003/2004 - Germinal Beerschot - 31/4
- 2002/2003 - Germinal Beerschot - 3/1
