= Alexandre Di Gregorio =

Belgian footballer and manager (born 1980)

Personal information
- Date of birth: 12 February 1980 (age 46)
- Place of birth: Liège, Belgium
- Height: 1.75 m (5 ft 9 in)
- Positions: Forward; midfielder

Youth career
- 1987–1990: RFC Liège
- 1990–1991: Templiers
- 1991–1995: RFC Liège
- 1995–1996: Seraing

Senior career*
Years	Team	Apps	(Gls)
1996–1999	Tilleur		
1999	Genk	0	(0)
2000	Visé		
2000–2001	Genk	6	(3)
2002–2004	Charleroi	17	(2)
2004–2007	Antwerp	96	(26)
2008–2010	RKC	32	(2)
2010–2011	Antwerp	27	(5)
2011–2012	Tienen	31	(8)
2012–2013	Eendracht Aalst	24	(4)
2013–2014	Verviers	33	(22)
2014–2015	Sprimont Comblain	23	(5)
2015–2017	Tilleur		
2017–2018	Heur-Tongeren		
2018–2023	RFC Union La Calamine		

Managerial career
- 2019–2023: RFC Union La Calamine (player-coach)
- 2023–2024: RFC Union La Calamine
- 2024–2025: Tongeren
- * Club domestic league appearances and goals

Alexandre Di Gregorio (born 12 February 1980) is a Belgian football manager and former player who played as a forward and midfielder.

== Playing career ==
Di Gregorio came through the youth system of RFC Liège in his home city and made his senior debut in 1997. The most prominent spell of his career came at Antwerp, whom he served over two periods and captained for three seasons, and with whom he earned a move to the Dutch Eredivisie with RKC Waalwijk. He also played for Genk and Charleroi in the Belgian top flight, and represented Belgium at youth level up to the under-21s. Later in his career he dropped into the lower divisions, finishing as the top scorer of the Third Division B with Verviers in 2013–14.

== Managerial career ==
Di Gregorio was named manager of Tongeren in February 2024, replacing Tomas Daumantas. He left the club again in November 2025.
