= Olivier Besengez =

Belgian footballer

Personal information
- Date of birth: 19 September 1971 (age 55)
- Place of birth: Doornik
- Position: Defender

Senior career*
Years	Team	Apps	(Gls)
1996–2007	R.E. Mouscron		
- * Club domestic league appearances and goals

Olivier Besengez (born 19 September 1971) is a retired Belgian football defender.
