= Djiré Massourata =

Ivorian basketball player

Personal information
- Born: November 11, 1984 (age 42)

Career history
- ?: Abidjan Basket Club

Djiré Massourata (born November 11, 1984) is an Ivorian female professional basketball player.
