= Kabasele =

Kabasele is a surname. Notable people with the surname include:

- Christian Kabasele (born 1991), Belgian footballer
- Nathan Kabasele (born 1994), Belgian footballer
- Joseph Athanase Tshamala Kabasele (1930−1983), known as Le Grand Kallé, musician, father of modern Congolese music, leader of African Jazz
