= Marco Casto =

Belgian footballer

Personal information
- Date of birth: 2 June 1972 (age 54)
- Place of birth: Haine-Saint-Paul
- Height: 1.75 m (5 ft 9 in)
- Position: Defender

Senior career*
| Years | Team | Apps | (Gls) |
| 1989–1997 | RSC Charleroi | 144 | (18) |
| 1997–2003 | R.E. Mouscron | 152 | (14) |
| 2003–2005 | RAEC Mons | 24 | (0) |
| 2005–2006 | UR Namur | | |
| 2006–2008 | R.Jeun. Aischoise | | |
- * Club domestic league appearances and goals

Marco Casto (born 2 June 1972) is a retired Belgian football defender.
