= Nastja Čeh =

Slovenian footballer (born 1978)

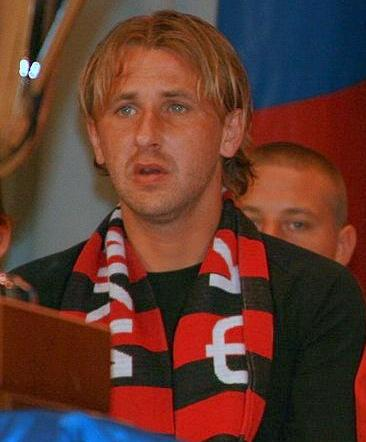
- Čeh in 2008

Personal information
- Date of birth: 26 January 1978 (age 48)
- Place of birth: Ptuj, SFR Yugoslavia
- Height: 1.81 m (5 ft 11 in)
- Position: Midfielder

Youth career
- Drava Ptuj

Senior career*
Years	Team	Apps	(Gls)
1995–1996	Drava Ptuj		
1996–1998	Maribor	65	(5)
1999	Olimpija	27	(6)
1999–2001	Maribor	48	(12)
2001–2005	Club Brugge	101	(24)
2005–2007	Austria Wien	36	(3)
2007–2008	Khimki	46	(6)
2008–2009	Panserraikos	6	(1)
2009–2010	Rijeka	7	(0)
2010–2011	Bnei Sakhnin	43	(4)
2011–2012	Maccabi Petah Tikva	4	(0)
2012–2013	PSMS Medan	14	(3)
2013–2014	Thanh Hoá	41	(15)
2014–2018	Drava Ptuj	105	(48)
Total		543	(127)

International career
1995–1997	Slovenia U18	3	(0)
1997–1998	Slovenia U20	3	(1)
1997–1999	Slovenia U21	13	(1)
2001–2007	Slovenia	46	(6)
- * Club domestic league appearances and goals

Nastja Čeh (born 26 January 1978) is a Slovenian former professional footballer who played as a midfielder. Born in Ptuj, he began his career at hometown club Drava before moving to Maribor, where he won two consecutive Slovenian First League titles. He is best known internationally for his time at Club Brugge (2001–2005), with whom he won two Belgian First Division titles and three Belgian Cups. He subsequently played for Austria Wien, FC Khimki, and clubs in Greece, Croatia, Israel, Indonesia, and Vietnam before retiring in 2018.

Čeh earned 46 caps for the Slovenia national team, scoring 6 goals, and represented the country at the 2002 FIFA World Cup.

== Club career ==
Čeh started his career with his hometown club Drava Ptuj. By the age of 17 he was playing in the first team in the 2. SNL. In the 1996–97 season he moved from Drava to Maribor, later spending one season at Olimpija before returning to Maribor.

Čeh then moved on to Club Brugge. His first season at the club brought success in the Belgian Cup, and the following season he helped the club win their twelfth league title. In August 2002 he scored a late equalising goal in the second-leg of Brugge's Champions League third round qualifying tie against Shakhtar Donetsk. Brugge then went on to qualify through a penalty shoot-out.

In 2005, Čeh was sold to Austria Wien. In 2007 he signed for the Russian Premier League side FC Khimki, where he was given the number 10 shirt.

On 5 January 2009, he left Khimki and moved to Greek club Panserraikos. After a short spell in Greece, he signed for Rijeka, spending a season there before moving on yet again to play in Israel.

In April 2012 Čeh signed for PSMS Medan (ISL) of the Indonesia Super League. His debut match was on 9 April, where he came on in the 53rd minute replacing Muhammad Antoni; he also received his first yellow card on that match.

== International career ==
Čeh made his debut for the Slovenia national team on 6 October 2001 in a 2002 FIFA World Cup qualifying match against the Faroe Islands. He scored twice on his international debut, helping Slovenia secure a 3–0 victory.

He subsequently participated in the 2002 FIFA World Cup, co-hosted by South Korea and Japan. Čeh came on as a substitute in two of Slovenia's three group stage matches, against Spain and Paraguay. He was sent off in the match against Paraguay, and Slovenia were eliminated in the group stage.

Čeh subsequently established himself as a regular midfielder for Slovenia. During the UEFA Euro 2004 qualifiers, he scored against Cyprus and Israel. However, Slovenia lost to Croatia in the play-offs and failed to qualify for the final tournament.

He continued to make regular appearances for the national team in 2004 and 2005, also participating in the 2006 FIFA World Cup qualifiers and the UEFA Euro 2008 qualifiers. His final international appearance came in June 2007 in a UEFA Euro 2008 qualifying match against Romania. Between 2001 and 2007, Čeh made 46 appearances for Slovenia, scoring six goals.

== Controversies ==
In April 2011, it was revealed by the Slovenian media that Maribor police department was, for the past six months, investigating an illegal betting organization and six individuals, four of which were from the Maribor area and had already been taken into custody. The Police also revealed that two other collaborators were still at large and that one of those was Goran Šukalo. Šukalo categorically denied his involvement in the matter and revealed that another football player, Nastja Čeh, was still owing him €73,000 and was avoiding payment. Allegedly this was the reason why Čeh pawned his property near Ptuj to Kosta Turner, which was visible from the official real estate papers. In January 2012, the general prosecutor on the District Court in Maribor proposed an indictment of six individuals, ring leaders of the illegal betting organization, in light of new evidence against them. The organization allegedly accepted a total of €43 million of bets, with €2.53 million being placed by Čeh.

== Career statistics ==
Scores and results list Slovenia's goal tally first, score column indicates score after each Čeh goal.

List of international goals scored by Nastja Čeh
No.	Date	Venue	Opponent	Score	Result	Competition
1	6 October 2001	Stadion Bežigrad, Ljubljana	Faroe Islands	1–0	3–0	2002 FIFA World Cup qualification
2	6 October 2001	Stadion Bežigrad, Ljubljana	Faroe Islands	2–0	3–0	2002 FIFA World Cup qualification
3	2 April 2003	Stadion Bežigrad, Ljubljana	Cyprus	4–1	4–1	UEFA Euro 2004 qualification
4	6 September 2003	Stadion Bežigrad, Ljubljana	Israel	3–1	3–1	UEFA Euro 2004 qualification
5	18 August 2004	Stadion Bežigrad, Ljubljana	Serbia and Montenegro	1–1	1–1	Friendly
6	4 June 2005	Dinamo Stadium, Minsk	Belarus	1–0	1–1	2006 FIFA World Cup qualification

== Honours ==
Maribor

- Slovenian First League: 1999–2000, 2000–01

Club Brugge

- Belgian First Division: 2002–03, 2004–05
- Belgian Cup: 2001–02, 2002–03, 2003–04
- Belgian Supercup: 2002, 2003, 2004, 2005

Austria Wien

- Austrian Bundesliga: 2005–06
- Austrian Cup: 2005–06

== See also ==
- Slovenian international players
- NK Maribor players
