= Mohammed Diallo =

Ivorian footballer (born 1983)

Mohammed Moujtaba Diallo
Personal information
- Full name: Mohammed Moujtaba Diallo H.A.
- Date of birth: 22 May 1983 (age 43)
- Place of birth: Marcory, Ivory Coast
- Height: 1.59 m (5 ft 3 in)
- Position: Attacking midfielder

Senior career*
Years	Team	Apps	(Gls)
2002	ASEC Mimosas		
2003–2006	Beveren	107	(6)
2006	Sion	13	(1)
2007	→ Maccabi Petah Tikva (loan)	8	(1)
2007–2008	→ Chiasso (loan)	27	(2)
2008–2009	FC Champagne Sports		
2009–2010	Ajax Cape Town	12	(0)
2010–2011	ES Fréjus	25	(3)
2011	Nantes	1	(0)
2012	Gazélec Ajaccio	13	(0)
2012–2014	Roye-Noyon	13	(1)

International career
2003	Ivory Coast	1	(0)
- * Club domestic league appearances and goals

Mohammed Diallo (born 22 May 1983) is an Ivorian former professional footballer who played as an attacking midfielder.

== Career ==
Born in Marcory, Ivory Coast, Diallo started his European career at Beveren, where he played with Ivorians, such as Emmanuel Eboué, Boubacar Barry and Yaya Touré.

In the summer of 2006, like many youth products, Diallo was sold to FC Sion, signing a three-year contract. He was loaned to Maccabi Petah Tikva and FC Chiasso. In July 2008, he left Sion and signed a contract with FC Champagne Sports and signed just one year later with Ajax Cape Town on 7 August 2009.
