= Kris De Wree =

Belgian footballer

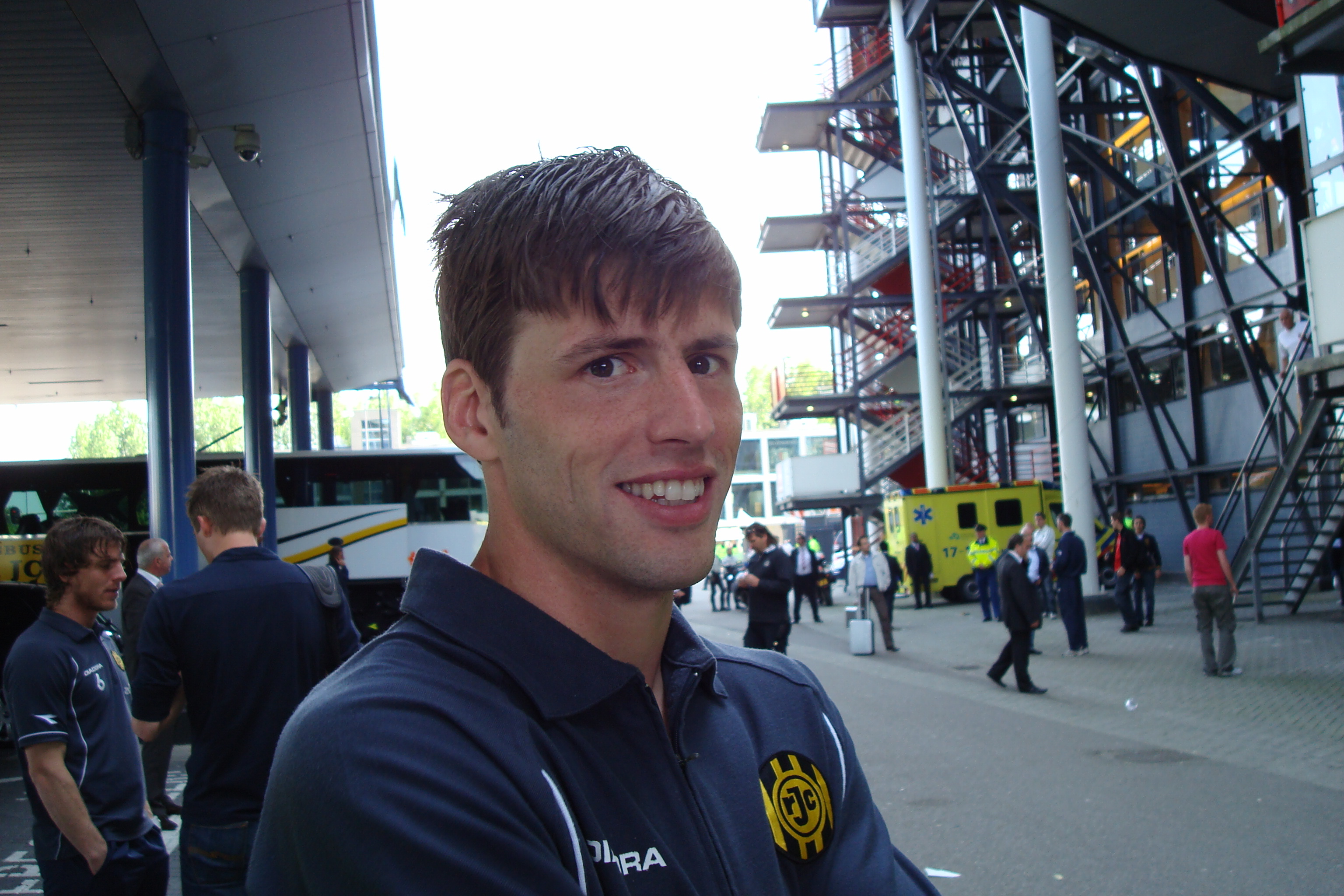

Personal information
- Full name: Kris De Wree
- Date of birth: 21 May 1981 (age 45)
- Place of birth: Sint-Gillis-Waas, Belgium
- Height: 1.83 m (6 ft 0 in)
- Positions: Right back; right winger

Senior career*
Years	Team	Apps	(Gls)
2000–2001	Beveren	20	(0)
2001–2009	Germinal Beerschot	132	(6)
2009–2010	Roda JC	14	(1)
2010–2013	Lierse	25	(1)
- * Club domestic league appearances and goals as of 7 May 2011

Kris De Wree (born 21 May 1981) is a Belgian football player who plays as a right midfielder or right winger. He has previously played for Lierse SK. He signed a contract at Roda JC from Kerkrade after leaving K.F.C. Germinal Beerschot, where he spent eight years of his career. In the 2005 Belgian Cup final, De Wree scored the winning goal for Germinal against Club Brugge KV.

== Honours ==
=== Club ===
Beerschot A.C.

- Belgian Cup: 2004–05
