= Dieter Van Tornhout =

Belgian footballer

Personal information
- Date of birth: 18 March 1985 (age 41)
- Place of birth: Ghent, Belgium
- Height: 6 ft 3 in (1.91 m)
- Position: Forward

Team information
- Current team: SK Berlare (player); KV Mechelen (staff)

Senior career*
Years	Team	Apps	(Gls)
2003–2006	Club Brugge	14	(3)
2005–2006	→ Sparta Rotterdam (loan)	13	(1)
2006–2009	Roda JC	52	(4)
2009–2011	Enosis Neon Paralimni	50	(18)
2011–2012	Nea Salamis Famagusta	15	(2)
2012	Kilmarnock	11	(1)
2012–2014	Antwerp	25	(8)
2013–2014	→ Roeselare (loan)	28	(8)
2014–2015	Gent-Zeehaven	14	(4)
2015–2016	Oudenaarde		
2019–	Berlare		

International career
2001	Belgium U16	5	(1)
2002	Belgium U17	3	(1)
2003–2004	Belgium U19	3	(1)
2005–2006	Belgium U21	5	(1)

Managerial career
- 2017–2018: Club Brugge (U21 assistant)
- * Club domestic league appearances and goals

Dieter Van Tornhout (born 18 March 1985) is a Belgian footballer who plays as a forward for SK Berlare. He is also a part of the technical staff of KV Mechelen.

He has previously played for Club Brugge, Sparta Rotterdam, Roda JC, Enosis Neon Paralimni, Nea Salamis Famagusta and Kilmarnock. He scored the winning goal for Kilmarnock in the 2012 Scottish League Cup Final.

== Club career ==
=== Club Brugge ===
Van Tornhout began his career with Club Brugge and made his first team debut in the 2003–04 season. While playing with Brugge he made three appearances in the UEFA Cup and one in the Champions League. His European debut came in a 1–0 win over Utrecht on 25 November 2004 during the UEFA Cup group stages the following season [in 2004–05] after having appeared twice on the bench in the UEFA Cup. During the season [in 2004–05], Van Tornhout would score three goals.

=== Sparta Rotterdam ===
Unable to establish a regular place in the Brugge side, he spent a season on loan with Dutch Eredivisie club Sparta Rotterdam. He scored on his debut, on 18 January 2006, in a 3–1 loss against N.E.C. A few weeks later, he then received a red card after a second bookable offence, in a 1–0 loss against AZ. At the end of the season, Van Tornhout made thirteen appearances and score once at his Sparta's career. The club also decided not to take an option to sign Van Tornhout.

=== Roda JC ===
At the start of 2006–07 season, Van Tornhout joined Rotterdam's league rivals Roda JC in 2006. He made his debut for the club, on the opening game of the season, in a 1–0 win over Excelsior. Two months later, on 21 October 2006 since he made his debut, he scored his first goal for Roda JC, against his former club, Sparta, while playing for them on loan, in a 2–1 win and was a winning goal. Another two months later, on 24 December 2006, since scoring his first goal, he scored another, in a 2–0 win over Twente.

The following season in 2007–08, Van Tornhout start his season by scoring his first goal of the season, in a 5–3 win over VVV-Venlo. In February 2008, Van Tornhout made impressive performance in two games. One is when he provided assist for Anouar Hadouir, which turns out to be a winning goal against Ajax on 10 February 2008. Two is when he scored against Twente the following week as Roda JC won 3–1. He also played in the final of KNVB Cup, which Roda JC lose 2–0 against Feyenoord. However towards the end of season, Van Tornhout soon suffered a serious knee injury that will ruled him out for the rest of the season and expected to be back from six to nine months. It took ten months for Van Tornhout to return to training from injury. He made his return from injury, in a 1–0 loss against NAC Breda, coming on as a substitute for Jeanvion Yulu-Matondo, in a late minute on 14 February 2009. However, since his return, Van Tornhout was unable to win his first team status at the club.

=== Enosis Neon Paralimni ===
In 2009, he moved to Cyprus to play for Enosis Neon Paralimni of the Cypriot First Division after making three appearances for Roda. On 12 September 2009, he scored on his debut in a 2–1 win over APOP Kinyras and scored again, the following week on 20 September 2009, in a 1–1 draw against APOEL. Later in the season, Van Tornhout have since scored seven goals. But soon, the league was split into four groups which the club was in Group B. In the Group B, Van Tornhout scored five goals, including a brace against APOP Kinyras, which the club finished sixth place and was also finished as the club top scorer. The next season, Van Tornhout scored a brace, on the opening game of the season, in a 2–0 win over APOP Kinyras. At the start of the season, he made an impressive performance by scoring three goals in three match. However, later on the season, Van Tornhout was unable to produce his performance, like last season and began goal drought that stretched 16 games.

=== Nea Salamis Famagusta ===
In 2011, he was transferred to Nea Salamis Famagusta. He made his debut for the club, on the opening game of the season, in a 3–0 loss against AEL Limassol. After a slow start in the first five games, Van Tornhout scored and scored again the following week in two consecutive games.

=== Kilmarnock ===
In January 2012, Van Tornhout joined Scottish Premier League club Kilmarnock on an 18-month contract. He scored the winning goal in the 2012 Scottish League Cup Final as Kilmarnock defeated Celtic 1–0 on 18 March, his 27th birthday, which he described as "an incredible feeling". After the match, Van Tornhout said his goal against was the best moment of his career. A few weeks after the Scottish League Final, Van Tornhout also scored his first league goal for the club, on 31 March 2012, in a 4–2 loss against St Mirren. After the match, he revealed that when he lift up his jersey – it says 'Belg' on his vest and also revealed that the kitman played the role of having his jersey 'Belg'.

In July 2012, it was confirmed by Kilmarnock manager Kenny Shiels that Van Tornhout had been allowed to leave the club to return to Belgium to be with his family as his father was terminally ill.

=== Antwerp ===
Two weeks after his release, Van Tornhout signed with Antwerp.

=== K.S.V. Roeselare (loan) ===
Despite a solid first season with Antwerp, Van Tornhout was deemed surplus to requirements, and joined fellow Second Division side K.S.V. Roeselare on a season long loan on 7 August 2013.

== Later career ==
Van Tornhout left Oudenaarde at the end of 2016 to put his active career on hold for a while to take his first steps into the coaching world. In August 2017, he returned to his former club, Club Brugge, as a talent manager and assistant manager of the Beloften-squad. In June 2018, he was then hired by KV Mechelen to the technical staff. He was hired as a video analyst, forward coach for the youth teams and individual coach for the first team.

On 25 July 2019, he joined SK Berlare as a player, alongside his role at KV Mechelen.

== International career ==
Van Tornhout was capped for Belgium at various youth levels from Under 16s to Under 21s, scoring four goals and earning 16 caps. His international debut came in a 0–0 draw against Macedonia during the qualifying round of the Under 16s European Championship on 5 March 2001. His last international appearance was against in a 2–1 win over Greece Under 21s on 6 September 2006.

== Honours ==
Club Brugge

- Belgian First Division winner: 2004–05
- Belgian Super Cup: 2004, 2005

Kilmarnock

- Scottish League Cup winner: 2011–12
