= David Rozehnal =

Czech footballer (born 1980)

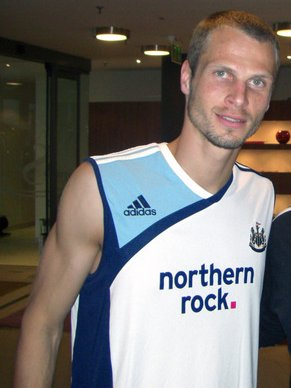
- Rozehnal with Newcastle United in 2007

Personal information
- Full name: David Rozehnal
- Date of birth: 5 July 1980 (age 46)
- Place of birth: Šternberk, Czechoslovakia
- Height: 1.91 m (6 ft 3 in)
- Position: Centre-back

Youth career
- 1988–1989: Sokol Kožušany
- 1989–1997: Sigma Olomouc
- 1997–1998: Sokol Kožušany
- 1998–1999: Sigma Olomouc B

Senior career*
Years	Team	Apps	(Gls)
1999–2003	Sigma Olomouc	72	(2)
2003–2005	Club Brugge	50	(1)
2005–2007	Paris Saint-Germain	75	(1)
2007–2008	Newcastle United	21	(0)
2008	→ Lazio (loan)	10	(0)
2008–2009	Lazio	28	(0)
2009–2011	Hamburger SV	23	(1)
2010–2011	→ Lille (loan)	13	(1)
2011–2015	Lille	62	(1)
2015–2018	K.V. Oostende	50	(1)
2018–2020	Sokol Kožušany		(0)
Total		405	(8)

International career
2001–2002	Czech Republic U21	8	(1)
2004–2009	Czech Republic	60	(1)
Medal record
Men's football
Representing Czech Republic
UEFA European Championship
Bronze medal – third place	2004
UEFA European Under-21 Championship
Winner	2002
- * Club domestic league appearances and goals

David Rozehnal (born 5 July 1980) is a Czech former professional footballer who played as a centre-back. He played for a host of European clubs, making over 400 appearances in a career spanning almost two decades, and retired from the professional game in April 2018. Internationally, Rozehnal made 60 appearances for the Czech Republic, appearing in three major tournaments: Euro 2004, the 2006 FIFA World Cup and Euro 2008.

== Early life ==
Rozehnal was born in Šternberk and raised in Kožušany. He comes from a sports family, his father was a second-league football player, his mother played competitive handball. His father then trained amateur club Sokol Kožušany, where Rozehnal started with football.

== Club career ==
=== Sigma Olomouc ===
Rozehnal joined the senior team at Sigma Olomouc in 1999 from the Sigma Olomouc B youth team. He finished as a runner-up in the 2000 UEFA Intertoto Cup, and he was also part of the Sigma Olomouc team which finished in third place in 2000–01.

=== Club Brugge ===
In 2003, Rozehnal joined Belgian club Club Brugge. Shortly after joining the club he was part of the side which defeated AC Milan at the San Siro in the UEFA Champions League. He won the Belgian Cup in his first season with Brugge and the Belgian League in the 2004–05 season.

=== Paris Saint-Germain ===
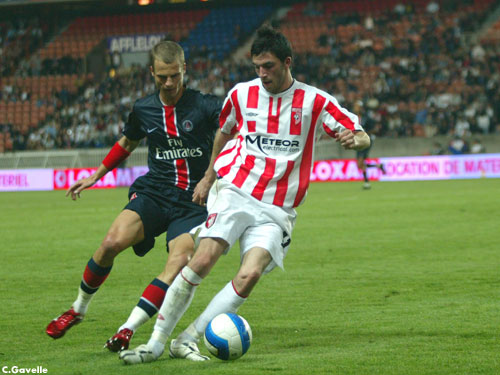
Rozehnal with Paris Saint-Germain in 2006

Rozehnal signed for Paris Saint-Germain in June 2005. His form resulted in reported interest from Borussia Dortmund, Newcastle United and Sevilla. Sources close to the defender confirmed that he would prefer a move to Newcastle.

=== Newcastle United ===
On 22 June 2007, Rozehnal's agent confirmed that a "definite agreement" had been reached for the player to join Newcastle United. Rozehnal underwent a medical check on 25 June and Newcastle confirmed the transfer had been completed on 29 June for a fee of £2.9 million, with the player signing a four-year contract. He made his league debut against Bolton Wanderers the same year on 11 August.

=== Lazio ===
On 31 January 2008, Rozehnal left Newcastle for Lazio on loan until the end of the 2007–08 Serie A despite having only signed in June 2007. After only playing seven times for Lazio during his loan spell, it remained unclear if they wanted to sign him permanently. On 9 June 2008, Lazio officially announced they had signed Rozehnal on a permanent basis, with Newcastle recouping the full £2.9 million which they initially paid for the defender.

=== Later career and retirement ===
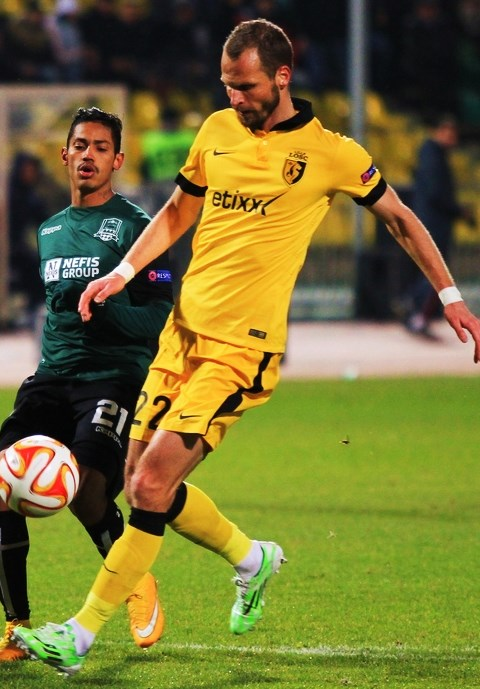
Rozehnal with Lille in 2014

After only one year in Italy, Rozehnal left Lazio on 29 July 2009 for German club Hamburger SV, signing a contract until 30 June 2012. Due to a poor season with several costly errors by Rozehnal, he was removed from the first team and asked to find a new club.

On 31 August 2010, Hamburg confirmed that Rozehnal had left for French side Lille on loan, with the German club still paying part of his salary. He made a permanent move to Lille in June 2011, signing a contract until 2014.

Rozehnal retired from professional football on 4 April 2018 and joined Sokol Kožušany alongside his brother, Marek. He made his debut for the club the following weekend.

== International career ==
Rozehnal was part of the Czech Republic national youth football team which won the UEFA U-21 Championships in 2002. In 2004, Rozehnal made his debut for the Czech Republic in a 2–2 friendly draw against Italy on 18 February 2004. He went on to play for his country at Euro 2004, where the team made it to the semi-finals before being knocked out by Greece. He also played in the group stage at the 2006 FIFA World Cup, although his nation did not advance to the knockout stages. Rozehnal played in his third major tournament at Euro 2008. He scored his only international goal in his 57th appearance for his country, finding the net in a 3–1 friendly win against Belgium.

== Personal life ==
Rozehnal is married to Petra with two children. Their first child, Luka, was born on 3 October 2007.

== Career statistics ==
=== International ===
Appearances and goals by national team and year
National team	Year	Apps	Goals
Czech Republic	2004	9	0
Czech Republic	2005	9	0
Czech Republic	2006	13	0
Czech Republic	2007	10	0
Czech Republic	2008	11	0
Czech Republic	2009	7	1
Total		60	1

Czech Republic score listed first, score column indicates score after each Rozehnal goal

List of international goals scored by David Rozehnal
No.	Date	Venue	Cap	Opponent	Score	Result	Competition	Ref.
1	12 August 2009	Na Stínadlech, Teplice, Czech Republic	57	Belgium	3–1	3–1	Friendly	

== Honours ==
Club Brugge

- Belgian Pro League: 2004–05
- Belgian Cup: 2003–04
- Belgian Super Cup: 2003, 2004

Paris Saint-Germain

- Coupe de France: 2005–06

Lazio

- Coppa Italia: 2008–09

Lille

- Ligue 1: 2010–11
- Coupe de France: 2010–11

Czech Republic U21

- UEFA U-21 Championships: 2002
