= Wim De Decker =

Belgian footballer and manager

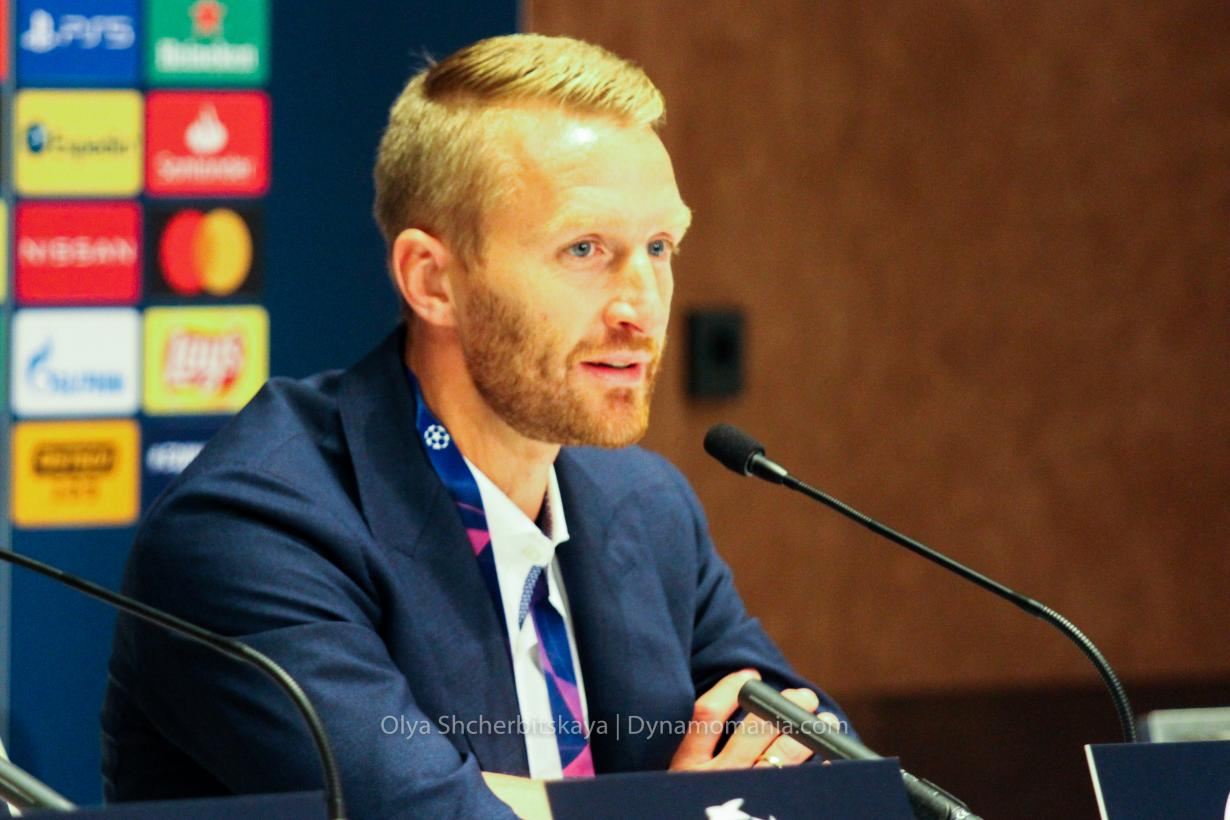
- De Decker with Gent

Personal information
- Date of birth: 6 April 1982 (age 44)
- Place of birth: Temse, Belgium
- Height: 1.84 m (6 ft 0 in)
- Position: Midfielder

Youth career
- –2000: RS Haasdonk

Senior career*
Years	Team	Apps	(Gls)
2000–2002	Beveren	29	(0)
2002–2003	Gent	25	(0)
2003–2004	→ Germinal Beerschot (loan)	17	(0)
2004–2006	Germinal Beerschot	63	(0)
2006–2009	Racing Genk	81	(1)
2009–2013	Germinal Beerschot	55	(1)
2013–2016	Antwerp	51	(0)

International career
2006	Belgium	2	(0)

Managerial career
- 2016: Antwerp (caretaker)
- 2016–2017: Antwerp
- 2017–2020: Antwerp (assistant)
- 2020: Gent (assistant)
- 2020: Gent
- 2021–2022: Deinze
- 2022–2024: Beveren
- * Club domestic league appearances and goals

Wim de Decker (born 6 April 1982) is a Belgian football manager and a former player.

== International career ==
He collected two caps with the Belgium national team.

== Honours ==
Beerschot A.C

- Belgian Cup: 2005
