= Seydou Badjan Kanté =

Ivorian footballer

Seydou Kanté
Personal information
- Full name: Seydou Badjan Kanté
- Date of birth: 7 August 1981 (age 45)
- Place of birth: Abidjan, Ivory Coast
- Height: 1.76 m (5 ft 9 in)
- Position: Defender

Youth career
- –1999: ASEC Mimosas

Senior career*
Years	Team	Apps	(Gls)
1999–2003	ASEC Mimosas		
2003–2007	Beveren	71	(2)
2007–2008	Istres	9	(0)
2013–2015	FC Alliance Äischdall		

International career^{‡}
2001–2006	Ivory Coast	6	(0)
- * Club domestic league appearances and goals as of 20 October 2006 ‡ National team caps and goals as of 20 October 2006

Seydou Badjan Kanté (born 7 August 1981) is a former Ivorian footballer who played as a defender.

== Club career ==
Kanté is a product of the famed youth academy at Ivorian-based club ASEC Mimosas. He joined Belgian side KSK Beveren in 2004, spending three years there. Then, he moved to French club FC Istres, which he left after one year.

== International career ==
He was called up to the Ivory Coast national team for the 2008 African Cup of Nations qualifier against Gabon on 5 October 2006.
