= Abdoulaye Djiré =

Ivorian footballer (born 1981)

Junior
Personal information
- Full name: Abdoulaye Djiré
- Date of birth: 28 February 1981 (age 45)
- Place of birth: Abidjan, Ivory Coast
- Height: 1.70 m (5 ft 7 in)
- Position: Midfielder

Youth career
- ASEC Mimosas

Senior career*
Years	Team	Apps	(Gls)
1999–2003	ASEC Mimosas		
2003–2006	Beveren	73	(1)
2006–2008	Metalurh Donetsk	18	(0)
2008	→ Germinal Beerschot (loan)	2	(0)
2008	Metalist Kharkiv	1	(0)
2012–2013	Paris FC	13	(0)
2013–2016	US Roye-Noyon	58	(0)

International career
2000–2005	Ivory Coast	44	(1)
- * Club domestic league appearances and goals

Abdoulaye Djiré (born 28 February 1981), also known as Junior, is an Ivorian former professional footballer who played as a midfielder.

== Career ==
Djiré was born in Abidjan, Ivory Coast. He spent two years with the Ukrainian club FC Metalurh Donetsk before joining Belgian side K.F.C. Germinal Beerschot on loan for the second half of the 2007–08 season. Germinal Beerschot also secured an option to sign him permanently.
