= Jonathan Blondel =

Belgian footballer (born 1984)

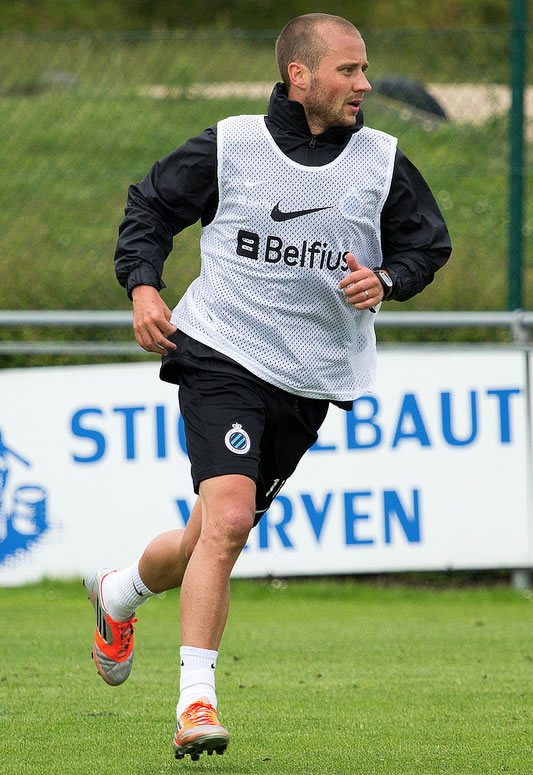

Personal information
- Full name: Jonathan Blondel
- Date of birth: 3 April 1984 (age 42)
- Place of birth: Ypres, Belgium
- Height: 1.73 m (5 ft 8 in)
- Position: Midfielder

Senior career*
Years	Team	Apps	(Gls)
2001–2002	Mouscron	18	(0)
2002–2004	Tottenham Hotspur	2	(0)
2004–2015	Club Brugge	189	(10)
Total		209	(10)

International career
1999–2001	Belgium U16	12	(0)
1999–2000	Belgium U17	3	(1)
2001–2003	Belgium U19	13	(3)
2003	Belgium U20	1	(0)
2002–2007	Belgium U21	20	(4)
2002–2010	Belgium	4	(0)
- * Club domestic league appearances and goals

Jonathan Blondel (born 3 April 1984) is a Belgian former footballer who last played as a midfielder.

== Career ==
=== Excelsior Mouscron ===
Blondel started his career at Excelsior Mouscron, making his league debut as a substitute on a 1–0 loss against RSC Charleroi on 7 September 2001, making a total of 18 league appearances in the season. Blondel also helped Mouscron to finish as runners-up at the 2001–02 Belgian Cup, scoring the equaliser in their subsequent defeat by Club Brugge and helping his team to qualify for the 2002–03 UEFA Cup

=== Tottenham Hotspur ===
Blondel was signed by Premier League club Tottenham Hotspur on 7 August 2002, having rejected a move to Manchester United earlier in the year. He made his Premier League debut on 31 August 2002 as a substitute in a 2–1 win against Southampton at the age of 18 years and 150 days. Lacking first-team football and being relegated to the reserve team, Blondel considered to ask a loan move to Belgium. Royal Excelsior Mouscron enquired about a loan return deal, which was not agreed.

Blondel made his second and last Premier League appearance in a 1–0 home loss against Bolton Wanderers on 1 November 2003, again as a substitute and almost netting a late equaliser.

=== Club Brugge ===
On 28 January 2004, Blondel returned to Belgium after agreeing to join Club Brugge. He played a total of 266 games for The Blues, before announcing his retirement from professional football on 13 January 2015 after years of injury trouble. His last official match was on 8 August 2013, in the 2013–14 UEFA Europa League.

During his career at Club Brugge, Blondel won the 2004–05 Belgian First Division, the 2003–04 and 2006–07 Belgian Cups and was part of the squad that won the 2014–15 Belgian Cup, although not playing in the latter and retiring before Club Brugge won the title.

== International career ==
Blondel has played for Belgium under-19 and under-21 teams before being capped for the Belgium national football team. His debut was on 21 August 2002, coming off the bench in a friendly match against Poland. He returned to the national side in 2004 for the friendly matches against Germany and Turkey After almost six years from his 3rd international appearance, Blondel received his 4th and last cap in 2010, in a friendly match against Croatia.

== Honours ==
=== Club ===
Club Brugge

- Belgian First Division A: 2004–05
- Belgian Cup: 2003–04, 2006–07
- Belgian Super Cup: 2004, 2005
