= 2003–04 Belgian Cup =

Tournament details
- Country: Belgium

Final positions
- Champions: Club Brugge
- Runners-up: Beveren

The 2003–04 Belgian Cup was the 49th season of the main knockout competition in Belgian association football, the Belgian Cup.

== Final rounds ==
The final phase started in the round of 32 when all clubs from the first division entered the competition. All rounds were played in one leg except for the quarter-finals and semi-finals. The final game was played at the King Baudouin Stadium in Brussels and won by Club Brugge against Beveren.

=== Bracket ===
Round of 32
Sporting West	1
Club Brugge	3
Gent	2
Maldegem	0
Charleroi	3
Geel	4*
Verviétois	0
Louviéroise	2*
Cercle Brugge	2
Standard Liège	0
STVV	1(4)
Bocholter	1(5)
Mons	2
Denderhoutem	3
Mouscron	4
Walhain	0
FC Brussels	1
Anderlecht	5
Antwerp	2*
Roeselare	1
Lokeren	2(4)
Cappellen	2(2)
Genk	0
Heusden-Zolder	2
Germinal Beerschot	4
Deinze	1
Lierse	5
Hedera Millen	0
Tubize	1
Westerlo	3
Hamme	1
Beveren	3

Round of 16
Club Brugge	2
Gent	0
Geel	0
Louviéroise	1
Cercle Brugge	3
Bocholter	0
Denderhoutem	0
Mouscron	4
Anderlecht	4
Antwerp	2
Lokeren	1
Heusden-Zolder	2
Germinal Beerschot	1(3)
Lierse	1(1)
Westerlo	1(4)
Beveren	1(5)

Quarter-finals
Club Brugge	1	2
Louviéroise	2	0
Cercle Brugge	2	0
Mouscron	3	0
Anderlecht	3	0
Heusden-Zolder	2	0
Germinal Beerschot	1	0
Beveren	2	1

Semifinals
Club Brugge	2	1
Mouscron	2	0
Anderlecht	1	0
Beveren	1	0

Final
Club Brugge	4
Beveren	2

- After extra time

=== Final ===
17 May 2004
16:00 CEST

Beveren	2–4	Club Brugge
Verlinden 38' (o.g.); Maertens 61' (o.g.)	Report; Youtube	Verheyen 34'; Čeh 46'; Mendoza 75'; Van Der Heyden 79'

King Baudouin Stadium, Brussels
Attendance: 40,000
Referee: Johny Ver Eecke
