= Karel Snoeckx =

Belgian footballer

Personal information
- Date of birth: 29 October 1973 (age 53)
- Place of birth: Turnhout
- Height: 1.81 m (5 ft 11 in)
- Position: Midfielder

Youth career
- 1981–1983: HIH Turnhout
- 1983–1984: FC Turnhout
- 1984–: Lierse S.K.

Senior career*
Years	Team	Apps	(Gls)
1991–1997	Lierse S.K.	131	(9)
1997–1999	Lokeren	62	(6)
1999–2003	Lierse S.K.	119	(6)
2003	→ Vålerenga (loan)	6	(0)
2004–2005	Germinal Beerschot	13	(0)
2006	Lierse S.K. (loan)	14	(0)
2006–2008	Beveren	25	(2)
2008–2009	Hoogstraten VV		
2009–2010	KFC Lille		
2010–2011	White Star Schorvoort		

International career
1996	Belgium	1	(0)
- * Club domestic league appearances and goals

Karel Snoeckx (born 29 October 1973) is a retired Belgian football player.

In 2026, Snoeckx was the victim of road rage, resulting in him being hospitalized with a severe head trauma. The aggressor was arrested.

== Honours ==
Lierse SK

- Belgian First Division: 1996–97
- Belgian Super Cup: 1999

Beerschot A.C

- Belgian Cup: 2004–05
