= 2001–02 Belgian Cup =

Tournament details
- Country: Belgium

Final positions
- Champions: Club Brugge
- Runners-up: Mouscron

Tournament statistics
- Matches played: 33
- Goals scored: 129 (3.91 per match)
- Top goal scorer: Josip Šimić (8 goals)

The 2001–02 Belgian Cup was the 47th season of the main knockout competition in Belgian association football, the Belgian Cup.

== Final rounds ==
The final phase started in the round of 32 when all clubs from the first division entered the competition (18 clubs plus 14 clubs from the qualifications). All rounds were played in one leg except for the semifinals (in two legs) and the quarter-finals (in one leg with replay). The final game was played at the Heysel Stadium in Brussels and won by Club Brugge against Mouscron.

=== Bracket ===
Round of 32
Antwerp	4
Maldegem	0
Club Brugge	12
Ourodenberg Aarschot	2
Turnhout	5
Wevelgem	1
Beveren	4
Visé	0
Lommelse	1
Louviéroise	3*
Mons	1
Tubize	3
Anderlecht	3
Lokeren	4
Zuid-West-Vlaanderen	0(5)
Oud-Heverlee	0(6)
Mouscron	7
Bocholter	1
Molenbeek	4
Hamme	0
Genk	3*
Standard Liège	2
Geel	0
Westerlo	4
Lierse	2
R Charleroi SC	0
Aalst	2
Ingelmunster	0
Germinal Beerschot	4
Gent	3
Sint-Truidense	2
Diegem	1

Round of 16
Antwerp	1(3)
Club Brugge	1(4)
Turnhout	2
Beveren	3
Louviéroise	2
Tubize	1
Lokeren	1
Oud-Heverlee	0
Mouscron	4
Molenbeek	1
Genk	2
Westerlo	1
Lierse	2
Aalst	0
Germinal Beerschot	0
Sint-Truidense	1

Quarter-finals
Club Brugge	1
Beveren	0
Louviéroise	0
Lokeren	2
Mouscron	5*
Genk	2
Lierse	0
Sint-Truidense	2

Semifinals
Club Brugge	3	3
Lokeren	0	0
Mouscron	3	2
Sint-Truidense	0	2

Final
Club Brugge	3
Mouscron	1

* after extra time

=== Final ===
9 May 2002
16:00 CEST

Club Brugge	3–1	Mouscron
Mendoza 22', 73', 89'	Report	Blondel 58'

King Baudouin Stadium, Brussels
Referee: Jacky Quaranta
