= Luciano da Silva (footballer) =

Brazilian footballer (born 1980)

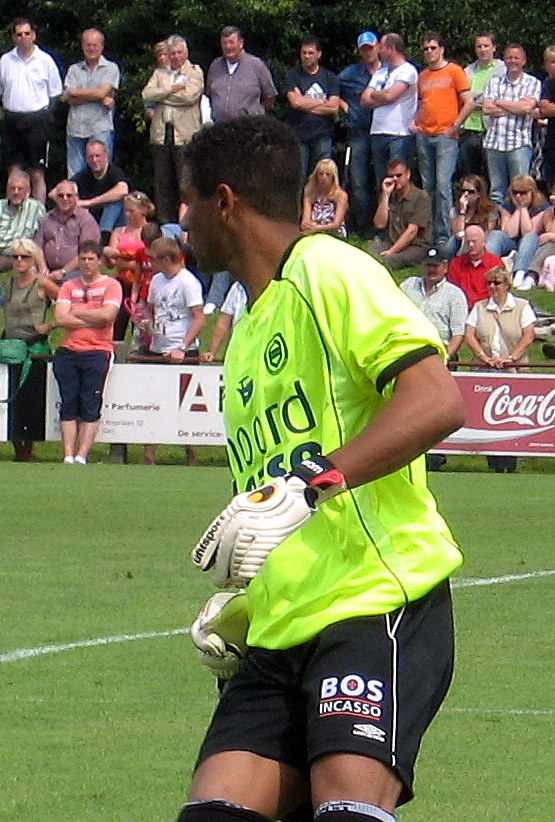
- Luciano with FC Groningen

Personal information
- Full name: Luciano José Pereira da Silva
- Date of birth: 16 March 1980 (age 46)
- Place of birth: Rio Branco, Brazil
- Height: 1.75 m (5 ft 9 in)
- Position: Goalkeeper

Youth career
- Vasco da Gama
- Tombense

Senior career*
Years	Team	Apps	(Gls)
2000–2007	Germinal Beerschot	179	(0)
2007–2014	FC Groningen	131	(0)
Total		310	(0)
- * Club domestic league appearances and goals

Luciano José Pereira da Silva (born 16 March 1980) is a Brazilian former professional footballer who played as a goalkeeper.

== Career ==
Luciano joined Belgian club K.F.C. Germinal Beerschot from Tombense in 2000. In December 2003 he saved three penalties against Lierse, helping his club progress to the quarter-finals of the Belgian Cup.

Upon Luciano's signing for Eredivisie club FC Groningen, the technical manager of the club, Henk Veldmate, described him as "a spectacular keeper who, because of that, has a lot of risk in his game play". In 2009 he received the Silver Shoe award for the second-best player of the Eredivisie season.

On 24 February 2010, Luciano extended his contract with FC Groningen until 2012. On 14 February 2014, he and Groningen agreed to dissolve his contract so he could return to Brazil for a knee surgery.

== Honours ==
Beerschot A.C.

- Belgian Cup: 2004–05

Individual

- Dutch Silver Shoe: 2009
