= Marc Brys =

Belgian football player and manager

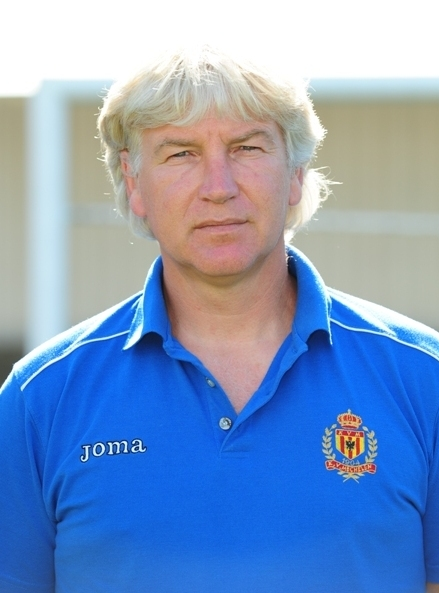
- Brys with KV Mechelen in 2010

Personal information
- Date of birth: 10 May 1962 (age 64)
- Place of birth: Antwerp, Belgium
- Position: Defender

Senior career*
Years	Team	Apps	(Gls)
1972–1978	Beerschot		
1978–1993	Wilrijk		
1993–1994	Merksem		
1994–1997	Wilrijk		
1997–1998	Willebroek		

Managerial career
- 1998–2001: Londerzeel
- 2001–2003: Berchem Sport
- 2003–2005: Germinal Beerschot
- 2006: Deinze
- 2006–2007: Germinal Beerschot
- 2007: Mouscron
- 2008–2009: FC Eindhoven
- 2009–2010: Den Bosch
- 2010–2012: KV Mechelen
- 2012–2013: Al-Faisaly
- 2014: Al-Raed
- 2014: Najran
- 2014–2015: Al-Raed
- 2016–2018: Beerschot Wilrijk
- 2018–2019: Sint-Truiden
- 2020–2023: OH Leuven
- 2024–2025: Cameroon
- * Club domestic league appearances and goals

Marc Brys (born 10 May 1962) is a Belgian football manager and former player.

== Career ==
His coaching career took off at Belgian club Berchem Sport, which he guided to the championship of the Belgian fourth and third divisions. After this success, Brys took over the first-division club Germinal Beerschot.

In his first year, with the smallest competition budget, Germinal finished seventh, although 75% of Belgian coaches predicted that the club would be relegated. In May 2005, during his second year, Brys led Germinal to a 2–1 victory over Club Brugge in the Belgian Cup, the first and only prize Germinal would win in its history. Germinal participated in the 2005–06 UEFA Cup, but were eliminated by Marseille on penalty kicks.

In 2006–07, Brys coached Royal Mouscron-Péruwelz, where he was fired despite finishing in seventh place. He subsequently coached in Holland at FC Eindhoven and Den Bosch.

In 2010, Brys signed for two years with KV Mechelen. In his first year, the club attained the highest point total in its history. In 2012, Brys managed Saudi club Al-Faisaly. He reached the semi-finals of the Crown Prince Cup and became group winner of the GCC Champions League. In his second season, however, he was fired and took over the Club Al-Raed for the last four games of the competition. He managed to keep them in the First League with two wins and two draws.

Following a stint of over three seasons, Brys was finally sacked at OH Leuven in October 2023 and retired, settling with his wife in his home in Crete.

Six months later however, Brys was appointed by Cameroon, following in the footsteps of fellow Belgian manager Hugo Broos, who had already lead the team in 2016 and 2017. Brys also stated he had turned down offers from other African nations, such as Ghana and Tunisia. On 1 December, Brys was sacked days before the 2025 Africa Cup of Nations, with the Cameroonian Football Federation accusing him of "subterfuge and unprofessionalism" due to Cameroon failing to qualify for the 2026 FIFA World Cup. However, he denied being dismissed, insisting that he was still the legitimate head coach after submitting his own AFCON squad list, which was later rejected by the federation.

== Managerial statistics ==
As of matches played 1 December 2025

Managerial record by team and tenure
Team	From	To	Record								Ref
Team	From	To	G	W	D	L	GF	GA	GD	Win %	Ref
Germ. Beerschot	July 2003	September 2005	87	29	22	36	88	107	−19	33.33	
Germ. Beerschot	July 2006	June 2007	35	14	9	12	52	47	+5	40.00	
R.E. Mouscron	July 2007	December 2007	17	6	4	7	23	23	+0	35.29	
FC Eindhoven	July 2008	June 2009	40	10	14	16	64	83	−19	25.00	
Den Bosch	July 2009	June 2010	40	16	12	12	73	59	+14	40.00	
KV Mechelen	July 2010	June 2012	78	29	19	30	103	112	−9	37.18	
Najran	August 2014	October 2014	3	0	0	3	2	4	−2	0.00	
Beerschot Wilrijk	July 2016	May 2018	81	46	18	17	146	83	+63	56.79	
Sint-Truiden	July 2018	November 2019	60	24	20	16	89	82	+7	40.00	
OH Leuven	June 2020	October 2023	119	40	32	47	183	201	−18	33.61	
Cameroon	June 2024	December 2025	19	11	6	2	27	10	+17	57.89	
Career totals			580	224	157	199	850	811	+39	38.62	

== Honours ==
Berchem Sport

- Belgian Third Division: 2001–02

Germinal Beerschot

- Belgian Cup: 2004–05

Individual

- Raymond Goethals Award: 2020
