= KSK Tongeren =

Belgian football club

Tongeren
- Full name: Koninklijke Sportkring Tongeren
- Nickname: De Eburonen (The Eburones)
- Founded: 1908; 118 years ago (Note: The club's foundation date is given inconsistently in the sources. Cercle Sportif Tongrois is generally dated to 1908, while other accounts place the continuous club's origin in 1917. When the Royal Belgian Football Association introduced registration numbers in 1926, the club was assigned matricule 73; it took over the vacant matricule 54—previously held by a club from Welkenraedt until that club's 1932 merger—in 1947. The name Koninklijke Sportkring Tongeren itself dates only from the 1969 merger with Patria FC Tongeren, after which the combined club continued under matricule 54 while Patria's matricule 71 was struck off.)
- Ground: SportOase Eburons Dome
- Capacity: 5,000
- Chairman: Hubert Jackers
- Head coach: Silvio Giovanelli
- League: Belgian Division 2
- 2025–26: Belgian Division 2 VV B, 12th of 16
- Website: ksktongeren.be
Home colours

Koninklijke Sportkring Tongeren is a Belgian football club based in Tongeren, in the province of Limburg. The club plays in the Belgian Division 2 and holds matricule 54.

The club traces its origins to Cercle Sportif Tongrois, founded in 1908, and took its present name in 1969 following a merger with K Patria FC Tongeren. It was an established second-division side through the 1970s and reached the top flight for the first time in 1981, spending two seasons in the Belgian First Division before relegation in 1983. The club dropped out of the second division in 1996 and has since competed in the lower divisions of Belgian football.

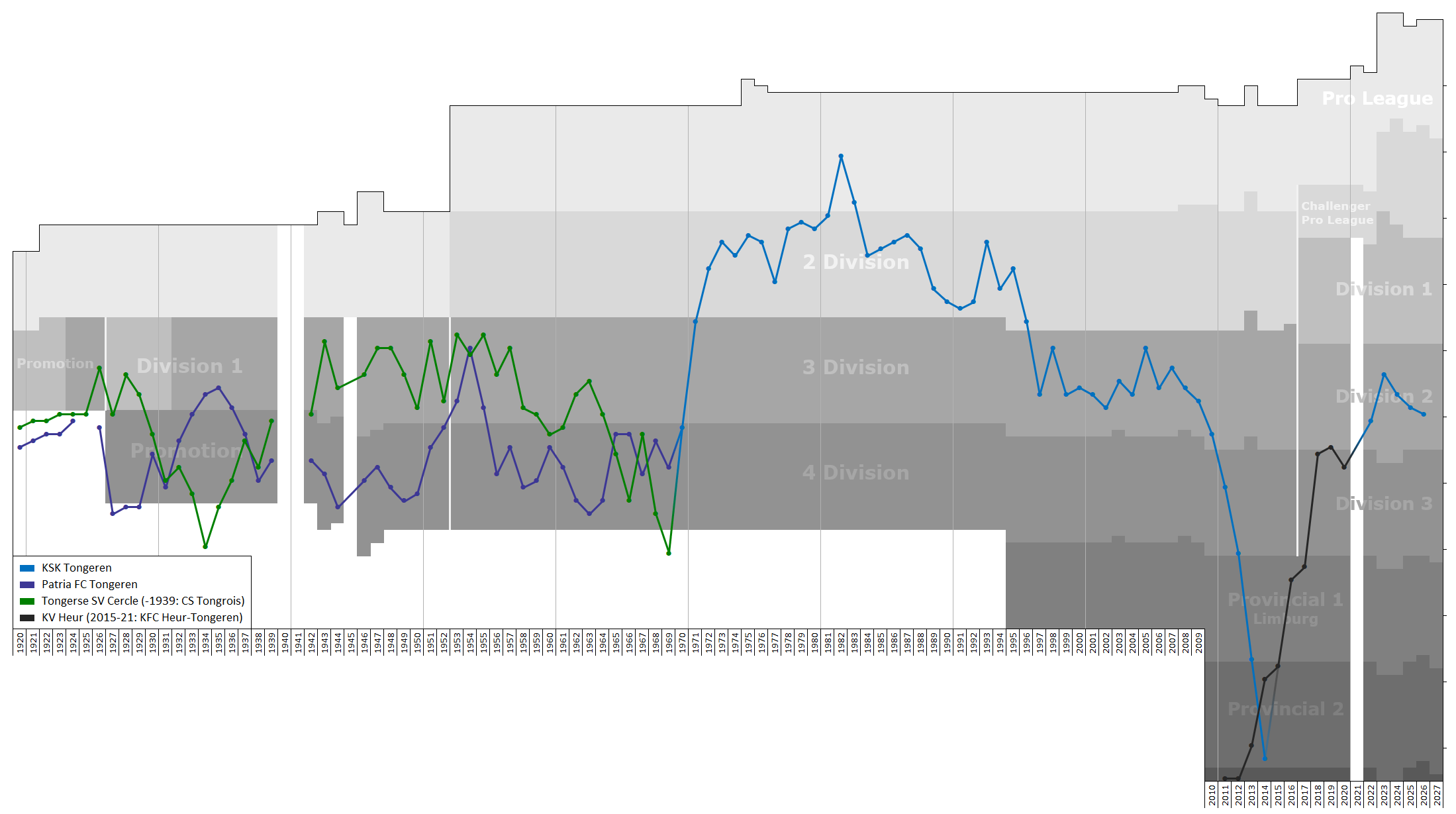
Historical chart of KSK Tongeren league performance

== History ==
=== Origins ===
Former logo

Football in Tongeren dates to the formation of Cercle Sportif Tongrois, founded in 1908. The club's administrative identity is unusual even by Belgian standards: it did not originally hold matricule 54, the registration number it now carries. That number had belonged to a club from Welkenraedt, and became available after a 1932 merger under the federation's pre-1964 rules requiring merged clubs to take a new matricule; in 1947 it was reassigned to the Tongeren club, which thereby became, on paper, the city's oldest club.

=== 1969 merger and rise to the top flight (1969–1983) ===
For decades the club shared the city with a rival, Patria FC Tongeren, the two competing in the lower national and provincial divisions. The rivalry ended in 1969, when the two merged to form Koninklijke Sportkring Tongeren. The merged club continued under Tongeren's matricule 54, while Patria's matricule 71 was struck off.

The merged club rose quickly, winning successive promotions to reach the Second Division by 1971. It became an established second-tier side, reaching the final of the Belgian Cup in 1974, where it lost 4–1 to KSV Waregem. The team was managed by the Dutchman Frans Körver, in the first appointment of a career in which he won a record six promotions to the Eredivisie.

The club's most successful period was built around the defender Lei Clijsters, who joined in 1977 and, according to the Belgian Pro League, developed Tongeren into the "best-footballing team" in the division. After several unsuccessful promotion play-offs in the late 1970s, the club won the Second Division title in 1981 and reached the First Division for the first time in its history. Playing at the De Motten stadium—where it hosted clubs such as Anderlecht, Standard Liège and Club Brugge—Tongeren finished a creditable ninth in its debut top-flight season of 1981–82, level on points with Waterschei, though only three points clear of the relegation places. Clijsters left for Waterschei in 1982, and the following season Tongeren finished second from bottom and were relegated after two seasons in the top flight.

=== Decline and merger with Heur (1983–2021) ===
Tongeren remained in the upper reaches of the Second Division for much of the 1980s, reaching another promotion play-off in 1987, before gradually slipping down the table and being relegated to the Third Division in 1996. The club spent the following years in the third tier, mostly in mid-table. After the 2004–05 season it was obliged to leave De Motten—where an athletics track was being installed—and in 2006 moved to a new ground, De Keiberg, in the same year merging with FC Hedera Millen. Clijsters returned as manager in 2007 but had to give up the role after being diagnosed with skin cancer; he died in January 2009.

The club's decline accelerated thereafter. It was relegated to the fourth tier in 2010 and, after further relegations, dropped out of the national divisions entirely in 2012, falling to the provincial leagues for the first time in three-quarters of a century. Continued struggles left the club in the Second Provincial division by 2014.

=== Revival as KFC Heur-Tongeren (2014–2021) ===
During the 2013–14 season it entered merger talks with a neighbouring Tongeren club, KV Heur VV (matricule 4600); from 2014–15 the first team continued under Heur's matricule 4600 as KFC Heur-Tongeren, while matricule 54 was retained for the youth section.

Under the merged identity, the club climbed rapidly. It won the Second Provincial title in 2015 and was promoted from First Provincial to the Third Amateur Division in 2016, returning to the national leagues for the first time since 2012. In the 2017–18 season it won the Third Amateur Division B title, securing the championship on the final day with a 4–2 win over Bilzerse Waltwilder. Promotion to the Second Amateur Division followed, though the club was relegated after a single season. It returned at the second attempt in 2019–20, a campaign curtailed by the COVID-19 pandemic with the club in a joint-second position; that season it also reached the last 32 of the Belgian Cup, losing to the professional side KAA Gent.

In April 2021 the merger between Heur-Tongeren and the historic Tongeren club was formally completed. The youth section, which had retained matricule 54 throughout, absorbed the first team and reserves (until then registered under matricule 4600); the unified club reverted to the name KSK Tongeren, playing under matricule 54 with blue-and-white colours.

=== Recent years (2021–present) ===
Since reverting to the name KSK Tongeren in 2021, the club has competed in the Second National Division, the fourth tier of Belgian football. Alexandre Di Gregorio, a former Genk player, was appointed head coach in February 2024, assisted by Jordan Remacle.

The club's youth academy holds the Belgian federation's four-star quality label. In September 2024 the city of Tongeren announced a €3–4 million redevelopment of the Kleinveldje site, where the club's youth teams play, comprising a new building with twelve dressing rooms and a fitness room and an additional artificial pitch with a stand; work was expected to begin in the second half of 2025.

== Stadium ==
For most of its history the club played at the Stadion De Motten in Tongeren. The ground had originally been built for Patria FC Tongeren, who moved there in 1966, and passed to the merged club after 1969. During Tongeren's two seasons in the First Division between 1981 and 1983 it hosted visiting clubs including Anderlecht, Standard Liège and Club Brugge. The stadium was known for an unusual two-tiered standing terrace, the Elascon stand, built in the 1970s and demolished in 2004.

The club was required to leave De Motten after the 2004–05 season, when an athletics track was laid at the ground; it briefly used the facilities of Genk before its new stadium, De Keiberg, opened in 2006. De Motten subsequently passed to the local athletics club, which continued to use it. The club's first team later played at the Eburons Dome (Sportoase), while its youth section was based at Klein Veldje.

== Notable players ==
The following players represented their countries at full international level while playing for, or after playing for, the club:

- Lei Clijsters – a 40-cap Belgium international who spent five seasons at Tongeren from 1977, helping the club to promotion to the First Division in 1981 before joining Waterschei; he later returned as manager in 2007 and died in 2009.
- Jos Daerden – a midfielder who came through the club's youth ranks and made his first-team debut in 1972, spending nine seasons at Tongeren before a 1980 transfer to Standard Liège and going on to win five caps for Belgium.
- Johnny Crossan – a Northern Ireland international and former Sunderland, Manchester City and Middlesbrough forward who ended his playing career at Tongeren.

== Honours ==
Honour	Years
Second Division	1980–81
Third Division	1941–42, 1970–71
Fourth Division (Bevordering)	1960–61, 1969–70
Third Amateur Division B	2017–18
Second Provincial Limburg	1913–14, 1922–23, 1923–24, 1924–25, 2014–15
Belgian Cup; Runners-up	1973–74
