= Beerschot AC =

Belgian football club

- Full name: Koninklijke Beerschot Antwerpen Club
- Nicknames: De Mannekes, De Ratten
- Founded: 1920; 106 years ago (Germinal Ekeren); 1999; 27 years ago (rebranding; as Germinal Beerschot)
- Dissolved: 2013; 13 years ago
- Ground: Olympisch Stadion, Antwerp
- Capacity: 12,771
- Website: www.beerschot.be
Home colours	Away colours

Koninklijke Beerschot Antwerpen Club (Dutch pronunciation: [ˈkoːnɪŋkləkə ˈbeːrsxɔt ˈɑntʋɛrpə(ŋ) ˈklʏp]), simply known as Beerschot AC, was a Belgian football club based in southern Antwerp. Beerschot played in the Belgian Pro League from 1999–2000 (as Germinal Beerschot) until 2012–13, when they were relegated not only through their league position, but also lost their professional licence through financial issues, being officially declared bankrupt on 21 May 2013, one week after the season had ended.

K.F.C. Germinal Ekeren, established in 1920, rebranded themselves as Germinal Beerschot in 1999, retaining the matricule number and history but adopting some of the identity of K Beerschot VAC, seven-times Belgian champions but struggling with financial problems in the third division. Germinal Ekeren had been a first division club for the past decade, and were Belgian Cup winners in 1997.

Following the merger in 1999, the club moved from the Veltwijckstadion in the municipality of Ekeren to the Olympisch Stadion in the Kiel neighbourhood in Antwerp. Their outfits mixed the yellow and red of Germinal Ekeren with the purple of Beerschot. Their biggest rival was Royal Antwerp F.C. They won the Belgian Cup in 2005.

On 17 May 2011, the club changed its name again to Koninklijke Beerschot Antwerpse Club or Beerschot AC. The name change was the result of an internal struggle which split the board of directors which ended with the former Germinal Ekeren board members vacating their position, giving a free path to remove the mention of Germinal in the team's name by the new directors as part of a business plan to restore the former K. Beerschot V.A.C. to its former glory. In addition, the club set its motto to the Latin phrase 'Tene Quod Bene', which translates as 'keep what is good', again referring to the fact that only the "Beerschot" part was kept. After being relegated in 2012–13, the club went bankrupt at the end of the season, was removed from competition altogether and folded shortly afterwards. In June 2013, K.F.C.O. Wilrijk unofficially integrated Beerschot AC's identity into theirs to become FCO Beerschot Wilrijk, moving to Beerschot AC's vacated stadium. This new club started in the first division of the Belgian Provincial leagues.

The youth academy of Beerschot produced the likes of Thomas Vermaelen, Mousa Dembélé, Radja Nainggolan, Jan Vertonghen, and Toby Alderweireld.

== History ==
In 1920 F.C. Germinal Ekeren was founded in the town of Ekeren, a northern suburb of Antwerp. Several years earlier, in 1899, Beerschot was founded at Het Kiel, a southern outskirt of Antwerp, where the 1920 Olympics had been held. In 1971 Germinal Ekeren added the prefix Koninklijk to their name (meaning Royal in Dutch). The team reached the top division in Belgian football in 1989 and finished 13th. They achieved their highest league position of third in 1996 and 1998 and subsequently qualified for the UEFA Cup. However, in 1999, due to the low attendance of supporters and limited expansion possibilities in Ekeren, the club merged with Beerschot who were then playing in the 3rd division and themselves had severe financial problems.

With the change, a new logo was also introduced, replacing the former logo of Germinal Beerschot

The new team, K.F.C. Germinal Beerschot Antwerpen kept the matricule n°3530 of Ekeren to keep their place in the first division, but retained the stadium of Beerschot, rebuilding it in the process. By keeping the matricule of Ekeren, the honours of Beerschot were considered to be distinct and separate from the new team and the club finally dropped the name Antwerpen in 2003. In 2004 further financial difficulties were experienced and Marc Brys was brought in as coach. He led the team to victory in the Belgian Cup that year, and in doing so secured a place in UEFA Cup for his side. After only 7 matches in the Jupiler League 2005-06 season, he was fired due to bad results (4 points from 21 and a 3–0 defeat against the 18th placed team).

May 2013, Naamloze vennootschap Beerschot announced it would be liquidated. After having failed to present a financial plan to the Royal Belgian Football Association, the club had lost its license to play in the 1st division. Unable to attract enough financial means to continue playing in a lower division they decided upon liquidation. Initially it was unclear what would happen to the matricule or players, but it became clear on 21 May 2013 that the club dissolved, meaning the matricule was lost and the players free to look for a new club.

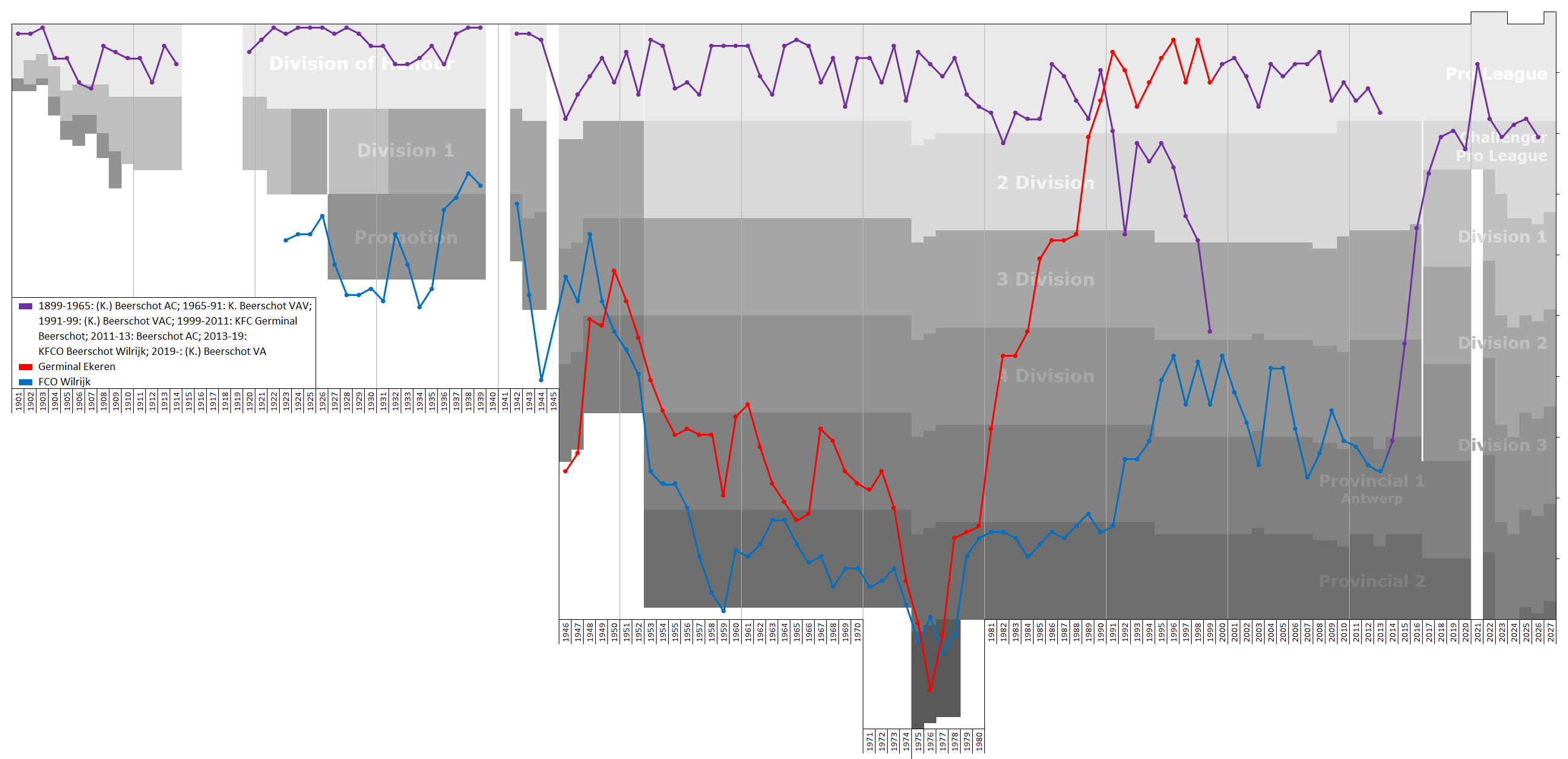
Historical league performance chart of Germinal Ekeren and Beerschot

Late May 2013 the "entourage" and fans of Beerschot started negotiations with K.F.C.O. Wilrijk and Sportkring Sint-Niklaas in the hope of a "merge" of Beerschot with one of them. In June 2013 when K.F.C.O. Wilrijk adapted its name into F.C.O. Beerschot-Wilrijk, this "merge" took place. The new club started in the first division of the Belgian Provincial leagues.

=== European competitions ===
The matricule number 3530 played their first European game as KFC Germinal Ekeren in the 1991–92 season against Celtic of Scotland (losing 2–0 away and drawing 1–1 at home). They qualified for the UEFA Cup in that year following a 5th-place finish in the championship. They then had to wait until 1995 and a 6th-place finish to qualify for their next European competition (Intertoto Cup), finishing 2nd in Group 3 of the first round behind FC Aarau of Switzerland, which was insufficient to qualify for the second round. In 1996–97 they qualified for the UEFA Cup after finishing 3rd in the league. The club was defeated by Grazer AK in the first round.

In 1997–98 they played the UEFA Cup Winners' Cup after a Belgian Cup win. They lost in the second round at the hands of VfB Stuttgart after a win against FK Crvena Zvezda. The next season, they reached the UEFA Cup first preliminary round after a 3rd place, but lost in the second preliminary round against Swiss team Servette FC. In the 2008 UEFA Intertoto Cup (their only entry as Germinal Beerschot), they met Neftchi Baku of Azerbaijan in the second round, drawing 1–1 at home but losing 0–1 away to be eliminated from the competition.

== Honours ==
- Belgian Second Division
  - Winners: 1988–89
- Belgian Cup
  - Winners: 1996–97, 2004–05
  - Runners-up: 1989–90, 1994–95
- Belgian Super Cup
  - Runners-up: 1997, 2005

== European record ==
As of December 2008.

Competition	Appearances	Matches played	Won	Drawn	Lost	GF	GA
Cup Winners' Cup	1	4	2	1	1	8	9
UEFA Cup	4	10	3	4	3	11	12
Intertoto Cup	2	6	2	3	1	11	7

Season	Competition	Round		Club	Home	Away
1991–92	UEFA Cup	1R	(Scotland)	Celtic F.C.	1–1	0–2
1995	UEFA Intertoto Cup	Group 3	(Switzerland)	FC Aarau	3–3	
			(Faroe Islands)	HB Torshavn		1–1
			(Romania)	Universitatea Cluj	4–1	
			(Norway)	Tromsø IL		2–0
1996–97	UEFA Cup	1R	(Austria)	Grazer AK	3–1	0–2
1997–98	UEFA Cup Winners' Cup	1R	(Federal Republic of Yugoslavia)	Crvena Zvezda	3–2	1–1
		2R	(Germany)	VfB Stuttgart	0–4	4–2
1998–99	UEFA Cup	1QR	(Bosnia and Herzegovina)	FK Sarajevo	4–1	0–0
		2QR	(Switzerland)	Servette Genève	1–4	2–1
2005–06	UEFA Cup	1R	(France)	Olympique Marseille	0–0	0–0 (1–4 pen.)
2008	UEFA Intertoto Cup	2R	(Azerbaijan)	Neftçi Baku	1–1	0–1

== Notable former players ==
- (Belgium) Toby Alderweireld (youth)
- (Belgium) Mousa Dembélé
- (Belgium) Tom De Mul (youth)
- (Belgium) Radja Nainggolan (youth)
- (Belgium) Jelle Van Damme
- (Belgium) Thomas Vermaelen (youth)
- (Belgium) Jan Vertonghen (youth)
- (Belgium) Wesley Sonck
- (Kenya) Victor Wanyama
- (Canada) Tomasz Radzinski

== Former coaches ==
- (Belgium) Franky Van der Elst (1999 – July 2003)
- (Belgium) Marc Brys (July 2003 – September 2005)
- (Belgium) Jos Daerden (September 2005 – June 2006)
- (Belgium) Marc Brys (July 2006 – June 2007)
- (Netherlands) Harm van Veldhoven (July 2007 – November 2008)
- (Belgium) Aime Anthuenis (November 2008 – August 2009)
- (Belgium) Jos Daerden (September 2009 – June 2010)
- (Belgium) Glen De Boeck (July 2010 – November 2010)
- (Belgium) Jacky Mathijssen (December 2010 – March 2012)
- (Belgium) Wim De Corte (March 2012 – July 2012)
- (Netherlands) Adrie Koster (July 2012 – November 2012)
- (Belgium) Wim De Corte (November 2012 – January 2013)
- (Belgium) Jacky Mathijssen (Jan 2013 – May 2013)
