= List of RSC Anderlecht seasons =

This is a list of seasons played by RSC Anderlecht in Belgian and European football since they first played in official competitions in 1909.

Season	League	Cup	Europe	Top scorer
1909–10	3rd in Brabant Division Three (promoted)			Gaston Versé (34)
1910–11	2nd in Brabant Division Two			
1911–12	3rd in Brabant Division Two			
1912–13	1st in Brabant Division Two (promoted)			
1913–14	4th in Promotion			Jacques Sterckval and Joseph Moulart (11)
1919–20	3rd in Promotion			Maurice Versé (13)
1920–21	3rd in Promotion (promoted)			Ferdinand Adams (30)
1921–22	12th in Division I			Joseph Moulart (8)
1922–23	13th in Division I (relegated)			Ferdinand Adams (13)
1923–24	1st in Promotion A (promoted)			Ferdinand Adams (34)
1924–25	9th in Division I			Ferdinand Adams (17)
1925–26	12th in Division I (relegated)			Ferdinand Adams (17)
1926–27	2nd in Division I (promoted)	Quarter-finals		Ferdinand Adams (36)
1927–28	14th in Premier Division (relegated)			Ferdinand Adams (19)
1928–29	2nd in Division I (promoted)			Ferdinand Adams (38)
1929–30	5th in Premier Division			Adolphe Ramburg (14)
1930–31	14th in Premier Division (relegated)			André De Wael and Albert Mettens (10)
1931–32	2nd in Division I A			Georges Van Calenberg (17)
1932–33	5th in Division I A			Joseph Luxen (11)
1933–34	4th in Division I A			Robert Vermaelen (14)
1934–35	1st in Division I B (promoted)			Robert Vermaelen (13)
1935–36	8th in Premier Division			François Gets (17)
1936–37	11th in Premier Division			Michel Vanvarenbergh (9)
1937–38	8th in Premier Division			Florimond De Roeck (11)
1938–39	5th in Premier Division			Michel Vanvarenbergh (13)
1941–42	6th in Premier Division			Michel Vanvarenbergh (12)
1942–43	6th in Premier Division			Joseph Mermans (22)
1943–44	2nd in Premier Division	Quarter-finals		Joseph Mermans (33)
1945–46	3rd in Premier Division			Joseph Mermans (32)
1946–47	1st in Premier Division			Joseph Mermans (38)
1947–48	2nd in Premier Division			Joseph Mermans (23)
1948–49	1st in Premier Division			François De Wael (18)
1949–50	1st in Premier Division			Joseph Mermans (37)
1950–51	1st in Premier Division			Joseph Mermans (16)
1951–52	6th in Premier Division			Joseph Mermans (19)
1952–53	2nd in Division I			Joseph Mermans (24)
1953–54	1st in Division I	First round		Hippolyte Van Den Bosch (29)
1954–55	1st in Division I	First round		Hippolyte Van Den Bosch (25)
1955–56	1st in Division I	Second round	European Cup first round	Hippolyte Van Den Bosch (21)
1956–57	2nd in Division I		European Cup first round	Gaston De Wael (21)
1957–58	5th in Division I			Jacques Stockman (13)
1958–59	1st in Division I			Godfried van den Boer (22)
1959–60	2nd in Division I		European Cup first round	Godfried van den Boer (17)
1960–61	3rd in Division I			Paul Van Himst (13)
1961–62	1st in Division I			Jacques Stockman (29)
1962–63	3rd in Division I		European Cup Quarter-finals	Jacques Stockman (17)
1963–64	1st in Division I	Round of 16		Paul Van Himst (26)
1964–65	1st in Division I	Winners	European Cup first round	Paul Van Himst (24)
1965–66	1st in Division I	Runners-up	European Cup Quarter-finals	Paul Van Himst (26)
1966–67	1st in Division I	Semifinals	European Cup second round	Jan Mulder (20)
1967–68	1st in Division I	Round of 16	European Cup second round	Paul Van Himst (20)
1968–69	4th in Division I	Second round	European Cup second round	Johan Devrindt (14)
1969–70	4th in Division I	Quarter-finals	Inter-Cities Fairs Cup runners-up	Paul Van Himst (15)
1970–71	3rd in Division I	Semifinals	Inter-Cities Fairs Cup third round	Paul Van Himst (16)
1971–72	1st in Division I	Winners	UEFA Cup first round	Jan Mulder (16)
1972–73	6th in Division I	Winners	European Cup second round	Rob Rensenbrink (16)
1973–74	1st in Division I	Round of 16	European Cup Winners' Cup first round	Attila Ladinszky (22)
1974–75	3rd in Division I	Winners	European Cup Quarter-finals	Rob Rensenbrink (19)
1975–76	2nd in Division I	Winners	European Cup Winners' Cup winners	Rob Rensenbrink (23)
1976–77	2nd in Division I	Runners-up	European Cup Winners' Cup runners-up	François Van der Elst (21)
1977–78	2nd in Division I	Round of 16	European Cup Winners' Cup winners	Rob Rensenbrink (18)
1978–79	2nd in Division I	Semifinals	European Cup Winners' Cup second round	Ruud Geels (25)
1979–80	5th in Division I	Quarter-finals	UEFA Cup first round	Ronny Martens (12)
1980–81	1st in Division I	Second round	UEFA Cup first round	Kenneth Brylle (22)
1981–82	2nd in Division I	Round of 16	European Cup Semifinals	Willy Geurts (12)
1982–83	2nd in Division I	Round of 16	UEFA Cup winners	Erwin Vandenbergh (20)
1983–84	2nd in Division I	Second round	UEFA Cup runners-up	Erwin Vandenbergh (20)
1984–85	1st in Division I	Quarter-finals	UEFA Cup third round	Alex Czerniatynski (22)
1985–86	1st in Division I	Second round	European Cup Semifinals	Erwin Vandenbergh (27)
1986–87	1st in Division I	Quarter-finals	European Cup Quarter-finals	Arnor Gudjohnsen (19)
1987–88	4th in Division I	Winners	European Cup Quarter-finals	Luc Nilis (14)
1988–89	2nd in Division I	Winners	European Cup Winners' Cup second round	Eddie Krncevic (23)
1989–90	2nd in Division I	Quarter-finals	European Cup Winners' Cup runners-up	Marc Degryse (18)
1990–91	1st in Division I	Round of 16	UEFA Cup Quarter-finals	Luc Nilis (19)
1991–92	2nd in Division I	Second round	European Cup Group stage	Johnny Bosman (17)
1992–93	1st in Division I	Semifinals	UEFA Cup third round	Luc Nilis (19)
1993–94	1st in Division I	Winners	UEFA Champions League Group stage	Luc Nilis (25)
1994–95	1st in Division I	Semifinals	UEFA Champions League Group stage	Josip Weber (14)
1995–96	2nd in Division I	Quarter-finals	UEFA Champions League Qualifying round	Johnny Bosman and Gilles De Bilde (15)
1996–97	4th in Division I	Runners-up	UEFA Cup Quarter-finals	Pär Zetterberg (12)
1997–98	4th in Division I	Round of 16	UEFA Cup second round	Ole Martin Årst (10)
1998–99	3rd in Division I	First round	UEFA Cup first round	Tomasz Radzinski (15)
1999–2000	1st in Division I	First round	UEFA Cup second round	Jan Koller (20)
2000–01	1st in Division I	Quarter-finals	UEFA Champions League Second group stage	Tomasz Radzinski (23)
2001–02	3rd in Division I	First round	UEFA Champions League Group stage	Gilles De Bilde (11)
2002–03	2nd in Division I	Quarter-finals	UEFA Cup fourth round	Nenad Jestrovic (20)
2003–04	1st in Division I	Semifinals	UEFA Champions League Group stage	Aruna Dindane (15)
2004–05	2nd in Division I	Round of 16	UEFA Champions League group stage	Nenad Jestrovic (18)
2005–06	1st in Division I	First round	UEFA Champions League group stage	Mbo Mpenza (11)
2006–07	1st in Division I	Semifinals	UEFA Champions League group stage	Mohammed Tchité (20)
2007–08	2nd in Division I	Winners	UEFA Cup Round of 16	Nicolas Frutos and Ahmed Hassan (8)
2008–09	2nd in Division I	Round of 16	UEFA Champions League Second qualifying round	Mbark Boussoufa (11)
2009–10	1st in Belgian Pro League	Quarter-finals	UEFA Europa League Round of 16	Romelu Lukaku (15)
2010–11	3rd in Belgian Pro League	Round of 16	UEFA Europa League Round of 32	Romelu Lukaku (16)
2011–12	1st in Belgian Pro League	7th Round	UEFA Europa League Round of 32	Dieumerci Mbokani (14)
2012–13	1st in Belgian Pro League	Semifinals	UEFA Champions League Group stage	Dieumerci Mbokani (19)
2013–14	1st in Belgian Pro League	Round of 16	UEFA Champions League Group stage	Aleksandar Mitrović (16)
2014–15	3rd in Belgian Pro League	Runners-up	UEFA Europa League Round of 32	Aleksandar Mitrović (20)
2015–16	2nd in Belgian Pro League	7th Round	UEFA Europa League Round of 16	Stefano Okaka (15)
2016–17	1st in Belgian Pro League	7th Round	UEFA Europa League Quarter finals	Łukasz Teodorczyk (22)
2017–18	3rd in Belgian Pro League	7th Round	UEFA Champions League Group stage	Łukasz Teodorczyk (15)
2018–19	6th in Belgian Pro League	6th Round	UEFA Europa League Group stage	Ivan Santini (16)
2019–20	8th in Belgian Pro League	Quarter-finals	—	Michel Vlap (11)
2020–21	4th in Belgian Pro League	Semi-finals	—	Lukas Nmecha (21)
2021–22	3rd in Belgian Pro League	Runners-up	UEFA Europa Conference League Fourth qualifying round	Lior Refaelov (19)
2022–23	11th in Belgian Pro League	Round of 16	UEFA Europa Conference League Quarter finals	Islam Slimani (8)
2023–24	3rd in Belgian Pro League	Quarter-finals	—	Anders Dreyer (15)
2024–25	4th in Belgian Pro League	Runners-up	UEFA Europa League Knockout phase play-offs	Kasper Dolberg (14)
