= 1930–31 in Belgian football =

Football in Belgium
- Season: 1930–31

The 1930–31 season was the 31st season of competitive football in Belgium. R Antwerp FC won their second Premier Division title.
From the next season on, Division I was expanded from one division to two (both of 14 clubs), and Promotion was extended from three divisions to four (also of 14 clubs each). Therefore, many clubs from Promotion promoted to Division I.

== Overview ==
At the end of the season, RFC Montegnée and SC Anderlechtois were relegated to the Division I, while RRC de Gand (Division I winner) and FC Turnhout were promoted to the Premier Division.
The Promotion – the third level in Belgian football – was won by AS Ostende, Hoboken SK and RC Tirlemont, who were promoted to Division I as well as the 2nd, 3rd and 4th placed clubs from the 3 leagues and the 2 best 5th-placed teams. No clubs were relegated from Division I to Promotion.

== National team ==
Date	Venue	Opponents	Score*	Comp	Belgium scorers	Match Report
September 21, 1930	Bosuilstadion, Antwerp (H)	Czechoslovakia	2-3	F	Louis Versyp, Bernard Voorhoof	FA website
September 28, 1930	Stade du Pont d'Ougrée, Liège (H)	Sweden	2–2	F	Jacques Secretin, Pierre Braine	FA website
December 7, 1930	Stade Buffalo, Paris (A)	France	2-2	F	Joseph Van Beeck, Bernard Voorhoof	FA website
March 29, 1931	Olympic Stadium, Amsterdam (A)	The Netherlands	2-3	F	Louis Versyp, Bernard Voorhoof	FA website
May 3, 1931	Bosuilstadion, Antwerp (H)	The Netherlands	4-2	F	Bernard Voorhoof (2), Stanley Vanden Eynde, Louis Versyp	FA website
May 16, 1931	Oscaer Bossaert Stadium, Brussels (H)	England	1-4	F	Jean Capelle	FA website
May 31, 1931	Estadio Do Lumiar, Lisbon (A)	Portugal	2–3	F	Joseph Van Beeck, August Hellemans	FA website

* Belgium score given first

Key

- H = Home match
- A = Away match
- N = On neutral ground
- F = Friendly
- o.g. = own goal

== Honours ==
Competition	Winner
Premier Division	R Antwerp FC
Division I	RRC de Gand
Promotion	AS Ostende, Hoboken SK and RC Tirlemont

== Final league tables ==
=== Division I ===
Pos	Team	Pld	Won	Drw	Lst	GF	GA	Pts	GD	Notes
1	RRC de Gand	26	16	5	5	74	36	37	+38	Promoted to Premier Division.
2	FC Turnhout	26	15	6	5	82	38	36	+44	Promoted to Premier Division.
3	RRC de Bruxelles	26	14	6	6	70	42	34	+28	
4	ARA La Gantoise	26	14	5	7	81	46	33	+35	
5	TSV Lyra	26	13	3	10	61	51	29	+10	
6	CS La Forestoise	26	13	2	11	62	51	28	+11	
7	Belgica FC Edegem	26	10	7	9	68	48	27	+20	
8	CS Schaerbeek	26	11	5	10	69	69	27	0	
9	Charleroi SC	26	8	10	8	44	55	26	-11	
10	Uccle Sport	26	9	6	11	45	58	24	-13	
11	SK Roulers	26	10	3	13	51	68	23	-17	
12	EFC Hasselt	26	6	6	14	56	67	18	-11	
13	Tilleur FC	26	7	2	17	42	85	16	-43	
14	RFC Liégeois	26	3	0	23	27	118	6	-91	
