= 1929–30 in Belgian football =

Football in Belgium
- Season: 1929–30

The 1929–30 season was the 30th season of competitive football in Belgium. The Belgium national football team were one of the 4 European nations to enter the first FIFA World Cup, organized in Uruguay. They were drawn in group 4 with United States and Paraguay but lost both of their matches. RCS Brugeois won their third Premier Division title by finishing one point ahead of title contender R Antwerp FC.

== Overview ==
At the end of the season, RRC de Bruxelles and RRC de Gand were relegated to the Division I, while RFC Montegnée (Division I winner) and Tubantia FAC were promoted to the Premier Division. The Promotion – the third level in Belgian football – was won by CS Schaerbeek, Belgica FC Edegem and EFC Hasselt. The three clubs were replaced by the 12th, 13th and 14th placed teams in the Division I, i.e. respectively White Star AC, Vilvorde FC and RCS Verviétois.

== National team ==
Date	Venue	Opponents	Score*	Comp	Belgium scorers	Match Report
April 13, 1930	Stade Olympique de Colombes, Paris (A)	France	6–1	F	Louis Versyp (2), Ferdinand Adams, Michel Vanderbauwhede (3)	FA website
May 4, 1930	Olympic Stadium, Amsterdam (A)	The Netherlands	2–2	F	Désiré Bastin, Ferdinand Adams	FA website
May 11, 1930	Oscar Bossaert Stadium, Brussels (H)	Irish Free State	1–3	F	Désiré Bastin	FA website
May 18, 1930	Olympisch Stadion, Antwerp (H)	The Netherlands	3–1	F	Bernard Voorhoof, Désiré Bastin, Denis (o.g.)	FA website
May 25, 1930	Stade du Pont d'Ougrée, Liège (H)	France	1–2	F	Bernard Voorhoof	FA website
June 8, 1930	Bosuilstadion, Antwerp (H)	Portugal	2–1	F	Michel Vanderbauwhede, Désiré Bastin	FA website
July 13, 1930	Estadio Gran Parque Central, Montevideo (N)	United States	0–3	WCFR		FA website
July 20, 1930	Estadio Centenario, Montevideo (N)	Paraguay	0–1	WCFR		FA website

* Belgium score given first

Key

- H = Home match
- A = Away match
- N = On neutral ground
- F = Friendly
- WCFR = World Cup first round
- o.g. = own goal

== Honours ==
Competition	Winner
Premier Division	RCS Brugeois
Division I	RFC Montegnée
Promotion	CS Schaerbeek, Belgica FC Edegem and EFC Hasselt

== Final league tables ==
=== Division I ===
Pos	Team	Pld	Won	Drw	Lst	GF	GA	Pts	GD	Notes
1	RFC Montegnée	26	16	5	5	74	36	37	+38	Promoted to Premier Division.
2	Tubantia FAC	26	15	6	5	82	38	36	+44	Promoted to Premier Division.
3	CS La Forestoise	26	14	6	6	70	42	34	+28	
4	ARA La Gantoise	26	14	5	7	81	46	33	+35	
5	RFC Liégeois	26	13	3	10	61	51	29	+10	
6	FC Turnhout	26	13	2	11	62	51	28	+11	
7	Tilleur FC	26	10	7	9	68	48	27	+20	
8	TSV Lyra	26	11	5	10	69	69	27	0	
9	Uccle Sport	26	8	10	8	44	55	26	−11	
10	Charleroi SC	26	9	6	11	45	58	24	−13	
11	SK Roulers	26	10	3	13	51	68	23	−17	
12	White Star AC	26	6	6	14	56	67	18	−11	Relegated to Promotion.
13	Vilvorde FC	26	7	2	17	42	85	16	−43	Relegated to Promotion.
14	RCS Verviétois	26	3	0	23	27	118	6	−91	Relegated to Promotion.
