= 1932–33 in Belgian football =

Football in Belgium
- Season: 1932–33

The 1932–33 season was the 33rd season of competitive football in Belgium. RU Saint-Gilloise won their 9th Premier Division title.

== Overview ==
At the end of the season, RFC Brugeois and Berchem Sport were relegated to the Division I, while Belgica FC Edegem (Division I A winner) and R Tilleur FC (Division I B winner) were promoted to the Premier Division. The Promotion was won by CS Saint-Josse, Cappellen FC, Wallonia Namur and Patria FC Tongres. The four clubs were promoted to the Division I while R Knokke FC, Oude God Sport, RFC Montegnée and EFC Hasselt were relegated from the Division I to the Promotion.

== National team ==
Date	Venue	Opponents	Score*	Comp	Belgium scorers
December 11, 1932	Heysel Stadium, Brussels (H)	Austria	1-6	F	Vital Van Landegem
February 12, 1933	Heysel Stadium, Brussels (H)	Italy	2–3	F	Bernard Voorhoof (2)
March 12, 1933	Hardturm, Zürich (A)	Switzerland	3-3	F	Joseph Desmedt, Bernard Voorhoof (2)
March 26, 1933	Stade Olympique de Colombes, Colombes (A)	France	0-3	F
April 9, 1933	Bosuilstadion, Antwerp (H)	The Netherlands	1-3	F	André Saeys
May 7, 1933	Olympic Stadium, Amsterdam (A)	The Netherlands	2-1	F	Joseph Desmedt, Bernard Voorhoof
June 4, 1933	Polish Army Stadium, Warsaw (A)	Poland	1–0	F	Jean Brichaut
June 11, 1933	Praterstadion, Vienna (A)	Austria	1–4	F	Bernard Voorhoof

* Belgium score given first

Key

- H = Home match
- A = Away match
- N = On neutral ground
- F = Friendly
- o.g. = own goal

== Honours ==
Competition	Winner
Premier Division	RU Saint-Gilloise
Division I	Belgica FC Edegem and R Tilleur FC
Promotion	CS Saint-Josse, Cappellen FC, Wallonia Namur and Patria FC Tongres
