= 1937–38 in Belgian football =

Football in Belgium
- Season: 1937–38

1937–38 was the 38th season of competitive football in Belgium. The Belgium national football team qualified for the 1938 FIFA World Cup, for the 3rd consecutive year but lost in the first round to the organising country, France (1-3). R Beerschot AC won their 6th Premier Division title.

== Overview ==
The national team qualified for the 1938 FIFA World Cup by beating Luxembourg and drawing with the Netherlands. They lost in the round of 16 in the World Cup finals against France.

At the end of the season, TSV Lyra and RC Tirlemont were relegated to Division I, while Boom FC (Division I A winner) and RCS Brugeois (Division I B winner) were promoted to the Premier Division.
RFC Montegnée, FC Duffel, RRC de Gand and VG Ostende were relegated from Division I to Promotion, to be replaced by CS Visétois, REFC Hasselt, RRC de Bruxelles and AS Ostende.

== National team ==
Date	Venue	Opponents	Score*	Comp	Belgium scorers
January 30, 1938	Parc des Princes, Paris (A)	France	3-5	F	Raymond Braine, Bernard Voorhoof, Stanley Vanden Eynde
February 27, 1938	Feijenoord Stadion, Rotterdam (A)	Netherlands	2-7	F	Raymond Braine, Bernard Voorhoof
March 13, 1938	Stade Municipal, Luxembourg (A)	Luxembourg	3-2	WCQ	Bernard Voorhoof, Raymond Braine, François De Vries
April 3, 1938	Olympisch Stadion, Antwerp (H)	Netherlands	1-1	WCQ	Hendrik Isemborghs
May 8, 1938	Stade Olympique de la Pontaise, Lausanne (A)	Switzerland	3-0	F	Bernard Voorhoof (2), Jean Capelle
May 15, 1938	San Siro, Milan (A)	Italy	1-6	F	Jean Capelle
May 29, 1938	Heysel Stadium, Brussels (H)	Yugoslavia	2-2	F	Jean Capelle, Charles Vanden Wouwer
June 5, 1938	Stade Olympique de Colombes, Colombes (N)	France	1-3	WCFR	Henri Isemborghs

* Belgium score given first

Key

- H = Home match
- A = Away match
- N = On neutral ground
- F = Friendly
- WCQ = World Cup qualification
- WCFR = World Cup first round
- o.g. = own goal

== Honours ==
Competition	Winner
Premier Division	R Beerschot AC
Division I	Boom FC and RCS Brugeois
Promotion	CS Visétois, REFC Hasselt, RRC de Bruxelles and AS Ostende
