= 1933–34 in Belgian football =

Football in Belgium
- Season: 1933–34

The 1933–34 season was the 34th season of competitive football in Belgium. The Belgium national football team qualified for the 1934 FIFA World Cup in Italy but they lost in the first round to Germany (2–5). RU Saint-Gilloise became the first club to win 10 Premier Division titles.

== Overview ==
Belgium qualified for the FIFA World Cup finals for the second time by finishing in second place of European Group 7, ahead of Irish Free State on goal average. Belgium then lost in the round of 16 of the World Cup finals to Germany, who would eventually finish 3rd.

At the end of the season, RRC de Bruxelles and R Tilleur FC were relegated to Division I, while White Star AC (Division I A winner) and Berchem Sport (Division I B winner) were promoted to the Premier Division.
R Stade Louvaniste, CS Saint-Josse, R Union Hutoise FC and Wallonia Namur were relegated to Promotion, to be replaced by ARA Termondoise, Oude God Sport, RFC Montegnée and AS Herstal.

== National team ==
Date	Venue	Opponents	Score*	Comp	Belgium scorers
October 22, 1933	Wedaustadion, Duisburg (A)	Germany	1-8	F	Robert Lamoot
November 26, 1933	Heysel Stadium, Brussels (H)	Denmark	2–2	F	Louis Versyp, Stanley Vanden Eynde
January 21, 1934	Heysel Stadium, Brussels (H)	France	2-3	F	Bernard Voorhoof, Stanley Vanden Eynde
February 25, 1934	Dalymount Park, Dublin (A)	Irish Free State	4-4	WCQ	Jean Capelle, Stanley Vanden Eynde, François Van Den Eynde (2)
March 11, 1934	Olympic Stadium, Amsterdam (A)	The Netherlands	3-9	F	Bernard Voorhoof, Jean Brichaut, Louis Versyp
April 29, 1934	Bosuilstadion, Antwerp (H)	The Netherlands	2-4	WCQ	Laurent Grimmonprez, Bernard Voorhoof
May 27, 1934	Stadio Giovanni Berta, Florence (N)	Germany	2-5	WCFR	Bernard Voorhoof (2)

* Belgium score given first

Key

- H = Home match
- A = Away match
- N = On neutral ground
- F = Friendly
- WCQ = World Cup qualification
- WCFR = World Cup first round
- o.g. = own goal

== Honours ==
Competition	Winner
Premier Division	RU Saint-Gilloise
Division I	White Star AC and Berchem Sport
Promotion	ARA Termondoise, Oude God Sport, RFC Montegnée and AS Herstal
