= 1936–37 in Belgian football =

Football in Belgium
- Season: 1936–37

The 1936–37 season was the 37th season of competitive football in Belgium. R Daring Club de Bruxelles won their 5th and last Premier Division title.

== Overview ==
At the end of the season, FC Turnhout and RRC de Malines were relegated to Division I, while RC Tirlemont (Division I A winner) and OC Charleroi (Division I B winner) were promoted to the Premier Division.
Stade Waremmien, RRC de Bruxelles, AS Ostende and Hoboken SK were relegated from Promotion to Division I, to be replaced by R Charleroi SC, FC Wilrijck, R Vilvorde FC and AS Renaisienne.

== National team ==
Date	Venue	Opponents	Score*	Comp	Belgium scorers
February 21, 1937	Heysel Stadium, Brussels (H)	France	3-1	F	Raymond Braine, Arthur Ceuleers, Stanley Vanden Eynde
April 4, 1937	Bosuilstadion, Antwerp (H)	The Netherlands	2-1	F	Arthur Ceuleers, Jean Fievez
April 18, 1937	Heysel Stadium, Brussels (H)	Switzerland	1-2	F	Bernard Voorhoof
April 25, 1937	Hindenburg-Kampfbahn, Hanover (A)	Germany	0-1	F
May 2, 1937	Feijenoord Stadion, Rotterdam (A)	The Netherlands	0-1	F
June 6, 1937	FK BASK, Belgrade (A)	Yugoslavia	1-1	F	Jean Capelle
June 10, 1937	Stadionul ONEF, Bucharest (A)	Romania	1-2	F	Bernard Voorhoof

* Belgium score given first

Key

- H = Home match
- A = Away match
- N = On neutral ground
- F = Friendly
- o.g. = own goal

== Honours ==
Competition	Winner
Premier Division	R Daring Club de Bruxelles
Division I	RC Tirlemont and OC Charleroi
Promotion	R Charleroi SC, FC Wilrijck, R Vilvorde FC and AS Renaisienne
