= RSC Anderlecht in European football =

- Club: RSC Anderlecht
- Seasons played: 64
- First entry: 1955–56 European Cup
- Latest entry: 2026–27 UEFA Europa League

Titles
- Europa League: 1983
- Cup Winners' Cup: 1976, 1978
- Super Cup: 1976, 1978

The first time RSC Anderlecht qualified for European football was in 1955. The last time they were in European football is in 2025. In that time-frame they have won five titles in European football. They won the UEFA Cup in 1983, the Cup Winners' Cup in 1976 and 1978, and the Super Cup in 1976 and 1978. Anderlecht are by far the most successful football club in Belgian football history.

Former chairman Constant Vanden Stock admitted to bribing the referee Emilio Guruceta in the return leg against Nottingham Forest in the semi-final of the 1984 UEFA Cup.

== European record ==
=== Overall record ===
As of 16 September 2026

| Competition | Pld | W | D | L | GF | GA | GD | Win% |
|---|---|---|---|---|---|---|---|---|
| European Cup / Champions League | 200 | 70 | 44 | 86 | 282 | 320 | −38 | 35.00 |
| UEFA Cup Winners' Cup | 44 | 29 | 3 | 12 | 86 | 34 | +52 | 65.91 |
| UEFA Cup / Europa League | 175 | 85 | 42 | 48 | 290 | 205 | +85 | 48.57 |
| UEFA Conference League | 23 | 11 | 6 | 6 | 32 | 19 | +13 | 47.83 |
| Inter-Cities Fairs Cup | 18 | 13 | 0 | 5 | 51 | 27 | +24 | 72.22 |
| UEFA Super Cup | 4 | 2 | 0 | 2 | 9 | 6 | +3 | 50.00 |
| Total | 454 | 206 | 92 | 156 | 742 | 602 | +140 | 45.37 |

Pld = matches played, W = won, D = drawn, L = lost, GF = goals for, GA = goals against, GD = goal difference.

=== Matches ===
| Season | Competition | Round | Opponent | Home | Away |
|---|---|---|---|---|---|
| 1955–56 | European Cup | First round | (Hungary) Vörös Lobogó SE | 1–4 | 3–6 |
| 1956–57 | European Cup | Preliminary round | (England) Manchester United | 0–2 | 0–10 |
| 1959–60 | European Cup | Preliminary round | (Scotland) Rangers | 0–2 | 2–5 |
| 1962–63 | European Cup | Preliminary round | (Spain) Real Madrid | 1–0 | 3–3 |
| 1962–63 | European Cup | First round | (Bulgaria) CDNA Sofia | 2–0 | 2–2 |
| 1962–63 | European Cup | Quarter-final | (Scotland) Dundee | 1–4 | 1–2 |
| 1964–65 | European Cup | Preliminary round | (Italy) Bologna | 1–0 | 1–2 (Note: Play off game finished 0–0 with Anderlecht winning a coin toss to progress to the next round) |
| 1964–65 | European Cup | First round | (England) Liverpool | 0–1 | 0–3 |
| 1965–66 | European Cup | Preliminary round | (Turkey) Fenerbahçe | 5–1 | 0–0 |
| 1965–66 | European Cup | First round | (Northern Ireland) Derry City | 9–0 | w/o (Note: Game was put down as a walk-over due to the withdrawal of Derry) |
| 1965–66 | European Cup | Quarter-final | (Spain) Real Madrid | 1–0 | 2–4 |
| 1966–67 | European Cup | First round | (Finland) Haka | 2–0 | 10–1 |
| 1966–67 | European Cup | Second round | (Czechoslovakia) Dukla Prague | 1–2 | 1–4 |
| 1967–68 | European Cup | First round | (East Germany) Karl-Marx-Stadt | 2–1 | 3–1 |
| 1967–68 | European Cup | Second round | (Czechoslovakia) Sparta Prague | 3–3 | 2–3 |
| 1968–69 | European Cup | First round | (Northern Ireland) Glentoran | 3–0 | 2–2 |
| 1968–69 | European Cup | Second round | (England) Manchester United | 3–1 | 0–3 |
| 1969–70 | Inter-Cities Fairs Cup | First round | (Iceland) Valur | 2–0 | 6–0 |
| 1969–70 | Inter-Cities Fairs Cup | Second round | (Northern Ireland) Coleraine | 6–1 | 7–3 |
| 1969–70 | Inter-Cities Fairs Cup | Third round | (Scotland) Dunfermline Athletic | 1–0 | 2–3 |
| 1969–70 | Inter-Cities Fairs Cup | Quarter-final | (England) Newcastle United | 2–0 | 1–3 |
| 1969–70 | Inter-Cities Fairs Cup | Semi-final | (Italy) Internazionale | 0–1 | 2–0 |
| 1969–70 | Inter-Cities Fairs Cup | Final | (England) Arsenal | 3–1 | 0–3 |
| 1970–71 | Inter-Cities Fairs Cup | First round | (Socialist Federal Republic of Yugoslavia) Željezničar | 5–4 | 4–3 |
| 1970–71 | Inter-Cities Fairs Cup | Second round | (Denmark) AB | 4–0 | 3–1 |
| 1970–71 | Inter-Cities Fairs Cup | Third round | (Portugal) Vitória de Setúbal | 2–1 | 1–3 |
| 1971–72 | UEFA Cup | First round | (Italy) Bologna | 0–2 | 1–1 |
| 1972–73 | European Cup | First round | (Denmark) Vejle BK | 4–2 | 3–0 |
| 1972–73 | European Cup | Second round | (Czechoslovakia) Spartak Trnava | 0–1 | 0–1 |
| 1973–74 | Cup Winners' Cup | First round | (Switzerland) Zürich | 3–2 | 0–1 |
| 1974–75 | European Cup | First round | (Czechoslovakia) Slovan Bratislava | 3–1 | 2–4 |
| 1974–75 | European Cup | Second round | (Greece) Olympiacos | 5–1 | 0–3 |
| 1974–75 | European Cup | Quarter-final | (England) Leeds United | 0–1 | 0–3 |
| 1975–76 | Cup Winners' Cup | First round | (Romania) Rapid București | 2–0 | 0–1 |
| 1975–76 | Cup Winners' Cup | Second round | (Socialist Federal Republic of Yugoslavia) Borac Banja Luka | 3–0 | 0–1 |
| 1975–76 | Cup Winners' Cup | Quarter-final | (Wales) Wrexham | 1–0 | 1–1 |
| 1975–76 | Cup Winners' Cup | Semi-final | (East Germany) Sachsenring Zwickau | 2–0 | 3–0 |
| 1975–76 | Cup Winners' Cup | Final | (England) West Ham United | 4–2 | |
| 1976 | European Super Cup | Final | (West Germany) Bayern Munich | 4–1 | 1–2 |
| 1976–77 | Cup Winners' Cup | First round | (Netherlands) Roda JC | 2–1 | 3–2 |
| 1976–77 | Cup Winners' Cup | Second round | (Turkey) Galatasaray | 5–1 | 5–1 |
| 1976–77 | Cup Winners' Cup | Quarter-final | (England) Southampton | 2–0 | 1–2 |
| 1976–77 | Cup Winners' Cup | Semi-final | (Italy) Napoli | 2–0 | 0–1 |
| 1976–77 | Cup Winners' Cup | Final | (West Germany) Hamburger SV | 0–2 | |
| 1977–78 | Cup Winners' Cup | First round | (Bulgaria) Lokomotiv Sofia | 2–0 | 6–1 |
| 1977–78 | Cup Winners' Cup | Second round | (West Germany) Hamburger SV | 1–1 | 2–1 |
| 1977–78 | Cup Winners' Cup | Quarter-final | (Portugal) Porto | 3–0 | 0–1 |
| 1977–78 | Cup Winners' Cup | Semi-final | (Netherlands) Twente | 2–0 | 1–0 |
| 1977–78 | Cup Winners' Cup | Final | Austria Wien | 4–0 | |
| 1978 | European Super Cup | Final | (England) Liverpool | 3–1 | 1–2 |
| 1978–79 | Cup Winners' Cup | Second round (Note: Anderlecht were given a bye in to the second round) | (Spain) Barcelona | 3–0 | 0–3 (1–4 p) |
| 1979–80 | UEFA Cup | First round | (Scotland) Dundee United | 1–1 | 0–0 |
| 1980–81 | UEFA Cup | First round | (West Germany) 1. FC Kaiserslautern | 3–2 | 0–1 |
| 1981–82 | European Cup | First round | (Poland) Widzew Łódź | 2–1 | 4–1 |
| 1981–82 | European Cup | Second round | (Italy) Juventus | 3–1 | 1–1 |
| 1981–82 | European Cup | Quarter-final | (Socialist Federal Republic of Yugoslavia) Red Star Belgrade | 2–1 | 2–1 |
| 1981–82 | European Cup | Semi-final | (England) Aston Villa | 0–0 | 0–1 |
| 1982–83 | UEFA Cup | First round | (Finland) Koparit Kuopio | 3–0 | 3–1 |
| 1982–83 | UEFA Cup | Second round | (Portugal) Porto | 4–0 | 2–3 |
| 1982–83 | UEFA Cup | Third round | (Socialist Federal Republic of Yugoslavia) FK Sarajevo | 6–1 | 0–1 |
| 1982–83 | UEFA Cup | Quarter-final | (Spain) Valencia | 3–1 | 2–1 |
| 1982–83 | UEFA Cup | Semi-final | (Czechoslovakia) Bohemians Prague | 3–1 | 1–0 |
| 1982–83 | UEFA Cup | Final | (Portugal) Benfica | 1–0 | 1–1 |
| 1983–84 | UEFA Cup | First round | (Norway) Bryne | 1–1 | 3–0 |
| 1983–84 | UEFA Cup | Second round | (Czechoslovakia) Baník Ostrava | 2–0 | 2–2 |
| 1983–84 | UEFA Cup | Third round | (France) Lens | 1–0 | 1–1 |
| 1983–84 | UEFA Cup | Quarter-final | (Soviet Union) Spartak Moscow | 4–2 | 0–1 |
| 1983–84 | UEFA Cup | Semi-final | (England) Nottingham Forest | 3–0 (Note: Anderlecht chairman Vanden Stock admitted to bribing the referee in charge, who awarded Anderlecht a controversial penalty and disallowed a late Forest goal.) | 0–2 |
| 1983–84 | UEFA Cup | Final | (England) Tottenham Hotspur | 1–1 | 1–1 (3–4 p) |
| 1984–85 | UEFA Cup | First round | (West Germany) Werder Bremen | 1–0 | 1–2 |
| 1984–85 | UEFA Cup | Second round | (Italy) Fiorentina | 6–2 | 1–1 |
| 1984–85 | UEFA Cup | Third round | (Spain) Real Madrid | 3–0 | 1–6 |
| 1985–86 | European Cup | First round | (England) Everton | - | (Note: Everton were unable to fulfill this fixture due to the ban on English clubs entering European competition following the Heysel Stadium disaster in 1985.) |
| 1985–86 | European Cup | Second round | (Cyprus) Omonia | 1–0 | 3–1 |
| 1985–86 | European Cup | Quarter-final | (West Germany) Bayern Munich | 2–0 | 1–2 |
| 1985–86 | European Cup | Semi-final | (Romania) Steaua București | 1–0 | 0–3 |
| 1986–87 | European Cup | First round | (Poland) Górnik Zabrze | 2–0 | 1–1 |
| 1986–87 | European Cup | Second round | (Romania) Steaua București | 3–0 | 0–1 |
| 1986–87 | European Cup | Quarter-final | (West Germany) Bayern Munich | 2–2 | 0–5 |
| 1987–88 | European Cup | First round | (Sweden) Malmö FF | 1–1 | 1–0 |
| 1987–88 | European Cup | Second round | (Czechoslovakia) Sparta Prague | 1–0 | 2–1 |
| 1987–88 | European Cup | Quarter-final | (Portugal) Benfica | 1–0 | 0–2 |
| 1988–89 | Cup Winners' Cup | First round | (France) Metz | 2–0 | 3–1 |
| 1988–89 | Cup Winners' Cup | Second round | (Belgium) KV Mechelen | 0–2 | 0–1 |
| 1989–90 | Cup Winners' Cup | First round | (Northern Ireland) Ballymena United | 6–0 | 4–0 |
| 1989–90 | Cup Winners' Cup | Second round | (Spain) Barcelona | 2–0 | 1–2 (a.e.t.) |
| 1989–90 | Cup Winners' Cup | Quarter-final | (Austria) FC Admira/Wacker | 2–0 | 1–1 |
| 1989–90 | Cup Winners' Cup | Semi-final | (Romania) Dinamo București | 1–0 | 1–0 |
| 1989–90 | Cup Winners' Cup | Final | (Italy) Sampdoria | 0–2 (a.e.t.) | |
| 1990–91 | UEFA Cup | First round | (Romania) Petrolul Ploiești | 2–0 | 2–0 |
| 1990–91 | UEFA Cup | Second round | (Cyprus) Omonia | 3–0 | 1–1 |
| 1990–91 | UEFA Cup | Third round | (Germany) Borussia Dortmund | 1–0 | 1–2 |
| 1990–91 | UEFA Cup | Quarter-final | (Italy) Roma | 2–3 | 0–3 |
| 1991–92 | European Cup | First round | (Switzerland) Grasshopper | 1–1 | 3–0 |
| 1991–92 | European Cup | Second round | (Netherlands) PSV Eindhoven | 2–0 | 0–0 |
| 1991–92 | European Cup | Group A | (Greece) Panathinaikos | 0–0 | 0–0 |
| 1991–92 | European Cup | Group A | (Socialist Federal Republic of Yugoslavia) Red Star Belgrade | 3–2 | 2–3 |
| 1991–92 | European Cup | Group A | (Italy) Sampdoria | 3–2 | 0–2 |
| 1992–93 | UEFA Cup | First round | (Scotland) Hibernian | 1–1 | 2–2 |
| 1992–93 | UEFA Cup | Second round | (Ukraine) Dynamo Kyiv | 4–2 | 3–0 |
| 1992–93 | UEFA Cup | Third round | (France) Paris Saint-Germain | 1–1 | 0–0 |
| 1993–94 | Champions League | First round | (Finland) HJK | 3–0 | 3–0 |
| 1993–94 | Champions League | Second round | (Czech Republic) Sparta Prague | 4–2 | 1–0 |
| 1993–94 | Champions League | Group B | (Italy) Milan | 0–0 | 0–0 |
| 1993–94 | Champions League | Group B | (Germany) Werder Bremen | 1–2 | 3–5 |
| 1993–94 | Champions League | Group B | (Portugal) Porto | 1–0 | 0–2 |
| 1994–95 | Champions League | Group C | (Romania) Steaua București | 0–0 | 1–1 |
| 1994–95 | Champions League | Group C | (Portugal) Benfica | 1–1 | 1–3 |
| 1994–95 | Champions League | Group C | (Croatia) Hajduk Split | 0–0 | 1–2 |
| 1995–96 | Champions League | Qualifying round | (Hungary) Ferencváros | 0–1 | 1–1 |
| 1996–97 | UEFA Cup | First round | (Russia) Alania Vladikavkaz | 4–0 | 1–2 |
| 1996–97 | UEFA Cup | Second round | (Portugal) Vitória de Guimarães | 0–0 | 1–1 |
| 1996–97 | UEFA Cup | Third round | (Sweden) Helsingborgs IF | 1–0 | 0–0 |
| 1996–97 | UEFA Cup | Quarter-final | (Italy) Internazionale | 1–1 | 1–2 |
| 1997–98 | UEFA Cup | Second Qualifying round | (Ukraine) Vorskla Poltava | 2–0 | 2–0 |
| 1997–98 | UEFA Cup | First round | Austria Salzburg | 4–2 | 3–4 |
| 1997–98 | UEFA Cup | Second round | (Germany) Schalke 04 | 1–2 | 0–1 |
| 1998–99 | UEFA Cup | First qualifying round | (Moldova) Tiligul Tiraspol | 5–0 | 1–0 |
| 1998–99 | UEFA Cup | Second qualifying round | (Croatia) Osijek | 2–0 | 1–3 |
| 1998–99 | UEFA Cup | First round | (Switzerland) Grasshopper | 0–2 | 0–0 |
| 1999–2000 | UEFA Cup | Qualifying round | (Iceland) KS/Leiftur | 6–1 | 3–0 |
| 1999–2000 | UEFA Cup | First round | (Slovenia) Olimpija Ljubljana | 3–1 | 3–0 |
| 1999–2000 | UEFA Cup | Second round | (Italy) Bologna | 2–1 | 0–3 |
| 2000–01 | Champions League | Second qualifying round | (Cyprus) Anorthosis Famagusta | 4–2 | 0–0 |
| 2000–01 | Champions League | Third qualifying round | (Portugal) Porto | 1–0 | 0–0 |
| 2000–01 | Champions League | Group G | (England) Manchester United | 2–1 | 1–5 |
| 2000–01 | Champions League | Group G | (Netherlands) PSV Eindhoven | 1–0 | 3–2 |
| 2000–01 | Champions League | Group G | (Ukraine) Dynamo Kyiv | 4–2 | 0–4 |
| 2000–01 | Champions League | Group D | (Italy) Lazio | 1–0 | 1–2 |
| 2000–01 | Champions League | Group D | (Spain) Real Madrid | 2–0 | 1–4 |
| 2000–01 | Champions League | Group D | (England) Leeds United | 1–4 | 1–2 |
| 2001–02 | Champions League | Second qualifying round | (Moldova) Sheriff Tiraspol | 4–0 | 2–1 |
| 2001–02 | Champions League | Third qualifying round | (Sweden) Halmstads BK | 1–1 | 3–2 |
| 2001–02 | Champions League | Group A | (Russia) Lokomotiv Moscow | 1–5 | 1–1 |
| 2001–02 | Champions League | Group A | (Italy) Roma | 0–0 | 1–1 |
| 2001–02 | Champions League | Group A | (Spain) Real Madrid | 0–2 | 1–4 |
| 2002–03 | UEFA Cup | First round | (Norway) Stabæk | 0–1 | 2–1 |
| 2002–03 | UEFA Cup | Second round | (Denmark) Midtjylland | 3–1 | 3–0 |
| 2002–03 | UEFA Cup | Third round | (France) Bordeaux | 2–2 | 2–0 |
| 2002–03 | UEFA Cup | Fourth round | (Greece) Panathinaikos | 2–0 | 0–3 |
| 2003–04 | Champions League | Second qualifying round | (Romania) Rapid București | 3–2 | 0–0 |
| 2003–04 | Champions League | Third qualifying round | (Poland) Wisła Kraków | 3–1 | 1–0 |
| 2003–04 | Champions League | Group A | (France) Lyon | 1–0 | 0–1 |
| 2003–04 | Champions League | Group A | (Germany) Bayern Munich | 1–1 | 0–1 |
| 2003–04 | Champions League | Group A | (Scotland) Celtic | 1–0 | 1–3 |
| 2004–05 | Champions League | Third qualifying round | (Portugal) Benfica | 3–0 | 0–1 |
| 2004–05 | Champions League | Group G | (Spain) Valencia | 1–2 | 0–2 |
| 2004–05 | Champions League | Group G | (Italy) Internazionale | 1–3 | 0–3 |
| 2004–05 | Champions League | Group G | (Germany) Werder Bremen | 1–2 | 1–5 |
| 2005–06 | Champions League | Second qualifying round | (Azerbaijan) Neftchi Baku | 5–0 | 0–1 |
| 2005–06 | Champions League | Third qualifying round | (Czech Republic) Slavia Prague | 2–1 | 2–0 |
| 2005–06 | Champions League | Group G | (England) Chelsea | 0–2 | 0–1 |
| 2005–06 | Champions League | Group G | (Spain) Real Betis | 0–1 | 1–0 |
| 2005–06 | Champions League | Group G | (England) Liverpool | 0–1 | 0–3 |
| 2006–07 | Champions League | Group H | (France) Lille | 1–1 | 2–2 |
| 2006–07 | Champions League | Group H | (Greece) AEK Athens | 2–2 | 1–1 |
| 2006–07 | Champions League | Group H | (Italy) Milan | 0–1 | 1–4 |
| 2007–08 | Champions League | Third qualifying round | (Turkey) Fenerbahçe | 0–2 | 0–1 |
| 2007–08 | UEFA Cup | First round | (Austria) Rapid Wien | 1–1 | 1–0 |
| 2007–08 | UEFA Cup | Group G | (Israel) Hapoel Tel Aviv | 2–0 | N/A |
| 2007–08 | UEFA Cup | Group G | (Denmark) AaB | N/A | 1–1 |
| 2007–08 | UEFA Cup | Group G | (England) Tottenham Hotspur | 1–1 | N/A |
| 2007–08 | UEFA Cup | Group G | (Spain) Getafe | N/A | 1–2 |
| 2007–08 | UEFA Cup | Round of 32 | (France) Bordeaux | 2–1 | 1–1 |
| 2007–08 | UEFA Cup | Round of 16 | (Germany) Bayern Munich | 0–5 | 2–1 |
| 2008–09 | Champions League | Second qualifying round | (Belarus) BATE Borisov | 1–2 | 2–2 |
| 2009–10 | Champions League | Third qualifying round | (Turkey) Sivasspor | 5–0 | 1–3 |
| 2009–10 | Champions League | Play-Offs | (France) Lyon | 1–3 | 1–5 |
| 2009–10 | Europa League | Group A | (Croatia) Dinamo Zagreb | 0–1 | 2–0 |
| 2009–10 | Europa League | Group A | (Netherlands) Ajax | 1–1 | 3–1 |
| 2009–10 | Europa League | Group A | (Romania) FC Timișoara | 3–1 | 0–0 |
| 2009–10 | Europa League | Round of 32 | (Spain) Athletic Bilbao | 4–0 | 1–1 |
| 2009–10 | Europa League | Round of 16 | (Germany) Hamburger SV | 4–3 | 1–3 |
| 2010–11 | Champions League | Third qualifying round | (Wales) The New Saints | 3–0 | 3–1 |
| 2010–11 | Champions League | Play-Offs | (Serbia) Partizan | 2–2 (2–3 p) | 2–2 |
| 2010–11 | Europa League | Group G | (Russia) Zenit Saint Petersburg | 1–3 | 1–3 |
| 2010–11 | Europa League | Group G | (Croatia) Hajduk Split | 2–0 | 0–1 |
| 2010–11 | Europa League | Group G | (Greece) AEK Athens | 3–0 | 1–1 |
| 2010–11 | Europa League | Round of 32 | (Netherlands) Ajax | 0–3 | 0–2 |
| 2011–12 | Europa League | Play-Offs | (Turkey) Bursaspor | 2–2 | 2–1 |
| 2011–12 | Europa League | Group L | (Greece) AEK Athens | 4–1 | 2–1 |
| 2011–12 | Europa League | Group L | (Russia) Lokomotiv Moscow | 5–3 | 2–0 |
| 2011–12 | Europa League | Group L | (Austria) Sturm Graz | 3–0 | 2–0 |
| 2011–12 | Europa League | Round of 32 | (Netherlands) AZ | 0–1 | 0–1 |
| 2012–13 | Champions League | Third qualifying round | (Lithuania) Ekranas | 5–0 | 6–0 |
| 2012–13 | Champions League | Play-Offs | (Cyprus) AEL Limassol | 2–0 | 1–2 |
| 2012–13 | Champions League | Group C | (Italy) Milan | 1–3 | 0–0 |
| 2012–13 | Champions League | Group C | (Spain) Málaga | 0–3 | 2–2 |
| 2012–13 | Champions League | Group C | (Russia) Zenit Saint Petersburg | 1–0 | 0–1 |
| 2013–14 | Champions League | Group C | (Portugal) Benfica | 2–3 | 0–2 |
| 2013–14 | Champions League | Group C | (Greece) Olympiacos | 0–3 | 1–3 |
| 2013–14 | Champions League | Group C | (France) Paris Saint-Germain | 0–5 | 1–1 |
| 2014–15 | Champions League | Group D | (Turkey) Galatasaray | 2–0 | 1–1 |
| 2014–15 | Champions League | Group D | (Germany) Borussia Dortmund | 0–3 | 1–1 |
| 2014–15 | Champions League | Group D | (England) Arsenal | 1–2 | 3–3 |
| 2014–15 | Europa League | Round of 32 | (Russia) Dynamo Moscow | 0–0 | 1–3 |
| 2015–16 | Europa League | Group J | (France) Monaco | 1–1 | 2–0 |
| 2015–16 | Europa League | Group J | (Azerbaijan) Qarabağ | 2–1 | 0–1 |
| 2015–16 | Europa League | Group J | (England) Tottenham Hotspur | 2–1 | 1–2 |
| 2015–16 | Europa League | Round of 32 | (Greece) Olympiacos | 1–0 | 2–1 (a.e.t.) |
| 2015–16 | Europa League | Round of 16 | (Ukraine) Shakhtar Donetsk | 0–1 | 1–3 |
| 2016–17 | Champions League | Third qualifying round | (Russia) Rostov | 0–2 | 2–2 |
| 2016–17 | Europa League | Play-Offs | (Czech Republic) Slavia Prague | 3–0 | 3–0 |
| 2016–17 | Europa League | Group C | (Azerbaijan) Gabala | 3–1 | 3–1 |
| 2016–17 | Europa League | Group C | (France) Saint-Étienne | 2–3 | 1–1 |
| 2016–17 | Europa League | Group C | (Germany) Mainz 05 | 6–1 | 1–1 |
| 2016–17 | Europa League | Round of 32 | (Russia) Zenit Saint Petersburg | 2–0 | 1–3 |
| 2016–17 | Europa League | Round of 16 | (Cyprus) APOEL | 1–0 | 1–0 |
| 2016–17 | Europa League | Quarter-final | (England) Manchester United | 1–1 | 1–2 (a.e.t.) |
| 2017–18 | Champions League | Group B | (Germany) Bayern Munich | 1–2 | 0–3 |
| 2017–18 | Champions League | Group B | (Scotland) Celtic | 0–3 | 1–0 |
| 2017–18 | Champions League | Group B | (France) Paris Saint-Germain | 0–4 | 0–5 |
| 2018–19 | Europa League | Group D | (Slovakia) Spartak Trnava | 0–0 | 0–1 |
| 2018–19 | Europa League | Group D | (Croatia) Dinamo Zagreb | 0–2 | 0–0 |
| 2018–19 | Europa League | Group D | (Turkey) Fenerbahçe | 2–2 | 0–2 |
| 2021–22 | Europa Conference League | Third qualifying round | (Albania) Laçi | 2–1 | 3–0 |
| 2021–22 | Europa Conference League | Play-Offs | (Netherlands) Vitesse | 3–3 | 1–2 |
| 2022–23 | Europa Conference League | Third qualifying round | (Estonia) Paide Linnameeskond | 3–0 | 2–0 |
| 2022–23 | Europa Conference League | Play-Offs | (Switzerland) Young Boys | 0–1 (3–1 p) | 1–0 |
| 2022–23 | Europa Conference League | Group B | (Denmark) Silkeborg | 1–0 | 2–0 |
| 2022–23 | Europa Conference League | Group B | (Romania) FCSB | 2–2 | 0–0 |
| 2022–23 | Europa Conference League | Group B | (England) West Ham United | 0–1 | 1–2 |
| 2022–23 | Europa Conference League | Knockout Round Play-Offs | (Bulgaria) Ludogorets Razgrad | 2–1 (3–0 p) | 0–1 |
| 2022–23 | Europa Conference League | Round of 16 | (Spain) Villarreal | 1–1 | 1–0 |
| 2022–23 | Europa Conference League | Quarter-final | (Netherlands) AZ | 2–0 | 0–2 (1–4 p) |
| 2024–25 | Europa League | Play-Offs | (Belarus) Dinamo Minsk | 1–0 | 1–0 |
| 2024–25 | Europa League | League phase | (Hungary) Ferencváros | 2–1 | N/A |
| 2024–25 | Europa League | League phase | (Spain) Real Sociedad | N/A | 2–1 |
| 2024–25 | Europa League | League phase | (Bulgaria) Ludogorets Razgrad | 2–0 | N/A |
| 2024–25 | Europa League | League phase | (Latvia) RFS | N/A | 1–1 |
| 2024–25 | Europa League | League phase | (Portugal) Porto | 2–2 | N/A |
| 2024–25 | Europa League | League phase | (Czech Republic) Slavia Prague | N/A | 2–1 |
| 2024–25 | Europa League | League phase | (Czech Republic) Viktoria Plzeň | N/A | 0–2 |
| 2024–25 | Europa League | League phase | (Germany) TSG Hoffenheim | 3–4 | N/A |
| 2024–25 | Europa League | Knockout Phase Play-Offs | (Turkey) Fenerbahçe | 2–2 | 0–3 |
| 2025–26 | Europa League | Second qualifying round | (Sweden) BK Häcken | 1–0 | 1–2 (2–4 p) |
| 2025–26 | Conference League | Third qualifying round | (Moldova) Sheriff Tiraspol | 3–0 | 1–1 |
| 2025–26 | Conference League | Play-Offs | (Greece) AEK Athens | 1–1 | 0–2 |
| 2026–27 | Europa League | Second qualifying round | (Sweden) Hammarby IF | 3–1 | 1–1 |
| 2026–27 | Europa League | Third qualifying round | (Greece) PAOK | 3–2 | 1–0 |
| 2026–27 | Europa League | Play-Offs | (Kazakhstan) Kairat | 3–0 | 3–0 |
| 2026–27 | Europa League | League phase | (France) Lyon | 1–2 | N/A |
| 2026–27 | Europa League | League phase | (Croatia) Dinamo Zagreb | N/A | |
| 2026–27 | Europa League | League phase | (Poland) Jagiellonia Białystok | N/A | |
| 2026–27 | Europa League | League phase | (Austria) Red Bull Salzburg | | N/A |
| 2026–27 | Europa League | League phase | (Greece) OFI | N/A | |
| 2026–27 | Europa League | League phase | (Germany) TSG Hoffenheim | | N/A |
| 2026–27 | Europa League | League phase | (England) Sunderland | | N/A |
| 2026–27 | Europa League | League phase | (France) Marseille | N/A | |

=== Summary of Anderlecht's best results in European competitions ===
From the quarter-finals upwards:

(5 cups) + (4 finals)

European Cup/UEFA Champions League:

- semi-finalists in 1982 and 1986
- quarter-finalists in 1963, 1966, 1975, 1987 and 1988
- group stage (last 8) in 1991–92*, 1993–94

UEFA Cup Winners' Cup (2) + (2):

- winners in 1976 and 1978
- finalists in 1977 and 1990

UEFA Cup/UEFA Europa League (1) + (2):

- winners in 1983
- finalists in 1984
- quarter-finalists in 1991, 1997, and 2017

Inter-Cities Fairs Cup:

- finalists in 1970

UEFA Europa Conference League:

- quarter-finalists in 2023

UEFA Super Cup (2):

- winners in 1976 and 1978

- *in the 1991–92 and 1992–93 seasons, there were no semi-finals after the group stage.

=== UEFA club coefficient ranking ===
As of 31 March 2026

| Rank | Country | Team | Points |
|---|---|---|---|
| 70 | (Sweden) | Djurgården | 32.000 |
| 71 | (Italy) | Bologna | 30.750 |
| 72 | (Belgium) | Anderlecht | 30.750 |
| 73 | (England) | Newcastle United | 29.750 |
| 74 | (Austria) | Rapid Wien | 29.750 |

== Records ==
- Most goals in European competition: Rob Rensenbrink, 33
- First European match: Vörös Lobogó 6–3 Anderlecht in the European Cup, 7 September 1955
- First goal scored in Europe: René Vanderwilt against Vörös Lobogó, 7 September 1955
- Biggest win: Anderlecht 10–1 Haka, in the European Cup, 14 September 1966
- Biggest defeat: Manchester United 10–0 Anderlecht in the European Cup, 26 September 1956
- Highest European home attendance:
