= 2003–04 RSC Anderlecht season =

R.S.C. Anderlecht
2003–04 season
- Manager: Hugo Broos
- Belgian First Division: 1st
- Belgian Cup: Semi-finals
- Champions League: Group stage
- Top goalscorer: Aruna Dindane (15)
| Home colours | Away colours |

During the 2003–04 season, R.S.C. Anderlecht participated in the Belgian First Division.

== Season summary ==
Anderlecht won the title for the first time in three seasons. They had held a big lead over their title rivals Club Brugge for some time, but a bad finish from Anderlecht kept the suspense until the 31st matchday, when Club Brugge drew with Mouscron while the team from Brussels also drew (1-1) at Lierse to confirm their title.

== First-team squad ==
Note: Flags indicate national team as defined under FIFA eligibility rules; some limited exceptions apply. Players may hold more than one non-FIFA nationality.

| No. | Pos. | Nation | Player |
|---|---|---|---|
| 1 | GK | CZE | Daniel Zítka |
| 3 | DF | BEL | Olivier Deschacht |
| 4 | MF | BEL | Yves Vanderhaeghe |
| 5 | DF | BEL | Glen De Boeck |
| 6 | DF | POL | Michał Żewłakow |
| 7 | MF | SCG | Goran Lovre (Note: Lovre was born in Zagreb, Yugoslavia (now Croatia), but also qualified to represent Serbia and Montenegro (now Serbia) internationally and represented them at U-19, U-21, and U-23 level.) |
| 8 | FW | SCG | Nenad Jestrović |
| 9 | FW | AUS | Clayton Zane |
| 10 | MF | BEL | Walter Baseggio (captain) |
| 11 | MF | CZE | Martin Kolář |
| 12 | DF | BEL | Olivier Doll |
| 14 | MF | BEL | Marc Hendrikx |
| 15 | DF | ALB | Besnik Hasi (Note: Hasi was born in Gjakova, Yugoslavia (now Kosovo), but also qualified to represent Albania internationally and made his international debut for Albania in 2000.) |
| 17 | MF | SWE | Christian Wilhelmsson |
| 18 | MF | KOR | Seol Ki-hyeon |

| No. | Pos. | Nation | Player |
|---|---|---|---|
| 19 | FW | CRO | Ivica Mornar |
| 21 | MF | SWE | Pär Zetterberg |
| 22 | FW | UKR | Oleg Yashchuk |
| 23 | MF | COD | Gabriel N'Galula |
| 24 | GK | BEL | Tristan Peersman |
| 25 | GK | BEL | Jan Van Steenberghe |
| 26 | FW | CIV | Aruna Dindane |
| 27 | DF | BEL | Vincent Kompany |
| 28 | MF | RUS | Anatoli Gerk |
| 30 | DF | FIN | Hannu Tihinen |
| 31 | MF | BEL | Mark De Man |
| 34 | DF | BFA | Lamine Traoré |
| 35 | FW | NED | Sherjill MacDonald |
| 37 | DF | BEL | Anthony Vanden Borre |

=== Left club during season ===
Note: Flags indicate national team as defined under FIFA eligibility rules; some limited exceptions apply. Players may hold more than one non-FIFA nationality.

| No. | Pos. | Nation | Player |
|---|---|---|---|
| 2 | DF | SCG | Aleksandar Ilić (to Vitesse) |

== Results ==
=== Belgian First Division ===
| Pos | Team | Pld | W | D | L | GF | GA | GD | Pts | Qualification or relegation |
|---|---|---|---|---|---|---|---|---|---|---|
| 1 | Anderlecht (C) | 34 | 25 | 6 | 3 | 77 | 27 | +50 | 81 | Qualification to Champions League third qualifying round |
| 2 | Club Brugge | 34 | 22 | 6 | 6 | 77 | 31 | +46 | 72 | Qualification to Champions League second qualifying round |
| 3 | Standard Liège | 34 | 18 | 11 | 5 | 68 | 31 | +37 | 65 | Qualification to UEFA Cup first round |
| 4 | Genk | 34 | 17 | 8 | 9 | 58 | 40 | +18 | 59 | Qualification to Intertoto Cup second round |
| 5 | Mouscron | 34 | 15 | 14 | 5 | 64 | 42 | +22 | 59 | |

(C) Champions

=== Champions League ===
==== Second qualifying round ====
| 30 July 2003 | Rapid București (Romania) | 0–0 | (Belgium) Anderlecht | Stadionul Național, Bucharest |
| 20:00 | | Report | | Referee: Anton Stredák (Slovakia) |

| 6 August 2003 | Anderlecht (Belgium) | 3–2 | (Romania) Rapid București | Constant Vanden Stock Stadium, Brussels |
| 20:30 | Jestrović 50'; Zetterberg 52'; Seol 75' | Report | Ilyés 42'; Bratu 45' | Referee: Emil Bozinovski (Macedonia) |

Anderlecht won 3–2 on aggregate.

==== Third qualifying round ====
| 13 August 2003 | Anderlecht (Belgium) | 3–1 | (Poland) Wisła Kraków | Constant Vanden Stock Stadium, Brussels |
| 20:30 | Jestrović 13'; Lovre 38'; Dindane 59' | Report | Żurawski 77' (pen.) | Referee: Arturo Daudén Ibáñez (Spain) |

| 26 August 2003 | Wisła Kraków (Poland) | 0–1 | (Belgium) Anderlecht | Stadion Miejski, Kraków |
| 21:00 | | Report | Dindane 85' | Referee: Konrad Plautz (Austria) |

Anderlecht won 4–1 on aggregate.

==== Group stage ====
| 17 September 2003 | Lyon (France) | 1–0 | (Belgium) Anderlecht | Stade de Gerland, Lyon |
| 20:45 | Juninho 25' (pen.) | Report | | Referee: Paulo Costa (Portugal) |

| 30 September 2003 | Anderlecht (Belgium) | 1–1 | (Germany) Bayern Munich | Constant Vanden Stock Stadium, Brussels |
| 20:45 | Mornar 52' | Report | Santa Cruz 73' | Referee: Luis Medina Cantalejo (Spain) |

| 21 October 2003 | Anderlecht (Belgium) | 1–0 | (Scotland) Celtic | Constant Vanden Stock Stadium, Brussels |
| 20:45 | Dindane 72' | Report | | Referee: Fritz Stuchlik (Austria) |

| 5 November 2003 | Celtic (Scotland) | 3–1 | (Belgium) Anderlecht | Celtic Park, Glasgow |
| 20:45 | Larsson 12'; Miller 17'; Sutton 29' | Report | Dindane 77' | Referee: Kyros Vassaras (Greece) |

| 25 November 2003 | Anderlecht (Belgium) | 1–0 | (France) Lyon | Constant Vanden Stock Stadium, Brussels |
| 20:45 | Tihinen 69' | Report | | Referee: Domenico Messina (Italy) |

| 10 December 2003 | Bayern Munich (Germany) | 1–0 | (Belgium) Anderlecht | Olympic Stadium, Munich |
| 20:45 | Makaay 42' (pen.) | Report | | Referee: Kim Milton Nielsen (Denmark) |
