= Jan Simoen =

Belgian association football player

Personal information
- Date of birth: 9 December 1953 (age 72)
- Place of birth: Nieuwpoort, Belgium
- Position: Forward

Senior career*
Years	Team	Apps	(Gls)
1970–1977	AS Oostende	189	(103)
1977–1979	Club Brugge	35	(17)
1979–1980	SK Beveren	11	(1)
1980–1981	Cercle Brugge	27	(11)
1981–1987	Sint-Niklase SK	97	(64)
1987–1990	VK Torhout	118	(76)
1990–1993	VV Kortemark		
- * Club domestic league appearances and goals

Jan Simoen (born 9 December 1953) is a Belgian former professional footballer who played as a forward.

== Honours ==
=== Player ===
AS Oostende

- Belgian Third Division: 1972–73 (promotion to Second Division as champion)
- Belgian Second Division: 1973–74 (promotion to First Division as runner-up)

Club Brugge

- Belgian First Division: 1977–78
- Belgian Cup: runner-up 1978–79
- European Champion Clubs' Cup: runner-up 1977–78
- Jules Pappaert Cup: 1978

Sint-Niklase S.K.

- Belgian Third Division: 1981–82 (promotion to Second Division as champion)
- Belgian Second Division: 1983–84 (promotion to First Division as champion)
