= 1931–32 in Belgian football =

Football in Belgium
- Season: 1931–32

The 1931–32 season was the 32nd season of competitive football in Belgium. The second and third level of Belgian football were just changed prior to the beginning of the season, with now 2 leagues of 14 clubs in Division I and 4 leagues of 14 clubs in Promotion. R Liersche SK won their first Premier Division title.

== Overview ==
At the end of the season, Tubantia FAC and FC Turnhout were relegated to the Division I, while Lyra TSV (Division I A winner) and RRC de Bruxelles (Division I B winner) were promoted to the Premier Division. The Promotion was won by SV Blankenberghe, Oude God Sport, Union Hutoise FC and Stade Waremmien. The four clubs were promoted to the Division I while Sint-Niklaassche SK, SK Roulers, RFC Bressoux and R Charleroi SC were relegated from the Division I to the Promotion.

== National team ==
Date	Venue	Opponents	Score*	Comp	Belgium scorers
October 11, 1931	Heysel Stadium, Brussels (H)	Poland	2-1	F	August Hellemans, Bernard Voorhoof
November 6, 1931	Heysel Stadium, Brussels (H)	Switzerland	2–1	F	Jean Capelle
March 20, 1932	Bosuilstadion, Antwerp (H)	The Netherlands	1-4	F	Désiré Bastin
April 17, 1932	Olympic Stadium, Amsterdam (A)	The Netherlands	1-2	F	Jean Capelle
May 1, 1932	Heysel Stadium, Brussels (H)	France	5-2	F	Jean Brichaut, Stanley Vanden Eynde (2), Jean Capelle, Joseph Van Beeck
June 5, 1932	Idraetspark, Copenhagen (A)	Denmark	4-3	F	Jean Capelle (3), Joseph Van Beeck
June 12, 1932	Stockholm (A)	Sweden	1–3	F	Stanley Vanden Eynde

* Belgium score given first

Key

- H = Home match
- A = Away match
- N = On neutral ground
- F = Friendly
- o.g. = own goal

== Honours ==
Competition	Winner
Premier Division	K Liersche SK
Division I	Lyra TSV and RRC de Bruxelles
Promotion	SV Blankenberghe, Oude God Sport, Union Hutoise FC and Stade Waremmien
