= 1935–36 in Belgian football =

Football in Belgium
- Season: 1935–36

The 1935–36 season was the 36th season of competitive football in Belgium. R Daring Club de Bruxelles won their 4th Premier Division title.

== Overview ==
At the end of the season, RCS Brugeois and R Berchem Sport were relegated to Division I, while FC Turnhout (Division I A winner) and ARA La Gantoise (Division I B winner) were promoted to the Premier Division.
ARA Termondoise, Patria FC Tongres, AS Herstal and RCS Verviétois were relegated from Division I to Promotion, to be replaced by R Union Hutoise FC, OC Charleroi, R Stade Louvain and SC Eendracht Aalst.

== National team ==
Date	Venue	Opponents	Score*	Comp	Belgium scorers
November 17, 1935	Heysel Stadium, Brussels (H)	Sweden	5-1	F	Jacques Van Caelenberghe, Jean Capelle (2), Hendrik Isemborghs (2)
February 16, 1936	Heysel Stadium, Brussels (H)	Poland	0-2	F
March 8, 1936	Stade Olympique de Colombes, Colombes (A)	France	0-3	F
March 29, 1936	Olympic Stadium, Amsterdam (A)	The Netherlands	0-8	F
May 3, 1936	Heysel Stadium, Brussels (H)	The Netherlands	1-1	F	Raymond Braine
May 9, 1936	Heysel Stadium, Brussels (H)	England	3-2	F	Hendrik Isemborghs (2), Jean Fievez
May 24, 1936	Rankhof, Basel (A)	Switzerland	1-1	F	Jean Capelle

* Belgium score given first

Key

- H = Home match
- A = Away match
- N = On neutral ground
- F = Friendly
- o.g. = own goal

== Honours ==
Competition	Winner
Premier Division	R Daring Club de Bruxelles
Division I	FC Turnhout and ARA La Gantoise
Promotion	R Union Hutoise FC, OC Charleroi, R Stade Louvain and SC Eendracht Aalst
