= 2004–05 RSC Anderlecht season =

R.S.C. Anderlecht
2004–05 season
- Manager: Hugo Broos (until 7 February); Franky Vercauteren (from 8 February)
- Stadium: Constant Vanden Stock Stadium
- First Division: 2nd
- Belgian Cup: Round of 16
- Champions League: Group stage
- Belgian Supercup: Runners-up
- Top goalscorer: Nenad Jestrović (18)
| Home colours | Away colours |

During the 2004–05 Belgian football season, Anderlecht competed in the Belgian First Division.

== Season summary ==
Anderlecht were unable to defend their title and finished three points behind champions Club Brugge in second. Despite this, the club still qualified for the Champions League.

The club had a poor run in the Champions League, losing all six of their games in the group stage.

== First-team squad ==
Squad at end of season

Note: Flags indicate national team as defined under FIFA eligibility rules; some limited exceptions apply. Players may hold more than one non-FIFA nationality.

| No. | Pos. | Nation | Player |
|---|---|---|---|
| 1 | GK | CZE | Daniel Zítka |
| 3 | DF | BEL | Olivier Deschacht |
| 4 | MF | BEL | Yves Vanderhaeghe |
| 6 | DF | POL | Michał Żewłakow |
| 7 | MF | SCG | Goran Lovre |
| 8 | FW | SCG | Nenad Jestrović |
| 9 | FW | BEL | Mbo Mpenza |
| 10 | MF | BEL | Walter Baseggio (captain) |
| 11 | MF | CZE | Martin Kolář |
| 15 | MF | ALB | Besnik Hasi |
| 16 | FW | AUS | Clayton Zane |
| 17 | MF | SWE | Christian Wilhelmsson |
| 18 | MF | BEL | Christophe Grégoire |

| No. | Pos. | Nation | Player |
|---|---|---|---|
| 20 | MF | SUI | Fabrice Ehret |
| 21 | MF | SWE | Pär Zetterberg (vice-captain) |
| 22 | FW | UKR | Oleg Yashchuk |
| 24 | GK | BEL | Tristan Peersman |
| 25 | GK | BEL | Jan Van Steenberghe |
| 26 | FW | CIV | Aruna Dindane |
| 27 | DF | BEL | Vincent Kompany |
| 28 | MF | RUS | Anatoli Gerk |
| 30 | DF | FIN | Hannu Tihinen |
| 31 | MF | BEL | Mark De Man |
| 34 | DF | BFA | Lamine Traoré |
| 36 | FW | BEL | Jonathan Legear |
| 37 | DF | BEL | Anthony Vanden Borre |

=== Left club during season ===
Note: Flags indicate national team as defined under FIFA eligibility rules; some limited exceptions apply. Players may hold more than one non-FIFA nationality.

| No. | Pos. | Nation | Player |
|---|---|---|---|
| 5 | DF | BEL | Glen De Boeck (retired) |
| 14 | MF | BEL | Marc Hendrikx (to Lokeren) |

| No. | Pos. | Nation | Player |
|---|---|---|---|
| 18 | FW | KOR | Seol Ki-Hyeon (to Wolverhampton Wanderers) |
| 23 | MF | COD | Gabriel N'Galula (to Mons) |

== Results ==
=== Belgian First Division ===
| Pos | Team | Pld | W | D | L | GF | GA | GD | Pts | Qualification or relegation |
|---|---|---|---|---|---|---|---|---|---|---|
| 1 | Club Brugge (C) | 34 | 24 | 7 | 3 | 83 | 25 | +58 | 79 | Qualification to Champions League third qualifying round |
| 2 | Anderlecht | 34 | 23 | 7 | 4 | 75 | 34 | +41 | 76 | Qualification to Champions League second qualifying round |
| 3 | Genk | 34 | 21 | 7 | 6 | 59 | 37 | +22 | 70 | Qualification to UEFA Cup second qualifying round |
| 4 | Standard Liège | 34 | 21 | 7 | 6 | 64 | 30 | +34 | 70 | |
| 5 | Charleroi | 34 | 19 | 7 | 8 | 47 | 34 | +13 | 64 | Qualification to Intertoto Cup second round |

(C) Champions

=== Champions League ===
==== Third qualifying round ====
| 10 August 2004 | Benfica (Portugal) | 1–0 | (Belgium) Anderlecht | Estádio da Luz, Lisbon |
| | Zahovič 13' | Report MatchCentre | | Referee: Peter Fröjdfeldt (Sweden) |

| 24 August 2004 | Anderlecht (Belgium) | 3–0 (3–1 agg.) | (Portugal) Benfica | Constant Vanden Stock Stadium, Brussels |
| | Dindane 34', 59'; Jestrović 73' (pen.) | Report MatchCentre | Argel (red card) 72' | Referee: Stefano Farina (Italy) |

==== Group stage ====
| 14 September 2004 | Valencia (Spain) | 2–0 | (Belgium) Anderlecht | Estadio Mestalla, Valencia |
| 20:45 | Vicente 16'; Baraja 45' | Report MatchCentre | | Attendance: 39,000; Referee: Bertrand Layec (France) |

| 29 September 2004 | Anderlecht (Belgium) | 1–3 | (Italy) Inter Milan | Constant Vanden Stock Stadium, Brussels |
| 20:45 | Baseggio 90+4' | Report MatchCentre | Martins 9'; Adriano 51'; Stanković 55' | Referee: Kyros Vassaras (Greece) |

| 20 October 2004 | Anderlecht (Belgium) | 1–2 | (Germany) Werder Bremen | Constant Vanden Stock Stadium, Brussels |
| 20:45 | Wilhelmsson 26' | Report MatchCentre | Klasnić 36', 59' | Referee: Claus Bo Larsen (Denmark) |

| 2 November 2004 | Werder Bremen (Germany) | 5–1 | (Belgium) Anderlecht | Weserstadion, Bremen |
| 20:45 | Klasnić 2', 16', 79'; Klose 33'; Jensen 90' | Report MatchCentre | Iachtchouk 30' | Attendance: 37,579; Referee: Massimo Busacca (Switzerland) |

| 24 November 2004 | Anderlecht (Belgium) | 1–2 | (Spain) Valencia | Constant Vanden Stock Stadium, Brussels |
| 20:45 | Wilhelmsson 24' | Report MatchCentre | Corradi 19'; Di Vaio 48' | Attendance: 25,866; Referee: Tom Henning Øvrebø (Norway) |

| 7 December 2004 | Inter Milan (Italy) | 3–0 | (Belgium) Anderlecht | San Siro, Milan |
| 20:45 | Cruz 33'; Martins 60', 63' | Report MatchCentre | | Attendance: 30,000; Referee: Mike Riley (England) |
