= 1976–77 in Belgian football =

Football in Belgium
- Season: 1976–77

The 1976–77 season was the 74th season of competitive football in Belgium. Club Brugge KV won their 4th Division I title and they also won the Belgian Cup against RSC Anderlechtois (4-3). RSC Anderlechtois reached the final of the 1976–77 European Cup Winners' Cup for the second consecutive season, while R White Daring Molenbeek reached the semifinals of the 1976–77 UEFA Cup. The Belgium national football team started their 1978 FIFA World Cup qualification campaign with two victories over Iceland and Northern Ireland and a defeat against the Netherlands. The Belgian Women's First Division was won by Standard Fémina de Liège for the 3rd time. The first Belgian Women's Cup was organised, and won by Astrio Begijnendijk against Standard Fémina de Liège (0-0 and 7-6 after penalty shootout).

== Overview ==
Belgium was drawn in Group 4 of the 1978 FIFA World Cup qualification with Iceland, Northern Ireland and the Netherlands. After two wins over Iceland and Northern Ireland, Belgium lost once again to the Netherlands. At the end of the season, the Netherlands were on top of the group with 5 points, ahead of Belgium (4 points), Iceland (2 points) and Northern Ireland (1 point).

At the end of the season, the bottom 2 teams in Division I (ASV Oostende KM and Yellow Red KV Mechelen) were relegated to the Division II. The Division II champion (K Boom FC) as well as the Belgian Second Division final round winner (RAA Louviéroise) were promoted to the Division I. The bottom 2 teams in Division II (KFC Turnhout and KAS Eupen) were relegated to Division III while both Division III winners (KSC Eendracht Aalst and KSC Hasselt) qualified for the Division II. The bottom 2 clubs of each Division III league (K Olse Merksem SC, K White Star Club Lauwe, K Wit-Ster Beverst and K Zonhoven VV) were relegated to the Promotion. The winner of each Promotion league was promoted to the Division III: KRC Harelbeke, K Wuustwezel FC, KFC Herentals and RA Marchiennoise des Sports.

== National team ==
Date	Venue	Opponents	Score	Comp	Belgium scorers
September 5, 1976	Laugardalsvollur, Reykjavík (A)	Iceland	1-0	WCQ	François Van der Elst
November 10, 1976	Stade de Sclessin, Liège (H)	Northern Ireland	2-0	WCQ	Roger Van Gool, Raoul Lambert
January 26, 1977	Stadio Olimpico, Rome (A)	Italy	1-2	F	Christian Piot
March 26, 1977	Bosuilstadion, Antwerp (H)	Netherlands	0-2	WCQ	

Key

- H = Home match
- A = Away match
- N = On neutral ground
- F = Friendly
- WCQ = World Cup qualification
- o.g. = own goal

== European competitions ==
Club Brugge KV beat Steaua Bucuresti of Romania in the first round of the 1976–77 European Champion Clubs' Cup (won 2-1 at home, drew 1-1 away).
In the second round, they surprisingly eliminated Real Madrid CF of Spain (drew 0-0 away, won 2-0 at home).
In the quarter-finals, they could not beat Borussia Mönchengladbach of West Germany and were thus eliminated (drew 2-2 away, lost 0-1 at home).

For the first time, Belgium had 2 clubs in the 1976-77 European Cup Winners' Cup, with RSC Anderlechtois qualified as the competition holder and K Lierse SK being qualified as Belgian Cup finalist (since the Cup winner, RSC Anderlechtois, was already qualified).
In the first round, RSC Anderlechtois beat Roda JC of the Netherlands (won 2-1 at home, 3-2 away), but K Lierse SK were eliminated by HNK Hajduk Split of Yugoslavia (won 1-0 at home, lost 0-3 away).
In the second round, Anderlecht overclassed Galatasaray SK of Turkey ( won 5-1 home and away).
In the quarter-finals, they eliminated Southampton FC (won 2-0 at home, lost 1-2 away) and then SSC Napoli of Italy in the semi-finals (lost 0-1 away, won 2-0 at home) to reach the final for the second consecutive season.
This time, RSC Anderlechtois lost the final 0-2 to Hamburger SV of West Germany.

R White Daring Molenbeek (3rd-placed in the championship) and KSC Lokeren (4th) qualified for the 1976–77 UEFA Cup.
In the first round, RWDM easily eliminated Næstved BK of Norway (won 3-0 away, 4-0 at home), while Lokeren beat FA Red Boys Differdange of Luxembourg (won 3-0 away, 3-1 at home).
In the second round, RWDM beat Wisla Krakow of Poland on penalty shootout (after two 1-1 draws), but Lokeren drew FC Barcelona and were eliminated (lost 0-2 away, won 2-1 at home).
RWDM then eliminated FC Schalke 04 of West Germany in the third round (won 1-0 at home, drew 1-1 away) and Feyenoord Rotterdam of the Netherlands in the quarter-finals (draw 0-0 away, won 2-1 at home) to reach the semifinals of the UEFA Cup.
At this stage, RWD Molenbeek lost on away goals to Athletic Bilbao (drew 1-1 at home, 0-0 away).

== Honours ==
Competition	Winner
Division I	Club Brugge KV
Cup	Club Brugge KV
Women Division I	Standard Fémina de Liège
Division II	K Boom FC
Division III	KSC Eendracht Aalst and KSC Hasselt
Promotion	KRC Harelbeke, K Wuustwezel FC, KFC Herentals and RA Marchiennoise des Sports

== Final league tables ==
=== Division I ===
- 1976-77 Top scorer: François Van der Elst (RSC Anderlechtois) with 21 goals
- 1976 Golden Shoe: Dutchman Rob Rensenbrink (RSC Anderlechtois)
