= Versyp =

Versyp is a surname. Notable people with the surname include:

- Louis Versyp (1908–1988), Belgian footballer and manager
- Sharon Versyp (born 1965), American basketball player and coach
