= List of winners of Belgian Second Division =

The Belgian Second Division winners are the winners of the second–highest league in Belgian football. The Second Division was established in 1905, as the Promotion. In 1923, the Promotion was played in two leagues of 14 clubs each. In 1926, when the Belgian First Division was renamed Premier Division, the Promotion became the First Division and was played in one league of 14 clubs. In 1931, the second level was split again into two leagues of 14 clubs. During and after World War II, the number of clubs in the First Division was not stable, and in 1947 it was stabilized to 16 clubs. In 1952, the First Division was renamed Second Division and was played in one league of 16 clubs. In 1973–74, a final round was introduced to decide the second club promoting to the First Division. In 1994, the number of clubs was increased to 18.

== Promotion (1905–1923) ==
Season	Winner	Runner–Up
1905–06	Union Saint–Gilloise (II)	SC Courtraisien
1906–07	Beerschot AC	Atheneum VV Stockel
1907–08	RC de Gand	ESC Forest
1908–09	Standard FC Liégeois	Daring Club de Bruxelles (II)
1909–10	RC de Malines	AA La Gantoise
1910–11	Uccle Sport	RC de Gand
1911–12	FC Liégeois	CS Verviétois
1912–13	AA La Gantoise	Leopold Club de Bruxelles
1913–14	Uccle Sport	RC Malines
1915–19	League suspended due to World War I	
1919–20	Tilleur FC	Standard CL
1920–21	Standard CL	FC Malinois
1921–22	Uccle Sport	Berchem Sport
1922–23	FC Liégeois	RC Gand

== Promotion A and Promotion B (1923–1926) ==
Season	Promotion A winner	Promotion B winner
1923–24	SC Anderlechtois	White Star AC
1924–25	R Tilleur FC	CS Verviétois
1925–26	RC de Bruxelles	FC Malinois

== First Division (1926–1931) ==
Season	Winner	Runner–up
1926–27	R Liersche SK	SC Anderlechtois
1927–28	FC Malinois	Tilleur FC
1928–29	FC Brugeois	SC Anderlechtois
1929–30	RC Montegnée	Tubantia FAC
1930–31	RRC Gand	FC Turnhout

== First Division A and First Division B (1931–1952) ==
Season	First Division A winner	First Division B winner
1931–32	TSV Lyra	RRC de Bruxelles
1932–33	Belgica FC Edegem	R Tilleur FC
1933–34	White Star AC	R Berchem Sport
1934–35	RFC Brugeois	RSC Anderlechtois
1935–36	FC Turnhout	ARA La Gantoise
1936–37	RC Tirlemont	OC Charleroi
1937–38	Boom FC	RCS Brugeois
1938–39	SC Eendracht Aalst	R Tilleur FC
1939–41	Leagues suspended due to World War II	
1941–42	CS La Forestoise	RC de Bruxelles
1942–43	K Lyra	R Berchem Sport
1943–44	K Sint-Niklaasche SK	FC Liégeois
1944–45	Leagues suspended due to World War II	
1945–46	RFC Brugeois	K Lyra
1946–47	R Uccle Sport	R Charleroi SC
1947–48	KRC Mechelen	R Tilleur FC
1948–49	K Stade Leuven	RFC Brugeois
1949–50	Daring Club de Bruxelles SR	R Beeringen FC
1950–51	R Union Saint-Gilloise	RUS Tournaisienne
1951–52	RRC de Gand	FC Beringen

== Second Division (1952–1973) ==
Season	Winner	Runner–up
1952–53	K Lyra	K Lierse SK
1953–54	KSV Waterschei Thor	RRC de Bruxelles
1954–55	R Daring Club de Bruxelles	K Beeringen FC
1955–56	RCS Verviétois	ROC Charleroi
1956–57	KSV Waterschei Thor	K Sint-Truidense VV
1957–58	K Beringen FC	RRC Tournaisien
1958–59	R Daring Club de Bruxelles	RFC Brugeois
1959–60	KSC Eendracht Aalst	Patro Eisden
1960–61	KFC Diest	RCS Brugeois
1961–62	R Berchem Sport	Beeringen FC
1962–63	RFC Malinois	K Waterschei SV Thor Genk
1963–64	R Union Saint-Gilloise	R Tilleur FC
1964–65	RR White	RFC Malinois
1965–66	KSV Waregem	R Charleroi SC
1966–67	SK Beveren	ROC Charleroi
1967–68	ARA La Gantoise	R Union Saint-Gilloise
1968–69	AS Oostende KM	R Crossing Club Molenbeek
1969–70	KFC Diest	R Antwerp FC
1970–71	KSV Cercle Brugge	KV Mechelen
1971–72	K Berchem Sport	R Beringen FC
1972–73	SK Beveren	SV Waregem

== Second division (1973–2016) ==
From 1973 to 2016, the second division winner and the play–off winner promote to the first division.

Season	Winner	Runner–up	Play–off winner
1973–74	ROC Montignies–sur–Sambre	AS Oostende	K Lierse SK
1974–75	KRC Mechelen	K Boom FC	AA La Louvière
1975–76	KFC Winterslag	KFC Diest	KV Kortrijk
1976–77	K Boom FC	Patro Eisden	AA Louviéroise
1977–78	KSV Waterschei Thor	K Berchem Sport	K Berchem Sport
1978–79	KSV Cercle Brugge	SK Tongeren	SC Hasselt
1979–80	KAA Gent	KV Kortrijk	KV Kortrijk
1980–81	KSK Tongeren	RFC Sérésien	KV Mechelen
1981–82	RFC Sérésien	K Beerschot VAV	K Beerschot VAV
1982–83	KV Mechelen	K Sint–Niklase SK	Beringen FC
1983–84	K Sint–Niklase SK	KSC Hasselt	RC Jet de Bruxelles
1984–85	R White Daring Molenbeek	KRC Mechelen	R Charleroi SC
1985–86	K Berchem Sport	RC Jet de Bruxelles	RC Jet de Bruxelles
1986–87	K Sint-Truidense VV	KFC Winterslag	KFC Winterslag
1987–88	KRC Mechelen	KSC Eendracht Aalst	K Lierse SK
1988–89	KFC Germinal Ekeren	RFC Sérésien	KAA Gent
1989–90	R White Daring Molenbeek	K Boom FC	KRC Genk
1990–91	KSK Beveren	K Sint–Niklase SK Excelsior	KSC Eendracht Aalst
1991–92	KFC Lommelse SK	KFC Turnhout	K Boom FC
1992–93	RFC Sérésien	K Beerschot VAC	KV Oostende
1993–94	K Sint-Truidense VV	RE Mouscron	KSC Eendracht Aalst
1994–95	KSV Waregem	K Beerschot VAC	KRC Harelbeke
1995–96	KSC Lokeren	KRC Genk	RE Mouscron
1996–97	KSK Beveren	KVC Westerlo	KVC Westerlo
1997–98	KV Oostende	KV Kortrijk	KV Kortrijk
1998–99	KV Mechelen	R Antwerp FC	KFC Verbroedering Geel
1999–2000	R Antwerp FC	KV Oostende	RAA Louviéroise
2000–01	KFC Lommelse SK	KFC Turnhout	R White Daring Molenbeek
2001–02	KV Mechelen	KSV Ingelmunster	R Albert Elizabeth Club Mons
2002–03	KSV Cercle Brugge	KAS Eupen	K Heusden-Zolder SK
2003–04	FC Molenbeek Brussels Strombeek	KV Oostende	KV Oostende
2004–05	SV Zulte-Waregem	KSV Roeselare	KSV Roeselare
2005–06	R Albert Elizabeth Club Mons	KVSK United Overpelt-Lommel	K Lierse SK
2006–07	FC Verbroedering Dender EH	KV Mechelen	KV Mechelen
2007–08	KV Kortrijk	AFC Tubize	AFC Tubize
2008–09	K Sint-Truidense VV	K Lierse SK	KSV Roeselare
2009–10	K Lierse SK	KVSK United Overpelt-Lommel	KAS Eupen
2010–11	OH Leuven	Lommel United	Mons
2011–12	Charleroi	Waasland-Beveren	Waasland-Beveren
2012–13	KV Oostende	Mouscron-Péruwelz	Cercle Brugge
2013–14	Westerlo	KAS Eupen	Mouscron-Péruwelz
2014–15	Sint-Truiden	Lommel United	OH Leuven
2015–16	WS Brussels	Eupen	No playoff

== Number of titles overall ==
- 6 wins: KV Mechelen
- 5 wins: R Tilleur FC, R Berchem Sport, R White Daring Molenbeek
- 4 wins: RFC Brugeois, Uccle Sport, K Lyra, KAA Gent, KRC Mechelen, KSK Beveren, Sint-Truiden
- 3 wins: R Beeringen FC, KSV Cercle Brugge, FC Liégeois, RC de Bruxelles, RRC Gand, R Daring Club de Bruxelles, KSV Waterschei Thor
- 2 wins: Standard FC Liégeois, SC Anderlechtois, R Union Saint-Gilloise, CS Verviétois, KSC Eendracht Aalst, KFC Diest, OC Charleroi, K Boom FC, K Sint-Niklase SK, RFC Sérésien, KSV Waregem, KFC Lommelse SK, K Lierse SK, KV Oostende
- 1 win: FC Turnhout, RC Montegnée, Beerschot AC, Union Saint-Gilloise II, Belgica FC Edegem, RC Tirlemont, CS La Forestoise, R Charleroi SC, K Stade Leuven, RUS Tournaisienne, AS Oostende KM, KFC Winterslag, KSK Tongeren, KFC Germinal Ekeren, KSC Lokeren, R Antwerp FC, FC Molenbeek Brussels Strombeek, SV Zulte-Waregem, R Albert Elizabeth Club Mons, FC Verbroedering Dender EH, KV Kortrijk, Oud-Heverlee Leuven, Westerlo
