= List of winners of Belgian Third Division =

The Belgian Third Division winners were winners of the third-highest level in Belgian football. The third division was established in 1926 with three leagues of 14 clubs each as the Promotion. In 1931, a fourth league was added. From 1948 on, a play-off is introduced to determine the Promotion champion. In 1952 the Belgian league system was changed and the Promotion became the Third Division with 2 leagues of 16 teams each. A play-off was introduced in 1993 in order to determine a third team to qualify for the second division. From 1998 on, the play-off to determine the third division champion was played no more. In 2016 the Third Division was rebranded and restructured to become Belgian First Amateur Division.

== Promotion A, Promotion B and Promotion C (1926-1931) ==
Year	Winner Promotion A	Winner Promotion B	Winner Promotion C
1926-27	Courtrai Sport	CS Tongrois	Fléron FC
1927-28	AS Renaisien	Vilvorde FC	Tubantia AC
1928-29	SK Roulers	R Charleroi SC	RC Montegnée
1929-30	CS Schaerbeek	FC Belgica Edegem	EFC Hasselt
1930-31	AS Ostende	Hoboken SK	RC Tirlemont

== Promotion A, Promotion B, Promotion C and Promotion D (1931-1952) ==
Year	Champion	Winner Promotion A	Winner Promotion B	Winner Promotion C	Winner Promotion D
1931-32		SV Blankenberghe	Oude God Sport	Union Hutoise FC	Stade Waremmien
1932-33		CS Saint-Josse	Cappellen FC	Wallonia Namur	Patria Tongres
1933-34		ARA Termonde	Oude God Sport	RC Montegnée	AS Herstal
1934-35		VG Ostende	FC Duffel	US Centre	Waterschei SV
1935-36		R Union Hutoise	OC Charleroi	R Stade Louvain	SC Eendracht Alost
1936-37		R Charleroi SC	FC Wilryck	R Vilvorde FC	AS Renaix
1937-38		CS Visétois	RE Hasselt	Racing Club de Bruxelles	AS Ostende
1938-39		R Fléron FC	RCS Hallois	RRC Tournai	Herenthals SK
1939-41	Leagues suspended due to World War II				
1941-42		Vigor Hamme	Verbroedering Geel	CS Andennais	Tongerse Club
1942-43		RFC Liégeois	Stade Nivellois	Sint-Niklaas SK	R Courtrai Sport
1943-44		RCS Hallois	RC Lokeren	UR Namur	Beringen FC
1944-45	Leagues suspended due to World War II				
1945-46		SC Meenen	Mol Sport	Cappellen FC	Stade Waremmien
1946-47		Winterslag FC	Gosselies Sport	FC Bressoux	SK Roeselare
1947-48	US Tournai	US Tournai	CS Verviers	US Centre	Sint-Truiden
1948-49	unknown	R Albert Elisabeth Club Mons	AS Ostende	AS Herstal	Union Hutoise
1949-50	Tubantia FC	FC Izegem	Dendermonde	Tubantia FC	Helzold
1950-51	RRC de Gand	Daring Leuven	RRC de Gand	Waterschei Thor	Rupel SK
1951-52	UR Namur	UR Namur	RC Tournai	Tubantia AC	Patria Tongeren

== Third division A and Third division B (1952-1998) ==
Year	Champion	Runner-up	Play-off winner
1952-53	R Uccle Sport	Tubantia FC	
1953-54	KFC Izegem	SRU Verviers	
1954-55	KFC Herentals	RRC Tournaisien	
1955-56	RCS Brugeois	Patro Eisden	
1956-57	KFC Diest	KSC Eendracht Aalst	
1957-58	RFC Sérésien	RFC Renaisien	
1958-59	KOLSE Merksem SC	RRC de Bruxelles	
1959-60	KFC Turnhout^{1}	UR Namur^{1}	
1960-61	KFC Herentals	AS Oostende KM	
1961-62	KRC Mechelen	R Crossing Club Molenbeek	
1962-63	K Boom FC	KSV Waregem	
1963-64	K Sint-Niklaasse SK	K Waterschei Thor Genk	
1964-65	K Willebroekse SV	RFC Sérésien	
1965-66	KRC Mechelen	SK Beveren-Waas	
1966-67	RRC Tournaisien	RRC Tirlemont	
1967-68	FC Turnhout^{2}	CS Brugeois^{2}	
1968-69	KRC Mechelen	KSV Sottegem	
1969-70	RAA Louviéroise	AS Eupen	
1970-71	KSK Tongeren	K Boom FC	
1971-72	KFC Winterslag	KSC Lokeren	
1972-73	AS Oostende KM^{3}	KOLSE Merksem SC^{3}	
1973-74	K Waterschei SV Thor Genk^{4}	KVG Oostende^{4}	
1974-75	VV Patro Eisden	KAA Gent	
1975-76	KAS Eupen	RU Saint-Gilloise	
1976-77	KSC Hasselt	KSC Eendracht Aalst	
1977-78	KRC Harelbeke	VC Rotselaar	
1978-79	R Jet de Bruxelles^{2}	Hoeselt VV^{2}	
1979-80	FC Sérésien	SV Oudenaarde	
1980-81	KFC Witgoor Sport Dessel	Stade Leuven	
1981-82	K. Sint-Niklase S.K.	VV Overpelt Fabriek	
1982-83	R Jet de Bruxelles	K Wuustwezel FC	
1983-84	VV Patro Eisden	RU Saint-Gilloise	
1984-85	AEC Mons^{2}	Verbroedering Geel^{2}	
1985-86	FC Assent	RC Harelbeke	
1986-87	KFC Lommel SK	KFC Eeklo	
1987-88	KFC Germinal Ekeren	K Stade Leuven	
1988-89	K Sint-Niklase SK	FC Zwarte Leeuw	
1989-90	KRC Harelbeke	FC Turnhout	
1990-91	RE Mouscron	RFC Sérésien	
1991-92	K Beerschot VAV	KV Oostende	
1992-93	KMSK Deinze	VC Westerlo	
1993-94	RAA Louviéroise	Patro Eiden	KVV Overpelt Fabriek
1994-95	R Cappellen FC	KFC Tielen	KFC Turnhout
1995-96	R Tilleur FC Liégeois^{5}	ROC Charleroi^{5}	FC Denderleeuw^{5}
1996-97	KFC Dessel Sport	KFC Vigor Wuitens Hamme	K Sint-Niklase SKE
1997-98	KFC Herentals	KSK Roeselare	RCS Visétois

— The result of the final game is unknown (the team shown under champion is the winner of the third division A and the team shown under runner-up is the winner of the third division B).
— No final game was played (the team shown under champion is the winner of the third division A and the team shown under runner-up is the winner of the third division B).
— Following the fusion between R Daring Club Molenbeek (second division) and R Racing White (first division), KV Kortrijk (second-placed team of the third division B) had promoted to the second division after a play-off game against Waterschei SV Thor Genka (second-placed team of the third division A).
— Following the increase from 16 to 20 clubs in the first division, 3 extra clubs were promoted to the second division: R Tilleur FC (2nd in the third division A), RAEC Mons (2nd in the third division B) and AA La Louvière (3rd in the third division B).
— Following the merger between Standard Liège and RFC Sérésien (both playing in the first division), RU Saint-Gilloise (2nd in the third division A and play-off finalist) also promoted.

== Third division A and Third division B (1998-2016) ==
Year	Third division A winner	Third division B winner	Play-off winner
1998-99	KSV Ingelmunster	KVK Tienen	KMSK Deinze (2nd division)
1999-2000	KFC Strombeek	R Albert Elisabeth Club Mons	K Heusden-Zolder SK
2000-01	KSK Ronse	RESC Virton	KV Kortrijk^{6}
2001-02	SV Zulte-Waregem	KAS Eupen	KFC Vigor Wuitens Hamme
2002-03	K Berchem Sport	AFC Tubize	VC Eendracht Aalst 2002
2003-04	KV Red Star Waasland	RU Saint-Gilloise	KV Kortrijk
2004-05	Yellow-Red KV Mechelen	KVSK United Overpelt-Lommel	Oud-Heverlee Leuven
2005-06	FC Verbroedering Dender EH	KVK Tienen	K Racing Waregem
2006-07	RFC Tournai	ROC de Charleroi-Marchienne	KFC Verbroedering Geel
2007-08	KSK Ronse	RFC de Liège	VC Eendracht Aalst 2002
2008-09	K Standaard Wetteren	KFC Turnhout	R Boussu Dour Borinage
2009-10	KSK Heist	CS Visé	K Rupel Boom FC
2010-11	Eendracht Aalst	WS Woluwe	Sint-Niklaas
2011-12	Dessel Sport	Mouscron Péruwelz	Oudenaarde
2012-13	Hoogstraten	Virton	Geel-Meerhout
2013-14	KRC Mechelen	Woluwe-Zaventem	Patro Eisden Maasmechelen
2014-15	KVV Coxyde	Cappellen	Play-off not contested
2015-16	VW Hamme	Beerschot Wilrijk	Play-off abolished

— Due to financial problems, KV Kortrijk did not promote, allowing play-off finalist RCS Visétois to be promoted instead.
