= 2000–01 RSC Anderlecht season =

RSC Anderlecht
2000–01 season
- Manager: Aimé Anthuenis
- Stadium: Constant Vanden Stock Stadium
- First Division: 1st
- Belgian Cup: Quarter-finals
- Champions League: Second group stage
- Belgian Supercup: Winners
- Belgian League Cup: ?
- Top goalscorer: Tomasz Radzinski (23)
Home colours	Away colours

During the 2000–01 Belgian football season, RSC Anderlecht competed in the Belgian First Division.

== Season summary ==
Anderlecht won the Belgian title.

== First-team squad ==
Note: Flags indicate national team as defined under FIFA eligibility rules; some limited exceptions apply. Players may hold more than one non-FIFA nationality.

No.	Pos.	Nation	Player
—	GK	BEL	Filip De Wilde
—	GK	YUG	Zvonko Milojević
—	DF	BEL	Bertrand Crasson
—	DF	BEL	Glen De Boeck
—	DF	BEL	Didier Dheedene
—	DF	BEL	Olivier Doll
—	DF	BEL	Davy Oyen
—	DF	BEL	Emmanuel Pirard
—	DF	BEL	Lorenzo Staelens
—	DF	YUG	Aleksandar Ilić
—	DF	BFA	Lamine Traoré
—	MF	BEL	Walter Baseggio

No.	Pos.	Nation	Player
—	MF	BEL	Bart Goor
—	MF	BEL	Yves Vanderhaeghe
—	MF	NED	Patrick van Diemen
—	MF	SWE	Pär Zetterberg
—	MF	ROU	Alin Stoica
—	MF	ALB	Besnik Hasi
—	FW	CZE	Jan Koller
—	FW	UKR	Oleg Iachtchouk
—	FW	CIV	Aruna Dindane
—	FW	GUI	Souleymane Youla
—	FW	CAN	Tomasz Radzinski

== Reserve squad ==
Note: Flags indicate national team as defined under FIFA eligibility rules; some limited exceptions apply. Players may hold more than one non-FIFA nationality.

No.	Pos.	Nation	Player
—	FW	TUR	Yasin Karaca

== League table ==
Pos	Team	Pld	W	D	L	GF	GA	GD	Pts	Qualification or relegation
1	Anderlecht (C)	34	25	8	1	88	25	+63	83	Qualification to Champions League second qualifying round
2	Club Brugge	34	23	9	2	83	24	+59	78	Qualification to UEFA Cup qualifying round
3	Standard Liège	34	16	12	6	71	44	+27	60	Qualification to UEFA Cup qualifying round
4	Sporting Lokeren	34	16	9	9	58	41	+17	57	Qualification to Intertoto Cup first round
5	Gent	34	16	9	9	61	49	+12	57	Qualification to Intertoto Cup second round

(C) Champions
