= Olivier Doll =

Belgian footballer

Personal information
- Date of birth: 9 June 1973 (age 53)
- Place of birth: Brussels, Belgium
- Height: 1.81 m (5 ft 11 in)
- Position: Defender

Senior career*
Years	Team	Apps	(Gls)
1989–1994	Sérésien	83	(0)
1994–2004	Anderlecht	181	(6)
2004–2010	Lokeren	139	(2)
Total		403	(8)

International career
1997–2004	Belgium	6	(0)
- * Club domestic league appearances and goals

Olivier Doll (born 9 June 1973) is a Belgian retired footballer who played as a defender. He played much of his career at Anderlecht, where he failed to become a regular in the first team therefore trying his luck at Lokeren in the summer of 2004. Since that move, he has played four matches with the Belgium national team (he had already played one match with it in 1997 for the 1998 World Cup qualifying round against Turkey, when he replaced Rudi Smidts after one hour).

== Honours ==
R.F.C. Seraing

- Belgian Third Division: 1990–91
- Belgian Second Division: 1992–93

Anderlecht

- Belgian First Division: 1994–95, 1999–2000, 2000–01, 2003–04
- Belgian Cup: runner-up 1996–97
- Belgian Super Cup: 1995, 2000, 2001
- Belgian League Cup: 2000
- Belgian Sports Team of the Year: 2000

Individual

- Belgian Young Professional Footballer of the Year: 1993–94
