= 1943–44 in Belgian football =

Football in Belgium
- Season: 1943–44

The 1943–44 season was the 42nd season of competitive football in Belgium. R Antwerp FC won their 3rd Premier Division title. The Belgium national football team did not play any official match during the season.

== Overview ==
At the end of the season, TSV Lyra and R Tilleur FC were relegated to Division I, while Sint-Niklaas SK (Division I A winner) and RFC Liégeois (Division I B winner) were promoted to the Premier Division. However, due to the latter stages of World War II, 4 clubs did not take part to the next Premier Division season: R Antwerp FC, R Beerschot AC, K Liersche SK and R Berchem Sport.

ASV Oostende KM, K Tubantia FC, R Uccle Sport and R Fléron FC were relegated from Division I to Promotion, to be replaced by RCS Hallois, RC Lokeren, UR Namur and Beringen FC.

== Honours ==
| Competition | Winner |
|---|---|
| Premier Division | R Antwerp FC |
| Division I | Sint-Niklaas SK and RFC Liégeois |
| Promotion | RCS Hallois, RC Lokeren, UR Namur and Beringen FC |
