= 1942–43 in Belgian football =

Football in Belgium
- Season: 1942–43

The 1942–43 season was the 41st season of competitive football in Belgium. RFC Malinois won their first Premier Division title. The Belgium national football team did not play any official match during the season.

== Overview ==
At the end of the season, RRC de Bruxelles and K Boom FC were relegated to Division I, while TSV Lyra (Division I A winner) and R Berchem Sport (Division I B winner) were promoted to the Premier Division.
CS Andennais, Union Hutoise FC, RCS Hallois and K Belgica FC Edegem were relegated from Division I to Promotion, to be replaced by RFC Liégeois, Stade Nivellois, Sint-Niklaas SK and R Courtrai Sports.

== Honours ==
Competition	Winner
Premier Division	RFC Malinois
Division I	TSV Lyra and R Berchem Sport
Promotion	RFC Liégeois, Stade Nivellois, Sint-Niklaas SK and R Courtrai Sports
