= Joseph Desmedt =

Belgian footballer

Personal information
- Full name: Jean Desmedt
- Date of birth: 30 April 1912
- Place of birth: Uccle, Belgium
- Date of death: 17 January 1980 (aged 67)
- Position: Forward

Senior career*
Years	Team	Apps	(Gls)
1928–1936	Uccle Sport		
1936–1942	Union Saint-Gilloise		

International career
1933	Belgium	4	(2)
- * Club domestic league appearances and goals

Joseph Desmedt (30 April 1912 – 17 January 1980) was a Belgian footballer. He played in four matches for the Belgium national football team in 1933.
