= Robert Lamoot =

Belgian footballer (1911–1996)

- Lamoot with Belgium

Personal information
- Full name: Robertus Julianus Lamoot
- Date of birth: 18 March 1911
- Place of birth: Ostend, Belgium
- Date of death: 15 June 1996 (aged 85)
- Height: 1.77 m (5 ft 10 in)
- Position: Forward

Senior career*
| Years | Team | Apps | (Gls) |
| 1933–1938 | Daring Club Bruxelles | | |
| 1938–1946 | Royal Olympic de Charleroi | | |

International career
| 1933–1939 | Belgium | 7 | (2) |
- * Club domestic league appearances and goals

Robertus Julianus Lamoot (18 March 1911 – 15 June 1996) was a Belgian footballer who played as a forward for Daring Club de Bruxelles and then Royal Olympic de Charleroi in the 1930s.

He was a member of the Belgium national team. He scored the only goal on his debut, on 22 October 1933, a heavy defeat in Duisbourg, against Germany (8–1). He played seven times for Diables Rouges, with the last match in 1939.

== Honours ==
DC Bruxelles

- Belgian First Division: 1936, 1937; runner-up 1934, 1938
- Belgian Cup: 1935
