= 1962–63 in Belgian football =

Football in Belgium
- Season: 1962–63

The 1962–63 season was the 60th season of competitive football in Belgium. Standard Liège won their 3rd Division I title. RSC Anderlechtois entered the 1962–63 European Champion Clubs' Cup as Belgian title holder and reached the quarter finals, beating Real Madrid in the preliminary round. RU Saint-Gilloise entered the 1962–63 Inter-Cities Fairs Cup. The Belgium national football team started their first UEFA European Football Championship qualification campaign but were eliminated in the preliminary round by Yugoslavia.

== Overview ==
At the end of the season, RU Saint-Gilloise and OC Charleroi were relegated to Division II and were replaced in Division I by RFC Malinois and K Waterschei SV Thor Genk from Division II.
The bottom 2 clubs in Division II (UR Namur and K Olse Merksem SC) were relegated to Division III, to be replaced by KSV Waregem and K Boom FC from Division III.
The bottom club of each Division III league (RAA Louviéroise, RCS Brainois, R Jeunesse Arlonaise and K Tubantia FC) were relegated to Promotion, to be replaced by Voorwaarts Tienen, SK Beveren-Waas, CS Mechelen-aan-de-Maas and Stade Mouscron from Promotion.

== National team ==
Date	Venue	Opponents	Score*	Comp	Belgium scorers
October 14, 1962	Bosuilstadion, Antwerp (H)	The Netherlands	2-0	F	Jacques Stockman, Paul Van Himst
November 4, 1962	Stadion JNA, Belgrade (A)	Yugoslavia	2-3	ECQ	Jacques Stockman, Armand Jurion
December 2, 1962	Heysel Stadium, Brussels (H)	Spain	1-1	F	Armand Jurion
March 3, 1963	Feijenoord Stadion, Rotterdam (A)	The Netherlands	1-0	F	Paul Vandenberg
March 31, 1963	Heysel Stadium, Brussels (H)	Yugoslavia	0-1	ECQ
April 24, 1963	Heysel Stadium, Brussels (H)	Brazil	5-1	F	Jacques Stockman (3), Alpsteg (o.g.), Paul Van Himst

* Belgium score given first

Key

- H = Home match
- A = Away match
- N = On neutral ground
- F = Friendly
- ECQ = European Championship qualification
- o.g. = own goal

== European competitions ==
RSC Anderlechtois qualified for the first round of the 1962–63 European Champion Clubs' Cup by defeating 5 times winner Real Madrid of Spain in the preliminary round (drew 3-3 away, won 1-0 at home). In the first round proper, Anderlecht eliminated CSKA Red Star of Bulgaria (drew 2-2 away, won 2-0 at home) but lost in the quarter finals to the Scottish team of Dundee FC (lost 1-4 at home, 1-2 away).

RU Saint-Gilloise reached the second round of the 1962–63 Inter-Cities Fairs Cup by eliminating Olympique de Marseille of France (lost 0-1 away, won 4-2 at home). They then could not eliminate NK Dinamo (lost 1-2 away, won 1-0 at home and then lost 2-3 in a play-off match).

== Honours ==
Competition	Winner
Division I	Standard Liège
Division II	RFC Malinois
Division III	KSV Waregem and K Boom FC
Promotion	Voorwaarts Tienen, SK Beveren-Waas, CS Mechelen-aan-de-Maas and Stade Mouscron

== Final league tables ==
=== Premier Division ===
- 1962-63 Top scorer: Victor Wégria (RFC Liégeois) with 24 goals.
- 1962 Golden Shoe: Armand Jurion (RSC Anderlechtois)
