= Jacques Van Caelenberghe =

Belgian footballer (1910–1986)

Personal information
- Date of birth: 2 October 1910
- Place of birth: Belgium
- Date of death: 16 October 1986 (aged 76)

International career
| Years | Team | Apps | (Gls) |
| 1935–1936 | Belgium | 4 | (1) |

Jacques Van Caelenberghe (2 October 1910 – 16 October 1986) was a Belgian footballer. He played in four matches for the Belgium national football team from 1935 to 1936.
