= Hendrik Isemborghs =

Belgian footballer

Rik Isemborghs
Personal information
- Full name: Hendrik Victor Isemborghs
- Date of birth: 30 January 1914
- Place of birth: Antwerp
- Date of death: 9 March 1973 (aged 59)
- Position: Forward

International career
Years	Team	Apps	(Gls)
- Belgium

Hendrik Victor "Rik" Isemborghs (30 January 1914 in Antwerp – 9 March 1973) was a Belgian footballer. He played for Royal Beerschot AC and the Belgium national football team. He appeared in the 1938 FIFA World Cup and scored a goal in Belgium's only game.
