= August Hellemans =

Belgian footballer

Auguste Hendrik Hellemans
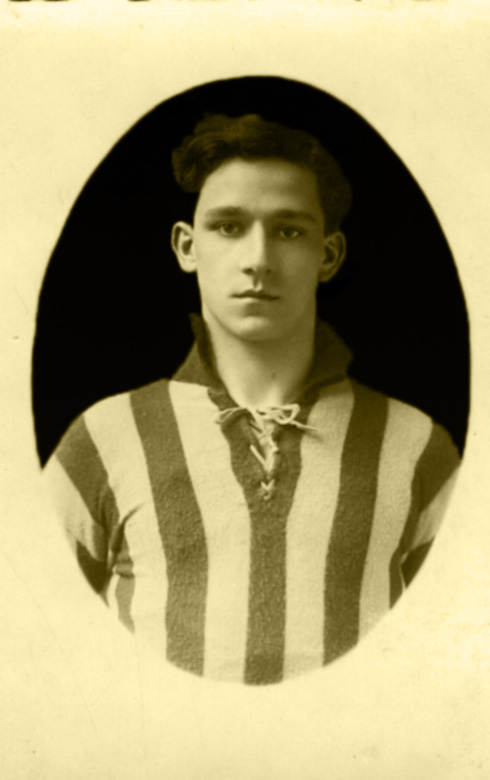

Personal information
- Date of birth: 21 June 1907
- Place of birth: Kapelle-op-den-Bos, Belgium
- Date of death: 4 May 1992 (aged 84)
- Place of death: Berchem-Sainte-Agathe, Belgium
- Height: 1.79 m (5 ft 10 in)
- Position: Midfielder

Senior career*
Years	Team	Apps	(Gls)
1926–1938	KV Mechelen		
1938–1947	RAA Louviéroise		

International career
1928–1934	Belgium	28	

Managerial career
- 1950–1952: K. Patro Eisden Maasmechelen
- 1956–1958: K. Patro Eisden Maasmechelen
- Dec. 1960–1961: K. Patro Eisden Maasmechelen
- * Club domestic league appearances and goals

Auguste "Gust" Hellemans (21 June 1907 in Kapelle-op-den-Bos, Belgium – 4 May 1992 in Berchem-Sainte-Agathe, Belgium), was a Belgian footballer.

== Biography ==
He played as a midfielder for KV Mechelen and Belgium. He was part of Belgium's team at the 1928 Summer Olympics, but he did not play in any matches. He also played in the World Cups of 1930 in Uruguay and 1934 in Italy. He finished his career in 1947, at RAA Louviéroise. After the war, he coached for a number of seasons at K. Patro Eisden Maasmechelen.

== Honours ==
- International from 1928 to 1934 (28 caps)
- Participation at the Olympic Games in 1928 (1 match)
- Participation at the World Cups of 1930 (2 matches) and 1934 (1 match)
- Belgian D2 Champions in 1928 with KV Mechelen
- Top goalscorer in Belgian D2 in 1933
