= Tristan Peersman =

Belgian footballer (born 1979)

Personal information
- Full name: Tristan Peersman
- Date of birth: 28 September 1979 (age 47)
- Place of birth: Antwerp, Belgium
- Height: 1.90 m (6 ft 3 in)
- Position: Goalkeeper

Youth career
- 1987–1990: Hemiksem
- 1990–1991: Rupel Boom
- 1991–1996: Beveren

Senior career*
Years	Team	Apps	(Gls)
1996–2000	Beveren	15	(0)
2000–2005	Anderlecht	23	(0)
2006–2007	Willem II	16	(0)
2007–2008	OFI	6	(0)
2008–2009	Dordrecht	13	(0)
2009–2010	Mons	25	(0)
2012–2013	Herk-de-Stad FC		
2013–2014	KSV Temse		

International career
2004	Belgium	4	(0)
- * Club domestic league appearances and goals

Tristan Peersman (born 28 September 1979 in Antwerp) is a Belgian footballer. He is a goalkeeper who is currently unattached. He formerly played for various clubs, including Anderlecht and Willem II. He was transferred to OFI on 25 June 2007 but left the club the next year.

Since then, he has played for FC Dordrecht and R.A.E.C. Mons.

== Personal life ==
Peersman's son Kjell Peersman is also a professional footballer.
