= Jean Fievez =

Belgian footballer

Personal information
- Date of birth: 30 November 1910
- Place of birth: Brussels (Belgium)
- Date of death: 18 March 1997 (aged 86)
- Position: Striker

Senior career*
Years	Team	Apps	(Gls)
?–1936	RCS La Forestoise		
1936–1943	White Star de Bruxelles		
1946–1947	RAEC Mons		

International career
1936–1939	Belgium	9	(4)
- * Club domestic league appearances and goals

Jean Fievez (born 30 November 1910 – 18 March 1997) was a Belgian footballer. He was born in Brussels.

== Early career ==
He started his career at RCS La Forestoise before joining White Star de Bruxelles in 1936. playing as a striker, he played nine times, and scored four goals for Belgium. From 1946–1947, he played for RAEC Mons who then played in Division 3.

== Honours ==
- Belgian international from 1936 to 1939 (9 caps and 4 goals)
- First international match: 3 May 1936, Belgium-Netherlands, 1–1 (friendly)
- Picked for the 1938 World Cup (did not play)
