= Désiré Bastin =

Belgian footballer (1900–1971)

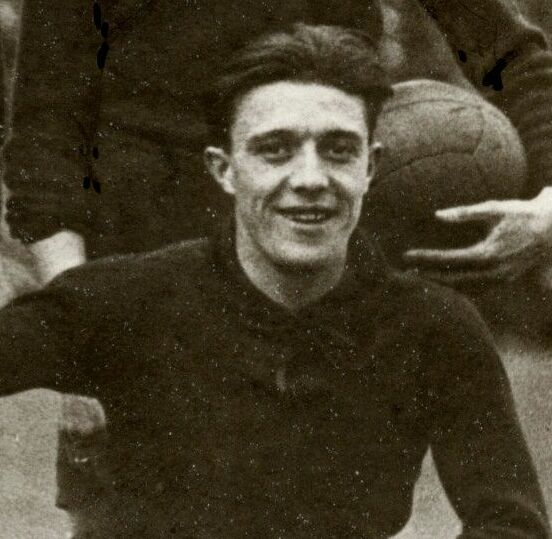
- Born: 4 March 1900; Antwerp
- Died: 18 April 1971 (aged 71)
- Occupation: footballer
- Known for: Belgium 1920 Olympic team

Olympic medal record

Men's Football
| Gold medal – first place | 1920 Antwerp | Team competition |

Désiré Bastin (4 March 1900 – 18 April 1971) was a Belgian association football player who competed in the 1920 Summer Olympics. He was a member of the Belgian team, which won the gold medal in the football tournament.
