= Ferdinand Adams =

Belgian footballer (1903–1985)

Personal information
- Full name: Ferdinand Eloy Adams
- Date of birth: 3 May 1903
- Place of birth: Berchem, Belgium
- Date of death: 25 December 1985 (aged 82)
- Place of death: Anderlecht, Belgium
- Position: Striker

Youth career
- 1918–1921: Anderlecht

Senior career*
Years	Team	Apps	(Gls)
1921–1933	Anderlecht	?	(?)

International career
1924–1930	Belgium	23	(9)
- * Club domestic league appearances and goals

Ferdinand Eloy Adams (3 May 1903 – 25 December 1985) was a Belgian international footballer who played as a striker for Anderlecht. Adams scored 9 goals in 23 appearances for the Belgian national side, and he played at the 1930 FIFA World Cup.
