= Koninklijk =

Honorary title for companies and non-profit organisations in Belgium and the Netherlands

Koninklijk (pronounced [ˈkoːnɪŋklək], Dutch for 'royal') (Note: Also sometimes rendered in its inflected form Koninklijke (pronounced [ˈkoːnɪŋkləkə]) in English writing.) is an honorary title given to certain companies and non-profit organisations in the Netherlands and to a lesser extent Belgium, by the monarchs of each country. It was first introduced by Louis Bonaparte in 1807, then King of Holland, who awarded the title to cultural associations. Companies awarded with the title may opt to use the English equivalent royal instead. It is comparable with the Royal Warrant in the United Kingdom.

The word is also used in the names of some state-controlled organisations, such as service branches of the Netherlands Armed Forces (e.g. Koninklijke Marine).

== In the Netherlands ==
The monarch of the Netherlands has the right to appoint the royal title to a company or organisation.

To qualify for a nomination, the company or organization has to meet the following conditions:

- it has to be leading in its field of expertise;
- it has to have national importance;
- it has to be in existence for at least 100 years (in principle).

As a rule, the monarch will award only one royal title per branch of business. Medical and financial corporations are excluded, as are organizations with political or religious goals.

== In Belgium ==
The King of the Belgians can appoint the title to a company or association that has been in existence in Belgium for at least fifty years, although rare exceptions are made for newer recipients considered of great importance for society.

== See also ==
- Royal charter
- List of companies with the title Koninklijk in Belgium (Dutch Wikipedia)
- List of companies with the title Koninklijk in the Netherlands (Dutch Wikipedia)
