= Lamine Traoré (footballer, born 1982) =

Burkina Faso footballer

Personal information
- Full name: Lamine Traoré
- Date of birth: 10 June 1982 (age 44)
- Place of birth: Zainalé, Upper Volta
- Position: Centre-back

Youth career
- 1992–1999: Planète Champion
- 1999–2001: Anderlecht

Senior career*
| Years | Team | Apps | (Gls) |
| 2001–2006 | Anderlecht | 40 | (2) |
| 2006–2009 | Gençlerbirligi | 27 | (1) |
| Total | | 67 | (3) |

International career
| 2001–2005 | Burkina Faso | 29 | (3) |
- * Club domestic league appearances and goals

Lamine Traoré (born 10 June 1982) is a Burkinabé former professional footballer who played as a centre-back for Anderlecht and Gençlerbirligi.

He was part of the Burkina Faso national team at the 2004 African Nations Cup, which finished bottom of its group in the first round of competition, thus failing to secure qualification for the quarter-finals.
