= Jean Brichaut =

Belgian footballer

Personal information
- Full name: Jean Joseph Emile Brichaut
- Date of birth: 29 July 1911
- Date of death: 14 May 1962 (aged 50)
- Position: Striker

Senior career*
Years	Team	Apps	(Gls)
1929–1936	Standard de Liège		

International career
1932–1936	Belgium	12	(3)
- * Club domestic league appearances and goals

Jean Brichaut (born 29 July 1911, Belgium; died 14 May 1962) was a Belgian footballer.

== Biography ==
Starting in 1929, Brichaut played as a striker for Standard de Liège. He scored 103 goals in 163 matches. He finished second in the Belgian First Division in 1936.

Brichaut also played 12 matches and scored 3 goals for the Diables Rouges, from 1932 to 1936. Picked for the 1934 World Cup, he did not play in the tournament.

== Honours ==
- Belgian international from 1932 to 1936 (12 caps and 3 goals)
- Picked for the 1934 Italy World Cup (did not play)
- Belgian league runners-up in 1936 with Standard de Liège
