= Louis Versyp =

Belgian footballer and manager

Personal information
- Date of birth: 5 December 1908
- Place of birth: Bruges, Belgium
- Date of death: 27 June 1988 (aged 79)
- Position: Striker

Senior career*
| Years | Team | Apps | (Gls) |
| 1926–1937 | Club Brugge | 362 | (150) |

International career
| 1928–1936 | Belgium | 34 | (8) |

Managerial career
- 1945–1950: Club Brugge
- 1950–1951: Melda Maldegem
- 1951–1952: AS Oostende KM
- 1952–1953: Cercle Brugge
- 1956–1957: Cercle Brugge
- 1958–1963: AS Oostende
- * Club domestic league appearances and goals

Louis Versyp, or Versijp, (5 December 1908 – 27 June 1988) was a Belgian football player and manager. He earned 34 caps and scored 8 goals for the Belgium national football team. He was part of Belgium's team for the 1928 Summer Olympics.

== Clubs ==
=== Player ===
- 1926–1937 Club Brugge

=== Manager ===
- 1945–1950 Club Brugge
- 1950–1951 Melda Maldegem
- 1951–1952 AS Oostende KM
- 1952–1953 Cercle Brugge
- 1956–1957 Cercle Brugge
- 1958–1963 AS Oostende
