= Nenad Jestrović =

Serbian footballer

Personal information
- Date of birth: 9 May 1976 (age 50)
- Place of birth: Obrenovac, SR Serbia, SFR Yugoslavia
- Height: 1.86 m (6 ft 1 in)
- Position: Forward

Senior career*
Years	Team	Apps	(Gls)
1992–1994	Radnički Obrenovac	44	(31)
1994–1997	OFK Beograd	34	(18)
1995–1996	→ Radnički Pirot (loan)		
1997–1998	Bastia	19	(2)
1998–2000	Metz	44	(8)
2000–2001	Mouscron	25	(20)
2001–2005	Anderlecht	81	(55)
2006	Al Ain	17	(16)
2006-2007	Al Nasr	20	(15)
2007–2008	Red Star Belgrade	22	(13)
2008	Kocaelispor	8	(3)
2009	Metz	9	(1)
Total		323	(182)

International career
2003–2005	Serbia and Montenegro	12	(5)
- * Club domestic league appearances and goals

Nenad Jestrović (Serbian Cyrillic: Ненад Јестровић; born 9 May 1976) is a Serbian retired footballer who played as a forward.

== Club career ==
Jestrović started his playing career with Radnički Obrenovac in the early 1990s. He then played for OFK Beograd in the First League of FR Yugoslavia, before moving abroad for the first time in the summer of 1997. Jestrović spent three years in France, representing SC Bastia (1997–1998) and Metz (1998–2000). He then moved to Belgian club Mouscron, having a lot of success in the 2000–01 season.

Jestrović spent the best years of his career at Anderlecht (2001–2005), becoming the Belgian First Division top scorer in the 2004–05 season. He made a total of 80 league appearances and scored 55 goals, before leaving the Brussels club in January 2006. Jestrović then spent a year and a half in the United Arab Emirates, playing for Al Ain and Al Nasr.

Jestrović also became the Serbian SuperLiga top scorer in the 2007–08 season while playing for Red Star Belgrade. He split his last season between Turkish club Kocaelispor (2008) and his former club Metz (2009), before retiring in the summer of 2009.

== International career ==
At international level, Jestrović represented Serbia and Montenegro from 2003 to 2005, making 12 appearances and scoring five goals. His final international was an August 2005 friendly match away against Ukraine.

== Career statistics ==
=== International ===
National team	Year	Apps	Goals
Serbia and Montenegro	2003	3	1
Serbia and Montenegro	2004	4	4
Serbia and Montenegro	2005	5	0
Total		12	5

=== International goals ===
Scores and results list Serbia and Montenegro's goal tally first, score column indicates score after each Jestrović goal.

List of international goals scored by Nenad Jestrović
No.	Date	Venue	Opponent	Score	Result	Competition
1.	3 June 2003	Walkers Stadium, Leicester, England	England	1–1	2–1	Friendly
2.	11 July 2004	Hakatanomori Athletic Stadium, Fukuoka, Japan	Slovakia	2–0	2–0	Kirin Cup
3.	18 August 2004	Bežigrad Central Stadium, Ljubljana, Slovenia	Slovenia	0–1	1–1	Friendly
4.	4 September 2004	Stadio Olimpico, Serravalle, San Marino	San Marino	0–2	0–3	2006 FIFA World Cup qualification
5.	4 September 2004	Stadio Olimpico, Serravalle, San Marino	San Marino	0–3	0–3	2006 FIFA World Cup qualification

== Honours ==
Bastia

- UEFA Intertoto Cup: 1997

Anderlecht

- Belgian First Division: 2003–04, 2005–06
- Belgian Super Cup: 2001

Individual

- Coupe de la Ligue topscorer: 1998–99
- Belgian First Division top scorer: 2004–05
- Serbian SuperLiga top scorer: 2007–08
