= Aruna Dindane =

Ivorian footballer (born 1980)

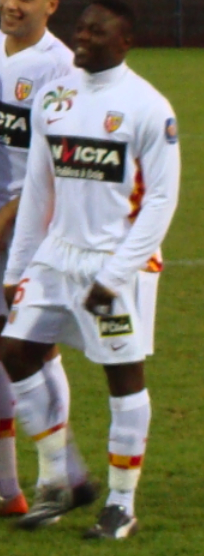
- Dindane playing for Lens in 2009

Personal information
- Full name: Aruna Dindane
- Date of birth: 26 November 1980 (age 45)
- Place of birth: Abidjan, Ivory Coast
- Height: 5 ft 9 in (1.75 m)
- Position: Striker

Youth career
- 1994–1995: Inconditionnel D'Adjamé
- 1995–1998: ASEC Mimosas

Senior career*
Years	Team	Apps	(Gls)
1998–2000	ASEC Mimosas	22	(9)
2000–2005	Anderlecht	131	(50)
2005–2010	Lens	102	(27)
2009–2010	→ Portsmouth (loan)	19	(8)
2010–2012	Lekhwiya	23	(5)
2012	Al-Gharafa	26	(1)
2012–2013	Al-Sailiya	18	(2)
2013	Crystal Palace	0	(0)
Total		341	(102)

International career
2000–2010	Ivory Coast	64	(18)
- * Club domestic league appearances and goals

Aruna Dindane (born 26 November 1980) is an Ivorian former professional footballer who played as a striker.

He has 62 caps and 17 goals for the Ivory Coast since his debut in 2000, and has played at four Africa Cup of Nations and two FIFA World Cups. At club level, he has played for clubs in Belgium, France, England and Qatar, as well as in the Ivory Coast.

== Club career ==
=== Anderlecht ===
Born in Abidjan, Ivory Coast, Dindane was transferred from Ivorian club ASEC Mimosas to RSC Anderlecht in the summer of 2000 and helped the team to win the Belgian First Division Championship in 2001 and 2004, as well a Supercup in 2000 and 2001. In 2003, Dindane won both the Ebony Shoe as the best player of African origin in the Belgian League and the Golden Shoe as the best player in the Belgian League. In November 2004, he was given a Swan D'Or Award for a spell of back-to-back hat-tricks.

=== Lens ===
In June 2005, Dindane signed for French Ligue 1 club RC Lens.

=== Portsmouth ===
In August 2009, Dindane joined Premier League team Portsmouth on a one-year loan deal, with the option to sign him at the end of his loan spell. He scored his first goal for Portsmouth in a 3–1 League Cup win over Carlisle United on 22 September 2009. and his first Premier League goal as part of a hat-trick in the 4–0 win over Wigan Athletic on 31 October. On 5 December 2009, he scored against Burnley with a header after missing a penalty earlier in the game. On 9 February 2010, Dindane scored a 95th-minute equaliser in the 1–1 draw with Sunderland at Fratton Park.

On 21 March 2010, it was revealed he was left out of Portsmouth's match squad the previous day as, if he played one more game, the club would have to pay a £4 million fee to Lens. With Portsmouth in administration, they could not afford to pay this fee, and so he was dropped. However, he subsequently played in the FA Cup semi-final against Tottenham Hotspur on 11 April 2010, and Portsmouth were aiming to negotiate terms with Lens that allow him to play in the FA Cup Final and the remaining Premier League games without incurring the £4 million fee. Dindane was an injury doubt for the FA Cup final and ultimately did not feature.

On 4 April 2010, it was revealed that Blackburn Rovers were preparing a £2.5 million bid for the striker in time for the 2010–11 season. Dindane underwent and passed a medical at the club, only for the transfer talk to cool due to financial disagreements between Blackburn and Lens. Dindane reiterated his desire to stay in English football after the loan to Portsmouth had ended. However, on 24 May 2010, Dindane agreed a three-year deal with Lekhwiya of Qatar.

=== Qatar ===
In January 2012, Dindane agreed to join Qatari club Al-Gharafa. After a short spell at Al-Gharafa, he signed a one-year deal with Al-Sailiya Sport Club on 27 May 2012.

=== Return to England ===
After half a season at Al-Sailiya, Dindane was released and started training with Leeds United. On 23 March 2013, he signed for Crystal Palace until the end of the 2012–13 season. He was released just prior to the end of the season without having made a senior appearance and with doubts over his fitness.

== After retirement ==
After his retirement, Dindane worked as general secretary of the Association des Footballeurs Ivoiriens (Ivorian Footballers Association).

== International career ==
Dindane made his debut for Ivory Coast on 9 April 2000 against Rwanda. He participated in the 2006 FIFA World Cup, where he scored twice in a memorable comeback to win 3–2 in their last group match against Serbia and Montenegro. However, the team failed to reach the second round due to previous defeats against Argentina and the Netherlands.

Dindane represented his country at the 2006 African Cup of Nations, but left the tournament on 22 January 2006 following the death of one of his twin daughters. He was also selected in the Ivorian squad for the 2008 African Cup of Nations in Ghana. He currently has 67 international caps for his country.

After Dindane's successful season in England for Portsmouth, where he scored 10 goals in 24 appearances, he was called up to the Ivorian squad for the 2010 FIFA World Cup. Dindane was a starter in their first two group games, against Portugal and Brazil.

== Career statistics ==
=== International goals ===
Scores and results list Ivory Coast's goal tally first.

No.	Date	Venue	Opponent	Score	Result	Competition
1.	2 July 2000	Stade Général Seyni Kountché, Niamey, Niger	Niger	1–0	1–0	2002 Africa Cup of Nations qualification
2.	8 June 2003	Stade Félix Houphouët-Boigny, Abidjan, Ivory Coast	Egypt	5–0	6–1	2004 Africa Cup of Nations qualification
3.	10 September 2003	Stade El Menzah, Tunis, Tunisia	Tunisia	1–3	2–3	Friendly
4.	6 June 2004	Stade Félix Houphouët-Boigny, Abidjan, Ivory Coast	Libya	1–0	2–0	2006 FIFA World Cup qualification
5.	20 June 2004	Alexandria Stadium, Alexandria, Egypt	Egypt	1–0	2–1	2006 FIFA World Cup qualification
6.	18 August 2004	Parc des Sports, Avignon, France	Senegal	2–1	2–1	Friendly
7.	5 September 2004	Stade Félix Houphouët-Boigny, Abidjan, Ivory Coast	Sudan	2–0	5–0	2006 FIFA World Cup qualification
8.	5 September 2004	Stade Félix Houphouët-Boigny, Abidjan, Ivory Coast	Sudan	5–0	5–0	2006 FIFA World Cup qualification
9.	10 October 2004	Stade de l'Amitié, Cotonou, Benin	Equatorial Guinea	1–0	1–0	2006 FIFA World Cup qualification
10.	8 February 2005	Stade Robert Diochon, Rouen, France	DR Congo	1–0	2–2	Friendly
11.	8 October 2005	Al-Merrikh Stadium, Omdurman, Sudan	Sudan	2–0	3–1	2006 FIFA World Cup qualification
12.	8 October 2005	Al-Merrikh Stadium, Omdurman, Sudan	Sudan	3–0	3–1	2006 FIFA World Cup qualification
13.	30 May 2006	Stade Jean-Bouloumie, Vittel, France	Chile	1–0	1–1	Friendly
14.	21 June 2006	Allianz Arena, Munich, Germany	Serbia and Montenegro	1–2	3–2	2006 FIFA World Cup
15.	21 June 2006	Allianz Arena, Munich, Germany	Serbia and Montenegro	2–2	3–2	2006 FIFA World Cup
16.	8 October 2006	Stade Félix Houphouët-Boigny, Abidjan, Ivory Coast	Gabon	3–0	5–0	2008 Africa Cup of Nations qualification
17.	25 March 2007	Stade Municipal de Mahamasina, Antananarivo, Madagascar	Madagascar	2–0	3–0	2008 Africa Cup of Nations qualification
18.	25 January 2008	Sekondi-Takoradi Stadium, Sekondi-Takoradi, Ghana	Benin	4–0	4–1	2008 Africa Cup of Nations

== Honours ==
ASEC Mimosas

- Côte d'Ivoire Premier Division: 2000
- CAF Super Cup: 1999

Anderlecht

- Belgian First Division: 2000–01, 2003–04
- Belgian Supercup: 2000, 2001

Lens

- UEFA Intertoto Cup: 2005
- Ligue 2: 2008–09

Portsmouth

- FA Cup runner-up: 2009–10

Ivory Coast

- Africa Cup of Nations runner-up: 2006

Individual

- Belgian Ebony Shoe: 2003
- Belgian Golden Shoe: 2003
