= Jean Capelle (footballer) =

Belgian footballer (1913–1977)

Personal information
- Date of birth: 26 October 1913
- Place of birth: Liège, Belgium
- Date of death: 20 February 1977 (aged 63)
- Place of death: Liège, Belgium
- Position: Striker

Senior career*
| Years | Team | Apps | (Gls) |
| 1929–1944 | Standard Liège | 285 | (245) |

International career
| 1931–1939 | Belgium | 34 | (19) |
- * Club domestic league appearances and goals

Jean Capelle (26 October 1913 – 20 February 1977) was a Belgian international footballer who played professionally as a striker for Standard Liège, scoring 245 goals in 285 appearances between 1929 and 1944. Capelle made his international debut in 1931, aged 17 years and 153 days. He also played at the 1934 FIFA World Cup as well as the 1938 FIFA World Cup.
