= Belgica Edegem Sport =

Defunct Belgian football club

- Full name: Koninklijke Voetbalverbroedering Belgica Edegem Sport
- Founded: 9 June 1908 (as Sporting FC Belgica)
- Dissolved: August 2016
- Ground: Vic Coveliersstadion, Edegem
- Final season; 2014–15: Second Provincial Antwerp (dissolved)

Koninklijke Voetbalverbroedering Belgica Edegem Sport, commonly known as KVV Belgica Edegem Sport, was a Belgian football club from the municipality of Edegem, in the suburbs of Antwerp. Founded in 1908 as Sporting FC Belgica, it played under matricule 375 of the Royal Belgian Football Association (KBVB) and spent two seasons in the top flight in the mid-1930s. After a long decline through the Belgian football league system, it merged with neighbouring KVV Edegem Sport in 1966 to form KVV Belgica Edegem Sport, and was declared bankrupt in August 2016.

== History ==
=== Sporting FC Belgica and Belgica FC Edegem (1908–1936) ===
The club was founded on 8 June 1908 at Café de la Station on Boniverlei in Edegem, under the name Sporting FC Belgica. It joined the Union Belge des Sociétés de Sports Athlétiques, the predecessor of the Royal Belgian Football Association, in 1910 and was assigned matricule 375. The original colours were red and green. Until the First World War, the team played on a pitch on Lentelei; activities were suspended from 1914 and the football section did not resume until 1924, when the club was reconstituted as Belgica FC Edegem and acquired a new ground on Mortselse Voetweg.

Belgica first reached the Second Division in 1930. In 1933, after three seasons at the second tier, it won its division and was promoted to the First Division. The club's first top-flight season, 1933–34, ended in a 12th-place finish out of 14, and it finished bottom of the table in 1934–35; these were its only seasons in the top flight, and it returned to the Second Division for the remainder of the 1930s.

=== KFC Belgica Edegem (1936–1966) ===
The club received the royal title in this period, and in 1936 was renamed KFC Belgica Edegem. Belgica remained in the Second Division through the early 1940s before declining steadily through the lower divisions in the post-war decades.

=== Merger and KVV Belgica Edegem Sport (1966–2016) ===
By the mid-1960s, both KFC Belgica Edegem and the neighbouring KVV Edegem Sport had fallen to Third Provincial. The merger discussions between Belgica's chairman Vic Coveliers and KVV Edegem Sport's chairman A. Hoeyberghs were initiated by the former Belgica player Albert Verbeeck, and on 17 April 1966 the two clubs merged. The new club, initially named Koninklijke Voetbalverbroedering Belgica Edegem and shortly afterwards KVV Belgica Edegem Sport, retained Belgica's matricule 375. Its colours were changed to silver and black—in practice white and black—to match the coat of arms of Edegem.

The merger proved unpopular with parts of Belgica's old guard. In 1974, Verbeeck—by then dissatisfied with the merged club—led a breakaway faction in founding a new FC Belgica, which played outside the Royal Belgian Football Association.

In its first season, KVV Belgica Edegem Sport narrowly missed promotion, finishing second in Third Provincial behind FC Mariekerke; it won the division in 1967–68. The club then spent sixteen seasons in Second Provincial before winning that division in 1983–84 to reach First Provincial Antwerp, where it remained for three years. It returned to First Provincial in 1991–92 but suffered consecutive relegations in 2008 and 2009, dropping to Third Provincial. After five seasons at that level, the club won the Third Provincial championship in 2014–15.

KVV Belgica Edegem Sport was declared bankrupt in August 2016 and dissolved, having spent its final season in Second Provincial.

== Stadium ==
From 1980, KVV Belgica Edegem Sport played at the Vic Coveliersstadion (Gemeentelijk Sportstadion Vic Coveliers) on Jan Verbertlei in Edegem, named for the former chairman who had been a driving force behind the 1966 merger. After the club's dissolution, the ground stood unused for a season; in 2017, the municipality of Edegem assigned it jointly to FC Belgica and VC Ostan, the two recreational clubs which had previously shared a pitch at Molenlei.

== Honours ==
- Belgian Second Division
  - Champions: 1932–33
- Third Provincial Antwerp
  - Champions: 1967–68, 2014–15
- Second Provincial Antwerp
  - Champions: 1983–84
