= K.S.C. Hasselt =

Football club in Belgium

KSC Hasselt
- Full name: Koninklijke Sporting Club Hasselt
- Nickname: den hai wai
- Founded: 1906
- Dissolved: 2001 (merged with KSK Kermt)
- Ground: Stedelijk Sportstadion Hasselt
- Capacity: 10,800
Home colours	Away colours

Koninklijke Sporting Club Hasselt was a Belgian football club. The matricule No. 37 was erased in 2001 after the merge with K.S.K. Kermt to become K.S.K. Kermt-Hasselt. The club played one season in the first division in 1979–80.

Excelsior FC Hasselt was founded in 1906. The club joined UBSSA and acquired a licence and number. Excelsior FC Hasselt was promoted to Second Division in 1911 and played there for 3 seasons, until World War I. The club returned to Second Division from 1921 to 1924–25. At the end of the season, E.F.C. Hasselt was demoted. The club played in Third Division from 1925 to 1930. Hasselt promoted to Second Division and stayed there till 1933. In 1933 the club received the royal title and became Royal Excelsior FC Hasselt. In 1938 Hasselt regained its spot in Second Division.

Royal Excelsior FC Hasselt degraded to Third Division in 1951 and continued to drop next season. A new division was added to the Belgian football league in 1952. Hasselt played in Fourth Division until 1955, when the club demoted again to First Provincial League. It won promotion back to the Fourth Division after two seasons in the Provincial League.

In 1964 Excelsior FC Hasselt merged with Hasseltse VV. Hasseltse VV was founded in 1916 and used number 65. The new fusion-club was named Sporting Club Hasselt, which continued to play with number 37. Club colors became green, white and blue.

The club started off in the Fourth Division. S.C. Hasselt ended second and was promoted to the Third Division. In 1977 S.C. Hasselt won its series and moved up to Second Division. The club played in First Division during the 1979–80 season, but ended last and demoted to Second Division again the next season. Hasselt managed to stay in Second Division until 1989. In 1996 S.C. Hasselt was degraded to Fourth Division. Two seasons later, the club was demoted to the Provincial Leagues.

In 2001 K.S.C. Hasselt merged with KSK Kermt (number 3245). The fusion-club continued as KS Kermt-Hasselt with number 3245 and used the accommodation in Kermt. The club name changed to KSK Hasselt in 2003 when KS Kermt-Hasselt returned to Hasselt.

The season that they were playing in the first division, they were playing with Dutch players Peter Ressel and Horst Blankenburg, who played for the national team. Some other well-known players played in Hasselt: former coach of the Belgium national team, René Vandereycken. He also played in Hasselt: father of Stijn Stijnen: Jean-Pierre Stijnen.

== Honours ==
- Belgian Second Division final round:
  - Winners (1): 1979
