= Bernard Voorhoof =

Belgian footballer (1910–1974)

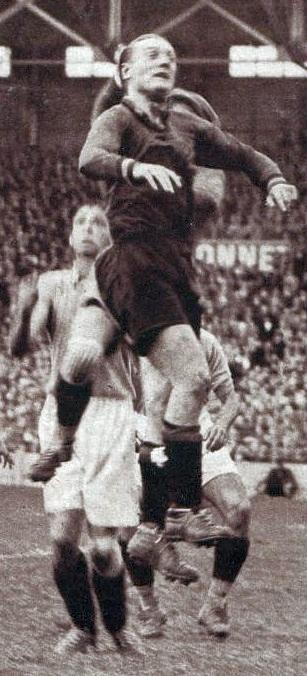
- Voorhoof (dark), during the 1938 World Cup quarter finals

Personal information
- Full name: Bernardus Ludovicus Voorhoof
- Date of birth: 10 May 1910
- Place of birth: Lier, Belgium
- Date of death: 18 February 1974 (aged 63)
- Place of death: Lier, Belgium
- Height: 1.76 m (5 ft 9 in)
- Position: Forward

Senior career*
| Years | Team | Apps | (Gls) |
| 1927–1948 | Lierse | 529 | (365) |
| 1948–1949 | RRFC Montegnée | 30 | (15) |
| Total | | 559 | (380) |

International career
| 1928–1940 | Belgium | 61 | (30) |
- * Club domestic league appearances and goals

Bernard Voorhoof (10 May 1910 – 18 February 1974) was a Belgian footballer, who held the title of the Belgium national team's top scorer for 34 years, netting 30 goals in 61 matches. In 1972, he was joined by Paul Van Himst, who took 81 matches to reach the same goal tally. However, both have since been surpassed by Romelu Lukaku and Eden Hazard.

== Career ==
Voorhoof commenced his career at Lierse, remaining with the club for an impressive 21 years. During his tenure, he remarkably scored 350 goals across 529 matches and secured two Belgian First Division titles. Additionally, in the shortened 1940−41 season, he contributed to a third unofficial title. Before retiring at the age of 39 in 1949, he also spent a season with RRFC Montegnée.

He was part of Belgium's team at the 1928 Summer Olympics, but did not play in any matches. Voorhoof played in the 1930, 1934 and 1938 World Cups, being one of six known people (five players and one match official) to have appeared in all three of the pre-war World Cups. At the 1934 World Cup held in Italy, Voorhoof scored twice in Belgium's 5−2 defeat to Germany. These were the first Belgian goals in a FIFA World Cup, as the Belgium national team failed to find the net in 1930.

He held the Belgian caps record from 5 May 1938 (when he equalled the total of Armand Swartenbroeks) until 13 April 1958, when his total was surpassed by Vic Mees. He held the Belgian record of goals since 13 March 1938, when he equalled the total of Robert De Veen, until Paul Van Himst equalled his tally of 30 international goals for Belgium on 17 June 1972. Romelu Lukaku broke their record in November 2017.

== Career statistics ==
Scores and results list Belgium's goal tally first, score column indicates score after each Voorhoof goal.

List of international goals scored by Bernard Voorhoof
| No. | Date | Venue | Opponent | Score | Result | Competition | Ref. |
|---|---|---|---|---|---|---|---|
| 1 | 15 April 1928 | Stade Yves-du-Manoir, Colombes, France | France | 1–0 | 3–2 | Friendly | |
| 2 | 18 May 1930 | Olympisch Stadion, Antwerp, Belgium | Netherlands | 1–1 | 3–1 | Friendly | |
| 3 | 25 May 1930 | Stade du Pont d'Ougrée, Ougrée, Belgium | France | 1–0 | 1–2 | Friendly | |
| 4 | 21 September 1930 | Bosuilstadion, Antwerp, Belgium | Czechoslovakia | 2–3 | 2–3 | Friendly | |
| 5 | 7 December 1930 | Stade Buffalo, Paris, France | France | 2–1 | 2–2 | Friendly | |
| 6 | 29 March 1931 | Olympic Stadium, Amsterdam, Netherlands | Netherlands | 2–3 | 2–3 | Friendly | |
| 7 | 3 May 1931 | Bosuilstadion, Antwerp, Belgium | Netherlands | 1–1 | 4–2 | Friendly | |
| 8 | 3 May 1931 | Bosuilstadion, Antwerp, Belgium | Netherlands | 2–1 | 4–2 | Friendly | |
| 9 | 11 October 1931 | King Baudouin Stadium, Brussels, Belgium | Poland | 2–0 | 2–1 | Friendly | |
| 10 | 12 February 1933 | King Baudouin Stadium, Brussels, Belgium | Italy | 1–1 | 2–3 | Friendly | |
| 11 | 12 February 1933 | King Baudouin Stadium, Brussels, Belgium | Italy | 2–1 | 2–3 | Friendly | |
| 12 | 12 March 1933 | Letzigrund, Zürich, Switzerland | Switzerland | 2–2 | 3–3 | Friendly | |
| 13 | 12 March 1933 | Letzigrund, Zürich, Switzerland | Switzerland | 3–3 | 3–3 | Friendly | |
| 14 | 7 May 1933 | Olympisch Stadion, Antwerp, Belgium | Netherlands | 2–1 | 2–1 | Friendly | |
| 15 | 11 June 1933 | Praterstadion, Vienna, Austria | Austria | 1–0 | 1–4 | Friendly | |
| 16 | 21 January 1934 | King Baudouin Stadium, Brussels, Belgium | France | 1–1 | 2–3 | Friendly | |
| 17 | 11 March 1934 | Olympisch Stadion, Antwerp, Belgium | Netherlands | 1–0 | 3-9 | Friendly | |
| 18 | 29 April 1934 | Bosuilstadion, Antwerp, Belgium | Netherlands | 2–3 | 2–4 | 1934 FIFA World Cup qualification | |
| 19 | 27 May 1934 | Stadio Giovanni Berta, Florence, Italy | Germany | 1–1 | 5–2 | 1934 FIFA World Cup | |
| 20 | 27 May 1934 | Stadio Giovanni Berta, Florence, Italy | Germany | 2–1 | 5–2 | 1934 FIFA World Cup | |
| 21 | 31 March 1935 | Olympic Stadium, Amsterdam, Netherlands | Netherlands | 2–0 | 2–4 | Friendly | |
| 22 | 18 April 1937 | King Baudouin Stadium, Brussels, Belgium | Switzerland | 1–2 | 1–2 | Friendly | |
| 23 | 10 June 1937 | Stadionul Republicii, Bucharest, Romania | Romania | 1–2 | 1–2 | Friendly | |
| 24 | 30 January 1938 | Parc des Princes, Paris, France | France | 2–1 | 3–5 | Friendly | |
| 25 | 27 February 1938 | De Kuip, Rotterdam, Netherlands | Netherlands | 2–4 | 2–7 | Friendly | |
| 26 | 13 March 1938 | Stade Municipal, Luxembourg City, Luxembourg | Luxembourg | 1–1 | 3–2 | 1938 FIFA World Cup qualification | |
| 27 | 8 May 1938 | Stade Olympique de la Pontaise, Lausanne, Switzerland | Switzerland | 1–0 | 3–0 | Friendly | |
| 28 | 8 May 1938 | Stade Olympique de la Pontaise, Lausanne, Switzerland | Switzerland | 2–0 | 3–0 | Friendly | |
| 29 | 14 May 1939 | Stade Vélodrome de Rocourt, Liège, Belgium | Switzerland | 1–1 | 1–2 | Friendly | |
| 30 | 17 March 1940 | Bosuilstadion, Antwerp, Belgium | Netherlands | 2–0 | 7–1 | Friendly | |

== Honours ==
Lierse

- Belgian First Division: 1931–32, 1939–40, 1940–41, 1941–42

Records

- Former Belgium's most capped player: 1938–1958 (61 caps)
- Former Belgium's national record goalscorer: 1940–2017 (30 goals)
