= AS Oostende =

Former Belgian football club

- Full name: Athletische Sportvereniging Oostende Koninklijke Maatschappij
- Founded: 1911 (as Association Sportive Ostendaise)
- Dissolved: 1 July 1981 (merger with VGO Oostende to form K.V. Oostende)
- Ground: Albertpark
- Capacity: 10,709
- Final season; 1980–81: Belgian Third Division, 8th of 16
Home colours

Athletische Sportvereniging Oostende Koninklijke Maatschappij was a Belgian football club from the city of Ostend, West Flanders until its merger with VGO Oostende to form K.V. Oostende in 1981.

== History ==
The club was founded in 1911 as Association Sportive Ostendaise (in French) with the matricule n°63. Eleven years later it competed in the second division for the first time as part of league expansion, though only remained there until 1926 when organisers decided to reduce the number of sections from two to one – Oostende had finished 9th of 14 teams in its section that season, while only the top seven were admitted to the new second tier. In 1931 the two-section setup was restored and the club regained its position, staying there for most of the next four decades aside from three short spells at the level below; at the end of the Second World War, it was renamed as A.S.V. Oostende K.M., and survived the next reduction of the second tier to one section in 1952 with a 3rd place in the table.

Promotion to the first division was achieved for the first time in 1969 by winning the second division. They went straight back down, and at the end of another terrible season in 1971 dropped down further to the third division; however, this was soon followed by two successive promotions in 1973 and 1974 to return to the top level. The highest position reached by the club was 12th in 1976, but they were relegated again the following year. In 1981, having fallen into the third division, the club disappeared following a merger with VGO Oostende, the new entity K.V. Oostende retaining the older matricule (n°31) of VGO.
