= List of Cercle Brugge KSV players =

A complete list of footballers who have made at least one appearance in an official match for the Belgian football team Cercle Brugge KSV. Second nationalities are shown before the name of the player.

== Albania ==
- (Kosovo) Besnik Hasi
- Ylli Shehu

== Australia ==
- Lorenz Kindtner
- Eddie Krncevic
- Dominic Longo
- Andy Vlahos

== Belgium ==
- Jacques Acket
- Maurice Adamson
- Xavier Aelter
- André Aerts
- Ernest Aerts
- Patrick Albert
- Johan Allemeersch
- Germain Alleyn
- Anthony Annicaert
- Albert Antjon
- Kristof Arys
- David Avonture
- Albéric Baelen
- Aimé Baert
- Omer Baervoets
- Dominique Baes
- Louis Baes
- Omer Baes
- Gilbert Bailliu
- Alfons Ballegeer
- Ronny Ballegeer
- Céléstin Bauwens
- Germain Becu
- Roland Beelen
- Ricky Begeyn
- Dirk Beheydt
- Ignace Bekemans
- Albéric Berghman
- Prudent Bettens
- Bernard Beuken
- Daniël Beun
- Arthur Beuselinck
- Eric Beyrens
- Michel Billen
- Robert Billiet
- Johnny Bleyaert
- Maurice Blieck
- Roger Blieck
- Roger Blieck
- Joseph Boereboom
- Roland Boey
- John Bogaert
- Joris Bogaert
- Frederik Boi
- Achille Bonami
- Vital Borkelmans
- Ronny Borloo
- Robert Braet
- Benoit Brilleman
- Jackie Brinckman
- Geert Broeckaert
- Gerard Brulez
- Fernand Bruneel
- Gianni Brunello
- Thomas Buffel
- Jules Bulckaert
- Raoul Bullynck
- Eric Buyse
- Marc Calcoen
- Raymond Callens
- Alex Camerman
- Franky Carlier
- Peter Carly
- Edmond Casteleyn
- Henri Catry
- André Cherlet
- Olivier Claessens
- Adolphe Claeys
- Geoffrey Claeys
- Jean Claeys
- Octave Claeys
- Rik Claeys
- Roger Claeys
- David Coeman
- Geert Coens
- Joseph Cools
- Peter Cooman
- Maurice Coopman
- Davy Cooreman
- Jo Coppens
- Hans Cornelis
- Karel Cornelissen
- Jean Corthouts
- Maurice Couilleit
- Walther Couilleit
- Paul Courant
- Emile Cousin
- Dimitri Craeye
- Willy Craeye
- Georges Crampe
- Maurice Crépain
- Henri Croenen
- Eric Daels
- Albéric Daled
- Bjorn Daeninck
- Eric Damman
- Raymond Danneels
- Rubin Dantschotter
- Willy Dasseville
- Raoul Daufresne
- Jacques Dautricourt
- Réginald Dautricourt
- Georges Daveloose
- Mario David
- Alfons De Backer
- Charles Debbaudt
- Georges Debbaut
- Alex De Beule
- Prosper De Bois
- Gerard De Breuck
- Johan De Buyser
- Marc De Buyser
- Emile De Buysere
- Robert De Buysere
- Jackie De Caluwé
- Jérôme De Caluwé
- Robert De Caluwé
- Alain De Clercq
- Willy De Cock
- Nico Deconinck
- Alphonse Decorte
- Fernand De Corte
- Maurice De Corte
- Pol Decoussemaecker
- Luc Decoussemaecker
- Gino De Craemer
- Aurèle De Decker
- Gilbert De Duytsche
- Maurice Degraeve
- Etienne De Grande
- Albert De Gruyter
- Andy Degryse
- Guy Dejaeghere
- Wouter De Jonckheere
- Dieter Dekelver
- Giovanni Dekeyser
- Albert De Kimpe
- Albert Delaender
- Hervé Delesie
- Artur De Lissnyder
- André Deloof
- Carlos De Loof
- Florent Deloof
- Jacques De Loof
- Michel Deloof
- Richard Deloof
- Dimitri Delporte
- Davy De Maertelaere
- Firmin De Maertelaere
- Léon De Meester
- Sam de Meester
- Noël Demey
- Dirk De Meyer
- Stefaan Demol
- Mathieu Denier
- Alain De Nil
- Ewout Denys
- Fritz Denys
- Edouard Deplancke
- Joachim De Plancke
- Joseph Deplancke
- Peter Depoorter
- Maurice De Preetere
- Victor Derboven
- Joseph De Roo
- Joseph De Rous
- Marcel Desaever
- André De Schepper
- Albert De Sloovere
- Willem De Sloovere
- Philemon Desmaele
- Albéric De Smedt
- André De Smedt
- Edgard De Smedt
- Geert Desmet
- Stijn De Smet
- Georges Desnoeck
- Rik Desplancke
- Carlos De Steur
- Johan De Stickere
- Willy Destordeur
- Tom De Sutter
- Sylvere De Vadder
- Philibert De Vlaeminck
- Gérard Devos
- Guy De Vos
- Marcel De Vos
- Gino Devriendt
- Dirk De Vriese
- Danny Devuyst
- Etienne De Vylder
- Bartel De Waele
- Filip Dewaele
- Jean-Marie Dewalleff
- Patrick Dewispelaere
- Roland De Wispelaere
- Jimmy De Wulf
- Joseph De Wulf
- Léon De Wulf
- Filip D'Haemers
- Kristof D'haene
- André Dhondt
- Stefaan D'Hondt
- Valère Dhooghe
- Dick D'Hoore
- Paul D'Hoore
- Carlos Dierickx
- Sven Dobbelaere
- Guy Droessaert
- Cyrille Druwel
- Gaston Eeckeman
- Gustave Eeckeman
- Walter Elegeert
- Vincent Euvrard
- Bernt Evens
- Joseph Evrard
- Matthias Feys
- Yves Feys
- Marc Flamée
- Didier Frenay
- Jean Pierre Gardin
- Johan Geeraerts
- Charles Geernaert
- Sven Geldof
- Omer Georges
- Hans Gerard
- Jo Gerard
- Daniël Giraldo
- Maurice Goderis
- Georges Goegebeur
- Léon Goegebeur
- Marcel Goeminne
- Fernand Goyvaerts
- Bernard Haazen
- Rudi Haleydt
- Pierre Hanon
- Alain Henderickx
- Wim Henneman
- Maurice Herreboudt
- Raymond Herreboudt
- Benoni Herssens
- Julien Herssens
- André Heyns
- Dirk Hinderyckx
- Joël Hoste
- Marcel Houwen
- Franco Iovino
- Patrick Ipermans
- Pierre Iweins d'Eeckhoutte
- Georges Jacobus
- Walter Jacobus
- Romain Janssen
- Joseph Janssens
- Kevin Janssens
- (Morocco) Nordin Jbari
- Gilbert Kerrebrouck
- Emile Keukelinck
- Roland Keygnaert
- Lucien Kyndt
- Lionel Ladon
- Patrick Lagrou
- Charles Lahousse
- Bert Lamaire
- Raymond Lamaire
- Willy Lambert
- Jürgen Landuyt
- Frans Lantsoght
- Paul Lantsoght
- Raf Lapeire
- Christophe Lauwers
- Frans Lefevere
- Philippe Lejour
- Stanislas Lekens
- Antoon Leleu
- Charles Leleu
- Klaas Lesage
- Willy Leyssens
- Gilbert Libon
- Arthur Liénard
- Joseph Lips
- Frans Loos
- Geert Lootens
- Albert Lowyck
- Frans Lowyck
- Jean Lucker
- Raoul Lucker
- Luc Maenhout
- Gaston Maes
- Gino Maes
- Omer Maes
- Steven Maes
- Jerry Maeseele
- Grégoire Maieu
- Henri Mallet
- Dieudonné Martens
- Florimond Martens
- Louis Martens
- Jan Masureel
- Albert Masyn
- Germain Masyn
- Gustave Matthijs
- Laurent Matthys
- Gregory Mertens
- Filip Messens
- Gustaaf Messens
- Franky Mestdagh
- Harold Meyssen
- Albert Michiels
- Marcel Mitchell
- John Moelaert
- Bernard Moerman
- Rudy Moerman
- Peter Mollez
- Urbain Monte
- Maurice Moreeuw
- Willy Mortier
- Marc Mouton
- Gino Moyaert
- Joseph Muyle
- Ignace Muylle
- Albert Naert
- Léon Naessens
- Maurice Naessens
- Raymond Naessens
- Arne Naudts
- Frank Neve
- Johnny Nierynck
- Luc Noé
- Célestin Nollet
- Michel Nollet
- Kenneth Notte
- Patrick Notteboom
- Roger Notteboom
- Camille Nuwel
- Raymond Orban
- Richard Orlans
- Kevin Packet
- Bart Pannecoucke
- Joeri Pardo
- Ernest Patfoort
- André Perot
- Marcel Pertry
- Alfons Pettens
- Philip Piedfort
- Marceau Pillaert
- Franco Pirelli
- Tim Plovie
- Robert Poelvoorde
- Arthur Pollet
- Rudy Poorteman
- René Popelier
- Anthony Portier
- Fernand Proot
- Roger Proot
- Joseph Pruüost
- Maurice Quaghebeur
- Alex Querter
- Camille Quintens
- André Raes
- Thierry Raskin
- René Renson
- Björn Renty
- Carlos Reuse
- Emile Reuse
- Albert Reychler
- Björn Roets
- Marcel Roeykens
- Pierre Roggeman
- Marin Roje
- Albéric Roose
- André Roose
- Albert Ruysschaert
- Arthur Ruysschaert
- Willy Ryckebusch
- Adrien Ryde
- Etienne Ryde
- Joeri Sabbe
- André Saeys
- Louis Saeys
- Sylvain Saeys
- Luc Sanders
- Paul Sanders
- Carlos Scheerens
- Achille Schelstraete
- Philippe Schepens
- Jacques Schoofs
- André Schoonbaert
- Georges Schotte
- Pierre Schotte
- Roger Schotte
- Paul Schouppe
- Björn Sengier
- Tony Sergeant
- Robert Serru
- Ronny Sierens
- Jan Simoen
- Roger Simoens
- François Simoens
- Franky Simon
- Willy Sinack
- Thierry Siquet
- Alphonse Six
- Jules Six
- Julien Six
- Adi Slabbinck
- André Snauwaert
- Kristof Snelders
- Kurt Soenens
- Ghislain Somers
- Robert Somers
- Maurice Soyez
- Alessio Staelens
- Fabrice Staelens
- Sébastien Stassin
- Steve Stellamans
- Johan Sterckx
- Jan Steyaert
- Dirk Stock
- Andy Stroy
- Carlos Strubbe
- Fernand Strubbe
- Jean Strubbe
- Maurice Strypsteen
- Modeste Suvée
- Walter Swimberghe
- Joris Tavernier
- Emmanuel Talloen
- Albert Tanghe
- Günther Tanghe
- Gilbert Thibaut de Maisières
- Guy Thys
- Arthur Timmerman
- Etienne Timmerman
- Charles Traen
- Octave Traen
- Louis Trypsteen
- Nico Vaesen
- Willy Van Acker
- Edgard Van Bocxstaele
- Emile Van Cappel
- Albert Van Cleynenbreugel
- Albert Van Coile
- André Vandamme
- Camiel Van Damme
- Jens Van Damme
- Léon Van de Vijver
- Richard Van de Walle
- Serge Van de Walle
- Silveer Vanden Berghe
- Aimé Vanden Weghe
- Johan Vandenabeele
- Marc Van den Abeele
- Hans Van Den Broeck
- Gregoire Vandenbroele
- Bram Vandenbussche
- Francky Vandendriessche
- Hugo Vandenheede
- Michel Vanderbauwhede
- Luc Vanderbeken
- Jozef Vandercruyssen
- Delphin Vanderhaeghen
- Yves Vanderhaeghe
- Jan van der Hoeven
- Luc Vanderschommen
- Jan Vanderweeën
- Eric Vandewiele
- Jan Vandyck
- Wim Vandycke
- Léon Van Eeghem
- Carlos Van Eenoo
- Geert Van Eenoo
- Lukas Van Eenoo
- Kris Vangaever
- Richard Van Gassen
- Franky Vanhaecke
- Flavien Vanhalme
- Florimond Vanhalme
- Marcel Vanhalme
- Cyrille Van Haverbeke
- Jozef Vanhecke
- Hendrik Van Hende
- Eugeen Van Hoorickx
- Léopold Van Hoorickx
- Erwin Vanhoucke
- Willy Vanhoucke
- Frans Vanhoutte
- Koen Van Hove
- André Vanhullebus
- Edmond Van Iseghem
- Marc Van Iseghem
- Joseph Van Kersschaever
- Marc Vanlancker
- André Van Lommel
- Daniël Van Loo
- Willy Van Loo
- Albert Van Loocke
- Achille Van Maele
- Dominique Vanmaele
- Fernand Van Middel
- Tom Van Mol
- Eric Vanoverbeke
- Urbain Van Pottelberghe
- Henri Vanpoucke
- Julien Vanpoucke
- Walter Van Poucke
- Kristoff Van Robays
- Médard Van Rolleghem
- Karel Van Roose
- Medard Vansteenkiste
- Jef Vanthournout
- Joseph Van Tomme
- Joseph Van Vlaenderen
- Robert Van Vlaenderen
- Frans Van Walleghem
- Joseph Van Wassenhove
- Bram Verbist
- André Verbruggen
- Edmond Verbruggen
- John Vercammen
- Luc Vercammen
- Robert Vercruysse
- Fabio Vergucht
- Bernard Verheecke
- Jan Verhelst
- Marc Verheye
- Roger Verkeyn
- Raoul Verleye
- Julien Vermeersch
- Maurice Vermeersch
- René Vermeersch
- Charles Vernimme
- Camille Verriest
- Jules Verriest
- Aimé Verstraete
- Edmond Verté
- Igor Vetokele
- Denis Viane
- Albert Vollekindt
- Jelle Vossen
- Raphaël Vyncke
- Gustaaf Wardenier
- (Socialist Federal Republic of Yugoslavia) (Croatia) Josip Weber
- Edouard Weghsteen
- Willy Wellens
- Alfred Willems
- Didier Wittebole
- Dieter Wittesaele
- Gilbert Wittevrongel
- Robert Wittevrongel
- Etienne Wybaillie
- Roger Wybo
- Marcel Zanders
- Pieter Zeenaeme

== Bosnia and Herzegovina ==
- Alen Avdić
- Milenko Milošević
- Nenad Mišković

== Brazil ==
- (Portugal) Geo Carvalho
- Carlos Dos Santos
- Roberto Gambasi
- Fabio Giuntini
- Kanu
- Marcos Lucas
- Renato Neto
- Reynaldo
- Robson Saint Clair
- Leandro Simioni

== Cameroon ==
- Christian Makoun Sr.
- Sanda Sanda

== China ==
- Wang Yang

== Democratic Republic of the Congo ==
- (Belgium) Didier Bapupa
- Nicaise Kudimbana
- Raphaël N'Zoko
- Polo Nzuzi
- Jerry Tondelua

== Côte d'Ivoire ==
- Armand Mahan

== Croatia ==
- Branko Karačić
- Jerko Tipurić

== Czech Republic ==
- Vít Valenta
- Roman Vonášek

== Denmark ==
- Christian Andersen
- Erhard Auerbach
- Ole Budtz
- Michael Gernsø
- Benny Nielsen
- Morten Olsen
- Robert Skibsted
- Søren Skov

== England ==
- Basil Cowan
- Brian Etheridge
- Luke Jones
- Alfred Kennedy
- Randolph Richards
- Richard Saker
- Jerome Watt

== Finland ==
- Kari Laukkanen
- Paulus Roiha
- Kari Ukkonen

== France ==
- Franck Bernhard
- (Guinea) Mohamed Berthé
- (Guadeloupe) Philippe Durpes
- (Madagascar) Christophe Grondin
- Mehdi Makhloufi
- Albert Milleville
- Stéphane Narayaninnaiken
- Didier Six

== Germany ==
- Max Höllriegel
- Peter Közle
- (Belgium) Angelo Maraldo
- Günter Nasdalla
- Sergio Peter
- Jürgen Todebusch
- Andreas Wagner

== Ghana ==
- (Belgium) Isaac Asare
- (Belgium) Kofi Mbeah
- (Belgium) William Osei Berkoe
- William Owusu

== Guinea ==
- Kader Camara

== Haiti ==
- Carlens Arcus

== Hungary ==
- László Hársányi
- Zoltán Locskai
- Gyula Nemes
- Gábor Torma

== Iceland ==
- Sævar Jónsson
- Ragnar Margeirsson
- Arnar Vidarsson

== Republic of Ireland ==
- Dominic Foley

== Republic of Macedonia ==
- Igor Gjuzelov
- Jurica Siljanoski

== Malawi ==
- Kennedy Malunga
- Frank Sinalo

== Mali ==
- Abdoulaye Camara

== Mauritius ==
- Ned Charles

== Mexico ==
- (Netherlands) Teun Wilke

== Montenegro ==
- Bojan Božović
- Milan Purović

== Morocco ==
- Nacer Abdellah

== Netherlands ==
- Wouter Artz
- Aimé Baas
- Leendert Barth
- Aschwin Christina
- Steven De Croock
- Jan de Koning
- Peter De Quant
- Luciano Dompig
- (Suriname) Cyrus Dos Santos
- Arjan Human
- (Suriname) Virgall Joemankhan
- Wim Kooiman
- Gerrie Kleton
- Kees Krijgh
- Tommy Krommendijk
- Ibad Muhamadu
- (Suriname) Brian Pinas
- Ricky Talan
- Robert Van Der Schildt
- Arthur Van Huizen
- Bram Van Kerkhof
- Hennie Van Nee
- Hans Van Someren
- Wietse Veenstra
- Adri Versluys

== Nigeria ==
- Muisi Ajao
- Osahon Eboigbe

== Northern Ireland ==
- Tony Kane

== Norway ==
- Frode Fermann
- Jan Ove Pedersen

== Peru ==
- José Carlos Fernández

== Poland ==
- Ernest Konon
- Zbigniew Swietek

== Portugal ==
- (Guinea-Bissau) Amido Baldé
- Nuno Reis
- (Angola) Rudi
- William Da Silva Carvalho

== Romania ==
- Marius Cheregi
- Ovidiu Hanganu
- Ion Ionescu
- Dorinel Munteanu
- Tibor Selymes
- Ilie Stan

== Russia ==
- Mikhail Karassev
- (Armenia) Vahram Kevorkian

== Senegal ==
- Papa Sene

== Serbia ==
- Aleksandar Mutavdžić
- Darko Pivaljević
- Slobodan Slović
- Đorđe Svetličić

== Sierra Leone ==
- (Belgium) Mohamed Kanu

== Slovakia ==
- Tomáš Labun

== Slovenia ==
- Dejan Kelhar

== Spain ==
- (Belgium) Gregorio Bahamonde

== Ukraine ==
- (Belgium) Oleg Iachtchouk
- (Russia) Serhiy Serebrennikov

== Yugoslavia ==
- (Belgium) Zoran Bojović
- (Serbia) Zoran Ivšić
- (Croatia) Ivo Jerolimov
- (Serbia) Hajrudin Rovčanin
- (Croatia) Zdenko Vukasović

== Zambia ==
- Joe Bwalya
- Kalusha Bwalya
- Charly Musonda

== Zimbabwe ==
- Honour Gombami
- Vusumuzi Nyoni
- Obadiah Tarumbwa

== Top 50 most appearances ==
As of match played 29 May 2011 in which the names in bold means that these players are still active for Cercle Brugge.

#	Name	Nationality	Appearances
1	Jules Verriest	Belgium	492
2	**Denis Viane**	Belgium	379
3	Geert Broeckaert	Belgium	376
4	Arthur Ruysschaert	Belgium	372
5	Roger Claeys	Belgium	362
6	Jackie De Caluwé	Belgium	354
7	Robert Braet	Belgium	352
8	Rudy Poorteman	Belgium	347
9	Bram Van Kerkhof	Netherlands	339
	Wim Kooiman	Netherlands	339
11	Franky Simon	Belgium	334
12	Florimond Vanhalme	Belgium	329
13	Henri Vanpoucke	Belgium	322
14	Kurt Soenens	Belgium	320
15	Louis Baes	Belgium	311
16	Maurice Crépain	Belgium	307
17	Louis Saeys	Belgium	305
	Marin Roje	Belgium	305
19	Dirk Beheydt	Belgium	295
20	Frederik Boi	Belgium	282
21	Marcel Pertry	Belgium	280
22	Adi Slabbinck	Belgium	267
23	Eric Buyse	Belgium	265
24	Philippe Schepens	Belgium	256
25	Willy Mortier	Belgium	233
26	Michel Vanderbauwhede	Belgium	231
27	Prosper De Bois	Belgium	227
	Gilbert Bailliu	Belgium	227
29	Yves Feys	Belgium	221
30	Didier Frenay	Belgium	216
31	Benoit Brilleman	Belgium	215
	Bert Lamaire	Belgium	215
33	Raoul Verleye	Belgium	214
34	Filip Dewaele	Belgium	211
35	Jef Vanthournout	Belgium	208
36	Bram Vandenbussche	Belgium	206
37	Albert Antjon	Belgium	204
	Paul Sanders	Belgium	204
	Josip Weber	Belgium; Croatia	204
	Giovanni Dekeyser	Belgium	204
41	John Bogaert	Belgium	201
	Peter Carly	Belgium	201
43	Gaston Maes	Belgium	198
44	Edmond Verbruggen	Belgium	183
45	Albert Van Coile	Belgium	182
46	Gérard Devos	Belgium	178
47	André Saeys	Belgium	172
48	Delphin Vanderhaegen	Belgium	170
49	Omer Baes	Belgium	166
50	Pierre Schotte	Belgium	164
	Stijn De Smet	Belgium	164

== Top 50 most goals ==
As of match played 29 May 2011 and according to www.cerclemuseum.be. Names in bold means that these players are still active for Cercle Brugge.

#	Name	Nationality	Goals
1	Marcel Pertry	Belgium	140
2	Josip Weber	Belgium; Croatia	136
3	Dirk Beheydt	Belgium	115
4	Michel Vanderbauwhede	Belgium	109
5	Arthur Ruysschaert	Belgium	108
6	Gilbert Bailliu	Belgium	104
7	Louis Saeys	Belgium	103
8	Gérard Devos	Belgium	100
9	Alphonse Six	Belgium	93
10	André Saeys	Belgium	55
	Eric Buyse	Belgium	55
12	Søren Skov	Denmark	53
13	Frans Lowyck	Belgium	52
14	Roger Proot	Belgium	50
	Henri Vanpoucke	Belgium	50
16	Roger Claeys	Belgium	48
	Christophe Lauwers	Belgium	48
18	Branko Karačić	Croatia	45
19	Pierre Schotte	Belgium	44
20	Guy Thys	Belgium	43
21	Albert Naert	Belgium	41
	Paul Sanders	Belgium	41
23	**Oleg Iachtchouk**	Ukraine; Belgium	39
	Frans Vanhoute	Belgium	39
	Vic Derboven	Belgium	39
26	Pierre Roggeman	Belgium	38
	Raf Lapeire	Belgium	38
28	Joël Hoste	Belgium	37
29	Edmond Verté	Belgium	36
	Eric Daels	Belgium	36
	Franky Vanhaecke	Belgium	36
32	Florimond Vanhalme	Belgium	35
	Alphonse Decorte	Belgium	35
	Kalusha Bwalya	Zambia	35
	Stijn De Smet	Belgium	35
36	Gábor Torma	Hungary	33
37	Jackie De Caluwé	Belgium	32
38	Gustaaf Eeckeman	Belgium	31
39	Roger Blieck	Belgium	30
	Benny Nielsen	Denmark	30
	Davy Cooreman	Belgium	30
42	Roger Notteboom	Belgium	29
43	Johan Vandenabeele	Belgium	28
	Frans Loos	Belgium	28
	André Pérot	Belgium	28
46	Gerrie Kleton	Netherlands	27
47	Albert Van Coile	Belgium	26
	André Cherlet	Belgium	26
	Richard Van Gassen	Belgium	26
	Filip Dewaele	Belgium	26
	Bernard Verheecke	Belgium	26
	Eddie Krncevic	Australia	26
	Tom De Sutter	Belgium	26

== See also ==
- Cercle Brugge K.S.V.
