= List of Club Brugge KV players =

Club Brugge KV is a Belgian professional football team formed in 1891. Throughout its history the club's first team has competed in various national and international competitions. All players who have played in 50 or more such matches are listed below.

== Key ==
- Players with name in **bold** currently play for the club.
- Years are the first and last calendar years in which the player appeared in competitive first-team football for the club.
- League appearances and goals comprise those in the Belgian First Division A and its predecessors of top-level league football in Belgium.
- Total appearances and goals comprise those in the Belgian First Division A, Belgian First Division A Playoffs, Belgian Cup, Belgian League Cup, Belgian Super Cup, UEFA Europa League, UEFA Europa League and several now-defunct competitions.

== Players with 50 or more appearances ==
Appearances and goals are for first-team competitive matches only. Substitute appearances are included. Statistics are correct as of 1 May 2017.

Position key: GK – Goalkeeper; DF – Defender; MF – Midfielder; FW – Forward

Name	Nationality	Position	Club Brugge career	League Appearances	League Goals	Total Appearances	Total Goals	Notes
Eric Addo	Ghana	DF	1996–1999	60	5	85	7	
Joseph Akpala	Nigeria	FW	2008–2012	105	38	168	56	
Antolín Alcaraz	Paraguay	DF	2007–2010	63	5	88	7	
Michael Almebäck	Sweden	DF	2011–2013	31	0	61	1	
Daniel Amokachi	Nigeria	FW	1990–1994	81	35	108	43	
Darko Anić	Serbia	MF	1997–1999	52	10	68	14	
Kurt Axelsson	Sweden	DF	1967–1973	119	4	119	4	
Carlos Bacca	Colombia	FW	2012–2013	27	22	54	31	
Gilbert Bailliu	Belgium	FW	1966–1970	71	32	87	42	
Boško Balaban	Croatia	FW	2003–2007	83	40	118	59	
Leen Barth	Netherlands	GK	1976–1981	63	0	75	0	
Fons Bastijns	Belgium	DF	1967–1981	400	9	400	9	
Luc Beyens	Belgium	FW	1983–1992	153	24	153	24	
Jonathan Blondel	Belgium	MF	2004–2015	170	10	266	19	
Boli Bolingoli-Mbombo	Belgium	MF	2013–	32	1	64	7	
Fernand Boone	Belgium	GK	1959–1970	278	0	307	1	
Foeke Booy	Netherlands	FW	1989–1993	110	50	146	63	
Vital Borkelmans	Belgium	DF	1989–2000	350	23	457	31	
Hugo Broos	Belgium	DF	1983–1988	161	1	202	1	
Kenneth Brylle Larsen	Denmark	FW	1986–1989	72	29	72	29	
Ludovic Butelle	France	GK	2016–	39	0	66	0	
Tomislav Butina	Croatia	GK	2003–2006	61	0	89	0	
Jan Ceulemans	Belgium	FW	1978–1992	405	191	501	240	
René Eijkelkamp	Netherlands	FW	1993–1995	53	14	67	19	
Frank Farina	Australia	FW	1988–1991	74	42	95	49	
Hubert Herssens	Belgium	FW	1953–1966	127	15	156	16	
Edgaras Jankauskas	Lithuania	MF	1997–2000	54	17	73	22	
Serge Kimoni	Belgium	DF	1987–1990	53	0	74	1	
Eduard Krieger	Austria	DF	1975–1978	88	10	126	14	
Urbain Lambert	Belgium	DF	1959–1963	76	0	76	0	
Ulrik le Fevre	Denmark	MF	1972–1977	143	34	184	43	
Nzelo Hervé Lembi	Democratic Republic of the Congo	DF	1995–2002	141	21	164	31	
Milan Lešnjak	Serbia	DF	1998–2003	47	2	67	2	
Walter Loske	Austria	FW	1963–1970	142	21	165	31	
Birger Maertens	Belgium	DF	2001–2008	162	1	224	1	
Gino Maes	Belgium	DF	1976–1982; 1984–1987	159	4	197	5	
Gilbert Marmenout	Belgium	DF	1962–1972	173	16	207	19	
Sandy Martens	Belgium	FW	1999–2004	131	36	175	47	
Dirk Medved	Belgium	DF	1993–1997	121	2	152	4	
Walter Meeuws	Belgium	DF	1978–1981	90	9	109	9	
Andrés Mendoza (Peruvian footballer)	Peru	FW	1999–2004	129	54	176	70	
John Moelaert	Belgium	DF	1966–1972	112	1	141	1	
Peter Nilsson (footballer)	Sweden	MF	1981–1984	77	6	88	6	
Paul Okon	Australia	DF	1991–1996	72	1	94	1	
Ivan Perišić	Croatia	MF	2009–2011	50	22	89	35	
Pascal Plovie	Belgium	DF	1982–1986; 1998–1996	155	3	155	3	
Brian Priske	Denmark	DF	2006–2008	64	0	81	0	
Alex Querter	Belgium	DF	1982–1993	250	33	250	33	
Dirk Ranson	Belgium	DF	1974–1982	49	0	56	1	
Lior Refaelov	Israel	MF	2011–	119	30	211	51	
Johan Renier	Belgium	DF	1981–1985	57	0	63	0	
Pascal Renier	Belgium	DF	1992–1998	110	2	150	3	
Jozef Rens	Belgium	DF	1964–1966	54	0	59	1	
Rob Rensenbrink	Netherlands	FW	1969–1971	55	23	73	36	
Nico Rijnders	Netherlands	MF	1971–1972	40	5	50	8	
Kevin Roelandts	Belgium	MF	2002–2006	49	3	72	5	
David Rozehnal	Czech Republic	DF	2003–2005	50	1	79	2	
Mathew Ryan	Australia	GK	2013–2015	57	0	102	0	
Bengt Sæternes	Norway	FW	2002–2004	40	14	61	18	
Dirk Sanders	Belgium	MF	1973–1978	92	2	115	2	
Koen Sanders	Belgium	MF	1980–1984	70	6	80	9	
Luc Sanders	Belgium	GK	1969–1974	126	0	154	0	
Gaby Savat	Belgium	DF	1952–1956; 1957–1968	206	1	220	1	
Marc Schaessens	Belgium	MF	1991–1993	42	5	53	7	
Ebrima Ebou Sillah	Gambia	FW	1997–1999; 2000–2002	41	5	55	7	
Jeroen Simaeys	Belgium	DF	2007–2011	95	9	138	12	
Josip Šimić	Croatia	FW	2000–2003	43	7	55	15	
Timmy Simons	Belgium	MF	2000–2005; 2013–	273	38	430	47	
Tim Smolders	Belgium	MF	2013–2015	63	10	88	12	
Waldemar Sobota	Poland	MF	2013–2015	33	3	51	7	
Robert Somers (footballer)	Belgium	MF	1959–1962	58	6	58	6	
Wesley Sonck	Belgium	FW	2007–2010	67	26	88	30	
Jan Sørensen	Denmark	FW	1977–1983	123	42	123	42	
Robert Špehar	Croatia	FW	1995–1997	50	41	64	48	
Ronald Spelbos	Netherlands	DF	1982–1984	62	10	62	10	
Marek Špilár	Slovenia	DF	2002–2005	31	0	53	0	
Lorenzo Staelens	Belgium	MF	1989–1998	286	74	375	108	
Mario Stanić	Croatia	MF	1995–1996	37	27	53	33	
Stijn Stijnen	Belgium	GK	2000–2011	145	0	208	0	
Alin Stoica	Romania	MF	2002–2005	34	6	54	7	
Roland Storme	Belgium	DF	1960–1964	86	0	88	0	
Antoni Szymanowski	Poland	DF	1981–1984	51	1	51	1	
Mamadou Tew	Senegal	DF	1984–1989	111	5	143	5	
Johnny Thio	Belgium	MF	1963–1975	291	109	345	126	
André Tierenteyn	Belgium	FW	1958–1965	97	21	100	22	
Thibaut Van Acker	Belgium	MF	2009–2013	26	0	51	0	
Franky Van der Elst	Belgium	MF	1984–1999	399	16	622	21	
Leo Van der Elst	Belgium	MF	1984–1988	64	30	64	30	
Peter Van der Heyden	Belgium	DF	2000–2005; 2010–2011	173	8	265	14	
Stéphane Van Der Heyden	Belgium	MF	1991–1996	130	16	170	22	
Elrio van Heerden	South Africa	MF	2006–2009	57	1	68	2	
Antoine Van Poelvoorde	Belgium	FW	1962–1965	68	27	73	30	
Dennis van Wijk	Netherlands	DF	1986–1989	56	5	72	6	
**Hans Vanaken**	Belgium	MF	2015–	55	13	99	23	
Philippe Vande Walle	Belgium	GK	1980–1990; 1999	124	0	124	0	
Erwin Vandendaele	Belgium	FW	1964–1974	253	12	313	14	
René Vandereycken	Belgium	MF	1973–1981	133	31	133	31	
Luc Vanwalleghem	Belgium	FW	1979–1986	105	9	105	9	
Ronald Vargas	Venezuela	MF	2008–2011	62	22	92	25	
Víctor Vázquez Solsona	Spain	MF	2011–2015	97	10	173	25	
Johnny Velkeneers	Belgium	DF	1971–1974	53	0	62	0	
Bernard Verheecke	Belgium	FW	1976–1980	81	18	106	25	
Stefan Vereycken	Belgium	MF	1984–1990	62	1	80	2	
Gert Verheyen	Belgium	FW	1992–2006	404	154	559	197	
René Verheyen	Belgium	MF	1983–1987	74	15	74	15	
Gunter Verjans	Belgium	MF	1995–1999	48	1	72	2	
Dany Verlinden	Belgium	GK	1988–2004	435	0	570	1	
Sven Vermant	Belgium	MF	1993–2001; 2005–2008	315	71	413	89	
Claude Verspaille	Belgium	DF	1990–1995	87	6	109	8	
Victor Simões	Brazil	FW	2004–2005	44	10	65	11	
Björn Vleminckx	Belgium	FW	2011–2013	33	9	54	15	
Jos Volders	Belgium	DF	1974–1982	107	2	107	2	
**Ruud Vormer**	Netherlands	MF	2014–	67	17	133	26	
Jelle Vossen	Belgium	FW	2015–2020	112	42	139	48	
Fernand Watteeuw	Belgium	MF	1959–1965	146	5	151	5	
Willy Wellens	Belgium	FW	1981–1986	122	56	122	56	
Jeanvion Yulu-Matondo	Belgium	FW	2005–2007	62	12	42	11	
Niki Zimling	Denmark	MF	2011–2013	36	2	56	4	

== C ==
- (Belgium) Robert Caenen (?)
- (Belgium) Eddy Caers (1974–1975)
- (Belgium) Charles Cambier (?)
- (Brazil) Marcos Camozzato (2010–)
- (Belgium) Brecht Capon (2001–2009)
- (Netherlands) Willy Carbo (June 1983 – December 1983)
- (Belgium) Berten Carels (1941–1956)
- (Belgium) Yves Carette (1981–1984)
- (Belgium) Pierre Carteus (1966–1974)
- (Slovenia) Nastja Čeh (2001–2005)
- (Belgium) Walter Ceulemans (1981–1983)
- (Peru) Daniel Chavez (2006–2010)
- (Belgium) Hans Christiaens (1989–1991)
- (Belgium) Laurent Ciman (2008–2009)
- (Belgium) Gert Claessens (1994–1999)
- (England) Ray Clarke (June 1979 – December 1979)
- (Belgium) Philippe Clement (1999–2009)
- (Belgium) Yvan Clicteur (1961–1963)
- (Belgium) Lei Clijsters (1973–1975)
- (Senegal) Antoine Coly (1984–1990)
- (Belgium) Julien Cools (1973–1979)
- (Belgium) Colin Coosemans (2010–)
- (Belgium) Lucien Coppens (1959–1960)
- (Belgium) Hans Cornelis (1999–2005)
- (Belgium) Rudi Cossey (1990–1995)
- (Belgium) Paul Courant (1976–1981)
- (Belgium) Francis Couvreur (1988–1991)
- (Belgium) Peter Creve (1986–1995)

== D ==
- (Belgium) Koen Daerden (2006 – December 2009)
- (France) Mohamed Dahmane (2009–2010)
- (France) Wilfried Dalmat (2010–)
- (Lithuania) Tomas Danilevičius (1996 – December 1997, January 1999 – 1999)
- (Belgium) Guy Dardenne (1981–1984)
- (Belgium) Raoul Daufresne de la Chevalerie (1908–1912)
- (Lithuania) Tomas Daumantas (1997–1998)
- (England) Roger Davies (June 1976 – November 1977)
- (Belgium) Louis Debackere (1957–1965)
- (Belgium) Eric De Baets (1977–1978)
- (Belgium) Alex De Block (1960–1961)
- (Belgium) Jacky Debougnoux (1979–1984)
- (Belgium) Tjörven De Brul (1994–2003)
- (Belgium) Glenn Decaestecker (1997–1999, 2000–2001)
- (Belgium) Dwight Decerf (1985–1986)
- (Belgium) Noël De Cock (1961–1966)
- (Belgium) Olivier De Cock (1987–2007)
- (Belgium) Björn De Coninck (1988–1998)
- (Belgium) Freddy De Coninck (1966–1972)
- (Belgium) Daniël De Cubber (1975–1979, 1981–1984)
- (Belgium) Eric Deflandre (1996–2000)
- (Belgium) Robert De Grande (1972–1975)
- (Belgium) Armand De Groote (1958–1962)
- (Belgium) Marc Degryse (1980–1989)
- (Belgium) Kurt De Laere (?-2003)
- (Belgium) Wim Delbaere (1981–1983)
- (Belgium) Gerard Delbeke (1923–1933)
- (Belgium) Fernand Delzongle (1959–1960)
- (Belgium) Gertjan De Mets (1997–2011)
- (Belgium) Erik De Mey (1970–1975)
- (Belgium) Willy De Mey (1970–1973)
- (Belgium) Georges Demoor (1967–1968)
- (Belgium) Norbert De Naeghel (1969–1977)
- (Belgium) Nicolas Denys (1999–2000)
- (Belgium) Werner Deprez (1966–1967)
- (Belgium) Jan De Ruyter (1988–1989)
- (Belgium) Gilbert Dermul (1972–1983)
- (Belgium) Fries Deschilder (2011–)
- (Belgium) Chris Desmet (1961–1966)
- (Belgium) Tom De Sutter (2001–2005)
- (Belgium) Stephane De Taeye (1973–1975)
- (Belgium) Robert Deurwaerder (1957–1966)
- (Belgium) Robert De Veen (?)
- (Belgium) Geert De Vlieger (2008–2011)
- (Belgium) Edmond De Vos (1956–1962)
- (Belgium) Geert De Vriendt (1972–1974)
- (Belgium) Johan Devrindt (1972–1974)
- (Belgium) Luc Devroe (1986–1988)
- (Belgium) Pascal De Wilde (1984–1985)
- (Belgium) Jimmy De Wulf (1991–2001, November 2001 – 2003)
- (Belgium) Sven Dhoest (2011–)
- (Burkina Faso) Maxime D'Hoore (1994–2000)
- (Senegal) Moustapha Diallo (2006–2007)
- (Costa Rica) Junior Diaz (2010–)
- (Morocco) Nabil Dirar (2008–)
- (Hungary) László Disztl (1989–1994)
- (Serbia) Dušan Đokić (2007–2010)
- (Belgium) Timothy Dreesen (2006–2009)
- (Brazil) José Duarte (2000–2003)
- (Belgium) Johan Dubois (1970–1971)
- (Belgium) Grégory Dufer (2005–2007)
- (Poland) Tomasz Dziubinski (1991–1995)
- (Iran) Armin Derhami (since 2019)

== E ==
- Elos Elonga Ekakia (1998–1999)
- (Belgium) Gaëtan Englebert (1999–2008)
- (Belgium) Bernt Evens (2008–2009)

== F ==
- (Senegal) Khalilou Fadiga (1997–2000)

== G ==
- (Netherlands) Hans Galjé (1990–1994)
- (Netherlands) Ruud Geels (1972–1974)
- (Belgium) Karel Geraerts (1998 – December 2003, 2007–)
- (Belgium) Hector "Torten" Goetinck (1902–1928)
- (Belgium) Henri Gogne (1976–1979)
- (Belgium) Willy Goossens (1967–1968)
- (Belgium) Fernand Goyvaerts (1956–1962)
- (Belgium) Jan Goyvaerts (1987–1988)
- (Netherlands) Rob Grüben (1979–1981)
- (Serbia) Ivan Gvozdenović (2003–2007)

== H ==
- (Belgium) Roland Haeyen (1964–1966)
- (Belgium) Pierre Havermaet (1964–1965)
- (Belgium) Roger Hermans (1972–1974)
- (Belgium) Sebastian Hermans (2001–2006)
- (Brazil) Wiver Hernandes (1994–1996)
- (Belgium) Marcel Herssens (?)
- (England) Brian Hill (1967–1968)
- (Belgium) Dirk Hinderyckx (1973–1977)
- (Belgium) Freddy Hinderyckx (1962–1972)
- (Belgium) Kurt Hinderyckx (1986–1989)
- (Belgium) Luc Hinderyckx (1980–1985)
- (Belgium) Carl Hoefkens (2009–)
- (Germany) Werner Hoffmann (1962–1963)
- (Switzerland) Konrad Holenstein (1975–1976)
- (Netherlands) Peter Houtman (November 1978 – May 1979)
- (Belgium) Henkie Houwaart jr. (1984–1988)
- (Netherlands) Henk Houwaart sr. (1969–1975)

== I ==
- (Ghana) Salou Ibrahim (2006–2008)
- (Serbia) Aleksandar Ilić (1997–2000)
- (Nigeria) Manasseh Ishiaku (January 2005 – 2007)

== J ==
- (Belgium) Alandson Jansen da Silva (2008)
- (Belgium) Alexandre Jansen Da Silva (2008)
- (Belgium) Jochen Janssen (1999 – December 2000)
- (United States) Jared Jeffrey (2008 – December 2009)
- (Denmark) Birger Jensen (1974–1988)

== K ==
- (Canada) Michael Klukowski (2005–2010)
- (Cameroon) Dorge Kouemaha (2009–)
- (Germany) Marc-André Kruska (2009)
- (Czech Republic) Stepan Kucera (2007–2010)
- (Serbia) Vladan Kujović (2011–)

== L ==
- (Belgium) Raoul "Lotte" Lambert (1956–1980)
- (Norway) Rune Lange (2001–2006)
- (Belgium) Georges Leekens (1972–1981)
- (Croatia) Ivan Leko (2005–2009)
- (Belgium) Yves Lenaerts (2006–2010)
- (Belgium) Benjamin Lutun (2004–2007)
- (Belgium) Maxime Lestienne (2010–)

== M ==
- (Belgium) Thomas Meunier (2011–)

== O ==
- (Belgium) Vadis Odjidja-Ofoe (2009–)

== P ==
- (Belgium) Désiré Paternoster (1901–1905 and 1908–1911)
- (Belgium) Lothaire Pierets (?)

== R ==
- (Belgium) José Reynaert (1938–1947)

== V ==
- (Belgium) Edgard Van Boxtaele (1907–1914)
- (Belgium) Emiel Van den Berghe (?)
- (Belgium) Léon Vandevoorde (?)
- (Belgium) Roger Vanhove (1930–1939)
- (Belgium) Marcel Van Vyve (?)
- (Belgium) Louis Versyp (?)
