= Baes =

Baes is a Dutch language surname. It may refer to:

- Aloysius Baes (1948–2006), a Filipino chemist
- Christine F. Baes, chair of the Department of Animal Biosciences at the University of Guelph in Ontario, Canada
- Dominique Baes (1893–1918), a Belgian footballer
- Émile Baes (1879–1953), a Belgian painter
- Firmin Baes (1874–1943), a Belgian painter
- Jean Baes (1848–1914), a Belgian architect
- Jonas Baes (born 1961), a Filipino composer
- Lionel Baes (1839–1913), a Belgian painter
- Louis Baes (1899–1992), a Belgian footballer
- Martin Baes (fl. 1604–1637), a Flemish engraver and printmaker
- Omer Baes (1889–1929), a Belgian footballer
- Rachel Baes (1912–1983), a Belgian painter
