= 1991–92 European Cup Winners' Cup =

Tournament details
- Dates: 21 August 1991 – 6 May 1992
- Teams: 34

Final positions
- Champions: (Germany) Werder Bremen (1st title)
- Runners-up: (France) Monaco

Tournament statistics
- Matches played: 65
- Goals scored: 166 (2.55 per match)
- Attendance: 1,049,884 (16,152 per match)
- Top scorer(s): Péter Lipcsei (Ferencváros); 6 goals

The 1991–92 season of the European Cup Winners' Cup was won by Werder Bremen in the final against Monaco. Both were first-time finalists in the competition.

Defending champions Manchester United were eliminated by Atlético Madrid in the second round.

== Teams ==
A total of 34 teams participated in the competition.

Qualified teams for 1991–92 European Cup Winners' Cup
First round
| (England) Manchester United^{TH} | (Germany) Werder Bremen (CW) | (Italy) Roma (CW) | (Spain) Atlético Madrid (CW) |
| (Belgium) Club Brugge (CW) | (Portugal) Porto (CW) | (France) Monaco (CW) | (Soviet Union) CSKA Moscow (CW) |
| (Netherlands) Feyenoord (CW) | (Romania) Bacău (CR) | (Scotland) Motherwell (CW) | (Sweden) Norrköping (CW) |
| (Socialist Federal Republic of Yugoslavia) Hajduk Split (CW) | (Germany) Stahl Eisenhüttenstadt (CR) | (Switzerland) Sion (CW) | (Czechoslovakia) Baník Ostrava (CW) |
| (Finland) Ilves (CW) | (Wales) Swansea City (CW) | (Bulgaria) Levski Sofia (CW) | (Greece) Athinaikos (CR) |
| (Hungary) Ferencváros (CW) | (Poland) GKS Katowice (CW) | (Turkey) Galatasaray (CW) | (Albania) Partizani Tirana (CW) |
| (Norway) Fyllingen (CR) | (Cyprus) Omonia (CW) | (Northern Ireland) Glenavon (CR) | (Iceland) Valur (CW) |
| (Malta) Valletta (CW) | (Luxembourg) Jeunesse Esch (CR) | | |
Qualifying round
| (Austria) Stockerau (CW) | (Denmark) Odense (CW) | (Republic of Ireland) Galway United (CW) | (England) Tottenham Hotspur (CW) |

Notes

1. Germany (GER): The original slot allocation of the former West/East Germany still applied. Werder Bremen qualified as winners of the 1990–91 DFB-Pokal, while Stahl Eisenhüttenstadt qualified as runners-up of the 1990–91 NOFV-Pokal (as Hansa Rostock won the double and qualified for the European Cup). Due to the reunification of Germany in October 1990, all flags show Germany instead of West/East Germany. However, Stahl Eisenhüttenstadt matches and their records were still counted for East Germany, and not for Germany, under UEFA regulations.

== Qualifying round ==
| Team 1 | Agg. | Team 2 | 1st leg | 2nd leg |
|---|---|---|---|---|
| Stockerau (Austria) | 0–2 | (England) Tottenham Hotspur | 0–1 | 0–1 |
| Galway United (Republic of Ireland) | 0–7 | (Denmark) Odense | 0–3 | 0–4 |

=== First leg ===
21 August 1991
18:30

| Stockerau (Austria) | 0–1 | (England) Tottenham Hotspur |
|---|---|---|
| | Report | Durie 39' |

Praterstadion, Vienna
Attendance: 15,500
Referee: Gérard Biguet (France)

21 August 1991
15:30

| Galway United (Republic of Ireland) | 0–3 | (Denmark) Odense |
|---|---|---|
| | Report | Donnerup 38'; Nedergaard 46'; Elstrup 68' |

Ballinderreen GAA, Ballinderreen
Attendance: 4,750
Referee: Egil Nervik (Norway)

=== Second leg ===
3 September 1991
19:00

| Odense (Denmark) | 4–0 | (Republic of Ireland) Galway United |
|---|---|---|
| Nedergaard 35'; Hansen 51'; Harder 81'; Thorup 90' | Report |

Odense Stadion, Odense
Attendance: 1,757
Referee: Zygmunt Ziober (Poland)

Odense won 7–0 on aggregate.

4 September 1991
19:45

| Tottenham Hotspur (England) | 1–0 | (Austria) Stockerau |
|---|---|---|
| Mabbutt 42' | Report |

White Hart Lane, London
Attendance: 28,072
Referee: Michel Piraux (Belgium)

Tottenham Hotspur won 2–0 on aggregate.

== First round ==
| Team 1 | Agg. | Team 2 | 1st leg | 2nd leg |
|---|---|---|---|---|
| Fyllingen (Norway) | 2–8 | (Spain) Atlético Madrid | 0–1 | 2–7 |
| Athinaikos (Greece) | 0–2 | (England) Manchester United | 0–0 | 0–2 (aet) |
| GKS Katowice (Poland) | 3–3 (a) | (Scotland) Motherwell | 2–0 | 1–3 |
| Omonia (Cyprus) | 0–4 | (Belgium) Club Brugge | 0–2 | 0–2 |
| Bacău (Romania) | 0–11 | (Germany) Werder Bremen | 0–6 | 0–5 |
| Levski Sofia (Bulgaria) | 3–7 | (Hungary) Ferencváros | 2–3 | 1–4 |
| Stahl Eisenhüttenstadt (Germany) | 1–5 | (Turkey) Galatasaray | 1–2 | 0–3 |
| Odense (Denmark) | 1–4 | (Czechoslovakia) Baník Ostrava | 0–2 | 1–2 |
| Glenavon (Northern Ireland) | 4–4 (a) | (Finland) Ilves | 3–2 | 1–2 |
| CSKA Moscow (Soviet Union) | 2–2 (a) | (Italy) Roma | 1–2 | 1–0 |
| Norrköping (Sweden) | 6–1 | (Luxembourg) Jeunesse Esch | 4–0 | 2–1 |
| Swansea City (Wales) | 1–10 | (France) Monaco | 1–2 | 0–8 |
| Valur (Iceland) | 1–2 | (Switzerland) Sion | 0–1 | 1–1 |
| Partizani Tirana (Albania) | 0–1 | (Netherlands) Feyenoord | 0–0 | 0–1 |
| Hajduk Split (Socialist Federal Republic of Yugoslavia) | 1–2 | (England) Tottenham Hotspur | 1–0 | 0–2 |
| Valletta (Malta) | 0–4 | (Portugal) Porto | 0–3 | 0–1 |

=== First leg ===
17 September 1991

| Glenavon (Northern Ireland) | 3–2 | (Finland) Ilves |
|---|---|---|
| Ferguson 32'; McBride 60' (pen.); Conville 80' | Report | J. Aaltonen 12'; Dziadulewicz 78' |

Mourneview Park, Lurgan
Attendance: 2,029
Referee: Marnix Sandra (Belgium)

17 September 1991

| Swansea City (Wales) | 1–2 | (France) Monaco |
|---|---|---|
| Legg 71' | Report | Passi 8' (pen.); Rui Barros 27' |

Vetch Field, Swansea
Attendance: 6,208
Referee: Kim Milton Nielsen (Denmark)

17 September 1991

| Valur (Iceland) | 0–1 | (Switzerland) Sion |
|---|---|---|
| | Report | Rey 80' |

Laugardalsvöllur, Reykjavík
Attendance: 761
Referee: Svend Christensen (Denmark)

17 September 1991

| Hajduk Split (Socialist Federal Republic of Yugoslavia) | 1–0 | (England) Tottenham Hotspur |
|---|---|---|
| Novaković 53' | Report |

Linzer Stadion, Linz (Note: Match was played in Austria since UEFA suspended Yugoslav teams from playing their home matches in Yugoslavia due to the deteriorating security situation in the country that eventually turned into the Yugoslav Wars.)
Attendance: 7,000
Referee: Kurt Röthlisberger (Switzerland)

18 September 1991

| Fyllingen (Norway) | 0–1 | (Spain) Atlético Madrid |
|---|---|---|
| | Report | Manolo 28' |

Brann Stadion, Bergen
Attendance: 4,333
Referee: Keith Burge (Wales)

18 September 1991

| Athinaikos (Greece) | 0–0 | (England) Manchester United |
|---|---|---|
| | Report |

Leoforos Alexandras Stadium, Athens
Attendance: 5,647
Referee: Aron Schmidhuber (Germany)

18 September 1991

| GKS Katowice (Poland) | 2–0 | (Scotland) Motherwell |
|---|---|---|
| Szewczyk 42'; Wolny 81' | Report |

Stadion GKS Katowice, Chorzów
Attendance: 3,700
Referee: Einar Halle (Norway)

18 September 1991

| Omonia (Cyprus) | 0–2 | (Belgium) Club Brugge |
|---|---|---|
| | Report | Dziubiński 3'; Booy 48' |

Makario Stadium, Nicosia
Attendance: 10,300
Referee: Plarent Kotherja (Albania)

18 September 1991

| Bacău (Romania) | 0–6 | (Germany) Werder Bremen |
|---|---|---|
| | Report | Rufer 9', 13', 31'; Bratseth 63'; Votava 78'; Neubarth 80' |

Stadionul Municipal, Bacău
Attendance: 4,500
Referee: Jozef Marko (Czechoslovakia)

18 September 1991

| Levski Sofia (Bulgaria) | 2–3 | (Hungary) Ferencváros |
|---|---|---|
| Dartilov 36'; Bankov 90' | Report | Deszatnik 7'; Lipcsei 72', 81' |

Stadion Georgi Asparuhov, Sofia
Attendance: 8,147
Referee: Gheorghe Constantin (Romania)

18 September 1991

| Stahl Eisenhüttenstadt (Germany) | 1–2 | (Turkey) Galatasaray |
|---|---|---|
| F. Bartz 40' | Report | Kosecki 45'; Keser 71' |

Sportanlage der Hüttenwerker, Eisenhüttenstadt
Attendance: 3,420
Referee: Jaap Uilenberg (Netherlands)

18 September 1991

| Odense (Denmark) | 0–2 | (Czechoslovakia) Baník Ostrava |
|---|---|---|
| | Report | Škarabela 41'; Časko 82' |

Odense Stadion, Odense
Attendance: 2,377
Referee: Cees Bakker (Netherlands)

18 September 1991

| CSKA Moscow (Soviet Union) | 1–2 | (Italy) Roma |
|---|---|---|
| Sergeyev 52' | Report | Fokin 46' (o.g.); Rizzitelli 73' |

Central Lenin Stadium, Moscow
Attendance: 35,000
Referee: Bo Karlsson (Sweden)

18 September 1991

| Norrköping (Sweden) | 4–0 | (Luxembourg) Jeunesse Esch |
|---|---|---|
| Karlsson 45'; J. Eriksson 49'; Hellström 70'; Vaattovaara 71' (pen.) | Report |

Norrköpings Idrottspark, Norrköping
Attendance: 2,438
Referee: Esa Palsi (Finland)

18 September 1991

| Partizani Tirana (Albania) | 0–0 | (Netherlands) Feyenoord |
|---|---|---|
| | Report |

Qemal Stafa Stadium, Tirana
Attendance: 4,000
Referee: Sándor Puhl (Hungary)

19 September 1991

| Valletta (Malta) | 0–3 | (Portugal) Porto |
|---|---|---|
| | Report | Kostadinov 28'; Timofte 37' (pen.); Mihtarski 78' |

National Stadium, Ta' Qali
Attendance: 1,129
Referee: Gerd Grabher (Austria)

=== Second leg ===
1 October 1991

| Werder Bremen (Germany) | 5–0 | (Romania) Bacău |
|---|---|---|
| Kohn 6', 17'; Eilts 9'; Bratseth 66'; Bode 71' | Report |

Weserstadion, Bremen
Attendance: 3,021
Referee: Patrick Kelly (Republic of Ireland)

Werder Bremen won 11–0 on aggregate.

1 October 1991

| Monaco (France) | 8–0 | (Wales) Swansea City |
|---|---|---|
| Weah 6', 85'; Fofana 18'; Rui Barros 30'; Passi 31', 89'; Harris 39' (o.g.); Djorkaeff 75' | Report |

Stade Louis II, Monaco
Attendance: 5,520
Referee: Serge Muhmenthaler (Switzerland)

Monaco won 10–1 on aggregate.

2 October 1991

| Atlético Madrid (Spain) | 7–2 | (Norway) Fyllingen |
|---|---|---|
| Schuster 4', 89'; Manolo 19', 34' (pen.), 86'; Soler 40'; Futre 81' | Report | Tengs 54', 68' |

Estadio Vicente Calderón, Madrid
Attendance: 19,600
Referee: Freddy Philippoz (Switzerland)

Atlético Madrid won 8–2 on aggregate.

2 October 1991

| Manchester United (England) | 2–0 (a.e.t.) | (Greece) Athinaikos |
|---|---|---|
| Hughes 109'; McClair 111' | Report |

Old Trafford, Manchester
Attendance: 35,023
Referee: Rosario Lo Bello (Italy)

Manchester United won 2–0 on aggregate.

2 October 1991

| Motherwell (Scotland) | 3–1 | (Poland) GKS Katowice |
|---|---|---|
| Kirk 29', 89'; Cusack 86' | Report | Rzeźniczek 68' |

Fir Park, Motherwell
Attendance: 10,032
Referee: Bernd Heynemann (Germany)

3–3 on aggregate; GKS Katowice won on away goals.

2 October 1991

| Club Brugge (Belgium) | 2–0 | (Cyprus) Omonia |
|---|---|---|
| Booy 65'; Van der Heyden 85' | Report |

Olympiastadion, Bruges
Attendance: 11,885
Referee: John Purcell (Republic of Ireland)

Club Brugge won 4–0 on aggregate.

2 October 1991

| Ferencváros (Hungary) | 4–1 | (Bulgaria) Levski Sofia |
|---|---|---|
| Lipcsei 1', 90'; Albert 28'; Deszatnik 57' | Report | Dimitrov 73' |

Üllői úti Stadion, Budapest
Attendance: 8,591
Referee: Yusuf Namoğlu (Turkey)

Ferencváros won 7–3 on aggregate.

2 October 1991

| Galatasaray (Turkey) | 3–0 | (Germany) Stahl Eisenhüttenstadt |
|---|---|---|
| Kosecki 20' (pen.); Arif 67'; Yücedağ 87' | Report |

Ali Sami Yen Stadium, Istanbul
Attendance: 14,528
Referee: Luben Spasov (Bulgaria)

Galatasaray won 5–1 on aggregate.

2 October 1991

| Baník Ostrava (Czechoslovakia) | 2–1 | (Denmark) Odense |
|---|---|---|
| Chýlek 82'; Steffensen 83' (o.g.) | Report | Bordinggaard 8' |

Bazaly, Ostrava
Attendance: 2,596
Referee: Daniel Roduit (Switzerland)

Baník Ostrava won 4–1 on aggregate.

2 October 1991

| Ilves (Finland) | 2–1 | (Northern Ireland) Glenavon |
|---|---|---|
| Mattila 39' (pen.), 70' | Report | McBride 78' |

Tampere Stadium, Tampere
Attendance: 3,358
Referee: Henning Lund-Sørensen (Denmark)

4–4 on aggregate; Ilves won on away goals.

2 October 1991

| Roma (Italy) | 0–1 | (Soviet Union) CSKA Moscow |
|---|---|---|
| | Report | Dmitriyev 13' |

Stadio Olimpico, Rome
Attendance: 45,086
Referee: Hubert Forstinger (Austria)

2–2 on aggregate; Roma won on away goals.

2 October 1991

| Jeunesse Esch (Luxembourg) | 1–2 | (Sweden) Norrköping |
|---|---|---|
| Marinelli 83' | Report | J. Eriksson 2'; Kindvall 40' |

Stade de la Frontière, Esch-sur-Alzette
Attendance: 765
Referee: Hans Reygwart (Netherlands)

Norrköping won 6–1 on aggregate.

2 October 1991

| Sion (Switzerland) | 1–1 | (Iceland) Valur |
|---|---|---|
| Orlando 78' | Report | Einarsson 67' |

Stade de Tourbillon, Sion
Attendance: 6,100
Referee: José Veiga Trigo (Portugal)

Sion won 2–1 on aggregate.

2 October 1991

| Feyenoord (Netherlands) | 1–0 | (Albania) Partizani Tirana |
|---|---|---|
| Bosz 87' | Report |

De Kuip, Rotterdam
Attendance: 20,146
Referee: Rune Pedersen (Norway)

Feyenoord won 1–0 on aggregate.

2 October 1991

| Tottenham Hotspur (England) | 2–0 | (Socialist Federal Republic of Yugoslavia) Hajduk Split |
|---|---|---|
| Tuttle 6'; Durie 14' | Report |

White Hart Lane, London
Attendance: 24,297
Referee: Erik Fredriksson (Sweden)

Tottenham Hotspur won 2–1 on aggregate.

2 October 1991

| Porto (Portugal) | 1–0 | (Malta) Valletta |
|---|---|---|
| Timofte 90' | Report |

Estádio das Antas, Porto
Attendance: 15,000
Referee: Antonio Martín Navarrete (Spain)

Porto won 4–0 on aggregate.

== Second round ==
| Team 1 | Agg. | Team 2 | 1st leg | 2nd leg |
|---|---|---|---|---|
| Atlético Madrid (Spain) | 4–1 | (England) Manchester United | 3–0 | 1–1 |
| GKS Katowice (Poland) | 0–4 | (Belgium) Club Brugge | 0–1 | 0–3 |
| Werder Bremen (Germany) | 4–2 | (Hungary) Ferencváros | 3–2 | 1–0 |
| Galatasaray (Turkey) | 2–2 (a) | (Czechoslovakia) Baník Ostrava | 0–1 | 2–1 |
| Ilves (Finland) | 3–6 | (Italy) Roma | 1–1 | 2–5 |
| Norrköping (Sweden) | 1–3 | (France) Monaco | 1–2 | 0–1 |
| Sion (Switzerland) | 0–0 (3–5 p) | (Netherlands) Feyenoord | 0–0 | 0–0 (aet) |
| Tottenham Hotspur (England) | 3–1 | (Portugal) Porto | 3–1 | 0–0 |

=== First leg ===
22 October 1991

| Norrköping (Sweden) | 1–2 | (France) Monaco |
|---|---|---|
| Hellström 22' | Report | Mendy 18'; Weah 48' |

Norrköpings Idrottspark, Norrköping
Attendance: 4,627
Referee: Hans-Peter Dellwing (Germany)

23 October 1991

| Atlético Madrid (Spain) | 3–0 | (England) Manchester United |
|---|---|---|
| Futre 32', 87'; Manolo 88' | Report |

Estadio Vicente Calderón, Madrid
Attendance: 35,000
Referee: Bernd Heynemann (Germany)

23 October 1991

| GKS Katowice (Poland) | 0–1 | (Belgium) Club Brugge |
|---|---|---|
| | Report | Staelens 22' |

Stadion GKS Katowice, Chorzów
Attendance: 3,856
Referee: Hasan Ceylan (Turkey)

23 October 1991

| Werder Bremen (Germany) | 3–2 | (Hungary) Ferencváros |
|---|---|---|
| Neubarth 28', 40'; Allofs 33' | Report | Lipcsei 35', 73' |

Weserstadion, Bremen
Attendance: 7,502
Referee: David Syme (Scotland)

23 October 1991

| Galatasaray (Turkey) | 0–1 | (Czechoslovakia) Baník Ostrava |
|---|---|---|
| | Report | Ollender 68' |

Ali Sami Yen Stadium, Istanbul
Attendance: 20,586
Referee: José Rosa dos Santos (Portugal)

23 October 1991

| Ilves (Finland) | 1–1 | (Italy) Roma |
|---|---|---|
| Czakon 65' | Report | Carnevale 20' |

Tampere Stadium, Tampere
Attendance: 8,727
Referee: Michał Listkiewicz (Poland)

23 October 1991

| Sion (Switzerland) | 0–0 | (Netherlands) Feyenoord |
|---|---|---|
| | Report |

Stade de Tourbillon, Sion
Attendance: 9,111
Referee: Jozef Marko (Czechoslovakia)

23 October 1991

| Tottenham Hotspur (England) | 3–1 | (Portugal) Porto |
|---|---|---|
| Lineker 14', 82'; Durie 32' | Report | Kostadinov 52' |

White Hart Lane, London
Attendance: 23,621
Referee: Zoran Petrović (Yugoslavia)

=== Second leg ===
5 November 1991

| Monaco (France) | 1–0 | (Sweden) Norrköping |
|---|---|---|
| Robert 26' | Report |

Stade Louis II, Monaco
Attendance: 6,000
Referee: Rosario Lo Bello (Italy)

Monaco won 3–1 on aggregate.

6 November 1991

| Manchester United (England) | 1–1 | (Spain) Atlético Madrid |
|---|---|---|
| Hughes 4' | Report | Schuster 68' |

Old Trafford, Manchester
Attendance: 39,654
Referee: Guy Goethals (Belgium)

Atlético Madrid won 4–1 on aggregate.

6 November 1991

| Club Brugge (Belgium) | 3–0 | (Poland) GKS Katowice |
|---|---|---|
| Verspaille 50'; Staelens 58'; Schaessens 78' | Report |

Olympiastadion, Bruges
Attendance: 14,428
Referee: Keith Burge (Wales)

Club Brugge won 4–0 on aggregate.

6 November 1991

| Ferencváros (Hungary) | 0–1 | (Germany) Werder Bremen |
|---|---|---|
| | Report | Bode 48' |

Üllői úti Stadion, Budapest
Attendance: 20,000
Referee: Einar Halle (Norway)

Werder Bremen won 4–2 on aggregate.

6 November 1991

| Baník Ostrava (Czechoslovakia) | 1–2 | (Turkey) Galatasaray |
|---|---|---|
| Ollender 31' | Report | Yusuf 41'; Kosecki 44' (pen.) |

Bazaly, Ostrava
Attendance: 3,250
Referee: Mircea Salomir (Romania)

2–2 on aggregate; Galatasaray won on away goals.

6 November 1991

| Roma (Italy) | 5–2 | (Finland) Ilves |
|---|---|---|
| Giannini 1'; Rizzitelli 3'; Di Mauro 15'; Carnevale 48', 77' | Report | Czakon 80', 89' |

Stadio Olimpico, Rome
Attendance: 24,810
Referee: Charles Agius (Malta)

Roma won 6–3 on aggregate.

6 November 1991

| Feyenoord (Netherlands) | 0–0 (a.e.t.) | (Switzerland) Sion |
|---|---|---|
| | Report |
Penalties
| Metgod (penalty scored); Sabău (penalty scored); Fraser (penalty scored); De Wolf (penalty scored); Bosz (penalty scored) | 5–3 | (penalty scored) Calderón; (penalty missed) Sauthier; (penalty scored) Geiger; (penalty scored) Baljić |

De Kuip, Rotterdam
Attendance: 24,408
Referee: Kim Milton Nielsen (Denmark)

0–0 on aggregate; Feyenoord won 5–3 on penalties.

7 November 1991

| Porto (Portugal) | 0–0 | (England) Tottenham Hotspur |
|---|---|---|
| | Report |

Estádio das Antas, Porto
Attendance: 45,000
Referee: Peter Mikkelsen (Denmark)

Tottenham Hotspur won 3–1 on aggregate.

== Quarter-finals ==
| Team 1 | Agg. | Team 2 | 1st leg | 2nd leg |
|---|---|---|---|---|
| Atlético Madrid (Spain) | 4–4 (a) | (Belgium) Club Brugge | 3–2 | 1–2 |
| Werder Bremen (Germany) | 2–1 | (Turkey) Galatasaray | 2–1 | 0–0 |
| Roma (Italy) | 0–1 | (France) Monaco | 0–0 | 0–1 |
| Feyenoord (Netherlands) | 1–0 | (England) Tottenham Hotspur | 1–0 | 0–0 |

=== First leg ===
4 March 1992

| Atlético Madrid (Spain) | 3–2 | (Belgium) Club Brugge |
|---|---|---|
| Schuster 30'; Toni 47'; Futre 57' | Report | Verspaille 31'; Beyens 43' |

Estadio Vicente Calderón, Madrid
Attendance: 38,000
Referee: Bruno Galler (Switzerland)

4 March 1992

| Werder Bremen (Germany) | 2–1 | (Turkey) Galatasaray |
|---|---|---|
| Kohn 79'; Bester 85' | Report | Kosecki 33' |

Weserstadion, Bremen
Attendance: 33,000
Referee: Michał Listkiewicz (Poland)

4 March 1992

| Roma (Italy) | 0–0 | (France) Monaco |
|---|---|---|
| | Report |

Stadio Olimpico, Rome
Attendance: 40,336
Referee: Antonio Martín Navarrete (Spain)

4 March 1992
19:00

| Feyenoord (Netherlands) | 1–0 | (England) Tottenham Hotspur |
|---|---|---|
| Kiprich 56' | Report |

De Kuip, Rotterdam
Attendance: 44,000
Referee: Pierluigi Pairetto (Italy)

=== Second leg ===
18 March 1992

| Club Brugge (Belgium) | 2–1 | (Spain) Atlético Madrid |
|---|---|---|
| Querter 40' (pen.); Booy 62' | Report | Futre 10' |

Olympiastadion, Bruges
Attendance: 22,000
Referee: Rune Larsson (Sweden)

4–4 on aggregate. Club Brugge won on away goals.

18 March 1992

| Galatasaray (Turkey) | 0–0 | (Germany) Werder Bremen |
|---|---|---|
| | Report |

Ali Sami Yen Stadium, Istanbul
Attendance: 27,357
Referee: Kim Milton Nielsen (Denmark)

Werder Bremen won 2–1 on aggregate.

18 March 1992

| Monaco (France) | 1–0 | (Italy) Roma |
|---|---|---|
| Rui Barros 45' | Report |

Stade Louis II, Monaco
Attendance: 21,000
Referee: John Blankenstein (Netherlands)

Monaco won 1–0 on aggregate.

18 March 1992

| Tottenham Hotspur (England) | 0–0 | (Netherlands) Feyenoord |
|---|---|---|
| | Report |

White Hart Lane, London
Attendance: 29,834
Referee: Kurt Röthlisberger (Switzerland)

Feyenoord won 1–0 on aggregate.

== Semi-finals ==
| Team 1 | Agg. | Team 2 | 1st leg | 2nd leg |
|---|---|---|---|---|
| Club Brugge (Belgium) | 1–2 | (Germany) Werder Bremen | 1–0 | 0–2 |
| Monaco (France) | 3–3 (a) | (Netherlands) Feyenoord | 1–1 | 2–2 |

=== First leg ===
1 April 1992

| Club Brugge (Belgium) | 1–0 | (Germany) Werder Bremen |
|---|---|---|
| Amokachi 5' | Report |

Olympiastadion, Bruges
Attendance: 21,000
Referee: Luben Spasov (Bulgaria)

1 April 1992

| Monaco (France) | 1–1 | (Netherlands) Feyenoord |
|---|---|---|
| Valéry 26' | Report | Witschge 9' |

Stade Louis II, Monaco
Attendance: 18,000
Referee: Brian McGinlay (Scotland)

=== Second leg ===
15 April 1992

| Werder Bremen (Germany) | 2–0 | (Belgium) Club Brugge |
|---|---|---|
| Bode 31'; Bockenfeld 59' | Report |

Weserstadion, Bremen
Attendance: 35,000
Referee: Howard King (Wales)

Werder Bremen won 2–1 on aggregate.

15 April 1992

| Feyenoord (Netherlands) | 2–2 | (France) Monaco |
|---|---|---|
| Witschge 52'; Damaschin 88' | Report | Weah 34'; Rui Barros 50' |

De Kuip, Rotterdam
Attendance: 42,107
Referee: Rune Larsson (Sweden)

3–3 on aggregate. Monaco won on away goals.

== Final ==
6 May 1992
19:15

| Monaco (France) | 0–2 | (Germany) Werder Bremen |
|---|---|---|
| | Report | Allofs 41'; Rufer 54' |

Estádio da Luz, Lisbon
Attendance: 11,054
Referee: Pietro D'Elia (Italy)

== Top scorers ==
The top scorers from the 1991–92 UEFA Cup Winners' Cup are as follows:

| Rank | Name | Team | Goals |
|---|---|---|---|
| 1 | (Hungary) Péter Lipcsei | (Hungary) Ferencváros | 6 |
| 2 | (Portugal) Paulo Futre | (Spain) Atlético Madrid | 5 |
| 2 | (Spain) Manolo | (Spain) Atlético Madrid | 5 |
| 4 | (Portugal) Rui Barros | (France) Monaco | 4 |
| 4 | (Poland) Roman Kosecki | (Turkey) Galatasaray | 4 |
| 4 | (New Zealand) Wynton Rufer | (Germany) Werder Bremen | 4 |
| 4 | (Germany) Bernd Schuster | (Spain) Atlético Madrid | 4 |
| 4 | (Liberia) George Weah | (France) Monaco | 4 |
| 9 | (Germany) Marco Bode | (Germany) Werder Bremen | 3 |
| 9 | (Netherlands) Foeke Booy | (Belgium) Club Brugge | 3 |
| 9 | (Italy) Andrea Carnevale | (Italy) Roma | 3 |
| 9 | (Scotland) Gordon Durie | (England) Tottenham Hotspur | 3 |
| 9 | (Germany) Stefan Kohn | (Germany) Werder Bremen | 3 |
| 9 | (Bulgaria) Emil Kostadinov | (Portugal) Porto | 3 |
| 9 | (Germany) Frank Neubarth | (Germany) Werder Bremen | 3 |
| 9 | (France) Gérald Passi | (France) Monaco | 3 |

== See also ==
- 1991–92 European Cup
- 1991–92 UEFA Cup
