= Mester =

Mester is a surname. Notable people with the name include:

- Đula Mešter (born 1972), Serbian volleyball player of Hungarian ethnicity
- Endre Mester (1903–1984), Hungarian pioneer of laser medicine
- Jorge Mester (born 1935), Mexican conductor of Hungarian ancestry
- Loretta Mester (born 1958), American President and CEO of the Federal Reserve Bank of Cleveland
- Mathias Mester (born 1986), German Paralympian athlete
- Milan Mešter (born 1975), Montenegrin football manager and former player
- Zuzana Mesterová (born 1989), Slovak politician

== See also ==
- Meester
- Little mester, a self-employed worker who rents space in a factory or works from their own workshop
- Semester, an academic term (or simply term) or portion of an academic year, during which an educational institution holds classes
- Trimester (disambiguation), a period of three months
