= Meester =

Meester is a surname. Notable people with the surname include:

- Brad Meester (born 1977), American football player
- Leighton Meester (born 1986), American actress, singer, songwriter and model
- Veronique Meester (born 1995), Dutch rower

Meester is also known as the name of the White House Easter Bunny. Ursula Meese, the wife of the Attorney General Edwin Meese used to dress up as what is known as the "Meester Bunny" during Ronald Reagan time.

== See also ==
- De Meester, a surname
- Mester, a surname
- Cooper v Die Meester, an important case in South African property law
- Meester Cornelis, a former name of Jatinegara, a district of East Jakarta, Indonesia
- Meester Kikker, is a 2016 Dutch family film directed by Anna van der Heide
