= Ajao (disambiguation) =

Ajao is a settlement in Kenya.

Ajao or AJAO may also refer to:

- Muisi Ajao (born 1978), Nigerian footballer
- Adrian Russell Ajao (1964–2017), perpetrator of the 2017 Westminster attack
- Juvenile Arthritis Organization (AJAO), a membership group of the Arthritis Foundation
