= Zbyněk Ollender =

Czech footballer

Personal information
- Date of birth: 12 April 1966 (age 60)
- Place of birth: Ostrava, Czechoslovakia
- Position: Striker

Senior career*
Years	Team	Apps	(Gls)
1984–1989	Baník Ostrava	49	(3)
1989–1990	→ RH Cheb (loan)	15	(3)
1990–1992	Baník Ostrava	49	(15)
1992–1993	SKP Hradec Králové	18	(0)
1993–1994	EPA Larnaca	17	(3)
Total		148	(24)
- * Club domestic league appearances and goals as of 8 November 2009

Zbyněk Ollender (born 12 April 1966) is a Czech businessman and retired football player.

== Club career ==
Born in Ostrava, Ollender played most of his career for local outfit Baník Ostrava. After spending most of the 1989/1990 season on loan at RH Cheb he returned to Baník only to end his career in Cyprus after a season at SKP Hradec Králové.

He played both legs of Baník's 1990–91 UEFA Cup defeat by Aston Villa and he scored both goals for Baník against Galatasaray in the 1991–92 European Cup Winners' Cup.

== D-Sport ==
After retiring as a player, Ollender became a successful businessman and owner of D-Sport sports store chain. He opened his first store in the center of Ostrava in 1994.

== Honours ==
- Czechoslovak Cup: 1

1991
