= Eric Buyse =

Belgian footballer and manager

Personal information
- Full name: Eric Buyse
- Date of birth: 27 March 1940
- Place of birth: Lauwe, Belgium
- Date of death: 26 April 2019 (aged 79)
- Place of death: Sint-Michiels, Belgium
- Positions: Midfielder; forward

Youth career
- 1952–1959: WS Lauwe

Senior career*
Years	Team	Apps	(Gls)
- WS Lauwe
1959–1970	Cercle Brugge	253	(49)
1970–1972	VG Oostende		
1972–1976	Excelsior Zedelgem		

Managerial career
- 1970–1972: VG Oostende
- 1972–1976: Excelsior Zedelgem
- 1976–1978: Cercle Brugge (youth coach)
- 1978–1984: Cercle Brugge (assistant manager)
- 1985–1986: Excelsior Zedelgem
- * Club domestic league appearances and goals as of 24 October 2009 ‡ National team caps and goals as of 24 October 2009

Eric Buyse (27 March 1940 – 26 April 2019) was a Belgian football player. He played as left-footed forward, and midfielder in a later stage of his career.

== Career ==
Buyse played most of his career for Cercle Brugge; a successful era. He won second division in 1961 and third division in 1968. He also became twice top scorer of the team, and has until today scored the 10th most goals for Cercle.

After his career with the green and black Bruges side, Buyse became player-coach of VG Oostende after the VG Oostende coach quickly was fired in the 1970–71 season. Buyse remained player-coach until 1976, the last 4 years with West Flanders lower league side Excelsior Zedelgem.

After his playing career, Buyse returned to Cercle Brugge. He eventually quit football with a short managerial spell at Exc. Zedelgem.

== Death ==
Buyse died in April 2019, aged 79.

Sporting positions
Preceded by (Belgium) Gilbert Bailliu	Cercle Brugge top scorer 1966–1967^{1}^{1}alongside Roger Blieck	Succeeded by (Belgium) Roger Blieck
