= De Meester =

De Meester is a surname. Notable people with the surname include:

- Hans De Meester (born 1970), Belgian cyclist
- Luca de Meester (born 2004), German footballer
- Marie Louise De Meester (1857–1928), Belgian missionary and founder of the Missionary Sisters of the Immaculate Heart of Mary
- Sam de Meester (born 1982), footballer
- Theo de Meester (1851–1919), Dutch politician (prime minister) and economist
  - De Meester cabinet
