= Jackie De Caluwé =

Belgian footballer (1934–2021)

Personal information
- Full name: Jacques De Caluwé
- Date of birth: 6 March 1934
- Place of birth: Bruges, Belgium
- Date of death: 20 September 2021 (aged 87)
- Positions: Defender; midfielder

Youth career
- Cercle Brugge

Senior career*
| Years | Team | Apps | (Gls) |
| 1952–1966 | Cercle Brugge | 340 | (30) |
| 1966–1970 | SV Loppem | | |

Managerial career
- 1966–1970: SV Loppem
- 1970–1972: FC Eeklo
- 1972–1973: SV Blankenberge
- 1973–1974: Cercle Brugge (assistant)
- 1974–1975: Exc. Zedelgem
- 1975–1976: SV Loppem
- 1976–1978: SV Koekelare
- * Club domestic league appearances and goals

Jackie De Caluwé (6 March 1934 – 20 September 2021) was a footballer who played most of his career for Cercle Brugge.

De Caluwé is the player with the 5th highest all-time appearances for Cercle.

After playing his first ten seasons for Cercle in the Belgian lower leagues, in 1961–62 he made his Belgian Division One debut, and Cercle remained in the top flight for the rest of De Caluwe's career with them.

He ended his career as player-coach with lower division side SV Loppem.
