= Albert Van Coile =

Belgian footballer

Personal information
- Date of birth: 27 March 1900
- Place of birth: Bruges, Belgium
- Date of death: 4 April 1927 (aged 27)
- Place of death: Bruges, Belgium
- Position: Defender

Youth career
- Cercle Brugge

Senior career*
Years	Team	Apps	(Gls)
1919–1927	Cercle Brugge	178	(26)

International career
1926	Belgium	1	(0)
- * Club domestic league appearances and goals

Albert Van Coile (27 March 1900 – 4 April 1927) was a Belgian footballer. He played for Cercle Brugge. He also appeared once for the Belgium national football team.

Van Coile is especially remembered by the Cercle Brugge fans because he is the only player who died because of injuries sustained in a Cercle Brugge match. During a tournament in Tourcoing, Van Coile was playing as centre forward. In the match against US Tourcoing, he collided with the local goalkeeper. Van Coile suffered no visible injuries, but when his situation deteriorated the day after the match, doctors discovered a tear in his bowels. A speedy operation had no result. Van Coile died on 4 April.

His funeral received great attention in the media as well as in Bruges itself, where all the flags were lowered to half-staff in his honour. Van Coile's team, Cercle Brugge, were on the verge of becoming national champions in 1927 and did in fact win their second national championship a few months later, on the penultimate matchday of the season, with a thrilling 6–5 win over Daring Bruxelles. Tragically, during Van Coile's funeral, Cercle's chairman René de Peellaert caught pneumonia, of which he died 14 days later.
