= Zdenko Vukasović =

Croatian footballer (1941–2021)

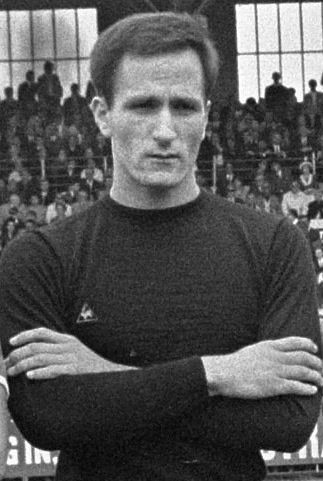

Personal information
- Date of birth: 19 September 1941
- Place of birth: Split, Italian Empire
- Date of death: 27 May 2021 (aged 79)
- Position: Goalkeeper

Senior career*
| Years | Team | Apps | (Gls) |
| 1959–1963 | RNK Split | | |
| 1963–1965 | Hajduk Split | | |
| 1966–1967 | La Gantoise | 28 | (0) |
| 1967–1969 | Anderlecht | 8 | (0) |
| 1969–1972 | Cercle Brugge | 84 | (1) |
| 1972–1975 | Lokeren | 54 | (0) |
- * Club domestic league appearances and goals as of 22 January 2023

Zdenko Vukasović (19 September 1941 – 27 May 2021) was a Croatian professional footballer who played as a goalkeeper.

== Career ==
Born in Split, Vukasović played for RNK Split, Hajduk Split, La Gantoise, Anderlecht, Cercle Brugge and Lokeren.

Vukasović played in 50 matches for Hajduk and, as it was not allowed to leave Yugoslavia before the age of 28, he was helped by a masseur to move abroad to Belgium, aged 24.

He played 28 matches for La Gantoise, where he succeeded club legend Mance Seghers but was relegated to the second tier. He then had two seasons at Belgian's second level and one back in the top tier with Cercle Brugge.

== Death ==
Vukasović died on 27 May 2021, at the age of 79.
