= Trimester =

Trimester or Trimestre may refer to:

- Academic term, a trimester system divides the academic year into three terms
- Trimester (pregnancy) in humans, where the time of pregnancy is divided into three terms of 13 weeks to refer to the fetus's development
- A period of three months (Latin tri +mensis=month or moon) In Europe, where financial years start on 1 January each year, often Jan+Feb+Mar etc.

== See also ==
- The trimester framework in Roe v. Wade
- Semester
- Term (disambiguation)
