= Arthur Ruysschaert =

Belgian footballer

Personal information
- Full name: Arthur Ruysschaert
- Date of birth: 21 February 1910
- Place of birth: Bruges, Belgium
- Date of death: 10 January 1995 (aged 84)
- Place of death: Bruges, Belgium
- Position: Forward

Youth career
- Cercle Brugge

Senior career*
| Years | Team | Apps | (Gls) |
| 1926–1944 | Cercle Brugge | 365 | (105) |
- VG Oostende

International career^{‡}
| | Belgium | 0 | (0) |

Managerial career
- Cercle Brugge (youth coach)
- 1953–1954: Cercle Brugge (ad interim)
- * Club domestic league appearances and goals as of 21 June 2008 ‡ National team caps and goals as of 21 June 2008

Arthur Ruysschaert (born 21 February 1910 in Bruges – died 10 January 1995 in Bruges) was a Belgian footballer who played as a striker.

Ruysschaert made his debut at the highest level of Belgian football on 18 April 1926, when he played with Cercle Brugge in a 3–2 home win against RSC Anderlecht. With Cercle he won the league twice (1927, 1930), the cup once (1927) and the second division once (1938).

Arthur Ruysschaert is the only player who has the top 10 most appearances ever for Cercle Brugge as well as is in the list of the top 10 highest goals scorers for the club.

He ended his career with Belgian coast side VG Oostende. After his footballing career, Ruysschaert became youth coach at Cercle Brugge. He also became the interim manager of Cercle during the 1953–54 season because of the suspension of Louis Versyp.

Sporting positions
| Preceded by (Belgium) Alphonse Decorte (Belgium) Roger Proot | Cercle Brugge top scorer 1934–1935^{1}^{1}alongside Maurice Blieck and Willy Van Loo | Succeeded by (Belgium) Maurice Blieck |
