= Roger Claeys =

Belgian footballer and coach

Personal information
- Full name: Roger Claeys
- Date of birth: 6 March 1924
- Place of birth: Sint-Michiels, Bruges, Belgium
- Date of death: 20 January 2016 (aged 91)
- Position: Midfielder

Youth career
- Cercle Brugge

Senior career*
| Years | Team | Apps | (Gls) |
| 1939–1957 | Cercle Brugge | 354 | (46) |
| 1957–1959 | SK Roeselare | | |

Managerial career
- 1957–1959: SK Roeselare
- * Club domestic league appearances and goals as of 3 February 2008 ‡ National team caps and goals as of 3 February 2008

Roger Claeys (6 March 1924 – 20 January 2016) was a Belgian football player. Claeys was usually fielded as midfielder. Apart from playing football, Claeys worked as a butcher.

Claeys made his début for the first team of Cercle Brugge at the age of 14 in a match against VG Oostende. This was only an unofficial début, as the match was played in an emergency competition, organised due to World War II. He scored the winning goal: 2–1. The other goal was scored Marcel Vanhalme, age 15 at that time, and just like Claeys only called up for the first team due to injuries.

Claeys would make his official début against Lierse on 14 September 1941 in a 0–1 loss. Roger Claeys is the player with the 4th most appearances for Cercle Brugge. He would also be captain of the team for a long time.

Claeys scored his first official goal in 1943 in a 2-7 surprise win over Standard Liège. Claeys was the direct opponent of Jean Capelle, his football teen idol.

After his Cercle Brugge career, Claeys became player-coach of SK Roeselare. He would remain in this position for two seasons, when he quit football.
