= Didier Frenay =

Belgian footballer

Personal information
- Date of birth: 9 April 1966 (age 60)
- Place of birth: Belgium
- Position: Midfielder

Senior career*
Years	Team	Apps	(Gls)
-1987	Royal Football Club Seraing		
1987-1994	Cercle Brugge K.S.V.	187+	(10+)
1994-1995/96	R. Charleroi S.C.	12+	(1+)
1995/96-1997	FC Linz	24+	(0+)
1997/1998	S.C. Eendracht Aalst	1	(0)
1997/98-1998/99	AS Cannes	9+	(1+)
1998/99-1999/00	SK Vorwärts Steyr	18	(0)
1999/2000	K.S.V. Roeselare		
2007-2008	KGR Katelijne		
- * Club domestic league appearances and goals

Didier Frenay (born 9 April 1966 in Belgium) is a Belgian retired footballer.
