= Bernard Beuken =

Belgian footballer

Personal information
- Full name: Bernard Beuken
- Date of birth: 8 February 1971 (age 55)
- Position: Defender

Youth career
- Blegny

Senior career*
Years	Team	Apps	(Gls)
1988–1992	Standard Liège (Note: 90/91 season appearances and goals only)	15	(0)
1992–1994	Cercle Brugge	48	(0)
1995–1996	Cercle Brugge	26	(1)
1996	Malmö FF	10	(0)
- * Club domestic league appearances and goals

Bernard Beuken (born 8 February 1971) is a retired Belgian footballer who played as a defender.
