= André Saeys =

Belgian footballer (1911–1988)

Personal information
- Full name: André Saeys
- Date of birth: 20 February 1911
- Place of birth: Sint-Andries (Bruges), Belgium
- Date of death: 22 March 1988 (aged 77)
- Place of death: Sint-Andries (Bruges), Belgium
- Position: Striker

Youth career
- Cercle Brugge

Senior career*
Years	Team	Apps	(Gls)
1928–1935	Cercle Brugge	154	(53)
1935–1936	RRC Wetteren-Kwatrecht		
1936–1941	Beerschot		
1941–1942	Cercle Brugge	18	(2)

International career^{‡}
1933–1942	Belgium	9	(1)
- * Club domestic league appearances and goals as of 20 June 2008 ‡ National team caps and goals as of 20 June 2008

André Saeys (born 20 February 1911 in Sint-Andries - 22 March 1988 in Sint-Andries) was a Belgian football player. He was a striker. He played numerous seasons at the highest level of Belgian football and was also capped 9 times for Belgium.

Saeys made his debut for Cercle Brugge in 1928 in a match against Berchem Sport. Cercle won the match 0–2. He won the league with Cercle one season later.

In 1935, André Saeys went to RC Wetteren, where he would stay one season. Beerschot became Saeys's next team. With the purple-white Antwerp side, Saeys won the league again twice, in 1938 and 1939.

Saeys made his debut for Belgium in a match against the Netherlands on 9 April 1933. Belgium lost the match 1–3. Saeys made the Belgian goal.
