= Eric Daels =

Belgian footballer (born 1936)

Personal information
- Full name: Eric Daels
- Date of birth: 4 August 1936
- Place of birth: Wevelgem, Belgium
- Position: Forward

Youth career
- SV Wevelgem

Senior career*
Years	Team	Apps	(Gls)
- SV Wevelgem
1960–1965	Cercle Brugge	98	(34)
1965–1966	Excelsior Mouscron		
1966–1969	WS Lauwe		
1969–1972	SV Moorsele		
1972–1973	KEG Gistel		
1973–1974	HO Wingene		
1974–1975	KWS Houthulst		

International career^{‡}
	Belgium	0	(0)

Managerial career
- 1969–1972: SV Moorsele
- 1972–1973: KEG Gistel
- 1973–1974: HO Wingene
- 1974–1975: KWS Houthulst
- 1977–1979: FC Knokke
- 1979–1981: Club Roeselare
- 1981–1982: Daring Ruddervoorde
- 1982–1984: FC Moerkerke
- 1984–1985: SC Beernem
- 1985–1986: FC Varsenare
- * Club domestic league appearances and goals as of 24 October 2009 ‡ National team caps and goals as of 24 October 2009

Eric Daels (born 4 August 1936 in Wevelgem, West Flanders) is a retired Belgian footballer.

== Career ==
Daels started playing football at the age of 14 with his local team SV Wevelgem. He soon made fame as a speedy forward. Daels was discovered by Club Brugge in a match against Wevelgem. Club got a hard time winning, and afterwards, Club Brugge coach Lucien Masyn insisted on the recruitment of Eric Daels in the blue and black ranks. However, the Club Brugge board considered the transfer fee too high. A few season later, Daels got his transfer to Bruges: Cercle Brugge bought the player. Daels made his debut for Cercle against White Star in a 3–1 home victory. He had an important role in Cercle winning Belgian Second Division that season.

Daels was transferred to Excelsior Mouscron after the 1964–65 season, a transfer Daels actually did not want. After 1 season at Mouscron and 3 seasons with White Star Lauwe, he became player-coach for SV Moorsele, KEG Gistel, HO Wingene and KWS Houthulst. After Daels quit his playing career, he became manager for FC Knokke, Club Roeselare, Daring Ruddervoorde, FC Moerkerke, SC Beernem and FC Varsenare.

Sporting positions
Preceded by (Belgium) Gilbert Bailliu	Cercle Brugge top scorer 1963–1964	Succeeded by (Belgium) Gilbert Bailliu
