= Christine F. Baes =

Christine F. Baes is a Canadian geneticist and Professor in the Ontario Agricultural College (OAC) at the University of Guelph, where she holds a Canada Research Chair in Livestock Genomics and serves as Associate Dean of External Relations. She chaired the Department of Animal Biosciences from 2023 to 2024.

With colleagues including Flavio Schenkel of the University of Guelph and Filippo Miglior of Lactanet, she helped lay the groundwork for the genetic evaluation that made Canada the first country to publish national genetic evaluations for methane emissions in dairy cattle.

== Early life and education ==
Baes grew up in Southwestern Ontario on her family's dairy farm near Stratford. She completed a Bachelor of Science (Honours) in Animal Science at the University of Guelph in 2004, including exchanges at Moscow State University and the University of Hohenheim, followed by a Master of Science in Agriculture at Hohenheim in 2005 and a Doctorate specializing in Quantitative Genetics at the Leibniz Institute for Farm Animal Biology (FBN) and the University of Kiel in 2008.

== Career ==
Baes began teaching at the University of Hohenheim in 2009 and lectured part-time at ETH Zurich from 2012. In June 2015 she joined the University of Guelph as the Semex–Canadian Dairy Network–Holstein Canada Professor in Dairy Genomics, and in 2019 she was named Canada Research Chair in Livestock Genomics. After chairing the Department of Animal Biosciences from 2023 to 2024, she became Associate Dean of External Relations for the OAC. She is also an adjunct professor of animal breeding at the Institute of Genetics in the Vetsuisse Faculty of the University of Bern.

== Research ==
Baes applies quantitative genetics and genomic data to animal breeding, with work spanning dairy and beef cattle, swine, goats, turkeys and horses.

=== Dairy cattle ===
With Paul Stothard, Ronaldo Cerri and Marc-André Sirard, she co-led the Resilient Dairy Genome Project, funded through Genome Canada's 2018 Large-Scale Applied Research Project competition and launched in 2019. Building on the earlier Efficient Dairy Genome Project, it expanded the focus from feed efficiency and methane to include fertility and health traits, and involved more than 30 collaborators and 35 international partner organizations. Its aim was a more resilient cow, able to adapt to changing environmental conditions without losing productivity, health or fertility, selected through an index combining fertility, health, feed efficiency and methane emission traits, with project data flowing directly to Lactanet, Canada's national genetic evaluation organization.

Together with Flavio Schramm-Schenkel and Saeed Shadpour of the University of Guelph, Filippo Miglior of Lactanet and Francesca Malchiodi of Semex, she helped develop methodology to predict individual cows' methane emissions from routine milk samples using mid-infrared spectroscopy, which became the basis of the methane efficiency trait. Lactanet added the trait to its national evaluations in 2023, following its 2021 launch of evaluations for feed efficiency, making Canada the first country with a national genetic evaluation for methane emissions.

Since 2023 she has co-led Leveraging Genomics to Achieve Dairy Net Zero with Filippo Miglior, Rachel Gervais and Paul Stothard, one of nine Interdisciplinary Challenge Teams in Genome Canada's Climate-Smart Agriculture and Food Systems initiative. The project, with a budget of about $16.2 million, combines genomics and nutrition to produce a roadmap for reducing greenhouse gas emissions from dairy production, in support of the sector's pledge to reach net zero by 2050.

With funding from Dairy Farmers of Canada and its partners, she has also led a study of how new genomic technologies affect breeding strategies for genetic progress in Canadian dairy cattle (2018–2022) and, within Dairy Research Cluster 4, funded by Agriculture and Agri-Food Canada and dairy-sector partners, a project to develop a national strategy for identifying and managing harmful genetic mutations in the Canadian dairy herd (2023–2028).

=== Poultry ===
She led Application of genomic selection in turkeys for health, welfare, efficiency and production traits, a $6 million project launched in 2017 under Genome Canada's Genomic Applications Partnership Program in partnership with Hybrid Turkeys, a Hendrix Genetics company. Targeting feed efficiency, body weight, yield, egg production and livability in commercial turkeys, the project increased the accuracy of genomic evaluations by 30 to 60 per cent compared with conventional methods.

=== Swine ===
In Switzerland, Baes worked on breeding against boar taint, the off-odour in meat from uncastrated male pigs caused mainly by the compounds androstenone and skatole, as a genetic alternative to the surgical castration of piglets.

Her work has been covered by CBC News, The Atlantic, The Walrus and The Wall Street Journal, among others.

== Professional service ==
Baes was president of the Canadian Society of Animal Science around 2019–2020. She serves as a technical expert on Lactanet's Genetic Evaluation Board, which oversees Canada's national dairy cattle genetic evaluations, and as an external member of Holstein Canada's Breed Improvement Committee. Internationally, she is a member of the Feed and Gas Working Group of the International Committee for Animal Recording (ICAR), which sets guidelines for recording feed intake and methane emissions for genetic evaluation. She also sits on the jury of the Agricultural Methane Reduction Challenge, a $12 million Agriculture and Agri-Food Canada prize competition to accelerate solutions for reducing methane emissions from cattle.

== Awards and recognition ==
- 2015: Semex–Canadian Dairy Network–Holstein Canada Professorship in Dairy Genomics
- 2019: Canada Research Chair in Livestock Genomics
- 2021: Ontario Minister's Award of Excellence in Innovation and Entrepreneurship
- 2023: University of Guelph Innovation of the Year Award (with Flavio Schenkel, Saeed Shadpour, Filippo Miglior and Francesca Malchiodi), for genetic selection to reduce methane emissions in dairy cattle
- 2024: J. L. Lush Award in Animal Breeding, American Dairy Science Association
- 2024: National Turkey Federation Research Award, Poultry Science Association
- 2025: Canadian Society of Animal Science Award for Technical Innovation in Enhancing Production of Safe Affordable Food
