= Michel Sauthier =

Swiss footballer (born 1966)

Personal information
- Date of birth: 17 February 1966 (age 60)
- Position: Defender

Senior career*
Years	Team	Apps	(Gls)
1985–1993	FC Sion		
1993–1995	Servette FC		

International career
1992	Switzerland	1	(0)

Managerial career
- July–September 2008: Servette FC
- * Club domestic league appearances and goals

Michel Sauthier (born 17 February 1966) is a retired Swiss football defender.

== Honours ==
=== Player ===
FC Sion

- Swiss Championship: 1991–92
- Swiss Cup: 1985–86, 1990–91
