= Maurice Blieck =

Belgian footballer

Personal information
- Full name: Maurits Blieck
- Date of birth: 19 April 1913
- Place of birth: Bruges, Belgium
- Date of death: 25 July 1977 (aged 64)
- Place of death: Bruges, Belgium
- Position: Forward

Youth career
- 1926–1933: Cercle Brugge

Senior career*
Years	Team	Apps	(Gls)
1933–1936	Cercle Brugge	37	(21)
1936–1938	Eendracht Aalst		
1938–1944	SK Geraardsbergen		
1944–1946	SK Roeselare		
1946–1953	FC Torhout		
1953–1955	SC Beernem		
- * Club domestic league appearances and goals as of 24 October 2009 ‡ National team caps and goals as of 24 October 2009

Maurits (Maurice) Blieck (19 April 1913 – 25 July 1977) was a Belgian football player. He used to be a forward.

== Career ==
Blieck made his debut at the highest level of Belgian football in the 1933–34 season, in a 4–0 home win against Tilleur. Blieck scored twice. In his next two seasons for Cercle Brugge, Blieck would become team top scorer. His son Roger would later also become top scorer twice for Cercle.

Maurice Blieck moved to Eendracht Aalst in 1936, when Cercle were relegated to second division. Aalst were also playing at that level. After his two seasons at Aalst, Blieck played for SK Geraardsbergen, Club Roeselare, FC Torhout and SC Beernem.

Sporting positions
Preceded by (Belgium) Arthur Ruysschaert	Cercle Brugge top scorer 1935^{1} – 1936^{1}alongside Arthur Ruysschaert and Willy Van Loo	Succeeded by (Belgium) Johan Vandenabeele
