= Émile Baes =

Belgian painter, pastel artist, draughtsman and writer

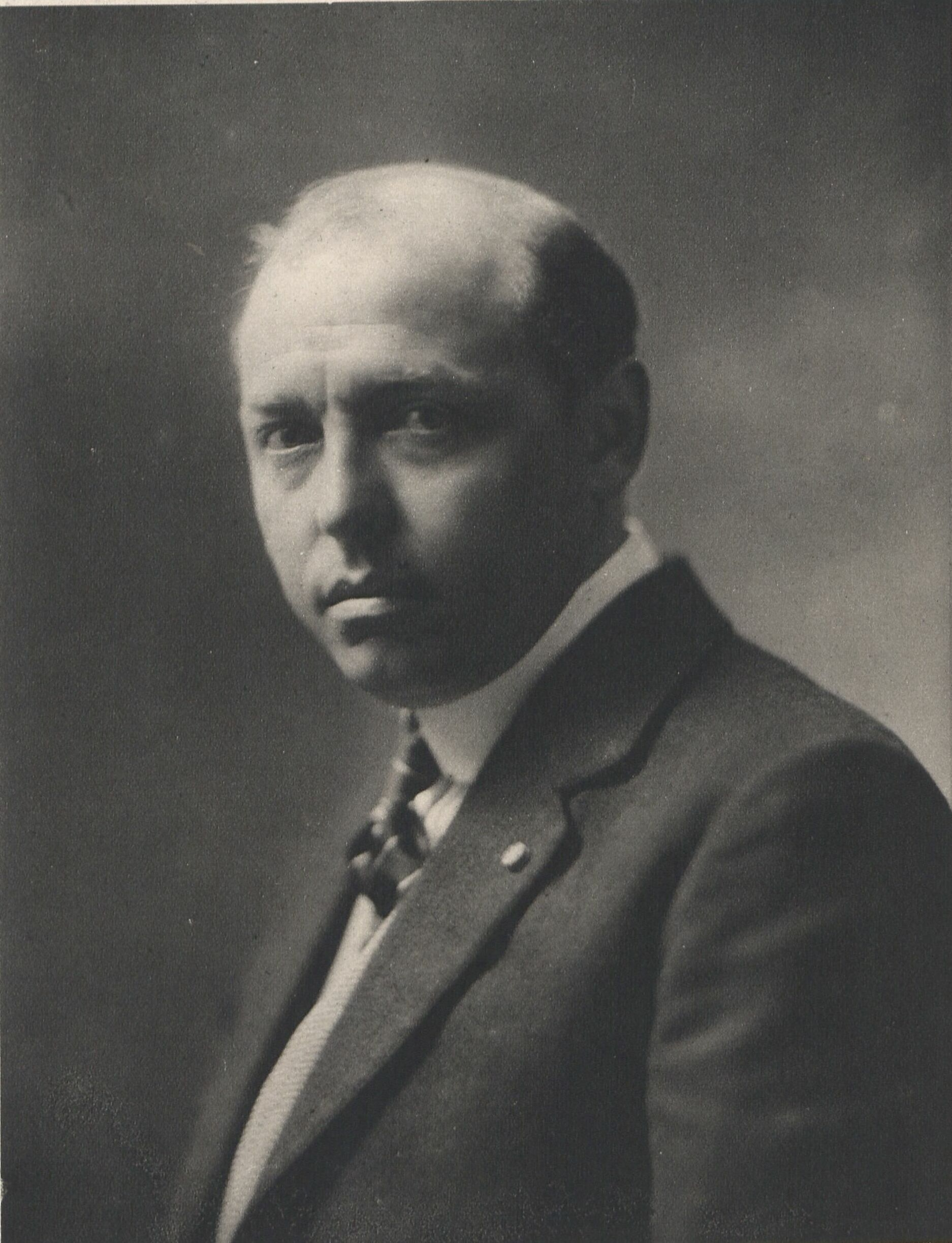
Portrait of Émile Baes

Émile Baes or Emile Baes, full name Emile Charles Robert Baes (12 November 1879 – 3 January 1953) was a Belgian painter, pastel artist, draughtsman, printmaker, illustrator, art historian and writer. His range of subject matter was wide and included nudes, interiors with elegant women, genre scenes, history paintings, portraits, Orientalist scenes, landscapes and still lifes. He worked in a Post-Impressionist style, suited to his eroticised boudoir and bedroom scenes. He was skilled in the pastel technique and produced a number of etchings. He published in 1912 La physionomie du Christ dans l'art (The facial appearance of Christ in art), an art historical work on the representation of Christ's body throughout art history. He further published in 1948 a limited edition book with his own illustrations under the title Les Dieux sadiques (The Sadistic Gods). He illustrated works of contemporary writers such as Marcel Kienné de Msafeot's L'Abbé chez les nudistes (The priest visits the nudists) published in 1947.

== Life ==
Baes was born in Brussels as the son of Charles (Ghislaine Constantin) Baes and Héléne Marie Gomber. His father, originally from Lokeren, was a metal engraver and glass painter who operated a stained glass factory. Héléne Marie Gomber, originally from Menen, was his father's second wife, as his first wife Philomène Van Linden had died in 1876.

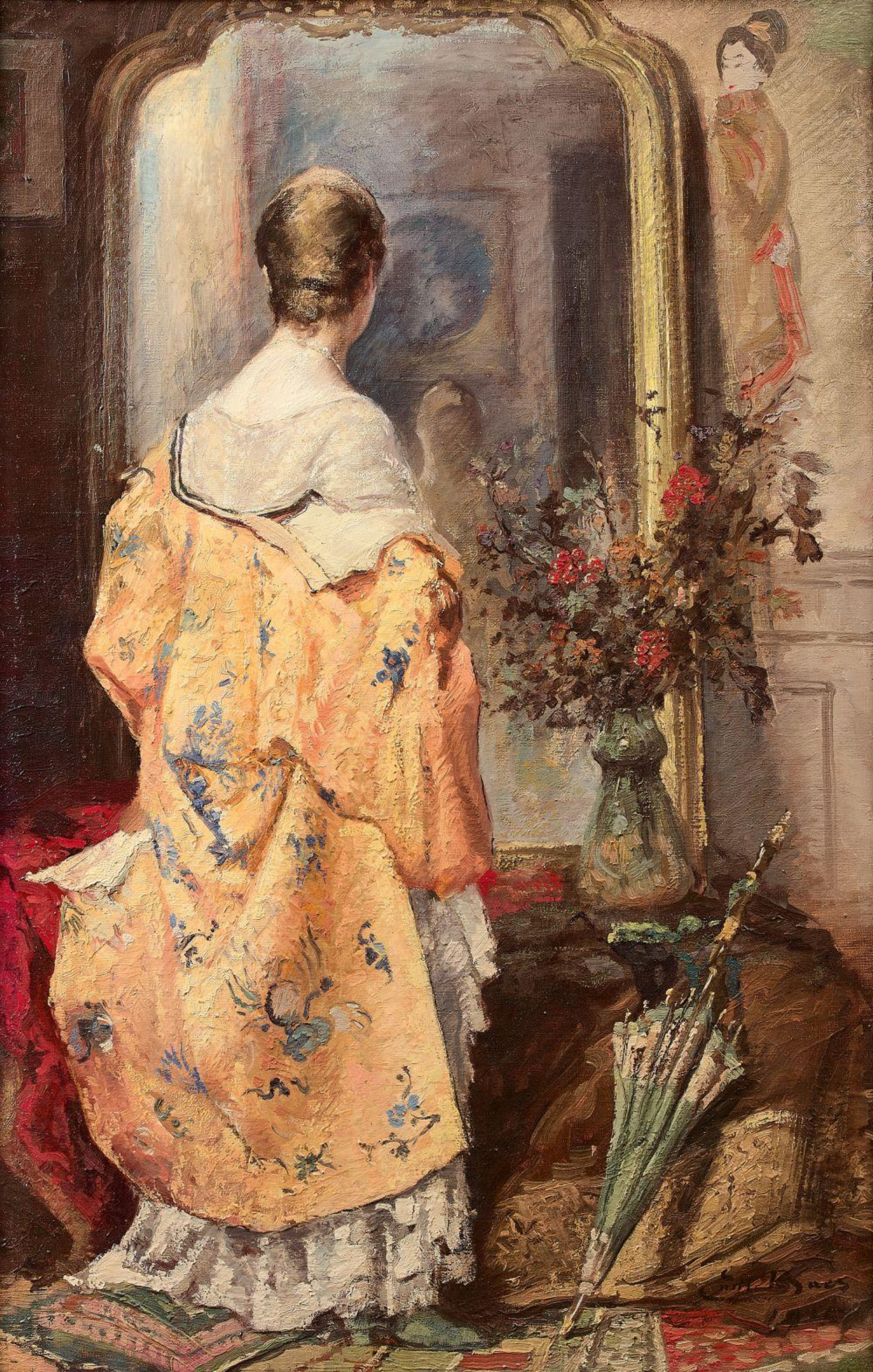
Young woman before a mirror

He studied at the Royal Academy of Fine Arts in Brussels where the Neoclassicist painter Joseph Stallaert was one of his teachers. He later studied in Paris with Alexandre Cabanel, an exponent of the French Academic tradition and Léon Bonnat, a naturalist portrait painter.

He married Maria Françoise Andréa Furnelle on 30 December 1903 in Saint-Gilles. Their daughter Rachel born in 1912 became a prominent Surrealist painter.

A successful artist, Baes was able to acquire in 1918 a residence with two artist studios designed in the Belgian Art nouveau style by the architect Alban Chambon located on the fashionable rue de la Réforme in Ixelles. The house had previously belonged to the painter Géo Bernier. From 1920 to 1940, he held each Sunday a salon to which he invited his friends from the local and art circles even when he was spending more and more time in Paris. He was held in high esteem by King Albert I of Belgium and was invited to make multiple portraits of the King. On 23 January 1929, he was made an Officer or Knight of the Order of Leopold of Belgium.

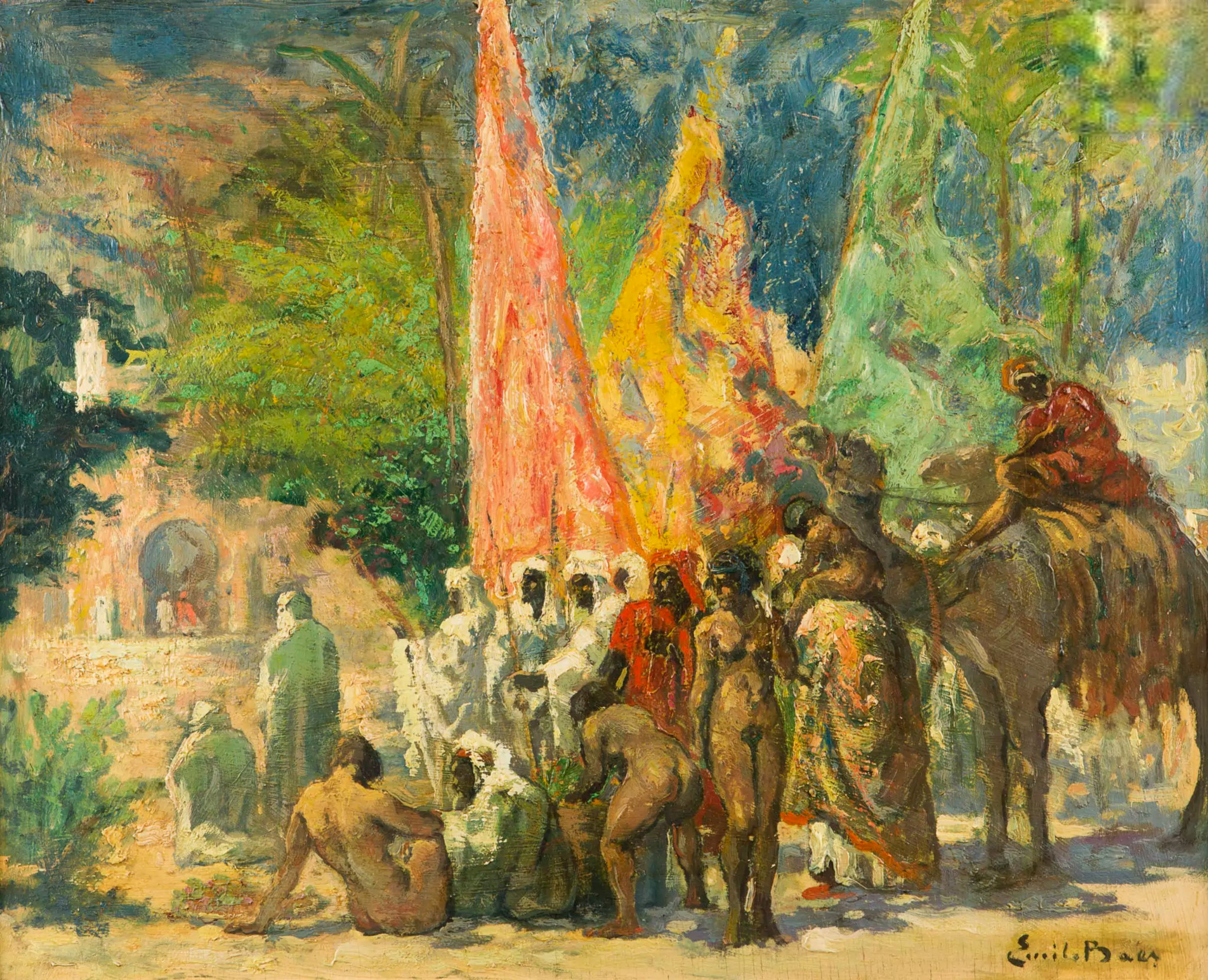
The slave trader

Baes exhibited his works in the main capitals of Europe, notably in Paris, where the portrait of King Albert I of Belgium, of whom he was the personal painter, can be seen at the Musée des Invalides. The presentation of this painting, which he donated to France, took place on 3 December 1932, during a ceremony presided over by the President of France. He also travelled to Morocco and Egypt where he found the inspiration for his Orientalist works.

Baes maintained strong connections with France and spent large periods of his life in Paris. He was a member of the Société des gens de lettres in Paris and became a Grand Officier of the Légion d'Honneur of France. He was a gold medallist at the Paris Salon and a member of the Institut de France. At the end of 1935 he was a member of a large delegation which sailed to Martinique to commemorate the 300th anniversary of the incorporation of the French West Indies by France. He served as a jury member for Miss France in 1936, a fact which highlights his connection to broader cultural circles. He died in the 16th arrondissement of Paris on 3 January 1953.

== Art works ==
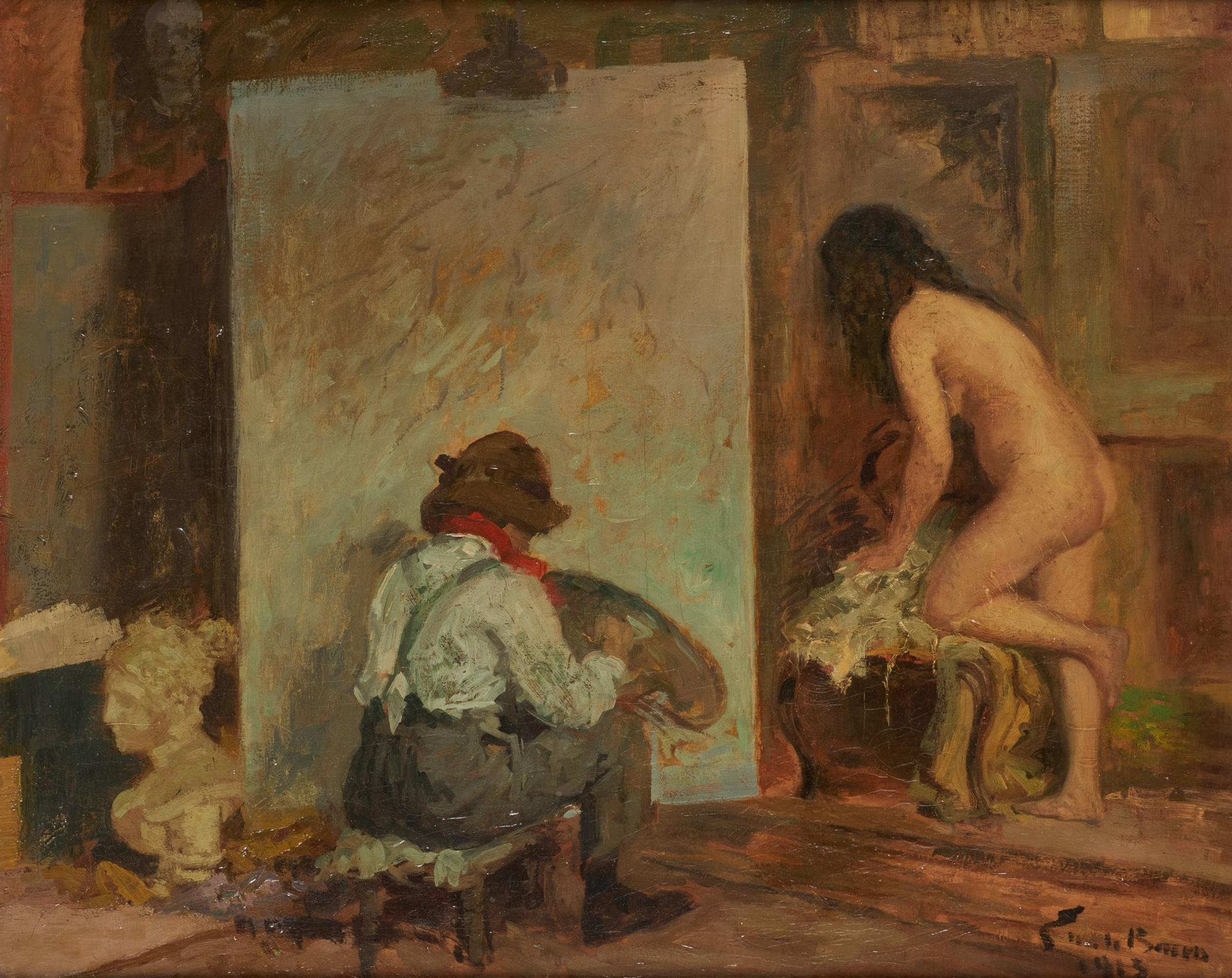
The artist and his model in the studio

Émile Baes was a prolific artist who painted in oil, created pastel drawings, made etchings and designed illustrations for various publications. His subject matter was varied and included nudes, interiors with elegant women, genre scenes, history paintings, portraits, Orientalist scene, landscapes and still lifes.

Baes started in the academic tradition but later developed a Post-Impressionist style. This was perfectly suited for what became his preferred subject: the female nude. He exhibited his nudes in Paris and Brussels, including the series of nudes depicting historical and mythological women under the title Princesses d’Amour. His works in this genre have been referred to as soft-erotic or bordering on the libertine. The hundreds of nudes he was able to sell show there was a great demand for this type of work at the time.

He worked also in pastel and watercolor and published a few sets of his prints.

== Publications ==
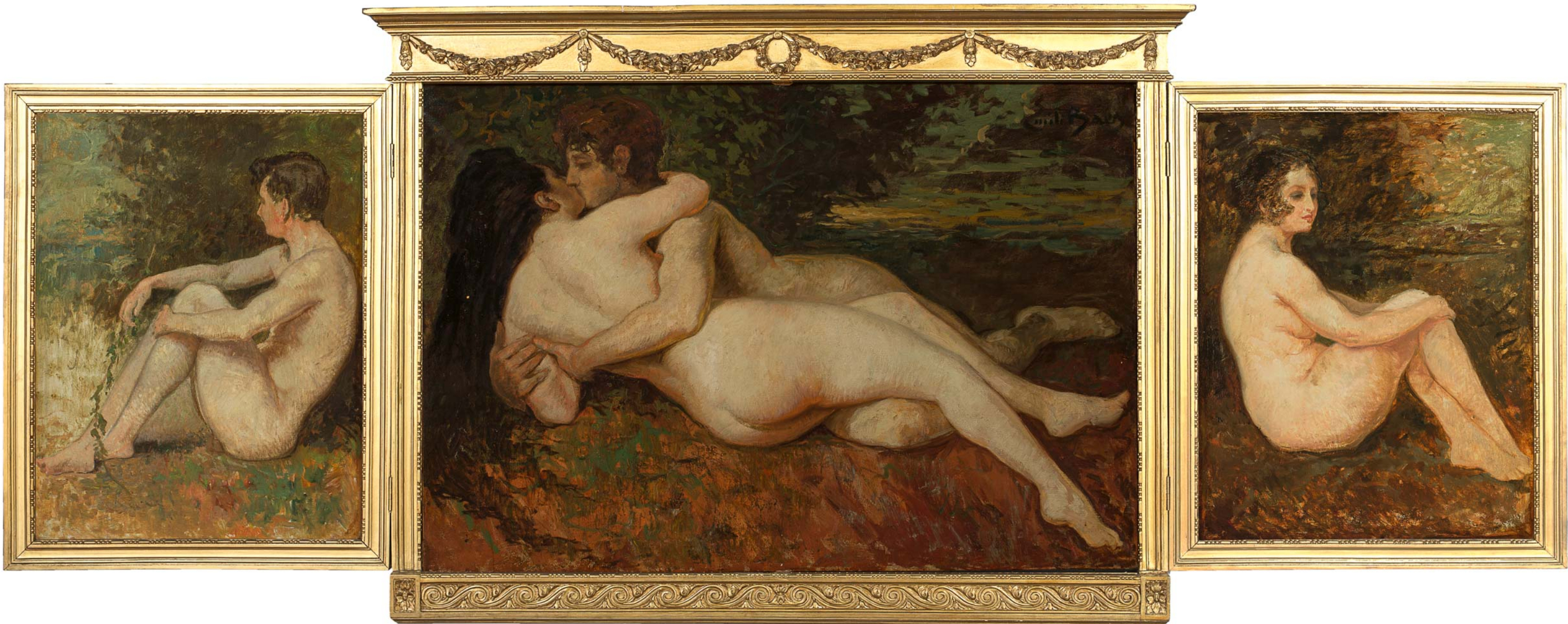
The gate of love

=== Art historical writings ===
Baes had an interest in art history and published and gave public presentations on this subject. In 1912 he published La physionomie du Christ dans l'art (The facial appearance of Christ in art). In this illustrated work, Baes discusses the different ways in which Christ's facial expressions have been represented in the history of art.

At the 11 April 1951 meeting of the Institut de France at the Académie des Beaux-Arts in Paris he made a presentation on L'Amateurisme dans l'art (On amateurism in art), which was later published by the Institut de France. He also wrote the foreword to Paul Sentenac's book on the art works of Louis Ducatel published in 1952.

=== Contributions to other publications ===
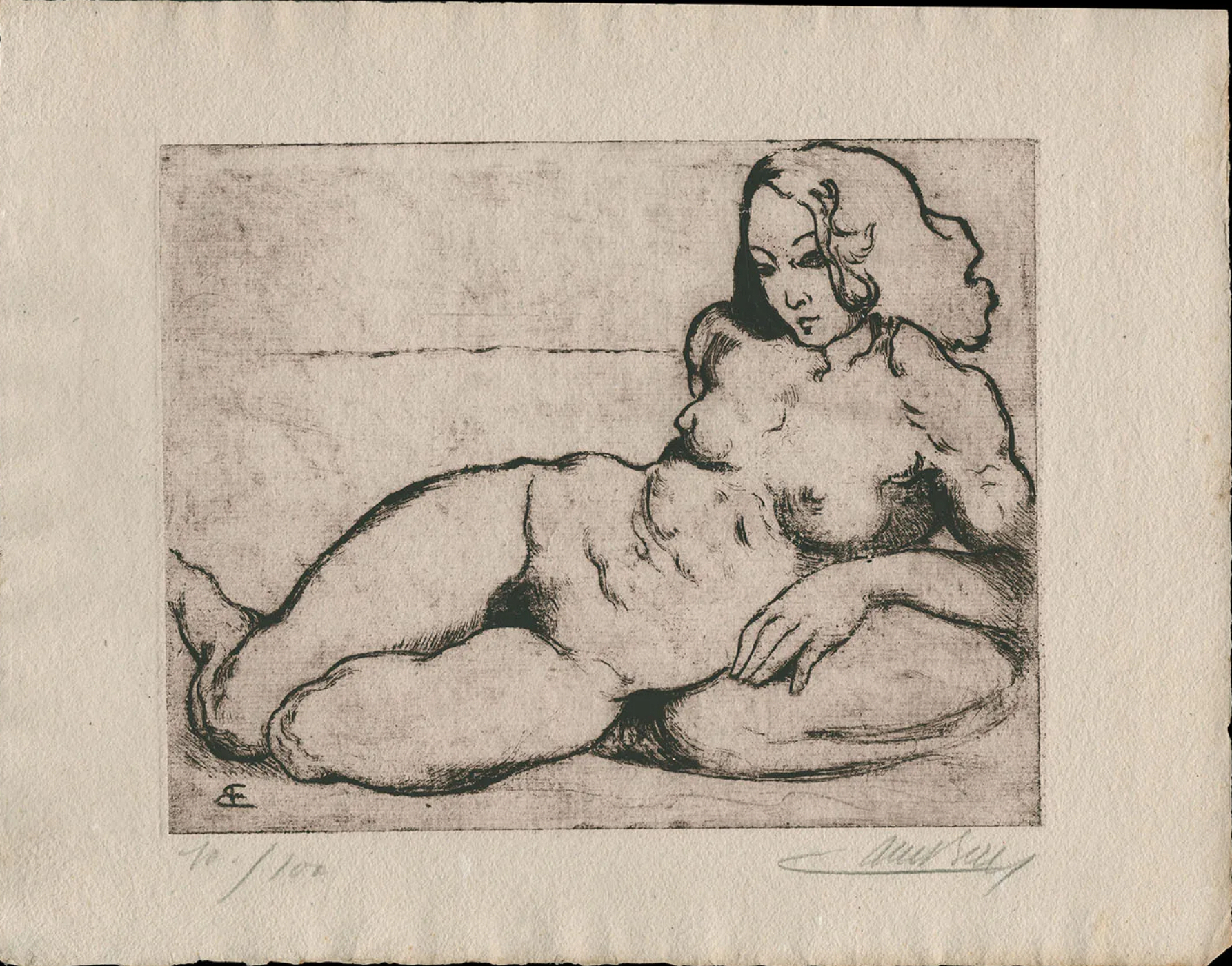
Female nude

Baes also published a few sets of his graphic works mostly dedicated to the nude. Les Dieux sadiques published in 1948 portrays various steamy scenes involving gods from Antiquity. In 1944 he illustrated Louis-Charles Royer's erotic novel Vaudou, roman de mœurs martiniquaises set in the French colony of Martinique.

Other works with illustrations and text by Émile Baes:

- Paul Sentenac, "Louis Ducatel" (1952) with preface by Émile Baes
- Émile Baes, L'Amateurisme dans l'art,... notice lue dans la séance du... 11 avril 1951, (1951) Institut de France. Académie des beaux-arts
- Émile Baes, Les Dieux sadiques. Illustrés de 18 aquarelles originales, entièrement exécutées à la main par l'auteur (1948)
- René Rousseau, "Quelques contes. Illustrés de 6 dessins d'Emile Baès" (1947) with illustrations by Émile Baes
- Marcel Kienné de Mongeot, "L'Abbé chez les nudistes" (1947) with illustrations by Émile Baes
- Émile Baes, "Dix eaux-fortes, vernis mou" (1946) with illustrations by Émile Baes
- Louis-Charles Royer, "Vaudou" (1944) with illustrations by Émile Baes
- Émile Baes, "Portrait du roi des belges Albert Ier par Baës" (1932) with Émile Baes as painter of the reproduced work
- Émile Baes, "La physionomie du Christ dans l'art" (1912)
- Émile Baes, "Etreintes. Ethopée", Paris, Album, 1948, 10 numbered etchings signed by Émile Baes
