= Gunter Verjans =

Belgian footballer

Personal information
- Full name: Gunter Verjans
- Date of birth: 6 October 1973 (age 53)
- Place of birth: Tongres, Belgium
- Height: 1.77 m (5 ft 10 in)
- Position: Midfielder

Youth career
- K. Hoeselt V.V.

Senior career*
| Years | Team | Apps | (Gls) |
| 1991–1995 | K. Sint-Truidense V.V. | 112 | (5) |
| 1995–1999 | Club Brugge K.V. | 48 | (1) |
| 1997 | Royal Antwerp → loan | 12 | (0) |
| 1999–2004 | K. Sint-Truidense V.V. | 118 | (3) |
| 2004–2005 | SC Bregenz | 24 | (0) |
| 2005–2007 | Royal Antwerp FC | 47 | (1) |
| 2007–2010 | C.S. Visé | 25 | (0) |

International career
| 1995–1996 | Belgium | 4 | (0) |
- * Club domestic league appearances and goals

Gunter Verjans (born 6 October 1973 in Tongres) is a former Belgian football player.

He won Belgian League titles with Club Brugge in 1996 and 1998.
