= Dariusz Wolny (footballer) =

Polish footballer (born 1969)

Personal information
- Date of birth: 30 March 1969 (age 57)
- Place of birth: Opole, Poland
- Height: 1.79 m (5 ft 10 in)
- Position: Midfielder

Youth career
- Odra Opole

Senior career*
Years	Team	Apps	(Gls)
1986–1990	Odra Opole		
1991–1995	GKS Katowice	113	(30)

Managerial career
- 2007–2008: FC Katowice
- 2008: Soła Oświęcim
- 2009: Nadzieja Bytom
- 2009: Victoria Chróścice
- 2010: Czarni Sosnowiec (women)
- 2011: Zagłębiak Dąbrowa Górnicza
- 2011–2013: Lot Konopiska
- 2014: Polonia Głubczyce
- 2014: Sparta Katowice
- 2015–: Partyzant Radoszyce
- –2019: Skalnik Kroczyce
- 2020: Górnik Niwka Sosnowiec
- 2020–2022: Górnik Piaski
- 2022: Ostoja Żelisławice
- * Club domestic league appearances and goals

Dariusz Wolny (born 30 April 1969) is a Polish football manager and former player who played as a midfielder.

== Honours ==
GKS Katowice

- Polish Cup: 1992–93
- Polish Super Cup: 1991
