= Martin Baes =

Flemish painter and printmaker (1614–1631)

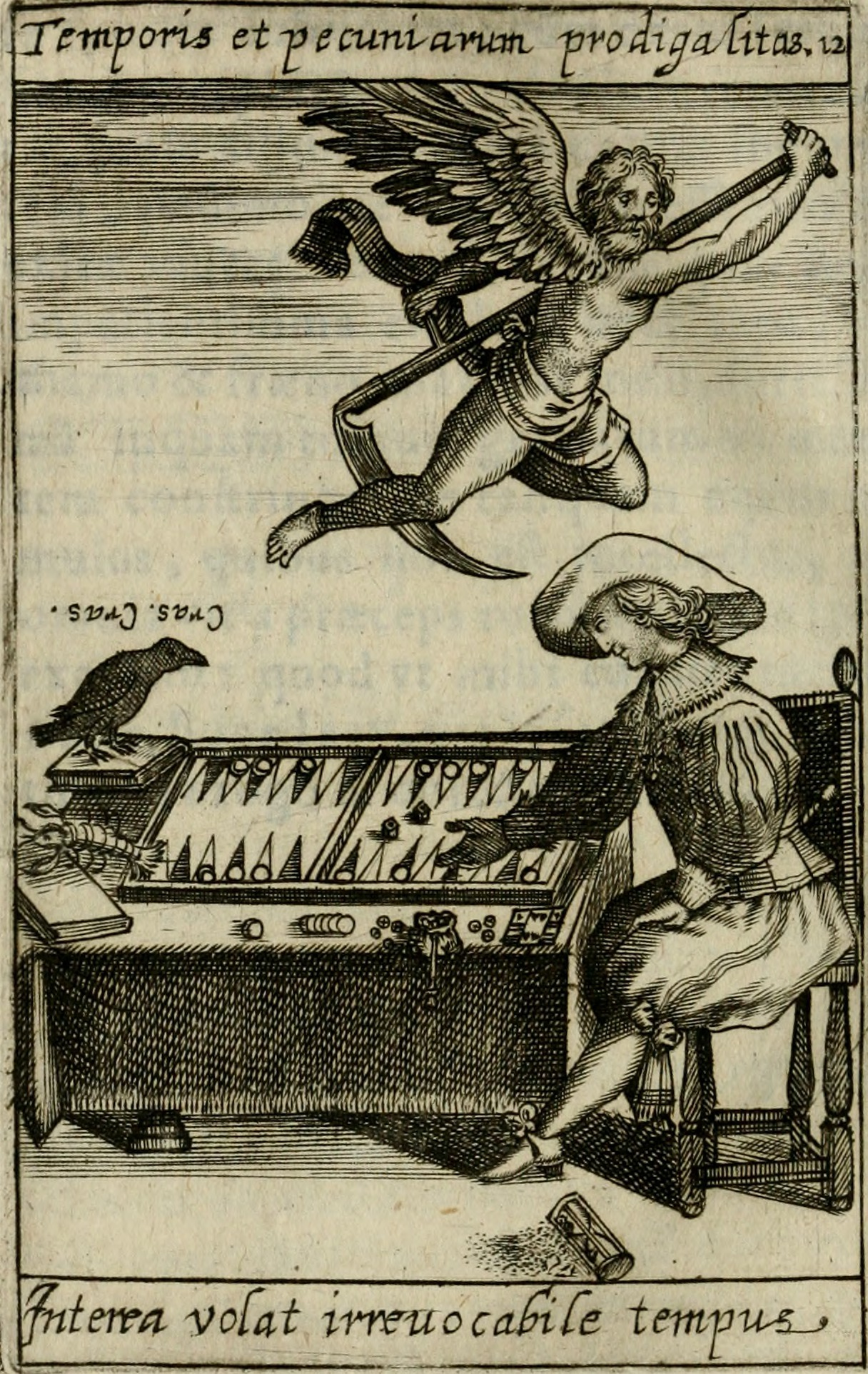
Martin Baes print published in Adolescens academicus sub institutione Salomonis (Early Academic Institution Under Solomon), 1633

Martin Baes, Latinised as Bassius (fl. 1604–1637), was a Flemish engraver and printmaker who mainly worked for publishers in a number of cities. He worked on a number of religious publications that were aimed at English Catholics.

== Life ==
Very little is known about the life of this artist. On stylistic grounds it is assumed that he trained as an engraver in Antwerp. He was therefore possibly a native of Antwerp. Martin Baes worked for the publishers in Saint-Omer in 1614, Tournai in 1617, Arras in 1623 and Douai in 1618–1623.

Most of what is known about him is based on his surviving works. He primarily produced portraits. He possibly died in Doornik.
