= Wim Kooiman =

Dutch footballer

Personal information
- Full name: Wim Kooiman
- Date of birth: 9 September 1960 (age 66)
- Place of birth: Oud-Beijerland, Netherlands
- Position: Central defender

Senior career*
Years	Team	Apps	(Gls)
1980-1988	Cercle Brugge	197	(21)
1988-1994	R.S.C. Anderlecht	151	(12)
1994-1998	Cercle Brugge	96	(5)
Total		444	(38)
- * Club domestic league appearances and goals

Willem (Wim) Kooiman (born 9 September 1960, in Oud-Beijerland) is a Dutch former footballer who played as central defender.

He still resides in Belgium, the country where he was active as professional footballer.

== Honours ==
=== Player ===
==== Cercle Brugge ====
- Belgian Cup: 1984-85

==== RSC Anderlecht ====
- Belgian First Division: 1990–91, 1992-93, 1993-94
- Belgian Cup: 1994 Belgian Cup Final
- Belgian Super Cup: 1993
- European Cup Winners' Cup: 1989-90 (runners-up)
