= Søren Skov =

Danish footballer (1954–2022)

Personal information
- Date of birth: 21 February 1954
- Place of birth: Nyborg, Denmark
- Date of death: 18 August 2022 (aged 68)
- Position: Forward

Senior career*
Years	Team	Apps	(Gls)
1971–1973	Nyborg		
1974	Odense		
1975–1977	FC St. Pauli	50	(10)
1977–1982	Cercle Brugge	149	(56)
1982–1983	Avellino	16	(0)
1983–1985	Hertha BSC	48	(7)
1985–1986	Winterthur		
–1986–1987	St. Gallen		

International career
1971	Denmark U19	2	(0)
1975	Denmark U21	4	(1)
1982	Denmark	3	(0)
- * Club domestic league appearances and goals

Søren Skov (21 February 1954 – 18 August 2022) was a Danish professional footballer who played as a forward. Skov played for a number of clubs in Germany, Italy and Switzerland, but played most of his career for Belgian club Cercle Brugge. He played three games for the Denmark national team.

== Career ==
Born in Nyborg on Funen, Skov played his first years in Funen clubs Nyborg BK and Odense BK. He made his debut for the Denmark under-21 national team in June 1975. Skov played four under-21 national team games and scored one goal from to June to October 1975. In 1975, Skov moved abroad to play professionally for German club FC St. Pauli in the second-tier 2. Bundesliga Nord. He made his debut for St. Pauli in December 1975, and scored two goals in his first three games for the club. He only missed two games for the remainder of the 1975–76 2. Bundesliga season, scoring a total four goals in 19 games as St. Pauli finished 14th. In his second year at St. Pauli, Skov scored seven goals in 34 games, as St. Pauli won the 1976–77 2. Bundesliga league and was promoted into the top-flight Bundesliga championship.

Skov did not represent St. Pauli in the Bundesliga, as he subsequently moved to play for Cercle Brugge in the top-flight Belgian First Division championship. In his first season at Cercle, Skov scored three goals in 29 league games, as Cercle finished 17th of 18 teams, and were relegated to the Belgian Second Division. Skov stayed with Cercle and helped the club win the 1978–79 Second Division to bounce straight back into the First Division. In the next two seasons, Skov scored 19 goals in 62 games for Cercle. Skov's most successful season at Cercle was the 1981–82 First Division season, as he scored 23 goals in 33 games. Skov caught the eye of Danish national team coach Sepp Piontek, and Skov made his national team debut on 5 May 1982, in a 1–1 draw against Sweden. He played a further two national team games in May 1982.

In the Summer 1982, Skov moved to Italy to play for Avellino in the Serie A championship. Avellino finished 9th in the 1982–83 Serie A season. In 1983, Skov moved on to German club Hertha BSC in the 2. Bundesliga. In his two seasons at Hertha, Skov scored seven goals in 48 games. Skov ended his career with Swiss clubs FC Winterthur and FC St. Gallen.

== Honours ==
FC St. Pauli

- 2. Bundesliga Nord: 1976–77

Cercle Brugge

- Belgian Second Division: 1978–79
