= Claude Verspaille =

Belgian footballer and manager

Personal information
- Date of birth: 21 June 1964 (age 62)
- Position: Defender

Senior career*
Years	Team	Apps	(Gls)
1981–1990	K.V. Kortrijk		
1990–1995	Club Brugge KV		
1995–1999	R.E. Mouscron		
1999–2000	K.V. Kortrijk		

Managerial career
- 2000–2003: R.F.C. Tournai
- 2004–2005: K.S.K. Wevelgem City
- 2006–2007: R.E. Mouscron (assistant)
- * Club domestic league appearances and goals

Claude Verspaille (born 21 June 1964) is a retired Belgian football defender and later manager.
