= Muisi Ajao =

Nigerian footballer

Personal information
- Date of birth: 2 December 1978 (age 47)
- Place of birth: Abeokuta, Nigeria
- Height: 1.83 m (6 ft 0 in)
- Position: Defender

Senior career*
Years	Team	Apps	(Gls)
1994	Bendel United	31	(2)
1995	Shooting Stars	29	(1)
1996	Julius Berger	5	(0)
1996–1997	Cercle Brugge	5	(0)
1997–1998	Kaizer Chiefs	22	(1)
1998–2002	Mamelodi Sundowns	89	(2)
2003–2004	Da Nang		
2005	Bush Bucks		
2006	Kingfisher East Bengal		
2007	Manning Rangers		

International career
2000–2001	Nigeria	10	
- * Club domestic league appearances and goals as of 6 November 2006

Muisi Ajao (born 2 December 1978) is a Nigerian retired footballer.

He has played a few matches for Nigerian national team and played in the Belgian league and South African Premier League. He played for clubs in Singapore, Qatar, and China.

== International career ==
On 16 September 2001, Ajao debuted for Nigeria national football team against South Korea in 1-2 loss match.
