= Dominique Baes =

Belgian footballer (1893–1918)

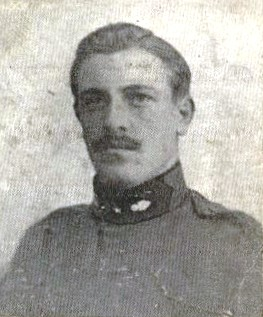

Personal information
- Full name: Dominique Jerome Charles Baes
- Date of birth: 3 February 1893
- Place of birth: Bruges, Belgium
- Date of death: 26 August 1918 (aged 25)
- Place of death: Beveren-aan-de-IJzer, Belgium

International career
Years	Team	Apps	(Gls)
1913	Belgium	1	(0)

Dominique Jerome Charles Baes (3 February 1893 – 26 August 1918) was a Belgian footballer. He played in one match for the Belgium national football team in 1913. He died of wounds received in action during World War I while serving in the Belgian Army.
