= John Moelaert =

Belgian footballer (1943–2023)

Personal information
- Date of birth: 14 January 1943
- Place of birth: Bruges, Belgium
- Date of death: 8 March 2023 (aged 80)
- Place of death: Bruges, Belgium
- Position: Left-back

Youth career
- Cercle Brugge

Senior career*
| Years | Team | Apps | (Gls) |
| 1962–1966 | Cercle Brugge | 85 | (0) |
| 1966–1972 | Club Brugge | 141 | (1) |
| 1972–1974 | Harelbeke | | |
| 1974–1976 | Eendracht Aalter | | |
| 1976–1977 | SV Wevelgem City | | |

Managerial career
- 1977–1978: Sporting Beernem
- 1978-1984: SV Jabbeke
- 1984–1988: Eendracht De Haan
- 1988-1991: Excelsior Zedelgem
- 1991–1995: Eendracht De Haan
- * Club domestic league appearances and goals

John Moelaert (14 January 1943 – 8 March 2023) was a Belgian footballer who played as a left-back.

== Career ==
Moelaert made his debut for hometown club Cercle Brugge on 23 December 1962 against FC Antwerp.

In 1966, Cercle were relegated to second division. But more disastrous were the corruption rumours spread by Lierse player Bogaerts, who said he had been approached by someone of Cercle. Although Cercle formally denied these rumours, they were sentenced to play in third division, back to where they were five years ago. Even though Cercle's vice-president won a lawsuit against the KBVB, which declared him innocent in the corruption case, the damage had been done and Cercle remained at the third level of Belgian football. This caused Cercle to lose important players, a.o. Moelaert. He chose to leave Cercle for city rivals Club Brugge alongside Gilbert Bailliu, a much-discussed transfer. He ended up playing 92 matches for Cercle in all competitions.

He also became a regular at Club Brugge, totalling 141 matches for them. He won the Belgian Cup with them in 1968, after defeating Beerschot with penalties and in 1970.

== Personal life and death ==
After his playing career he worked as a representative in medical and physio equipment. Moelaert married Liliane Rosseel after his first wife died of an illness; with Rosseel he had two sons and a daughter. They lived in Jabbeke.

He died of heart failure in the AZ Sint Jan Hospital in Bruges in March 2023, aged 80.

== Honours ==
Club Brugge

- Belgian Cup: 1968, 1970
