= Omer Baes =

Belgian footballer (1889–1929)

Personal information
- Date of birth: 15 January 1889
- Date of death: 5 May 1929 (aged 40)

International career
Years	Team	Apps	(Gls)
1913	Belgium	2	(0)

Omer Baes (15 January 1889 – 5 May 1929) was a Belgian footballer. He played in two matches for the Belgium national football team in 1913.
