= Bernard Verheecke =

Belgian association football player

Personal information
- Full name: Bernard Verheecke
- Date of birth: 13 January 1957 (age 69)
- Place of birth: Bruges, Belgium
- Position: Striker

Senior career*
Years	Team	Apps	(Gls)
1973-1976	Cercle Brugge	49	(12)
1976-1980	Club Brugge	106	(25)
1980-1981	RWD Molenbeek	-	(-)
1981-1983	Servette Genève	-	(-)
1983-1985	Cercle Brugge	52	(14)
1985-1988	AA Gent	-	(-)
- * Club domestic league appearances and goals

Bernard Verheecke (Bruges, 13 January 1957) is a former Belgian footballer who played as a forward.

== Honours ==
Club Brugge

- Belgian First Division: 1977–78, 1979–80
- Belgian Cup: 1978-79 (finalists)
- European Champion Clubs' Cup: 1977-78 (runners-up)
- Jules Pappaert Cup: 1978
- Bruges Matins: 1979
