= Sam de Meester =

Dutch footballer

Personal information
- Full name: Samuel Roger de Meester Afana
- Date of birth: 11 January 1982 (age 44)
- Position: Midfielder

Senior career*
Years	Team	Apps	(Gls)
	Feyenoord	0	(0)
2000-2002	SBV Excelsior	32	(4)
2002/2003	Cercle Brugge K.S.V.		
- KSK Malgedem
2007-2008	FC Augsburg	1	(0)
2008-2009	TSV Gersthofen	27	(2)
2011/2012	FC Etar 1924 Veliko Tarnovo	4	(0)
- * Club domestic league appearances and goals

Samuel Roger de Meester Afana (born 11 January 1982) is a retired footballer.

== Career ==
After failing to make an appearance for Feyenoord, one of the most successful Dutch clubs, de Meester signed for Dutch second-division side SBV Excelsior, where he made 32 league appearances, before joining Cercle Brugge K.S.V. in Belgium. From there, he joined Belgian lower-league team KSK Malgedem.

In 2007, de Meester signed for FC Augsburg in the German second division, where he made one appearance.

In 2008, at the age of 26, he signed for German sixth-division side TSV Gersthofen.

In 2011, he signed for FC Etar 1924 Veliko Tarnovo in the Bulgarian second division.
