= Gilbert Bailliu =

Belgian footballer (1936–2023)

Personal information
- Date of birth: 4 September 1936
- Place of birth: Bruges, Belgium
- Date of death: 2 April 2023 (aged 86)
- Place of death: Ostend, Belgium
- Position: Striker

Youth career
- 1947–1953: Cercle Brugge

Senior career*
Years	Team	Apps	(Gls)
1953–1966	Cercle Brugge	221	(98)
1966–1970	Club Brugge	71	(32)
1970–1971	Zwevegem Sport		
1971–1974	HO Wingene		

Managerial career
- 1971–1974: HO Wingene
- Cercle Brugge (youth coach)
- * Club domestic league appearances and goals

Gilbert Bailliu (4 September 1936 – 2 April 2023) was a Belgian footballer who played as a striker, notably for Cercle Brugge and Club Brugge.

== Career ==
Bailliu started his career at hometown club Cercle Brugge. He made his début for the first team in 1954 against FC Izegem. At that time, Cercle were playing in third division, their lowest level ever. It would last until 1957 for Bailliu to play on a regular basis for the first team. This was due to his conscription and a knee injury. But after these problems, Bailliu would become a key player for the green and black side, becoming top scorer of the team for five seasons. This way, he had a great deal in achieving promotion back to the highest level of Belgian football in 1961. And even at the highest level, Bailliu would remain a goal scoring machine.

In 1966, Cercle were relegated to second division. But more disastrous were the corruption rumours spread by Lierse player Bogaerts, who said he had been approached by someone of Cercle. Although Cercle formally denied these rumours, they were sentenced to play in third division, back to where they were five years ago. Even though Cercle's vice-president won a lawsuit against the KBVB which declared him innocent in the corruption case, the damage had been done, and Cercle remained at the third level of Belgian football. This caused Cercle to lose important players, a.o. Gilbert Bailliu. He chose to leave Cercle for city rivals Club Brugge alongside John Moelaert, a much-discussed transfer. He ended up with 98 goals scored in 221 matches for Cercle.

Also at Club Brugge, Bailliu kept on showing his goal scoring capacities, totalling 40 goals in 86 matches. Bailliu won the Belgian Cup in 1968 after defeating Beerschot with penalties.

== Personal life and death ==
Bailliu lived close to the Club Brugge stadium and was married to Christiane Serry; the couple had two daughters and two sons who also played for Cercle.

Bailliu died in a nursing home in Ostend on 2 April 2023, at the age of 86.

== Honours ==
Club Brugge

- Belgian Cup: 1968

Sporting positions
Preceded by (Belgium) André Perot	Cercle Brugge top scorer 1959–1960 – 1961–1962	Succeeded by (Belgium) Eric Daels
Preceded by (Belgium) Eric Daels	Cercle Brugge top scorer 1965	Succeeded by (Belgium) Eric Buyse
