= Cercle Brugge KSV =

Association football club in Belgium

Cercle Brugge
- Full name: Cercle Brugge; Koninklijke Sportvereniging
- Nicknames: Groen en Zwart (Green and Black), De Vereniging
- Founded: 9 April 1899; 127 years ago
- Ground: Jan Breydel Stadium
- Capacity: 29,062
- Owner: Dmitry Rybolovlev
- Chairman: Thomas Tousseyn
- Head coach: Pedro Caixinha
- League: Belgian Pro League
- 2025–26: Belgian Pro League, 14th of 16
- Website: www.cerclebrugge.be
Home colours	Away colours

Cercle Brugge Koninklijke Sportvereniging (Dutch pronunciation: [ˈsɛr(ə)klə ˈbrʏɣə ˈkoːnɪŋkləkə ˈspɔrtfəˌreːnəɣɪŋ]) is a Belgian professional football club based in Bruges. They compete in the Belgian Pro League, the top flight of Belgian football. Their matricule number is 12. The club plays home games at the 29,042-seat Jan Breydel Stadium, which they share with fierce rivals Club Brugge. Cercle Brugge won their first national title in 1911, and won two more titles (in 1927 and 1930) before the Second World War. The side also won the Belgian Cup in 1927 and in 1985, and have represented Belgium in European tournaments on several occasions.

== History ==
=== Early years (1899–1919) ===
Cercle Brugge was founded on 9 April 1899 as Cercle Sportif Brugeois by former students of the Saint Francis Xavier Institute, colloquially known as De Frères (English: The Friars) in Bruges. Originally, the organisation focused on five sports: football, cricket, lawn tennis, running and cycling.

Cercle Brugge became a member of the Royal Belgian Football Association in 1900 and were awarded matricule number 12. The same year the club moved from their football field in Sint-Michiels, which was owned by De Frères, to a pitch in Sint-Andries, which offered better facilities and was closer to Bruges' main railway station in 't Zand square. Cercle achieved their first success in the 1902 Henri Fraeys Cup, defeating Olympique Iris Club Lillois (the predecessor of Lille OSC) and US Tourcoing. After winning another few friendly cups, Cercle achieved their first big success, winning the national title in the 1910–11 season. Cercle ended a single point ahead of their main rivals FC Bruges, after their confrontation on the season's last matchday ended in a 1–1 draw.

Three years later, Belgian football was devastated by World War I: Cercle lost two first-team players, Louis Baes and Joseph Evrard, and their stadium and facilities sustained heavy damage. Former player Alphonse Six also died.

=== Rebuilding (1919–1924) ===
Cercle resumed competitive football in 1919 with an almost completely new team. Louis Saeys was the only player to remain in the team from before the war. Expectations were low, but the club finished third in the league. In 1921 the club raised a monument in remembrance of those affiliated with Cercle who had died in WWI: the unveiling was marred by tragedy, when a biplane scheduled to fly over the stadium as a tribute crashed, killing its two passengers. The monument still exists and now stands in front of the Jan Breydel Stadium.

In 1923, Cercle extended their stadium facilities again, moving 100 metres from their old pitch to a newly built stadium. This ground, later named the Edgard De Smedt Stadium, became Cercle's home for more than 50 years.

=== Two national titles (1924–1930) ===
In 1924, the club changed its name from Cercle Sportif Brugeois to Royal Cercle Sportif Brugeois. The club embarked on a successful period, led by two key players: Belgian record international Florimond Vanhalme and player-coach Louis Saeys. Cercle led the league midway through the 1925–26 season, but player injuries led to poor results that saw them finish in fifth place. Several important players left Cercle after this season, leaving hopes low for the 1926–27 campaign, but the year saw Cercle achieve their second national championship on the penultimate matchday with a thrilling 6–5 win over Daring Bruxelles. The victory was overshadowed by two deaths at the club a few months earlier: Albert Van Coile, who had succumbed to injuries sustained in a collision with the goalkeeper during a match against US Tourcoing, and former chairman René de Peellaert, who died from pneumonia which he had caught during Van Coile's funeral.

In 1928, goalkeeper Robert Braet emerged as a new star at Cercle: the player, who had only switched from the outfield to goal after an illness, went on to spend his whole career at Cercle, later becoming chairman.

Cercle made a slow start to the 1929–30 season, entering the mid-season winter break in sixth place and seven points adrift of leaders Antwerp. Nonetheless, by the closing weekend of the season they had narrowed the gap to a single point; the final game saw them score a 4–1 victory at home to Lierse SK. The side then faced an anxious wait for the result of Antwerp against 10th placed Standard Liège, contemporary telecommunication facilities at grounds being poor. In the end, the news reached team captain Florimond Vanhalme that Antwerp had lost 3–5, meaning Cercle had won their third and (thus far) final title. Because of this title Cercle were invited to take part in the Coupe des Nations, which is regarded as the predecessor of the Champions League.

=== Decline (1930–1938) ===
Cercle could not maintain the results of their championship season, ending 7th in 1931. New title aspirations disappeared completely as Cercle continued to finish in the middle of the league over the next several seasons. The experienced players who had helped achieve the title retired or left the team, and the youngsters who replaced them could not match their talent. The downward spiral reached a low with relegation to the Belgian Second Division in 1936. Cercle took the opportunity to make sweeping changes, appointing a new coach and board. The changes proved successful, and Cercle won promotion back to the highest division after only two years.

=== World War II in Belgium (1939–1945) ===
The Second World War made a regular football competition impossible in 1939. Cercle therefore took part in regional championships, in which each team met another multiple times. Cercle, though, had comparatively little competition in its native West Flanders, and lost contact with the high standards maintained in the stronger Antwerp and Brussels regional championships.

A national contest resumed in 1941; Cercle finished the season last but one in the league. Usually this would have meant relegation, but the KBVB ruled that the circumstances of the war, which limited training opportunities and youth development, meant no team should be relegated.

Cercle were made to play one match behind closed doors during the 1943 season, after an incident during a game against Anderlecht. Supporters, furious with referee De Braeckel's decisions to annul two Cercle goals for unclear reasons and to award Anderlecht a goal that looked offside, chased De Braeckel from the stadium. Two Cercle fans proposed to the Cercle Brugge board that they give the referee a ride to the Bruges railway station; the board accepted, but the fans instead drove the referee toward Zedelgem, where they threw him from the car in the middle of nowhere.

Immediately after liberation in 1944, an unofficial championship was organised among the teams who had in 1939 made up the top division. Most teams, though, were unable to participate, and the Von Rundstedt Offensive spelled the end of the initiative. The end ranking of this competition has not even been archived by the Belgian football association.

=== Second decline and return (1945–1961) ===
Cercle could not avoid relegation in the first season after the war and, despite being favorites for promotion the following season, struggled to compete in the lower league, finishing their first season there in seventh place. The next four seasons brought more mediocre league positions, until in 1951 the KBVB revealed plans to create a new second division. Clubs in the current second tier were required to finish eighth to remain in the second level; Cercle ended in 15th place that season, leaving them even further away from the top flight.

Cercle remained in this third tier until 1956, when they won their league. They spent the next season once again battling relegation, this time with more success, though their second season back in the second tier went less well. The club secured only nine points in the season's first half, avoiding relegation only with a win under coach Louis Versyp in the season's last match. A few weeks later Versyp was replaced by the Frenchman Edmond Delfour. This replacement inaugurated a more successful new era at Cercle who, under Delfour's command, missed promotion only barely in 1960 and returned at last to the top flight in 1961.

=== Short resurrection (1961–1965) ===
Cercle had taken 15 years to return to the highest division, and remained there for only five more. They scarcely escaped relegation in their first season back at the top level, thanks only to a successful proposition by Antwerp that changed the way teams with equal points were ordered in the league. Until this season, where two teams had the same number of points the one with fewer defeats was ranked higher; under Antwerp's scheme, the team with the greater number of victories placed higher. Thanks to the changed rule Cercle finished ahead of Thor Waterschei, who would have placed above them under the previous rule. Ironically, Antwerp became victims of their own proposal: Standard obtained the second place, with Antwerp having equal points but fewer victories (but also fewer defeats).

=== Barren years and the five-year-plan (1965–1971) ===
This spell in the top division saw Cercle enjoy little success, and in 1965–66 they finished last behind Berchem. Worse, the team was accused of corruption by Lierse player Bogaerts, who said Cercle's vice-president Paul Lantsoght had engaged in bribery. The Belgian football association sentenced Cercle to relegation from the second division to the third. Lantsoght launched a lawsuit against the KBVB, which he won in June 1967, but the damage was done: Cercle remained in the third division, losing many of their players, and were not able to achieve promotion immediately.

In 1967, Cercle appointed Urbain Braems as head coach. Braems designed an ambitious plan to restore Cercle to the top division within five years. During Braem's first season the club competed with Eendracht Aalst for promotion: they played one another two matches before the end of the season, tied on 41 points, but Aalst with the greater number of victories to their name. Cercle had to win the match to take the lead, and lost it 0–1: but Cercle's youth team coach, André Penninck, had noticed that the Aalst team delegate had made a mistake, switching the names of the substitutes, which meant that, according to the match paper, Aalst had ended the match playing illegally with two goalkeepers. Cercle lodged a complaint with the Belgian football association, who confirmed Aalst's 0–1 win, and also dismissed a first appeal. Cercle then made their second and final possible appeal, and on this instance ordered the football association to apply the rules. On 21 June 1968, Cercle received the news that the decision had been overturned, and they would be promoted to the second division. In July of the same year, Royal Cercle Sportif Brugeois changed their name to Cercle Brugge KSV

Cercle were immediately able to play a role in the second division title contest, thanks to a successful transfer policy. After 20 matches Cercle led the league, only to finish the season fourth, four points behind champions AS Oostende. Next season, Cercle again finished four points behind the champions, KFC Diest. But in 1971, one year before the end of the five-year-plan, Cercle achieved their goal: they won promotion and were back at the top.

=== Settling at the top flight (1971–1996) ===
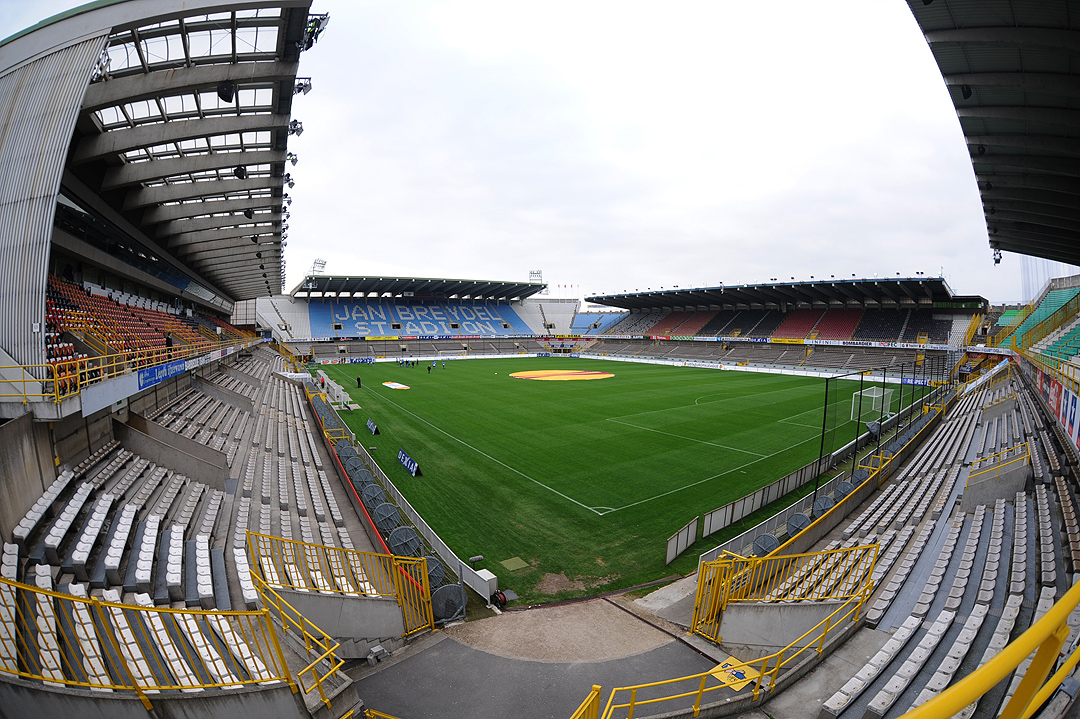
Jan Breydel Stadium.

Cercle tried immediately to avoid the relegation battle by fortifying their squad, signing Fernand Goyvaerts and Benny Nielsen. Early results saw them win points from both Anderlecht and Club Brugge, respectively champions and vice-champions that season, and they finished the season in fifth place, the first of a succession of secure midtable finishes. In 1975 the club left the Edgard De Smedt Stadium goodbye to move to the Olympia Stadium, which was later renamed the Jan Breydel Stadium during Euro 2000.

Between 1967 and 1977, Cercle had had only two coaches, Urbain Braems and Han Grijzenhout, but Grijzenhout left after a lucrative offer from SC Lokeren. Cercle appointed Lakis Petropoulos as new coach, but the appointment proved an uneasy one: language difficulties between the Greek coach and his players were compounded by player injuries, and the club was unexpectedly relegated. Han Grijzenhout was again appointed as coach to get Cercle back to the first division as soon as possible. After only one season, Cercle became champions, ending one point before SK Tongeren.

Again, Cercle enjoyed a comfortable period in the top division, climaxing with a Belgian Cup win in 1985. The final saw Cercle face SK Beveren; the score was 1–1 after 90 minutes, and 30 minutes' added time produced no further goals, so the match went to penalties. Beveren player Paul Lambrichts kicked the last penalty of the series against the crossbar, and Cercle celebrated. For the first time since 1930, Cercle qualified for an official European tournament. They drew Dynamo Dresden as opponents, winning the home match 3–2, but in Dresden Cercle lost 2–1, losing the confrontation on the away goals rule.

Cercle again reached the Belgian cup final in 1986, this time meeting city rivals Club Brugge. Cercle lost 0–3, with two questionable penalties scored by Jean-Pierre Papin. A next high point came in the recruitment of Yugoslav striker Josip Weber in 1988: despite a difficult start in Belgium, Weber proved to be Cercle's best post-war goal scorer, ranking as the team's top scorer from 1989 to 1994 (when he left for Anderlecht) successively. Weber was also national top scorer from 1992 until 1994. Another prominent player, Romanian record international Dorinel Munteanu, signed for Cercle in the 1990s.

In 1996, Cercle once more reached the national cup final, again facing Club Brugge: this time, Cercle lost 2–1. Nonetheless, Club's double victory meant Cercle still qualified for the UEFA Cup, in which they drew the Norwegian side SK Brann. Cercle won the home match 3–2, but lost 4–0 in Bergen. Cercle then lost some important players whom they failed to adequately replace, and were relegated, along with KV Mechelen, in 1997.

=== Second division (1997–2003) ===
Cercle aimed at an immediate return, but were thwarted early on. They finished their first season in 10th place, and gained only a single place increase in league position over each of the next four seasons. In 2002–03 the board chose a new chairman, former Standaard Boekhandel director Frans Schotte, and a new coach, former player Jerko Tipurić, who had also been coach in Cercle's 1996–97 relegation season. The new staff helped Cercle to achieve promotion once more in 2003.

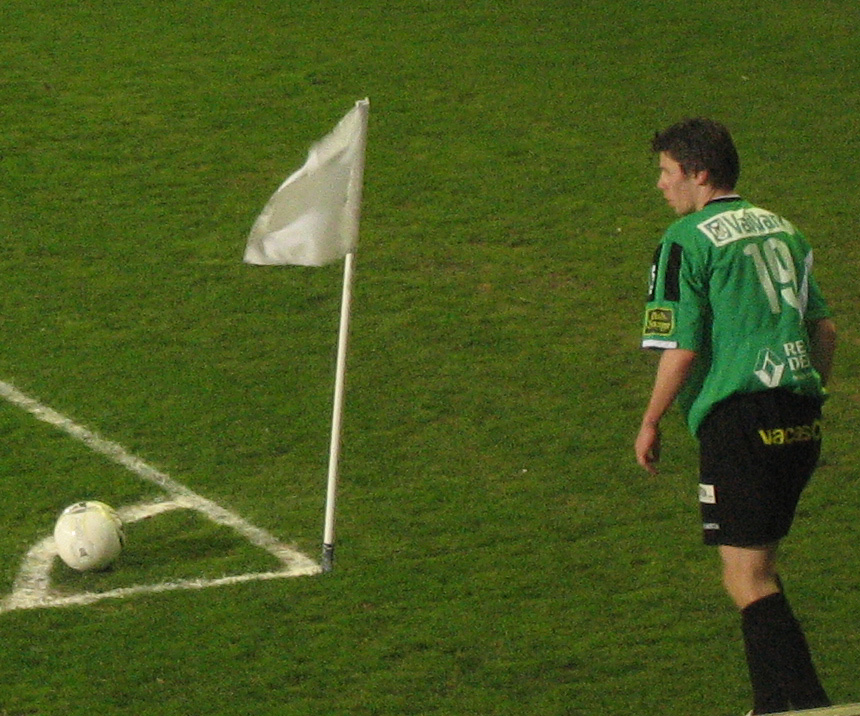
Former player Stijn De Smet taking a corner kick.

=== Settling in the top flight again (2003–2015) ===
The 2003–4 season saw newly signed players Harold Meyssen and Nordin Jbari proving instrumental in avoiding relegation, and the Cercle board chose not to extend Tipurić's contract. Harm Van Veldhoven was chosen to replace him, and oversaw three decent but unspectacular seasons for Cercle, brightened by the emergence of the talented Stijn De Smet and Tom De Sutter. When Van Veldhoven was announced as new coach of G. Beerschot, Cercle chose former Anderlecht player and assistant manager Glen De Boeck as his successor. In his debut year, De Boeck surprised with successful attacking and attractive football. Cercle ended the season fourth in the top division, their best post-war ranking. The 2009–10 season saw them ending as runners-up in the Belgian Cup final, which was enough to qualify for the Europa League. Shortly afterwards, manager Glen De Boeck surprisingly signed a contract with Germinal Beerschot, only one month after having signed a new 4-year-deal with Cercle Brugge. De Boeck declared to the press that he only had some questions about his lawn mower for Beerschot president Herman Kesters, but had finally ended up signing for the Antwerp side. Cercle Brugge appointed AA Gent reserves coach Bob Peeters as their new manager. It will be Peeters' first experience in the Pro League. This season also brought Cercle's first European attendance in the 2010–11 UEFA Europa League, where they defeated TPS from Finland and reached the third qualifying round where they lost against Anorthosis Famagusta F.C. In November 2012 Peeters was fired for poor results. Despite attracting star player Eiður Guðjohnsen, he failed to get Cercle away from that last place and was replaced by Foeke Booy. The team still struggled to avoid relegation. After the bad results they sacked Foeke Booy and the new trainer was Lorenzo Staelens. Lorenzo Staelens would be replaced by Arnar Vidarsson in their last season in first division. A few months later Vidarsson would also be replaced by Dennis Van Wijk, Cercle eventually lost Play-Off III to SK Lierse and relegate to second division.

=== Second division, financial difficulties and take-over by Russian Oligarch (2015–present) ===
The first season in the second division, Cercle ended 5th out of 17. The next season (2016–17), the competition was renamed to 1B and contained 8 teams. Manager Vincent Euvrard was sacked after a disappointing start and was replaced by José Riga. Cercle ended 7th in the competition and had to play a relegation poule with Tubize, Oud-Heverlee Leuven and Lommel United to secure their place in 1B. Lommel United ended last in the play-downs. During the season it was obvious that Cercle could not compete with other teams any more due to their financial status and the fact that many of the other teams had foreign investors. Cercle also began to search for an investor. On 15 February 2017 Cercle found in Dmitry Rybolovlev a partner to continue their existence in the future. Dimitri Rybolovlev is now the majority shareholder and owner of Cercle. On 10 March 2018, Cercle became champion in the Proximus League, the Belgian second division after winning against Beerschot 3–2 on aggregate. The winning goal – a penalty kick, was scored by Irvin Cardona, a loaned player from Monaco, in the last minute of the game and thus the season.

Cercle reached the knockout stage of a European competition for the first time during the 2024–25 UEFA Conference League. They lost in the round of 16 to Jagiellonia Białystok with an aggregate score of 2–3.

== Honours ==
=== Domestic ===
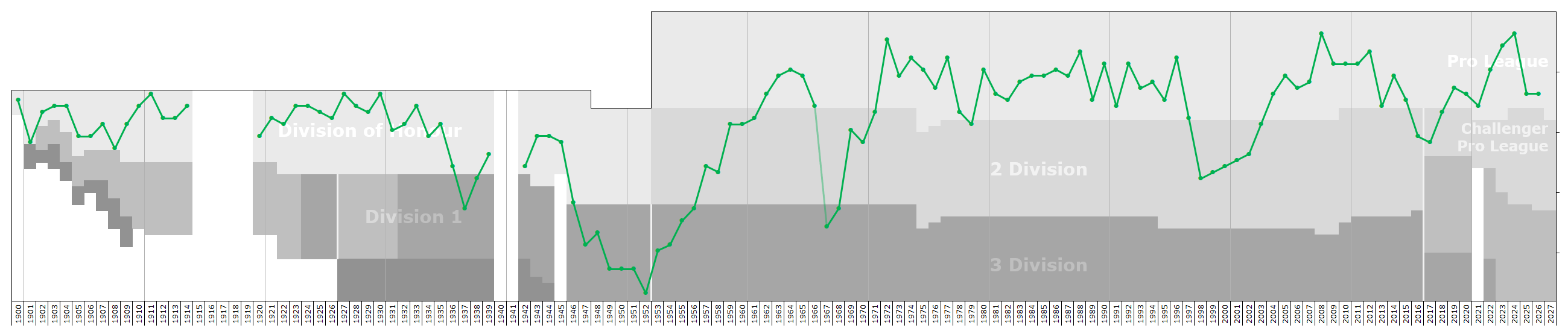
Historical chart of Cercle Brugge league performance

- Belgian First Division A:
  - Winners (3): 1910–11, 1926–27, 1929–30
- Belgian Second Division:
  - Winners (5): 1937–38, 1970–71, 1978–79, 2002–03, 2017–18
  - Runners-up (1): 1960–61
- Belgian Cup:
  - Winners (2): 1926–27, 1984–85
  - Runners-up (5): 1912–13, 1985–86, 1995–96, 2009–10, 2012–13
- Belgian Supercup:
  - Runners-up (2): 1985, 1996

=== International ===
- Tournoi Pascal
  - Winners (1): 1914
  - Runners-up (1): 1924

=== Individual ===
- African Footballer of the Year
  - Kalusha Bwalya (1988)
- Belgian First Division top scorer:
  - Josip Weber (1991–92: 26 goals, 1992–93: 31 goals, 1993–94: 31 goals), Kévin Denkey (2023–24: 27 goals)
- Professional Footballer of the Year (Second Division)
  - Xavier Mercier (2017–18)

== European record ==
=== UEFA club competition record ===
As of 13 March 2025

Season	Competition	Round	Opponent	Home	Away	Aggregate
1985–86	UEFA Cup Winners' Cup	1	(East Germany) Dynamo Dresden	3–2	1–2	4–4 (a)
1996–97	UEFA Cup Winners' Cup	1	(Norway) Brann	3–2	0–4	3–6
2010–11	UEFA Europa League	2Q	(Finland) Turun Palloseura	0–1	2–1	2–2 (a)
2010–11	UEFA Europa League	3Q	(Cyprus) Anorthosis Famagusta	1–0	1–3	2–3
2024–25	UEFA Europa League	2Q	(Scotland) Kilmarnock	1–0	1–1	2–1
2024–25	UEFA Europa League	3Q	(Norway) Molde	1–0	0–3	1–3
2024–25	UEFA Conference League	PO	(Poland) Wisła Kraków	1–4	6–1	7–5
2024–25	UEFA Conference League	League phase	(Switzerland) St. Gallen	6–2	—N/a	8th
2024–25	UEFA Conference League	League phase	(Iceland) Víkingur Reykjavík	—N/a	1–3	8th
2024–25	UEFA Conference League	League phase	(Austria) LASK	—N/a	0–0	8th
2024–25	UEFA Conference League	League phase	(Scotland) Heart of Midlothian	2–0	—N/a	8th
2024–25	UEFA Conference League	League phase	(Slovenia) Olimpija Ljubljana	—N/a	4–1	8th
2024–25	UEFA Conference League	League phase	(Turkey) İstanbul Başakşehir	1–1	—N/a	8th
2024–25	UEFA Conference League	R16	(Poland) Jagiellonia Białystok	2–0	0–3	2–3

== Current squad ==
As of 12 September 2026

Note: Flags indicate national team as defined under FIFA eligibility rules; some limited exceptions apply. Players may hold more than one non-FIFA nationality.

No.	Pos.	Nation	Player
1	GK	BEL	Gaëtan Coucke
2	DF	GUI	Ibrahim Diakité
3	DF	BRA	Yago Lincoln
5	DF	CIV	Emmanuel Kakou
7	FW	BFA	Abdoul Kader Ouattara
8	MF	BRA	Erick Nunes
9	FW	FRA	Steve Ngoura
10	MF	CIV	Lazare Amani
11	MF	GER	Charles Herrmann
12	DF	CIV	Valy Konaté (on loan from Monaco)
13	FW	BEL	Dante Vanzeir (on loan from Gent)
15	DF	BEL	Gary Magnée
17	MF	ENG	Joel Ndala
18	MF	RSA	Luke Le Roux

No.	Pos.	Nation	Player
20	MF	GAM	Abdoulie Manneh (on loan from Mjällby)
21	GK	FRA	Yann Lienard (on loan from Monaco)
22	FW	FRA	Lucas Michal (on loan from Monaco)
24	DF	FRA	Geoffrey Kondo
28	MF	BEL	Hannes Van der Bruggen
30	FW	NGR	Tunde Akinsola
33	DF	COL	Royer Caicedo
41	FW	FRA	Krys Kouassi
42	MF	BEL	Lukas Mondele
45	DF	IRL	Tayo Adaramola
71	MF	BEL	Viggo Martens
75	DF	BEL	Sebbe Gheerardyns
84	GK	BEL	Bas Langenbick
91	GK	BEL	Tiemen De Bel

=== Out on loan ===
Note: Flags indicate national team as defined under FIFA eligibility rules; some limited exceptions apply. Players may hold more than one non-FIFA nationality.

No.	Pos.	Nation	Player
6	MF	GHA	Lawrence Agyekum (at Erzurumspor until 30 June 2027)
23	FW	MEX	Heriberto Jurado (at Puebla until 30 June 2027)

No.	Pos.	Nation	Player
—	GK	BEL	Maxime Delanghe (at Willem II until 30 June 2027)
—	DF	FRA	Dalangunypole Gomis (at Sochaux until 30 June 2027)

=== Jong Cercle ===
As of 5 February 2026

Note: Flags indicate national team as defined under FIFA eligibility rules; some limited exceptions apply. Players may hold more than one non-FIFA nationality.

No.	Pos.	Nation	Player
31	FW	MLI	Elhadji Koné
40	MF	BEL	Xander Martlé
60	DF	BEL	Arthur Leliaert
61	GK	BEL	Joren Op De Beeck
64	MF	BEL	Milan Vandeweghe
68	MF	BEL	Rayan El Bahri
70	MF	BEL	Stan De Baillie
72	MF	MAR	Shadi Guellet
73	FW	BEL	Lukas Rocha Torres
74	MF	BEL	Noah Gijdé
75	DF	BEL	Sebbe Gheerardyns
78	MF	BEL	Ono Vanackere
80	DF	BEL	Alexandre Antunes

No.	Pos.	Nation	Player
81	FW	BEL	Dré Callens
82	DF	BEL	Louis Colman
83	FW	BEL	Joaquin Obambi
84	GK	BEL	Bas Langenbick
85	MF	BEL	Lukas Campe
86	DF	BEL	Ilias Ben Sadik
88	DF	BEL	Sam Behaeghe
89	DF	CIV	Ibrahim Sy
91	DF	BEL	Emiel Vanden Borre
94	GK	BEL	Tiemen De Bel
95	GK	BEL	Nando Vanderspurt
97	DF	BEL	Senne Vanderhaeghen
98	MF	BEL	Runar Spitaels
-	MF	BFA	Emmanuel Ouedraogo

== Player history ==
Note: Please consider that the flags of each club's player not only indicate one's citizenship (jus soli principle), but a nationality as well (jus sanguinis principle).

=== Most appearances for Cercle Brugge ===
As of matches played 11 June 2011 and according to www.cerclemuseum.be

No.	Name	Career	Appearances	Goals
1	(Belgium) Jules Verriest	1965–81	492	8
2	(Belgium) Denis Viane	1997–2011	385	2
3	(Belgium) Geert Broeckaert	1978–91	376	19
4	(Belgium) Arthur Ruysschaert	1925–44	372	108
5	(Belgium) Roger Claeys	1941–57	362	48
6	(Belgium) Jackie De Caluwé	1951–66	354	32
7	(Belgium) Robert Braet	1928–48	352	0
8	(Belgium) Rudy Poorteman	1979–91	347	7
9	(Netherlands) Wim Kooiman	1980–88 / 1994–98	339	25
	(Netherlands) Bram van Kerkhof	1974–85	339	14

=== Most goals for Cercle Brugge ===
As of matches played 11 June 2011 and according to www.cerclemuseum.be

No.	Name	Career	Appearances	Goals
1	(Belgium) Marcel Pertry	1943–55	280	140
2	(Belgium) Josip Weber	1988–94	204	136
3	(Belgium) Dirk Beheydt	1975–84	295	115
4	(Belgium) Michel Vanderbauwhede	1920–32	231	109
5	(Belgium) Arthur Ruysschaert	1925–44	372	108
6	(Belgium) Gilbert Bailliu	1953–66	227	104
7	(Belgium) Louis Saeys	1903–27	305	103
8	(Belgium) Gérard Devos	1921–30	178	100
9	(Belgium) Alphonse Six	1907–12	89	93
10	(Belgium) André Saeys	1928–35 / 1941–42	172	55
	(Belgium) Eric Buyse	1959–70	265	55

=== Top league goalscorers per season ===
According to www.cerclemuseum.be. Names in italic means that only partial match history for the season could be retrieved.

Season	Player
1900–01	(Belgium) Edmond Verbruggen
1901–02	(Belgium) Jérôme De Caluwé
1902–03	(Belgium) Jérôme De Caluwé (Belgium) Joseph De Wulf (Belgium) Edmond Verbruggen (Belgium) Gustaaf Wardenier
1903–04	(Belgium) Joseph De Roo
1904–05	(Russian Empire) Vahram Kevorkian
1905–06	(Belgium) Louis Saeys
1906–07	(Belgium) Louis Saeys
1907–08	(Belgium) Louis Saeys
1908–09	(Belgium) Michel Nollet
1909–10	(Belgium) Alphonse Six
1910–11	(Belgium) Alphonse Six
1911–12	(Belgium) Alphonse Six
1912–13	(Belgium) Louis Saeys
1913–14	(Belgium) Frans Lowyck
1914–18	No competition organised due to World War I
1918–19	(Belgium) Louis Baes
1919–20	(Belgium) Germain Alleyn
1920–21	(Belgium) Frans Lowyck
1921–22	(Belgium) Gérard Devos
1922–23	(Belgium) Gérard Devos (Belgium) Célestin Nollet
1923–24	(Belgium) Michel Vanderbauwhede
1924–25	(Belgium) Gérard Devos
1925–26	(Belgium) Gérard Devos
1926–27	(Belgium) Gérard Devos
1927–28	(Belgium) Gérard Devos
1928–29	(Belgium) Gérard Devos
1929–30	(Belgium) Michel Vanderbauwhede
1930–31	(Belgium) Roger Proot
1931–32	(Belgium) Alphonse Decorte
1932–33	(Belgium) Alphonse Decorte (Belgium) Roger Proot
1933–34	(Belgium) Arthur Ruysschaert
1934–35	(Belgium) Maurice Blieck (Belgium) Arthur Ruysschaert (Belgium) Willy Van Loo
1935–36	(Belgium) Maurice Blieck
1936–37	(Belgium) Johan Vandenabeele
1937–38	(Belgium) Albert Naert
1938–39	(Belgium) André De Schepper
1939–41	No competition organised due to World War II

Season	Player
1941–42	(Belgium) Georges Crampe
1942–43	(Belgium) Albert De Kimpe
1943–44	(Belgium) Marcel Pertry
1944–45	No competition organised due to World War II
1945–46	(Belgium) Marcel Pertry
1946–47	(Belgium) Marcel Pertry
1947–48	(Belgium) Edmond Verté
1948–49	(Belgium) Marcel Pertry
1949–50	(Belgium) Marcel Pertry
1950–51	(Belgium) Marcel Pertry
1951–52	(Belgium) Georges Debbaut
1952–53	(Belgium) Pierre Roggeman
1953–54	(Belgium) Jozef Vandercruyssen
1954–55	(Belgium) Guy Thys
1955–56	(Belgium) François Loos
1956–57	(Belgium) François Loos (Belgium) Guy Thys
1957–58	(Belgium) André Perot
1958–59	(Belgium) Gilbert Bailliu
1959–60	(Belgium) Gilbert Bailliu
1960–61	(Belgium) Gilbert Bailliu
1961–62	(Belgium) Gilbert Bailliu
1962–63	(Belgium) Eric Daels
1963–64	(Belgium) Eric Daels
1964–65	(Belgium) Gilbert Bailliu
1965–66	(Belgium) Eric Buyse
1966–67	(Belgium) Roger Blieck (Belgium) Eric Buyse
1967–68	(Belgium) Roger Blieck
1968–69	(Brazil) Geo Carvalho
1969–70	(Belgium) Willy Van Acker
1970–71	(Belgium) Raf Lapeire
1971–72	(Denmark) Benny Nielsen
1972–73	(Belgium) Raf Lapeire
1973–74	(Belgium) Franky Vanhaecke
1974–75	(Belgium) Franky Vanhaecke
1975–76	(Belgium) Dirk Beheydt
1976–77	(Belgium) Dirk Beheydt
1977–78	(Netherlands) Gerrie Kleton
1978–79	(Belgium) Dirk Beheydt
1979–80	(Belgium) Dirk Beheydt
1980–81	(Belgium) Jan Simoen

Season	Player
1981–82	(Denmark) Søren Skov
1982–83	(Belgium) Dirk Beheydt
1983–84	(Belgium) Bernard Verheecke
1984–85	(Belgium) Paul Sanders
1985–86	(Australia) Edi Krncevic
1986–87	(Belgium) Patrick Ipermans (Belgium) Didier Wittebole
1987–88	(Zambia) Kalusha Bwalya
1988–89	(Belgium) Josip Weber
1989–90	(Belgium) Josip Weber
1990–91	(Belgium) Josip Weber
1991–92	(Belgium) Josip Weber
1992–93	(Belgium) Josip Weber
1993–94	(Belgium) Josip Weber
1994–95	(Belgium) Christophe Lauwers
1995–96	(Belgium) Christophe Lauwers
1996–97	(Hungary) Gábor Torma
1997–98	(Poland) Zbigniew Świętek
1998–99	(Poland) Ernest Konon
1999–00	(Brazil) Fabio Giuntini
2000–01	(Belgium) Giovanni Dekeyser
2001–02	(France) Stéphane Narayaninnaiken
2002–03	(Denmark) Ole Budtz
2003–04	(Belgium) Nordin Jbari
2004–05	(Belgium) Dieter Dekelver
2005–06	(Belgium) Dieter Dekelver
2006–07	(Serbia) Darko Pivaljević
2007–08	(Belgium) Stijn De Smet (Belgium) Tom De Sutter (Ukraine) Oleh Yashchuk
2008–09	(Ukraine) Oleh Yashchuk
2009–10	(Republic of Ireland) Dominic Foley
2010–11	(Brazil) Reynaldo
2011–12	(Angola) Rudy
2012–13	(Norway) Mushaga Bakenga
2013–14	(Democratic Republic of the Congo) Junior Kabananga
2014–15	(Democratic Republic of the Congo) Junior Kabananga
2015–16	(Guinea) Lonsana Doumbouya
2016–17	(Armenia) Ivan Yagan
2017–18	(France) Xavier Mercier
2018–19	(Belgium) Gianni Bruno
2019–20	(France) Kévin Hoggas (Belgium) Stef Peeters
2020–21	(Canada) Iké Ugbo

=== Pop Poll d'Echte ===
This prize is awarded by the club's supporters, in an election held by d'Echte, a Cercle Brugge supporters' association. The election is held in two rounds. At the last home game before the winter break, and at the last home game of the season, supporters can receive a paper and vote for three players. The player with most votes after the second round wins the Pop Poll. The main criteria taken into account are performances on the pitch and the players' love for the team.

Season	Winner
1972–73	(Denmark) Morten Olsen
1973–74	(Denmark) Morten Olsen
1974–75	(Denmark) Morten Olsen
1975–76	(Belgium) Dirk Beheydt
1976–77	(Belgium) Dirk Beheydt
1977–78	(Belgium) Jules Verriest
1978–79	(Belgium) Jules Verriest
1979–80	(Netherlands) Kees Krijgh
1980–81	(Belgium) Filip Schepens
1981–82	(Belgium) Alex Querter^{1}
1982–83	(Belgium) Paul Sanders
1983–84	(Netherlands) Leen Barth
1984–85	(Belgium) Geert Broeckaert
1985–86	(Socialist Federal Republic of Yugoslavia) Zoran Bojović

Season	Winner
1986–87	(Zambia) Kalusha Bwalya
1987–88	(Zambia) Kalusha Bwalya
1988–89	(Belgium) Geert Broeckaert
1989–90	(Belgium) Geert Broeckaert
1990–91	(Croatia) Josip Weber
1991–92	(Croatia) Josip Weber
1992–93	(Croatia) Josip Weber
1993–94	(Romania) Dorinel Munteanu
1994–95	(Belgium) Yves Feys
1995–96	(Belgium) Yves Feys
1996–97	(Belgium) Yves Feys
1997–98	(Ghana) Isaac Asare
1998–99	(Belgium) Philippe Piedfort
1999–00	(Sierra Leone) Mohamed Kanu

Season	Winner
2000–01	(Belgium) Giovanni Dekeyser
2001–02	(Belgium) Bram Vandenbussche
2002–03	(Sierra Leone) Mohamed Kanu
2003–04	(Belgium) Ricky Begeyn
2004–05	(Belgium) Denis Viane
2005–06	(Serbia) Darko Pivaljević
2006–07	(Togo) Christophe Grondin
2007–08	(Belgium) Tom De Sutter
2008–09	(Ukraine) Oleh Yashchuk
2009–10	(Ukraine) Oleh Yashchuk
2010–11	(Belgium) Bernt Evens
2011–12	(Belgium) Lukas Van Eenoo
2012–13	(Belgium) Bernt Evens
2013–14	(Belgium) Kristof D'Haene

Season	Winner
2014–15	(Belgium) Olivier Werner
2015–16	(Belgium) Mathieu Maertens
2016–17	(Armenia) Ivan Yagan
2017–18	(France) Xavier Mercier
2018–19	(France) Paul Nardi
2019–20	(Belgium) Thibo Somers
2020–21	(Belgium) Charles Vanhoutte

^{1} Alex Querter never received the award, because of his move to city rivals Club Brugge the same season. The organisers of the award concluded that Querter's decision failed to satisfy the criterion of "love for the team".

== Coaching staff ==
Position	Name	Nationality
Head coach	Pedro Caixinha	(Portugal)
Assistant coach	Jimmy De Wulf; Albin Sheqiri; Aurélien Collin	(Belgium) (Sweden) (France)
Goalkeeping coach	Stefan Toonen	(Netherlands)
Physical coach	Rudy Kalema	(Belgium)
Head of Analysis	Stuart Metcalf	(England)
Reserves coach	Jimmy De Wulf	(Belgium)
Reserves coach	Wouter Artz	(Netherlands)

=== Coaching history (since 1910) ===
- (Belgium) Joseph Dewulf (1910–14)
- (Belgium) Louis Saeys (1914–28)
- (Belgium) Florimond Vanhalme (1928–37)
- (Scotland) William Maxwell (1937–38)
- (Hungary) Hugo Fenichel (1938–40)
- (Belgium) Florimond Vanhalme (1940–41)
- (Belgium) Louis Saeys (1941–42)
- (Austria) Willy Steyskal (1942–44)
- (Belgium) Louis Baes (1944–46)
- (Belgium) André De Schepper (1946–48)
- (Belgium) Louis Baes (1948–50)
- (Belgium) Georges Vanden Bempt (1950–51)
- (Scotland) Bill Kennedy (1951–52)
- (Belgium) Louis Versyp (1952–54)
- (Belgium) Arthur Ruysschaert (a.i.)^{1} (1953–54)
- (Belgium) Guy Thys (1954–56)
- (Belgium) Louis Versyp (1956–57)
- (France) Edmond Delfour (1958–62)
- (France) Jules Bigot (1962–63)
- (France) Georges Meuris (1963–66)
- (France) Jules Van Dooren (1966–67)
- (Belgium) Urbain Braems (1967–72)
- (Netherlands) Han Grijzenhout (1972–77)
- (Greece) Lakis Petropoulos (1977–78)
- (Belgium) Lucien Masyn (1978)
- (Netherlands) Han Grijzenhout (1978–79)
- (Netherlands) Leo Canjels (1979–82)
- (Netherlands) Han Grijzenhout (1982–83)
- (Netherlands) Henk Houwaart (1983–84)
- (Netherlands) Bram van Kerkhof (1984)
- (Belgium) Georges Leekens (1984 – 30 June 1987)
- (Belgium) René Taelman (1987–88)
- (Belgium) Roland Rotty (1988–89)
- (Netherlands) Han Grijzenhout (1989–91)
- (Belgium) Eric Lagrou (1991)
- (Netherlands) Henk Houwaart (1 July 1991 – 30 June 1993)
- (Belgium) Georges Leekens (1 Nov 1993 – 30 June 1994)
- (Croatia) Jerko Tipurić (1994–97)
- (Belgium) Rudy Verkempinck (1997–98)
- (Belgium) Ronny Desmedt (1998–99)
- (Netherlands) Dennis Van Wijk (31 Oct 1998 – 30 June 2002)
- (Croatia) Jerko Tipurić (2002–04)
- (Netherlands) Harm Van Veldhoven (22 May 2004 – 30 June 2007)
- (Belgium) Glen De Boeck (1 July 2007 – 2010)
- (Belgium) Bob Peeters (27 May 2010 – 27 Oct 2012)
- (Belgium) Lorenzo Staelens (a.i.) (28 Oct 2012–5 Nov 2012??)
- (Netherlands) Foeke Booy (5 Nov 2012 – 4 April 2013)
- (Belgium) Lorenzo Staelens (2013–2014)
- (Iceland) Arnar Viðarsson (2014–2015)
- (Netherlands) Dennis Van Wijk (2015)
- (Belgium) Frederik Vanderbiest (2015–2016)
- (Belgium) Vincent Euvrard (2016)
- (Belgium) José Riga (2016–2017)
- (Belgium) Franky Vercauteren (2017-2018)
- (France) Laurent Guyot (2018–2019)
- (France) Fabien Mercadal (1 July 2019 – 7 Oct 2019)
- (Germany) Bernd Storck (12 Oct 2019 – 31 May 2020)
- (England) Paul Clement (3 July 2020 – 1 Feb 2021)
- (Belgium) Yves Vanderhaeghe (1 Feb 2021 - 28 Nov 2021)
- (Austria) Dominik Thalhammer (28 Nov 2021 - 19 Sep 2022)
- (Austria) Miron Muslić (19 Sep 2022 - 2 Dec 2024)
- (Belgium) Jimmy De Wulf (a.i.) (2 Dec 2024 - 10 Dec 2024)
- (Austria) Ferdinand Feldhofer (10 Dec 2024 - 17 March 2025)
- (Belgium) Jimmy De Wulf (21 March 2025 - 12 May 2025)
- (Germany) Bernd Storck (12 May 2025 - 19 June 2025)
- (Germany) Onur Cinel (19 June 2025 - 18 Mar 2026)
- (Belgium) Jimmy De Wulf (a.i.) (18 Mar 2026 - 23 Mar 2026)
- (Denmark) Lars Friis (23 Mar 2026 - 3 Nov 2026)
- (Portugal) Pedro Caixinha (3 Nov 2026 -)

Notes:

1. Ruysschaert replaced the suspended Versyp for a few months.

== Chairmen history ==
Date	Name
1899–05	(Belgium) Leon De Meester
1905–07	(Belgium) Raoul Daufresne de la Chevalerie
1907–09	(Belgium) Leon De Meester
1909–11	(Belgium) Albéric de Formanoir de la Cazerie
1911–25	(Belgium) René de Peellaert
1927–37	(Belgium) Paul Dautricourt
1937–50	(Belgium) Edgard De Smedt

Date	Name
1950–53	(Belgium) Yves Dautricourt
1953–67	(Belgium) Pierre Vandamme
1967–70	(Belgium) Robert Braet
1970–02	(Belgium) Paul Ducheyne
2002–11	(Belgium) Frans Schotte
2012–2015	(Belgium) Paul Vanhaecke
2015–2020	(Belgium) Frans Schotte
2020–2023	(Belgium) Vincent Goemaere
2023–present	(Belgium) Thomas Tousseyn

== See also ==
- Bruges derby
