= 1925–26 in Belgian football =

Football in Belgium
- Season: 1925–26

The 1925–26 season was the 26th season of competitive football in Belgium. Beerschot AC won their 4th Division I title, which was also their 3rd consecutive Belgian title. At the end of the season, SC Anderlechtois, CS Verviétois and R Tilleur FC were relegated to the Promotion, while RC de Bruxelles, FC Malinois and CS La Forestoise were promoted.
For season 1926-27, major changes were brought to the league system. Division I was renamed Division d'Honneur (French for Premier Division), Promotion was renamed Division I with one division of 14 teams (instead of 2) and a third level was introduced, named Promotion and played as 3 divisions of 14 teams each. The bottom two teams in Division d'Honneur would be relegated to Division I (with the top two in Division I promoted, while the bottom 3 teams in Division I would be relegated to the Promotion, with the winners of the 3 Promotion divisions would be promoted to Division I.
Also, the Belgian Cup was played for the first time since World War I.

== National team ==
Date	Venue	Opponents	Score*	Comp	Belgium scorers	Match Report
December 13, 1925	Stade du Pont d'Ougrée, Liège (H)	Austria	3-4	F	Ivan Thys, Maurice Gillis, Raymond Braine	FA website
February 14, 1926	Oscar Bossaert Stadium, Brussels (H)	Hungary	0-2	F		FA website
March 14, 1926	Bosuilstadion, Antwerp (H)	The Netherlands	1-1	F	Ferdinand Adams	FA website
April 11, 1926	Pershing, Paris (A)	France	3-4	F	Michel Vanderbauwhede, Ivan Thys, Gérard Devos	FA website
May 2, 1926	Sportpark Oud-Roosenburgh, Amsterdam (A)	The Netherlands	5-1	F	Raymond Braine (2), Jan Diddens, Ferdinand Adams, Maurice Gillis	FA website
May 24, 1926	Olympisch Stadion, Antwerp (H)	England	3-5	F	Ivan Thys, Raymond Braine (2)	FA website
June 20, 1926	Oscar Bossaert Stadium, Brussels (H)	France	2-2	F	Maurice Gillis, Ferdinand Adams	FA website

* Belgium score given first

Key

- H = Home match
- A = Away match
- N = On neutral ground
- F = Friendly
- o.g. = own goal

== Honours ==
Competition	Winner
Division I	Beerschot AC
Promotion	RC de Bruxelles and FC Malinois

== Final league tables ==
=== Promotion ===
==== Promotion A ====
Pos	Team	Pld	Won	Drw	Lst	GF	GA	GD	Pts	Notes
1	RC de Bruxelles	26	20	5	1	96	22	+74	45	Promoted to Premier Division
2	CS La Forestoise	26	18	2	6	71	47	+24	38	Promoted to Premier Division
3	FC Turnhout	26	17	4	5	88	31	+57	38	
4	White Star AC	26	13	4	9	51	40	+11	30	
5	Saint-Ignace SC Antwerpen	26	13	3	10	83	57	+26	29	
6	Oude God Sport	26	11	7	8	52	46	+6	29	
7	SRU Verviers	26	11	5	10	50	53	-3	27	
8	Stade Louvaniste	26	10	5	11	68	69	-1	25	Relegated to form Promotion
9	Courtrai Sports	26	11	3	12	47	48	-1	25	Relegated to form Promotion
10	AS Renaisienne	26	10	5	11	42	64	-22	25	Relegated to form Promotion
11	FC Sérésien	26	9	5	12	52	66	-14	23	Relegated to form Promotion
12	RC de Vottem	26	7	3	16	39	81	-42	17	Relegated to form Promotion
13	ESC de Bruxelles	26	3	1	22	36	86	-50	7	Relegated to form Promotion
14	US Tournaisienne	26	2	2	22	27	94	-67	6	Relegated to form Promotion

==== Promotion B ====
Pos	Team	Pld	Won	Drw	Lst	GF	GA	Pts	GD	Notes
1	FC Malinois	26	21	1	4	106	32	43	+74	Promoted to Premier Division
2	Boom FC	26	16	5	5	53	34	37	+19	
3	Liersche SK	26	15	3	8	61	51	33	+10	
4	Uccle Sport	26	14	4	8	80	57	32	+23	
5	AS Herstalienne	26	14	3	9	56	46	31	+10	
6	RFC Liégeois	26	11	7	8	64	35	29	+29	
7	TSV Lyra	26	11	7	8	42	25	29	+17	
8	CS Tongrois	26	10	9	7	54	51	29	+3	Relegated to form Promotion
9	AS Ostendaise	26	10	5	11	46	57	25	-11	Relegated to form Promotion
10	R Léopold Club de Bruxelles	26	8	2	16	55	73	18	-19	Relegated to form Promotion
11	SR Dolhain FC	26	6	4	16	37	74	16	-37	Relegated to form Promotion
12	Albert Elisabeth Club de Mons	26	5	5	16	49	78	15	-29	Relegated to form Promotion
13	Vanneste Genootschap Oostende	26	3	7	16	35	75	13	-40	Relegated to form Promotion
14	Vilvorde FC	26	4	5	17	39	84	13	-45	Relegated to form Promotion
