= Frans Lowyck =

Belgian footballer

Personal information
- Full name: François Jean Julien Lowyck
- Date of birth: 1 September 1894
- Place of birth: Bruges, Belgium
- Date of death: 10 March 1969 (aged 74)
- Place of death: Bruges, Belgium
- Position: Forward

Youth career
- Cercle Brugge

Senior career*
Years	Team	Apps	(Gls)
1912–1926	Cercle Brugge	67	(49)

Managerial career
- VG Oostende
- * Club domestic league appearances and goals as of 24 October 2009 ‡ National team caps and goals as of 24 October 2009

François Jean Julien Lowyck (born 1 September 1894 in Bruges - 10 March 1969 in Bruges) was a Belgian football player. His position on the field was forward.

Throughout his career, Lowyck only played for one team: Cercle Brugge. He made his debut in the 1912-13 season. That same season, Cercle Brugge lost the cup final. Only one season later, Lowyck would already become top scorer of the team. He would repeat this event in 1921, after the interruption due to World War I.

Frans Lowyck quit playing football the season before Cercle Brugge's second national championship and cup final victory.

Sporting positions
Preceded by (Belgium) Louis Saeys	Cercle Brugge top scorer 1914	Succeeded by (Belgium) Louis Baes
Preceded by (Belgium) Germain Alleyn	Cercle Brugge top scorer 1921	Succeeded by (Belgium) Gérard Devos
