= 1948–49 in Belgian football =

Football in Belgium
- Season: 1948–49

The 1948–49 season was the 46th season of competitive football in Belgium. RSC Anderlechtois won their second Premier Division title.
The Belgium national football team played 6 friendly games, of which they won 2 and drew 4.

== Overview ==
At the end of the season, K Boom FC and RU Saint-Gilloise were relegated to Division I, while R Stade Louvain (Division I A winner) and RFC Brugeois (Division I B winner) were promoted to the Premier Division.
RCS La Forestoise, Stade Waremmien, SK Roeselare and RRC Tournaisien were relegated from Division I to Promotion, to be replaced by R Albert Elisabeth Club Mons, ASV Oostende KM, AS Herstalienne and RU Hutoise FC.

== National team ==
Date	Venue	Opponents	Score*	Comp	Belgium scorers
October 17, 1948	Stade Olympique de Colombes, Colombes (A)	France	3-3	F	Joseph Mermans, Léopold Anoul, Frédéric Chaves d'Aguilar
November 21, 1948	Bosuilstadion, Antwerp (H)	The Netherlands	1-1	F	Frédéric Chaves d'Aguilar
January 2, 1949	Estadi Olímpic de Montjuïc, Barcelona (A)	Spain	1-1	F	Henri Coppens
March 13, 1949	Olympic Stadium, Amsterdam (A)	The Netherlands	3-3	F	Hennie Moring (o.g.), Joseph Mermans (2)
April 24, 1949	Dalymount Park, Dublin (A)	Republic of Ireland	2-0	F	Victor Lemberechts, Joseph Mermans
May 22, 1949	Stade de Sclessin, Liège (H)	Wales	3-1	F	Henri Govard (2), Albert De Hert

* Belgium score given first

Key

- H = Home match
- A = Away match
- N = On neutral ground
- F = Friendly
- o.g. = own goal

== Honours ==
Competition	Winner
Premier Division	RSC Anderlechtois
Division I	R Stade Louvain and RFC Brugeois
Promotion	R Albert Elisabeth Club Mons, ASV Oostende KM, AS Herstalienne and RU Hutoise FC

== Final league tables ==
=== Premier Division ===
Top scorer: René Thirifays (R Charleroi SC) with 26 goals.
