= Michel Vanderbauwhede =

Belgian footballer

Personal information
- Full name: Michel Vanderbauwhede
- Date of birth: 19 May 1901
- Place of birth: Boezinge, Belgium
- Date of death: 3 July 1977 (aged 76)
- Place of death: Ypres, Belgium
- Position: Striker

Senior career*
Years	Team	Apps	(Gls)
1920–1932	Cercle Brugge	224	(105)
- Cercle Ieper

International career^{‡}
1926–30	Belgium	15	(7)
- * Club domestic league appearances and goals as of 10 May 2008 ‡ National team caps and goals as of 15 June 2007

Michel Vanderbauwhede (19 May 1901, Boezinge - 3 July 1977, Ypres) was a Belgian football player. He was a striker.

Vanderbauwhede made his debut at the highest level of Belgian football in 1920. He played with Cercle Brugge in an away win against AA Gent. With Cercle, he also won the league twice (1927, 1930) and the cup once (1927).

With his 109 goals in 231 appearances, Vanderbauwhede is the 4th best goal scorer in the history of Cercle Brugge.

Michel Vanderbauwhede also played 15 times for Belgium. He made his debut on 11 April 1926, in an away match against France. Belgium lost 4–3. Vanderbauwhede scored his first of seven international goals in this match.

Sporting positions
Preceded by (Belgium) Gérard Devos (Belgium) Célestin Nollet	Cercle Brugge top scorer 1924	Succeeded by (Belgium) Gérard Devos
Preceded by (Belgium) Gérard Devos	Cercle Brugge top scorer 1930	Succeeded by (Belgium) Roger Proot
