= 1926–27 in Belgian football =

Football in Belgium
- Season: 1926–27

The 1926–27 season was the 27th season of competitive football in Belgium. This was the first season after the major reform of Belgian football. The Belgian Cup was first played since World War I and won by RCS Brugeois. They also won the Premier Division making the second double in Belgian football after Union Saint-Gilloise in 1912-13. R Liersche SK won the Division I now the second level of football and thus promoted for the next Premier Division along with the runner-up SC Anderlechtois. Both clubs replaced FC Malinois and CS La Forestoise at the highest level. A third level of football was introduced, named Promotion and played in 3 leagues of 14 clubs. The leagues were won by Courtrai Sports, CS Tongrois and Fléron FC. All 3 clubs promoted to the Division I, while AS Herstalienne, Saint-Ignace SC Antwerpen and SRU Verviers were all relegated to the Promotion.

== National team ==
Date	Venue	Opponents	Score*	Comp	Belgium scorers	Match Report
January 2, 1927	Stade de Sclessin, Liège (H)	Czechoslovakia	2-3	F	Henri Bierna, Maurice Gillis	FA website
March 13, 1927	Bosuilstadion, Antwerp (H)	The Netherlands	2-0	F	Henri Bierna, Ferdinand Adams	FA website
April 3, 1927	Stade de la Butte, Brussels (H)	Sweden	2-1	F	Raymond Braine, Ferdinand Adams	FA website
May 1, 1927	Sportpark Oud-Roosenburgh, Amsterdam (A)	The Netherlands	2-3	F	Jan Diddens, Raymond Braine	FA website
May 11, 1927	Oscar Bossaert Stadium, Brussels (H)	England	1-9	F	Florimond Van Halme	FA website
May 22, 1927	Hohe Warte Stadium, Vienna (A)	Austria	1-4	F	Pierre Braine	FA website
May 26, 1927	Letna Stadium, Prague (A)	Czechoslovakia	0-4	F		FA website

* Belgium score given first

Key

- H = Home match
- A = Away match
- N = On neutral ground
- F = Friendly
- o.g. = own goal

== Honours ==
Competition	Winner
Premier Division	RCS Brugeois
Belgian Cup	RCS Brugeois
Division I	R Liersche SK
Promotion	Courtrai Sports, CS Tongrois and Fléron FC

== Final league tables ==
=== Division I ===
Pos	Team	Pld	Won	Drw	Lst	GF	GA	Pts	GD	Notes
1	R Liersche SK	26	17	6	3	63	33	40	+30	Promoted to Premier Division.
2	SC Anderlechtois	26	16	6	4	76	42	38	+34	Promoted to Premier Division.
3	Tilleur FC	26	13	4	9	62	47	30	+15	
4	Uccle Sport	26	13	3	10	70	51	29	+21	
5	RFC Liégeois	26	10	9	7	39	36	29	+3	
6	FC Turnhout	26	13	2	11	52	47	28	+5	
7	CS Verviétois	26	11	3	12	56	55	25	+1	
8	Boom FC	26	10	5	11	45	63	25	-18	
9	TSV Lyra	26	9	5	12	45	49	23	-4	
10	White Star AC	26	9	5	12	40	44	23	-4	
11	Oude God Sport	26	8	6	12	46	54	22	-8	
12	AS Herstalienne	26	6	8	12	42	52	20	-10	Relegated to Promotion
13	Saint-Ignace SC Antwerpen	26	9	1	16	44	68	19	-24	Relegated to Promotion
14	SRU Verviers	26	4	5	17	35	74	13	-39	Relegated to Promotion
