= 1921–22 in Belgian football =

Football in Belgium
- Season: 1921–22

The 1921–22 season was the 22nd season of competitive football in Belgium.

== Overview ==
Beerschot AC won the Division I. At the end of the season, FC Malinois and RC de Gand were relegated to the Promotion, while Uccle Sport and Berchem Sport were promoted.

== National team ==
Date	Venue	Opponents	Score*	Comp	Belgium scorers	Match Report
October 9, 1921	San Mamés Stadium, Bilbao (A)	Spain	0-2	F		FA website
January 15, 1922	Stade Olympique de Colombes, Paris (A)	France	1-2	F	Georges Michel	FA website
March 26, 1922	Olympisch Stadion, Antwerp (H)	The Netherlands	4-0	F	Henri Larnoe (2), Jacques Vandevelde, Robert Coppée	FA website
April 15, 1922	Stade Vélodrome Oscar Flesch, Liège (H)	Denmark	0-0	F		FA website
May 7, 1922	Sportpark, Amsterdam (A)	The Netherlands	2-1	F	Georges Michel, own goal	FA website
May 21, 1922	Viale Lombardia, Milan (A)	Italy	2-4	F	Henri Larnoe, Maurice Gillis	FA website

* Belgium score given first

Key

- H = Home match
- A = Away match
- N = On neutral ground
- F = Friendly
- o.g. = own goal

== Honours ==
Competition	Winner
Division I	Beerschot AC
Promotion	Uccle Sport

== Final league tables ==
=== Promotion ===
Pos	Team	Pld	Won	Drw	Lst	GF	GA	Pts	GD	Notes
1	Uccle Sport	26	17	7	2	50	28	41	+22	Promoted to First Division.
2	Berchem Sport	26	18	4	4	57	28	40	+29	Promoted to First Division.
3	RFC Liégeois	26	15	5	6	49	25	35	+24	
4	Liersche SK	26	15	5	6	50	28	35	+22	
5	Stade Louvaniste	26	9	8	9	34	30	26	+4	
6	Tilleur FC	26	9	8	9	50	50	26	0	
7	TSV Lyra	26	10	5	11	38	37	25	+1	
8	FC de Bressoux	26	9	5	12	38	40	23	-2	
9	Léopold Club de Bruxelles	26	9	3	14	46	58	21	-12	
10	EFC Hasselt	26	8	5	13	38	52	21	-14	
11	CS La Forestoise	26	6	8	12	30	43	20	-13	
12	Courtrai Sport	26	8	4	14	26	42	20	-16	
13	Boom FC	26	6	6	14	47	60	18	-13	
14	Fléron FC	26	4	5	17	23	55	13	-32	
