= Roger Proot =

Belgian footballer (1905–1971)

Personal information
- Full name: Roger Proot
- Date of birth: 21 November 1905
- Place of birth: Woumen, Belgium
- Date of death: 29 September 1971 (aged 65)
- Place of death: Bruges, Belgium
- Position: Forward

Youth career
- Cercle Brugge

Senior career*
Years	Team	Apps	(Gls)
1924–1937	Cercle Brugge	145	(49)
- AS Oostende

International career^{‡}
	Belgium	0	(0)
- * Club domestic league appearances and goals as of 24 October 2009 ‡ National team caps and goals as of 24 October 2009

Roger Proot (born 21 November 1905 in Woumen - died 29 September 1971 in Bruges) was a Belgian football player. His position on the field was forward, although he also could function as back-up goalkeeper.

Proot made his debut at the highest level of Belgian football in a 2–1 home win with Cercle Brugge against Standard de Liège, on 14 December 1924. Roger Proot would play most of his career for Cercle. His main achievements with the green and black Bruges side were the national championship victories in 1927 and 1930, and the 1926-27 cup final win. Proot also became twice top scorer of the team, in 1931 and 1933. After Cercle Brugge were relegated to second division in 1936, Proot stayed for one more season. His last match for Cercle was an 8–0 away loss against Duffel, on 17 April 1937.

Roger Proot ended his career with the Belgian coast team AS Oostende.

Sporting positions
Preceded by (Belgium) Michel Vanderbauwhede	Cercle Brugge top scorer 1931	Succeeded by (Belgium) Alphonse Decorte
Preceded by (Belgium) Alphonse Decorte	Cercle Brugge top scorer 1933^{1}^{1}alongside Alphonse Decorte	Succeeded by (Belgium) Arthur Ruysschaert
