= Geert Broeckaert =

Belgian footballer and coach

Personal information
- Full name: Geert Broeckaert
- Date of birth: 15 November 1960 (age 65)
- Place of birth: Zottegem, Belgium
- Position: Midfielder

Team information
- Current team: RAEC Mons

Youth career
- AA Gent

Senior career*
Years	Team	Apps	(Gls)
1978–1991	Cercle Brugge	336	(18)
- Exc. Mouscron

International career^{‡}
1990	Belgium	1	(0)

Managerial career
- Exc. Mouscron (assistant)
- Exc. Mouscron (youth coach)
- Exc. Mouscron
- Exc. Mouscron (youth coach)
- Exc. Mouscron
- Exc. Mouscron (assistant)
- 2009: RAEC Mons (assistant)
- 2009–: RAEC Mons
- * Club domestic league appearances and goals as of 16 March 2008 ‡ National team caps and goals as of 16 March 2008

Geert Broeckaert (Flemish pronunciation: [ɣeːrd ˈbrukaːrt]; (Note: In isolation, Geert is pronounced [ɣeːrt].) born 15 November 1960) is a former Belgian professional football player and a football coach.

== Career ==
Broeckaert was a youth product of AA Gent, but at the age of 17 he moved to Cercle Brugge after his father had bought off his contract. He would eventually stay 13 years in Bruges and play 375 matches for the green and black team, the second-most someone ever has played for Cercle. Jules Verriest holds this record with 492 matches played. Broeckaert also won the Cercle Brugge Pop Poll 3 times. This is a record he shares with Morten Olsen, Josip Weber and Yves Feys.

=== Position ===
He used to be a technically strong midfielder.

== International career ==
In 1990, Geert Broeckaert played his only match for Belgium, a 0–2 loss against East Germany. This also was the last ever played match of the East Germany national team.

== Coaching career ==
In 1991, Broeckaert moved to Exc. Mouscron, where he was manager, assistant manager and youth coach. Due to the financial uncertainty at Mouscron, Broeckaert signed for RAEC Mons to become assistant manager for Rudy Cossey. Franky Vandendriessche made this same move only a bit earlier.
