= Alphonse Decorte =

Belgian footballer

Personal information
- Full name: Alphonse Emile Pierre Decorte
- Date of birth: 2 August 1909
- Place of birth: Bruges, Belgium
- Date of death: 31 May 1977 (aged 67)
- Place of death: Bruges, Belgium
- Position: Forward

Youth career
- Cercle Brugge

Senior career*
Years	Team	Apps	(Gls)
1927–1936	Cercle Brugge	83	(35)
- * Club domestic league appearances and goals as of 24 October 2009 ‡ National team caps and goals as of 24 October 2009

Alphonse Emile Pierre Decorte (2 August 1909, in Bruges – 31 May 1977, in Bruges) was a Belgian footballer. His position on the field was forward.

Throughout his career, Decorte only played for one team: Cercle Brugge. He made his debut in the 1927–28 season, right after Cercle Brugge's national championship and cup final victory. In Decorte's first match, Cercle lost 5–1 at the pitch of Beerschot. Even though Decorte never really became a first team regular, he managed twice to become top scorer of the team, in 1932 and 1933. He also became national champions with Cercle in the 1929–30 season.

Alphonse Decorte played his last match for Cercle against Daring Club de Bruxelles on 29 December 1935. Cercle lost the match 1–6. Cercle would eventually relegate that season.

Sporting positions
Preceded by (Belgium) Roger Proot	Cercle Brugge top scorer 1932–1933^{1}^{1}alongside Roger Proot	Succeeded by (Belgium) Arthur Ruysschaert
