= 1951–52 in Belgian football =

Football in Belgium
- Season: 1951–52

The 1951–52 season was the 49th season of competitive football in Belgium. RFC Liégeois won their 4th Premier Division title. This was the last season before the 1952 reform of the national competitions. From the next season on, a new level of football was introduced to the league system. The divisions were also renamed, with the top level being named Division I (one league of 16 teams), the second level Division II (one league of 16 teams), the 3rd level Division III (2 leagues of 16 teams each) and the lowest level remaining the Promotion (4 leagues of 16 teams each). The Belgium national football team played 6 friendly games (3 wins, 3 losses).

== Overview ==
At the end of the season, RUS Tournaisienne and RRC de Bruxelles were relegated to Division II, while RRC de Gand (Division I A winner) and Beringen FC (Division I B winner) were promoted to Division I.

The teams placed 2nd to 8th in each league of the former Division I formed the new Division II (2nd level).

The clubs placed 9th to 15th in each league of the former Division I were relegated to the new Division III (3rd level), along with the top 4 teams from each league of the former Promotion, as well as 2 winners from play-offs between the 4 5th-placed teams (SK Beveren-Waas and R. Herve F.C. The Promotion was won by UR Namur, RRC Tournaisien, K Tubantia FC and K Patria FC Tongeren.

Finally, the new Promotion (4th level) was formed from the 2 bottom teams (US Centre and RFC Bressoux) of the former Division I, the 6th to 16th teams of the former Promotion, the 2 losers of the playoff between the 5th-placed teams of the former Promotion (R Léopold Club Hornu and K Willebroekse SV) as well as 16 new teams.

== National team ==
Date	Venue	Opponents	Score*	Comp	Belgium scorers
October 14, 1951	Heysel Stadium, Brussels (H)	Austria	1-8	F	Victor Lemberechts
November 25, 1951	Feijenoord Stadion, Rotterdam (A)	The Netherlands	7-6	F	Léopold Anoul (3), Louis Verbruggen, José Moes (2), Jan Van Steen
February 24, 1952	Heysel Stadium, Brussels (H)	Italy	2-0	F	José Moes (2)
March 23, 1952	Praterstadion, Vienna (A)	Austria	0-2	F
April 6, 1952	Bosuilstadion, Antwerp (H)	The Netherlands	4-2	F	Léopold Anoul, Henri Coppens (2), Victor Lemberechts
May 22, 1952	Heysel Stadium, Brussels (H)	France	1-2	F	Joseph Mermans

* Belgium score given first

Key

- H = Home match
- A = Away match
- N = On neutral ground
- F = Friendly
- o.g. = own goal

== Honours ==
Competition	Winner
Premier Division	RFC Liégeois
Division I	RRC de Gand and Beringen FC
Promotion	UR Namur, RRC Tournaisien, K Tubantia FC and K Patria FC Tongeren

== Final league tables ==
=== Premier Division ===
Top scorer: Henri Coppens (R Beerschot AC) with 23 goals.
