= 1954–55 in Belgian football =

Football in Belgium
- Season: 1954–55

The 1954–55 season was the 52nd season of competitive football in Belgium. RSC Anderlechtois won their 6th Division I title and thus became the first Belgian club to enter European competitions as the European Champion Clubs' Cup was first played in 1955-56. The Belgium national football team played 6 friendly games (2 wins, 1 draw, 3 losses). The first Belgian Golden Shoe was awarded in 1955 for the best Belgian played during the 1954 year. Henri Coppens of R Beerschot AC won the trophy.

== Overview ==
At the end of the season, RRC de Bruxelles and OC Charleroi were relegated to Division II and were replaced by Division II winner R Daring Club de Bruxelles and runner-up K Beeringen FC.
The bottom 2 clubs in Division II (KFC Izegem and RRC de Gand) were relegated to Division III while both Division III winners (KFC Herentals and RRC Tournaisien) qualified for Division II.
The bottom 2 clubs of each Division III league were relegated to Promotion: K Patria FC Tongeren, Stade Waremmien FC, KVG Oostende and K Sint-Niklaasse SK, to be replaced by Mol Sport, SCUP Jette, RCS Hallois and KVK Waaslandia Burcht from Promotion.

== National team ==
Date	Venue	Opponents	Score*	Comp	Belgium scorers
September 26, 1954	Heysel Stadium, Brussels (H)	Germany	2-0	F	Henri Coppens, Léopold Anoul
October 24, 1954	Bosuilstadion, Antwerp (H)	The Netherlands	4-3	F	Victor Lemberechts, Henri Coppens (2), Denis Houf
November 11, 1954	Stade Olympique, Colombes (A)	France	2-2	F	Robert Jonquet (o.g.), Victor Lemberechts
January 16, 1955	Stadio della Vittoria, Bari (A)	Italy	0-1	F
April 3, 1955	Olympic Stadium, Amsterdam (A)	The Netherlands	0-1	F
June 5, 1955	Heysel Stadium, Brussels (H)	Czechoslovakia	1-3	F	Svatopluk Pluskal (o.g.)

* Belgium score given first

Key

- H = Home match
- A = Away match
- N = On neutral ground
- F = Friendly
- o.g. = own goal

== Honours ==
Competition	Winner
Division I	RSC Anderlechtois
Cup	R Antwerp FC
Division II	R Daring Club de Bruxelles
Division III	KFC Herentals and RRC Tournaisien
Promotion	Mol Sport, SCUP Jette, RCS Hallois and KVK Waaslandia Burcht

== Final league tables ==
=== Premier Division ===
- 1954-55 Top scorer: Henri Coppens (R Beerschot AC) with 35 goals.
- 1954 Golden Shoe: Henri Coppens (R Beerschot AC)
