= 1950–51 in Belgian football =

Football in Belgium
- Season: 1950–51

The 1950–51 season was the 48th season of competitive football in Belgium. RSC Anderlechtois won their 4th and 3rd consecutive Premier Division title
The Belgium national football team played 6 friendly games, with 1 win, 3 draws and 2 losses.

== Overview ==
At the end of the season, Beringen FC and RFC Brugeois were relegated to Division I, while RU Saint-Gilloise (Division I A winner) and RUS Tournaisienne (Division I B winner) were promoted to the Premier Division.
RU Hutoise FC, EFC Hasselt, SC Eendracht Aalst and K Tubantia FC were relegated from Division I to Promotion, to be replaced by Daring Club Leuven, RRC de Gand, Waterschei SV Thor and Rupel SK.

== National team ==
Date	Venue	Opponents	Score*	Comp	Belgium scorers
November 1, 1950	Stade Olympique de Colombes, Colombes (A)	France	3-3	F	Victor Lemberechts, Joseph Mermans (2)
November 12, 1950	Bosuilstadion, Antwerp (H)	The Netherlands	7-2	F	Victor Lemberechts (3), Joseph Mermans (2), Léopold Anoul (2)
April 15, 1951	Olympic Stadium, Amsterdam (A)	The Netherlands	4-5	F	Rinus Terlouw (o.g.), Joseph Mermans, Frédéric Chaves d'Aguilar, Arsène Vaillant
May 20, 1951	Heysel Stadium, Brussels (H)	Scotland	0-5	F
June 10, 1951	Heysel Stadium, Brussels (H)	Spain	3-3	F	Raymond Van Gestel (2), August Van Steelant
June 17, 1951	Estádio Nacional, Oeiras (A)	Portugal	1-1	F	Joseph Givard

* Belgium score given first

Key

- H = Home match
- A = Away match
- N = On neutral ground
- F = Friendly
- o.g. = own goal

== Honours ==
Competition	Winner
Premier Division	RSC Anderlechtois
Division I	RU Saint-Gilloise and RUS Tournaisienne
Promotion	Daring Club Leuven, RRC de Gand, Waterschei SV Thor and Rupel SK

== Final league tables ==
=== Premier Division ===
Top scorer: Albert De Hert (R Berchem Sport) with 27 goals.
