= Gérard Devos =

Belgian footballer

Personal information
- Full name: Gérard Devos
- Date of birth: 19 August 1903
- Place of birth: Sint-Andries (Bruges), Belgium
- Date of death: 5 January 1972 (aged 68)
- Place of death: Tielt, Belgium
- Position: Striker

Youth career
- Cercle Brugge

Senior career*
Years	Team	Apps	(Gls)
1921–1929	Cercle Brugge	176	(97)
- FC Eeklo

International career^{‡}
1926–1928	Belgium	7	(1)

Managerial career
- FC Eeklo
- * Club domestic league appearances and goals as of 20 June 2008 ‡ National team caps and goals as of 20 June 2008

Gérard Devos (19 August 1903, Sint-Andries – 5 January 1972, Tielt) was a Belgian football striker.

== Career ==
Devos started playing football with Cercle Brugge. He made his debut in a 5–1 loss against Standard Liège on 23 October 1921. He played most of his career for the green and black side. He was 7 times the team's top goal scorer, and he also has the 8th most goals in the history of Cercle.

Devos won the league title with Cercle in 1927. His last match with Cercle was against Antwerp FC on 3 November 1929. Cercle lost 1–4. Devos ended his career with FC Eeklo, where he would also become manager.

Devos appeared 9 times in the colours of Belgium. He was capped for the first time against France on 11 April 1926. Belgium lost 4–3. Devos made one of the three Belgian goals. He was also called up for Belgium at the 1928 Summer Olympics.

Sporting positions
Preceded by (Belgium) Frans Lowyck	Cercle Brugge top scorer 1922 – 1923^{1}^{1}alongside Célestin Nollet	Succeeded by (Belgium) Michel Vanderbauwhede
Preceded by (Belgium) Michel Vanderbauwhede	Cercle Brugge top scorer 1925 – 1926 – 1927 – 1928 – 1929	Succeeded by (Belgium) Michel Vanderbauwhede
