= Louis Saeys =

Belgian footballer

Personal information
- Full name: Louis Saeys
- Date of birth: 26 November 1887
- Place of birth: Bruges, Belgium
- Date of death: 2 June 1952 (aged 64)
- Place of death: Bruges, Belgium
- Position: Forward

Youth career
- Cercle Brugge

Senior career*
Years	Team	Apps	(Gls)
1903–1927	Cercle Brugge	302	(101)

International career^{‡}
1907–14	Belgium	24	(9)

Managerial career
- 1914–1928: Cercle Brugge
- 1941–1942: Cercle Brugge
- * Club domestic league appearances and goals as of 15 January 2008 ‡ National team caps and goals as of 15 January 2008

Louis Saeys (26 November 1887 – 2 June 1952) was a Belgian football striker. He has played 24 times for the Belgian team and has the 7th most goals for Cercle Brugge. Saeys would probably have been Cercles leading top scorer of all time and player with most appearances if war had not broken out, which stopped the Belgian football competition for 5 seasons.

Saeys played for no other team than Cercle throughout his career. He made his début for the first team in the 1903–04 season. Saeys would rapidly become one of the key players for the green and black side, despite his young age. Four years later, he would be called up for the first time to play for his country. In the 1910–11 season, Saeys became national champions with the green and black side. Louis Saeys was part of the team that played the cup final in 1913. The match was lost 3–2 against Union SG, after extra time. It was the first time that extra time was added, as the score after 90 minutes still was 2–2. Belgian football officials decided on the spot that an extra 30 minutes would have to be played.

When World War I broke out, Saeys was appointed coach of Cercle aged just 26. From the start of his career until 1914, Saeys was one of the more important goal scorers for Cercle. After the war, his goal scoring ability never quite matched his earlier success. But he still remained one of the most important players in the green and black eleven. Saeys left football as player after the 1926–27 season, a season in which Cercle captured their second national title. He remained in his coaching position until 1928, and returned for one season in 1941.

Sporting positions
Preceded by (Russian Empire) Vahram Kevorkian	Cercle Brugge top scorer 1906–1907–1908	Succeeded by (Belgium) Michel Nollet
Preceded by (Belgium) Alphonse Six	Cercle Brugge top scorer 1913	Succeeded by (Belgium) Frans Lowyck
