= 1946–47 in Belgian football =

Football in Belgium
- Season: 1946–47

The 1946–47 season was the 44th season of competitive football in Belgium. RSC Anderlechtois won their first Premier Division title. At the end of the season, several teams were relegated at all levels in order to decrease the number of teams in all divisions to 16. The Belgium national football team played 4 friendly games and had only one win, against Scotland.

== Overview ==
At the end of the season, 5 clubs (RCS La Forestoise, R White Star AC, SC Eendracht Aalst, Sint-Niklaas SK and RFC Brugeois) were relegated to Division I, while R Uccle Sport (Division I A winner) and R Charleroi SC (Division I B winner) were promoted to Premier Division.

No fewer than 7 clubs were relegated from Division I to Promotion: Vilvorde FC, CS Schaerbeek, RU Hutoise FC, CS Hallois, RC Lokeren, ASV Oostende KM, Cappellen FC, SC Menen, Oude God Sport, to be replaced by FC Winterslag, Gosselies Sports, RFC Bressoux and SK Roeselare.

== National team ==
Date	Venue	Opponents	Score*	Comp	Belgium scorers
April 7, 1947	Olympic Stadium, Amsterdam (A)	The Netherlands	1-2	F	René Thirifays
May 4, 1947	Bosuilstadion, Antwerp (H)	The Netherlands	1-2	F	Léopold Anoul
May 18, 1947	Heysel Stadium, Brussels (H)	Scotland	2-1	F	Léopold Anoul (2)
June 1, 1947	Stade Olympique de Colombes, Colombes (A)	France	2-4	F	Albert De Cleyn, Henri Coppens

* Belgium score given first

Key

- H = Home match
- A = Away match
- N = On neutral ground
- F = Friendly
- o.g. = own goal

== Honours ==
Competition	Winner
Premier Division	RSC Anderlechtois
Division I	R Uccle Sport and R Charleroi SC
Promotion	FC Winterslag, Gosselies Sports, RFC Bressoux and SK Roeselare

== Final league tables ==
=== Premier Division ===
Top scorer: Jef Mermans (RSC Anderlechtois) with 38 goals.
