= Vahram Kevorkian =

Belgian footballer (1887–1911)

Personal information
- Full name: Vahram Kevorkian
- Date of birth: 17 December 1887
- Place of birth: Erivan, Russian Empire (now Armenia)
- Date of death: 17 July 1911 (aged 23)
- Place of death: Antwerp, Belgium
- Position: Striker

Youth career
- 1902–1903: Cercle Brugge

Senior career*
Years	Team	Apps	(Gls)
1903–1905	Cercle Brugge	11	(7)
1905–1911	Beerschot	98	(92)
Total		109	(99)

International career^{‡}
1908–1911	Belgium	1	(1)
- * Club domestic league appearances and goals as of 20 June 2008 ‡ National team caps and goals as of 20 June 2008

Vahram Kevorkian (17 December 1887– 17 July 1911) was a football player of Armenian descent. His position on the field was striker.

Kevorkian was born in a rich merchant family in Yerevan, and had been sent to study in Boston. He arrived in Belgium presumably in 1902, after he had been studying in the United States. He settled in Bruges and also started playing football for Cercle Brugge in 1902. He made his debut at the highest level of Belgian football one season later.

In 1905, Kevorkian went to Antwerp side Beerschot. Even though Beerschot relegated that season, Kevorkian chose to stay and Antwerp were back again at the top level in 1907.

Kevorkian was called up for Belgium in 1908, for a match against Sweden. Kevorkian scored the 1–0 in the 30th minute. Belgium won the match 2–1. Even though Kevorkian did not have the Belgian nationality, he was allowed to appear in the match. Because when the rule started counting that players had to have the nationality of the country they were playing for, Kevorkian was already playing in Belgium. Such players were still allowed too. (grandfather clause)

He played the last match of his career with Beerschot against his former team Cercle Brugge. The match ended in a 2–2 draw. Shortly afterwards, Kevorkian had to undergo surgery for his appendicitis. However, Kevorkian's situation worsened after the surgery. He died on 17 July 1911.

== Honours ==
=== Individual ===
- Belgian First Division top scorer: 1908-09 (30 goals)

Sporting positions
Preceded by (Belgium) Joseph De Roo	Cercle Brugge top scorer 1905	Succeeded by (Belgium) Louis Saeys
