= Dirk Beheydt =

Belgian footballer

Personal information
- Date of birth: 17 October 1951 (age 75)
- Place of birth: Izegem, Belgium
- Position: Forward

Senior career*
Years	Team	Apps	(Gls)
- Sint-Eloois-Winkel
1975–1984	Cercle Brugge	270	(99)
- RC Harelbeke

International career
1977	Belgium	1	(0)
- * Club domestic league appearances and goals

Dirk Beheydt (born 17 October 1951) is a Belgian former professional footballer who played as a forward.

Beheydt was discovered by Cercle Brugge while he was playing for then lower league side Winkel Sport. Even though there was a big level gap between the two teams, Beheydt had no trouble adjusting to the highest level of Belgian football. He scored on his debut against AS Oostende. This was also the first match for Cercle in their new stadium. Cercle lost the match 2–1.

Beheydt achieved quite some personal highlights with Cercle:

- 3rd most goals in the history of Cercle (only Pertry and Weber do better)
- Top league goal scorer of the team (1976, 1977, 1979, 1980, 1983)
- Player of the Year (1976, 1977)

Dirk Beheydt was also capped once for Belgium. He played in an away game against Italy on 26 January 1977. Belgium lost the match 2-1.
