= Verriest =

Verriest is a surname. Notable people with the surname include:

- Georges Verriest (1909–1985), French footballer
- Julien Verriest (born 1946), Belgian footballer and manager
