= Giovanni Dekeyser =

Belgian footballer

Personal information
- Full name: Giovanni Dekeyser
- Date of birth: 10 December 1976 (age 49)
- Place of birth: Bruges, Belgium
- Position: Midfielder

Youth career
- Cercle Brugge

Senior career*
Years	Team	Apps	(Gls)
1996–2001	Cercle Brugge	152	(19)
2001–2002	Royal Antwerp F.C.	17	(1)
2002–2003	Cercle Brugge	30	(2)
2004–2005	K.M.S.K. Deinze		
2005–2006	K.V. Oostende		
2006	K.S.V. Bornem		
2006–2007	Sint-Eloois-Winkel		
- K.S.K. Maldegem
- K.F.C. Eeklo
- * Club domestic league appearances and goals as of 17 July 2011 ‡ National team caps and goals as of 17 July 2011

Giovanni Dekeyser (born 10 December 1976 in Bruges) is a Belgian football midfielder who currently plays for East Flanders lower league side K.F.C. Eeklo.

He made his senior debut for Cercle Brugge in second division in a 1–1 draw against K.F.C. Lommel S.K., on 17 August 1996. Giovanni Dekeyser became Cercle Brugge top scorer in 2001 and was voted player of the year. This earned him a transfer to Royal Antwerp F.C., who then competed at the highest level of Belgian football. Dekeyser returned to Cercle Brugge after one season where he became second division champions in May 2003.

Other teams of Giovanni Dekeyser include Deinze, Oostende, K.S.V. Bornem, Sint-Eloois-Winkel, Maldegem and Eeklo.

== Notes ==
Sporting positions
Preceded by (Brazil) Fabio Giuntini	Cercle Brugge top scorer 2001	Succeeded by (France) Stéphane Narayaninnaiken
