= Bram van Kerkhof =

Dutch footballer

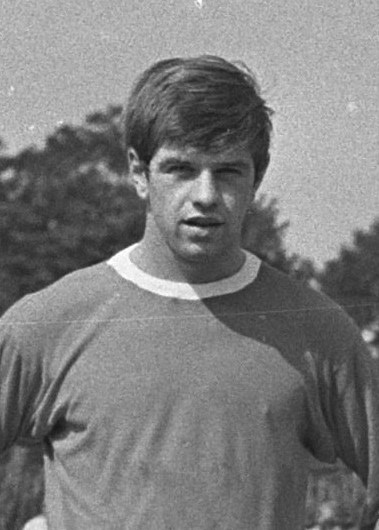

Personal information
- Full name: Marinus van Kerkhof
- Date of birth: 1 November 1948 (age 77)
- Place of birth: Elden, Netherlands
- Position: Midfielder

Senior career*
Years	Team	Apps	(Gls)
1969–1973	Vitesse		
1973–1974	Gent		
1974–1985	Cercle Brugge		
1985–1987	Oostende		

Managerial career
- 1984: Cercle Brugge
- 1990: Oostende
- * Club domestic league appearances and goals

Bram van Kerkhof (born 1 November 1948) is a Dutch football midfielder and later manager.
