= Raf Lapeire =

Belgian footballer

Personal information
- Full name: Raphaël Lapeire
- Date of birth: 30 December 1944
- Place of birth: Izegem, Belgium
- Position: Midfielder

Youth career
- KFC Izegem

Senior career*
| Years | Team | Apps | (Gls) |
- KFC Izegem
| 1970–1975 | Cercle Brugge | 146 | (32) |
| 1975–1980 | SC Menen | | |
| 1980–1981 | Eendracht Wervik | | |
| 1981–1983 | Club Roeselare | | |

International career^{‡}
| | Belgium | 0 | (0) |
- * Club domestic league appearances and goals as of 24 October 2009 ‡ National team caps and goals as of 24 October 2009

Raphaël Lapeire (born 30 December 1944 in Izegem) is a Belgian former football midfielder. He was what would be now considered as a box-to-box player.

Lapeire started playing football at the age of 10, with his local team KFC Izegem. At age 25, he moved to Cercle Brugge, where he would stay five seasons. He made his green and black debut against SK Roeselare, a 3–0 home win with Lapeire scoring twice. In his first season with Cercle, he became second division champions and even top scorer of the team, despite being a midfielder. He would repeat this in the 1972-73 season.

Lapeire left Cercle Brugge after the 1974-75 season, and never returned at the highest level. His last teams were SC Menen, Eendracht Wervik and Club Roeselare.

Sporting positions
| Preceded by (Belgium) Willy Van Acker | Cercle Brugge top scorer 1971 | Succeeded by (Denmark) Benny Nielsen |
| Preceded by (Denmark) Benny Nielsen | Cercle Brugge top scorer 1973 | Succeeded by (Belgium) Franky Vanhaecke |
