= Mohamed Kanu =

Sierra Leonean manager and footballer

Personal information
- Date of birth: 5 July 1968 (age 58)
- Place of birth: Freetown, Sierra Leone
- Position: Central defender

Youth career
- Freetown United

Senior career*
Years	Team	Apps	(Gls)
- Freetown United
1990–1991	Mighty Blackpool		
1991–1996	Eendracht Aalst		
- → Eendracht Hekelgem
1996–1998	KV Oostende		
1998–1999	Beveren		
1999–2004	Cercle Brugge	113	(3)
- Rekkem

International career
1987–1998	Sierra Leone	?	(?)

Managerial career
- FC Knokke (youth coach)
- 2005–2007: Sierra Leone
- * Club domestic league appearances and goals

Mohamed "Ahmed" Kanu (born 5 July 1968 in Freetown) is a Sierra Leonean manager and retired footballer. He used to play as centre back or libero. He managed the national team of Sierra Leone from 2005 to 2007.

== Career ==
He made his international debut for Sierra Leone in 1987 at the age of 19.

Kanu has also had Belgian citizenship since 2002.

During his five-year stay at Cercle Brugge, Kanu was twice voted the best player of the season by the fans, winning the Pop Poll in 2000 and 2003.
