= Marcel Pertry =

Belgian footballer (1921–2008)

Personal information
- Full name: Marcel Pertry
- Date of birth: 19 April 1921
- Place of birth: Vlamertinge, Belgium
- Date of death: 10 April 2008 (aged 86)
- Place of death: Bruges, Belgium
- Position: Forward

Youth career
- SK Vlamertinge

Senior career*
Years	Team	Apps	(Gls)
- SK Vlamertinge
1943–1955	Cercle Brugge	277	(137)
- Cercle Ieper

International career^{‡}
	Belgium	0	(0)

Managerial career
- Cercle Brugge (youth coach)
- Club Brugge (assistant manager)
- SK Roeselare
- FC Torhout
- * Club domestic league appearances and goals as of 2008-02-04 ‡ National team caps and goals as of 2008-02-04

Marcel Pertry (19 April 1921 in Vlamertinge – 10 April 2008 in Bruges) is a Belgian former football player. Pertry is especially remembered for his goalscoring abilities. Pertry is also Cercle Brugge's all-time top scorer.

Pertry was transferred from his local team SK Vlamertinge to Cercle Brugge in 1943. He made his debut in a 2–2 home draw against Lyra, scoring once. Pertry would especially remember his début because when he was waiting in Ypres for his train to Bruges, some members of the Flemish National Union's Black Brigade passed by. One stepped out of his group, went towards Pertry and hit him in the face, telling that the mockery with the Black Brigade should stop once and for all. Pertry didn't know what he had done wrong. Probably, he just had a big smile on his face while looking forward towards his first match at the highest level of Belgian football.

Pertry ended his career as football player with Cercle Ieper, but would return to Cercle Brugge as youth coach. Before the 1966–67 season, Cercle Brugge were looking for a new head coach. Marcel Pertry (assistant manager at that time) and Urbain Braems were the biggest candidates for the vacant position. Both had to give to the Cercle board their vision about football and how they would implement it in the training sessions. But due to the Cercle board not reaching a consensus, Frenchman Jules Van Dooren was finally chosen.

Sporting positions
Preceded by (Belgium) Albert De Kimpe	Cercle Brugge top scorer 1944–1946–1947	Succeeded by (Belgium) Edmond Verté
Preceded by (Belgium) Edmond Verté	Cercle Brugge top scorer 1949–1950–1951	Succeeded by (Belgium) Georges Debbaut
