= Christophe Lauwers =

Belgian footballer (born 1972)

Christophe Lauwers (born 17 September 1972) is a Belgian former professional footballer who played as a striker. He collected two caps for the Belgium national team.

== Career ==
- 1990–1997: Cercle Brugge
- 1997–1999: Eendracht Aalst
- 1999: Toulouse
- 1999–2002: SV Ried
- 2002–2003: Visé
- 2003–2004: K.V. Oostende
- 2004–2006: Roeselare
- 2006–2007: K.V. Oostende

== Later life ==
In 2007, after his retirement from playing professional football, Lauwers worked as a bus driver in Bruges.
