= 1913–14 Belgian First Division =

19th season of top-tier football in Belgium

Belgian First Division
- Season: 1913–14

Statistics of Belgian First Division in the 1913–14 season.

== Overview ==
Location of teams in Belgian First Division 1913–14

It was contested by 12 teams, and Daring Club won the championship.

Because they finished level on points in 10th/11th place, A.A. La Gantoise and Standard Club Liégeois played a Test Match to decide who would stay up: this was won by La Gantoise, thus relegating Liégeois to the Promotion Division.

== League standings ==
Pos	Team	Pld	W	D	L	GF	GA	GD	Pts	Relegation
1	Daring Club	22	16	4	2	69	16	+53	36	
2	Union Saint-Gilloise	22	15	3	4	60	28	+32	33	
3	C.S. Brugeois	22	13	4	5	48	27	+21	30	
4	F.C. Brugeois	22	13	1	8	42	31	+11	27	
5	Racing Club de Bruxelles	22	11	3	8	46	32	+14	25	
6	C.S. Verviétois	22	9	3	10	38	39	−1	21	
7	Beerschot	22	8	3	11	34	42	−8	19	
8	R.C. Gantois	22	8	3	11	31	44	−13	19	
9	Antwerp F.C.	22	7	3	12	37	54	−17	17	
10	A.A. La Gantoise	23	6	3	14	29	53	−24	15	
11	Standard Club Liégeois	23	6	1	16	29	53	−24	13	Relegated to Promotion Division
12	Léopold Club de Bruxelles	22	4	1	17	31	63	−32	9	Relegated to Promotion Division

== Results ==
Home \ Away	ANT	BEE	CSB	FCB	DAR	LÉO	RCB	USG	GNT	GAN	STA	VER
Antwerp		2–4	2–3	1–3	1–0	0–3	1–2	3–2	5–2	1–4	2–1	1–3
Beerschot	1–3		0–0	2–1	1–2	3–2	2–1	1–3	4–1	2–0	6–1	1–1
CS Brugeois	2–2	3–2		1–2	0–0	5–0	1–3	2–1	1–1	2–0	5–0	3–1
FC Brugeois	1–0	5–1	1–0		1–1	1–0	5–1	0–2	3–0	3–0	2–0	4–0
Daring Club	8–0	4–0	9–0	7–1		7–1	3–2	5–0	3–1	2–0	0–0	2–0
Léopold	2–3	4–1	1–6	5–0	0–4		1–7	0–1	1–2	1–1	4–0	3–4
Racing Bruxelles	0–0	1–1	1–3	2–1	3–4	2–0		1–2	4–0	3–2	6–0	3–0
Union SG	2–2	1–0	0–4	2–1	1–0	7–0	2–2		6–1	12–0	5–1	4–2
La Gantoise	4–3	3–0	0–5	0–3	1–1	4–0	0–2	1–2		0–0	2–3	2–1
Racing Gand	5–0	0–1	1–0	3–1	2–3	4–3	0–2	0–1	1–0		2–1	2–0
Standard Liège	0–4	1–0	0–1	0–2	0–2	2–1	1–3	2–4	2–0	4–2		0–1
Verviétois	2–1	3–1	0–1	3–1	1–2	6–0	4–2	0–0	3–2	2–2	1–2	

Legend: Blue = home team win; Yellow = draw; Red = away team win.

== See also ==
- 1913–14 in Belgian football
