= Robert Braet =

Belgian footballer

Personal information
- Full name: Robert Braet
- Date of birth: 11 February 1912
- Place of birth: Bruges, Belgium
- Date of death: 23 February 1987 (aged 75)
- Place of death: Bruges, Belgium
- Position: Goalkeeper

Youth career
- Cercle Brugge

Senior career*
Years	Team	Apps	(Gls)
1928–1948	Cercle Brugge	350	(0)

International career^{‡}
1931–1938	Belgium	14	(0)
- * Club domestic league appearances and goals as of 2 July 2007 ‡ National team caps and goals as of 2 July 2007

Robert Braet (11 February 1912, in Bruges – 23 February 1987, in Bruges) was a tall Belgian goalkeeper. He never played for any other football team besides Cercle Brugge. Braet is seen as one of the biggest monuments in the team's history. He was on the Belgium national team that took part in the 1938 FIFA World Cup.

== Club career ==
Braet made his debut for Cercle when he had just turned 18, in a 0–1 away win against Lierse. He would quite immediately achieve his place in the starting eleven. In 1948, when Braet finished his career as goalkeeper, he had made 352 appearances for Cercle. Only 5 players do better. Braet was also chairman of Cercle Brugge from 1967 until 1970. There are 3 other former Cercle chairmen who have ever played for the green and black side: the others are Raoul Daufresne de la Chevalerie (35 appearances and 5 goals), Léon De Meester and Edgard De Smedt (both 1 appearance and 0 goals).

== International career ==
Braet made his debut for Belgium in an October 1931 friendly match against Poland and earned a total of 14 caps, scoring no goals. His final international was a February 1938 friendly against the Netherlands.

== Legacy ==
Braet has named a trophy after him, which is awarded every 2-year to the person who has made himself voluntarily most useful for the team.
