= 2002–03 in Belgian football =

Football in Belgium
- Season: 2002–03

The 2002–03 season was the 100th competitive season in Belgian football.

== National team ==
Belgium began their qualifying campaign for the 2004 UEFA European Championship.

Date	Venue	Opponents	Score*	Comp	Belgium scorers	Match Report
21 August 2002	Szczecin (A)	Poland	1–1	F	Wesley Sonck
7 September 2002	King Baudouin Stadium, Brussels (H)	Bulgaria	0–2	ECQ
12 October 2002	Estadi Communal, Andorra La Vella (A)	Andorra	1–0	ECQ	Wesley Sonck
16 October 2002	A.Le Coq Arena, Tallinn (A)	Estonia	1–0	ECQ	Wesley Sonck
12 February 2003	Annaba (A)	Algeria	3–1	F	Emile Mpenza (2), Wesley Sonck
29 March 2003	Maksimir stadium, Zagreb (A)	Croatia	0–4	ECQ
30 April 2003	King Baudouin Stadium, Brussels (H)	Poland	3–1	F	Wesley Sonck, Thomas Buffel, Tom Soetaers
7 June 2003	Vasil Levski National Stadium, Sofia (A)	Bulgaria	2–2	ECQ	Stilian Petrov (og), Philippe Clement
11 June 2003	Jules Ottenstadion, Ghent (H)	Andorra	3–0	ECQ	Bart Goor (2), Wesley Sonck	www.sport.be

* Belgium score given first

Key

- H = Home match
- A = Away match
- F = Friendly
- ECQ = UEFA European Championship 2004 Qualifying, Group 8
- og = own goal

== Honours ==
Competition	Winner
Jupiler League	Club Brugge
Cup	Louviéroise
Supercup	Club Brugge
Second division	Cercle Brugge
Third division A	Berchem Sport
Third division B	Tubize

== See also ==
- Belgian First Division 2002-03
- 2002 Belgian Super Cup
- Belgian Second Division
- Belgian Third Division: divisions A and B
- Belgian Promotion: divisions A, B, C and D
