= Han Grijzenhout =

Dutch footballer and manager (1932–2020)

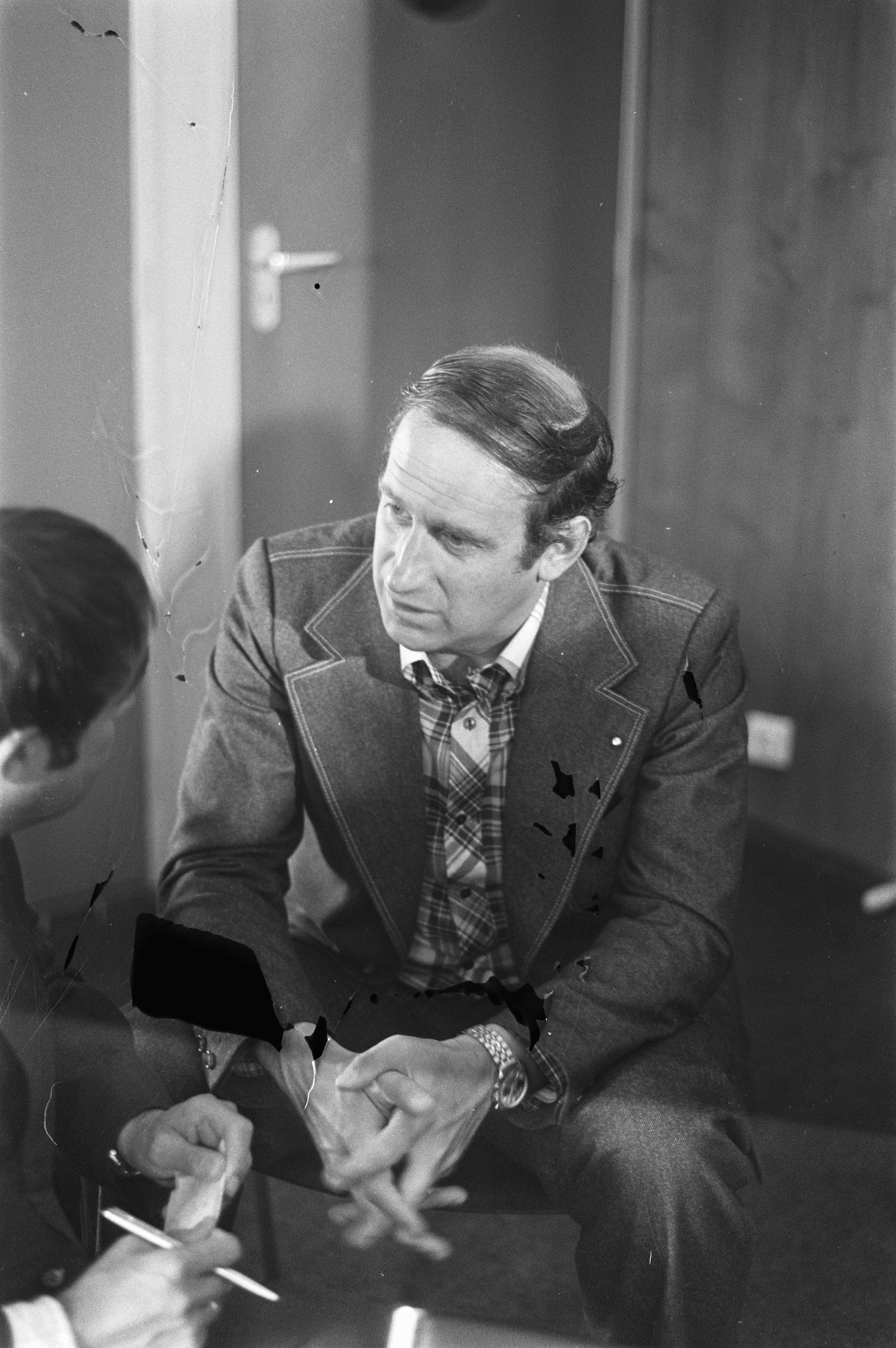

Personal information
- Full name: Johan Grijzenhout
- Date of birth: 22 December 1932
- Place of birth: Amsterdam, Netherlands
- Date of death: 18 December 2020 (aged 87)
- Place of death: Ghent, Belgium
- Position: Defender

Senior career*
Years	Team	Apps	(Gls)
–1959	DWS		

Managerial career
- 1965–1972: Ajax (assistant)
- 1972–1977: Cercle Brugge
- 1977–1978: Lokeren
- 1978–1979: Cercle Brugge
- 1979–1980: Club Brugge
- 1980–1981: AA Gent
- 1981–1982: Oostende
- 1982–1983: Cercle Brugge
- 1983–1984: Waterschei
- 1984–1987: AA Gent
- 1987: Kortrijk
- 1988–1991: Cercle Brugge
- 1991–1992: Eendracht Aalst
- * Club domestic league appearances and goals

Han Grijzenhout (22 December 1932 – 18 December 2020) was a Dutch football manager.

He played 7 games for DWS in the 1956–57 Eerste Divisie season.

After retiring as a player, Grijzenhout coached the reserve team and was assistant to managers Rinus Michels and Ștefan Kovács at Ajax, before embarking on a lenghty career as a club manager in Belgium. He managed Cercle Brugge for 10 years.

He died on 18 December 2020, aged 87.
