= 1969–70 in Belgian football =

Football in Belgium
- Season: 1969–70

The 1969–70 season was the 67th season of competitive football in Belgium. Standard Club Liégeois won their 5th Division I title. RSC Anderlechtois reached the final of the Inter-Cities Fairs Cup and Standard Club Liégeois reached the quarter-finals of the European Champion Clubs' Cup. This was the first time a Belgian club reached the final of a European club competition. RFC Brugeois won the Belgian Cup final against Division II club R Daring Club Molenbeek (6-1). The Belgium national football team finished their 1970 FIFA World Cup qualification campaign and qualified for the 1970 FIFA World Cup finals in Mexico. They won 1 game out of 3 in the first round and finished 3rd of their group.

== Overview ==
Belgium was already qualified for the World Cup finals, and lost their last qualifying game 4-0 in Yugoslavia. For the finals, Belgium was drawn in Group 1 with host Mexico as well as Soviet Union and El Salvador. They won the first game 3-0 against El Salvador but then lost to Soviet Union and Mexico and so finished 3rd of their group. Mexico and Soviet Union qualified for the quarter-finals.

At the end of the season, K Beringen FC and ASV Oostende KM were relegated to Division II and were replaced by KFC Diest and R Antwerp FC from Division II.
The bottom 2 clubs in Division II (VV Patro Eisden and RRC Tournaisien) were relegated to Division III and were replaced by RAA Louviéroise and AS Eupen from Division III.
The bottom club of each Division III league (RA Marchiennoise des Sports, KVC Zwevegem Sport, RRFC Montegnée and ACV Brasschaat) were relegated to Promotion and were replaced by R Léopold Club Bastogne, FC Dessel Sport, SV Oudenaarde and KSK Tongeren from Promotion.

== National team ==
Date	Venue	Opponents	Score*	Comp	Belgium scorers
19 October 1969	Skopje City Stadium, Skopje (A)	Yugoslavia	0-4	WCQ
5 November 1969	Estadio Azteca, Mexico City (A)	Mexico	0-1	F
25 February 1970	Stade Emile Versé, Brussels (H)	England	1-3	F	Jean Dockx
3 June 1970	Estadio Azteca, Mexico City (N)	El Salvador	3-0	WCFR	Wilfried Van Moer (2), Raoul Lambert
6 June 1970	Estadio Azteca, Mexico City (N)	Soviet Union	1-4	WCFR	Raoul Lambert
11 June 1970	Estadio Azteca, Mexico City (N)	Mexico	0-1	WCFR

* Belgium score given first

Key

- H = Home match
- A = Away match
- N = On neutral ground
- F = Friendly
- WCQ = World Cup qualification
- WCFR = World Cup first round
- o.g. = own goal

== European competitions ==
Standard Club Liégeois beat 17 Nëntori Tirana of Albania in the first round of the 1969–70 European Champion Clubs' Cup (won 3-0 at home, drew 1-1 away) and Real Madrid CF of Spain in the second round (won 1-0 at home, 3-2 away). In the quarter-finals, Standard Club Liégeois lost to Leeds United (lost both legs 0-1) as they did the previous season in the first round of the 1968–69 Inter-Cities Fairs Cup.

K Lierse SK eliminated APOEL FC of Cyprus in the first round of the 1969–70 European Cup Winners' Cup (won 10-1 at home, 1-0 away) but lost in the second round to Manchester City FC (lost 0-3 at home, 0-5 away).

The 3 Belgian clubs who entered the 1969–70 Inter-Cities Fairs Cup were qualified for the first time as the highest-placed teams in the last championship who did not qualify for the other 2 European competitions.
In the first round, R Charleroi SC defeated NK Zagreb of Yugoslavia (won 2-1 at home, 3-1 away), RSC Anderlechtois defeated Valur of Iceland (won 6-0 away, 2-0 at home) and RFC Brugeois defeated CE Sabadell FC of Spain (lost 0-2 away, won 5-1 at home).
In the second round, RSC Anderlechtois beat Coleraine FC of Northern Ireland (won 6-1 at home, 7-3 away), but R Charleroi SC lost to FC Rouen of France on away goals (won 3-1 at home, lost 0-2 away) and RFC Brugeois lost to Ujpest FC of Hungary, also on away goals (won 5-2 at home, lost 0-3 away).
In the third round, RSC Anderlechtois beat Dunfermline Athletic FC of Scotland on away goals (won 1-0 at home, lost 2-3 away) and in the quarter-finals Newcastle United FC, again on away goals (won 2-0 at home, lost 1-3 away). RSC Anderlechtois became the 3rd Belgian club to reach the semifinals of the Inter-Cities Fairs Cup after RU Saint-Gilloise and RFC Liégeois, and became the first Belgian club to reach a European competition final after they beat FC Internazionale (lost 0-1 at home, won 2-0 away).
In the 1970 Inter-Cities Fairs Cup Final, RSC Anderlechtois captained by Paul Van Himst lost to Arsenal FC (won 3-1 at home, lost 0-3 away).

== Honours ==
Competition	Winner
Division I	Standard Club Liégeois
Cup	RFC Brugeois
Division II	KFC Diest
Division III	RAA Louviéroise and AS Eupen
Promotion	R Léopold Club Bastogne, FC Dessel Sport, SV Oudenaarde and KSK Tongeren

== Final league tables ==
=== Premier Division ===
- 1969-70 Top scorer: West German Lothar Emmerich (K Beerschot VAV) with 29 goals
- 1969 Golden Shoe: Wilfried Van Moer (Standard Club Liégeois)
