= Florimond Vanhalme =

Belgian footballer and coach

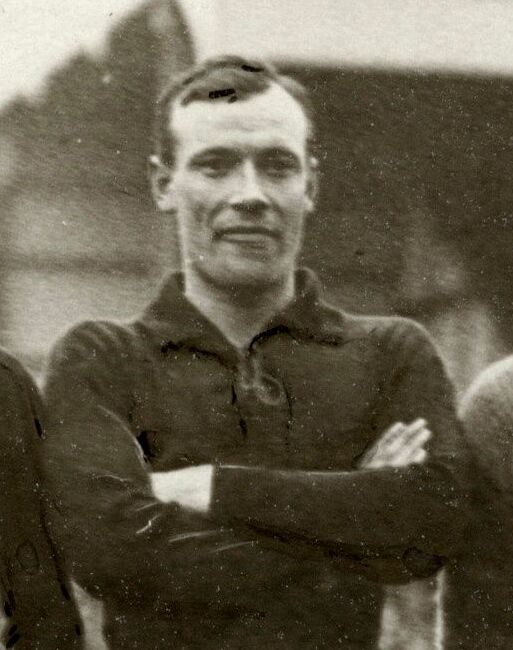

Personal information
- Full name: Florimond Vanhalme
- Date of birth: 21 March 1895
- Place of birth: Sint-Andries (Bruges), Belgium
- Date of death: 4 July 1979 (aged 84)
- Place of death: Ostend, Belgium
- Position: Midfielder

Youth career
- Cercle Brugge

Senior career*
Years	Team	Apps	(Gls)
1911–1931	Cercle Brugge	320	(33)

International career^{‡}
1927–1931	Belgium	39	(2)

Managerial career
- Cercle Brugge
- VC Vlissingen
- Kortrijk Sport
- FC Knokke
- * Club domestic league appearances and goals as of 14 January 2008 ‡ National team caps and goals as of 14 January 2008

Florimond Vanhalme (21 March 1895 – 4 July 1979) was a Belgium football midfielder, who still is record Belgian international for Cercle Brugge, the team where he spent all of his career. After his playing career, Vanhalme stayed in football as coach.

Vanhalme debuted at the highest level on 5 May 1912, in a match against Excelsior Brussel. The match was won 1–4, with Vanhalme scoring once. One season later, Vanhalme was part of the squad that played the cup final against Union SG. After 90 minutes, the score was 2–2, and with no rules about what should be done, officials of the KBVB/URBSFA decided on the spot that extra time had to be played. This would be the first time in Belgian football history that a match would be decided this way. Union SG eventually won the match with 3–2.

Vanhalme was twice champion of Belgium with Cercle Brugge, in 1927 and in 1930. He also was called up for Belgium at the 1924 and 1928 Summer Olympics. He did not come into action in 1924. In 1928, he played the matches against Luxembourg and Argentina.

== Sources ==
- Roland Podevijn, Cercle Brugge 1899-1989, K.S.V. Cercle Brugge, 1989
