= 1919–20 in Belgian football =

Football in Belgium
- Season: 1919–20

The 1919–20 season was the 20th season of competitive football in Belgium. It was the first season of Belgian football since 1913–14, as a result of World War I.

== Overview ==
FC Brugeois (now Club Brugge) won the Division I title for the first time. Tilleur FC won the second division, called the Promotion division. However, that season, no relegation or promotion occurred.

== National team ==
Date	Venue	Opponents	Score*	Comp	Belgium scorers	Match Report
March 9, 1919	Stade du Vivier d'Oie, Brussels (H)	France	2-2	F	Georges Michel, Gamblin (o.g.)	FA website
February 17, 1920	Vélodrome de Longchamps, Brussels (H)	England amateur	3-1	F	Robert Coppée (2), Louis Van Hege	FA website
March 28, 1920	Parc des Princes, Paris (A)	France	1-2	F	Honoré Vlaminck	FA website

* Belgium score given first

Key

- H = Home match
- A = Away match
- N = On neutral ground
- F = Friendly
- o.g. = own goal

== Honours ==
Competition	Winner
Division I	FC Brugeois
Promotion	Tilleur FC

== Final league tables ==
=== Promotion ===
Pos	Team	Pld	Won	Drw	Lst	GF	GA	Pts	GD	Notes
1	Tilleur FC	22	15	4	3	61	24	34	+37	
2	Standard Club Liégeois	22	12	4	6	54	28	28	+26	
3	SC Anderlechtois	22	10	6	6	42	26	26	+16	
4	TSV Lyra	22	10	6	6	33	21	26	+12	
5	FC Liégeois	22	9	7	6	33	33	25	0	
6	Berchem Sport	22	10	4	8	32	29	24	+3	
7	FC Malinois	22	9	5	8	31	35	23	-4	
8	FC de Bressoux	22	9	3	10	39	38	21	+1	
9	Stade Louvaniste	22	6	6	10	26	32	18	-6	
10	SC Courtraisien	22	8	2	12	45	64	18	-19	
11	Léopold Club de Bruxelles	22	7	3	12	49	61	17	-12	
12	AEC Mons	22	0	4	18	19	73	4	-54	
