= Honoré Vlamynck =

Belgian footballer

Personal information
- Date of birth: 29 January 1897
- Place of birth: Ostend, Belgium
- Date of death: 1 September 1974 (aged 77)
- Position: Forward

Senior career*
Years	Team	Apps	(Gls)
–1914	Oostende		
1915	→ Leicester Imperial (guest)		
1918–1919	→ Leicester Fosse (guest)	4	(3)
1919–1932	Daring Club Molenbeek	129	(86)

International career
1919–1923	Belgium	4	(3)
- * Club domestic league appearances and goals

Honoré Vlamynck (29 January 1897 – 1 September 1974) was a Belgian professional footballer, best remembered for his 13 year career as a forward in the Belgian First Division with R. Daring Club Molenbeek. He scored three goals in four appearances for Belgium at international level. Vlamynck guested for English club Leicester Fosse during the First World War.

== Personal life ==
Vlamynck served in the Belgian Army during the early months of the First World War and was wounded during the Battle of the Frontiers. He convalesced from his injuries in Leicester, England.

== Honours ==
R. Daring Club Molenbeek

- Belgian First Division: 1920–21

Individual

- Belgian First Division top scorer: 1919–20
