= Yves Feys =

Belgian footballer

Personal information
- Full name: Yves Feys
- Date of birth: 16 January 1969 (age 57)
- Place of birth: Torhout, Belgium
- Height: 1.83 m (6 ft 0 in)
- Position: Goalkeeper

Youth career
- 1978–1988: Cercle Brugge

Senior career*
Years	Team	Apps	(Gls)
1988–1997	Cercle Brugge	206	(0)
1997–2000	Exc. Mouscron	0	(0)
2000–2001	Cercle Brugge	2	(0)
2001–2005	FC Antwerp	116	(0)
2005–2006	Deinze		
- * Club domestic league appearances and goals as of 7 June 2008 ‡ National team caps and goals as of 7 June 2008

Yves Feys (born 16 January 1969 in Torhout) is a retired Belgian professional football goalkeeper. He has played most of his career for Cercle Brugge.

== Club career ==
Feys started playing football at age 9 with top level team Cercle Brugge. He stayed with the green and black side until they relegated to the second division. He went to Excelsior Mouscron. In the last season with the Hainaut side, Feys wasn't given much play time. As a result, Feys returned to his roots. Feys became back-up goalie for Björn Sengier.

After this quite disappointing season for Feys, he decided to try his luck with Jupiler League side FC Antwerp. Feys ended his career with Deinze.

Yves Feys won the Cercle Brugge Pop Poll three consecutive times.

== Retirement ==
During and after his career, Feys was active in the building industry.
