= 1968–69 in Belgian football =

Football in Belgium
- Season: 1968–69

The 1968–69 season was the 66th season of competitive football in Belgium. Standard Club Liégeois won their 4th Division I title. No Belgian club managed to pass the second round of the European competitions, though for the first time 6 Belgian clubs qualified (1 more club qualified for the Inter-Cities Fairs Cup). K Lierse SK won the Belgian Cup final against RR White (2-0). The Belgium national football team continued their 1970 FIFA World Cup qualification campaign with 3 home wins against all other Group 6 teams (Finland, Yugoslavia and Spain) and a draw in Spain. Belgium qualified for the 1970 FIFA World Cup finals in Mexico with one match to go. For the first time since the 1954 FIFA World Cup, Belgium would qualify for a major tournament.

== Overview ==
At the end of the season, RFC Malinois and R Daring Club Molenbeek were relegated to Division II and were replaced by ASV Oostende KM and R Crossing Club Molenbeek from Division II.
The bottom 2 clubs in Division II (KFC Herentals and RFC Sérésien) were relegated to Division III, to be replaced by KRC Mechelen and KSV Sottegem from Division III.
The bottom club of each Division III league (K Wezel Sport FC after a play-off game against ACV Brasschaat, K Olympia SC Wijgmaal, R Entente Sportive Jamboise and RRC de Gand) were relegated to Promotion, to be replaced by Kortrijk Sport, VC Westerlo, RAA Louviéroise and AS Eupen from Promotion.

== National team ==
Date	Venue	Opponents	Score*	Comp	Belgium scorers
October 9, 1968	Regenboogstadion, Waregem (H)	Finland	6-1	WCQ	Wilfried Puis (2), Odilon Polleunis (3), Léon Semmeling
October 16, 1968	Stade Emile Versé, Brussels (H)	Yugoslavia	3-0	WCQ	Johan Devrindt (2), Odilon Polleunis
December 11, 1968	Santiago Bernabéu Stadium, Madrid (A)	Spain	1-1	WCQ	Johan Devrindt
February 23, 1969	Stade de Sclessin, Liège (H)	Spain	2-1	WCQ	Johan Devrindt (2)
April 16, 1969	Heysel Stadium, Brussels (H)	Mexico	2-0	F	Wilfried Puis, Paul Van Himst

* Belgium score given first

Key

- H = Home match
- A = Away match
- N = On neutral ground
- F = Friendly
- WCQ = World Cup qualification
- o.g. = own goal

== European competitions ==
RSC Anderlechtois beat Glentoran of Northern Ireland in the first round of the 1968–69 European Champion Clubs' Cup (won 3–0 at home, drew 1–1 away) but were eliminated in the second round by Manchester United (lost 0–3 away, won 3–1 at home).

RFC Brugeois lost in the first round of the 1968–69 European Cup Winners' Cup to West Bromwich Albion on away goals (won 3–1 at home, lost 0–2 away).

For the first time, 4 Belgian clubs entered the 1968–69 Inter-Cities Fairs Cup: KSV Waregem beat Atlético Madrid of Spain on away goals (lost 1–2 away, won 1–0 at home), Standard Club Liégeois was defeated by Leeds United (drew 0-0 at home, lost 2-3 away), K Beerschot VAV by DWS of the Netherlands (drew 1–1 at home, lost 1–2 away) and R Daring Club Molenbeek by Panathinaikos of Greece (won 2–1 at home, lost 0–2 away).
In the second round, KSV Waregem lost to Legia Warszawa of Poland (won 1-0 at home, lost 0-2 away).

== Honours ==
Competition	Winner
Division I	Standard Club Liégeois
Cup	K Lierse SK
Division II	ASV Oostende KM
Division III	KRC Mechelen and KSV Sottegem
Promotion	Kortrijk Sport, VC Westerlo, RAA Louviéroise and AS Eupen

== Final league tables ==
=== Premier Division ===
- 1968-69 Top scorer: Hungarian Antal Nagy (Standard Club Liégeois) with 20 goals
- 1968 Golden Shoe: Odilon Polleunis (K Sint-Truidense VV)
