= 1966–67 in Belgian football =

Football in Belgium
- Season: 1966–67

The 1966–67 season was the 64th season of competitive football in Belgium. RSC Anderlechtois won their 13th and 4th consecutive Division I title. They also entered the 1966–67 European Champion Clubs' Cup as Belgian title holder. Standard Liège entered the 1966–67 European Cup Winners' Cup as the Cup holder and reacher the semifinals. RFC Liégeois, ARA La Gantoise and R Antwerp FC all played the 1966–67 Inter-Cities Fairs Cup. Standard Liège won the Belgian Cup final against RFC Malinois (3-1 after extra time). The Belgium national football team started their 1968 UEFA Euro qualification campaign with 2 wins (against neighbours France and Luxembourg) and 1 loss (against Poland).

== Overview ==
Belgium was drawn in Group 7 of the 1968 UEFA Euro qualification first round with France, Poland and Luxembourg. All 8 group winners would later play quarter-finals in two legs before the finals. Belgium started their campaign with a 2-1 win against France, then with a 0-5 win against Luxembourg. In the late season, Poland beat Belgium 3-1. At this point, Poland, France and Belgium were level with 4 points.

At the end of the season, ARA La Gantoise and R Tilleur FC were relegated to the Division II and were replaced in Division I by Division II winner SK Beveren-Waas and runner-up OC Charleroi. The bottom 2 clubs in Division II (UR Namur and K Willebroekse SV) were relegated to Division III while both Division III winners (RRC Tournaisien and RC Tirlemont) qualified for the Division II. The bottom 2 clubs of each Division III league were relegated to the Promotion: Kortrijk Sport, U Basse-Sambre-Auvelais, Wavre Sports and Voorwaarts Tienen. The winner of each Promotion league was promoted to the Division III: K Puurs EFC, SV Oudenaarde, K Olympia SC Wijgmaal and RA Marchiennoise des Sports.

== National team ==
Date	Venue	Opponents	Score*	Comp	Belgium scorers
October 22, 1966	Klokke Stadion, Bruges (H)	Switzerland	1-0	F	Roger Claessen
November 11, 1966	Heysel Stadium, Brussels (H)	France	2-1	ECQ	Paul Van Himst (2)
March 19, 1967	Stade Municipal, Luxembourg (A)	Luxembourg	5-0	ECQ	Paul Van Himst (2), Jacques Stockman (3)
April 16, 1967	Bosuilstadion, Antwerp (H)	Netherlands	1-0	F	Wilfried Puis
May 21, 1967	Silesian Stadium, Chorzów (A)	Poland	1-3	ECQ	Wilfried Puis

* Belgium score given first

Key

- H = Home match
- A = Away match
- N = On neutral ground
- F = Friendly
- ECQ = European Championship qualification
- o.g. = own goal

== European competitions ==
RSC Anderlechtois easily beat FC Haka of Finland in the first round of the 1966–67 European Champion Clubs' Cup (wins 1-10 away and 2-0 at home) but was eliminated in the second round by Dukla Prague of Czechoslovakia (defeats 4-1 away and 1-2 at home).

Standard Liège defeated Valur of Iceland in the preliminary round of the 1966–67 European Cup Winners' Cup (draw 1-1 away and win 8-1 at home). In the first round proper, Standard eliminated Apollon Limassol FC of Cyprus (wins 5-1 at home and 0-1 away) and in the second round BSG Chemie Leipzig of East Germany on away goals (defeat 2-1 away and win 1-0 at home). In the quarter-finals, the Belgians defeated the Hungarians of Raba ETO Győr (defeat 2-1 away and win 2-0 at home). In the semifinals, they were defeated by Bayern Munich of West Germany (defeats 2-0 away and 1-3 at home).

Three Belgian clubs entered the 1966–67 Inter-Cities Fairs Cup, with R Antwerp FC eliminating US Luxembourg in the first round (two 1-0 wins) and RFC Liégeois and ARA La Gantoise being directly qualified for the second round. In the second round, RFC Liégeois lost to 1. FC Lokomotive Leipzig of East Germany (draw 0-0 away and defeat 1-2 at home), R Antwerp FC lost to Kilmarnock FC of Scotland (defeats 0-1 at home and 7-2 away) and ARA La Gantoise won against FC Girondins de Bordeaux of France (win 1-0 at home and draw 0-0 away). ARA La Gantoise then lost in the third round to Kilmarnock FC (defeats 1-0 away and 1-2 at home after extra time).

== Honours ==
Competition	Winner
Division I	RSC Anderlechtois
Cup	Standard Liège
Division II	SK Beveren-Waas
Division III	RRC Tournaisien and RC Tirlemont
Promotion	K Puurs EFC, SV Oudenaarde, K Olympia SC Wijgmaal and RA Marchiennoise des Sports

== Final league tables ==
=== Premier Division ===
- 1966-67 Top scorer: Dutchman Jan Mulder (RSC Anderlechtois) with 20 goals
- 1966 Golden Shoe: Wilfried Van Moer (R Antwerp FC)
