= 1920–21 Belgian First Division =

21st season of top-tier football in Belgium

Belgian First Division
- Season: 1920–21

Statistics of Belgian First Division in the 1920–21 season.

== Overview ==
Location of teams in Belgian First Division 1920–21

It was contested by 12 teams, and Daring Club won the championship.
As the number of clubs was to be increased from 12 to 14, only one club was relegated to the Promotion Division, with three clubs promoted.

== League standings ==
Pos	Team	Pld	W	D	L	GF	GA	GD	Pts	Relegation
1	Daring Club	22	15	5	2	40	10	+30	35	
2	Royale Union Saint-Gilloise	22	12	7	3	46	18	+28	31	
3	Beerschot	22	13	1	8	51	28	+23	27	
4	FC Bruges	22	11	4	7	47	29	+18	26	
5	Cercle Bruges	22	11	4	7	41	32	+9	26	
6	R.R.C. Bruxelles	22	8	6	8	43	40	+3	22	
7	La Gantoise	22	8	6	8	28	33	−5	22	
8	RC de Gand	22	7	7	8	30	45	−15	21	
9	Royal Antwerp FC	22	6	8	8	29	37	−8	20	
10	KRC Malines	22	4	7	11	22	42	−20	15	
11	RCS Verviers	22	4	4	14	34	51	−17	12	
12	R. Uccle Sport	22	2	3	17	17	63	−46	7	Relegated to Promotion Division

== Results ==
Home \ Away	ANT	BEE	CER	CLU	DAR	RCB	USG	GNT	GAN	RCM	UCC	VER
Antwerp		0–6	1–2	3–3	2–1	2–1	1–1	1–2	1–2	2–2	3–0	1–0
Beerschot	4–1		1–2	3–1	0–1	4–1	3–0	4–0	2–3	2–1	2–0	3–1
Cercle Brugge	1–1	3–2		0–2	1–0	2–3	0–2	4–3	6–1	1–1	4–1	6–2
Club Brugge	3–2	1–0	2–0		2–3	2–2	2–0	1–2	6–1	2–0	2–0	6–0
Daring Club	4–0	2–0	1–1	1–0		1–0	1–1	1–1	3–0	3–0	3–0	2–1
Racing Bruxelles	3–2	3–0	1–0	0–0	1–4		0–5	5–0	7–2	3–1	1–1	2–4
Union SG	0–0	2–1	4–0	1–1	0–0	1–0		2–0	5–3	7–0	5–0	2–0
La Gantoise	0–0	0–2	0–2	4–0	0–5	2–0	0–0		1–1	1–1	5–0	2–0
Racing Gand	0–0	1–3	0–0	3–0	0–1	1–1	2–1	2–1		2–1	0–0	1–0
K.R.C. Mechelen	1–1	1–2	0–1	2–1	0–2	2–2	1–3	0–0	1–1		2–0	2–0
Uccle	0–2	2–5	3–2	0–7	0–1	2–2	1–2	1–2	4–3	0–2		2–4
Verviétois	1–3	2–2	1–3	2–3	0–0	2–5	2–2	1–2	1–1	6–1	4–0	

Legend: Blue = home team win; Yellow = draw; Red = away team win.
