= Edmond Verbruggen =

Belgian footballer

Personal information
- Date of birth: 15 March 1882
- Date of death: 9 April 1949 (aged 67)

International career
Years	Team	Apps	(Gls)
1910	Belgium	1	(0)

Edmond Verbruggen (15 March 1882 – 9 April 1949) was a Belgian footballer. He played in one match for the Belgium national football team in 1910.
