= Henri Bierna =

Belgian footballer

Personal information
- Date of birth: 2 September 1905
- Place of birth: Liège, Belgium
- Date of death: 28 August 1944 (aged 38)
- Place of death: Waremme, Belgium
- Position: Forward

Senior career*
| Years | Team | Apps | (Gls) |
| 1926–1939 | US Liège | | |

International career
| 1927–1928 | Belgium | 9 | (2) |
- * Club domestic league appearances and goals

Henri Bierna (2 September 1905 – 28 August 1944) was a Belgian footballer. A forward, he played in nine matches for the Belgium national team in 1927 and 1928 and was part of the squad at the 1928 Summer Olympics. He was killed during an American bombing raid in 1944 during the Second World War.
