= Freddy Chaves =

Belgian footballer and manager

Personal information
- Full name: Frédéric Chaves d'Aguilar
- Date of birth: 8 October 1918
- Place of birth: Ghent, Belgium
- Date of death: 18 December 2004 (aged 86)
- Place of death: Ghent, Belgium
- Position: Striker

Senior career*
Years	Team	Apps	(Gls)
1935–1950	La Gantoise	266	(113)
1950–1952	Waregem		
1952–1953	Kortrijk		
1953–1954	KRC Gent-Zeehaven		
1954–1957	Waregem		
1958–1960	Kortrijk		

International career
1946–1951	Belgium	20	(8)

Managerial career
- 1954–1957: KSV Waregem
- 1958–1960: KV Kortrijk
- 1966–1972: KSV Waregem
- * Club domestic league appearances and goals

Frédéric Chaves d'Aguilar (8 October 1918 – 18 December 2004) was a Belgian international footballer who played as a striker for a number of Belgian club sides including La Gantoise, KSV Waregem, KV Kortrijk and KRC Gent-Zeehaven. Chaves also scored 8 goals in 20 appearances for the Belgian national side.

== Managerial career ==
Chaves later became a football manager, and coached KSV Waregem and KV Kortrijk
