= Julien Verriest =

Belgian footballer

Personal information
- Full name: Julien Daniël Verriest
- Date of birth: 19 May 1946 (age 80)
- Place of birth: Bruges, Belgium
- Positions: Defender; midfielder

Team information
- Current team: Cercle Brugge

Youth career
- Cercle Brugge

Senior career*
Years	Team	Apps	(Gls)
1965–1981	Cercle Brugge	456	(8)
- R.E. Mouscron
- SV Koekelare

International career^{‡}
	Belgium	0	(0)

Managerial career
- 1981–1982: R.E. Mouscron
- SV Koekelare
- * Club domestic league appearances and goals as of 27 May 2008 ‡ National team caps and goals as of 27 May 2008

Julien "Jules" Verriest (born 19 May 1946 in Bruges) is a retired Belgian football player, who played almost his complete career for Cercle Brugge. Verriest started his football activities as a youth player for Cercle Brugge. Verriest made his debut at the age of 19, in a 0–0 draw against Lierse. His last match for Cercle was on 17 May 1981, a 3–2 win against Beerschot.

In total, Verriest played 492 first team games – a club record – scoring 8 times. Verriest also got selected for Belgium's B-team. He used to play as a defender or midfielder.

After his career at Cercle Brugge, Jules Verriest played for Excelsior Mouscron and SV Koekelare, where he also coached.

In 2000, Jules Verriest was voted Cercle Brugge Player of the Century by the Cercle fans.

== Trivia ==
- Jules Verriest has never been a professional football player, but worked for Ebes, now known as Electrabel, alongside his playing career.
- For the season 2006–2007, Jules Verriest often gives his opinion about Cercle Brugge matches in the popular Belgian newspaper Het Laatste Nieuws.
