= Louis Baes =

Belgian footballer (1899–1992)

Personal information
- Date of birth: 15 June 1899
- Date of death: 10 September 1992 (aged 93)

International career
Years	Team	Apps	(Gls)
1924	Belgium	1	(0)

Louis Baes (15 June 1899 – 10 September 1992) was a Belgian footballer. He played in one match for the Belgium national football team in 1924.
