= Georges Michel (footballer) =

Belgian footballer (1898–1928)

Personal information
- Date of birth: 29 April 1898
- Date of death: 11 June 1928 (aged 30)

International career
Years	Team	Apps	(Gls)
- Belgium

Georges Michel (29 April 1898 – 11 June 1928) was a Belgian footballer. He played in ten matches for the Belgium national football team. This happened between 1919 and 1922.
