= Joseph De Roo =

Joseph R. De Roo (12 July 1932 in Aarsele – 18 October 2001 in Tokyo) was a friar at the Institute of Japanese Studies in Tokyo. He developed the De Roo Kanji classification system which allows one to look up Kanji efficiently.
