= Célestin Nollet =

Belgian footballer

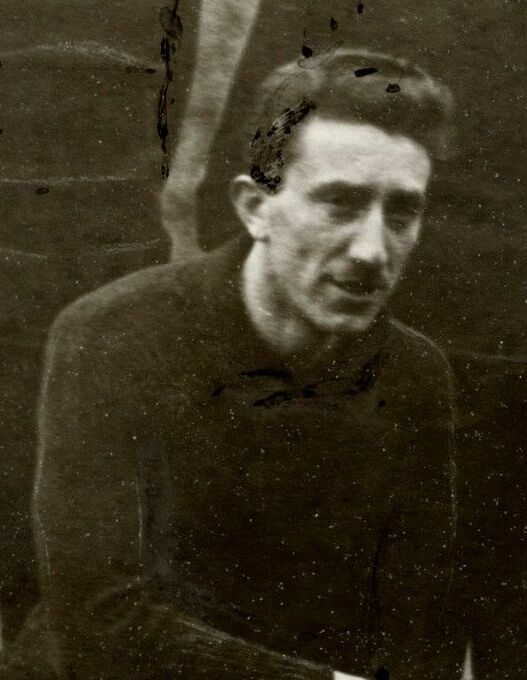

Personal information
- Date of birth: 6 February 1894
- Date of death: 14 August 1975 (aged 81)

International career
Years	Team	Apps	(Gls)
1922	Belgium	2	(0)

Célestin Nollet (French: [selɛstɛ̃ nɔlɛ]; 6 February 1894 – 14 August 1975) was a Belgian footballer. He played in two matches for the Belgium national football team in 1922.
