= 1929–30 Belgian First Division =

30th season of top-tier football in Belgium

Belgian First Division
- Season: 1929–30

Statistics of Belgian First Division in the 1929–30 season.

== Overview ==
Location of teams in Belgian First Division 1929–30

It was contested by 14 teams, and Cercle Brugge K.S.V. won the championship.

== League standings ==
Pos	Team	Pld	W	D	L	GF	GA	GD	Pts	Relegation
1	Cercle Brugge K.S.V.	26	16	5	5	52	32	+20	37	
2	Royal Antwerp FC	26	16	4	6	68	42	+26	36	
3	K.R.C. Mechelen	26	14	3	9	49	39	+10	31	
4	Beerschot	26	13	4	9	53	42	+11	30	
5	R.S.C. Anderlecht	26	13	2	11	52	44	+8	28	
6	Club Brugge K.V.	26	10	7	9	51	47	+4	27	
7	Daring Club	26	11	5	10	59	55	+4	27	
8	Royale Union Saint-Gilloise	26	10	6	10	64	65	−1	26	
9	Lierse S.K.	26	11	3	12	53	59	−6	25	
10	Standard Liège	26	10	4	12	54	59	−5	24	
11	KV Mechelen	26	9	3	14	55	56	−1	21	
12	K Berchem Sport	26	10	1	15	39	50	−11	21	
13	R.R.C. Bruxelles	26	7	4	15	33	63	−30	18	Relegated to Division I
14	RC de Gand	26	4	5	17	34	63	−29	13	Relegated to Division I

== Results ==
Home \ Away	AND	ANT	BEE	BRC	CER	CLU	DAR	RCB	GAN	LIE	KVM	RCM	STA	USG
Anderlecht		0–1	0–1	1–0	1–3	2–2	2–1	3–0	4–3	5–3	2–1	0–1	0–2	3–0
Antwerp	3–4		2–6	2–1	0–2	4–0	3–3	4–1	4–3	0–2	0–1	4–0	3–5	6–2
Beerschot	2–1	0–2		1–3	0–0	3–1	4–4	2–0	3–1	4–2	5–1	0–0	3–2	3–1
Berchem	3–2	0–1	3–0		2–3	0–1	1–3	3–1	4–1	1–2	3–1	1–0	2–1	1–2
Cercle Brugge	2–0	1–4	2–1	1–0		1–1	2–0	1–1	1–3	4–1	1–1	1–2	3–0	7–4
Club Brugge	1–1	2–2	0–0	1–2	1–2		1–2	5–0	3–2	7–2	3–3	0–3	3–1	1–1
Daring Club	3–1	0–3	5–1	2–1	3–2	1–2		2–2	1–1	2–0	6–3	2–6	5–2	2–2
Racing Bruxelles	3–6	0–0	1–4	3–1	0–2	2–0	1–2		1–0	2–1	4–2	2–4	6–3	2–1
Racing Gand	1–2	1–4	0–2	2–2	0–2	3–6	2–1	1–0		1–1	1–2	0–4	0–1	4–4
Lierse	2–1	2–3	2–1	6–2	2–4	3–0	2–1	0–0	3–0		2–0	3–5	2–2	3–4
KV Mechelen	2–0	2–5	3–1	0–2	0–0	4–1	4–5	5–0	5–1	5–1		1–2	4–1	2–4
K.R.C. Mechelen	1–4	1–2	2–1	3–1	1–2	0–3	3–2	4–0	0–0	2–0	1–0		1–1	0–3
Standard Liège	2–4	1–4	1–0	4–0	1–2	1–3	3–1	5–1	2–0	1–2	2–1	3–2		4–4
Union SG	1–3	2–2	3–5	6–0	3–1	2–3	1–0	2–0	1–3	2–4	3–2	3–1	3–3	

Legend: Blue = home team win; Yellow = draw; Red = away team win.
