= Royal Uccle Sport =

Former Belgian football club

Uccle Sport
- Full name: Royal Uccle Sport
- Founded: 1901 (as Uccle Sport)
- Dissolved: 1990 (merged with Royal Léopold)
Home colours

Royal Uccle Sport was a Belgian football club from the municipality of Uccle, Brussels. It was created in 1901 as Uccle Sport and it registered with the Belgian Football Association in 1905 to receive the matricule n°15.

== History ==
In 1914, the club won the second division and was thus promoted to the first division to take place in 1919 (because of World War I). The club finished 10th (on 12) and then 12th, and was back at the top level in 1922–23 for one season. After a long spell at the second level, R. Uccle Sport (as it was then known since 1926) played one more season in the first division in 1947–48. In 1990, the club merged with Royal Léopold Uccle Forestoise to become Royal Uccle Léopold FC.

== Honours ==
- Belgian Second Division:
  - Winners (3): 1913–14, 1921–22, 1946–47
- Belgian Third Division:
  - Winners (1): 1952–53
