= Victor Lemberechts =

Belgian footballer

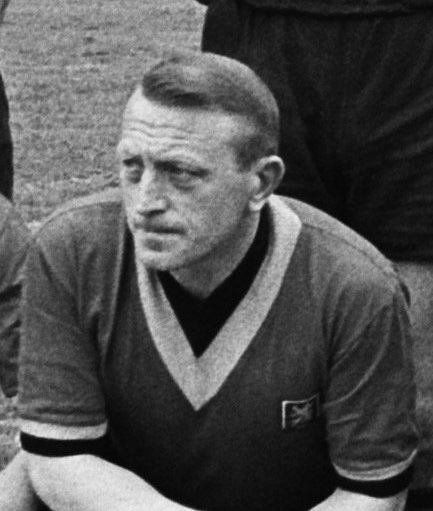

Personal information
- Date of birth: 18 May 1924
- Place of birth: Mechelen, Belgium
- Date of death: 24 June 1992 (aged 68)
- Place of death: Belgium
- Height: 1.73 m (5 ft 8 in)
- Position: Striker

Senior career*
Years	Team	Apps	(Gls)
1942–1956	KV Mechelen	324	(128)

International career
1945–1955	Belgium	42	(14)
- * Club domestic league appearances and goals

Victor "Torreke" Lemberechts (18 May 1924 – 24 June 1992) was a Belgian international footballer who played as striker.

Lemberechts played professionally for KV Mechelen between 1942 and 1956. He made 346 appearances and scored 128 goals.

Lemberechts also earned 42 caps for the Belgian national side between 1945 and 1955, scoring 14 goals, including playing in two FIFA World Cup qualifying matches.
