= 1926–27 Belgian First Division =

27th season of top-tier football in Belgium

Belgian First Division
- Season: 1926–27

Statistics of Belgian First Division in the 1926–27 season.

== Overview ==
Location of teams in Belgian First Division 1926–27

It was contested by 14 teams, and Cercle Brugge K.S.V. won the championship.

== League standings ==
| Pos | Team | Pld | W | D | L | GF | GA | GD | Pts | Relegation |
|---|---|---|---|---|---|---|---|---|---|---|
| 1 | Cercle Brugge K.S.V. | 26 | 14 | 7 | 5 | 64 | 44 | +20 | 35 | |
| 2 | Beerschot | 26 | 14 | 5 | 7 | 53 | 31 | +22 | 33 | |
| 3 | Standard Liège | 26 | 15 | 2 | 9 | 85 | 58 | +27 | 32 | |
| 4 | Daring Club | 26 | 11 | 10 | 5 | 49 | 46 | +3 | 32 | |
| 5 | K Berchem Sport | 26 | 11 | 7 | 8 | 51 | 43 | +8 | 29 | |
| 6 | Royale Union Saint-Gilloise | 26 | 12 | 3 | 11 | 55 | 47 | +8 | 27 | |
| 7 | RC de Gand | 26 | 9 | 8 | 9 | 61 | 59 | +2 | 26 | |
| 8 | Club Brugge K.V. | 26 | 10 | 6 | 10 | 51 | 56 | −5 | 26 | |
| 9 | La Gantoise | 26 | 11 | 4 | 11 | 56 | 63 | −7 | 26 | |
| 10 | K.R.C. Mechelen | 26 | 8 | 8 | 10 | 59 | 45 | +14 | 24 | |
| 11 | Royal Antwerp FC | 26 | 8 | 6 | 12 | 41 | 56 | −15 | 22 | |
| 12 | R.R.C. Bruxelles | 26 | 7 | 7 | 12 | 40 | 60 | −20 | 21 | |
| 13 | KV Mechelen | 26 | 6 | 5 | 15 | 46 | 63 | −17 | 17 | Relegated to Division I |
| 14 | CS La Forestoise | 26 | 4 | 6 | 16 | 43 | 83 | −40 | 14 | Relegated to Division I |

== Results ==
| Home \ Away | ANT | BEE | BRC | CER | CLU | DAR | FOR | RCB | GNT | GAN | KVM | RCM | STA | USG |
|---|---|---|---|---|---|---|---|---|---|---|---|---|---|---|
| Antwerp | | 2–0 | 0–4 | 1–1 | 0–0 | 1–2 | 2–1 | 2–0 | 4–1 | 1–1 | 3–3 | 0–3 | 1–4 | 2–3 |
| Beerschot | 1–0 | | 1–1 | 1–1 | 3–0 | 2–1 | 2–1 | 6–1 | 0–2 | 4–2 | 0–2 | 2–1 | 4–1 | 3–0 |
| Berchem | 2–2 | 2–1 | | 3–0 | 3–0 | 1–1 | 3–1 | 4–0 | 2–0 | 2–4 | 4–2 | 1–1 | 2–4 | 1–1 |
| Cercle Brugge | 5–2 | 1–1 | 3–0 | | 3–1 | 5–0 | 5–1 | 0–0 | 2–2 | 3–0 | 3–2 | 2–2 | 5–2 | 3–2 |
| Club Brugge | 3–4 | 3–2 | 1–1 | 1–4 | | 1–1 | 2–1 | 4–1 | 3–1 | 2–1 | 2–3 | 5–3 | 1–0 | 2–1 |
| Daring Club | 2–1 | 3–3 | 1–0 | 5–6 | 3–3 | | 5–1 | 0–0 | 6–2 | 1–1 | 2–1 | 3–2 | 3–2 | 1–0 |
| La Forestoise | 3–4 | 1–6 | 3–4 | 2–0 | 0–5 | 0–0 | | 1–1 | 2–4 | 2–2 | 4–1 | 1–3 | 3–3 | 1–0 |
| Racing Bruxelles | 4–0 | 0–0 | 2–0 | 2–3 | 5–2 | 2–2 | 6–2 | | 4–1 | 1–2 | 0–0 | 2–1 | 1–3 | 3–1 |
| La Gantoise | 3–1 | 2–1 | 2–1 | 0–0 | 4–1 | 4–0 | 6–3 | 4–0 | | 2–1 | 2–3 | 1–1 | 4–4 | 1–5 |
| Racing Gand | 1–2 | 0–3 | 5–2 | 4–1 | 2–2 | 1–1 | 4–4 | 4–0 | 5–2 | | 2–1 | 2–0 | 1–2 | 1–5 |
| KV Mechelen | 2–1 | 1–3 | 1–4 | 1–3 | 2–3 | 2–3 | 0–0 | 1–1 | 3–5 | 4–3 | | 2–4 | 2–5 | 4–0 |
| K.R.C. Mechelen | 1–1 | 0–1 | 1–2 | 1–2 | 4–1 | 2–2 | 2–3 | 4–1 | 9–1 | 4–4 | 0–0 | | 5–2 | 0–0 |
| Standard Liège | 1–2 | 3–2 | 5–1 | 5–1 | 3–3 | 0–1 | 8–2 | 9–1 | 1–1 | 1–4 | 3–2 | 4–2 | | 6–3 |
| Union SG | 5–2 | 0–1 | 1–1 | 3–2 | 1–0 | 3–0 | 5–0 | 4–2 | 3–2 | 5–1 | 3–1 | 0–3 | 1–4 | |

Legend: Blue = home team win; Yellow = draw; Red = away team win.
