= RRC Tournai =

Belgian football club

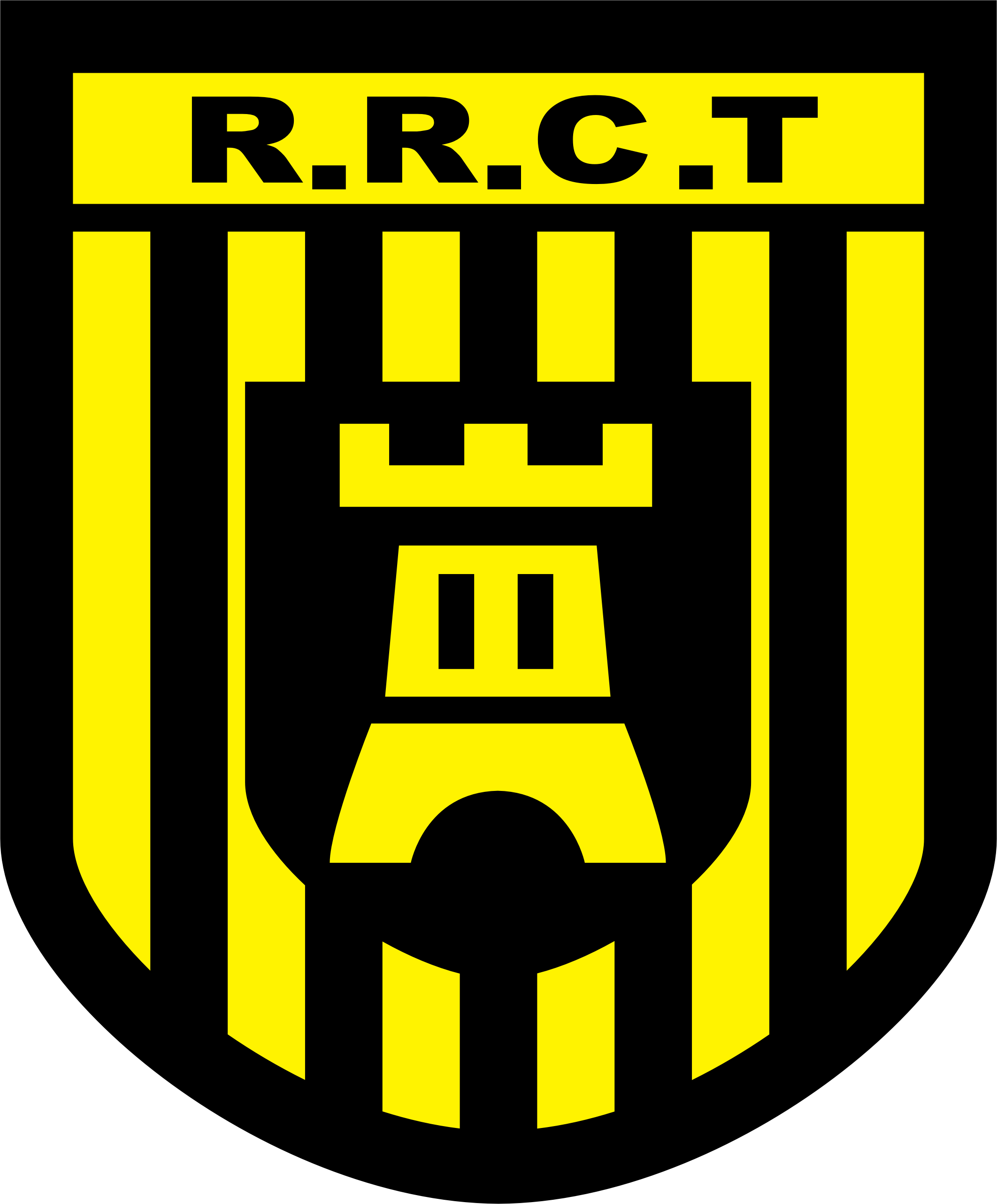
- Full name: Royal Racing Club Tournaisien
- Nickname: les Rats
- Founded: 1908
- Dissolved: 2002
- Stadium: Drève de Maire
- Capacity: 7,500
Home colours	Away colours

Royal Racing Club Tournaisien was a Belgian football club from the city of Tournai, Hainaut from 1909 to 2002. Its matricule was the n°36.

== History ==
It was founded in 1909 as "Racing Club Tournaisien" and then changed to RRC Tournaisien in 1934. The club first reached the second division in 1955 and qualified quickly for the first division (in 1958–59). Relegated at the end of the season, the club then decayed and fell off to the third division in 1970. In 2002 the Racing Club merged with its neighbour of RUS Tournaisienne to become the RFC Tournai, which most recently competed in the Belgian Division 2 before bankruptcy in 2026.
