= RCS La Forestoise =

Belgian association football club in Brussels

- Full name: Royal Cercle Sportif La Forestoise
- Nickname: Suzannes
- Founded: 20 May 1909; 117 years ago
- Dissolved: July 1, 1996; 30 years ago
- Ground: Stade Communal Adrien Bertelson, Forest, Brussels
- Capacity: 20,000
Home colours	Away colours

Royal Cercle Sportif La Forestoise was a Belgian football club from the municipality of Forest, Brussels. It was founded in 1909 and received the matricule n°51 following its registration to the FA in 1911. The club first reached the first division in 1926 but it was yet too weak to survive at that level and was back in the second division for the next season.

The best years of the club were the 1940s since it played 4 seasons at the top level (1942 to 1947, missing the 1944–45 season due to World War II). The Green and White achieved their best ranking in 1944 with a 10th position.

In 1996 it merged with Royal Uccle Léopold to become Royal Léopold Uccle Forestoise and the matricule n°51 was consequently erased.

== Honours ==
- Belgian Second Division:
  - Winners (1): 1941–42

== Notable players ==
- Raymond Braine, Belgian international, won several championships in Belgium and Czechoslovakia
- Florent Lambrechts, Belgian champion in 1929 and 1931, top scorer of the Belgian championship in 1936 with 36 goals
