= List of Belgium international footballers =

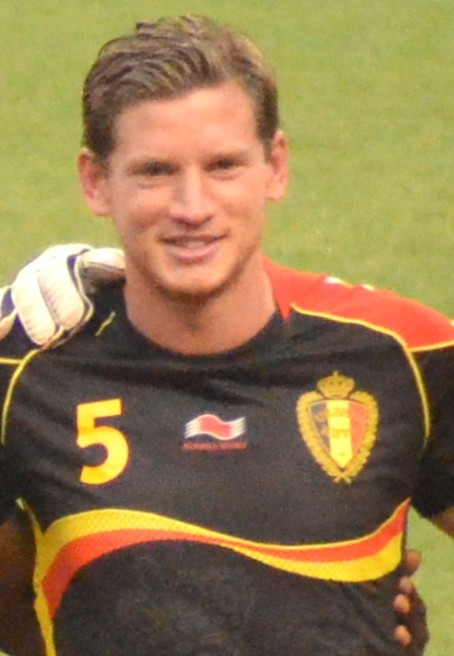
Defender Jan Vertonghen is the men's overall record holder with 157 caps.

Romelu Lukaku is the all-time top scorer, having scored 94 goals in 135 matches.

The Belgium national football team represents the country of Belgium in international association football. It is fielded by the Royal Belgian Football Association, the governing body of football in Belgium, and competes as a member of the Union of European Football Associations (UEFA), which encompasses the countries of Europe. As over 600 players have featured in the team since it started officially registering its players in 1904, only players with more than 20 official caps are included.

Despite the first Belgium international game taking place on 1 May 1904, the first player to reach 25 caps for his country was Armand Swartenbroeks, who played his 25th match against England on 1 November 1923.

All players with at least 35 caps are awarded a Medal of Recognition by the Belgian Football Association; also players whose careers are ended by an injury after 20 games receive this award.

== Players ==
This list is about male Belgium national football team players with more than twenty appearances. For players with at least five caps, see List of Belgium international footballers (5–20 caps). For players with one to four caps, see List of Belgium international footballers (1–4 caps). For the current men's national team squad, see Belgium national football team#Current squad.

Key
	Named to the national team in the past year
Bold	Still playing competitive football
#x	Played in one or more friendlies which are not FIFA-recognised, either due to an excessive number of substitutions according to the Laws of the Game or because the request to have a match treated as official was sent too late to the FIFA. Three matches currently fall under this category, namely the friendlies against Romania on 14 November 2012, against Luxembourg on 26 May 2014 and against Czech Republic on 5 June 2017. These three matches are recognised by the Belgian FA and therefore included in this list. The number besides the '#' symbol denotes the number of disputed matches for each player.
§x	Played one or more matches for Belgium at the 1920, 1924 or 1928 Summer Olympics, which are not counted as official matches by the Belgian FA and therefore not included in this list. Note that no caps were given for the 1920 Final as FIFA has not released the report of this game and on the official website it is stated that the game was abandoned, without any official result posted. The number besides the '§' symbol denotes the number of matches not counted for each player.

Appearances and goals are composed of FIFA World Cup and UEFA European Championship matches and each competition's required qualification matches, as well as UEFA Nations League matches and numerous international friendly tournaments and matches. Statistics correct as of 25 September 2026.

Belgium national team football players with over 20 appearances
Rank	Player	Caps	Selections	Goals	Minutes played	Date of debut	Debut against	Date of last match	Last match against	Ref.
1	Jan Vertonghen ^{#3}	157	142	10	13,206	2 June 2007	Portugal	1 July 2024	France	
2	**Axel Witsel** ^{#2}	140	127	12	11,123	26 March 2008	Morocco	10 July 2026	Spain	
3	**Romelu Lukaku** ^{#3}	133	116	93	8,461	3 March 2010	Croatia	25 September 2026	Italy	
4	Toby Alderweireld ^{#2}	127	129	5	10,967	29 May 2009	Chile	1 December 2022	Croatia	
5	Eden Hazard ^{#1}	126	123	33	8,698	19 November 2008	Luxembourg	1 December 2022	Croatia	
6	**Kevin De Bruyne** ^{#3}	125	96	38	9,922	19 May 2010	Bulgaria	25 September 2026	Italy	
7	**Thibaut Courtois** ^{#1}	115	108	0	10,352	10 August 2011	Slovenia	10 July 2026	Spain	
8	Dries Mertens ^{#2}	109	120	21	6,078	9 February 2011	Finland	1 December 2022	Croatia	
9	Jan Ceulemans	96	99	22	8,256	26 March 1977	Netherlands	27 February 1991	Luxembourg	
10	Timmy Simons	94	114	6	7,634	25 April 2001	Czech Republic	13 November 2016	Estonia	
11	**Youri Tielemans** ^{#1}	91	65	15	6,121	9 November 2016	Netherlands	25 September 2026	Italy	
12	Vincent Kompany	89	92	4	7,261	18 February 2004	France	11 June 2019	England	
13	Marouane Fellaini ^{#3}	87	97	18	6,371	7 February 2007	Czech Republic	10 July 2018	France	
14	Eric Gerets	86	94	3	7,460	27 September 1975	East Germany	27 March 1991	Wales	
14	Franky Van der Elst	86	93	1	7,388	19 December 1984	Greece	25 June 1998	South Korea	
16	Daniel Van Buyten ^{#2}	85	98	10	6,983	28 February 2001	San Marino	5 July 2014	Argentina	
16	Thomas Vermaelen ^{#2}	85	103	2	6,398	1 March 2006	Luxembourg	2 July 2021	Italy	
18	Enzo Scifo	84	87	18	6,974	6 June 1984	Hungary	25 June 1998	South Korea	
19	**Thomas Meunier**	83	61	10	5,801	14 November 2013	Colombia	1 July 2026	Spain	
20	Mousa Dembélé	82	106	5	4,779	20 May 2006	Slovakia	9 November 2018	Iceland	
21	Paul Van Himst	81	83	30	7,038	2 October 1960	Netherlands	7 December 1974	East Germany	
22	Bart Goor	78	80	13	6,207	3 February 1999	Cyprus	20 August 2008	Germany	
22	**Yannick Carrasco** ^{#1}	78	67	11	4,691	26 May 2014	Luxembourg	1 July 2024	France	
24	Georges Grün	77	81	6	6,485	13 June 1984	Yugoslavia	15 November 1995	Cyprus	
25	Lorenzo Staelens	70	82	8	5,778	26 May 1990	Romania	19 June 2000	Turkey	
25	Marc Wilmots	70	80	29	4,947	26 May 1990	Romania	17 June 2002	Brazil	
25	**Timothy Castagne**	70	33	2	5,300	7 September 2018	Scotland	25 September 2026	Italy	
28	Vic Mees	68	73	3	5,982	2 January 1949	Spain	2 October 1960	Netherlands	
29	Georges Heylens	67	68	0	5,972	8 March 1961	West Germany	18 April 1973	East Germany	
30	Nacer Chadli ^{#2}	66	83	8	3,554	9 February 2011	Finland	2 July 2021	Italy	
31	Jef Jurion	64	68	9	5,745	25 December 1955	France	21 May 1967	Poland	
31	Jean-Marie Pfaff	64	84	0	5,761	22 May 1976	Netherlands	23 September 1987	Bulgaria	
33	Marc Degryse	63	67	23	5,180	5 September 1984	Argentina	14 December 1996	Netherlands	
33	Frank Vercauteren	63	71	9	5,090	16 November 1977	Northern Ireland	12 October 1988	Brazil	
35	Bernard Voorhoof	61	63	30	5,490	15 April 1928	France	21 April 1940	Netherlands	
36	Kevin Mirallas ^{#2}	60	74	10	2,825	22 August 2007	Serbia	27 March 2018	Saudi Arabia	
37	Michel Preud'homme	58	72	0	5,177	2 May 1979	Austria	17 December 1994	Spain	
38	Éric Deflandre	57	67	0	3,910	14 December 1996	Netherlands	12 October 2005	Lithuania	
38	Émile Mpenza	57	59	19	3,890	11 February 1997	Northern Ireland	14 October 2009	Estonia	
38	Wilfried Van Moer	57	61	9	4,294	22 October 1966	Switzerland	1 July 1982	Soviet Union	
38	**Leandro Trossard**	57		14	3,157	5 September 2020	Denmark	10 July 2026	Spain	
42	Louis Carré	56	58	0	5,070	17 October 1948	France	2 March 1958	West Germany	
42	Jef Mermans	56	67	28	5,022	15 December 1945	France	11 November 1956	France	
42	Mbo Mpenza	56	66	3	2,648	29 March 1997	Wales	12 September 2007	Kazakhstan	
42	Luc Nilis	56	60	10	3,600	26 March 1988	Hungary	19 June 2000	Turkey	
46	Michel Renquin	55	62	0	4,595	22 May 1976	Netherlands	23 September 1987	Bulgaria	
46	Wesley Sonck	55	55	24	3,495	2 June 2001	Latvia	3 March 2010	Croatia	
46	**Michy Batshuayi** ^{#1}	55	76	27	2,613	28 March 2015	Cyprus	26 March 2024	England	
49	Danny Boffin	53	70	1	3,234	23 August 1989	Denmark	26 May 2002	Costa Rica	
50	Raymond Braine ^{§3}	52	52	23	4,590	15 March 1925	Netherlands	27 May 1939	Poland	
50	Steven Defour ^{#2}	52	84	2	3,477	11 May 2006	Saudi Arabia	14 November 2017	Japan	
52	Armand Swartenbroeks ^{§3}	50	50	0	4,324	20 April 1913	Netherlands	11 March 1928	Netherlands	
52	René Vandereycken	50	60	3	4,232	15 November 1975	France	8 June 1986	Iraq	
52	Gert Verheyen	50	57	10	3,533	12 October 1994	Denmark	17 June 2002	Brazil	
55	Wilfried Puis	49	50	9	4,270	13 May 1962	Italy	27 September 1975	East Germany	
56	Pol Anoul	48	50	20	4,350	4 May 1947	Netherlands	26 September 1954	West Germany	
56	Pierre Hanon	48	58	3	4,259	14 October 1956	Netherlands	19 October 1969	Yugoslavia	
56	Erwin Vandenbergh	48	58	20	4,028	19 December 1979	Scotland	27 March 1991	Wales	
56	Yves Vanderhaeghe	48	49	2	3,738	30 May 1999	Peru	12 October 2005	Lithuania	
56	**Jérémy Doku**	48		7	3,157	5 September 2020	Denmark	10 July 2026	Spain	
61	Rik Coppens	47	50	21	4,260	13 March 1949	Netherlands	4 October 1959	Netherlands	
61	**Thorgan Hazard**	47	57	9	2,755	29 May 2013	United States	1 December 2022	Croatia	
63	Ludo Coeck	46	47	4	3,762	8 September 1974	Iceland	19 June 1984	Denmark	
63	Walter Meeuws	46	52	0	4,027	26 January 1977	Italy	29 February 1984	West Germany	
65	**Christian Benteke**	45	81	18	2,193	19 May 2010	Bulgaria	29 March 2026	Burkina Faso	
66	Pierre Braine ^{§3}	44	44	4	3,858	15 January 1922	France	27 December 1930	France	
66	Swat Van der Elst	44	49	14	3,397	31 October 1973	Norway	9 November 1983	Switzerland	
68	Geert De Vlieger	43	55	0	3,497	5 February 1999	Greece	1 March 2006	Luxembourg	
69	Michel De Wolf	42	66	1	3,453	15 October 1980	Republic of Ireland	7 September 1994	Armenia	
69	Torreke Lemberechts	42	43	14	3,780	13 May 1945	Luxembourg	19 January 1955	Italy	
69	Nico Van Kerckhoven	42	47	3	3,215	29 May 1996	Italy	17 June 2002	Brazil	
72	Philippe Albert	41	53	5	3,376	19 April 1987	Republic of Ireland	6 September 1997	Netherlands	
72	Robert Paverick	41	41	0	3,690	31 March 1935	Netherlands	30 May 1946	Netherlands	
72	**Hans Vanaken**	41		8	2,272	7 September 2018	Yugoslavia	25 September 2026	Italy	
75	Lei Clijsters	40	53	3	2,734	30 March 1983	East Germany	27 March 1991	Wales	
75	Christian Piot	40	41	1	3,600	19 October 1969	Yugoslavia	26 March 1977	Netherlands	
77	Nicolas Lombaerts ^{#1}	39	65	3	2,871	11 May 2006	Saudi Arabia	29 March 2016	Portugal	
77	Jean Nicolay	39	47	0	3,464	24 May 1959	Austria	8 October 1967	Poland	
79	Philippe Clement	38	47	1	2,749	25 March 1998	Norway	6 June 2007	Finland	
79	Stéphane Demol	38	38	1	3,105	23 April 1986	Bulgaria	20 November 1991	Germany	
79	Alfons Van Brandt	38	43	0	3,380	1 November 1950	Netherlands	8 December 1957	Turkey	
79	Paul Van Den Berg	38	43	16	3,313	31 March 1957	Spain	8 October 1967	Poland	
83	Marc Emmers	37	39	2	2,839	19 January 1988	Israel	7 September 1994	Armenia	
83	Florimond Van Halme ^{§2}	37	38	1	3,240	5 May 1921	Italy	25 May 1930	France	
85	Nico Claesen	36	41	12	2,732	12 October 1983	Scotland	26 June 1990	England	
85	Glen De Boeck	36	46	1	2,409	6 October 1993	Gabon	21 August 2002	Poland	
85	Johan Walem	36	47	2	2,648	20 November 1991	Germany	17 June 2002	Brazil	
85	**Charles De Ketelaere**	36		9	1,685	11 November 2020	Switzerland	25 September 2026	Italy	
85	**Arthur Theate**	36		1	2,755	16 November 2021	Wales	1 July 2026	Senegal	
90	Thomas Buffel	35	37	6	2,502	12 October 2002	Andorra	6 February 2013	Slovakia	
90	Julien Cools	35	37	2	2,847	1 June 1974	Scotland	22 June 1980	West Germany	
90	Jean Dockx	35	42	3	2,588	22 November 1967	Luxembourg	15 November 1975	France	
90	Luc Millecamps	35	35	0	2,956	12 September 1979	Norway	9 November 1983	Switzerland	
90	Léon Semmeling	35	42	2	2,899	20 May 1961	Switzerland	18 November 1973	Netherlands	
90	**Jason Denayer**	35	54	1	2,613	31 March 2015	Israel	29 March 2022	Burkina Faso	
90	Simon Mignolet	35	118	0	3,082	25 May 2011	Austria	14 June 2022	Poland	
97	Arnold Badjou	34	35	0	2,933	13 April 1930	France	18 May 1939	France	
97	Jean Capelle	34	35	19	3,005	29 March 1931	Netherlands	18 May 1939	France	
97	Nicolaas Hoydonckx ^{§3}	34	34	0	3,060	12 February 1928	Irish Free State	26 November 1933	Denmark	
97	Jean Thissen	34	35	0	2,992	10 January 1968	Israel	26 October 1977	Netherlands	
97	Eric Van Meir	34	58	1	2,513	6 October 1993	Gabon	14 June 2002	Russia	
97	**Dodi Lukébakio**	34		7	1,346	11 November 2020	Switzerland	25 September 2026	Italy	
103	Désiré Bastin ^{§2}	33	33	7	2,970	31 August 1920	Netherlands	17 April 1932	Netherlands	
103	Jan De Bie ^{§5}	33	33	0	2,970	31 August 1920	Netherlands	8 June 1930	Portugal	
103	Filip De Wilde	33	68	0	2,668	23 August 1989	Denmark	19 June 2000	Turkey	
103	Nico Dewalque	33	34	0	2,910	28 October 1967	France	27 September 1975	West Germany	
103	Raoul Lambert	33	38	18	2,745	20 April 1966	France	26 October 1977	Netherlands	
103	Martin Lippens	33	34	2	2,863	31 March 1957	Spain	25 December 1963	France	
103	Rie Meert	33	48	0	2,860	24 December 1944	France	31 March 1957	Spain	
103	Jean Plaskie	33	35	0	2,970	22 March 1964	Netherlands	26 May 1971	Denmark	
103	Rudi Smidts	33	35	1	2,578	2 September 1992	Czechoslovakia	11 October 1997	Wales	
103	Jan Verheyen	33	50	0	2,498	24 March 1965	Republic of Ireland	25 April 1976	Netherlands	
103	Louis Versyp ^{§1}	33	35	7	2,902	13 April 1930	France	8 March 1936	France	
103	**Amadou Onana**	33		1	2,135	3 June 2022	Netherlands	6 July 2026	United States	
103	**Loïs Openda**	33		3	1,317	8 June 2022	Poland	31 March 2026	Mexico	
116	Jacques Stockman	32	40	13	2,694	13 April 1958	Netherlands	21 May 1967	Poland	
116	Erwin Vandendaele	32	36	1	2,836	15 November 1970	France	26 January 1977	Italy	
116	Patrick Vervoort	32	41	3	2,548	23 April 1986	Bulgaria	11 September 1991	Luxembourg	
116	Divock Origi	32	59	3	1,148	26 May 2014	Luxembourg	29 March 2022	Burkina Faso	
116	**Leander Dendoncker**	32	59	1	1,996	7 June 2015	France	17 June 2023	Austria	
121	Alexandre Czerniatynski	31	42	8	1,925	9 September 1981	France	2 July 1994	Germany	
121	Marcel Dries	31	41	0	2,747	19 April 1953	Netherlands	14 June 1959	Austria	
121	Luis Oliveira Barroso	31	31	7	2,246	26 February 1992	Tunisia	30 March 1999	Egypt	
121	Emile Stijnen	31	31	1	2,790	1 May 1932	France	18 May 1939	France	
121	Jelle Van Damme	31	40	0	1,811	29 March 2003	Croatia	14 August 2013	France	
121	Dedryck Boyata	31	52	0	2,203	12 October 2010	Austria	11 June 2022	Wales	
127	**Radja Nainggolan** ^{#1}	30	39	6	1,978	26 May 2014	Luxembourg	27 March 2018	Saudi Arabia	
127	Stijn Stijnen	30	31	0	2,604	11 May 2006	Saudi Arabia	12 August 2009	Czech Republic	
129	Henri Diricx	29	58	1	2,573	10 June 1952	Italy	22 May 1960	Bulgaria	
129	Anthony Vanden Borre ^{#1}	29	48	1	1,778	28 April 2004	Turkey	11 November 2014	Wales	
131	August Hellemans ^{§1}	28	29	0	2,520	5 June 1928	Netherlands	21 January 1934	France	
131	Bruno Versavel	28	30	4	2,325	12 October 1988	Brazil	7 June 1996	Macedonia	
131	**Alexis Saelemaekers**	28		3	1,096	8 October 2020	Ivory Coast	10 July 2026	Spain	
131	**Wout Faes**	28		0	2,218	8 June 2022	Poland	9 June 2025	Wales	
135	Walter Baseggio	27	31	1	1,799	27 March 1999	Bulgaria	9 February 2005	Egypt	
136	Bertrand Crasson	26	37	1	1,769	1 May 1991	Germany	15 August 2001	Finland	
136	Denis Houf	26	29	5	2,370	17 June 1954	England	20 May 1961	Switzerland	
136	Philippe Léonard	26	37	0	1,588	22 April 1995	United States	15 November 2006	Poland	
136	Maurice Martens	26	36	2	1,847	7 November 1971	Luxembourg	6 June 1980	Romania	
136	Dirk Medved	26	41	1	2,009	11 September 1991	Luxembourg	11 February 1997	Northern Ireland	
136	Stanley Vanden Eynde	26	26	9	2,284	3 May 1931	Netherlands	13 March 1938	Luxembourg	
136	**Zeno Debast**	26		1	1,897	22 September 2022	Wales	31 March 2026	Mexico	
136	**Maxim De Cuyper**	26		4	1,698	5 June 2024	Montenegro	25 September 2026	Italy	
144	Gilles De Bilde	25	27	3	1,192	16 November 1994	Macedonia	16 August 2000	Bulgaria	
145	Hugo Broos	24	31	1	1,972	13 March 1974	East Germany	22 June 1986	Spain	
145	Luigi Pieroni	24	28	2	1,008	18 February 2004	France	26 March 2008	Morocco	
145	Louis Saeys	24	24	9	2,190	9 May 1907	Netherlands	15 March 1914	Netherlands	
145	Camille Van Hoorden	24	24	4	2,192	1 May 1904	France	28 April 1912	Netherlands	
145	Oscar Verbeeck ^{§3}	24	24	0	2,160	25 January 1914	France	5 October 1924	Denmark	
145	René Verheyen	24	49	3	1,275	22 May 1976	Netherlands	16 June 1984	France	
151	Ferdinand Adams	23	23	9	1,980	5 October 1924	Denmark	20 July 1930	Paraguay	
151	Charles Cambier	23	23	3	2,086	1 May 1904	France	24 February 1914	England	
151	Pierre Dalem	23	24	0	2,070	31 March 1935	Netherlands	29 January 1939	Germany	
151	Robert De Veen	23	23	26	2,130	22 April 1906	France	1 May 1913	Italy	
151	Johan Devrindt	23	29	15	1,999	30 September 1964	Netherlands	27 September 1975	West Germany	
151	Théodore Nouwens	23	23	0	2,026	4 November 1928	Netherlands	9 April 1933	Netherlands	
151	André Piters	23	24	7	2,070	3 April 1955	Netherlands	4 October 1961	Sweden	
151	Jan Van Der Auwera	23	26	0	2,070	24 April 1949	Republic of Ireland	14 March 1954	Portugal	
151	Laurent Verbiest	23	28	0	2,027	2 October 1960	Netherlands	29 December 1965	Bulgaria	
151	**Orel Mangala**	23		0	1,205	26 March 2022	Republic of Ireland	17 November 2024	Israel	
161	Vital Borkelmans	22	35	0	1,332	23 August 1989	Denmark	25 June 1998	South Korea	
161	Régis Genaux	22	27	0	1,841	26 February 1992	Tunisia	26 April 2000	Norway	
161	Guillaume Gillet ^{#1}	22	35	1	1,311	13 October 2007	Finland	29 March 2016	Portugal	
161	Maurice Gillis ^{§1}	22	22	8	1,890	7 May 1922	Netherlands	8 January 1928	Austria	
161	Carl Hoefkens	22	29	1	1,426	5 June 1999	South Korea	20 August 2008	Germany	
161	Constant Huysmans	22	24	0	2,010	19 April 1953	Netherlands	4 October 1959	Netherlands	
161	Joseph Musch ^{§2}	22	22	3	1,906	30 April 1911	France	23 March 1924	Netherlands	
161	Odilon Polleunis	22	29	10	1,716	7 April 1968	Netherlands	27 September 1975	Germany	
161	Eddy Voordeckers	22	29	4	1,398	20 September 1978	Norway	11 September 1985	Poland	
170	Yves Baré	21	28	0	1,890	4 October 1961	Sweden	8 September 1967	Poland	
170	Jean Claessens	21	21	0	1,820	17 April 1932	Netherlands	8 March 1936	France	
170	Jan Diddens	21	22	2	1,800	14 March 1926	Netherlands	20 July 1930	Paraguay	
170	André Fierens ^{§3}	21	21	0	1,846	31 August 1920	Netherlands	24 May 1925	Switzerland	
170	Gaston Hubin	21	21	1	1,890	26 October 1908	Sweden	26 April 1914	Netherlands	
170	Jacques Moeschal ^{§3}	21	21	3	1,890	11 March 1928	Netherlands	31 May 1931	Portugal	
170	Richard Orlans	21	26	5	1,823	5 June 1955	Czechoslovakia	24 December 1961	Bulgaria	
170	Peter Van Der Heyden	21	32	1	1,572	25 April 2001	Czech Republic	24 March 2007	Portugal	
