= List of Belgium national football team captains =

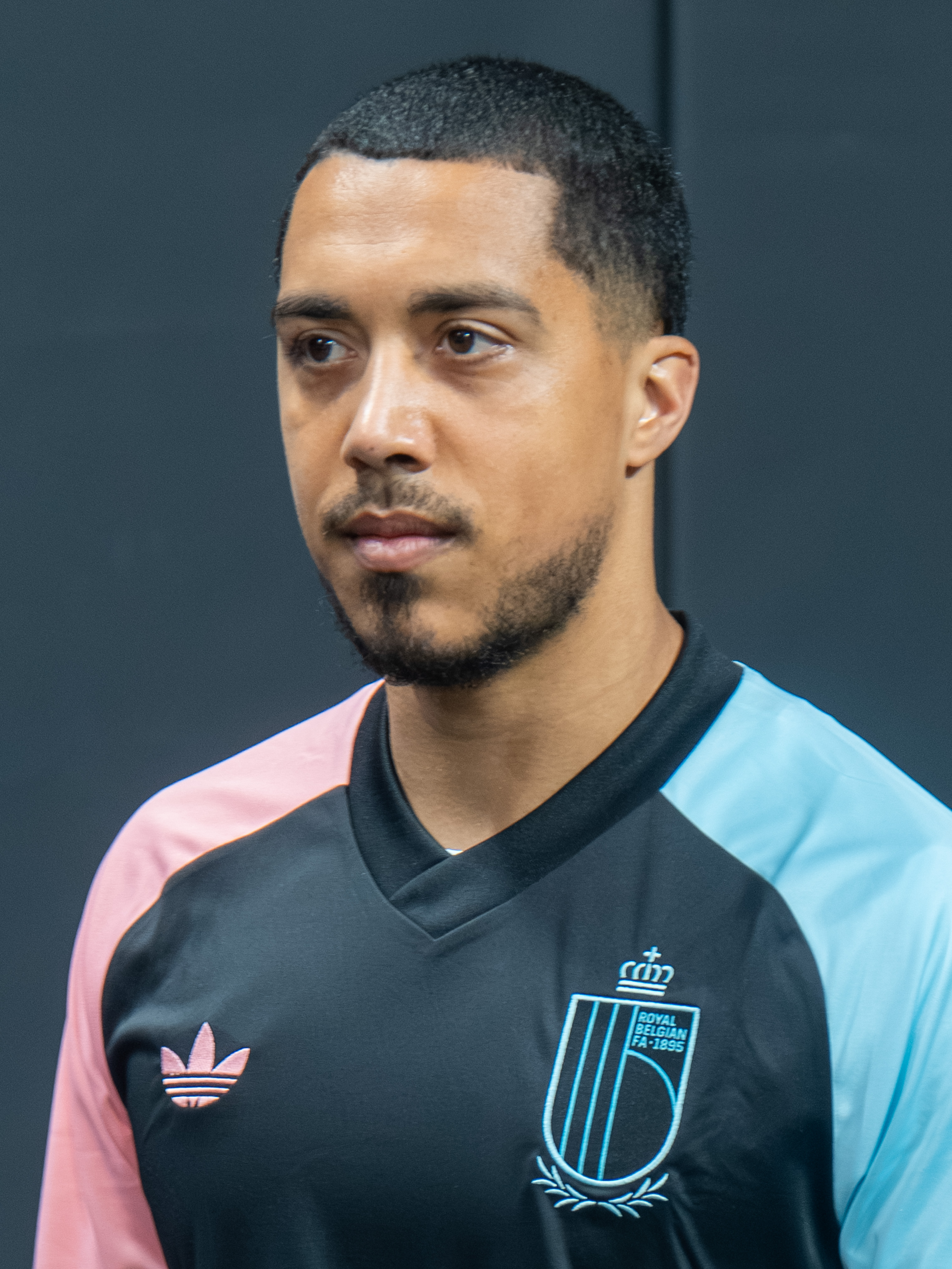
Youri Tielemans is the captain of the national side.

As of March 2016, the Belgium national team has been led by at least 89 different captains; 86 different players started an international game as captain, but due to substitutions the total number is higher. At least 15 pure forwards and eight goalkeepers have fulfilled this role but most often Red Devils in defensive positions and midfielders were assigned as captain, as is usually the case in association football. Until 2011 under Dick Advocaat and Georges Leekens the former Belgium U-23 captain Thomas Vermaelen was chosen as national squad's leader, but during an injury period he left the captaincy to Vincent Kompany, who became the new permanent captain. After several periods of injuries and missing out UEFA Euro 2016, Kompany gradually lost his position as captain to Eden Hazard by 2017. Following Hazard's retirement from international duty in 2022, Kevin De Bruyne was appointed as captain. On September 2025 Tielemans become the new permanent captain. Tielemans is the ideal bridge between the fading "Golden Generation" and Belgium's highly promising youth movement.

== All-time captain list ==
The following table shows which Belgian footballers started international games as captain, and during which period. Players that received the captain's armband because of a substitution or expulsion during a match are not counted.

Players still active for Belgium are highlighted

Last updated: Brazil vs. Belgium, 6 July 2018. Statistics include official FIFA-recognised matches only.

List of captains of the Belgium national football team
#	Name	Period	Position	Times	Active
1	Camille Van Hoorden	1904–11	MF	12	
2	Ernest Moreau de Melen	1905	DF	1	
3	Edgard Poelmans	1906–11	DF	4	
4	René Feye	1907	MF	1	
5	Charles Cambier	1907–10	MF	6	
6	Max Tobias	1908	MF	1	
7	Marcel Feye	1910	GK	4	
8	Émile Andrieu	1912	DF	5	
9	Oscar Bossaert	1912–13	DF	7	
10	Gaston Hubin	1913	DF	1	
11	Henri Leroy	1914	GK	1	
12	Joseph Thys	1914	MF	1	
13	Armand Swartenbroeks	1914–28	DF	37	
14	Jules Suetens	1914	MF	1	
15	Georgy Hebdin	1919–20	FW	3	
16	Fernand Nisot	1920	FW	1	
17	Émile Hanse	1920–22	MF	4	
18	Joseph Musch	1921	DF/MF	3	
19	Oscar Verbeeck	1924	DF	1	
20	Florimond Vanhalme	1926–30	MF	14	
21	Pierre Braine	1928–30	MF	9	
22	Nic Hoydonckx	1930–33	DF	13	
23	Jacques Moeschal	1931	MF/FW	2	
24	Gust Hellemans	1932–34	CH	5	
25	Jules Lavigne	1932	DF	3	
26	Jules Pappaert	1934	DF	3	
27	Félix Welkenhuysen	1934	DF	1	
28	Philly Smellinckx	1935–38	DF	13	
29	Émile Stijnen	1936–39	MF	18	
30	Ray Braine	1938	FW	1	
31	Bob Paverick	1939–46	DF	9	
32	John Van Alphen	1944	DF/MF	1	
33	Nand Buyle	1945	FW	1	
34	Bert De Cleyn	1947	FW	5	
35	Marcel Vercammen	1947	MF	1	
36	Jules Henriet	1948–49	DF/MF	8	
37	François Daenen	1948–53	GK	3	
38	Freddy Chaves	1949–51	MF/FW	11	
39	Jef Mermans	1949–56	FW	30	
40	Henri Meert	1952–55	GK	4	
41	Victor Lemberechts	1953	FW	1	
42	Pol Anoul	1953	FW	2	
43	Louis Carré	1955–58	DF	5	
44	Vic Mees	1956–60	MF	16	
45	Marcel Dries	1958	DF	2	
46	Denis Houf	1958–61	FW	3	
47	Rik Coppens	1959	FW	4	
48	Henri Diricx	1960	DF	2	
49	Martin Lippens	1960–63	MF	3	
50	Jef Jurion	1960–67	MF	39	
51	Paul Van Himst	1964–74	FW	38	
52	Jean Nicolay	1965	GK	1	
53	Pierre Hanon	1966–68	DF/MF	6	
54	Georges Heylens	1968–70	DF	4	
55	Léon Semmeling	1970	FW	1	
56	Wilfried Van Moer	1975–82	DF/MF	10	
57	Christian Piot	1975–77	GK	8	
58	Maurice Martens	1976	DF	1	
59	Raoul Lambert	1977	FW	2	
60	Julien Cools	1977–80	DF/MF	20	
61	François Van der Elst	1980	FW	1	
62	Eric Gerets	1980–91	DF	26	
63	Walter Meeuws	1982–84	DF	2	
64	Jean-Marie Pfaff	1984–87	GK	3	
65	Ludo Coeck	1984	DF/MF	1	
66	Jan Ceulemans	1984–91	MF/FW	48	
67	René Vandereycken	1984	MF	1	
68	Georges Grün	1989–95	DF	25	
69	Franky Van der Elst	1992–98	MF	18	
70	Michel Preud'homme	1993–94	GK	3	
71	Enzo Scifo	1993–98	MF	11	
72	Lorenzo Staelens	1995–00	DF/MF	19	
73	Marc Degryse	1995–96	MF	3	
74	Nico Van Kerckhoven	1998	DF/MF	1	
75	Marc Wilmots	1999–02	MF	23	
76	Gert Verheyen	2001–02	MF/FW	3	
77	Bart Goor	2002–05	MF	20	
78	Eric Deflandre	2004	DF	2	
79	Timmy Simons	2004–09	DF/MF	36	
80	Émile Mpenza	2005	FW	1	
81	Daniel Van Buyten	2007–11	DF	10	
82	Thomas Vermaelen	2009–13	DF	14	
83	Vincent Kompany	2010–17	DF	36 (Note: Note that the friendlies against Romania on 14 November 2012 and against Luxembourg on 26 May 2014 are not FIFA-recognised due to an excessive number of substitutions.)	
84	Jan Vertonghen	2012–21	DF	13	
85	Eden Hazard	2015–22	MF/FW	45	
86	Axel Witsel	2016	MF	1	Active
87	Thibaut Courtois	2018	GK	1	Active
88	Kevin De Bruyne	2018–Present	MF	7	Active
89	Romelu Lukaku	2020–Present	FW	6	Active
90	Youri Tielemans	2022–Present	MF	5	Active
