= Belgian Golden Shoe =

Belgian football award

Gouden Schoen, Solier d'Or
- Icon version of the Golden shoe
- Date: 1954; 72 years ago
- Location: Belgium
- Presented by: Het Laatste Nieuws
- First award: 1954
- Current holder: (Switzerland) Ardon Jashari (1st award) (Belgium) Tessa Wullaert (6th award)

Highlights
- Most awards: (Belgium) Paul Van Himst (4 awards)
- Most nominations: (Belgium) Paul Van Himst (7 nominations)

In association football, the Belgian Golden Shoe (Dutch: Gouden Schoen, French: Soulier d'Or, German: Goldener Schuh) is an award given in Belgium at the beginning of each civil year to the best footballer of the Belgian Pro League for the past year. The trophy is sponsored by the Belgian newspaper Het Laatste Nieuws.

The voters are a selection of Belgian press specialists and football personalities. They are invited to vote for the best player of the competition for both half seasons (previous season second half and current season first half) and each get to submit a top three, scoring 3, 2 and 1 point respectively. As a result, a player can receive all of his votes in one half season (e.g. if he joined the championship from abroad during summer), or he can receive votes for matches with two (or more) different teams, as with Philippe Albert in 1992 and Mbark Boussoufa in 2006.

Paul Van Himst has collected 4 Belgian Golden Shoes which is the current record. Jan Ceulemans, Wilfried Van Moer and Hans Vanaken have won the trophy three times. The first foreigner to win the trophy was the Dutchman Johan Boskamp, especially for his excellence during the second half of the 1974–75 season, when his club, RWDM (currently defunct), won its first and only championship title. The only foreigners who have won the award more than once are the Swede Pär Zetterberg and the Moroccan Mbark Boussoufa. In 2011, Argentinian Matías Suárez became the first South American to be awarded the Golden Shoe.

From 2000, an award was also given to the best Belgian footballer abroad, although this award was not handed out in certain years, specifically from 2003 to 2007 and 2010 to 2011. Since 2013, the best coach, best goalkeeper, and best youngster awards have also been handed out. Finally, in 2016, Tessa Wullaert was awarded the first-ever Golden Shoe for women football players. Contrary to the men's award which is awarded to the best player in Belgium, the women's award goes to the best Belgian footballer, playing either in Belgium or abroad.

== Men ==
=== Golden Shoe ===
Year	Winner	Club(s)	Second	Club(s)	Third	Club(s)
1954	Rik Coppens (BEL)	Beerschot	Jef Mermans (BEL)	Anderlecht	Louis Carré (BEL)	RFC Liège
1955	Fons Van Brandt (BEL)	Lierse	Vic Mees (BEL)	Antwerp	Jef Mermans (BEL)	Anderlecht
1956	Vic Mees (BEL)	Antwerp	Denis Houf (BEL)	Standard Liège	Robert Van Kerkhoven (BEL)	Daring Club Bruxelles
1957	Jef Jurion (BEL)	Anderlecht	Louis Carré (BEL)	RFC Liège	Vic Mees (BEL)	Antwerp
1958	Roland Storme (BEL)	Gent	André Vanderstappen (BEL)	Olympic Charleroi	Denis Houf (BEL)	Standard Liège
1959	Lucien Olieslagers (BEL)	Lierse	Armand Seghers (BEL)	Olympic Charleroi	Rik Coppens (BEL)	Beerschot
1960	Paul Van Himst (BEL)	Anderlecht	Paul Bonga Bonga (COD)	Standard Liège	Eric Lambert (BEL)	Gent
1961	Paul Van Himst (BEL)	Anderlecht	Denis Houf (BEL)	Standard Liège	Pierre Hanon (BEL)	Anderlecht
1962	Jef Jurion (BEL)	Anderlecht	Jean Nicolay (BEL)	Standard Liège	Laurent Verbiest (BEL)	Anderlecht
1963	Jean Nicolay (BEL)	Standard Liège	Paul Van Himst (BEL)	Anderlecht	Frans Vermeyen (BEL)	Lierse
1964	Wilfried Puis (BEL)	Anderlecht	Paul Van Himst (BEL)	Anderlecht	Jean Nicolay (BEL)	Standard Liège
1965	Paul Van Himst (BEL)	Anderlecht	Wilfried Puis (BEL)	Anderlecht	Georges Heylens (BEL)	Anderlecht
1966	Wilfried Van Moer (BEL)	Antwerp	Raoul Lambert (BEL)	Club Brugge	Yves Baré (BEL)	RFC Liège
1967	Fernand Boone (BEL)	Club Brugge	Roger Claessen (BEL)	Standard Liège	Nico Dewalque (BEL)	Standard Liège
1968	Lon Polleunis (BEL)	Sint-Truiden	Léon Semmeling (BEL)	Standard Liège	Jean Dockx (BEL)	Racing White
1969	Wilfried Van Moer (BEL)	Standard Liège	Nico Dewalque (BEL)	Standard Liège	Jean Dockx (BEL)	Racing White
1970	Wilfried Van Moer (BEL)	Standard Liège	Christian Piot (BEL)	Standard Liège	Jean Dockx (BEL)	Racing White
1971	Erwin Vandendaele (BEL)	Club Brugge	Paul Van Himst (BEL)	Anderlecht	Christian Piot (BEL)	Standard Liège
1972	Christian Piot (BEL)	Standard Liège	Maurice Martens (BEL)	Racing White	Jean Thissen (BEL)	Standard Liège
1973	Maurice Martens (BEL)	Racing White	Nico Dewalque (BEL)	Standard Liège	Erwin Vandendaele (BEL)	Club Brugge
1974	Paul Van Himst (BEL)	Anderlecht	Christian Piot (BEL)	Standard Liège	Maurice Martens (BEL)	RWDM
1975	Johan Boskamp (NED)	RWDM	Rob Rensenbrink (NED)	Anderlecht	Raoul Lambert (BEL)	Club Brugge
1976	Rob Rensenbrink (NED)	Anderlecht	François Van der Elst (BEL)	Anderlecht	Raoul Lambert (BEL)	Club Brugge
1977	Julien Cools (BEL)	Club Brugge	Jean-Marie Pfaff (BEL)	Beveren	Rob Rensenbrink (NED)	Anderlecht
1978	Jean-Marie Pfaff (BEL)	Beveren	René Vandereycken (BEL)	Club Brugge	Rob Rensenbrink (NED)	Anderlecht
1979	Jean Janssens (BEL)	Beveren	Jan Ceulemans (BEL)	Club Brugge	Heinz Schönberger (GER)	Beveren
1980	Jan Ceulemans (BEL)	Club Brugge	Wilfried Van Moer (BEL)	Beringen	Erwin Vandenbergh (BEL)	Lierse
1981	Erwin Vandenbergh (BEL)	Lierse	Juan Lozano (ESP)	Anderlecht	Eric Gerets (BEL)	Standard Liège
1982	Eric Gerets (BEL)	Standard Liège	Ludo Coeck (BEL)	Anderlecht	Juan Lozano (ESP)	Anderlecht
1983	Franky Vercauteren (BEL)	Anderlecht	Heinz Schönberger (GER)	Beveren	Jan Ceulemans (BEL)	Club Brugge
1984	Enzo Scifo (BEL)	Anderlecht	Jan Ceulemans (BEL)	Club Brugge	Morten Olsen (DEN)	Anderlecht
1985	Jan Ceulemans (BEL)	Club Brugge	Philippe Desmet (BEL)	Waregem	René Vandereycken (BEL)	Anderlecht
1986	Jan Ceulemans (BEL)	Club Brugge	Juan Lozano (ESP)	Anderlecht	Gilbert Bodart (BEL)	Standard Liège
1987	Michel Preud'homme (BEL)	Mechelen	Frans van Rooy (NED)	Antwerp	Marc Degryse (BEL)	Club Brugge
1988	Lei Clijsters (BEL)	Mechelen	Marc Degryse (BEL)	Club Brugge	Marc Emmers (BEL)	Mechelen
1989	Michel Preud'homme (BEL)	Mechelen	Marc Emmers (BEL)	Mechelen	Marc Degryse (BEL)	Club Brugge; Anderlecht
1990	Franky Van der Elst (BEL)	Club Brugge	Luís Oliveira (BRA)	Anderlecht	Luc Nilis (BEL)	Anderlecht
1991	Marc Degryse (BEL)	Anderlecht	Philippe Albert (BEL)	Mechelen	Luc Nilis (BEL)	Anderlecht
1992	Philippe Albert (BEL)	Mechelen; Anderlecht	Dany Verlinden (BEL)	Club Brugge	Josip Weber (CRO)	Cercle Brugge
1993	Pär Zetterberg (SWE)	Anderlecht	Lorenzo Staelens (BEL)	Club Brugge	Josip Weber (BEL)	Cercle Brugge
1994	Gilles De Bilde (BEL)	Anderlecht	Franky Van der Elst (BEL)	Club Brugge	Paul Okon (AUS)	Club Brugge
1995	Paul Okon (AUS)	Club Brugge	Gilbert Bodart (BEL)	Standard Liège	Marc Degryse (BEL)	Anderlecht (England) Sheffield Wednesday
1996	Franky Van Der Elst (BEL)	Club Brugge	Pär Zetterberg (SWE)	Anderlecht	Philippe Vande Walle (BEL)	Germinal Ekeren
1997	Pär Zetterberg (SWE)	Anderlecht	Franky Van Der Elst (BEL)	Club Brugge	Eric Van Meir (BEL)	Lierse
1998	Branko Strupar (BEL)	Genk	Souleymane Oularé (GUI)	Genk	Lorenzo Staelens (BEL)	Club Brugge; Anderlecht
1999	Lorenzo Staelens (BEL)	Anderlecht	Jan Koller (CZE)	Lokeren; Anderlecht	Toni Brogno (BEL)	Westerlo
2000	Jan Koller (CZE)	Anderlecht	Yves Vanderhaeghe (BEL)	Mouscron; Anderlecht	Walter Baseggio (BEL)	Anderlecht
2001	Wesley Sonck (BEL)	Genk	Gert Verheyen (BEL)	Club Brugge	Walter Baseggio (BEL)	Anderlecht
2002	Timmy Simons (BEL)	Club Brugge	Wesley Sonck (BEL)	Genk	Danny Boffin (BEL)	Sint-Truiden
2003	Aruna Dindane (CIV)	Anderlecht	Walter Baseggio (BEL)	Anderlecht	Mbo Mpenza (BEL)	Mouscron
2004	Vincent Kompany (BEL)	Anderlecht	Luigi Pieroni (BEL)	Mouscron (France) Auxerre	Marius Mitu (ROM)	Lierse
2005	Sérgio Conceição (POR)	Standard Liège	Vincent Kompany (BEL)	Anderlecht	Christian Wilhelmsson (SWE)	Anderlecht
2006	Mbark Boussoufa (MAR)	Gent; Anderlecht	Mohammed Tchité (BDI)	Standard Liège; Anderlecht	Nicolás Frutos (ARG)	Anderlecht
2007	Steven Defour (BEL)	Standard Liège	Ahmed Hassan (EGY)	Anderlecht	Tom De Sutter (BEL)	Cercle Brugge
2008	Axel Witsel (BEL)	Standard Liège	Milan Jovanović (SRB)	Standard Liège	Marouane Fellaini (BEL)	Standard Liège (England) Everton
2009	Milan Jovanović (SRB)	Standard Liège	Mbark Boussoufa (MAR)	Anderlecht	Romelu Lukaku (BEL)	Anderlecht
2010	Mbark Boussoufa (MAR)	Anderlecht	Romelu Lukaku (BEL)	Anderlecht	Jelle Vossen (BEL)	Cercle Brugge; Genk
2011	Matías Suárez (ARG)	Anderlecht	Axel Witsel (BEL)	Standard Liège (Portugal) Benfica	Thibaut Courtois (BEL)	Genk (Spain) Atlético Madrid
2012	Dieumerci Mbokani (COD)	Anderlecht	Jelle Vossen (BEL)	Genk	Silvio Proto (BEL)	Anderlecht
2013	Thorgan Hazard (BEL)	Zulte Waregem	Maxime Lestienne (BEL)	Club Brugge	Silvio Proto (BEL)	Anderlecht
2014	Dennis Praet (BEL)	Anderlecht	Víctor Vázquez (ESP)	Club Brugge	Hans Vanaken (BEL)	Lokeren
2015	Sven Kums (BEL)	Gent	Laurent Depoitre (BEL)	Gent	Danijel Milićević (SUI)	Gent
2016	José Izquierdo (COL)	Club Brugge	Łukasz Teodorczyk (POL)	Anderlecht	Ruud Vormer (NED)	Club Brugge
2017	Ruud Vormer (NED)	Club Brugge	Youri Tielemans (BEL)	Anderlecht (France) Monaco	Leander Dendoncker (BEL)	Anderlecht
2018	Hans Vanaken (BEL)	Club Brugge	Mehdi Carcela (MAR)	Standard Liège	Alejandro Pozuelo (ESP)	Genk
2019	Hans Vanaken (BEL)	Club Brugge	Dieumerci Mbokani (COD)	Antwerp	Ruslan Malinovskyi (UKR)	Genk (Italy) Atalanta
2020	Lior Refaelov (ISR)	Antwerp	Raphael Holzhauser (AUT)	Beerschot	Paul Onuachu (NGA)	Genk
2021	Paul Onuachu (NGA)	Genk	Noa Lang (NED)	Club Brugge	Charles De Ketelaere (BEL)	Club Brugge
2022	Simon Mignolet (BEL)	Club Brugge	Casper Nielsen (DEN)	Union SG; Club Brugge	Mike Trésor (BEL)	Genk
2023	Toby Alderweireld (BEL)	Antwerp	Cameron Puertas (ESP)	Union SG	Mohamed Amoura (ALG)	Union SG
2024	Hans Vanaken (BEL)	Club Brugge	Cameron Puertas (ESP)	Union SG (Saudi Arabia) Al Qadsiah	Kasper Dolberg (DEN)	Anderlecht
2025	Ardon Jashari (SUI)	Club Brugge (Italy) AC Milan	Hans Vanaken (BEL)	Club Brugge	Christos Tzolis (GRE)	Club Brugge

=== Breakdown of winners ===
==== Multiple winners ====
Country	Number of wins	Number of second places	Number of third places
(Belgium) Paul Van Himst	4	3	0
(Belgium) Jan Ceulemans	3	2	1
(Belgium) Hans Vanaken	3	1	1
(Belgium) Wilfried Van Moer	3	1	0
(Belgium) Franky Van der Elst	2	2	0
(Morocco) Mbark Boussoufa	2	1	0
(Sweden) Pär Zetterberg	2	1	0
(Belgium) Jef Jurion	2	0	0
(Belgium) Michel Preud'homme	2	0	0

==== By nationality ====
Country	Number of wins	Winning years	Number of second places	Number of third places
Belgium	54	1954–1974, 1977–1992, 1994, 1996, 1998–1999, 2001–2002, 2004, 2007–2008, 2013–2015, 2018–2019, 2022–2024	49	54
Netherlands	3	1975–1976, 2017	3	3
Sweden	2	1993, 1997	1	1
Morocco	2	2006, 2010	2	0
Democratic Republic of the Congo	1	2012	2	0
Czech Republic	1	2000	1	0
Serbia	1	2009	1	0
Argentina	1	2011	0	1
Australia	1	1995	0	1
Nigeria	1	2021	0	1
Switzerland	1	2025	1	1
Ivory Coast	1	2003	0	0
Portugal	1	2005	0	0
Colombia	1	2016	0	0
Israel	1	2020	0	0
Spain	0		4	2
Denmark	0		1	2
Germany	0		1	1
Austria	0		1	0
Brazil	0		1	0
Burundi	0		1	0
Egypt	0		1	0
Guinea	0		1	0
Poland	0		1	0
Croatia	0		0	1
Romania	0		0	1
Algeria	0		0	1
Ukraine	0		0	1
Greece	0		0	1

=== Secondary awards ===
Year	Best Belgian Abroad		Best Coach		Best Goalkeeper		Best Youngster (U23)		Most beautiful goal	
Year	Winner	Club	Winner	Club	Winner	Club	Winner	Club	Winner (opponent)	Club
2000	Émile Mpenza (BEL)	(Germany) Schalke 04	not awarded		not awarded		not awarded		not awarded	
2001	Geert De Vlieger (BEL)	(Netherlands) Willem II	not awarded		not awarded		not awarded		not awarded	
2002	Marc Wilmots (BEL)	(Germany) Schalke 04	not awarded		not awarded		not awarded		not awarded	
2003	not awarded		not awarded		not awarded		not awarded		not awarded	
2004	not awarded		not awarded		not awarded		not awarded		not awarded	
2005	not awarded		not awarded		not awarded		not awarded		not awarded	
2006	not awarded		not awarded		not awarded		not awarded		Mohamed Tchité (BDI) vs. Brussels	Anderlecht
2007	not awarded		not awarded		not awarded		not awarded		Tom Soetaers (BEL) vs. Cercle Brugge	Genk
2008	Marouane Fellaini (BEL)	(England) Everton	not awarded		not awarded		not awarded		Silvio Proto (BEL) vs. Gent	Germinal Beerschot
2009	Thomas Vermaelen (BEL)	(England) Arsenal	not awarded		not awarded		not awarded		Bart Goor (BEL) vs. Standard Liège	Germinal Beerschot
2010	Vincent Kompany (BEL)	(England) Manchester City	not awarded		not awarded		not awarded		Wesley Sonck (BEL) vs. Genk	Lierse
2011	not awarded		not awarded		not awarded		not awarded		Benjamin De Ceulaer (BEL) vs. Club Brugge	Lokeren
2012	not awarded		not awarded		not awarded		not awarded		Dalibor Veselinović (SRB) vs. Gent	Kortrijk
2013	Thibaut Courtois (BEL)	(Spain) Atlético Madrid	Francky Dury (BEL)	Zulte Waregem	Silvio Proto (BEL)	Anderlecht	Thorgan Hazard (BEL)	Zulte Waregem	Jelle Vossen (BEL) vs. Kortrijk	Genk
2014	Thibaut Courtois (BEL)	(Spain) Atlético Madrid (England) Chelsea	Besnik Hasi (ALB)	Anderlecht	Mathew Ryan (AUS)	Club Brugge	Youri Tielemans (BEL)	Anderlecht	Víctor Vázquez (ESP) vs. Anderlecht	Club Brugge
2015	Kevin De Bruyne (BEL)	(Germany) Wolfsburg (England) Manchester City	Hein Vanhaezebrouck (BEL)	Gent	Matz Sels (BEL)	Gent	Youri Tielemans (BEL)	Anderlecht	Nicklas Pedersen (DEN) vs. Standard Liège	Gent
2016	Kevin De Bruyne (BEL)	(England) Manchester City	Michel Preud'homme (BEL)	Club Brugge	Ludovic Butelle (FRA)	Club Brugge	Leon Bailey (JAM)	Genk	Wilfred Ndidi (NGA) vs. Club Brugge	Genk
2017	Eden Hazard (BEL)	(England) Chelsea	Felice Mazzù (BEL)	Charleroi	Lovre Kalinić (CRO)	Gent	Henry Onyekuru (NGA)	Eupen; Anderlecht	Ivo Rodrigues (POR) vs. Oostende	Antwerp
2018	Eden Hazard (BEL)	(England) Chelsea	Ivan Leko (CRO)	Club Brugge	Lovre Kalinić (CRO)	Gent	Wesley Moraes (BRA)	Club Brugge	Siebe Schrijvers (BEL) vs. Antwerp	Club Brugge
2019	Eden Hazard (BEL)	(England) Chelsea (Spain) Real Madrid	Philippe Clement (BEL)	Genk; Club Brugge	Simon Mignolet (BEL)	Club Brugge	Yari Verschaeren (BEL)	Anderlecht	Clinton Mata (ANG) vs. Gent	Club Brugge
2020	Romelu Lukaku (BEL)	(Italy) Inter Milan	Philippe Clement (BEL)	Club Brugge	Simon Mignolet (BEL)	Club Brugge	Charles De Ketelaere (BEL)	Club Brugge	Hans Vanaken (BEL) vs. Anderlecht	Club Brugge
2021	Romelu Lukaku (BEL)	(Italy) Inter Milan (England) Chelsea	Felice Mazzù (BEL)	Union SG	Simon Mignolet (BEL)	Club Brugge	Charles De Ketelaere (BEL)	Club Brugge	Noa Lang (NED) vs. Waasland-Beveren	Club Brugge
2022	Kevin De Bruyne (BEL)	(England) Manchester City	Wouter Vrancken (BEL)	Mechelen; Genk	Simon Mignolet (BEL)	Club Brugge	Bilal El Khannous (MAR)	Genk	Bryan Heynen (BEL) vs. Antwerp	Genk
2023	Kevin De Bruyne (BEL)	(England) Manchester City	Mark van Bommel (NED)	Antwerp	Jean Butez (FRA)	Antwerp	Arthur Vermeeren (BEL)	Antwerp	Toby Alderweireld (BEL) vs. Genk	Antwerp
2024	Charles De Ketelaere (BEL)	(Italy) Atalanta	Nicky Hayen (BEL)	Club Brugge	Simon Mignolet (BEL)	Club Brugge	Bilal El Khannous (MAR)	Genk (England) Leicester City	Luka Vušković (CRO) vs. Club Brugge	Westerlo
2025	Romelu Lukaku (BEL)	(Italy) Napoli	Sébastien Pocognoli (BEL)	Union SG	Colin Coosemans (BEL)	Anderlecht	Nathan De Cat (BEL)	Anderlecht	Christos Tzolis (GRE) vs. Dender EH	Club Brugge

== Golden Shoe of the 20th Century ==
The Golden Shoe of the Century is a football trophy awarded by the Royal Belgian Football Association in 1995. The award was presented in honor of the 100th anniversary of the RBFA. Paul Van Himst, who also won the Golden Shoe four times during his football career, was awarded the trophy. He is considered the best Belgian player of the 20th century.

Rank	Winner	Points
1	Paul Van Himst	1403
2	Jan Ceulemans	1130
3	Wilfried Van Moer	896
4	Rik Coppens	676
5	Michel Preud'homme	460
6	Jean-Marie Pfaff	404
7	Raymond Braine	324
8	Eric Gerets	322
9	Jef Mermans	298
10	Ludo Coeck	228

== Women ==
While the men's golden shoe award goes to the best player in the Belgian league, irrespective of his nationality, the women's award is targeted at the best Belgian female player, either in Belgium or abroad.

Year	Winner	Club(s)	Second	Club(s)	Third	Club(s)
2016	Tessa Wullaert (BEL)	(Germany) Wolfsburg	Janice Cayman (BEL)	(France) Montpellier	Aline Zeler (BEL)	Standard Liège
2017	Janice Cayman (BEL)	(France) Montpellier	Tessa Wullaert (BEL)	(Germany) Wolfsburg	Davina Philtjens (BEL)	(Netherlands) Ajax
2018	Tessa Wullaert (BEL)	(Germany) Wolfsburg (England) Manchester City	Janice Cayman (BEL)	(France) Montpellier	Davina Philtjens (BEL)	(Netherlands) Ajax (Italy) Fiorentina
2019	Tessa Wullaert (BEL)	(England) Manchester City	Janice Cayman (BEL)	(France) Lyon	Tine De Caigny (BEL)	Anderlecht
2020	Tine De Caigny (BEL)	Anderlecht	Tessa Wullaert (BEL)	(England) Manchester City; Anderlecht	Kassandra Missipo (BEL)	Gent; Anderlecht
2021	Janice Cayman (BEL)	(France) Lyon	Tessa Wullaert (BEL)	Anderlecht	Tine De Caigny (BEL)	Anderlecht (Germany) Hoffenheim
2022	Nicky Evrard (BEL)	Gent; OH Leuven	Tessa Wullaert (BEL)	Anderlecht (Netherlands) Fortuna Sittard	Sari Kees (BEL)	OH Leuven
2023	Tessa Wullaert (BEL)	(Netherlands) Fortuna Sittard	Marie Detruyer (BEL)	OH Leuven	Janice Cayman (BEL)	(France) Lyon (England) Leicester City
2024	Tessa Wullaert (BEL)	(Netherlands) Fortuna Sittard (Italy) Inter Milan	Marie Detruyer (BEL)	OH Leuven (Italy) Inter Milan	Sari Kees (BEL)	OH Leuven (England) Leicester City
2025	Tessa Wullaert (BEL)	(Italy) Inter Milan	Mariam Toloba (BEL)	Standard Liège (France) Nantes	Hannah Eurlings (BEL)	OH Leuven (Germany) Union Berlin
