= Fernand Boone =

Belgian footballer

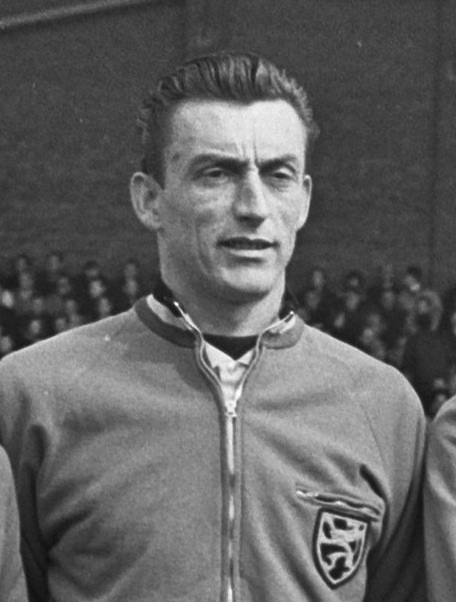
- Boone in 1968

Personal information
- Date of birth: 1 August 1934
- Date of death: 11 October 2013 (aged 79)
- Place of death: Ghent, Belgium
- Position: Goalkeeper

Youth career
- –1959: Club Brugge

Senior career*
| Years | Team | Apps | (Gls) |
| 1959–1971 | Club Brugge | 278 | (0) |
| 1971–1972 | K.S.V. Roeselare | | (0) |

International career
| 1968–1969 | Belgium | 8 | (0) |
- * Club domestic league appearances and goals

Fernand Boone (1 August 1934 – 11 September 2013) was a Belgian football goalkeeper who won the Belgian Golden Shoe in 1967 while at Club Brugge. He played 8 times for the national team between 1967 and 1968, starting in a 1-0 friendly win against the Netherlands on 16 April 1967. He was considered as the substitute for the Standard Liège goalkeeper Jean Nicolay for the national team.
