= Verbiest =

Verbiest or Verbist is a Flemish surname. Notable people with the surname include:

- Ferdinand Verbiest, Flemish Jesuit missionary in China
- Theophiel Verbist, Belgian priest who founded in 1862 the Congregation of Scheutveld
- Laurent Verbiest, Belgian soccer player

== See also ==
- 2545 Verbiest
