= Armand Seghers =

Belgian footballer (1926–2005)

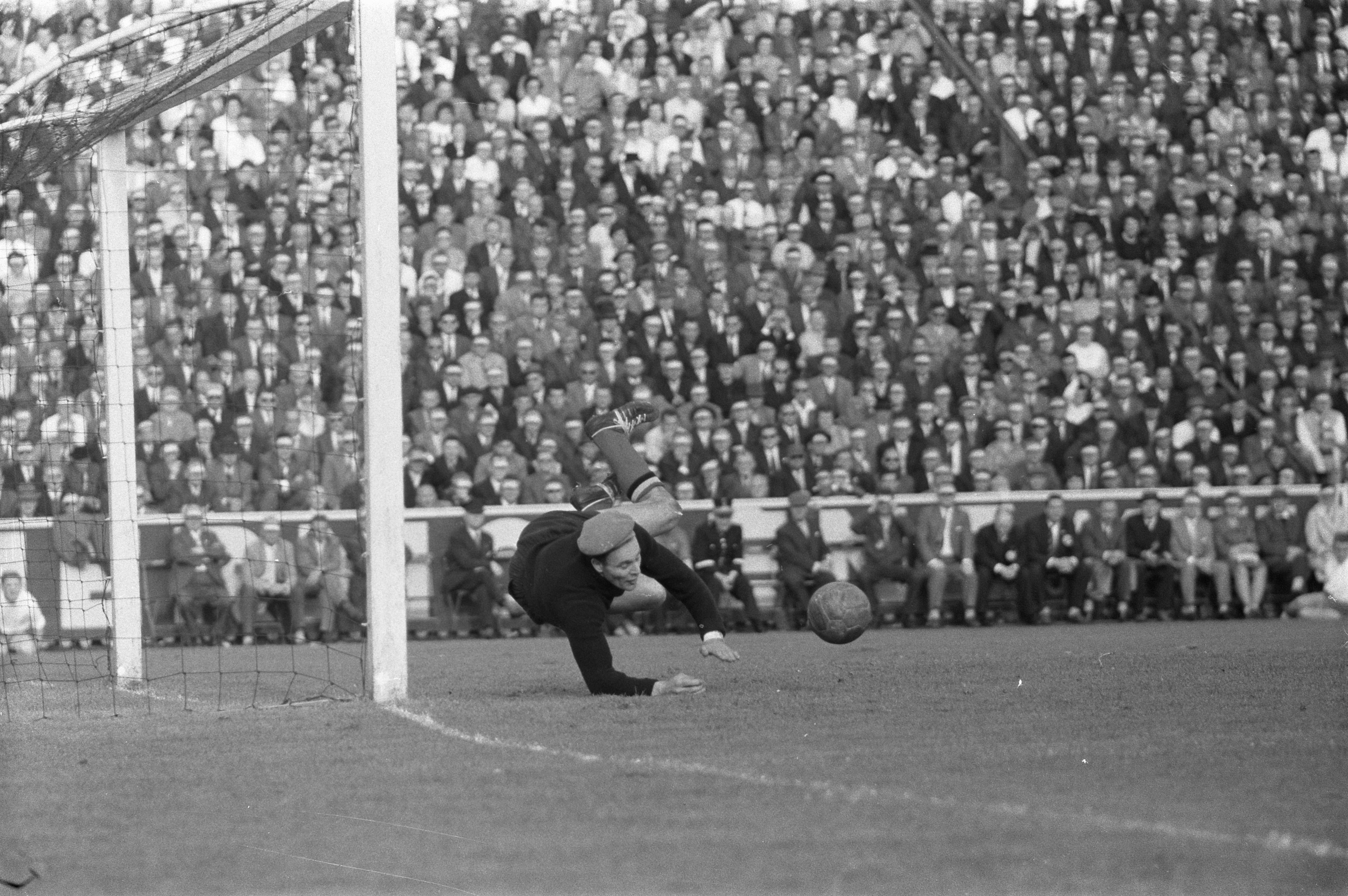
- Seghers in 1960

Personal information
- Date of birth: 21 June 1926
- Place of birth: Zelzate, Belgium
- Date of death: 15 March 2005 (aged 78)
- Place of death: Zelzate, Belgium
- Position: Goalkeeper

Senior career*
Years	Team	Apps	(Gls)
- SLV-Zelzate
- Gent

International career
1951–1960	Belgium	11	(0)
- * Club domestic league appearances and goals

Armand Seghers (21 June 1926 – 15 March 2005), nicknamed Mance Seghers, was a Belgian footballer who played as a goalkeeper for AA Gent, then called AA La Gantoise.

== Club career ==
Seghers was born in Zelzate. He started in 1942 as a keeper at SLV Zelzate (Sint-Laurens Voetbalclub Zelzate), which merged in 2008 with FC Zelzate, hereafter called KVV Zelzate. In 1949, he was discovered by AA La Gantoise. He played 485 games in competition for 'the Gantoise', as AA Gent was called in that time, played 18 cup games and 4 European games. During 12 seasons he played all the games, of which the first 158 without interruption.

In 1959, he failed by one point to tie with Lucien Olieslagers of Lierse to win the Golden Shoe, the prize for the best player in the league.

In 1964, Seghers won the Cup with AA Gent. Thanks to this performance, he played in the Europe League (then called Europe Cup of Cup Winners). In May 1966, he finished his active playing career.

His trademark was his hat, which he always wore during every match. Every time he jumped, he lost his "klakke", as it is called in Dutch dialect, which provoked hilarity among the supporters.

== International career ==
Between 1951 and 1960, Seghers was selected 20 times for the national team. In those 20 selections, he finally had 11 real performances as national keeper of the Rode Duivels. At the celebration of the centenary of AA Gent, he was elected "Buffalo of the century".

The game on 25 December 1952 in Paris against France was his first cap. He made a good debut, as the Red Devils won 1–0, also thanks to his saves, one of which was a penalty. This gave him his nickname the hero of Colombes.

== Death and legacy ==
On 15 March 2005, Seghers died at the age of 78 in his native town of Zelzate, after a lingering illness. His funeral service took place on 19 March 2005.

One of his sons became a pharmacist and the other a neurologist-psychiatrist.

The town council of Zelzate honoured him on 18 November 2003 as honorary citizen, because of his contribution to local sport. In 2013, a street in the town was named after him.
