= Lucien Olieslagers =

Belgian footballer (1936–2021)

- Olieslagers receiving the Golden Shoe in 1959

Personal information
- Full name: Lucien Olieslagers
- Date of birth: 25 November 1936
- Place of birth: Vorselaar, Belgium
- Date of death: 21 May 2021 (aged 84)
- Place of death: Vorselaar, Belgium
- Position: Defender

Senior career*
Years	Team	Apps	(Gls)
1958–1969	Lierse	282	(55)
1969–1971	KV Mechelen		
- * Club domestic league appearances and goals

Lucien Olieslagers (25 November 1936 – 29 May 2021) was a Belgian footballer who played as a midfielder. He won the Belgian Golden Shoe in 1959 while at Lierse. Despite also becoming Belgian champion that season, he was never called up for the Belgian national team.

== Death ==
Olieslagers died on 29 May 2021, at the age of 84.

== Honours ==
Lierse SK

- Belgian First Division: 1959–60
- Belgian Cup: 1968–69

Individual

- Belgian Golden Shoe: 1959
