= Vincent Kompany =

Belgian football manager and player (born 1986)

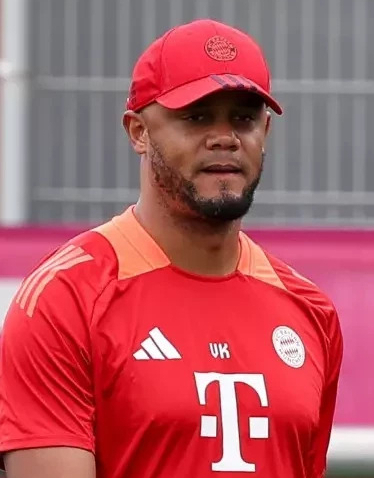
- Kompany managing Bayern Munich in 2024

Personal information
- Full name: Vincent Jean Mpoy Kompany
- Date of birth: 10 April 1986 (age 40)
- Place of birth: Uccle, Brussels, Belgium
- Height: 1.92 m (6 ft 4 in)
- Position: Centre-back

Team information
- Current team: Bayern Munich (head coach)

Youth career
- 2000–2003: Anderlecht

Senior career*
Years	Team	Apps	(Gls)
2003–2006	Anderlecht	73	(5)
2006–2008	Hamburger SV	29	(1)
2008–2019	Manchester City	265	(18)
2019–2020	Anderlecht	15	(1)
Total		382	(25)

International career
2002	Belgium U16	3	(0)
2002	Belgium U17	2	(0)
2004–2019	Belgium	89	(4)

Managerial career
- 2019: Anderlecht
- 2020–2022: Anderlecht
- 2022–2024: Burnley
- 2024–: Bayern Munich
Medal record
Men's football
Representing Belgium
FIFA World Cup
Third place	2018 Russia
- * Club domestic league appearances and goals

Vincent Jean Mpoy Kompany (French pronunciation: [vɛ̃sɑ̃ kɔ̃pani]; born 10 April 1986) is a Belgian professional football manager and former player who is the head coach of Bundesliga club Bayern Munich. In his career as a player, in which he played as a centre-back, Kompany is best known for his eleven seasons at Manchester City, eight of which he served as captain. He also represented the Belgium national team for fifteen years and served as its captain.

Kompany began his professional career at Anderlecht; having graduated from their youth system, he was with the club for three seasons as a first-team player before moving to Bundesliga club Hamburg in 2006. In the summer of 2008, he completed a transfer to Premier League club Manchester City, where he was an integral part of the squad and regarded as one of the bargain buys of the revolutionised City era, blossoming into one of the league's best centre-backs. In the 2011–12 season, he was awarded the captaincy of City, leading his club to win the Premier League that season, their first league title in 44 years. Kompany was included in the Premier League Team of the Year in 2011, 2012, and 2014, and won the Premier League Player of the Season in 2012. Kompany won eleven more trophies at City and made 360 total appearances.

Kompany earned 89 caps for Belgium in a 15-year international career, having made his debut in 2004 at age 17. He was part of their squad that came fourth at the 2008 Olympics and went to the FIFA World Cup in 2014 and 2018, coming a best-ever third at the latter. He served as captain from 2010.

In 2019, when his contract expired after eleven years at City, Kompany returned to Anderlecht as player-manager. A year later, he announced his retirement from professional football and became the first-team manager. In 2022, he was hired by Burnley. There, he won the EFL Championship in his first season, but relegated from the Premier League the following season. He was appointed by Bayern Munich in 2024 following the departure of Thomas Tuchel and won the 2024–25 Bundesliga in his first season at the club, followed by a domestic treble in his second season.

== Club career ==
=== Anderlecht ===
Born in Uccle, Brussels, Kompany started his career at Anderlecht at the age of 17. He made his professional debut on 30 July 2003 in a UEFA Champions League second qualifying round first leg away to Rapid București, starting in a goalless draw. His first goal on 1 February 2004 came in a 3–1 win away to Sint-Truiden.

Kompany won several awards including the Belgian Golden Shoe and the Belgian Ebony Shoe. Although several top European sides immediately showed interest, the player and his entourage decided to first develop a few more years at Anderlecht. "Don't you worry, I will stay here," he told Berend Scholten at UEFA.com. "At the moment the zeros in my contract are not so important. If I wanted to leave, I would have been gone already." In November 2003, still under contract until 2006, he agreed to extend his deal for two more years upon his 18th birthday in April 2004.

In late 2003, Kompany was a target for Manchester United manager Alex Ferguson to cover the long-term suspension of defender Rio Ferdinand. Ferguson attended Anderlecht's trip to Celtic in the Champions League group stage so that he could watch Kompany, but was instead impressed by Celtic midfielder Liam Miller and signed him. Additionally, Kompany's mother would not let him transfer until he had finished his education.

=== Hamburg ===
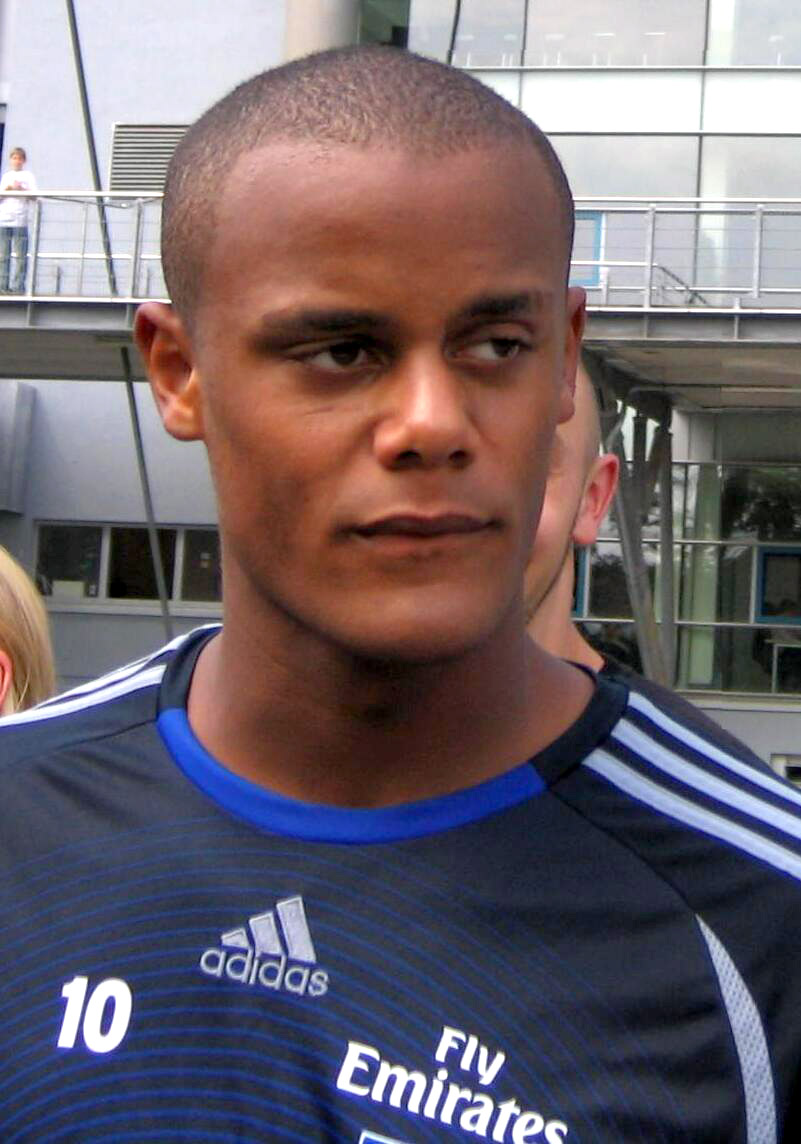
Kompany with Hamburg in 2006

On 9 June 2006 it was announced that Kompany had been acquired by Hamburger SV for a fee of €10 million, as a replacement for fellow Belgian Daniel Van Buyten. In his debut season for Hamburg, he managed only six Bundesliga starts for the club before suffering an achilles injury in November that ruled him out for the rest of the season. Despite his lack of involvement in the season, he was selected in a 30-man provisional squad for the 2007 UEFA European Under-21 Football Championship.

Kompany scored on 29 July 2007 in a 4–0 win (5–1 aggregate) over Moldova's Dacia Chișinău in the last round of the UEFA Intertoto Cup. Hamburg won the title via being the Intertoto team that advanced furthest in the 2007–08 UEFA Cup.

In August 2008, Kompany fell out with Hamburg over his decision to play at the Olympic tournament in China. After leaving the club, he criticised chairman Bernd Hoffmann as "one of those people who know about money, but don't know anything about football". Kompany speculated that the club's lack of success in the past 20 years despite its large supporter base could not be attributed to the players alone.

=== Manchester City ===
==== 2008–11 ====
On 22 August 2008, Premier League club Manchester City signed Kompany from Hamburg on a four-year contract for an undisclosed fee. He made his debut two days later in a 3–0 home win against West Ham United, playing the entire match. On 28 September, Kompany scored his first goal in City's 2–1 away defeat by Wigan Athletic. During his early time at Manchester City, Kompany played as a defensive midfielder.

On 19 October 2009, Kompany signed a new five-year deal with City that would keep him at the club until 2014. He scored his second league goal for the club in a 2–0 home win against Portsmouth and his third in a 6–1 win against Burnley at Turf Moor.

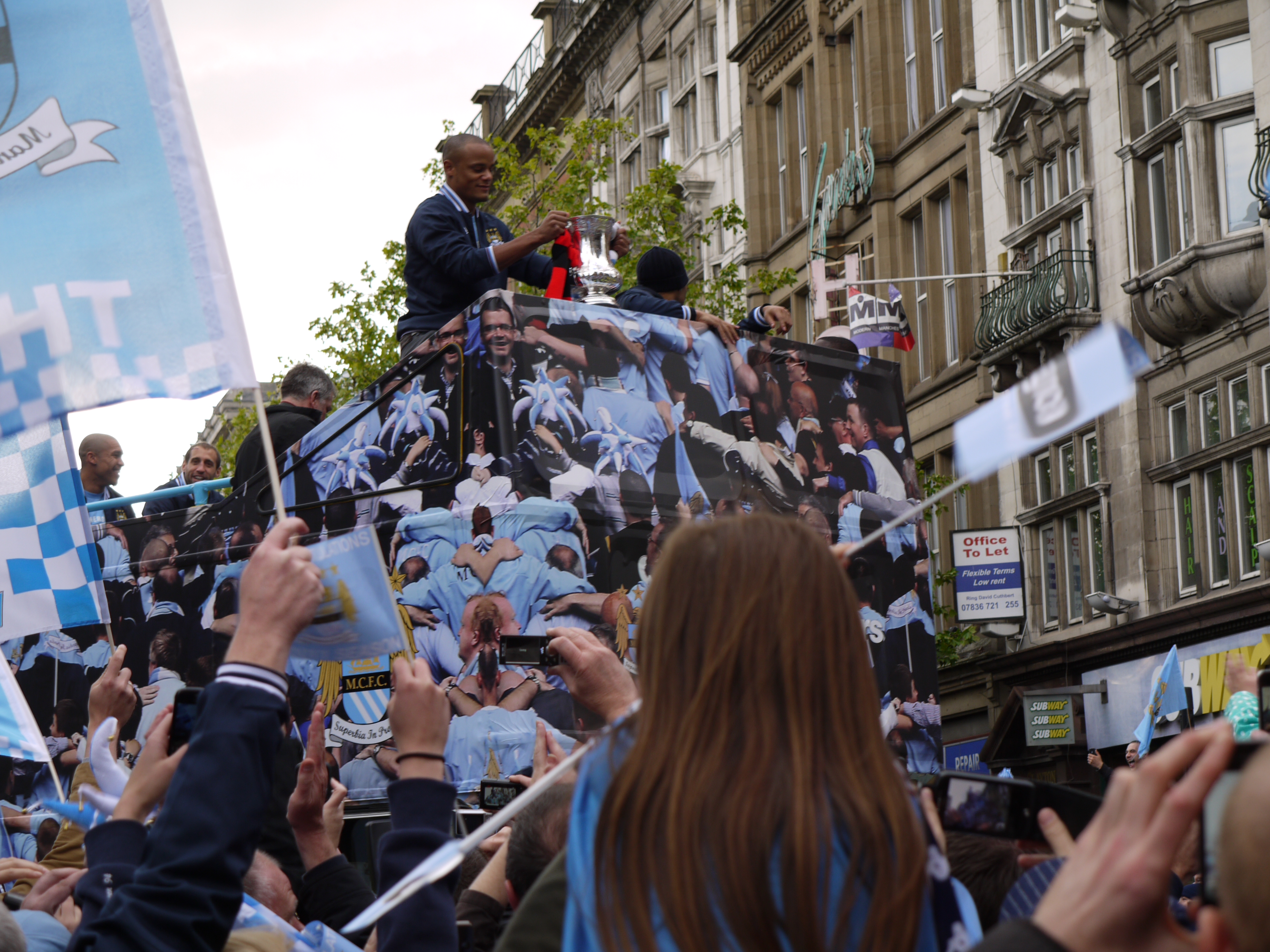
Kompany holding the FA Cup during Manchester City's 2011 victory parade

Kompany was handed the number 4 jersey for the 2010–11 season after previous wearer Nedum Onuoha moved on loan to Sunderland. On 25 April, Kompany again continued to captain the side in the absence of striker Carlos Tevez against Blackburn Rovers at Ewood Park, playing the full 90 minutes alongside Lescott in a 1–0 victory. On 16 April, Kompany captained Manchester City's victory over main rivals Manchester United in the FA Cup semi-final at Wembley; City won the game 1–0. Later that day, he was named in the PFA Team of the Year alongside teammate Tevez.

In the 2011 FA Cup Final, Kompany started and finished the match, a 1–0 victory over Stoke City, which delivered Manchester City's first major trophy for 35 years. At the end of the 2010–11 season, in which City qualified for the UEFA Champions League for the first time, manager Roberto Mancini praised Kompany as "incredible", and called him one of the top defenders in Europe, with the potential to be number one in the world.

He finished the season winning the club's Supporters' Player of the Year and Players' Player of the Year awards, clocking up 50 appearances in all competitions including 37 Premier League starts.

==== 2011–14 ====
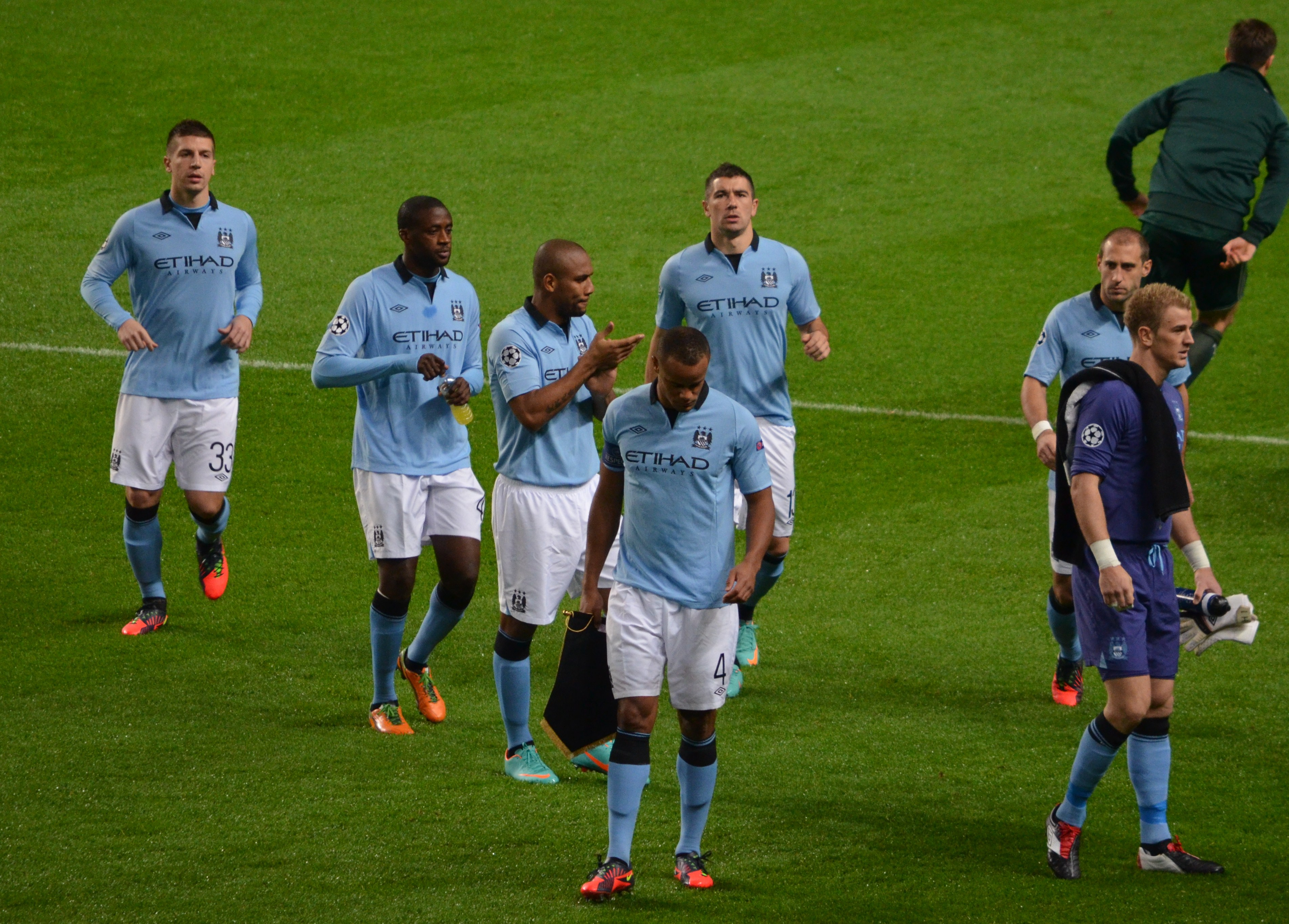
Kompany (centre) captaining City against Real Madrid in 2012

Kompany was firmly installed as club captain for the 2011–12 season, with Tevez having expressed publicly his desire to leave the club. The opening fixture on 7 August 2011 was the Community Shield, which ended in a 3–2 defeat to rivals Manchester United despite City holding a two-goal lead at half-time.

On 30 April 2012, Kompany scored with a header from a David Silva corner in the Manchester derby; the game finished 1–0 to City and put them in first place ahead of Manchester United on goal difference with only two games of the season remaining. On 11 May 2012, Kompany was named Barclays Player of the Season for his outstanding performance in the Premier League, the first time the award was won by a City player.

On 13 May, the final day of the Premier League season, Kompany led the team against Queens Park Rangers which ended in a dramatic 3–2 win, securing the league title for the club for the first time since 1968. QPR midfielder Joey Barton attempted to headbutt Kompany during the match. On 25 July, Kompany signed a six-year contract with Manchester City, the longest of its kind in the club's history.

After winning the curtain-raising Community Shield 3–2 against Chelsea (Kompany lifting the trophy at the unfamiliar venue of Villa Park), the 2012–13 season was something of a disappointment for the club as they finished bottom of their Champions League group, placed second in the league (but far behind winners Manchester United) and lost the FA Cup Final 1–0 to Wigan Athletic. Kompany played in that final, but had missed part of the league campaign due to injury, with Mancini citing his absence as a major factor in the failure to retain the title.

On 2 March 2014, Kompany captained the Manchester City team that won the League Cup Final, beating Sunderland 3–1. On 11 May, he scored Manchester City's second goal in a 2–0 win against West Ham United as the club won the 2013–14 Premier League title.

==== 2014–19 ====
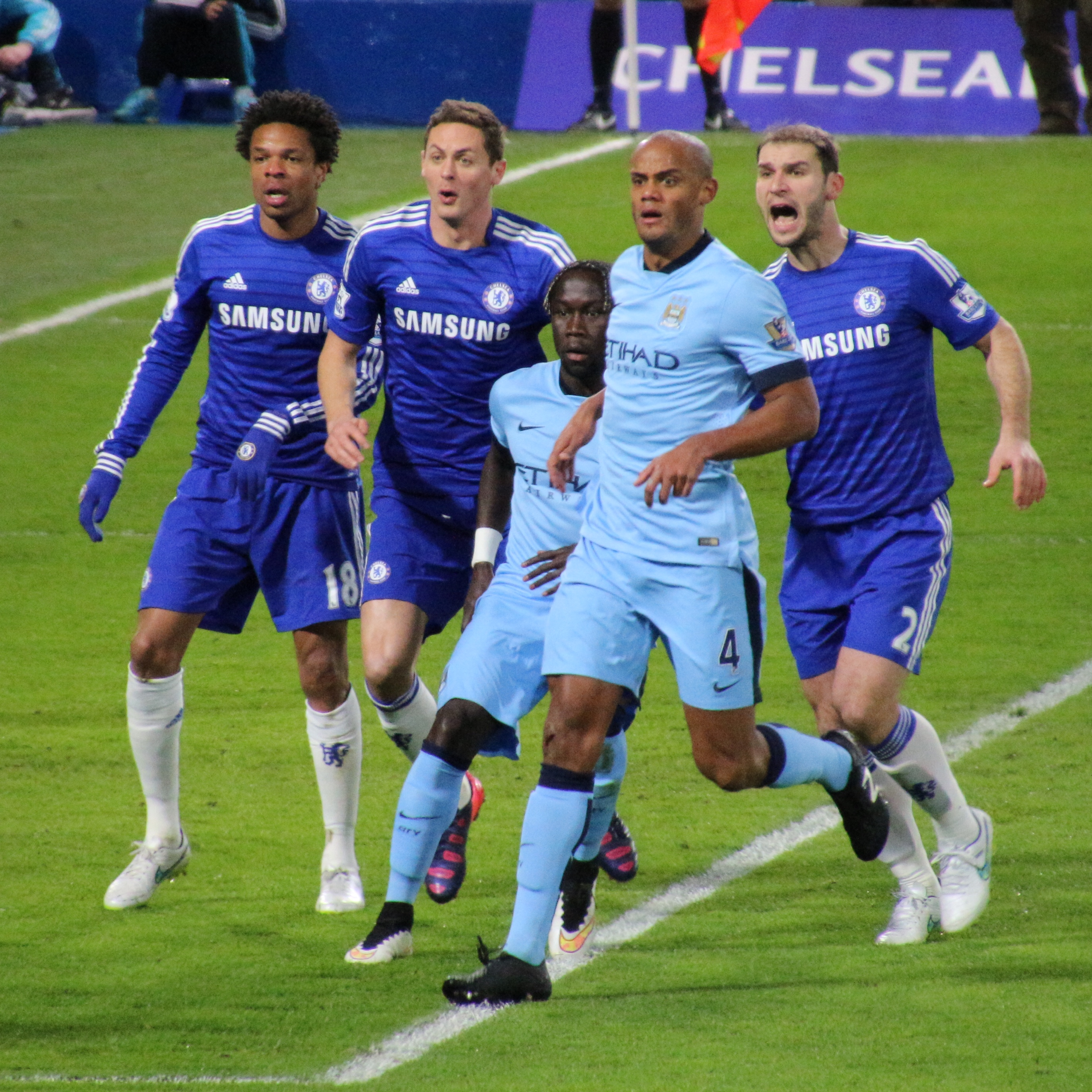
Kompany playing for City against Chelsea, 2015

During 2014–15, Kompany accumulated 33 appearances in all competitions, but the club could only finish runners-up in the league and were eliminated from the domestic and continental cups at early stages, also losing out in the Community Shield. In April 2015, he suffered a muscular injury during the Manchester derby which ended his campaign early, and this would prove to be the start of a long spell of recurring injuries (mainly muscular strains) for a player who had already endured a number of physical problems since his arrival in England.

After scoring in the team's opening two Premier League fixtures, Kompany suffered a strain to his calf in the opening weeks of the 2015–16 season and lasted just minutes into his comeback match in December. in February 2016, he was fit to take part in the League Cup Final in which City defeated Liverpool, and was named man of the match; however in May he was again forced off in the early stages of the Champions League semi-final, finishing with 22 appearances and subsequently missing Euro 2016 with Belgium.

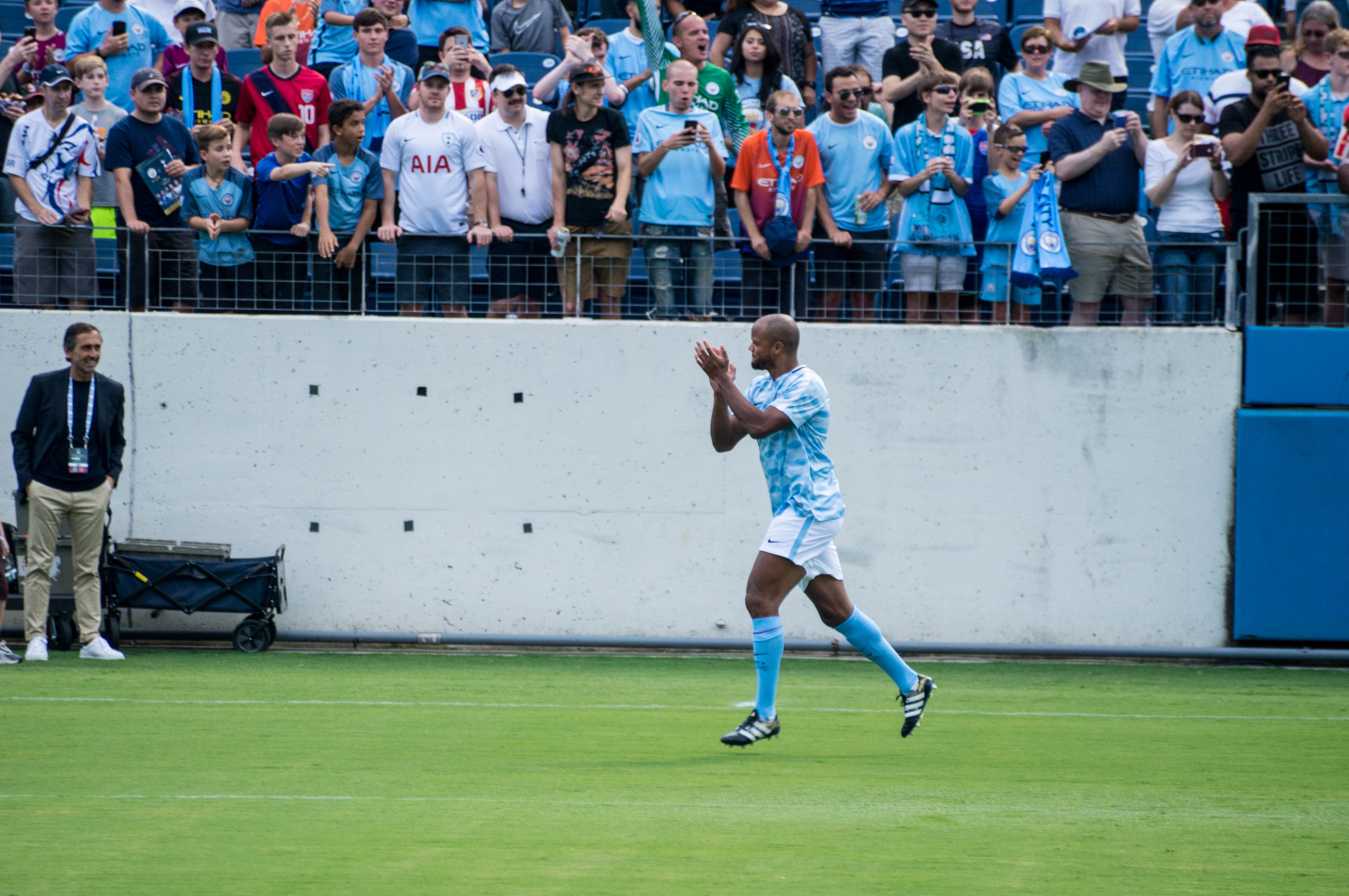
Kompany training with City, 2017

Having returned to the first team in October 2016, on 9 November Kompany withdrew from international duty with discomfort, and on 22 November he sustained a knee injury. At that time, an analysis showed that he had suffered 37 injuries since joining Manchester City in 2008 and had missed over two years (878 days) in that eight-year period. By April 2017, he had recovered, and scored in a victory over Tottenham Hotspur, commenting on his issues that "The main thing is self-belief and experience". Manager Pep Guardiola kept Kompany in the team for the FA Cup semi-final, and he played the entirety of the match which went to extra time; City lost the tie to eventual winners Arsenal, finishing 2016–17 without a trophy. Kompany appeared just 15 times during the campaign, although his continued importance to the team was evidenced by the fact he would always return to the starting line-up as soon as he was fit.

Kompany played in eight league matches for Manchester City during the first portion of 2017–18, suffering further strains during the period, before withdrawing minutes into an away fixture against Newcastle on 27 December; Guardiola's responses in the press conferences suggested he was losing patience with the situation. He returned to the team on 3 February 2018, completing the 90 minutes of a 1–1 draw away to Burnley while Aymeric Laporte, the club's new record signing in the same position, remained on the bench throughout. On 25 February, he scored Manchester City's second goal of a 3–0 victory over Arsenal in the 2018 EFL Cup Final, and was named man of the match. he eventually managed 17 league starts as Manchester City won the title with a record 100 points.

On 6 May 2019, Kompany scored Manchester City's only goal during a 1–0 victory over Leicester City with his first goal from outside the box for the club. The result put the club one point ahead at the top of the 2018–19 Premier League table, and they retained the title by the same margin six days later. Kompany had already lifted the EFL Cup again in February 2019 after a penalty shootout victory over Chelsea. He played the whole of the 2019 FA Cup Final, a 6–0 victory over Watford, as the club completed an unprecedented domestic treble (plus the Community Shield).

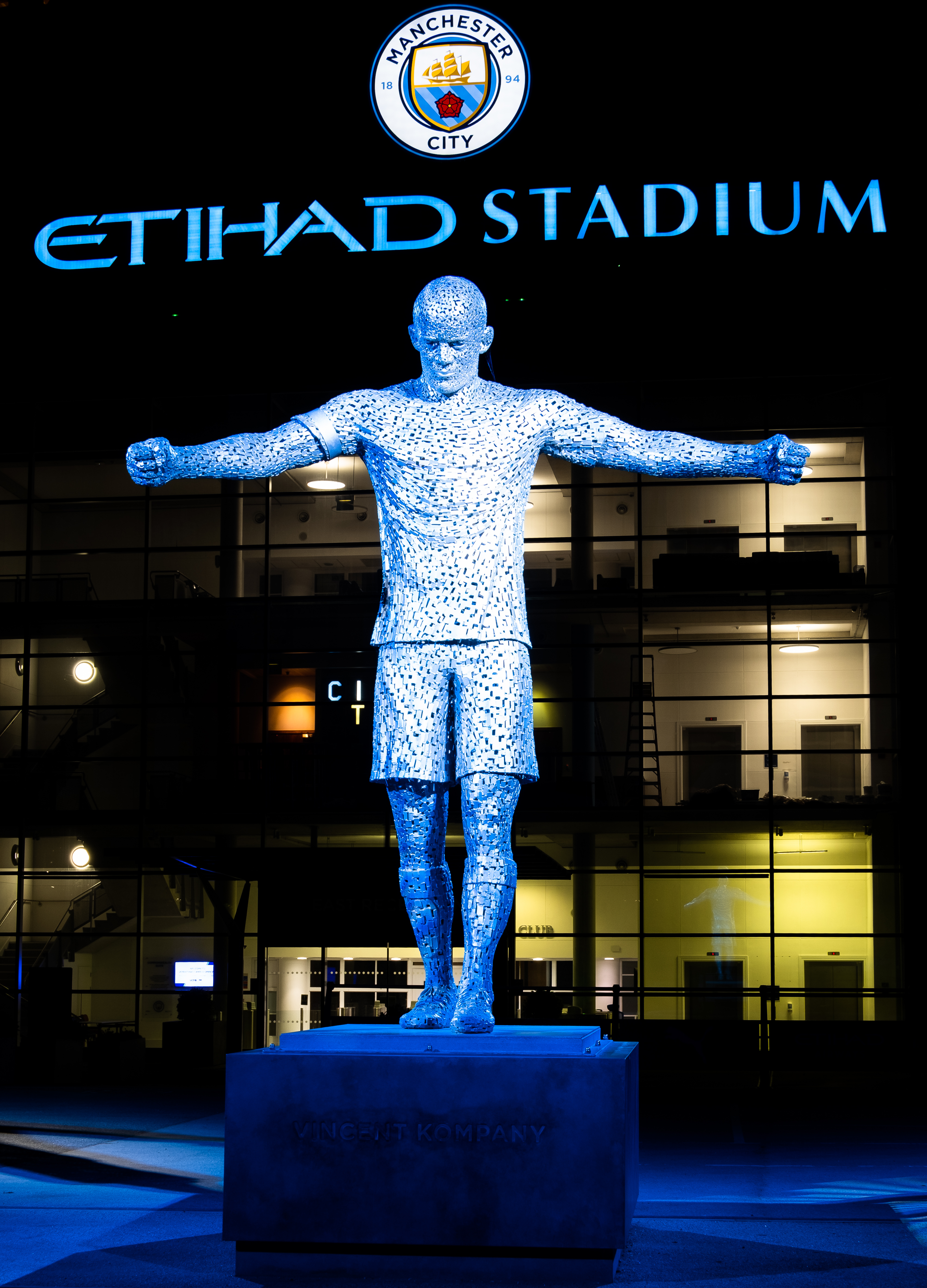
Statue of Kompany outside of the Etihad Stadium

On 17 August 2020, Manchester City chairman Khaldoon Al Mubarak announced plans for a statue of Kompany at the Etihad Stadium, along with teammates Sergio Aguero and David Silva, to commemorate his "transformational" contribution at City. The statues of Kompany and Silva were unveiled on 28 August 2021.

=== Return to Anderlecht ===
On 19 May 2019, it was announced that Kompany would be leaving Manchester City to become player-manager of his first club Anderlecht. With two defeats, two goalless draws, six goals conceded and three scored, the Brussels-based club had endured their worst opening start to a league campaign since the 1998–99 season. On 22 August, Kompany decided to step down from managerial duties on the pitch, to focus primarily on being a player. Head coach Simon Davies would be placed in charge of tactical changes and substitutions, while Kompany would be given the captain's armband.

== International career ==
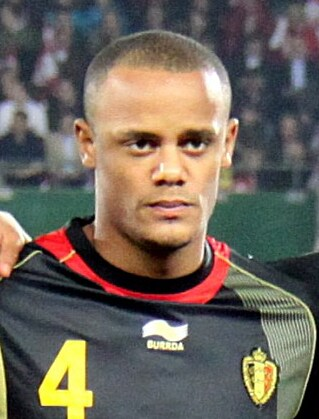
Kompany playing for Belgium against Austria, 2011

Kompany made his international debut for Belgium at the age of 17 on 18 February 2004, starting in a 2–0 home loss to France.

Kompany went to the Olympic football tournament in China in 2008, after his club Hamburg finally authorised his absence. In Belgium's opening game, he and Marouane Fellaini were sent off in a 1–0 loss to Brazil. Hamburg demanded that he return to Germany for the start of the Bundesliga season. He did not take the flight back, allegedly due to a lost passport, and Hamburg demanded that FIFA take action against the Royal Belgian Football Association. Kompany and Fellaini eventually did leave the tournament for their clubs in Europe.

In November 2009, Kompany fell out with the Belgium manager Dick Advocaat. Before the friendly match with Qatar, Kompany received permission to attend his grandmother's funeral as long as he returned to the team hotel before 6 pm that evening. He did not return until nearly midnight and Advocaat removed him from the squad altogether, although on 24 February 2010, he was recalled for the friendly against Croatia.

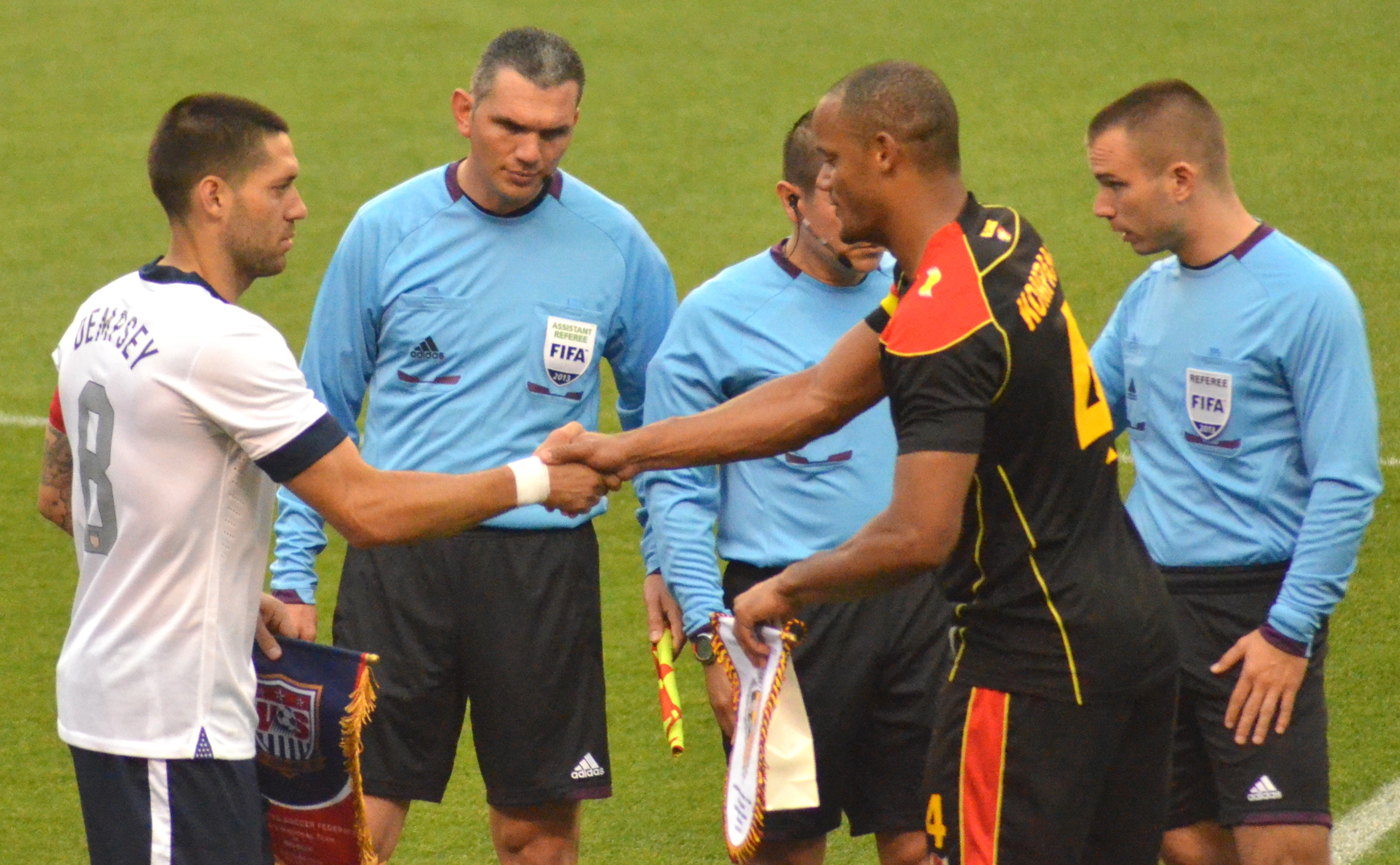
Belgian captain Kompany swaps pennants with United States skipper Clint Dempsey in 2013

On 19 May 2010, Kompany captained Belgium for the first time and scored his first international goal in the 90th minute for a 2–1 friendly win over Bulgaria at the King Baudouin Stadium. After 34 minutes of Belgium's 2–1 World Cup qualifier win against Serbia in June 2013, Kompany suffered concussion and facial injuries, including a broken nose and cracked eye-socket, in a collision with goalkeeper Vladimir Stojković. After receiving first aid on the touchline, he played out the remainder of the match.

On 13 May 2014, Kompany was named in the Belgium squad for the 2014 FIFA World Cup. He captained the Red Devils in their first World Cup match in 12 years, a 2–1 win against Algeria in Belo Horizonte. Injuries sustained during the season caused him to miss UEFA Euro 2016.

At the 2018 FIFA World Cup in Russia, Kompany featured in five of his nation's seven matches, playing every minute in the knockout phase as they advanced to the semi-finals before losing to eventual champions France, overcoming England to finish third, their highest ever placing in the competition.

== Style of play ==
Kompany was described as one of the most outstanding defenders in football, and in the history of the Premier League; he was recognised to be a strong centre back, with good aerial ability, mobility, and leadership qualities, as well as good technique and distribution. He was also an accurate tackler, with strong positional sense, and good at reading the game and anticipating his opponents.

Kompany initially played as a central or defensive midfielder before being moved to a centre-back role. Despite his ability, he often struggled with injuries throughout his career.

== Managerial career ==
=== Anderlecht ===
On 17 August 2020, it was announced that Kompany would be the head coach at Anderlecht for the next four seasons, after retiring from professional football on the same day. He made his debut six days later in a 1–1 home draw with Mouscron, conceding the equaliser in added time. In the Belgian Cup, the team reached the semi-finals before a 2–1 elimination by Genk in March. The league campaign ended with qualification for the play-offs, in which they came fourth and made the UEFA Europa Conference League.

In August 2021, Kompany's Violets were eliminated from the Conference League qualifiers 5–4 on aggregate by Dutch club Vitesse. The team did one round better in the cup than before, losing the final on penalties to Gent on 18 April, and came third in the league.

=== Burnley ===
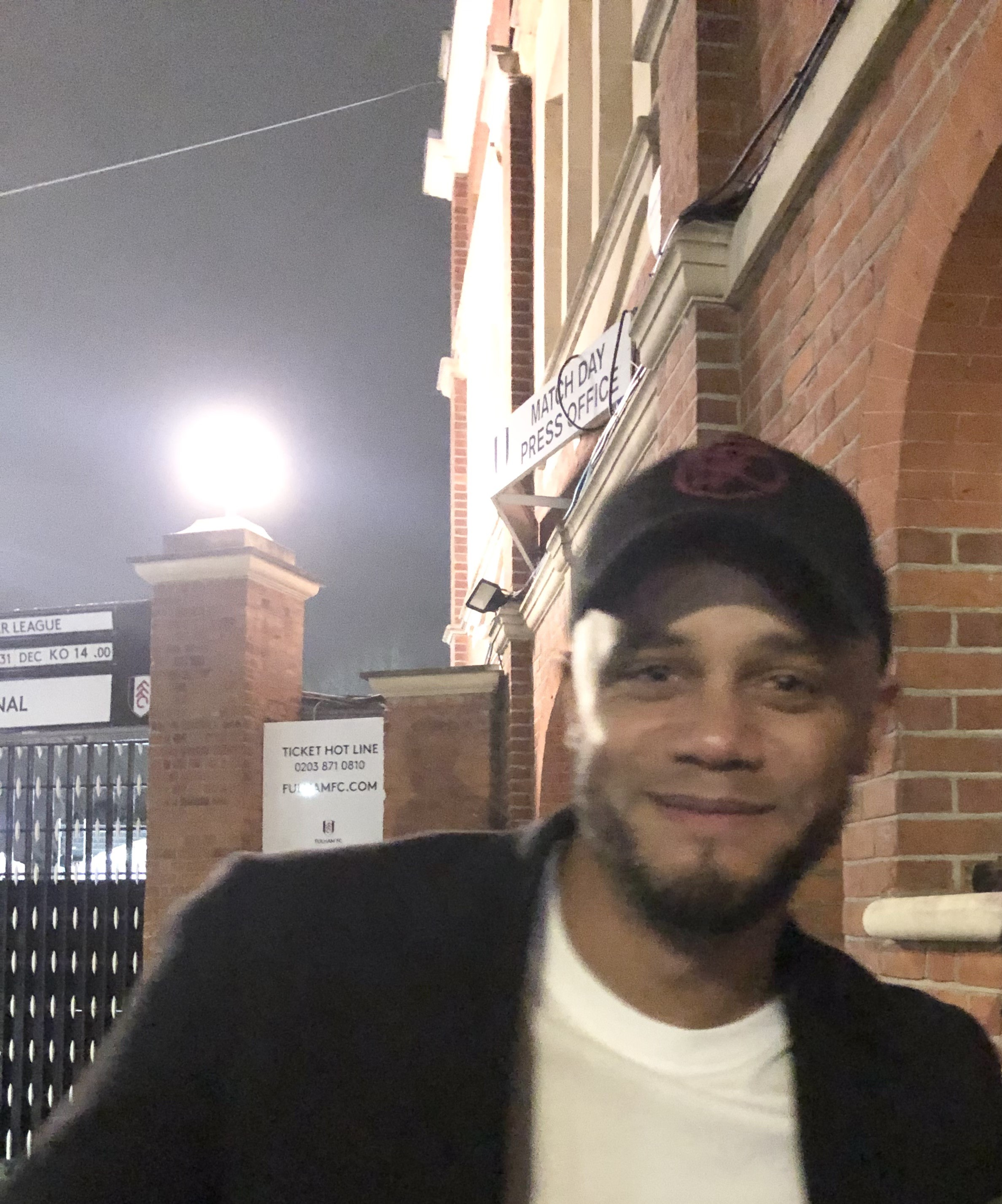
Kompany with Burnley in 2023

==== 2022–23: Championship title ====
On 14 June 2022, Kompany was appointed manager of EFL Championship club Burnley on a deal of undisclosed length, following the club's relegation from the Premier League. On his debut on 29 July, he won 1–0 at Huddersfield Town with a goal by debutant Ian Maatsen. An impressive October, where his side picked up five wins and three draws in an unbeaten month, saw Kompany awarded the EFL Championship Manager of the Month award, finishing the month on top of the table. He won the award for a second time for December, a 100% record ensuring that Burnley finished the calendar year top of the league. He won the award for a second consecutive perfect month, finishing the month 17 points clear of third place. Kompany also won the Manager of the Month award for February 2023 after having gained 14 points from six matches.

Burnley secured promotion to the Premier League, with seven matches left, after a 2–1 away win over Middlesbrough on 7 April 2023. On 23 April, Kompany was named Championship manager of the season. His side then beat Blackburn Rovers on 25 April to win the division title. He signed a new contract on 7 May 2023, tying him to Burnley until 2028. On the next day, Burnley won 3–0 against Cardiff City to finish the season with 101 points; hence, they managed to win their final matchday for the first time after six seasons and to be the first club to break the 100-point barrier since Leicester City in 2013–14, with only three defeats in 46 matches.

==== 2023–24: Premier League relegation ====
On Kompany's debut as a Premier League manager on 11 August 2023, his side lost 3–0 at home to reigning champions Manchester City. Will Unwin of The Guardian wrote that the performance "showed more than enough that Kompany and his players will be in the Premier League for the long term".

On 23 December 2023, Burnley won 2–0 against Fulham and moved out of the relegation zone. The match was the first in the Premier League where a woman was the referee. Kompany said "I am happy to be part of this moment".

On 30 March 2024, Kompany was sent off for protesting against referee Darren England when he awarded Chelsea a penalty and sent off Lorenz Assignon for fouling Mykhailo Mudryk. He was later charged with misconduct by the FA, receiving a touchline ban and a fine.

At the end of the season, Burnley were relegated from the Premier League, finishing 19th with a club record low tally of 24 points. The Athletic stated that already early in the season "Kompany's tactical naivety, stubbornness and inexperience" were highlighted. Kompany was also criticised for mainly buying inexperienced players, resulting in an uncompetitive squad. The Independent ranked it as "one of the Premier League's worst-ever relegations", partly due to the club having been "naive in the transfer market, naive on the pitch and, by extension, naive in the boardroom".

=== Bayern Munich ===
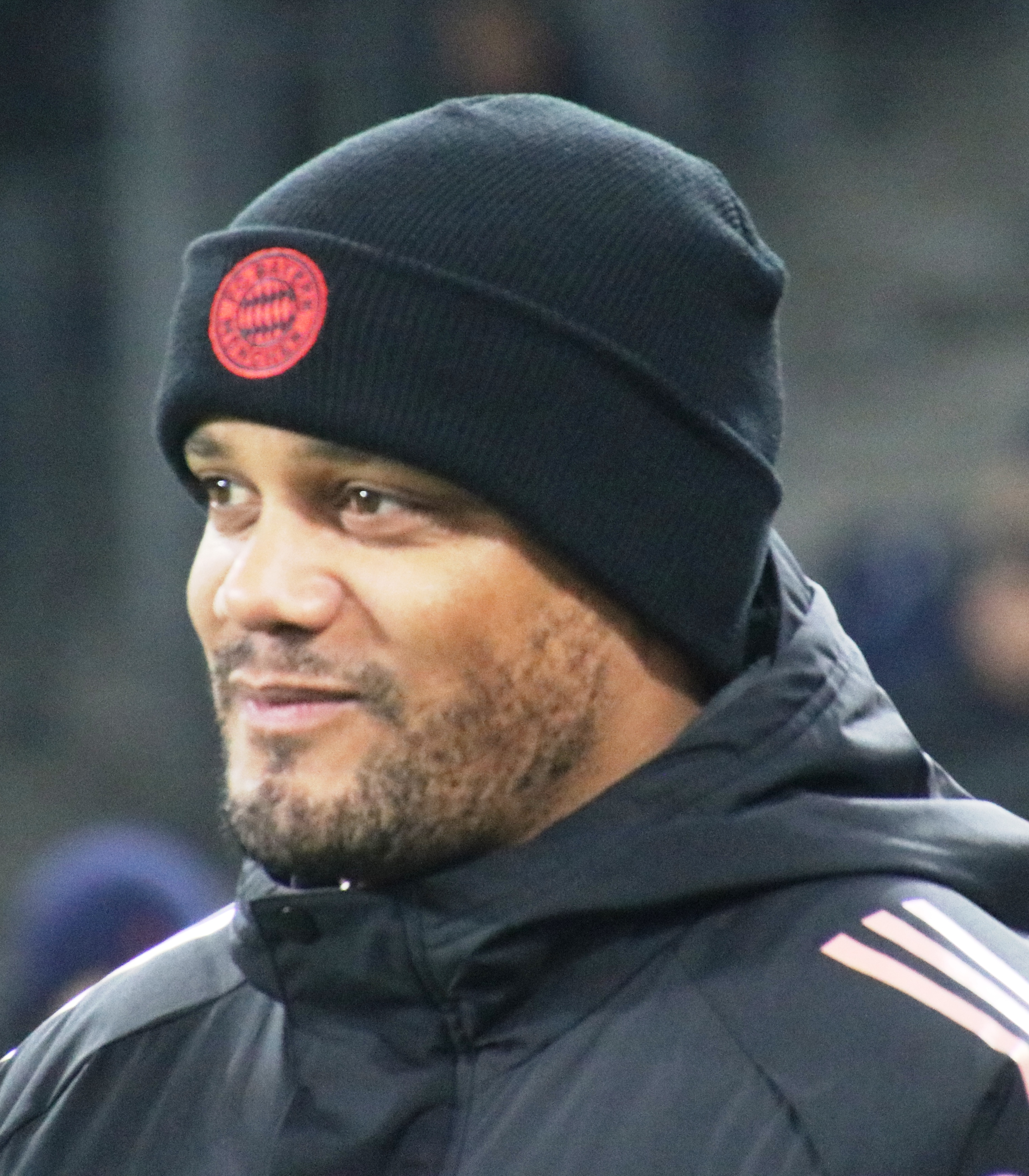
Kompany managing Bayern Munich in 2025

On 29 May 2024, Kompany was appointed as the new head coach of Bundesliga club Bayern Munich, signing a three-year deal. Burnley received a reported £10.2 million in compensation for the remainder of his contract, which made Kompany one of the most expensive managers in history. Bayern had won no trophies in the preceding season and were unable to get Thomas Tuchel to renew as manager, as well as missing out on candidates such as Xabi Alonso, Julian Nagelsmann and Oliver Glasner.

Kompany's debut on 16 August 2024 was a 4–0 win away to 2. Bundesliga team SSV Ulm 1846 in the first round of the DFB-Pokal. Nine days later, his Bundesliga debut as a manager was a 3–2 win at VfL Wolfsburg. In mid-September, prior to their annual visit to Oktoberfest, his team scored 20 goals over three games – two away wins in the domestic league and a 9–2 Champions League victory over Dinamo Zagreb, becoming the first ever manager of a team to score more than eight goals in a Champions League match.

On 4 May 2025, Bayern were confirmed as 2024–25 Bundesliga champions, having lost only twice in their 34 league matches. Later that year, on 21 October, Bayern Munich announced that Kompany has signed a new contract extension that will keep him at the club until 30 June 2029.

In the 2025–26 season, Kompany led Bayern Munich to a domestic clean-sweep; they kicked this off by beating VFB Stuttgart in the 2025 Super Cup. Kompany then guided Bayern to their second consecutive Bundesliga title where they scored a league-record 122 goals; he also became only the fourth coach after Pep Guardiola, Hansi Flick and Ernst Happel to win the competition in each of his first two seasons at the club. The only blot of the season was their being knocked out in the Champions League semi-finals by the defending champions Paris Saint-Germain. The season though ended in style, coincidentally as it began, with a 3–0 victory over defending champions VFB Stuttgart in the DFB Pokal final, marking the first time Bayern had won the trophy in six years.

== Managerial style ==
Adrian Clarke of the Premier League official website and Thom Harris of The Athletic wrote in 2023 that Kompany had a passing and possession-based style of football similar to his former Manchester City manager Pep Guardiola, and greatly different to the direct and physical football of former Burnley manager Sean Dyche.

== Charity work ==
Kompany is an official FIFA ambassador for registered charity SOS Children. Of Congolese heritage, Kompany represents his father's native Congo, and has invested and engaged in projects which aim to provide an education and safe living accommodation for children living in poverty.

In March 2013, Kompany bought the Belgian third division club Bleid as a "social commitment towards the youngsters of Brussels", with the intention of offering disadvantaged youngsters the opportunity to use sport as a vehicle for self-improvement.

== Personal life ==
Kompany's father, Pierre, is a Congolese immigrant to Belgium and serves as his agent. He had been interned as a student for rebelling against Mobutu Sese Seko, the dictator of Zaire. In October 2018, Pierre was elected the mayor of Ganshoren, making him the first black mayor in Belgium. His mother, Jocelyne, was Belgian and Kompany described her as a "socialist, borderline communist". The Kompany family faced racism. At age 14, he was expelled from school due to his frequent absences playing for the Belgium youth team, and also dropped from the team for clashing with the coach. He then faced further setbacks with his parents' divorce and eviction from his home. Kompany said in 2019 that due to widespread drugs and gangs in his local area, he could have chosen an "extremely wrong path" at this age.

His brother, François Kompany, spent most of his career in the Belgian second tier, having earlier been on the books of Macclesfield Town. Kompany also has an older sister. Among his friends are former Chelsea goalkeeper Yves Ma-Kalambay and former Manchester United defender Floribert N'Galula, both of whom he consulted about his move to England before joining Manchester City. When Kompany was 20, his mother and sister underwent cancer treatment. His mother died and his sister survived.

Kompany married his Mancunian girlfriend, Carla Higgs, a lifelong Manchester City supporter, on 11 June 2011 and together they have a daughter born in 2010, and two sons, born in 2013 and 2015.

Kompany has an interest in politics and graduated with an MBA at Manchester Business School in 2018 after several years of study. Kompany has been characterised as "erudite" and "eloquent". He was raised speaking French at home and learned Dutch at school due to the multilingual nature of Brussels. During the course of his football career, he learned and has since spoken fluent German and English, as well as intermediate levels of Italian and Spanish.

In April 2014, Kompany opened two new sports bars in Belgium called Good Kompany, one at the Grand-Place in Brussels and the other at the Groenplaats in Antwerp. However, he closed down both bars within a year of their opening. At the time of their closure, he said: "I regret this decision. We had enough customers, turnover was good, but not enough to cover the costs. So that's where it ends. Lesson 1 in business: investments are always a risk. You win some, you lose some."

== Career statistics ==
=== Club ===
Appearances and goals by club, season and competition
Club	Season	League			National cup (Note: Includes Belgian Cup, DFB-Pokal, FA Cup)		League cup (Note: Includes DFL-Ligapokal, Football League/EFL Cup)		Europe		Other		Total	
Club	Season	Division	Apps	Goals	Apps	Goals	Apps	Goals	Apps	Goals	Apps	Goals	Apps	Goals
Anderlecht	2003–04	Belgian First Division	29	2	5	0	—		9 (Note: Appearances in UEFA Champions League)	0	1 (Note: Appearance in Belgian Super Cup)	0	44	2
Anderlecht	2004–05	Belgian First Division	32	2	1	0	—		7	0	—		40	2
Anderlecht	2005–06	Belgian First Division	12	1	1	0	—		6	1	—		19	2
Anderlecht	Total		73	5	7	0	—		22	1	1	0	103	6
Hamburger SV	2006–07	Bundesliga	6	0	0	0	2	1	5	0	—		13	1
Hamburger SV	2007–08	Bundesliga	22	1	4	0	—		11 (Note: Two appearances and one goal in UEFA Intertoto Cup, nine appearances and one goal in UEFA Cup)	2	—		37	3
Hamburger SV	2008–09	Bundesliga	1	0	0	0	—		—		—		1	0
Hamburger SV	Total		29	1	4	0	2	1	16	2	—		51	4
Manchester City	2008–09	Premier League	34	1	1	0	1	0	9 (Note: Appearances in UEFA Cup)	0	—		45	1
Manchester City	2009–10	Premier League	25	2	3	0	4	0	—		—		32	2
Manchester City	2010–11	Premier League	37	0	5	0	0	0	8 (Note: Appearances in UEFA Europa League)	0	—		50	0
Manchester City	2011–12	Premier League	31	3	1	0	0	0	9 (Note: Six appearances in UEFA Champions League, three appearances in UEFA Europa League)	0	1 (Note: Appearance in FA Community Shield)	0	42	3
Manchester City	2012–13	Premier League	26	1	4	0	0	0	6	0	1	0	37	1
Manchester City	2013–14	Premier League	28	4	2	0	3	0	4	1	—		37	5
Manchester City	2014–15	Premier League	25	0	1	0	0	0	7	0	0	0	33	0
Manchester City	2015–16	Premier League	14	2	0	0	1	0	7	0	—		22	2
Manchester City	2016–17	Premier League	11	3	2	0	2	0	0	0	—		15	3
Manchester City	2017–18	Premier League	17	1	1	0	1	1	2	0	—		21	2
Manchester City	2018–19	Premier League	17	1	1	0	3	0	4	0	1	0	26	1
Manchester City	Total		265	18	21	0	15	1	56	1	3	0	360	20
Anderlecht	2019–20	Belgian First Division A	15	1	3	0	—		—		—		18	1
Career total			382	25	35	0	17	2	94	4	4	0	532	31

=== International ===
Appearances and goals by national team and year
National team	Year	Apps	Goals
Belgium	2004	8	0
Belgium	2005	6	0
Belgium	2006	2	0
Belgium	2007	5	0
Belgium	2008	6	0
Belgium	2009	2	0
Belgium	2010	7	1
Belgium	2011	10	1
Belgium	2012	6	2
Belgium	2013	4	0
Belgium	2014	11	0
Belgium	2015	5	0
Belgium	2016	0	0
Belgium	2017	3	0
Belgium	2018	12	0
Belgium	2019	2	0
Total		89	4

Belgium score listed first, score column indicates score after each Kompany goal

International goals by date, venue, cap, opponent, score, result and competition
No.	Date	Venue	Cap	Opponent	Score	Result	Competition
1	19 May 2010	King Baudouin Stadium, Brussels, Belgium	31	Bulgaria	2–1	2–1	Friendly
2	7 October 2011	King Baudouin Stadium, Brussels, Belgium	43	Kazakhstan	3–0	4–1	UEFA Euro 2012 qualifying
3	7 September 2012	Cardiff City Stadium, Cardiff, Wales	48	Wales	1–0	2–0	2014 FIFA World Cup qualification
4	16 October 2012	King Baudouin Stadium, Brussels, Belgium	51	Scotland	2–0	2–0	2014 FIFA World Cup qualification

== Managerial statistics ==
As of match played 20 November 2026

Managerial record by team and tenure
Team	From	To	Record				
Team	From	To	P	W	D	L	Win %
Anderlecht	1 July 2019	22 August 2019	4	0	2	2	0.00
Anderlecht	17 August 2020	1 June 2022	92	42	32	18	45.65
Burnley	14 June 2022	29 May 2024	96	41	24	31	42.71
Bayern Munich (Note: Soccerbase's total includes five matches he missed due to health reasons between 25 October and 7 November 2026: a win against SC Freiburg on 25 October, a win against 1. FC Magdeburg on 28 October, a draw against Borussia Dortmund on 31 October 2026, a win against Atlético Madrid on 3 November and a win against Mainz 05 on 7 November.)	29 May 2024	Present	123	91	20	12	73.98
Total			315	174	78	63	55.24

== Honours ==
=== Player ===
Anderlecht

- Belgian First Division: 2003–04, 2005–06

Hamburger SV

- UEFA Intertoto Cup: 2007

Manchester City

- Premier League: 2011–12, 2013–14, 2017–18, 2018–19
- FA Cup: 2010–11, 2018–19; runner-up: 2012–13
- Football League/EFL Cup: 2013–14, 2015–16, 2017–18, 2018–19
- FA Community Shield: 2012, 2018

Belgium

- FIFA World Cup third place: 2018

Individual

- Man of the Season (Belgian First Division): 2003–04, 2004–05
- Belgian Golden Shoe: 2004
- Belgian Young Professional Footballer of the Year: 2004, 2005
- Belgian Professional Footballer of the Year: 2004–05
- Belgian Ebony Shoe: 2004, 2005
- Best Belgian Player Abroad: 2010
- The Best Golden Shoe Team: 2011
- Manchester City Official Supporter's Player of the Year: 2010–11
- Manchester City Player's Player of the Year: 2010–11
- Premier League Player of the Season: 2011–12
- PFA Team of the Year: 2010–11 Premier League, 2011–12 Premier League, 2013–14 Premier League
- ESM Team of the Year: 2011–12
- Alan Hardaker Trophy: 2016, 2018
- Manchester City Goal of the Season: 2018–19
- BBC Goal of the Season: 2018–19
- Sports Illustrated Premier League Team of the Decade: 2010–2019
- RBFA 125 Years Icons Team: 2020
- FWA Tribute Award: 2020
- IFFHS All-time Belgium Men's Dream Team
- Premier League Hall of Fame: 2022
- Belgian Pro League Hall of Fame: 2024

=== Manager ===
Burnley

- EFL Championship: 2022–23

Bayern Munich

- Bundesliga: 2024–25, 2025–26
- DFB-Pokal: 2025–26
- Franz Beckenbauer Supercup: 2025, 2026

Individual

- EFL Championship Manager of the Month: October 2022, December 2022, January 2023, February 2023
- EFL Championship Manager of the Season: 2022–23
- LMA Championship Manager of the Year: 2022–23
- Belgian Sports Manager of the Year: 2025
- Raymond Goethals Trophy: 2025
- VDV Coach of the Season (Silver Bench): 2025–26
- German Football Manager of the Year: 2026
- Bavarian Minister-President's Award: 2026
