= André Vanderstappen =

Belgian footballer (1934–2005)

Personal information
- Date of birth: 27 March 1934
- Date of death: 14 June 2005 (aged 71)
- Position: Goalkeeper

Senior career*
| Years | Team | Apps | (Gls) |
| 1953–1960 | Olympic Club de Charleroi | | |
| 1960–1965 | Union SG | | |

International career
| 1957–1959 | Belgium | 10 | (0) |
- * Club domestic league appearances and goals

André Vanderstappen (27 March 1934 – 14 June 2005) was a Belgian footballer who played as a goalkeeper. He made ten appearances for the Belgium national team from 1957 to 1959.

== Honours ==
Union Saint-Gilliose

- Second Division: 1963-64
