= Victor Mees =

Belgian footballer (1927–2012)

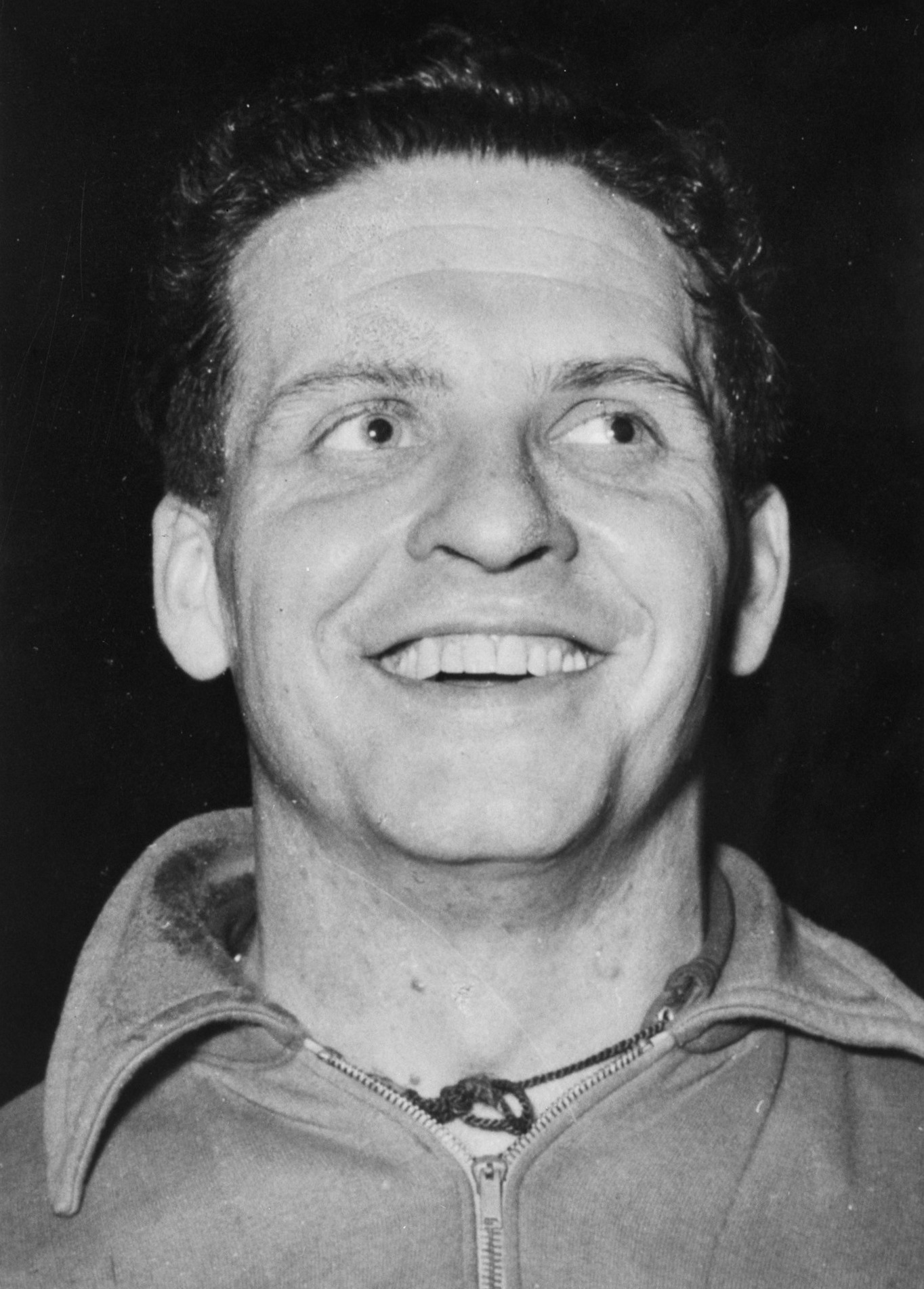

Personal information
- Date of birth: 26 January 1927
- Place of birth: Schoten, Belgium
- Date of death: 11 November 2012 (aged 85)
- Place of death: , Belgium
- Position: Midfielder

Senior career*
Years	Team	Apps	(Gls)
1944–1964	Royal Antwerp	555	(36)

International career
1949–1960	Belgium	68	(3)
- * Club domestic league appearances and goals

Victor Mees (26 January 1927 – 11 November 2012), nicknamed Vic or Vicky, was a Belgian footballer who played all of his career at Royal Antwerp.

== Club career ==
Mees was born in Antwerp. He made his first team debut at the age of 17, just after World War II. Mees, who had become a leader of the team, won its first Championship title in 1957, having won the Belgian Cup two years before.

== International career ==
Known as a gentleman footballer, Mees was at the time a pillar of the national team. In total, Mees made 68 appearances and he played in the 1954 World Cup.

== Awards ==
He won the Belgian Golden Shoe in 1956 while at Antwerp. In 2002, he was voted Antwerp player of the century.

== Honours ==
=== Player ===
Royal Antwerp

- Belgian First Division: 1956–57
- Belgian Cup: 1954–55

=== Individual ===
- Belgian Golden Shoe: 1956
- Royal Antwerp Player of the Century (2002)
- Former Belgium's Most Capped Player: 1958–1973 (68 caps)
