= Robert Paverick =

Belgian footballer

Personal information
- Full name: Robert Paverick
- Date of birth: 19 November 1912
- Place of birth: Borgerhout, Belgium
- Date of death: 25 May 1994 (aged 81)
- Place of death: Belgium
- Position: Defender

Senior career*
Years	Team	Apps	(Gls)
1930–1947	Royal Antwerp	271	(8)
1948–1949	Beerschot VAC	?	(?)

International career
1935–1946	Belgium	41	(0)
- * Club domestic league appearances and goals

Robert Paverick (19 November 1912 – 25 May 1994) was a Belgian international footballer who played as defender.

Paverick played club football with Royal Antwerp and Beerschot VAC.

Paverick also earned 41 caps for the Belgian national side between 1935 and 1946. Paverick participated at the 1938 FIFA World Cup.

== Honours ==
Antwerp

- Belgian First Division: 1930–31, 1943–44
