= Maurice Martens =

Belgian footballer

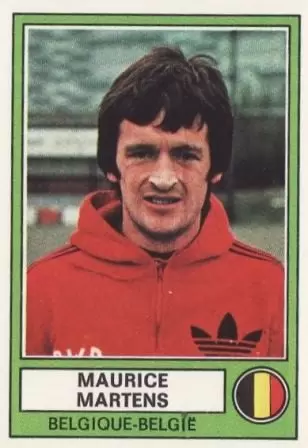
- Martens in 1978

Personal information
- Date of birth: 5 June 1947 (age 79)
- Place of birth: Aalst, Belgium
- Position: Left-back

Senior career*
Years	Team	Apps	(Gls)
1967–1971	Anderlecht		
1971–1973	Racing White Brussels		
1973–1983	R.W.D. Molenbeek		

International career
1971–1980	Belgium	26	(2)
- * Club domestic league appearances and goals

Maurice Martens (born 5 June 1947) is a Belgian former footballer who played as a left-back. He won the Belgian Golden Shoe in 1973 while at Racing White. He played 26 times and scored 2 goals for the Belgium national team between 1971 and 1980, starting in a 1–0 friendly win against Luxembourg on 7 November 1971. Having been a non-playing squad member at the 1970 World Cup. Martens was part of the team for the 1972 and 1980 European Championships but he did not play a match in the latter. He was transferred from Anderlecht to Racing White in the summer of 1970. Martens competed on the television show Superstars in 1976 (G.B. heat - 7th). He owned a sports shop whilst at R.W.D.

== Honours ==
Anderlecht

- Belgian First Division: 1967–68
- Inter-Cities Fairs Cup runner-up: 1969–70

RWD Molenbeek

- Belgian First Division: 1974–75
- Amsterdam Tournament: 1975
- Jules Pappaert Cup: 1975

Belgium

- UEFA European Championship: runner-up 1980; third place 1972
- Belgian Sports Merit Award: 1980

Individual

- Belgian Golden Shoe: 1973
- Man of the Season (Belgian First Division): 1972–73
