= Yves Baré =

Belgian footballer (1938–2010)

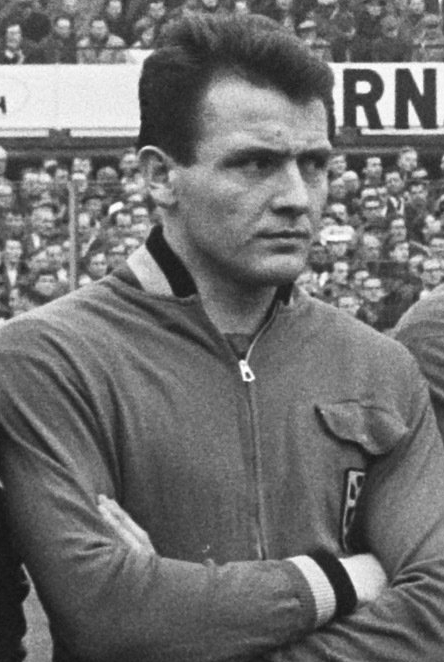

Personal information
- Date of birth: 28 October 1938
- Place of birth: Juprelle, Belgium
- Date of death: 1 April 2010 (aged 71)
- Position: Defender

Senior career*
Years	Team	Apps	(Gls)
1959–1970	RFC Liège		
1970–1972	Beerschot VAV		
1972–1974	Patro Eisden		

International career
1961–1967	Belgium	21	(0)
- * Club domestic league appearances and goals

Yves Baré (28 October 1938 – 1 April 2010) was a Belgian footballer who played for RFC Liège, Beerschot VAV, Patro Eisden and the Belgium national team.
