= Gaston Hubin =

Belgian footballer

Personal information
- Date of birth: 10 July 1886
- Place of birth: Brussels, Belgium
- Date of death: 13 September 1950 (aged 64)
- Position: Defender

Senior career*
Years	Team	Apps	(Gls)
1902–1908	Racing Club Bruxelles		
1908–1912	Excelsior SC Bruxelles		
1912–1923	Racing Club Bruxelles		
1923–1926	Léopold		

International career
1908–1914	Belgium	18	(1)
1912–1914	Belgium XI	3	(0)
- * Club domestic league appearances and goals

Gaston Hubin (11 July 1886 – 13 September 1950) was a Belgian footballer who played for Excelsior SC Bruxelles, Léopold, Racing Club Bruxelles and the Belgium national team.

He earned a total of 21 caps (3 unofficial) for Belgium between 1908 and 1914,
