= Christian Piot =

Belgian footballer

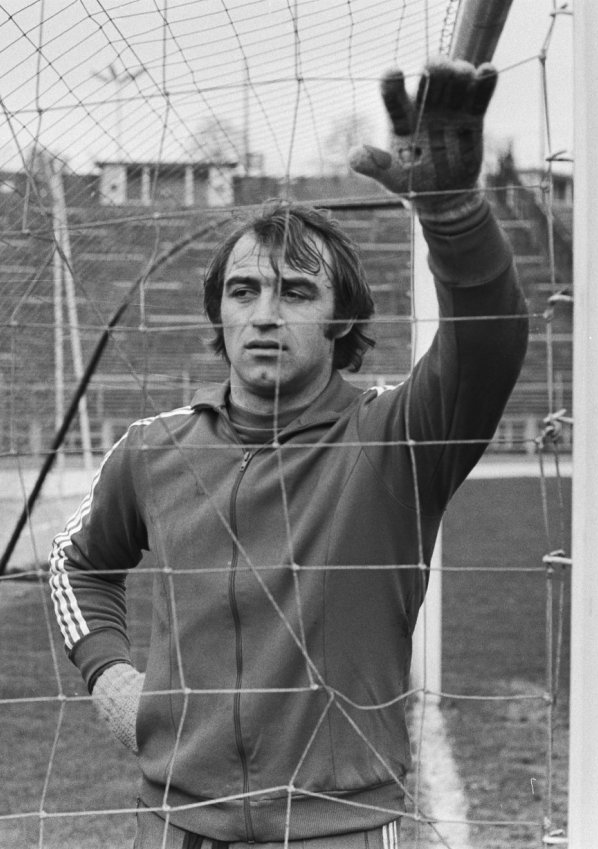
- Piot in 1977

Personal information
- Date of birth: 4 October 1947 (age 79)
- Place of birth: Ougrée, Belgium
- Height: 1.76 m (5 ft 9 in)
- Position: Goalkeeper

Senior career*
Years	Team	Apps	(Gls)
1966–1978	Standard de Liège	305	(9)

International career
1969–1977	Belgium	40	(1)

Managerial career
- 2000–2005: Standard de Liège (goalkeeper coach)
- 2005–2007: R.F.C. de Liège
- * Club domestic league appearances and goals

Christian Piot (born 4 October 1947) is a Belgian retired football goalkeeper who won the Belgian Golden Shoe in 1972 while at Standard Liège. He played 40 times and scored 1 goal for the Belgium national team between 1969 and 1977, starting in a 4–0 defeat to Yugoslavia on 19 October 1969. Piot was in the team for the 1970 World Cup and for the Euro 1972.

== Career statistics ==
No.	Date	Venue	Opponent	Score	Result	Competition
1	26 January 1977	Stadio Olimpico, Rome, Italy	Italy	1–2	1–2	Friendly

Source: 11v11

== Honours ==
=== Player ===
Standard Liege

- Belgian First Division: 1968–69, 1969–70, 1970–71
- Belgian Cup: 1966–67; runners-up: 1971–72, 1972–73
- Belgian League Cup: 1975
- Jules Pappaert Cup: 1971

Belgium

- UEFA European Championship: 1972 (Third place)

Individual

- Belgian Golden Shoe: 1972
