= Laurent Verbiest =

Belgian footballer

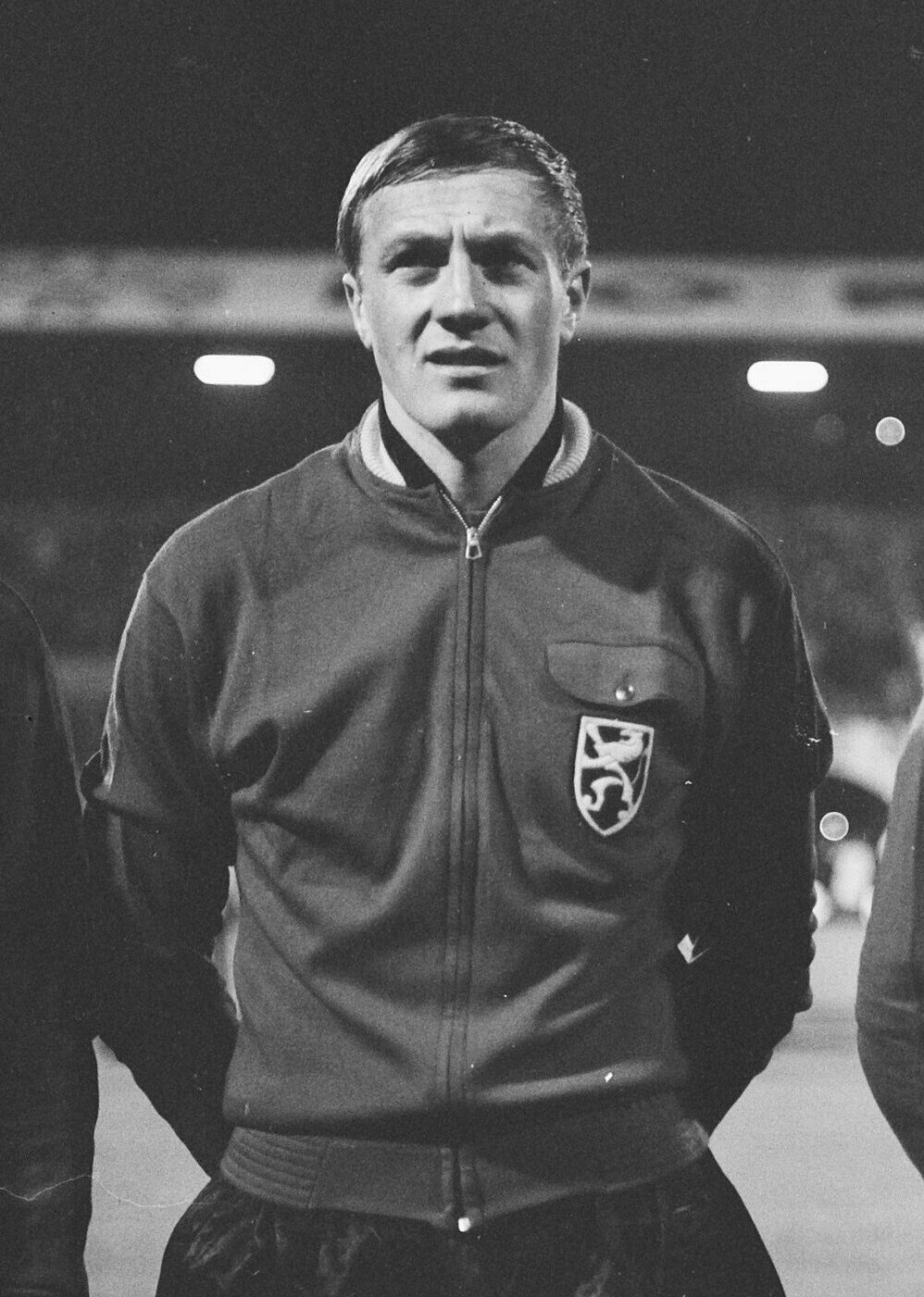
- Verbiest (Tokyo, 1964)

Personal information
- Full name: Laurent Verbiest
- Date of birth: 16 April 1939
- Place of birth: Oostende, Belgium
- Date of death: 2 February 1966 (aged 26)
- Place of death: Oostende, Belgium
- Height: 1.82 m (6 ft 0 in)
- Position: Defender

Youth career
- 1953–1956: Oostende

Senior career*
Years	Team	Apps	(Gls)
1956–1960	Oostende		
1960–1966	Anderlecht	120	(2)

International career
1960–1965	Belgium	23	(0)
- * Club domestic league appearances and goals

Laurent Verbiest (16 April 1939, Ostend – 2 February 1966) was a Belgian football player. He died in a car crash in the middle of his career.

== Career ==
=== Early years ===
Born and raised in Ostend, Laurent Verbiest was both a talented football player and cyclist in his youth. He also spent many hours on "De Vier Gebroeders", his father's fishing vessel. In the end, the sturdy teenager chose to join AS Oostende. The second division club could not keep the young defender out of the first team for long. Already at the age of 17, the daring guy claimed a place in Pol Gernaey's team. When the club dropped to the third division in 1959, Verbiest wanted to join RSC Anderlecht, but the board only let him leave a year later.

=== Professional career ===
In 1960, he made the switch to RSC Anderlecht, just like fellow townsman Wilfried Puis. The two people from Ostend traveled together by train to Brussels and became good friends. Verbiest impressed RSC Anderlecht with his excellent technique and in no time, became a crowd favorite due to his risky, but attractive style of play. The defender regularly dribbled opponents in a challenging manner, which also earned him the nickname "Lorenzo Le Magnifique". In one of his first matches against Santos FC with the Brazilian legend Pelé, Verbiest was one of the stars as right back.

In his third season, RSC Anderlecht took on Real Madrid in the European Cup I. The Royals were the absolute favorite with star footballers such as Ferenc Puskás, Alfredo Di Stéfano and Francisco Gento. But RSC Anderlecht drew 3–3 in Madrid and won the second leg 1–0, and reached the quarter-finals of the European Cup that season.

In April 1965, he was suspended for six months after insulting referee Willy Lepomme in a duel against Lierse SK. As a result, he missed the beginning of the 1965/66 season. He was allowed to participate in European competitions.

Verbiest also played for the national team for six years. On 2 October 1960, he made his debut for Belgium. It was then selection manager Constant Vanden Stock who first called him up. On 30 September 1964, he won against the Netherlands with Belgium. After the break (and the substitution of goalkeeper Delhasse by Jean-Marie Trappeniers), 11 players from RSC Anderlecht were on the field in that game. In total, Verbiest played 23 international matches.

On 2 February 1966, Verbiest died after a car accident. The 26-year-old footballer had visited his parents-in-law in Mechelen and drove back to Ostend, where he went off the rails near the Kennedy roundabout and died in the accident. A year after his death, RSC Anderlecht organized a memorial match against Ajax. Johan Cruijff, Sjaak Swart, Piet Keizer and Wim Suurbier, among others, traveled to Brussels. Anderlecht won the friendly game 4–1. Proceeds from the competition would go to Laurent's widow.

Laurent Verbiest won three national titles and one cup with Anderlecht. He is regarded as one of the most talented defenders to play for Anderlecht.

== Honours ==
=== Club ===
Anderlecht

- Belgian First Division: 1961–62, 1963–64, 1964–65, 1965–66
- Belgian Cup: 1964–65

=== Individual ===
- Belgian Bronze Shoe: 1962
- Puis-Verbiest trophy (KV Oostende player of the season): from 2016
