= Jean Nicolay =

Belgian footballer

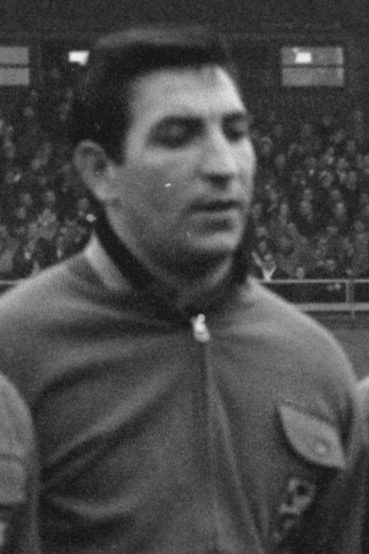
- Nicolay in 1961

Personal information
- Date of birth: 27 December 1937
- Place of birth: Liège, Belgium
- Date of death: 18 August 2014 (aged 76)
- Place of death: Liège, Belgium
- Position: Goalkeeper

Youth career
- 1953–1956: Standard Liège

Senior career*
Years	Team	Apps	(Gls)
1956–1969	Standard Liège	278	(0)
1969–1971	Daring Bruxelles	35	(0)
1971–1973	Royal Tilleur	14	(0)

International career
1959–1969	Belgium	39	(0)
- * Club domestic league appearances and goals

Jean Nicolay (27 December 1937 – 18 August 2014) was a Belgian footballer who played as a goalkeeper. He was the third Nicolay to come out of Standard Liège: his older brothers Adolphe and Toussaint played there too. He earned the Belgian Golden Shoe in 1963 while at Standard Liège. He made 39 caps for the national team between 1959 and 1967, his debut being a 0–2 friendly defeat to Austria on 24 May 1959.

Nicolay played between 1955 en 1969 with Standard Liège, where he won the Belgian Championship in 1958, 1961, 1963 and 1969, and the Belgian Cup in 1966 and 1967. In 1969 Nicolay transferred to Daring Club de Bruxelles. Later he also played at Royal Tilleur. After retiring from football, Nicolay was goalkeepers coach with Standard Liège, Mechelen, Metz, the Switzerland national football team and the Belgium national football team.

== Honours ==
=== Club ===
Standard Liège

- Belgian First Division: 1957-58, 1960-61, 1962-63, 1968-69
- Belgian Cup: 1964–65 (finalists), 1965–66 (winners), 1966-67 (winners)

=== Individual ===
- Belgian Golden Shoe: 1963
- Ballon d'Or nomination: 1964
- Knight of the Walloon Order of Merit: 2014
- Standard Liège Hall of Fame: 2024
