= List of RSC Anderlecht players =

RSC Anderlecht is a professional football team from Brussels, Belgium. The club was founded in 1908 and holds the record of Belgian championship titles. Players listed in this article are players who played in at least 100 games in the Belgian first division. The recordman of appearances in the first division for RSC Anderlecht is legendary player Paul Van Himst with 457 matches between 1960 and 1975. Joseph Mermans, nicknamed Le Bombardier (English: The Bomber) is RSC Anderlecht record goalscorer with 338 goals in 384 matches, between 1942 and 1957. Dutch international Rob Rensenbrink, who scored 141 goals in 261 league appearances for Anderlecht between 1971 and 1980 was voted the club's greatest ever player in 2008.

== Key ==
- Appearance and goal totals include matches in the Belgian Pro League only. Substitute appearances are included.
- Players are listed according to the date of their first-team debut for the club. Statistics are correct as of the end of the 2015-2016 season.

== Playing positions ==
GK	Goalkeeper	CM	Central midfielder
RB	Right back	LW	Left winger
CB	Centre back	AM	Attacking midfielder
LB	Left back	FW	Forward
RW	Right winger	ST	Striker

== Players ==
Name	Nationality	Position	Years in Anderlecht	Appearances	Goals
Ferdinand Adams	Belgium	ST	1920–1930	152	84
Jean Caudron	Belgium	GK	1922–1931	153	0
Joseph Luxen	Belgium	RW	1930–1945	147	26
Georges Van Calenberg	Belgium	RW	1931–1946	183	3
Jean Mertens	Belgium	GK	1932–1943	164	0
François Gets	Belgium	CM	1933–1939	100	21
Pierre De Pauw	Belgium	RB	1936–1945	105	0
Victor Erroelen	Belgium	CB	1936–1949	236	4
Michel Vanvarenbergh	Belgium	AM	1936–1953	312	128
Jean De Cuyper	Belgium	CB	1937–1948	149	3
François De Wael	Belgium	RW	1941–1950	200	110
Joseph Vernimmen	Belgium	CM	1941–1952	261	20
François Sermon	Belgium	LW	1941–1953	274	64
Jean Valet	Belgium	CB	1941–1954	287	49
Joseph Mermans	Belgium	ST	1942–1957	384	338
Henri Meert	Belgium	GK	1943–1959	312	1
Hippolyte Van Den Bosch	Belgium	CM	1944–1958	212	141
François Degelas	Belgium	CM	1947–1958	209	25
Arsène Vaillant	Belgium	LB	1948–1954	156	20
Henri Matthys	Belgium	RB	1948–1956	197	0
Marcel De Corte	Belgium	RW	1950–1959	139	37
Félix Week	Belgium	GK	1950–1960	134	0
Pieter Van Den Bosch	Belgium	FW	1951–1959	156	40
Willem de Koster	Belgium	CB	1951–1960	235	0
Gaston De Wael	Belgium	AM	1952–1961	112	63
René Vanderwilt	Belgium	CM	1954–1959	117	19
Charles De Vogelaere	Belgium	RB	1954–1961	105	1
Martin Lippens	Belgium	CM	1954–1964	232	54
Armand Jurion	Belgium	RW	1954–1968	390	72
Jacques Culot	Belgium	LB	1955–1961	167	0
Pierre Hanon	Belgium	CM	1955–1970	353	31
Jacques Stockman	Belgium	FW	1957–1966 and 1972–1973	246	142
Jean Cornelis	Belgium	CB	1958–1971	288	7
Jean-Marie Trappeniers	Belgium	GK	1959–1971	278	0
Jean Plaskie	Belgium	CB	1959–1972	182	2
Laurent Verbiest	Belgium	LB	1960–1966	120	2
Georges Heylens	Belgium	RB	1960–1973	360	10
Paul Van Himst	Belgium	AM	1960–1975	457	236
Wilfried Puis	Belgium	FW	1961–1971	274	55
Johan Devrindt	Belgium	ST	1964–1970	112	66
Jan Mulder	Netherlands	ST	1965–1972	145	89
Julien Kialunda	Zaire	CB	1965–1972	124	3
Jos Volders	Belgium	CB	1968–1974	105	4
Gilbert Van Binst	Belgium	RB	1968–1980	263	28
Jan Verheyen	Belgium	RW	1971–1975	111	5
Jan Ruiter	Netherlands	GK	1971–1977	179	0
Jean Dockx	Belgium	CB	1971–1978	216	12
Rob Rensenbrink	Netherlands	ST	1971–1980	261	141
François Van der Elst	Belgium	FW	1971–1980	248	82
Hugo Broos	Belgium	CB	1971–1983	351	2
Ludo Coeck	Belgium	CM	1972–1983	296	54
Jean Thissen	Belgium	CB	1974–1979	122	4
Jacky Munaron	Belgium	GK	1974–1989	293	0
Arie Haan	Netherlands	CM	1975–1981	198	35
Franky Vercauteren	Belgium	LW	1975–1987	367	92
Michel De Groote	Belgium	CM	1975–1989	294	25
Johnny Dusbaba	Netherlands	CB	1977–1981	117	1
Benny Nielsen	Denmark	FW	1977–1981	104	34
Kenneth Brylle	Denmark	FW	1980–1984	122	50
Luka Peruzović	Yugoslavia	CB	1980–1986	168	5
Morten Olsen	Denmark	CB	1980–1986	173	3
Wim Hofkens	Netherlands	RB	1981–1985	114	4
Walter De Greef	Belgium	LB	1981–1986	110	1
Juan Lozano	Spain	AM	1981–1987	129	42
Per Frimann	Denmark	CM	1981–1988	159	31
Erwin Vandenbergh	Belgium	ST	1982–1986	121	87
Henrik Andersen	Denmark	LB	1982–1990	173	13
Georges Grün	Belgium	CB	1982–1990 and 1994–1996	250	31
Arnor Gudjohnsen	Iceland	ST	1983–1990	139	40
Enzo Scifo	Belgium	CM	1983–1987 and 1997–2000	197	46
Adri van Tiggelen	Netherlands	RB	1986–1991	144	7
Luc Nilis	Belgium	ST	1986–1994	224	127
Charly Musonda	Zambia	CM	1987–1994 and 1996–1997	109	6
Wim Kooiman	Netherlands	CM	1988–1994	151	12
Filip De Wilde	Belgium	GK	1988–2002	371	0
Marc Degryse	Belgium	AM	1989–1995	171	66
Michel De Wolf	Belgium	CB	1990–1994	109	2
Graeme Rutjes	Netherlands	CB	1990–1996	152	7
Bertrand Crasson	Belgium	RB	1990–1996 and 1998–2003	293	20
Pär Zetterberg	Sweden	AM	1990–1991 and 1993–2006	285	74
Johnny Bosman	Netherlands	ST	1991–1996	156	71
Danny Boffin	Belgium	LW	1991–1997	189	30
Johan Walem	Belgium	CM	1991–1997	180	16
Bruno Versavel	Belgium	AM	1992–1997	124	37
Olivier Doll	Belgium	CB	1994–2004	182	5
Glen De Boeck	Belgium	CB	1995–2004	207	15
Oleg Iachtchouk	Ukraine	FW	1996–2006	119	32
Walter Baseggio	Belgium	CM	1996–2008	256	43
Didier Dheedene	Belgium	CB	1997–2001	102	9
Alin Stoica	Romania	CM	1997–2002	128	23
Bart Goor	Belgium	LW	1997–2001 and 2005–2008	228	42
Aruna Dindane	Ivory Coast	FW	2000–2005	131	50
Besnik Hasi	Albania	CM	2000–2006	108	1
Yves Vanderhaeghe	Belgium	CM	2000–2006	150	10
Olivier Deschacht	Belgium	LB	2001–2018	409	11
Hannu Tihinen	Finland	CB	2002–2006	101	12
Daniel Zitka	Czech Republic	GK	2002–2010	144	0
Vincent Kompany	Belgium	CB	2003–2006 and 2019–present	73	6
Anthony Vanden Borre	Belgium	CB	2003–2007 and 2012–2016	119	4
Jonathan Legear	Belgium	RW	2004–2011	123	20
Silvio Proto	Belgium	GK	2005–2016	285	0
Roland Juhasz	Hungary	DF	2005–2013	207	20
Jelle Van Damme	Belgium	LW	2006–2010	110	17
Lucas Biglia	Argentina	CM	2006–2013	204	14
Mbark Boussoufa	Morocco	AM	2006–2011	148	48
Marcin Wasilewski	Poland	RB	2006–2013	143	20
Guillaume Gillet	Belgium	RB	2008–2014 and 2015–2016	248	48
Matías Suárez	Argentina	FW	2008–2016	177	51
Cheikhou Kouyaté	Senegal	DF	2008–2014	153	4
Romelu Lukaku	Belgium	ST	2009–2011	73	33
Tom De Sutter	Belgium	ST	2009–2013	119	35
Sacha Kljestan	United States	CM	2010–2014	132	18
Dennis Praet	Belgium	AM	2011–2016	139	20
Youri Tielemans	Belgium	CM	2013–2017	102	13
