= Paul Van Himst =

Belgian footballer (born 1943)

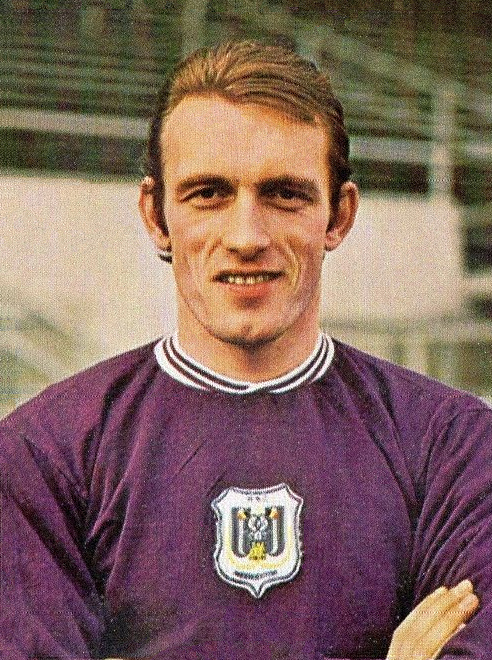
- Van Himst with Anderlecht in 1973

Personal information
- Full name: Paul Guillaume Van Himst
- Date of birth: 2 October 1943 (age 83)
- Place of birth: Sint-Pieters-Leeuw, Belgium
- Height: 1.81 m (5 ft 11 in)
- Position: Forward

Youth career
- 1951–1959: Anderlecht

Senior career*
Years	Team	Apps	(Gls)
1959–1975	Anderlecht	456	(234)
1975–1976	Molenbeek	21	(1)
1976–1977	Eendracht Aalst		
Total		477	(235)

International career
1960–1974	Belgium	81	(30)

Managerial career
- 1983–1986: Anderlecht
- 1987–1988: Molenbeek
- 1991–1996: Belgium
Medal record
Representing Belgium
UEFA European Championship
Bronze medal – third place	1972 Belgium
- * Club domestic league appearances and goals

Paul Guillaume Van Himst (born 2 October 1943) is a Belgian former football player and a football manager who played as a forward, most notably for R.S.C. Anderlecht. Regarded as Anderlecht's ultimate club icon, Van Himst holds the record of four Belgian Golden Shoe awards and was named best "Belgian footballer of the twentieth century".

== Early years ==
Van Himst was introduced to Anderlecht as a child because his father, who was an ardent fan of Jef Mermans, rarely missed a home match and regularly took his three children to the Émile Versé Stadium. The young Van Himst himself started to play football in a neighborhood of Sint-Pieters-Leeuw and on the playground of the Sint-Niklaas Institute where national coach Bill Gormlie took care of the children. He was noticed when he went to the training fields of the Anderlecht youth complex with his cousin. Van Himst was able to keep a ball in the air for several minutes, which made such an impression on chairman Constant Vanden Stock that he promptly had the boy sign a membership card.

But given Van Himst was barely eight, the connection only became official two years later. In the youth series, Van Himst was allowed to compete with older teammates.

== Club career ==
Under manager Pierre Sinibaldi, Paul Van Himst developed into a player who would be prominent in Belgian football for 15 years with his technique, insight into the game and precision passing.

About two months after his 16th birthday, Van Himst made his debut in the first team. In December 1959, the young striker was able to make his mark on the Beringen pitch. Following the example of Brazil, which had become world champions in 1958, Sinibaldi had Anderlecht play in a 4-2-4 system. In that formation, Van Himst became one of the most important pawns on the field. With his technique and nose for goals, he became a standout at Anderlecht as a teenager.

In the 1961–62 season, Paul Van Himst won his first trophy with Anderlecht, the national championship.

On his European debut against Real Madrid in 1962 at the Santiago Bernabéu stadium, he scored the opening goal in a 3–3 draw, arousing the interest of Italian top club Modena. They made him an offer, including his brother in the deal, but Anderlecht did not let its rising star leave. At the time, in addition to football, Van Himst also represented the fuel company of chairman Albert Roossens The club would later also reject proposals from teams like Barcelona and Real Madrid, in their search for a successor of Alfredo Di Stéfano.

Despite Anderlecht making an early exit in the second round of the 1966–67 European Cup, Van Himst became top scorer of the tournament. His five goals in the match against Finnish side FC Haka is still a (shared) record in a single European game.

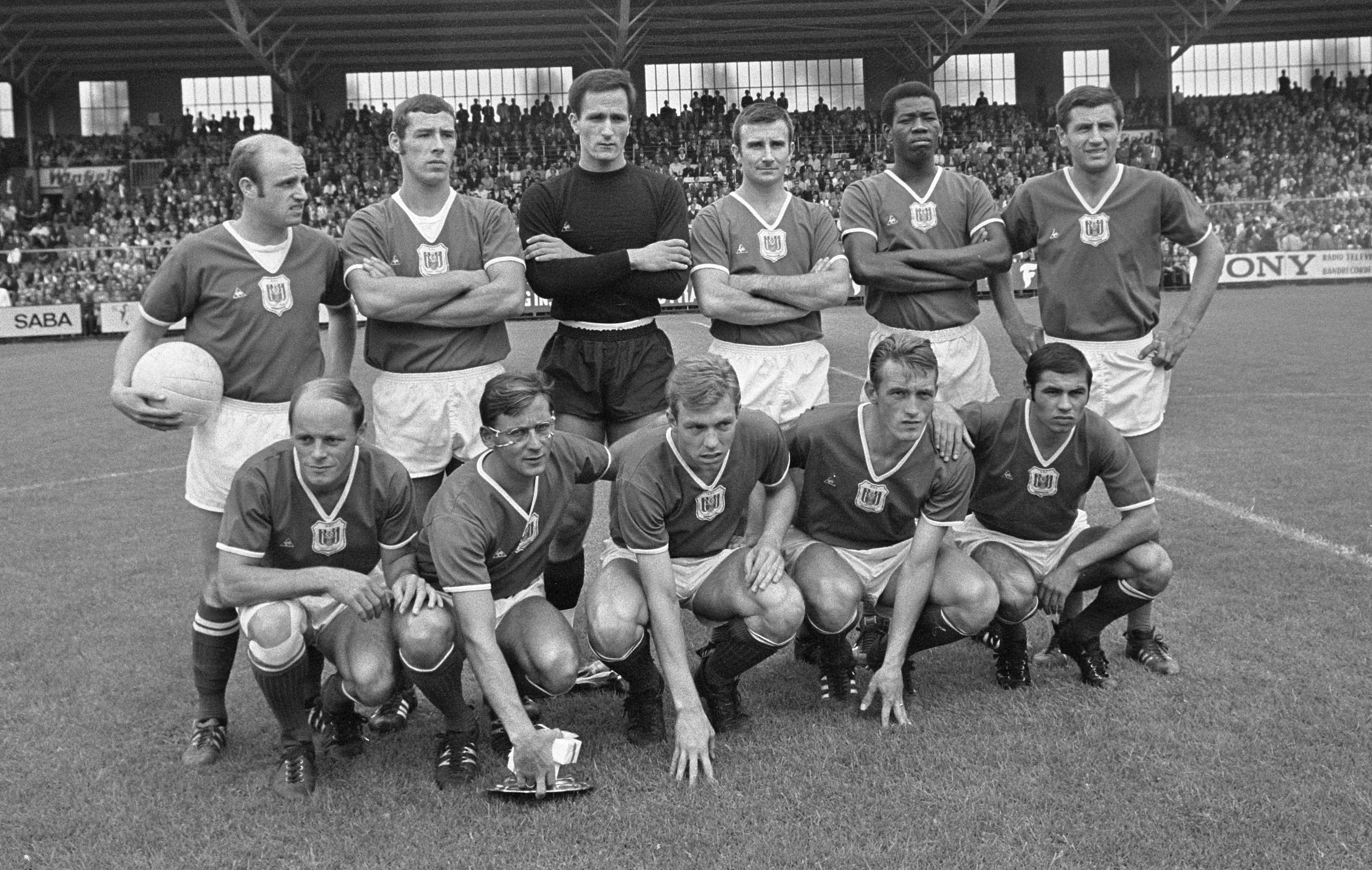
Anderlecht in August 1967. Van Himst below, second from right.

Anderlecht reached the final of the Inter-Cities Fairs Cup (considered as the predecessor to the UEFA Cup) in the 1969–70 season, but lost it to Arsenal F.C. Van Himst became top scorer of the tournament with 10 goals.

The lost final was a disappointment sportively and marked the end of the Sinibaldi era. Most players retired or left Anderlecht, but Van Himst was one of the few to stay. In a new team that relied on young players such as Hugo Broos, Ludo Coeck, Gilbert Van Binst and François Van der Elst, he was still important with his experience. Van Himst remained the leader on the field despite the generational change that had taken place.

With Anderlecht, Van Himst would win the Belgian championship eight times. He scored 309 goals in 566 matches during 16 seasons. Van Himst became the Belgian First Division's top scorer three times in 1963–64, 1965–66 and 1967–68.

Van Himst was nicknamed Polle Gazon by Belgian football fans (Polle is Paul in Brussels dialect, and Gazon means lawn in Dutch and French) as he frequently lay on the field due to the large number of fouls committed on him. Later, the nickname Le Pelé blanc (the white Pelé) was introduced by French newspaper L'Équipe after a convincing performance with Belgium in Paris against France.

After he left Anderlecht, he played for RWDM, another Brussels club, in 1975–76 and for Eendracht Aalst (then in the Belgian third division) in the following season. Two surgeries took their toll: neither at RWDM nor at Aalst Van Himst reached the same level as before. After winning the championship with Aalst, he ended his professional career in 1977, aged 33.

== International career ==
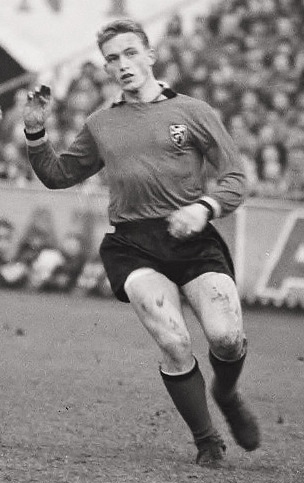
The 20-year-old Van Himst playing for Belgium in 1964

At the age of 17, Van Himst made his debut for the Belgian national team on 19 October 1960 in a match against Sweden. 11 days later, he scored his first goal in a 2–1 home victory over Hungary. In 1964, Van Himst played in the Belgium–Netherlands match alongside 10 Anderlecht players after the substitution of goalkeeper Guy Delhasse by Jean-Marie Trappeniers.

Van Himst was part of Belgium's team which qualified for the 1970 World Cup. At the Euro 1972, organized in his home country, Van Himst helped the Red Devils to reach the third place.

Between 1960 and 1974, Van Himst scored 30 goals (in 81 matches) for the Belgian national team. This performance made him Belgium's second top scorer—along with Bernard Voorhoof—and the most capped player for his country between 1973 and 1989. Romelu Lukaku broke their record in November 2017.

== Farewell match ==
In 1975, aged 31, Van Himst decided to leave Anderlecht. In a farewell match organized in the Anderlecht stadion, the then Anderlecht squad faced a "world team". Rinus Michels coached 18 international stars, including Pelé, Eusébio, Johan Cruyff, Gianni Rivera, José Altafini, Amancio, Jairzinho and Willem van Hanegem.

== Managerial career ==
Van Himst reunited with Anderlecht in 1982 when he started to manage the U-17 team. He was appointed head coach the following season, replacing Tomislav Ivić. In his debut season 1982–83, Anderlecht won the UEFA cup, after winning 2–1 on aggregate against Benfica, with Van Himst winning a European trophy after all. The following season, Anderlecht reached the UEFA cup final again, but lost it to Tottenham Hotspur after a penalty shootout.

In 1985, Van Himst guided Anderlecht to the league title, finishing 11 points ahead of nearest title-contenders Club Brugge. They also won the Super Cup in 1985, defeating Cercle Brugge 2–1. However, on 31 December 1985, Anderlecht and Van Himst parted ways. And, as he did as a player, Van Himst continued his managerial career at RWD Molenbeek.

In 1991, Van Himst was appointed as manager of the Belgian national team. He led the squad to the 1994 FIFA World Cup, where the team was eliminated by Germany in the round of 16. After Belgium didn't qualify for the Euro 1996, Van Himst was replaced by his assistant Wilfried Van Moer, and he quit professional football.

== Style of play ==
"The hallmark of Paul Van Himst was obviously his technique, but he was also physically very strong. Van Himst was really solidly built. That combination made him a quite unique player." reporter Frank Raes said in 2023. "And of course that light-footedness made everyone enjoy. The use of the outside of the foot for passing, dribbling ánd shooting was remarkable. He was so skilled in dribbling. As an opponent you just couldn't get the ball."

Van Himst preferred to "slalom" between opponents, but never lost the overview of the game when doing so. He also liked to operate from the left, where he could regularly put in splitting actions with his friend Wilfried Puis, both with Anderlecht and with the Belgian national team.

Van Himst scored easily, but could also let others score. He performed best with more physical strikers such as Jacky Stockman, Johan Devrindt or Jan Mulder.

== Personal life ==
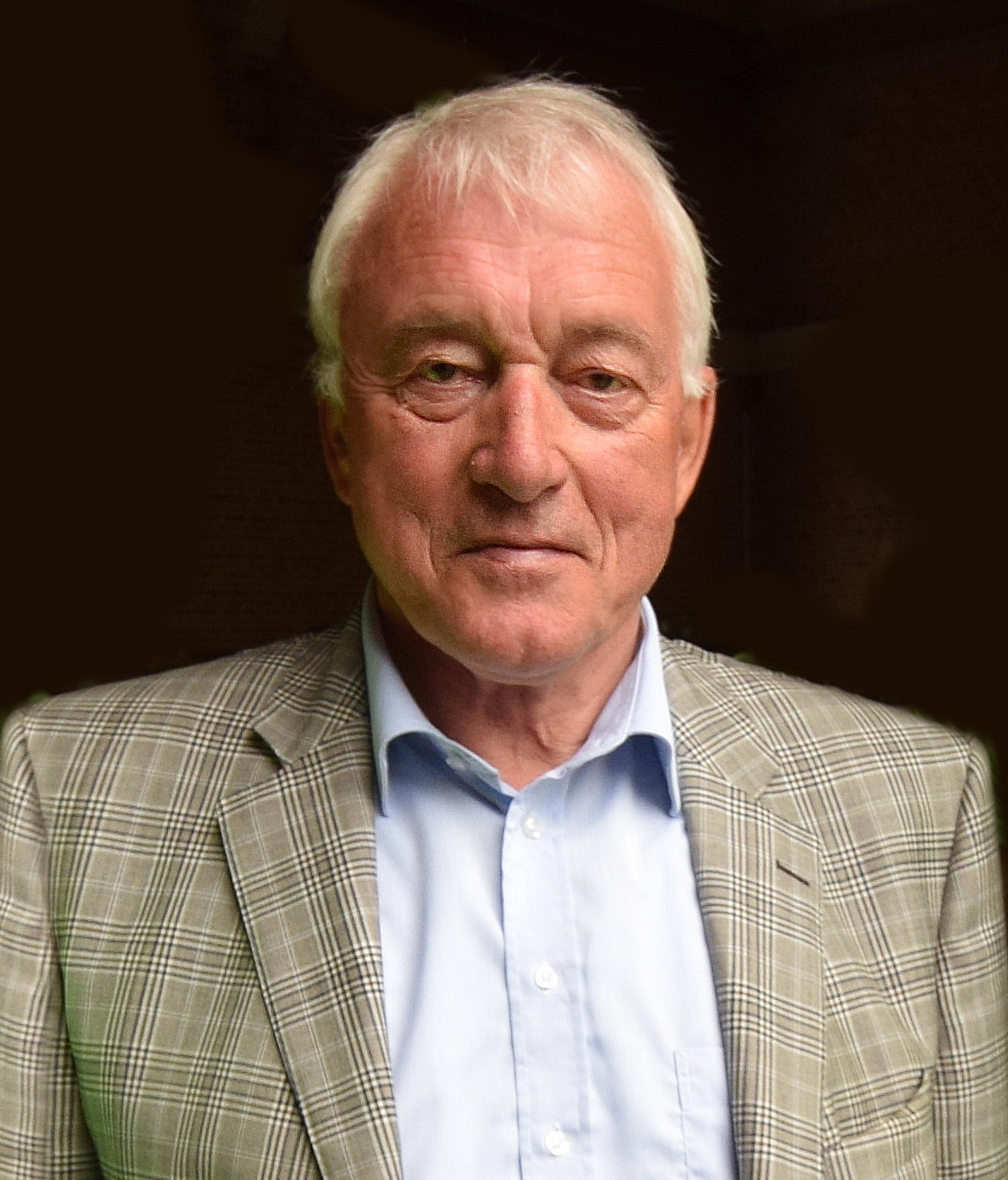
Paul Van Himst in 2016

Van Himst has three children (one son and two daughters) and five grandchildren.

In 1990, Van Himst took over the Brésor coffee roasting company. But after he was contacted to become national coach in 1991, his son Frank became manager of the company. From the moment the contract ended in 1996, the family man concentrated definitively on his coffee company, with his son keeping his position.

His wife Arlette Neckebroeck died on 4 December 2013.

For more than forty years, Van Himst has been close friends with cycling legend Eddy Merckx; both are regularly spotted together at Anderlecht's home games. In 2022, his grandson Amando Lapage signed a professional contract with the club.

== Filmography ==
- Escape to Victory (1981) - Michel Fileu
- Max (1994) - Himself

== Career statistics ==
=== Club ===
Note: Appearances and goals in the Belgian League Cup are not included.

Appearances and goals by club, season and competition
Club	Season	League			Cup		Europe		Total	
Club	Season	Division	Apps	Goals	Apps	Goals	Apps	Goals	Apps	Goals
Anderlecht	1959–60	Belgian First Division	15	7	—		0	0	15	7
Anderlecht	1960–61	Belgian First Division	30	13	—		0	0	30	13
Anderlecht	1961–62	Belgian First Division	29	10	—		0	0	29	10
Anderlecht	1962–63	Belgian First Division	30	14	—		6	1	36	15
Anderlecht	1963–64	Belgian First Division	29	25	3	2	0	0	32	27
Anderlecht	1964–65	Belgian First Division	29	24	4	5	5	4	40	32
Anderlecht	1965–66	Belgian First Division	29	26	5	7	4	6	38	35
Anderlecht	1966–67	Belgian First Division	30	18	5	7	4	6	39	31
Anderlecht	1967–68	Belgian First Division	28	20	2	4	4	5	34	29
Anderlecht	1968–69	Belgian First Division	27	10	2	2	3	0	32	12
Anderlecht	1969–70	Belgian First Division	29	15	4	3	10	10	43	28
Anderlecht	1970–71	Belgian First Division	30	16	5	4	6	2	41	22
Anderlecht	1971–72	Belgian First Division	30	14	6	2	2	1	38	17
Anderlecht	1972–73	Belgian First Division	29	7	6	4	4	1	39	12
Anderlecht	1973–74	Belgian First Division	27	7	4	0	1	0	32	7
Anderlecht	1974–75	Belgian First Division	35	8	6	1	6	2	47	11
Anderlecht	Total		456	234	53	41	56	33	465	308
RWD Molenbeek	1975–76	Belgian First Division	21	1	0	0	2	0	23	1
Eendracht Aalst	1976–77	Belgian Second Division	0	0	0	0	0	0	0	0
Career total			477	235	53	41	8	33	488	309

=== International ===
Appearances and goals by national team and year
National team	Year	Apps	Goals
Belgium	1960	3	2
Belgium	1961	6	4
Belgium	1962	7	2
Belgium	1963	5	3
Belgium	1964	6	2
Belgium	1965	7	5
Belgium	1966	5	3
Belgium	1967	4	2
Belgium	1968	5	0
Belgium	1969	3	1
Belgium	1970	4	0
Belgium	1971	7	3
Belgium	1972	8	3
Belgium	1973	3	0
Belgium	1974	7	0
Total		81	30

List of international goals scored by Paul Van Himst
No.	Cap	Date	Venue	Opponent	Score	Result	Competition
1	2	30 October 1960	Heysel Stadium, Brussels, Belgium	Hungary	1–0	2–1	Friendly
2	3	20 November 1960	Heysel Stadium, Brussels, Belgium	Switzerland	1–1	2–4	1962 World Cup qualification
3	5	22 March 1961	De Kuip, Rotterdam, Netherlands	Netherlands	2–1	2–6	Friendly
4	8	12 November 1961	Olympic Stadium, Amsterdam, Netherlands	Netherlands	4–0	4–0	Friendly
5	9	24 December 1961	Heysel Stadium, Brussels, Belgium	Bulgaria	3–0	4–0	Friendly
6	9	24 December 1961	Heysel Stadium, Brussels, Belgium	Bulgaria	4–0	4–0	Friendly
7	11	13 May 1962	Heysel Stadium, Brussels, Belgium	Italy	1–1	1–3	Friendly
8	13	14 October 1962	Bosuilstadion, Antwerp, Belgium	Netherlands	2–0	2–0	Friendly
9	18	24 March 1963	Heysel Stadium, Brussels, Belgium	Brazil	2–0	5–1	Friendly
10	21	25 December 1963	Parc des Princes, Paris, France	France	1–0	2–1	Friendly
11	21	25 December 1963	Parc des Princes, Paris, France	France	2–1	2–1	Friendly
12	26	21 October 1964	Wembley, London, England	England	2–1	2–2	Friendly
13	27	2 December 1964	Heysel Stadium, Brussels, Belgium	France	1–0	3–0	Friendly
14	32	27 October 1965	Émile Versé Stadium, Anderlecht, Belgium	Bulgaria	1–0	5–0	1966 World Cup qualification
15	32	27 October 1965	Émile Versé Stadium, Anderlecht, Belgium	Bulgaria	2–0	5–0	1966 World Cup qualification
16	33	10 November 1965	National Stadium, Ramat Gan, Israel	Israel	1–0	5–0	1966 World Cup qualification
17	33	10 November 1965	National Stadium, Ramat Gan, Israel	Israel	3–0	5–0	1966 World Cup qualification
18	33	10 November 1965	National Stadium, Ramat Gan, Israel	Israel	5–0	5–0	1966 World Cup qualification
19	38	22 May 1966	Sclessin, Liège, Belgium	Republic of Ireland	1–0	2–3	Friendly
20	39	25 May 1966	Heysel Stadium, Brussels, Belgium	France	1–0	2–1	Euro 1968 qualification
21	39	25 May 1966	Heysel Stadium, Brussels, Belgium	France	2–0	2–1	Euro 1968 qualification
22	40	19 March 1967	Stade Municipal, Luxembourg City, Luxembourg	Luxembourg	1–0	5–0	Euro 1968 qualification
23	40	19 March 1967	Stade Municipal, Luxembourg City, Luxembourg	Luxembourg	3–0	5–0	Euro 1968 qualification
24	50	24 April 1969	Heysel Stadium, Brussels, Belgium	Mexico	2–0	2–0	Friendly
25	56	3 February 1971	Sclessin, Liège, Belgium	Luxembourg	2–0	3–0	Euro 1972 qualification
26	56	3 February 1971	Sclessin, Liège, Belgium	Luxembourg	3–0	3–0	Euro 1972 qualification
27	58	20 May 1971	Stade Municipal, Luxembourg City, Luxembourg	Luxembourg	2–0	4–0	Friendly
28	64	13 May 1972	Émile Versé Stadium, Anderlecht, Belgium	Italy	2–0	2–1	Euro 1972 qualification
29	65	18 May 1972	Sclessin, Liège, Belgium	Iceland	1–0	4–0	1974 World Cup qualification
30	68	17 June 1972	Sclessin, Liège, Belgium	Hungary	2–0	2–1	UEFA Euro 1972 Third-place play-off

== Honours and awards ==
Van Himst holds the record of most Golden Shoe awards, having won it on four occasions. There could have been a few more, but at a certain point the organizers decided that one could not win the Shoe more than once. A few years later, that decision was reverted with Van Himst winning a fourth award in 1974.

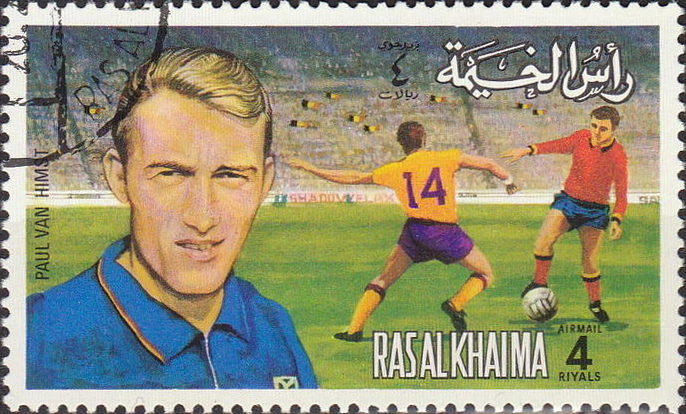
Van Himst on a Ras al-Khaimah stamp, 1972

In November 2003, to celebrate UEFA's Jubilee, he was named the Golden Player of Belgium by the Belgian Football Association as their most outstanding player of the past 50 years.

He has been an ambassador for the Belgian/South-African NGO "Born In Africa" since 2005.

In 2009, Van Himst became honorary citizen of Dilbeek.

Decades after retiring from professional football, Van Himst is consistently mentioned in both Anderlecht and Belgium's "Best Team Ever" and "Best Players" lists.

To celebrate the 80th birthday of their club icon, Van Himst was honored for the competition match of Anderlecht against Mechelen on 7 October 2023. For the occasion, the team played in a complete white "limited edition" shirts, stylized like the ones of the Van Himst era.

=== Player ===
Anderlecht

- Belgian First Division: 1961–62, 1963–64, 1964–65, 1965–66, 1966–67, 1967–68, 1971–72, 1973–74
- Belgian Cup: 1964–65, 1971–72, 1972–73, 1974–75
- Belgian League Cup: 1973, 1974
- Tournoi de Paris: 1964, 1966
- Inter-Cities Fairs Cup runner-up: 1969–70

Aalst

- Belgian Third Division: 1976–77

National team

- UEFA European Championship third place: 1972

Individual

- Belgian Golden Shoe: 1960, 1961, 1965, 1974
- Belgian First Division top scorer: 1963–64 (26 goals), 1965–66 (25 goals), 1967–68 (20 goals)
- Ballon d'Or: 1964 (5th place), 1965 (4th place)
- Ballon d'Or nominations: 1963, 1966, 1967, 1972
- 1966 FIFA World Cup qualification: Group 1 top scorer (5 goals)
- 1966–67 European Cup: top scorer (6 goals)
- L' Equipe European Oscar: 1967
- 1969–70 Inter-Cities Fair Cup: top scorer (10 goals)
- Man of the Season (Belgian First Division) (nl): 1970–71
- L' Equipe Oscar of the Oscars: 1971
- Former Belgium's Most Capped Player: 1973–1989 (81 caps)
- Belgian National Sports Merit Award: 1974
- Super Gouden Schoen: 1991
- Belgian Footballer of the 20th Century: 1995
- Planète Foot's 50 of the World's Best Players: 1996
- IFFHS European Player of the Century (39th): 2000
- Platina 11 (nl) - Best Team in 50 Years of Golden Shoe Winners: 2003
- UEFA Golden Player Award: 2003
- Bronze Zinneke award: 2006
- Honorary Citizen of Dilbeek: 2009
- The Best Golden Shoe Team Ever: 2011
- Honorary member of the Belgian trainers association BFC Pro: 2012
- DH The Best RSC Anderlecht Team Ever: 2020
- IFFHS All Time Belgium Dream Team: 2021

=== Manager ===
Anderlecht

- Belgian First Division: 1984–85
- Belgian Super Cup: 1985
- UEFA Cup: 1982–83; runner-up: 1983–84
- Jules Pappaert Cup: 1985

Individual

- Belgian Professional Manager of the Year: 1982–83

== Books ==
- Paul van Himst - Op Gouden Schoenen by Charles Baete and Vic Vermeir in 1971, De Schorpioen, 288 p. (Dutch, French)
- Monsieur Football by Charles Baete, Vic Vermeir and Camille Fichefet in 1971, Editions Arts et Voyages, 111 p. (French)
- Voetbal by Paul van Himst and Jacques Hereng in 1975, Standaard Uitgeverij, 198 p. (Dutch)
- Paul van Himst over voetbal by Jacques Hereng and Carlos De Veene in 1985, Standaard Uitgeverij 135 p. (Dutch) ISBN 9789002151385
- Over Mezelf by Paul van Himst in 2009, Borgerhoff & Lamberigts, 256 p. (Dutch, French) ISBN 9789089310972
- Confidenties van Paul Van Himst by Luc Pire in 2010, Renaissance du Livre, 191 p. (Dutch, French) ISBN 9789086871797

== See also ==
- List of UEFA Cup winning managers
