= Wilfried Puis =

Belgian footballer (born 1943)

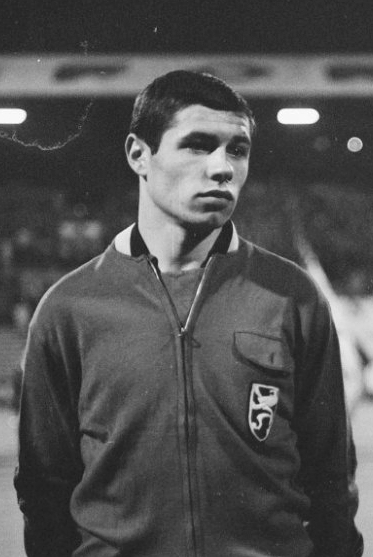
- Puis in 1964

Personal information
- Date of birth: 8 February 1943
- Place of birth: Ostend, Belgium
- Date of death: 21 October 1981 (aged 38)
- Place of death: Ostend, Belgium
- Height: 1.72 m (5 ft 8 in)
- Position: Striker

Senior career*
Years	Team	Apps	(Gls)
1960–1971	Anderlecht	267	(52)
1971–1972	Club Brugge	27	(1)
1972–1976	Lokeren	131	(10)
1976–1979	A.S. Oostende		
1979–1980	V.V. Koksijde		

International career
1962–1975	Belgium	49	(9)
- * Club domestic league appearances and goals

Wilfried Puis (18 February 1943 – 21 October 1981) was a Belgian footballer who played as a striker, notably for Anderlecht and the Belgium national team. Puis was praised for his speed, agility and goal kicks which made him and Paul Van Himst a perfect match. A year after he ended his football career, he died of stomach cancer at the age of 38.

== Club career ==
Puis was born in Ostend. While playing for Anderlecht, he won the Belgian Golden Shoe in 1964. In November 1971, Puis moved to rival Club Brugge. After one season, he was transferred to Lokeren.

== International career ==
Puis was in the Belgium-Netherlands match in 1964 with 10 teammates from Anderlecht after the substitution of goalkeeper Delhasse by Jean-Marie Trappeniers. In total, he played 49 times for the national team between 1962 and 1975, starting in the second half of a 3–1 friendly defeat to Italy on 13 May 1962. Puis played in all three group 1 stage games of the 1970 World Cup.

== Honours ==
Anderlecht

- Belgian First Division: 1961–62, 1963–64, 1964–65, 1965–66, 1966–67, 1967–68
- Belgian Cup: 1964–65
- Inter-Cities Fairs Cup runner-up: 1969–70

Club Brugge

- Jules Pappaert Cup: 1972

Individual

- Belgian Golden Shoe: 1964; runner-up 1965
- Puis-Verbiest trophy (KV Oostende player of the season): from 2016
