= Georges Heylens =

Belgian footballer (born 1941)

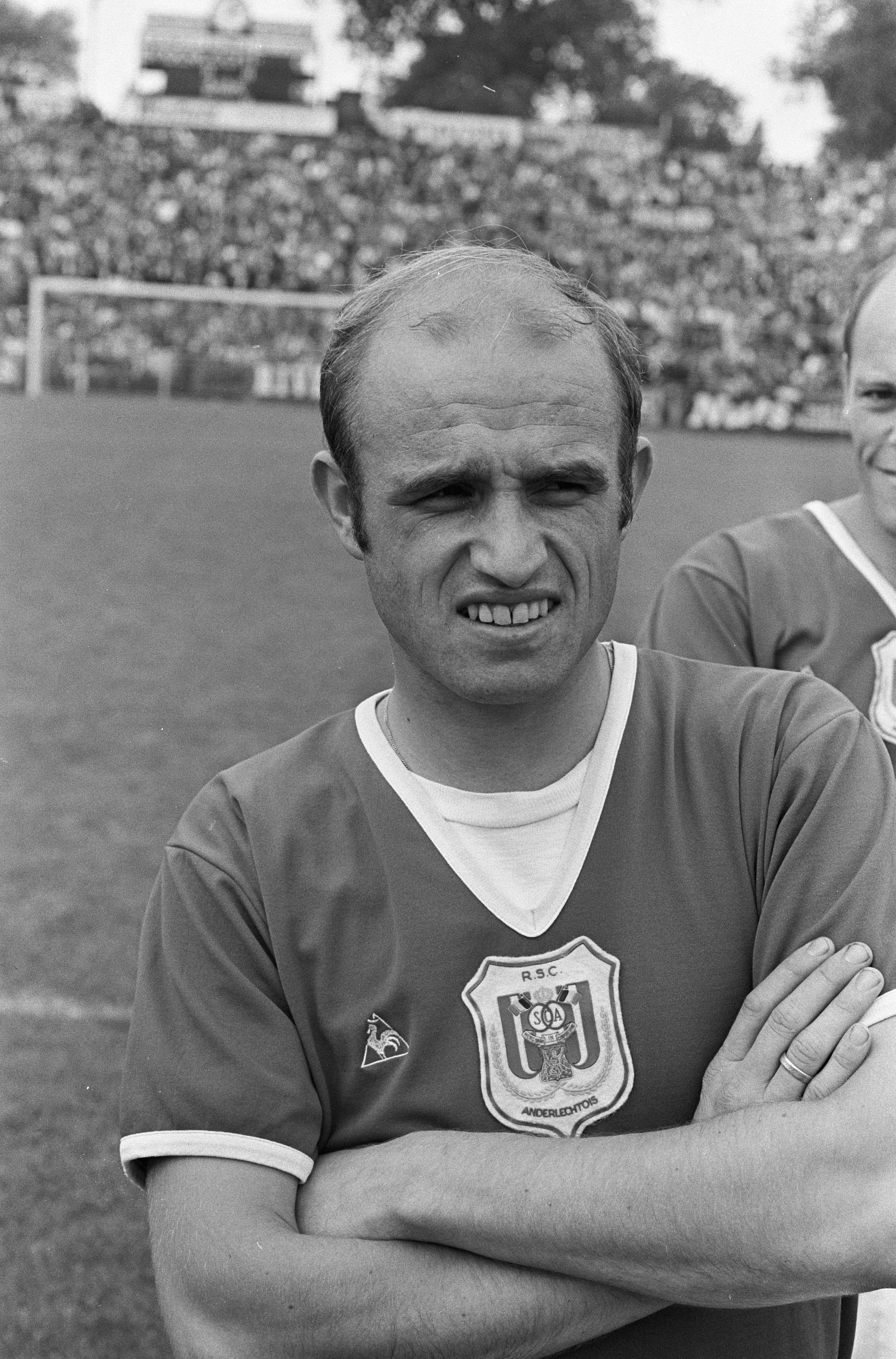
- Heylens in 1967

Personal information
- Date of birth: 8 August 1941 (age 85)
- Place of birth: Etterbeek, Belgium
- Height: 1.68 m (5 ft 6 in)
- Position: Right-back

Senior career*
Years	Team	Apps	(Gls)
1960–1973	Anderlecht		

International career
1961–1973	Belgium	67	(0)

Managerial career
- 1973–1975: Union SG
- 1975–1977: K.V. Kortrijk
- 1978–1983: Eendracht Aalst
- 1983–1984: R.F.C. Seraing
- 1984–1989: Lille
- 1989–1990: K. Beerschot V.A.C.
- 1990–1992: Charleroi
- 1993–1995: R.F.C. Seraing
- 1995–1996: Gençlerbirliği
- 1996–1997: K.V. Mechelen
- 1997–2001: Armée Royale Belge
- 2001–2003: FC Athois
- 2003–2004: R. Léopold Uccle Forestoise
- 2009–2011: U.R. Namur
- * Club domestic league appearances and goals

Georges Heylens (born 8 August 1941) is a Belgian former footballer who played as a right-back for R.S.C. Anderlecht and the Belgium national team. He participated in the 1964 match between Belgium and the Netherlands, alongside 10 teammates from Anderlecht, following the substitution of goalkeeper Delhasse by Jean-Marie Trappeniers. As an attacking right-back, he played in all three games at the Mexico World Cup, where he reached his 50th International appearance. He now works as a football consultant, appearing in papers and on TV.

== Honours ==
=== Player ===
Anderlecht

- Belgian First Division: 1961–62, 1963–64, 1964–65, 1965–66, 1966–67, 1967–68, 1971–72
- Belgian Cup: 1964–65, 1971–72, 1972–73
- Belgian League Cup: 1973
- Inter-Cities Fairs Cup runner-up: 1969–70

Belgium

- UEFA Euro third place: 1972

=== Manager ===
Individual

- Belgian Professional Manager of the Year: 1983–1984
