= Jean Cornelis =

Belgian footballer

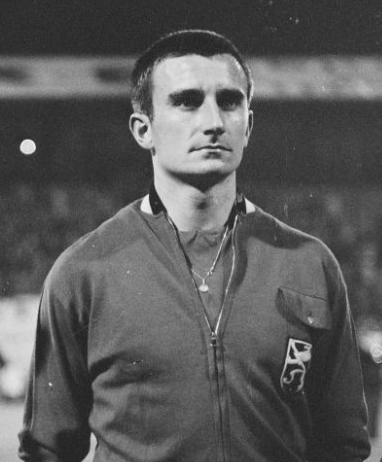
English: Football player Jean Cornelis at 1964 Olympic Games in Tokyo.

Jean Cornelis (2 August 1941 – 21 March 2016) was a Belgian football player. He was born in Lot.

He played for R.S.C. Anderlecht and the Belgium national team. Cornelis played in the match Belgium-Netherlands in 1964 with 10 fellows from the Anderlecht team after the substitution of goalkeeper Delhasse by Jean-Marie Trappeniers. He worked for R.S.C. Anderlecht.

== Honours ==
=== Player ===
RSC Anderlecht

- Belgian First Division: 1958-59, 1961–62, 1963–64, 1964–65, 1965–66, 1966–67, 1967–68
- Belgian Cup: 1964–65
- Inter-Cities Fairs Cup runners-up: 1969–70
