= 1970 Inter-Cities Fairs Cup final =

- Event: 1969–70 Inter-Cities Fairs Cup
Anderlecht	Arsenal
(Belgium)	(England)
3	4
- on aggregate

First leg
Anderlecht	Arsenal
3	1
- Date: 22 April 1970
- Venue: Constant Vanden Stock Stadium, Anderlecht
- Referee: Rudolf Scheurer (Switzerland)
- Attendance: 37,000

Second leg
Arsenal	Anderlecht
3	0
- Date: 28 April 1970
- Venue: Highbury, London
- Referee: Gerhard Kunze (East Germany)
- Attendance: 51,612

The 1970 Inter-Cities Fairs Cup final was the twelfth season final of the Inter-Cities Fairs Cup, staged on 22 and 28 April 1970 between Anderlecht of Belgium and Arsenal of England. In the first leg of the final, Anderlecht won 3–1, before the second leg was staged and Arsenal mounted a comeback with a 3–0 victory, winning 4–3 on aggregate and securing the season's title.

== Route to the final ==
Anderlecht				Round	Arsenal			
Opponent	Agg.	1st leg	2nd leg		Opponent	Agg.	1st leg	2nd leg
(Iceland) Valur	8–0	6–0 (A)	2–0 (H)	First round	(Northern Ireland) Glentoran	3–1	3–0 (H)	0–1 (A)
(Northern Ireland) Coleraine	13–4	6–1 (H)	7–3 (A)	Second round	(Portugal) Sporting CP	3–0	0–0 (A)	3–0 (H)
(Scotland) Dunfermline Athletic	3–3 (a)	1–0 (H)	2–3 (A)	Third round	(France) Rouen	1–0	0–0 (A)	1–0 (H)
(England) Newcastle United	3–3 (a)	2–0 (H)	1–3 (A)	Quarter-finals	(Romania) Dinamo Bacău	9–1	2–0 (A)	7–1 (H)
(Italy) Internazionale	2–1	0–1 (H)	2–0 (A)	Semi-finals	(Netherlands) Ajax	3–1	3–0 (H)	0–1 (A)

== Match details ==
=== First leg ===
22 April 1970

Anderlecht (Belgium)	3–1	(England) Arsenal
Devrindt 25'; Mulder 30', 74'		Kennedy 82'

Constant Vanden Stock Stadium, Anderlecht
Attendance: 37,000
Referee: Rudolf Scheurer (Switzerland)

Anderlecht

Arsenal

GK	1	(Belgium) Jean-Marie Trappeniers
RB	2	(Belgium) Georges Heylens
	3	(Belgium) Jean Cornelis	(substituted off) 68'
	4	(Sweden) Thomas Nordahl
	5	(Belgium) Johnny Velkeneers
	6	(Democratic Republic of the Congo) Julien Kialunda
	7	(Belgium) Gérard Desanghere
	8	(Belgium) Johan Devrindt
FW	9	(Netherlands) Jan Mulder
FW	10	(Belgium) Paul Van Himst (captain)
	11	(Belgium) Wilfried Puis
Substitutes:
	12	(Belgium) Alfons Peeters	(substituted on) 68'
Manager:
(France) Pierre Sinibaldi

GK	1	(Scotland) Bob Wilson
FB	2	(England) Peter Storey
FB	3	(England) Bob McNab
CM	4	(Scotland) Eddie Kelly
CB	5	(Scotland) Frank McLintock (c)
CB	6	(England) Peter Simpson
RM	7	(England) George Armstrong
CM	8	(England) Jon Sammels
FW	9	(England) John Radford
FW	10	(England) Charlie George	(substituted off) 77'
LM	11	(Scotland) George Graham
Substitutes:
FW	12	(England) Ray Kennedy	(substituted on) 77'
Manager:
(England) Bertie Mee

=== Second leg ===
28 April 1970

Arsenal (England)	3–0	(Belgium) Anderlecht
Kelly 25'; Radford 75'; Sammels 76'

Highbury, London
Attendance: 51,612
Referee: Gerhard Kunze (East Germany)

Arsenal

Anderlecht

GK	1	(Scotland) Bob Wilson
FB	2	(England) Peter Storey
FB	3	(England) Bob McNab
CM	4	(Scotland) Eddie Kelly
CB	5	(Scotland) Frank McLintock (c)
CB	6	(England) Peter Simpson
RM	7	(England) George Armstrong
CM	8	(England) Jon Sammels
FW	9	(England) John Radford
FW	10	(England) Charlie George
LM	11	(Scotland) George Graham
Manager:
(England) Bertie Mee

GK	1	(Belgium) Jean-Marie Trappeniers
RB	2	(Belgium) Georges Heylens
	3	(Belgium) Maurice Martens
	4	(Sweden) Thomas Nordahl
	5	(Belgium) Johnny Velkeneers
	6	(Democratic Republic of the Congo) Julien Kialunda
	7	(Belgium) Gérard Desanghere
	8	(Belgium) Johan Devrindt
FW	9	(Netherlands) Jan Mulder
FW	10	(Belgium) Paul Van Himst (c)
	11	(Belgium) Wilfried Puis
Manager:
(France) Pierre Sinibaldi

Arsenal won 4–3 on aggregate.

== See also ==
- Arsenal F.C. in European football
- R.S.C. Anderlecht in European football
