= Johan Devrindt =

Belgian footballer

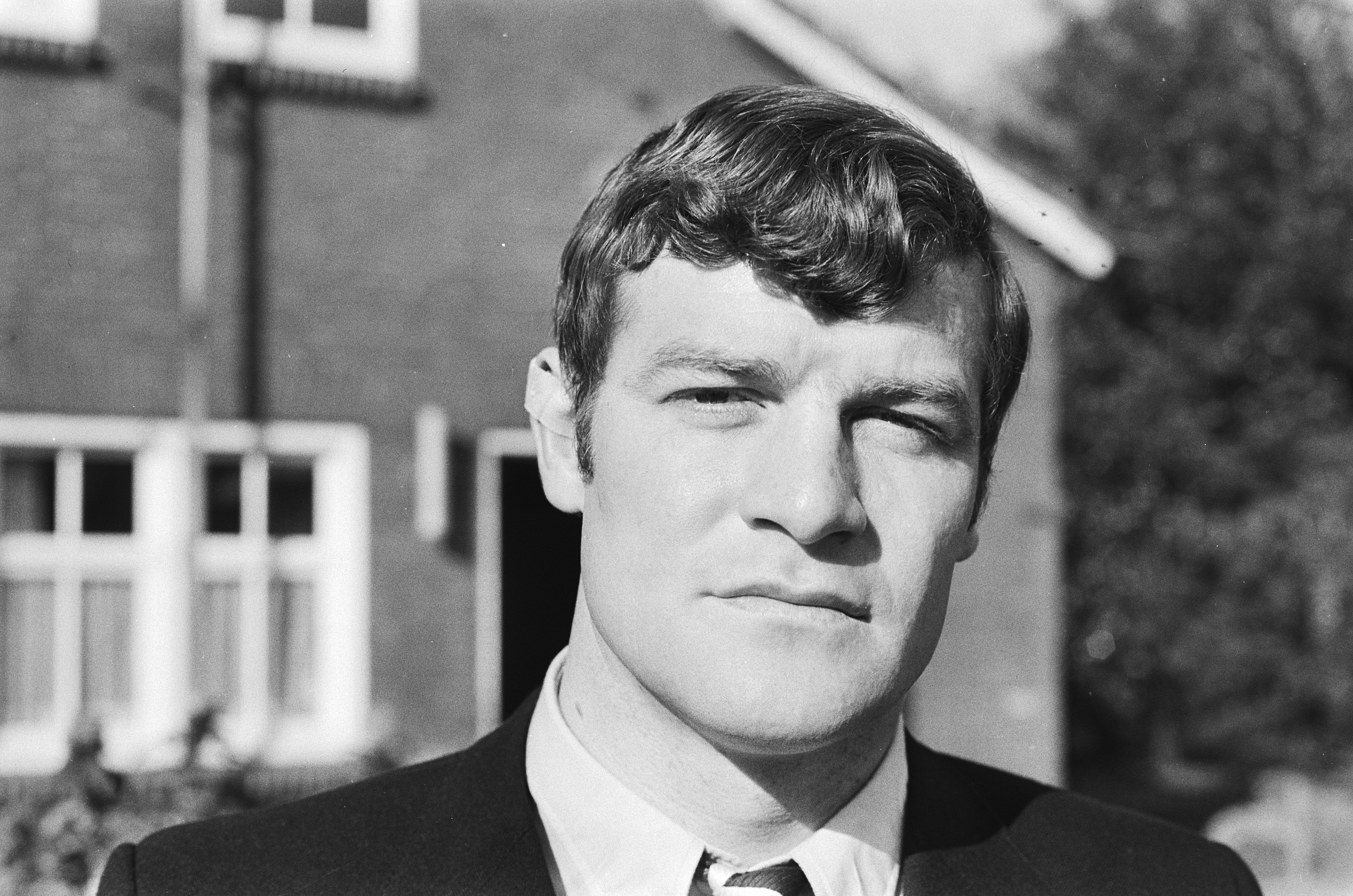
- Devrindt in 1971

Personal information
- Full name: Johannes Devrindt
- Date of birth: 14 April 1945 (age 81)
- Place of birth: Lommel, Belgium
- Position: Forward

Youth career
- VV Overpelt Fabriek

Senior career*
Years	Team	Apps	(Gls)
1964–1970	Anderlecht		
1970–1972	PSV Eindhoven	58	(24)
1972–1974	Club Brugge	70	(32)
1974–1976	Lokeren	72	(27)
1976–1980	Winterslag		
1980–1981	La Louviere		
1981–1982	Tienen		

International career
1964–1975	Belgium	23	(15)
- * Club domestic league appearances and goals

Johannes "Johan" Devrindt (born 14 April 1945) is a Belgian retired footballer who played as a forward.

== Club career ==
Devrindt played for Anderlecht, Dutch outfit PSV Eindhoven, Club Brugge, Lokeren, Winterslag and La Louviere before hanging up his boots after suffering relegation with second division Tienen.

== International career ==
Devrindt made his debut for Belgium in a September 1964 friendly match against Holland with 10 fellows from the Anderlecht team after the substitution of goalkeeper Delhasse by Jean-Marie Trappeniers and has earned a total of 23 caps, scoring 15 goals. He has represented his country in 5 FIFA World Cup qualification matches and at the 1970 FIFA World Cup.

His final international was a September 1975 UEFA Euro 1976 qualifying match against East Germany.

== Honours ==
Anderlecht

- Belgian First Division: 1964–65, 1965–66, 1966–67, 1967–68
- Belgian Cup: 1964–65
- Inter-Cities Fairs Cup runner-up: 1969–70

Club Brugge

- Belgian First Division: 1972–73
- Jules Pappaert Cup: 1972

Individual

- FIFA World Cup 1970 qualification – UEFA Group 6 top scorer
- UEFA Euro 1972 qualifying Group 5 top scorer
