= Julien Kialunda =

Congolese footballer (1940–1987)

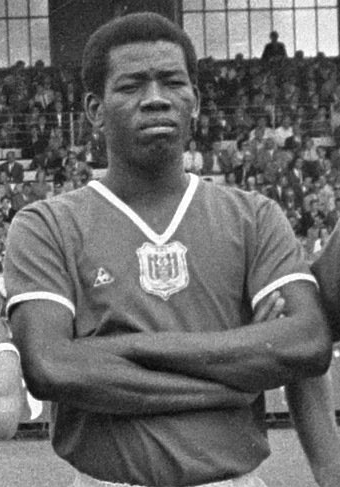
- Kialunda with Anderlecht

Personal information
- Date of birth: 24 April 1940
- Place of birth: Matadi, Belgian Congo
- Date of death: 14 September 1987 (aged 47)
- Place of death: Antwerp, Belgium
- Position: Central defender

Youth career
- 1960: Daring Léopoldville

Senior career*
Years	Team	Apps	(Gls)
1960–1965	Union Saint-Gilloise		
1965–1973	Anderlecht	123	(3)
1973–1980	Léopold FC		

International career
1972	Zaire	5	(0)
- * Club domestic league appearances and goals

Julien Kialunda (24 April 1940 – 14 September 1987) was a Congolese footballer. He was one of the first Congolese footballers to play professionally in Europe. He represented Zaire at the 1972 African Cup of Nations.

== Club career ==
Kialunda played for Union Saint-Gilloise, RSC Anderlecht and Léopold FC in Belgium. He was a four-time Belgian league champion with Anderlecht.

== International career ==
Kialunda represented Zaire at the 1972 African Cup of Nations in Cameroon, starting in all five of his team's matches as Zaire finished fourth.

== Post-career and death ==
After his retirement, Kialunda served as the national coach of the Zaire national team, though without much success. He also owned a cafe in the Brussels neighborhood of Matonge, known for its predominantly African population. In 1987, after falling ill with AIDS, he returned to Belgium for treatment and died on 14 September of that year.

In his memory, the "Julien Kialunda Foundation" was established, dedicated to supporting worthy causes in the Democratic Republic of the Congo. The foundation is sponsored by professional players of African origin who play or grew up in Belgium, like the brothers Mbo and Émile Mpenza, Mohammed Tchité and Anthony Vanden Borre.

== Honours ==
Union Saint-Gilloise

- Belgian Second Division: 1963–64

Anderlecht

- Belgian First Division: 1965–66, 1966–67, 1967–68, 1971–72
- Belgian Cup: 1971–72, 1972–73
- Belgian League Cup: 1973
- Inter-Cities Fairs Cup runners-up: 1969–70
