= Jan Mulder (footballer) =

Dutch former footballer

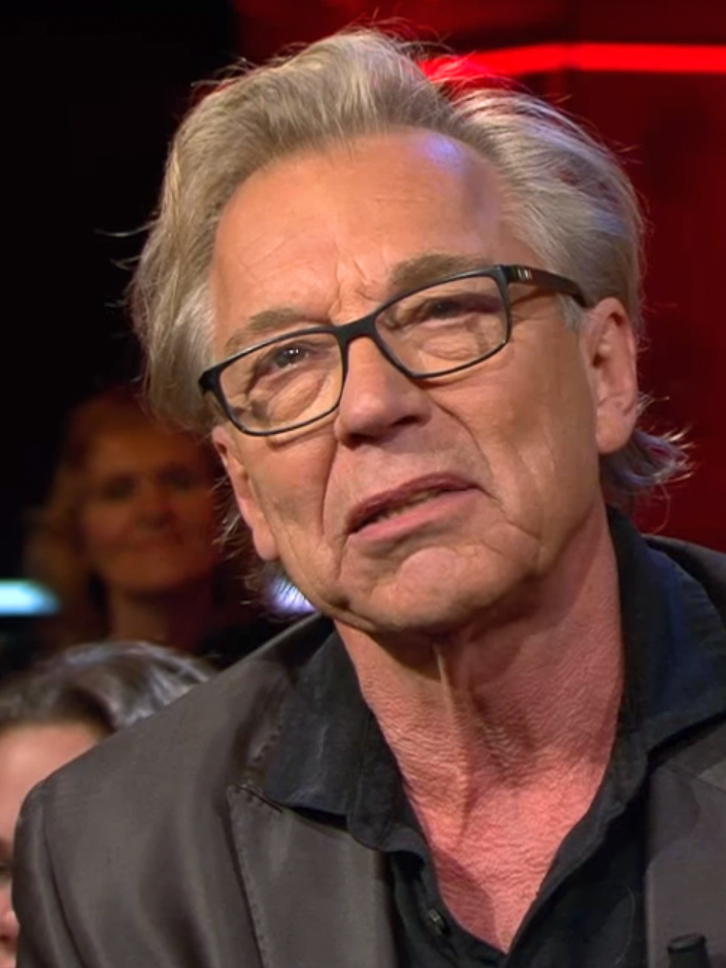
- Jan Mulder in 2017

Personal information
- Full name: Johan Mulder
- Date of birth: 4 May 1945 (age 81)
- Place of birth: Bellingwolde, Netherlands
- Position: Striker

Senior career*
Years	Team	Apps	(Gls)
1965–1972	Anderlecht	145	(91)
1972–1975	Ajax	56	(16)

International career
1967–1970	Netherlands	5	(1)
- * Club domestic league appearances and goals

Johan "Jan" Mulder (Dutch pronunciation: [ˈj(oːɦ)ɑm ˈmʏldər]; born 4 May 1945) is a Dutch former footballer, writer, columnist, and TV personality.

== Early life ==
Johan Mulder was born on 4 May 1945 in Bellingwolde in the Netherlands.

== Football career ==
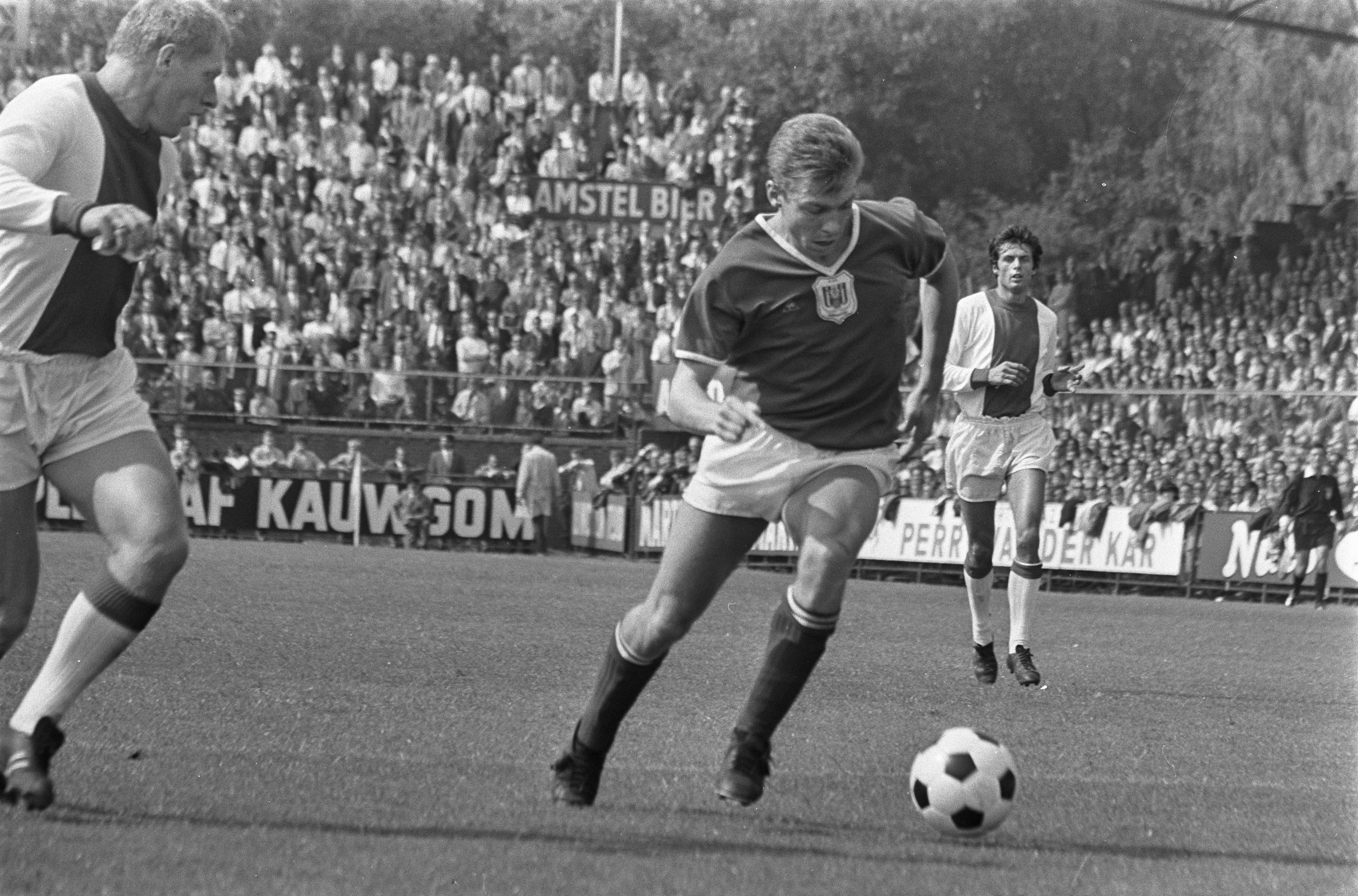
Mulder with Anderlecht against Ajax, 1967

Mulder was a football striker and played for R.S.C. Anderlecht and AFC Ajax. He also played five matches for the Netherlands, scoring once. Mulder was topscorer of the 1966–67 season in the Belgian Eerste Klasse. His son Youri also grew up to become a football player, spending most of his career in the German Bundesliga at FC Schalke 04 until he retired in 2002.

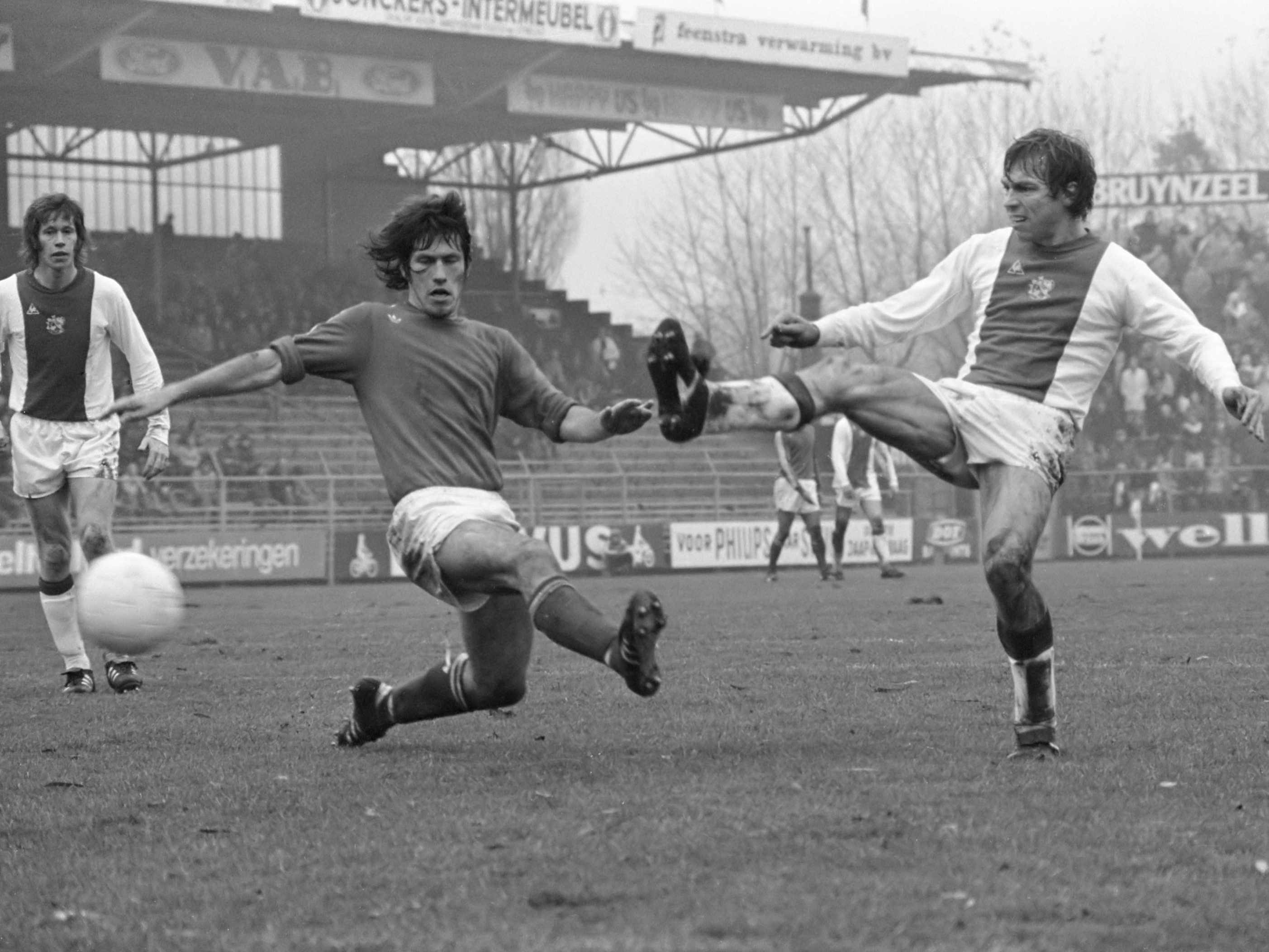
Mulder (right) scores for AFC Ajax in 1974

== Honours ==
Anderlecht

- Belgian First Division: 1965–66, 1966–67, 1967–68, 1971–72
- Belgian Cup: 1971–72
- Inter-Cities Fairs Cup runner-up: 1969–70

Ajax

- Eredivisie: 1972–73
- European Cup: 1972–73
- Intercontinental Cup: 1972
- European Super Cup: 1973

Individual

- Belgian First Division Top Scorer: 1966–67

== Writer and commentator ==
After his football career had ended, Mulder became a well-known writer, columnist and television-personality in the Netherlands, making his debut analysing a match of the Netherlands national football team broadcast by TV channel RTL 4 in 1996. From that point onwards he would frequently guest star in the RTL 4 shows by Frits Barend and Henk van Dorp, who presented both football-related programmes as well as talkshows concerning more political and social/public subjects. After having been a daily guest-star on the show Villa BvD, a football show during the 1998 World Cup in France (also hosted by Frits Barend and Henk van Dorp), Mulder made more and more TV appearances until finally becoming daily guest-star on the late-night talkshow Barend & Van Dorp since March 1999, until the show stopped in April 2006.

The final season of Barend & Van Dorp was shown on the channel Talpa, who had bought the programme from RTL 4 during the summer of 2005. Jan Mulder also frequently appeared on another show that was broadcast by Talpa; Eredivisie – De Wedstrijden, which aires several times a week and shows highlights of the Dutch Football League (the Eredivisie). After Barend & Van Dorp Mulder became a weekly side kick in De Wereld Draait Door.

Mulder has also written several works, ranging from ultra-short stories to novels. Most people will associate his name with CaMu, the partnership between Remco Campert (Ca) and Jan Mulder (Mu) that has been writing daily front-page columns for national newspaper de Volkskrant since 1995. These columns are traditionally bundled into books entitled CaMu Jaaroverzicht at the end of each year.

== Bibliography ==
- 1978: Opmars der strafschopgebieden
- 1982: De eeuwige reserve
- 1984: Sportjournalistiek bestaat niet
- 1987: De toespraken
- 1988: Diva in Winschoten (short stories)
- 1992: De middagduivel
- 1994: De vuurspuger van Ootmarsum
- 1994: Fiebelekwinten
- 1994: La vase
- 1994: Spreek en vergissing (novel)
- 1996: Mobieliquette
- 1999: Familie-album
- 1999: Villa BvD
- 2000: Overwinningen & nederlagen
- 2001: Spelers en speelsters
- 2001: Hollandse Velden
- 2002: De vrouw als karretje
- 2002: Strafschopgebieden & Reserves
- 2002: Opkomst & Ondergang
- 2003: Iris
- 2009: De analyticus
- 2009: Labradoedel
- 2010: Chez Stans
- 2014: Tot u spreekt Jan Mulder
- 2016: Duivelskunstenaar
- 2018: Liefde en Aardbevingen
