= Arsenal F.C. in European football =

English club in European football

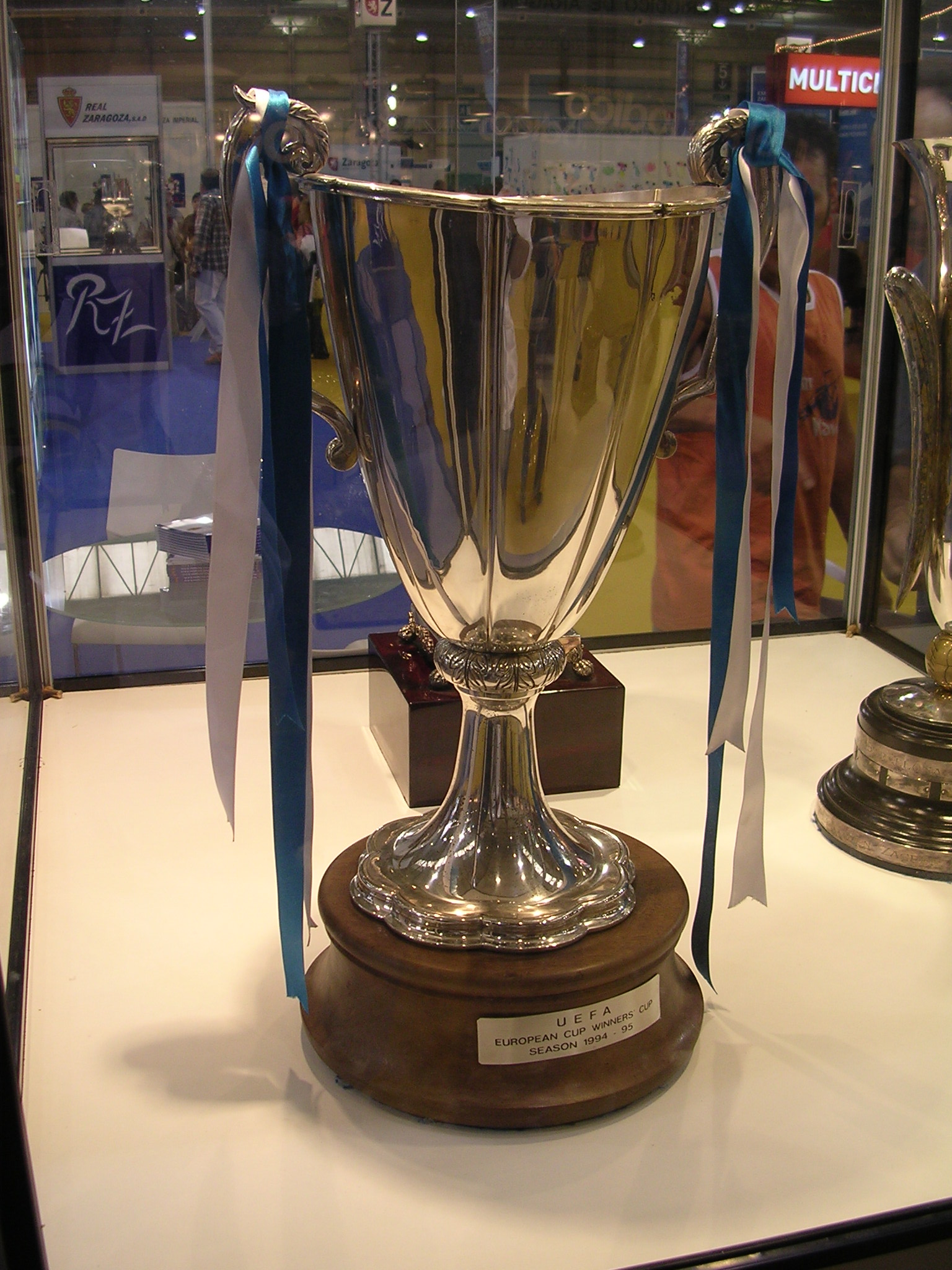
- Arsenal won the Cup Winners' Cup in 1994
- Club: Arsenal
- Seasons played: 41
- Most appearances: Thierry Henry (86)
- Top scorer: Thierry Henry (41)
- First entry: 1963–64 Inter-Cities Fairs Cup
- Latest entry: 2026–27 UEFA Champions League

Titles
- Cup Winners' Cup: 1994 (1)
- Inter-Cities Fairs Cup: 1970 (1)

Arsenal F.C. is an English professional football club based in Holloway, North London. The club's first European football match was played against Copenhagen XI on 25 September 1963, and they have since participated in European club competitions on several occasions, most of which organised by the Union of European Football Associations (UEFA). Arsenal have won two European honours: the Inter-Cities Fairs Cup in 1970 and the Cup Winners' Cup in 1994. The club played the 1994 European Super Cup and repeated its presence in the following year's Cup Winners' Cup final. Arsenal also reached the final of the UEFA Cup in 2000 and the Europa League in 2019, and became the first London team to appear in a UEFA Champions League final in 2006, before making a second final appearance in 2026. However, they lost all four.

Qualification for European club competitions is determined by a team's position in its domestic league, as well as how successfully a team fares in domestic cup competitions in the previous season. Following the Heysel Stadium disaster in 1985, UEFA placed an indefinite ban on all English teams from competing in Europe; the ban was lifted in the 1990–91 season and Arsenal entered in 1991–92 season, giving Arsenal the opportunity to play in the European Cup. Between 1998–99 and 2016–17, Arsenal qualified in nineteen successive UEFA Champions League seasons, an English football record, and is only surpassed in Europe by Real Madrid.

French striker Thierry Henry holds the club record for most appearances with 89, and is the club's record goalscorer in European competitions with 42 goals. Arsenal's biggest winning margin in Europe is a 7–0 scoreline, a feat achieved twice: firstly away at Standard Liège, during their successful Cup Winners' Cup campaign, and secondly at home against Slavia Prague, for the 2007–08 UEFA Champions League. Arsenal hold the European club competition record for the most consecutive clean sheets with ten, set between September 2005 and May 2006.

== Background ==
Club competitions between teams from different European countries can trace their origins as far back as 1897, when the Challenge Cup was created for clubs in the Austro-Hungarian Empire, who did not meet under normal circumstances. The Sir Thomas Lipton Trophy, named after entrepreneur and sportsman Thomas Lipton, was established in 1909 and was contested between clubs from Italy, Great Britain, Germany and Switzerland; the competition lasted for two years. The earliest attempt to create a cup for national champion clubs of Europe was made by Swiss club FC Servette. Founded in 1930, the Coupe des Nations featured clubs of ten major European football leagues and was deemed a success. Due to financial reasons, the competition was abandoned.

"The UEFA Cup is a consolation prize and the Cup Winners' Cup has been destroyed. Who plays in that now? Nobody. The fact is, the Champions League is all-important. It is turning into a European League and over the next three or four years I think that will become more and more clear."

— Arsène Wenger on the climate of European football, October 1997

In December 1954, French sports magazine L'Equipe published an article by journalist and former professional footballer Gabriel Hanot, who proposed the introduction of a European club competition. He initially suggested that each country should nominate a club to play in a mid-week European league; many clubs favoured a cup competition, which required less matches to play. A year later, L'Equipe sent out invitations to 18 clubs, selected by Hanot, Jacques Ferran and Jacques Goddet, with UEFA agreeing to administer the competition named as the European Champion Clubs' Cup. The European Cup Winners' Cup, later retitled the UEFA Cup Winners' Cup, was founded in 1960 and involved the winning clubs of national cup competitions in Europe. Arsenal, in the First Division at the time, were ineligible for both competitions, given that the club did not win a league championship or domestic cup for almost two decades. They however were invited to participate in the Inter-Cities Fairs Cup, an annual European club competition which was set up to promote international trade fairs; where a club finished in their domestic league had no relevance to qualification as teams were selected from cities holding trade fairs. The Inter-Cities Fairs Cup was regarded as the predecessor to the UEFA Cup, rebranded as the UEFA Europa League in 2008. Each competition round was staged over a two-legged tie, with the winner determined by the aggregate score. The away goals rule is activated if the aggregate score is equal.

To reinvigorate the European Champion Clubs' Cup, the competition was expanded and rebranded as the UEFA Champions League in 1992. From the 1997–98 season, it was further expanded to include eight domestic league runners-up selected by a UEFA coefficient and preliminary spots the following season were awarded to the third placed team; in some leagues fourth from 2002–03. The expansion and constant growth of the competition led to the decline of the Cup Winners' Cup, abolished in 1999 and by which point instigated proposals for a European Super League. Arsène Wenger has, on numerous occasions predicted the latter, arguing the pressure of television companies will force it to happen: "It's all about money. More games equal more money through TV revenue and I think the next few years will see not just two, but three or four teams from the top countries competing against each other. It's what television wants – big teams in big matches. That is why the Champions' League was introduced." Although Arsenal qualified for a fifteenth successive season of Champions League football in May 2012, this coincided with the club not winning a domestic honour since 2005, which led to open criticism over the competition's present format. Wenger however has gone on to defend the club policy, stating a trophy for Arsenal is winning the Premier League or the Champions League; "Would you like to finish tenth in the league but win the League Cup and say you have won a trophy? Certainly not."

== History ==
=== Early years: 1963–1978 ===
Arsenal first participated in European football during the 1963–64 season, via the Inter-Cities Fairs Cup. The competition was set up to promote international trade fairs in European cities, featuring clubs from cities playing in matches that hosted trade fairs. As London's representative, Arsenal was paired with Copenhagen team Copenhagen XI in the first round, played over two matches. The first match ended in a 7–1 victory for Arsenal, with Geoff Strong and Joe Baker both scoring hat-tricks. Copenhagen XI won the second match 3–2, but lost 9–4 on aggregate. Arsenal faced RFC Liège in the second round; the Belgian club won 4–2 on aggregate to progress into the quarter-finals.

In the 1969–70 season, Arsenal again participated in the Inter-Cities Fairs Cup, after a six-year absence. Having beaten Glentoran of Northern Ireland, Portugal's Sporting CP and Rouen of France, Arsenal played Romanian club Dinamo Bacău in the quarter-finals. A 1–9 victory on aggregate saw the club progress into the last four, where they faced Ajax of Amsterdam. The pairing of both clubs pleased Arsenal manager Bertie Mee, who wanted to play Ajax in the semi-finals to set up a possibility of meeting Internazionale in the final. At Highbury in the first leg, Arsenal won 3–0 and restricted Ajax to a 1–0 win at the Olympisch Stadion to reach the final of the Fairs Cup. It was the fourth successive year the final featured an English club and the first for a London club. Arsenal played Belgian opposition Anderlecht in the 1970 Inter-Cities Fairs Cup Final, played in the space of a week. Anderlecht won the first leg 3–1, with Arsenal midfielder Ray Kennedy scoring a crucial away goal, seven minutes from the final whistle. An early goal scored by Eddie Kelly helped Arsenal to what earlier looked to be an improbable victory; John Radford and Jon Sammels overturned Anderlecht's advantage to win 3–0 on the night and 4–3 on aggregate. The result ended Arsenal's 17-year wait for a trophy and ensured the club became the third successive English club to win the honour.

Arsenal entered the Inter-Cities Fairs Cup the following season as holders of the competition, but did not progress further than the semi-finals, losing on away goals to 1. FC Köln of Germany. The club did however win the league championship for the first time in 18 years, ensuring qualification for the European Champions Clubs' Cup in the 1971–72 season. Arsenal reached the quarter-finals, where the team lost to holders Ajax, who went on to retain the trophy.

Arsenal finished second in the 1972–73 Football League but did not play in the 1973–74 UEFA Cup, because the Football League continued to apply the one-team-per-city rule from the old Fairs Cup, and Tottenham Hotspur qualified as League cup winners. In subsequent seasons, the departure of Mee and lack of domestic honours meant that the club did not contest in European football.

=== Cup Winners' Cup finalists, winners: 1978–1995 ===
Mee was succeeded by Terry Neill in July 1976. Arsenal returned to European club football in the 1978–79 season, having finished fifth in the previous league campaign. The club contested in the UEFA Cup for the first time and won their opening leg 3–0 against 1. FC Lokomotive Leipzig; a commanding performance away from home in the second leg allowed Arsenal to win 4–1 at the Bruno-Plache-Stadion and 7–1 on aggregate. Arsenal progressed past the third round, winning on aggregate against Hajduk Split but were eliminated by Red Star Belgrade in the third round after striker Dušan Savić scored an away goal, two minutes from the end of the match.

As winners of the 1979 FA Cup Final, Arsenal entered the European Cup Winners' Cup in the 1979–80 season. The club defeated Fenerbahçe, 1. FC Magdeburg and IFK Göteborg, before facing Juventus in the semi-finals. After conceding an early penalty scored by Antonio Cabrini, Arsenal defender David O'Leary was injured and substituted in the 20th minute, when Juventus striker Roberto Bettega tackled him. Marco Tardelli was later sent off for a foul on Liam Brady and in the 85th minute, Arsenal managed to score an equaliser through a mix-up between Frank Stapleton and Bettega; the Italian put the ball into his goal net. Neill in his post-match comments expressed his anger over Bettega's tackle after the game: "I was shocked by a most vicious foul. I was shocked because I have always had the greatest admiration for him." A headed goal by substitute Paul Vaessen two minutes from the end, in the second leg was enough to take Arsenal into the 1980 European Cup Winners' Cup Final, where they faced Valencia in Brussels. A goalless draw after normal and extra time meant the final was to be decided on a penalty shootout, with Valencia winning 5–4.

Arsenal competed in the UEFA Cup in the 1981–82 and 1982–83 seasons and departed in the first and second round to FC Winterslag and Spartak Moscow respectively. The Heysel Stadium disaster of May 1985, during the 1985 European Cup Final between Liverpool and Juventus resulted in UEFA, and later FIFA, imposing a 'worldwide' ban on English teams from participating in European club competitions, initially for an indefinite period. Under George Graham, Arsenal returned to the European Cup in the 1991–92 season, having won the league championship a season earlier. They went out in the second round to Portuguese team Benfica in November 1991. The ban arising from the Heysel disaster had prevented Arsenal from competing in the European Cup when they won the league title two years previously, as well as preventing them from competing in the UEFA Cup on two occasions.

In the 1993–94 season, Arsenal contested in the European Cup Winners' Cup, having won the 1993 FA Cup Final. The club beat Odense BK and Standard Liège to reach the quarter-finals, with the latter described as a "breathtaking performance" by Graham, after winning 7–0 at the Stade Maurice Dufrasne. Arsenal defeated Torino of Italy and French representative Paris Saint-Germain to reach the 1994 European Cup Winners' Cup Final alongside Parma, staged at Copenhagen. Without top goalscorer Ian Wright and markers John Jensen and Martin Keown, Arsenal went into the final as outsiders. Although Parma began the match the strongest of both teams, Arsenal opened the scoring through a well taken volley by striker Alan Smith. Defending in numbers, the team held on to record an improbable victory and win the club's second European trophy, after a 24-year wait. After the match Graham praised his team's performance and defended his pragmatic approach; "Sometimes we could go forward a little bit more and entertain a bit more, but we play to our strengths, like we did in this match. There's nothing wrong with having a very, very good defence, believe me. We've proved it, and it's a big plus."

As holders of the competition, Arsenal was admitted into the Cup Winners' Cup for the 1994–95 season. They moreover contested in the 1994 European Super Cup, losing to Milan 2–0 on aggregate. In February 1995, Graham was sacked by Arsenal after it emerged he accepted an illegal £425,000 payment from Norwegian agent Rune Hauge for two of his clients: Jensen and Pål Lydersen. He was replaced by caretaker manager Stewart Houston (Bruce Rioch in the close season), who managed to take Arsenal into the 1995 UEFA Cup Winners' Cup Final after beating Sampdoria on penalties in the semi-finals. They however, did not retain the trophy after Real Zaragoza midfielder Nayim scored an extra-time goal, lobbing Arsenal goalkeeper David Seaman.

=== Arrival of Wenger: 1996–2005 ===
In August 1996, Rioch was dismissed by Arsenal. He was replaced by Arsène Wenger, who became the club's first manager born outside the British Isles. Wenger had creditable experience in UEFA club competitions; at Monaco he reached the final of the Cup Winners' Cup in 1992, losing 2–0 to Werder Bremen and took the club into the semi-finals of the European Cup in 1993–94. Wenger wanted Arsenal to become one of the biggest clubs in Europe, emphasising on buying talent from all over the world and patience shown by the club's board and supporters. His first involvement in a European match for Arsenal was against Borussia Mönchengladbach on 26 September 1996 in the UEFA Cup; Arsenal lost 6–4 on aggregate. Having watched the game from the stands in the first half, he assumed control in the second, suggesting the formation should accommodate four defenders instead of five.

Arsenal finished third in the 1996–97 league season, missing out on qualification for the UEFA Champions League by goal difference. They, however qualified for the UEFA Cup first round, but lost to PAOK Salonika of Greece over two legs in September 1997. Arsenal completed the double in the 1997–98 season, and winning the league ensured the club participated in the Champions League for the first time since its rebranding in 1992. To benefit from increased revenue and higher attendances, Arsenal was granted permission from the Football Association and UEFA to host their home Champions League matches at Wembley Stadium.

The club faced French champions Lens, Ukraine's Dynamo Kyiv and Panathinaikos of Greece in the group stages of the competition. Although they began the campaign in good stead, with two draws and a win, Arsenal lost 3–1 to Dynamo Kyiv and at home to Lens – watched by a record crowd of 73,707, meaning the club could not reach higher than third place, failing to make the quarter-finals. Arsenal ended the 1998–99 league season as runners-up, qualifying for the group stages of the Champions League for the second successive year. Again, Arsenal finished in third spot in their group, this time behind Barcelona and Fiorentina. The team, however advanced into the UEFA Cup third round and Arsenal chose to revert to playing their home matches at Highbury. Arsenal beat Nantes and Deportivo La Coruña over two legs and defeated Werder Bremen in the quarter-final; midfielder Ray Parlour scored a hat-trick in the second leg. In the semi-final against Lens, Arsenal secured a 3–1 aggregate win to face Turkish opposition Galatasaray in the final, who beat Leeds United.

At Copenhagen, the venue for the 2000 UEFA Cup Final, both Arsenal and Galatasaray played out to a goalless draw in normal and in extra time. Arsenal lost 4–1 in a penalty shootout, with striker Davor Šuker and midfielder Patrick Vieira hitting the post and underside of the crossbar respectively. Wenger reflected on the defeat by saying, "We did not play well in the first half, but we were much better afterwards. It is very disappointing." The final was overshadowed by events at the city centre, where Arsenal supporter Paul Dineen was stabbed in the back. Referred to as the "Battle of Copenhagen", the incident escalated into a riot between English and Turkish fans, forcing the Danish police to use tear gas in order to restore calm.

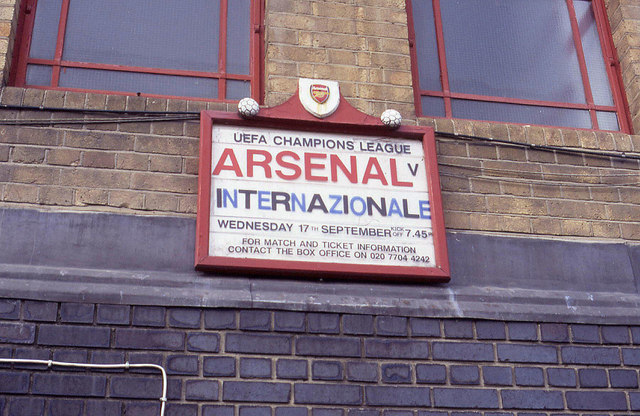
A sign outside Highbury, displaying the upcoming Arsenal–Internazionale match in September 2003.

Arsenal qualified for the group stages of the Champions League in the 2000–01 season, having ended the previous league season in second. The club won their first three matches in Group B, against Sparta Prague, Shakhtar Donetsk and Lazio. A draw away to Lazio at the Stadio Olimpico ensured qualification into the second group stage, where they were partnered with Bayern Munich, Lyon and Spartak Moscow. In spite of defender Sylvinho scoring an early goal in their opening game against Spartak Moscow, Arsenal plummeted to a 4–1 defeat, leaving Wenger to assess that "as a team, we didn't look as solid as we are used to." Wins at Lyon and at home to Spartak Moscow helped Arsenal to qualify for the quarter-finals as the French club failed to capitalise on Arsenal's defeat at Bayern Munich. They faced Spanish club Valencia, winning 2–1 at Highbury but the team were beaten 1–0 at the Estadio Mestalla, knocked-out on aggregate.

In the 2001–02 season, Arsenal played in the Champions League. The club qualified for the second group stage on goal difference but did not reach the quarter-finals, losing their final two matches against Deportivo La Coruña and Juventus. Having won the domestic league for the first time in four years, Wenger revealed the club's and his own intent to win the Champions League, telling French newspaper L'Equipe "I can't imagine finishing my life without winning the European Cup". Arsenal began the following season impressively, winning 0–4 at PSV Eindhoven. The match set a new club record, as midfielder Gilberto Silva scored the fastest goal, in 20.07 seconds. Although Arsenal lost their last two matches against Borussia Dortmund and Auxerre, coinciding with a blip in form domestically, they qualified for the second group stage for the third consecutive season. Striker Thierry Henry scored his first hat-trick in Europe for Arsenal against Roma on 27 November 2002 with the player stating; "It's wonderful to score a hat-trick but it's even more important that I did so in a game we've won." Arsenal failed to replicate their form at Roma, drawing their next four matches and losing to Valencia in the final match to finish third in their group and thus, out of the competition.

Arsenal entered the Champions League group stage in the 2003–04 season and faced Dynamo Kyiv, Internazionale and Lokomotiv Moscow. Without a win in their first three matches, Arsenal faced an early exit from the competition but managed a victory against Dynamo Kyiv, after defender Ashley Cole scored via a header. At the San Siro, Arsenal beat Internazionale 5–1, in a performance described as "one of the greatest results in [the club's] history". A win in their final group game against Lokomotiv Moscow was enough for Arsenal to top their group and play an unseeded team in the last 16. Arsenal eliminated Celta Vigo and faced fellow English club Chelsea at the quarter-final stage. Going into the first leg, Arsenal were favourites, having played their London rivals three times during the course of the season, winning on each occasion. Former Dutch international Johan Cruyff backed Arsenal to win the competition, saying "If Arsenal win it playing football the way only they know how then Europe would be proud to have such champions". A Robert Pires away goal at Stamford Bridge gave Arsenal an advantage going into the second leg, but Chelsea won 2–1 at Highbury with a late goal from Wayne Bridge to progress to the semi-finals. A year later, Arsenal exited the Champions League after losing 3-2 to Bayern Munich on aggregate, in the last 16 stage.

=== Regular qualification, European Cup runners-up: 2005 to 2017 ===
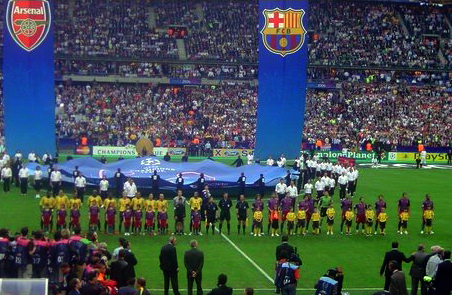
Arsenal and Barcelona players line up before the start of the 2006 Champions League final

Arsenal qualified for the group stages of the Champions League in the 2005–06 season, finishing first in a group containing Ajax, Sparta Prague and Thun. The club faced Real Madrid in the last 16; a solo goal by Henry at the Estadio Santiago Bernabéu in the first leg inflicted the home team's first defeat in 18 Champions League matches. Arsenal produced a disciplined display at home a fortnight after to reach the quarter-finals and become the sole English representative left in the competition. At home to Juventus, Arsenal won 2–0, and a goalless draw at the Stadio delle Alpi meant the club progressed into the semi-finals against Villarreal. In the club's final European match at Higbhury, Kolo Touré scored a first-half winner to give Arsenal a 1–0 win. A late penalty save by goalkeeper Jens Lehmann in the second leg sent Arsenal into the 2006 Champions League final, staged at the Stade de France, Saint-Denis. The result, another goalless draw, was Arsenal's tenth clean sheet in a row – a new competition record. Defender Sol Campbell, returning from injury praised the team performance in his post-match interview: "It's brilliant for us. It's also great for the manager Arsène Wenger to get to the final in France – I'm sure he will get a great reception." In the final against Barcelona, Lehmann was sent off in 18th minute for a professional foul on striker Samuel Eto'o. Wenger reacted by substituting Robert Pires for goalkeeper Manuel Almunia, thus altering the formation. In spite of the disadvantage, Arsenal took the lead in the 37th minute, after Henry's free kick was headed in by Campbell. Henry missed a chance in the second half to give Arsenal a two-nil lead before Eto'o equalised with fourteen minutes left. Substitute Henrik Larsson set up Juliano Belletti to score the winner for Barcelona. Wenger criticised referee Terje Hauge for sending off Lehmann, a view shared by club captain Henry and FIFA president Sepp Blatter.

As Arsenal finished fourth in the league, in the following season the club needed to play a third qualifying round, against Dinamo Zagreb in order to participate in the Champions League group stages. The team won 1–5 on aggregate, including a 2–1 victory in the first European match at the Emirates Stadium. Arsenal was eliminated in the Round of 16 stage, losing on the away goal ruling to PSV Eindhoven. In the 2007–08 season, Arsenal equalled their biggest home win in European football, scoring seven against Slavia Prague. The club beat holders Milan in the subsequent round, earning critical acclaim for their style of football, not least from Marcello Lippi: "It would be good for football if Arsenal could win. They play on the ground, they manoeuvre the ball, very, very well. It's very fast and very technical." At the quarter-final stage, Liverpool defeated Arsenal 5–3 on aggregate to set up a semi-final tie against Chelsea.

Arsenal progressed past the group stages of the 2008–09 Champions League season and beat Roma and Villarreal to face Manchester United in the semi-finals. A 1–0 defeat at Old Trafford meant Arsenal needed to win by two clear goals to progress, but goals from Park Ji-sung and Cristiano Ronaldo in the first eleven minutes ended the club's chances of reaching the 2009 Champions League Final. Wenger in his post-match press conference described the match as "the most disappointing night of my career", adding "I felt the fans were really up for a big night and to disappoint people who stand behind the team so much hurts." Arsenal lost to holders Barcelona 6–3 on aggregate in the quarter-finals the following season, and in spite of beating the Spanish club 2–1 at the Emirates Stadium in 2010–11, Arsenal again were eliminated, this time at the round of 16. Arsenal exited at the same stage of the competition for the second consecutive season, against Milan. Having lost the away leg 4–0, the team gave a valiant performance in the second leg at home, winning 3–0 on the night, but unable to find the final goal that would have taken the game to extra time.

In the 2012–13 season, Arsenal fell at the last 16 stage for the third time in three years, losing 3–1 to Bayern Munich at home, but managing to win 2–0 in the return leg, meaning they went out on the away goals rule. They were once again eliminated by Bayern Munich in the 2013–14 season after losing 2–0 at home, and drawing 1–1 away at Munich. They were eliminated by Monaco in Round of 16 in the 2014–15 season on away goals, and by Barcelona 5–1 on aggregate in 2015–16. Arsenal exited at the last 16 for the seventh consecutive time to Bayern Munich, losing 10–2 on aggregate.

In 2018, Arsenal managed to reach the semi-finals of the UEFA Europa League, where they suffered a 2–1 aggregate defeat against Atlético Madrid. It was the twenty-first straight and last season in which Arsenal was competing in European championships under manager Arsène Wenger, who announced his departure from the club on 20 April 2018.

=== Post-Wenger era ===
In 2019, under new manager Unai Emery, Arsenal managed to reach the final of the UEFA Europa League, where they lost 4–1 against fellow London club Chelsea. This defeat ensured that Arsenal would spend its third consecutive season since 2017–18 out of the UEFA Champions League. Next season's Europa League campaign was a disappointing one as Arsenal bowed out of the competition in the Round of 32, losing to Olympiacos on aggregate after extra time. By winning the 2019–20 FA Cup (and finishing 8th in the league), Arsenal qualified for the Europa League for the fourth consecutive season. They reached the semi-finals, losing 2–1 on aggregate to Villarreal, who went on to win the competition.

In 2020–21, Arsenal finished eighth in the Premier League, thus failing to qualify for any European competition in 2021–22 for the first time since the 1995–96 season – even missing out on the newly-introduced Conference League. Arsenal finished fifth in the 2021–22 Premier League, qualifying for the UEFA Europa League though missing out on a UEFA Champions League spot by two points to London rivals Tottenham. Arsenal topped their group consisting of FC Zürich, FK Bodø/Glimt, and PSV Eindhoven, directly qualifying for the Round of 16, where they drew 2–2 on aggregate and lost on penalties against Sporting CP after extra time. Arsenal finished second in the league in 2022–23, thus qualifying for a UEFA Champions League spot.

In the 2023–24 UEFA Champions League, Arsenal finished top of their group which consisted of Sevilla FC, RC Lens, and PSV Eindhoven, qualifying for the UEFA Champions League Round of 16 (for the first time since 2016–17), in which Arsenal drew 1–1 on aggregate and won on penalties against FC Porto, progressing to the quarter-finals for the first time since 2009–10 and breaking a sequence of seven Round of 16 exits in a row, but then lost 3–2 on aggregate to Bayern Munich. After finishing second in back to back seasons in 2023–24, Arsenal qualified for the new format, single-group UEFA Champions League for the 2024–25 season.

In the inaugural year of the league phase in the UEFA Champions League, Arsenal finished third, bypassing the playoff round as one of the top eight teams. They reached the semi-finals of the Champions League for the first time since 2009 after thrashing PSV Eindhoven in the last 16 and defeating Real Madrid 5–1 on aggregate in the quarter-final, but they were beaten by the eventual winners Paris Saint-Germain 3–1 on aggregate. Arsenal finished second for a third straight time in 2024–25, meaning that they qualify for the UEFA Champions League again in 2025–26.

In the 2025–26 UEFA Champions League league phase, Arsenal had a perfect record of 8 wins including wins against European powerhouses such as Bayern Munich and Inter Milan. Finishing first in the league stage gave Arsenal a bye into the round of 16, which they won 3–1 on aggregate against Bayer 04 Leverkusen. In their 3rd consecutive quarter-final appearance, Arsenal faced Sporting CP whom Arsenal edged out 1–0 on aggregate, qualifying them for the 2025–26 UEFA Champions League semi-finals for a second time in the row and their fourth semi-final appearance in their history. Arsenal then faced Atlético Madrid and won the tie 2–1 on aggregate, qualifying them for their first UEFA Champions League final in twenty years. Prior to the final, Arsenal broke a streak of three consecutive second place finishes in the Premier League by winning the 2025–26 Premier League, thus qualifying them for the Champions League once again in 2026–27. They lost the final against Paris Saint-Germain 4–3 on penalties after the match finished 1–1 after extra time.

== UEFA club coefficient ranking ==
In European football, the UEFA coefficients are statistics used for ranking and seeding teams in club and international competitions. Club coefficients are used to rank individual clubs for seeding in the UEFA Champions League, UEFA Europa League, and since 2021, the UEFA Europa Conference League.

Partial UEFA coefficient ranking as of 31 May 2025
Ranking			Club	Association	Coefficient					
2025	2024	Mvmt	Club	Association	2020–21	2021–22	2022–23	2023–24	2024–25	Total
1	3	+2	Real Madrid	Spain	26.0	30.0	29.0	34.0	24.50	143.50
2	1	–1	Manchester City	England	35.0	27.0	33.0	28.0	14.75	137.75
3	2	–1	Bayern Munich	Germany	27.0	26.0	27.0	28.0	27.25	135.25
4	5	+1	Liverpool	England	24.0	33.0	19.0	20.0	29.50	125.50
5	4	–1	Paris Saint-Germain	France	24.0	19.0	19.0	23.0	33.50	118.50
6	7	+1	Inter Milan	Italy	9.0	18.0	29.0	20.0	40.25	116.25
7	10	+3	Chelsea	England	33.0	25.0	21.0	0.0 (Note: Did not participate in European competitions that season)	30.00	109.00
8	8	–	Borussia Dortmund	Germany	22.0	10.0	17.0	29.0	27.75	106.75
9	6	–3	Roma	Italy	24.0	23.0	22.0	21.0	14.50	104.50
10	12	+2	Barcelona	Spain	20.0	15.0	9.0	23.0	36.25	103.25
11	11	–	Manchester United	England	26.0	18.0	19.0	7.0	32.50	102.50
12	22	+10	Arsenal	England	23.0	0.0	17.0	22.0	36.00	98.00

== Records ==
Arsenal was the first English side to defeat Real Madrid and Juventus away from home. The club was also the first to win against both Milanese teams: Internazionale and Milan at the San Siro. Goalkeeper Jens Lehmann kept ten consecutive clean sheets in the run-in to the 2006 Champions League final; the defence went 995 minutes until conceding a goal. Against Hamburger SV in the group stage on 13 September 2006, Arsenal became the first team in the competition's history to field a first eleven of different nationalities.

- Most appearances in European competition: Thierry Henry, 86
- Most goals in European competition: Thierry Henry, 41
- First European match: Copenhagen XI 1–7 Arsenal, Inter-Cities Fairs Cup, first round, 25 September 1963
- First goal scored in Europe: Johnny MacLeod, against Copenhagen XI
- Biggest win:

Standard Liège 0–7 Arsenal, in the Cup Winners' Cup, 2 November 1993
Arsenal 7–0 Slavia Prague, in the UEFA Champions League, 23 October 2007

- Biggest defeat:

Milan 4–0 Arsenal, in the UEFA Champions League, 15 February 2012
Bayern Munich 5–1 Arsenal, in the UEFA Champions League, 4 November 2015, 15 February 2017, 8 March 2017

- Highest European home attendance: 73,707, against Lens in the UEFA Champions League

=== By season ===
As of match played 21 October 2026
Key

- Pld = Matches played
- W = Matches won
- D = Matches drawn
- L = Matches lost
- GF = Goals for
- GA = Goals against
- GD = Goal difference
- Grp = Group stage
- GS2 = Second group stage
- Lge = League phase
- R1 = First round
- R2 = Second round
- R3 = Third round
- R4 = Fourth round
- R32 = Round of 32
- R16 = Round of 16
- QF = Quarter-finals
- SF = Semi-finals

Key to colours and symbols:

W	Winners
RU	Runners-up

Arsenal F.C. record in international football by season
Season	Competition	Pld	W	D	L	GF	GA	GD	Round
1963–64	Inter-Cities Fairs Cup	4	1	1	2	11	8	+3	R2
1969–70	Inter-Cities Fairs Cup	12	7	2	3	23	6	+17	W
1970–71	Inter-Cities Fairs Cup	8	4	2	2	12	5	+7	QF
1971–72	European Cup	6	4	0	2	13	4	+9	QF
1978–79	UEFA Cup	6	3	1	2	10	5	+5	R3
1979–80	European Cup Winners' Cup	9	4	5	0	13	5	+8	RU
1981–82	UEFA Cup	4	3	0	1	5	2	+3	R2
1982–83	UEFA Cup	2	0	0	2	4	8	−4	R1
1991–92	European Cup	4	1	1	2	8	6	+2	R2
1993–94	European Cup Winners' Cup	9	6	3	0	17	3	+14	W
1994	European Super Cup	2	0	1	1	0	2	−2	RU
1994–95	UEFA Cup Winners' Cup	9	5	2	2	18	12	+6	RU
1996–97	UEFA Cup	2	0	0	2	4	6	−2	R1
1997–98	UEFA Cup	2	0	1	1	1	2	−1	R1
1998–99	UEFA Champions League	6	2	2	2	8	8	0	Grp
1999–2000	UEFA Champions League	6	2	2	2	9	9	0	Grp
1999–2000	UEFA Cup	9	6	2	1	21	9	+12	RU
2000–01	UEFA Champions League	14	7	3	4	19	18	+1	QF
2001–02	UEFA Champions League	12	5	1	6	17	17	0	GS2
2002–03	UEFA Champions League	12	4	5	3	15	9	+6	GS2
2003–04	UEFA Champions League	10	5	2	3	16	11	+5	QF
2004–05	UEFA Champions League	8	3	4	1	13	9	+4	R16
2005–06	UEFA Champions League	13	8	4	1	15	4	+11	RU
2006–07	UEFA Champions League	10	5	3	2	13	6	+7	R16
2007–08	UEFA Champions League	12	7	3	2	24	9	+15	QF
2008–09	UEFA Champions League	14	7	3	4	23	11	+12	SF
2009–10	UEFA Champions League	12	7	2	3	26	14	+12	QF
2010–11	UEFA Champions League	8	5	0	3	21	11	+10	R16
2011–12	UEFA Champions League	10	6	2	2	13	11	+2	R16
2012–13	UEFA Champions League	8	4	1	3	13	11	+2	R16
2013–14	UEFA Champions League	10	6	1	3	14	8	+6	R16
2014–15	UEFA Champions League	10	6	2	2	19	11	+8	R16
2015–16	UEFA Champions League	8	3	0	5	13	15	−2	R16
2016–17	UEFA Champions League	8	4	2	2	20	16	+4	R16
2017–18	UEFA Europa League	14	8	3	3	31	13	+18	SF
2018–19	UEFA Europa League	15	11	1	3	30	13	+17	RU
2019–20	UEFA Europa League	8	4	2	2	16	9	+7	R32
2020–21	UEFA Europa League	14	9	3	2	33	13	+20	SF
2022–23	UEFA Europa League	8	5	2	1	11	6	+5	R16
2023–24	UEFA Champions League	10	5	2	3	19	8	+11	QF
2024–25	UEFA Champions League	14	9	2	3	31	10	+21	SF
2025–26	UEFA Champions League	15	11	4	0	30	7	+23	RU
2026–27	UEFA Champions League	3	2	1	0	6	2	+4	LP

=== By competition ===
As of match played 21 October 2026

Competition	Pld	W	D	L	GF	GA	GD	W%
Champions League / European Cup	243	128	52	63	418	245	+173	52.67
Cup Winners' Cup / European Cup Winners' Cup	27	15	10	2	48	20	+28	55.56
Europa League / UEFA Cup	84	49	15	20	165	85	+80	58.33
Inter-Cities Fairs Cup	24	12	5	7	46	19	+27	50.00
Super Cup / European Super Cup	2	0	1	1	0	2	−2	0.00
Total	380	204	83	93	677	371	+306	53.68

=== By country ===
As of match played 21 October 2026

Arsenal F.C. record in international football by country
Country (Note: The table excludes former nations such as East Germany and the Soviet Union.)	Pld	W	D	L	GF	GA	GD	Win%
Austria	6	4	0	2	14	5	+9	66.67
Azerbaijan	2	2	0	0	4	0	+4	100.00
Belarus	4	3	0	1	13	3	+10	75.00
Belgium	17	10	4	3	41	17	+24	58.82
Bulgaria	2	2	0	0	9	2	+7	100.00
Croatia	5	4	0	1	12	3	+9	80.00
Cyprus	2	2	0	0	6	1	+5	100.00
Czech Republic	11	9	2	0	30	3	+27	81.82
Denmark	6	3	2	1	16	9	+7	50.00
England	7	0	2	5	7	16	−9	0.00
France	34	19	8	7	52	23	+29	55.88
Germany	42	18	8	16	66	59	+7	42.86
Greece	23	12	3	8	35	24	+11	52.17
Italy	41	22	10	9	53	31	+22	53.66
Kazakhstan	1	1	0	0	3	2	+1	100.00
Netherlands	24	10	9	5	40	17	+23	41.67
Northern Ireland	2	1	0	1	3	1	+2	50.00
Norway	8	7	1	0	24	4	+20	87.50
Portugal	23	10	8	5	38	18	+20	43.48
Republic of Ireland	2	2	0	0	7	2	+5	100.00
Romania	4	4	0	0	12	2	+10	100.00
Russia	8	3	3	2	10	8	+2	37.50
Scotland	2	2	0	0	5	1	+4	100.00
Serbia	6	3	2	1	8	4	+4	50.00
Spain	47	20	11	16	68	54	+14	42.55
Sweden	6	4	1	1	15	2	+13	66.67
Switzerland	8	8	0	0	17	3	+14	100.00
Turkey	11	7	4	0	21	4	+17	63.64
Ukraine	13	7	2	4	23	17	+6	53.85

== List of matches ==
Season	Competition	Round	Opponent	Home	Away	Agg.
1963–64	Inter-Cities Fairs Cup	1R	(Denmark) Copenhagen XI	2–3	7–1	9–4
1963–64	Inter-Cities Fairs Cup	2R	(Belgium) RFC Liège	1–1	1–3	2–4
1969–70	Inter-Cities Fairs Cup	1R	(Northern Ireland) Glentoran	3–0	0–1	3–1
1969–70	Inter-Cities Fairs Cup	2R	(Portugal) Sporting CP	3–0	0–0	3–0
1969–70	Inter-Cities Fairs Cup	3R	(France) Rouen	1–0	0–0	1–0
1969–70	Inter-Cities Fairs Cup	QF	(Romania) Dinamo Bacău	7–1	2–0	9–1
1969–70	Inter-Cities Fairs Cup	SF	(Netherlands) Ajax	3–0	0–1	3–1
1969–70	Inter-Cities Fairs Cup	Final	(Belgium) Anderlecht	3–0	1–3	4–3
1970–71	Inter-Cities Fairs Cup	1R	(Italy) Lazio	2–0	0–0	2–0
1970–71	Inter-Cities Fairs Cup	2R	(Austria) Sturm Graz	2–0	0–1	2–1
1970–71	Inter-Cities Fairs Cup	3R	(Belgium) Beveren	4–0	0–0	4–0
1970–71	Inter-Cities Fairs Cup	QF	(Germany) 1. FC Köln	2–1	0–1	2–2 (a)
1971–72	European Cup	1R	(Norway) Strømsgodset	4–0	3–1	7–1
1971–72	European Cup	2R	(Switzerland) Grasshoppers	3–0	2–0	5–0
1971–72	European Cup	QF	(Netherlands) Ajax	0–1	1–2	1–3
1978–79	UEFA Cup	1R	(East Germany) Lokomotiv Leipzig	3–0	4–1	7–1
1978–79	UEFA Cup	2R	(Socialist Federal Republic of Yugoslavia) Hajduk Split	1–0	1–2	2–2 (a)
1978–79	UEFA Cup	3R	(Socialist Federal Republic of Yugoslavia) Red Star Belgrade	0–0	0–1	1–2
1979–80	Cup Winners' Cup	1R	(Turkey) Fenerbahçe	2–0	0–0	2–0
1979–80	Cup Winners' Cup	2R	(East Germany) 1. FC Magdeburg	2–1	2–2	4–3
1979–80	Cup Winners' Cup	QF	(Sweden) IFK Göteborg	5–1	0–0	5–1
1979–80	Cup Winners' Cup	SF	(Italy) Juventus	1–1	1–0	2–1
1979–80	Cup Winners' Cup	Final	(Spain) Valencia	0–0 (a.e.t.) (4–5 p) (N)		
1981–82	UEFA Cup	1R	(Greece) Panathinaikos	1–0	2–0	3–0
1981–82	UEFA Cup	2R	(Belgium) FC Winterslag	2–1	0–1	2–2 (a)
1982–83	UEFA Cup	1R	(Soviet Union) Spartak Moscow	2–5	2–3	4–8
1991–92	European Cup	1R	Austria Wien	6–1	0–1	6–2
1991–92	European Cup	2R	(Portugal) Benfica	0–1	1–1	1–2
1993–94	Cup Winners' Cup	1R	(Denmark) Odense	1–1	2–1	3–2
1993–94	Cup Winners' Cup	2R	(Belgium) Standard Liège	3–0	7–0	10–0
1993–94	Cup Winners' Cup	QF	(Italy) Torino	1–0	0–0	1–0
1993–94	Cup Winners' Cup	SF	(France) Paris Saint-Germain	1–0	1–1	2–1
1993–94	Cup Winners' Cup	Final	(Italy) Parma	1–0 (N)		
1994	European Super Cup	Final	(Italy) Milan	0–0	0–2	0–2
1994–95	Cup Winners' Cup	1R	(Cyprus) Omonia	3–0	3–1	6–1
1994–95	Cup Winners' Cup	2R	(Denmark) Brøndby	2–2	2–1	4–3
1994–95	Cup Winners' Cup	QF	(France) Auxerre	1–1	1–0	2–1
1994–95	Cup Winners' Cup	SF	(Italy) Sampdoria	3–2	2–3 (a.e.t.)	5–5 (3–2 p)
1994–95	Cup Winners' Cup	Final	(Spain) Zaragoza	1–2 (a.e.t.) (N)		
1996–97	UEFA Cup	R1	(Germany) Borussia Mönchengladbach	2–3	2–3	4–6
1997–98	UEFA Cup	R1	(Greece) PAOK	1–1	0–1	1–2
1998–99	Champions League	Group E	(Ukraine) Dynamo Kyiv	1–1	1–3	3rd out of 4
1998–99	Champions League	Group E	(France) Lens	0–1	1–1	3rd out of 4
1998–99	Champions League	Group E	(Greece) Panathinaikos	2–1	3–1	3rd out of 4
1999–2000	Champions League	Group B	(Spain) Barcelona	2–4	1–1	3rd out of 4
1999–2000	Champions League	Group B	(Italy) Fiorentina	0–1	0–0	3rd out of 4
1999–2000	Champions League	Group B	(Sweden) AIK	3–1	3–2	3rd out of 4
1999–2000	UEFA Cup	R3	(France) Nantes	3–0	3–3	6–3
1999–2000	UEFA Cup	R4	(Spain) Deportivo La Coruña	5–1	1–2	6–3
1999–2000	UEFA Cup	QF	(Germany) Werder Bremen	2–0	4–2	6–2
1999–2000	UEFA Cup	SF	(France) Lens	1–0	2–1	3–1
1999–2000	UEFA Cup	Final	(Turkey) Galatasaray	0–0 (a.e.t.) (1–4 p) (N)		
2000–01	Champions League	Group B	(Ukraine) Shakhtar Donetsk	3–2	0–3	1st out of 4
2000–01	Champions League	Group B	(Italy) Lazio	2–0	1–1	1st out of 4
2000–01	Champions League	Group B	(Czech Republic) Sparta Prague	4–2	1–0	1st out of 4
2000–01	Champions League	Group C2				
2000–01	Champions League	Group C2	(Germany) Bayern Munich	2–2	0–1	2nd out of 4
2000–01	Champions League	Group C2	(France) Lyon	0–0	1–0	2nd out of 4
2000–01	Champions League	Group C2	(Russia) Spartak Moscow	1–0	1–4	2nd out of 4
2000–01	Champions League	QF	(Spain) Valencia	2–1	0–1	2–2 (a)
2001–02	Champions League	Group C	(Spain) Mallorca	3–1	0–1	2nd out of 4
2001–02	Champions League	Group C	(Greece) Panathinaikos	2–1	0–1	2nd out of 4
2001–02	Champions League	Group C	(Germany) Schalke 04	3–2	1–3	2nd out of 4
2001–02	Champions League	Group D2	(Germany) Bayer Leverkusen	4–1	1–1	3rd out of 4
2001–02	Champions League	Group D2	(Spain) Deportivo La Coruña	0–2	0–2	3rd out of 4
2001–02	Champions League	Group D2	(Italy) Juventus	3–1	0–1	3rd out of 4
2002–03	Champions League	Group A	(Germany) Borussia Dortmund	2–0	1–2	1st out of 4
2002–03	Champions League	Group A	(France) Auxerre	2–1	0–1	1st out of 4
2002–03	Champions League	Group A	(Netherlands) PSV Eindhoven	0–0	4–0	1st out of 4
2002–03	Champions League	Group B2	(Spain) Valencia	0–0	1–2	3rd out of 4
2002–03	Champions League	Group B2	(Netherlands) Ajax	1–1	0–0	3rd out of 4
2002–03	Champions League	Group B2	(Italy) Roma	1–1	3–1	3rd out of 4
2003–04	Champions League	Group B	(Russia) Lokomotiv Moscow	2–0	0–0	1st out of 4
2003–04	Champions League	Group B	(Italy) Inter Milan	0–3	5–1	1st out of 4
2003–04	Champions League	Group B	(Ukraine) Dynamo Kyiv	1–0	1–2	1st out of 4
2003–04	Champions League	R16	(Spain) Celta Vigo	2–0	3–2	5–2
2003–04	Champions League	QF	(England) Chelsea	1–2	1–1	2–3
2004–05	Champions League	Group E	(Netherlands) PSV Eindhoven	1–0	1–1	1st out of 4
2004–05	Champions League	Group E	(Greece) Panathinaikos	1–1	2–2	1st out of 4
2004–05	Champions League	Group E	(Norway) Rosenborg	5–1	1–1	1st out of 4
2004–05	Champions League	R16	(Germany) Bayern Munich	1–0	1–3	2–3
2005–06	Champions League	Group B	(Netherlands) Ajax	0–0	2–1	1st out of 4
2005–06	Champions League	Group B	(Switzerland) Thun	2–1	1–0	1st out of 4
2005–06	Champions League	Group B	(Czech Republic) Sparta Prague	3–0	2–0	1st out of 4
2005–06	Champions League	R16	(Spain) Real Madrid	0–0	1–0	1–0
2005–06	Champions League	QF	(Italy) Juventus	2–0	0–0	2–0
2005–06	Champions League	SF	(Spain) Villarreal	1–0	0–0	1–0
2005–06	Champions League	Final	(Spain) Barcelona	1–2 (N)		
2006–07	Champions League					
2006–07	Champions League	3QR	(Croatia) Dinamo Zagreb	2–1	3–0	5–1
2006–07	Champions League	Group G	(Portugal) Porto	2–0	0–0	1st out of 4
2006–07	Champions League	Group G	(Russia) CSKA Moscow	0–0	0–1	1st out of 4
2006–07	Champions League	Group G	(Germany) Hamburger SV	3–1	2–1	1st out of 4
2006–07	Champions League	R16	(Netherlands) PSV Eindhoven	1–1	0–1	1–2
2007–08	Champions League	3QR	(Czech Republic) Sparta Prague	3–0	2–0	5–0
2007–08	Champions League	Group H	(Spain) Sevilla	3–0	1–3	2nd out of 4
2007–08	Champions League	Group H	(Czech Republic) Slavia Prague	7–0	0–0	2nd out of 4
2007–08	Champions League	Group H	(Romania) Steaua București	2–1	1–0	2nd out of 4
2007–08	Champions League	R16	(Italy) Milan	0–0	2–0	2–0
2007–08	Champions League	QF	(England) Liverpool	1–1	2–4	3–5
2008–09	Champions League					
2008–09	Champions League	3QR	(Netherlands) Twente	4–0	2–0	6–0
2008–09	Champions League	Group G	(Portugal) Porto	4–0	0–2	2nd out of 4
2008–09	Champions League	Group G	(Ukraine) Dynamo Kyiv	1–0	1–1	2nd out of 4
2008–09	Champions League	Group G	(Turkey) Fenerbahçe	0–0	5–2	2nd out of 4
2008–09	Champions League	R16	(Italy) Roma	1–0	0–1 (a.e.t.)	1–1 (7–6 p)
2008–09	Champions League	QF	(Spain) Villarreal	3–0	1–1	4–1
2008–09	Champions League	SF	(England) Manchester United	1–3	0–1	1–4
2009–10	Champions League	PO	(Scotland) Celtic	3–1	2–0	5–0
2009–10	Champions League	Group H	(Greece) Olympiacos	2–0	0–1	1st out of 4
2009–10	Champions League	Group H	(Belgium) Standard Liège	2–0	3–2	1st out of 4
2009–10	Champions League	Group H	(Netherlands) AZ	4–1	1–1	1st out of 4
2009–10	Champions League	R16	(Portugal) Porto	5–0	1–2	6–2
2009–10	Champions League	QF	(Spain) Barcelona	2–2	1–4	2–5
2010–11	Champions League					
2010–11	Champions League	Group H	(Ukraine) Shakhtar Donetsk	5–1	1–2	2nd out of 4
2010–11	Champions League	Group H	(Portugal) Braga	6–0	0–2	2nd out of 4
2010–11	Champions League	Group H	(Serbia) Partizan	3–1	3–1	2nd out of 4
2010–11	Champions League	R16	(Spain) Barcelona	2–1	1–3	3–4
2011–12	Champions League					
2011–12	Champions League	PO	(Italy) Udinese	1–0	2–1	3–1
2011–12	Champions League	Group E	(France) Marseille	0–0	1–0	1st out of 4
2011–12	Champions League	Group E	(Greece) Olympiacos	2–1	1–3	1st out of 4
2011–12	Champions League	Group E	(Germany) Borussia Dortmund	2–1	1–1	1st out of 4
2011–12	Champions League	R16	(Italy) Milan	3–0	0–4	3–4
2012–13	Champions League					
2012–13	Champions League	Group B	(Germany) Schalke 04	0–2	2–2	2nd out of 4
2012–13	Champions League	Group B	(Greece) Olympiacos	3–1	1–2	2nd out of 4
2012–13	Champions League	Group B	(France) Montpellier	2–0	2–1	2nd out of 4
2012–13	Champions League	R16	(Germany) Bayern Munich	1–3	2–0	3–3 (a)
2013–14	Champions League					
2013–14	Champions League	PO	(Turkey) Fenerbahçe	2–0	3–0	5–0
2013–14	Champions League	Group E	(Germany) Borussia Dortmund	1–2	1–0	2nd out of 4
2013–14	Champions League	Group E	(Italy) Napoli	2–0	0–2	2nd out of 4
2013–14	Champions League	Group E	(France) Marseille	2–0	2–1	2nd out of 4
2013–14	Champions League	R16	(Germany) Bayern Munich	0–2	1–1	1–3
2014–15	Champions League					
2014–15	Champions League	PO	(Turkey) Beşiktaş	1–0	0–0	1–0
2014–15	Champions League	Group B	(Germany) Borussia Dortmund	2–0	0–2	2nd out of 4
2014–15	Champions League	Group B	(Belgium) Anderlecht	3–3	2–1	2nd out of 4
2014–15	Champions League	Group B	(Turkey) Galatasaray	4–1	4–1	2nd out of 4
2014–15	Champions League	R16	(France) Monaco	1–3	2–0	3–3 (a)
2015–16	Champions League					
2015–16	Champions League	Group F	(Germany) Bayern Munich	2–0	1–5	2nd out of 4
2015–16	Champions League	Group F	(Greece) Olympiacos	2–3	3–0	2nd out of 4
2015–16	Champions League	Group F	(Croatia) Dinamo Zagreb	3–0	1–2	2nd out of 4
2015–16	Champions League	R16	(Spain) Barcelona	0–2	1–3	1–5
2016–17	Champions League					
2016–17	Champions League	Group A	(France) Paris Saint-Germain	2–2	1–1	1st out of 4
2016–17	Champions League	Group A	(Bulgaria) Ludogorets Razgrad	6–0	3–2	1st out of 4
2016–17	Champions League	Group A	(Switzerland) Basel	2–0	4–1	1st out of 4
2016–17	Champions League	R16	(Germany) Bayern Munich	1–5	1–5	2–10
2017–18	Europa League					
2017–18	Europa League	Group H	(Serbia) Red Star Belgrade	0–0	1–0	1st out of 4
2017–18	Europa League	Group H	(Germany) 1. FC Köln	3–1	0–1	1st out of 4
2017–18	Europa League	Group H	(Belarus) BATE Borisov	6–0	4–2	1st out of 4
2017–18	Europa League	R32	(Sweden) Östersund	1–2	3–0	4–2
2017–18	Europa League	R16	(Italy) Milan	3–1	2–0	5–1
2017–18	Europa League	QF	(Russia) CSKA Moscow	4–1	2–2	6–3
2017–18	Europa League	SF	(Spain) Atlético Madrid	1–1	0–1	1–2
2018–19	Europa League					
2018–19	Europa League	Group E	(Portugal) Sporting CP	0–0	1–0	1st out of 4
2018–19	Europa League	Group E	(Ukraine) Vorskla Poltava	4–2	2–0	1st out of 4
2018–19	Europa League	Group E	(Azerbaijan) Qarabağ	1–0	3–0	1st out of 4
2018–19	Europa League	R32	(Belarus) BATE Borisov	3–0	0–1	3–1
2018–19	Europa League	R16	(France) Rennes	3–0	1–3	4–3
2018–19	Europa League	QF	(Italy) Napoli	2–0	1–0	3–0
2018–19	Europa League	SF	(Spain) Valencia	3–1	4–2	7–3
2018–19	Europa League	Final	(England) Chelsea	1–4 (N)		
2019–20	Europa League					
2019–20	Europa League	Group F	(Germany) Eintracht Frankfurt	1–2	3–0	1st out of 4
2019–20	Europa League	Group F	(Belgium) Standard Liège	4–0	2–2	1st out of 4
2019–20	Europa League	Group F	(Portugal) Vitória de Guimarães	3–2	1–1	1st out of 4
2019–20	Europa League	R32	(Greece) Olympiacos	1–2 (a.e.t.)	1–0	2–2 (a)
2020–21	Europa League					
2020–21	Europa League	Group B	(Norway) Molde	4–1	3–0	1st out of 4
2020–21	Europa League	Group B	(Austria) Rapid Wien	4–1	2–1	1st out of 4
2020–21	Europa League	Group B	(Republic of Ireland) Dundalk	3–0	4–2	1st out of 4
2020–21	Europa League	R32	(Portugal) Benfica	3–2	1–1	4–3
2020–21	Europa League	R16	(Greece) Olympiacos	0–1	3–1	4–3
2020–21	Europa League	QF	(Czech Republic) Slavia Prague	1–1	4–0	3–0
2020–21	Europa League	SF	(Spain) Villarreal	0–0	1–2	1–2
2022–23	Europa League					
2022–23	Europa League	Group A	(Netherlands) PSV Eindhoven	1–0	0–2	1st out of 4
2022–23	Europa League	Group A	(Norway) Bodø/Glimt	3–0	1–0	1st out of 4
2022–23	Europa League	Group A	(Switzerland) Zürich	1–0	2–1	1st out of 4
2022–23	Europa League	R16	(Portugal) Sporting CP	1–1 (a.e.t.)	2–2	3–3 (3–5 p)
2023–24	Champions League					
2023–24	Champions League	Group B	(Netherlands) PSV Eindhoven	4–0	1–1	1st out of 4
2023–24	Champions League	Group B	(France) Lens	6–0	1–2	1st out of 4
2023–24	Champions League	Group B	(Spain) Sevilla	2–0	2–1	1st out of 4
2023–24	Champions League	R16	(Portugal) Porto	1–0 (a.e.t.)	0–1	1–1 (4–2 p)
2023–24	Champions League	QF	(Germany) Bayern Munich	2–2	0–1	2–3
2024–25	Champions League					
2024–25	Champions League	League phase	(Italy) Atalanta	—N/a	0–0	3rd out of 36
2024–25	Champions League	League phase	(France) Paris Saint-Germain	2–0	—N/a	3rd out of 36
2024–25	Champions League	League phase	(Ukraine) Shakhtar Donetsk	1–0	—N/a	3rd out of 36
2024–25	Champions League	League phase	(Italy) Inter Milan	—N/a	0–1	3rd out of 36
2024–25	Champions League	League phase	(Portugal) Sporting CP	—N/a	5–1	3rd out of 36
2024–25	Champions League	League phase	(France) Monaco	3–0	—N/a	3rd out of 36
2024–25	Champions League	League phase	(Croatia) Dinamo Zagreb	3–0	—N/a	3rd out of 36
2024–25	Champions League	League phase	(Spain) Girona	—N/a	2–1	3rd out of 36
2024–25	Champions League	R16	(Netherlands) PSV Eindhoven	2–2	7–1	9–3
2024–25	Champions League	QF	(Spain) Real Madrid	3–0	2–1	5–1
2024–25	Champions League	SF	(France) Paris Saint-Germain	0–1	1–2	1–3
2025–26	Champions League					
2025–26	Champions League	League phase	(Spain) Athletic Bilbao	—N/a	2–0	1st out of 36
2025–26	Champions League	League phase	(Greece) Olympiacos	2–0	—N/a	1st out of 36
2025–26	Champions League	League phase	(Spain) Atlético Madrid	4–0	—N/a	1st out of 36
2025–26	Champions League	League phase	(Czech Republic) Slavia Prague	—N/a	3–0	1st out of 36
2025–26	Champions League	League phase	(Germany) Bayern Munich	3–1	—N/a	1st out of 36
2025–26	Champions League	League phase	(Belgium) Club Brugge	—N/a	3–0	1st out of 36
2025–26	Champions League	League phase	(Italy) Inter Milan	—N/a	3–1	1st out of 36
2025–26	Champions League	League phase	(Kazakhstan) Kairat	3–2	—N/a	1st out of 36
2025–26	Champions League	R16	(Germany) Bayer Leverkusen	2–0	1–1	3–1
2025–26	Champions League	QF	(Portugal) Sporting CP	0–0	1–0	1–0
2025–26	Champions League	SF	(Spain) Atlético Madrid	1–0	1–1	2–1
2025–26	Champions League	Final	(France) Paris Saint-Germain	1–1 (a.e.t.) (3–4 p) (N)		
2026–27	Champions League					
2026–27	Champions League	League phase	(Italy) Napoli	—N/a	1–0	
2026–27	Champions League	League phase	(France) Lille	3–0	—N/a	
2026–27	Champions League	League phase	(Germany) Bayern Munich	—N/a	2–2	
2026–27	Champions League	League phase	(Czech Republic) Slavia Prague	—N/a		
2026–27	Champions League	League phase	(Germany) Borussia Dortmund		—N/a	
2026–27	Champions League	League phase	(Spain) Real Madrid		—N/a	
2026–27	Champions League	League phase	(Spain) Real Betis	—N/a		
2026–27	Champions League	League phase	(Azerbaijan) Sabah		—N/a	

== Honours ==
International honours of Arsenal F.C.
Honour	Titles	Years
Inter-Cities Fairs Cup	1	1970
European Cup Winners' Cup	1	1994
