= Jean Plaskie =

Belgian footballer

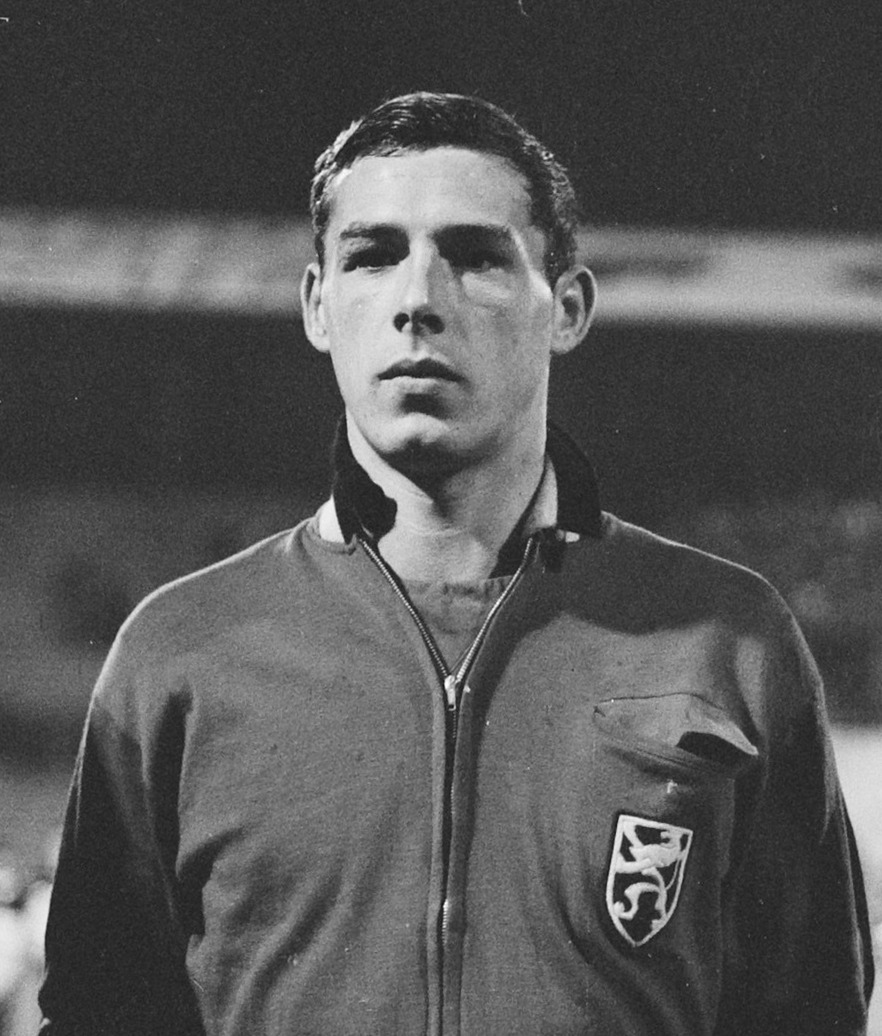
Jean Plaskie in 1964

Jean Plaskie (born 24 August 1941 in Brussels; died 18 September 2017) was a Belgian football player.

He played for R.S.C. Anderlecht and Belgium. He played in the match Belgium-Netherlands in 1964 with 10 fellows from the Anderlecht team after the substitution of goalkeeper Delhasse by Jean-Marie Trappeniers.
