= Alfons Peeters =

Belgian footballer

Personal information
- Full name: Alfons Peeters
- Date of birth: 21 January 1943
- Place of birth: Beringen, Belgium
- Date of death: 5 January 2015 (aged 71)
- Position: Midfielder

International career
Years	Team	Apps	(Gls)
1967–1968	Belgium	4	(0)

Alfons Peeters (21 January 1943 – 5 January 2015) was a Belgian footballer. During his career he played for R.S.C. Anderlecht. He earned 4 caps for the Belgium national football team, and participated in the 1970 FIFA World Cup.

== Honours ==
=== Player ===
RSC Anderlecht

- Inter-Cities Fairs Cup runners-up: 1969–70
