= Gérard Desanghere =

Belgian footballer

- Desanghere in 2008

Personal information
- Date of birth: 16 November 1947
- Place of birth: Diksmuide, Belgium
- Date of death: 17 April 2018 (aged 70)
- Place of death: Jette, Belgium
- Position: Defender

Senior career*
Years	Team	Apps	(Gls)
1969–1971	Anderlecht		
1971–1979	Racing White/RWDM		
1979–1983	Eendracht Aalst		
1983–84	Denderhoutem		

International career
1973	Belgium	1	(0)
- * Club domestic league appearances and goals

Gérard Desanghere (16 November 1947 – 17 April 2018) was a Belgian professional footballer who played as central defender for Anderlecht and RWDM, where he won a championship title. He later played for Eendracht Aalst and Denderhoutem.

== Honours ==
Anderlecht

- Inter-Cities Fairs Cup runner-up: 1969–70

RWD Molenbeek

- Belgian First Division: 1974–75
- Jules Pappaert Cup: 1975
- Amsterdam Tournament: 1975
