= Jean-Marie Trappeniers =

Belgian footballer (1942–2016)

Jean Trappeniers
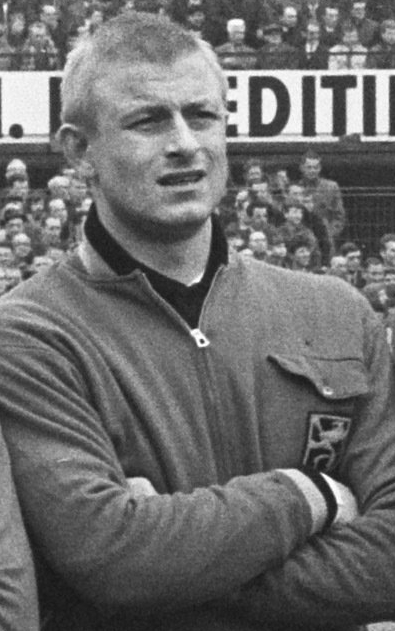
- Trappeniers in 1966

Personal information
- Full name: Jean-Marie Trappeniers
- Date of birth: 13 January 1942
- Place of birth: Vilvoorde, Belgium
- Date of death: 2 November 2016 (aged 74)
- Place of death: Belgium
- Position: Goalkeeper

Senior career*
| Years | Team | Apps | (Gls) |
| 1959–1971 | Anderlecht | | |
| 1971–1973 | Union Saint-Gilloise | | |
| 1973–1979 | Royal Antwerp | | |
| 1979–1981 | Eendracht Aalst | | |
| 1981–1982 | Union Saint-Gilloise | | |
| 1982–1983 | KFC Peutie | | |

International career
| 1964–1970 | Belgium | 11 | (0) |
- * Club domestic league appearances and goals

Jean-Marie Trappeniers (13 January 1942 – 2 November 2016) was a Belgian football goalkeeper. He played for Anderlecht and Belgium. In 1964, during a match Belgium-Netherlands, Trappeniers replaced Delhasse on the pitch to join 10 fellows from Anderlecht playing under the national team kit Later in his career, he also played for Union Saint-Gilloise, Royal Antwerp and Eendracht Aalst.

Trappeniers died on 2 November 2016.

== Honours ==
Anderlecht

- Belgian First Division: 1961–62, 1963–64, 1964–65, 1965–66, 1966–67, 1967–68
- Belgian Cup: 1964–65
- Inter-Cities Fairs Cup runner-up: 1969–70
