= 1966–67 Belgian First Division =

64th season of top-tier football in Belgium

Belgian First Division
- Season: 1966–67

Statistics of Belgian First Division in the 1966–67 season.

== Overview ==
Location of teams in Belgian First Division 1966–67

It was contested by 16 teams, and R.S.C. Anderlecht won the championship.

== League standings ==
Pos	Team	Pld	W	D	L	GF	GA	GD	Pts	Qualification or relegation
1	R.S.C. Anderlecht	30	20	7	3	63	12	+51	47	Qualified for 1967–68 European Cup
2	Club Brugge K.V.	30	21	3	6	62	33	+29	45	Qualified for 1967–68 Inter-Cities Fairs Cup
3	R.F.C. de Liège	30	16	7	7	43	27	+16	39	Qualified for 1967–68 Inter-Cities Fairs Cup
4	Standard Liège	30	15	7	8	50	34	+16	37	Qualified for 1967–68 European Cup Winners' Cup
5	Royal Antwerp FC	30	11	10	9	34	27	+7	32	Qualified for 1967–68 Inter-Cities Fairs Cup
6	K. Sint-Truidense V.V.	30	12	7	11	43	41	+2	31	
7	K.S.V. Waregem	30	9	12	9	28	27	+1	30	
8	Daring Club Bruxelles	30	8	11	11	41	47	−6	27	
9	Lierse S.K.	30	9	8	13	34	39	−5	26	
10	Beerschot	30	9	8	13	47	55	−8	26	
11	Beringen FC	30	7	12	11	43	46	−3	26	
12	KV Mechelen	30	7	12	11	36	45	−9	26	
13	Racing White	30	7	11	12	35	48	−13	25	
14	R. Charleroi S.C.	30	7	11	12	32	49	−17	25	
15	La Gantoise	30	7	8	15	31	56	−25	22	Relegated to Belgian Second Division
16	R.F.C. Tilleur-Saint-Nicolas	30	6	4	20	26	62	−36	16	Relegated to Belgian Second Division

== Results ==
Home \ Away	AND	ANT	BEE	BER	CLU	CHA	DAR	GNT	FCL	LIE	MAL	RRW	STA	STV	TIL	WAR
Anderlecht		0–0	2–0	5–0	3–0	2–0	5–0	3–0	1–0	4–1	2–2	3–0	0–0	0–0	2–0	1–0
Antwerp	0–2		1–1	0–2	0–1	0–2	3–1	0–1	1–1	2–0	3–1	2–2	1–1	3–0	2–0	1–1
Beerschot	0–0	1–3		4–0	3–6	4–2	2–0	4–1	1–4	0–1	1–1	1–1	2–1	5–2	4–1	0–0
Beringen	0–2	1–2	0–1		1–2	1–1	1–2	1–1	4–1	0–4	4–0	2–2	2–1	4–2	4–0	0–0
Club Brugge	1–2	1–2	2–1	3–2		5–1	2–1	3–1	1–1	3–1	1–0	4–0	4–2	2–0	2–0	1–0
Charleroi	0–7	1–1	1–1	2–2	0–1		1–1	0–0	0–0	2–0	2–2	1–0	1–0	2–0	5–0	3–2
Daring Club	2–3	1–0	4–0	2–2	3–1	1–1		2–2	0–1	1–0	2–0	1–1	3–2	1–4	3–0	1–2
La Gantoise	2–1	2–2	1–2	1–1	0–2	1–0	3–1		0–1	3–2	1–3	2–1	0–3	0–2	2–1	2–2
Liège	0–0	1–0	1–1	1–3	1–0	0–1	2–0	5–1		2–0	3–0	1–0	1–0	2–0	2–1	1–2
Lierse	0–2	1–0	0–0	0–0	0–3	4–0	0–0	3–0	1–2		0–0	2–2	1–1	1–0	5–0	1–1
Mechelen	0–2	0–0	2–0	1–1	1–1	1–1	2–2	1–1	2–1	1–3		2–0	3–2	1–1	2–0	0–1
Racing White	0–7	2–0	5–3	2–2	1–4	2–0	2–2	2–0	0–3	0–0	0–2		0–0	1–0	3–0	4–0
Standard Liège	2–0	2–0	5–1	3–2	3–1	3–2	0–0	4–2	0–2	3–0	3–2	0–0		4–3	1–0	2–1
Sint-Truiden	1–0	0–1	4–2	0–0	2–2	3–1	2–2	0–0	1–1	3–0	4–2	2–1	1–0		4–2	1–0
Tilleur	0–1	0–2	3–2	0–2	1–2	3–1	2–2	3–1	1–1	2–3	1–1	2–1	0–1	1–0		2–1
Waregem	1–1	0–0	1–0	1–1	0–1	0–0	1–0	1–0	5–1	2–0	2–1	0–0	1–1	0–1	0–0	

Legend: Blue = home team win; Yellow = draw; Red = away team win.
