= 1965–66 Belgian First Division =

63rd season of top-tier football in Belgium

Belgian First Division
- Season: 1965–66

Statistics of Belgian First Division in the 1965–66 season.

== Overview ==
Location of teams in Belgian First Division 1965–66

It was contested by 16 teams, and R.S.C. Anderlecht won the championship.

== League standings ==
Pos	Team	Pld	W	D	L	GF	GA	GD	Pts	Qualification or relegation
1	R.S.C. Anderlecht	30	21	5	4	88	18	+70	47	Qualified for 1966–67 European Cup
2	K. Sint-Truidense V.V.	30	18	4	8	43	29	+14	40	
3	Standard Liège	30	16	8	6	47	24	+23	40	Qualified for 1966–67 European Cup Winners' Cup
4	Beerschot	30	15	9	6	45	29	+16	39	
5	Club Brugge K.V.	30	12	11	7	56	39	+17	35	
6	KV Mechelen	30	13	7	10	35	39	−4	33	
7	La Gantoise	30	11	8	11	47	62	−15	30	Qualified for 1966–67 Inter-Cities Fairs Cup
8	R.F.C. Tilleur-Saint-Nicolas	30	9	12	9	30	37	−7	30	
9	R.F.C. de Liège	30	11	7	12	52	46	+6	29	Qualified for 1966–67 Inter-Cities Fairs Cup
10	Royal Antwerp FC	30	11	7	12	43	44	−1	29	Qualified for 1966–67 Inter-Cities Fairs Cup
11	Lierse S.K.	30	8	10	12	30	40	−10	26	
12	Racing White	30	8	8	14	36	47	−11	24	
13	Daring Club Bruxelles	30	7	10	13	25	31	−6	24	
14	Beringen FC	30	7	6	17	29	51	−22	20	
15	K Berchem Sport	30	4	10	16	24	52	−28	18	Relegated to Belgian Second Division
16	Cercle Brugge K.S.V.	30	5	6	19	19	61	−42	16	Relegated to Belgian Second Division

== Results ==
Home \ Away	AND	ANT	BEE	BRC	BER	CER	CLU	DAR	GNT	FCL	LIE	MAL	RRW	STA	STV	TIL
Anderlecht		1–1	0–2	3–0	2–1	12–0	3–1	5–0	6–0	4–0	2–0	7–1	2–0	1–1	6–0	3–0
Antwerp	0–5		1–2	3–0	2–0	3–1	1–4	1–0	3–2	1–1	0–0	2–0	2–3	1–3	2–0	2–1
Beerschot	1–1	2–1		0–0	2–0	2–0	2–2	1–0	5–0	3–2	0–1	1–0	1–1	1–0	1–0	2–1
Berchem Sport	0–3	1–1	1–1		0–0	0–0	0–0	1–1	3–1	1–3	0–1	1–2	1–1	2–0	0–0	3–3
Beringen	0–3	1–2	2–1	0–2		3–0	1–1	0–0	4–1	1–0	4–1	0–1	2–1	0–3	1–1	1–2
Cercle Brugge	0–2	1–4	1–0	2–0	3–2		2–2	1–0	1–2	1–2	0–0	0–0	0–1	1–0	0–1	0–0
Club Brugge	0–1	4–2	1–2	1–0	1–1	2–1		0–0	1–1	2–1	5–0	2–0	4–3	1–2	3–2	1–1
Daring Club	0–0	2–1	2–1	5–0	0–0	3–1	1–1		2–3	2–0	1–1	0–0	0–0	1–0	1–2	1–2
La Gantoise	2–2	1–0	2–2	3–0	2–1	1–1	3–5	1–0		0–5	1–1	2–3	2–1	1–1	2–0	4–0
Liège	3–7	0–0	1–3	6–1	5–0	5–0	0–0	1–0	2–1		0–4	2–2	1–2	0–1	2–3	0–0
Lierse	2–1	1–1	1–2	2–1	0–1	5–0	0–3	2–1	1–2	1–3		1–2	1–1	1–2	0–1	1–1
Mechelen	0–2	1–0	2–2	2–1	2–0	1–0	1–5	1–0	0–3	6–2	0–0		2–0	1–1	0–0	3–1
Racing White	0–3	1–3	1–1	1–2	3–0	3–1	3–2	0–1	6–1	0–4	0–0	1–0		1–1	1–4	0–0
Standard Liège	0–1	2–2	2–1	3–2	4–0	3–1	2–0	2–0	1–1	0–0	4–0	1–0	1–0		1–1	1–3
Sint-Truiden	2–0	2–0	2–0	3–1	5–3	1–0	1–0	3–1	4–1	0–1	0–1	1–0	2–0	0–1		1–0
Tilleur	1–0	2–1	1–1	1–0	1–0	1–0	2–2	0–0	1–1	0–0	1–1	1–2	3–1	0–4	0–1	

Legend: Blue = home team win; Yellow = draw; Red = away team win.
