= Deaths in November 1997 =

The following is a list of notable deaths in November 1997.

Entries for each day are listed alphabetically by surname. A typical entry lists information in the following sequence:

- Name, age, country of citizenship at birth, subsequent country of citizenship (if applicable), reason for notability, cause of death (if known), and reference.

== November 1997 ==
=== 1 ===
- Wolfgang Abel, 92, Austrian anthropologist and Nazi racial biologist.
- Jon-Henri Damski, 60, American essayist, columnist, poet, and gay rights activist, cancer.
- Bill Dunn, 82, Australian rules footballer.
- Serge Hutin, 70, French author of books on esoterica and the occult.
- Ravil Khabutdinov, 68, Soviet Russian weightlifter and Olympian (1956).
- Gérard Légaré, 89, Canadian politician, member of the House of Commons of Canada (1953-1958, 1962-1963).
- Roger Marche, 73, French football player.
- Bruno Michaud, 62, Swiss footballer and manager.
- Victor Mills, 100, American chemical engineer for the Procter & Gamble company.
- Cullen Rogers, 76, American gridiron football player (Pittsburgh Steelers).

=== 2 ===
- Ken Cooper, 74, American football player (Baltimore Colts), and coach.
- Edmond Adolphe de Rothschild, 71, French-Swiss banker, emphysema.
- Ayya Khema, 74, German-American Buddhist teacher, breast cancer.
- Roy McMillan, 68, American baseball player (Cincinnati Reds, Milwaukee Braves, New York Mets), coach and manager.
- Helen Stevenson Meyner, 68, American politician, member of the United States House of Representatives (1975-1979).
- Maulana Habibullah Mukhtar, 53, Pakistani Islamic scholar and writer.
- Shōshin Nagamine, 90, Japanese karate Master, mayor and author.
- Gerhard Neumann, 80, German-American aviation engineer, leukemia.
- Tony Novis, 91, English rugby football player.
- Harold Plenderleith, 99, Scottish art conservator and archaeologist.
- Bernhard Plettner, 82, German engineer and manager.
- Clarence Schmidt, 72, American ice hockey player (Boston Bruins).
- Carson Smith, 66, American jazz double-bassist.
- G. Harry Stine, 69, American writer and science fiction author, stroke.

=== 3 ===
- Herbert Albrecht, 72, German Olympic wrestler (1960).
- Maxime Bousselaire, 96, French Olympic shot putter (1924).
- Wally Bruner, 66, American journalist and television host, liver cancer.
- Attilio Conton, 95, Italian Olympic long-distance runner (1928).
- Antoine Cuissard, 73, French football player and manager.
- Vladimir Guliayev, 73, Soviet actor of theater and cinema.
- Ashot Navasardyan, 47, Armenian politician and military commander, heart attack.
- Edward Dean Price, 78, American district judge (United States District Court for the Eastern District of California).
- Satyapramoda Tirtha, Indian guru and philosopher.
- Farpi Vignoli, 90, Italian sculptor.

=== 4 ===
- Noboru Aota, 72, Japanese baseball player, lung cancer.
- George Chambers, 69, Prime Minister of Trinidad and Tobago.
- René-Jean Clot, 84, French painter and novelist.
- Wilfred Coutts, 89, Australian politician.
- Johnny Dickshot, 87, American baseball player (Pittsburgh Pirates, New York Giants, Chicago White Sox).
- Ranesh Das Gupta, 85, Bangladeshi writer, journalist and politician.
- Richard Hooker, 73, American surgeon and writer, leukemia.
- Denver Mills, 72, American football player (Chicago Cardinals).

=== 5 ===
- James Robert Baker, 50, American novelist and screenwriter, suicide by asphyxiation.
- Yemane Baria, 48, Eritrean singer-songwriter.
- Bae Hee-han, 90, Korean master carpenter
- Sir Isaiah Berlin, 88, Russian-born British social and political theorist, philosopher and historian.
- Harry Blade, 28, St Kilda punk legend
- Louise Campbell, 86, American actress.
- Camilla Cederna, 86, Italian writer and editor, cancer.
- Peter Jackson, 33, Australian rugby league footballer, drug overdose.
- Philip Roberts, 91, British Army officer.
- William C. Watson, 59, American actor.

=== 6 ===
- Luigi Cantone, 80, Italian Olympic fencer (1948).
- Norbert Carbonnaux, 79, French film director and screenwriter.
- Ray Daniel, 69, Welsh football player and manager.
- Jahangir Forouhar, 81, Iranian actor.
- Leon Forrest, 60, American novelist.
- Annie Llewelyn-Davies, Baroness Llewelyn-Davies of Hastoe, 82, British politician and peer, cerebrovascular disease, bronchopneumonia.
- Anne Stine Ingstad, 79, Norwegian archaeologist.
- Willi Klein, 70, German Olympic alpine skier (1952).
- Lajos Kovács, 61, Hungarian Olympic middle-distance runner (1960).
- Lillian Rogers Parks, 100, American housemaid and seamstress in the White House.
- Josef Pieper, 93, German Catholic philosopher.
- Epic Soundtracks, 38, British musician, drug overdose.
- Jane Thurgood-Dove, 34, Australian murder victim, shot.

=== 7 ===
- Lloyd Hamilton Donnell, 102, American mechanical engineer.
- Clyde Gilmour, 85, Canadian broadcaster and journalist
- Margaret Harshaw, 88, American opera singer and voice teacher.
- Bae Hee-han, 90, Korean master carpenter
- Rafael Hernández, 69, Spanish film actor.
- Allan Jinks, 83, Australian cricketer.
- Mitchell P. Kobelinski, 69, American banker and attorney.
- Paul Ricard, 88, French industrialist and creator of Pernod Ricard.

=== 8 ===
- Henry Bland, 87, Australian public servant.
- Lam Ching-ying, 44, Hong Kong stuntman and actor, liver cancer.
- Prosper Depredomme, 79, Belgian racing cyclist.
- Mohammad-Ali Jamalzadeh, 105, Iranian author.
- Robert John Kerr, Northern Irish loyalist, vapour explosion.
- Fedir Medvid, 54, Ukrainian and Soviet football player.
- Reggie Myles, 72-73, Irish Olympic sprinter (1948).
- Michael Ward, 88, English actor.

=== 9 ===
- Imre Beták, 74, Hungarian Olympic cross-country skier (1948).
- Paul Haghedooren, 38, Belgian cyclist, heart attack.
- Carl Gustav Hempel, 92, German writer and philosopher, pneumonia.
- Helenio Herrera, 87, French-Argentine football player and manager.
- Leonard Matthews, 83, British publisher and editor.
- Joe Roccisano, 58, American jazz saxophonist and arranger.
- Moody Sarno, 83, American football player and coach.
- Cecil Smith, 89, Canadian figure skater and Olympian (1924, 1928).
- Wu Xiuquan, 89, Chinese communist revolutionary, military officer, and diplomat.

=== 10 ===
- Lloyd Cardwell, 84, American football player (Detroit Lions), and coach.
- Leon W. Johnson, 93, United States Air Force general, respiratory infection.
- Ave Ninchi, 82, Italian actress.
- Tommy Tedesco, 67, American guitarist and studio musician, lung cancer.
- Carl Vinciquerra, 83, American Olympic boxer (1936).
- Annie Dodge Wauneka, 87, American Navajo Nation activist.

=== 11 ===
- William Alland, 81, American film producer (Creature from the Black Lagoon, It Came from Outer Space) and actor (Citizen Kane), complications from heart disease.
- Max Bangerter, 86, Swiss gymnast.
- Sammy Haynes, 77, American baseball player.
- Shake Keane, 70, Vincentian jazz musician and poet, stomach cancer.
- Lucien Xavier Michel-Andrianarahinjaka, 67, Malagasy writer, poet and politician.
- Rod Milburn, 47, American athlete and Olympian (1972), work-related accident.
- Gintaras Ramonas, 35, Lithuanian politician.
- Menahem Max Schiffer, 86, German-American mathematician.

=== 12 ===
- Luke Brown, 62, American professional wrestler known as Luke "Big Boy" Brown, stroke.
- Alberto Cavallone, 59, Italian film director and screenwriter.
- Tom Chang, 31, Taiwanese singer, songwriter, and music producer.
- James Laughlin, 83, American poet and literary book publisher, complications following a stroke.
- William Matthews, 55, American poet and essayist.
- Cecil F. Poole, 83, American judge.
- Rainer Ptacek, 46, American guitarist and singer-songwriter, brain tumor.
- Carola Standertskjöld, 56, Finnish jazz and pop singer, Alzheimer's disease.
- Carlos Surinach, 82, Spanish-American composer.
- Sándor Szabó, 82, Hungarian actor.
- Maria von Maltzan, 88, German noblewoman and resistance member during World War II.
- Howard Weiss, 80, American gridiron football player (Detroit Lions).

=== 13 ===
- André Boucourechliev, 72, Bulgarian-French composer.
- Alexandru Bârlădeanu, 86, Romanian Marxian economist.
- Bill Conroy, 82, American baseball player (Philadelphia Athletics, Boston Red Sox).
- James Couttet, 76, French alpine skier and ski jumper and Olympian (1948, 1952).
- Dietrich Lohmann, 54, German cinematographer, leukemia.
- Onzy Matthews, 67, American jazz musician and actor, heart failure.
- Mike McMichael, 82, American basketball player.
- P. Ravindran, 74, Indian politician.
- Larry Shinoda, 67, American automotive designer, kidney failure.
- Moe Thacker, 63, American baseball player (Chicago Cubs, St. Louis Cardinals).
- Al Weston, 91, American baseball player (Boston Braves).

=== 14 ===
- Knud Andersen, 75, Danish Olympic cyclist (1948, 1952).
- Eddie Arcaro, 81, American jockey, liver cancer.
- Alba de Céspedes, 86, Cuban-Italian writer.
- Joel Lee Brenner, 85, American mathematician.
- Stefan Lorant, 96, Hungarian-American filmmaker, photojournalist, and author.
- Jack Pickersgill, 92, Canadian civil servant and politician.
- Kiyoshi Saitō, 90, Japanese printmaker.
- N. V. N. Somu, 60, Indian politician, helicopter crash.
- Reena Virk, 14, Canadian murder victim, homicide by drowning.

=== 15 ===
- Aaron Brown, 53, American football player (Kansas City Chiefs, Green Bay Packers), traffic collision.
- Saul Chaplin, 85, American composer and musical director, complication from a fall.
- Alf Day, 90, Welsh professional footballer.
- Coen van Vrijberghe de Coningh, 47, Dutch actor, musician, composer, and television presenter, heart attack.
- Warren Douglas, 86, American actor and screenwriter, heart failure.
- Frank Griffiths, 86, Australian rugby league footballer.
- Jim Kepner, 74, American journalist, author, archivist and gay rights activist.
- Elizza La Porta, 95, Romanian-American film actress.
- John Lyttle, 66, Irish Olympic boxer (1952).
- Douglas MacArthur II, 88, American diplomat.
- George Mattson, 88, American Olympic rower (1932).
- Vladimir Vengerov, 77, Soviet and Russian film director.
- Nándor Wagner, 75, Hungarian artist and sculptor.

=== 16 ===
- Albert L. Ireland, 79, United States Marine Corps sergeant and recipient of nine purple hearts.
- José Behra, 73, French racing driver and rally driver.
- Captain Mikey, 62, American disc jockey and voice-over actor, leukemia.
- Brigitte Groh, 31, German Olympic figure skater (1988).
- Wilhelm Hayden, 71, Norwegian Olympic rower (1952).
- Georges Marchais, 77, French politician, heart attack.
- Russ Meyer, 74, American baseball player.
- Padmapriya, Indian actress.
- George O. Petrie, 85, American radio and television actor, lymphoma.
- Aaron John Sharp, 93, American botanist and bryologist.
- Roy Sheffield, 90, English cricket player.
- Robert N. Thompson, 83, Canadian politician and chiropractor.

=== 17 ===
- Richard Sumner Cowan, 76, American botanist, brain trauma.
- Pat Grace, 73, Australian rules footballer.
- Gary Herford, 57, Australian rower and Olympian (1964).
- Gert Günther Hoffmann, 68, German actor and director.
- David Ignatow, 83, American poet.
- Wilfred Josephs, 70, English composer.
- Headley Keith, 70, South African cricketer.
- Edwin Mansfield, 67, American academic, cancer.
- Orlando Ribeiro, 86, Portuguese geographer and historian.
- John Wimber, 63, American Christian leader, mystic and musician, brain hemorrhage.
- Milič Čapek, 88, Czech–American philosopher.

=== 18 ===
- Kay Curley Bennett, about 75, Native American artist and writer
- John Bird, 71, British politician.
- Josephine Cheesman, 87, British painter.
- Dame Jean Conan Doyle, 84, British Royal Air Force officer, Parkinson's disease.
- Unichi Hiratsuka, 102, Japanese printmaker.
- Fredrik Horn, 81, Norwegian Olympic football player (1936).
- Stanislav Rapotec, 86, Slovene-Australian artist.
- Sigfrid Roos, 89, Swedish footballer.
- Robert Vandeputte, 89, Belgian economist, civil servant, and politician.
- Joyce Wethered, 96, British golfer.

=== 19 ===
- Mary Bernheim, 95, British biochemist.
- Charles de Graft Dickson, 84, Ghanaian educationist and a politician.
- Gwendolyn Wilson Fowler, 89, American pharmacist.
- András Gergely, 81, Hungarian ice hockey player and Olympian (1936).
- Bernard Lenoble, 95, French footballer.
- Yosef Rom, 65, Israeli engineer and politician.
- Alfred Roome, 88, English film editor.
- Kjell Schou-Andreassen, 57, Norwegian footballer and manager, leukemia.

=== 20 ===
- Asbjørn Aavik, 94, Norwegian lutheran missionary and writer.
- Zack Clayton, 84, American baseball and basketball player.
- Larry Ferrari, 65, American organist, leukemia.
- Dick Littlefield, 71, American baseball player.
- Robert Palmer, 52, American writer, musician and blues producer, liver disease.

=== 21 ===
- Bill Boyd, 91, American poker player.
- Ismail Fahmi, 75, Egyptian diplomat and politician.
- Harold Geneen, 87, American businessman.
- Julian Jaynes, 77, American psychologist.
- Grayson L. Kirk, 94, American political scientist.
- Valter Lundgren, 80, Swedish footballer.
- Emilio Malchiodi, 75, Argentine Olympic athlete (1948).
- Jack Purvis, 60, English actor (Star Wars, Time Bandits, Brazil).
- Robert Simpson, 76, English composer.
- Antonio Yanakis, 75, Canadian politician, member of the House of Commons of Canada (1965-1984).

=== 22 ===
- Roger Brown, 55, American artist and painter.
- Willy Evensen, 78, Norwegian Olympic rower (1948).
- Michael Hutchence, 37, Australian musician (INXS), suicide by hanging.
- Joanna Moore, 63, American film and television actress, lung cancer.
- Kalki Sadasivam, 95, Indian freedom fighter, singer, journalist and film producer.

=== 23 ===
- Hulda Crooks, 101, American mountaineer.
- Ivan Ðurić, 50, Serbian writer, professor, historian and politician, suicide.
- Henry Wilson, Baron Wilson of Langside, 81, Scottish lawyer and politician.
- Robert Lewis, 88, American actor, director and author, heart failure.
- Irene E. Ryan, 88, American geologist, aviator and legislator.
- Oddvar Vargset, 72, Norwegian Olympic wrestler (1956).

=== 24 ===
- Barbara, 67, French singer, respiratory problems.
- Jorge Mas Canosa, 58, Cuban-American immigrant and anti-Castro lobbyist, lung cancer.
- Maurits Gysseling, 78, Belgian linguist.
- Bill Lawrie, 63, Australian racing cyclist.
- John Sopinka, 64, Ukrainian-Canadian lawyer and judge.
- Ira Wolfert, 89, American Pulitzer Prize-winning war correspondent and writer.

=== 25 ===
- Hastings Banda, 91 or 99, President of Malawi (1966–1994).
- Cathee Dahmen, 52, American model, chronic obstructive pulmonary disease.
- James H. Ellis, 73, British engineer and cryptographer.
- Eustace Fannin, 82, South African tennis player.
- Charles Hallahan, 54, American actor (The Thing, Hunter, Dante's Peak), heart attack.
- Vilmos Iváncsó, 58, Hungarian Olympic volleyball player (1964).
- Viorel Mateianu, 59, Romanian football player and coach.
- Stephen L.R. McNichols, 83, American politician, heart failure.
- Elmore Morgenthaler, 75, American basketball player (Providence Steamrollers, Philadelphia Warriors), pneumonia.
- M. Prabhakar Reddy, Indian film actor.
- Fenton Robinson, 62, American blues singer, brain cancer.
- Jon Silkin, 66, British poet.

=== 26 ===
- Rudolf Buhse, 92, German Wehrmacht officer and Bundeswehr general.
- Erna Fentsch, 88, German actress and screenwriter.
- Marguerite Henry, 95, American children's author.
- Werner Höfer, 84, German journalist.
- Sydney Herbert Thompson, 77, Canadian politician, member of the House of Commons of Canada (1957-1958).

=== 27 ===
- David D Barron, 33, Mexican gang member, friendly fire.
- Jules Henriet, 79, Belgian football player.
- Eduardo Kingman, 84, Ecuadorian artist.
- Malcolm Knowles, 84, American adult educator, stroke.
- Eric Laithwaite, 76, British electrical engineer.
- Buck Leonard, 90, American Hall of Fame baseball player.
- Ronald Martland, 90, Canadian lawyer and judge.
- Paul Masterson, 82, American baseball player (Philadelphia Phillies).
- Gull-Maj Norin, 84, Danish actress.
- Yves Prévost, 89, Canadian politician.
- Branko Ružić, 78, Croatian painter and sculptor.
- Merike Talve, 40, Canadian curator, artist and writer, breast cancer.

=== 28 ===
- Qemal Butka, Albanian architect, painter and politician.
- Wallace H. Clark, Jr., American dermatologist and pathologist, ruptured aneurysm.
- Tom Evenson, 87, English long-distance runner and Olympian (1932, 1936).
- Georges Marchal, 77, French actor.
- Ken Mitsuda, 95, Japanese film actor, stroke.
- Sune Skagerling, 78, Swedish Olympic bobsledder (1956).
- William "Smitty" Smith, 53, Canadian keyboardist and session musician.

=== 29 ===
- Ernest Johnson, 85, British Olympic track cyclist (1932, 1936).
- Isabelle M. Kelley, 80, American social worker.
- Abdul Latif, 46, Indian criminal, shot.
- Ada Leonard, 82, American bandleader.
- Heikki Savolainen, 90, Finnish artistic gymnast and Olympian (1928, 1932, 1936, 1948, 1952).
- George Sodeinde Sowemimo, 77, Nigerian jurist and Chief Justice.
- Coleman Young, 79, American politician, emphysema.

=== 30 ===
- Kathy Acker, 50, American experimental novelist, playwright and essayist, cancer.
- Bernie Creger, 70, American baseball player (St. Louis Cardinals).
- Glyn Dearman, 57, English actor, fall.
- Mary Fergusson, 83, British civil engineer.
- Kay Green, 70, Welsh cricket player.
- Arne Preben Jensen, 65, Danish Olympic equestrian (1960).
- Karl Kowanz, 71, Austrian football player, coach, and Olympian (1948).
- Sami Al Lenqawi, 25, Kuwaiti football player and Olympian (1992).
- Alfred Næss, 70, Norwegian playwright and songwriter.
- Leo Edward O'Neil, 69, American prelate of the Roman Catholic Church, multiple myeloma.
- Françoise Prévost, 67, French actress, journalist and author, breast cancer.
- Shamo Quaye, 26, Ghanaian football player and Olympian (1992).
- Hank Rockwell, 80, American football player (Cleveland Rams).
- Božena Srncová, 72, Czech Olympic gymnast (1948, 1952).
- Bernardo Élis, 82, Brazilian lawyer, professor, poet, and writer.
