= Joo-hwan =

- Hangul: 주환
- RR: Juhwan
- MR: Chuhwan

Joo-hwan, also spelled Ju-hwan, is a Korean given name.

People with this name include:

- Lee Ju-hwan (1952–1972), South Korean traditional musician
- Kim Ju-hwan (footballer, born 1982)
- Kim Ju-hwan (footballer, born 2001)
- Jason Kim (director) (born Kim Ju-hwan, 1981), South Korean film director and screenwriter
- Lim Ju-hwan (born 1982), South Korean actor
- Choi Joo-hwan (born 1988), South Korean baseball player
- Kim Ju-whan, South Korean dentist, member of the National Academy of Sciences of the Republic of Korea
- Oh Juhwan, South Korean guitarist, member of Eastern Sidekick
- On (born Choi Ju-hwan, 2002), South Korean singer, member of T1419

== See also ==
- List of Korean given names
