= Han Young-suk =

Han young-suk 한영숙 [ 韓英淑 ].

Han Young-suk (Korean: 한영숙; Hanja: 韓英淑; February 2, 1920 – October 8, 1990), was an Ingan-munhwage for the Seungmu and Hakmu, which is an Important Intangible Cultural Properties of Korea. She was designated on July 4, 1969. She was a master of Korean dance especially Seungmu, Hakmu, Taepyeongmu and Salpuri. She used Byeoksa (Korean: 벽사; Hanja: 碧史) as a pseudonym.

== Biography ==
Han Young-suk was born on February 2, 1920, in Cheonan, Chungcheongnam-do, Korea. She is granddaughter of Han Seong-jun who was a master of Korean dance and her father was Han Hui-jong. She dropped out from Hongsang Galmi school when she was 9 and then moved to Seoul with her grandfather Han Seong-jun to learn Korean dance when she was 13. She learned Haegeum and Yanggeum at the Joseon Music and Dance Institute and also learned all the Korean dance like Seungmu, Hakmu, Taepyeongmu, Salpuri, Barachum. She made her first performance at her grandfather's dance conference at bumingwan in Seoul. She took over the Han Seong-jun dance institute and succeeded her grandfather's Korean dance style after he died. She had her performance tour in Japan, Manchuria, Hwanghae Province, Pyongan Province, and Hamgyong Province. She married accordion player Hwang Byeong-ryeol in 1944. She died on October 8, 1990.

== Career ==
She founded Han Young-suk Classical Dance Institute in 1946 to teach students. She was a Korean dance instructor at Gukak Korea Arts School (now Gukak Seoul Arts High School), Sorabol College of Arts, Ewha Womans University, Seoul Arts High School, Seoul Arts College, Sudo Teachers College, and the Seoul City Dance Company. She participated as a national mission in Japan, Osaka Expo. In 1972, she was a folk troupes in the Sapporo Winter Olympic Games. She also did folk troupes in Munich Summer Olympic Games and in 1975, she got a tour of Japan and Okinawa for 30th anniversary of independence of Korea. She also performed at Okinawa ocean Expo in a National Day concert. In 1988, she did her specialty, Salpuri, at the Seoul Olympic Games closing ceremony event.

== Awards ==
Han received the Seoul Culture Prize in 1967, the 3rd Seoul Newspaper Culture Prize and the National President's Award in 1970, and the 3rd Culture Art Award in 1971. Also she got Dongbaekjang Merit in 1973, National Academy of Arts of the Republic of Korea prize in 1980. In 1981, she was a professor in the dance department in Sejong University teaching Korean dance.
