= Taepyeongmu =

Korean traditional peace dance

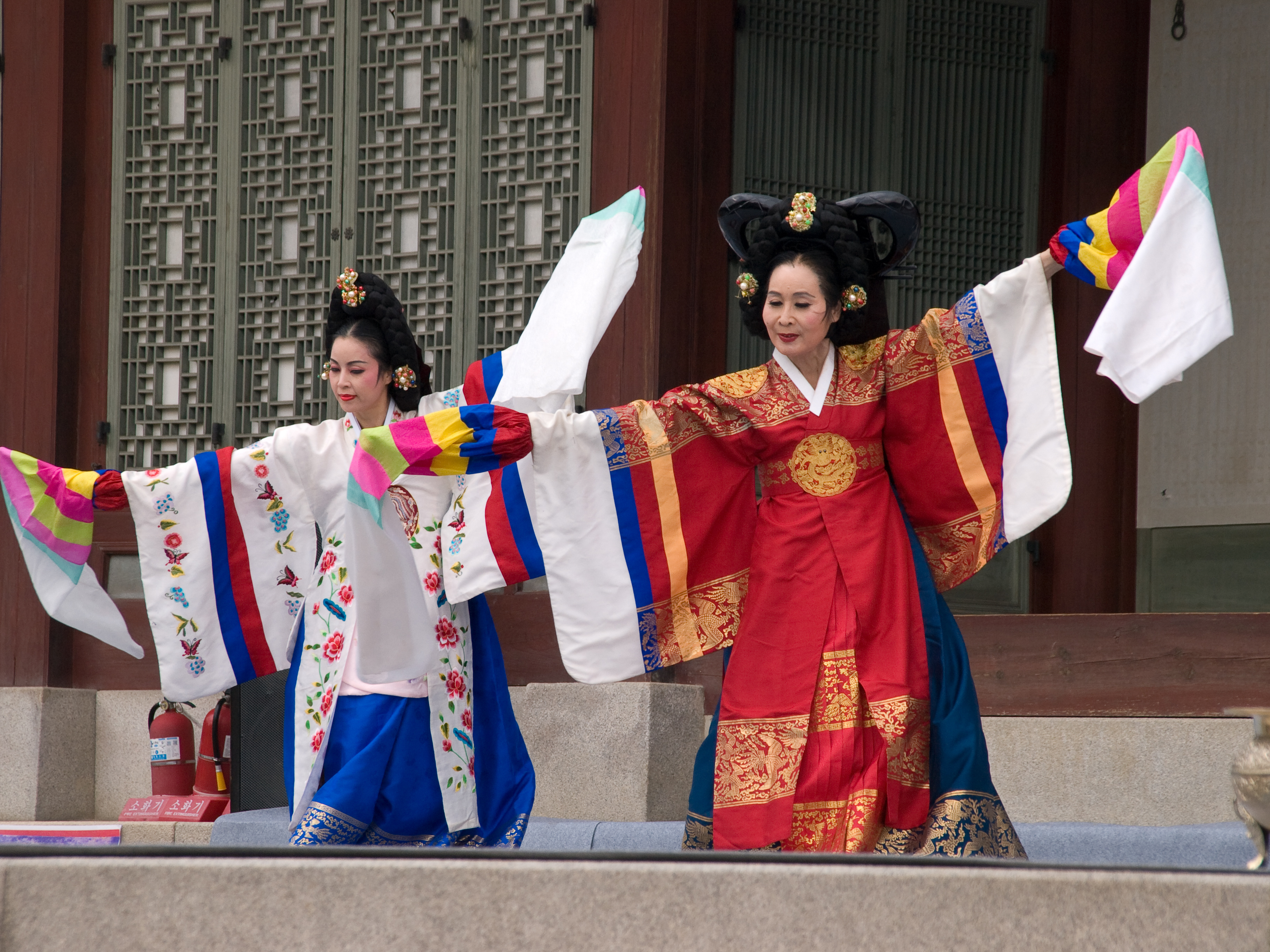

Korean name
- Hangul: 태평무
- Hanja: 太平舞
- RR: taepyeongmu
- MR: t'aep'yŏngmu

Taepyeongmu (Korean: 태평무; lit. 'great peace dance') is a Korean dance with the function of wishing a great peace for the country. Its exact origin is unknown, but certain style of the present was composed by Han Sŏngjun (1874–1941), an outstanding master of Korean dance in the beginning of last century. There are three assumptions regarding the origin of Taepyeongmu. One is a court dance occasionally performed by kings during the Joseon period. Therefore, the costumes used by the dancers are similar to the gwanbok (관복; lit. 'official clothing') formerly worn by Korea's kings and queens.

Taepyeongmu reflects the aesthetic principle of inner dynamics in the stillness, which is the essence of Korean traditional dance.

Taepyeongmu is designated as one of the Important Intangible Cultural Properties of South Korea. Famous practitioners have included Han Young-suk, designated a Living National Treasure for her performances.

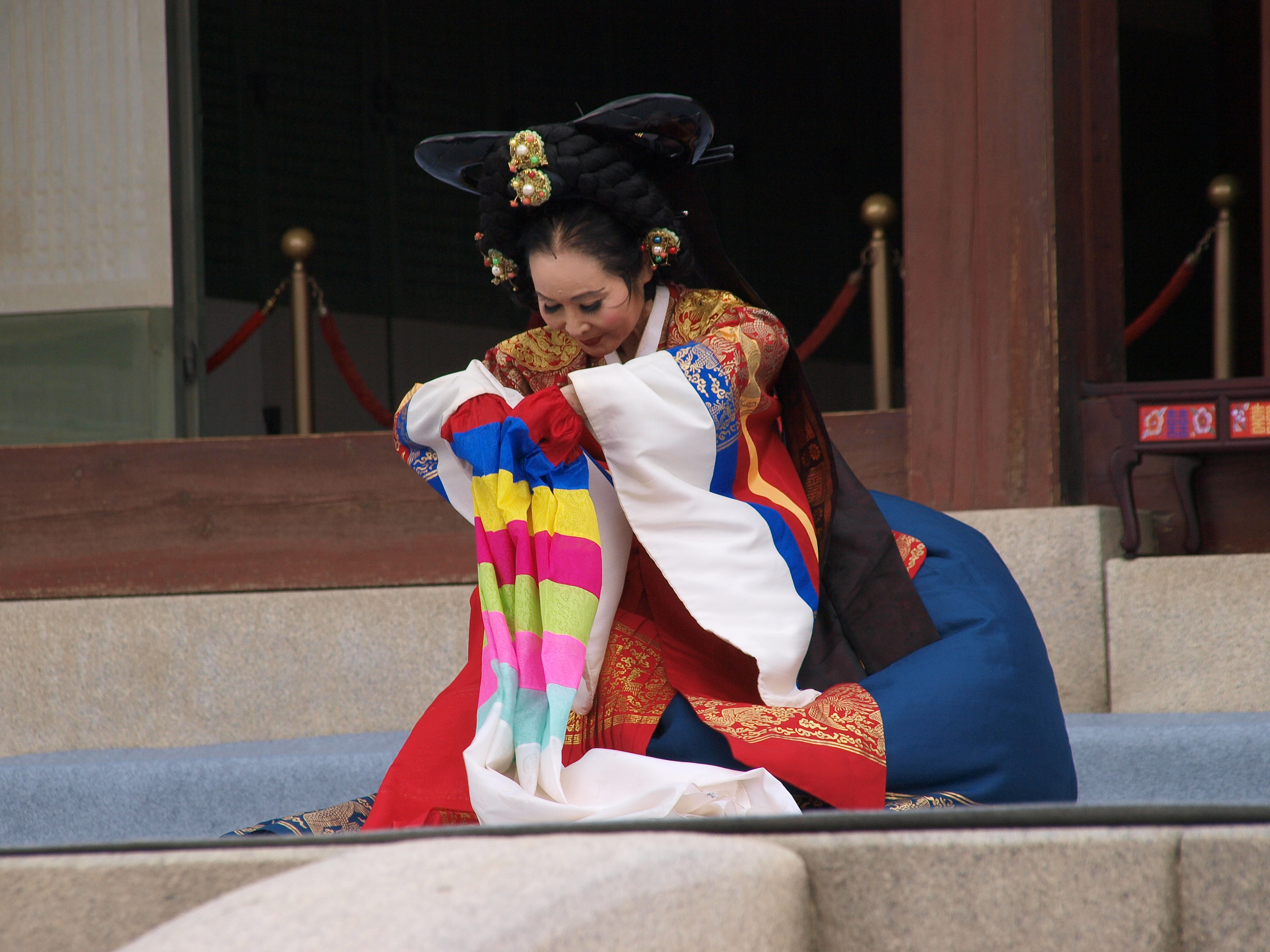

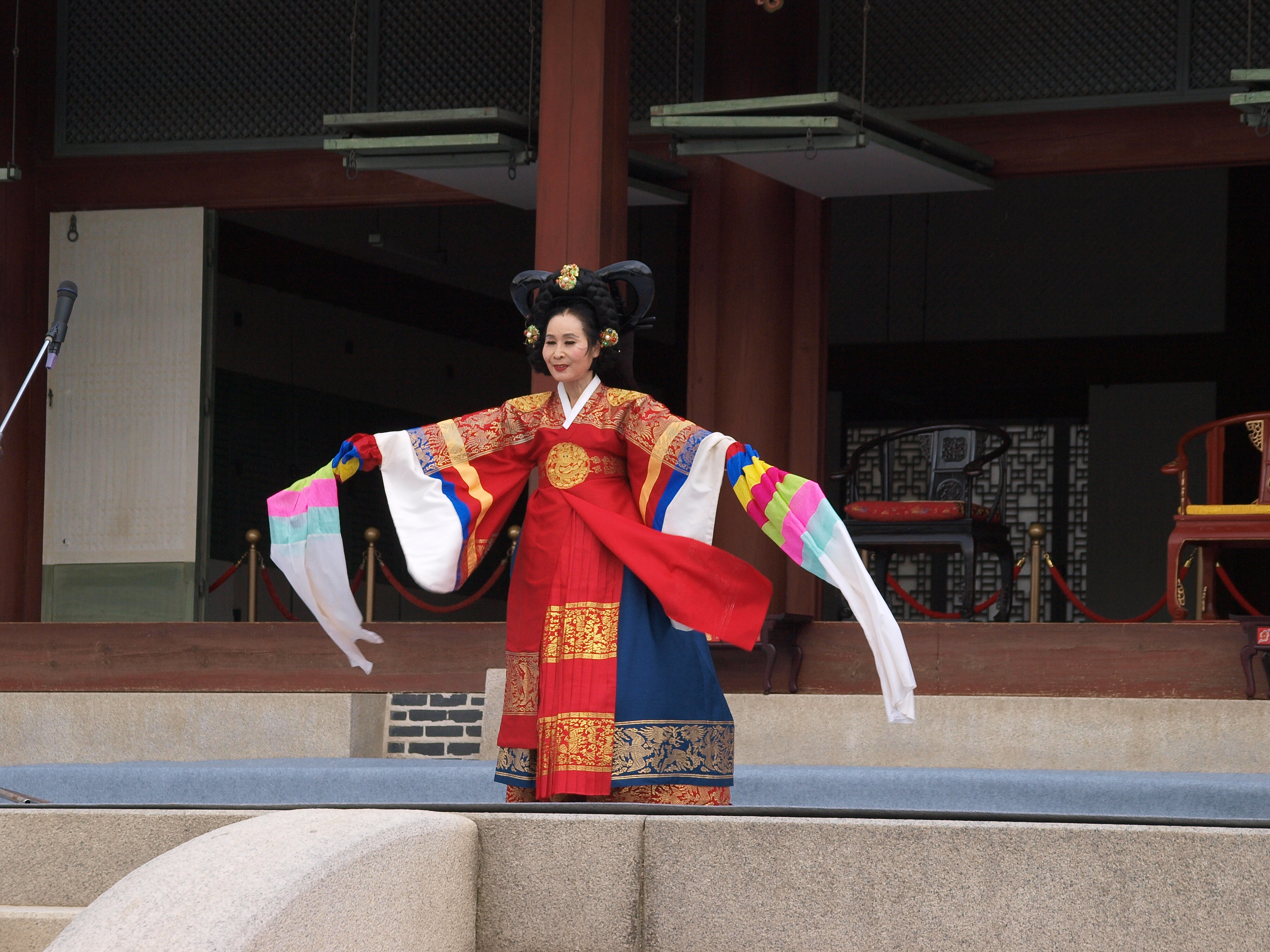

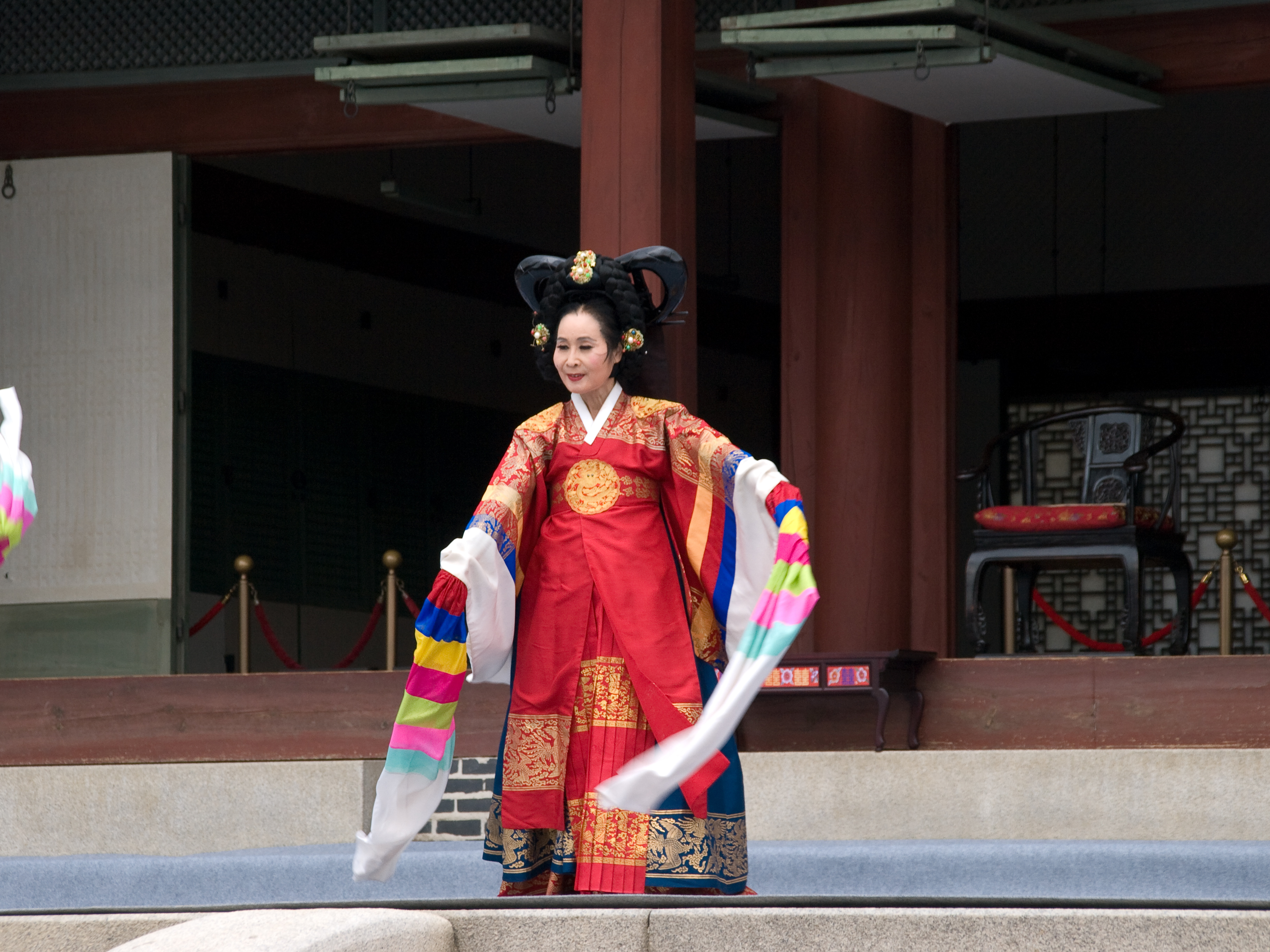

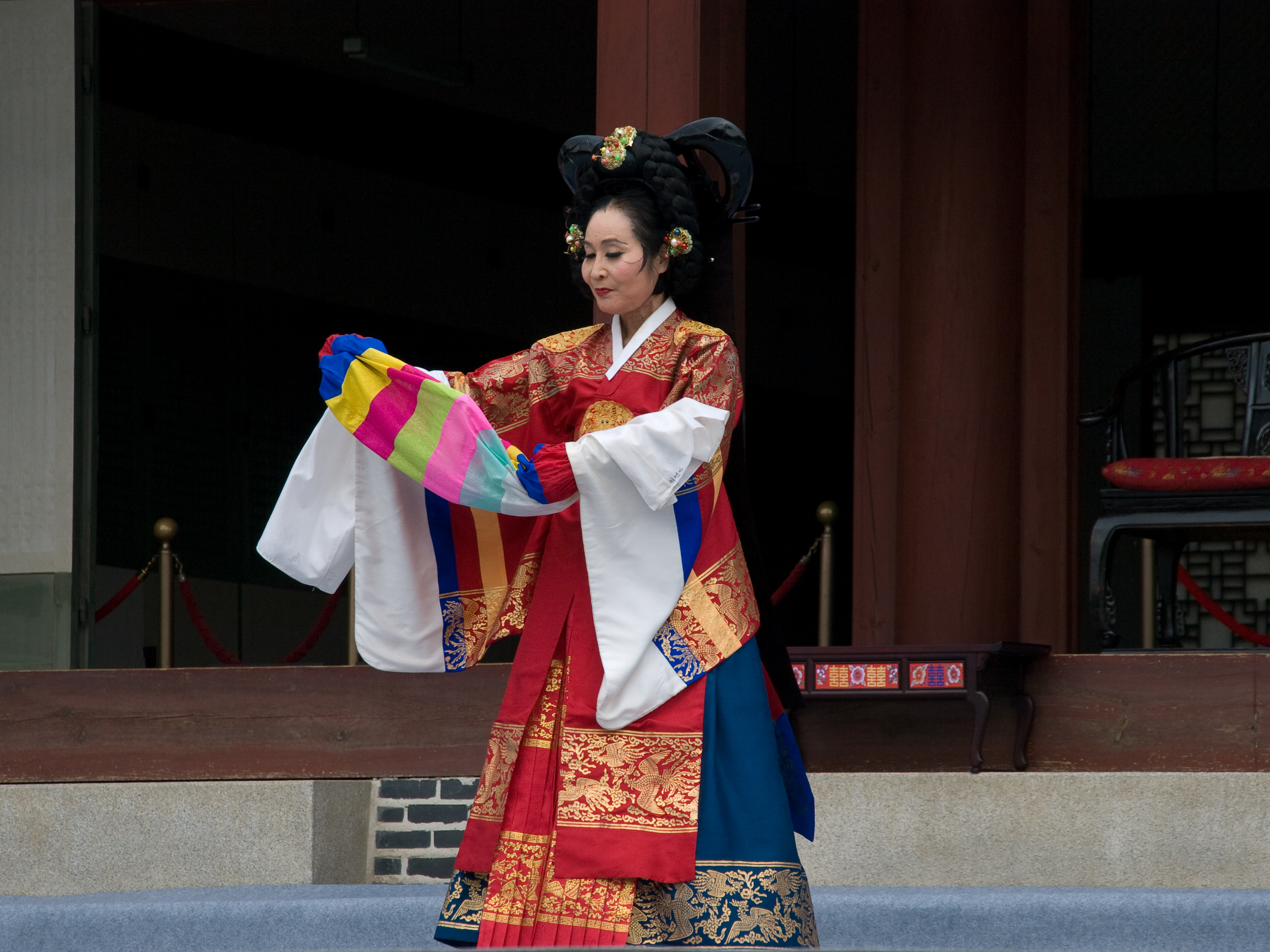

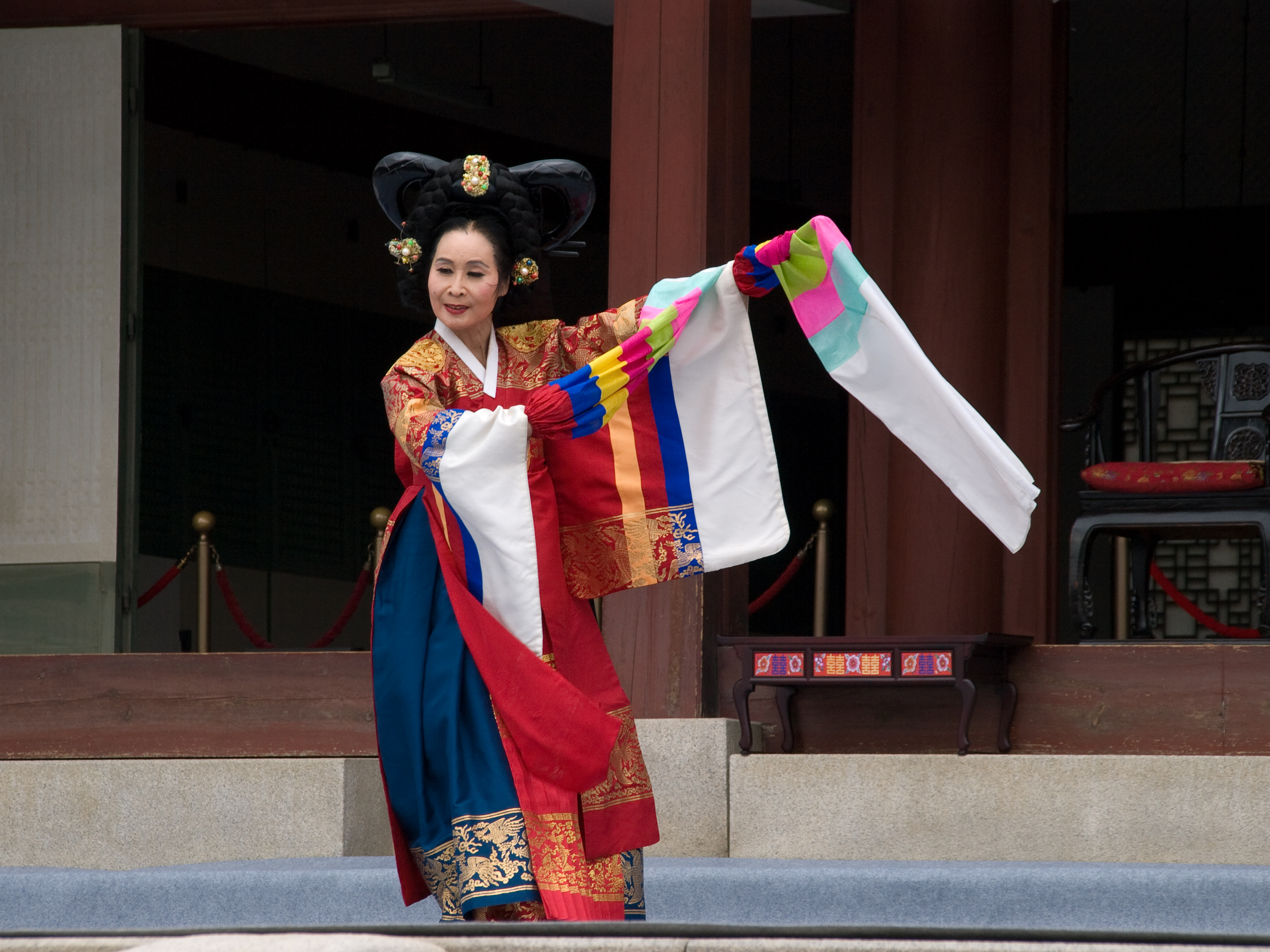

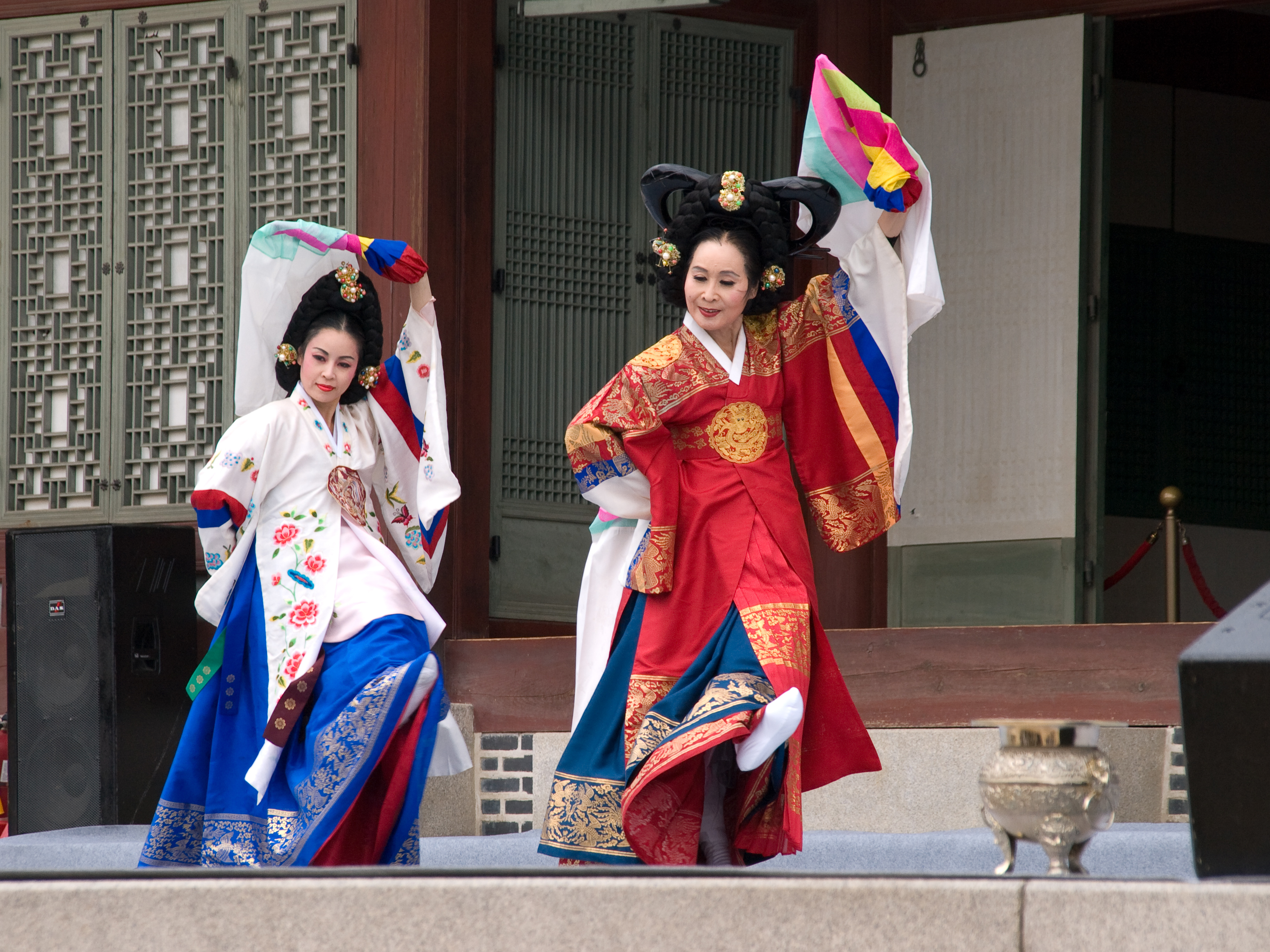

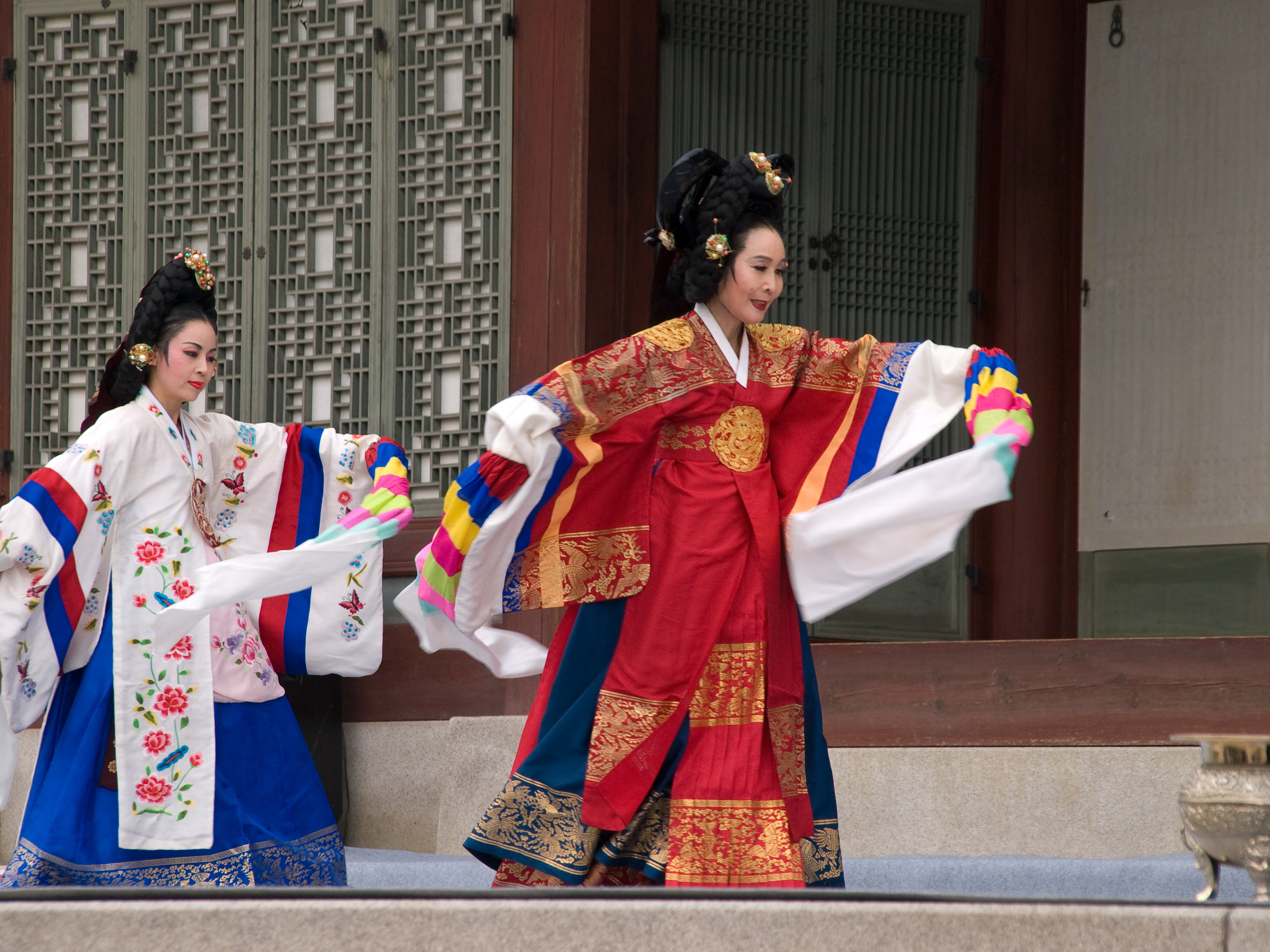

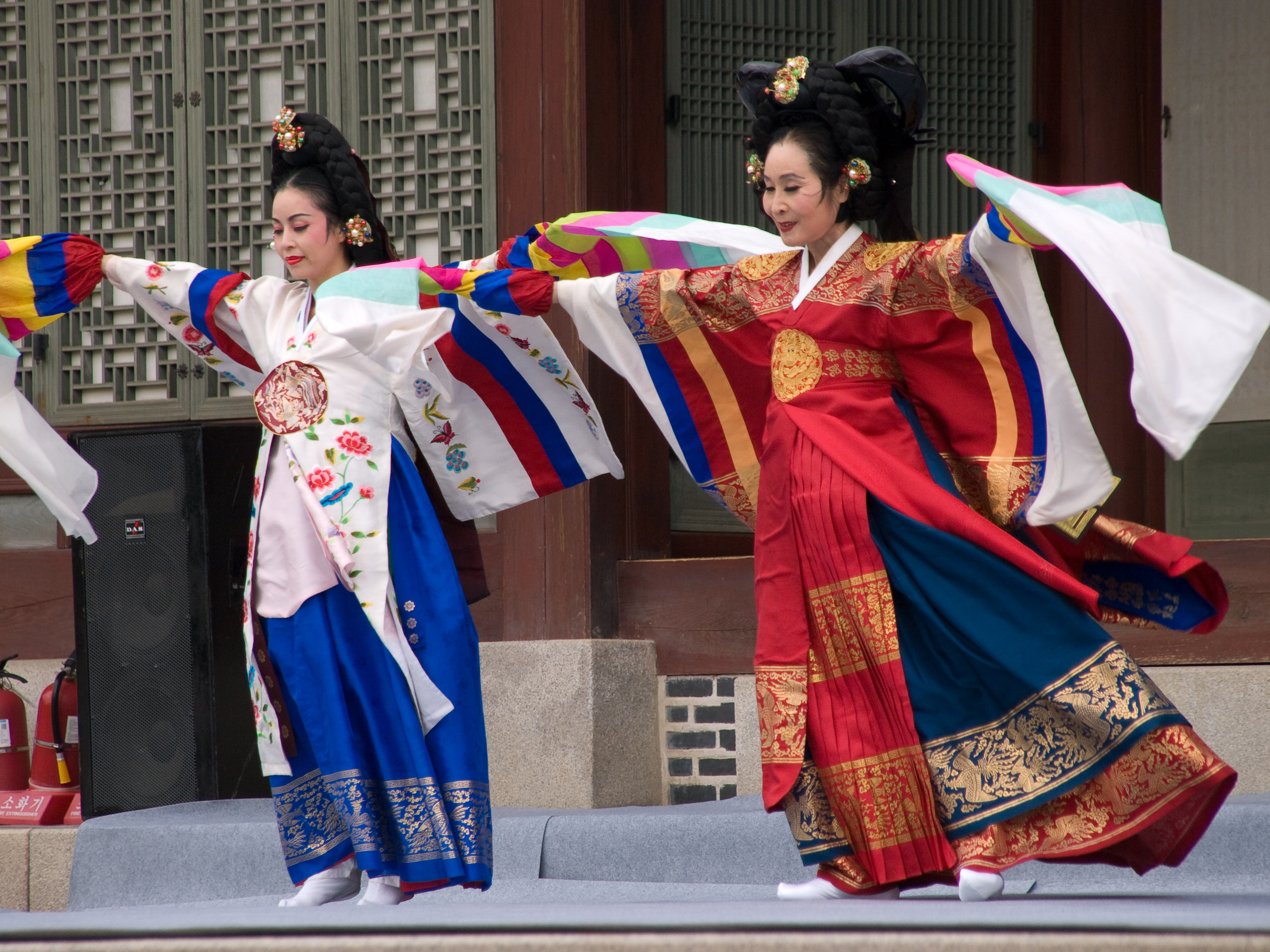

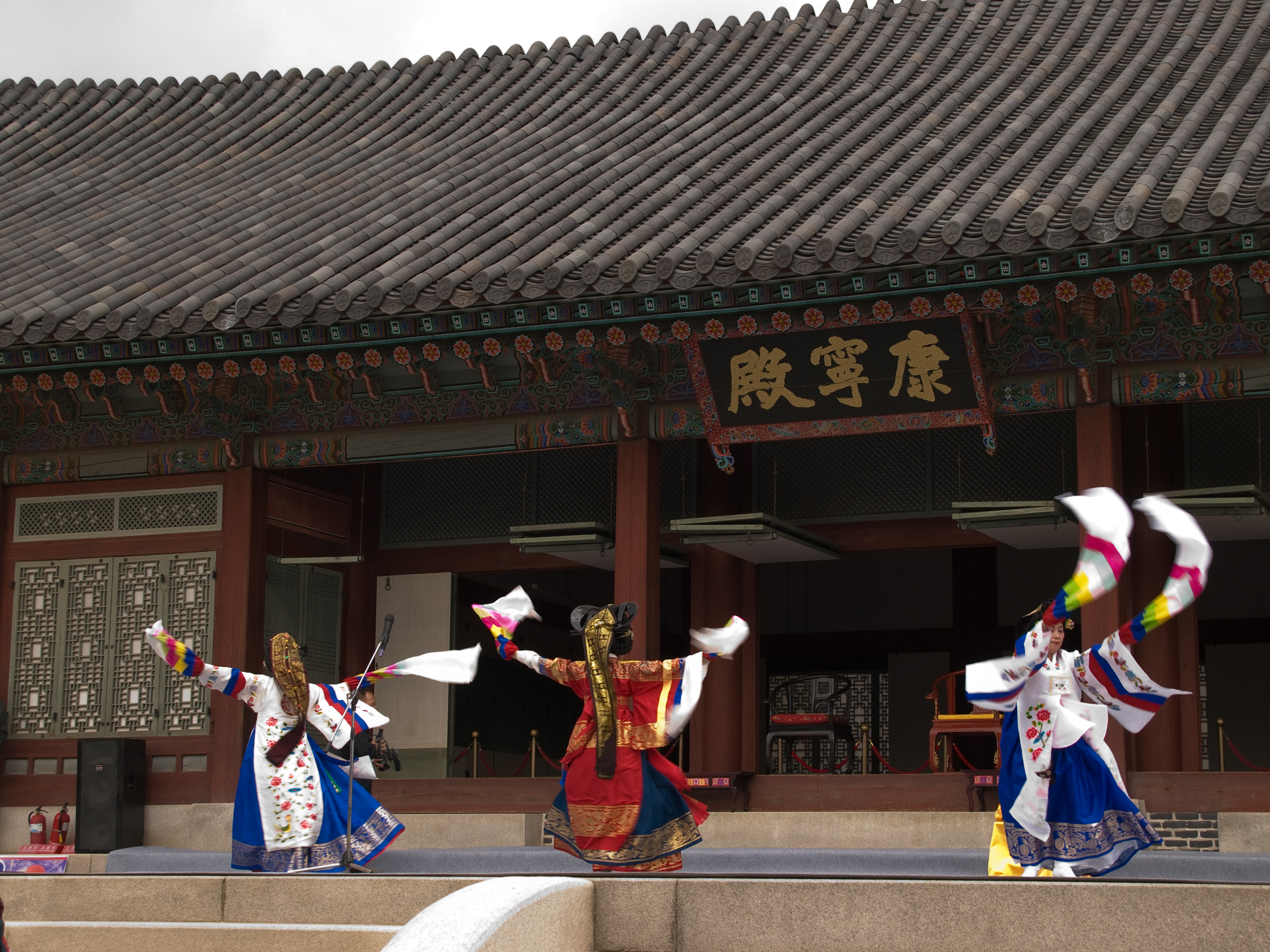

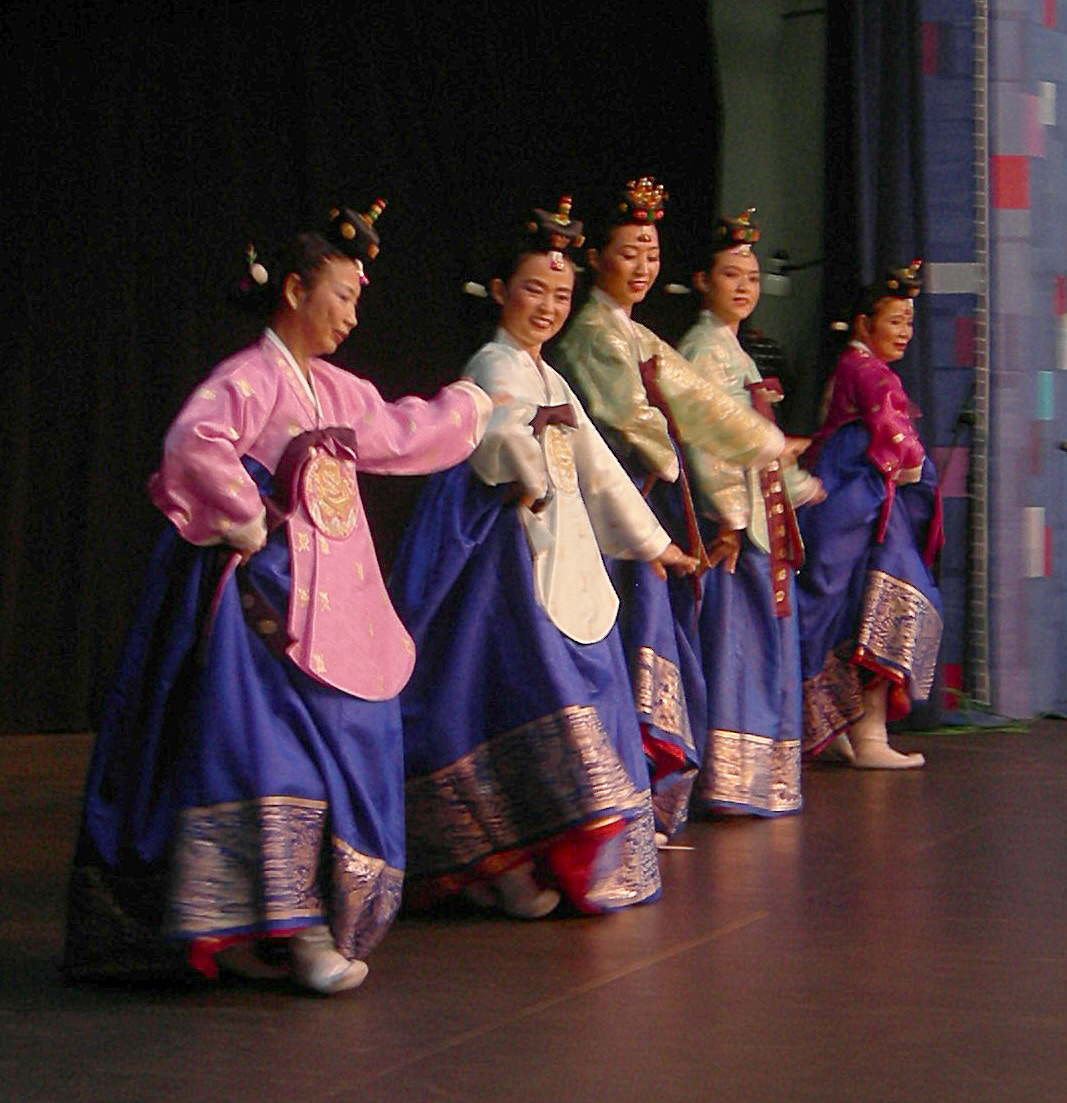

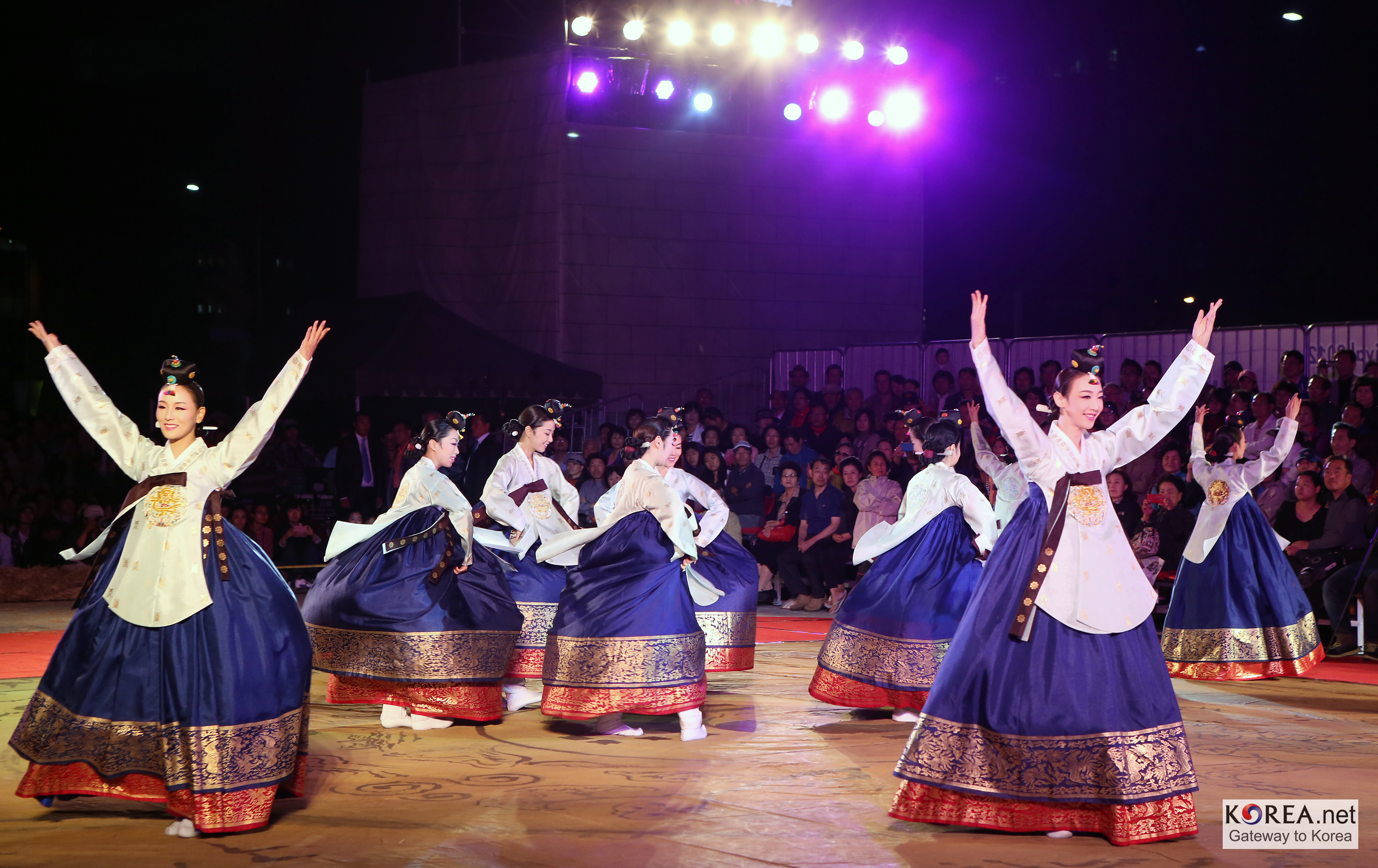

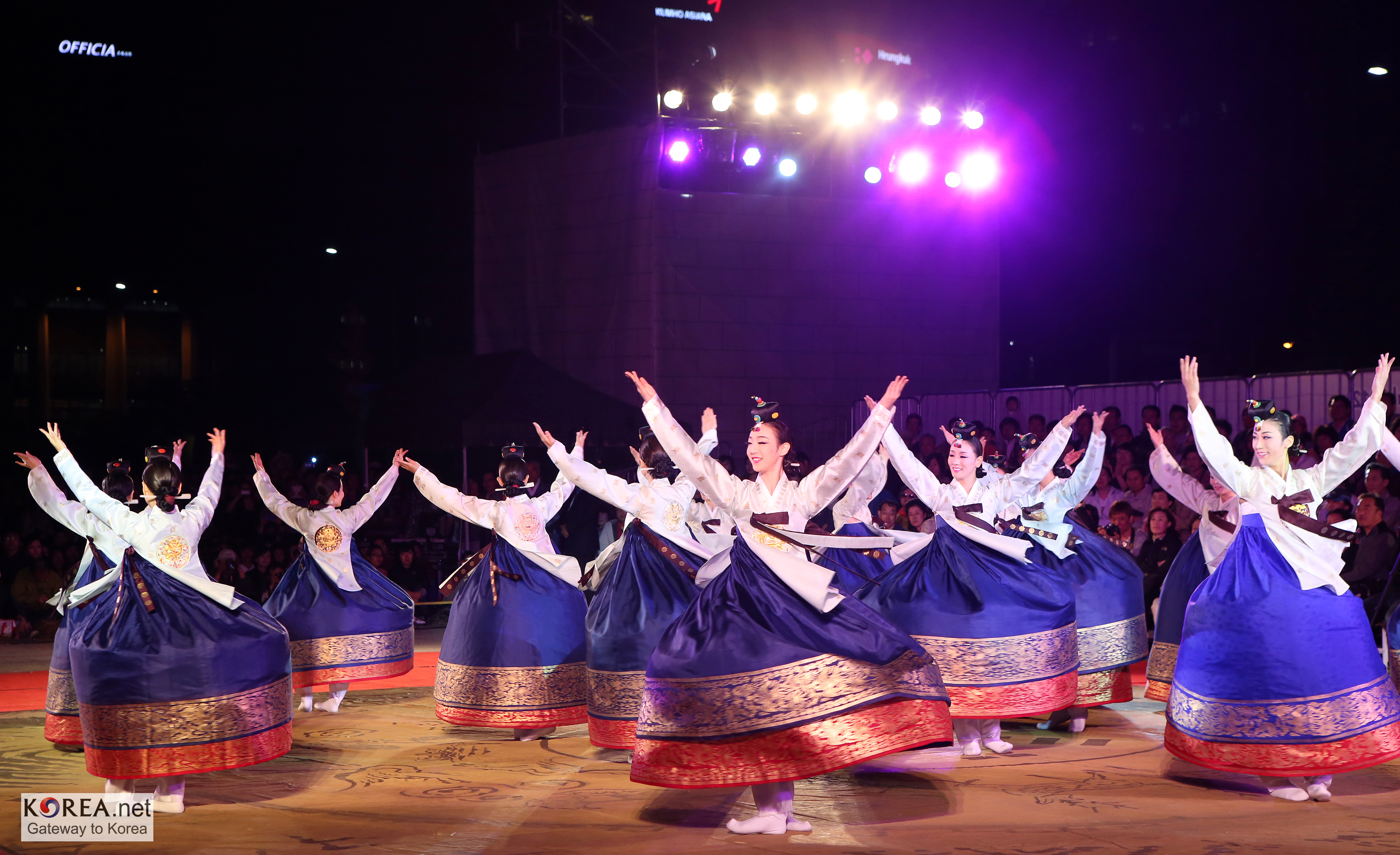

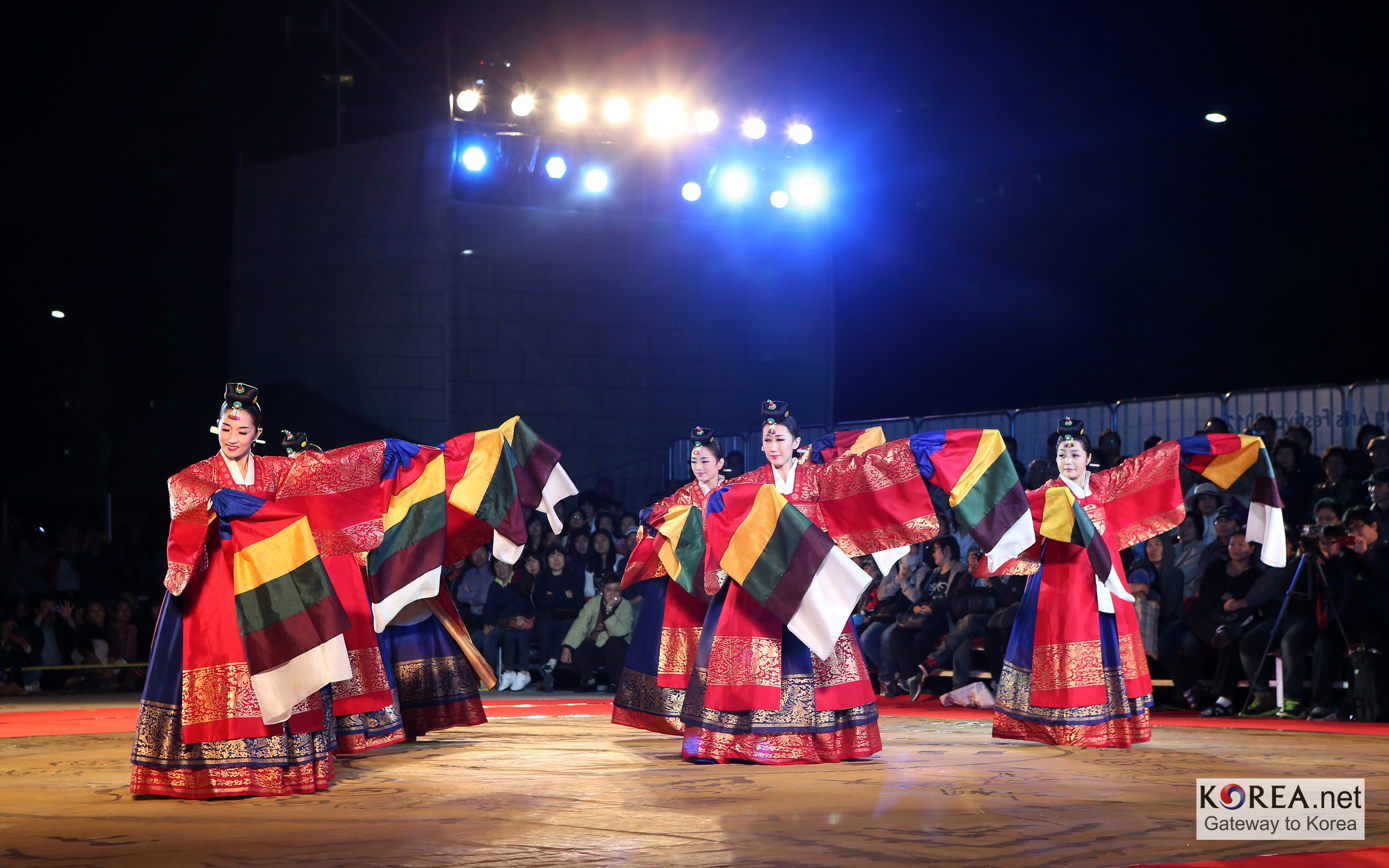

== See also ==
- Korean dance
- Important Intangible Cultural Properties of Korea
- Korean shamanism
