= Kim Sook-ja =

Kim Sook-ja (Korean: 김숙자; Hanja: 金淑子; December 20, 1926 – December 23, 1991) was an Ingan-munhwage of Salpulyi, which is the 97th Important Intangible Cultural Properties of Korea. As a Korean classical musician, she specialized in Gyeonggi province Salpulyi, so it is called Kim Sook-ja–style Salpulyi.

== Biography ==
Kim was born December 20, 1926, in Ansung, Gyeonggi Province, Korea in a family of shaman. Her grandfather Kim Suk-chang (김석창; 金碩昌) was a master of Pansori. Her father, Kim Duk-soon (김덕순; 金德順) was a master of pansori and Korean dance, teaching students at entertainment authorities in Ansung and Hwasung in the latter days of the Joseon dynasty. Kim learned Korean dance, Pansori and gayageum from her father and performed with his father. She graduated from Bogae elementary school in Ansung, which was famous for artists such as Namsadangpae and Geolrippae. At 17, she learned Yukjabaegi from her father's friend, Jo Jin-young and then she went to Manchuria and Southern Islands to perform seungmu and pansori by the Japanese Governor General of Korea.

== Career ==
In 1947, she established Daejun gugak institute. In 1953, she registered for Korean gukakwon. In 1961, Kim founded Kim Sook-ja dance institute. In 1979, she became President of South Korean shamanism Arts Preservation Association and subcommittee of Korean Dance, gukak Association. In 1981, Kim announced the Hwanghaedo manguk daetakgut Kim Sook-ja traditional dance performances conference. From 1981 to 1984, she organized the Shamanism Conference on Arts. In 1982, Kim performed Korean-Japanese folk dance and traditional dance presentations. In 1985, Kim performed a night show of traditional dances. In 1986, she appeared at Gukak Association Dance Division performances, Asian Games commemorative myeongmujeon appearances and a Salpuri Workshop in Tokyo. 1988, she performed at the 1988 Seoul Olympics torch procession. In 1989, Kim she performed shaman dance in Tokyo.

== Awards ==
In 1962, Kim was awarded the Minister of Culture and Public prize.
