= Kim Bak-young =

Korean bow maker (1929–2011)

- Born: December 20, 1929; Wangsindong Yecheoneup, Gyeongsangbuk-do
- Died: April 11, 2011 (aged 81); Canada
- Other names: Wooyoun (pseudonym)
- Known for: Gundo-making (Bow making)

Kim Bak-young (Korean: 김박영; Hanja: 金博榮; December 20, 1929 – April 11, 2011) was a Living National Treasure as a maker of Korean bows. He used Wooyoun (우연; 又連) as a pseudonym.

== Early life ==
Bak-young was born on December 20, 1929, in Wangsindong Yecheoneup, Gyeongsangbuk-do, Korea. He was the eldest of three children. His father, Kim Hong-gyeong, was a famous Gundo-making master in Yecheon province and his family had been Gundo-making masters for generations. When he graduated from Daechang high school, his skill was almost that of a professional. In 1964, he moved to Bucheon to start learning Gundo-making from Kim Jang-hwan, who was famous for Gyeonggi style Gundo-making at that time. Bak-young died on April 11, 2011, at the age of 81.

== Career ==
He participated in the 6th and 7th yes hoe won jeon Bucheon City Hall Lobby (Hall) in 2001 and 2002. In 2004 he participated in the 8th yesol hoe won jeon Bucheon City Hall Arts Center. In 2005 he participated in an art conference at the 9th yesol hoewonjeon yes hoe at Bucheon City Hall Arts Center.

In 2009, he participated in the 29th traditional crafts myeongpumjeon by the Important Intangible Cultural Property that features Conservation Association Korea in the Yeoju Gyeonggi province, and again at Seoul Important Intangible Cultural Center's Planning Exhibition, and again in the 7th Bucheon crafts conference by Bucheon Crafts Exhibition Society / Bucheon City Hall at Arts Center.

Other shows include Intangible Cultural Heritage Preservation Association hoe won jeon, traditional crafts conference at 11th Korea Foundation for Cultural Property Protection, International traditional handicrafts conference in Taiwan and Thailand, World's Fair Expo 1993 exhibition of works and performances, 29th Annual Union Exhibition of Universities of Korean Museum Association, and museum exhibition of works and performances at the Military Academy.

He was designated as a holder of Important Intangible Cultural Property No. 47 on December 10, 1996, by passing pupil, assistant and semi-holder of Gundo-making master.
