= Pyeonjeon =

Short arrow or bolt in Korean archery

Aegisal ("애기살" or "baby arrow" or sometimes "mini-arrow") or Pyeonjeon, (aka "(편전)", "Junjun") is a short arrow or bolt, shot using a longer bamboo arrow guide called the Deotsal (Tong-ah) in Korean archery. The tongah (aka "Tong-ah") allows one to draw a short arrow at a full draw length with a full sized bow, it is an overdraw device. A tongah used with a bow looks somewhat similar to a crossbow. The Japanese had a similar arrow called a "Kudaya", that was loosed through a pipe.

== Advantages ==
There are several advantages in shooting a shorter arrow, the shorter arrow is lighter (which means they're faster) and more aerodynamic. They shoot with a higher velocity which results in greater range and hits the target more quickly. Their speed and small size also made it harder for enemies to see them coming. Their higher speed and aerodynamic efficiency means they penetrate armour better at range. Broken arrows could also be recycled into short arrows.

In military archery, infantry troops with bows and arrows on the ground routinely used boys behind the front line to run and collect the arrows fired by the enemy that missed. This quickly re-supplied the front line troops with the missiles used against them that went too high or to the sides of the unit. A number of efforts over time were invented to prevent the enemy from responding with the arrows fired against them. The Pyeonjeon is one method, as opposing forces who lacked an overdraw device/tong-ah would be unable to use the short arrows on the field (though experienced opposition archers who figured out how the Pyeonjeon was fired or who were already equipped with an overdraw device similar to the tong-ah may have been able to re-use such arrows).

== Historical use ==
Used by the Koreans, this weapon was considered a national secret during the Japanese invasions of Korea (1592-1598). Its traditional range is 350 meters, five times the effective range of Arquebus or Tanegashima. Further more, the short bolts had longer range and flatter trajectory with a faster velocity and penetrating power.

Tongah and pyeonjeon were part of the standard kit of Joseon era archers. Their quivers held 20 arrows and 10 pyeonjeon arrows.

== Other similar devices ==
The Chinese bian jian(邊箭), Byzantine solenarion and Turkish majra were all similar devices

== In media ==
- The 2011 Korean film War of the Arrows depicted the protagonist fashioning a tongah while on the run in order to shoot some broken arrows.
- In the 2013 Korean drama Empress Ki, the protagonist Seung Nyang is an expert with the Pyeonjeon.
- In the 2014 Korean period action film The Fatal Encounter, the protagonist King Jeongjo uses the Pyeonjeon several times against long-range archers during an assassination attempt on him.

== Bibliography ==
- 이헌정, and Lee Heon-jung. 2017. "한·일 전통궁시(弓矢) 비교연구 -편전(片箭)과 구다야(管矢)를 중심으로-". 일본근대학연구. 57 권 권: 210. Abstract: 전(片箭)은 통상보다 짧은 화살을 통에 넣어서 발사하는 특수한 형태의 화살이다. 한국의 경우 편전에 대한 사료가 많으며 그 유래와 역사적 의의를 알아보기에도 용이하다. 그러나 편전을 쏘는 방법에 대해서는 자세한 기록이 남아있지 않으며 전승 또한 끊어졌기에 편전사법을 고증하기에는 어려운 상황이라 할 수 있다. 한편 일본의 경우 편전과 같은 형태의 화살을 구다야(管矢) 라 부르고 있다. 그러나 일본의 구다야에 대한 사료는 많지 않으며 구전되어 오는 것이 많기에, 그 유래와 역사적 의의를 정확히 파악하기가 힘들다. 또한 구전되어 오는 구다야는 그 형태가 `통에 넣어서 쏘는 화살` 이 아닌 `분리식 화살`이기에 그 실체 또한 명확하다 볼 수 없다. 그러나 이와 같이 사료가 부족한 상황에서도 『신명불심궁지서』라는 책은 구다야 사법을 그림과 글로 설명하고 있다. 이는 사법의 형태가 명확하지 않은 한국의 편전사법을 고증함에도 유용할 것이라 생각되어 현재 행해지는 편전사법과 비교 분석하였다. 그 결과 화살을 통에 넣어 활시위에 걸었을 때, 화살 깃의 방향에 차이가 있음을 알 수 있었다. Pyeonjeon is a unique type of arrow. In order to shoot it, one needs to put short arrow-the pyeonjeon into a pipe. In Korea, there are various records regarding this unique arrow, making it available to study on its origin and historical significance. However, in case of specific archery method, no detailed records exist nor any remains are transmitted from the past. In case of Japan, there existed similar type of arrow which is called as Kudaya. However, there are only few records related to Kudaya, making it difficult to research into it. In addition, the existence of Kudaya is obscure, since Kudaya is mainly transmitted down by words, and the form of Kudaya in those words is rather `a separative arrow` than `an arrow in the pipe`, In this situation where we lack historical materials, the book Shinmei husinyuminosyo explains the archery method of Kudaya by pictures and writings. This will surely suggest clues to explain the archery method of Korean Pyeonjeon. By comparing Pyeonjeon with Shinmei husinyuminosyo, we figured out that the difference of Pyeonjeon and Shinmei husinyuminosyo lies in the direction of fletchings, when the arrow is put into a pipe and strung by the bowstring.
- 2007. "『조선왕조실록(朝鮮王朝實錄)』에 보이는 정조대왕(正祖大王)의 <궁술(弓術)> 「무(武)」의 신체지(身體知)". 한국사회체육학회지 (Journal of Sport and Leisure Studies). 30: 111-129. Abstract: In this paper, the tacit knowledge of military arts in Lord King Jeongjo(正祖)`s archery(弓術) has been studied. The following facts could be summarized. first, Lord King Jeongjo(正祖) compiled "Mu Ye Do Bo Tong-Ji(《武藝圖譜通志》)" - which is the one of his great achievement in Korean history - through the tacit knowledge of military arts in archery(弓術). second, he taught principles and thoughts of the tacit knowledge to his "Mun Mu Beak Gung(文武百官)" through the military affairs of archery(弓術). third, he forth, Not his moral characters in the tacit knowledge of military arts in archery(弓術) to civil ministers and developed martial spirit to his military officials. fourth, Not only he was a master of archery(弓術) but also put on the best record among the kings of many generations in Cho Sun(朝鮮). fifth, when he shot 50 arrows, he purposely shot one arrow into the sky in order to teach "Mun Mu Beak Gung(文武百官)" about the man of honor. However, the other 49 shots hit very center of the target. These facts explain how valuable the tacit knowledge of military art was in Korean history. We need to realize how important and valuable our inheritance is and find out what the meaning of Korean martial art in the past was.
- 신원선, and Won Seon Sin. 2015. "일반논문 : <최종병기 활>에 구현된 민족주의 코드의 두 양상". 현대영화연구. 21 권 권, no. 1 호 호: 91. "General Papers: Two Aspects of Nationalistic Codes Implemented in 'The Last Arms'" Abstract: This study examined the internal and external meanings of nationalist codes observed in War of the Arrows a history movie about Qing’s invasion in 1637. With regard to the internal pattern of nationalist codes, this study examined the meanings of Joseon as a sacred space of the nation and the Bidulginang Fall (Pigeon Cliff Fall). The movie tells the story that Joseon people who had been taken captive to China in Qing’s invasion in 1637 were attempting to go back to their homeland Joseon. To them, Joseon or Hanyang was not merely a state or a capital city but existed as a sacred space of the nation that would restore their identity. The Bidulginang Fall had also a meaning as a sacred place of the nation where the tiger of Mt. Baekdu, which saved the life of hero Nam-yi, lived. With regard to the external pattern of nationalist codes, this study examined the meanings of traditional archery that had already been stopped and Manchu that was virtually a dead language. The movie shows restored horseback archery, run archery, mini arrow, etc., which are our traditional archery discontinued long ago. Among them, mini arrow, which is called baby arrow, is a Korean national arrow symbolizing people’s power that looks weak but is actually strong. The restoration of mini arrow shows clearly the nationalistic aiming point of this movie. In consideration that our national power comes from Hangeul preserved by our people, the restoration and representation of Manchu itself stimulates the audience's nationalistic sentiment.
- 최형국, and Hyeong Guk Choi. 2015. "18세기 활쏘기(國弓) 수련방식과 그 실제 -『림원경제지(林園經濟志)』『유예지(遊藝志)』射訣을 중심으로". 탐라문화. 50 권 권: 234. Abstract: 본 연구는 『林園經濟志』 「遊藝志」에 수록된 射訣을 실제 수련을 바탕으로 한몸 문화의 관점에서 분석하여 18세기 활쏘기 수련방식과 그 무예사적 의미를 살펴보았다. 또한 『射法秘傳攻瑕』와 『조선의 궁술』 중 射法要訣에 해당하는 부분을 서로 비교하여 전통 활쏘기의 보편적 특성을 살펴보았다. 『임원경제지』의 저자인 서유구는 대표적인 京華世族으로 家學으로 전해진 농업에 대한 관심을 통해 향촌생활에 필요한 여러 가지 일들을 어릴 적부터 접할 수 있었다. 또한 관직에 오른 후에는 순창군수를 비롯한 향촌사회의 일을 직접 살필 수 있는 관력이 있었는가 하면, 閣臣으로 있을 때에는 수많은 서적들을 규장각이라는 거대한 지식집합소를 관리했기에 백과사전적 공부를 진행할 수 있었다. 그리고 『鄕禮合編』 등 다양한 서적들의 편찬을 담당하면서 의례를 비롯한 전통지식을 물론이고, 청나라에서 수입한 새로운 實學書들을 정리하는 과정에서 지식의 체계적인 관리와 정보의 중요성을 인식하여 『임원경제지』를 저술하게 되었다. 『임원경제지』 중 사결에는 당대 활쏘기의 수련방식과 활과 화살을 제조하는 것에 이르기까지 활쏘기와 관련한 다양한 정보를 수록하고 있다. 특히 서유구 자신이 활쏘기를 젊을 때부터 익혔고, 활쏘기 역시 家學으로 여겨질 만큼 집안의 거의 모든 사내들이 익혔기에 보다 실용적인 부분을 중심으로 체계화시킬 수 있었다. 이러한 사결의 내용 중 실제 활쏘기 수련시 나타나는 다양한 몸문화적인 측면을 요즘의 활쏘기와 비교 분석하며 정리하였다. 이를 통해 『임원경제지』의 사결에 실린 활쏘기의 모습이 당대의 몸문화를 가장 잘 반영하고 있음을 확인할 수 있었다. In this research, we observed archery training methods in the 18th century and its military artistic meaning from somatic cultural perspective by reviewing Sagyul(射訣, instructional description on archery collected in 『ImwonGyeongjeji』(林圓經濟志, encyclopedia written by Seo Yu-gu) Yuyeji (遊藝志, arts and crafts of gentry class). In addition, this study recognized universal characteristics of Korean traditional archery by examining related contents including Sabupbijeon-gongha(『射法秘傳功瑕』, book on archery published by Pyongyang-Gamyeong in late Joseon dynasty) and Sabup-yo-gyul(射法要訣, condensed archery manual) collected in 『Archery of Joseon』, which is an instructional book on archery written in 20th century. Seo Yu-gu, the writer of 『ImwonGyeongjeji』, was a representative Kyung Hwa Sa Gok(京華士族, privilege rank that monopolized an honor and an official post in the 18th in Korean governing class). Affected by agricultural academic tradition of his family, he was able to experience variety of things necessary to rural environment. Furthermore, after filling the office, he had an authority to take care rural society directly including Sunchang District Governor. When he worked in Gyujanggak (奎章閣, royal library built in late Joseon dynasty), he even arranged encyclopedic research as he managed all the databases collected in the library. In the process of handling various book publication including ritual book such as 『Hyangryehap-pyun』(鄕禮合編, integrated book on rural ritual) and arranging new practical science books imported from Qing dynasty, he felt necessity of systematic management of knowledge and information and its outcome was 『ImwonGyeongjeji』. In Sagyul, there are different kinds of information on archery from training types to manufacturing methods of bow and arrows. Especially, he organized it by putting more stress on practicality as Seo Yu-gu himself trained archery since childhood and almost every men in his family mastered it in their life. According to this, various somatic cultural aspects that appeared in Sagyul were examined by comparing current archery.
- 李 燦雨. 2012. "『御射古風帖』(1791-1792)にみる18世紀末の朝鮮弓術 : 弓術種目と弓具に着目して". 体育学研究. 57, no. 2: 501-513. Notes: Korean traditional archery in the late 18th century as described in the "records of the old custom of King's archery", focusing on archery events and equipment 『 ゴ シャ コフウジョウ 』(1791-1792)ニ ミル 18セイキマツ ノ チョウセン キュウジュツ : キュウジュツ シュモク ト キュウグ ニ チャクモク シテ 『 go sha kofujo 』(1791-1792)Ni miru 18seikimatsu no chosen kyujutsu : Kyujutsu shumoku to kyugu ni chakumoku shite.
- 이찬우, and Chan Woo Lee. 2014. "『궁도강좌(弓道講座)』에 보이는 조선(朝鮮)의 궁시(弓矢)". 체육사학회지. 19 권 권, no. 2 호 호: 59. Abstract: 궁술은 조선의 대표적인 무예로 번영하였으나, 근대에 들어 實用性의 喪失과 더불어 급격히 衰退하여, 그 문화가 온전히 전하지 않는다. 본 연구에서는 근대화와 한국전쟁 속에서 亡失된 弓術자료를 보완하고자, 日本의 궁술자료인 『弓道講座』에 수록된 「朝鮮の弓矢」를 解讀·分析하여, 조선의 전통적 弓具의 一端을 규명하고자 하였다. 그 결과, 일본에 소개된 활·화살·깍지·과녁 등의 實測諸元를 통해, 조선 弓具의 形態, 材質, 用途 등을 상세히 살펴볼 수 있었다. 특히, 화살은 부위별 크기와 재질, 무게, 무게중심이 詳細히 밝혀졌고, 鏃은 鏑·板付·柳葉의 촉이 있었으며, 우는 촉(鳴根)은 맹수를 쏠 때 짐승을 놀래는 용도였음이 드러났다. 桶兒는 片箭과의 마찰과 압력에 견디고 落箭을 방지하기 위해 특이한 재질과 구조로 되어 있었다. 둥근 촉이 살대 깊이 박혀있어 굵고 무거운 六兩箭은 사거리보다 파괴력을 중시한 구조였다. 朝鮮通信使를 통해 전해져 1세기 전에 日本에서 출판된 이 사료를 통해, 掌甲의 용도나 帆帿에 그려진 離卦의 의미 등 현재 한국의 射亭에서 잊혀져버린 朝鮮 弓術文化의 一端을 엿볼 수 있었다. The archery that prospered as Korean representative martial arts, suddenly declined with the loss of the utility in modern times, and there are a lot of things to unknown. This paper tried to investigated about Korean traditional archery equipments through decoding and historical consideration of ‘Bows and Arrows of Joseon’ which is included in the “Kyudo Kouza”, to make up for the lost historical materials of archery during modernization and Korean war. It became clear the detail sizes, weights, quality of the materials, the center of gravity through the survey results of each equipments. Particularly, the Whistling Arrow was used to threaten a wild beast, the Arrow Pipe was framed of unique material and structure for endure the friction and pressure, and the Big-iron Arrow was structured for enhance destructive power than shooting range. Through this historical material which was published about one century ago, we could peeped into some of the lost Korean traditional archery culture.
