= Kwon Museok =

Korean intangible cultural asset

Kwon Museok (Korean: 권무석, born February 12, 1942) is a Korean intangible cultural asset. Kwon Museok is a recognized artisan of Gungdo. He inherited the family business, which is 12 generations old. In 1994, he received the 'Proud Seoul Civil Prize' (자랑스런 서울시민상 경력각궁공방).

== Work experience ==
- 2000, Professor at Yanbian University
- Korean Traditional Culture School, Teacher - Gungdo
- Korea Military Academy, Teacher
- Korean Air Force Academy, Teacher
- Korea National Police University, Teacher
