= Yeomsaek =

Korean traditional cloth dying

Yeomsaek (Korean: 염색) is a traditional Korean process for dyeing cloth.

Yeomsaek primarily uses natural colourings such as tea, saffron and gardenia. The most important of these from a cultural perspective is indigo (jjock), which was used for the Korean Royal Family and for weddings.

The indigo dyeing process is centred in the Naju area, where regular flooding of the Yeongsan River provides an ideal wetland environment for the indigo plant. The plants are harvested in July, before they flower, and the leaves are stored in earthenware jars of water for several days to extract the pigment. The leaves are then removed and the water is mixed with lime from powdered oyster or clam shells to create a base. The leaves are dried and burned, and the ash is used as a source of lye which is mixed with the base. Finally, the mixture is stirred and fermented for several days to produce the eventual dye. Fabric to be dyed is soaked in the resulting liquid (which stains it yellow) and then dried in sunlight, which activates the pigments and turns the cloth a deep blue.

I think the color indigo is a color in which lives the spirit and soul of the Korean people.

— Jung Gwan-chae

The current master of this process, designated a Living National Treasure, is Jung Gwan-chae, who has cultivated indigo plants and prepared dye for over three decades. He became interested in the process at university, when one of his teachers gave him an indigo seed as a gift. Experimentation led to his rediscovery of traditional jjock-yeomsaek processes, and he has since become the major exponent of the art in Korea.
