= Gakgung =

Korean traditional bow

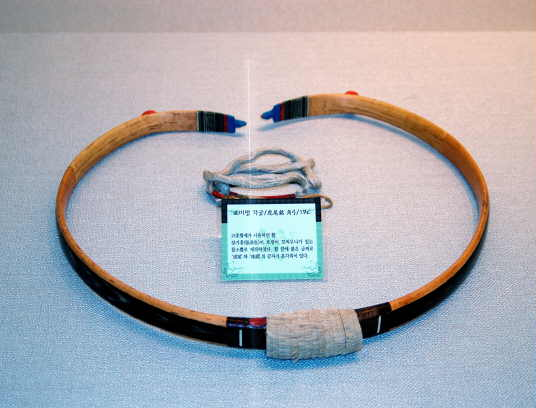
- A gakgung that has not been strung

Korean name
- Hangul: 각궁
- Hanja: 角弓
- RR: gakgung
- MR: kakkung

Alternate name
- Hangul: 국궁
- Hanja: 國弓
- RR: gukgung
- MR: kukkung

The gakgung (Korean: 각궁; Hanja: 角弓), also called Korean bow, is a water buffalo horn-based composite reflex bow, standardized centuries ago from a variety of similar weapons in earlier use. Due to its long use by Koreans, it is also known as Guk Gung (Korean: 국궁 hanja: 國弓, or national bow). The Korean bow utilizes a thumb draw and therefore employing the use of a thumb ring is quite common. The Korean thumb ring is somewhat different from the Manchu, Mongol, or the Turkic thumb rings, as it comes in two styles, male and female. Male thumb rings are shaped with a small protrusion that sticks out that the bowstring hooks behind (similar to a release aid), while the female thumb ring simply covers the front joint of the thumb as protection from getting blisters (pulling heavy bows repetitively with only the thumb can easily cause blisters to form on the pad of the thumb).

Gungsul, Korean: 궁술, hanja: 弓術, sometimes also romanized as goong sool, literally means "techniques of the bow" or "skill with the bow". It is also referred to as Korean traditional archery. However, goong sool is not a desirable expression. Gungdo, Korean: 궁도, hanja: 弓道, "way of the bow" is another epithet for traditional Korean archery, as used by Koreans.

== History of military origin and usage ==
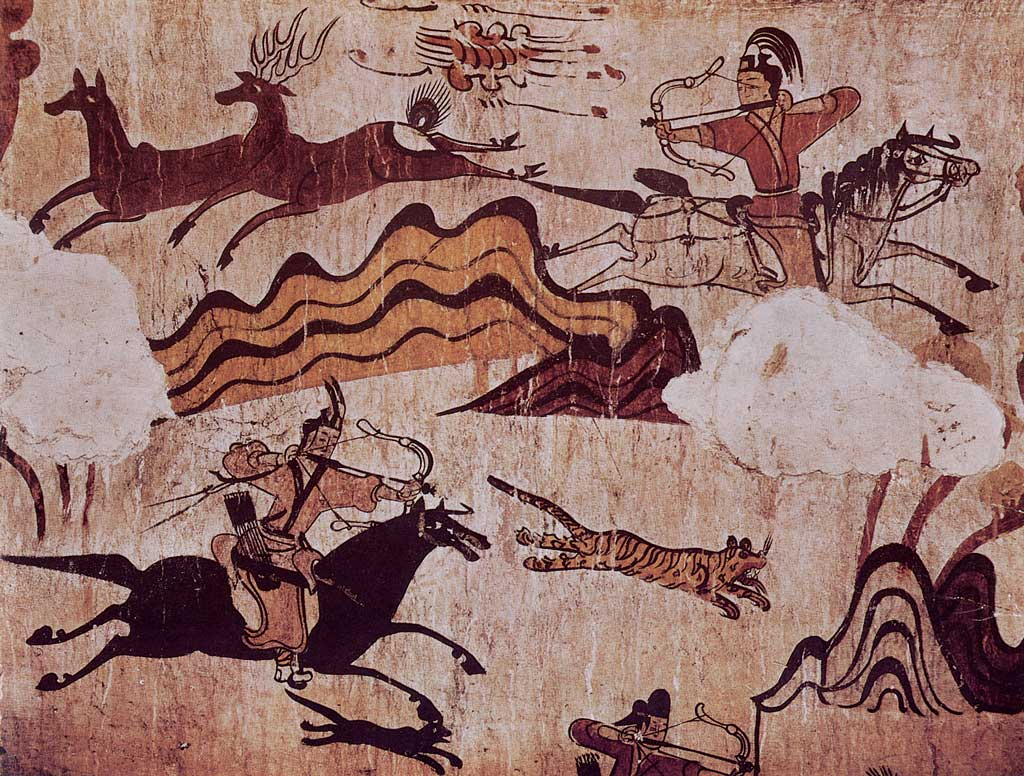
Korean Horseback archery in 5th-century

Oracle bone script version of the yi character

The reflex bow had been the most important weapon for Koreans in wars with Chinese dynasties and nomadic peoples, recorded from the 1st century BC. Legend says the first king and founder of the Goguryeo, Go Jumong, was a master of archery, able to catch five flies with one arrow. Bak Hyeokgeose, the first king of the Silla, was also said to be a skilled archer. The ancient Chinese gave the people of the East (Shandong Peninsula, Huai river basin, Jianghuai, Manchuria, the Korean Peninsula, Japanese archipelago, and eastern Siberia) the name of Dongyi (東夷) being a combination of the two characters for "large" (大) and "bow" (弓). However, it also need to be noted that the term was widely applied by the Chinese to note any foreign tribes in the east associated with large bows.

Yi Sŏng-gye, the founding king of Joseon was known to have been a master archer. In a battle against Japanese pirates, Sŏng-gye, assisted by Yi Bangsil, killed the young samurai commander "Agibaldo" with two successive arrows, one arrow knocking out his helmet, with the second arrow entering his mouth. In his letter to General Ch'oe Yŏng, Sŏng-gye lists as one of five reasons not to invade Ming China as during the monsoon season, glue holding together the composite bow weakens, reducing the effectiveness of the bow.

The founding of Joseon dynasty saw the retention of the composite bow as the mainstay of the Joseon military. Archery was the main martial event tested during the military portion of the national service exam held annually from 1392 to 1894. Under Joseon, archery reached its zenith, resulting in the invention of pyeonjeon, which saw great service against the Japanese in 1592 and against the Manchus in early 1600s.

Until the Imjin wars, archery was the main long-range weapon system. During those wars, the tactical superiority of the matchlock-ignited arquebus became apparent, despite its slow rate of fire and susceptibility to wet weather. However, it was the gakgung, referred to as the "half bow" by the Japanese, that halted the Japanese at the Battle of Haengju as well as at the Battle of Ulsan. Although Joseon adopted the arquebus during the Imjin War, the gakgung retained its position of importance in the military until the reforms of 1894. Under King Hyojong's military reforms, an attempt was made to revive horse archery as a significant element of the military. It was also practiced for pleasure and for health, and many young males — including the king — and some females would spend their free time practicing it.

== Transition to recreational sport ==
Standard gungdo target

In 1899, the visiting Prince Heinrich of Prussia expressed his astonishment to Emperor Gojong at a traditional archery demonstration. The Prince, hailing from a militarized Prussian culture, sought out demonstrations of Korean martial arts, and Archery was the most impressive among the arts demonstrated. He was familiar with Turkish and Hungarian Archery of Europe, which were similar to Korean Archery. Prince Heinrich suggested making the art into a national sport. The emperor, convinced by the Prince, decreed "let people enjoy archery to develop their physical strength" and established an archery club. In the subsequent standardization of Korean archery, the nature of the bow and the arrow was standardized, as was the range of the targets. Korean traditional archery now uses one specific type of composite bow, bamboo arrows, and a standard target at a standard distance of 120 bo (about 145 m or 160 yards). Korean Archery as a sport developed under the Japanese Occupation, its textbook, "Joseon eui Goongdo" being published in 1920.

Tradition says that a noted general of the Joseon Dynasty settled in Yecheon about 300 years ago, and handed down his expertise and knowledge. "Today, it is estimated that bowyers from Yecheon and its environs produce approximately 70% of Korea's traditional horn composite bows ...Yecheon has produced numerous Olympic medalists and world champion archers". The city has the Jinho International Archery Field.

== Construction and competition ==
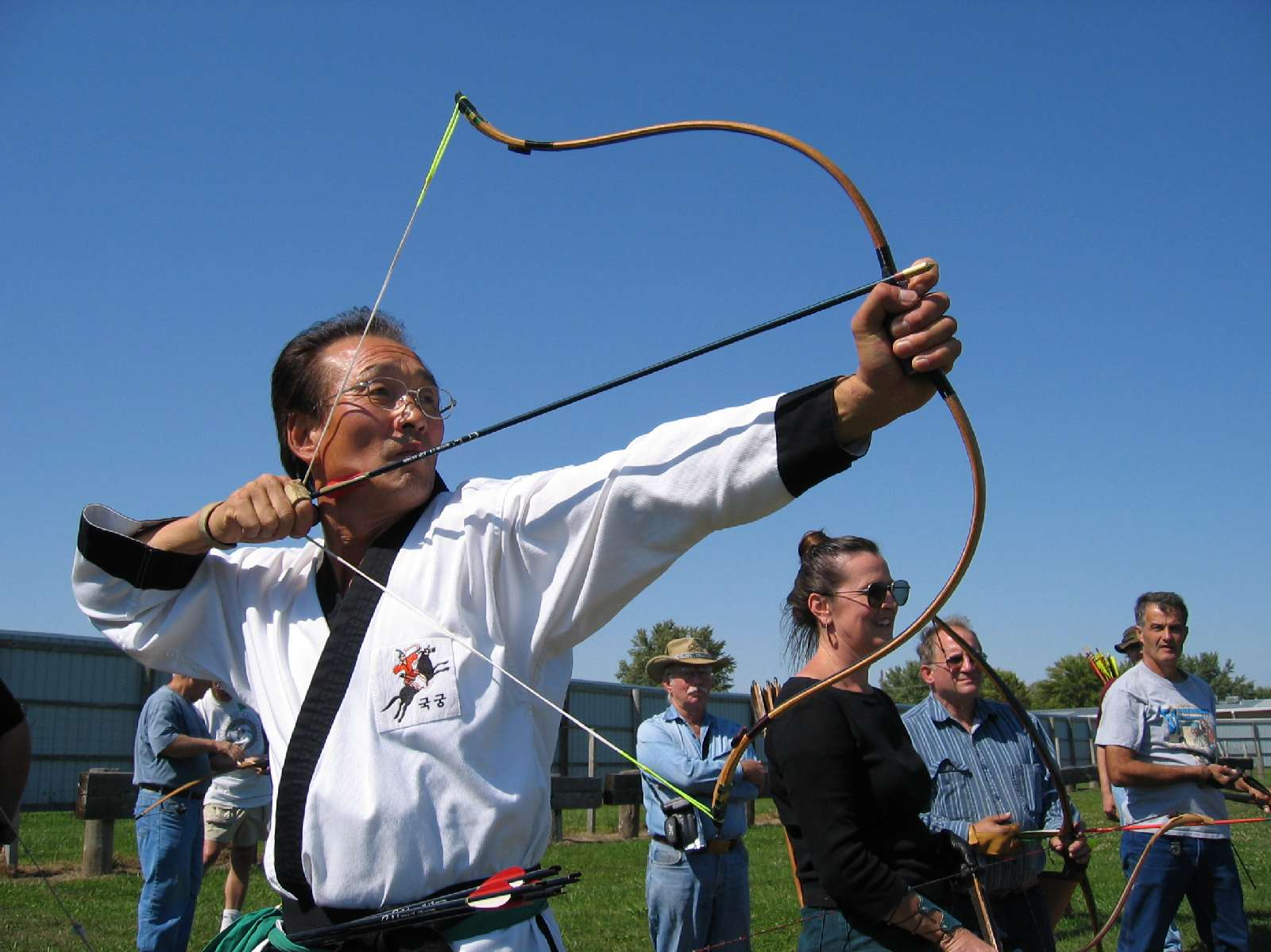
Master Heon Kim

The Gakgung is a highly reflexed version of the classic Eurasian composite bow. The core is bamboo with sinew backed to prevent the bow breaking and to add a pulling strength to the limbs, with oak at the handle. On the belly is water buffalo horn which significantly increases the power by pushing the limbs. This combination of horn which pushes from the belly and sinew that pulls from the back is the defining strength of the bow. The siyahs, the stiffened outer ends of the limbs, are made of either mulberry or black locust and V-spliced onto the bamboo. The glue is made from isinglass. Over the sinew backing is a special birch bark that is imported from Northeast China. It is soaked in sea water for about one year. It is applied to the back using diluted rubber cement (using benzene as the solvent). No sights or other modern attachments are used.

The draw weights vary, but most are above twenty kilograms (approximately 44 pounds). A modern version is made of laminated fiberglass; for most competitions, either bow may be used, with carbon-fiber arrows, but for national competitions, only the composite bow and bamboo arrows may be used. Korean archers have also been very successful in Olympic and other competitions with more modern types of bow.

The sukgung, a kind of crossbow, and the Gak-gung are small but very powerful bows. A sukgung can shoot up to 400 m (440 yards) while a Gak-gung can shoot up to 350 m (380 yards).

The art of constructing traditional Korean bows was designated an important Intangible Cultural Property in 1971.

== See also ==
- Chinese bow
- Composite bow
- Japanese bow
- Mongol bow
- Turkish archery
- Pyeonjeon
- Singijeon
- Kwon Museok - gakgung artisan and Korean intangible cultural asset
