= Seungmu =

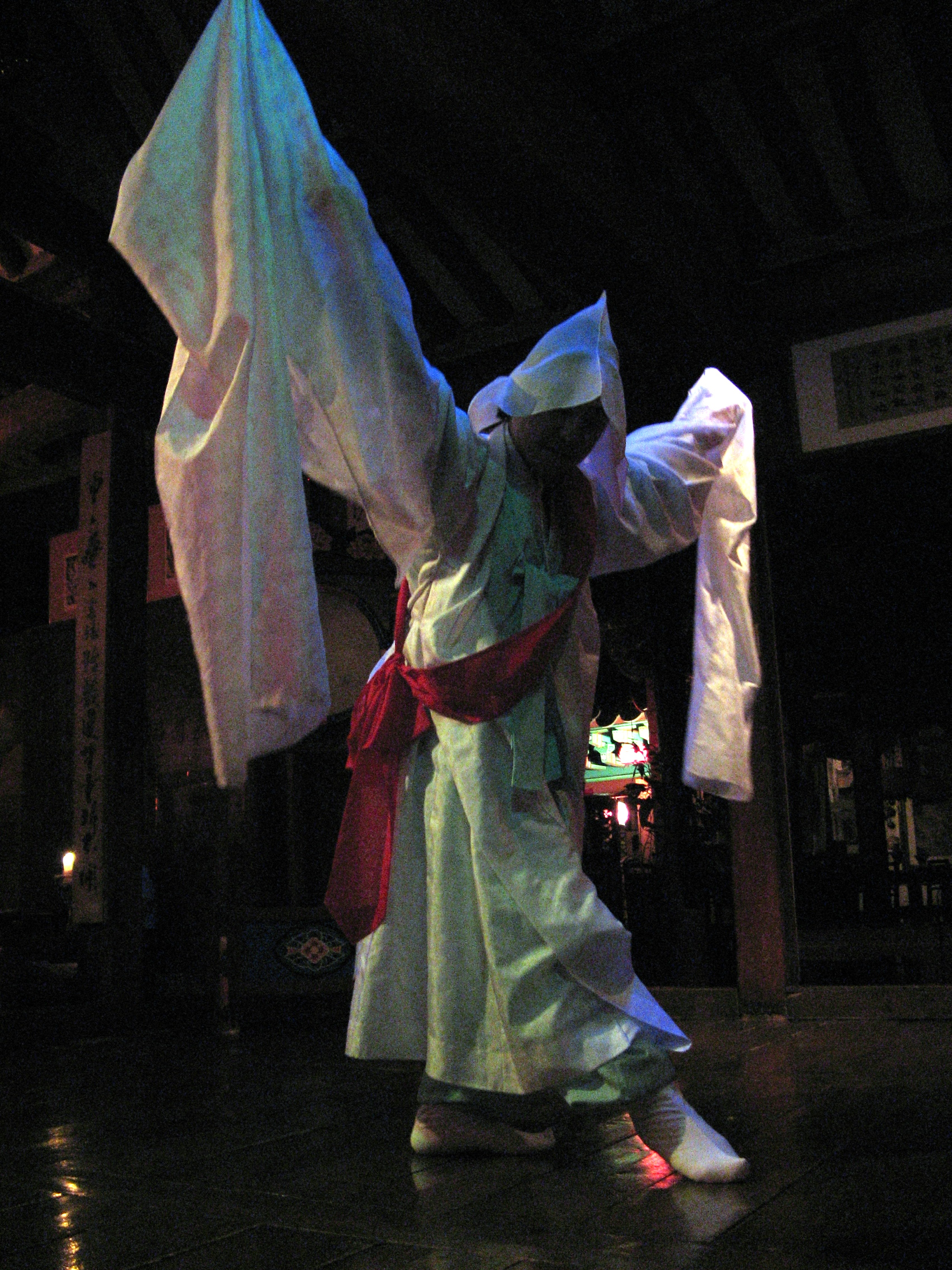

Korean name
- Hangul: 승무
- Hanja: 僧舞
- RR: seungmu
- MR: sŭngmu

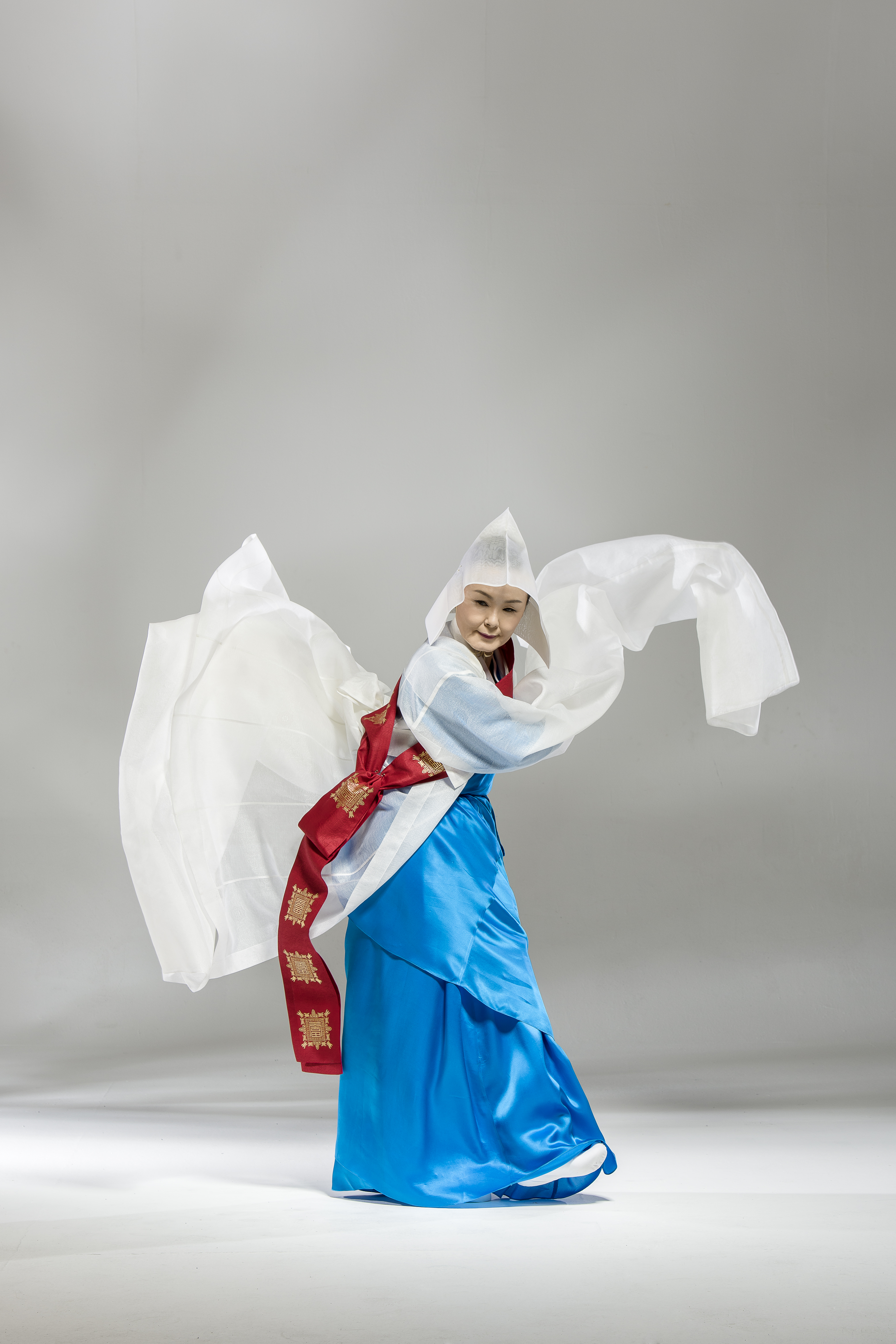
Kim Myo Seon performing Seungmoo in traditional costume called Changsam

Seungmu is a Korean dance performed by Buddhist monks. It is one of the most famous Korean traditional dances and designated as South Korea's important intangible cultural asset number 27 in 1969. It has been developed into a solo dance by professional dancers.

== Origins ==
There is little extant evidence regarding how Seungmu was created. Seungmu is a dance that origins are traced back to Korea. But there is no known exact origin of where the dance could have originated. However, there are many suggestions of where this dance could have formed. It is believed that a wandering monk called Wonhyo had some connection to the creation of the monk’s dance (Seungmu). In addition, to Wonhyo, some others or circumstances could have been the progenitors of this dance. Some scholars suggest that this dance originated from “mocking upper-class priests who repeated certain bodily gestures when they were engaged in Buddhist teaching or disciplinary activity”. Eventually, the dance gained popularity during the sixteenth century. Some believed the dance originated then by a celebrated courtesan called Hwang Chin’i.

Even though there is no easy way to pinpoint how the dance links to Buddhist cultural tradition. The monk’s dance (Seungmu) was never distinctly featured in traditional Buddhist dance performances, but it is hardly separable from Buddhist traditions. The characteristics of the dance, such as hand and feet motion, share commonalities with Buddhist rituals. Based on analyses of forms and movements of Seungmu, some researchers have suggested that it may have derived from other Buddhist ritual dances or ethnic or folk dances. Some said that Seungmu came from bubgo dance, a Buddhist ritual dance. But it is known that the dance is a form of art that strayed away from Buddhist halls to secular streets. The dance communicated to the public in a casual manner that was aesthetical. This separated traditional Buddhism from Korean Buddhism.

Once prohibited during the Joseon dynasty era, it was transformed into a folk dance and developed for the most part by kisaengs. As Korea started to modernize, the dance became more art over ritual. In 1968, Kim Chʼŏnhong and Hong Yunsik’s investigatory report on the origin of the monk’s dance was that it had no connection to Buddhist temples. Due to the dance being used to please commoners to mitigate suffering the dance was labeled as “folk art”. Seungmu was popular among the streets and was street art that became stage art. In 1936, Han Sŏngjun, refashioned the monk’s dance from street art into stage art, transforming it into minsok yesul (folk art). Due to the dance never being a part of any Buddhist traditions or institutions, the dance was able to be considered “folk art” instead of religious dance. The dance Seungmu stood on it is own as minsok yesul and became the 27th intangible treasure of Korean culture.

== Forms ==
The dancer wears a robe (jangsam) with long sleeve called gasa and white hood called (gokkal). The drum or bubgo is the most important part of Seungmu.

The seungmu integrates the eight rhythmic cycles: yeombul, dodeuri, taryeong, jajin taryeong, gutgeori, dwit gutgeori, gujeong nori, and saesanjo. Every now and then, when one rhythm shifts to another, the dancer changes the mood by changing his steps.

The dance and rhythm were mainly improvised in variegated forms in different regions until the 1930s when various styles were archived and choreographed, and some of the performances were officially listed as cultural assets since the 1960s. For example, the general plot of the rhythmic cycles would proceed as follows:

(Cycle 1, 2) Yeombul, Dodeuri: The birth of the universe and the trinity of sky, earth and man. The rhythm is heavy and slow, the dancer starts crouched on the ground and slowly and powerfully expands his/her motion to describe the expansion of the universe.

(Cycle 3) Taryeong: The four azimuths (north, south, east, west) are created. Labor begins, and the world starts working. The rhythm changes to four beats (dun-ttak-duntta-kun), the dance introduces basic moves.

(Cycle 4, 5) Jajin Taryeong, Gutgeori: Flowers bloom and the dance describes the beautiful course of life blooming. The rhythm becomes more sophisticated and so does the dance, symbolizing the myriad forms of life (birth, growth, aging, death), of the seasons (spring, summer, autumn, winter), of human emotions (joy, wrath, sorrow, comfort).

(Cycle 6) Jajinmori, Hwimori: Time goes on, fruits ripen, life matures as it endures the changes. The drum beats faster toward a climax.

(Cycle 7) Dangak: Harsh wind thrashes down the fruits of life and life falls into nothingness.

(Cycle 8) Gutgeori: The return to the beginning and recovery of the original state.

The flares of the white elongated sleeves amplify the dancer's expression, at times describing the whirls of the galaxy, the winds of the azimuths, the blooming or drooping of life, the gesture of sowing and reaping crops, etc.

== Aesthetic ==
The dance is highly dignified and graceful. Some regard Seungmu as the most beautiful Korean dance, for the mixture of flowing movements and stillness. When viewed by the public, one feels an elaborateness and dignity that is strong, dynamic, and sharp. The dancer expresses themselves through their noble and elegant motions and emotions. As they embody an aesthetic concept, they express their passion through their face and the dance itself, which tells a story of resentment or ecstasy. The costume worn during Seungmu is radiant with color, and the lines are elegant. The dancer's long and white sleeves movements, the serenity of white hood, a breathtaking pause, and then a soul-stirring motion contribute to the singular uniqueness of the seungmu.

== Famous performers ==
As with many of Korea's Intangible National Treasures, Seungmoo has been preserved by Human Cultural Treasures. The performers themselves are considered Intangible National Treasures of Korea. Until recently, this dance was preserved by Master Lee Mae Bang, who died in 2015. Currently the position for next Human Cultural Treasure has yet to be decided by the Korean Government.

- Lee Mae Bang, National Human Treasure, for Intangible Cultural Asset No. 27 and 97.
- Kim Myo Seon, Master Assistant of Intangible Cultural Asset No. 27.
- Kim Myung Ja, Master Assistant of Intangible Cultural Asset No. 27.
- Han Young-suk, Master of Korean Dance from 1969, including seungmu.

== See also ==
- Korean culture
- Korean Buddhism
- Korean Buddhist temple
