= Daemokjang =

Style of traditional Korean wooden architecture

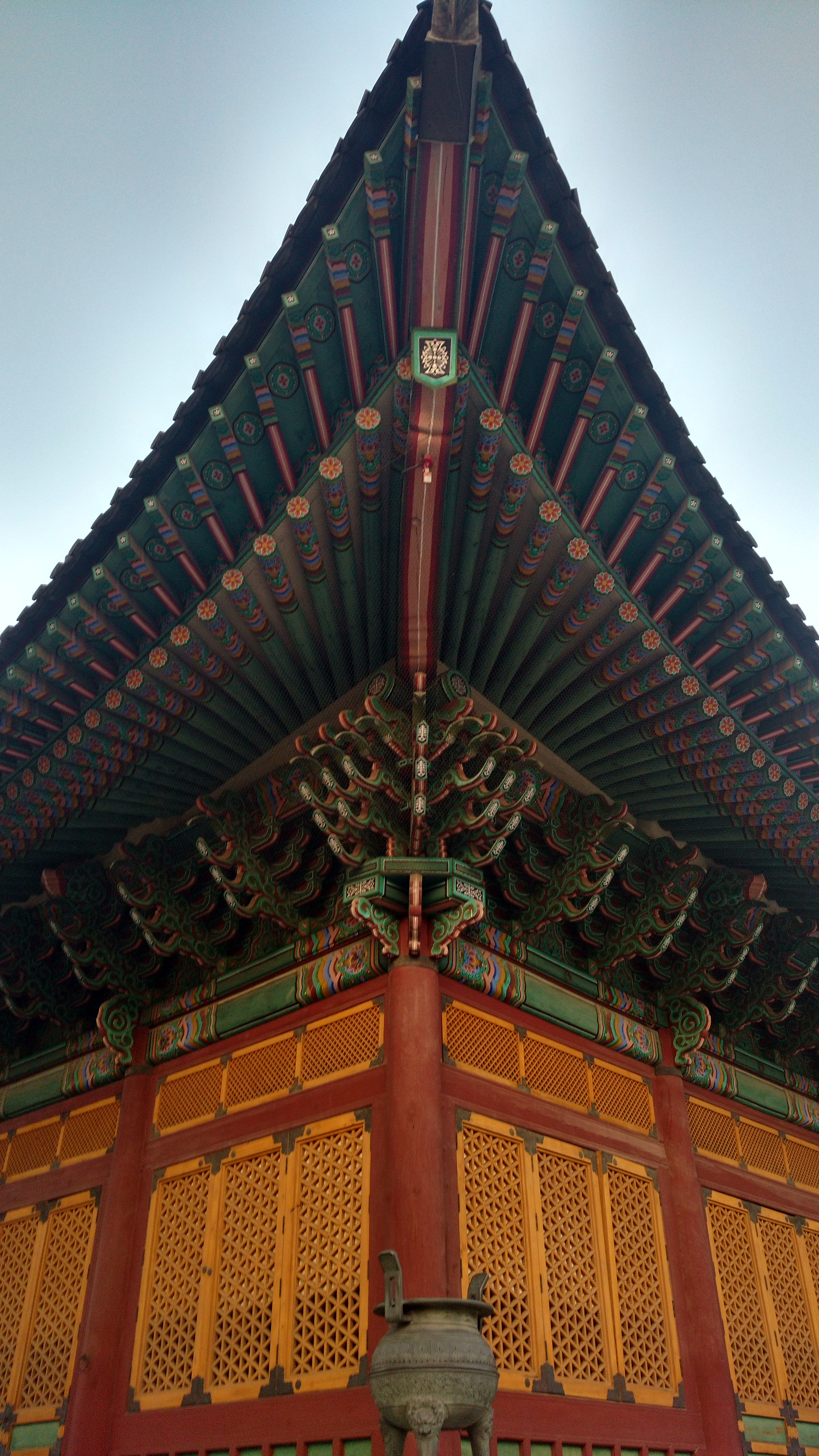
The work of a Daemokjang

Daemokjang (Korean: 대목장; alternatively Daimokjang) is a style of traditional Korean wooden architecture and a term for the woodworking artisans who create it. The word literally means carpenter. Mokjang means woodworker, and are divided into Somokjang (lit. lesser woodworker) and Daemokjang (lit. greater woodworker). Somokjang who make small wooden objects are joiners; Daemokjang who builds wooden buildings are carpenters. Daemokjang covers the entire field of woodworking and the entire construction process.

== History ==
Daemokjang builders acquire skills through education and practice. At times, the Daemokjang were treated with prestige, and were offered governmental positions. The "Daemokjang Architectural Method and Theorem" originated in Korea during the Joseon Dynasty. However, towards the end of that dynasty (in the 18th century), the term declined in usage. Instead, their surnames changed to 'Fiansu', and other artisans became known as 'Dofiansu'. Their job was to teach and oversee the construction of government buildings and temples.

== Architecture ==
One of Daemokjang's many domains is home construction. This begins with shaving bark off the wood, followed by drawing lines on the timber and other elements to be cut and carved. Pillars of multiple types are then fitted on top of the foundation stones, all of which are laid with a plan for the building's curved roof. These traditional construction techniques require design skills and aesthetic sense (to select construction materials). Their skill and aesthetic sense allow the Daemokjang to create the so-called "joints that withstand a millennium".

According to Choi Gi-Yeong, winter was the most useful time for Daemokjang to construct Hanok. The builders' job was first to finish all the required work on the floor before winter came, as ice damages the wood through cutting and drying. Roof tiles were then laid sometime before late June, when precipitation became heavy, and plastering was preferably completed in August, before the start of Chuseok. During this time, dew forms on the walls every morning and dries throughout the day. This reduces the chance of cracks inside the walls.

== Recognition ==
The UNESCO World Heritage List included 'Changdeokgung Palace and Bulguksa Temple as examples of traditional Korean architecture constructed by the Daemokjang.

Daemokjang and their historical significance to Korea have been safeguarded as national cultural heritage since the official 74th Important Intangible Cultural Properties of Korea designation in 1982. Master carpenter Bae Hee-Han was designated as the holder of the role in 1982.

== Present day ==
These craftsmen reside and work across Korea. Sin-Eung-Su works in Gangneung-si, Gangwon-do. Jeon Heung-Su lives and works in Deoksan-myeon, Yesan-gun, and Chumgcheongnam-do. Choi-Gi-Yeong works in Namyangju-si, Gyeonggi-do.

Choi-Gi-Yeong is one of the three prominent Daemokjang architects still alive in Korea. His contribution to the project of restoring the historical Buddhist monasteries is notable. The South Korean government awarded him the title of Intangible Cultural Heritage.

Geungnakjeon Hall at Bongjeongsa Temple in Andong, Gyeongsangbuk-do province (built in the 1200th century) is nationally preserved. Choi demolished the wooden building and rebuilt it.

Hanok wooden architectural structures are naturally built, and they are created by artists who adhere to principles and fundamentals. All of the elements utilized in construction come from natural sources: Korean pine, clay, stones, tiles, and window paper–all cultivated from nature. Pinewood tends to breathe, and its resin flows into the Hanok. Thus, the house "breathes." The whole process was done based on traditional and scientific principles, and it is said that this contributes to the longevity of their constructions.
