= Gintaras Ramonas =

Lithuanian politician

Gintaras Ramonas (6 November 1962 – 11 November 1997) was a Lithuanian politician. In 1990, he was among those who signed the Act of the Re-Establishment of the State of Lithuania in 1990.
