= Jules Henriet =

Belgian footballer

Personal information
- Full name: Jules Pierre Henriet
- Date of birth: 13 February 1918
- Place of birth: Gosselies Belgium
- Date of death: 27 November 1997 (aged 79)
- Place of death: Montigny-le-Tilleul Belgium
- Positions: Midfielder; defender

Senior career*
Years	Team	Apps	(Gls)
1934–1936	Gosselies Sports	??	(??)
1936–1938	RCS de Schaerbeek	49	(14)
1938–1956	Sporting Charleroi	233	(4)
1956–1958	RAEC Mons	47	(2)
Total		329	(20)

International career
1940–1949	Belgium	15	(0)

Managerial career
- 1956–1959: RAEC Mons
- * Club domestic league appearances and goals

Jules Henriet (13 February 1918 – 27 November 1997), was a Belgian football player. He evolved from midfielder to defender in Sporting Charleroi and the Belgium national football team. He played 15 matches with the Red Devils between 1940 and 1949, during which he was 8 times captain in charge. He play 233 games and score 4 goals in the highest Level.

He ended his career as trainer-player in RAEC Mons from 1956 to 1959.
