= Living National Treasure (South Korea) =

Humans associated with Korean culture

- Hangul: 인간문화재 (중요무형문화재보유자)
- Hanja: 人間文化財 (重要無形文化財保有者)
- Revised Romanization: Inganmunhwajae (Jungyomuhyeongmunhwajaeboyuja)
- McCune–Reischauer: Inkanmunhwachae (Chungyomuhyŏngmunhwachaepoyucha)

A Living National Treasure (Korean: 인간 문화재; RR: ingan munhwajae; lit. human cultural asset) is a South Korean popular term for those individuals certified as Holders of Important Intangible Cultural Properties (중요 무형 문화재 보유자), also known as keepers, by the Ministry of Education as based on South Korea's Law for the Protection of Cultural Properties (문화재 보호법). The term "Living National Treasure" is not formally mentioned in the law, but is an informal term referencing the cultural properties designated as the National Treasures.

== History ==
The government started taking steps after the Second World War and the Korean War to protect the intangible heritage of the country.

The term was coined in 1960 by the young reporter Ye Yong-hae, who published a number of series in the Hankook Ilbo newspaper, highlighting the plight of artisans and artists who were either neglected or even persecuted under the regime of President Park under the Misin tapa undong modernization drive that was destroying the old traditional beliefs and fabrics of villages. In a growing recognition of the worthiness of protecting the old Korean traditions and culture, a law was passed to protect the intangible cultural heritages and the masters and artisans who were keeping it alive.

Over time the number of keepers of this heritage grew, but the list was also subject to criticism about the exact criteria and nomination process.

The latest Important Intangible Cultural Property is bun-wa-jang, a traditional Korean roof building skill, which was designated in 2008. With the designation, Lee Geon-bok was approved as an ingan-munhwajae in 2008. According to Jeon Byung-hon of the Democratic Party, twelve Important Intangible Cultural Properties of Korea have not had any ingan-munhwajae for more than 10 years.

== Definition ==
A Living National Treasure is a person with the ability to make or perform one of the officially designated Important Intangible Cultural Properties. Intangible culture assets are organized within 108 different aspects of Korean traditional culture, from traditional dance to building techniques. The ministry draws the list and puts the artist under its protection. It is advised by the Cultural Heritage Administration under the Cultural Properties Protection Law. Once people are designated as an holders, they have rights to government support for transmission of their cultural performance and have responsibility to show that ability and train younger students. The designation expires with his or her death.

== List ==
Presently it has designated a total of 570 holders of these intangible properties.

- Han Bongnyeo (한복려; 韓福麗), chef, holder of Intangible Cultural Property No. 38 (Korean royal court cuisine)
- Jung Gwan-Chae, dyer, holder of Intangible Cultural Property No. 115 (yeomsaek)
- Kim Bak-young (김박영; 金博榮), bowmaker, holder of Intangible Cultural Property No. 47 (gakgung) a
- Kim Deokhwan (김덕환; 金德煥), gold leaf artisan, holder of Intangible Cultural Property No. 199 (geumbak)
- Kim Se-yong (김세용, 世昌 金世龍), celadon ceramist, No. 349.
- Kim Sook-ja, salpuri dancer, official guardian of Intangible Cultural Property No. 97.
- Kim Tong Yon, bamboo craftsman
- Kim Youngjae, musician, holder of Intangible Cultural Property No.16 (geomungo sanjo)
- Lee Ju-hwan, holder of Intangible Cultural Property No. 30 and 41
- Song Deok-Gi (송덕기; 宋德基), one of the last practitioners of traditional martial arts, holder of Intangible Cultural Property No. 76 (Taekkyon)
- Yu Geun-Hyeong (유근형; 柳根瀅), ceramist, holder of Intangible Cultural Property No.13 (Koryo Celadon)
- Kwon Museok, a recognized artisan of Gungdo
- Bae Hee-han (배희한; 裵喜漢), master carpenter, holder of Intangible Cultural Property No. 74 (Daemokjang)

== See also ==
- Heritage preservation in South Korea
- Living National Treasure (Japan)
