= Lee Ju-hwan =

Lee Ju-hwan (Korean: 이주환; Hanja: 李珠煥; April 10, 1909 – December 2, 1972) was an Ingan-munhwage of Korean traditional song, Gangtok, which is the 41st Important Intangible Cultural Properties of Korea. He is also a master of gasa, which is Korean traditional literature that is an intermediate form of poetry and prose and Lee Ju-hwan is designated as Ingan-munhwage of 30th Important Intangible Cultural Properties of Korea gasa either. He used Sonam (Korean: 소남(韶南)) as a pseudonym.

== Biography ==
Lee Ju-hwan was born on the 24th day, 5th month of 1909 in Jongno District, Keijō (Seoul), Korea, Empire of Japan. He was the second son of Lee Gik-sang and Choi Game-yeo. His original name was Bok-Gil (Korean: 복길(福吉);). In March 1928, he graduated Gyodong public elementary school and entered Part of the aakbuwon Training Center of the yiwangjik aakbu as the 3rd group in April. At that time yiwangjik aakbu gathered students every 5 years and the 3rd group has only 18 members. Sung Kyung-lin, Lee Seok-Jae, Bong Hae-song, Kim Bo-nam, Kim Young-un are all his alumni in yiwangjik aakbu 3rd members. when he was 3rd grade at yiwangjik aakbu, he made Jeonakhoe (Korean: 전악회(展樂會);), which was a group for restoration of aak, traditional music during the Royal ceremony, with his friends. One month before graduating the yiwangjik aakbu, he married Shin Chang-hee in February 1931. In March 1931, he graduated with honors and was designated as an asks (Korean: 아악수 (雅樂手);) who is an aak player. On August 26, 1935, his wife Shin Chang-hee died. He started transcript Yeochang ago after his wife's death and became the head of aak in November 1937. After the independence of Korea, he started to teach Korean dance as an instructor at the yiwangjik aakbu practice room and he also tried to spread ago and Sijo, Korean traditional poetry.

== Career ==
In 1928, organizing Jeonakhoe (Korean: 전악회(展樂會);) for the restoration of aak In April 1931, becoming the head of Baku (Korean: 아악수 (雅樂手);) in 1933, making advice to transfer the format of Jeongganbo In 1935, completed the transcription of Nanchang ago In August 1945, becoming the Director of Liberal Arts in former royal aakbu From April 1, 1962, to September 1, 1972, Korean music instructor in Gukaksa school(currently is the Jukka highschool) In February 1971, establishing ago and gasa school

== Awards ==
In May 1958, winning the 7th Seoul culture award In July 1971, winning the Academy of Arts award 1958.5. 제7회 서울시 문화상 수상
