= Allan Jinks =

Australian cricketer

Personal information
- Born: 29 December 1913; Carlton, Melbourne, Australia
- Died: 7 November 1997 (aged 83); Melbourne, Australia
- Batting: Right-handed
- Bowling: Right-arm off-break

Domestic team information
- Years: Team
- 1935/36–1947/48: Victoria
- Source: Cricinfo, 22 November 2015

Allan Jinks (29 December 1913 – 7 November 1997) was an Australian cricketer. He played eight first-class cricket matches for Victoria between the 1935–36 season and 1947–48.
