= Bae Hee-han =

South Korean master carpenter (1907-1997)

- Hangul: 배희한
- Hanja: 裵喜漢
- RR: Bae Huihan
- MR: Pae Hŭihan

Bae Hee-han (Korean: 배희한; Hanja: 裵喜漢; June 19, 1907 - November 5, 1997) was a South Korean master carpenter who built hanok. He built the Donamjang house. In 1982, he was designated as the holder of Daemokjang (대목장(大木匠)), the 74th South Korean Important Intangible Cultural Property.

== Life ==
He was born in Seoul, on June 10, 1907. (The family register indicates 1909.) In 1923, when he was 17, he quit Seonrin Commercial High School and became apprenticed to the Japanese carpenter Oda. In 1921, before quitting his studies, he had already started working as a carpenter at the Railway Bureau of the Japanese Government-General of Korea . At the age of 18, he received traditional carpentry lessons from Choi Won-shik, who was the great carpenter of the Royal palace, at the demolition site of Daejojeon Hall. He built many houses for high-ranking officials, such as the Sarangchae for Min Yeong-hwi 's house in Samcheong-dong. In 1939, at the age of 31, he built Donamjang, the home of former eunuch Song Seong-jin, and home to Syngman Rhee for two years.

In 1959, after liberation from Japanese colonial rule, he repaired Haejungjeong and Hyangwonjeong Pavilion in Gyeongbokgung Palace, and built many temple buildings. In December 1980, he was recognized as a traditional carpentry craftsman through the 《Special Extended Exhibition of Woodworking》 held at the National Folk Museum of Korea, and in 1982, he became a master of intangible cultural heritage. He died on November 5, 1997.

Bae Hee-han did not fight or drink alcohol unlike his mentor, nor did he earn much money. He himself said, "There is no original money coming to people who live off dead trees."^{:182}

== Work ==
Bae Hee-han is often called "the last Joseon carpenter" because he studied under Choi Won-sik, the last carpenter of the Joseon royal family. Painter Kim Byeong-jong evaluates Bae Hee-han's architecture as simple but solid and thorough.^{:177} Hanoks he built include the following.

- 1927 Kim Ik-bae Brothers House
- Kim Jae-eun's house in 1935
- 1936 Old Yuseong Villa
- 1939 Donamjang (Song Seong-jin's house)
- Choi Gi-tae's house in 1940
- 1942 Choi Chang-hak House
- 1966 Yeomburam, Gwacheon, Gyeonggi-do
- 1967 Long Temple, Seongbuk-dong, Seoul
- 1969 Guamsa Temple in Bongcheon-dong
- 1974 Naval Academy Patriotic History
- Seo Se-ok House in 1976
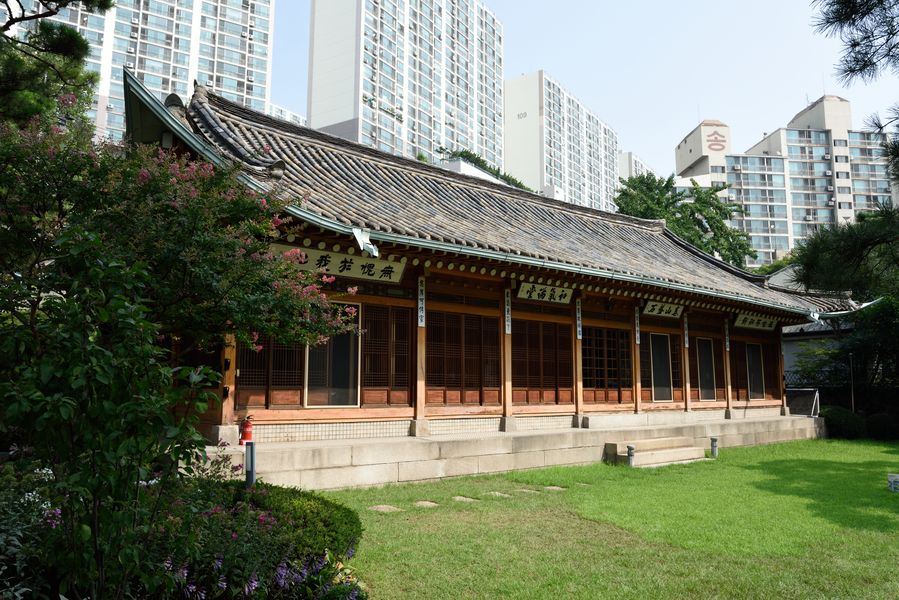
Donamjang House

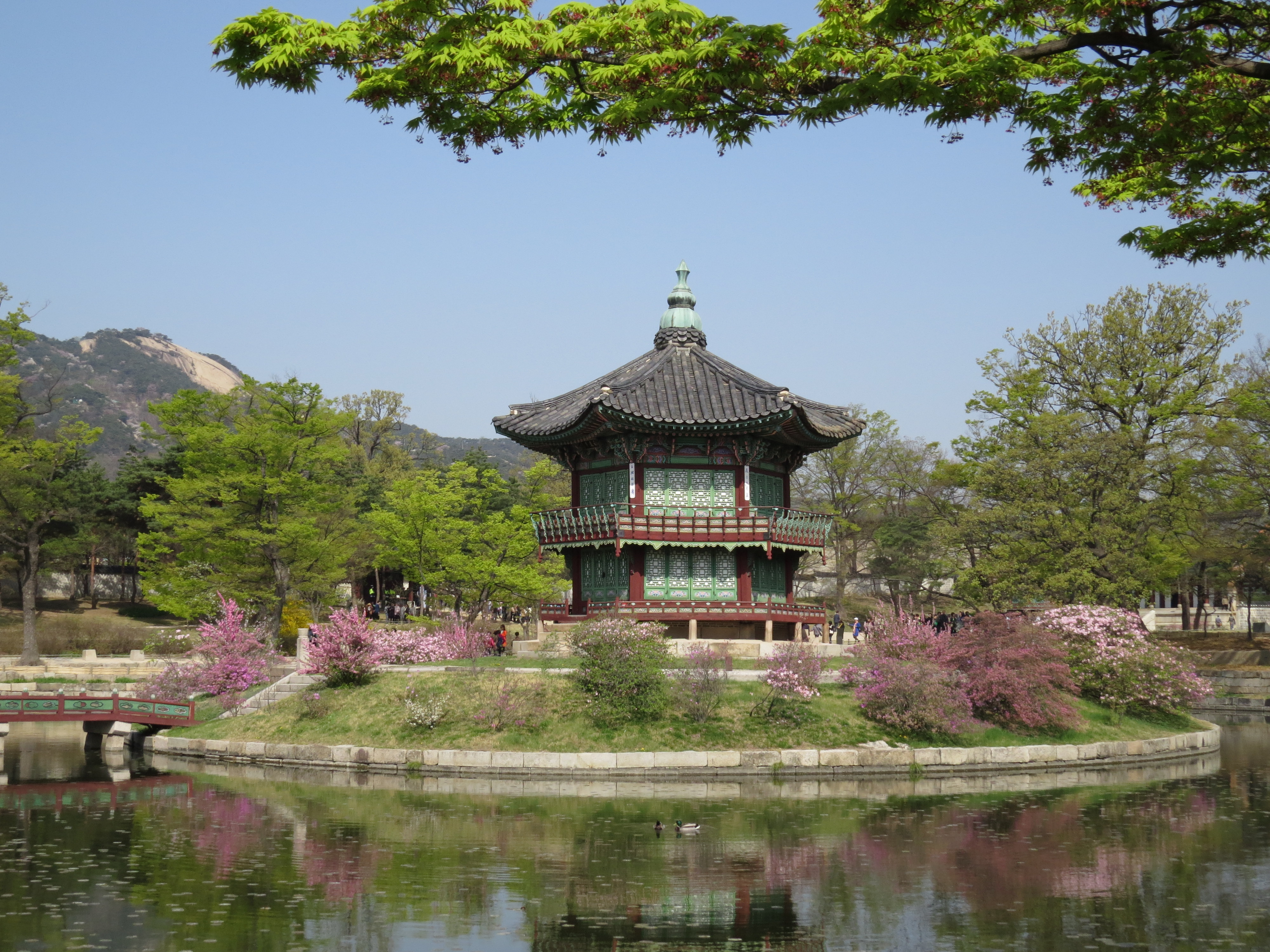
Hyangwonjeong Pavilion, Gyeongbokgung Palace

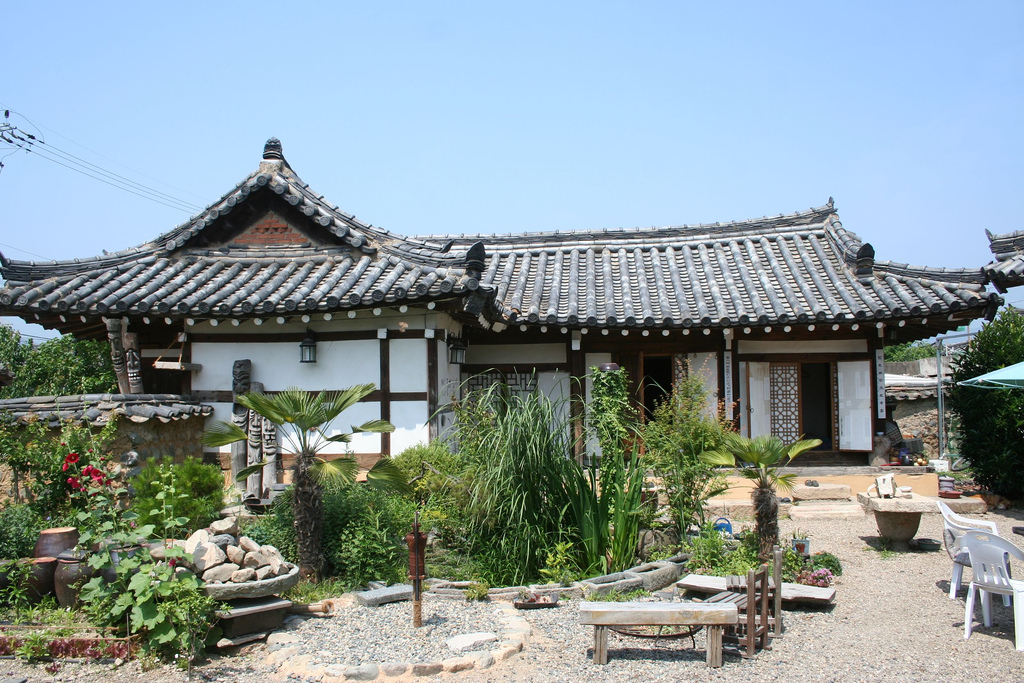
Sarangchae

== Disciples ==
Go Taek-young, who learned carpentry from him, was designated as a master builder in 1997 (holder of Daemokjang (대목장(大木匠)), the 74th South Korean Important Intangible Cultural Property).
