= Pat Grace =

Australian rules footballer

Personal information
- Full name: Martin Norman William Grace
- Born: 28 May 1924
- Died: 17 November 1997 (aged 73); Wagga Wagga, New South Wales
- Original team: Howlong
- Height: 185 cm (6 ft 1 in)
- Weight: 83 kg (183 lb)

Playing career^{1}
Years	Club	Games (Goals)
1944	South Melbourne	4 (0)
- ^{1} Playing statistics correct to the end of 1944.

Martin Norman William "Pat" Grace (28 May 1924 – 17 November 1997) was an Australian rules footballer who played with South Melbourne in the Victorian Football League (VFL).

Grace was recruited from the Howlong Football Club.
