= Battle of Ulsan =

Battle of Ulsan may refer to:

- Battle off Ulsan (1904) between Japan and Russia, off Ulsan, Yeongnam, South Korea
- Siege of Ulsan (early 1598) between Joseon and Japan, at Ulsan, Yeongnam, South Korea
- Second siege of Ulsan (late 1598) between Joseon and Japan, at Ulsan, Yeongnam, South Korea
