= Vilmos Iváncsó =

Hungarian volleyball player (1939–1997)

Personal information
- Nationality: Hungarian
- Born: 23 February 1939 Chust, Czechoslovakia
- Died: 25 November 1997 (aged 58) Budapest, Hungary

Sport
- Sport: Volleyball

Vilmos Iváncsó (23 February 1939 – 25 November 1997) was a Hungarian volleyball player. He competed in the men's tournament at the 1964 Summer Olympics.
