= List of Belgium international footballers (5–20 caps) =

The Belgium national football team represents the country of Belgium in international association football. It is fielded by the Royal Belgian Football Association, the governing body of football in Belgium, and competes as a member of the Union of European Football Associations (UEFA), which encompasses the countries of Europe.

This list contains all players with between 5 and 20 appearances for the national team. For a list of players with 21 or more caps, see List of Belgium international footballers, other players are listed at List of Belgium international footballers (1–4 caps).

== Players ==
Key
	Named to the national team in the past year
Bold	Still playing competitive football
#x	Played in one or more friendlies which are not FIFA-recognised, either due to an excessive number of substitutions according to the Laws of the Game or because the request to have a match treated as official was sent too late to the FIFA. Three matches currently fall under this category, namely the friendlies against Romania on 14 November 2012, against Luxembourg on 26 May 2014 and against Czech Republic on 5 June 2017. These three matches are recognised by the Belgian FA and therefore included in this list. The number besides the '#' symbol denotes the number of disputed matches for each player.
§x	Played one or more matches for Belgium at the 1920, 1924 or 1928 Summer Olympics, which are not counted as official matches by the Belgian FA and therefore not included in this list. Note that no caps were given for the 1920 Final as FIFA has not released the report of this game and on the official website it is stated that the game was abandoned, without any official result posted. The number besides the '§' symbol denotes the number of matches not counted for each player.

Appearances and goals are composed of FIFA World Cup and UEFA European Championship matches and each competition's required qualification matches, as well as UEFA Nations League matches and numerous international friendly tournaments and matches. Statistics correct as of 7 August 2018.

Belgium national team football players with between 5 and 20 appearances
Rank	Player	Caps	Selections	Goals	Minutes played	Date of debut	Debut against	Date of last match	Last match against	Ref.
159	Léon Aernaudts	20	22	0	1169	7 Apr 1947	Netherlands	5 Mar 1950	Italy	
159	Frédéric Chaves d'Aguilar	20	24	8	1800	23 Jan 1946	Scotland	20 May 1951	Scotland	
159	**Laurent Ciman**	20	68	1	1495	19 May 2010	Bulgaria	6 Jun 2018	Egypt	
159	**Olivier Deschacht**	20	34	0	1169	30 Apr 2003	Poland	12 Jun 2015	Wales	
159	Karel Geraerts	20	25	4	1059	17 Aug 2005	Greece	17 Nov 2009	Qatar	
159	Henri Larnoe ^{§2}	20	20	9	1800	31 Aug 1920	Netherlands	3 May 1925	Netherlands	
159	Guillaume Raskin	20	24	0	1800	28 Feb 1960	France	3 May 1964	Portugal	
159	Ivan Thys	20	21	7	1710	6 Mar 1921	France	20 Jun 1926	France	
167	Henri Coppens	19	28	4	1710	13 May 1945	Luxembourg	6 Nov 1949	Netherlands	
167	Jean Cornelis	19	31	1	1710	2 Dec 1962	Spain	6 Mar 1968	West Germany	
167	Alfons De Winter	19	19	0	1690	30 May 1935	Switzerland	5 Jun 1938	France	
167	François Demol	19	19	0	1620	5 Oct 1924	Denmark	26 May 1927	Czechoslovakia	
167	Philibert Smellinckx	19	20	0	1710	22 Oct 1933	Germany	27 Feb 1938	Netherlands	
167	Joos Valgaeren	19	22	0	1476	23 Feb 2000	Portugal	20 Aug 2003	Netherlands	
167	Marc Van der Linden	19	22	8	1140	31 May 1983	France	21 Jun 1990	Spain	
174	Émile Andrieu	18	18	0	1680	30 Apr 1905	Netherlands	9 Mar 1913	Netherlands	
174	Gustave Boesman ^{§3}	18	18	0	1620	14 Feb 1926	Hungary	26 May 1929	France	
174	Jean Caudron ^{§1}	18	19	0	1620	5 Oct 1924	Denmark	15 Apr 1928	France	
174	Henri Leroy	18	18	0	1533	12 Apr 1908	France	9 Mar 1919	France	
174	Raymond Mommens	18	47	0	1137	16 Nov 1977	Northern Ireland	26 Mar 1988	Hungary	
174	Johnny Thio	18	25	6	1484	27 Oct 1965	Bulgaria	22 May 1972	Iceland	
174	Sven Vermant	18	22	0	833	7 Oct 1995	Armenia	4 Sep 2004	Lithuania	
181	Roger Claessen	17	19	7	1397	20 May 1961	Switzerland	24 Apr 1968	Soviet Union	
181	François Daenen	17	39	0	1460	15 Dec 1945	France	23 Sep 1953	Finland	
181	Leopold Gernaey	17	27	0	1495	8 Oct 1953	Sweden	5 Jun 1957	Iceland	
181	Hector Goetinck	17	17	2	1530	22 Apr 1906	France	1 Nov 1923	England	
181	Gaby Mudingayi	17	21	0	1077	30 Apr 2003	Poland	14 Oct 2009	Estonia	
181	Jacky Peeters	17	27	0	864	4 Sep 1999	Netherlands	21 Aug 2002	Poland	
181	Branko Strupar	17	19	5	964	18 Aug 1999	Finland	10 Jun 2002	Tunisia	
181	Gill Swerts	17	21	1	1310	1 Mar 2006	Luxembourg	14 Oct 2009	Estonia	
181	Guy Vandersmissen	17	20	0	1170	13 Jun 1982	Argentina	23 Sep 1987	Bulgaria	
190	Fernand Buyle	16	16	1	1440	4 Apr 1937	Netherlands	13 May 1945	Luxembourg	
190	Rik Isemborghs	16	16	8	1440	31 Mar 1935	Netherlands	27 May 1939	Poland	
190	Marcel Paeschen	16	22	4	1396	8 Dec 1957	Turkey	3 May 1964	Portugal	
190	Edgard Poelmans	16	16	1	1500	1 May 1904	France	19 Mar 1911	Netherlands	
190	Henri Thellin	16	16	0	1440	2 Mar 1958	West Germany	20 May 1961	Switzerland	
190	Joseph Van Beeck	16	16	7	1418	7 Dec 1930	France	30 May 1935	Switzerland	
190	Gordan Vidovic	16	19	0	1350	7 Jun 1997	San Marino	3 Jun 1999	Japan	
197	Marc Baecke	15	32	0	1038	21 Dec 1977	Italy	5 Sep 1984	Argentina	
197	Marc Hendrikx	15	22	0	662	30 May 1999	Peru	6 Oct 2001	Croatia	
197	Jules Henriet	15	17	0	1350	17 Mar 1940	Netherlands	24 Apr 1949	Republic of Ireland	
197	Joseph Thys	15	15	1	1270	28 Jan 1912	France	9 Mar 1919	France	
197	Gilbert Van Binst	15	23	1	1319	31 Oct 1973	Norway	3 Sep 1977	Iceland	
197	Michel Vanderbauwhede	15	15	7	1350	11 Apr 1926	France	7 Dec 1930	France	
203	Robert Braet	14	15	0	1178	11 Oct 1931	Poland	27 Feb 1938	Netherlands	
203	**Tom De Sutter**	14	15	0	363	20 Aug 2008	Germany	17 Nov 2009	Qatar	
203	Philippe Desmet	14	20	1	1018	5 Sep 1984	Netherlands	14 Oct 1987	Scotland	
203	Michaël Goossens	14	18	1	472	13 Feb 1993	Cyprus	7 Oct 2000	Latvia	
203	Stein Huysegems	14	21	0	346	9 Oct 2004	Spain	31 May 2009	Japan	
203	Henri Van Averbeke ^{§1}	14	14	0	1260	14 Mar 1926	Netherlands	26 May 1929	France	
209	Louis Bessems	13	13	1	1170	16 Feb 1913	France	5 May 1923	England	
209	Roberto Bisconti	13	15	0	527	18 Feb 2004	France	7 Sep 2005	San Marino	
209	Jean Mathonet	13	14	0	1170	25 Dec 1952	France	23 Nov 1958	Hungary	
209	Fernand Nisot ^{§1}	13	14	10	1170	30 Apr 1911	France	26 Apr 1914	Netherlands	
209	Joseph Pannaye	13	15	0	1170	24 Dec 1944	France	21 Sep 1947	England	
209	Bob Peeters	13	18	4	488	25 Feb 1998	United States	7 Sep 2002	Bulgaria	
209	**Sébastien Pocognoli**	13	30	0	598	30 May 2008	Italy	10 Oct 2014	Andorra	
209	**Silvio Proto**	13	22	0	1125	17 Nov 2004	Serbia and Montenegro	9 Feb 2011	Finland	
209	Pascal Renier	13	20	0	1023	3 Jun 1994	Zambia	14 Dec 1996	Netherlands	
209	Gunther Schepens	13	13	3	820	29 Mar 1995	Spain	6 Sep 1999	Netherlands	
209	Jacques Teugels	13	24	1	757	15 Nov 1970	France	5 Sep 1976	Iceland	
209	René Thirifays	13	13	1	1170	23 Feb 1946	Luxembourg	24 Apr 1949	Republic of Ireland	
209	Guillaume Van Den Eynde	13	13	1	1200	1 May 1904	France	28 Jan 1912	France	
209	Leo Van der Elst	13	20	0	597	17 Apr 1984	Poland	1 Apr 1987	Scotland	
209	Kevin Vandenbergh	13	21	3	504	26 Mar 2005	Bosnia and Herzegovina	7 Feb 2007	Czech Republic	
224	Gilbert Bodart	12	55	0	956	23 Apr 1986	Bulgaria	6 Sep 1995	Denmark	
224	Oscar Bossaert	12	12	0	1080	4 Mar 1911	England Amateur	23 Nov 1913	Germany	
224	Jean Brichaut	12	13	3	1080	1 May 1932	France	16 Feb 1936	Poland	
224	Sylvain Brébart	12	12	8	1080	10 Mar 1912	Netherlands	15 Mar 1914	Netherlands	
224	Robert Coppée ^{§3}	12	12	5	1080	9 Mar 1919	France	27 Apr 1924	Netherlands	
224	Bert De Cleyn	12	12	9	1080	19 Jan 1946	England	28 Apr 1948	Scotland	
224	Didier Dheedene	12	16	0	977	28 Feb 2001	San Marino	4 Sep 2004	Lithuania	
224	Robert Maertens	12	14	0	1080	24 Feb 1952	Italy	23 Dec 1956	West Germany	
224	Gerard Plessers	12	17	1	798	19 Dec 1979	Scotland	11 Sep 1985	Poland	
224	**Adnan Januzaj** ^{#1}	12	36	1	491	26 May 2014	Luxembourg	6 June 1919	San Marino	
224	Hector 'Tasson' Raemaekers	12	12	0	1110	30 Apr 1905	Netherlands	4 May 1913	Switzerland	
224	Arsène Vaillant	12	18	1	1037	24 Dec 1944	France	25 Nov 1951	Netherlands	
224	Daniel Veyt	12	26	1	829	20 Nov 1985	Netherlands	27 May 1989	Yugoslavia	
224	**Jelle Vossen** ^{#1}	12	26	2	461	29 May 2009	Chile	19 Nov 2013	Japan	
238	Albert Cluytens	11	15	1	928	21 Dec 1977	Italy	29 Apr 1981	France	
238	Guy Dardenne	11	15	0	681	21 Dec 1977	Italy	6 Jun 1980	Romania	
238	Jean De Clercq	11	12	0	990	13 Apr 1930	France	22 Oct 1933	Germany	
238	Timothy Castagne	11	19	2	861	7 Sep 2018	Scotland	14 Nov 2020	Iceland	
238	Olivier De Cock	11	12	0	698	12 Oct 2002	Andorra	9 Feb 2005	Egypt	
238	Henri De Deken	11	12	0	990	20 Jul 1930	Paraguay	22 Oct 1933	Germany	
238	Georges Hebdin ^{§1}	11	12	0	990	18 Apr 1908	England Amateur	28 Mar 1920	France	
238	Léon Jeck	11	15	0	990	7 Apr 1968	Netherlands	25 Nov 1970	Denmark	
238	Constant Joacim	11	11	0	990	16 May 1931	England	10 Jun 1937	Romania	
238	**Leander Dendoncker**	11	41	0	678	7 Jun 2015	France	11 November 2020	Switzerland	
238	Sandy Martens	11	15	3	551	27 Mar 1999	Bulgaria	10 Sep 2003	Croatia	
238	Armand Seghers	11	20	0	990	25 Dec 1952	France	2 Oct 1960	Netherlands	
238	Jean Trappeniers	11	18	0	944	30 Sep 1964	Netherlands	25 Feb 1970	England	
238	John Van Alphen	11	11	0	990	3 Apr 1938	Netherlands	24 Dec 1944	France	
238	Joseph Van Ingelgem	11	12	0	990	11 Dec 1932	Austria	11 Mar 1934	Netherlands	
238	Louis Vandenbergh	11	11	0	914	8 Jan 1928	Austria	9 Apr 1933	Netherlands	
254	Theo Custers	10	29	0	719	26 Sep 1979	Netherlands	28 Jun 1982	Poland	
254	Tjörven De Brul	10	12	0	570	25 Mar 1998	Norway	18 Aug 1999	Finland	
254	Albert De Hert	10	13	3	840	2 Jan 1949	Spain	1 Nov 1950	France	
254	Léon Dolmans	10	16	2	844	7 Nov 1971	Luxembourg	31 Oct 1973	Norway	
254	Laurent Grimmonprez	10	10	1	900	23 Mar 1924	Netherlands	27 May 1934	Germany	
254	Robert Hustin	10	10	0	930	7 May 1905	France	9 May 1909	France	
254	Emile Lejeune	10	14	0	900	30 Oct 1960	Hungary	23 May 1962	Poland	
254	Georges Michel	10	11	3	900	9 Mar 1919	France	21 May 1922	Italy	
254	Charles Simons	10	11	0	900	3 May 1931	Netherlands	12 Jun 1932	Sweden	
254	Roland Storme	10	15	0	900	26 May 1958	Switzerland	1 Apr 1962	Netherlands	
254	Jean Van Cant	10	10	7	900	20 Feb 1912	Switzerland	26 Apr 1914	Netherlands	
254	André Vanderstappen	10	23	0	900	28 Apr 1957	Netherlands	14 Jun 1959	Austria	
266	Henri Bierna ^{§1}	9	9	2	810	2 Jan 1927	Czechoslovakia	5 Jun 1928	Netherlands	
266	Koen Daerden	9	14	3	547	21 Aug 2002	Poland	7 Feb 2007	Czech Republic	
266	**Igor De Camargo**	9	15	0	521	11 Feb 2009	Slovenia	25 May 2012	Montenegro	
266	Gaëtan Englebert	9	21	0	500	28 Feb 2001	San Marino	6 Sep 2006	Armenia	
266	Jean Fievez	9	10	4	810	3 May 1936	Netherlands	27 May 1939	Poland	
266	**Jean-François Gillet**	9	59	0	760	5 Sep 2009	Spain	6 Feb 2013	Slovakia	
266	Emile Hanse ^{§2}	9	9	0	810	17 Feb 1920	England	20 Jun 1926	France	
266	Paul Henry	9	10	0	810	29 Mar 1936	Netherlands	21 Apr 1940	Netherlands	
266	Augustin Janssens	9	10	1	810	25 Dec 1952	France	11 Mar 1956	Switzerland	
266	Jules Lavigne ^{§2}	9	9	0	810	1 Apr 1928	Netherlands	12 Jun 1932	Sweden	
266	Maarten Martens	9	12	0	579	7 Feb 2007	Czech Republic	3 Mar 2010	Croatia	
266	Désiré Paternoster	9	9	2	840	26 Oct 1908	Sweden	23 Apr 1911	Germany	
266	Antoine Puttaert	9	10	0	810	24 Dec 1944	France	4 May 1947	Netherlands	
266	André Saeys	9	10	1	810	9 Apr 1933	Netherlands	11 Mar 1934	Netherlands	
266	François Sermon	9	10	2	810	15 Dec 1945	France	17 Jun 1951	Portugal	
266	Alphonse Six	9	9	8	840	13 Mar 1910	Netherlands	20 Feb 1912	Switzerland	
266	Stefaan Tanghe	9	14	2	501	9 Feb 1999	Czech Republic	27 Mar 2002	Greece	
266	Edgard Van Boxtaele	9	9	0	810	29 Mar 1908	Netherlands	19 Mar 1911	Netherlands	
266	Louis Van Hege ^{§3}	9	9	3	764	9 Mar 1919	France	21 May 1922	Italy	
266	Bob Van Kerkhoven	9	37	1	800	14 Oct 1951	Austria	23 Dec 1956	West Germany	
286	**Logan Bailly**	8	17	0	720	10 Oct 2009	Turkey	12 Oct 2010	Austria	
286	Fernand Boone	8	20	0	720	9 Oct 1968	Netherlands	16 Apr 1967	Finland	
286	Prosper Braeckman	8	8	0	720	17 Apr 1909	England	4 May 1913	Switzerland	
286	Adolf De Buck	8	16	0	720	23 Feb 1946	Luxembourg	6 Jun 1948	France	
286	Ronald Gaspercic	8	15	0	569	18 Nov 1998	Luxembourg	25 Apr 2001	Czech Republic	
286	Joseph Givard	8	10	1	720	10 Jun 1951	Spain	27 Oct 1957	France	
286	Fernand Goyvaerts	8	8	1	720	1 Mar 1959	France	20 May 1961	Switzerland	
286	Manu Karagiannis	8	8	0	605	29 Mar 1995	Spain	25 Feb 1998	United States	
286	**Jordan Lukaku**	8	19	0	426	10 Oct 2015	Andorra	14 Nov 2017	Japan	
286	Jacky Munaron	8	44	0	720	1 Jul 1982	Soviet Union	14 Oct 1986	Luxembourg	
286	Roger Piérard	8	8	0	750	22 Apr 1906	France	21 Mar 1909	Netherlands	
286	Frédéric Pierre	8	10	0	313	24 Apr 1996	Russia	28 Apr 1999	Romania	
286	Tom Soetaers	8	14	1	86	12 Oct 2002	Andorra	9 Feb 2005	Egypt	
286	Georges Van Calenberg	8	8	0	720	29 Jan 1939	Germany	21 Apr 1940	Netherlands	
286	August Van Steelant	8	12	3	720	14 Mar 1948	Netherlands	14 Oct 1951	Austria	
286	Hippolyte Van den Bosch	8	15	2	677	22 Nov 1953	Switzerland	31 Mar 1957	Spain	
286	Philippe Vande Walle	8	30	0	649	24 Apr 1996	Russia	4 Sep 1999	Netherlands	
286	Charles Vanden Wouwer	8	8	2	720	30 Jan 1938	France	21 Apr 1940	Netherlands	
286	Josip Weber	8	8	6	651	3 Jun 1994	Zambia	21 Oct 1994	Denmark	
307	Toni Brogno	7	11	0	114	18 Nov 1998	Luxembourg	26 Apr 2000	Norway	
307	Filip Daems	7	12	0	361	28 Apr 1999	Germany	29 May 2009	Chile	
307	François De Vries	7	7	1	630	27 May 1934	Germany	13 Mar 1938	Luxembourg	
307	Guy Delhasse	7	33	0	542	8 Mar 1961	West Germany	26 Sep 1965	Bulgaria	
307	Pierre-Joseph Destrebecq	7	7	5	660	1 May 1904	France	13 May 1906	Netherlands	
307	Gérard Devos ^{§2}	7	7	1	630	11 Apr 1926	France	19 May 1928	England	
307	Fernand Goossens	7	7	2	660	26 Oct 1908	Sweden	10 Apr 1910	Netherlands	
307	Albert Heremans	7	7	0	584	6 Dec 1931	Switzerland	27 May 1934	Germany	
307	Frédéric Herpoel	7	39	0	355	4 Sep 1999	Netherlands	31 Mar 2004	Germany	
307	Chris Janssens	7	9	0	295	18 Nov 1998	Luxembourg	5 June 1999	South Korea	
307	Jean Janssens	7	8	1	486	5 Nov 1969	Mexico	12 Sep 1979	Norway	
307	Robert Lamoot	7	8	2	630	22 Oct 1933	Germany	27 May 1939	Poland	
307	**Marvin Ogunjimi**	7	9	5	394	8 Oct 2010	Kazakhstan	11 Oct 2011	Germany	
307	Cisse Severeyns	7	8	1	235	19 Jan 1988	Israel	31 Mar 1993	Wales	
307	Jules Suetens	7	7	1	630	26 Apr 1908	Netherlands	26 Apr 1914	Netherlands	
307	Bernd Thijs	7	16	0	148	14 May 2002	Algeria	11 Aug 2010	Finland	
307	Maurice Tobias	7	7	0	630	1 May 1904	France	26 Apr 1908	Netherlands	
307	Roger Van Gool	7	7	2	561	15 Nov 1975	France	20 Sep 1978	Norway	
307	André Van Herpe	7	10	1	630	14 Oct 1956	Netherlands	26 Oct 1958	Turkey	
307	Fritz Vandenboer	7	16	2	630	1 Mar 1959	France	25 May 1966	Republic of Ireland	
307	Marcel Vercammen	7	9	0	630	24 Dec 1944	France	4 May 1947	Netherlands	
307	Hans Vanaken	7	24	0	448	7 Sep 2018	Scotland	11 Nov 2020	Switzerland	
307	Willy Wellens	7	11	0	524	22 May 1976	Netherlands	25 Mar 1981	Republic of Ireland	
330	Charles Bauwens	6	6	0	540	26 Mar 1910	England	10 Mar 1912	Netherlands	
330	Ferdinand Boogaerts	6	10	0	540	10 Jun 1951	Spain	26 Nov 1952	England	
330	Yari Verschaeren	6	12	1	121	9 Sep 2019	Scotland	11 Oct 2020	England	
330	Jean Bouttiau	6	6	1	540	2 Apr 1911	Netherlands	8 Apr 1912	England	
330	Mathieu Bragard ^{§1}	6	6	5	540	26 Apr 1914	Netherlands	9 Oct 1921	Spain	
330	Paul Courant	6	9	1	451	5 Sep 1976	Iceland	20 Sep 1978	Norway	
330	René Devos	6	6	0	540	15 Dec 1945	France	30 May 1946	Netherlands	
330	Olivier Doll	6	12	0	245	30 Apr 1997	Turkey	17 Aug 2005	Greece	
330	Willy Geurts	6	6	1	283	20 Mar 1978	Austria	24 Mar 1982	Romania	
330	René Gillard	6	6	0	540	13 Mar 1949	Netherlands	23 Nov 1949	Wales	
330	Henri Govard	6	11	4	540	28 Apr 1948	Scotland	6 Nov 1949	Netherlands	
330	**Faris Haroun**	6	7	0	402	6 Jun 2007	Finland	31 May 2009	Japan	
330	Marc Millecamps	6	17	0	254	27 Feb 1980	Luxembourg	1 Jul 1982	Soviet Union	
330	José Moës	6	6	4	540	14 Oct 1951	Austria	11 Nov 1954	France	
330	Léon Ritzen	6	6	1	471	28 Feb 1960	France	19 Jun 1968	Finland	
330	Achille Schelstraete ^{§1}	6	6	1	540	4 Feb 1923	Spain	13 Jan 1924	France	
330	Albert Sulon	6	6	0	493	24 Mar 1965	Republic of Ireland	21 May 1967	Poland	
330	Gérard Sulon	6	12	0	540	21 Oct 1964	England	2 Jun 1965	Brazil	
330	Peter Van Houdt	6	10	0	224	27 Mar 1999	Bulgaria	16 Oct 2002	Estonia	
330	Frans Vermeyen	6	8	2	540	1 Dec 1963	Spain	9 May 1965	Israel	
330	Mike Verstraeten	6	10	0	442	11 Oct 1997	Wales	13 Jun 1998	Netherlands	
330	Maurice Vertongen	6	6	1	540	9 May 1907	Netherlands	19 Mar 1911	Netherlands	
330	Jozef Vliers	6	9	0	540	3 Apr 1955	Netherlands	24 Apr 1963	Brazil	
353	Joseph Augustus	5	5	0	404	5 May 1921	Italy	24 May 1925	Switzerland	
353	Jurgen Cavens	5	6	1	201	28 Apr 1999	Romania	7 Oct 2000	Latvia	
353	Frans Christiaens	5	5	0	397	28 Apr 1935	Germany	29 Mar 1936	Netherlands	
353	Jos Daerden	5	8	0	319	27 May 1982	Denmark	29 Feb 1984	West Germany	
353	Frank Dauwen	5	9	0	174	13 Feb 1991	Italy	2 Sep 1992	Czechoslovakia	
353	Maurice De Coster	5	5	0	450	2 Nov 1913	Switzerland	15 Mar 1914	Netherlands	
353	Walter De Greef	5	6	0	450	17 Apr 1984	Poland	19 Jun 1984	Denmark	
353	Mark De Man	5	11	0	228	24 Mar 2007	Portugal	20 Aug 2008	Germany	
353	Bart De Roover	5	6	0	425	11 Feb 1997	Northern Ireland	11 Oct 1997	Wales	
353	Wilfried Delbroek	5	6	0	357	3 Feb 1999	Cyprus	2 Jun 1999	Japan	
353	Michel Delire	5	8	1	375	27 Oct 1957	France	22 May 1960	Bulgaria	
353	Cornelius Elst	5	5	0	450	21 May 1922	Italy	1 Apr 1928	Netherlands	
353	Marcel Feye	5	5	0	480	27 Apr 1907	France	16 May 1910	Germany	
353	René Feye	5	5	4	480	22 Apr 1906	France	9 May 1907	Netherlands	
353	Jean Jadot	5	6	2	450	5 Jun 1955	Czechoslovakia	24 Apr 1960	Netherlands	
353	**Roland Lamah**	5	5	0	213	9 Sep 2009	Armenia	17 Nov 2009	Qatar	
353	Paul Lambrichts	5	6	0	370	29 Feb 1984	West Germany	16 Jun 1984	France	
353	Fernand Massay	5	6	0	450	13 May 1945	Luxembourg	2 Nov 1947	Switzerland	
353	Jan Nelissen	5	5	0	450	28 Apr 1957	Netherlands	17 Nov 1957	Netherlands	
353	Pascal Plovie	5	11	0	247	11 Nov 1987	Luxembourg	26 Feb 1992	Tunisia	
353	Charles Saeys	5	5	0	450	28 Feb 1960	France	2 Oct 1960	Netherlands	
353	André Stassart	5	7	0	360	28 Oct 1967	France	21 Nov 1971	Portugal	
353	Jean Straetmans	5	7	2	402	26 Nov 1952	England	11 Mar 1956	Switzerland	
353	Désiré Van Den Audenaerde	5	8	0	450	24 Dec 1944	France	18 Apr 1948	Netherlands	
353	Raymond Van Gestel	5	5	2	450	15 Apr 1951	Netherlands	8 Oct 1953	Sweden	
353	Jan Van Steen	5	7	1	450	25 Nov 1951	Netherlands	30 May 1954	France	
353	Charles Vanderstappen	5	5	0	510	1 May 1904	France	14 Apr 1907	Netherlands	
353	Jacques Vandevelde	5	5	1	450	9 Oct 1921	Spain	29 Apr 1923	Netherlands	
353	André Vandeweyer	5	6	0	450	26 Nov 1933	Denmark	27 May 1934	Germany	
353	Fernand Wertz	5	6	1	450	2 Nov 1913	Switzerland	9 Oct 1921	Spain	
353	Alphonse Wright	5	5	0	450	22 Apr 1906	France	9 May 1907	Netherlands	
353	Jérémy Doku	5	7	1	?	2 Nov 1913	Switzerland	14 Oct 2020	Iceland	
353	Victor Wégria	5	7	2	402	8 Dec 1957	Turkey	15 Mar 1961	France	
