= Belgium national football team records and statistics =

This article lists various team and individual football records in relation to the Belgium national team (The Red Devils). (Note: These records and statistics include caps and goals against Romania on 14 November 2012, against Luxembourg on 26 May 2014 and against Czech Republic on 5 June 2017, which were counted by RBFA, but are not officially recognised by FIFA – the former two due to an excessive number of substitutions according to the Laws of the Game, the latter because the Belgian and Czech football federations were too late in requesting an official match. When applicable, footnotes clarify the discrepancy.) The page currently shows the records as of 15 November 2026.

== Team records ==
=== Wins ===
Largest win

- 10–1 vs San Marino on 28 February 2001
- 9–0 vs Zambia on 4 June 1994
- 9–0 vs Gibraltar on 31 August 2017
- 9–0 vs San Marino on 10 October 2019

Largest away win

- 6–0 vs Luxembourg on 14 October 1986
- 6–0 vs Gibraltar on 10 October 2016
- 6–0 vs Liechtenstein on 4 September 2025

Largest win at the World Cup finals
5–1 vs New Zealand on 26 June 2026, 2026 World Cup
Largest win at the European Championship finals
4–0 vs Hungary on 26 June 2016, Euro 2016
Largest win at the Olympic Games finals
3–0 vs Netherlands on 31 August 1920, 1920 Summer Olympics
Largest goal deficit overcome in a single game (to either a win or a draw)
3 goals, vs Denmark on 6 May 1932 (4–3 victory after being 0–3 down)

=== Draws ===
It didn't make sense at all, this match.

— Dutch international Frank de Boer, after the high Netherlands-Belgium scoring draw (5–5) in 1999

Highest scoring draw
5–5 vs Netherlands on 4 September 1999
Highest scoring draw at the World Cup finals
4–4 (a.e.t.) vs England on 17 June 1954, 1954 World Cup
Highest scoring draw at the European Championship finals
1–1 vs England on 12 June 1980, Euro 1980
Highest scoring draw at the Olympic Games finals
None

=== Defeats ===
The English probably found a dozen enough!

— Mockery Dutch newspaper comment after Belgium's unofficial 12–0 loss to Corinthian, their biggest ever defeat

Largest defeat
2–11 vs England Amateurs on 17 April 1909
Including unofficial games: 0–12 vs Corinthian on 6 January 1906
Largest defeat at home
1–9 vs England on 11 May 1927
Largest defeat at the World Cup finals

- 0–3 vs United States on 13 July 1930, 1930 World Cup
- 2–5 vs (Nazi Germany) Germany on 27 May 1934, 1934 World Cup
- 1–4 vs Italy on 20 June 1954, 1954 World Cup
- 1–4 vs Soviet Union on 6 June 1970, 1970 World Cup
- 0–3 vs Poland on 28 June 1982, 1982 World Cup

Largest defeat at the European Championship finals
0–5 vs France on 16 June 1984, Euro 1984

Belgium-Sweden 1–8, Sweden cracks Belgium.

— Dutch newspaper heading after Belgium suffered its largest defeat at a major tournament, at the 1924 Summer Olympics

Largest defeat at the Olympic Games finals
1–8 vs Sweden on 29 May 1924, 1924 Summer Olympics
Largest lead given away
2 goals, on several occasions

=== Goals ===
==== Scored ====
Most goals scored in a single game
10 vs San Marino on 28 February 2001
Most goals scored in an away game
7 vs Netherlands on 25 November 1951
Most goals scored during the first half
7 vs Iceland on 5 June 1957
Most goals scored during the second half
7 vs San Marino on 28 February 2001
Most goals scored during extra time

- 2 vs Soviet Union on 15 June 1986
- 2 vs United States on 1 July 2014

Most goals scored in a single game during the World Cup finals

- 5 vs Tunisia on 23 June 2018, 2018 World Cup
- 5 vs New Zealand on 26 June 2026, 2026 World Cup

Most goals scored in a single game during the European Championship finals
4 vs Hungary on 26 June 2016, Euro 2016

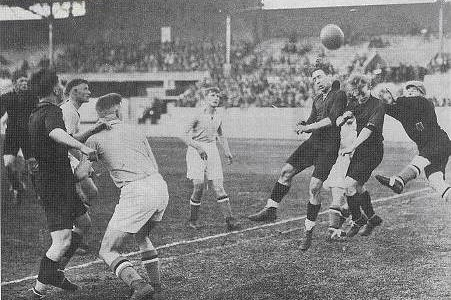
Match phase of Belgium's most productive Olympic game, against Luxembourg in 1928 (5–3)

Most goals scored in a single game during the Olympic Games finals
5 vs Luxembourg on 27 May 1928, 1928 Summer Olympics
Most different players scoring during a single game
7 (+ 1 own goal) (Romelu Lukaku (2), Nacer Chadli, Toby Alderweireld, Youri Tielemans, Christian Benteke, Yari Verschaeren and Timothy Castagne) (+ own goal by Cristian Brolli), vs San Marino on 10 October 2019

==== Conceded ====
Most goals conceded in a single game
11 vs England Amateurs on 17 April 1909
Including unofficial games: 12 vs Corinthian on 6 January 1906
Most goals conceded during a home game
9 vs England on 11 May 1927
Most goals conceded during the first half
8 vs England Amateurs on 17 April 1909
Most goals conceded during the second half

- 6 vs England Amateurs on 24 February 1914
- 6 vs (Nazi Germany) Germany on 22 October 1933
- 6 vs Netherlands on 27 February 1938
- 6 vs Austria on 14 October 1951
- 6 vs Netherlands on 13 April 1958

Most goals conceded during extra time
3 vs Netherlands on 30 April 1905
Most goals conceded in a single game during the World Cup finals
5 vs (Nazi Germany) Germany on 27 May 1934, 1934 World Cup
Most goals conceded in a single game during the European Championship Finals
5 vs France on 16 June 1984, Euro 1984
Most goals conceded in a single game during the Olympic Games finals
8 vs Sweden on 29 May 1924, 1924 Summer Olympics

==== Scored and conceded ====
Highest total number of goals in a single game

- 13: 2–11 defeat against England Amateurs on 17 April 1909

Thirteen times a hole in the air...

— Dutch newspaper heading after the goal-rich 1951 Netherlands-Belgium encounter; both supporter sides together had 13 reasons to jump in the air
- 13: 7–6 victory against Netherlands on 25 November 1951

=== Streaks ===
Longest unbeaten run
23 games, from 2016 to 2018 (Note: This does not include the FIFA unrecognized friendly against the Czech Republic on 5 June 2017)
Longest run without victory
13, from 1933 to 1935
Most consecutive wins
12, from 2019 to 2020
Most consecutive draws
4, from 1948 to 1949, and in 1998
Most consecutive losses
7, from 1927 to 1928
Most consecutive games with at least one goal scored
49, from 2018 to 2022
Most consecutive games without a goal scored
5, in 1999
Most consecutive games without a goal conceded
7, in 2019
Most consecutive games with at least one goal conceded
38, from 1928 to 1933

=== World rankings ===
==== FIFA ====
Source: FIFA.com

Belgium go top, Chile and Austria soar

— FIFA News announcing Belgium's highest ever FIFA World Ranking in November 2015

Highest FIFA ranking
1st (November 2015 – March 2016, September 2018 – March 2022)
Lowest FIFA ranking
71st (June 2007)
Best Mover
+25 (April 2011)
Worst Mover
−14 (September 2010)

==== Elo ====
Source: Eloratings.net

Highest Elo rating
2157 (following 1–0 vs Portugal on 27 June 2021)
Lowest Elo rating
1504 (following 0–8 vs Netherlands on 29 March 1936)
Highest Elo ranking
1st (16 November 2019 – 11 October 2020, 27 June 2021, 2 September 2021 – 8 September 2021)
Lowest Elo ranking
74th (September 2009)

== Achievements ==
=== Major titles ===
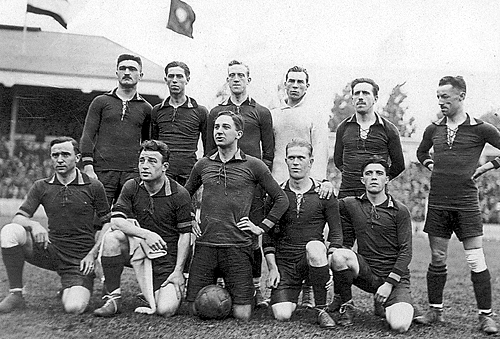
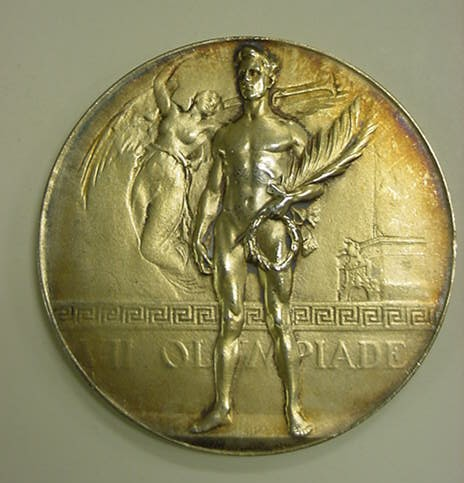
Belgium's 1920 Olympic champions, and one of the 154 gold medals awarded at these Games of the VII Olympiad

Olympic football tournament
Gold Medal (1): 1920

=== Friendly trophies ===
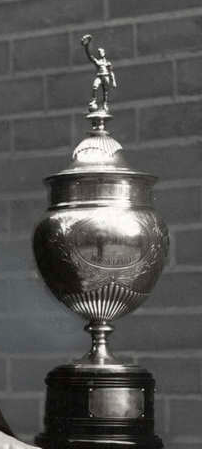
The Coupe Vanden Abeele

- Évence Coppée Trophy

Shared (1): 1904

- Challenge Frédéric Vanden Abeele

Winners (3): 1906, 1922, 1925
Shared (3): 1913, 1921, 1924

- Rotterdamsch Nieuwsblad-beker

Winners (5): 1906, 1907, 1913, 1922, 1926
Shared (5): 1923, 1924, 1928 (2x), 1930

- Kirin Cup

Shared (1): 1999

=== Awards ===
- FIFA Team of the Year

Winners (5): 2015, 2018, 2019, 2020, 2021

- FIFA Fair Play Trophy

Winners (1): 2002

- Belgian National Sports Merit Award

Winners (1): 1980

- Belgian Sportsteam of the Year

Winners (2): 2013, 2014

=== Other achievements ===
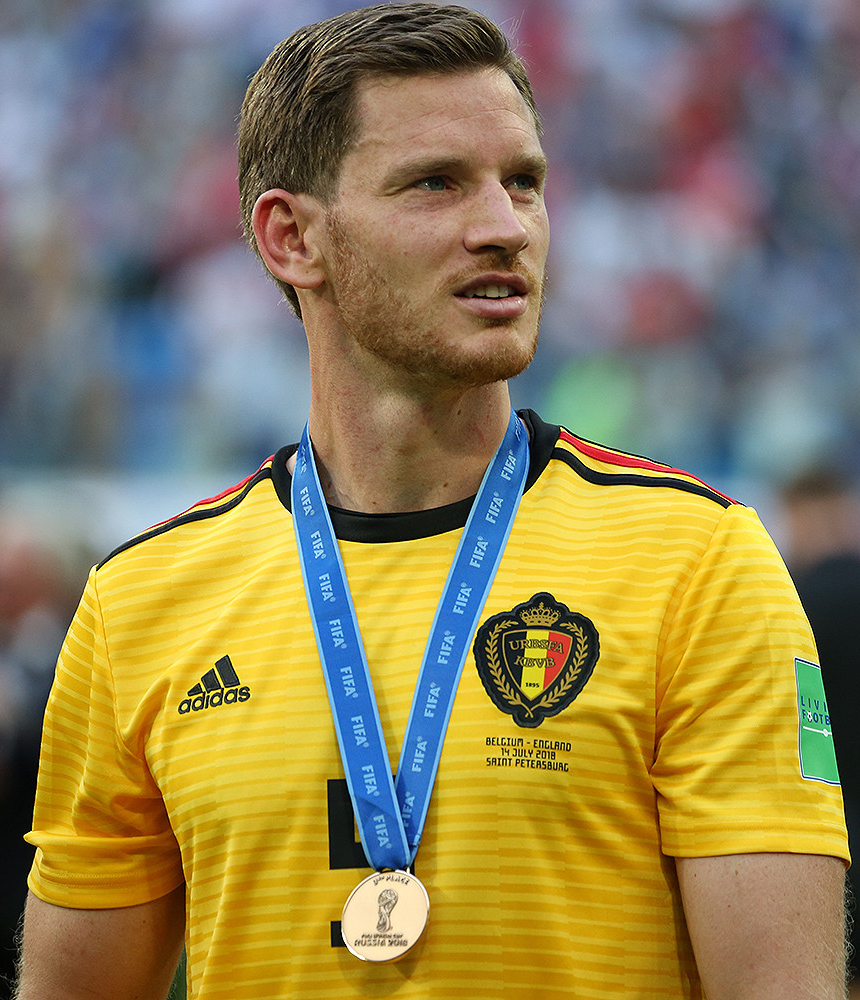
In 2018, the Belgian players won bronze at the World Cup (pictured: Jan Vertonghen).

- FIFA World Cup

Third place (1): 2018
Fourth place (1): 1986

- UEFA European Championship

Runners-up (1): 1980
Third place (1): 1972

- UEFA Nations League

Fourth place (1): 2021

Individual

- For individual recognitions at major tournaments, see FIFA World Cup awards and UEFA European Championship awards.
- All players with at least 35 caps are awarded a Medal of Recognition by the Royal Belgian Football Association; also players whose careers are ended by an injury after twenty games receive this award.

== FIFA rankings history ==
Belgium's history in the FIFA World Rankings. The table shows the position that Belgium held in December of each year (and the current position as of 2025), as well as the highest and lowest positions annually.

Year	Position	Highest	Lowest
1992	17	17	17
1993	25	18	25
1994	24	19	34
1995	24	18	29
1996	42	25	43
1997	41	31	48
1998	35	28	41
1999	33	21	33
2000	27	23	33
2001	20	20	33
2002	17	17	23
2003	16	16	18
2004	45	16	45
2005	55	41	55
2006	53	47	57
2007	49	49	71
2008	54	42	55
2009	66	49	68
2010	57	48	68
2011	41	34	62
2012	21	20	54
2013	11	5	20
2014	4	4	12
2015	1	1	4
2016	5	1	5
2017	5	5	10
2018	1	1	5
2019	1	1	1
2020	1	1	1
2021	1	1	1
2022	4	1	4
2023	4	4	5
2024	8	3	8
2025	8	8	8

== Appearances ==
=== General ===
Most appearances
Jan Vertonghen (2007–2024), 157 caps (Note: This includes three caps in FIFA unrecognized friendlies)

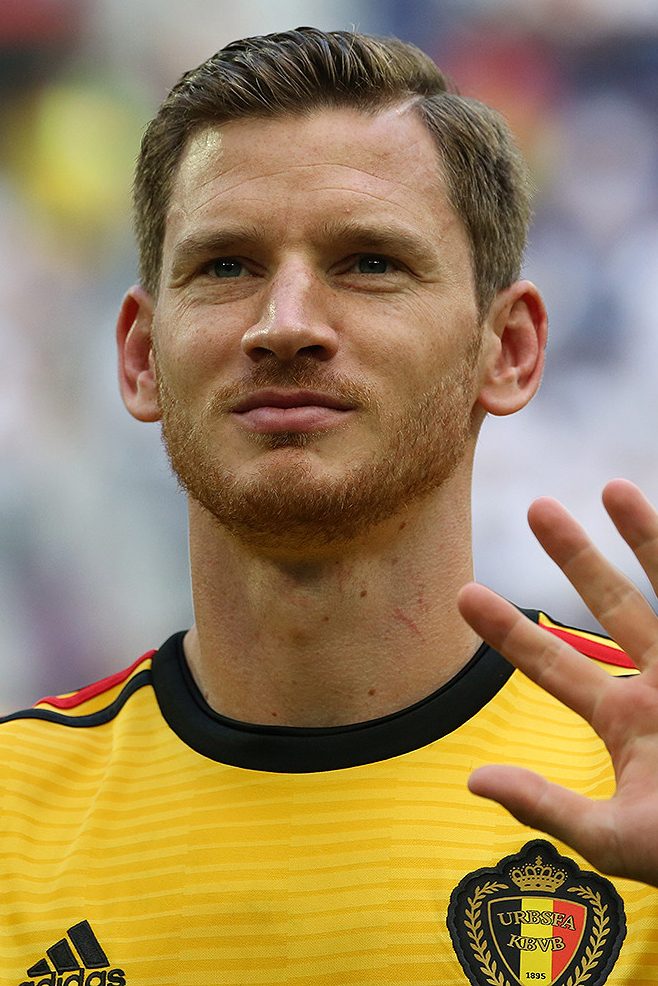
Jan Vertonghen holds the record for most Belgium international appearances.

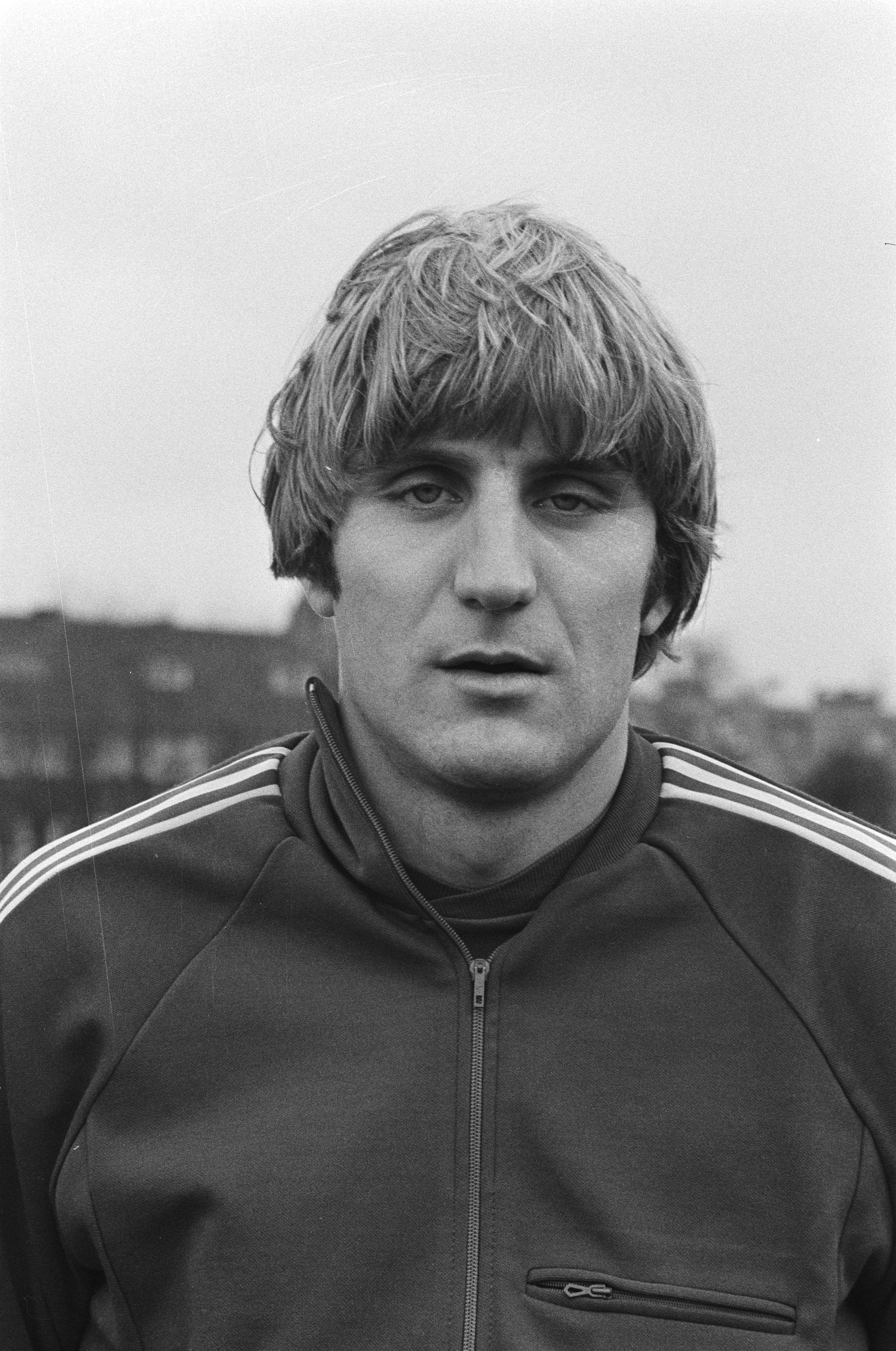
Jan Ceulemans, nicknamed Caje and Strong Jan, was formerly Belgium's record captain.

The following are the top ten most capped players; players with an equal number of caps are ranked in chronological order of reaching the milestone:

Rank	Player	Belgium career	Caps	Goals	Position
1	Jan Vertonghen	2007–2024	157	10	DF
2	Axel Witsel	2008–2026	140 (Note: This includes two caps in FIFA unrecognized friendlies)	12	MF
3	Romelu Lukaku	2010–2026	135	94 (Note: This includes three goals in FIFA unrecognized friendlies)	FW
4	Kevin De Bruyne	2010–	129	41	MF
5	Toby Alderweireld	2009–2022	127	5	DF
6	Eden Hazard	2008–2022	126 (Note: This includes one cap in a FIFA unrecognized friendly)	33	MF/FW
7	Thibaut Courtois	2011–	115	0	GK
8	Dries Mertens	2011–2022	109	21	FW
9	Jan Ceulemans	1977–1991	96	23	MF/FW
10	Youri Tielemans	2016–	95	15	MF

As of 15 November 2026. The records are collected based on data from FIFA and RSSSF.
Highlighted names denote a player still playing or available for selection.

Most consecutive appearances
Louis Carré, 50 games, from 22 May 1949 (vs Wales) until 11 March 1956 (vs Switzerland)
Most appearances as a substitute
Dries Mertens, 40 caps
Most times substituted off
Romelu Lukaku, 61 caps
Most games started on the bench
Simon Mignolet, 88 games (Note: This includes two selections for FIFA unrecognized friendlies)
Most selections (playing + non-playing)
Jan Vertonghen, 168 selections (Note: This includes three selections for FIFA unrecognized friendlies)
Most selections as an unused substitute
Simon Mignolet, 94 selections
Most selections as an unused substitute without ever earning a cap
Jacques Duquesne, 16 selections
Most selections needed to earn first cap
Koen Casteels, 37 selections (Note: This includes one selection in a FIFA unrecognized friendly)
Lowest caps to selections ratio (> 0)
Jean Valet, 1/19
Most selections without ever being an unused substitute
Wesley Sonck, 55 selections
Most appearances as a substitute without ever starting a game
Tom Soetaers, 8 caps
Most appearances while never playing an entire game
Adnan Januzaj, 15 caps & Tom Soetaers, 8 caps
Most appearances in the starting eleven
Jan Vertonghen, 149 caps
Most caps earned while not playing the entire game
Dries Mertens, 89 caps
Most caps earned while only playing entire games
Bernard Voorhoof, 61 caps
Most caps earned while playing an entire game
Jan Vertonghen, 131 caps
Most caps without ever being substituted off
Georges Heylens, 67 caps
Most caps without ever appearing as a substitute
Thibaut Courtois, 115 caps
Most caps needed to first play an entire game
Romelu Lukaku, 24 caps
Most caps needed to first appear in the starting eleven
Mbo Mpenza, 9 caps

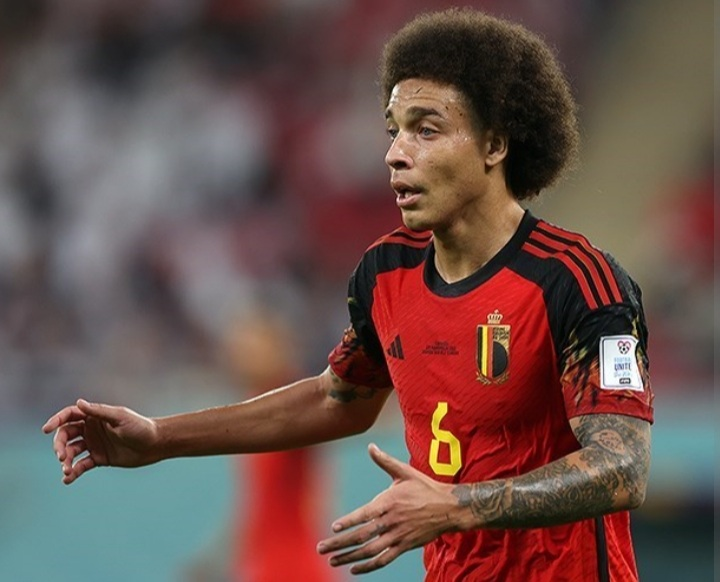
Axel Witsel is the player with the longest career span.

First player to reach a century of caps
Jan Vertonghen, vs Portugal on 2 June 2018
Shortest time needed to reach a century of caps
Eden Hazard, 10 years, 4 months and 5 days between his debut (vs Luxembourg on 19 November 2008) and his 100th cap (vs Cyprus on 24 March 2019)
Longest Belgian career
Axel Witsel, 6,680 days or 18 years, 3 months and 14 days between first (vs Morocco on 26 March 2008) and last cap (vs Spain on 10 July 2026)
Shortest Belgian career
Joris Van Hout, 2 minutes (on 16 October 2002 vs Estonia)
Most consecutive calendar years of appearances
Jan Vertonghen (2007–2024), 18 years
Longest wait between appearances
Hector Goetinck, 3,476 days or 9 years, 6 months and 27 days, between his 16th (vs Netherlands on 26 April 1914) and his 17th and final cap (vs England on 1 November 1923)
Appearances in three separate decades

- Georges Hebdin; 3 in the 1900s, 6 in the 1910s and 3 in 1920
- Hector Goetinck; 6 in the 1900s, 10 in the 1910s and 1 in 1923
- Bernard Voorhoof; 3 in 1928, 56 in the 1930s and 2 in 1940
- Vic Mees; 6 in 1949, 57 in the 1950s and 5 in 1960
- Wilfried Van Moer; 14 in the 1960s, 25 in the 1970s and 18 in the 1980s
- Jan Ceulemans; 10 in the 1970s, 75 in the 1980s and 11 in the 1990s
- Michel Preud'homme; 1 in 1979, 17 in the 1980s and 41 in the 1990s
- Eric Gerets; 19 in the 1970s, 57 in the 1980s and 10 in the 1990s
- Erwin Vandenbergh; 1 in 1979, 43 in the 1980s and 4 in the 1990s
- Filip De Wilde; 1 in 1989, 26 in the 1990s and 6 in 2000
- Danny Boffin; 2 in 1989, 39 in the 1990s and 14 in the 2000s
- Luc Nilis; 9 in the 1980s, 42 in the 1990s and 5 in 2000
- Jan Vertonghen; 20 in the 2000s, 98 in the 2010s and 39 in the 2020s
- Axel Witsel; 10 in the 2000s, 95 in the 2010s and 35 in the 2020s
- Toby Alderweireld; 4 in the 2000s, 94 in the 2010s and 29 in the 2020s
- Thomas Vermaelen; 27 in the 2000s, 51 in the 2010s and 7 in the 2020s
- Eden Hazard; 10 in the 2000s, 96 in the 2010s and 20 in the 2020s

Smallest number of caps needed to appear in three separate decades
Georges Hebdin, 10 caps (total number of caps obtained: 12)
First player to debut as a substitute
Louis Van Hege, vs France on 9 March 1919
Most times completed a game of 120 minutes
Jan Ceulemans & Stéphane Demol, 4 games, both at the 1986 and 1990 World Cups
First appearance by a player who was playing abroad
Raymond Braine (Sparta Prague, Czechoslovakia), vs France on 14 April 1935
First appearance by a player who had never played for the senior team of a Belgian club
Thomas Buffel, vs Andorra on 12 October 2002
First appearance by a player born outside Belgium
Eric Thornton (born in England), vs Netherlands on 30 April 1905
First appearance by a player born outside of Europe
Luís Oliveira (born in Brazil), vs Tunisia on 26 February 1992
Last appearance by a player from a Belgian club outside the top division
Jan Verheyen (Union Saint-Gilloise), Belgian Third Division, vs Netherlands on 25 April 1976
Last appearance by a player from outside the top division of any country
Lucas Stassin (Saint-Étienne), (France) Ligue 2, vs Mexico on 31 March 2026
Players who have never played for the first team of a Belgian club
Thomas Vermaelen, Eden Hazard, Divock Origi, Adnan Januzaj, Yannick Carrasco, Jason Denayer, Koen Casteels, Orel Mangala, Amadou Onana, Johan Bakayoko, Roméo Lavia, Koni De Winter, Diego Moreira and Mika Godts
Most appearances without ever playing for the first team of a Belgian club
Eden Hazard, 126 caps
Most appearances while active with a non-Belgian club
Jan Vertonghen (Ajax, Tottenham Hotspur & Benfica), 139 caps
Players appearing against the country of their birth

- Stanley Vanden Eynde vs Netherlands on 3 May 1931, 9 April 1933, 7 May 1933, 2 May 1937, and 27 February 1938
- Erwin Vandendaele vs France on 15 November 1970, 12 October 1974 and 15 November 1975
- Branko Strupar vs Croatia on 2 September 2000
- Amadou Onana vs Senegal on 1 July 2026

Highest number of players born outside Belgium simultaneously on the field
3 (Luís Oliveira, Gordan Vidović & Mbo Mpenza) vs France on 27 May 1998
Players also appearing for another senior national team

- Josip Weber, played three friendlies for Croatia in 1992, but switched to the Belgium national team in 1994
- Mehdi Carcela played two friendlies for Belgium in 2009–2010, before opting for Morocco in 2011
- Nacer Chadli, played one friendly for Morocco in 2010, before opting for Belgium in 2011
- Ilombe Mboyo, played one friendly for DR Congo in 2011, before opting for Belgium in 2012
- Denis Odoi played one friendly for Belgium in 2012, before opting for Ghana in 2022
- Dodi Lukébakio, played one friendly for DR Congo in 2016, before opting for Belgium in 2020
- Joris Kayembe played two friendlies for Belgium in 2020, before opting for DR Congo in 2023
- Hannes Delcroix played one friendly for Belgium in 2020, before opting for Haiti in 2025

Players capped while active outside of Europe

- Émile Mpenza: Al-Rayyan (Qatar), 3 caps
- Laurent Ciman: Montreal Impact (Canada), 10 caps & Los Angeles FC (United States), 1 cap
- Axel Witsel: Tianjin Quanjian (China), 16 caps
- Yannick Carrasco: Dalian Yifang (China), 20 caps & Al-Shabab (Saudi Arabia), 12 caps
- Thomas Vermaelen: Vissel Kobe (Japan), 11 caps
- Toby Alderweireld: Al-Duhail (Qatar), 8 caps
- Koen Casteels: Al-Qadsiah (Saudi Arabia), 6 caps
- Hugo Cuypers: Monterrey (Mexico), 1 cap

=== Age-related ===
Youngest player
Fernand Nisot, aged 16 years and 19 days, on 30 April 1911 vs Netherlands

The following are all the players who debuted for the national football team of Belgium before the age of 18, their team at that time and their usual position:

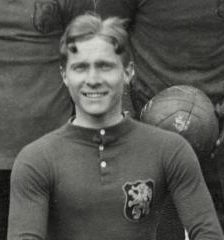
Fernand Nisot was Belgium's youngest player and the only who scored before the age of 17.

Rank	Player (club)	Age	Position
1	Fernand Nisot (Léopold Club)	16 years, 19 days	FW
2	Anthony Vanden Borre (Anderlecht)	16 years, 187 days	DF/MF
3	Romelu Lukaku (Anderlecht)	16 years, 294 days	FW
4	Paul Van Himst (Anderlecht)	17 years, 17 days	FW
5	Jorthy Mokio (Ajax)	17 years, 20 days	MF
6	Jean Capelle (Standard Liège)	17 years, 154 days	FW
7	Joseph Musch (Union Saint-Gilloise)	17 years, 200 days	DF
8	Nathan De Cat (Anderlecht)	17 years, 252 days	MF
9	Zakaria Bakkali (PSV Eindhoven)	17 years, 262 days	MF
10	Vincent Kompany (Anderlecht)	17 years, 314 days	DF
11	Eden Hazard (Lille)	17 years, 317 days	MF/FW
12	Raymond Braine (Beerschot)	17 years, 321 days	FW
13	Bernard Voorhoof (Lierse)	17 years, 341 days	FW

Oldest player
Timmy Simons, aged 39 years, 11 months and 2 days, vs Estonia on 13 November 2016

The following are the top ten oldest players for the national football team of Belgium, their team at that time and their usual position:

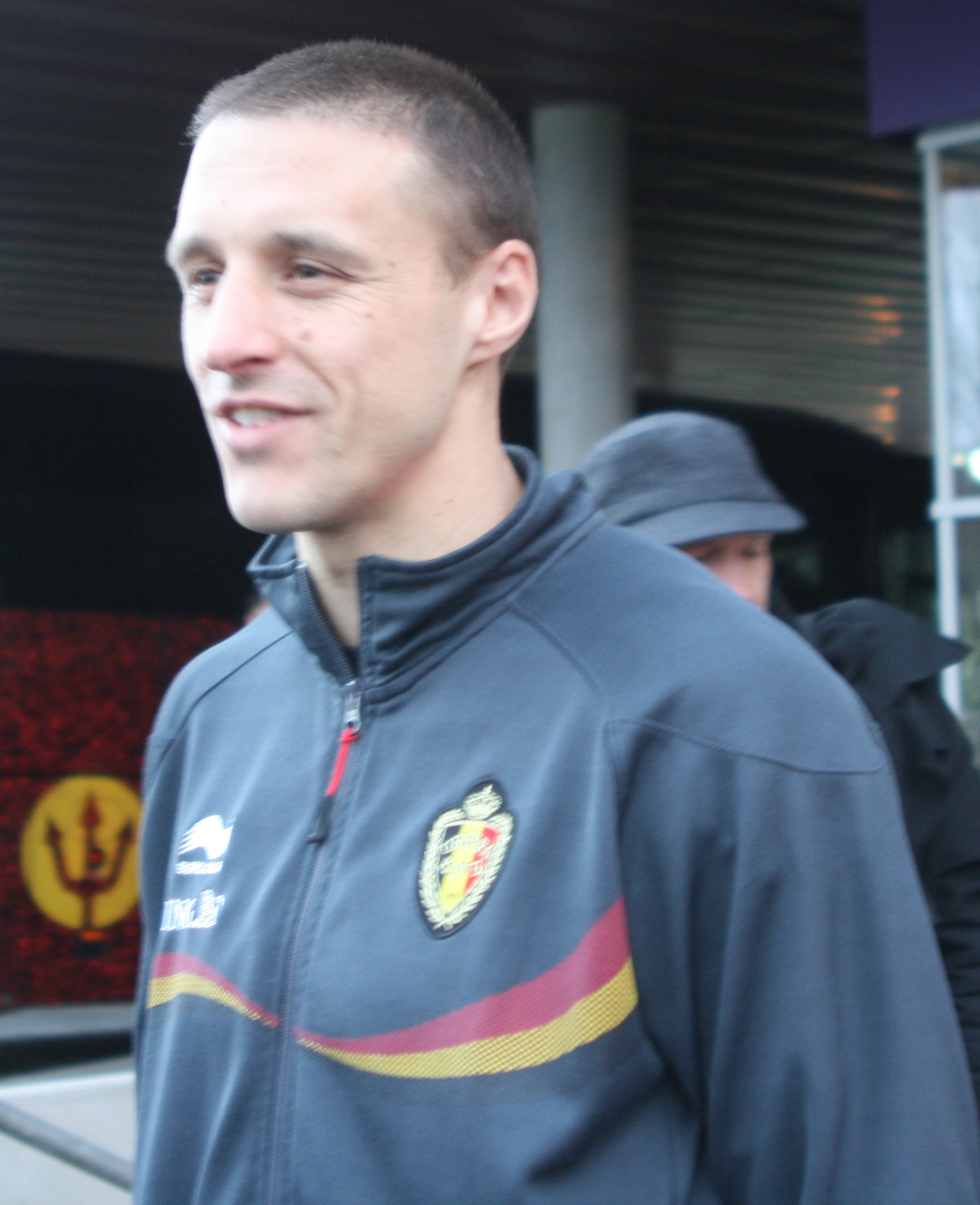
Timmy Simons still made an international appearance at age 39.

Rank	Player (club)	Age	Position
1	Timmy Simons (Club Brugge)	39 years, 338 days	DF/MF
2	Jean De Bie (Racing Brussels)	38 years, 30 days	GK
3	Philippe Vande Walle (Club Brugge)	37 years, 256 days	GK
4	Hector Goetinck (Club Brugge)	37 years, 241 days	MF
5	Axel Witsel (Girona)	37 years, 179 days	MF
6	Wilfried Van Moer (Beveren)	37 years, 119 days	MF
7	Jan Vertonghen (Anderlecht)	37 years, 68 days	DF
8	Franky Van der Elst (Club Brugge)	37 years, 56 days	MF
9	Danny Boffin (Sint-Truiden)	36 years, 320 days	MF
10	Eric Gerets (PSV Eindhoven)	36 years, 313 days	DF

Highlighted names denote a player still playing or available for selection.

Youngest goalkeeper
Robert Hustin, aged 18 years, 6 months and 24 days, vs France on 9 May 1905
Youngest player to reach a century of caps
Eden Hazard, aged 28 years, 2 months and 17 days, vs Cyprus on 24 March 2019
Oldest debutant
Dany Verlinden, aged 34 years, 10 months and 7 days, vs Norway on 25 March 1998
Oldest outfield debutant
Jozef Van Looy, aged 34 years, 2 months and 16 days, vs England on 18 May 1950
Oldest player to feature at the World Cup finals
Axel Witsel, aged 37 years, 5 months and 28 days, 2026 World Cup, vs Spain on 10 July 2026
Youngest player to feature at the World Cup finals
Divock Origi, aged 19 years, 1 month and 30 days, 2014 World Cup, vs Algeria on 17 June 2014
Oldest player to feature at the European Championship finals
Jan Vertonghen, aged 37 years, 2 months and 7 days, Euro 2024, vs France on 1 July 2024
Youngest player to feature at the European Championship finals
Enzo Scifo, aged 18 years, 3 months and 25 days, Euro 1984, vs Yugoslavia on 13 June 1984

=== On major tournaments ===
Most inclusions in a World Cup/European Championship finals squad
Kevin De Bruyne, Romelu Lukaku & Axel Witsel (2014 World Cup, Euro 2016, 2018 World Cup, Euro 2020, 2022 World Cup, Euro 2024 & 2026 World Cup), 7 tournaments
Most tournaments appeared in
Kevin De Bruyne & Romelu Lukaku (2014 World Cup, Euro 2016, 2018 World Cup, Euro 2020, 2022 World Cup, Euro 2024 & 2026 World Cup), 7 tournaments
Most tournaments appeared in consecutively
Kevin De Bruyne & Romelu Lukaku (2014 World Cup, Euro 2016, 2018 World Cup, Euro 2020, 2022 World Cup, Euro 2024 & 2026 World Cup), 7 tournaments
Most total appearances at the World Cup and European Championship finals
Romelu Lukaku, 32 caps
Most total non-playing selections for the World Cup and European Championship finals
Simon Mignolet, 24 selections
Most total non-playing selections for the World Cup and European Championship finals without ever playing in a tournament
Simon Mignolet, 24 selections
Most appearances without ever playing at the World Cup finals or the European Championship finals
Jef Jurion, 64 caps
Fewest appearances while still playing at both the World Cup finals and European Championship finals
Jacky Peeters & Branko Strupar, 17 caps
Most appearances without ever being in a World Cup or European Championship finals squad
Jef Jurion, 64 caps
Most inclusions in a World Cup/European Championship finals squad without playing in the tournament
Simon Mignolet (2014 World Cup, Euro 2016, 2018 World Cup, Euro 2020 & 2022 World Cup), 5 tournaments
Most inclusions in a World Cup/European Championship finals squad without ever playing in a tournament
Simon Mignolet (2014 World Cup, Euro 2016, 2018 World Cup, Euro 2020 & 2022 World Cup), 5 tournaments
Most appearances at the Olympic Games finals
Jean de Bie, 6 caps (3 in 1920, 1 in 1924 & 2 in 1928)
First player to make tournament appearances in three separate decades
None

==== FIFA World Cup ====
Most inclusions in the squad for the World Cup finals
Franky Van der Elst, Enzo Scifo (both in 1986, 1990, 1994 & 1998), Marc Wilmots (1990, 1994, 1998 & 2002), Thibaut Courtois, Kevin De Bruyne, Romelu Lukaku & Axel Witsel (each in 2014, 2018, 2022 & 2026), 4 World Cups
Most appearances in different World Cup finals
Franky Van der Elst, Enzo Scifo (both in 1986, 1990, 1994 & 1998), Thibaut Courtois, Kevin De Bruyne, Romelu Lukaku & Axel Witsel (each in 2014, 2018, 2022 & 2026), 4 World Cups
Most appearances at the World Cup finals
Thibaut Courtois, 21 caps
Most appearances without ever playing at the World Cup finals
Jef Jurion, 64 caps
Most non-playing selections for the World Cup finals
Simon Mignolet, 15 selections
Most selections for the World Cup finals without ever playing in the tournament
Simon Mignolet, 15 selections
Fewest appearances while still playing at the World Cup finals
Gérard Delbeke, 1 cap
Players to debut at the World Cup finals

- Henri De Deken, 1930 World Cup, vs Paraguay on 20 July 1930
- Gérard Delbeke, 1930 World Cup, vs Paraguay on 20 July 1930
- François De Vries, 1934 World Cup, vs (Nazi Germany) Germany on 27 May 1934
- Denis Houf, 1954 World Cup, vs England on 17 June 1954
- Pieter van den Bosch, 1954 World Cup, vs England on 17 June 1954
- Guy Vandersmissen, 1982 World Cup, vs Argentina on 13 June 1982
- Jacky Munaron, 1982 World Cup, vs Soviet Union on 1 July 1982

==== UEFA European Championship ====
Most inclusions in the squad for the European Championship finals
Yannick Carrasco, Kevin De Bruyne, Romelu Lukaku, Thomas Meunier, Jan Vertonghen & Axel Witsel (2016, 2020 & 2024), 3 final tournaments
Most appearances at the European Championship finals
Romelu Lukaku, 14 caps
Most consecutive appearances at the European Championship finals
Yannick Carrasco, Kevin De Bruyne, Romelu Lukaku & Jan Vertonghen (2016, 2020 & 2024), 3 final tournaments
Fewest appearances while still playing at the European Championship finals
Walter De Greef & Paul Lambrichts, 5 caps
Most appearances without ever playing at the European Championship finals
Timmy Simons, 94 caps
Appearances at most European Championship finals
Yannick Carrasco, Kevin De Bruyne, Romelu Lukaku & Jan Vertonghen (2016, 2020 & 2024), 3 final tournaments
Most non-playing selections for the European Championship finals
Simon Mignolet, 9 selections
Most non-playing selections for the European Championship finals without ever playing in the tournament
Simon Mignolet, 9 selections
Players to debut at the European Championship finals
Georges Grün, Euro 1984, vs Yugoslavia on 13 June 1984

== Goals ==
=== General ===
First goal
Georges Quéritet vs France on 1 May 1904

Most goals
Romelu Lukaku (2010–present), 94 (Note: This includes three goals in FIFA unrecognized friendlies)

As of 15 November 2026, the top ten players with the most goals for Belgium are:

(Goalscorers with an equal number of goals are ranked with the highest to lowest goals per game ratio.)

Romelu Lukaku is the all-time top scorer for Belgium with 94 goals.

Rank	Player	Belgium career	Goals	Caps	Position	Goals per game
1	Romelu Lukaku (list)	2010–2026	94	135	FW	0.7
2	Kevin De Bruyne	2010–	41	129	MF	0.32
3	Eden Hazard	2008–2022	33	126	MF/FW	0.26
4	Bernard Voorhoof	1928–1940	30	61	FW	0.49
4	Paul Van Himst	1960–1974	30	81	FW	0.37
6	Joseph Mermans	1945–1956	28	56	FW	0.5
6	Marc Wilmots	1990–2002	28	70	MF	0.4
8	Michy Batshuayi	2015–2024	27	55	FW	0.49
9	Robert De Veen	1906–1913	26	23	FW	1.13
9	Raymond Braine	1925–1939	26	54	FW	0.48

The records are collected based on data from FIFA and RSSSF.
Highlighted names denote a player still playing or available for selection.

Players with the highest goals per game ratio (greater than one)

As of 19 November 2019, the players with the highest goals per game ratio (greater than one) for Belgium are:

(Players with an equal goals per game ratio are ranked by the most goals scored.)

Rank	Player	Belgium career	Goals	Caps	Position	Goals per game
1	Jules Van Craen	1940	4	2	FW	2
1	Georges Quéritet	1904	2	1	FW	2
3	Maurice Willems	1956–1957	4	3	FW	1.3333
4	Robert De Veen	1906–1913	26	23	FW	1.1304

The records are collected based on data from FIFA and RSSSF.
Highlighted names denote a player still playing or available for selection.

Most goals in competitive matches
Romelu Lukaku, 68

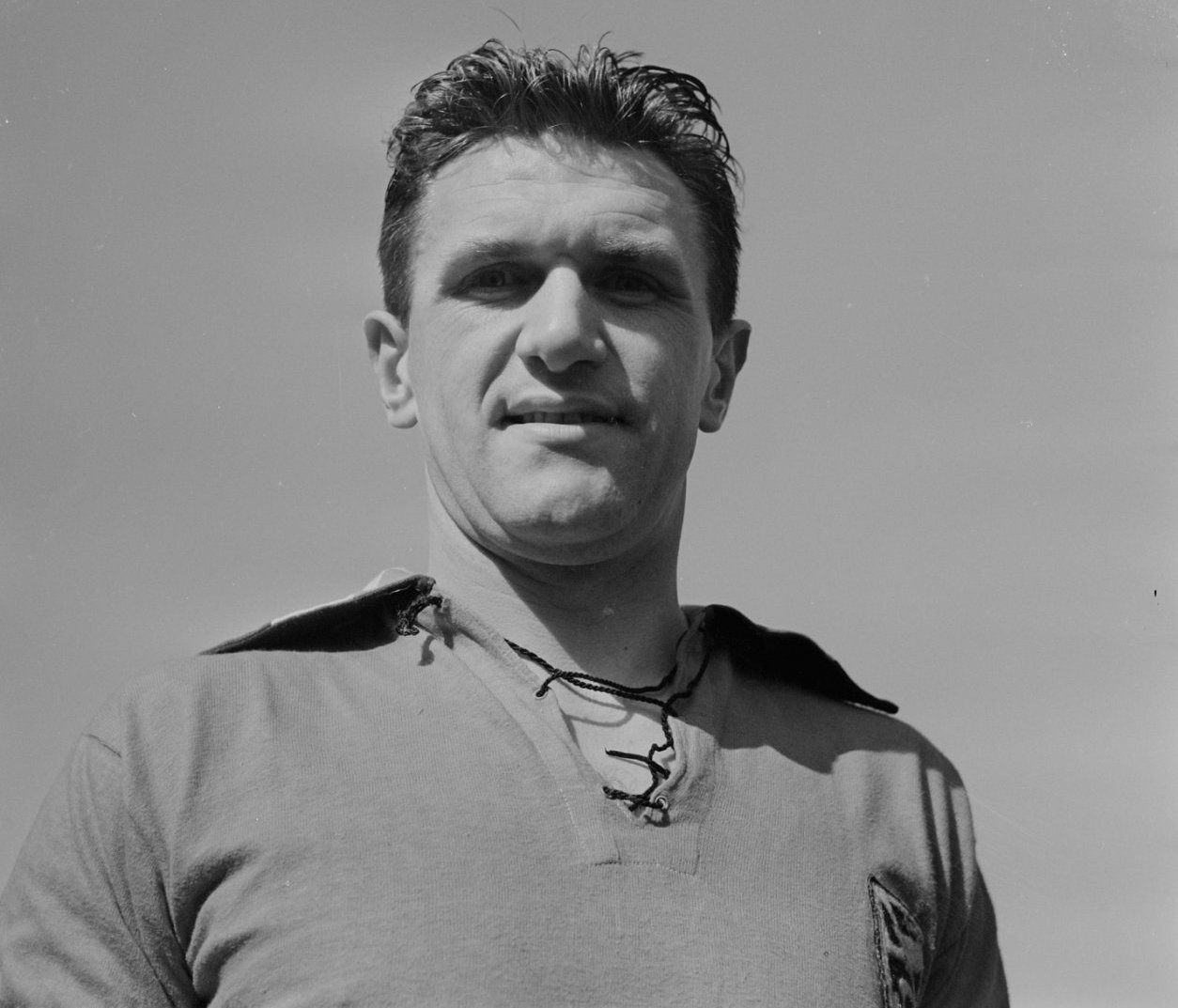
Jef Mermans scored in seven matches in a row.

Most consecutive matches scored in
Jef Mermans, 7
Most consecutive matches scored in starting with debut
Alphonse Six & Maurice Willems, 3 each
Most goals on debut
Josip Weber, 5 goals vs Zambia on 4 June 1994
Most matches played while scoring in each one
Maurice Willems, 3
Most goals in a single calendar year
Romelu Lukaku, 15 in 2023
Most goals scored by a defender
Daniel Van Buyten & Jan Vertonghen, 10 each

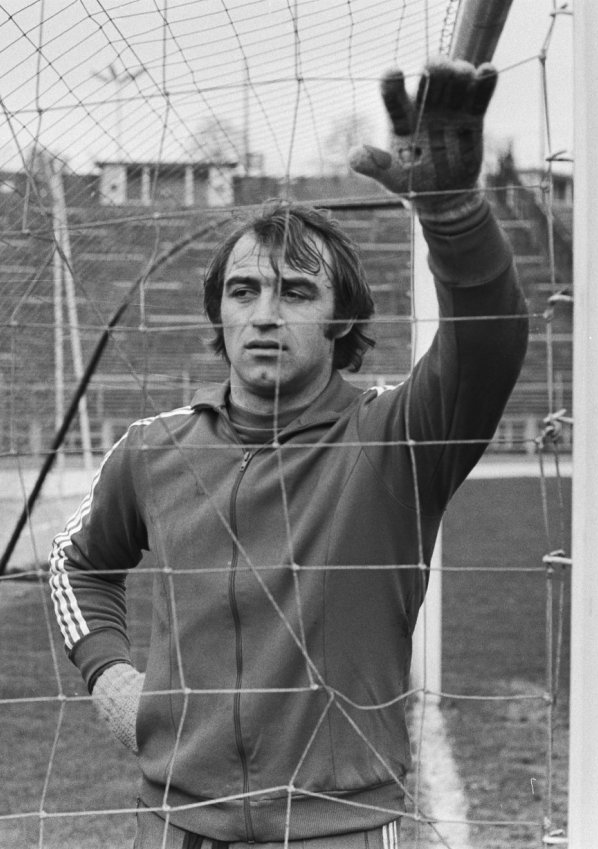
Christian Piot, the only goalkeeper ever to score a goal for Belgium

Most goals scored by a goalkeeper
Christian Piot, 1
First goal by a substitute
François Vanden Eynde, vs Irish Free State on 25 February 1934
Most goals scored as a substitute
Romelu Lukaku, 10
Most goals scored by a substitute in a single game
Bob Peeters, 3 goals vs San Marino on 28 February 2001
Most appearances without ever scoring
Thibaut Courtois, 115
Most appearances for an outfield player without ever scoring
Georges Heylens, 67
Most appearances needed to score his first goal
Franky Van der Elst, 79
Most goals scored in extra time

- Alphonse Six, 1 goal vs Netherlands on 13 May 1910
- Stéphane Demol, 1 goal vs Soviet Union on 15 June 1986
- Nico Claesen, 1 goal vs Soviet Union on 15 June 1986
- Romelu Lukaku, 1 goal vs United States on 1 July 2014
- Kevin De Bruyne, 1 goal vs United States on 1 July 2014
- Youri Tielemans, 1 goal vs Senegal on 1 July 2026

Latest goal scored by a player
Youri Tielemans vs Senegal on 1 July 2026, in the 120+5th minute
Latest goal conceded by a goalkeeper
Eddy de Neve (Netherlands) on 13 April 1905, in the 119th minute
Goals in three separate decades

- Bernard Voorhoof; 1 in 1928, 28 in the 1930s and 1 in 1940
- Erwin Vandenbergh; 1 in 1979, 18 in the 1980s and 1 in 1991
- Axel Witsel; 2 in the 2000s, 7 in the 2010s and 3 in the 2020s
- Jan Vertonghen; 1 in 2009, 8 in the 2010s and 1 in 2023

First Belgian goalscorer at the King Baudouin Stadium
August Hellemans (when it was still the Centenaire Stadium), Michaël Goossens (after it was renamed King Baudouin Stadium)
Scorers of own goals
Robert Hustin, Edgard Poelmans, Oscar Verbeeck, Émile Stijnen, Bob Paverick, Charles Saeys, Walter Meeuws, Régis Genaux, Philippe Albert, Timmy Simons, Olivier Deschacht, Bart Goor, Vincent Kompany, Nacer Chadli, Jan Vertonghen & Timothy Castagne

=== Hat-tricks ===
Most goals in a match

- Robert De Veen, 5 goals vs France on 30 April 1911
- Bert De Cleyn, 5 goals vs Luxembourg on 23 February 1946
- Josip Weber, 5 goals vs Zambia on 4 June 1994

Including unofficial games: Herbert Potts, 7 goals vs Netherlands B on 28 April 1901

Four goals in a match

- Marc Van Der Linden, vs Luxembourg on 1 June 1989 (most goals in an away match)
- Romelu Lukaku, vs Azerbaijan on 19 November 2023

Three goals in a match

- at 33 occasions, (Note: This includes 1 hat-trick in a by the FIFA unrecognized friendly) see the list of Belgium hat-tricks

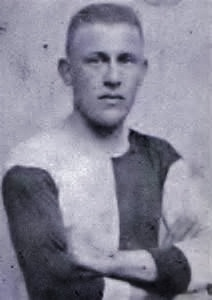
Belgium's 'hat-trick hero' Robert De Veen scored three hat-tricks.

Most hat-tricks
Romelu Lukaku, 4 times
Fastest hat-trick
Romelu Lukaku, 13 minutes, vs Azerbaijan on 19 November 2023
Fastest hat-trick as a substitute
Bob Peeters, 30 minutes, vs San Marino on 28 February 2001
Youngest player to score a hat-trick
Jean Capelle, 18 years, 7 months and 10 days, vs Denmark on 5 June 1932
Oldest player to score a hat-trick
Romelu Lukaku, 30 years, 6 months and 6 days, vs Azerbaijan on 19 November 2023
Highest number of different players to score (at least) a hat-trick in the same game

- 2, Sylvain Brébart (3) and Jean Van Cant (3), vs Germany on 23 November 1913
- 2, Josip Weber (5) and Marc Degryse (3), vs Zambia on 4 June 1994
- 2, Thomas Meunier (3) and Romelu Lukaku (3), vs Gibraltar on 31 August 2017

Hat-tricks at major tournaments
Robert Coppée, vs Spain on 29 August 1920 (at the 1920 Olympics)

=== Penalties ===
First player to score a penalty
Gaston Hubin vs France on 28 January 1912
Most goals scored from penalties
Eden Hazard, 10 goals
Most goals in penalty shoot-outs in competitive games (Note: Goals scored in penalty shoot-outs do not count on a player's overall scoring tally.)
Nico Claesen, Enzo Scifo, Hugo Broos, Patrick Vervoort & Leo Van der Elst, all 1 goal vs Spain on 22 June 1986
Most goals in penalty shoot-outs, including friendlies

- Nico Claesen, Enzo Scifo, Hugo Broos, Patrick Vervoort & Leo Van der Elst, all 1 goal vs Spain on 22 June 1986
- Eric Van Meir, Vital Borkelmans, Mbo Mpenza & Philippe Vande Walle, all 1 goal vs England on 29 May 1998

=== Fastest ===
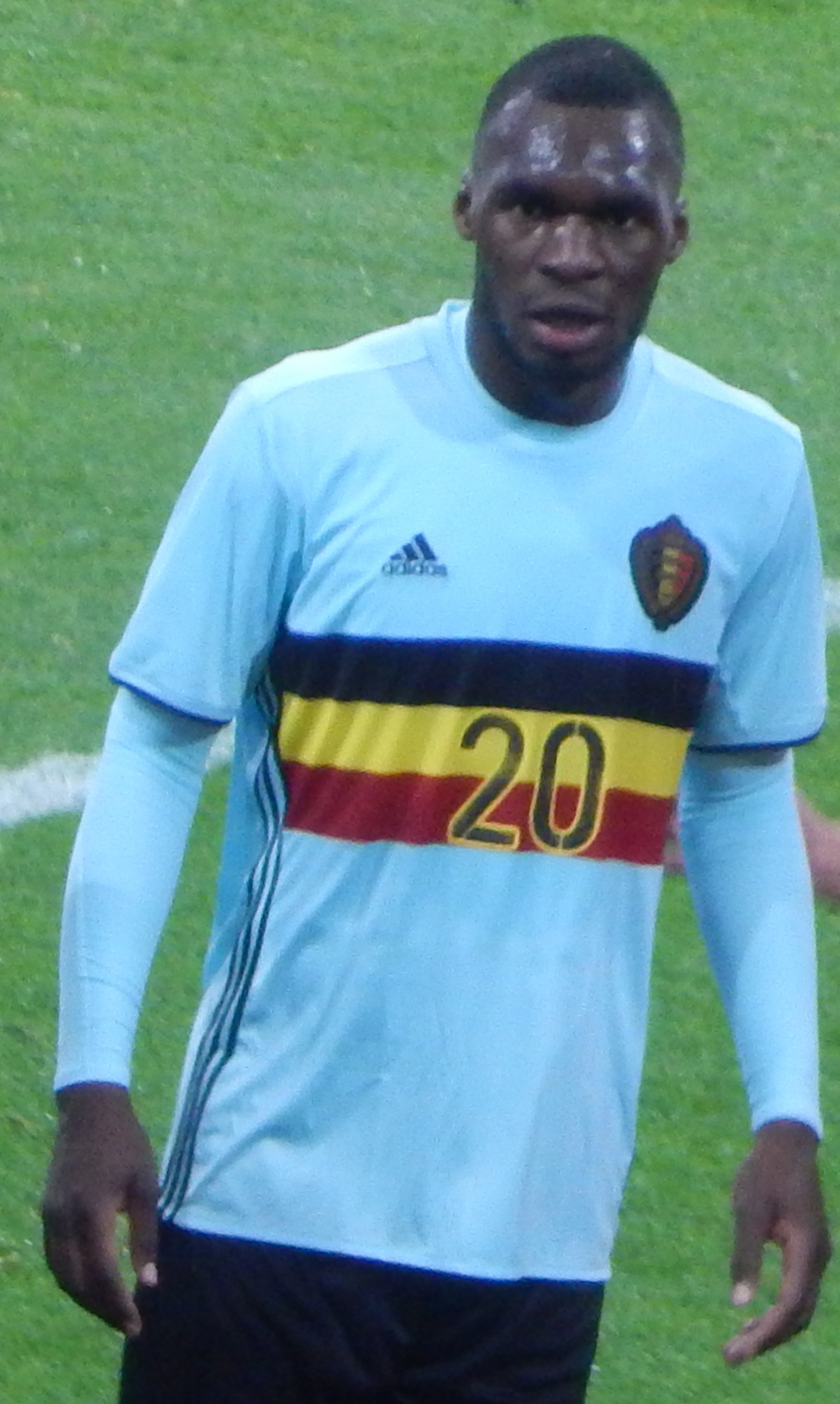
In 2016, Christian Benteke scored the quickest ever goal in a competitive international so far, 8.1 seconds after kick-off.

Fastest goal from kickoff
Christian Benteke, 8.1 seconds vs Gibraltar on 10 October 2016
Fastest goal in debut match (since World War II)
Tom Caluwé, 2 minutes and 52 seconds vs Saudi Arabia on 11 May 2006
Fastest goal by a substitute
Romelu Lukaku, 56 seconds vs New Zealand on 26 June 2026
Fastest goal at the World Cup finals
Thomas Meunier, 3 minutes and 36 seconds vs England on 14 July 2018
Fastest goal at the European Championship finals
Youri Tielemans, 1 minute and 13 seconds vs Romania on 22 June 2024

=== Age-related ===
Oldest goalscorer
Wilfried Van Moer, 37 years, 1 month and 27 days, vs Bulgaria on 28 April 1982
Youngest goalscorer
Fernand Nisot, 16 years, 10 months and 27 days, vs Netherlands on 10 March 1912
Oldest goalscorer at the World Cup finals
Kevin De Bruyne, 34 years, 11 months and 29 days, 2026 World Cup, vs New Zealand on 26 June 2026
Youngest goalscorer at the World Cup finals
Divock Origi, 19 years, 2 months and 4 days, 2014 World Cup, vs Russia on 22 June 2014
Oldest goalscorer at the European Championship finals
Julien Cools, 33 years, 4 months and 2 days, Euro 1980, vs Spain on 15 June 1980
Youngest goalscorer at the European Championship finals
Émile Mpenza, 21 years, 11 months and 6 days, Euro 2000, vs Sweden on 10 June 2000

=== On major tournaments ===
Most total goals at the World Cup and European Championship finals
Romelu Lukaku, 14 (1 at the 2014 World Cup, 2 at Euro 2016, 4 at the 2018 World Cup, 4 at Euro 2020 and 3 at the 2026 World Cup)
Most consecutive tournaments with a goal
Romelu Lukaku, 4 (1 goal at the 2014 World Cup, 2 goals at Euro 2016, 4 goals at the 2018 World Cup & 4 goals at Euro 2020)
Most goals at the Olympic Games finals
Robert Coppée (in 1920) & Raymond Braine (in 1928), 4 each
Most goals in an Olympic Games finals match
Robert Coppée, 3 goals vs Spain on 29 August 1920, 1920 Summer Olympics

==== FIFA World Cup ====
Most goals in a single World Cup tournament
Romelu Lukaku, 4 (2018)

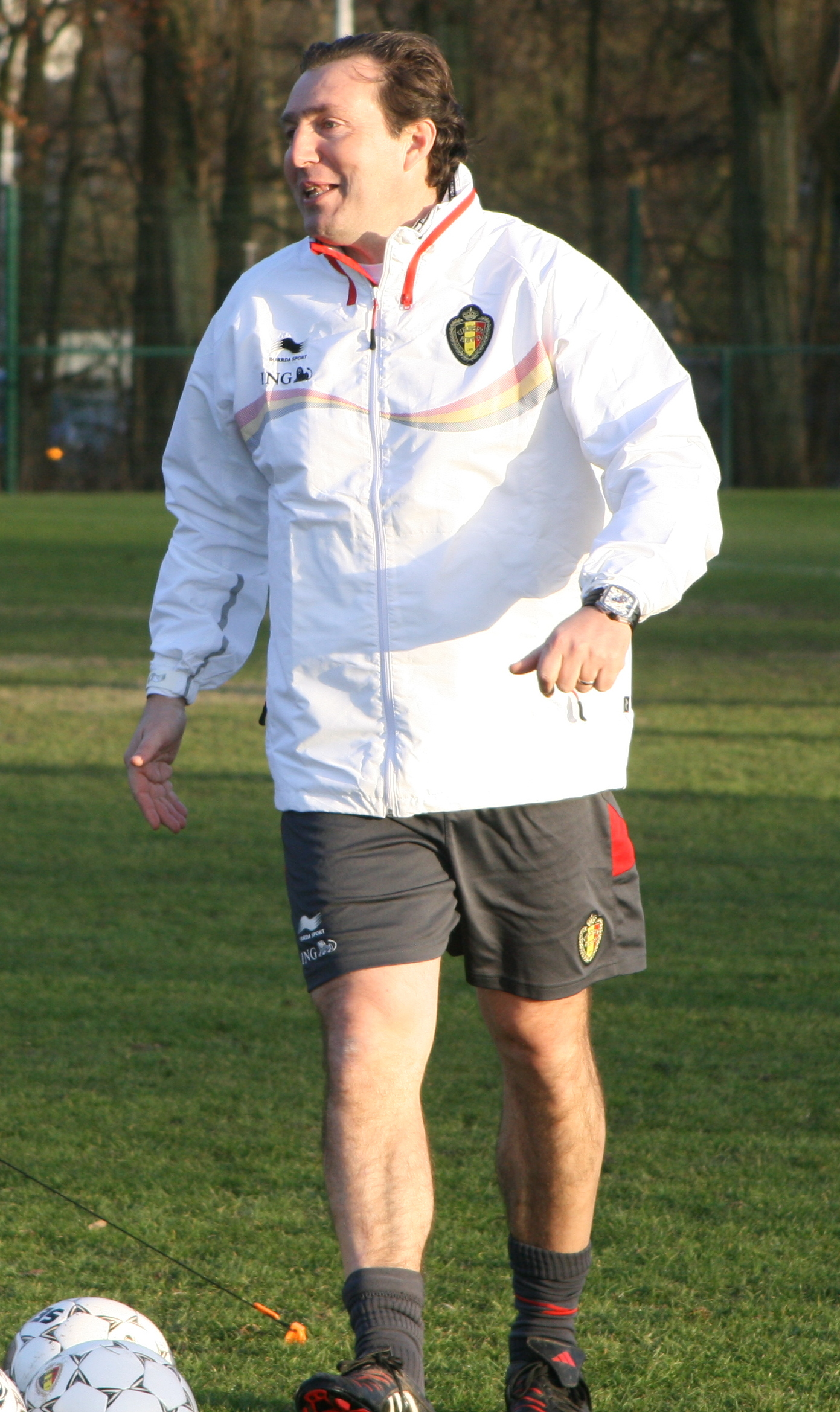
Marc Wilmots scored five goals for Belgium at the World Cup.

Most total goals at World Cup tournaments
Romelu Lukaku (2014, 2018 & 2026), 8
Most goals in a single World Cup qualifying campaign
Romelu Lukaku, 11 (2018 World Cup qualifying)
Most goals in a single World Cup finals match

- Bernard Voorhoof, 2 goals vs (Nazi Germany) Germany on 27 May 1934, 1934 World Cup
- Pol Anoul, 2 goals vs England on 17 June 1954, 1954 World Cup
- Wilfried Van Moer, 2 goals vs El Salvador on 3 June 1970, 1970 World Cup
- Marc Wilmots, 2 goals vs Mexico on 20 June 1998, 1998 World Cup
- Romelu Lukaku, 2 goals vs Panama on 18 June 2018 and 2 goals vs Tunisia on 23 June 2018, 2018 World Cup
- Eden Hazard, 2 goals vs Tunisia on 23 June 2018, 2018 World Cup
- Leandro Trossard, 2 goals vs New Zealand on 26 June 2026, 2026 World Cup
- Youri Tielemans, 2 goals vs Senegal on 1 July 2026, 2026 World Cup
- Charles De Ketelaere, 2 goals vs United States on 6 July 2026, 2026 World Cup

Most goals in a single World Cup qualifying match
Marc Van Der Linden, 4 goals vs Luxembourg on 1 June 1989, 1990 World Cup qualifying
First goal in a World Cup finals match
Bernard Voorhoof vs (Nazi Germany) Germany on 27 May 1934, 1934 World Cup
First goal in a World Cup qualifying campaign
Jean Capelle, vs Irish Free State on 25 February 1934, 1934 World Cup qualifying

==== UEFA European Championship ====
Most goals in a single European Championship tournament
Romelu Lukaku, 4 (2020)
Most goals in total at European Championship tournaments
Romelu Lukaku, 6 (2016 & 2020)
Most goals in a single European Championship qualifying campaign
Romelu Lukaku (Euro 2024 qualifying), 14
Most goals in a single European Championship finals match
Romelu Lukaku, 2 goals vs Republic of Ireland on 18 June 2016, Euro 2016, and 2 goals vs Russia on 12 June 2021, Euro 2020
Most goals in a single European Championship qualifying match

- Romelu Lukaku, 4 goals vs Azerbaijan on 19 November 2023, Euro 2024 qualifying

First goal in a European Championship finals match
Odilon Polleunis vs West Germany on 14 June 1972, Euro 1972
First goal in a European Championship qualifying campaign
Jacques Stockman vs Yugoslavia on 4 November 1962, Euro 1964 qualifying

== Captains ==
First captain
Camille Van Hoorden
Most appearances as captain
Eden Hazard, 59

=== Most captaincies ===
The following are the top ten players assigned as captain the most times (at the start of an international game):

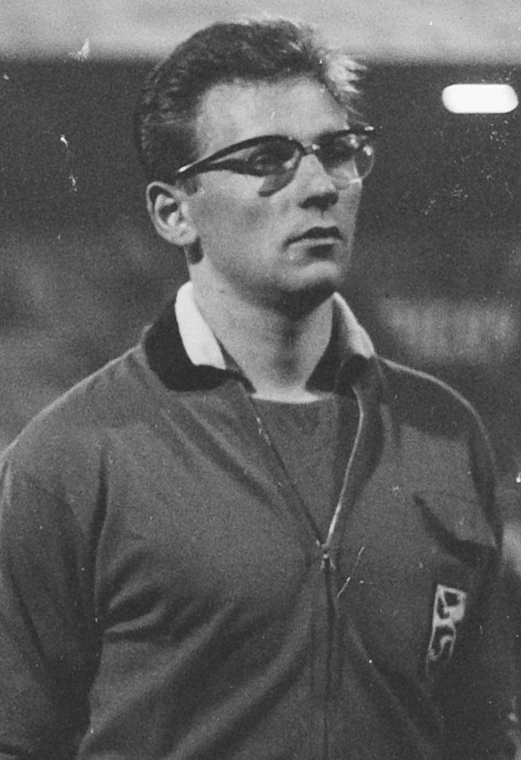
Jef Jurion, the third-most serving Belgium captain, became Belgian champion nine times with Anderlecht.

Correct as of 1 December 2022, after the match against Croatia.

Rank	Player	Captaincy	Times	Position
1	Eden Hazard	2015–2022	59	MF/FW
2	Jan Ceulemans	1984–1991	48	MF/FW
3	Jef Jurion	1960–1967	39	MF
4	Paul Van Himst	1964–1974	38	FW
4	Vincent Kompany	2010–2019	38	DF
6	Armand Swartenbroeks	1914–1928	37	DF
7	Timmy Simons	2004–2009	36	DF/MF
8	Jef Mermans	1949–1956	30	FW
9	Eric Gerets	1980–1991	26	DF
10	Georges Grün	1989–1995	25	DF

Highlighted names denote a player still playing or available for selection.

== Disciplinary ==
=== Red cards ===
2 expulsions
Eric Deflandre, Vincent Kompany & Axel Witsel

List of all Belgian players sent off once
Pierre Braine, Mathieu Bollen, Georges Heylens, Pierre Hanon, Walter Meeuws, Alexandre Czerniatynski, Philippe Albert, Pascal Renier, Gert Verheyen, Tjörven De Brul, Marc Wilmots, Filip De Wilde, Olivier De Cock, Bart Goor, Mousa Dembélé, Anthony Vanden Borre, Marouane Fellaini, Nicolas Lombaerts, Steven Defour, Amadou Onana & Nathan Ngoy

First player to get an expulsion
Pierre Braine, vs Czechoslovakia on 26 May 1927

First substitute to get an expulsion
Mathieu Bollen, vs Netherlands on 19 April 1959

First player to be expelled by receiving two yellow cards
Walter Meeuws, vs Netherlands on 14 October 1981

First substitute to be expelled by receiving two yellow cards
None

Youngest player to get an expulsion
Mousa Dembélé, aged 19 years, 2 months and 25 days, vs Azerbaijan on 11 October 2006

Oldest player to get an expulsion
Filip De Wilde, aged 35 years, 11 months and 14 days, vs Turkey on 8 June 2000

Fastest expulsion by a starting player
27 minutes, Eric Deflandre vs Scotland on 24 March 2001

Fastest expulsion by a substitute
3 minutes, Alexandre Czerniatynski, vs Hungary on 6 June 1984

Fastest expulsion by receiving two yellow cards
29 minutes, Eric Deflandre, vs Spain on 9 October 2004

Shortest time between two yellow cards
0 minutes, Eric Deflandre, vs Spain on 9 October 2004

Devils Goor and Deflandre red from anger

— Word-play in a 2004 newspaper heading. Only in one match of Belgium so far, two players received a red card. Both were very displeased with their five- and three-day suspensions afterwards.

Highest number of expulsions of Belgian players in a single game
2 expulsions: Eric Deflandre and Bart Goor, vs Spain on 9 October 2004

Highest total number of expulsions in a single game
3 expulsions; Georges Heylens, Dobrivoje Trivić & Dragan Džajić, vs Yugoslavia on 16 October 1968

=== Yellow cards ===
First player to get a yellow card
Odilon Polleunis, vs Spain on 23 February 1969

First player to get a yellow card as a substitute
François Van der Elst, vs Netherlands on 25 April 1976

Youngest player to get a yellow card
Anthony Vanden Borre, 17 years, 11 months and 14 days, vs Spain on 8 October 2005

Oldest player to get a yellow card
Axel Witsel, 37 years, 5 months and 28 days, vs Spain on 10 July 2026

Highest total of yellow cards received
18, Vincent Kompany & Jan Vertonghen

== Miscellaneous ==
Player born on the earliest date
Joseph Romdenne, born in 1876, received his only cap on 14 May 1905 vs Netherlands
First appearance by a player born in the 20th century
Cornelius Elst (born on 25 January 1901) on 21 May 1922 vs Italy
Last appearance by a player born in the 19th century
Nicolas Hoydonckx (born on 29 December 1900) on 26 November 1933 vs Denmark
First appearance by a player born in the 21st century
Yari Verschaeren (born on 12 July 2001) on 9 September 2019 vs Scotland
First substitute
Georges Mathot replaced Charles Cambier after 46 minutes vs Netherlands on 26 April 1908
Earliest time in the game to be substituted off
Vincent Kompany, vs San Marino on 7 September 2005, in the 12th minute
First substitute who was substituted off again in the same game
Branko Strupar vs Algeria on 14 May 2002
Shortest time between being subbed on and being subbed off
Christophe Lepoint vs Finland on 11 August 2010, 15 minutes
Most substitutions in one game

- 10, vs United States on 28 March 2026
- 10, vs Mexico on 31 March 2026

Most simultaneous substitutions

- 6, at half-time vs Yugoslavia on 19 May 1986
- 6, at half-time vs Algeria on 14 May 2002

First game that went into extra time
On 30 April 1905, vs Netherlands

Oranje team beaten by playful 'Anderlecht'

— Dutch 1964 newspaper heading. It pointed to the fact that at a certain moment in Belgium's 1–0 win over the Netherlands all Belgians on the pitch came out for RSC Anderlecht

Club providing the most Belgian internationals in a single match
Anderlecht, 11; in the match vs Netherlands on 30 September 1964, all outfield players in the second half were from Anderlecht.
Belgian players who later became manager/head coach
Hector Goetinck, François Demol, André Vandewyer, Guy Thys, Walter Meeuws, Paul Van Himst, Wilfried Van Moer, Georges Leekens, René Vandereycken, Franky Vercauteren (caretaker) and Marc Wilmots

=== Penalties ===
Most saves in penalty shoot-outs in competitive games
Jean-Marie Pfaff, 1 vs Spain (penalty of Eloy Olaya) on 22 June 1986
Most saves in penalty shoot-outs, including friendlies
Philippe Vande Walle, 2 vs England (penalties by Rob Lee and Les Ferdinand) on 29 May 1998
Most misses in penalty shoot-outs in competitive games
None
Most misses in penalty shoot-outs, including friendlies
Enzo Scifo, 1 vs England on 29 May 1998

=== Clean sheets ===
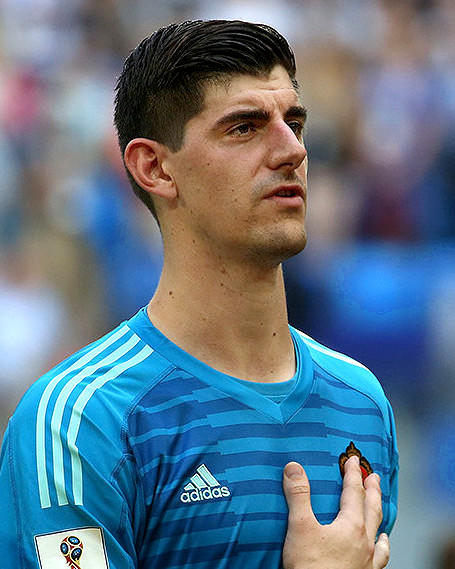
Thibaut Courtois holds the record for clean sheets.

Most clean sheets
Thibaut Courtois, 57
Most clean sheets in competitive matches
Thibaut Courtois, 46
Most clean sheets in total at the World Cup and European Championship finals
Thibaut Courtois, 14 (2 at the 2014 World Cup, 3 at Euro 2016, 3 at the 2018 World Cup, 3 at Euro 2020, 2 at the 2022 World Cup and 1 at the 2026 World Cup)
Most clean sheets in a single World Cup tournament
Thibaut Courtois, 3 (2018)
Most clean sheets in total at World Cup tournaments
Thibaut Courtois, 8 (2 in 2014, 3 in 2018, 2 in 2022 and 1 in 2026)
Most clean sheets in a single European Championship tournament
Thibaut Courtois, 3 (2016 and 2020)
Most clean sheets in total at European Championship tournaments
Thibaut Courtois, 6 (3 in 2016 and 3 in 2020)
Most clean sheets in a single Olympic Games finals tournament
Jean De Bie, 2 (1920)
Most clean sheets in total at the Olympic Games finals
Jean De Bie, 2 (both in 1920)
