= List of Club Brugge KV head coaches =

Club Brugge KV is a football club based in Bruges in Belgium. It was founded in 1891 and is one of the top clubs in Belgium.

Club Brugge KV has had 48 permanent and six caretaker managers since the club's founding. Georges Leekens, who managed the team during two separate periods (1989–91 and 2012), is one of the few managers to return for a second spell.

This chronological list includes all individuals who have held the position of head coach for Club Brugge KV's first team.

== List of head coaches ==
Below is the official list of head coaches in the history of Club Brugge KV

- (Belgium) Hector Goetinck (1930–33)
- (Belgium) Gérard Delbeke (1933–34)
- (Belgium) Arthur Volckaert (1934–36)
- (Austria) Karl Schrenk (1936–38)
- (Belgium) Robert De Veen (1938–39)
- (Belgium) Gérard Delbeke (1939–45)
- (Belgium) Louis Versyp (1945–50)
- (Scotland) William Kennedy (1950–51)
- (Belgium) Félix Schavy (1951–57)
- (Romania) Norberto Höfling (1957–63)
- (Chile) (Hungary) Juan Schwanner (1963)
- (Belgium) Henri Dekens (1963–65)
- (France) (Czechoslovakia) Ludwig Dupal (1965–67)
- (Romania) Norberto Höfling (1967–68)
- (Socialist Federal Republic of Yugoslavia) Milorad Pavić (1968–69)
- (Netherlands) Frans de Munck (1969–71)
- (Netherlands) Leo Canjels (1971–73)
- (Netherlands) Jacques de Wit (1973–74)
- (Austria) Ernst Happel (1974–78)
- (Hungary) András Béres (1 July 1978 – 30 June 1979)
- (Belgium) Mathieu Bollen (1979)
- (Netherlands) Han Grijzenhout (1979–80)
- (France) Gilbert Gress (1 July 1980 – 30 June 1981)
- (Luxembourg) Antoine "Spitz" Kohn (1 July 1981 – 30 November 1981)
- (Belgium) Henri Coppens (1981–82)
- (Belgium) Raymond Mertens (1981–82)
- (Germany) Georg Keßler (1982–84)
- (Netherlands) Henk Houwaart (1 July 1984 – 30 June 1989)
- (Belgium) Georges Leekens (1 July 1989 – 30 June 1991)
- (Belgium) Hugo Broos (1 July 1991 – 1 July 1997)
- (Belgium) Eric Gerets (1 July 1997 – 30 June 1999)
- (Belgium) René Verheyen (1 July 1999 – 30 June 2000)
- (Norway) Trond Sollied (1 July 2000 – 30 June 2005)
- (Belgium) Jan Ceulemans (1 July 2005 – 3 April 2006)
- (Belgium) Emilio Ferrera (3 April 2006 – 28 January 2007)
- (North Macedonia) Čedomir Janevski (28 January 2007 – 30 June 2007)
- (Belgium) Jacky Mathijssen (1 July 2007 – 30 June 2009)
- (Netherlands) Adrie Koster (1 July 2009 – 30 October 2011)
- (Belgium) Rudy Verkempinck (interim) (31 October 2011 – 9 November 2011)
- (Germany) Christoph Daum (9 November 2011 – 14 May 2012)
- (Belgium) Georges Leekens (14 May 2012 – 5 November 2012)
- (Spain) Juan Carlos Garrido (15 November 2012 – 19 September 2013)
- (Belgium) Michel Preud'homme (19 September 2013 – 8 June 2017)
- (Croatia) Ivan Leko (8 June 2017 – 21 May 2019)
- (Belgium) Philippe Clement (29 May 2019 – 3 January 2022)
- (Netherlands) Alfred Schreuder (3 January 2022 – 12 May 2022)
- (Belgium) Carl Hoefkens (1 July 2022 – 27 December 2022)
- (England) Scott Parker (31 December 2022 – 8 March 2023)
- (Norway) Ronny Deila (1 July 2023 – 18 March 2024)
- (Belgium) Nicky Hayen (18 March 2024 – 8 December 2025)
- (Croatia) Ivan Leko ( 8 December 2025 – )
