= 1947–48 in Belgian football =

Football in Belgium
- Season: 1947–48

The 1947–48 season was the 45th season of competitive football in Belgium. RFC Malinois won their 3rd Premier Division title. The Belgium national football team played 6 friendly games of which they won only one, against France.

== Overview ==
At the end of the season, R Uccle Sport and K Lierse SK were relegated to Division I, while RC Mechelen KM (Division I A winner) and R Tilleur FC (Division I B winner) were promoted to the Premier Division.
K Tubantia FC, AS Renaisienne, Mol Sport and R Fléron FC were relegated from Division I to Promotion, to be replaced by RUS Tournaisienne, RCS Verviétois, US Centre and Sint-Truidense VV.

== National team ==
Date	Venue	Opponents	Score*	Comp	Belgium scorers
September 21, 1947	Heysel Stadium, Brussels (H)	England	2-5	F	Joseph Mermans, Albert De Cleyn
November 2, 1947	Charmilles Stadium, Genève (A)	Switzerland	0-4	F
March 14, 1948	Bosuilstadion, Antwerp (H)	The Netherlands	1-1	F	August Van Steelant
April 18, 1948	Feijenoord Stadion, Rotterdam (A)	The Netherlands	2-2	F	Joseph Mermans, August Van Steelant
April 28, 1948	Hampden Park, Glasgow (A)	Scotland	0-2	F
June 6, 1948	Heysel Stadium, Brussels (H)	France	4-2	F	Frédéric Chaves d'Aguilar (2), Henri Govard, Joseph Mermans

* Belgium score given first

Key

- H = Home match
- A = Away match
- N = On neutral ground
- F = Friendly
- o.g. = own goal

== Honours ==
Competition	Winner
Premier Division	RFC Malinois
Division I	RC Mechelen KM and R Tilleur FC
Promotion	RUS Tournaisienne, RCS Verviétois, US Centre and Sint-Truidense VV

== Final league tables ==
=== Premier Division ===
Top scorer: Jef Mermans (RSC Anderlechtois) with 23 goals.
