= Edmond Machtens Stadium =

Football stadium in Brussels, Belgium

- Stade Edmond Machtens (French); Edmond Machtensstadion (Dutch)
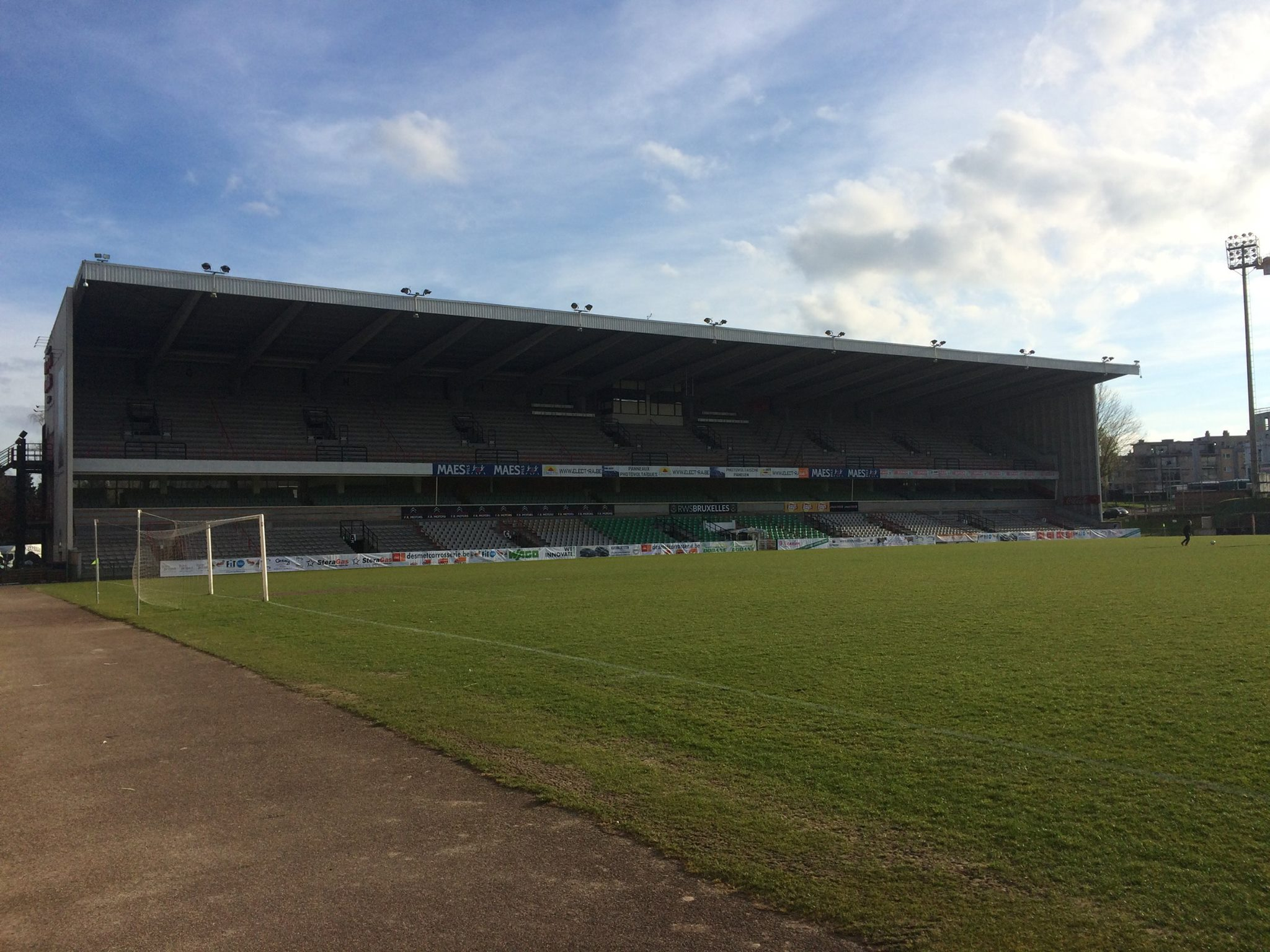
- Edmond Machtens Stadium
- Interactive map of Edmond Machtens Stadium
- Former names: Oscar Bossaert Stadium
- Location: Avenue Charles Malis / Charles Malislaan 61, 1080 Molenbeek-Saint-Jean, Brussels-Capital Region, Belgium
- Coordinates: 50°51′18″N 4°18′40″E
- Capacity: 12,266

Construction
- Opened: 12 September 1920
- Renovated: 1973 and 1993

Tenant
- RWDM Brussels (2015–present)

The Edmond Machtens Stadium (French: Stade Edmond Machtens; Dutch: Edmond Machtensstadion) is a football stadium in the municipality of Molenbeek-Saint-Jean in Brussels, Belgium. It was the home ground of Belgian Second Division club FC Molenbeek Brussels Strombeek until its dissolution in 2014. Prior to this, it was home to R White Daring Molenbeek and of R Daring Club de Bruxelles. Since 2015 when it was formed, it is home to phoenix club RWD Molenbeek. The stadium has a capacity of 12,266.

The stadium is named after Edmond Machtens, a former mayor of Molenbeek between 1939 and 1978. It was formerly known as the Oscar Bossaert Stadium (French: Stade Oscar Bossaert; Dutch: Oscar Bossaertstadion) and hosted a number of matches of the Belgium national football team in the 1920s, as well as a friendly game against France in 1945. Oscar Bossaert was a former Daring Club de Bruxelles player and industrialist.

== Features ==
The stadium comprises three stands: one behind a goal with only standing places, and the other two are seated and located along the ground. Behind the second goal is a tree row that darkens the field in a special way. There are also 622 places in the business seats. In 2005, stand 2 was renamed stand Raymond Goethals in memory of the former player and manager.
