= Armand Swartenbroeks =

Belgian footballer (1892-1980)

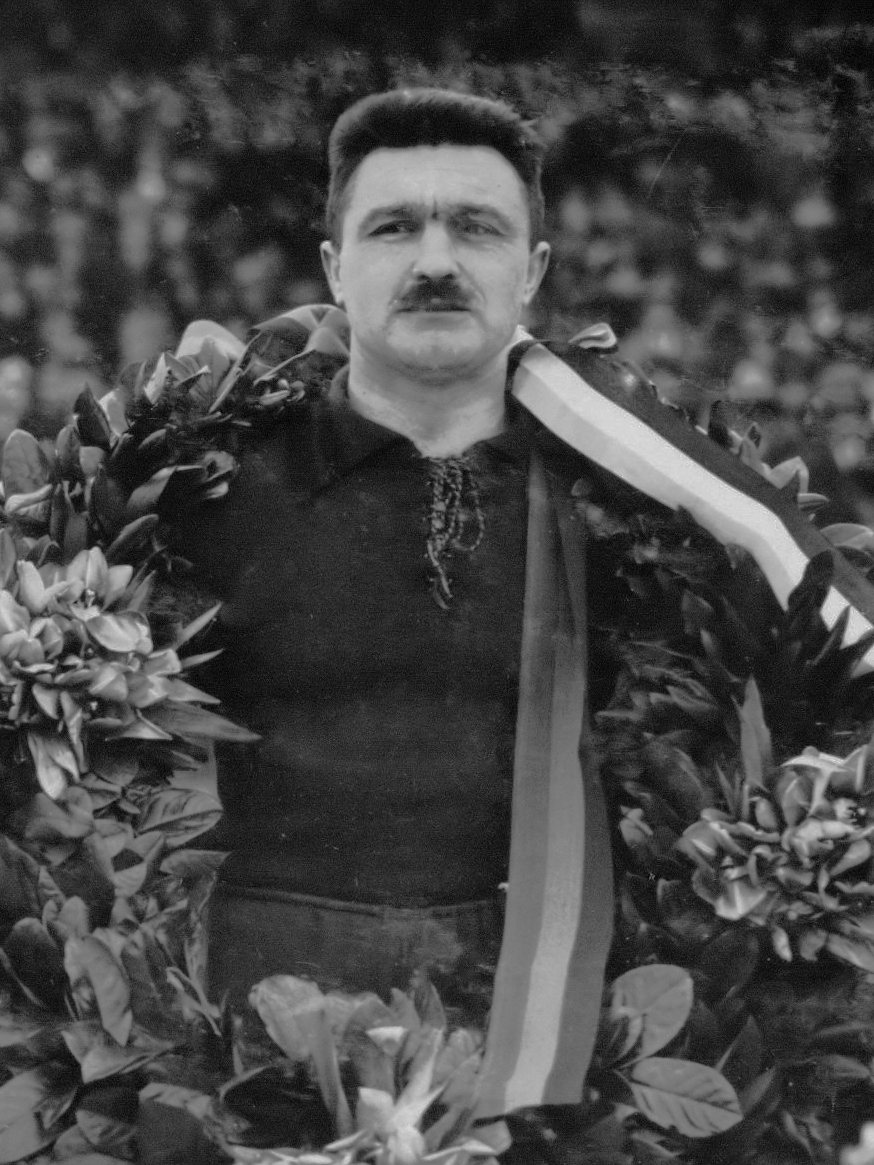
- Swartenbroeks in 1928

Personal information
- Full name: Armand Joseph Antoine Alexis Swartenbroecks
- Date of birth: 30 June 1892
- Date of death: 3 October 1980 (aged 88)

Youth career
- 1909–1910: Higher SC
- 1910–1911: Victoria FC Sint-Agatha-Berchem

Senior career*
Years	Team	Apps	(Gls)
1911-1930	Daring Club de Bruxelles	295	(28)
Total		295	(28)

International career
1913-1928	Belgium	53	(0)
- * Club domestic league appearances and goals

Olympic medal record

Men's Football
Gold medal – first place	1920 Antwerp	Team competition

Armand J. Swartenbroeks (30 June 1892 – 3 October 1980) was a Belgian football (soccer) player who competed in the 1920 Summer Olympics. He was a member of the Belgian team, which won the gold medal in the football tournament.

== Honours ==
=== Club ===
==== Daring Club de Bruxelles ====
- Belgian First Division: 1911–12, 1913–14, 1920–21

=== International ===
==== Belgium ====
- Olympic Gold Medal: 1920

=== Individual ===
- Former Belgium's Most Capped Player: 1928–1938 (50 caps)
