= Éric Deflandre =

Belgian footballer

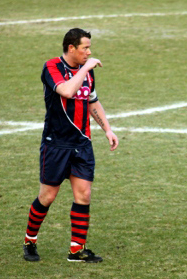
- Deflandre in 2011

Personal information
- Date of birth: 2 August 1973 (age 53)
- Place of birth: Rocourt, Belgium
- Height: 1.81 m (5 ft 11 in)
- Position: Right back

Senior career*
Years	Team	Apps	(Gls)
1991–1995	RFC Liège	93	(1)
1995–1996	Germinal Ekeren	32	(2)
1996–2000	Club Brugge	118	(1)
2000–2004	Lyon	91	(0)
2004–2007	Standard Liège	76	(1)
2007	FC Brussels	14	(0)
2008–2009	FC Dender	34	(0)
2009–2010	Lierse	20	(0)
2010–2012	RFC Liège	7	(0)
Total		485	(5)

International career
1996–2005	Belgium	57	(0)

Managerial career
- 2012–2015: Standard Liège (youth)
- 2015–: Standard Liège (assistant)
- * Club domestic league appearances and goals

Éric Deflandre (born 2 August 1973) is a Belgian former professional footballer who played as a right-back.

== Club career ==
Deflandre was born in Rocourt. He first signed to Wandre Union but after one year he joined Liège side RFC Liège. He then left for Germinal Ekeren in 1995.

In 1996, he signed for Club Brugge.

In 2000, Deflandre moved to Lyon in France, where he won three straight national championships.

He returned to Belgium in 2004 and played for Standard Liège.

In 2007–08, he split duty with FC Brussels and FC Dender On 25 June 2009, he signed for Lierse on a two-year deal. On 9 August 2010, it was announced he would return to RFC Liège, where he played for two more seasons before retiring.

== International career ==
Deflandre played his debut match for the Belgium national team against The Netherlands in the qualifying stage for the 1998 World Cup. In the competition's first match, he replaced Bertrand Crasson after 22 minutes, and helped to a 0–0 draw against the Netherlands.

He also appeared for the national side at Euro 2000 and 2002 World Cup. In Euro 2000, he substituted as a goalkeeper after Filip De Wilde was sent off against Turkey.

== Career statistics ==
=== International ===
Appearances and goals by national team and year
National team	Year	Apps	Goals
Belgium	1996	1	0
Belgium	1997	2	0
Belgium	1998	9	0
Belgium	1999	6	0
Belgium	2000	9	0
Belgium	2001	8	0
Belgium	2002	7	0
Belgium	2003	6	0
Belgium	2004	7	0
Belgium	2005	2	0
Total		57	0

== Honours ==
Club Brugge

- Belgian First Division: 1997–98
- Belgian Supercup: 1998

Lyon

- French First Division: 2001–02, 2002–03, 2003–04
- French Supercup: 2003

Belgium

- FIFA Fair Play Trophy: 2002 World Cup
