= André Stassart =

Belgian footballer

Personal information
- Date of birth: 29 September 1937 (age 89)

International career
Years	Team	Apps	(Gls)
1967–1971	Belgium	5	(0)

André Stassart (born 29 September 1937) is a Belgian footballer. He played in five matches for the Belgium national football team from 1967 to 1971.
