= Marcel Feye =

Belgian footballer

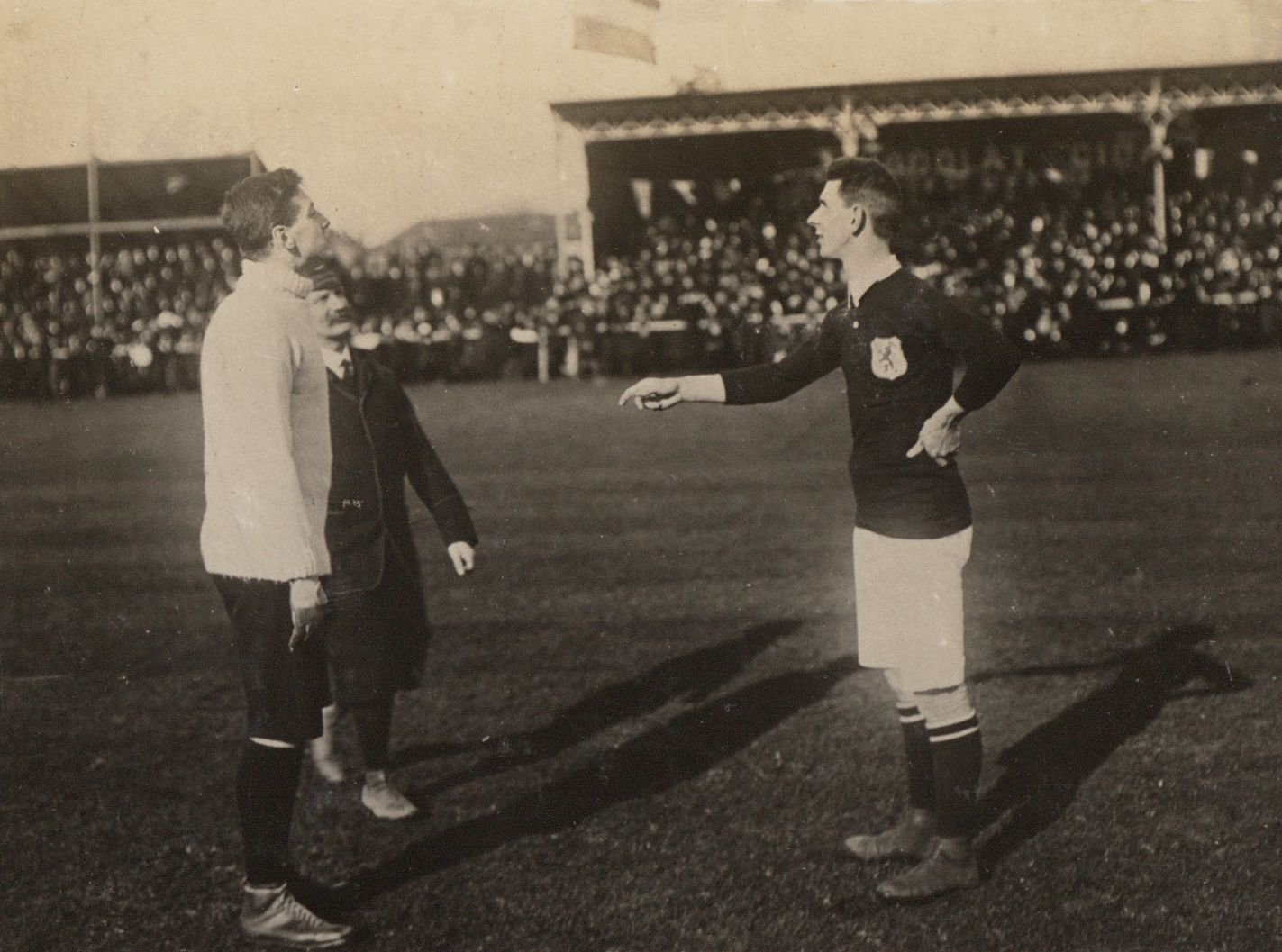

Personal information
- Date of birth: 8 March 1883
- Date of death: 8 October 1965 (aged 82)

International career
| Years | Team | Apps | (Gls) |
| 1907–1910 | Belgium | 5 | (0) |

Marcel Feye (8 March 1883 – 8 October 1965) was a Belgian footballer. He played in five matches for the Belgium national football team from 1907 to 1910.
