= Jean De Bie =

Belgian footballer

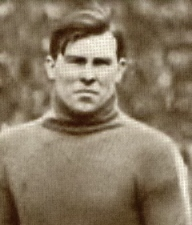

Personal information
- Full name: Jean Baptiste De Bie
- Date of birth: 9 May 1892
- Place of birth: Molenbeek-Saint-Jean, Bruxelles-Capitale, Belgium
- Date of death: 30 April 1961 (aged 68)
- Place of death: Brussels, Belgium
- Height: 1.84 m (6 ft 1/2 in)
- Position: Goalkeeper

Senior career*
Years	Team	Apps	(Gls)
1919–1936	Royal Racing Club de Bruxelles	299	(0)

International career
1920–1930	Belgium	37	(0)
Medal record
Men's football
Representing Belgium
Olympic Games
Gold medal – first place	1920 Antwerp	Team
- * Club domestic league appearances and goals

Jean Baptiste De Bie (9 May 1892 – 30 April 1961) was a Belgian association football player. He played as a goalkeeper.

During his career, he played mostly for Royal Racing Club de Bruxelles. He won the gold medal at the 1920 Summer Olympics playing for Belgium national football team and, at 38 years of age, he was selected in the Belgian squad for the 1930 FIFA World Cup. However, he never played a match at the tournament. No other player who has participated in a FIFA World Cup was born earlier than him.
