= Frans Christiaens =

Belgian footballer

Personal information
- Date of birth: 20 January 1914
- Place of birth: Lier, Belgium
- Date of death: 5 April 1943 (aged 29)
- Place of death: Mortsel, Belgium

International career
Years	Team	Apps	(Gls)
1935–1936	Belgium	5	(0)

Frans Christiaens (20 January 1914 – 5 April 1943) was a Belgian footballer. He played in five matches for the Belgium national football team from 1935 to 1936.

== Football career ==
A goalkeeper, Christiaens' club lifelong was his native town's Lierse SK, playing in its youth team from 1925 to 1930, senior team thereafter.

== Personal life and death ==
A sheet metal worker by trade, he was born at Lier, Belgium. Christiaens was killed during the Second World War during an American air raid on Mortsel, Belgium, on 5 April 1943.
