= Léon Aernaudts =

Belgian footballer

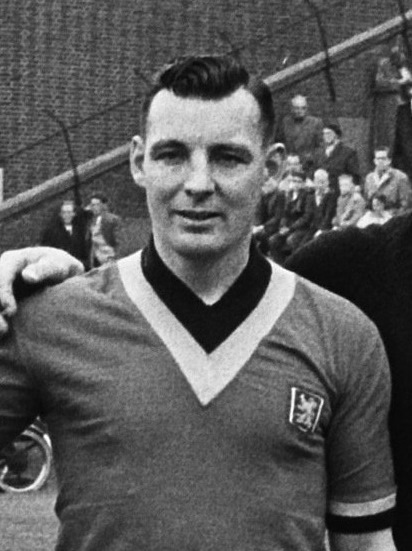

Personal information
- Date of birth: 10 August 1918
- Place of birth: Bergen op Zoom, Netherlands
- Date of death: 20 November 1992 (aged 74)
- Position: Defender

International career
Years	Team	Apps	(Gls)
1947–1950	Belgium	20	(0)

Léon Aernaudts (10 August 1918 – 20 November 1992) was a Belgian footballer. He played in 20 matches for the Belgium national football team from 1947 to 1950.
