= Georges Van Calenberg =

Belgian footballer (1912–1973)

Personal information
- Date of birth: 6 December 1912
- Date of death: 28 June 1973 (aged 60)

International career
Years	Team	Apps	(Gls)
1939–1940	Belgium	8	(0)

Georges Van Calenberg (6 December 1912 – 28 June 1973) was a Belgian footballer. He played in eight matches for the Belgium national football team from 1939 to 1940.
