= Hector Raemaekers =

Belgian footballer

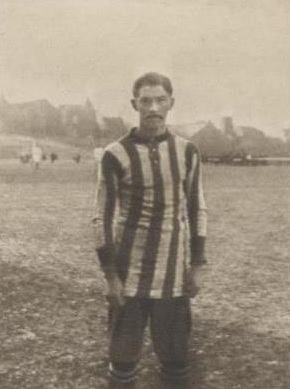

Personal information
- Date of birth: 8 September 1883
- Date of death: 3 December 1963 (aged 80)

International career
Years	Team	Apps	(Gls)
1905–1913	Belgium	12	(0)

Hector Raemaekers (8 September 1883 – 3 December 1963) was a Belgian footballer. He played in twelve matches for the Belgium national football team from 1905 to 1913.

Raemakers made his debut in 1902 as a defender in the first team of Racing Club Brussels. Raemaekers became national champion twice with RCB (1903 and 1908), and runner-up three times (1904, 1905 and 1907). In 1912 the Belgian Cup was won, but his football career was interrupted by the First World War. After the resumption of the competition in 1919, Raemaekers played one more season at Racing and then ended his playing career at the highest level. Raemaekers played a total of 173 matches in the First Division and scored 10 goals.
