= René Gillard =

Belgian footballer

Personal information
- Date of birth: 11 November 1920

International career
Years	Team	Apps	(Gls)
1949	Belgium	6	(0)

René Gillard (born 11 November 1920, date of death unknown) was a Belgian footballer. He played in six matches for the Belgium national football team in 1949.
