= Alphonse Wright =

Belgian footballer

Personal information
- Date of birth: 2 September 1887
- Date of death: 10 November 1953 (aged 66)

International career
Years	Team	Apps	(Gls)
1906–1907	Belgium	5	(0)

Alphonse Wright (2 September 1887 – 10 November 1953) was a Belgian footballer. He played in five matches for the Belgium national football team from 1906 to 1907.
