= Edgard Van Boxtaele =

Belgian footballer

Personal information
- Date of birth: 2 December 1888
- Date of death: 16 April 1958 (aged 69)

International career
| Years | Team | Apps | (Gls) |
| 1908–1911 | Belgium | 9 | (0) |

Edgard Van Boxtaele (2 December 1888 – 16 April 1958) was a Belgian footballer. He played in nine matches for the Belgium national football team from 1908 to 1911.
