= Louis Vandenbergh =

Belgian footballer

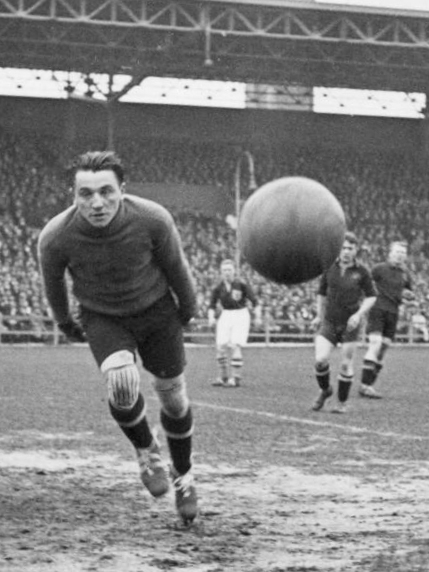
- Louis Vandenbergh in 1932

Personal information
- Date of birth: 26 November 1903
- Position: Goalkeeper

International career
Years	Team	Apps	(Gls)
1928–1933	Belgium	11	(0)

Louis Vandenbergh (born 26 November 1903, date of death unknown) was a Belgian footballer. He played in eleven matches for the Belgium national football team from 1928 to 1933.
