= Charles Bauwens =

Belgian footballer

International career
Years	Team	Apps	(Gls)
1910–1912	Belgium	6	(0)

Charles Bauwens was a Belgian footballer. He played in six matches for the Belgium national football team from 1910 to 1912.
