= Georges Mathot =

Belgian footballer

Personal information
- Date of birth: 26 February 1886

International career
Years	Team	Apps	(Gls)
1908	Belgium	2	(0)

Georges Mathot (born 26 February 1886, date of death unknown) was a Belgian footballer. He played in two matches for the Belgium national football team in 1908.
