= Joseph Romdenne =

Belgian footballer

Personal information
- Full name: Joseph Ghislain Romdenne
- Date of birth: 16 May 1877
- Place of birth: Brussels
- Date of death: 6 October 1946 (aged 69)
- Place of death: Saint-Gilles

Senior career*
| Years | Team | Apps | (Gls) |
| 1895–1896 | SC Bruxelles | | |
| 1897–1898 | A&RC Bruxelles | | |
| 1899–1905 | Union Saint-Gilloise | | |

International career
| 1905 | Belgium | 1 | (0) |
- * Club domestic league appearances and goals

Joseph Romdenne (16 May 1877 – 6 October 1946) was a Belgian footballer. He played in one match for the Belgium national football team in 1905.
