= Jean Valet =

Belgian footballer

Personal information
- Date of birth: 5 March 1923
- Place of birth: Ixelles, Belgium
- Date of death: 4 October 1984 (aged 61)

International career
| Years | Team | Apps | (Gls) |
| 1951 | Belgium | 1 | (0) |

Jean Valet (French: [ʒɑ̃ valɛ]; 5 March 1923 – 4 October 1984) was a Belgian footballer. He played in one match for the Belgium national football team in 1951.
