= Prosper Braeckman =

Belgian footballer

Personal information
- Date of birth: 25 September 1888
- Date of death: 1 October 1920 (aged 32)

International career
| Years | Team | Apps | (Gls) |
| 1909–1913 | Belgium | 8 | (0) |

Prosper Braeckman (25 September 1888 – 1 October 1920) was a Belgian footballer. He played in eight matches for the Belgium national football team from 1909 to 1913.
