= Joseph Augustus =

Belgian footballer

Personal information
- Date of birth: 14 January 1898
- Date of death: 12 May 1975 (aged 77)
- Position: Midfielder

Senior career*
Years	Team	Apps	(Gls)
1910–1912	Club Sportif Anversois		
1912–1928	FC Antwerp	124	(15)
1928-	Sint-Ignatius Antwerp		

International career
1921–1925	Belgium	5	(0)
- * Club domestic league appearances and goals

Joseph Augustus (14 January 1898 – 12 May 1975) was a Belgian footballer. He played in five matches for the Belgium national football team from 1921 to 1925.

His brothers Frans en Albert also played for FC Antwerp.
