= Adolf De Buck =

Belgian footballer

Personal information
- Date of birth: 1 December 1920
- Place of birth: Aalst, Belgium
- Date of death: 31 August 1984 (aged 63)
- Position: Defender

International career
Years	Team	Apps	(Gls)
1946–1948	Belgium	8	(0)

Adolf De Buck (1 December 1920 – 31 August 1984) was a Belgian footballer. He played in eight matches for the Belgium national football team from 1946 to 1948.
