= Joseph Pannaye =

Belgian footballer (1922–2009)

Personal information
- Date of birth: 29 July 1922
- Date of death: 20 February 2009 (aged 86)
- Position: Defender

Senior career*
Years	Team	Apps	(Gls)
1940–1955	Royal Tilleur FC		
1955–1961	R.C.S. Verviétois		

International career
1944–1947	Belgium	13	(0)
- * Club domestic league appearances and goals

Joseph Pannaye (29 July 1922 – 20 February 2009) was a Belgian footballer who played as a defender for Royal Tilleur FC and R.C.S. Verviétois. He made 13 appearances for the Belgium national team from 1944 to 1947.
