= Jozef Van Looy =

Belgian footballer

Personal information
- Date of birth: 2 March 1916
- Date of death: 19 March 1958 (aged 42)

International career
Years	Team	Apps	(Gls)
1950	Belgium	1	(0)

Jozef Van Looy (2 March 1916 – 19 March 1958) was a Belgian footballer. He played in one match for the Belgium national football team in 1950.
