= Robert Hustin =

Belgian footballer

Personal information
- Date of birth: 13 October 1886

International career
Years	Team	Apps	(Gls)
1905–1909	Belgium	10	(0)

Robert Hustin (born 13 October 1886, date of death unknown) was a Belgian footballer. He played in ten matches for the Belgium national football team from 1905 to 1909.
