= Cornelius Elst =

Belgian footballer

Personal information
- Date of birth: 25 January 1901
- Date of death: 2 November 1969 (aged 68)

International career
Years	Team	Apps	(Gls)
1922–1928	Belgium	5	(0)

Cornelius Elst (25 January 1901 – 2 November 1969) was a Belgian footballer. He played in five matches for the Belgium national football team from 1922 to 1928.
