= Gérard Delbeke =

Belgian footballer

Personal information
- Full name: Gerardus Antonius Arthur Maria Delbeke
- Date of birth: 1 August 1898
- Place of birth: Ruiselede, Belgium
- Date of death: 4 November 1984 (aged 86)
- Position: Midfielder

Senior career*
| Years | Team | Apps | (Gls) |
| 1923–1933 | FC Bruges | | |

International career
| 1930 | Belgium | 1 | (0) |

Managerial career
- 1933–1934: FC Bruges
- 1939–1945: FC Bruges
- * Club domestic league appearances and goals

Gérard Delbeke (1 August 1898 – 4 November 1984) was a Belgian footballer.

He was a midfielder for Club brugeois, spending eight seasons in the first team. He played one international match for Belgium, on 20 July 1930, during the first World Cup in Montevideo, against Paraguay (lost, 1–0).

In 1933, he retired, and took over as coach with the mission to return club brugeois to the élite. He succeeded in his mission, and continued to manage the Blauw-Zwart through the Second World War.

== Honours ==
- International in 1930 (1 cap during the 1930 World Cup)
