= Georges Hebdin =

Belgian footballer

Olympic medal record

Men's Football
Gold medal – first place	1920 Antwerp	Team competition

Georges Hebden (19 April 1889 – 23 March 1970) was a Belgian football (soccer) player who competed in the 1920 Summer Olympics. He was a member of the Belgium team, which won the gold medal in the football tournament. Georges played for R.U. Saint-Gilloise and appeared in 211 matches and scored 81 goals.
