= Oscar Bossaert =

Belgian footballer

Personal information
- Date of birth: 5 November 1887
- Place of birth: Brussels, Belgium
- Date of death: 1 February 1956 (aged 68)

International career
| Years | Team | Apps | (Gls) |
| 1911–1913 | Belgium | 12 | (0) |

Oscar Bossaert (5 November 1887 – 1 February 1956) was a Belgian footballer. He played twelve matches for the Belgium national football team from 1911 to 1913.
