= Henri Govard =

Belgian footballer (1922–1975)

Personal information
- Date of birth: 2 February 1922
- Date of death: 22 October 1975 (aged 53)
- Position: Forward

Senior career*
| Years | Team | Apps | (Gls) |
| 1945–1950 | FC Liège | | |
| 1950–1952 | Union SG | | |

International career
| 1948–1949 | Belgium | 6 | (4) |
- * Club domestic league appearances and goals

Henri Govard (2 February 1922 – 22 October 1975) was a Belgian footballer who played as a forward. He made six appearances for the Belgium national team from 1948 to 1949.
