= Charles Saeys =

Belgian footballer

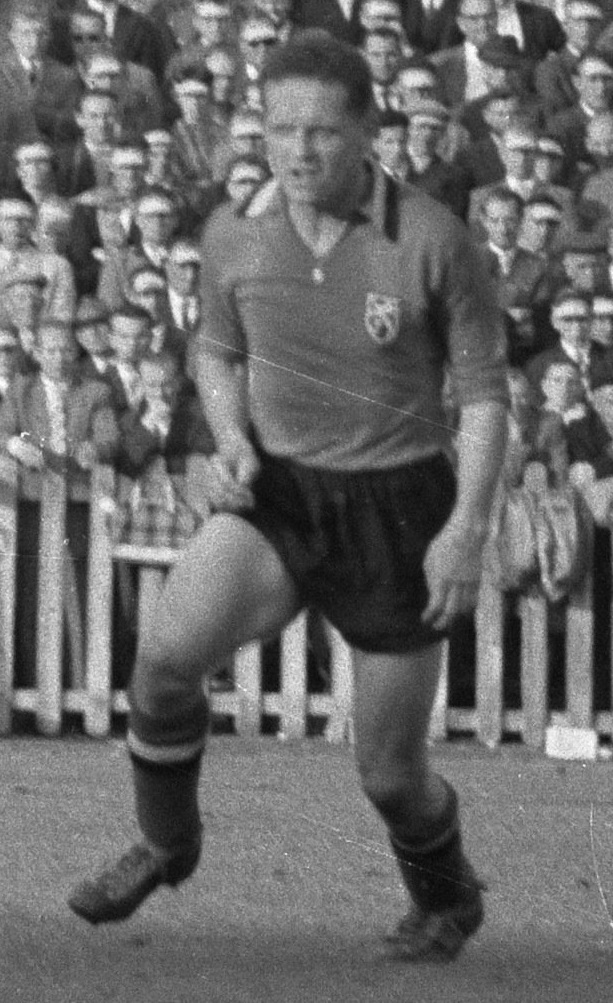
- Saeys in 1960

Personal information
- Date of birth: 15 November 1933 (age 92)

International career
Years	Team	Apps	(Gls)
1960	Belgium	5	(0)

Charles Saeys (born 15 November 1933) is a Belgian footballer. He played in five matches for the Belgium national football team in 1960.
