= August Van Steelant =

Belgian footballer

Personal information
- Date of birth: 8 April 1921
- Date of death: 24 October 1971 (aged 50)

International career
Years	Team	Apps	(Gls)
1948–1951	Belgium	8	(3)

August Van Steelant (8 April 1921 – 24 October 1971) was a Belgian footballer. He played in eight matches for the Belgium national football team from 1948 to 1951.
