= Hector Goetinck =

Belgian footballer and manager

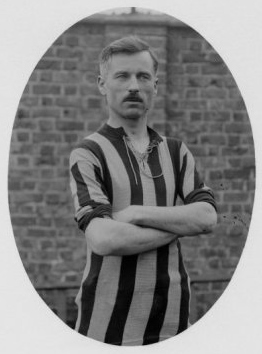

Personal information
- Date of birth: 5 March 1886
- Place of birth: Bruges, Belgium
- Date of death: 26 June 1943 (aged 57)
- Place of death: Knokke-Heist, Belgium
- Position: Midfielder

Senior career*
Years	Team	Apps	(Gls)
1903–1914	Club Brugge		
1919–1928	Club Brugge		

International career
1906–1923	Belgium	17	(2)

Managerial career
- 1930–1933: Club Brugge
- 1930–1934: Belgium
- 1937–1939: A.S. Oostende
- 1939–1940: Belgium
- * Club domestic league appearances and goals

Hector "Torten" Goetinck (5 March 1886 – 26 June 1943) was a Belgian football (soccer) player and manager. He coached the Belgium national football team in the 1930 FIFA World Cup and the 1934 FIFA World Cup, and also coached Club Brugge K.V. During his playing days he earned 17 caps for Belgium and also played for Club Brugge. He was born in Bruges, and died in Knokke-Heist during a World War II bombing raid.
