= 2012–13 in Belgian football =

Football in Belgium
- Season: 2012–13

Men's football
- Pro League: Anderlecht
- Second Division: Oostende
- Third Division A: Hoogstraten
- Third Division B: Virton
- Cup: Genk
- Super Cup: Anderlecht

The 2012–13 football season in Belgium, which is the 110th season of competitive football in the country and runs from July 2012 until June 2013.

== National team football ==
=== Men's national football team ===
With no less than four players winning individual awards as best player in their league following conclusion of the 2011–12 season, namely Eden Hazard (in France), Vincent Kompany (in England), Kevin Mirallas (in Greece) and Jan Vertonghen (in the Netherlands), questions were raised how it was possible that Belgium had not managed to qualify for the UEFA Euro 2012 tournament. Moreover, this raised the belief that Belgium would qualify for the 2014 FIFA World Cup, even with rather inexperienced head coach Marc Wilmots in charge after Georges Leekens quit in May 2012.

In a friendly before the actual qualifying campaign, the Red Devils managed to beat the Netherlands by a score of 4-2, with Dries Mertens the man of the match, scoring once and giving two assists. For once, a decent start was made, as Belgium won in Wales and kept Croatia to a 1-1 draw at home. The team continued on their good spirits, following up with a 0-3 win in Serbia, the biggest ever loss for the Serbian team, and a 2-0 win at home against Scotland. This left Belgium and Croatia together in the lead with 10 points out of 12 and with the other four teams trailing 6 or more points behind it already looked like they would be battling it out for first place. Also, by November Belgium moved into position 20 on the FIFA World Rankings, their highest position since 2004. Belgium finished the year 2012 with a 2-1 friendly loss in Romania.

In 2013, Belgium started with a 2-1 win against Slovakia, due to a last minute goal by Dries Mertens, before winning twice against Macedonia to keep their unbeaten status in the FIFA World Cup qualifying campaign. In June, while having risen to a record high 12th position in the FIFA World Rankings, Belgium first beat United States 2-4 in a friendly in Cleveland, before winning their final qualifying match at home against Serbia 2-1. At the same time, Croatia lost at home to Scotland, allowing Belgium to take a three-point lead.

==== 2014 FIFA World Cup qualification ====
7 September 2012	Wales	0 – 2	Belgium	Cardiff City Stadium, Cardiff
19:45 UTC+1		Report	Kompany 42'; Vertonghen 83'	Attendance: 20,156; Referee: Stefan Johannesson (Sweden)

11 September 2012	Belgium	1 – 1	Croatia	King Baudouin Stadium, Brussels
20:45 UTC+2	Gillet 45+1'	Report	Perišić 6'	Attendance: 39,987; Referee: Alberto Undiano Mallenco (Spain)

12 October 2012	Serbia	0 – 3	Belgium	Stadion Crvena Zvezda, Belgrade
20:30 UTC+2		Report	Benteke 34'; De Bruyne 68'; Mirallas 90+1'	Attendance: 21,650; Referee: Pavel Královec (Czech Republic)

16 October 2012	Belgium	2 – 0	Scotland	King Baudouin Stadium, Brussels
20:45 UTC+2	Benteke 68'; Kompany 71'	Report		Attendance: 44,132; Referee: Tom Harald Hagen (Norway)

22 March 2013	Macedonia	0 – 2	Belgium	Philip II Arena, Skopje
20:45 UTC+1		Report	De Bruyne 26'; Hazard 62' (pen.)	Attendance: 15,947; Referee: Deniz Aytekin (Germany)

26 March 2013	Belgium	1 – 0	Macedonia	King Baudouin Stadium, Brussels
20:45 UTC+1	Hazard 62'	Report		Attendance: 44,230; Referee: Olegário Benquerença (Portugal)

7 June 2013	Belgium	2 – 1	Serbia	King Baudouin Stadium, Brussels
20:45 UTC+2	De Bruyne 13'; Fellaini 60'	Report	Kolarov 87'	Attendance: 45,844; Referee: Stéphane Lannoy (France)

==== Friendlies ====
15 August 2012	Belgium	4 – 2	Netherlands	King Baudouin Stadium, Brussels
20:45 CEST	Benteke 20'; Mertens 75'; Lukaku 77'; Vertonghen 80'	Report	Narsingh 54'; Huntelaar 55'	Attendance: 46,000; Referee: Marijo Strahonja (Croatia)

14 November 2012	Romania	2 – 1	Belgium	Arena Națională, Bucharest
20:00 CET	Maxim 32'; Torje 66' (pen.)	Report	Benteke 23'	Referee: Mauro Bergonzi (Italia)

6 February 2013	Belgium	2 – 1	Slovakia	Jan Breydel Stadium, Bruges
20:45 CET	Hazard 10' (pen.); Mertens 90'	Report	Lásik 87'	Referee: Alon Yefet (Israel)

30 May 2013	United States	2 – 4	Belgium	FirstEnergy Stadium, Cleveland
2:11 CET	Cameron 24'; Dempsey 80' (pen.)	Report	Mirallas 8'; Benteke 57', 71'; Fellaini 65'	Attendance: 27,720; Referee: Jeffrey Solís (Costa Rica)

== Promotion and relegation ==
Team promoted to 2012–13 Belgian Pro League

- Belgian Second Division Champions: Charleroi
- Playoff winners: Waasland-Beveren

Teams relegated from 2011–12 Belgian Pro League

- 15th Place: Westerlo (lost playoff)
- 16th Place: Sint-Truiden

Teams promoted to 2012–13 Belgian Second Division

- Belgian Third Division A Champions: Mouscron-Péruwelz
- Belgian Third Division B Champions: Dessel Sport
- Playoff winners: Oudenaarde

Teams relegated from 2011-12 Belgian Second Division

- 16th Place, lost playoff: Tienen
- 17th Place: Dender EH
- 18th Place: Wetteren

== League competitions ==
=== Belgian Third Division ===
==== Belgian Third Division A ====
Pos	Team	Pld	W	D	L	GF	GA	GD	Pts
1	Hoogstraten VV (P)	34	22	8	4	73	31	+42	74
2	KRC Mechelen (E)	34	18	10	6	55	37	+18	64
3	Verbroedering Geel-Meerhout (E, P)	34	17	10	7	65	37	+28	61
4	K. Rupel Boom FC	34	16	8	10	56	45	+11	56
5	K. Berchem Sport 2004	34	15	7	12	50	46	+4	52
6	R. Cappellen FC	34	14	9	11	57	38	+19	51
6	Torhout 1992 KM	34	14	9	11	42	37	+5	51
8	KFC Vigor Wuitens Hamme	34	12	12	10	49	44	+5	48
9	KVV Coxyde	34	12	10	12	54	42	+12	46
10	KSV Bornem	34	11	12	11	51	53	−2	45
11	KSV Temse	34	11	10	13	39	51	−12	43
12	K. Standaard Wetteren	34	10	12	12	46	56	−10	42
13	KMSK Deinze (E)	34	10	9	15	51	60	−9	39
13	K. Olsa Brakel	34	10	9	15	44	56	−12	39
15	KV Turnhout	34	9	7	18	53	66	−13	34
15	KFC Izegem	34	9	7	18	49	67	−18	34
17	KSK Ronse (R)	34	8	7	19	47	73	−26	31
18	K. Racing Waregem (R)	34	8	4	22	42	84	−42	28

(E) Entered promotion playoff; (P) Promoted; (R) Relegated

==== Belgian Third Division B ====
Pos	Team	Pld	W	D	L	GF	GA	GD	Pts
1	R. Excelsior Virton (P)	36	23	10	3	76	28	+48	79
2	K. Bocholter VV (E)	36	22	8	6	73	37	+36	74
3	K. Patro Eisden Maasmechelen (E)	36	18	13	5	63	36	+27	67
4	UR La Louvière Centre	36	18	9	9	70	34	+36	63
5	RFC Huy	36	14	10	12	51	43	+8	52
5	KSC Grimbergen	36	14	10	12	58	53	+5	52
7	RFC Union La Calamine	36	14	9	13	61	52	+9	51
7	Heppignies-Lambusart-Fleurus	36	14	9	13	50	51	−1	51
9	FCV Dender EH	36	13	12	11	57	47	+10	51
9	KVK Tienen (R)	36	13	12	11	50	44	+6	51
11	RU Wallonne Ciney	36	14	8	14	52	58	−6	50
12	KV Woluwe-Zaventem (E)	36	13	8	15	52	57	−5	47
13	K. Diegem Sport	36	12	9	15	58	56	+2	45
14	RFC Tournai	36	12	7	17	46	51	−5	43
15	R. Géants Athois	36	11	10	15	54	59	−5	43
16	RCS Verviétois	36	9	14	13	42	54	−12	41
17	R. Union Saint-Gilloise	36	9	11	16	46	53	−7	38
18	R. Entente Bertrigeoise (R)	36	6	8	22	37	77	−40	26
19	FC Bleid-Gaume (R)	36	3	1	32	12	128	−116	10

(E) Entered promotion playoff; (P) Promoted; (R) Relegated

==== Third division play-off ====
All teams marked E entered a promotion playoff.

Only Verbroedering Geel-Meerhout succeeded in being promoted to the 2013–14 Belgian Second Division.

== European Club results ==
Champions Anderlecht and runners-up Club Brugge start in the qualifying rounds of the Champions League, while league numbers three and four, Genk and Gent play in the Europa League together with cup winners Lokeren.

Date	Team	Competition	Round	Leg	Opponent	Location	Score	Belgian Team Goalscorers
19 July 2012	Gent	Europa League	Qual. Round 2	Leg 1, Away	(Luxembourg) Differdange	Stade du Thillenberg, Differdange	0-1	Arzo
26 July 2012	Gent	Europa League	Qual. Round 2	Leg 2, Home	(Luxembourg) Differdange	Jules Ottenstadion, Ghent	3-2	Melli, Conté, Kola
1 August 2012	Anderlecht	Champions League	Qual. Round 3	Leg 1, Home	(Lithuania) Ekranas	Constant Vanden Stock Stadium, Anderlecht	5-0	De Sutter, Kanu, Mbokani (2), Jovanović
1 August 2012	Club Brugge	Champions League	Qual. Round 3	Leg 1, Away	(Denmark) Copenhagen	Parken Stadium, Copenhagen	0-0	
2 August 2012	Genk	Europa League	Qual. Round 3	Leg 1, Home	(Kazakhstan) Aktobe	Cristal Arena, Genk	2-1	Vossen, Joseph-Monrose
2 August 2012	Gent	Europa League	Qual. Round 3	Leg 1, Away	(Hungary) Videoton	Sóstói Stadion, Székesfehérvár	1-0	
8 August 2012	Anderlecht	Champions League	Qual. Round 3	Leg 2, Away	(Lithuania) Ekranas	Aukštaitija Stadium, Panevėžys	0-6	Kljestan, Praet, Iakovenko, De Sutter, Molins, Canesin
8 August 2012	Club Brugge	Champions League	Qual. Round 3	Leg 2, Home	(Denmark) Copenhagen	Jan Breydel Stadium, Bruges	2-3	Figueras, Odjidja
9 August 2012	Genk	Europa League	Qual. Round 3	Leg 2, Away	(Kazakhstan) Aktobe	Aktobe Central Stadium, Aktobe	1-2	Benteke, Buffel
9 August 2012	Gent	Europa League	Qual. Round 3	Leg 2, Home	(Hungary) Videoton	Jules Ottenstadion, Ghent	0-3	
21/22 August 2012	Anderlecht	Champions League	Play-off Round	Leg 1, Away	(Cyprus) AEL Limassol	Tsirion Stadium, Limassol	2-1	Mbokani
23 August 2012	Club Brugge	Europa League	Play-off Round	Leg 1, Away	(Hungary) Debrecen	Stadion Oláh Gábor Út, Debrecen	0-3	Blondel, Refaelov, Bacca
23 August 2012	Genk	Europa League	Play-off Round	Leg 1, Away	(Switzerland) Luzern	Swissporarena, Lucerne	2-1	Vossen
23 August 2012	Lokeren	Europa League	Play-off Round	Leg 1, Home	(Czech Republic) Viktoria Plzeň	King Baudouin Stadium, Brussels	2-1	Harbaoui, Mij. Marić
28 August 2012	Anderlecht	Champions League	Play-off Round	Leg 2, Home	(Cyprus) AEL Limassol	Constant Vanden Stock Stadium, Anderlecht	2-0	Mbokani, Iakovenko
30 August 2012	Club Brugge	Europa League	Play-off Round	Leg 2, Home	(Hungary) Debrecen	Jan Breydel Stadium, Bruges	4-1	Larsen, Vázquez, Tchité, Bacca
30 August 2012	Genk	Europa League	Play-off Round	Leg 2, Home	(Switzerland) Luzern	Cristal Arena, Genk	2-0	Fernández, Masika
30 August 2012	Lokeren	Europa League	Play-off Round	Leg 2, Away	(Czech Republic) Viktoria Plzeň	Stadion města Plzně, Plzeň	1-0	
18 September 2012	Anderlecht	Champions League	Group Stage	Matchday 1, Away	(Italy) AC Milan	San Siro, Milan	0-0	
20 September 2012	Club Brugge	Europa League	Group Stage	Matchday 1, Away	(France) Bordeaux	Stade Chaban-Delmas, Bordeaux	4-0	
20 September 2012	Genk	Europa League	Group Stage	Matchday 1, Home	(Hungary) Videoton	Cristal Arena, Genk	3-0	Vossen, Buffel, De Ceulaer
3 October 2012	Anderlecht	Champions League	Group Stage	Matchday 2, Home	(Spain) Málaga	Constant Vanden Stock Stadium, Anderlecht	0-3	
4 October 2012	Club Brugge	Europa League	Group Stage	Matchday 2, Home	(Portugal) Marítimo	Jan Breydel Stadium, Bruges	2-0	Bacca, Vleminckx
4 October 2012	Genk	Europa League	Group Stage	Matchday 2, Away	(Switzerland) Basel	St. Jakob-Park, Basel	2-2	De Ceulaer, Vossen
24 October 2012	Anderlecht	Champions League	Group Stage	Matchday 3, Away	(Russia) Zenit Saint Petersburg	Petrovsky Stadium, Saint Petersburg	0-1	
25 October 2012	Club Brugge	Europa League	Group Stage	Matchday 3, Away	(England) Newcastle United	St James' Park, Newcastle	0-1	
25 October 2012	Genk	Europa League	Group Stage	Matchday 3, Home	(Portugal) Sporting CP	Cristal Arena, Genk	2-0	De Ceulaer, Barda
6 November 2012	Anderlecht	Champions League	Group Stage	Matchday 4, Home	(Russia) Zenit Saint Petersburg	Constant Vanden Stock Stadium, Anderlecht	1-0	Mbokani
8 November 2012	Club Brugge	Europa League	Group Stage	Matchday 4, Home	(England) Newcastle United	Jan Breydel Stadium, Bruges	2-2	Tričkovski, Jørgensen
8 November 2012	Genk	Europa League	Group Stage	Matchday 4, Away	(Portugal) Sporting CP	Estádio José Alvalade, Lisbon	1-1	Plet
21 November 2012	Anderlecht	Champions League	Group Stage	Matchday 5, Home	(Italy) AC Milan	Constant Vanden Stock Stadium, Anderlecht	1-3	De Sutter
22 November 2012	Club Brugge	Europa League	Group Stage	Matchday 5, Home	(France) Bordeaux	Jan Breydel Stadium, Bruges	1-2	Lestienne
22 November 2012	Genk	Europa League	Group Stage	Matchday 5, Away	(Hungary) Videoton	Sóstói Stadion, Székesfehérvár	1-0	Barda
4 December 2012	Anderlecht	Champions League	Group Stage	Matchday 6, Away	(Spain) Málaga	La Rosaleda Stadium, Málaga	2-2	Jovanović, Mbokani
6 December 2012	Club Brugge	Europa League	Group Stage	Matchday 6, Away	(Portugal) Marítimo	Estádio dos Barreiros, Funchal	2-1	Refaelov
6 December 2012	Genk	Europa League	Group Stage	Matchday 6, Home	(Switzerland) Basel	Cristal Arena, Genk	0-0	
14 February 2013	Genk	Europa League	Round of 32	Leg 1, Away	(Germany) Stuttgart	Mercedes-Benz Arena, Stuttgart	1-1	Plet
21 February 2013	Genk	Europa League	Round of 32	Leg 2, Home	(Germany) Stuttgart	Cristal Arena, Genk	0-2	

== Other honours ==
Competition	Winner
Cup	Genk
Supercup	Anderlecht
Third division A	Hoogstraten
Third division B	Virton
Promotion A	Gent-Zeehaven
Promotion B	Londerzeel
Promotion C	Oosterzonen Oosterwijk
Promotion D	Sprimont-Comblain

== European qualification for 2013-14 summary ==
Competition	Qualifiers	Reason for Qualification
UEFA Champions League Group Stage	Anderlecht	1st in Jupiler League
UEFA Champions League Third Qualifying Round for Non-Champions	Zulte Waregem	2nd in Jupiler League
UEFA Europa League Play-off Round	Genk	Cup winner
UEFA Europa League Third Qualifying Round	Club Brugge	3rd in Jupiler League
UEFA Europa League Second Qualifying Round	Standard Liège	Europa League Playoff winner

== See also ==
- 2012–13 Belgian Pro League
- 2012–13 Belgian Cup
- 2012 Belgian Super Cup
- Belgian Second Division
- Belgian Third Division: divisions A and B
- Belgian Promotion: divisions A, B, C and D
