= 2010–11 in Belgian football =

Football in Belgium
- Season: 2010–11

The 2010–11 football season in Belgium, which is the 108th season of competitive football in the country and runs from August 2010 until July 2011.

== National team ==
=== UEFA Euro 2012 qualification ===
3 September 2010	Belgium	0 – 1	Germany	King Baudouin Stadium, Brussels
20:45 CET		Report	Klose 51'	Referee: Terje Hauge (Norway)

7 September 2010	Turkey	3 – 2	Belgium	Şükrü Saracoğlu Stadium, Istanbul
20:00 CET	Altıntop 48'; Şentürk 66'; Turan 78'	Report	Van Buyten 28', 69'	Referee: Damir Skomina (Slovenia)

8 October 2010	Kazakhstan	0 – 2	Belgium	Astana Arena, Astana
17:00 CET		Report	Ogunjimi 52', 70'	Referee: Marcin Borski (Poland)

12 October 2010	Belgium	4 – 4	Austria	King Baudouin Stadium, Brussels
20:45 CET	Vossen 11'; Fellaini 47'; Ogunjimi 87'; Lombaerts 89'	Report	Schiemer 14', 62'; Arnautović 29'; Harnik 90+3'	Referee: Mike Dean (England)

25 March 2011	Austria	0 – 2	Belgium	Ernst-Happel-Stadion, Vienna
20:30 CET		Report	Witsel 6', 50'	Referee: Vladislav Bezborodov (Russia)

29 March 2011	Belgium	4 – 1	Azerbaijan	King Baudouin Stadium, Brussels
	Vertonghen 12'; Simons 32' (pen.); Chadli 45'; Vossen 74'	Report	Abishov 16'	Referee: Daniel Stalhammar, (Sweden)

3 June 2011	Belgium	1 – 1	Turkey	King Baudouin Stadium, Brussels
20:45 CET	Ogunjimi 4'	Report	Burak 22'	Attendance: 40,000; Referee: Nicola Rizzoli (Italy)

=== Friendlies ===
11 August 2010	Finland	1 – 0	Belgium	Veritas Stadion, Turku
	Kompany 13' (o.g.)	Report

17 November 2010	Russia	0 – 2	Belgium	Tsentralnyi Profsoyuz Stadion, Voronezh
			Lukaku 2', 72'

9 February 2011	Belgium	1 – 1	Finland	Jules Ottenstadion, Ghent
	Witsel 61'		Porokara 90+3'	Referee: Cyril Zimmerman (Switzerland)

== Promotion and relegation ==
Team promoted to 2010–11 Belgian First Division

- Belgian Second Division Champions: Lierse

Teams relegated from 2009–10 Belgian First Division

- 15th Place: Roeselare (lost playoff)
- 16th Place: Mouscron (Mouscron was declared bankrupt during the season and relegated to third division.)

Teams promoted to 2010-11 Belgian Second Division

- Belgian Third Division A Champions: Heist
- Belgian Third Division B Champions: Visé
- Playoff winners: Rupel Boom

Teams relegated from 2009 to 2010 Belgian Second Division

- 19th Place: RFC Liège
- Playoff losers: Ronse
- Did not obtain a license: Beveren

Teams promoted to 2010-11 Belgian Third Division

- Belgian Promotion A Champions: Izegem
- Belgian Promotion B Champions: Bornem
- Belgian Promotion C Champions: Geel
- Belgian Promotion D Champions: Bertrix
- Playoff winners: Olsa Brakel
- Playoff winners: Heppignies
- Playoff winners: Grimbergen
- Playoff winners: Huy

Teams relegated from 2009 to 2010 Belgian Third Division

- 17th Place in Third Division A: Ieper
- 18th Place in Third Division A: Racing Mechelen
- 19th Place in Third Division A: Willebroek-Meerhof
- 17th Place in Third Division B: Veldwezelt
- 18th Place in Third Division B: Péruwelz
- Playoff losers: Zottegem
- Playoff losers: Tongeren

== League competitions ==
=== Belgian Third Division ===
==== Belgian Third Division A ====
Pos	Team	Pld	W	D	L	GF	GA	GD	Pts	Promotion or relegation
1	Aalst (C, P)	34	23	5	6	71	29	+42	74	Belgian Second Division
2	Hoogstraten	34	18	8	8	73	39	+34	62	Belgian Third Division Final Round
3	Deinze	34	17	8	9	63	54	+9	59	
4	Coxyde	34	17	7	10	70	54	+16	58	
5	Dessel	34	16	9	9	56	38	+18	57	
6	Oudenaarde	34	16	7	11	57	49	+8	55	
7	Sint-Niklaas	34	14	12	8	47	36	+11	54	Belgian Third Division Final Round
8	Geel-Meerhout	34	16	5	13	51	44	+7	53	Belgian Third Division Final Round
9	Ronse	34	12	9	13	42	39	+3	45	
10	Hamme	34	11	10	13	40	49	−9	43	
11	Temse	34	12	6	16	45	61	−16	42	
12	Torhout	34	10	12	12	43	57	−14	42	
13	Racing Waregem	34	11	5	18	31	50	−19	38	
14	Brakel	34	10	8	16	53	64	−11	38	
15	Bornem	34	9	10	15	44	48	−4	37	
16	Cappellen	34	8	11	15	45	51	−6	35	Relegation to Belgian Fourth Division play-off
17	Izegem (R)	34	8	10	16	44	58	−14	34	Relegation to Belgian Fourth Division
18	Wielsbeke (R)	34	4	6	24	31	86	−55	18	Relegation to Belgian Fourth Division

Source: sport.be
Rules for classification: 1) points; 2) number of matches won; if teams are still tied a playoff is organised.
(C) Champions; (P) Promoted; (R) Relegated

==== Belgian Third Division B ====
Pos	Team	Pld	W	D	L	GF	GA	GD	Pts	Promotion or relegation
1	Woluwe (C, P)	34	23	6	5	69	20	+49	75	Belgian Second Division
2	Virton	34	20	7	7	64	32	+32	67	Belgian Third Division Final Round
3	Bertrix	34	18	8	8	58	44	+14	62	
4	Zaventem	34	17	11	6	53	42	+11	62	Belgian Third Division Final Round
5	Union Saint-Gilloise	34	17	10	7	60	33	+27	61	Belgian Third Division Final Round
6	Bocholt	34	18	6	10	52	27	+25	60	
7	URS Centre	34	17	7	10	57	42	+15	58	
8	Olympic Charleroi	34	15	10	9	57	37	+20	55	
9	Hasselt	34	13	11	10	55	33	+22	50	
10	Diegem	34	13	10	11	48	47	+1	49	
11	Heppignies	34	9	10	15	34	51	−17	37	
12	Huy	34	8	13	13	37	50	−13	37	
13	Verviers	34	9	6	19	32	55	−23	33	
14	Bleid	34	8	8	18	30	66	−36	32	
15	Grimbergen	34	7	8	19	36	54	−18	29	
16	Ternat	34	7	7	20	46	79	−33	28	Relegation to Belgian Fourth Division play-off
17	RFC Liège (R)	34	4	5	25	33	79	−46	17	Relegation to Belgian Fourth Division
18	UR Namur (R)	34	4	3	27	30	60	−30	15	Relegation to Belgian Fourth Division

Source: sport.be
Rules for classification: 1) points; 2) number of matches won; if teams are still tied a playoff is organised.
(C) Champions; (P) Promoted; (R) Relegated

==== Third division play-off ====
From the third division A, Deinze qualified as winner of the periods 2 (matches 11 to 22) and 3 (matches 23 to 34), Hoogstraten and Coxyde qualified as 2nd and 4th placed teams in the final table. The first period (matches 1 to 10) was won by the champion Aalst. However, as only the champion Aalst, as well as Hoogstraten, Sint-Niklaas and Geel-Meerhout had got their remunerated football license, required to be able to enter the play-offs, Coxyde and Deinze did not enter the play-offs.

From the third division B, Virton qualified as the winner of period 1, Bertrix qualified as the 3rd-placed team in the final table and Zaventem as the 4th-placed team. The champion Woluwe had won periods 2 and 3. However, Bertrix did not apply for the remunerated football license and was replaced for the play-offs by Union, the 5th-placed team in the final table.

From the second division, Turnhout qualified for the second round of the play-off as the 16th-placed team.

First round
A2	Hoogstraten	2	2	4
A7	Sint-Niklaas (aet)	2	3	5
B5	Saint-Gilloise	2	1	3
B4	Woluwe-Zaventem	1	4	5
B2	Virton	1	3	4
A8	Geel-Meerhout	2	0	2

Semifinals
2	Turnhout	1	3	4
A7	Sint-Niklaas (aet)	2	3	5
B4	Woluwe-Zaventem	1	3	4
B2	Virton	0	1	1

Final
A7	Sint-Niklaas	1	1	2
B4	Woluwe-Zaventem	1	0	1

=== Belgian Promotion ===
In the Promotion A, Athois were crowned champions, while Ieper, Péruwelz-Mouscron and Sparta Petegem respectively won the first period (matches 1 to 10), second period (matches 11 to 20) and third period (matches 21 to 30). In the Promotion B, RC Mechelen won the regular season as well as the second period. Lyra and Londerzeel won respectively the first and third periods. Wijgmaal also entered the Promotion play-off as 3rd-placed team in the final table. In the Promotion C, Maasmechelen won the title, as well as the first and third periods and Tielen won the second period. Veldwezelt and Oosterwijk also qualified for the play-off as respectively the 2nd and 3rd-placed teams in the regular season. In the Promotion D, La Calamine won the championship as well as periods 1 and 3 and Walhain won the period 2. Sprimont-Comblain and Faymonville joined Walhain as qualifier for the play-off from group D as respectively 3rd and 4th-placed teams. The two 16th-placed teams from the third division Cappellen and Ternat also qualified for the Promotion play-off, entering the competition in the second round.

First round
Péruwelz-Mouscron	4
Sprimont-Comblain	0
Petegem (aet)	1
Lyra	0
Oosterwijk	3
Tielen	1
Walhain	3
Veldwezelt	2
Wijgmaal	2
Faymonville	0
Ieper	5
Londerzeel	1

Quarter-finals
3B	Ternat	1
Péruwelz-Mouscron (aet)	2
Petegem	2
Oosterwijk	1
3A	Cappellen	1
Walhain	0
Wijgmaal	3
Ieper	1

Semifinals
Péruwelz-Mouscron	2
Petegem	0
3A	Cappellen	0
Wijgmaal	1

Third-place game
Petegem	1
3A	Cappellen	4

== European Club results ==
Note that the Belgian team's score is always given first.

- Anderlecht and Gent started the season in the qualifying rounds of the Champions League, respectively in the champions and non-champions path. Both were eliminated and dropped into the Europa League. Anderlecht suffered a major mental blow after losing out on penalties to Partizan Belgrade, whereas Gent was no match for Dynamo Kyiv. In the Europa League, Gent performed above expectations as they first knocked out Feyenoord and then came close to progress through the group stage, only losing to French league leaders Lille on the final day, earlier defeating Levski Sofia from Bulgaria and Portuguese club Sporting CP at home. After some mediocre results in the group stage, Anderlecht only scraped through on the last day as they beat Hajduk Split and Zenit St. Petersburg also won their match against AEK Athens. In the knockout round, Anderlecht was blown away 0-3 and 0–2 by Ajax, although their victory of the season before had given them high hopes before the match.
- Cercle Brugge, Genk and Club Brugge started respectively in the second qualifying round, third qualifying round and playoff round of the Europa League. Cercle Brugge beat Finnish team TPS Turku before narrowly losing out to Anorthosis Famagusta of Cyprus. Genk also beat a team from Turku, namely Inter Turku, after losing out to Porto. Club Brugge did reach the group stage by beating Dinamo Minsk, but then scored only three points in six matches after a very disappointing string of results against Villarreal, PAOK and Dinamo Zagreb.

Date	Team	Competition	Round	Leg	Opponent	Location	Score
15 July 2010	Cercle Brugge	Europa League	Qual. Round 2	Leg 1, Home	(Finland) TPS Turku	Jules Ottenstadion, Ghent	0-1
22 July 2010	Cercle Brugge	Europa League	Qual. Round 2	Leg 2, Away	(Finland) TPS Turku	Veritas Stadion, Turku	2-1
27 July 2010	Anderlecht	Champions League	Qual. Round 3	Leg 1, Away	(Wales) The New Saints	Racecourse Ground, Wrexham	3-1
27 July 2010	Gent	Champions League	Qual. Round 3	Leg 1, Away	(Ukraine) Dynamo Kyiv	Lobanovsky Dynamo Stadium, Kyiv	0-3
29 July 2010	Cercle Brugge	Europa League	Qual. Round 3	Leg 1, Home	(Cyprus) Anorthosis Famagusta	Jan Breydel Stadium, Bruges	1-0
29 July 2010	Genk	Europa League	Qual. Round 3	Leg 1, Away	(Finland) Inter Turku	Veritas Stadion, Turku	5-1
3 August 2010	Anderlecht	Champions League	Qual. Round 3	Leg 2, Home	(Wales) The New Saints	Constant Vanden Stock Stadium, Brussels	3-0
4 August 2010	Gent	Champions League	Qual. Round 3	Leg 2, Home	(Ukraine) Dynamo Kyiv	Jules Ottenstadion, Ghent	1-3
5 August 2010	Cercle Brugge	Europa League	Qual. Round 3	Leg 2, Away	(Cyprus) Anorthosis Famagusta	Antonis Papadopoulos Stadium, Larnaca	1-3
5 August 2010	Genk	Europa League	Qual. Round 3	Leg 2, Home	(Finland) Inter Turku	Cristal Arena, Genk	3-2
18 August 2010	Anderlecht	Champions League	Playoff Round	Leg 1, Away	(Serbia) Partizan Belgrade	Stadion FK Partizan, Belgrade	2-2
19 August 2010	Club Brugge	Europa League	Playoff Round	Leg 1, Home	(Belarus) Dinamo Minsk	Jan Breydel Stadium, Bruges	2-1
19 August 2010	Genk	Europa League	Playoff Round	Leg 1, Home	(Portugal) Porto	Cristal Arena, Genk	0-3
19 August 2010	Gent	Europa League	Playoff Round	Leg 1, Away	(Netherlands) Feyenoord	Feijenoord Stadion, Rotterdam	0-1
24 August 2010	Anderlecht	Champions League	Playoff Round	Leg 2, Home	(Serbia) Partizan Belgrade	Constant Vanden Stock Stadium, Brussels	2-2 (aet) (2–3 p)
26 August 2010	Club Brugge	Europa League	Playoff Round	Leg 2, Away	(Belarus) Dinamo Minsk	Dinamo Stadium, Minsk	3-2
26 August 2010	Genk	Europa League	Playoff Round	Leg 2, Away	(Portugal) Porto	Estádio do Dragão, Porto	2-4
26 August 2010	Gent	Europa League	Playoff Round	Leg 2, Home	(Netherlands) Feyenoord	Jules Ottenstadion, Ghent	2-0
16 September 2010	Anderlecht	Europa League	Group Stage	Matchday 1, Home	(Russia) Zenit St. Petersburg	Constant Vanden Stock Stadium, Brussels	1-3
16 September 2010	Club Brugge	Europa League	Group Stage	Matchday 1, Home	(Greece) PAOK	Jan Breydel Stadium, Bruges	1-1
16 September 2010	Gent	Europa League	Group Stage	Matchday 1, Away	(Bulgaria) Levski Sofia	Georgi Asparuhov Stadium, Sofia	2-3
30 September 2010	Anderlecht	Europa League	Group Stage	Matchday 2, Away	(Croatia) Hajduk Split	Stadion Poljud, Split	0-1
30 September 2010	Club Brugge	Europa League	Group Stage	Matchday 2, Away	(Spain) Villarreal	Estadio El Madrigal, Villarreal	1-2
30 September 2010	Gent	Europa League	Group Stage	Matchday 2, Home	(France) Lille	Jules Ottenstadion, Ghent	1-1
21 October 2010	Anderlecht	Europa League	Group Stage	Matchday 3, Home	(Greece) AEK Athens	Constant Vanden Stock Stadium, Brussels	3-0
21 October 2010	Club Brugge	Europa League	Group Stage	Matchday 3, Away	(Croatia) Dinamo Zagreb	Stadion Maksimir, Zagreb	0-0
21 October 2010	Gent	Europa League	Group Stage	Matchday 3, Away	(Portugal) Sporting	Estádio José Alvalade, Lisbon	1-5
4 November 2010	Anderlecht	Europa League	Group Stage	Matchday 4, Away	(Greece) AEK Athens	Karaiskakis Stadium, Piraeus	1-1
4 November 2010	Club Brugge	Europa League	Group Stage	Matchday 4, Home	(Croatia) Dinamo Zagreb	Jan Breydel Stadium, Bruges	0-2
4 November 2010	Gent	Europa League	Group Stage	Matchday 4, Home	(Portugal) Sporting	Jules Ottenstadion, Ghent	3-1
1 December 2010	Gent	Europa League	Group Stage	Matchday 5, Home	(Bulgaria) Levski Sofia	Jules Ottenstadion, Ghent	1-0
2 December 2010	Anderlecht	Europa League	Group Stage	Matchday 5, Away	(Russia) Zenit St. Petersburg	Petrovsky Stadium, Saint Petersburg	1-3
2 December 2010	Club Brugge	Europa League	Group Stage	Matchday 5, Away	(Greece) PAOK	Toumba Stadium, Thessaloniki	1-1
15 December 2010	Club Brugge	Europa League	Group Stage	Matchday 6, Home	(Spain) Villarreal	Jan Breydel Stadium, Bruges	1-2
16 December 2010	Anderlecht	Europa League	Group Stage	Matchday 6, Home	(Croatia) Hajduk Split	Constant Vanden Stock Stadium, Brussels	2-0
16 December 2010	Gent	Europa League	Group Stage	Matchday 6, Away	(France) Lille	Stadium Nord Lille Métropole, Villeneuve-d'Ascq	0-3
17 February 2011	Anderlecht	Europa League	Round of 32	Leg 1, Home	(Netherlands) Ajax	Constant Vanden Stock Stadium, Brussels	0-3
24 February 2011	Anderlecht	Europa League	Round of 32	Leg 2, Away	(Netherlands) Ajax	Amsterdam Arena, Amsterdam	0-2

== Other honours ==
Competition	Winner
Cup	Standard Liège
Supercup	Genk
Third division A	Eendracht Aalst
Third division B	White Star Woluwe
Promotion A	Ath
Promotion B	Racing Mechelen
Promotion C	Patro Maasmechelen
Promotion D	Kelmis

== European qualification for 2011-12 summary ==
Competition	Qualifiers	Reason for Qualification
UEFA Champions League Third Qualifying Round for Champions	Genk	1st in Jupiler League
UEFA Champions League Third Qualifying Round for Non-Champions	Standard Liège	2nd in Jupiler League
UEFA Europa League Play-off Round	Anderlecht	3rd in Jupiler League
UEFA Europa League Third Qualifying Round	Club Brugge	4th in Jupiler League
UEFA Europa League Second Qualifying Round	Westerlo	Cup losing finalist

== See also ==
- 2010–11 Belgian First Division
- 2010–11 Belgian Cup
- 2011 Belgian Super Cup
- Belgian Second Division
- Belgian Third Division: divisions A and B
- Belgian Promotion: divisions A, B, C and D
