= 2015–16 in Belgian football =

Football in Belgium
- Season: 2015–16

Men's football
- Pro League: Club Brugge
- Second Division: WS Bruxelles
- Third Division A: Beerschot Wilrijk
- Third Division B: Hamme
- Cup: Standard Liège
- Super Cup: Gent

The following article is a summary of the 2015–16 football season in Belgium, which is the 113th season of competitive football in the country and runs from July 2015 until June 2016.

== Promotion and relegation ==
=== Pre-season ===
League	Promoted to league	Relegated from league
Pro League	Sint-Truiden; OH Leuven	Cercle Brugge; Lierse
Second Division	Koksijde; Union SG; Deinze	Mons; RC Mechelen; Woluwe-Zaventem; Eendracht Aalst
Third Division	Sparta Petegem; Tempo Overijse; Beerschot Wilrijk; RFC Liège; Sint-Niklaas; Hamoir; Deux-Acren	Ath; Visé; Zele; Verviers; Tournai; Turnhout

== National teams ==
=== Belgium national football team ===
==== UEFA Euro 2016 qualifying ====
Pos	Team	Pld	W	D	L	GF	GA	GD	Pts	Qualification	(Belgium)	(Wales)	(Bosnia and Herzegovina)	(Israel)	(Cyprus)	(Andorra)
1	Belgium	10	7	2	1	24	5	+19	23	Qualify for final tournament	—	0–0	3–1	3–1	5–0	6–0
2	Wales	10	6	3	1	11	4	+7	21	Qualify for final tournament	1–0	—	0–0	0–0	2–1	2–0
3	Bosnia and Herzegovina	10	5	2	3	17	12	+5	17	Advance to play-offs	1–1	2–0	—	3–1	1–2	3–0
4	Israel	10	4	1	5	16	14	+2	13		0–1	0–3	3–0	—	1–2	4–0
5	Cyprus	10	4	0	6	16	17	−1	12		0–1	0–1	2–3	1–2	—	5–0
6	Andorra	10	0	0	10	4	36	−32	0		1–4	1–2	0–3	1–4	1–3	—

Source: UEFA
Rules for classification: Qualification tiebreakers

12 June 2015 Euro 2016 qualifying	Wales	1–0	Belgium	Cardiff City Stadium, Cardiff
20:45 (19:45 UTC+1)	Bale 25'	Report		Attendance: 33,280; Referee: Felix Brych (Germany)

3 September 2015 Euro 2016 qualifying	Belgium	3–1	Bosnia and Herzegovina	King Baudouin Stadium, Brussels
20:45 (20:45 UTC+2)	Fellaini 23'; De Bruyne 44'; Hazard 78' (pen.)	Report	Džeko 15'	Attendance: 42,975; Referee: Jorge Sousa (Portugal)

6 September 2015 Euro 2016 qualifying	Cyprus	0–1	Belgium	GSP Stadium, Nicosia
20:45 (21:45 UTC+3)		Report	Hazard 86'	Attendance: 11,866; Referee: Vladislav Bezborodov (Russia)

10 October 2015 Euro 2016 qualifying	Andorra	1–4	Belgium	Estadi Nacional, Andorra la Vella
20:45 (20:45 UTC+2)	Lima 51' (pen.)	Report	Nainggolan 19'; De Bruyne 42'; Hazard 56' (pen.); Depoitre 64'	Attendance: 3,032; Referee: Paweł Gil (Poland)

13 October 2015 Euro 2016 qualifying	Belgium	3–1	Israel	King Baudouin Stadium, Brussels
20:45 (20:45 UTC+2)	Mertens 64'; De Bruyne 78'; Hazard 84'	Report	Hemed 88'	Attendance: 39,773; Referee: Anastasios Sidiropoulos (Greece)

==== UEFA Euro 2016 ====
13 June 2016
21:00

Belgium	Match 10	Italy
	Report

Parc Olympique Lyonnais, Lyon
18 June 2016
15:00

Belgium	Match 22	Republic of Ireland
	Report

Nouveau Stade de Bordeaux, Bordeaux
22 June 2016
21:00

Sweden	Match 36	Belgium
	Report

Allianz Riviera, Nice

==== Friendlies ====
7 June 2015 Friendly	France	3–4	Belgium	Saint-Denis, France
21:00	Valbuena 53' (pen.); Fekir 89'; Payet 90+1'	Report	Fellaini 17', 42'; Nainggolan 50'; E. Hazard 54' (pen.)	Stadium: Stade de France; Attendance: 70,000; Referee: Marijo Strahonja (Croatia)

13 November 2015 Friendly	Belgium	3–1	Italy	Brussels, Belgium
20:45 (20:45 UTC+1)	Vertonghen 13'; De Bruyne 74'; Batshuayi 82'	Report	Candreva 3'	Stadium: King Baudouin Stadium; Attendance: 40,000; Referee: Szymon Marciniak (Poland)

17 November 2015 Friendly	Belgium	cancelled	Spain	Brussels, Belgium
20:45 (20:45 UTC+1)				Stadium: King Baudouin Stadium

29 March 2016 Friendly	Portugal	2–1	Belgium	Leiria, Portugal
20:45 (UTC+2)	Nani 20'; Ronaldo 40'	Report	R. Lukaku 62'	Stadium: Estádio Dr. Magalhães Pessoa; Attendance: 21,157; Referee: Stephan Klossner (Switzerland)

28 May 2016 Friendly	Switzerland	1–2	Belgium	Genève, Switzerland
16:15 (UTC+2)	Džemaili 31'; Seferovic (red card) 81'		Lukaku 34'; De Bruyne 83'	Stadium: Stade de Genève; Attendance: 20,000; Referee: Paolo Mazzoleni (Italy)

1 June 2016 Friendly	Belgium	Finland	Brussels, Belgium
20:45 (UTC+2)			Stadium: King Baudouin Stadium

5 June 2016 Friendly	Belgium	Norway	Brussels, Belgium
18:00 (UTC+2)			Stadium: King Baudouin Stadium

1. The friendly against Spain was canceled the night before it was planned to take place, due to the terror threat following the November 2015 Paris attacks.
2. The friendly against Portugal on 27 March in Brussels was almost cancelled as well following the 2016 Brussels bombings on 22 March, however it was instead moved to Leiria, Portugal.

=== Belgium women's national football team ===
==== 2017 UEFA Women's European Championship qualification ====
===== Group 7 =====
Pos	Team	Pld	W	D	L	GF	GA	GD	Pts	Qualification	England	Belgium	Serbia	Bosnia and Herzegovina	Estonia
1	England	8	7	1	0	32	1	+31	22	Final tournament	—	1–1	7–0	1–0	5–0
2	Belgium	8	5	2	1	27	5	+22	17	Final tournament	0–2	—	1–1	6–0	6–0
3	Serbia	8	3	1	4	10	21	−11	10		0–7	1–3	—	0–1	3–0
4	Bosnia and Herzegovina	8	3	0	5	8	17	−9	9		0–1	0–5	2–4	—	4–0
5	Estonia	8	0	0	8	0	33	−33	0		0–8	0–5	0–1	0–1	—

Source: UEFA

==== Algarve Cup ====
2 March 2016	Iceland	2–1	Belgium	Lagos Municipal Stadium, Lagos
15:00	Jónsdóttir 5'; Brynjarsdóttir 90+2'	Report	Cayman 42'	Referee: Ledya Tafesse (Ethiopia)

4 March 2016	Canada	1–0	Belgium	VRS António Sports Complex, Vila Real de Santo António
15:00	Clarke 87'	Report		Referee: Sandra Braz (Portugal)

7 March 2016	Denmark	1–2	Belgium	Albufeira Municipal Stadium, Albufeira
18:30	Sandvej 90+3'	Report	Sørensen 43' (o.g.); Cayman 86'	Referee: Aye Thein (Myanmar)

9 March 2016	Belgium	5–0	Russia	VRS António Sports Complex, Vila Real de Santo António
14:00	Wullaert 18'; Cayman 42', 73'; Schryvers 51'; Coutereels 61' (pen.)	Report		Referee: Marianela Araya Cruz (Costa Rica)

==== Friendly ====
16 September 2015 Friendly	Belgium	5–0	Poland	Tubize, Belgium
14:30	Siwińska 2' (o.g.); Van Gorp 37', 64'; De Caigny 42'; Jaques 79'	Report		Stadium: Belgian Football Center; Referee: Virginie Derouaux (Belgium)

== League competitions ==
=== Belgian First Division ===
==== Regular season ====
Pos	Team	Pld	W	D	L	GF	GA	GD	Pts	Qualification or relegation
1	Club Brugge	30	21	1	8	64	30	+34	64	Qualification for the Championship play-offs
2	Gent	30	17	9	4	56	29	+27	60	Qualification for the Championship play-offs
3	Anderlecht	30	15	10	5	51	29	+22	55	Qualification for the Championship play-offs
4	Oostende	30	14	7	9	55	44	+11	49	Qualification for the Championship play-offs
5	Genk	30	14	6	10	42	30	+12	48	Qualification for the Championship play-offs
6	Zulte Waregem	30	12	7	11	51	50	+1	43	Qualification for the Championship play-offs
7	Standard Liège	30	12	5	13	41	51	−10	41	Qualification for the Europa League play-offs
8	Charleroi	30	10	9	11	36	39	−3	39	Qualification for the Europa League play-offs
9	Kortrijk	30	10	9	11	31	35	−4	39	Qualification for the Europa League play-offs
10	Mechelen	30	10	7	13	48	50	−2	37	Qualification for the Europa League play-offs
11	Lokeren	30	8	10	12	35	40	−5	34	Qualification for the Europa League play-offs
12	Waasland-Beveren	30	9	6	15	40	57	−17	33	Qualification for the Europa League play-offs
13	Sint-Truiden	30	8	6	16	28	47	−19	30	Qualification for the Europa League play-offs
14	Mouscron-Péruwelz	30	7	9	14	39	51	−12	30	Qualification for the Europa League play-offs
15	Westerlo	30	7	9	14	35	59	−24	30	
16	OH Leuven (R)	30	7	8	15	42	53	−11	29	Relegation to First Division B

Source: Belgian Pro League, Soccerway
Rules for classification: 1) Points; 2) Matches won; 3) Goal difference; 4) Goals scored; 5) Away goals scored; 6) Away matches won; 7) Play-off.
(R) Relegated

==== Championship play-offs ====
Pos	Team	Pld	W	D	L	GF	GA	GD	Pts	Qualification	CLU	AND	GNT	GNK	OOS	ZWA
1	Club Brugge (C)	10	7	1	2	25	9	+16	54	Qualification for the Champions League group stage	—	4–0	2–0	3–1	2–2	5–0
2	Anderlecht	10	6	1	3	15	16	−1	47	Qualification for the Champions League third qualifying round	1–0	—	2–0	1–0	2–1	2–0
3	Gent	10	3	3	4	10	15	−5	42	Qualification for the Europa League third qualifying round	1–4	1–1	—	0–0	2–0	1–1
4	Genk (O)	10	5	1	4	20	13	+7	40	Qualification for the play-off final	4–2	5–2	1–2	—	4–0	2–0
5	Oostende	10	3	2	5	14	19	−5	36		0–1	4–2	0–1	2–1	—	3–3
6	Zulte Waregem	10	1	2	7	11	23	−12	27		0–2	1–2	4–2	1–2	1–2	—

Source: Belgian Pro League, Soccerway
Rules for classification: 1) Points; 2) Points without (possible) half points added due to rounding; 3) Matches won; 4) Goal difference; 5) Goals scored; 6) Away goals scored; 7) Away matches won; 8) Play-off.
(C) Champions; (O) Play-off winners

=== Belgian Second Division ===
Due to a reform in the Belgian football league, the Belgian Second Division ceases to exist and is replaced by the Belgian First Division B from the 2016–17 season which will only contain 8 teams instead of the current 17. As a result, the bottom nine teams in the league are set to relegate to the newly created league at the third level of the Belgian football pyramid, the Belgian First Amateur Division. Due to the fact that WS Brussels did not receive a licence, they were relegated instead of Roeselare.

Pos	Team	Pld	W	D	L	GF	GA	GD	Pts	Promotion or relegation
1	RWS Brussels (C, R, D)	32	19	6	7	53	28	+25	63	Relegation to the 2016–17 Belgian First Amateur Division (Note: WS Brussels was refused a Belgian professional football license and is thus not allowed to play in the 2016-17 Belgian First Division A or Division B and is instead relegated to the 2016–17 Belgian First Amateur Division. As a result, runner-up Eupen was promoted instead and ninth placed Roeselare avoided relegation.)
2	Eupen (P)	32	18	8	6	69	34	+35	62	Promotion to the 2016–17 Belgian First Division A
3	Antwerp	32	18	8	6	52	20	+32	62	Qualification to the 2016–17 Belgian First Division B
4	Tubize	32	17	6	9	51	34	+17	57	Qualification to the 2016–17 Belgian First Division B
5	Cercle Brugge	32	14	12	6	56	35	+21	54	Qualification to the 2016–17 Belgian First Division B
6	Union SG	32	15	6	11	50	34	+16	51	Qualification to the 2016–17 Belgian First Division B
7	Lierse	32	14	9	9	53	41	+12	51	Qualification to the 2016–17 Belgian First Division B
8	Lommel	32	14	8	10	43	29	+14	50	Qualification to the 2016–17 Belgian First Division B
9	Roeselare	32	14	8	10	46	47	−1	50	Qualification to the 2016–17 Belgian First Division B
10	Dessel (R)	32	14	6	12	38	40	−2	48	Relegation to the 2016–17 Belgian First Amateur Division
11	Seraing (R)	32	13	5	14	45	50	−5	44	Relegation to the 2016–17 Belgian First Amateur Division
12	Virton (R)	32	8	10	14	40	55	−15	34	Relegation to the 2016–17 Belgian First Amateur Division
13	ASV Geel (R)	32	6	13	13	40	56	−16	31	Relegation to the 2016–17 Belgian First Amateur Division
14	Deinze (R)	32	6	11	15	36	58	−22	29	Relegation to the 2016–17 Belgian First Amateur Division
15	Patro Eisden Maasmechelen (R)	32	5	9	18	33	63	−30	24	Relegation to the 2016–17 Belgian First Amateur Division
16	Heist (R)	32	4	7	21	39	82	−43	19	Relegation to the 2016–17 Belgian First Amateur Division
17	Coxyde (R)	32	2	10	20	29	67	−38	16	Relegation to the 2016–17 Belgian First Amateur Division

Rules for classification: 1) points; 2) goal difference; 3) number of goals scored.
(C) Champions; (D) Disqualified; (P) Promoted; (R) Relegated

=== Belgian Third Division ===
Due to a reform in the Belgian football league, the Belgian Third Division ceases to exist and is replaced by the Belgian Second Amateur Division from the 2016–17 season, now at the fourth level of Belgian football. A newly created league, the Belgian First Amateur Division is formed at the third level, effectively pushing the teams in this division one level down the pyramid. Only the top two teams in each division and the two promotion playoff winners are "promoted" to the new league, meaning they will remain at the third level, while most of the teams effectively drop to the fourth level. The two teams finishing in last position in each group are relegated to the Belgian Third Amateur Division, which in fact means a drop from level 3 to level 5 of the pyramid.

==== Group A ====
Pos	Team	Pld	W	D	L	GF	GA	GD	Pts	Qualification or relegation
1	Hamme (C, P)	34	21	5	8	66	31	+35	68	Qualification to the 2016–17 Belgian First Amateur Division
2	Sint-Eloois-Winkel (Note: Sint-Eloois-Winkel did not apply for a Belgian remunerated football license and is thus not allowed to play in the 2016-17 Belgian First Amateur Division. As a result, third placed Oudenaarde was promoted instead.)	34	16	13	5	56	43	+13	61	Relegation to the 2016–17 Belgian Second Amateur Division
3	Oudenaarde (Note: Normally, the teams finishing in positions 3 to 6 were set to participate in the promotion playoffs (together with the teams finishing in the same positions in Group B) for the three remaining places in the 2016-17 Belgian First Amateur Division. Due to the fact that Sint-Eloois-Winkel, Sparta Petegem and Temse did not apply for a license and Oudenaarde was promoted, the playoff was contested by the four teams finishing highest in the league that did receive a licence, allowing Eendracht Aalst and La Louvière Centre to take part as well.) (P)	34	17	9	8	70	45	+25	60	Qualification to the 2016–17 Belgian First Amateur Division
4	FCV Dender EH (P)	34	16	11	7	69	43	+26	59	Qualification to the Promotion play-offs
5	Londerzeel	34	17	8	9	58	37	+21	59	Qualification to the Promotion play-offs
6	Sparta Petegem	34	16	8	10	66	54	+12	56	Relegation to the 2016–17 Belgian Second Amateur Division
7	Eendracht Aalst	34	15	9	10	66	55	+11	54	Qualification to the Promotion play-offs
8	Temse	34	15	8	11	60	48	+12	53	Relegation to the 2016–17 Belgian Second Amateur Division
9	La Louvière Centre	34	14	8	12	54	44	+10	50	Qualification to the Promotion play-offs
10	Olsa Brakel	34	11	13	10	56	46	+10	46	Relegation to the 2016–17 Belgian Second Amateur Division
11	Gullegem	34	10	15	9	50	45	+5	45	Relegation to the 2016–17 Belgian Second Amateur Division
12	Gent-Zeehaven	34	11	10	13	50	56	−6	43	Relegation to the 2016–17 Belgian Second Amateur Division
13	Sint-Niklase	34	11	9	14	51	57	−6	42	Relegation to the 2016–17 Belgian Second Amateur Division
12	Bornem	34	9	11	14	54	56	−2	38	Relegation to the 2016–17 Belgian Second Amateur Division
15	Izegem	34	7	7	20	51	73	−22	28	Relegation to the 2016–17 Belgian Second Amateur Division
16	Torhout	34	8	4	22	29	75	−46	28	Relegation to the 2016–17 Belgian Second Amateur Division
17	Acrenoise	34	5	9	20	37	86	−49	24	Relegation to the 2016–17 Belgian Second Amateur Division
18	Racing Mechelen	34	5	7	22	33	82	−49	22	Relegation to the 2016–17 Belgian Third Amateur Division

Updated to match(es) played on 1 May 2016. Source: Group A at Soccerway
Rules for classification: 1) points; 2) goal difference; 3) number of goals scored.
(C) Champions; (P) Promoted

==== Group B ====
Pos	Team	Pld	W	D	L	GF	GA	GD	Pts	Qualification or relegation
1	Beerschot Wilrijk (C, P)	36	21	8	7	64	39	+25	71	Qualification to the 2016–17 Belgian First Amateur Division
2	Oosterzonen Oosterwijk (P)	36	19	14	3	68	38	+30	71	Qualification to the 2016–17 Belgian First Amateur Division
3	Bocholter	36	19	7	10	52	41	+11	64	Qualification to the Promotion play-offs
4	Hasselt (P)	36	18	6	12	63	41	+22	60	Qualification to the Promotion play-offs
5	Wallonne Ciney (Note: Ciney did not apply for a Belgian remunerated football license and is thus not allowed to play in the 2016-17 Belgian First Amateur Division. As a result, seventh placed Liège was allowed to participate in the promotion playoffs for the three remaining places in the 2016-17 Belgian First Amateur Division.)	36	17	6	13	57	42	+15	57	Relegation to the 2016–17 Belgian Second Amateur Division
6	Sprimont-Comblain (P)	36	16	8	12	56	43	+13	56	Qualification to the Promotion play-offs
7	Liège	36	15	8	13	58	56	+2	53	Qualification to the Promotion play-offs
8	Hamoir	36	15	7	14	70	74	−4	52	Relegation to the 2016–17 Belgian Second Amateur Division
9	Rupel Boom	36	15	6	15	65	55	+10	51	Relegation to the 2016–17 Belgian Second Amateur Division
10	Berchem Sport	36	14	8	14	51	55	−4	50	Relegation to the 2016–17 Belgian Second Amateur Division
11	Cappellen	36	14	7	15	51	56	−5	49	Relegation to the 2016–17 Belgian Second Amateur Division
12	Hoogstraten	36	13	9	14	60	60	0	48	Relegation to the 2016–17 Belgian Second Amateur Division
13	Walhain	36	12	11	13	48	57	−9	47	Relegation to the 2016–17 Belgian Second Amateur Division
14	Tempo Overijse	36	12	9	15	47	56	−9	45	Relegation to the 2016–17 Belgian Second Amateur Division
15	Union La Calamine	36	12	4	20	44	59	−15	40	Relegation to the 2016–17 Belgian Second Amateur Division
16	Tienen-Hageland	36	10	10	16	52	56	−4	40	Relegation to the 2016–17 Belgian Second Amateur Division
17	Grimbergen	36	9	7	20	38	55	−17	34	Relegation to the 2016–17 Belgian Second Amateur Division
18	Woluwe-Zaventem	36	9	6	21	34	61	−27	33	Relegation to the 2016–17 Belgian Second Amateur Division
19	Diegem Sport	36	8	7	21	33	67	−34	31	Relegation to the 2016–17 Belgian Third Amateur Division

Updated to match(es) played on 1 May 2016. Source: Group B at Soccerway
Rules for classification: 1) points; 2) goal difference; 3) number of goals scored.
(C) Champions; (P) Promoted

==== Promotion play-offs ====
The eight teams taking part in the promotion play-offs are playing to win one of the three remaining places in the 2016-17 Belgian First Amateur Division. The final match between the winners of Round 2, Sprimont-Comblain and FCV Dender EH, was not played as both teams already achieved promotion by winning Round 2. Hasselt beat La Louvière Centre in the third place match and took the final promotion spot. The five losing teams will play in the 2016-17 Belgian Second Amateur Division, effectively one level lower than in the 2015–16 season.

Round 1
Bocholter	1	1	2
Sprimont-Comblain	2	3	4
Liège	1	0	1
Hasselt	1	0	1 (a)
Londerzeel	1	1	2
FCV Dender EH	2	0	2 (a)
La Louvière Centre	1	5	6
Eendracht Aalst	3	0	3

Round 2
Sprimont-Comblain	3	3	6
Hasselt	0	0	0
FCV Dender EH	2	1	3
La Louvière Centre	0	1	1

Round 3
Third place
La Louvière Centre	2	0	2
Hasselt	3	4	7

== European Club results ==
Champions Gent qualified directly for the group stage of the Champions League, while runners-up Club Brugge started in the qualifying rounds. As third-place finisher, Anderlecht qualified directly for the group stage of the Europa League, while Standard Liège and Charleroi started in the qualifying rounds.

Date	Team	Competition	Round	Leg	Opponent	Location	Score	Belgian Team Goalscorers
16 July 2015	Charleroi	Europa League	Qual. Round 2	Leg 1, Home	(Israel) Beitar Jerusalem	Stade du Pays de Charleroi, Charleroi	5-1	Pollet (2), Kebano (2), Stevance
23 July 2015	Charleroi	Europa League	Qual. Round 2	Leg 2, Away	(Israel) Beitar Jerusalem	Teddy Stadium, Jerusalem	1-4	Kebano, Sağlık, Ndongala, Stevance
28 July 2015	Club Brugge	Champions League	Qual. Round 3	Leg 1, Away	(Greece) Panathinaikos	Leoforos Alexandras Stadium, Athens	2-1	Bolingoli-Mbombo
30 July 2015	Charleroi	Europa League	Qual. Round 3	Leg 1, Home	(Ukraine) Zorya Luhansk	Stade du Pays de Charleroi, Charleroi	0-2	
30 July 2015	Standard Liège	Europa League	Qual. Round 3	Leg 1, Home	(Bosnia and Herzegovina) Željezničar	Stade Maurice Dufrasne, Liège	2-1	Kosorić (o.g.), Knockaert
5 August 2015	Club Brugge	Champions League	Qual. Round 3	Leg 2, Home	(Greece) Panathinaikos	Jan Breydel Stadium, Bruges	3-0	Cools, Vázquez, Oularé
6 August 2015	Charleroi	Europa League	Qual. Round 3	Leg 2, Away	(Ukraine) Zorya Luhansk	Valeriy Lobanovskyi Dynamo Stadium, Kyiv	3-0	
6 August 2015	Standard Liège	Europa League	Qual. Round 3	Leg 2, Away	(Bosnia and Herzegovina) Željezničar	Asim Ferhatović Hase Stadium, Sarajevo	0-1	Van Damme
18 August 2015	Club Brugge	Champions League	Play-off round	Leg 1, Away	(England) Manchester United	Old Trafford, Manchester	3-1	Carrick (o.g.)
20 August 2015	Standard Liège	Europa League	Play-off round	Leg 1, Away	(Norway) Molde	Aker Stadion, Molde	2-0	
26 August 2015	Club Brugge	Champions League	Play-off round	Leg 2, Home	(England) Manchester United	Jan Breydel Stadium, Bruges	0-4	
27 August 2015	Standard Liège	Europa League	Play-off round	Leg 2, Home	(Norway) Molde	Stade Maurice Dufrasne, Liège	3-1	Knockaert, Santini, Trebel
16 September 2015	Gent	Champions League	Group Stage	Matchday 1, Home	(France) Lyon	Ghelamco Arena, Ghent	1-1	Milićević
17 September 2015	Anderlecht	Europa League	Group Stage	Matchday 1, Home	(France) Monaco	Constant Vanden Stock Stadium, Anderlecht	1-1	Gillet
17 September 2015	Club Brugge	Europa League	Group Stage	Matchday 1, Away	(Italy) Napoli	Stadio San Paolo, Naples	5-0	
29 September 2015	Gent	Champions League	Group Stage	Matchday 2, Away	(Russia) Zenit Saint Petersburg	Petrovsky Stadium, Saint Petersburg	2-1	Matton
1 October 2015	Anderlecht	Europa League	Group Stage	Matchday 2, Away	(Azerbaijan) Qarabağ	Tofiq Bahramov Stadium, Baku	1-0	
1 October 2015	Club Brugge	Europa League	Group Stage	Matchday 2, Home	(Denmark) Midtjylland	Jan Breydel Stadium, Bruges	1-3	Meunier
20 October 2015	Gent	Champions League	Group Stage	Matchday 3, Away	(Spain) Valencia	Mestalla Stadium, Valencia	2-1	Foket
22 October 2015	Anderlecht	Europa League	Group Stage	Matchday 3, Home	(England) Tottenham Hotspur	Constant Vanden Stock Stadium, Anderlecht	2-1	Gillet, Okaka
22 October 2015	Club Brugge	Europa League	Group Stage	Matchday 3, Away	(Poland) Legia Warsaw	Polish Army Stadium, Warsaw	1-1	De fauw
4 November 2015	Gent	Champions League	Group Stage	Matchday 4, Home	(Spain) Valencia	Ghelamco Arena, Ghent	1-0	Kums (p)
5 November 2015	Anderlecht	Europa League	Group Stage	Matchday 4, Away	(England) Tottenham Hotspur	White Hart Lane, Tottenham	2-1	Ezekiel
5 November 2015	Club Brugge	Europa League	Group Stage	Matchday 4, Home	(Poland) Legia Warsaw	Jan Breydel Stadium, Bruges	1-0	Meunier
24 November 2015	Gent	Champions League	Group Stage	Matchday 5, Away	(France) Lyon	Stade de Gerland, Lyon	1-2	Milićević, Coulibaly
26 November 2015	Anderlecht	Europa League	Group Stage	Matchday 5, Away	(France) Monaco	Stade Louis II, Monaco	0-2	Gillet, Acheampong
26 November 2015	Club Brugge	Europa League	Group Stage	Matchday 5, Home	(Italy) Napoli	Jan Breydel Stadium, Bruges	0-1	
9 December 2015	Gent	Champions League	Group Stage	Matchday 6, Home	(Russia) Zenit Saint Petersburg	Ghelamco Arena, Ghent	2-1	Depoitre, Milićević
10 December 2015	Anderlecht	Europa League	Group Stage	Matchday 6, Home	(Azerbaijan) Qarabağ	Constant Vanden Stock Stadium, Anderlecht	2-1	Najar, Okaka
10 December 2015	Club Brugge	Europa League	Group Stage	Matchday 6, Away	(Denmark) Midtjylland	MCH Arena, Herning	1-1	Vossen
17 February 2016	Gent	Champions League	Round of 16	Leg 1, Home	(Germany) Wolfsburg	Ghelamco Arena, Ghent	2-3	Kums, Coulibaly
18 February 2016	Anderlecht	Europa League	Round of 32	Leg 1, Home	(Greece) Olympiacos	Constant Vanden Stock Stadium, Anderlecht	1-0	Mbodji
25 February 2016	Anderlecht	Europa League	Round of 32	Leg 2, Away	(Greece) Olympiacos	Karaiskakis Stadium, Piraeus	1-2	Acheampong (2)
8 March 2016	Gent	Champions League	Round of 16	Leg 2, Away	(Germany) Wolfsburg	Volkswagen Arena, Wolfsburg	1-0	
10 March 2016	Anderlecht	Europa League	Round of 16	Leg 1, Away	(Ukraine) Shakhtar Donetsk	Arena Lviv, Lviv	3-1	Acheampong
17 March 2016	Anderlecht	Europa League	Round of 16	Leg 2, Home	(Ukraine) Shakhtar Donetsk	Constant Vanden Stock Stadium, Anderlecht	0-1	

1. Zorya Luhansk played their home match at Valeriy Lobanovskyi Dynamo Stadium, Kyiv, instead of their regular stadium Avanhard Stadium, Luhansk, due to the war conditions in Eastern Ukraine.
2. Željezničar played their home matches at Asim Ferhatović Hase Stadium, Sarajevo, instead of their regular stadium Stadion Grbavica, Sarajevo.
3. Shakhtar Donetsk played their home match at Arena Lviv, Lviv instead of their regular stadium, Donbas Arena in Donetsk, due to the war in Donbas.

== Other honours ==
Competition	Winner
Cup	Standard Liège
Supercup	Gent
Third division A	Hamme
Third division B	Beerschot Wilrijk
Promotion A	Knokke
Promotion B	Olympic Charleroi
Promotion C	Hades
Promotion D	Meux

== European qualification for 2016–17 summary ==
Competition	Qualifiers	Reason for Qualification
UEFA Champions League Group Stage	Club Brugge	1st in Jupiler Pro League
UEFA Champions League Third Qualifying Round for Non-Champions	Anderlecht	2nd in Jupiler Pro League
UEFA Europa League Group Stage	Standard Liège	Cup winner
UEFA Europa League Third Qualifying Round	Gent	3rd in Jupiler Pro League
UEFA Europa League Second Qualifying Round	Genk	Europa League Playoff winner

== See also ==
- 2015–16 Belgian Pro League
- 2015–16 Belgian Cup
- 2015 Belgian Super Cup
- Belgian Second Division
- Belgian Third Division: divisions A and B
- Belgian Promotion: divisions A, B, C and D
