= 2013–14 in Belgian football =

Football in Belgium
- Season: 2013–14

Men's football
- Pro League: Anderlecht
- Second Division: Westerlo
- Third Division A: Racing Mechelen
- Third Division B: Woluwe Zaventem
- Cup: Lokeren
- Super Cup: Anderlecht

The 2013–14 football season in Belgium, which is the 111th season of competitive football in the country and runs from July 2013 until June 2014.

== National team football ==
=== Men's national football team ===
The Red Devils started their season with an entertaining goalless friendly against France in the month of August.

==== 2014 FIFA World Cup qualification ====
6 September 2013	Scotland	0-2	Belgium	Hampden Park, Glasgow
20:00 UTC+1		Report	Defour 34'; Miralles 89'	Attendance: 40,284; Referee: Paolo Tagliavento (Italy)

11 October 2013	Croatia	v	Belgium	Stadion Maksimir, Zagreb

15 October 2013	Belgium	v	Wales	King Baudouin Stadium, Brussels

==== Friendlies ====
14 August 2013	Belgium	0 – 0	France	King Baudouin Stadium, Brussels
				Attendance: 45,000; Referee: Craig Thomson (Scotland)

== Promotion and relegation ==
Team promoted to 2013–14 Belgian Pro League

- Belgian Second Division Champions: Oostende

Teams relegated from 2012–13 Belgian Pro League

- 15th Place: Beerschot

Teams promoted to 2013–14 Belgian Second Division

- Belgian Third Division A Champions: Hoogstraten
- Belgian Third Division B Champions: Virton
- Playoff winners: ASV Geel

Teams relegated from 2012-13 Belgian Second Division

- 17th Place: Oudenaarde
- 18th Place: Sint-Niklaas

== European Club results ==
Champions Anderlecht qualified directly for the group stage of the Champions League, while runners-up Zulte Waregem started in the qualifying rounds. League numbers three and four, Club Brugge and Standard Liège started in the qualifying rounds of the Europa League, together with cup winners Genk.

Date	Team	Competition	Round	Leg	Opponent	Location	Score	Belgian Team Goalscorers
19 July 2013	Standard Liège	Europa League	Qual. Round 2	Leg 1, Away	(Iceland) KR	KR-völlur, Reykjavík	1-3	Kanu, Batshuayi, M'Poku
25 July 2013	Standard Liège	Europa League	Qual. Round 2	Leg 2, Home	(Iceland) KR	Stade Maurice Dufrasne, Liège	3-1	Bulot, Ezekiel (2)
30 July 2013	Zulte Waregem	Champions League	Qual. Round 3	Leg 1, Away	(Netherlands) PSV Eindhoven	Philips Stadion, Eindhoven	2-0	
1 August 2013	Club Brugge	Europa League	Qual. Round 3	Leg 1, Away	(Poland) Śląsk Wrocław	Stadion Miejski, Wrocław	1-0	
1 August 2013	Standard Liège	Europa League	Qual. Round 3	Leg 1, Away	(Greece) Skoda Xanthi	Skoda Xanthi Arena, Xanthi	1-2	Mujangi Bia, Ciman
7 August 2013	Zulte Waregem	Champions League	Qual. Round 3	Leg 2, Home	(Netherlands) PSV Eindhoven	Constant Vanden Stock Stadium, Anderlecht	0-3	
8 August 2013	Club Brugge	Europa League	Qual. Round 3	Leg 2, Home	(Poland) Śląsk Wrocław	Jan Breydel Stadium, Bruges	3-3	Refaelov, Duarte, De Sutter
8 August 2013	Standard Liège	Europa League	Qual. Round 3	Leg 2, Home	(Greece) Skoda Xanthi	Stade Maurice Dufrasne, Liège	2-1	Bulot, De Camargo
22 August 2013	Genk	Europa League	Play-off Round	Leg 1, Away	(Iceland) FH	Kaplakriki, Hafnarfjörður	0-2	Vossen, Tillen (o.g.)
22 August 2013	Standard Liège	Europa League	Play-off Round	Leg 1, Away	(Belarus) Minsk	Dynama Stadium, Minsk	0-2	Batshuayi, Bulot
22 August 2013	Zulte Waregem	Europa League	Play-off Round	Leg 1, Home	(Cyprus) APOEL	Constant Vanden Stock Stadium, Anderlecht	1-1	Malanda
29 August 2013	Genk	Europa League	Play-off Round	Leg 2, Home	(Iceland) FH	Cristal Arena, Genk	5-2	Vossen, Mbodj, Limbombe, Camus (2)
29 August 2013	Standard Liège	Europa League	Play-off Round	Leg 2, Home	(Belarus) Minsk	Stade Maurice Dufrasne, Liège	3-1	M'Poku, De Camargo, Mujangi Bia
29 August 2013	Zulte Waregem	Europa League	Play-off Round	Leg 2, Away	(Cyprus) APOEL	GSP Stadium, Nicosia	1-2	Habibou, Naessens
17 September 2013	Anderlecht	Champions League	Group Stage	Matchday 1, Away	(Portugal) Benfica	Estádio da Luz, Lisbon	2-0	
19 September 2013	Genk	Europa League	Group Stage	Matchday 1, Away	(Ukraine) Dynamo Kyiv	Olimpiyskiy National Sports Complex, Kyiv	0-1	Gorius
19 September 2013	Standard Liège	Europa League	Group Stage	Matchday 1, Home	(Denmark) Esbjerg	Stade Maurice Dufrasne, Liège	1-2	Mujangi Bia
19 September 2013	Zulte Waregem	Europa League	Group Stage	Matchday 1, Home	(England) Wigan Athletic	Jan Breydel Stadium, Bruges	0-0	
2 October 2013	Anderlecht	Champions League	Group Stage	Matchday 2, Home	(Greece) Olympiacos	Constant Vanden Stock Stadium, Anderlecht	0-3	
3 October 2013	Genk	Europa League	Group Stage	Matchday 2, Home	(Switzerland) Thun	Cristal Arena, Genk	2-1	Gorius, Vossen
3 October 2013	Standard Liège	Europa League	Group Stage	Matchday 2, Away	(Sweden) Elfsborg	Borås Arena, Borås	1-1	Mujangi Bia
3 October 2013	Zulte Waregem	Europa League	Group Stage	Matchday 2, Away	(Russia) Rubin Kazan	Central Stadium, Kazan	4-0	
23 October 2013	Anderlecht	Champions League	Group Stage	Matchday 3, Home	(France) Paris Saint-Germain	Constant Vanden Stock Stadium, Anderlecht	0-5	
24 October 2013	Genk	Europa League	Group Stage	Matchday 3, Home	(Austria) Rapid Wien	Cristal Arena, Genk	1-1	Gorius
24 October 2013	Standard Liège	Europa League	Group Stage	Matchday 3, Away	(Austria) Salzburg	Red Bull Arena, Salzburg	2-1	Mujangi Bia
24 October 2013	Zulte Waregem	Europa League	Group Stage	Matchday 3, Home	(Slovenia) Maribor	Jan Breydel Stadium, Bruges	1-3	De Fauw
5 November 2013	Anderlecht	Champions League	Group Stage	Matchday 4, Away	(France) Paris Saint-Germain	Parc des Princes, Paris	1-1	De Zeeuw
7 November 2013	Genk	Europa League	Group Stage	Matchday 4, Away	(Austria) Rapid Wien	Gerhard Hanappi Stadium, Vienna	2-2	Mbodj, Buffel
7 November 2013	Standard Liège	Europa League	Group Stage	Matchday 4, Home	(Austria) Salzburg	Stade Maurice Dufrasne, Liège	1-3	M'Poku
7 November 2013	Zulte Waregem	Europa League	Group Stage	Matchday 4, Away	(Slovenia) Maribor	Ljudski vrt, Maribor	0-1	Hazard
27 November 2013	Anderlecht	Champions League	Group Stage	Matchday 5, Home	(Portugal) Benfica	Constant Vanden Stock Stadium, Anderlecht	2-3	Mbemba, Bruno
28 November 2013	Genk	Europa League	Group Stage	Matchday 5, Home	(Ukraine) Dynamo Kyiv	Cristal Arena, Genk	3-1	Vossen, Kumordzi, De Ceulaer
28 November 2013	Standard Liège	Europa League	Group Stage	Matchday 5, Away	(Denmark) Esbjerg	Blue Water Arena, Esbjerg	2-1	De Camargo
28 November 2013	Zulte Waregem	Europa League	Group Stage	Matchday 5, Away	(England) Wigan Athletic	DW Stadium, Wigan	1-2	Hazard, Malanda
10 December 2013	Anderlecht	Champions League	Group Stage	Matchday 6, Away	(Greece) Olympiacos	Karaiskakis Stadium, Piraeus	3-1	Kljestan
12 December 2013	Genk	Europa League	Group Stage	Matchday 6, Home	(Switzerland) Thun	Arena Thun, Thun	0-1	Vossen
12 December 2013	Standard Liège	Europa League	Group Stage	Matchday 6, Home	(Sweden) Elfsborg	Stade Maurice Dufrasne, Liège	1-3	Mbombo
12 December 2013	Zulte Waregem	Europa League	Group Stage	Matchday 6, Home	(Russia) Rubin Kazan	Jan Breydel Stadium, Bruges	0-2	
20 February 2014	Genk	Europa League	Round of 32	Leg 1, Away	(Russia) Anzhi Makhachkala	Saturn Stadium, Ramenskoye	0-0	
27 February 2014	Genk	Europa League	Round of 32	Leg 2, Home	(Russia) Anzhi Makhachkala	Cristal Arena, Genk	0-2	

== Other honours ==
Competition	Winner
Cup	Lokeren
Supercup	Anderlecht
Third division A	KRC Mechelen
Third division B	Woluwe-Zaventem
Promotion A	Gullegem
Promotion B	Eendracht Zele
Promotion C	Tienen
Promotion D	Walhain

== European qualification for 2014–15 summary ==
Competition	Qualifiers	Reason for Qualification
UEFA Champions League Group Stage		1st in Jupiler Pro League
UEFA Champions League Third Qualifying Round for Non-Champions		2nd in Jupiler Pro League
UEFA Europa League Play-off Round		Cup winner
UEFA Europa League Third Qualifying Round		3rd in Jupiler Pro League
UEFA Europa League Second Qualifying Round		Europa League Playoff winner

== See also ==
- 2013–14 Belgian Pro League
- 2013–14 Belgian Cup
- 2013 Belgian Super Cup
- Belgian Second Division
- Belgian Third Division: divisions A and B
- Belgian Promotion: divisions A, B, C and D
