= 2004–05 in Belgian football =

Football in Belgium
- Season: 2004–05

The 2004–05 season was the 102nd competitive season in Belgian football.

== Overview ==
The Brussels derby is played once again since FC Brussels promoted.

== National team ==
Belgium began their qualifying campaign for the Football World Cup 2006.

Date	Venue	Opponents	Score	Comp	Belgium scorers	Match Report
18 August 2004	Ullevaal Stadium, Oslo (A)	Norway	2–2	F	Thomas Buffel (2)	www.dhnet.be
4 September 2004	Stade du Pays de Charleroi, Charleroi (H)	Lithuania	1–1	WCQ	Wesley Sonck	www.sport.be
9 October 2004	El Sardinero, Santander (A)	Spain	0–2	WCQ		www.sport.be
17 November 2004	King Baudouin Stadium, Brussels (H)	Serbia and Montenegro	0–2	WCQ		www.sport.be
9 February 2005	Cairo (A)	Egypt	0–4	F		www.dhnet.be
26 March 2005	King Baudouin Stadium, Brussels (H)	Bosnia and Herzegovina	4–1	WCQ	Thomas Buffel, Emile Mpenza (2), Koen Daerden	www.sport.be
30 March 2005	Serravalle (A)	San Marino	2–1	WCQ	Daniel Van Buyten, Timmy Simons	www.sport.be
4 June 2005	Red Star Stadium, Beograd (A)	Serbia and Montenegro	0–0	WCQ		www.sport.be

Key

- H = Home match
- A = Away match
- F = Friendly
- WCQ = FIFA World Cup 2006 Qualifying, European Zone Group 7

== Honours ==
Competition	Winner
Belgian First Division	Club Brugge
Cup	Germinal Beerschot
Supercup	Club Brugge
Second division	Zulte-Waregem
Third division A	Mechelen
Third division B	Overpelt-Lommel

== Final tables ==
=== Belgian First Division ===
Pos	Team	Pld	W	D	L	GF	GA	GD	Pts	Qualification or relegation
1	Club Brugge (C)	34	24	7	3	83	25	+58	79	Qualification to Champions League third qualifying round
2	Anderlecht	34	23	7	4	75	34	+41	76	Qualification to Champions League second qualifying round
3	Genk	34	21	7	6	59	37	+22	70	Qualification to UEFA Cup second qualifying round
4	Standard Liège	34	21	7	6	64	30	+34	70	
5	Charleroi	34	19	7	8	47	34	+13	64	Qualification to Intertoto Cup second round
6	Gent	34	18	5	11	46	36	+10	59	Qualification to Intertoto Cup first round
7	La Louvière	34	12	8	14	43	43	0	44	
8	Sporting Lokeren	34	11	11	12	36	38	−2	44	Qualification to Intertoto Cup first round
9	Germinal Beerschot	34	12	6	16	36	45	−9	42	Qualification to UEFA Cup first round
10	Lierse	34	12	5	17	57	60	−3	41	
11	Cercle Brugge	34	12	5	17	45	74	−29	41	
12	Westerlo	34	11	6	17	34	54	−20	39	
13	Mouscron	34	10	6	18	40	43	−3	36	
14	Sint-Truiden	34	10	6	18	40	58	−18	36	
15	Molenbeek Brussels Strombeek	34	10	3	21	32	60	−28	33	
16	Beveren	34	8	8	18	43	59	−16	32	
17	Oostende (R)	34	6	9	19	31	62	−31	27	Relegation to 2005–06 Belgian Second Division
18	Mons (R)	34	7	5	22	39	58	−19	26	Relegation to 2005–06 Belgian Second Division

(C) Champions; (R) Relegated

=== Second division ===
Pos	Team	Pld	W	D	L	GF	GA	GD	Pts
1	Zulte-Waregem (C)	34	22	7	5	71	35	+36	73
2	Roeselare (P)	34	16	12	6	51	31	+20	60
3	Geel	34	16	8	10	49	36	+13	56
4	Antwerp	34	15	5	14	48	40	+8	50
5	Waasland	34	14	8	12	51	55	−4	50
6	Tubize	34	14	6	14	54	49	+5	48
7	Kortrijk	34	13	9	12	56	48	+8	48
8	Ronse	34	13	9	12	42	51	−9	48
9	Beringen-Heusden-Zolder	34	12	11	11	41	41	0	47
10	Deinze	34	11	10	13	47	59	−12	43
11	Hamme	34	10	11	13	50	47	+3	41
12	Virton	34	10	11	13	43	54	−11	41
13	Eupen	34	9	14	11	52	46	+6	41
14	Union	34	10	9	15	41	53	−12	39
15	Dessel	34	9	12	13	31	46	−15	39
16	Visé (R)	34	10	7	17	52	54	−2	37
17	Maasmechelen (R)	34	9	10	15	35	53	−18	37
18	Aalst (R)	34	7	13	14	41	57	−16	34

(C) Champions; (P) Promoted; (R) Relegated

=== Third division ===
==== Third division A ====
For their second season since the renewal of the club, Y.R. K.V. Mechelen gained the title this time in extremis before R. Cappellen F.C., who reaches the third division playoffs along with Torhout 1992 K.M. and F.C. Denderleeuw respectively winners of the first and second slices. The third slice went to Mechelen so it is Cappellen that replaces them in the playoffs. K.F.C. Evergem-Center and K. Lyra T.S.V. are relegated to promotion while K.S.K. Wevelgem City will fight in the Promotion playoffs.

Pos	Team	Pld	W	D	L	GF	GA	GD	Pts
1	KV Mechelen (C)	30	18	5	7	76	35	+41	59
2	Cappellen	30	17	7	6	58	29	+29	58
3	Torhout	30	17	3	10	69	44	+25	54
4	Denderhoutem	30	16	6	8	61	41	+20	54
5	Sint-Niklaas	30	15	9	6	60	37	+23	54
6	Maldegem	30	13	8	9	44	46	−2	47
7	Turnhout	30	12	11	7	51	40	+11	47
8	Wetteren	30	14	3	13	43	44	−1	45
9	Denderleeuw	30	12	8	10	51	46	+5	44
10	Sporting West	30	11	9	10	44	41	+3	42
11	Racing Waregem	30	11	6	13	54	61	−7	39
12	KRC Mechelen	30	8	10	12	43	42	+1	34
13	Bornem	30	6	9	15	48	75	−27	27
14	Wevelgem (R)	30	7	5	18	35	65	−30	26
15	Lyra (R)	30	5	7	18	41	76	−35	22
16	Evergem (R)	30	2	6	22	30	86	−56	12

(C) Champions; (R) Relegated

==== Third division B ====
United Overpelt-Lommel won this year's edition with a comfortable advance and also won the last two slices. Oud-Heverlee Leuven has won the first slice so the 3rd and 4th placed teams (respectively K.S.K. Tongeren and R. Sprimont Comblain Sport) enter the playoffs. At the bottom of the table, Seraing R.U.L. and Veldwezelt will play Promotion next season while U.R. Namur will have to undergo the playoffs.

Pos	Team	Pld	W	D	L	GF	GA	GD	Pts
1	Overpelt-Lommel (C)	30	24	6	0	77	22	+55	78
2	Oud-Heverlee Leuven (P)	30	19	5	6	63	27	+36	62
3	Tongeren	30	15	7	8	51	32	+19	52
4	Sprimont Comblain	30	13	10	7	46	43	+3	49
5	Walhain	30	14	3	13	52	52	0	45
6	Woluwé	30	12	8	10	44	38	+6	44
7	Bocholter	30	11	9	10	35	35	0	42
8	Tienen	30	10	9	11	34	35	−1	39
9	Charleroi-Marchienne	30	9	10	11	39	36	+3	37
10	Diegem	30	10	6	14	51	43	+8	36
11	La Calamine	30	9	8	13	38	59	−21	35
12	Kermt-Hasselt	30	7	11	12	42	51	−9	32
13	Francs Borains	30	8	6	16	23	47	−24	30
14	Namur	30	5	13	12	32	62	−30	28
15	Veldwezelt (R)	30	7	4	19	32	56	−24	25
15	Seraing (R)	30	3	13	14	33	54	−21	22

(C) Champions; (P) Promoted; (R) Relegated

== See also ==
- Belgian First Division 2004-05
- 2004 Belgian Super Cup
- Belgian Second Division
- Belgian Third Division: divisions A and B
- Belgian Promotion: divisions A, B, C and D
