= 2014–15 in Belgian football =

Football in Belgium
- Season: 2014–15

Men's football
- Super Cup: Anderlecht

The following article is a summary of the 2014–15 football season in Belgium, which is the 112th season of competitive football in the country and runs from July 2014 until June 2015.

== Promotion and relegation ==
Team promoted to 2014–15 Belgian Pro League

- 2013-14 Belgian Second Division Champions: Westerlo
- 2013-14 Belgian Second Division final round Winners: Mouscron-Péruwelz

Teams relegated from 2013–14 Belgian Pro League

- 15th Place: OH Leuven
- 16th Place: Mons

Teams promoted to 2014–15 Belgian Second Division

- 2013-14 Belgian Third Division A Champions: RC Mechelen
- 2013-14 Belgian Third Division B Champions: Woluwe-Zaventem
- Playoff winners: Patro Eisden Maasmechelen

Teams relegated from 2013 to 2014 Belgian Second Division

- Team folded: RWDM Brussels
- 18th Place: Visé
- Lost relegation playoffs: Hoogstraten

== European Club results ==
Champions Anderlecht qualified directly for the group stage of the Champions League, while runners-up Standard Liège started in the qualifying rounds. League numbers three and four, Club Brugge and Zulte Waregem started in the qualifying rounds of the Europa League, together with cup winners Lokeren.

Date	Team	Competition	Round	Leg	Opponent	Location	Score	Belgian Team Goalscorers
17 July 2014	Zulte Waregem	Europa League	Qual. Round 2	Leg 1, Home	(Poland) Zawisza Bydgoszcz	Regenboogstadion, Waregem	2-1	Colpaert, Plet
24 July 2014	Zulte Waregem	Europa League	Qual. Round 2	Leg 2, Away	(Poland) Zawisza Bydgoszcz	Zdzisław Krzyszkowiak Stadium, Bydgoszcz	3-1	Plet, Aneke, Skúlason
30 July 2014	Standard Liège	Champions League	Qual. Round 3	Leg 1, Home	(Greece) Panathinaikos	Stade Maurice Dufrasne, Liège	0-0	
31 July 2014	Club Brugge	Europa League	Qual. Round 3	Leg 1, Home	(Denmark) Brøndby	Jan Breydel Stadium, Bruges	3-0	Duarte, Castillo, Vázquez
31 July 2014	Zulte Waregem	Europa League	Qual. Round 3	Leg 1, Home	(Belarus) Shakhtyor Soligorsk	Regenboogstadion, Waregem	2-5	Plet, Conté
5 August 2014	Standard Liège	Champions League	Qual. Round 3	Leg 2, Away	(Greece) Panathinaikos	Leoforos Alexandras Stadium, Athens	1-2	Mbombo, M'Poku
7 August 2014	Club Brugge	Europa League	Qual. Round 3	Leg 2, Away	(Denmark) Brøndby	Brøndby Stadium, Brøndby	0-2	Castillo, Menegazzo
7 August 2014	Zulte Waregem	Europa League	Qual. Round 3	Leg 2, Away	(Belarus) Shakhtyor Soligorsk	Borisov Arena, Barysaw	2-2	Sylla (2)
20 August 2014	Standard Liège	Champions League	Play-off round	Leg 1, Home	(Russia) Zenit Saint Petersburg	Stade Maurice Dufrasne, Liège	0-1	
21 August 2014	Club Brugge	Europa League	Play-off round	Leg 1, Away	(Switzerland) Grasshopper Zürich	AFG Arena, St. Gallen	1-2	Jahić (o.g.), Vázquez
21 August 2014	Lokeren	Europa League	Play-off round	Leg 1, Home	(England) Hull City	Daknamstadion, Lokeren	1-0	Vanaken
26 August 2014	Standard Liège	Champions League	Play-off round	Leg 2, Away	(Russia) Zenit Saint Petersburg	Petrovsky Stadium, Saint Petersburg	3-0	
28 August 2014	Club Brugge	Europa League	Play-off round	Leg 2, Home	(Switzerland) Grasshopper Zürich	Jan Breydel Stadium, Bruges	1-0	Vázquez
28 August 2014	Lokeren	Europa League	Play-off round	Leg 2, Away	(England) Hull City	KC Stadium, Kingston upon Hull	2-1	Remacle
16 September 2014	Anderlecht	Champions League	Group Stage	Matchday 1, Away	(Turkey) Galatasaray	Türk Telekom Arena, Istanbul	1-1	Praet
18 September 2014	Club Brugge	Europa League	Group Stage	Matchday 1, Home	(Italy) Torino	Jan Breydel Stadium, Bruges	0-0	
18 September 2014	Lokeren	Europa League	Group Stage	Matchday 1, Away	(Poland) Legia Warsaw	Polish Army Stadium, Warsaw	1-0	
18 September 2014	Standard Liège	Europa League	Group Stage	Matchday 1, Home	(Croatia) Rijeka	Stade Maurice Dufrasne, Liège	2-0	Ciman, Araújo
1 October 2014	Anderlecht	Champions League	Group Stage	Matchday 2, Home	(Germany) Borussia Dortmund	Constant Vanden Stock Stadium, Anderlecht	0-3	
2 October 2014	Club Brugge	Europa League	Group Stage	Matchday 2, Away	(Finland) HJK Helsinki	Sonera Stadium, Helsinki	0-3	Heikkinen (o.g.), De Sutter, De Bock
2 October 2014	Lokeren	Europa League	Group Stage	Matchday 2, Home	(Ukraine) Metalist Kharkiv	Daknamstadion, Lokeren	1-0	De Pauw
2 October 2014	Standard Liège	Europa League	Group Stage	Matchday 2, Away	(Netherlands) Feyenoord	De Kuip, Rotterdam	2-1	Viera
22 October 2014	Anderlecht	Champions League	Group Stage	Matchday 3, Home	(England) Arsenal	Constant Vanden Stock Stadium, Anderlecht	1-2	Najar
23 October 2014	Club Brugge	Europa League	Group Stage	Matchday 3, Home	(Denmark) Copenhagen	Jan Breydel Stadium, Bruges	1-1	Vázquez
23 October 2014	Lokeren	Europa League	Group Stage	Matchday 3, Away	(Turkey) Trabzonspor	Hüseyin Avni Aker Stadium, Trabzon	2-0	
23 October 2014	Standard Liège	Europa League	Group Stage	Matchday 3, Home	(Spain) Sevilla	Stade Maurice Dufrasne, Liège	0-0	
4 November 2014	Anderlecht	Champions League	Group Stage	Matchday 4, Away	(England) Arsenal	Emirates Stadium, London	3-3	Vanden Borre (2), Mitrović
6 November 2014	Club Brugge	Europa League	Group Stage	Matchday 4, Away	(Denmark) Copenhagen	Telia Parken, Copenhagen	0-4	Refaelov (3), Vormer
6 November 2014	Lokeren	Europa League	Group Stage	Matchday 4, Home	(Turkey) Trabzonspor	Daknamstadion, Lokeren	1-1	Patosi
6 November 2014	Standard Liège	Europa League	Group Stage	Matchday 4, Away	(Spain) Sevilla	Ramón Sánchez Pizjuán Stadium, Seville	3-1	M'Poku
26 November 2014	Anderlecht	Champions League	Group Stage	Matchday 5, Home	(Turkey) Galatasaray	Constant Vanden Stock Stadium, Anderlecht	2-0	Mbemba (2)
27 November 2014	Club Brugge	Europa League	Group Stage	Matchday 5, Away	(Italy) Torino	Stadio Olimpico di Torino, Turin	0-0	
27 November 2014	Lokeren	Europa League	Group Stage	Matchday 5, Home	(Poland) Legia Warsaw	Daknamstadion, Lokeren	1-0	Vanaken
27 November 2014	Standard Liège	Europa League	Group Stage	Matchday 5, Away	(Croatia) Rijeka	Stadion Kantrida, Rijeka	2-0	
9 December 2014	Anderlecht	Champions League	Group Stage	Matchday 6, Away	(Germany) Borussia Dortmund	Westfalenstadion, Dortmund	1-1	Mitrović
11 December 2014	Club Brugge	Europa League	Group Stage	Matchday 6, Home	(Finland) HJK Helsinki	Jan Breydel Stadium, Bruges	2-1	Gedoz, Refaelov
11 December 2014	Lokeren	Europa League	Group Stage	Matchday 6, Away	(Ukraine) Metalist Kharkiv	Arena Lviv, Lviv	0-1	Leye
11 December 2014	Standard Liège	Europa League	Group Stage	Matchday 6, Home	(Netherlands) Feyenoord	Stade Maurice Dufrasne, Liège	0-3	
19 February 2015	Anderlecht	Europa League	Round of 32	Leg 1, Home	(Russia) Dynamo Moscow	Constant Vanden Stock Stadium, Anderlecht	0-0	
19 February 2015	Club Brugge	Europa League	Round of 32	Leg 1, Away	(Denmark) AaB Fodbold	Nordjyske Arena, Aalborg	1-3	Oulare, Refaelov, Petersen (o.g.)
26 February 2015	Anderlecht	Europa League	Round of 32	Leg 2, Away	(Russia) Dynamo Moscow	Arena Khimki, Khimki	3-1	Mitrović
26 February 2015	Club Brugge	Europa League	Round of 32	Leg 2, Home	(Denmark) AaB Fodbold	Jan Breydel Stadium, Bruges	3-0	Vázquez, Oulare, Bolingoli
12 March 2015	Club Brugge	Europa League	Round of 16	Leg 1, Home	(Turkey) Beşiktaş	Jan Breydel Stadium, Bruges	2-1	De Sutter, Refaelov
19 March 2015	Club Brugge	Europa League	Round of 16	Leg 2, Away	(Turkey) Beşiktaş	Atatürk Olympic Stadium, Istanbul	1-3	De Sutter, Bolingoli (2)
16 April 2015	Club Brugge	Europa League	Quarter-finals	Leg 1, Home	(Ukraine) Dnipro Dnipropetrovsk	Jan Breydel Stadium, Bruges	0-0	
23 April 2015	Club Brugge	Europa League	Quarter-finals	Leg 2, Away	(Ukraine) Dnipro Dnipropetrovsk	Olimpiyskiy National Sports Complex, Kyiv	1-0	

1. Metalist Kharkiv play their home matches at Arena Lviv, Lviv instead of their regular stadium, Metalist Stadium, Kharkiv, due to the pro-Russian unrest in Ukraine.
2. Dnipro Dnipropetrovsk played their home match at Olympic Stadium, Kyiv instead of their regular stadium, Dnipro-Arena, Dnipropetrovsk, due to the war conditions in Eastern Ukraine.

== Other honours ==
Competition	Winner
Cup	Club Brugge
Supercup	Anderlecht
Third division A	Coxyde
Third division B	Cappellen
Promotion A	Petegem
Promotion B	Overijse
Promotion C	Beerschot Wilrijk
Promotion D	RFC Liège

== European qualification for 2015–16 summary ==
Competition	Qualifiers	Reason for Qualification
UEFA Champions League Group Stage		1st in Jupiler Pro League
UEFA Champions League Third Qualifying Round for Non-Champions		2nd in Jupiler Pro League
UEFA Europa League Play-off Round		Cup winner
UEFA Europa League Third Qualifying Round		3rd in Jupiler Pro League
UEFA Europa League Second Qualifying Round		Europa League Playoff winner

== See also ==
- 2014–15 Belgian Pro League
- 2014–15 Belgian Cup
- 2014 Belgian Super Cup
- Belgian Second Division
- Belgian Third Division: divisions A and B
- Belgian Promotion: divisions A, B, C and D
