= 2005–06 in Belgian football =

Football in Belgium
- Season: 2005–06

The 2005–06 season was the 103rd competitive season in Belgian football.

== Overview ==
For the first season since 2000, the football fancard is not needed to see a first division game. Tickets for matches can now be purchased with a single ID card and on the day of the match, which was not permitted since the introduction of the fancard. Furthermore, for the second season in history (the first time was in the 1960s), one game of each matchday is shown on public television. Another premiere is that every Jupiler League game can be watched on a private television channel.

== Honours ==
Competition	Winner
First division	Anderlecht
Cup	Zulte-Waregem
Supercup	Anderlecht
Second division	Mons
Third division A	Dender
Third division B	Tienen

== Events ==
- July 30, 2005 - Club Brugge claim the first silverware of the season when they beat Germinal Beerschot 1-1 (4-2 on penalties) to win the Supercup.
- September 22, 2005 - Germinal Beerschot coach Marc Brys is sacked after having collected 4 points in 7 matches. He is replaced by Jos Daerden.
- September 29, 2005 - The two Belgian clubs playing the UEFA Cup (Genk and Germinal Beerschot) are defeated in the first round.
- October 3, 2005 - AA Louviéroise coach Emilio Ferrera is sacked due to the poor debut of his team (4 points in 9 matches).
- October 20, 2005 - Gilbert Bodart is confirmed as the new AA Louviéroise coach.
- November 2, 2005 - Paul Put is sacked as manager of Lierse SK because of a lack of results (8 points in 11 matches).
- November 7, 2005 - René Trost replaces Paul Put at the helm of Lierse SK.
- November 22, 2005 - Gil Vandenbrouck replaces Geert Brouckaert as caretaker of Mouscron.
- December 12, 2005 - the Serbian coach Slavoljub Muslin of KSC Lokeren OV signs a contract with Lokomotiv Moskva starting on January 1, 2006.
- December 23, 2005 - Aimé Anthuenis replaces Muslin at the helm of KSC Lokeren OV.
- January 9, 2006 - Mouscron chooses Paul Put as a new coach.
- February 5, 2006 - the match-fixing scandal starts with the Flemish TV programme Panorama.
- February 9, 2006 - coach Herman Vermeulen is fired by Sint-Truidense VV after the cup defeat to Charleroi in the quarter-finals and a poor 18 points in 21 matches in the championship. He is replaced two days later by Thomas Caers.
- February 14, 2006 - As the main coach Aimé Anthuenis suffers from chest pains, he is replaced by coaches Rudy Cossey and Wlodek Lubanski.
- February 17, 2006 - Paul Put is sacked by Mouscron for being involved in the match-fixing scandal, and is replaced by Gil Vandenbrouck. Former Lierse players Marius Mitu and Laurent Delorge are fired by their club Anderlecht for the same reason.
- February 21, 2006 - Gilbert Bodart resigns as AA Louviéroise coach as he is cited as a potential actor in the match-fixing scandal. He is replaced by Frédéric Tilmant.
- February 23, 2006 - Club Brugge is eliminated from the UEFA Cup after a double 2–1 defeat to AS Roma. It was the last Belgian club competing in a European cup.
- February 27, 2006 - The former Belgium coach Aimé Anthuenis stops his coaching career for medical reasons.
- April 3, 2006 - Jan Ceulemans is sacked as Club Brugge manager and is replaced by Emilio Ferrera.
- April 24, 2006 - Gent player Mbark Boussoufa receives the Belgian Ebony Shoe.
- May 5, 2006 - Anderlecht finally wins the Jupiler League on the last matchday with a 3–0 victory against Zulte-Waregem. Lierse finished 17th and is qualified for the second division final round.
- May 7, 2006 - Mons wins the second division thanks to the defeat of leader KVSK United to Oud-Heverlee Leuven. Mbark Boussoufa wins the professional footballer of the year award.

== National team ==
Belgium continued their qualifying campaign for the Football World Cup 2006 but did not qualify.

Date	Venue	Opponents	Score*	Comp	Belgium scorers	Match Report
August 17, 2005	King Baudouin Stadium, Brussels (H)	Greece	2-0	F	Emile Mpenza, Mbo Mpenza	www.dhnet.be
September 3, 2005	Bilino Polje, Zenica (A)	Bosnia and Herzegovina	0-1	WCQ		www.dhnet.be
September 7, 2005	Olympisch Stadion, Antwerp (H)	San Marino	8-0	WCQ	Timmy Simons (p), Koen Daerden (2), Thomas Buffel, Mbo Mpenza (2), Kevin Vandenbergh, Daniel Van Buyten	www.dhnet.be
October 8, 2005	King Baudouin Stadium, Brussels (H)	Spain	0-2	WCQ		www.sport.be
October 12, 2005	Vėtra Stadium, Vilnius (A)	Lithuania	1-1	WCQ	Karel Geraerts	www.sport.be
March 1, 2006	Stade Josy Barthel, Luxembourg (A)	Luxembourg	2-0**	F	Kevin Vandenbergh, Luigi Pieroni	www.sport.be
May 11, 2006	Wagner & Partners Stadion, Sittard (A)	Saudi Arabia	2-1	F	Tom Caluwé, Anthony Vanden Borre	www.sport.be
May 20, 2006	Štadión Antona Malatinského, Trnava (A)	Slovakia	1-1	F	Karel Geraerts	www.sport.be
May 24, 2006	Fenix Stadion, Genk (H)	Turkey	3-3	F	İbrahim Toraman (o.g.), Wesley Sonck, Carl Hoefkens	www.sport.be

* Belgium score given first
** Match stopped after 65 minutes because of bad weather

Key

- H = Home match
- A = Away match
- F = Friendly
- WCQ = FIFA World Cup 2006 Qualifying, European Zone Group 7
- o.g. = own goal

== European Qualification ==
Competition	Qualifiers	Reason for Qualification
UEFA Champions League	R.S.C. Anderlecht	1st in first division
UEFA Champions League Third Qualifying Round	Standard Liège	2nd in first division
UEFA Cup	Club Brugge	3rd in first division
UEFA Cup	S.V. Zulte-Waregem	Cup winners
UEFA Cup	K.S.V. Roeselare	via the fairplay draw
UEFA Intertoto Cup 3rd round	K.A.A. Gent	Highest first division finishers (4th) to have entered and not qualified for any other European competition

== See also ==
- Belgian First Division 2005-06
- 2005–06 Belgian Cup
- 2005 Belgian Super Cup
- Belgian Second Division
- Belgian Third Division: divisions A and B
- Belgian Promotion: divisions A, B, C and D
