= KFC Verbroedering Geel =

Geel
- Full name: Koninklijke Football Club; Verbroedering Geel
- Nickname: –
- Founded: 1912 (FC Flandria); 1919 (Geel Sport); 1921 (merger)
- Dissolved: 2008
- Ground: De Leunen, Geel
- Capacity: 8,000
- Chairman: (Belgium) William Verkest (ad interim)
- Manager: (Belgium) Geert Persoons
- League: none
- 2006–07: Belgian Third Division A, 3rd
| Home colours | Away colours |

KFC Verbroedering Geel was a Belgian association football club from the city of Geel in Antwerp (province).

== History ==
The club was born in 1921 as a merger of Flandria and Geel Sport, becoming Flandria Geel Sport, and registered in 1924 to the Belgian Football Association receiving the matricule n° 395 after changing its name to FC Verbroedering Geel. It played for the first time in the second division in 1985–86. In 1999–2000 it appeared shortly in the first division as it won the second division final round. At this time the club merged with neighbours from K.F.C. Herentals leaving both name and matricule of the latter club.

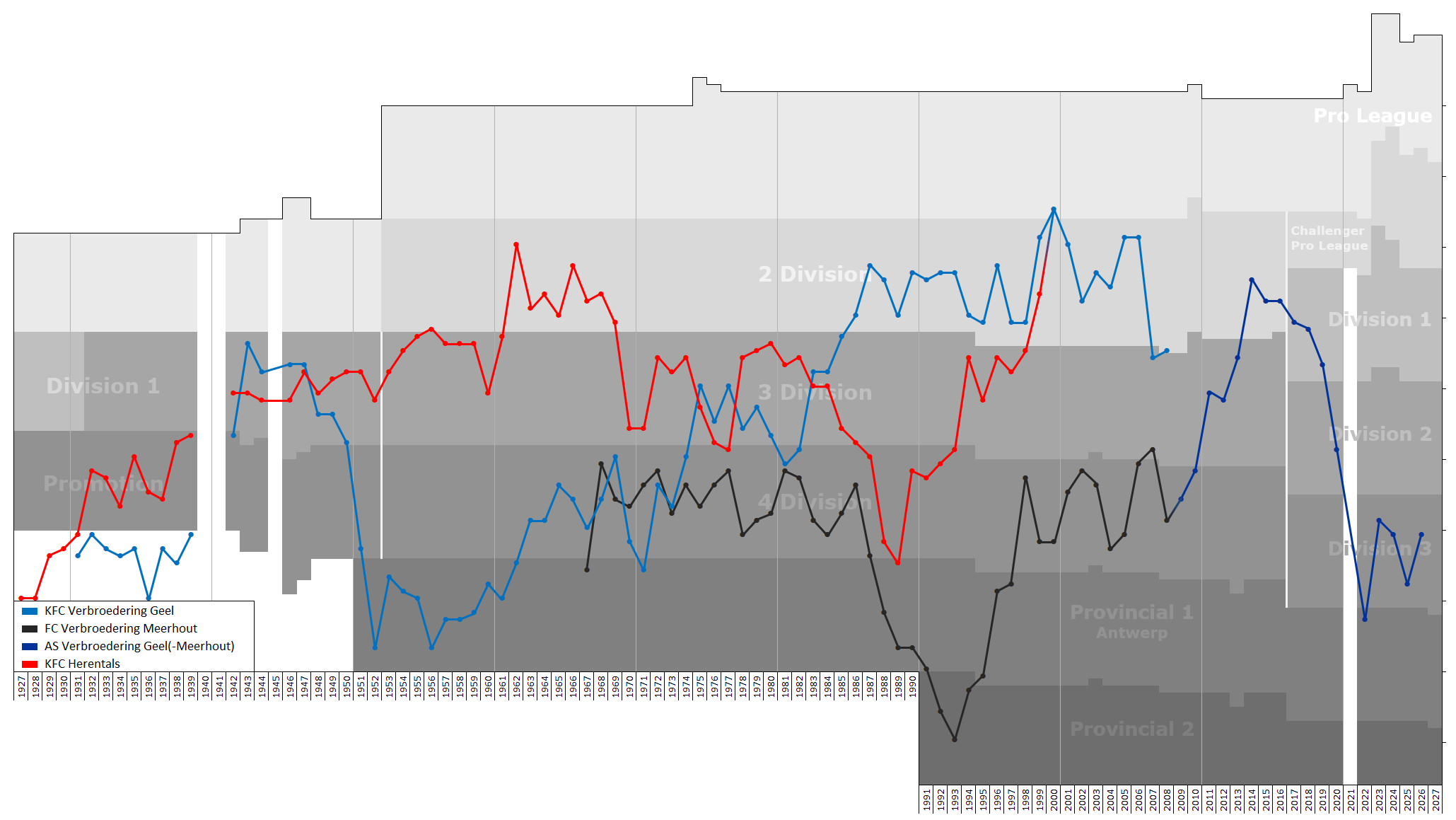
Historical chart of Verbroedering Geel league performance

On 30 November 2005 Verbroedering Geel is judged by the Control Commission of the FA for having falsified the 2004–05 second division final round and is subsequently downgraded to the third division. The judgement was confirmed on 1 March 2006 after which chairman Vic Keersmaekers resigned. Eventually on 13 April 2006 the Evocation Commission cancelled the decision of the Control Commission. Though on 3 May 2006 it was confirmed by the Appeal Commission of the FA that the club would be relegated. It thus seized the Evocation Commission. The executive committee of the FA decided on 8 May 2006 to let Geel play the 2005–06 second division final round although the rules of the competition state that a relegated club cannot take part in the final round. On 15 June 2006 the Evocation Commission rejected the plaint of Geel and the club was then officially relegated to the third division, permitting K.M. S.K. Deinze to avoid relegation.

The club was suffering serious financial trouble. Conversations were started with the Egyptian group Wadi Degla Investment to take over the club. Eventually they chose to take over Lierse and KFC Turnhout. On 30 June 2008, the club filed for bankruptcy and ultimately ceased to exist.

A different local team Verbroedering Meerhout, playing in Belgian Promotion, chose to move to the stadium of Verbroedering Geel due to better facilities. They changed their name to Verbroedering Geel-Meerhout, a symbolic merger.

== Honours ==
- Belgian Second Division final round:
  - Winners (1): 1998–99
- Belgian Third Division B:
  - Winners (1): 1984–85
- Belgian Third Division final round:
  - Winners (1): 2006–07
