= Leunen =

Leunen may refer to:

- De Leunen, a football stadium in Geel, Belgium
- Maarty Leunen (born 1985), American basketball player
- Leunen, a village in Venray, Limburg, Netherlands

== See also ==
- Christine Leunens (born 1964), American-born New Zealand-Belgian novelist
