= Siniša Končalović =

Croatian footballer (born 1966)

Personal information
- Full name: Siniša Končalović
- Date of birth: 24 October 1968 (age 58)
- Place of birth: Osijek, SFR Yugoslavia
- Position: Midfielder

Senior career*
Years	Team	Apps	(Gls)
1985–1991	Osijek		
1991–1992	Mallorca	2	(0)
1992–1994	Panachaiki	31	(3)
1994–1995	Estrela da Amadora	7	(0)
1995–1996	Vorwärts Steyr	12	(0)
1996–1997	Royal Antwerp	13	(1)
1997–1998	Verbroedering Geel		
1999–2000	Sporting Charleroi	16	(0)
2000–2001	Charleroi-Marchienne	24	(1)
2001–2002	Capellen		
- * Club domestic league appearances and goals

Siniša Končalović (born 24 October 1966) is a Croatian retired footballer who played as a midfielder for clubs in Yugoslavia, Spain, Greece, Portugal, Austria and Belgium.

== Club career ==
Born in Osijek, Končalović began playing football for local side NK Osijek.

In 1992, Končalović joined Super League Greece side Panachaiki for the two seasons appearing in 31 league matches for the club.
