= De Leunen =

Football stadium in Geel, Belgium

Coordinates: 51.1703°N 4.96834°E

Leunenstadion
- De Leunen
- Interactive map of Leunenstadion
- Location: Geel, Belgium
- Capacity: 8,000
- Surface: Grass

Tenant
- K.F.C. Verbroedering Geel

De Leunen is a football stadium in Geel, in the Belgian province of Antwerp. It has a capacity of 8,000 after the most recent renovation works. It used to be the home ground of K.F.C. Verbroedering Geel until the club went into liquidation in 2008. Subsequently, the neighbouring club of FC Verbroedering Meerhout left their Kattenstadion in Meerhout to play at De Leunen. The club then changed its name to Verbroedering Geel-Meerhout. In 2012 the club changed its same again to ASV Geel.
