= Standaard Wetteren =

Belgian football club

- Full name: Koninklijke Standaard Wetteren
- Founded: 1930; 96 years ago
- Dissolved: 2015; 11 years ago
- Ground: Marcel De Kerpelstadion, Wetteren
- Capacity: 3,000
- 2014–15: Belgian Fourth Division A, 9th
Home colours	Away colours

Standaard Wetteren was a Belgian association football club team from Wetteren. Its matricule (5479) still exists as it was sold to investors who created a new team, RWD Molenbeek The Matricule 47.

== History ==
The club was founded as an amateur club named Standaard Molenhoek. They changed their name to Football Club Standaard Wetteren in 1951 as they chose to register with the Belgian Football Association. They became champions in Third Division A in the 2008–09 season and thus were promoted for the first time in their history to Second Division, where they play three seasons until they were relegated twice back to the fourth tier and in 2015 they announced a merger with neighbors Royal Racing Club Wetteren-Kwatrecht (founded in 1920, matricule 95) to become Royal Football Club Wetteren. The matricule 5479 was ceded to a Brussels-based project that aims to form a club bearing the initials "RWDM", named RWD Molenbeek the Matricule 47.
