= ASV Geel =

Belgian football club

- Full name: Allemaal Samen Verbroedering Geel
- Founded: 1926; 100 years ago
- Ground: De Leunen
- Capacity: 8,000
- Manager: Peter Schrauwen
- League: Belgian Division 3
- 2025–26: Belgian Division 3 VV B, 6th of 16
- Website: asvgeel.be
Home colours	Away colours

Allemaal Samen Verbroedering Geel, commonly known as ASV Geel, is a Belgian association football club based in Geel, province of Antwerp. The team competes in the Belgian Division 3, the fifth level of the Belgian football league system.

== History ==
Founded in 1926 as Meerhout Sport, the club received the matricule number 893. In 1966, Meerhout Sport merged with the other club from the city named Hand in Hand, with matricule 2169. The new club took the name F.C. Verbroedering Meerhout. At the end of the season, the club reached the Belgian Promotion. They were relegated to the provincial level in 1987. Ten years later, the club was back at the 4th national level, and even managed to reach the third division in 2006, where they stayed only one season. In 2008 the neighbour club of K.F.C. Verbroedering Geel went into liquidation, so F.C. Verbroedering Meerhout moved to De Leunen stadium, which was not used anymore, and added the name of the city Geel to their name.

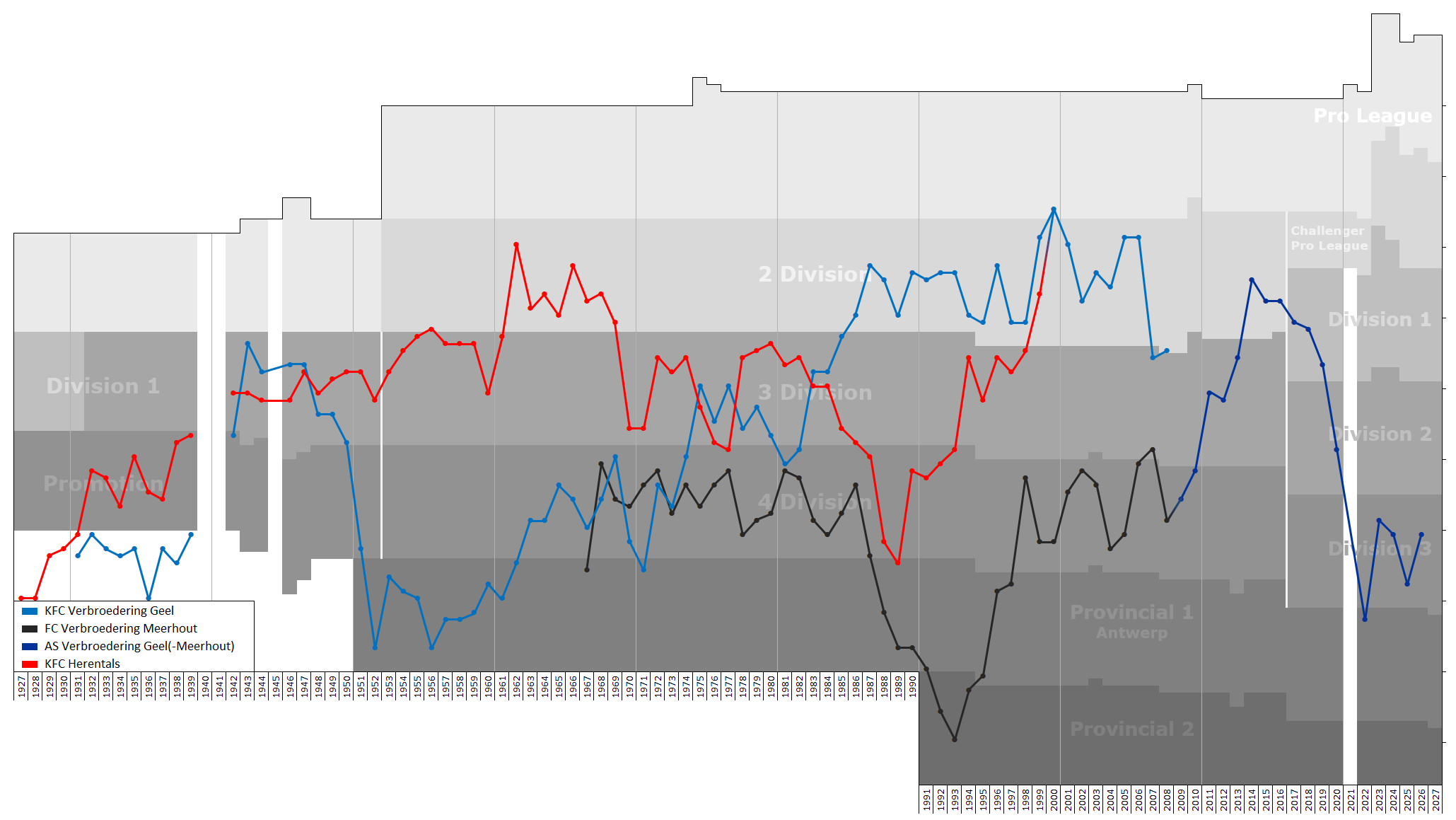
Historical chart of Verbroedering Geel league performance

In 2013, the team changed their name to Allemaal Samen Verbroedering Geel (lit. 'All Together Fraternization Geel'), short AS Verbroedering Geel.

On 22 January 2020, due to financial difficulties, Geel announced that during the 2019–20 transfer window all players and technical staff had been released without any transfer fee, to avoid bankrupting the club. Youth players would play the remaining matches and management will devise a plan for the coming seasons. Eventually, Geel did not receive a license for both the Second and Third Amateur divisions and was relegated to the Belgian Provincial Leagues. Geel appealed the decision to not being awarded a license.
