= Racing Waregem =

Association football club in Belgium

K. Racing Waregem
- Full name: Koninklijk Racing Waregem
- Nickname: De Rassing
- Founded: 1941; 85 years ago
- Capacity: 2960
- Manager: Nico Cottenier
- League: 1. Provincial League
- 2016-17: 10
- Website: https://www.racingwaregem.be
Home colours	Away colours

Koninklijke Racing Waregem is a Belgian football club based in Waregem alongside rival club Zulte-Waregem. It is currently playing in the Eerste Provinciale, the sixth tier of Belgian football. The team play at the Mirakelstadion, which holds 2,960 seats.

== History ==
It was founded in 1941 as Racing Kleithoek but it changed its name to Racing Waregem two years later when it registered to the Belgian Football Association. The club changed its name again in 1992. In 2006, they finished fifth in the Belgian Third Division A and won the promotion playoff to play in the second tier. This would only last for one year, as they just failed to complete an amazing come-back during the second half of the season. Waregem finally ended 17th and were relegated back to Third Division A.
