= Belgian Third Division B =

Belgian football league

The Belgian Third Division B was one of the two leagues at the third level of the Belgian football league system, the other one being the Belgian Third Division A. This division existed from the 1952–53 until 2015–16 seasons and was played every year with 18 clubs from 2009. Prior to this, the third level in the Belgian football league system was called Promotion and was divided into four leagues of 16 clubs each and prior to the 1931–32 season, the Promotion was divided into three leagues. Due to restructuring, the Third Division was replaced by Belgian Second Amateur Division which plays as three leagues of 16 clubs each from the 2016–17 season.

== The final clubs ==
Club	Municipality	Province	Finishing position 2014–15 season
FCO Beerschot Wilrijk	Wilrijk	Antwerp	1st of promotion C
K. Berchem Sport	Berchem	Antwerp	12th
K. Bocholter V.V.	Bocholt	Limburg	5th
R.F.C. Union Calamine	La Calamine	Liège	10th
R. Cappellen F.C.	Kapellen	Antwerp	1st^{1}
R.U. Wallone Ciney	Ciney	Namur	4th
K. Diegem Sport	Machelen	Flemish Brabant	14th
K.S.C. Grimbergen	Grimbergen	Flemish Brabant	15th
R.R.C. Hamoir	Hamoir	Liège	4th of promotion D^{2}
K.S.K. Hasselt	Hasselt	Limburg	7th
Hoogstraten VV	Hoogstraten	Antwerp	8th
R.F.C. de Liège	Liège	Liège	1st of promotion D
KFC Oosterzonen Oosterwijk	Westerlo	Antwerp	9th
Tempo Overijse	Ternat	Flemish Brabant	1st of promotion B
R. Sprimont Comblain Sport	Sprimont	Liège	2nd
K.V.K. Tienen	Tienen	Flemish Brabant	13th
R. Wallonia Walhain CG	Walhain	Walloon Brabant	6th
K.V. Woluwe-Zaventem	Zaventem	Flemish Brabant	18th of second division

— Refused promotion by declining to apply for a remunerative license
— R.R.C. Hamoir won in the first round of the Promotion play-off

== Past winners ==
- 1953: R. Uccle Sport
- 1954: S.R. Union Verviers
- 1955: R.R.C. Tournaisien
- 1956: K. Patro Eisden
- 1957: K.S.C. Eendracht Aalst
- 1958: R.F.C. Sérésien
- 1959: K. Olse Merksem S.C.
- 1960: Union Royale Namur
- 1961: K.F.C. Herentals
- 1962: R. Crossing Club Molenbeek
- 1963: K. Boom F.C.
- 1964: K. Sint-Niklase S.K.
- 1965: R.F.C. Sérésien
- 1966: S.K. Beveren-Waas
- 1967: R.R.C. Tirlemont
- 1968: R.C.S. Brugeois
- 1969: S.V. Sottegem
- 1970: K.A.S. Eupen
- 1971: K. Boom F.C.
- 1972: K.F.C. Winterslag
- 1973: A.S. Oostende
- 1974: K.V.G. Oostende
- 1975: K. Patro Eisden
- 1976: K.A.S. Eupen
- 1977: K.S.C. Hasselt
- 1978: K.R.C. Harelbeke
- 1979: K. Hoeselt V.V.
- 1980: R.F.C. Sérésien
- 1981: K. Witgoor Sport Dessel
- 1982: V.V. Overpelt Fabriek
- 1983: K. Wuustwezel F.C.
- 1984: K. Patro Eisden
- 1985: K.F.C. Verbroedering Geel
- 1986: F.C. Assent
- 1987: K.F.C. Lommelse S.K.
- 1988: K.F.C. Germinal Ekeren
- 1989: F.C. Zwarte Leeuw
- 1990: K.F.C. Turnhout
- 1991: R.F.C. Sérésien
- 1992: K. Beerschot V.A.V.
- 1993: K.V.C. Westerlo
- 1994: K. Patro Eisden
- 1995: K.F.C. Tielen
- 1996: R. Tilleur F.C. Liégeois
- 1997: K.F.C. Dessel Sport
- 1998: K.F.C. Herentals
- 1999: K.V.K. Tienen
- 2000: K.S.K. Heusden-Zolder
- 2001: R.E. Virton
- 2002: K.A.S. Eupen
- 2003: A.F.C. Tubize
- 2004: R. Union Saint-Gilloise
- 2005: K.V.S.K. United Overpelt-Lommel
- 2006: K.V.K. Tienen
- 2007: R.O.C. de Charleroi-Marchienne
- 2008: R.F.C. de Liège
- 2009: K.F.C. Turnhout
- 2010: C.S. Visé
- 2011: WS Woluwe
- 2012: K.F.C. Dessel Sport
- 2013: R.E. Virton
- 2014: K.V. Woluwe-Zaventem
- 2015: R. Cappellen F.C. (declined promotion)

== See also ==
- Belgian Second Division
- Belgian Third Division A
- Belgian Fourth Division
- Belgian football league system
