= KSV Oudenaarde =

Belgian football club

Oudenaarde
- Full name: Koninklijke Sportvereniging Oudenaarde
- Founded: 1919; 107 years ago
- Ground: Burgemeester Thienpontstadion
- Capacity: 5,000
- Chairman: Kurt Vandeputte
- Manager: Stefan Leleu
- League: Belgian Division 2
- 2025–26: Belgian Division 2 VV A, 13th of 16
- Website: ksvoudenaarde.be

Koninklijke Sport Vereniging Oudenaarde is a Belgian association football club based in Oudenaarde, East Flanders. The team competes in the Belgian Division 2, the fourth tier of the Belgian football league system. The club's colours are black and yellow.

== History ==
Founded in 1911 as S.K. Aldenardia, the club merged with F.C. Audenarais in 1919 to become S.V. Audenaerde. The name was later changed to S.V. Oudenaarde, with the city name spelled in Dutch instead of the French name Audenaerde. In 1951, the club received the right to use the royal prefix Koninklijke.

Being the Member of the Belgian Football Association since 1912, the club first reached the second division in 1924, for just one year as they finished last of their series. The come back to this level of the competition was not operated before season 1980–81. This time, the team managed to end in the seventh position, their best position ever in the club's history. The same position was achieved the following year, but in 1983, they could not avoid relegation. In 1988 they finished last of the third division A. Subsequently, they were relegated to the fourth level of Belgian football, promotion, and could not come back again before the new century. In 2006 Oudenaarde was crowned champion of the promotion A.
