= VW Hamme =

Belgian football club

Hamme
- Full name: Koninklijke Football Club Vigor Wuitens Hamme
- Nickname: De Wuitens
- Founded: 2 May 1908; 118 years ago
- Ground: Gemeentelijk Stadion Vigor Wuitens Hamme, Hamme
- Capacity: 6,000
- Chairman: Bart De Bruyne-Van den Broeck
- Manager: Kim Verstraeten
- League: Belgian Division 2
- 2025–26: Belgian Division 2 VV A, 10th of 16
- Website: vwhamme.be
Home colours	Away colours

Koninklijke Football Club Vigor Wuitens Hamme, simply known as VW Hamme is a Belgian association football club based in Hamme, East Flanders. The club is affiliated to the Royal Belgian Football Association (KBVB) under matricule 211 and plays in the Belgian Division 2, the fourth tier of the Belgian league system. The team's colours are blue and black, and the club is nicknamed De Wuitens. (Note: Wuitens refers to local Hamme folklore; see e.g. the recognised heritage group "Die Hamse Wuitens".)

== History ==
The club was founded on 2 May 1908 as Vigor FC Hamme-sur-Durme, initially joining the UBSSA, the forerunner of the Belgian FA. It affiliated to the RBFA in 1922 and received matricule 211 in 1926; in 1934 it was granted the royal designation and became K.F.C. Vigor Hamme. The club first reached the national divisions in the 1930s and, during the World War II era, rose as high as the second tier (then known as Division 1).

On 1 July 1972, Vigor merged with local side Jonge Wuitens V.V. Hamme. The merged club adopted the name K.F.C. Vigor Wuitens Hamme and retained matricule 211. After a difficult period that included relegation to the provincial leagues, Hamme returned to the national structure in the early 1980s and climbed back to the third tier in 1992.

Hamme won Third Division A in 1996–97 to earn promotion to the second tier for the first time in almost half a century; after one season it returned to the third level but won promotion again in 2002 and subsequently spent most of the 2000s in the second division. In 2009, the club was relegated to the third tier, but it won the third-tier title again in 2015–16 amid the national league reform that created the amateur divisions; Sporza noted Hamme as champions of Third Division A as the new structure came into effect.

After several seasons at amateur level, Hamme missed out on the 2023–24 Third Amateur (Derde Afdeling VV A) title by a narrow margin, but in 2024–25 secured promotion via the play-offs, defeating Schoonbeek-Beverst 3–1 in Hamme. Local press described the win as a release for the club, achieved despite finishing runners-up in the regular season. The result returned Hamme to the Belgian Division 2 for 2025–26.

== Stadium ==
Hamme play home matches at the Gemeentelijk Stadion Vigor Wuitens Hamme in Sportpleinstraat, Hamme. The ground has a capacity of approximately 6,000.

== Honours ==
Hamme honours
Honour	No.	Years
Belgian Third Division	3	1941–42, 1996–97, 2015–16
Belgian Fourth Division	2	1961–62, 1991–92
