= Belgian Third Division A =

Belgian football league

The Belgian Third Division A was one of the two leagues at the third level of the Belgian football league system, the other one being the Belgian Third Division B. This division existed from the 1952–53 to 2015–16 seasons and was played every year with 18 clubs from 2009. Prior to this, the third level in the Belgian football league system was called Promotion and was divided into four leagues of 16 clubs each and prior to the 1931–32 season, the Promotion was divided into three leagues. Due to restructuring, the Third Division was replaced by Belgian Second Amateur Division which plays as three leagues of 16 clubs each from the 2016–17 season.

== The final clubs ==
Club	Municipality	Province	Finishing position 2014–15 season
SC Eendracht Aalst	Aalst	East Flanders	9th of Belgian Second Division
R. ES Acrenoise	Lessines	Hainaut	3rd of Belgian Promotion B^{1}
K. Rupel Boom F.C.	Boom	Antwerp	5th
K.S.V. Bornem	Bornem	Antwerp	13th
K. Olsa Brakel	Brakel	East Flanders	4th
F.C. Verbroedering Dender EH	Hekelgem	East Flanders	9th
K.R.C. Gent-Zeehaven	Ghent	East Flanders	10th
FC Gullegem	Gullegem	West Flanders	12th
K.F.C. Vigor Wuitens Hamme	Hamme	East Flanders	8th
K.F.C. Izegem	Izegem	West Flanders	14th
UR La Louvière Centre	La Louvière	Hainaut	11th of third division B
K. Londerzeel S.K.	Ronse	Flemish Brabant	11th
K.R.C. Mechelen	Mechelen	Antwerp	17th of second division
K.S.V. Oudenaarde	Oudenaarde	East Flanders	6th
K.F.C. Sparta Petegem	Deinze	East Flanders	1st of promotion A
K.V.C. Sint-Elois-Winkel Sport	Ledegem	West Flanders	7th
Sportkring Sint-Niklaas	Sint-Niklaas	East Flanders	2nd of promotion A^{2}
K.S.V. Temse	Temse	East Flanders	3rd
Torhout 1992 KM	Torhout	West Flanders	15th

— R. ES Acrenoise won the Belgian Promotion play-off; admitted to replace defunct R.A.E.C. Mons
— SK Sint-Niklaas promoted via the Belgian Promotion play-off

== Past winners ==
- 1953: Tubantia F.C.
- 1954: K.F.C. Izegem
- 1955: K.F.C. Herentals
- 1956: R.C.S. Brugeois
- 1957: F.C. Diest
- 1958: R.F.C. Renaisien
- 1959: R.R.C. de Bruxelles
- 1960: K.F.C. Turnhout
- 1961: A.S. Oostende
- 1962: K.R.C. Mechelen
- 1963: K.S.V. Waregem
- 1964: K. Waterschei S.V. Thor Genk
- 1965: K. Willebroekse S.V.
- 1966: K.R.C. Mechelen
- 1967: R.R.C. Tournaisien
- 1968: K.F.C. Turnhout
- 1969: K.R.C. Mechelen
- 1970: R.A.A. Louviéroise
- 1971: K.S.K. Tongeren
- 1972: K.S.C. Lokeren
- 1973: Olse Merksem S.C.
- 1974: K. Waterschei S.V. Thor Genk
- 1975: K.A.A. Gent
- 1976: Royale Union
- 1977: K.S.C. Eendracht Aalst
- 1978: K.F.C. Turnhout
- 1979: Racing Jet de Bruxelles
- 1980: K.S.V. Oudenaarde
- 1981: K. Stade Leuven
- 1982: K. Sint-Niklase S.K.
- 1983: Racing Jet de Bruxelles
- 1984: Royale Union Saint-Gilloise
- 1985: R.A.E.C. Mons
- 1986: K.R.C. Harelbeke
- 1987: K.F.C. Eeklo
- 1988: K. Stade Leuven
- 1989: K. Sint-Niklase S.K.
- 1990: K.R.C. Harelbeke
- 1991: R.E. Mouscron
- 1992: K.V. Oostende
- 1993: K.M.S.K. Deinze
- 1994: R.A.A. Louviéroise
- 1995: R. Cappellen F.C.
- 1996: R.O.C. de Charleroi
- 1997: K.F.C. Vigor Wuitens Hamme
- 1998: K.S.K. Roeselare
- 1999: K.S.V. Ingelmunster
- 2000: K.F.C. Strombeek
- 2001: K.S.K. Ronse
- 2002: S.V. Zulte Waregem
- 2003: K. Berchem Sport
- 2004: K.V. Red Star Waasland
- 2005: Y.R. K.V. Mechelen
- 2006: F.C. Verbroedering Dender E.H.
- 2007: R.F.C. Tournai
- 2008: K.S.K. Ronse
- 2009: K. Standaard Wetteren
- 2010: K.S.K. Heist
- 2011: Eendracht Aalst
- 2012: Royal Mouscron-Péruwelz
- 2013: Hoogstraten VV
- 2014: K.R.C. Mechelen
- 2015: K.V.V. Coxyde

== See also ==
- Belgian Second Division
- Belgian Third Division B
- Belgian Promotion
- Belgian football league system
