= Belgian Fourth Division C =

The Belgian Third Division C was one of the four leagues at the fourth level of the Belgian football league system, the other ones being the Belgian Fourth Division A, B and D. This division existed from the 1952-53 to 2015-16 seasons and was played every year with 16 clubs in each league. The league was replaced by Belgian Second Amateur Division.

== The final clubs ==
Club	Municipality	Province	Finishing position 2014–15 season
K. Bilzerse Waltwilder V.V.	Bilzen	Limburg	10th
K.S.C. City Pirates	Merksem	Antwerp	4th
K.F.C. Esperanza Pelt	Neerpelt	Limburg	2nd of Limburg Division One
R.C. Hades	Kiewit	Limburg	3rd
K.E.S.K. Leopoldsburg	Leopoldsburg	Limburg	12th
K.F.C. Lille	Lille	Antwerp	1st of Antwerp Division One
K. Lyra T.S.V.	Lier	Antwerp	11th
K.F.C. Nijlen	Nijlen	Antwerp	2nd of Antwerp Division One^{1}
K.F.C. Sint-Lenaarts	Brecht	Antwerp	9th
Spouwen-Mopertingen	Bilzen	Limburg	7th
K.V.V. Thes Sport Tessenderlo	Tessenderlo	Limburg	1st of Limbourg Division One
K.V. Turnhout	Turnhout	Antwerp	18th of third division B
K.V.V. Vosselaar	Vosselaar	Antwerp	13th
K.V.K. Wellen	Wellen	Limburg	8th
K.O.S.C. Wijgmaal	Wijgmaal	Flemish Brabant	6th of promotion B
K.F.C. Zwarte Leeuw	Rijkevorsel	Antwerp	6th

K.F.C. Nijlen won the Antwerp Division One promotion play-off.

== See also ==
- Belgian Third Division
- Belgian Fourth Division
- Belgian Provincial leagues
- Belgian football league system
