= Belgian Fourth Division B =

The Belgian Fourth Division B was one of the four leagues at the fourth level of the Belgian football league system, the other ones being the Belgian Fourth Division A, C and D. This division existed from the 1952–53 to 2015–16 seasons and was played every year with 16 clubs in each league. The league was replaced by Belgian Second Amateur Division.

== The final clubs ==
Club	Municipality	Province	Finishing position 2014–15 season
R. Géants Athois	Ath	Hainaut	16th of third division A
K.A.C. Betekom	Betekom	Flemish Brabant	1st of Brabant Division One
R. Francs Borains	Boussu	Hainaut	2nd
FC Ganshoren	Ganshoren	Brussels	12th
Léopold FC	Uccle	Brussels	8th
RWDM47	Sint-Jans-Molenbeek	Brussels	None (newly formed)^{1}
R.O.C. de Charleroi-Marchienne	Montignies-sur-Sambre	Hainaut	1st of Hainaut Division One
Racing Charleroi Couillet Fleurus	Charleroi	Hainaut	4th of Hainaut Division One^{2}
R. Châtelet S.C.	Châtelet	Hainaut	5th
K.F.C. Duffel	Duffel	Antwerp	5th of promotion C
K.S.K. Halle	Halle	Flemish Brabant	5th of Brabant Division One^{3}
R.F.C. Tournai	Tournai	Hainaut	18th of third division A
R.U.S. Rebecquoise	Rebecq	Walloon Brabant	4th
K. Olympia Voetbalclub Sterrebeek	Sterrebeek	Flemish Brabant	10th
R.R.C. Waterloo	Waterloo	Walloon Brabant	9th
K. Wolvertem S.C.	Wolvertem	Flemish Brabant	11th

— RWDM's number 5479 was previously held by K. Standaard Wetteren which merged with R.R.C. Wetteren to become R.F.C. Wetteren.
— R. Charleroi CF won the second round of the Belgian interprovincial play-off
— K.S.K. Halle won the Brabant Division One play-off

== See also ==
- Belgian Third Division
- Belgian Fourth Division
- Belgian Provincial leagues
- Belgian football league system
