= Belgian Fourth Division D =

The Belgian Fourth Division D (Dutch: Vierde Klasse) was one of the four leagues at the fourth level of the Belgian football league system, the other ones being the Belgian Fourth Division A, B and C. This division existed from the 1952–53 to 2015–16 seasons and was played every year with 16 clubs in each league. The league was replaced by the Belgian Second Amateur Division.

The season was divided into three periods of ten matches to make a total of 30 games. The team with the most points was promoted to the Belgian Third Division as champion. The winners of each period (assuming they met the criteria) entered the playoffs (Eindronde in Dutch) with the other nine teams from Promotion A, B and C. The 6 winners went to the second round with the sides who finished 14th in the Third Division. The 4 winners qualified for the final and the 2 winning teams played in the Third Division the following season.

Teams who finished 16th, 15th and 14th were relegated to the Belgian Provincial Leagues. The 13th placed team had to playoff in order to stay in the division.

== The final clubs ==
Club	Municipality	Province	Finishing position 2014–15 season
F.C. Jeunesse Lorraine Arlonaise	Arlon	Luxembourg	8th
R. Aywaille F.C.	Aywaille	Liège	7th
R.E. Bertrigeoise	Bertrix	Luxembourg	11th
R.D.C. de Cointe-Liège	Liège	Liège	1st in Liège Division One
R.E.S. Couvin-Mariembourg	Couvin	Namur	9th
U.S. Givry	Bertogne	Luxembourg	6th
R.U.S. Loyers	Namur	Namur	1st in Namur Division One
Patro Lensois	Hannut	Liège	4th in Liège Division One^{1}
R.R.C. Longlier	Neufchâteau	Luxembourg	1st in Luxembourg Division One
R.F.C. de Meux	La Bruyère	Namur	5th
UR Namur	Namur	Namur	10th
FC Richelle United	Visé	Liège	2nd in Liège Division One^{2}
Solières Sport	Huy	Liège	3rd
R.J.S. Taminoise	Sambreville	Namur	12th
R.C.S. de Verlaine	Verlaine	Liège	3rd in Liège Division One^{3}
Royal Stade Waremmien F.C.	Waremme	Liège	2nd

— Promoted to replace R.C.S. Verviétois.
— FC Richelle United finished first of the Liège Division One play-off, qualifying for the Belgian interprovincial play-off, which it won.
— Promoted to replace C.S. Visé.

== See also ==
- Belgian Third Division
- Belgian Fourth Division
- Belgian Provincial leagues
- Belgian football league system
