= Belgian Fourth Division A =

The Belgian Fourth Division A was one of the four leagues at the fourth level of the Belgian football league system, the others being the Belgian Fourth Division B, C and D. This division existed from the 1952-53 to 2015-16 seasons and was played every year with 16 clubs in each league. The league was replaced by Belgian Second Amateur Division.

== The final clubs ==
Club	Municipality	Province	Finishing position 2014–15 season
K.S.V. White Star Adinkerke	Adinkerke	West Flanders	1st of West Flanders Division One
S.K. Berlare	Berlare	East Flanders	11th
SVV Damme	Damme	West Flanders	5th of West Flanders Division One^{1}
S.C. Dikkelvenne	Dikkelvenne	East Flanders	1st of East Flanders Division One
S.K. Eernegem	Eernegem	West Flanders	12th
Sporting West Harelbeke	Harelbeke	West Flanders	3rd
OMS Ingelmunster	Ingelmunster	West Flanders	4th
R. Knokke FC	Knokke	West Flanders	7th
K.S.C. Toekomst Menen	Menen	West Flanders	8th
K.V.K. Ninove	Ninove	East Flanders	2nd of East Flanders Division One
K.S.K. Ronse	Ronse	East Flanders	6th
Sporting Sint-Gillis Waas	Sint-Gillis-Waas	East Flanders	10th
FC Pepingen	Pepingen	Flemish Brabant	7th
K.V.K. Westhoek	Ypres	West Flanders	5th
R.F.C. Wetteren	Wetteren	East Flanders	13th
K.F.C. Eendracht Zele	Zele	East Flanders	17th of third division A

— S.V.V. Damme admitted to fill vacancy after R.A.E.C. Mons' bankruptcy on winning repêchage play-offs.

== See also ==
- Belgian Third Division
- Belgian Fourth Division
- Belgian Provincial leagues
- Belgian football league system
