= Belgian football league system =

The Belgian football league system is a series of interconnected leagues for club football in Belgium.

== Men's system ==
The league system underwent restructuring which was approved by the Royal Belgian Football Association. One important step was the introduction of a national fifth level for the first time. Its implementation took effect as of the 2016–17 season. Changes since 2016:

- The Belgian Second Division, founded in 1909, was replaced by the Proximus League in 2016.
- From the 2020–21 season on:
  - the third, fourth and fifth level were renamed due to the negative connotation of the word Amateur. The First Amateur Division, Second Amateur Division and Third Amateur Division were rebranded respectively as National Division 1, Division 2 and Division 3.
  - the First Division B no longer involved all eight teams playing two separate round-robin competitions with the two winners playing off for the title, but rather involved all teams playing each other four times.
- Due to the COVID-19 pandemic, the Belgian First Division A was expanded temporarily from 16 to 18 teams.
- From the 2022–23 season, the two highest leagues were renamed, from First Division A and First Division B to Pro League and Challenger Pro League respectively. Furthermore, the Challenger Pro League expanded to 12 teams and now included as well four U23-teams. Also in the National Division 1 and Division 2 U23 teams were added.
- The Pro League again reverted to 16 teams from the 2023–24 season, with a new playoff system similar to the pre-COVID period, but most importantly now with two teams directly relegating and a third one playing a play-off to avoid it. The Challenger Pro League expands to 16 teams.
- From the 2024–25 season, the highest non-professional level (Belgian National Division 1) was split into two separate divisions, one for VV and ACFF each, with the number of clubs expanding from 18 to 28 (16 VV + 12 ACFF).
- During the 2025-26 season, it was decided that at least four U23 must always play in the Challenger Pro League (second tier). One season later, this rule was determined to be illegal. A solution is yet to be found.
- In April 2026, ACFF was renamed FFA.
- From 2026–27 season, the Belgian Pro League will again expand to 18 teams, without play-offs. This decision was made in conjunction with the four U23 teams in second tier rule, while the expansion to 18 will go through, the U23 rule will need to be abolished. As a result the expansion to 18 teams in the top tier is being legally challenged (as of April 2026).
- From the 2027-28 season, the French-speaking amateur divisions will change, with the Division 2 splitting into two groups of 12, and the Division 3 splitting into three groups of 12. All with playoffs after a regular season.

Level	League(s)/Division(s)	
	Professional Leagues	
1	Belgian Pro League; 18 clubs ↓ 2 relegations	
2	Challenger Pro League; 15 clubs ↑ 2 promotions ↓ 2 relegations	
	Semi-/Non-Professional Leagues	
3	Belgian Division 1	
3	Flemish Division 1 VV; 16 clubs ↑ 1 Promotion spot, ↓ 2 Relegation spots	Walloon Division 1 FFA; 12 clubs ↑ 1 Promotion spot, ↓ 3 Relegation spots
4	Belgian Division 2	
4	Flemish Division 2 VV; 32 clubs divided in 2 series of 16 ↑ 2 Promotion spots, ↓ 4 Relegation spots	Walloon Division 2 FFA; 18 clubs (24 clubs divided in 2 series of 12 from 2027–28) ↑ 1 Promotion spot, ↓ 3 Relegation spots
5	Belgian Division 3	
5	Flemish Division 3 VV; 32 clubs divided in 2 series of 16 ↑ 4 Promotion spots, ↓ 6 Relegation spots	Walloon Division 3 FFA; 33 clubs divided in 2 series, one of 16 and one of 17 (36 clubs divided in 3 series of 12 from 2027–28) ↑ 4 Promotion spots, ↓ 6 Relegation spots
	Amateur Leagues	
6	(All divisions run in parallel); Belgian Provincial Leagues, First Level; Eerste Provinciale Antwerpen – 16 clubs Eerste Provinciale Brabant (Flemish) – 16 clubs Première Provinciale Brabant (Francophone) – 16 clubs Première Provinciale Hainaut – 16 clubs Première Provinciale Liège – 18 clubs Eerste Provinciale Limburg – 16 clubs Première Provinciale Luxembourg – 14 clubs Première Provinciale Namur – 16 clubs Eerste Provinciale Oost-Vlaanderen – 16 clubs Eerste Provinciale West-Vlaanderen – 16 clubs	
7	(All divisions run in parallel); Belgian Provincial Leagues, Second Level; Tweede Provinciale Antwerpen – 32 clubs divided in 2 series of 16; Tweede Provinciale Brabant (Flemish) – 32 clubs divided in 2 series of 16; Deuxième Provinciale Brabant (Francophone) – 32 clubs divided in 2 series of 16; Deuxième Provinciale Hainaut – 48 clubs divided in 3 series of 16; Deuxième Provinciale Liège – 46 clubs divided in 3 series; 2 of 15 teams and 1 of 16 teams Tweede Provinciale Limburg – 32 clubs divided in 2 series of 16; Deuxième Provinciale Luxembourg – 42 clubs divided in 3 series of 14; Deuxième Provinciale Namur – 32 clubs divided in 2 series of 16; Tweede Provinciale Oost-Vlaanderen – 48 clubs divided in 3 series of 16; Tweede Provinciale West-Vlaanderen – 32 clubs divided in 2 series of 16	
8	(All divisions run in parallel); Belgian Provincial Leagues, Third Level; Derde Provinciale Antwerpen – 48 clubs divided in 3 series of 16; Derde Provinciale Brabant (Flemish) – 32 clubs divided in 2 series of 16; Troisième Provinciale Brabant (Francophone) – 32 clubs divided in 2 series of 16; Troisième Provinciale Hainaut – 64 clubs divided in 4 series of 16; Troisième Provinciale Liège – 64 clubs divided in 4 series of 16; Derde Provinciale Limburg – 48 clubs divided in 3 series of 16; Troisième Provinciale Luxembourg – 72 clubs divided in 6 series; 4 of 14 teams and 2 of 13 teams Troisième Provinciale Namur – 48 clubs divided in 3 series of 16; Derde Provinciale Oost-Vlaanderen – 80 clubs divided in 5 series of 16; Derde Provinciale West-Vlaanderen – 48 clubs divided in 3 series of 16	
9	(All divisions run in parallel); Belgian Provincial Leagues, Fourth Level; Vierde Provinciale Antwerpen – 82 clubs divided in 5 series; 3 of 16 teams and 2 of 17 teams Vierde Provinciale Brabant (Flemish) – 96 clubs divided in 6 series of 16; Quatrième Provinciale Hainaut – 115 clubs divided in 8 series; 5 of 14 teams and 3 of 15 teams Quatrième Provinciale Liège – 112 clubs divided in 8 series; 3 of 13 teams, 2 of 14 teams and 3 of 15 teams Vierde Provinciale Limburg – 52 clubs divided in 8 series; 2 of 17 teams and 1 of 18 teams Quatrième Provinciale Namur – 78 clubs divided in 6 series of 13; Vierde Provinciale Oost-Vlaanderen – 72 clubs divided in 5 series; 3 of 16 teams and 2 of 17 teams Vierde Provinciale West-Vlaanderen – 52 clubs divided in 3 series; 1 of 16 teams and 2 of 18 teams	

=== Men's league historical timeline ===
The timeline below lists the evolution of the men's tiers and leagues related to the Belgian FA since 1895. The provincial leagues often span multiple tiers.

== Women's system ==
From 2012/13 to 2014/15 the top teams played in the BeNe League, a joint league with clubs from the Netherlands. The Super League was created in 2015.

Level	League(s)/Division(s)
1	Super League; 8 clubs
2	First Division; 14 clubs
3	Second Division (Nationwide league) (3×12)36 clubs
4+	Provincial leagues
