= Belgian Fourth Division =

- Founded: 1952
- Folded: 2016
- Country: Belgium
- Divisions: Belgian Fourth Division A Belgian Fourth Division B Belgian Fourth Division C Belgian Fourth Division D
- Number of clubs: 64 (until 2015–16)
- Level on pyramid: 4
- Promotion to: Belgian Third Division
- Relegation to: Belgian Provincial leagues
- Domestic cup: Belgian Cup
- Last champions: R.C. Hades (2015–16)

The Belgian Fourth Division was the lowest nationwide division in Belgian football. The division was split into four separate leagues, A, B, C and D. The team with the most points in the four leagues together was declared the overall winner. If several league winners had the same number of points, the one with the most wins was declared champion, or if that was still tied, then the one with the best goal average was declared champion. Finally, if two teams were still equal, a single match was played on a neutral ground to determine the team to be added to the palmares. For 2016–17 the Belgian Fourth Division was replaced by the Belgian Third Amateur Division.

== The competition ==
The competition consisted of the regular season of 30 matchdays and the promotion playoff of three matchdays.

=== The regular season ===
The four champions qualified directly for the Belgian Third Division. Each league was split into three periods (of 10 matchdays each) which determined the twelve qualifiers for the promotion playoff. If a team needed to be replaced, the best-placed team at the end of the regular season which had not yet qualified for the playoff took the free spot. A winner of a period could be replaced because:

- it had won more than one period;
- the champion had won at least one period;
- it finished in 13th place;
- it was relegated to the level below.

The bottom three teams in each league were relegated to the provincial leagues while the 13th-placed teams entered the interprovincial playoff.

As a part of changes in the Belgian league system that were implemented in 2016, the Belgian Fourth Division was replaced by the Belgian Third Amateur Division.

=== Fourth Division playoff ===
The Fourth Division playoff was played in three rounds. The first round consisted of six matches of one leg opposing the twelve qualifiers from the Fourth Division. Two teams from the third division (the two 14th-placed teams) entered the playoff in the second round that consisted of two groups of two matches. The third division teams were placed in different groups (with three teams from the first round in each group). The two winners of each group played the group final that qualified two teams for the third division. The groups were constructed to ensure that the two teams from the third division were not able to meet each other in the playoff. The matches were played in one leg at the venue of the first drawn team. When a match ended in a draw, extra time of two periods of 15 minutes was played followed by a penalty shootout if the score remained tied.

== Past winners ==
Year	Champion	Year	Champion	Year	Champion	Year	Champion
1953	K. Willebroekse S.V.	1973	F.C. Denderleeuw	1993	K.F.C. Herentals	2013	R. Sprimont Comblain Sport
1954	R.R.F.C. Montegnée	1974	K. Stade Leuven	1994	K.F.C. Tielen	2014	FC Gullegem
1955	F.C. Waaslandia Burcht	1975	R.F.C. Sérésien	1995	R.E.S.C. Virton	2015	R. Sprimont Comblain Sport
1956	K.F.C. Eeklo	1976	Wavre Sports	1996	K.F.C. Strombeek	2016	R.C. Hades
1957	R.C.S. Brainois	1977	K.R.C. Harelbeke	1997	U.R. Namur		
1958	R.U.S. Tournaisienne	1978	R.C.S. La Forestoise	1998	K.S.K. Kermt		
1959	Union Basse-Sambre-Auvelais	1979	K. Stade Leuven	1999	R. Francs Borains		
1960	R. Entente Sportive Jamboise	1980	Wallonia Association Namur	2000	F.C. Zwarte Duivels Oud-Heverlee		
1961	R.A.E.C. Mons	1981	R. Union Hutoise F.C.	2001	R. Jet Wavre		
1962	F.C. Vigor Hamme	1982	K.S.V. Bornem	2002	R.E. Dison-Verviers		
1963	S.K. Beveren-Waas	1983	Royale Union	2003	K.S.K. Kermt-Hasselt		
1964	Wavre Sports	1984	K.V.K. Tienen	2004	Verbroedering Denderhoutem		
1965	K. White Star Club Lauwe	1985	V.C. Westerlo	2005	R.C.S. Verviétois		
1966	K.S.C. Eendracht Aalst	1986	O.C. Charleroi	2006	K.S.V. Oudenaarde		
1967	R.A. Marchiennoise des Sports	1987	F.C. Heist Sportief	2007	R.R.C. Hamoir		
1968	R.C.S. La Forestoise	1988	Eendracht Wervik	2008	U.R.S. du Centre		
1969	K.A.S. Eupen	1989	K.V. Ourodenberg-Aarschot	2009	F.C. Bleid		
1970	K.S.K. Tongeren	1990	R.E. Mouscron	2010	R. Entente Bertrigeoise		
1971	Wavre Sports	1991	V.V. Overpelt-Fabriek	2011	K. Patro Eisden Maasmechelen		
1972	K.V. Kortrijk	1992	K. Tubantia Borgerhout V.K.	2012	R.U. Wallonne Ciney		

== See also ==
- Belgian Fourth Division A
- Belgian Fourth Division B
- Belgian Fourth Division C
- Belgian Fourth Division D
