= 2001 Belgian Super Cup =

2001 Belgian Supercup
Westerlo	Anderlecht
1	4
- Date: 4 August 2001
- Venue: Het Kuipje, Westerlo
- Referee: Paul Allaerts
- Attendance: 5,000

The 2001 Belgian Supercup was a football match between the winners of the previous season's 2000–01 Belgian First Division and 2000–01 Belgian Cup competitions. The match was contested by cup winners Westerlo and league champions Anderlecht on 4 August 2001 at the ground of the cup winners Westerlo, Het Kuipje.

In an animated match, the home team took an early lead through Francis Severeyns and looked on their way to an easy win as after twenty minutes played Anderlecht was down to ten men following a red card for Aruna Dindane. In the second half however, Anderlecht managed to score four goals to win the cup despite being a man down, including a hattrick by Seol Ki-hyeon.

== Details ==
4 August 2001

Westerlo	1–4	Anderlecht
Severeyns 18'	Report	Hendrikx 52'; Seol 67', 71', 78'

Het Kuipje, Westerlo
Attendance: 5,000
Referee: Paul Allaerts

Westerlo	Anderlecht

GK	1	(Belgium) Bart Deelkens
RB	6	(Belgium) Sidney Lammens	(substituted off) 73'
CB	15	(Belgium) Sadio Ba	(substituted off) 67'
CB	16	(Belgium) Frank Machiels (c)
LB	8	(Belgium) Björn De Coninck
RM	3	(Belgium) Marc Schaessens
CM	17	(Belgium) Sammy Van den Bossche
CM	5	(Belgium) Yves Serneels
LM	20	(Belgium) Bart Willemsen	(substituted off) 74'
RF	11	(Belgium) Francis Severeyns
LF	18	(Belgium) Jef Delen	(substituted off) 67'
Substitutes:
CF	14	(Belgium) Björn Smits	(substituted on) 73'
CF	22	(Belgium) Kevin Vandenbergh	(substituted on) 67'
RF	9	(Bosnia and Herzegovina) Vedran Pelić	(substituted on) 74'
CB	7	(Belgium) Frank Dauwen	(substituted on) 67'
Manager:
(Belgium) Jan Ceulemans

GK	1	(Belgium) Filip De Wilde
RB	16	(Belgium) Bertrand Crasson		(substituted off) 46'
CB	6	(Belgium) Joris Van Hout	Booked
CB	5	(Belgium) Glen De Boeck (c)	Booked
LB	2	(Federal Republic of Yugoslavia) Aleksandar Ilić
CM	22	(Ukraine) Oleg Yashchuk		(substituted off) 46'
CM	15	(Albania) Besnik Hasi
AM	4	(Belgium) Yves Vanderhaeghe
RW	14	(Belgium) Marc Hendrikx		(substituted off) 88'
CF	19	(Croatia) Ivica Mornar		(substituted off) 46'
RF	26	(Ivory Coast) Aruna Dindane	(red card) 21'
Substitutes:
RM	21	(Belgium) Emmanuel Pirard		(substituted on) 46'
CF	20	(Belgium) Gilles De Bilde		(substituted on) 46'
LW	18	(South Korea) Seol Ki-hyeon		(substituted on) 46'
CF	9	(Nigeria) Ode Thompson		(substituted on) 88'
Manager:
(Belgium) Aimé Anthuenis

== See also ==
- 2001–02 Belgian First Division
- 2001–02 Belgian Cup
