= 2000 Belgian Cup final =

- Event: 1999–2000 Belgian Cup
Genk	Standard Liège
4	1
- Date: 14 May 2000
- Venue: King Baudouin Stadium, Brussels
- Referee: Michel Piraux
- Attendance: 47,000

The 2000 Belgian Cup final, took place on 14 May 2000 between Genk and Standard Liège. It was the 45th Belgian Cup final and was won by Genk, coming back from an early goal by Frédéric Pierre to win 4-1.

== Route to the final ==
Genk				Standard Liège
Opponent	Result	Legs	Round	Opponent	Result	Legs
Tongeren (III)	3–0	3–0 home	Sixth round	Harelbeke	3–2	3–2 home
Ingelmunster (II)	8–1	8–1 home	Seventh round	Westerlo	2–1	2–1 home
Gent	3–1	3–1 home	Quarter-finals	Mons (III)	1–0	1–0 home
Sint-Truiden	1–0	0–0 home, 1–0 away	Semi-finals	Lierse	2–1	2–1 home; 0–0 away

== Match ==
=== Details ===
14 May 2000
16:00 CEST

Genk	4–1	Standard Liège
Ban 20'; Guðjónsson 54', 76'; Hasi 81'		Pierre 1'

King Baudouin Stadium, Brussels
Attendance: 47,000
Referee: Michel Piraux

Genk	Standard Liège

GK	1	(Hungary) István Brockhauser
RB	5	(Belgium) Wilfried Delbroek
CB	3	(Belgium) Daniel Kimoni
CB	13	(Belgium) Marc Vangronsveld
LB	12	(Belgium) Marc Hendrikx	(yellow card) 13'
RM	7	(Kenya) Mike Origi
CM	10	(Iceland) Þórður Guðjónsson
CM	8	(Albania) Besnik Hasi		(substituted off) 88'
CM	15	(Australia) Josip Skoko
LM	20	(Belgium) Koen Daerden
ST	14	(Croatia) Zoran Ban		(substituted off) 65'
Substitutes:
CB	6	(Belgium) Domenico Olivieri		(substituted on) 88'
ST	18	(Hungary) Ferenc Horváth		(substituted on) 65'
Manager:
(Netherlands) Johan Boskamp

GK	1	(Croatia) Vedran Runje
RB	7	(Belgium) David Brocken
CB	3	(Belgium) Daniel Van Buyten
CB	23	(Romania) Liviu Ciobotariu
LB	11	(Portugal) Dimas	(yellow card) 50'
RM	8	(Belgium) Frédéric Pierre
CM	20	(Belgium) Laurent Wuillot	(yellow card) 79'
CM	2	(Belgium) Didier Ernst (c)
LM	24	(Romania) Tibor Selymes	(yellow card) 17'	(substituted off) 46'
CF	9	(Belgium) Michaël Goossens		(substituted off) 69'
CF	19	(Croatia) Ivica Mornar	(yellow card) 15'
Substitutes:
CF	22	(Egypt) Mohamed El Yamani		(substituted on) 69'
CB	4	(Ghana) George Blay		(substituted on) 58'
CF	17	(Democratic Republic of the Congo) Ali Lukunku		(substituted on) 46' (substituted off) 58'
Manager:
(Croatia) Tomislav Ivić

Match rules

- 90 minutes.
- 30 minutes of extra time if necessary.
- Penalty shoot-out if scores still level.
- Seven named substitutes.
- Maximum of three substitutions.
