= Glen De Boeck =

Belgian football player and manager (1971–2025)

- De Boeck with Anderlecht in 2001

Personal information
- Date of birth: 22 August 1971
- Place of birth: Boom, Belgium
- Date of death: 7 December 2025 (aged 54)
- Place of death: Antwerp, Belgium
- Height: 1.89 m (6 ft 2 in)
- Position: Defender

Youth career
- 1979–1990: FC Boom

Senior career*
| Years | Team | Apps | (Gls) |
| 1990–1992 | FC Boom | 35 | (1) |
| 1992–1995 | Mechelen | 93 | (5) |
| 1995–2005 | Anderlecht | 207 | (15) |
| Total | | 335 | (20) |

International career
| 1993–2002 | Belgium | 36 | (1) |

Managerial career
- 2005–2007: Anderlecht (assistant manager)
- 2007–2010: Cercle Brugge
- 2010: Germinal Beerschot
- 2011: VVV-Venlo
- 2012–2013: Waasland-Beveren
- 2016: Mouscron-Péruwelz
- 2017–2018: KV Kortrijk
- 2019: Lokeren
- 2023: KV Kortrijk
- * Club domestic league appearances and goals

Glen De Boeck (Dutch pronunciation: [ˈɣlɛn də ˈbuk]) (22 August 1971 – 7 December 2025) was a Belgian football manager and player. He was most recently in charge of Kortrijk in the Belgian Pro League after previously managing Cercle Brugge and Waasland-Beveren in the top flight, and Lokeren in the Belgian First Division B. During his career, he played as a central defender, mostly on the books of Anderlecht, with whom he won several league titles, and later was an assistant coach. De Boeck was part of the Belgian squad at the 1998 and 2002 World Cups.

== Club career ==
De Boeck was born in Boom. He was trained as a player at the local FC Boom, where he made his debut at the age of 19 and immediately promoted with the team to the Belgian first division. After that promotion, he moved to KV Mechelen, where he would play 109 matches in three seasons.

In the summer of 1995, he moved to Anderlecht. In the late 1990s, he was criticized by pundits, who claimed he was not good enough for Anderlecht. He eventually increased his technical performances to become one of the best defenders in the Belgian First Division in the early 2000s.

Manager Aimé Antheunis was convinced of his intelligence and leadership abilities and appointed him captain of the team in 2001. With Anderlecht, he would ultimately win three national championships, the final one in 2004.

In February 2005, De Boeck decided to end his career due to another heavy knee injury. By then, Anderlecht had found a new articulate defender with leadership qualities, Vincent Kompany.

== Style of play ==
De Boeck was a rather static libero. His nickname among journalists was “the cathedral”. However, he was also intelligent, tactically and organizationally strong, and had good positional play.

== International career ==
De Boeck made his international debut with Belgium on 6 October 1993, against Gabon (a friendly), going on to represent his country at two World Cups, with three appearances combined. Although he had become a regular in the squad, he had to miss two matches at the 2002 World Cup in Japan and South Korea due to injuries. In total, he would play 36 matches for Belgium.

== Coaching career ==
De Boeck was directly snapped up by his last club Anderlecht to become an assistant manager, together with Daniel Renders.

On 23 April 2007, it was revealed that De Boeck would become manager of first division side Cercle Brugge at the end of the 2006–07 season. He succeeded Harm Van Veldhoven, who had already chosen to leave for Germinal Beerschot. On 1 February 2008, the board of directors at Cercle declared De Boeck had signed a new contract until 2011, as he also became the football section's technical director, being made responsible for the further development of the football team. In March 2009, De Boeck denied K.R.C. Genk in signing him as their new coach. Instead he chose to stay with his current club Cercle Brugge. He left Cercle in June 2010 and was named the manager of Germinal Beerschot who were looking for a successor to Jos Daerden who left to become an assistant coach at Dutch club Twente.

On 30 November 2010, after continuous bad results and disagreements on the management board, he was fired as coach from Germinal Beerschot.

At the start of the 2011–12 season De Boeck was appointed the new manager of VVV-Venlo, but halfway through the season on 6 December 2011, following a 7–0 defeat to Heracles Almelo, he resigned as manager of VVV-Venlo. In November 2012 he signed for Waasland-Beveren, but was released one year later.

After spells at Mouscron-Péruwelz, Kortrijk and Lokeren, De Boeck became a prominent expert on Belgian television before being re-appointed Kortrijk coach on 26 September 2023 in place of Edward Still, with the club lying bottom of the Belgian Pro League, without a win in their first eight games in the season.

== Death ==
De Boeck died in Antwerp on 7 December 2025, at the age of 54. He had suffered a massive brain hemorrhage at home on 6 December, after which he went into a deep coma, from which he did not recover. The following weekend, an impressive tribute was paid in various Belgian stadiums for the suddenly deceased former international.

== Career statistics ==
=== Club ===
Appearances and goals by club, season and competition
| Club | Season | League | | | National cup (Note: Includes Belgian Cup) | | Other (Note: Includes Belgian League Cup, Belgian Super Cup) | | Europe | | Total | |
| Club | Season | Division | Apps | Goals | Apps | Goals | Apps | Goals | Apps | Goals | Apps | Goals |
|---|---|---|---|---|---|---|---|---|---|---|---|---|
| Boom | 1990–91 | Belgian Second Division | 8 | 0 | 1 | 0 | – | | – | | 9 | 0 |
| Boom | 1991–92 | Belgian Second Division | 27 | 1 | 1 | 0 | – | | – | | 28 | 1 |
| Boom | Total | | 35 | 1 | 2 | 0 | – | | – | | 37 | 1 |
| KV Mechelen | 1992–93 | Belgian First Division | 33 | 3 | 2 | 1 | – | | 4 (Note: Appearances in UEFA Cup) | 1 | 39 | 5 |
| KV Mechelen | 1993–94 | Belgian First Division | 32 | 1 | 1 | 0 | – | | 6 | 1 | 39 | 2 |
| KV Mechelen | 1994–95 | Belgian First Division | 28 | 0 | 3 | 0 | – | | – | | 31 | 0 |
| KV Mechelen | Total | | 93 | 4 | 6 | 1 | – | | 10 | 2 | 109 | 7 |
| Anderlecht | 1995–96 | Belgian First Division | 21 | 2 | 3 | 1 | – | | 0 (Note: UEFA Champions League qualification) | 0 | 24 | 3 |
| Anderlecht | 1996–97 | Belgian First Division | 9 | 0 | 2 | 0 | – | | 3 | 0 | 14 | 0 |
| Anderlecht | 1997–98 | Belgian First Division | 30 | 4 | 1 | 0 | 1 (Note: Appearances in Belgian League Cup) | 0 | 4 | 1 | 36 | 5 |
| Anderlecht | 1998–99 | Belgian First Division | 26 | 2 | 1 | 0 | – | | 4 | 1 | 31 | 3 |
| Anderlecht | 1999–2000 | Belgian First Division | 30 | 1 | 0 | 0 | 1 | 0 | 5 | 0 | 36 | 1 |
| Anderlecht | 2000–01 | Belgian First Division | 26 | 0 | 3 | 0 | 1 (Note: Appearances in Belgian Super Cup) | 0 | 14 (Note: Appearances in UEFA Champions League) | 0 | 44 | 0 |
| Anderlecht | 2001–02 | Belgian First Division | 22 | 1 | 1 | 0 | 1 | 0 | 9 | 4 | 33 | 5 |
| Anderlecht | 2002–03 | Belgian First Division | 24 | 3 | 4 | 0 | – | | 8 | 0 | 36 | 3 |
| Anderlecht | 2003–04 | Belgian First Division | 12 | 1 | 2 | 1 | – | | 2 | 0 | 16 | 2 |
| Anderlecht | 2004–05 | Belgian First Division | 7 | 1 | 1 | 0 | – | | 3 | 0 | 11 | 1 |
| Anderlecht | Total | | 207 | 15 | 18 | 2 | 4 | 0 | 52 | 6 | 281 | 23 |
| Career total | | | 335 | 20 | 26 | 3 | 4 | 0 | 62 | 8 | 427 | 31 |

=== International ===
Appearances and goals by national team and year
| National team | Year | Apps | Goals |
|---|---|---|---|
| Belgium | 1993 | 1 | 0 |
| Belgium | 1995 | 2 | 0 |
| Belgium | 1997 | 1 | 0 |
| Belgium | 1998 | 8 | 0 |
| Belgium | 1999 | 11 | 0 |
| Belgium | 2001 | 6 | 0 |
| Belgium | 2002 | 7 | 1 |
| Total | | 36 | 1 |

List of international goals scored by Glen De Boeck
| No. | Date | Venue | Opponent | Score | Result | Competition |
|---|---|---|---|---|---|---|
| 1 | 18 May 2002 | Parc des Princes, Paris | France | 1–0 | 2–1 | Friendly |

== Honours ==
=== Player ===
Anderlecht

- Belgian First Division: 1999–00, 2000–01, 2003–04
- Belgian Cup: runners-up 1996–97
- Belgian Super Cup: 2000, 2001
- Belgian League Cup: 2000
- Belgian Sports Team of the Year: 2000
- Jules Pappaert Cup: 2000, 2001

Belgium

- FIFA Fair Play Trophy: 2002 World Cup

=== Manager ===
Cercle Brugge

- Belgian Cup: runners-up 2009–10
