= 2001 Belgian Cup final =

- Event: 2000–01 Belgian Cup
Westerlo	Lommel
1	0
- Date: 27 May 2001
- Venue: King Baudouin Stadium, Brussels
- Referee: Eric Romain
- Attendance: 20 000
- Weather: clear

The 2001 Belgian Cup final, took place on 27 May 2001 between Westerlo and second division champions Lommel. It was the 46th Belgian Cup final and was won by Westerlo. This was the first time since Tongeren in 1974 that a team from outside the top division had made it into the final.

== Route to the final ==
Westerlo				Lommel
Opponent	Result	Legs	Round	Opponent	Result	Legs
Denderleeuw (II)	1–0	1–0 home	Sixth round	Aalst	2–0	2–0 away
Beveren	3–1 (a.e.t.)	3–1 home (a.e.t.)	Seventh round	La Louvière	3–0	3–0 home
Sint-Truiden	1–0	1–0 home	Quarter-finals	Lokeren	3–1	3–1 home
Germinal Beerschot	4–2	2–1 away, 2–1 home	Semi-finals	Genk	3–2	2–1 home; 1–1 away

== Match ==
=== Details ===
27 May 2001
16:15 CEST

Westerlo	1–0	Lommel
Delen 22'

King Baudouin Stadium, Brussels
Referee: Eric Romain

Westerlo	Lommel

GK	1	(Belgium) Bart Deelkens
RB	6	(Belgium) Sidney Lammens
CB	15	(Belgium) Sadio Ba
CB	16	(Belgium) Frank Machiels
LB	8	(Belgium) Björn De Coninck
RM	3	(Belgium) Marc Schaessens		(substituted off) 66'
CM	7	(Belgium) Rudy Janssens (c)
CM	20	(Belgium) Bart Willemsen	Booked	(substituted off) 74'
CM	11	(Czech Republic) Lukáš Zelenka
LM	18	(Belgium) Jef Delen
CF	9	(Bosnia and Herzegovina) Vedran Pelić	Booked	(substituted off) 85'
Substitutes:
CM	12	(Belgium) Dirk Thoelen		(substituted on) 74'
CF	5	(Belgium) Ives Serneels		(substituted on) 85'
CM	23	(Federal Republic of Yugoslavia) Dalibor Mitrović		(substituted on) 66'
Manager:
(Belgium) Jan Ceulemans

GK	1	(Belgium) Gert Davidts
RB	15	(Belgium) Kris Vincken	Booked
CB	2	(Belgium) Daniël Nassen
CB	4	(Belgium) Michel Noben	Booked
LB	5	(Belgium) Didier Segers		(substituted off) 71'
RM	7	(Czech Republic) Richard Culek
CM	14	(Belgium) Wim Mennes
CM	22	(Hungary) Zsolt Bárányos
LM	11	(Belgium) Dieter Dekelver
CF	10	(Netherlands) Twan Scheepers	Booked
CF	9	(Poland) Mirosław Waligóra
Substitutes:
CB	6	(Belgium) Daniël Scavone	Sent off (straight red)	(substituted on) 71'
Manager:
(Netherlands) Harm van Veldhoven

Match rules

- 90 minutes.
- 30 minutes of extra time if necessary.
- Penalty shoot-out if scores still level.
- Seven named substitutes.
- Maximum of three substitutions.
