= Besnik Hasi =

Kosovar football coach and former player

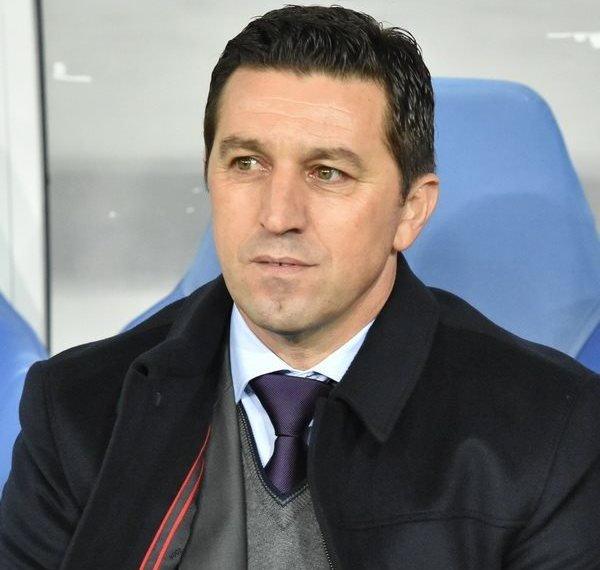
- Hasi with Anderlecht in 2016

Personal information
- Date of birth: 29 December 1971 (age 54)
- Place of birth: Djakovica, SR Serbia, SFR Yugoslavia (present-day Kosovo)
- Height: 1.75 m (5 ft 9 in)
- Positions: Centre-back; defensive midfielder

Team information
- Current team: Amedspor (head coach)

Youth career
- Vëllaznimi

Senior career*
Years	Team	Apps	(Gls)
1988–1990	Liria Prizren	46	(7)
1990–1991	Zagreb	5	(1)
1991–1992	Prishtina	1	(0)
1993–1994	Samobor		
1994–1997	Genk	79	(18)
1997–1998	1860 Munich	7	(0)
1998–2000	Genk	61	(3)
2000–2006	Anderlecht	108	(1)
2006–2007	Lokeren	35	(1)
2007–2008	Cercle Brugge	31	(0)
Total		373	(31)

International career
2000–2007	Albania	43	(2)
2007	Kosovo	1	(0)

Managerial career
- 2008–2014: Anderlecht (assistant)
- 2014–2016: Anderlecht
- 2016: Legia Warsaw
- 2017: Olympiacos
- 2018–2021: Al-Raed
- 2021–2022: Al-Ahli
- 2023–2025: Mechelen
- 2025–2026: Anderlecht
- 2026–: Amedspor
- * Club domestic league appearances and goals

Besnik Hasi (Albanian pronunciation: [besˈnik ˈhasi]; born 29 December 1971) is a professional football coach and former player who manages Süper Lig club Amedspor. During his playing career, he was known for his versatility as a midfielder and his strong leadership qualities on the field. Hasi spent most of his club career playing in Belgium, where he became a key figure at Anderlecht, one of the country’s most successful teams. Born in Yugoslavia, he made 47 appearances for the Albania national team, before playing one friendly for the Kosovo national team before they applied for FIFA membership.

After retiring as a player, he transitioned into coaching, where he gained recognition for his tactical approach and ability to develop young players. Hasi has managed several clubs across different countries, including stints in Belgium, Poland, Greece, and Saudi Arabia. He was particularly successful during his tenure at Anderlecht, leading them to domestic league success and competing in European tournaments such as the Champions League and the Europa League.

Known for his strategic mindset and disciplined coaching style, Hasi continues to be involved in football management, frequently working with clubs aiming to establish themselves on the European stage.

== Club career ==
Born in Djakovica, SAP Kosovo, SFR Yugoslavia, he began playing with his hometown team Vëllaznimi at an early age before joining Liria playing back then in the Yugoslav Second League where he began playing as a senior. He moved to NK Zagreb during the 1990–91 Yugoslav Second League. He then played one game with Prishtina in the 1991–92 Yugoslav Second League. In 1993–94, he played with NK Samobor in Croatia's second division before moving to Belgium.

Hasi moved to Genk in mid-1994, then to 1860 Munich where he played only seven times during the 1997–98 season. He returned to Genk establishing himself in starting lineup, winning the Belgian Title in the 1998–99 season. During his time at Genk, his family were forced to flee Kosovo to Albania during the Kosovo War.

Hasi moved to Anderlecht in May 2000 and, despite only playing 16 matches in his first season due to injury problems, helped the club retain their league title. He played 30 games the following year, including five in the UEFA Champions League to add to his five of the previous season.

Groin and knee problems restricted Hasi to eleven league appearances and four UEFA Cup games in 2002–03, however, but he returned to fitness to help Anderlecht win back the Belgian crown the following season.

In the 2004–05 season, he suffered torn ligaments in his left knee and was out for three months, when he came back he was limited to just 14 starts as Anderlecht relinquished the title.

Hasi moved to Lokeren during the 2005–06 season. On 11 June 2007, he signed a two-year contract with Cercle Brugge.

== International career ==
=== Albania ===
On 15 November 2000, Hasi made his debut with Albania in a friendly match against Malta after coming on as a substitute at half-time in place of Devi Muka, and he was one of the first Kosovo Albanian to play for Albania. Hasi received the Albanian citizenship on 21 February 2001.

=== Kosovo ===
Six months after retiring from international football with Albania, on 15 June 2007, Hasi made his debut with Kosovo in a friendly match against Saudi Arabia after being named in the starting line-up and acting as captain of the team.

== Managerial career ==
=== Anderlecht ===
Hasi retired at the end of the 2007–08 season and subsequently joined Anderlecht as an assistant manager. He signed a two-year contract with the Belgian club in 2008 and remained in his role for six years, assisting multiple head coaches during his tenure. During this period, he played a crucial role in the development of young players and the tactical setup of the team.

On 10 March 2014, Hasi was promoted to head coach following the dismissal of John van den Brom, after Anderlecht struggled in the league, winning only three of their eight post-Christmas matches and facing the risk of missing out on the title. Under Hasi’s leadership, the club managed a strong turnaround, winning eight of their remaining eleven games, including a crucial final stretch of five consecutive victories. This remarkable run secured Anderlecht’s third consecutive Belgian Championship and reaffirmed their dominance in domestic football.

Following two and a half seasons as head coach with the club, Hasi was sacked on 26 May 2016 after losing the league title to rivals Club Brugge.

=== Legia Warsaw ===
On 4 June 2016, Hasi was appointed new manager of Legia Warsaw. Due to poor results, notably the disastrous 6–0 home defeat to Borussia Dortmund in the 2016–17 UEFA Champions League, Hasi was relieved of his duties on 18 September 2016.

=== Olympiacos ===
On 9 June 2017, Hasi was unveiled as the new manager of the Greek team Olympiacos, penning a two-year contract worth €600k per annum. The board chose him over other candidates based on his experience in UEFA Champions League qualifying matches, with the objective of leading the Reds to the competition's group stage after a year's absence. The feat was officially accomplished on 22 August 2017, as the team pulled off a 3–1 aggregate victory (2–1 at home and 1–0 away) over Rijeka in the competition's playoffs. Criticized for his substandard defensive coaching and man management, Hasi was relieved of his duties on 25 September 2017, due to a string of negative results including a 2–3 Champions League group stage home defeat against Sporting CP, and successive league fixtures without a win, culminating to a 3–2 away loss to arch-rivals AEK despite being 0–2 up after just over 60 minutes of play.

=== Saudi Pro League ===
==== Al-Raed ====
On 26 July 2018, Hasi was appointed as the manager of Al-Raed in the Saudi Pro League. During his tenure, he successfully led the team to one of their highest-ever finishes in the league. In the 2018–19 season, Hasi guided Al-Raed to an 8th-place finish, a significant improvement for the club. The following season, 2019–20, the team continued to progress under his management, securing a 6th-place finish, which marked one of the best seasons in the club’s history. However, in the 2020–21 season, Al-Raed finished in 10th place, and on 30 June 2021, Hasi officially left the club after spending nearly three years in charge.

==== Al-Ahli ====
On 6 June 2021, Hasi was appointed as the head coach of Al-Ahli. His tenure with Al-Ahli, however, proved to be more challenging. The team struggled to maintain consistency in the league, and after 247 days in charge, On 5 March 2022, Hasi was sacked after a 1–0 defeat to Al-Ettifaq.

Despite facing challenges at Al-Ahli, Hasi’s managerial career in Saudi Arabia demonstrated his ability to elevate mid-table teams like Al-Raed into competitive league positions. His tactical approach and leadership played a key role in improving Al-Raed’s performances, while his time at Al-Ahli reflected the pressures and high expectations associated with managing one of Saudi Arabia’s most prominent clubs.

=== Return to Anderlecht ===
On 20 March 2025, Anderlecht announced the appointment of Hasi as the new head coach, signing a contract until the end of the season with an option for an indefinite extension. This marks Hasi’s return to the club where he previously achieved significant success both as a player and a coach. He was sacked on 2 February 2026, after a string of poor results.

==== Amedspor ====
On 10 June 2026, Hasi was appointed as the head coach of Amedspor.

== Career statistics ==
=== Club ===
Appearances and goals by club, season and competition
Club	Season	League			National cup (Note: Includes Yugoslav Cup, Croatian Cup, Belgian Cup, DFB-Pokal)		Continental		Total	
Club	Season	Division	Apps	Goals	Apps	Goals	Apps	Goals	Apps	Goals
Liria Prizren	1988–89	Yugoslav Second League	27	3			—		27	3
Liria Prizren	1989–90	Yugoslav Second League	19	4			—		19	4
Liria Prizren	Total		46	7			—		46	7
Zagreb	1990–91	Yugoslav Second League	5	1	—		—		5	1
Prishtina	1991–92	Yugoslav Second League	1	0	—		—		1	0
Samobor	1993–94	Druga HNL			—		—			
Genk	1994–95	Belgian Second Division	33	14			—		33	14
Genk	1995–96	Belgian Second Division	28	2			—		28	2
Genk	1996–97	Belgian First Division	18	2			—		18	2
Genk	Total		79	18					79	18
1860 Munich	1997–98	Bundesliga	7	0	0	0	—		7	0
Genk	1998–99	Belgian First Division	32	2	3	0	5	0	40	2
Genk	1999–2000	Belgian First Division	29	1	6	1	2	0	37	2
Genk	Total		61	3	9	1	7	0	77	4
Anderlecht	2000–01	Belgian First Division	16	0	1	0	6	0	23	0
Anderlecht	2001–02	Belgian First Division	30	1	1	0	9	1	40	2
Anderlecht	2002–03	Belgian First Division	15	0	3	0	4	1	22	1
Anderlecht	2003–04	Belgian First Division	28	0	4	0	10	0	42	0
Anderlecht	2004–05	Belgian First Division	16	0	0	0	7	0	23	0
Anderlecht	2005–06	Belgian First Division	3	0	1	0	1	0	5	0
Anderlecht	Total		108	1	10	0	37	2	157	3
Lokeren	2005–06	Belgian First Division	15	1	0	0	—		15	1
Lokeren	2006–07	Belgian First Division	20	0	1	0	—		21	0
Lokeren	Total		35	1	1	0	—		36	1
Cercle Brugge	2007–08	Belgian First Division	31	0	4	0	—		35	0
Career total			373	31	24	1	44	2	441	34

=== International ===
Appearances and goals by national team and year
National team	Year	Apps	Goals
Albania	2000	1	0
Albania	2001	6	0
Albania	2002	5	0
Albania	2003	11	1
Albania	2004	7	0
Albania	2005	7	0
Albania	2006	5	1
Albania	2007	1	0
Total		43	2

Scores and results list Albania's goal tally first, score column indicates score after each Hasi goal.

List of international goals scored by Besnik Hasi
No.	Date	Venue	Opponent	Score	Result	Competition
1	10 September 2003	Qemal Stafa Stadium, Tirana, Albania	Georgia	1–0	3–1	Euro 2004 qualifying
2	2 September 2006	Dinamo Stadium, Minsk, Belarus	Belarus	2–2	2–2	Euro 2008 qualifying

== Managerial statistics ==
As of 21 November 2026

Team	From	To	Record					
Team	From	To	G	W	D	L	Win %	Ref.
Anderlecht	10 March 2014	26 May 2016	119	64	28	27	53.78	
Legia Warsaw	4 June 2016	18 September 2016	18	5	6	7	27.78	
Olympiacos	8 June 2017	25 September 2017	11	6	3	2	54.55	
Al-Raed	28 July 2018	31 May 2021	97	37	22	38	38.14	
Al-Ahli	1 July 2021	5 March 2022	25	6	10	9	24.00	
Mechelen	8 November 2023	3 March 2025	56	23	12	21	41.07	
Anderlecht	20 March 2025	1 February 2026	43	18	9	16	41.86	
Amedspor	10 June 2026	Present	12	7	2	3	58.33	
Total			381	166	92	123	43.57	—

== Honours ==
=== Player ===
Genk

- Belgian First Division: 1998–99
- Belgian Cup: 1999–2000

Anderlecht

- Belgian First Division: 2000–01, 2003–04, 2005–06
- Belgian Super Cup: 2000, 2001

=== Manager ===
Anderlecht

- Belgian Pro League: 2013–14
- Belgian Super Cup: 2014

Individual

- Saudi Pro League Manager of the Month: November 2019, December 2019
