= David Brocken =

Belgian footballer and coach

Personal information
- Date of birth: 18 February 1971 (age 55)
- Height: 1.77 m (5 ft 10 in)
- Position: Defender

Youth career
- Lierse S.K.

Senior career*
Years	Team	Apps	(Gls)
1991–1999	Lierse S.K.	240	(17)
1999–2000	R.S.C. Anderlecht	11	(0)
2000–2002	Standard Liège	40	(1)
2002–2003	K.F.C. Lommel S.K.	26	(0)
2003–2005	Vålerenga IF Fotball	43	(3)
Total		360	(21)

International career
1997–2000	Belgium	2	(0)
- * Club domestic league appearances and goals

David Brocken (born 18 February 1971) is a retired Belgian football player and current coach.

== Playing career ==
After a long career in his home country, Brocken played 41 league matches for Vålerenga IF Fotball in 2004 and 2005.

== Manager career ==
After his active career, David Brocken became youth coördinator with Lierse S.K. In 2007, he went back to Norway to become youth coördinator with another former team, Vålerenga. From 2009 he was sports director/youth coördinator with Frigg Oslo.

Since 2012 Brocken has been the chief trainer of Kolbotn Fotball's elite-league women's team.

He also started coaching the low-league men's team Rilindja IL.

On 11 December 2015 it was announced that he would become the new head coach of Vålerenga Fotball Damer.

He was sacked from Vålerenga in August 2016.

== Honours ==
=== Club ===
Lierse

- Belgian First Division A: 1996–97
- Belgian Cup: 1998–99
- Belgian Super Cup: 1997

Anderlecht

- Belgian First Division A: 1999–2000
