= Wim Mennes =

Belgian footballer and manager (born 1977)

Personal information
- Date of birth: 25 January 1977 (age 49)
- Place of birth: Lommel, Belgium
- Height: 1.85 m (6 ft 1 in)
- Position: Midfielder

Team information
- Current team: Hades (head coach)

Youth career
- 1985–1990: Grenstrappers Kolonie
- 1990–1995: Lommel

Senior career*
Years	Team	Apps	(Gls)
1995–2002	Lommel	99	(11)
2002–2008	Westerlo	167	(10)
2009–2012	Sint-Truiden	107	(6)
2012–2014	Bocholt VV	65	(6)
2014–2017	Oosterzonen		
2017–2022	Racing Peer		

Managerial career
- 2022–2023: Wezel Sport
- 2023–: Hades
- * Club domestic league appearances and goals

Wim Mennes (born 25 January 1977) is a Belgian professional football manager and former player who is the head coach of Belgian Division 2 club Hades.

== Playing career ==
Mennes began his professional playing career with Lommel. In the 2000–01 season, he reached the final of the Belgian Cup with Lommel, in which the club narrowly lost to Westerlo with Mennes playing the full match.

Following the cup final, he moved to Westerlo in 2002, where he spent six and a half seasons. During the winter break of the 2008–09 season, he moved to Sint-Truiden, helping them to the Second Division title and promotion at the end of the season. After they were relegated from the Belgian First Division again in 2012, Mennes continued his career in the lower divisions, representing Bocholt VV, Oosterzonen and Racing Peer. In 2022, at the age of 45, Mennes retired from playing football.

== Managerial career ==
Shortly after ending his playing career, Mennes transitioned to a coaching role, taking over as head coach of Belgian Division 3 club Wezel Sport, succeeding Sepp De Roover. In his first season, Mennes led Wezel Sport to the title in the Belgian Division 3 VV B, achieving consecutive promotions for the club. In March 2023, it was announced that Mennes would not continue as coach after the 2022–23 season.

In July 2023, Mennes was appointed head coach of Belgian Division 2 club Hades, succeeding Mirko Licata.

== Personal life ==
After leaving professional football in 2012, Mennes worked as a physical education teacher while continuing to play football at amateur level.

== Honours ==
Lommel

- Belgian Cup runner-up: 2000–01

Sint-Truiden

- Belgian Second Division: 2008–09
