= List of Lommel SK seasons =

Lommel S.K. is a Belgian professional association football club based in Lommel, who currently play in the Belgian First Division B.

Although the club was formed in the immediate aftermath of the dissolution of K.F.C. Lommel S.K. in 2003, this list consists only of the refounded club's history since that date.

== Background ==
In 1927, the club Vlug & Vrij Overpelt-Usines was formed and registered with the Royal Belgian Football Association, playing in the nearby municipality of Overpelt. The club would be refounded and renamed several times in its history, spending approximately equal amounts of time in each of the Belgian Fourth, Third and Second divisions.

In 2003, neighbouring club K.F.C. Lommel S.K. were declared bankrupt. The more notable of the two clubs in recent seasons, board members of the Lommel club contacted their opposite numbers in Overpelt and an agreement was made that the surviving club would transfer to the stadium in Lommel and would be re-registered under the name K.V.S.K. United Overpelt-Lommel (abbreviated to KVSK United), retaining Overpelt's third tier status. The club initially mixed the colours of the two clubs but eventually came to favour the green and white of Lommel.

Promoted at the second time of asking, after an undefeated 2004–05 season, Lommel have retained their second flight status ever since except for one season spent in the third tier in 2017–18. In 2010 they merged with KFC Racing Mol-Wezel to become Lommel United. In 2017 they renamed themselves to their present name of Lommel S.K.

== Seasons ==
Correct as of end of the 2018–19 season

Season	League										Belgian Cup
Season	Division	Pld	W	D	L	GF	GA	Pts	Position	Play-offs	Belgian Cup
Competing as K.V.S.K. United Overpelt-Lommel
2003–04	Third Division B	30	15	10	5	57	33	55	2nd		
2004–05	Third Division B	30	24	6	0	77	22	78	1st		
2005–06	Second Division	32	17	10	5	59	35	61	2nd	2nd	Fifth Round
2006–07	Second Division	34	9	9	16	39	50	36	15th		
2007–08	Second Division	36	16	12	8	51	36	60	4th	3rd	Sixth Round
2008–09	Second Division	36	14	9	13	48	38	51	9th		Sixth Round
2009–10	Second Division	36	20	10	6	55	27	70	2nd	3rd	Fifth Round
Competing as Lommel United
2010–11	Second Division	34	20	5	9	73	44	65	2nd	3rd	Sixth Round
2011–12	Second Division	34	15	7	12	48	42	52	5th		Sixth Round
2012–13	Second Division	34	14	8	12	50	48	50	6th		Fourth Round
2013–14	Second Division	34	16	11	7	56	34	59	5th		Round of 32
2014–15	Second Division	34	21	7	6	62	24	70	2nd	4th	Seventh Round
2015–16	Second Division	34	14	8	10	43	29	50	8th		Sixth Round
2016–17	Belgian First Division B	28	3	9	16	31	52	18	8th	8th (Relegated)	Sixth Round
Competing as Lommel S.K.
2017–18	Belgian First Amateur Division	30	22	5	3	69	20	71	1st	2nd (Promoted)	Sixth Round
2018–19	Belgian First Division B	28	8	7	13	34	46	31	6th	7th	Sixth Round
