= 2001–02 in Belgian football =

Football in Belgium
- Season: 2001–02

The 2001–02 season was the 99th competitive season in Belgian football.

== National team ==
Belgium ended their qualifying campaign for the Football World Cup 2002 at the second place in Group 6. It qualified for the World Cup after the playoff games and lost in the round of 16.

Date	Venue	Opponents	Score*	Comp	Belgium scorers	Match Report
15 August 2001	Helsinki Olympic Stadium, Helsinki (A)	Finland	1-4	F	Bart Goor	www.footbel.be
5 September 2001	King Baudouin Stadium, Brussels (H)	Scotland	2–0	WCQ	Nico Van Kerckhoven, Bart Goor	www.footbel.be
6 October 2001	Maksimir stadium, Zagreb (A)	Croatia	0–1	WCQ		www.footbel.be
10 November 2001	King Baudouin Stadium, Brussels (H)	Czech Republic	1–0	WCP	Gert Verheyen	www.footbel.be
14 November 2001	Toyota Arena, Prague (A)	Czech Republic	1-0	WCP	Marc Wilmots	www.footbel.be
13 February 2002	King Baudouin Stadium, Brussels (H)	Norway	1-0	F	Stefaan Tanghe	www.footbel.be
27 March 2002	Patras (A)	Greece	2-3	F	Bart Goor, Wesley Sonck	www.footbel.be
17 April 2002	King Baudouin Stadium, Brussels (H)	Slovakia	1-1	F	Bart Goor	www.footbel.be
14 May 2002	King Baudouin Stadium, Brussels (H)	Algeria	0–0	F		www.footbel.be
18 May 2002	Stade de France, Saint-Denis (A)	France	2–1	F	Glen De Boeck, Marc Wilmots	www.footbel.be
26 May 2002	Kumamoto (N)	Costa Rica	1–0	F	Bart Goor	www.footbel.be
4 June 2002	Saitama Stadium, Saitama (N)	Japan	2-2	WCFR	Marc Wilmots, Peter Van Der Heyden	www.footbel.be
10 June 2002	Stadium Big Eye, Ōita (N)	Tunisia	1-1	WCFR	Marc Wilmots	www.footbel.be
14 June 2002	Ecopa Stadium, Shizuoka (N)	Russia	3-2	WCFR	Johan Walem, Wesley Sonck, Marc Wilmots	www.footbel.be
17 June 2002	Wing Stadium, Kobe (N)	Brazil	0–2	WCSR		www.footbel.be

* Belgium score given first

Key

- H = Home match
- A = Away match
- N = Neutral field
- F = Friendly
- WCQ = FIFA World Cup 2002 Qualifying, Group 6
- WCP = FIFA World Cup 2002 Playoff
- WCFR = FIFA World Cup 2002 First Round
- WCSR = FIFA World Cup 2002 Second Round

== Honours ==
Competition	Winner
Jupiler League	Genk
Cup	Club Brugge
Supercup	Club Brugge
Second division	Mechelen
Third division A	Zulte-Waregem
Third division B	Eupen

== See also ==
- Belgian First Division 2001-02
- 2001 Belgian Super Cup
- Belgian Second Division
- Belgian Third Division: divisions A and B
- Belgian Promotion: divisions A, B, C and D
