= Ode Thompson =

Nigerian footballer

Personal information
- Date of birth: November 8, 1980 (age 45)
- Height: 1.83 m (6 ft 0 in)
- Position: Striker

Team information
- Current team: K.S.V. Roeselare
- Number: 9

Senior career*
Years	Team	Apps	(Gls)
1996–1998	Julius Berger F.C.		
1998	K.A.A. Gent	3	(0)
1999	Standaard Wetteren (loan)	9	(0)
1999–2000	K.R.C. Harelbeke	26	(12)
2000–2001	R.S.C. Anderlecht	6	(0)
2002	K.V.C. Westerlo (loan)	15	(3)
2002–2003	La Louvière (loan)	10	(0)
2003–2004	RBC Roosendaal	20	(1)
2004	K.V. Oostende	6	(0)
2005	Union	16	(6)
2005–2007	K.V.S.K. United	56	(9)
2008	K.M.S.K. Deinze	12	(4)
2008–2009	K.S.V. Roeselare	9	(1)
2009–2011	K.S.V. Oudenaarde	26	(9)
2011	Eendracht Aalst		

International career
2001–	Nigeria	3	(0)
- * Club domestic league appearances and goals as of 17 July 2009

Ode Thompson (born November 8, 1980) is a Nigerian football player currently retired . Thompson played as a striker.

Thompson began his career in Nigeria with Julius Berger F.C. He moved to Belgium and signed a contract with First Division club K.A.A. Gent in 1996. After a loan spell with Standaard Wetteren he moved to K.R.C. Harelbeke.

After a very good season, he signed a contract with Belgian topclub R.S.C. Anderlecht. However, after a season with little playing time he began his football journey, which brought him to clubs like K.V.C. Westerlo, La Louvière, RBC Roosendaal, K.V. Oostende, Union, K.V.S.K. United, K.M.S.K. Deinze and K.S.V. Roeselare.

In 2009, he signed a contract with Third Division club K.S.V. Oudenaarde. For the 2011–12 season, he will join newly promoted Second Division side Eendracht Aalst.

== Honours ==
Anderlecht

- Belgian Super Cup: 2001
