= Stojanče Zlatanovski =

Macedonian footballer

Personal information
- Full name: Stojan Zlatanovski
- Date of birth: 29 November 1960 (age 65)
- Place of birth: Skopje, SFR Yugoslavia
- Position: Forward

Senior career*
Years	Team	Apps	(Gls)
1978–1982	Vardar	13	(1)
1983	Timok	12	(1)
1983–1985	Bregalnica Štip	20	(1)
1985–1986	Radnički Niš	11	(0)
1986–1987	Castellón	10	(0)
1988–1989	Lommel	9	(1)
1990–1991	PAS Giannina	15	(1)

International career
1979	Yugoslavia U18	5	(1)
- * Club domestic league appearances and goals

Stojan "Stojančo" Zlatanovski (Macedonian: Стојан "Стојанчо" Златановски, born 29 November 1960) is a Macedonian former footballer.

== Club career ==
Born in Skopje, he played with FK Vardar in the Yugoslav First and Second Leagues between 1978 and the winter break of the 1982–83 season. Then he joined Second-level FK Timok and played there till the end of the season. He play in the Second League the following three seasons, first with FK Bregalnica in the following two seasons and then with Serbian side FK Radnički Niš in the 1985–86 season.

In summer 1986, he left Radnički Niš and moved to Spain where he played with Castellón in the 1986–87 Segunda División and was nicknamed Zlatan.

He later played in Belgium with K.F.C. Lommel S.K. in 1988–89, and in Greece with PAS Giannina in 1990–91.

== International career ==
He played for Yugoslavia U-18 in 1979 making 5 appearances and scoring one goal.
