= Samuel Greven =

Belgian footballer

Personal information
- Full name: Samuel Greven
- Date of birth: 8 July 1973 (age 53)
- Place of birth: Leuven, Belgium
- Position: Defender

Youth career
- –1994: Antwerp

Senior career*
Years	Team	Apps	(Gls)
1994–1996	Antwerp	17	(0)
1996–1999	FC Eindhoven	51	(3)
1999–2003	Mechelen	57	(4)
2003–2005	FC Brussels	24	(0)
2005–2008	OH Leuven	72	(7)
2008–2010	Mol-Wezel		
2010–2011	Oosterzonen		
2011–2014	Aarschot		
2014–2015	Wommersom		
2015–2017	Bekkevoort		
2017–2018	Hakendover		
2018–2019	Glabbeek-Zuurbemde		
2019–2020	Atl. Linter		

Managerial career
- 2019–2020: Atl. Linter
- 2020–2021: Zoutleeuw
- 2021–: Heide Linter
- * Club domestic league appearances and goals as of 25 Jan. 2022

Samuel Greven (born 8 July 1973) is a retired professional Belgian footballer.

== Club career ==
Greven started his professional career with Antwerp, but due to lack of playing opportunities he moved to FC Eindhoven in the Dutch Second Division where he played over 50 matches. He moved back to the highest level of Belgian football with Mechelen, relegating to the Belgian Second Division in 2001 but promoting back in the following season. In 2003, Mechelen lost its football license and subsequently relegated to the Belgian Third Division, at which point Greven moved to Second Division team FC Brussels. With Brussels he promoted once again, enjoying another season at the highest level thereafter. In 2005, Greven moved to Second Division team OH Leuven, where he stayed until 2008, moving on to Mol-Wezel in the third division. In 2010, he moved to fourth division team Oosterzonen. Since 2011 he is active in the lower regional divisions of Belgian Football. 2019 is the start of his trainers career. He started with Atlas Linter and nowadays he's trainer at Heide Linter. His goal is to make these smaller clubs successful.
