= Wim Van Diest =

Belgian footballer

Personal information
- Date of birth: 2 March 1977 (age 49)
- Place of birth: Herk-de-Stad, Belgium
- Height: 1.83 m (6 ft 0 in)
- Position: Midfielder

Team information
- Current team: Excelsior Veldwezelt

Senior career*
Years	Team	Apps	(Gls)
1994–1998	K.F.C. Diest		
1998–2003	K.F.C. Lommel S.K.		
2003–2004	K.F.C. Dessel Sport		
2004–present	Excelsior Veldwezelt		
- * Club domestic league appearances and goals

Wim Van Diest (born 2 March 1977) is a Belgian footballer currently playing for Excelsior Veldwezelt. He played in the Jupiler League for Lommel
