= Kurt Vangompel =

Belgian footballer

- Vangompel in 1994

Personal information
- Date of birth: 20 September 1973
- Place of birth: Bree, Belgium
- Date of death: 17 May 1995 (aged 21)
- Place of death: Genk, Belgium
- Position: Striker

Youth career
- Bocholt
- Lommel

Senior career*
Years	Team	Apps	(Gls)
1992–1994	KV Mechelen	54	(14)
1994–1995	Antwerp	27	(5)

International career
1994	Belgium U-21		
- * Club domestic league appearances and goals

Kurt Vangompel (20 September 1973 – 17 May 1995) was a Belgian footballer.

== Club career ==
Vangompel started his career at Bocholt, and played for Lommel and KV Mechelen before joining Antwerp.

== Deaths ==
A talented striker who played for the Belgium U-21's, Vangompel died in a car accident alongside his brother, aged only 21.
