= 1995–96 Belgian First Division =

93rd season of top-tier football in Belgium

Belgian First Division
- Season: 1995–96

Following is a list of the 1995–96 Belgian First Division season.

The Belgian Pro League (officially known as Jupiler Pro League) is the top league competition for association football clubs in Belgium. Contested by 16 clubs, it operates on a system of promotion and relegation with the Belgian Second Division. The competition was created in 1895 by the Royal Belgian Football Association and was first won by FC Liégeois.

Club Brugge won the title of the 1995–96 season.

== Relegated teams ==
Location of teams in Belgian First Division 1995–96

These teams were relegated to the second division at the end of the season:

- R.F.C. Seraing
- K.S.K. Beveren
- K.S.V. Waregem

== Final league table ==
Pos	Team	Pld	W	D	L	GF	GA	GD	Pts	Qualification or relegation
1	Club Brugge	34	25	6	3	83	30	+53	81	Qualified for 1996–97 UEFA Champions League (Note: Club Brugge competed in the UEFA Cup after losing their Champions League qualifying round tie.)
2	Anderlecht	34	22	5	7	83	37	+46	71	Qualified for 1996–97 UEFA Cup
3	Germinal Ekeren	34	15	8	11	53	37	+16	53	Qualified for 1996–97 UEFA Cup
4	Molenbeek	34	13	14	7	43	29	+14	53	Qualified for 1996–97 UEFA Cup
5	Lierse	34	14	10	10	54	45	+9	52	Qualified for 1996 UEFA Intertoto Cup
6	Standard Liège	34	13	12	9	51	46	+5	51	Qualified for 1996 UEFA Intertoto Cup
7	Charleroi	34	13	11	10	59	53	+6	50	Qualified for 1996 UEFA Intertoto Cup
8	Cercle Brugge	34	13	10	11	51	47	+4	49	Qualified for 1996–97 UEFA Cup Winners' Cup
9	Lommel	34	14	6	14	40	45	−5	48	
10	Mechelen	34	12	8	14	40	46	−6	44	
11	Harelbeke	34	13	4	17	40	48	−8	43	
12	Eendracht Aalst	34	11	9	14	51	58	−7	42	
13	Royal Antwerp	34	11	9	14	38	46	−8	42	
14	Gent	34	10	11	13	39	49	−10	41	
15	Sint-Truiden	34	11	7	16	42	60	−18	40	
16	Seraing	34	8	5	21	35	75	−40	29	Relegated to Division II
17	Beveren	34	6	9	19	38	57	−19	27	Relegated to Division II
18	Waregem	34	4	9	21	30	70	−40	21	Relegated to Division II

== Results ==
Home \ Away	AAL	AND	ANT	BEV	CER	CLU	CHA	EKE	GNT	HAR	LIE	LOM	KVM	RWD	SER	STV	STA	WAR
Eendracht Aalst		3–1	0–0	5–1	4–3	0–2	3–4	2–0	2–2	2–0	1–2	4–1	3–2	1–1	5–0	0–5	1–1	1–1
Anderlecht	4–0		1–1	1–0	3–0	2–1	0–2	4–2	3–0	1–3	3–1	3–2	3–1	1–0	7–0	4–0	2–1	2–0
Antwerp	0–1	1–1		1–1	0–1	0–2	1–0	0–2	2–1	2–3	3–1	4–1	1–2	1–1	4–2	1–1	3–2	2–0
Beveren	0–2	0–2	4–0		1–3	3–5	1–1	3–2	2–2	0–0	2–2	0–1	1–1	1–1	1–0	0–2	0–0	5–1
Cercle Brugge	1–1	2–1	3–2	2–0		1–2	0–2	2–2	0–0	2–1	2–3	0–1	3–2	1–1	0–0	2–1	2–3	4–1
Club Brugge	1–3	2–1	2–0	3–1	2–2		0–0	3–1	3–0	2–0	2–1	2–0	6–0	3–0	3–1	2–0	6–1	3–1
Charleroi	2–0	1–3	2–0	3–1	1–1	1–3		1–1	3–3	0–0	1–1	5–0	4–2	2–2	4–2	4–0	2–2	1–0
Germinal Ekeren	5–1	2–2	2–0	1–0	1–0	1–2	3–1		2–0	1–1	1–1	1–2	1–0	1–0	5–0	3–1	2–0	2–0
Gent	3–1	1–3	1–0	3–0	1–5	0–2	1–0	0–2		1–0	0–2	2–0	0–0	2–0	4–2	0–1	2–4	0–0
Harelbeke	2–1	0–4	3–1	1–0	0–2	0–2	4–0	1–2	0–1		2–3	0–3	0–0	4–2	2–1	3–0	2–3	2–1
Lierse	3–1	3–2	1–2	3–1	0–1	2–2	2–1	2–1	2–3	0–1		3–1	0–3	1–1	4–0	3–0	0–0	1–1
Lommel	1–0	2–2	0–0	2–0	0–1	2–2	1–1	2–1	1–1	2–0	0–0		2–1	0–1	0–1	2–3	1–0	2–1
Mechelen	1–0	1–3	0–1	2–1	2–1	0–2	1–2	1–1	0–0	1–0	0–0	2–0		1–1	1–4	2–0	2–0	3–0
Molenbeek	0–0	0–0	0–0	1–0	2–2	0–0	3–1	1–0	1–0	3–1	0–0	0–2	0–1		4–0	2–0	3–1	4–1
Seraing	5–0	2–1	0–1	1–0	1–0	2–3	1–0	1–1	2–2	0–1	1–3	2–1	2–1	0–5		1–2	0–0	0–2
Sint-Truiden	2–2	0–5	2–3	0–2	1–1	2–4	4–1	2–1	1–0	2–0	3–1	0–2	2–2	0–1	4–1		3–1	1–1
Standard Liège	2–1	2–4	1–0	2–2	4–0	1–0	2–2	0–0	1–1	2–1	2–0	1–0	2–1	1–1	3–0	1–1		1–1
Waregem	0–0	1–4	1–1	1–4	1–1	2–5	4–1	1–0	2–2	1–2	1–3	1–3	0–1	0–1	0–3	2–1	0–4	

Legend: Blue = home team win; Yellow = draw; Red = away team win.

== Top goalscorers ==
Rank	Scorer	Club	Goals
1	(Croatia) Mario Stanić	Club Brugge	20
2	(Belgium) Christophe Lauwers	Cercle Brugge	19
3	(Belgium) Gilles De Bilde	Anderlecht	15
3	(Netherlands) Johnny Bosman	Anderlecht	15
5	(Belgium) Marc Wilmots	Standard Liège	14
5	(Democratic Republic of the Congo) Michel Ngonge	Harelbeke	14
5	(Belgium) Patrick Goots	Beveren	14

== Attendances ==
#	Club	Average
1	Anderlecht	18,176
2	Club Brugge	13,853
3	Standard	11,529
4	Charleroi	7,941
5	STVV	7,471
6	Mechelen	7,112
7	Aalst	7,059
8	Lierse	6,824
9	Lommel	6,647
10	Gent	6,576
11	RWDM	5,706
12	Beveren	5,382
13	Antwerp	5,294
14	Waregem	5,076
15	Harelbeke	4,500
16	Ekeren	4,388
17	Cercle	4,159
18	Seraing	3,606
