= 2000–01 in Belgian football =

Football in Belgium
- Season: 2000–01

The 2000–01 season was the 98th competitive season in Belgian football.

== National team ==
Belgium began their qualifying campaign for the Football World Cup 2002.

Date	Venue	Opponents	Score*	Comp	Belgium scorers	Match Report
16 August 2000	Vasil Levski National Stadium, Sofia (A)	Bulgaria	3-1	F	Gert Verheyen (2), Emile Mpenza	www.footbel.be
2 September 2000	King Baudouin Stadium, Brussels (H)	Croatia	0–0	WCQ		www.footbel.be
7 October 2000	Riga (A)	Latvia	4–0	WCQ	Marc Wilmots, Bob Peeters, Jurgen Cavens, Gert Verheyen	www.footbel.be
28 February 2001	King Baudouin Stadium, Brussels (H)	San Marino	10-1	WCQ	Yves Vanderhaeghe (2), Emile Mpenza, Bart Goor (2), Walter Baseggio, Marc Wilmots, Bob Peeters (3)	www.footbel.be
24 March 2001	Hampden Park, Glasgow (A)	Scotland	2-2	WCQ	Marc Wilmots, Daniel Van Buyten	www.footbel.be
25 April 2001	Toyota Arena, Prague (A)	Czech Republic	1-1	F	Emile Mpenza	www.footbel.be
2 June 2001	King Baudouin Stadium, Brussels (H)	Latvia	3-1	WCQ	Marc Wilmots, Emile Mpenza, Mihails Zemļinskis (og)	www.footbel.be
6 June 2001	Serravalle (A)	San Marino	4-1	WCQ	Marc Wilmots (2), Gert Verheyen, Wesley Sonck	www.footbel.be

* Belgium score given first

Key

- H = Home match
- A = Away match
- F = Friendly
- WCQ = FIFA World Cup 2002 Qualifying, Group 6
- og = own goal

== Honours ==
Competition	Winner
Jupiler League	Anderlecht
Cup	Westerlo
Supercup	Anderlecht
Second division	Lommel
Third division A	Ronse
Third division B	Virton

== See also ==
- Belgian First Division 2000-01
- 2000 Belgian Super Cup
- Belgian Second Division
- Belgian Third Division: divisions A and B
- Belgian Promotion: divisions A, B, C and D
