= Frédéric Pierre =

Frédéric Pierre may refer to:

- Frédéric Alfred Pierre, comte de Falloux (1811–1886), French politician and author
- Frédéric Pierre (diver) (born 1969), French diver
- Frédéric Pierre (footballer) (born 1974), Belgian footballer
- Frédéric Pierre (actor), Canadian actor
