= Dalibor Mitrović =

Serbian footballer (born 1977)

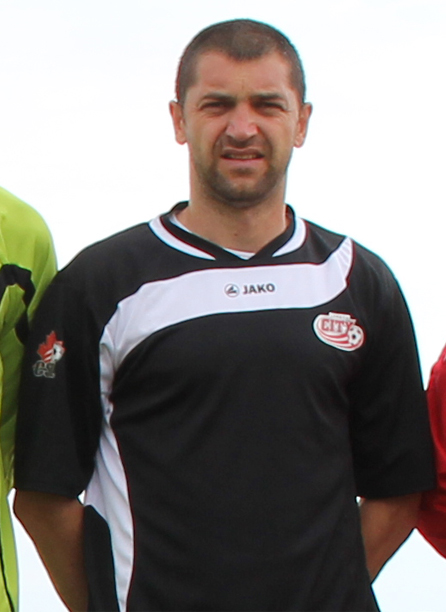
- Mitrović in 2012

Personal information
- Date of birth: 4 November 1977 (age 48)
- Place of birth: Prokuplje, SFR Yugoslavia
- Height: 1.86 m (6 ft 1 in)
- Position: Striker

Youth career
- 1984–1997: Radnički Niš

Senior career*
Years	Team	Apps	(Gls)
1997–1998	Radnički Niš	16	(4)
1998–2001	Club Brugge	8	(0)
2000–2001	→ Westerlo (loan)	27	(12)
2001–2003	Sint-Truiden	48	(8)
2003–2006	Rad	49	(19)
2003–2004	→ Ajaccio (loan)	14	(2)
2006–2007	Argeș Pitești	2	(0)
2007–2010	Rad	44	(10)
2010–2011	Sông Lam Nghệ An	8	(4)
2011–2012	Brantford Galaxy	9	(3)
2012	London City	20	(7)
2012–2013	Radnički Niš	13	(2)
2013–2014	Moravac Mrštane		
- * Club domestic league appearances and goals

Dalibor Mitrović (Serbian Cyrillic: Далибор Митровић; born 4 November 1977) is a Serbian former football striker who played in the First League of Serbia and Montenegro, Belgian First Division A, Serbian SuperLiga, Ligue 1, Liga I, V.League 1, Canadian Soccer League, and the Serbian League East.

== Career ==
Mitrović began his career at Radnički Niš in 1997/98 but joined the then Eerste Klasse champions Club Brugge the following season. After a successful loan spell with Westerlo in 2000–01 (which included winning the Belgian Cup in 2001), Mitrović went on to make 48 league appearances for Sint-Truiden. He returned to Serbia, in January 2003, joining Rad and playing with them in the First League of Serbia and Montenegro. He played in the Ligue 1 after a loan spell with AC Ajaccio in 2003.

In 2006, he went abroad to Romania to sign with FC Argeș Pitești and featured in 12 matches before returning to Belgrade. The following year he signed with Sông Lam Nghệ An F.C. of the V.League 1, and won the league title and the Vietnamese Cup. In 2011, he went overseas to Canada to sign with Brantford Galaxy of the Canadian Soccer League. He signed with league rivals London City in 2012, where he recorded seven goals. At the conclusion of the CSL season he returned his former club Radnički, and retired from competitive football with FK Moravac Mrštane where he won the 2013–14 Serbian League East title.

== Honours ==
Westerlo

- Belgian Cup: 2000-01
