= Rilindja IL =

Norwegian association football club

Rilindja
- Full name: Rilindja Idrettslag
- Founded: 12 April 1987; 39 years ago
- Ground: Haugerud kunstgress
- Capacity: 1,200
- Chairman: Leotrim Iljazi
- Head coach: Blerim Redzepi
- League: 6. divisjon
- 2026: 6. divisjon, 1st of 10th (Champions)
- Website: rilindjafk.no
Home colours	Away colours

Rilindja Idrettslag (Norwegian: [riˈlɪndja ˈɪdrɛtsˌlɑːɡ]; lit. 'Rilindja Sports Club'), or simply Rilindja, is a Norwegian sports club based in Oslo. Its men's football team competes in the 6. divisjon, one of the regional leagues in Norwegian football. In the season of 2027, the club will be back playing in the 5.divisjon after achieving promotion.

Founded in 1987 by the Albanian community in Norway, Rilindja has a history rooted in Oslo's Albanian diaspora. A significant milestone in the club's history came in 2015, when Rilindja reached the first round of the Norwegian Football Cup, where they faced Bærum and were defeated 2–0. The same year, the club achieved promotion to the 3. divisjon for the first time in its history.

Though mainly a football club, Rilindja also hosts other sports such as Chess.

== History ==
=== Founding and early years ===
The club's origins can be traced to the 1980s, when Albanian guest workers regularly gathered in the Tøyen area of Oslo to play football after long working days. For many, football provided a sense of community, friendship, and belonging while living far from their families and homeland. Participation was informal and open to anyone who wished to join, a principle that would become one of the club's defining characteristics.

As the number of players continued to grow, so did the ambition to establish a more structured organization. On 12 April 1987, Dehar Dehari, often referred to as the "father" of Rilindja, together with Xhemadin Neziri, Qani Dehari, Rufki Mamuti, Naser Ademi, Sinan Idrizi, Samet Idrizi, Abdilhamit Shabani, Fadil Etemi, Murtez Dehari, Haki Etemi, Nafi Mamuti, and Astrit Kukleci, took the initiative to establish a club that could compete in organized matches, adopt official club colours, and participate in the Norwegian league system. The club was initially established under the name Kosova. However, due to the political circumstances at the time, it was unable to register under this name and was therefore renamed Rilindja, derived from an Albanian word meaning "Renaissance" or "Rebirth". Through their collective efforts, the founding members transformed an informal gathering of football enthusiasts into an officially recognized sports organization.

The club did not enter the Norwegian league system immediately. The club spent its first three years establishing its organizational structure before making its league debut in 1990, beginning in the 9. divisjon. During its development years, the club relied heavily on volunteer work and support from Oslo's Albanian community. Financial contributions and practical assistance from Albanian immigrants across Norway played an important role in ensuring the club's survival and growth. Throughout the 1990s and the first decade of the 2000s, Rilindja established itself within Oslo's grassroots football scene. The club experienced several promotions and relegations, competing primarily between the 5. divisjon and 6. divisjon. During this period, Rilindja served not only as a football club but also as an important social and cultural meeting place for Albanians living in Norway, helping strengthen community ties while providing opportunities for sporting participation and youth engagement.

A significant turning point in the club's history came when former Belgian international and Vålerenga player David Brocken joined Rilindja as a part-time coach in 2010. Under Brocken, the club achieved consecutive promotions, first from the 6. divisjon in 2011 and then from the 5. divisjon to the 4. divisjon in 2012. The club remained in the 4. divisjon during the 2013 and 2014 seasons.After two seasons in the 4. divisjon, Brocken handed over coaching responsibilities to former Follo and Asker player Alban Shipshani ahead of the 2015 season. Under Shipshani, Rilindja finished second in its 4. divisjon group in 2015 and earned promotion to the 3. divisjon. The club subsequently competed in the 2016 3. divisjon the highest level reached in its history. The club also qualified for the first round of the Norwegian Football Cup in 2015, where it was defeated 2–0 by Bærum. The cup appearance coincided with the club's promotion-winning season and remains its best documented performance in the competition. The years that followed were characterized by both successes and challenges on the field, with the club competing between the 3. divisjon and 6. divisjon.The success significantly raised the club's sporting profile and established Rilindja as a more competitive force within Oslo football.

==== Community engagement and multicultural development ====
At the same time, Rilindja underwent a broader transformation off the pitch. While the club remained proud of its Albanian heritage, it increasingly welcomed players from a wide range of cultural and ethnic backgrounds. During the late 2010s and early 2020s, the club placed a strong emphasis on integration, inclusion, and youth development.

This approach reflected a conscious effort by the club's leadership to promote the values of sport among new generations, particularly young people from immigrant backgrounds. As a result, Rilindja evolved from a predominantly Albanian club into a multicultural organization that reflects the diversity of modern Oslo. While preserving its historical identity and Albanian heritage, the club has developed into a multicultural football institution that welcomes players from all backgrounds and continues to promote participation, inclusion, and sporting development within Oslo's local community.

== Colours and badge ==
Rilindja draws inspiration from the red and black colours of the Albanian flag. The club's home kit consists of red shirts, black shorts and black socks, although red socks are also occasionally worn. The away kit features white shirts, black shorts and white socks. The club badge displays the Albanian double-headed eagle alongside the club's name, city and year of foundation.

== Honours ==
=== Regional ===
- 4. divisjon (tier 5)
  - Winners: 2017
  - Runners-up: 2015
- 5. divisjon (tier 6)
  - Runners-up: 2005, 2012
- 6. divisjon (tier 7)
  - Winners: 2004, 2011, 2026
  - Runners-up: 2000

== League history ==
The table below details Rilindja's league performance since 2000, including promotions, relegations and participation in the Norwegian Football Cup.

Season	Division	Tier	Pos.	Pl.	W	D	L	GS	GA	P	Cup	Notes
2000	6. divisjon avd. 1	7	↑2	18	14	0	4	56	27	42		Promoted to the 5. divisjon
2001	5. divisjon avd. 2	6	7	18	6	1	11	58	72	19		
2002	5. divisjon avd. 3	6	↓10	18	2	2	14	43	90	8		Relegated to the 6. divisjon
2003	6. divisjon avd. 1	7	4	18	9	1	8	72	50	28		
2004	6. divisjon avd. 1	7	↑1	18	13	2	3	71	33	41		Promoted to the 5. divisjon
2005	5. divisjon avd. 1	6	↑2	16	10	1	5	44	23	31		Promoted to the 4. divisjon
2006	4. divisjon avd. 2	5	10	22	7	4	11	50	70	25		
2007	4. divisjon avd. 1	5	5	18	9	3	6	55	38	30		
2008	4. divisjon	5	N/A	N/A	N/A	N/A	N/A	N/A	N/A	N/A		
2009	5. divisjon avd. 1	6	6	18	9	1	8	52	54	28		
2010	5. divisjon avd. 3	6	6	18	5	6	7	35	38	21		
2011	6. divisjon avd. 3	7	↑1	18	14	2	2	78	30	44		Promoted to the 5. divisjon
2012	5. divisjon avd. 3	6	↑2	18	13	0	5	67	38	39		Promoted to the 4. divisjon
2013	4. divisjon avd. 2	5	7	22	8	5	9	49	52	29		
2014	4. divisjon avd. 2	5	2	22	13	4	5	71	41	43		
2015	4. divisjon avd. 2	5	↑2	20	17	2	1	81	22	53	First round	Promoted to the 3. divisjon
2016	3. divisjon avd. 2	4	↓6	26	11	4	11	60	55	37		Relegated to the 4. divisjon despite finishing 6th since 2016 was a restructuring season. Only top four stayed in the new 3. divisjon.
2017	4. divisjon avd. 2	5	↑1	22	17	2	3	84	34	53		Promoted to the 3. divisjon
2018	3. divisjon avd. 1	4	↓11	26	9	4	13	42	65	31		Relegated to the 4. divisjon
2019	4. divisjon avd. 3	5	2	22	17	2	3	75	27	53		
2020	4. divisjon	5	-	-	-	-	-	-	-	-		Cancelled due to the COVID-19 pandemic
2021	4. divisjon avd. 2	5	8	13	4	6	3	27	26	18		
2022	4. divisjon avd. 2	5	↓10	22	7	4	11	36	58	25		Relegated to the 5. divisjon
2023	5. divisjon avd. 1	6	↓12	22	5	2	15	44	76	17		Relegated to the 6. divisjon
2024	6. divisjon avd. 1	7	7	18	6	4	8	41	49	21		
2025	6. divisjon avd. 1	7	3	18	10	2	6	51	28	32		
2026	6. divisjon avd. 1	7	↑1	18	15	1	2	74	24	46		Promoted to the 5. divisjon

=== Overall ===
Listed from 2000 to present:

- Seasons spent at Tier 4 of the Norwegian football league system: 2
- Seasons spent at Tier 5 of the football league system: 11
- Seasons spent at Tier 6 of the football league system: 7
- Seasons spent at Tier 7 of the football league system: 7

(as of 2026 season)

== Managerial history ==
Dates	Name	Notes
1987–2010	Unknown	
2010–2014	(Belgium) David Brocken	
2015	(Norway) Alban Shipshani	Player-coach
2015-2018	(Denmark) Michael Frank	
2019	(Norway) Ismet Crnalic	
2020–2024	(Norway) Alban Shipshani	
2024	(Norway) Saif Haydar	
2025–	(Norway) Blerim Redzepi	

== Notable players ==
- (Norway) Ilir Kukleci

== Notable coaches ==
- (Belgium) David Brocken
