= Marc Hendrikx =

Belgian footballer

Personal information
- Full name: Marc Hendrikx
- Date of birth: 2 July 1974 (age 52)
- Place of birth: Hamont, Belgium
- Height: 1.84 m (6 ft 0 in)
- Position: Midfielder

Senior career*
Years	Team	Apps	(Gls)
1992–1997	Lommel	113	(11)
1997–2001	Genk	121	(17)
2001–2004	Anderlecht	69	(9)
2004–2005	Lokeren	29	(5)
2005–2006	Germinal Beerschot	24	(2)
2006–2009	Sint-Truiden	67	(5)
2009–2011	Eupen	51	(2)
Total		474	(51)

International career
1999–2001	Belgium	15	(0)
- * Club domestic league appearances and goals

Marc Hendrikx (Dutch pronunciation: [ˈmɑr(ə)k ˈɦɛndrɪks]; born 2 July 1974 in Hamont, Belgium) is a former professional football (soccer) midfielder. He started his career with KFC Lommelse SK, then moved on to Racing Genk and, in 2001 he got the opportunity to play in the top flight and the Champions League after moving to Anderlecht. In 2004, he spent a single season with Lokeren, before moving to Germinal Beerschot and then Sint-Truiden, where he played until 2009. Hendrikx last played for Eupen.

== Honours ==
Genk

- Belgian First Division: 1998–99
- Belgian Cup: 1997–98, 1999–2000

Anderlecht

- Belgian Super Cup: 2001
- Belgian First Division: 2003–04
