= Frédéric Pierre (footballer) =

Belgian footballer

Personal information
- Date of birth: 23 February 1974 (age 52)
- Place of birth: Namur, Belgium
- Height: 1.78 m (5 ft 10 in)
- Position: Right midfielder

Senior career*
Years	Team	Apps	(Gls)
1990–1992	Racing Jet Wavre	35	(8)
1992–1995	K.F.C. Germinal Ekeren	34	(7)
1995–1997	RWD Molenbeek	61	(23)
1997–1999	R.E. Mouscron	48	(12)
1999–2000	Standard Liège	26	(5)
2000–2001	RSC Anderlecht	6	(1)
2001–2002	Nîmes Olympique	4	(0)
2002–2003	KSK Beveren	7	(1)
2003	AS Eupen	9	(1)
2004	FC Universitatea Craiova	0	(0)
Total		230	(58)

International career
1996–1999	Belgium	8	(0)
- * Club domestic league appearances and goals

Frédéric Pierre (born 23 February 1974) is a retired Belgian football midfielder.

== Career ==
Frédéric Pierre spent most of his career playing in his native Belgium, with two short spells in France at Nîmes Olympique and in Romania at FC Universitatea Craiova. He opened the score in the first minute of the game for Standard Liège in the 2000 Belgian Cup Final, which was eventually lost with 4–1 in favor of Genk. In the 2000–01 season Pierre played for RSC Anderlecht, helping the team win the league title.

== International career ==
Frédéric Pierre played 8 games at international level for Belgium, making his debut when he came as a substitute and replaced Christophe Lauwers in the 61st minute of a friendly which ended 0–0 against Russia. He also appeared in a 3–0 away victory against San Marino and in a 0–3 home loss against Netherlands at the 1998 World Cup qualifiers.

== Conviction ==
On 20 December 2014 Pierre was involved in a road accident while driving his car in Fexhe-le-Haut-Clocher. He did not stop at a red light in an intersection and hit a 58-year old woman who died. He had 0.66 mg of alcohol per liter of breathing air, 1.51 grams of alcohol per liter of blood and he was traveling at 70 km/h, also in the past he was condemned for a road accident in which a person was hurt. He was convicted and sentenced to 34 months in jail in 2017; this was reduced on appeal in 2018 to 200 hours of community service.

== Honours ==
Standard Liège

- Belgian Cup runner-up: 1999–00

RSC Anderlecht

- Belgian First Division: 2000–01
