= Toni Brogno =

Belgian footballer (1973–2026)

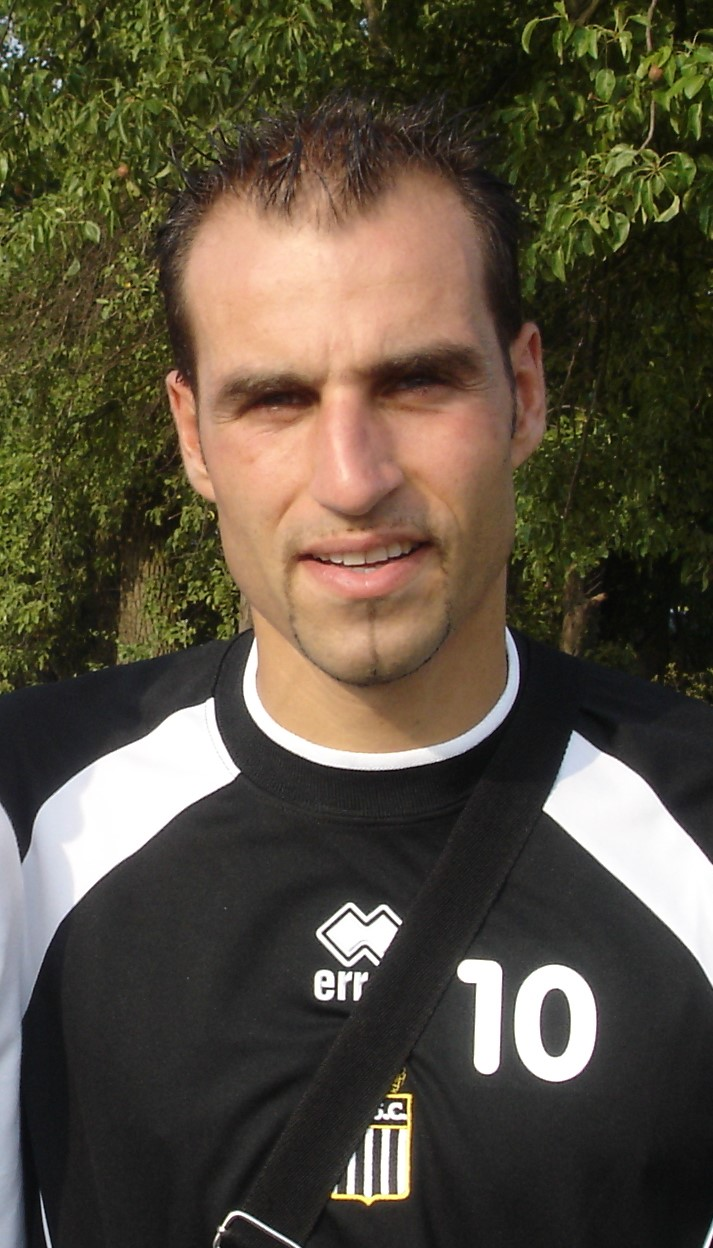
- Brogno in 2005

Personal information
- Full name: Antonio Brogno
- Date of birth: 19 July 1973
- Place of birth: Charleroi, Belgium
- Date of death: 3 November 2026 (aged 53)
- Place of death: Charleroi, Belgium
- Position: Forward

Senior career*
Years	Team	Apps	(Gls)
1993–1994	Marchienne		
1994–1995	Sporting Charleroi	5	(0)
1995–1997	Olympic Charleroi	62	(25)
1997–2000	Westerlo	84	(49)
2000–2002	Sedan	29	(8)
2002–2005	Westerlo	61	(17)
2005–2006	Sporting Charleroi	55	(9)
2006–2008	OH Leuven	53	(24)
2008–2009	Olympic Charleroi	28	(5)

International career
1998–2000	Belgium	7	(0)
- * Club domestic league appearances and goals

Antonio "Toni" Brogno (19 July 1973 – 3 November 2026) was a Belgian professional footballer who played as a forward.

He played 206 games and scored 75 goals in the Belgian Pro League for Sporting Charleroi, Westerlo and OH Leuven, and was the joint top scorer of the 1999–2000 season with 30 goals for Westerlo. He spent two seasons in Ligue 1 in France with Sedan, and played for the Belgium national football team seven times.

== Club career ==
Born in Charleroi on 19 July 1973, Brogno began his career at Marchienne, alongside his brothers Dante and David. He spent one season with Sporting Charleroi, playing infrequently, and then had two seasons across the city at Olympic Charleroi.

In 1997, Brogno moved from Olympic Charleroi to Westerlo, where he partnered Jochen Janssen, who joined in the same year from Lommel. He finished top scorer of the Belgian First Division in 1999–2000 with the same number of goals as Ole Martin Årst (30).

He had his only spell out of Belgium in 2000, when he signed for Ligue 1 club Sedan for 6 million FFs (around €1 million). He replaced Alex Di Rocco at the club and scored six times in his first 12 games, as his team finished 5th and qualified for the UEFA Cup. On 27 September 2001, in the first round, he scored twice in a 3–1 home win over Czech club Marila Příbram; he finished his time at the club with 10 goals from 32 games.

In 2002, Brogno returned to Westerlo. He retired in 2009, after spells at Sporting Charleroi, OH Leuven and Olympic Charleroi.

== International career ==
Brogno played seven games for the Belgium national team between November 1998 and April 2000. After finishing as top scorer in the domestic league, he was named in the initial squad for the country's co-hosting of UEFA Euro 2000, but manager Robert Waseige cut him and Danny Boffin from the final 22 players.

== Personal life and death ==
After retiring from football, Brogno worked at a Decathlon outlet in Châtelineau. He died from liver cancer in Charleroi on 3 November 2026, aged 53, having been diagnosed in 2024. His funeral was scheduled for 7 November in Gilly.

== Honours ==
Olympic Charleroi

- Belgian Third Division: 1995–96

Individual

- Belgian First Division top scorer: 1999–2000 (30 goals)

== Sources ==
- Toni Brogno at National-Football-Teams.com
- Toni Brogno Belgian league statistics at the Belgian Soccer Database (registration required)
