= Ilir Kukleci =

Norwegian footballer (born 1997)

Personal information
- Date of birth: 27 October 1998 (age 28)
- Place of birth: Oslo, Norway
- Height: 1.94 m (6 ft 4 in)
- Position: Centre-back

Team information
- Current team: Teuta
- Number: 5

Youth career
- –2014: Frigg
- 2015: Oppsal

Senior career*
Years	Team	Apps	(Gls)
2014	Frigg	2	(0)
2016	Rilindja	22	(3)
2017–2018	Frigg	29	(6)
2019–2020	Arendal	12	(0)
2021–2022	Frigg	27	(3)
2023–2024	Moss	49	(1)
2025	Haugesund	7	(1)
2026	Hamkam	7	(0)
2026–	Teuta	0	(0)
- * Club domestic league appearances and goals as of 25 August 2026

Ilir Kukleci (born 27 October 1998) is a Norwegian professional footballer who plays as a centre-back for Teuta.

== Career ==
Kukleci was born in Oslo the son of an Albanian father and a Croatian mother. He played youth football for Frigg, and made his senior debut in the 2014 3. divisjon. Following one year of youth football in Oppsal and one year in the Oslo-based Albanian diaspora club Rilindja, he rejoined Frigg in 2017.

After Frigg ended the 2018 3. divisjon campaign "one goal shy of promotion", Kukleci left Oslo and signed for 2. divisjon club Arendal. In June 2019 he was sidelined by a groin injury, which took over a year to heal. He returned in July 2020 following a visit to a private clinic in Croatia. In 2021 he returned to Frigg for his third spell.

Kukleci was then picked up by Moss FK, and in their 2024 1. divisjon season which ended in playoff to the Eliteserien, he led the performance points chart crafted by the local newspaper. In 2025 he was signed by his first Eliteserien club, FK Haugesund. He was thought of as a replacement for Ulrik Fredriksen, but when the season started in April, Kukleci was out with another groin injury. He made his Eliteserien debut in July, as FK Haugesund was already on a path to certain relegation. He was released by Haugesund after their relegation, and picked up by Hamkam where he was reunited with his former Moss manager, Thomas Myhre.
