= 1998–99 in Belgian football =

Football in Belgium
- Season: 1998–99

The 1998–99 season was the 96th competitive season in Belgian association football.

== National team ==
Date	Venue	Opponents	Score*	Comp	Belgium scorers	Match Report
November 18, 1998	Stade Josy Barthel, Luxembourg (A)	Luxembourg	0–0	F		www.footbel.be
February 3, 1999	Tsirion Athletic Centre, Nicosia (A)	Cyprus	1–0	F	Emile Mpenza	www.footbel.be
February 5, 1999	New GSZ Stadium, Larnaca, Cyprus (A)	Greece	0–1	F		www.footbel.be
February 9, 1999	King Baudouin Stadium, Brussels (H)	Czech Republic	0–1	F		www.footbel.be
March 27, 1999	King Baudouin Stadium, Brussels (H)	Bulgaria	0–1	F		www.footbel.be
March 30, 1999	Stade Maurice Dufrasne, Liège (H)	Egypt	0–1	F		www.footbel.be
April 28, 1999	Steaua Bucharest, Bucharest (A)	Romania	0–1	F		www.footbel.be
May 30, 1999	Nishikyogoku Stadium, Kyoto (A)	Peru	1–1	F	Stefaan Tanghe	www.footbel.be
June 3, 1999	National Stadium, Tokyo (A)	Japan	0–0	F		www.footbel.be
June 5, 1999	Olympic Stadium, Seoul (A)	South Korea	2–1	F	Sandy Martens (2)	www.footbel.be

* Belgium score given first

Key

- H = Home match
- A = Away match
- F = Friendly
- og = own goal

== Honours ==
Competition	Winner
Jupiler League	Genk
Cup	Lierse
Supercup	Lierse
Second division	KV Mechelen
Third division A	Ingelmunster
Third division B	Tienen

== See also ==
- Belgian First Division 1998-99
- 1999 Belgian Super Cup
- Belgian Second Division
- Belgian Third Division: divisions A and B
- Belgian Promotion: divisions A, B, C and D
