= Richard Culek =

Czech footballer (born 1974)

Personal information
- Date of birth: 1 April 1974 (age 52)
- Place of birth: Liberec, Czechoslovakia
- Height: 1.88 m (6 ft 2 in)
- Position: Defensive midfielder

Senior career*
Years	Team	Apps	(Gls)
1992–1994	Slovan Liberec	24	(1)
1994	→ Švarc Benešov (loan)	14	(0)
1995–1997	Chemnitzer FC	37	(0)
1997–1999	Slovan Liberec	16	(1)
1999–2000	Bohemians 1905	25	(1)
2000–2003	Lommel	79	(16)
2003	Westerlo	1	(0)
2004–2009	Brussels	159	(32)
2009–2010	Viktoria Žižkov	28	(2)
2010–2014	Bocholter VV	127	(2)
Total		510	(55)

International career
1993–1994	Czech Republic U21	5	(1)
- * Club domestic league appearances and goals

Richard Culek (born 1 April 1974) is a Czech former professional footballer who played as a midfielder.

He played for Slovan Liberec, FK Švarc Benešov, Chemnitzer FC, FC Bohemians Praha, KFC Lommelse SK, K.V.C. Westerlo, FC Brussels, FK Viktoria Žižkov, and Bocholter VV.
