= 1999–2000 Belgian Cup =

Tournament details
- Country: Belgium

Final positions
- Champions: Genk
- Runners-up: Standard Liège

Tournament statistics
- Matches played: 33
- Goals scored: 98 (2.97 per match)
- Top goal scorer: Thordur Gudjonsson (5 goals)

The 1999–2000 Belgian Cup was the 45th season of the main knockout competition in Belgian association football, the Belgian Cup.

== Final rounds ==
The final phase started in the round of 32 when all clubs from the first division entered the competition (18 clubs plus 14 clubs from the qualifications). All rounds were played in one leg except for the semifinals. The final game was played at the Heysel Stadium in Brussels and won by Genk against Standard Liège.

=== Bracket ===
Round of 32
Genk	3
Tongeren	0
Anderlecht	1
Ingelmunster	4
Waregem	1
Cercle Brugge	0
Gent	3
Dessel Sport	1
Louviéroise	0(2)
Mouscron	0(3)
Sint-Truidense	1*
Francs Borains	0
R Charleroi SC	2
Aalst	6
Oostende	0
Germinal Beerschot Antwerpen	1
Standard Liège	3
Harelbeke	2
Westerlo	3
Beveren	1
Geel	1(3)
Mons	1(4)
Lommelse	2
Molenbeek	1
Antwerp	4
Heusden-Zolder	0
Lierse	6
Torhout	1
Lokeren	1
Club Brugge	0
KV Mechelen	2
Hekelgem	1

Round of 16
Genk	8
Ingelmunster	1
Waregem	0
Gent	2
Mouscron	0(1)
Sint-Truidense	0(4)
Aalst	4
Germinal Beerschot Antwerpen	1
Standard Liège	2
Westerlo	1
Mons	2
Lommelse	0
Antwerp	1
Lierse	2
Lokeren	4
KV Mechelen	0

Quarter-finals
Genk	3
Gent	1
Sint-Truidense	2
Aalst	1
Standard Liège	1
Mons	0
Lierse	1
Lokeren	0

Semifinals
Genk	0	1
Sint-Truidense	0	0
Standard Liège	2	0
Lierse	1	0

Final
Genk	4
Standard Liège	1

* after extra time

=== Final ===
14 May 2000
16:00 CEST

Genk	4–1	Standard Liège
Ban 20'; Guðjónsson 54', 76'; Hasi 81'		Pierre 1'

King Baudouin Stadium, Brussels
Attendance: 47,000
Referee: Michel Piraux
