= 2000–01 Belgian Cup =

Tournament details
- Country: Belgium

Final positions
- Champions: Westerlo
- Runners-up: Lommel

Tournament statistics
- Matches played: 34
- Goals scored: 98 (2.88 per match)

The 2000–01 Belgian Cup was the 46th season of the main knockout competition in Belgian association football, the Belgian Cup.

== Final rounds ==
The final phase started in round 32 when all clubs from the first division entered the competition (18 clubs plus 14 clubs from the qualifications). All rounds were played in one leg except for the semifinals (in two legs) and the quarter-finals (in one leg with replay). The final game was played at the Heysel Stadium in Brussels, where Westerlo won 1–0 against Lommel.

=== Bracket ===
Round of 32
Germinal Beerschot	1
Hoogstraten	0
RFC Liège	1
Ingelmunster	2
Anderlecht	2
Harelbeke	1
Red Star Haasdonk	1
Gent	3*
Westerlo	1
Denderleeuw	0
KV Mechelen	1
Beveren	3
Antwerp	1
Schoten	0
Sint-Truiden	3
Charleroi	0
Aalst	0
Lommel	2
La Louvière	2
Club Brugge	1
Standard Liège	3
Turnhout	2
Lokeren	2
Mons	1
Lierse	0
Geel	2
Genk	2
Mouscron	1
TK Meldert	2
Denderhoutem	1
Cercle Brugge	1*
Kortrijk	0

Round of 16
Germinal Beerschot	2
Ingelmunster	1
Anderlecht	2
Gent	1
Westerlo	3
Beveren	1
Antwerp	1
Sint-Truiden	3
Lommel	3
La Louvière	0
Standard Liège	0
Lokeren	1
Geel	0
Genk	4
TK Meldert	1
Cercle Brugge	2

Quarter-finals
Germinal Beerschot	3
Anderlecht	0
Westerlo	1
Sint-Truiden	0
Lommel	3
Lokeren	1
Genk	4*/2+
Cercle Brugge	4*/1+

Semifinals
Germinal Beerschot	1	1
Westerlo	2	2
Lommel	2	1
Genk	1	1

Final
Westerlo	1
Lommel	0

* after extra time + replay

=== Final ===
27 May 2001
16:15 CEST

Westerlo	1–0	Lommel
Delen 22'

King Baudouin Stadium, Brussels
Referee: Eric Romain
