= Ives Serneels =

Belgian football coach and former player

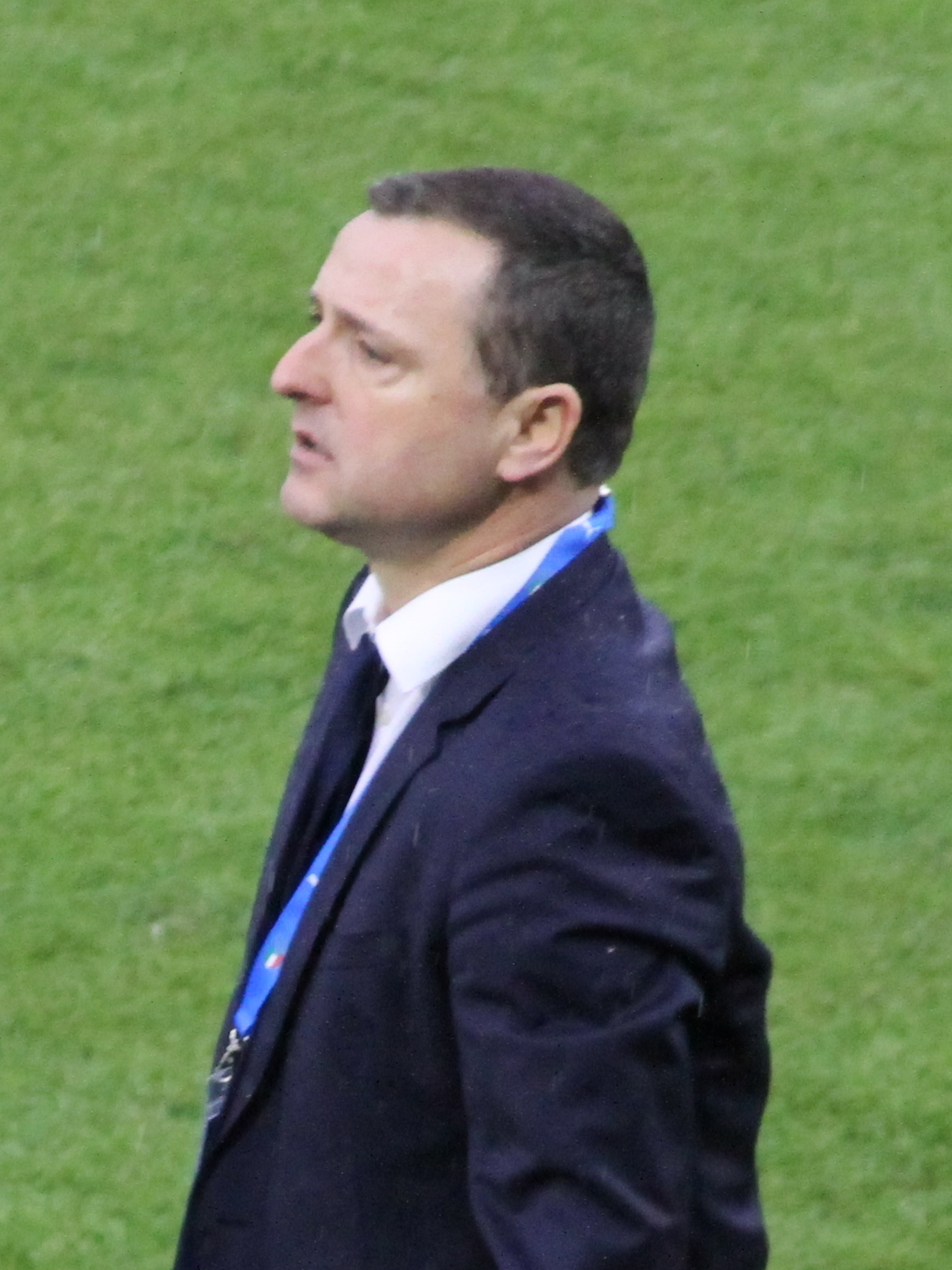
- Serneels in 2018

Personal information
- Date of birth: 16 October 1972 (age 54)
- Place of birth: Bonheiden, Belgium
- Position: Defender

Youth career
- 1979–1986: Ourodenberg Sport
- 1986–1988: Aarschot Sport
- 1988–1990: TH Diest

Senior career*
Years	Team	Apps	(Gls)
1990–1999	Lierse SK	210	(9)
1999–2002	Westerlo	65	(4)
2002–2003	Denderleeuw	30	(1)
2003–2004	KFC Dessel Sport	3	(0)

Managerial career
- 2003–2006: KFC Dessel Sport
- 2007: Berchem Sport
- 2008–2010: Lierse SK (youth)
- 2010–2011: Lierse SK (women)
- 2011–2024: Belgium women
- * Club domestic league appearances and goals as of 15:11, 8 September 2015 (UTC) ‡ National team caps and goals as of 16:47, 23 January 2025 (UTC)

Ives Serneels (born 16 October 1972) is a Belgian football manager and former professional footballer who most recently managed the Belgium women's national football team.

== Playing career ==
On 22 August 1990 Lierse SK manager Barry Hulshoff gave Serneels his debut in a match at Lokeren. Serneels remained with the club for nine seasons and was part of the 1996–97 title-winning team. After making 245 appearances in all competitions and scoring ten goals for Lierse he joined Westerlo in 1999. He then wound down his playing career with short spells at Denderleeuw and KFC Dessel Sport.

== Coaching career ==
In March 2011 Serneels was appointed coach of the Belgium women's national football team, nicknamed the "Red Flames". The team's results improved under Serneels and national captain Aline Zeler compared him to Marc Wilmots, the successful manager of Belgium's male national team.

== Honours ==
=== Player ===
Lierse SK

- Belgian First Division: 1996–97
- Belgian Super Cup: 1997
- Belgian Cup: 1998–99

Westerlo

- Belgian Cup: 2000-01
