= Sepp De Roover =

Belgian football manager (born 1984)

Personal information
- Date of birth: 12 November 1984 (age 41)
- Place of birth: Geel, Belgium
- Height: 1.80 m (5 ft 11 in)
- Position: Right back

Team information
- Current team: Young Reds Antwerp

Youth career
- Verbroedering Geel

Senior career*
| Years | Team | Apps | (Gls) |
| 2001–2002 | Verbroedering Geel | 11 | (0) |
| 2002–2003 | Westerlo | 0 | (0) |
| 2003–2005 | PSV | 0 | (0) |
| 2005–2006 | FC Eindhoven | 37 | (1) |
| 2006–2008 | Sparta Rotterdam | 53 | (3) |
| 2008–2010 | FC Groningen | 51 | (3) |
| 2010–2013 | SC Lokeren | 27 | (1) |
| 2012–2013 | → NAC Breda (loan) | 30 | (1) |
| 2013–2015 | NAC Breda | 38 | (0) |
| 2015–2016 | KFC De Kempen | | |
| 2016–2019 | KSAV St. Dimpna | | |

International career
| 2007 | Belgium U21 | 4 | (0) |
| 2009 | Belgium | 2 | (0) |

Managerial career
- 2020–2022: Wezel Sport
- 2022–2023: Lierse Kempenzonen U21
- 2023: Heist
- 2023–2024: OH Leuven (assistant)
- 2024–: Young Reds Antwerp
- * Club domestic league appearances and goals

Sepp De Roover (Dutch pronunciation: [ˈsɛb də ˈroːvər]; born 12 November 1984) is a retired Belgian footballer who played as a right back and is currently managing Young Reds Antwerp.

== Career ==
=== Club career ===
De Roover played as a defender and was born in Geel. He made his debut in professional football, being part of the FC Eindhoven squad in the 2005–06 season before joining Sparta Rotterdam. In 2008, he signed to play for FC Groningen.

De Roover played for the Belgium national football team at the 2008 Summer Olympics.

On 12 June 2010 it was announced that De Roover will play for SC Lokeren as of the start of the 2010–2011 season. On 5 August 2012 it was announced that De Roover was sent on loan to NAC Breda in the Dutch Eredivisie. He made a permanent transfer to NAC in June 2013.

=== Coaching career ===
On 8 January 2020 it was confirmed, that De Roover would become the head coach of Wezel Sport.
