= 1999–2000 Belgian First Division =

97th season of top-tier football in Belgium

Belgian First Division
- Season: 1999–2000
- Champions: Anderlecht
- Relegated: Geel; Lommel
- Champions League: Anderlecht
- UEFA Cup: Club Brugge; Gent
- Matches: 306
- Goals: 1,032 (3.37 per match)
- Top goalscorer: Ole Martin Årst; Toni Brogno (30 each)

The 1999–2000 season of the Jupiler League was held between August 6, 1999, and May 11, 2000. Sporting Anderlecht became champions.

== Promoted teams ==
Location of teams in 1999–2000 Belgian First Division

These teams were promoted from the second division at the start of the season:

- KV Mechelen (second division champions)
- Verbroedering Geel (playoff winner)

== Relegated teams ==
These teams were relegated to the second division at the end of the season:

- Verbroedering Geel
- Lommel

== Anderlecht's title success ==
Anderlecht became champions on April 21, 2000, after the defeat of rival Club Brugge at Herman Vanderpoortenstadion to Lierse 1-0 as, prior to these results, they were 7 points ahead of Brugge with 3 matches to go. The next day Anderlecht beat Racing Genk 4-1 and then Standard Liège 2-0.

== Battle for Europe ==
Club Brugge and Gent qualified for the UEFA Cup.

== The relegation dog fight ==
Charleroi avoided relegation with a controversial draw against Anderlecht on the last day of the season. Anderlecht were already champions and played with Enzo Scifo who had previously signed a deal with Charleroi. However, the result was irrelevant as Geel lost their last match to Club Brugge and were thus relegated with Lommel.

== Final league table ==
Pos	Team	Pld	W	D	L	GF	GA	GD	Pts	Qualification or relegation
1	Anderlecht (C)	34	22	9	3	86	36	+50	75	Qualification to Champions League second qualifying round
2	Club Brugge	34	21	4	9	70	32	+38	67	Qualification to UEFA Cup qualifying round
3	Gent	34	20	3	11	78	54	+24	63	Qualification to UEFA Cup qualifying round
4	Mouscron	34	16	9	9	67	45	+22	57	
5	Standard Liège	34	18	2	14	66	52	+14	56	Qualification to Intertoto Cup first round
6	Westerlo	34	16	8	10	73	66	+7	56	Qualification to Intertoto Cup first round
7	Germinal Beerschot	34	16	7	11	56	45	+11	55	
8	Genk	34	16	6	12	63	59	+4	54	Qualification to UEFA Cup first round
9	Lierse	34	15	7	12	65	47	+18	52	Qualification to UEFA Cup qualifying round
10	Sporting Lokeren	34	12	11	11	56	58	−2	47	
11	Mechelen	34	12	5	17	47	77	−30	41	
12	Eendracht Aalst	34	11	4	19	53	72	−19	37	
13	Sint-Truiden	34	10	7	17	41	65	−24	37	
14	Harelbeke	34	10	5	19	56	72	−16	35	
15	Beveren	34	9	8	17	51	69	−18	35	
16	Charleroi	34	7	10	17	42	62	−20	31	
17	Geel (R)	34	5	13	16	32	60	−28	28	Relegation to 2000–01 Belgian Second Division
18	Lommel (R)	34	5	12	17	35	66	−31	27	Relegation to 2000–01 Belgian Second Division

(C) Champions; (R) Relegated

== Results ==
Home \ Away	AAL	AND	GBA	BEV	CLU	CHA	GEE	GNK	GNT	HAR	LIE	LOK	LOM	MEC	MOU	STV	STA	WES
Eendracht Aalst		2–3	1–2	2–4	0–2	0–3	1–0	1–3	4–2	3–0	2–3	1–0	3–1	2–0	2–5	2–0	1–2	1–1
Anderlecht	4–1		2–2	5–2	1–1	3–0	4–0	1–3	1–2	2–0	2–0	5–0	3–3	5–0	3–2	2–1	2–0	3–0
Germinal Beerschot	3–2	1–3		2–0	5–3	3–0	4–1	3–0	2–0	1–0	1–1	0–0	3–1	0–0	0–1	3–1	2–0	3–2
Beveren	0–2	0–0	1–4		2–3	1–1	1–1	1–4	0–1	2–2	1–1	2–1	1–0	2–1	1–1	3–4	0–2	4–0
Club Brugge	3–0	0–2	2–0	3–1		3–1	4–0	2–0	1–3	1–2	1–0	6–1	3–1	6–0	1–2	4–0	5–2	2–0
Charleroi	0–1	1–1	3–0	2–3	0–2		1–3	2–1	1–2	2–1	1–1	2–4	1–1	1–4	2–1	1–1	1–4	1–2
Geel	1–2	0–0	0–2	1–1	0–2	0–0		1–1	1–5	3–2	2–1	3–0	0–0	3–0	1–4	1–2	0–0	2–3
Genk	2–1	1–4	4–0	4–1	1–0	1–2	1–0		0–1	4–3	2–2	1–1	1–2	3–1	2–2	0–2	4–0	1–1
Gent	4–0	0–3	1–3	4–1	2–0	3–2	1–1	0–2		4–2	2–0	1–1	6–2	6–1	2–3	4–2	1–5	2–3
Harelbeke	1–1	2–2	1–0	0–5	1–1	4–1	3–0	1–2	1–2		0–3	2–3	5–1	5–2	1–1	3–2	3–4	3–1
Lierse	5–2	0–3	3–1	1–3	1–0	2–0	2–2	5–0	2–1	2–0		1–2	4–0	5–1	1–0	0–0	1–0	7–0
Lokeren	5–1	2–3	1–1	5–2	2–5	1–1	0–0	1–2	0–4	2–0	5–1		2–1	0–2	3–2	3–0	5–3	0–0
Lommel	3–3	3–3	2–2	0–0	0–0	1–1	1–1	0–1	1–3	0–2	1–0	1–0		0–2	0–4	4–1	2–1	2–2
Mechelen	2–0	2–5	2–0	3–1	0–0	2–1	1–1	2–0	0–2	4–0	4–3	0–0	1–0		1–3	3–2	2–4	2–2
Mouscron	1–1	0–2	1–1	3–0	1–2	2–1	3–1	5–0	5–3	4–2	3–3	0–0	0–0	2–0		3–0	1–3	2–1
Sint-Truiden	1–5	0–4	2–0	0–2	0–1	2–2	1–1	0–5	0–0	2–0	2–1	1–1	2–0	3–1	0–0		2–0	2–1
Standard Liège	3–1	0–0	1–0	3–1	0–1	1–3	3–0	5–1	0–2	1–3	3–1	1–2	4–1	2–1	2–0	2–1		4–0
Westerlo	3–2	5–0	3–2	3–2	1–0	1–1	4–1	6–6	4–2	4–1	0–2	3–3	1–0	8–0	3–0	3–2	2–1	

Legend: Blue = home team win; Yellow = draw; Red = away team win.

== Top goal scorers ==
Scorer	Goals	Team
(Norway) Ole Martin Årst	30	Gent
(Belgium) Toni Brogno	30	Westerlo
(Czech Republic) Jan Koller	20	Anderlecht
(Belgium) David Paas	19	Harelbeke
(Belgium) Eric Van Meir	15	Lierse
(Canada) Tomasz Radzinski	14	Anderlecht
(Belgium) Dante Brogno	14	Charleroi
(Poland) Marcin Żewłakow	14	Mouscron
(Sweden) Pär Zetterberg	14	Anderlecht

== Attendances ==
No.	Club	Average attendance	Change	Highest
1	Anderlecht	24,810	18,8%	26,802
2	Genk	20,190	42,1%	21,728
3	Standard de Liège	16,801	26,7%	27,414
4	Club Brugge	14,447	17,6%	21,600
5	Charleroi	10,006	119,2%	25,000
6	Mouscron	8,888	15,4%	12,000
7	Lierse	8,876	19,4%	12,500
8	Gent	8,566	21,2%	13,868
9	Mechelen	8,036	71,2%	12,000
10	Germinal Beerschot	7,265	81,6%	12,000
11	STVV	7,147	0,8%	14,000
12	Westerlo	7,018	13,5%	10,500
13	Geel	6,382	108,2%	10,500
14	Eendracht Aalst	6,121	5,6%	10,000
15	Lommel	5,441	-2,1%	12,000
16	Harelbeke	5,176	-7,6%	9,000
17	Lokeren	5,097	-9,0%	10,000
18	Beveren	4,718	3,5%	10,000

== See also ==
- 1999–2000 in Belgian football
