= 1998–99 Belgian First Division =

96th season of top-tier football in Belgium

Belgian First Division
- Season: 1998–1999
- Champions: Racing Genk
- Relegated: Kortrijk; Oostende
- Champions League: Racing Genk
- UEFA Cup: Club Brugge; R.S.C. Anderlecht
- Matches: 306
- Goals: 972 (3.18 per match)
- Top goalscorer: Jan Koller (24)

The 1998–99 season of the Jupiler League was held between August 21, 1998, and May 16, 1999. Racing Genk became champions.

== Promoted teams ==
Location of teams in Belgian First Division 1998–99

These teams were promoted from the second division at the start of the season:

- Oostende (second division champions)
- Kortrijk (playoff winner)

== Relegated teams ==
These teams were relegated to the second division at the end of the season:

- Kortrijk
- Oostende

== Genk's title success ==
After a deceiving start of the competition Anderlecht managed to come back at the top of the ranking under the management of Jean Dockx and Franky Vercauteren even beating its long-time rival Standard Liège in a memorable 0-6 demonstration. Two matches before the end of the season, the ranking was as such:

Pos	Team	Pld	Pts
1.	Genk	32	70
2.	Brugge	32	68
3.	Anderlecht	32	64

Those three teams were thus still able to win the championship. While Club Brugge lost its game to Mouscron 2-0, Anderlecht secured a 2-5 win to Genk. However the Racing did win its last match at Harelbeke and it thus became champion.

== Battle for Europe ==
With Genk qualifying for the UEFA Champions League, Anderlecht and Brugge entered the UEFA Cup.

== The relegation dog fight ==
Lommel avoided relegation by winning its last match 2-1 to Charleroi while the newcomer Kortrijk lost to Anderlecht. The other newcomer (Oostende) was already relegated at this moment.

== Final league table ==
Pos	Team	Pld	W	D	L	GF	GA	GD	Pts	Qualification or relegation
1	Genk (C)	34	22	7	5	74	38	+36	73	Qualification to Champions League second qualifying round
2	Club Brugge	34	22	5	7	65	38	+27	71	Qualification to UEFA Cup qualifying round
3	Anderlecht	34	21	7	6	76	39	+37	70	Qualification to UEFA Cup qualifying round
4	Mouscron	34	19	9	6	76	47	+29	66	
5	Lokeren	34	17	6	11	69	61	+8	57	Qualification to Intertoto Cup second round
6	Standard Liège	34	17	3	14	55	47	+8	54	
7	Lierse	34	16	6	12	72	47	+25	54	Qualification to UEFA Cup first round
8	Gent	34	14	10	10	55	59	−4	52	
9	Sint-Truiden	34	14	9	11	52	46	+6	51	Qualification to Intertoto Cup first round
10	Germinal Ekeren	34	14	7	13	48	46	+2	49	
11	Harelbeke	34	10	11	13	44	46	−2	41	
12	Westerlo	34	11	7	16	56	62	−6	40	
13	Eendracht Aalst	34	9	8	17	48	66	−18	35	
14	Charleroi	34	7	11	16	40	54	−14	32	
15	Beveren	34	8	6	20	33	60	−27	30	
16	Lommel	34	7	7	20	33	56	−23	28	
17	Kortrijk (R)	34	6	7	21	49	81	−32	25	Relegation to 1999–2000 Belgian Second Division
18	Oostende (R)	34	4	10	20	27	79	−52	22	Relegation to 1999–2000 Belgian Second Division

(C) Champions; (R) Relegated

== Results ==
Home \ Away	AAL	AND	BEV	CLU	CHA	EKE	GNK	GNT	HAR	KOR	LIE	LOK	LOM	MOU	OST	STV	STA	WES
Eendracht Aalst		0–0	0–1	0–2	2–2	5–0	1–2	0–2	2–2	1–1	1–4	3–3	3–1	1–4	4–0	1–3	1–0	3–2
Anderlecht	2–1		3–1	2–3	1–1	2–0	3–2	4–0	3–1	3–1	2–0	1–1	3–0	1–1	3–0	1–1	0–1	3–2
Beveren	0–2	2–1		1–2	1–2	2–1	1–0	0–3	0–3	2–2	1–3	1–2	0–0	1–4	5–0	0–1	0–6	1–0
Club Brugge	0–0	2–0	3–1		3–2	2–1	2–0	1–0	1–0	3–0	3–1	4–0	0–1	0–0	2–0	3–2	1–1	5–3
Charleroi	0–1	0–2	1–2	1–2		2–2	1–1	1–1	2–1	2–1	5–0	2–1	1–1	1–3	1–1	2–1	1–0	1–3
Germinal Ekeren	1–0	0–3	1–0	2–0	2–0		0–2	8–1	0–2	2–1	1–1	1–1	1–0	1–1	2–2	1–0	0–1	0–3
Genk	2–0	2–5	1–0	1–1	2–1	3–2		1–0	2–2	3–1	3–1	3–1	6–0	3–0	3–0	4–1	2–1	3–0
Gent	2–2	3–2	4–1	0–4	1–1	1–3	0–1		0–0	3–1	1–0	2–1	2–2	3–0	1–1	1–1	3–2	2–0
Harelbeke	5–1	1–2	1–1	0–2	1–1	0–4	1–2	2–2		1–0	3–1	3–2	1–1	0–4	2–1	1–1	1–1	1–2
Kortrijk	3–4	0–4	1–0	2–4	2–2	1–2	1–3	3–4	0–0		3–2	0–6	4–1	2–2	2–0	2–2	1–3	4–2
Lierse	3–1	0–0	3–0	5–2	4–0	1–0	1–1	1–2	3–1	5–1		2–3	2–1	1–2	4–2	6–0	3–0	5–1
Lokeren	6–2	2–3	4–3	2–0	3–1	1–1	2–0	1–4	1–0	2–1	2–0		2–1	0–0	1–2	2–1	4–1	3–0
Lommel	0–3	2–2	2–1	2–1	2–1	1–2	0–3	0–1	0–1	3–1	0–0	1–2		2–3	3–0	0–1	3–0	0–1
Mouscron	3–1	2–3	1–0	2–0	3–2	2–2	3–5	7–1	2–2	3–1	0–0	5–1	2–0		2–1	5–1	1–5	2–1
Oostende	4–1	0–2	1–1	1–4	0–0	0–1	1–1	2–2	1–0	1–3	0–6	0–0	1–1	2–4		0–1	2–1	1–1
Sint-Truiden	2–0	1–4	1–1	1–1	1–0	2–0	2–2	1–0	1–0	2–2	3–0	7–0	2–1	0–2	5–0		0–1	0–0
Standard Liège	3–0	0–6	1–2	3–0	2–0	1–0	2–4	2–0	0–2	2–1	2–2	2–4	1–0	2–0	3–0	2–0		2–0
Westerlo	1–1	6–0	0–0	1–2	1–0	2–4	1–1	3–3	0–3	2–0	0–2	4–3	2–1	1–1	7–0	1–4	3–1	

Legend: Blue = home team win; Yellow = draw; Red = away team win.

== Top scorers ==
Scorer	Goals	Team
(Czech Republic) Jan Koller	24	Lokeren
(Belgium) Branko Strupar	18	Genk
(Guinea) Souleymane Oularé	17	Genk
(Croatia) Zoran Ban	16	Mouscron
(Canada) Tomasz Radzinski	15	Anderlecht
(Belgium) Jochen Janssen	15	Westerlo
(Belgium) Filip Fiers	15	Sint-Truidense
(Belgium) Eric Van Meir	14	Lierse

== Attendances ==
No.	Club	Average attendance	Change	Highest
1	Anderlecht	20,891	-2,2%	25,485
2	Genk	14,211	33,7%	17,000
3	Standard de Liège	13,265	9,7%	25,000
4	Club Brugge	12,284	-3,3%	26,000
5	Mouscron	7,700	3,0%	8,500
6	Lierse	7,435	-8,4%	12,000
7	STVV	7,088	-4,0%	14,000
8	Gent	7,066	-3,1%	9,000
9	Westerlo	6,182	-2,1%	10,500
10	Eendracht Aalst	5,794	-17,0%	9,000
11	Lokeren	5,600	6,4%	10,000
12	Harelbeke	5,600	8,2%	8,500
13	Lommel	5,559	-14,9%	12,500
14	Kortrijk	4,780	70,0%	9,000
15	Charleroi	4,565	-25,0%	7,000
16	Beveren	4,559	-17,3%	8,500
17	Germinal Ekeren	4,000	-18,6%	8,000
18	Oostende	3,968	23,8%	10,000

== See also ==
- 1998–99 in Belgian football
