= Sadio Ba =

Belgian footballer (born 1973)

Personal information
- Full name: Sadio Ba
- Date of birth: 24 January 1973 (age 53)
- Place of birth: Ghent, Belgium
- Height: 1.81 m (5 ft 11 in)
- Position: Right midfielder

Senior career*
Years	Team	Apps	(Gls)
1992–1993	Lokeren	1	(0)
1993–1996	Standard Wetteren	0	(0)
1996–1998	Hamme	56	(3)
1998–1999	FC Denderleeuw	32	(1)
1999–2000	Westerlo	24	(0)
2000	LASK Linz	4	(0)
2000–2005	Westerlo	123	(3)
2005–2007	Verbroedering Geel	28	(0)
2007–2009	Beveren	11	(0)
2009–2010	KVC Willebroek-Meerhof		

Managerial career
- 2009–2011: KVC Willebroek-Meerhof
- 2011–2012: K.R.C. Mechelen
- 2012–2013: Woluwe-Zaventem
- 2013–2014: RWDM Brussels FC (assistant manager)
- * Club domestic league appearances and goals

Sadio Ba (born 24 January 1973) is a retired Belgian football player and currently football coach. He played as a right midfielder.

Ba previously played with K.V.C. Westerlo for several seasons in the Belgian First Division.

== Honours ==
Westerlo

- Belgian Cup: 2000–01
