= Michel Piraux =

Belgian football referee

- Born: 15 October 1955 (age 71)

Domestic
| Years | League | Role |
| 1989–2001 | Belgian Pro League | Referee |

International
| Years | League | Role |
| 1991–2001 | FIFA–listed | Referee |

Michel Piraux (born 15 October 1955) is a former Belgian professional football referee. He was a full international for FIFA from 1991 until 2001. He refereed the 2000 Belgian Cup Final between Genk and Standard Liège.
