= Bart Deelkens =

Belgian footballer

Personal information
- Date of birth: 25 April 1978 (age 48)
- Place of birth: Hasselt, Belgium
- Height: 1.89 m (6 ft 2 in)
- Position: Goalkeeper

Team information
- Current team: KFC Oosterwijk

Senior career*
Years	Team	Apps	(Gls)
1998–2005	Westerlo	111	(0)
2005	MVV Maastricht	5	(0)
2006–2007	Sint-Truiden	35	(0)
2007–2008	KSK Beveren	35	(0)
2008–2013	KVC Westerlo	43	(0)
2013–	KFC Oosterwijk	80	(0)
- * Club domestic league appearances and goals as of 5 November 2015

Bart Deelkens (born 25 April 1978) is a Belgian football goalkeeper who currently plays for KFC Oosterwijk.

== Honours ==
Westerlo

- Belgian Cup: 2000–01
