= FC Wezel Sport =

Association football club in Mol, Belgium

Wezel Sport
- Full name: Football Club Wezel Sport
- Founded: 1921; 105 years ago, as FC Vieille Montagne; 2010; 16 years ago, as FC Wezel Sport
- Ground: G. Claesstadion, Mol
- Capacity: 2,000
- League: Belgian Division 3
- 2024–25: Belgian Division 2 VV B, 16th of 16 (relegated)
- Website: www.wezelsport.be
Home colours

Football Club Wezel Sport is a Belgian football club based in Mol, Antwerp Province. The club's first team play their home games at G. Claesstadion. The club colours, reflected in their crest and kits, are red, white and blue. Formed in 1921, the club has spent most of its existence in the provincial tiers with some extended stints in the national divisions. It has matricule number 844, and is part of the Royal Belgian Football Association (KBVB).

== History ==
FC Wezel Sport originated from the factory team of zinc mine Vieille Montagne in Wezel. Initially playing in the Kempische Voetbalbond, the club joined the Royal Belgian Football Association (RBFA) in 1926, receiving the matricule number 844. The club played on factory grounds until 1935 when a new pitch was built.

In 1937, the club reached the national promotion series (third level), winning their series in their debut season and advancing to the second level in 1938. However, they finished last and were relegated back to the third level in 1939. Despite World War II interruptions, the club remained in the third tier until 1949 when they were relegated to regional leagues.

The club quickly returned to the national promotion series in 1950 but faced another relegation in 1952. A new Fourth Division was introduced, allowing the club to continue their stint in the national divisions. They fluctuated between levels, achieving promotions and facing relegations in subsequent years. They played in the third tier under legendary manager Guy Thys until they were relegated in 1969. By 1972, they dropped to the Belgian Provincial Leagues, returning briefly to the fourth level in 1978 but relegating again in 1982.

In the 1990s, Wezel Sport resurged, returning to the national fourth division in 1993. They consistently finished near the top, achieving promotion to the third level in 1999. However, in 2002, they faced relegation and merged with KSV Mol to form KFC Racing Mol-Wezel, which played in the provincial leagues.

KFC Racing Mol-Wezel experienced success, returning to the fourth level in 2004 and advancing to the third level in 2007. Financial difficulties arose, leading to a collaboration with KVSK United Overpelt-Lommel in 2009, though the original registration number 844 remained. A new club, Wezel Sport FC, was formed in 2010 after dissatisfaction among members of the former club, and later merged back with KFC Wezel to form FC Wezel Sport.

Former Belgium international Sepp De Roover managed the team between 2020 and 2022, and achieved promotion from the Belgian First Provincial to the Belgian Division 3. In 2022, Wim Mennes took over as head coach, and led the team to a second successive promotion to the fourth-tier Belgian Division 2 in 2023.
