= 2001–02 Belgian First Division =

99th season of top-tier football in Belgium

Belgian First Division
- Season: 2001–02
- Champions: Genk
- Relegated: Molenbeek; Eendracht Aalst
- Champions League: Genk; Club Brugge
- UEFA Cup: Anderlecht; Mouscron
- Matches: 306
- Goals: 973 (3.18 per match)
- Top goalscorer: Wesley Sonck (30 goals)

The 2001–02 season of the Jupiler League began on August 11, 2001, and ended on May 5, 2002. Racing Genk became champions.

== Promoted teams ==
Location of teams in Belgian First Division 2001–02

These teams were promoted from the second division at the start of the season:

- Lommel (second division champion)
- R.W.D. Molenbeek (playoff winner)

== Relegated teams ==
These teams were relegated to the second division at the end of the season:

- Eendracht Aalst (no license)
- R.W.D. Molenbeek (no license)

== Final league table ==
Pos	Team	Pld	W	D	L	GF	GA	GD	Pts	Qualification or relegation
1	Genk (C)	34	20	12	2	85	43	+42	72	Qualification to Champions League third qualifying round
2	Club Brugge	34	22	4	8	74	41	+33	70	Qualification to Champions League second qualifying round
3	Anderlecht	34	18	12	4	71	37	+34	66	Qualification to UEFA Cup first round
4	Gent	34	16	10	8	62	51	+11	58	Qualified for Intertoto Cup second round
5	Standard Liège	34	15	12	7	57	38	+19	57	
6	Mouscron	34	17	5	12	68	40	+28	56	Qualification to UEFA Cup qualifying round
7	Sporting Lokeren	34	15	10	9	43	33	+10	55	Qualified for Intertoto Cup first round
8	Sint-Truiden	34	16	5	13	52	47	+5	53	
9	Germinal Beerschot	34	11	16	7	68	51	+17	49	
10	Molenbeek (Note: R.W.D. Molenbeek were relegated to the Third Division as they were refused a Belgian professional licence.) (R)	34	13	5	16	50	59	−9	44	Relegation to 2002–03 Belgian Third Division
11	La Louvière	34	12	8	14	41	52	−11	44	
12	Charleroi	34	11	6	17	40	63	−23	39	
13	Lommel	34	10	9	15	54	66	−12	39	
14	Westerlo	34	9	9	16	49	61	−12	36	
15	Lierse	34	9	8	17	55	65	−10	35	
16	Antwerp	34	7	10	17	47	67	−20	31	
17	Eendracht Aalst (Note: Eendracht Aalst were relegated to the Third Division as they were refused a Belgian professional licence.) (R)	34	4	9	21	32	73	−41	21	Relegation to 2002–03 Belgian Third Division
18	Beveren	34	2	8	24	30	91	−61	14	

(C) Champions; (R) Relegated

== Results ==
Home \ Away	AAL	AND	ANT	GBA	BEV	CLU	CHA	GNK	GNT	LIE	LOK	LOM	LOU	MOL	MOU	STV	STA	WES
Eendracht Aalst		1–5	0–0	3–3	0–1	1–1	1–1	0–0	1–3	0–2	2–1	0–1	0–0	2–4	0–5	1–1	1–2	0–1
Anderlecht	3–1		3–0	1–0	3–0	1–0	2–1	3–3	2–0	7–1	0–0	2–0	5–2	2–2	4–2	0–2	0–0	3–3
Antwerp	2–0	2–2		2–3	4–0	1–2	2–0	3–0	2–3	1–4	1–1	3–3	0–0	1–2	2–1	4–1	0–0	1–1
Germinal Beerschot	4–0	1–1	2–0		4–1	1–2	4–1	1–1	3–2	2–0	0–0	3–0	8–2	2–2	2–2	1–0	2–2	1–1
Beveren	0–4	1–4	2–3	1–1		0–4	1–1	1–6	2–2	1–1	0–2	0–2	0–3	1–3	0–1	3–2	1–1	1–1
Club Brugge	3–0	1–0	4–1	3–2	6–1		1–0	1–2	0–1	3–1	2–4	3–1	2–1	1–1	2–0	2–0	1–3	4–2
Charleroi	2–1	1–1	5–0	1–0	1–1	0–4		0–3	0–3	3–1	1–0	1–3	2–1	3–1	0–2	0–3	0–0	4–2
Genk	5–0	1–1	2–1	4–4	5–1	3–2	3–2		2–1	4–2	3–3	4–2	5–1	2–0	3–1	2–2	1–1	2–0
Gent	2–2	2–2	3–3	1–1	2–1	2–2	3–0	0–0		2–3	1–1	0–0	2–1	3–5	1–1	4–2	2–5	4–1
Lierse	3–1	2–0	2–1	1–1	3–3	0–2	1–2	1–2	1–2		1–1	6–3	0–1	1–2	3–3	0–2	1–1	4–1
Lokeren	1–0	0–1	0–0	3–2	1–0	0–1	1–0	2–2	0–1	2–1		1–0	2–2	4–0	2–1	0–1	1–1	2–0
Lommel	1–1	2–2	2–2	2–2	3–1	0–2	5–1	1–5	2–4	2–2	3–4		3–0	1–0	3–2	0–1	1–1	3–0
La Louvière	1–3	1–3	3–0	1–1	3–2	1–2	2–1	0–0	3–1	0–0	0–1	0–0		1–0	1–0	1–0	3–1	3–3
Molenbeek	4–3	2–3	2–0	2–2	3–0	2–3	0–1	2–5	0–1	1–0	1–0	0–1	1–0		1–1	1–2	2–1	0–1
Mouscron	6–1	1–1	5–1	3–1	3–0	2–0	0–1	2–4	0–1	2–0	4–0	1–0	2–0	4–1		3–0	2–0	1–2
Sint-Truiden	3–1	0–2	3–1	2–2	4–2	5–3	2–1	0–1	0–1	0–2	1–0	4–3	1–0	1–2	1–2		1–1	2–0
Standard Liège	2–0	1–0	4–2	3–0	4–1	1–1	6–0	2–0	0–1	2–1	0–2	2–1	1–2	2–1	2–1	1–3		2–2
Westerlo	0–1	1–2	2–1	1–2	1–0	1–4	3–3	0–0	3–1	5–4	0–1	6–0	0–1	4–0	0–2	0–0	1–2	

Legend: Blue = home team win; Yellow = draw; Red = away team win.

== Top goal scorers ==
Scorer	Goals	Team
(Belgium) Wesley Sonck	30	Genk
(Sierra Leone) Paul Kpaka	25	Germinal Beerschot
(Burkina Faso) Moumouni Dagano	21	Genk
(Norway) Rune Lange	19	Club Brugge
(Greece) Alexandros Kaklamanos	17	Gent
(Belgium) Patrick Goots	16	Royal Antwerp
(Peru) Andrés Mendoza	15	Club Brugge
(Poland) Marcin Żewłakow	15	Mouscron

== Attendances ==
No.	Club	Average attendance	Change	Highest
1	Anderlecht	23,622	-5,0%	25,952
2	Genk	20,790	7,4%	23,624
3	Club Brugge	17,854	8,8%	25,250
4	Standard de Liège	12,729	-20,3%	23,000
5	Charleroi	9,738	-12,2%	17,000
6	Gent	8,967	15,0%	11,500
7	Mouscron	8,500	-5,3%	12,000
8	Germinal Beerschot	8,403	13,7%	11,500
9	STVV	7,294	-4,3%	12,000
10	Lierse	6,688	-18,8%	9,000
11	Lommel	6,047	51,6%	12,000
12	Antwerp	5,712	-8,8%	11,000
13	Westerlo	5,324	-13,6%	11,000
14	Sporting Lokeren	5,280	-2,7%	8,500
15	Molenbeek	5,126	109,0%	12,000
16	RAAL	5,059	-30,9%	10,500
17	Beveren	4,247	-22,9%	10,000
18	Eendracht Aalst	3,791	-28,8%	9,000

== See also ==
- 2001–02 in Belgian football
