= 1996–97 Belgian First Division =

94th season of top-tier football in Belgium

Belgian First Division
- Season: 1996–97

Lierse won the title of the 1996–97 season.

== Participanting teams ==
Location of teams in Belgian First Division 1996–97

These teams were relegated to the second division at the end of the season:

- KV Mechelen
- Cercle Brugge

== Final league table ==
Pos	Team	Pld	W	D	L	GF	GA	GD	Pts	Qualification or relegation
1	Lierse S.K.	34	21	10	3	70	38	+32	73	Qualified for 1997–98 UEFA Champions League
2	Club Brugge	34	22	5	7	69	34	+35	71	Qualified for 1997–98 UEFA Cup
3	R.E. Mouscron	34	17	10	7	60	38	+22	61	Qualified for 1997–98 UEFA Cup
4	R.S.C. Anderlecht	34	16	10	8	59	36	+23	58	Qualified for 1997–98 UEFA Cup
5	K.F.C. Lommel S.K.	34	16	9	9	50	48	+2	57	Qualified for 1997 UEFA Intertoto Cup
6	R. Antwerp F.C.	34	16	5	13	51	49	+2	53	Qualified for 1997 UEFA Intertoto Cup
7	Standard Liège	34	16	2	16	55	55	0	50	Qualified for 1997 UEFA Intertoto Cup
8	K.R.C. Genk	34	13	9	12	49	43	+6	48	Qualified for 1997 UEFA Intertoto Cup
9	K.R.C. Zuid-West-Vlaanderen	34	12	11	11	50	42	+8	47	
10	K.F.C. Germinal Beerschot	34	13	7	14	56	57	−1	46	Qualified for 1997–98 UEFA Cup Winners' Cup
11	K. Sint-Truidense V.V.	34	10	9	15	46	56	−10	39	
12	K.S.C. Lokeren Oost-Vlaanderen	34	10	8	16	41	57	−16	38	
13	R. Charleroi S.C.	34	10	7	17	44	58	−14	37	
14	K.A.A. Gent	34	10	6	18	44	58	−14	36	
15	K.S.C. Eendracht Aalst	34	8	12	14	44	55	−11	36	
16	R.W.D. Molenbeek	34	8	11	15	32	43	−11	35	
17	Y.R. K.V. Mechelen	34	7	10	17	33	55	−22	31	Relegated to Division II
18	Cercle Brugge K.S.V.	34	6	9	19	36	67	−31	27	Relegated to Division II

== Results ==
Home \ Away	AAL	AND	ANT	CER	CLU	CHA	EKE	GNK	GNT	HAR	LIE	LOK	LOM	MEC	MOL	MOU	STV	STA
Eendracht Aalst		0–0	1–2	4–2	1–1	2–2	5–0	1–3	1–0	1–1	1–2	2–0	1–1	3–1	1–1	0–0	3–3	1–2
Anderlecht	3–0		2–3	4–0	0–1	6–0	4–1	3–1	2–1	3–2	0–0	2–2	6–0	0–0	0–1	1–1	3–1	2–1
Antwerp	1–0	0–2		0–0	2–1	3–1	2–0	4–0	3–1	0–0	0–1	4–1	1–4	3–2	3–2	1–2	1–2	3–0
Cercle Brugge	1–2	0–3	0–1		0–2	1–0	2–3	0–4	1–0	1–2	0–2	2–6	3–1	1–2	1–1	2–2	1–1	2–4
Club Brugge	3–0	2–1	4–2	3–0		2–1	2–0	2–1	1–0	1–0	2–4	8–2	3–2	2–0	1–0	3–0	6–1	3–0
Charleroi	2–3	0–0	3–0	1–3	3–0		4–1	1–0	1–0	0–1	1–1	3–1	1–3	1–0	1–1	2–1	1–1	1–2
Germinal Ekeren	6–1	4–1	6–3	2–2	0–0	1–0		0–1	1–2	1–3	1–1	1–0	4–1	2–2	0–0	1–1	3–1	4–0
Genk	1–1	3–2	3–0	2–0	1–1	1–4	3–1		4–2	4–1	1–1	0–1	0–1	0–1	3–1	0–0	1–1	3–1
Gent	3–2	1–2	0–0	2–1	1–3	3–1	2–0	0–1		1–4	4–5	1–2	2–1	2–2	2–0	2–4	1–1	2–1
Harelbeke	0–0	0–0	2–1	3–1	2–0	0–0	2–3	2–1	1–1		3–1	5–1	0–2	3–3	3–0	2–2	1–1	2–3
Lierse	0–1	5–1	1–0	4–2	2–2	4–0	0–0	5–2	2–1	1–0		3–0	3–2	4–2	2–1	1–0	2–1	2–1
Lokeren	2–2	0–1	0–2	1–3	1–1	4–2	0–1	1–0	1–0	0–0	0–1		3–3	4–0	0–0	0–2	1–1	0–1
Lommel	2–2	1–1	1–0	1–1	2–0	2–1	3–2	0–0	2–2	1–0	1–1	1–0		1–0	2–0	0–2	2–1	1–0
Mechelen	1–0	0–2	0–0	0–0	0–2	1–1	3–0	0–0	1–1	2–1	2–2	0–1	0–1		0–2	0–2	0–2	3–0
Molenbeek	2–0	0–0	1–2	2–0	1–3	1–3	0–1	2–2	1–2	2–2	0–0	0–1	0–0	3–1		2–0	2–1	1–1
Mouscron	3–2	1–1	2–2	1–1	1–0	3–1	1–4	2–0	3–0	1–0	2–2	2–1	3–0	4–0	2–0		5–0	2–1
Sint-Truiden	1–0	4–0	0–2	0–0	2–1	2–0	3–1	1–1	1–2	1–2	4–2	0–1	2–4	2–3	0–2	2–0		2–0
Standard Liège	3–0	0–1	4–0	1–2	1–3	4–1	2–1	0–2	2–0	2–0	0–3	3–3	3–1	3–1	3–0	4–3	2–0	

Legend: Blue = home team win; Yellow = draw; Red = away team win.

== Attendances ==
#	Club	Average
1	Anderlecht	21,353
2	Club Brugge	12,706
3	Standard	12,088
4	Genk	10,629
5	Lierse	8,118
6	Mouscron	7,476
7	STVV	7,382
8	Gent	7,294
9	Aalst	6,982
10	Lommel	6,529
11	Westerlo	6,312
12	Charleroi	6,088
13	Beveren	5,512
14	Lokeren	5,265
15	Harelbeke	5,176
16	Ekeren	4,912
17	RWDM	4,647
18	Antwerp	3,941
