= Jef Delen =

Belgian footballer

Personal information
- Full name: Jef Delen
- Date of birth: 29 June 1976 (age 50)
- Place of birth: Bonheiden, Belgium
- Height: 1.78 m (5 ft 10 in)
- Position: Winger

Youth career
- BO Beerzel

Senior career*
Years	Team	Apps	(Gls)
1996–1998	FC Tielen	25	(4)
1998	KV Mechelen	9	(0)
1998–2000	V. Geel	65	(12)
2000–2012	VC Westerlo	326	(29)
- * Club domestic league appearances and goals as of 13 May 2011

Jef Delen (born 29 June 1976 in Bonheiden) is a Belgian former professional football player. He usually plays as a left winger.

Delen had been captain of Westerlo since the 2006-07 season. He was widely regarded as the Flemish Ryan Giggs.

== Honours ==
Westerlo

- Belgian Cup: 2000-01
