= 2000–01 Belgian First Division =

98th season of top-tier football in Belgium

Belgian First Division
- Season: 2000–01
- Champions: Anderlecht
- Relegated: Harelbeke; Mechelen
- Champions League: Anderlecht
- UEFA Cup: Club Brugge; Standard Liège; Westerlo
- Matches: 306
- Goals: 930 (3.04 per match)
- Top goalscorer: Tomasz Radzinski (23 goals)

The 2000–01 season of the Jupiler League began on August 12, 2000, and ended on May 20, 2001. Anderlecht became champions.

== Promoted teams ==
Location of teams in Belgian First Division 2000–01

These teams were promoted from the second division at the start of the season:

- Antwerp (second division champion)
- Louviéroise (playoff winner)

== Relegated teams ==
These teams were relegated to the second division at the end of the season:

- Harelbeke
- KV Mechelen

== Final league table ==
Pos	Team	Pld	W	D	L	GF	GA	GD	Pts	Qualification or relegation
1	Anderlecht (C)	34	25	8	1	88	25	+63	83	Qualification to Champions League second qualifying round
2	Club Brugge	34	23	9	2	83	24	+59	78	Qualification to UEFA Cup qualifying round
3	Standard Liège	34	16	12	6	71	44	+27	60	Qualification to UEFA Cup qualifying round
4	Sporting Lokeren	34	16	9	9	58	41	+17	57	Qualification to Intertoto Cup first round
5	Gent	34	16	9	9	61	49	+12	57	Qualification to Intertoto Cup second round
6	Germinal Beerschot	34	17	3	14	62	53	+9	54	
7	Mouscron	34	15	8	11	63	49	+14	53	
8	Westerlo	34	15	8	11	61	53	+8	53	Qualification to UEFA Cup first round
9	Charleroi	34	14	5	15	51	65	−14	47	
10	Lierse	34	12	7	15	44	51	−7	43	
11	Genk	34	11	9	14	45	51	−6	42	
12	Antwerp	34	11	7	16	38	45	−7	40	
13	Sint-Truiden	34	9	8	17	44	54	−10	35	
14	Beveren	34	9	8	17	30	64	−34	35	
15	La Louvière	34	6	12	16	32	56	−24	30	
16	Eendracht Aalst	34	7	8	19	33	65	−32	29	
17	Harelbeke (R)	34	8	4	22	36	79	−43	28	Relegation to 2001–02 Belgian Second Division
18	Mechelen (R)	34	4	10	20	40	72	−32	22	Relegation to 2001–02 Belgian Second Division

(C) Champions; (R) Relegated

== Results ==
Home \ Away	AAL	AND	ANT	GBA	BEV	CLU	CHA	GNK	GNT	HAR	LIE	LOK	LOU	MEC	MOU	STV	STA	WES
Eendracht Aalst		1–5	0–4	2–0	1–1	0–2	4–0	4–2	1–4	0–0	1–3	2–2	1–0	1–3	1–0	4–1	1–1	1–2
Anderlecht	3–0		2–0	7–0	4–0	2–0	7–2	1–0	2–1	4–3	5–2	8–0	2–0	1–0	3–3	3–2	0–0	3–2
Antwerp	0–0	0–3		1–2	0–1	0–1	1–1	1–0	1–0	2–0	0–0	2–1	1–1	3–1	1–0	2–0	1–2	1–3
Germinal Beerschot	2–0	0–1	3–1		2–0	2–3	0–2	5–1	1–3	2–1	6–0	2–0	3–1	4–1	4–1	1–0	1–0	3–1
Beveren	1–0	1–3	2–1	2–1		0–2	1–2	2–0	1–1	2–1	2–1	0–2	0–1	1–1	0–0	0–0	0–3	1–4
Club Brugge	1–1	0–1	2–0	2–2	6–0		1–0	6–0	6–2	0–0	1–0	3–1	3–0	5–2	2–2	5–0	1–1	2–2
Charleroi	0–0	0–4	1–0	2–1	5–0	0–4		2–1	4–3	5–0	2–0	1–0	2–1	4–2	1–3	1–7	2–3	2–2
Genk	3–1	1–1	1–1	2–0	1–0	0–1	2–1		1–1	4–0	2–0	0–0	1–0	3–1	4–0	3–0	2–2	1–2
Gent	1–0	2–1	4–2	3–1	5–0	0–2	1–1	2–1		2–1	2–3	3–2	2–2	2–1	1–0	2–1	2–1	3–1
Harelbeke	2–4	1–4	2–0	3–0	3–2	0–6	1–0	1–2	2–1		1–0	1–6	2–2	1–0	0–1	0–4	3–4	0–4
Lierse	2–0	0–0	4–1	1–1	3–0	0–2	2–0	1–1	2–0	4–1		1–4	1–2	1–1	1–4	2–1	1–1	1–2
Lokeren	2–0	0–0	0–1	2–0	1–1	2–2	1–0	2–2	1–1	3–0	2–0		3–1	3–2	2–1	2–1	2–1	2–0
La Louvière	3–0	0–1	2–2	0–5	2–3	1–1	1–1	2–1	1–1	0–2	0–2	0–0		2–2	1–3	1–0	0–4	3–1
Mechelen	4–1	0–2	0–3	2–3	2–2	1–1	4–3	0–0	3–3	2–0	1–1	0–3	0–0		1–5	1–2	0–4	0–1
Mouscron	2–0	1–2	3–2	3–0	0–0	1–2	3–0	2–0	2–2	4–3	1–2	2–1	0–0	4–2		1–0	1–1	3–5
Sint-Truiden	1–0	0–0	1–1	3–2	1–0	1–2	1–3	2–2	0–1	1–1	0–1	2–0	1–1	1–0	1–4		1–1	1–2
Standard Liège	7–0	1–1	0–1	1–1	4–2	0–4	4–0	2–1	1–0	3–0	3–2	0–5	3–0	2–0	3–3	1–1		5–3
Westerlo	1–1	2–2	2–1	1–2	1–2	0–2	0–1	5–0	0–0	1–0	1–0	1–1	2–1	0–0	1–0	4–6	2–2	

Legend: Blue = home team win; Yellow = draw; Red = away team win.

== Top scorers ==
Scorer	Goals	Team
(Canada) Tomasz Radzinski	23	Anderlecht
(Czech Republic) Jan Koller	22	Anderlecht
(Federal Republic of Yugoslavia) Nenad Jestrović	20	Mouscron
(Belgium) Gert Verheyen	17	Club Brugge
(Poland) Marcin Żewłakow	16	Mouscron
(Norway) Ole Martin Årst	14	Standard Liège

== Attendances ==
No.	Club	Average attendance	Change	Highest
1	Anderlecht	24,861	0,2%	28,000
2	Genk	19,351	-4,2%	22,000
3	Club Brugge	16,412	13,6%	29,000
4	Standard de Liège	15,974	-4,9%	30,000
5	Charleroi	11,091	10,8%	19,100
6	Mouscron	8,971	0,9%	12,000
7	Lierse	8,235	-7,2%	11,500
8	Gent	7,800	-8,9%	12,500
9	STVV	7,618	6,6%	11,500
10	Germinal Beerschot	7,388	1,7%	10,000
11	RAAL	7,318	194,1%	12,500
12	Mechelen	6,912	-14,0%	11,000
13	Antwerp	6,265	9,5%	11,500
14	Westerlo	6,165	-12,2%	10,000
15	Beveren	5,506	16,7%	12,000
16	Sporting Lokeren	5,424	6,4%	12,000
17	Eendracht Aalst	5,324	-13,0%	10,000
18	Harelbeke	5,012	-3,2%	9,500

== See also ==
- 2000–01 in Belgian football
