= KRC Zuid-West-Vlaanderen =

Zuid-West-Vlaanderen
- Full name: KRC Zuid-West-Vlaanderen
- Nicknames: de Ratten; de Ratjes
- Founded: 1930; 96 years ago
- Dissolved: 2002; 24 years ago
- Ground: Forestiersstadion
- Capacity: 10,000
Home colours	Away colours

Koninklijke Racing Club Zuid-West-Vlaanderen was a Belgian football club from the municipality of Harelbeke, West Flanders from 1930 to 2002. It played one spell in the first division from 1995 to 2001.

== History ==
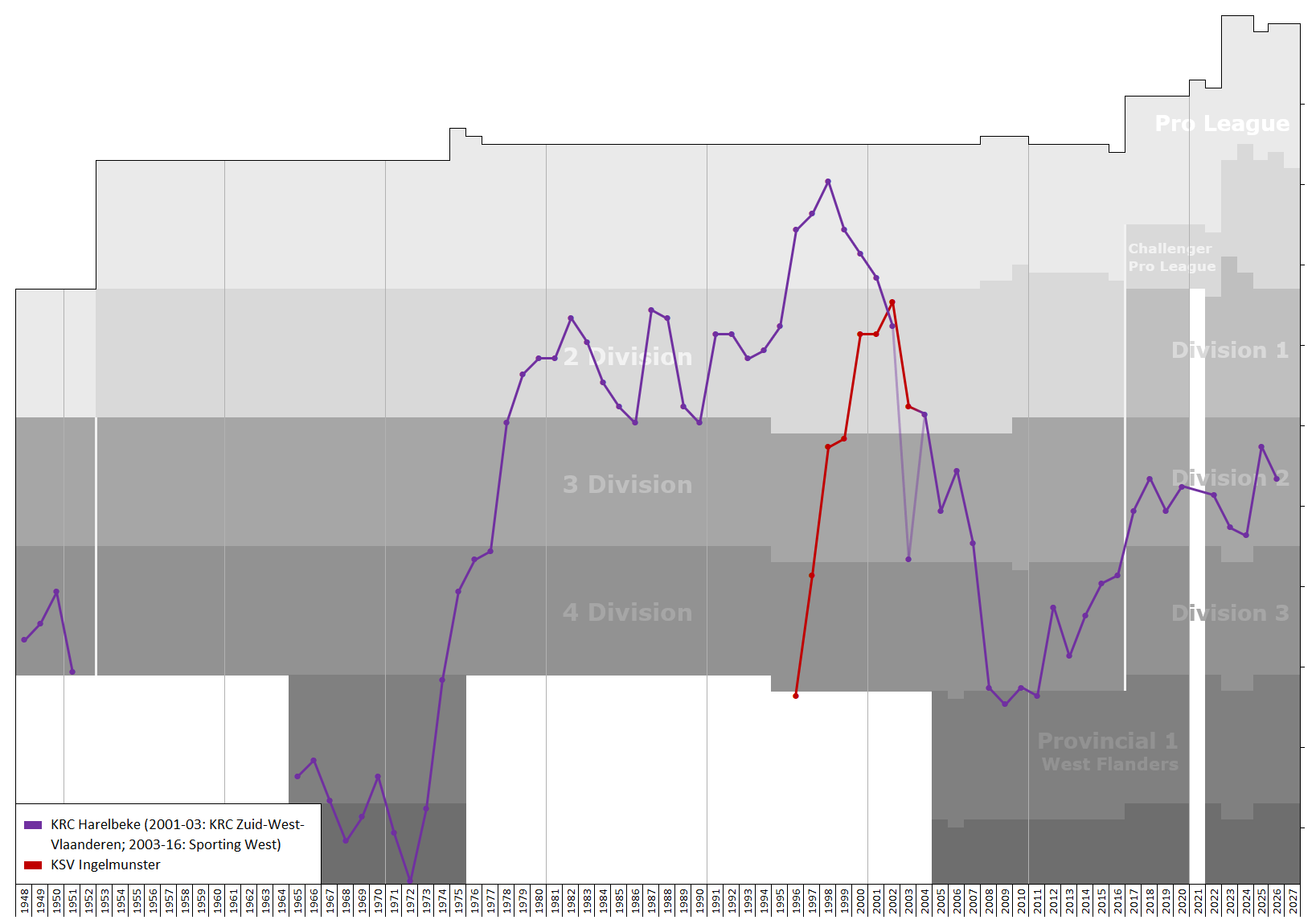
Historical chart of KRC Harelbeke league performance

Racing Club Harelbeke was founded in 1930 and it registered the same year to the Belgian Football Association to become the matricule n°1615. In 1955 the club changed its name to KRC Harelbeke. It appeared for the first time in the second division in 1978 and would eventually become a regular in that division, playing the final round four times before it won it in 1995. Harelbeke achieved its best ranking with a 5th place in 1998 right behind Anderlecht.

At the end of the 2000–01 season, the club was relegated to the second division and subsequently changed its name from KRC Harelbeke to KRC Zuid-West-Vlaanderen. The following year, the matricule n°1615 merged with KSV Ingelmunster to become KSV Ingelmunster-Zuid-West, a club now known again as KRC Harelbeke. The reason of the fusion was that Zuid-West-Vlaanderen went into liquidation after it was refused its license.

== Honours ==
- Belgian Second Division final round:
  - Winners (1): 1995
