= KFC Lommel SK =

Belgian football club

Koninklijke Football Club Lommelse Sportkring was a Belgian football club that existed between 1932 and 2003. It played two spells at the highest level in the Belgian football league system: from 1992 to 2000 and from 2001 to 2003. Its best ranking was reached in 1997 when it finished 5th.

== History ==
The club was founded in 1932 when most players of the neighbour Lommelsche V.V. (first named Lommelsche S.K.) created this club, as the former ended its activity at the beginning of the season. It became a member of the Belgian Football Association the same year, and eventually received the matricule n°1986. In 1947, the name of the club changed to Lommelse S.K., and then to K.F.C. Lommel S.K. in 1968.

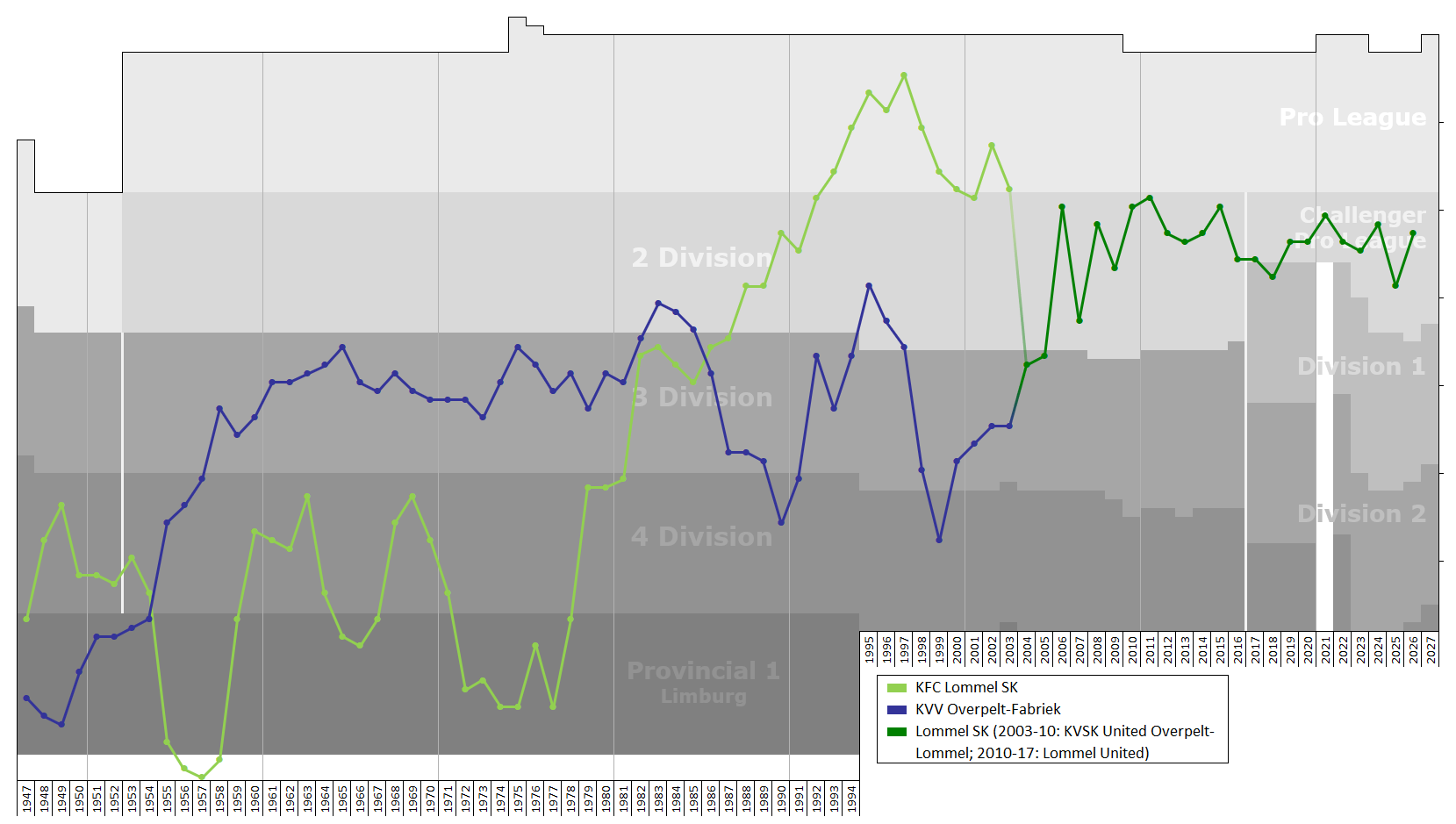
Historical chart of Lommel SK league performance

Lommel first appeared in the second division in 1987 and won the competition in 1992, two years after a third place in the second division final round. It played one more season at that level in 2000–01 to win this league again. In 2003, the club fell victim to the Commission des Licences new regulations regarding debt – the club owed several thousand euro to the Belgian FA and was unable to pay this on time. The entire first-team squad left in the face of imminent liquidation of the club. The team attempted to continue by playing its youth team but three matchdays before the end of the 2002–03 season, Lommel – still able to avoid relegation on the field – were expelled from the Jupiler League. The FA decided to erase all results involving Lommel in the first division and the final table did not include the club. The matricule 1986 disappears. Member of former club board's took contact with K.V.V. Overpelt Fabriek a club wearing the matricule n°2554 of a neighbour town.
