= 2023–24 Belgian Cup =

Tournament details
- Country: Belgium
- Dates: 29 July 2023 – 9 May 2024
- Teams: 356

Final positions
- Champions: Union SG
- Runners-up: Antwerp

Tournament statistics
- Matches played: 313

The 2023–24 Belgian Cup, called the Croky Cup for sponsorship reasons, was the 69th season of Belgium's annual football cup competition. The competition began on 29 July 2023 and ended with the final on 9 May 2024. The winners qualified for the 2024–25 UEFA Europa League play-off round. Match times up to 29 October 2023 and from 31 March 2024 were CEST (UTC+2). Times on interim ("winter") days were CET (UTC+1). Antwerp were the defending cup holders.

Union SG won the cup on 9 May 2024 (their third Belgian Cup win), defeating Antwerp 1–0 in the final.

== Competition format ==
The competition consists of eleven proper rounds. All rounds are single-match elimination rounds. When tied after 90 minutes in the first four rounds, penalties will be taken immediately. From round five, when tied after 90 minutes first an extra time period of 30 minutes will be played, then penalties are to be taken if still necessary.

Teams will enter the competition in different rounds, based upon their 2023–24 league affiliation. Teams from the fifth-level Belgian Division 3 or lower will begin in round 1, with the exception of sixteen teams from the Belgian Provincial Leagues which were randomly drawn to start in the preliminary round. Belgian Division 2 teams entered in round 2, Belgian National Division 1 teams entered in round 3, Challenger Pro League teams in round 5 and finally the Belgian Pro League teams entered in round 6. U23 teams are not eligible for the Belgian Cup and will not enter the cup.

Round	Clubs remaining	Clubs involved	Winners from previous round	New entries this round	Leagues entering at this round
Round 1	356	204	none	204	Belgian Provincial Leagues (204 teams)
Round 2	254	164	102	62	Belgian Division 3 (62 teams)
Round 3	172	132	82	50	Belgian Division 2 (50 teams)
Round 4	108	80	66	14	Belgian National Division 1 (14 teams)
Round 5	68	40	40	none	none
Round 6	48	32	20	12	Challenger Pro League (12 teams)
Round 7	32	32	16	16	Belgian Pro League (16 teams)
Round 8	16	16	16	none	none
Quarter-finals	8	8	8	none	none
Semi-finals	4	4	4	none	none
Final	2	2	2	none	none

== Round and draw dates ==
Round	Draw date	Match dates
First round	26 June 2023	29–31 July 2023
Second round	26 June 2023	4–6 August 2023
Third round	26 June 2023	11–13 August 2023
Fourth round	26 June 2023	18–20 August 2023
Fifth round	26 June 2023	25–27 August 2023
Sixth round	26 June 2023	8–10 September 2023
Seventh round		1–2 November 2023
Eighth round		5–7 December 2023
Quarter-finals		December 2023
Semi-finals		Leg 1: 23–25 January 2024; Leg 2: 23–25 February 2024
Final		9 May 2024

== First round ==
This round of matches was played on the weekend of 29 to 31 July 2023 and included 204 teams playing in the Belgian Provincial Leagues.

For this initial round, teams were split into ten groups according to geolocation.

Group	Number of teams	Teams from
Group 1	26	Antwerp
Group 2	24	Flemish Brabant (23) and East Flanders (1)
Group 3	20	Limburg
Group 4	26	East Flanders
Group 5	22	West Flanders
Group 6	16	Walloon Brabant
Group 7	14	Namur
Group 8	20	Hainaut
Group 9	16	Luxembourg (15) and Namur (1)
Group 10	20	Liège

Tie	Home team (tier)	Score	Away team (tier)
Group 1
1	Mortsel (7)	0–4	Tisselt (6)
2	Retie (6)	2–1	Loenhout (6)
3	Kontich (6)	3–0	Zammel (9)
4	Brasschaat (7)	2–3	'sGravenwezel-Schilde (6)
5	Duffel (7)	2–3	Ternesse Wommelgem (6)
6	Hoboken (6)	2–3	Ekeren Donk (9)
7	Wilrijk (7)	3–0	Zoersel (7)
8	Meer (8)	1–3	Antonia (6)
9	De Kempen (6)	4–1	Olmen (7)
10	St Dymphna Geel (7)	1–1 (5–4 p)	Zonhoven (6)
11	Wijnegem (8)	2–0	Herselt (7)
12	Olen United (9)	2–3	Zwijndrecht (7)
13	Schriek (8)	0–0 (2–3 p)	Kalfort Puursica (8)
Group 2
14	Binkom (8)	0–7	Rotselaar (6)
15	Wijgmaal (6)	2–3	Bierbeek (6)
16	Sterrebeek (8)	3–3 (6–7 p)	Tielt-Winge (8)
17	Alken (7)	3–2	Ritterklub Jette (8)
18	Linden (6)	0–1	Herent (6)
19	Kampenhout (6)	6–1	Hekelgem (7)
20	Rhode-De Hoek (7)	4–0	Vilvoorde (8)
21	Mazenzele Opwijk (6)	2–3	Galmaarden (8)
22	Landen (7)	3–1	Drieslinter (8)
23	Perk Steenokkerzeel (8)	0–0 (4–2 p)	Zuun (8)
24	Boutersem (8)	2–2 (4–5 p)	Veltem (7)
25	Fenixx (6)	2–2 (3–4 p)	Eppegem (6)
Group 3
26	Nieuwerkerken (8)	0–0 (3–1 p)	's Herenelderen (7)
27	Meeuwen (6)	0–1	Eendracht Maasmechelen (6)
28	Herkol (6)	0–3	Bree-Beek (6)
29	Achel (6)	2–0	Genker VV (8)
30	Overpelt (7)	3–0	Koersel (6)
31	Opoeteren (8)	0–6	Beringen (6)
32	Houthalen (9)	1–15	Torpedo Hasselt (6)
33	Zonhoven (8)	0–3	Vlijtingen (7)
34	Kattenbos (7)	0–0 (8–9 p)	Herk (6)
35	Smeermaas-Lanaken (8)	2–0	Biesen B (8)
Group 4
36	Berlare (6)	3–0	Sint-Niklaas (7)
37	Volkegem (7)	2–4	Borsbeke (6)
38	Eine (7)	3–1	Poesele (7)
39	Denderhoutem (6)	3–1	Bellem (8)
40	Svelta Melsele B (8)	8–0	Eendracht Zele (9)
41	Svelta Melsele (6)	1–1 (8–7 p)	S.K. Beveren (6)
42	Haasdonk (6)	1–0	Kleit Maldegem (6)
43	Gijzel-Oosterzele (8)	0–4	Destelbergen (6)
44	Vlaamse Ardennen (6)	1–0	Jong Zulte (8)
45	Heikant Zele (7)	1–2	Grembergen (7)
46	Zeveren (6)	1–7	Zottegem (6)
47	Doorslaar (6)	4–2	Munkzwalm (6)
48	Mariakerke (8)	0–8	Drongen (6)

Tie	Home team (tier)	Score	Away team (tier)
Group 5
49	WS Lauwe (6)	2–0	Houthulst (7)
50	Wevelgem (6)	3–2	Varsenare (6)
51	Diksmuide (6)	5–0 FF	Zwevezele (9)
52	Zonnebeke (7)	1–0	Moen (6)
53	Daring Brugge (7)	3–5	Ardooie (6)
54	Racing Waregem (6)	5–0 FF	Westrozebeke (6)
55	Dottingnies (6)	3–1	Ruddervoorde B (9)
56	Bredene (6)	1–2	Rumbeke (6)
57	Geluwe (8)	0–2	Oostnieuwkerke (6)
58	Meulebeke (6)	1–2	Heestert (6)
59	Boezinge (6)	4–2	Zedelgem (6)
Group 6
60	Willers-la-Ville (7)	2–3	Etterbeek (7)
61	BX Brussels (6)	2–0	Ixelles (6)
62	Genappe (6)	4–3	Saint-Michel (6)
63	Nseth Berchem (6)	5–0 FF	Alliance Evere (7)
64	Saint-Josse (6)	0–1	Walhain (7)
65	Léopold (6)	1–1 (3–2 p)	Auderghem (6)
66	Kosova Schaerbeek (6)	1–1 (4–2 p)	Sporting Bruxelles (6)
67	Jodoigne (8)	3–1	Grez-Doiceau (6)
Group 7
68	Evelette	1–0	Meux II
69	Grand-Leez	3–3 (3–1 p)	Loyers
70	Petigny	1–1 (5–6 p)	Flavion-Morialmé
71	US Dinantaise	2–0	Fernelmont-Hemptinne
72	Chevetonnge	0–1	Profondeville
73	Biesme	3–0	Nimses
74	Spy	2–2 (5–3 p)	Condruzien
Group 8
75	Isièroine	1–1 (5–4 p)	Luingnois
76	WSAC Fleurus	1–0	Thumaide
77	Péruwelz	4–0	Jumet
78	Hyon	0–4	Gilly
79	Houndinois	2–0	Havré
80	Antoing	2–1	Obigies
81	Anvaing	1–0	Molenbaix
82	Hornu	2–0	Naast
83	Montignies	3–0	Mons II
84	Estaimbourg	5–1	Morlanwelz
Group 9
85	Paliseulois	3–1	Freylangeoise
86	Ochamps	3–4	Messancy
87	Beauraing	2–0	Saint-Mard
88	Bleid	0–0 (7-6 p)	Bastogne
89	Libramont	3–1	Arlon
90	Oppagne-Weris	2–2 (2-4 p)	Houffaloise
91	Roy-Lignières	2–1	Assenois
92	Ethe Belmont	5–0	Vaux
Group 10
93	Heusy Rouheid	4–1	Seraing
94	Oreye Union	1–4	Saive
95	Ans Montegnee	1–1 (1–3 p)	Richelle II
96	La Calamine II	0–1	Francorchamps
97	Aubel	1–3	FC Du Geer
98	Malmundaria	5–4	Croatia Wandre
99	Honsfeld	2–3	Hannut
100	Fizoise	6–4	Amel
101	Butgenbach	0–1	Wanze/Bas-Oha II
102	Wasseiges	1–2	Beaufays

== Second round ==
Tie	Home team (tier)	Score	Away team (tier)
103	St Dymphna Geel (7)	0–0	Zwijndrecht (7)
104	Wilrijk (7)	3–2	Perk Steenokkerzeel (8)
105	De Kempen (6)	8–1	Tielt-Winge (8)
106	Ternesse Wommelgem (6)	0–1	Antonia (6)
107	Galmaarden (8)	0–2	Diest
108	Turnhout	5–0	Herselt (7)
109	Bierbeek (6)	2–1	Eksel
110	Pelt	3–2	Kontich (6)
111	Eendracht Termien	5–0	Ekeren Donk (9)
112	Kampenhout (6)	1–3	Wellen
113	Kalfort Puursica (8)	3–2	Berg en Dal
114	Rhode-De Hoek (7)	0–1	Geel
115	Alken (7)	0–2	'sGravenwezel-Schilde (6)
116	Nijlen	1–2	Landen (7)
117	Retie (6)	2–2	Schoonbeek-Beverst
118	Zwarte Leeuw	1–2	Herent (6)
119	Rotselaar (6)	0–3	St.-Lennaarts
120	Witgoor Sport Dessel	1–2	Tisselt (6)
121	Denderhoutem (6)	1–1	Vlijtingen (7)
122	Torpedo Hasselt (6)	2–2	Zepperen-Brustem
123	Svelta Melsele (6)	2–3	Destelbergen (6)
124	Overpelt (7)	2–4	Achel (6)
125	Eppegem (6)	2–1	Veltem (7)
126	Smeermaas-Lanaken (8)	0–0	Betekom
127	Bree-Beek (6)	7–1	Nieuwerkerken (8)
128	Eine (7)	0–5	Crossing Schaerbeek
129	Pepingen-Halle	2–0	Berlare (6)
130	Svelta Melsele B (8)	1–2	Jodoigne
131	Taminoise	0–1	Haasdonk (6)
132	Entite Manageooise	3–2	Borsbeke (6)
133	Beringen (6)	0–2	Perwez
134	Branois	1–0	Eendracht Maasmechelen (6)
135	Wambeek Ternat	2–1	Herk (6)
136	Wevelgem (6)	1–1	Léopold (6)
137	Elene-Grotenberge	3–0	BX Brussels (6)
138	Zonnebeke (7)	1–1	Jodoigne (8)
139	Wielsbeke	4–0	Ardooie (6)
140	Kosova Schaerbeek (6)	0–1	Zottegem (6)
141	Dottingnies (6)	0–1	WS Lauwe (6)
142	Racing Waregem (6)	1–1	Jong Lede
143	Hoger Op Wolvertem Merchtem	4–0	Doorslaar (6)
144	Vigor Wuitens Hamme	2–0	Rumbeke (6)
145	Westhoek	3–3	Etterbeek (7)
146	Oostnieuwkerke (6)	0–4	Genappe (6)
147	Eendracht Wervik	1–2	Diksmuide (6)
148	Boezinge (6)	0–1	Blankenberge
149	Eendracht Aalter	4–1	Drongen (6)
150	Roeselare-Daisel	3–0	Grembergen (7)
151	Hoger Op Kalken	3–1	Vlaamse Ardennen (6)
152	Avanti Stekene	1–1	Heestert (6)
153	Walhain (7)	1–1	Erpe-Mere Untied
154	St-Denijs Sport	4–0	Nseth Berchem (6)
155	Profondeville	0–4	Biesme
156	Gilly	0–1	Beloeil
157	Isièroine	0–4	Flenu
158	Aischoise	5–1	Evelette
159	Ostiches	2–0	US Dinantaise
160	Houndinois	2–2	Hornu
161	Péruwelz	3–1	Couvin
162	Onhaye	10–0	Anvaing
163	Arquet	1–3	Montignies
164	Spy	2–1	Estaimbourg
165	Antoing	3–1	Rapid Symphorinois
166	Flavion-Morialmé	6–1	WSAC Fleurus
167	Grand-Leez	1–3	Monceau
168	Wanze/Bas-Oha II	1–10	Richelle
169	Fizoise	2–1	Malmundaria
170	Richelle II	0–7	Wanze-Bas/Oha
171	Raeren-Eynatten	7–3	Heusy Rouheid
172	Francorchamps	1–0	Stade Waremmnien
173	Wallonne Ciney	2–1	Saive
174	Marlouie Sport	7–3	Bleid
175	Elsautoise	2–4	Beauraing
176	FC Du Geer	0–4	Sprimont
177	Gouvy	4–0	Roy-Lignières
178	Herstal	0–1	Beaufays
179	Ethe Belmont	2–1	Huy
180	Aywaille	1–1	Hannut
181	Houffaloise	2–2	Mormont
182	Libramont	1–3	Meix DT-Virton
183	Habay La Neuve	6–2	Messancy
184	Longlier	4–1	Paliseulois

== Third round ==
Tie	Home team (tier)	Score	Away team (tier)
185	Tempo Overijse	1–1(3-2)p	Herent (6)
186	Meux	2–0	Hoger Op Kalken
187	Ostiches	3–1	Londerzeel
188	Péruwelz	0–0(3-1)p	Onhaye
189	Ninove	2–0	Wallonne Ciney
190	La Calamine	p1–1	WS Lauwe (6)
191	Rochefortoise	5–0	Etterbeek (7)
192	Léopold (6)	1–3	Sprimont
193	Tournai	5–0	Longlier
194	Wanze-Bas/Oha	p0–0	Voorde-Appelterre
195	Zelzate	8–1	Vlijtingen (7)
196	Hamoir	2–1	Retie (6)
197	Aalst	1-0	Gouvy
198	Flenu	1–3	Roeselare-Daisel
199	Ethe Belmont	2–1	Antoing
200	Beaufays	2–1	Flavion-Morialmé
201	Diest	2–0	Meix DT-Virton
202	Rupel Boom	3–1	Fizoise
203	Erpe-Mere United	p2–2	Raeren-Eynatten
204	Monceau	3–2	Lille United
205	Tisselt (6)	2–2 (3–5 p)	Vigor Wuitens Hamme
206	Verlaine	p0–0	Landen (7)
207	Beloeil	0–6	Acren-Lessines
208	Jodoigne LS	0–1	Marlouie Sport
209	Perwez	p0–0	Torpedo Hasselt (6)
210	Berchem Sport	2–1	Antonia (6)
211	Sottegem (6)	2–3	Montignies
212	Wilrijk (7)	1–2	Brakel
213	Braine	p1–1	Wambeek Ternat
214	Bucholt	p1–1	Blankenberge
215	Binche	4–1	Smeermaas-Lanaken (8)
216	Wezel Sport	10-0	Jodoigne (8)
217	Destelbergen (6)	2–1	Beauraing
218	Habay La Neuve	p2–2	Geel
219	Genappe (6)	1–1p	Hoger Op Wolvertem Merchtem
220	Torhout	1–3	Pelt
221	Wellen	2–1	Pepingen-Halle
222	Racing Gent	3–0	Houndinois
223	Jette	2–0	'sGravenwezel-Schilde (6)
224	Crossing Schaerbeek	2–1	Hasselt
225	Francorchamps	2–2p	Lebbeke
226	Spy	2–4	Ganshoren
227	Rebecq	10–0	Kalfort Puursica (8)
228	Zwijndrecht (7)	1–2	Oudenaarde
229	Haasdonk (6)	p2–2	Tubize
230	Mandel United	1–1p	Elene-Grotenberge
231	Houtvenne	2–1	Avanti Stekene
232	Mons	11–0	Bierbeek (6)
233	Eppegem (6)	0–3	Tongeren
234	Merelbeke	2–0	Turnhout
235	Diksmuide (6)	2–3	Wetteren
236	Richelle	2–5	Oostkamp
237	Wielsbeke	1–5	Dikkelvenne
238	Sparta Petegem	1–0	Aywaille
239	Houffaloise	0–5	Racing Mechelen
240	Eendracht Aalter	0–1	Stockay-Warfusee
241	De Kempen (6)	1–5	Bilzen
242	Diegem	3–0	Bree-Beek (6)
243	Verviers	1–0	Biesme
244	Aische	1–1p	City Pirates Antwerp
245	Entite Manageooise	2–2p	La Louviere Centre
246	Lierse Berlaar	1–1p	Achel (6)
247	Sint-Denijs Sport	0–1	Harelbeke
248	Sint-Lennaarts	3–2	Gullegem
249	Hades	3–0	Racing Waregem (6)
250	Eendracht Termien	1–2	Warnan

== Fourth round ==
Tie	Home team (tier)	Score	Away team (tier)
251	Warnant	5–0	Tempo Overijse
252	Wellen	0–1	Monceau
253	Houtvenne	2–2p	Pelt
254	Ninove	3–1	Erpe-Mere United
255	Meux	3–0	Achel (6)
256	Braine	0–5	VW Hamme
257	Cappellen	1–1p	Verviers
258	Hades	1–2	Tongeren
259	City Pirates Antwerp	2–3	Sprimont
260	Crossing Schaerbeek	4–2	Heist
261	Olympic Charleroi	1–0	La Louviere Centre
262	Bocholt	3–3p	Excelsior Virton
263	Racing Mechelen	10–0	Montignies
264	Tienen	2–2p	Mons
265	Oudenaarde	4–0	Beaufays
266	Dikkelvenne	1–3	Harelbeke
267	Union Namur	0–5	Roeselare-Daisel
268	Bilzen	p1–1	Wolvertem Merchtem
269	Wezel	4–2	Olsa Brakel
270	Habay La Neuve	2–0	Destelbergen (6)
271	Elene-Grotenberge	5–4	Sparta Petegem
272	Acren-Lessines	1–3	Thes
273	URSL Vise	3–0	Tournai
274	Diegem	2–3	Aalst
275	Ganshoren	p2–2	Zelzate
276	Knokke	2–1	La Calamine
277	Binche	8–0	Haasdonk (6)
278	Hoogstraten VV	p1–1	Ostiches
279	Ethe Belmont	0–4	Berchem Sport
280	Rebecq	1–0	Lebbeke
281	Sint-Lennaarts	1–0	Racing Gent
282	Jette	2–3	Onhaye
283	Dessel Sport	4–2	Wetteren
284	Perwez	1–5	Merelbeke
285	Stockay-Warfusee	0–1	Hamoir
286	Wanze-Bas/Oha	0–8	La Louviere
287	Sint-Eloois-Winkel Sport	1–1p	Rochefort
288	Diest	0–1	Marlouie Sport
289	Lokeren-Temse	6–0	Verlaine
290	Oostkamp	1–2	Rupel Boom

== Fifth round ==
Tie	Home team (tier)	Score	Away team (tier)
291	Warnant	0–1	Lokeren-Temse
292	La Louviere	2–1	Sprimont
293	Elene-Grotenberge	4–3	Wezel
294	Harelbeke	2–1	VW Hamme
295	Verviers	2–3	Crossing Schaerbeek
296	Onhaye	3–0	Rebecq
297	Ninove	2–0	Roeselare-Daisel
298	Dessel Sport	1–2	Tongeren
299	Hoogstraten VV	3–2	Bilzen
300	Meux	4–1	Marlouie Sport
301	Thes	4–0	Hamoir
302	Knokke	3–0	Merelbeke
303	Rochefort	1–2	Racing Mechelen
304	Habay La Neuve	p0–0	Oudenaarde
305	Aalst	0–1	Mons
306	URSL Vise	2–1	Binche
307	Rupel Boom	2–3	Olympic Charleroi
308	Pelt	2–2p	Excelsior Virton
309	Sint-Lennaarts	1–0	Berchem Sport
310	Monceau	2–2p	Ganshoren

== Sixth round ==
8 September 2023	Oostende (2)	5–0	Ganshoren (4)	Ostend
20:00 CEST	Henderson 2'; Perez 39' (pen.); Berte 65', 81'; Atanga 90'	report		Stadium: Diaz Arena; Referee: Lauren Cools

9 September 2023	Zulte Waregem (2)	4–1	Sint-Lenaarts (5)	Waregem
18:00 CEST	Traoré 18'; Demuynck 59', 76'; Decostere 73'		Borahsasar 40'	Stadium: Elindus Arena; Referee: Cis Bellon

9 September 2023	Tongeren (4)	1–4	Francs Borains (2)	Tongeren
18:00 CEST	Stassen 20'	Report	Gillekens 29'; Chaabi 58'; Kadiri 79'; Chevalier 90+2'	Stadium: SportOase Eburons Dome; Referee: Jari Van Laere

9 September 2023	Habay-la-Neuve (5)	1–2	Meux (4)	Habay
18:00 CEST	Reyter 9'		Gaux 18'; Smal 77'	Stadium: Terrain de Habay-la-Neuve; Referee: Yann Jamar

9 September 2023	Virton (3)	0–1	Beveren (2)	Virton
19:00 CEST			Coopman 36'	Stadium: Stade Yvan Georges; Referee: Thibaut Patris

9 September 2023	Lokeren-Temse (3)	3–3 (a.e.t.) (3–5 p)	Beerschot (2)	Lokeren
20:00 CEST	Maes 51'; Lambo 75'; Braem 90+2'		Michez 18'; Cassaert 60' (o.g.); Nzouango 69'	Stadium: Daknamstadion; Referee: Marnic Claes
	Penalties
	Brachet (penalty scored); Cassaert (penalty missed); Reuten (penalty scored); Braem (penalty scored)		(penalty scored) Cagro; (penalty scored) Reyners; (penalty scored) Sanusi; (penalty scored) Meisl; (penalty scored) Kosiah

9 September 2023	Lierse Kempenzonen (2)	3–0	Ninove (4)	Lier
20:00 CEST	Van Acker 6'; Cools 28', 30'			Stadium: Heman Vanderpoortenstadion

9 September 2023	Olympic Charleroi (3)	1–1 (a.e.t.) (4–2 p)	Deinze (2)	Charleroi
20:00 CEST	Paulet 40' (pen.)		Quintero 16'	Stadium: Stade de la Neuville
	Penalties
	Hassaini (penalty scored); Cotter (penalty scored); Paulet (penalty missed); Karl (penalty scored); Ghesquiere (penalty scored)		(penalty missed) Prychynenko; (penalty missed) Braken; (penalty scored) Quintero; (penalty scored) Janssens

9 September 2023	Hoogstraten (3)	0–2	Patro Eisden Maasmechelen (2)	Hoogstraten
20:00 CEST			Sigurdarson 20', 90'	Stadium: Sportcomplex Seminarie

9 September 2023	RAAL La Louvière (3)	2–0	RFC Liège (2)	La Louvière
20:00 CEST	Pau 50'; Maës 82'			Stadium: Stade du Tivoli

9 September 2023	Thes Sport (3)	2–0	Racing Mechelen (4)	Tessenderlo
20:00 CEST	Vermijl 58'; Voca 81'			Stadium: Sportcentrum Tessenderlo

10 September 2023	Knokke (3)	3–1	Seraing (2)	Knokke-Heist
16:00 CEST	Prudhomme 53'; Naessens 59'; Kunda 82'		Douane 67'	Stadium: Stadion Olivier

10 September 2023	Mons (4)	0–1 (a.e.t.)	Dender (2)	Mons
16:00 CEST			Hens 117'	Stadium: Stade Charles Tondreau

10 September 2023	Visé (3)	2–0	Lommel (2)	Visé
16:00 CEST	Saidi 7', 83'			Stadium: Stade de la Cite de l'Oie

10 September 2023	Elene-Grotenberge (5)	4–3 (a.e.t.)	Crossing Schaerbeek (5)	Grotenberge
16:00 CEST	Hellinckx 38'; Okitakula 90'; De Haspe 93', 112'		Casagolda 45'; Mbenti 84', 101' (pen.)	Stadium: Terrain Grotenberge

10 September 2023	Onhaye (5)	1–1 (a.e.t.) (1–4 p)	Harelbeke (4)	Onhaye
16:00 CEST	Gilain 32' (pen.)		Lecour 2'	Stadium: Terrain de Onhaye
	Penalties
	Gilain (penalty missed); Fastrez (penalty scored); Gillis (penalty missed)		Vandenbroucke (penalty scored); Vanwildemeersch (penalty scored); Stiers (penalty scored); Coopman (penalty scored)

== Seventh round ==
The draw for the seventh round took place on 11 September 2023 and included the sixteen teams that progressed from the sixth round and the sixteen teams from the 2023–24 Belgian Pro League. The Pro League teams were seeded and could not meet each other. Furthermore, the eight non-professional teams left in the draw were always entitled to home-ground advantage, with the exception of Harelbeke, Meux and Elene-Grotenberge as their respective home grounds were not deemed suitable to host a cup match at this stage.

31 October 2023	Eupen (1)	0–2	Oostende (2)	Eupen
18:30 CET		Report	Pérez 3'; Berte 77'	Stadium: Kehrwegstadion

31 October 2023	Knokke (3)	1–1 (a.e.t.) (5–4 p)	Mechelen (1)	Knokke
20:00 CET	Vanraefelghem 114'	Report	Mrabti 107'	Stadium: Burgemeester Graaf Leopold Lippens Park
	Penalties
	Aelterman (penalty scored); Bailly (penalty scored); Jalloh (penalty scored); Vanraefelghem (penalty scored); Coninckx (penalty scored)		(penalty missed) Vanlerberghe; (penalty scored) Cobbaut; (penalty scored) Hairemans; (penalty scored) Bafdili; (penalty scored) Lauberbach

31 October 2023	Cercle Brugge (1)	2–2 (a.e.t.) (3–4 p)	Zulte Waregem (2)	Bruges
20:30 CET	Denkey 27'; Gboho 70'	Report	Traoré 22'; Vossen 90+3' (pen.)	Stadium: Jan Breydel Stadium
	Penalties
	Van der Bruggen (penalty scored); Gboho (penalty scored); Etonde (penalty missed); Lopes (penalty missed); Denkey (penalty scored)		(penalty scored) Vormer; (penalty scored) Vossen; (penalty scored) Willen; (penalty missed) Rommens; (penalty scored) Gano

31 October 2023	Thes Sport (3)	0–3	Charleroi (1)	Tessenderlo
20:30 CET		Report	Badji 38'; Rogelj 55'; Heymans 58'	Stadium: Gemeentelijk Sportpark Tessenderlo

31 October 2023	RAAL La Louvière (3)	0–1	Anderlecht (1)	La Louvière
20:30 CET		Report	Raman 19'	Stadium: Stade du Tivoli

31 October 2023	Sint-Truiden (1)	3–0 (a.e.t.)	Francs Borains (2)	Sint-Truiden
20:30 CET	Zahiroleslam 95'; Okazaki 111'; Steuckers 120+2' (pen.)	Report		Stadium: Stayen

1 November 2023	Union SG (1)	2–1	Meux (4)	Forest
15:00 CET	Leysen 36'; Rasmussen 84'	Report	Smal 83'	Stadium: Joseph Marien Stadium

1 November 2023	Lierse Kempenzonen (2)	1–4	Antwerp (1)	Lier
15:45 CET	Van Acker 28' (pen.)	Report	Alderweireld 15'; Ilenikhena 37'; De Laet 42'; Oularé 65' (o.g.)	Stadium: Herman Vanderpoortenstadion

1 November 2023	Visé (3)	0–4	Genk (1)	Visé
16:00 CET		Report	Sor 17'; Ouattara 51'; Zeqiri 82'; Baah 90+1'	Stadium: Stade de la Cité de l'Oie

1 November 2023	OH Leuven (1)	5–0	Elene-Grotenberge (5)	Leuven
18:00 CET	Shlomo 12'; Miguel 25'; Maertens 41'; Banzuzi 72'; N'Dri 77' (pen.)	Report		Stadium: Den Dreef

1 November 2023	Dender (2)	1–1 (a.e.t.) (3–4 p)	Kortrijk (1)	Denderleeuw
19:00 CET	Rajsel 10'	Report	Kadri 28' (pen.)	Stadium: Van Roystadion
	Penalties
	Pupe (penalty scored); Akman (penalty missed); Nsimba (penalty scored); M'Barki (penalty scored); Cools (penalty missed)		(penalty scored) Ojo; (penalty scored) Mehssatou; (penalty missed) Malinov; (penalty scored) Davies; (penalty scored) Kadri

1 November 2023	Patro Eisden Maasmechelen (2)	1–3	Gent (1)	Maasmechelen
19:00 CET	Hadj-Moussa 46'	Report	Tissoudali 29'; Hong 77'; Kums 81'	Stadium: Gemeentelijk Sportparkstadion Maasmechelen

1 November 2023	RWD Molenbeek (1)	1–0	Olympic Charleroi (3)	Molenbeek-Saint-Jean
20:00 CET	Dwomoh 83'	Report		Stadium: Edmond Machtens Stadium
Note: This match was originally scheduled to be played in Charleroi however, the mayor of Charleroi ruled that for safety reasons the game could not take place as planned so the game was moved to Molenbeek.

1 November 2023	Beveren (2)	3–1	Westerlo (1)	Beveren
20:00 CET	Coopman 5'; Hrnčár 45'; Koyalipou 81' (pen.)	Report	Madsen 90+1' (pen.)	Stadium: Freethiel Stadion

1 November 2023	Standard Liège (1)	5–0	Harelbeke (4)	Liège
20:30 CET	Perica 13', 58'; Balikwisha 55'; Ohio 80'; Emond 88'	Report		Stadium: Stade Maurice Dufrasne

1 November 2023	Beerschot (2)	0–6	Club Brugge (1)	Antwerp
20:45 CET		Report	Thiago 4'; Olsen 23', 44'; Odoi 30'; Vetlesen 33', 54'	Stadium: Olympisch Stadion

== Eighth round ==
The draw for the eighth round took place on 2 November 2023, one day after the completion of the previous round. No more seedings were used during the draw, but before the draw Knokke was certain of receiving home-ground advantage as the only non-professional team left in the draw. Most notable fixtures of the draw include a Clasico to be played between Anderlecht and Standard, the return of former captain Ruud Vormer to Club Brugge as they received his new team Zulte Waregem, and saw Knokke receive Oud-Heverlee Leuven. Title holders Antwerp were paired at home to Charleroi, who have yet to win the cup.

5 December 2023	Kortrijk (1)	0–1	RWD Molenbeek (1)	Kortrijk
20:00 CET			Reine-Adélaïde 84'	Stadium: Guldensporen Stadion

6 December 2023	Knokke (3)	1–1 (a.e.t.) (2–4 p)	OH Leuven (1)	Knokke
20:00 CET	Pieters 45+3'		Dom 24'	Stadium: Burgemeester Graaf Leopold Lippens Park
	Penalties
	Aelterman (penalty scored); Bailly (penalty scored); Jalloh (penalty missed); Addo (penalty missed)		Schrijvers (penalty scored); Þorsteinsson (penalty scored); Brunes (penalty scored); Holzhauser (penalty scored)

6 December 2023	Oostende (2)	3–1 (a.e.t.)	Genk (1)	Ostend
20:00 CET	Basila 65'; D'Haese 112'; Hartwig 120+1'		El Hadj 69'	Stadium: Diaz Arena

6 December 2023	Sint-Truiden (1)	0–1	Gent (1)	Sint-Truiden
20:30 CET			Cuypers 39'	Stadium: Stayen

6 December 2023	Antwerp (1)	5–2	Charleroi (1)	Antwerp
20:30 CET	Ejuke 45'; Boukamir 57' (o.g.); Janssen 71', 90+2'; Ilenikhena 76'		Dabbagh 28'; Heymans 31'	Stadium: Bosuilstadion

6 December 2023	Club Brugge (1)	4–0	Zulte Waregem (2)	Bruges
20:45 CET	Skov Olsen 16', 19'; Thiago 50', 58'			Stadium: Jan Breydel Stadium

7 December 2023	Beveren (2)	0–2	Union SG (1)	Beveren
20:00 CET			Bateau 90+3' (o.g.); Koyalipou 90+5' (o.g.)	Stadium: Freethiel Stadion

7 December 2023	Anderlecht (1)	2–0	Standard Liège (1)	Anderlecht
20:30 CET	Stroeykens 31'; Dreyer 51'			Stadium: Lotto Park

== Quarter-finals ==
The draw for the quarter-finals and semi-finals took place on 8 December 2023. With no amateur sides left, the draw was fully open as there were no seedings or predetermined home advantages. The draw resulted in a "Battle of Flanders" between Gent and Club Brugge and a Brussels derby between Union SG and Anderlecht. The matches at Union SG and OH Leuven were postponed due to snow.

16 January 2024	Gent (1)	0–1	Club Brugge (1)	Ghent
20:45 CET			Thiago 17'	Stadium: Ghelamco Arena

17 January 2024	Oostende (2)	2–0	RWD Molenbeek (1)	Ostend
20:00 CET	Henderson 26'; Laes 59'			Stadium: Diaz Arena

24 January 2024	OH Leuven (1)	2–3	Antwerp (1)	Leuven
20:30 CET	Maziz 2'; Maertens 79'		Janssen 8' (pen.), 18'; Van Den Bosch 54'	Stadium: Den Dreef

25 January 2024	Union SG (1)	2–1	Anderlecht (1)	Forest
20:30 CET	Lapoussin 26'; Rodríguez 62' (pen.)		Dreyer 90+4'	Stadium: Joseph Marien Stadium

== Semi-finals ==
The four quarter-final winners entered the semi-finals, held over two legs. The first legs were initially planned to be played one week after the quarter-finals, but as some of those matches were postponed the semi-finals were postponed as well.

=== First legs ===
7 February 2024	Club Brugge (1)	2–1	Union SG (1)	Sint-Andries
	Skov Olsen 10'; Jutglà 46'		Machida 90+3'	Stadium: Jan Breydel Stadium; Referee: Bram van Driessche

8 February 2024	Oostende (2)	1–1	Antwerp (1)	Ostend
	Henderson 37'		Doumbia 24'	Stadium: Diaz Arena; Referee: Nathan Verboomen

=== Second legs ===
28 February 2024	Union SG (1)	2–0 (3–2 agg.)	Club Brugge (1)	Forest
	Amoura 73'; Sykes 90+2'			Stadium: Joseph Marien Stadium

29 February 2024	Antwerp (1)	3–0 (4–1 agg.)	Oostende (2)	Antwerp
	Ilenikhena 16', 88'; Van Den Bosch 26'			Stadium: Bosuilstadion

== Final ==
9 May 2024
15:30 CEST

Union SG	1–0	Antwerp
Machida 45+1'	Report

King Baudouin Stadium, Brussels
Referee: Erik Lambrechts
