= 1967–68 in Belgian football =

Football in Belgium
- Season: 1967–68

The 1967–68 season was the 65th season of competitive football in Belgium. RSC Anderlechtois won their 14th and 5th consecutive Division I title. For the first time ever, a club would win 5 consecutive Belgian championships. RSC Anderlechtois entered the 1967–68 European Champion Clubs' Cup as Belgian title holder and Standard Liège the 1967–68 European Cup Winners' Cup as the Cup holder. RFC Brugeois (2nd), RFC Liégeois (3rd) and R Antwerp FC (5th) all played the 1967–68 Inter-Cities Fairs Cup. RFC Brugeois won the Belgian Cup final against R Beerschot AC (1-1 after extra time, 8–6 on penalties). The Belgium national football team ended their 1968 UEFA Euro qualification campaign at the 2nd place of Group 7 behind France and thus did not qualify for the second round. They also started their 1970 FIFA World Cup qualification campaign with a win against Finland.

== Overview ==
At the end of the season, R Antwerp FC and OC Charleroi were relegated to Division II and were replaced by ARA La Gantoise and RU Saint-Gilloise from Division II.
The bottom 2 clubs in Division II (KRC Mechelen and RC Tirlemont) were relegated to Division III, to be replaced by KFC Turnhout and RCS Brugeois from Division III.
The bottom club of each Division III league (KS Houthalen, R Stade Waremmien FC, RAA Louviéroise and SV Oudenaarde) were relegated to Promotion, to be replaced by KSC Menen, KSC Maccabi Voetbal Antwerp, RCS La Forestoise and FC Witgoor Sport Dessel from Promotion.

== National team ==
Date	Venue	Opponents	Score*	Comp	Belgium scorers
October 8, 1967	Heysel Stadium, Brussels (H)	Poland	2-4	ECQ	Johan Devrindt (2)
October 28, 1967	Stade Marcel Saupin, Nantes (A)	France	1-1	ECQ	Roger Claessen
November 22, 1967	Klokke Stadion, Bruges (H)	Luxembourg	3-0	ECQ	Johnny Thio (2), Roger Claessen
January 10, 1968	Bloomfield Stadium, Tel Aviv (A)	Israel	2-0	F	Johan Devrindt, Wilfried Puis
March 6, 1968	Heysel Stadium, Brussels (H)	Germany	1-3	F	Johan Devrindt
April 7, 1968	Olympic Stadium, Amsterdam (A)	The Netherlands	2-1	F	Odilon Polleunis, Johan Devrindt
April 24, 1968	Central Lenin Stadium, Moscow (A)	Soviet Union	0-1	F
June 19, 1968	Olympic Stadium, Helsinki (A)	Finland	2-1	WCQ	Johan Devrindt, Odilon Polleunis

* Belgium score given first

Key

- H = Home match
- A = Away match
- N = On neutral ground
- F = Friendly
- ECQ = European Championship qualification
- WCQ = World Cup qualification
- o.g. = own goal

== European competitions ==
RSC Anderlechtois beat Karl-Marx-Stadt of East Germany in the first round of the 1967–68 European Champion Clubs' Cup (won 3–1 away, 2–1 at home) but were eliminated in the second round by Sparta Prague of Czechoslovakia (lost 2–3 away, drew 3–3 at home).

Standard Liège defeated Altay SK of Turkey in the first round of the 1967–68 European Cup Winners' Cup (won 3–2 away, drew 0–0 at home).
In the second round, Standard eliminated Aberdeen FC of Scotland (won 3–0 at home, lost 0–2 away).
In the quarter-finals they lost to AC Milan of Italy (both legs were drawn 1-1, the second after extra time, but the Italians won a play-off game 2–0.

Three Belgian clubs entered the 1967–68 Inter-Cities Fairs Cup: in the first round, RFC Liégeois beat PAOK FC of Greece (won 2–0 away, 3–2 at home), but R Antwerp FC lost to Göztepe AŞ (lost 1–2 at home, drew 0–0 away) and RFC Brugeois lost to Sporting of Portugal (drew 0–0 at home, lost 1–2 away).
RFC Liégeois then lost in the second round to Dundee FC of Scotland (lost 1–3 away, 1–4 at home).

== Honours ==
Competition	Winner
Division I	RSC Anderlechtois
Cup	RFC Brugeois
Division II	ARA La Gantoise
Division III	KFC Turnhout and RCS Brugeois
Promotion	KSC Menen, KSC Maccabi Voetbal Antwerp, RCS La Forestoise and FC Witgoor Sport Dessel

== Final league tables ==
=== Premier Division ===
- 1967-68 Top scorer: Roger Claessen (Standard) and Paul Van Himst (RSC Anderlechtois) with 20 goals
- 1967 Golden Shoe: Fernand Boone (RFC Brugeois)
