= 2023–24 Belgian Division 3 =

Belgian Division 3
- Season: 2023–24

The 2023–24 Belgian Division 3 is the eighth season of the division in its current format, placed at the fifth-tier of football in Belgium.

== Team changes ==
=== In ===
- Relegated from the 2022–23 Belgian Division 2 were Westhoek, Erpe-Mere United, Pepingen-Halle, Beerschot U23, Turnhout, FC Seraing II and Waremme.
- Promoted from the Belgian Provincial Leagues were:
  - Champions for each of the provincial leagues: Berg en Dal (Antwerp), Perwez (Brabant ACFF), Wambeek Ternat (Brabant VV), Belœil (Hainaut), Elsautoise (Liège), Zepperen-Brustem (Limburg), Longlier (Luxembourg), Arquet (Namur)
  - In East Flanders, St-Denijs Sport took over the promotion spot of champions Borsbeke, who did not ask for licence and were hence ineligible for promotion.
  - In West Flanders, Blankenberge took over the promotion spot of champions Wevelgem City, who did not ask for licence and were hence ineligible for promotion.
  - Due to teams folding and/or voluntarily relegating at this and higher levels, extra spots opened up:
    - One extra team was promoted from Liège: Wanze/Bas-Oha.
  - Winner of the interprovincial round on VV side: Eksel.
  - Winners of the interprovincial round on ACFF side: Flénu and Gouvy.

=== Out ===
- Directly promoted into the Belgian Division 2 were 2022–23 Belgian Division 3 champions Overijse (VV A), Wezel (VV B), Mons (ACFF A) & Rochefort (ACFF B).
- Four teams also gained promotion following wins in the promotion play-offs Voorde-Appelterre, Houtvenne, Tournai and La Calamine.
- Relegated based on their finishing positions last season were
  - Rumbeke and Eppegem from division VV A,
  - Kampenhout, Wijgmaal and Beringen from division VV B,
  - Saint-Ghislain, Gosselies and Léopold from division ACFF A, and
  - Libramont, Durbuy and Givry from division ACFF B.
- On VV-side Drongen was also relegated after losing the relegation play-off.
- Due to financial difficulties, Anzegem was forced to drop out of the league. Their results were voided and the club will restart at the bottom of the Belgian Provincial Leagues.

=== Other changes ===
- Early 2023 it became known that Solières Sport and Huy would merge to become Union Hutoise. At that time Solières was playing in the 2022–23 Belgian Division 2, but as the club did not manage to avoid relegation, resulting in both feeder clubs playing in the Belgian Division 3, the new club started in the 2023–24 Belgian Division 3. As a result, an extra team was promoted from ACFF side to fill the gap.
- Furthermore, Roeselare-Daisel changed its name to SK Roeselare.

== Belgian Division 3 VV A ==
Locations of the 2023–24 Belgian Division 3 VV A teams

=== League table ===
Pos	Team	Pld	W	D	L	GF	GA	GD	Pts	Qualification or relegation
1	Westhoek (C, P)	30	17	7	6	61	30	+31	58	Promotion to the 2024–25 Belgian Division 2
2	Hamme	30	16	10	4	62	28	+34	58	Qualification for the Promotion play-offs VV
3	Wielsbeke	30	15	7	8	48	37	+11	52	Qualification for the Promotion play-offs VV
4	Roeselare (P)	30	13	11	6	44	25	+19	50	Qualification for the Promotion play-offs VV
5	Stekene	30	13	9	8	43	39	+4	48	Qualification for the Promotion play-offs VV
6	Kalken	30	11	13	6	52	39	+13	46	
7	Wervik	30	11	10	9	29	33	−4	43	
8	Blankenberge	30	10	13	7	50	40	+10	43	
9	St-Denijs Sport	30	11	6	13	45	46	−1	39	
10	Lede	30	10	7	13	50	55	−5	37	
11	Erpe-Mere	30	9	7	14	37	49	−12	34	
12	Elene Grotenberge	30	9	7	14	37	52	−15	34	
13	Aalter (R)	30	9	5	16	39	56	−17	32	Relegation to the 2024–25 Belgian Provincial Leagues
14	Wambeek Ternat (R)	30	8	7	15	40	53	−13	31	Relegation to the 2024–25 Belgian Provincial Leagues
15	Wolvertem Merchtem (R)	30	6	10	14	31	45	−14	28	Relegation to the 2024–25 Belgian Provincial Leagues
16	Pepingen-Halle (R)	30	3	9	18	25	66	−41	18	Relegation to the 2024–25 Belgian Provincial Leagues

Source: vbal4
Rules for classification: 1) Points; 2) Matches won; 3) Goal difference; 4) Goals scored; 5) Away matches won; 6) Goal difference in away matches; 7) Away goals scored.
(C) Champions; (P) Promoted; (R) Relegated

=== Period champions ===
- 1st Period: Wielsbeke (24 Points)
- 2nd Period: Westhoek (26 Points)
- 3rd Period: VW Hamme (21 Points)

== Belgian Division 3 VV B ==
Locations of the 2023–24 Belgian Division 3 VV B teams

=== League table ===
Pos	Team	Pld	W	D	L	GF	GA	GD	Pts	Qualification or relegation
1	Termien (C, P)	30	23	3	4	89	31	+58	72	Promotion to the 2024–25 Belgian Division 2
2	Berg en Dal (O, P)	30	18	7	5	78	44	+34	61	Qualification for the Promotion play-offs VV
3	Zepperen-Brustem	30	16	5	9	53	38	+15	53	Qualification for the Promotion play-offs VV
4	Pelt (P)	30	15	8	7	54	34	+20	53	Qualification for the Promotion play-offs VV
5	Wellen (P)	30	12	11	7	50	36	+14	47	Qualification for the Promotion play-offs VV
6	Geel	30	12	11	7	43	36	+7	47	
7	Nijlen	30	12	7	11	57	54	+3	43	
8	Sint-Lenaarts	30	12	6	12	50	49	+1	42	
9	Turnhout	30	11	8	11	49	46	+3	41	
10	Beerschot U23	30	10	11	9	54	47	+7	41	
11	Schoonbeek-Beverst	30	12	4	14	37	43	−6	40	
12	Zwarte Leeuw	30	9	9	12	39	41	−2	36	
13	Betekom (R)	30	8	10	12	55	61	−6	34	Relegation to the 2024–25 Belgian Provincial Leagues
14	Diest (R)	30	7	6	17	38	60	−22	27	Relegation to the 2024–25 Belgian Provincial Leagues
15	Witgoor (R)	30	6	5	19	38	60	−22	23	Relegation to the 2024–25 Belgian Provincial Leagues
16	Eksel (R)	30	0	3	27	19	123	−104	3	Relegation to the 2024–25 Belgian Provincial Leagues

Source: vbal4
Rules for classification: 1) Points; 2) Matches won; 3) Goal difference; 4) Goals scored; 5) Away matches won; 6) Goal difference in away matches; 7) Away goals scored.
(C) Champions; (O) Play-off winners; (P) Promoted; (R) Relegated

=== Period champions ===
- 1st Period: Berg en Dal (24 Points)
- 2nd Period: Termien (26 Points)
- 3rd Period: Termien (25 Points)

== Belgian Division 3 ACFF A ==
Locations of the 2023–24 Belgian Division 3 ACFF A teams

=== League table ===
Pos	Team	Pld	W	D	L	GF	GA	GD	Pts	Qualification or relegation
1	Onhaye (C, P)	30	22	6	2	70	17	+53	72	Promotion to the 2024–25 Belgian Division 2
2	Crossing Schaerbeek (P)	30	18	7	5	65	32	+33	61	Qualification for the Promotion play-offs ACFF
3	Manageoise (P)	30	18	6	6	65	28	+37	60	Qualification for the Promotion play-offs ACFF
4	Ostiches-Ath (P)	30	17	9	4	59	24	+35	60	Qualification for the Promotion play-offs ACFF
5	Ciney	30	15	5	10	69	61	+8	50	
6	Aische	30	12	7	11	54	36	+18	43	
7	Perwez (Note: Awarded a forfeit victory on the final day of the season following Couvin-Mariembourg's withdrawal)	30	13	3	14	43	46	−3	42	
8	CS Braine	30	12	5	13	36	30	+6	41	Qualification for the Promotion play-offs ACFF
9	Monceau	30	11	7	12	43	42	+1	40	
10	Arquet	30	10	7	13	53	51	+2	37	
11	Jodoigne	30	10	7	13	37	42	−5	37	
12	Flénu	30	11	3	16	46	47	−1	36	
13	Belœil	30	10	5	15	44	53	−9	35	
14	Tamines (R)	30	10	3	17	45	56	−11	33	Relegation to the 2024–25 Belgian Provincial Leagues
15	Symphorinois (R)	30	8	6	16	41	52	−11	30	Relegation to the 2024–25 Belgian Provincial Leagues
16	Couvin-Mariembourg (R)	30	0	0	30	17	170	−153	0	Relegation to the 2024–25 Belgian Provincial Leagues

Source: RBFA
Rules for classification: 1) Points; 2) Matches won; 3) Goal difference; 4) Goals scored; 5) Away matches won; 6) Goal difference in away matches; 7) Away goals scored.
(C) Champions; (P) Promoted; (R) Relegated

=== Period champions ===
- 1st Period: Onhaye (26 Points)
- 2nd Period: Manageoise (23 Points)
- 3rd Period: Braine (24 Points)

== Belgian Division 3 ACFF B ==
Locations of the 2023–24 Belgian Division 3 ACFF B teams

=== League table ===
Pos	Team	Pld	W	D	L	GF	GA	GD	Pts	Qualification or relegation
1	Union Hutoise (C, P)	30	23	2	5	75	36	+39	71	Promotion to the 2024–25 Belgian Division 2
2	Raeren-Eynatten (P)	30	21	3	6	76	26	+50	66	Qualification for the Promotion play-offs ACFF
3	Habay-la-Neuve (P)	30	18	7	5	58	28	+30	61	Qualification for the Promotion play-offs ACFF
4	Aywaille (P)	30	18	7	5	58	28	+30	61	Qualification for the Promotion play-offs ACFF
5	Seraing II (Note: Seraing II was automatically promoted to increase the number of U23 teams in the Belgian Division 2.) (P)	30	15	5	10	67	49	+18	50	
6	Elsautoise	30	14	4	12	58	47	+11	46	Qualification for the Promotion play-offs ACFF
7	Sprimont	30	13	7	10	56	37	+19	46	
8	Richelle	30	14	3	13	56	50	+6	45	
9	Mormont	30	11	6	13	43	46	−3	39	
10	Waremme	30	10	7	13	36	47	−11	37	
11	Meix-dt-Virton	30	10	6	14	35	55	−20	36	
12	Marloie	30	10	4	16	51	60	−9	34	
13	Gouvy	30	9	7	14	36	57	−21	34	
14	Wanze/Bas-Oha (R)	30	8	7	15	41	57	−16	31	Relegation to the 2024–25 Belgian Provincial Leagues
15	Longlier (R)	30	2	7	21	33	70	−37	13	Relegation to the 2024–25 Belgian Provincial Leagues
16	Herstal (R)	30	1	4	25	18	104	−86	7	Relegation to the 2024–25 Belgian Provincial Leagues

Source: Soccerway
Rules for classification: 1) Points; 2) Matches won; 3) Goal difference; 4) Goals scored; 5) Away matches won; 6) Goal difference in away matches; 7) Away goals scored.
(C) Champions; (P) Promoted; (R) Relegated

=== Period champions ===
- 1st Period: Union Hutoise (27 Points)
- 2nd Period: Raeren-Eynatten (27 Points)
- 3rd Period: Habay-la-Neuve (24 Points)

== Promotion play-offs ==
=== Promotion play-offs VV ===
The play-offs feature eight teams, the two second-place finishers in divisions VV A and VV B as well as from each division the winners of each of the three periods (for periods won by overall champions or runners-up the highest team not yet qualified takes the spot instead). The eight teams play a knockout tournament, with the top two teams being promoted, all teams were unseeded when setting up the draw.

Qualified teams:

- Berg en Dal (runner-up division VV B)
- Hamme (runner-up division VV A)
- Pelt (2nd highest place finisher (4th) not directly qualified from division VV A)
- Roeselare (2nd highest place finisher (4th) not directly qualified from division VV B)
- Stekene (3rd highest place finisher (5th) not directly qualified from division VV B)
- Wellen (3rd highest place finisher (5th) not directly qualified from division VV A)
- Wielsbeke (highest place finisher (3rd) not directly qualified from division VV B)
- Zepperen-Brustem (highest place finisher (3rd) not directly qualified from division VV A)

Round 1
5 May 2024
Wellen	2(5)
Hamme	2(3)
4 May 2024
Pelt	2
Zepperen-Brustem	1
4 May 2024
Berg en Dal	4
Stekene	1
5 May 2024
Roeselare	3
Wielsbeke	2

Round 2
9 May 2024
Wellen	2
Pelt	5
9 May 2024
Berg en Dal	1
Roeselare	0

Placing 1st/2nd
12 May 2024
Pelt	1
Berg en Dal	3
Placing 3rd/4th
12 May 2024
Wellen	1
Roeselare	4

==== Round 1 ====
5 May 2024
15:00 CEST

Wellen	2–2 (a.e.t.)	Hamme
Vanderhoeft 57'; Houben 59'		Smet 27', 90+3'
Penalties
Schevenels (penalty scored); Haex (penalty scored); Poell (penalty scored); Dieme (penalty scored); Meeus (penalty scored)	5–3	(penalty scored) Claeys; (penalty missed) De Witte; (penalty scored) Goossens; (penalty scored) Smet

4 May 2024
20:00 CEST

Pelt	2–1	Zepperen-Brustem
Paumen 6'; Mols 12'		Verjans 84'

4 May 2024
17:00 CEST

Berg en Dal	4–1	Stekene
Van Pol 3', 90'; Remen 34'; Molenberghs 71'		Van Gysel 60'

5 May 2024
15:00 CEST

Roeselare	3–2	Wielsbeke
Hallaert 18'; Van De Velde 55', 85'		Dejaegere 14' (pen.); Maddens 90'

==== Round 2 ====
9 May 2024
15:00 CEST

Berg en Dal	1–0	Roeselare
Van Pol 57'

9 May 2024
15:00 CEST

Wellen	2–5	Pelt
Dieme 23' (pen.); Ramaekers 59'		Paesen 44'; Gerritsen 69', 73', 88'; Paumen 82'

==== 3rd/4th place ====
12 May 2024
15:00 CEST

Roeselare	4–1	Wellen
Hallaert 11', 74'; Daels 68', 90'		Winkels 7'

==== Final ====
12 May 2024
15:00 CEST

Berg en Dal	3–1	Pelt
Goossens 56' (o.g.); Creemers 85'; Appeltans 90'		Gerritsen 22'

=== Promotion play-offs ACFF ===
The play-offs feature eight teams, the two second-place finishers in divisions ACFF A and ACFF B as well as from each division the winners of each of the three periods (for periods won by overall champions or runners-up the highest team not yet qualified takes the spot instead).

Qualified teams:

- Aywaille (highest place finisher (4th) not directly qualified from division ACFF B)
- Braine (winner period 3 division ACFF A)
- Crossing Schaerbeek (runner-up division ACFF A)
- Elsautoise (2nd highest eligible place finisher (6th) not directly qualified from division ACFF B)
- Habay-la-Neuve (winner period 3 division ACFF B)
- Manageoise (winner period 2 division ACFF A)
- Ostiches-Ath (highest place finisher (4th) not directly qualified from division ACFF A)
- Raeren-Eynatten (runner-up division ACFF B)

Round 1
5 May 2024
Raeren-Eynatten	1
Braine	0
5 May 2024
Habay-la-Neuve	3
Aywaille	0
5 May 2024
Crossing Schaerbeek	3
Elsautoise	2
5 May 2024
Manageoise	3(6)
Ostiches-Ath	3(5)

Round 2
9 May 2024
Raeren-Eynatten	2
Habay-la-Neuve	1
9 May 2024
Crossing Schaerbeek	2
Manageoise	1

Placing 1st/2nd
12 May 2024
Raeren-Eynatten	0
Crossing Schaerbeek	1
Placing 3rd/4th
12 May 2024
Habay-la-Neuve	0
Manageoise	1

==== Quarter-finals ====
5 May 2024
15:00 CEST

Raeren-Eynatten	1–0 (a.e.t.)	Braine
Damarios 118'

5 May 2024
15:00 CEST

Habay-la-Neuve	3–0	Aywaille
Serwy 21', 33'; Molinari 90'

5 May 2024
15:00 CEST

Crossing Schaerbeek	3–2	Elsautoise
Absisan 5'; Mbenti 89'; Casagolda 90'		De Marrée 50' (o.g.); Mazouze 65'

5 May 2024
15:00 CEST

Manageoise	3–3 (a.e.t.)	Ostiches-Ath
Scohy 28'; Wildemeersch 60' (pen.); Hoebeke 94'		Bofenda 33' (pen.); Itoua 54'; Cortvrint 109' (pen.)
Penalties
Ozturk (penalty scored); Thibaut (penalty missed); Valcke (penalty scored); Paquot (penalty scored); Scohy (penalty scored); Vanhecke (penalty scored); Depril (penalty scored)	6–5	(penalty scored) Vandeville; (penalty missed) Vallera; (penalty scored) Nzuzi Nzolani; (penalty scored) Cortvrint; (penalty scored) Biévez; (penalty missed) Herbecq; (penalty scored) Hospied
