= List of football stadiums in Belgium =

The following is a list of football stadiums in Belgium, ranked in order of capacity, with the minimum capacity being 5,000.

== Current stadiums ==
#	Image	Stadium	Capacity	City	Home team	UEFA rank
1		King Baudouin Stadium	50,093	Brussels	Belgium national football team	4/4 stars
2		Jan Breydel Stadium	29,062	Bruges	Club Brugge, Cercle Brugge	4/4 stars
3		Stade Maurice Dufrasne	27,670	Liège	Standard Liège	3/4 stars
4		Cegeka Arena	23,718	Genk	Racing Genk	3/4 stars
5		Lotto Park	22,500	Anderlecht	Anderlecht	3/4 stars
6		Bosuilstadion	21,000	Antwerp	Royal Antwerp F.C.	3/4 stars
7		Planet Group Arena	20,175	Ghent	KAA Gent	4/4 stars
8		Achter de Kazerne	16,672	Mechelen	KV Mechelen	
9		Stade du Pays de Charleroi	15,000	Charleroi	R. Charleroi S.C.	
10		Stayen	14,600	Sint-Truiden	STVV	
11		Herman Vanderpoortenstadion	14,538	Lier	Lierse	
12		Olympisch Stadion	12,500	Antwerp	Beerschot	
13		Stade du Tivoli	12,500	La Louviere	URS Centre	
14		Elindus Arena	12,414	Waregem	S.V. Zulte Waregem	
15		Edmond Machtens Stadium	12,266	Molenbeek	RWD Molenbeek	
16		Daknamstadion	12,136	Lokeren	Sporting Lokeren	
17		Stade de Buraufosse	11,000	Liège	RFC Tilleur	
18		Stade Le Canonnier	10,800	Mouscron	Stade Mouscronnois	
19		Den Dreef	10,020	Heverlee	OH Leuven	
20		Forestiersstadion	10,000	Harelbeke	KRC Harelbeke	
21		Stade Joseph Marien	9,400	Forest	Union Saint-Gilloise	
22		Guldensporenstadion	9,399	Kortrijk	KV Kortrijk	
23		Stedelijk Sportstadion	8,800	Hasselt	Sporting Hasselt	
24		Diaz Arena	8,432	Ostend	K.V. Oostende	
25		Kehrweg Stadion	8,363	Eupen	KAS Eupen	
26		Schiervelde Stadion	8,340	Roeselare	Roeselare	
27		Stade du Pairay	8,207	Seraing	RFC Seraing	
28		Freethiel Stadion	8,190	Beveren	Waasland-Beveren	
29		Stade Leburton	8,100	Tubize	AFC Tubize	
30		Easi Arena	8,050	La Louvière	RAAL La Louvière	
31		Het Kuipje	8,035	Westerlo	KVC Westerlo	
32		Stadion De Leunen	8,000	Geel	ASV Geel	
33		Soevereinstadion	8,000	Lommel	Lommel S.K.	
34		Stade de la Neuville	8,000	Charleroi	Olympic Charleroi	
35		Stade Luc Varenne	7,552	Tournai	RFC Tournai	
36		Van de Wielestadion	7,500	SK Deinze	Deinze	
37		Stedelijk sportstadion Jules Matthijs	7,000	Zottegem	-	
38		Gemeentelijk Parkstadion	6,940	Boom	Rupel Boom	
39		Van Roystadion	6,429	Denderleeuw	FVC Dender EH	
40		Oscar Vankesbeeck Stadion	6,123	Mechelen	Racing Mechelen	
41		Stade Charles Tondreau	6,000	Mons	Royal Albert Quévy-Mons	
42		Stade Robert Urbain	6,000	Boussu	Francs Borains	
43		Gemeentelijke Stadion Vigor Wuitens Hamme	6,000	Hamme	Vigor Wuitens Hamme	
44		Louis Van Roeystadion	6,000	Rijkevorsel	Zwarte Leeuw	
45		Patrostadion	5,500	Maasmechelen	K. Patro Eisden Maasmechelen	
46		Stade de la Cité de l'Oie	5,460	Wezet	FC United Richelle	
47		Orphale Cruckestadion	5,021	Ronse	KSK Ronse	
48		Gemeentestadion	5,000	Schaerbeek	Crossing Schaerbeek, RC de Schaerbeek	

== Former stadiums ==
Stadiums which have been demolished and no longer exist.

#	Stadium	Capacity	City	Home team	Notes
1	Stade Vélodrome de Rocourt	40,000	Liège	RFC Liège	demolished in 1995
2	Albert Dyserynckstadion	25,000	Bruges	Club Brugge KV	demolished in 1999
3	De Noordlaan	18,000	Winterslag	KFC Winterslag	demolished in 2004
4	Jules Ottenstadion	12,919	Ghent	K.A.A. Gent	demolished in 2013
5	Stadion De Schalk	10,000	Willebroek	KVC Willebroek-Meerhof	demolished in 2018
6	Stade Drève de maire	7,500	Tournai	R.R.C. Tournaisien	demolished in 2002
7	Stade Justin Peeters	5,000	Wavre	Wavre Sports FC	converted to a hockey field in 2021

== See also ==
- Football in Belgium
- List of football clubs in Belgium
- List of European stadiums by capacity
- List of association football stadiums by capacity
- Lists of stadiums
