= KSC Maccabi Antwerp =

Belgian football club

- Full name: Koninklijke Sporting Club; Maccabi-Voetbal Antwerp
- Founded: 1920
- Ground: Maccabilaan, Hoboken, Antwerp
- Chairman: Chaim Serror
- Manager: Didier Abeles
- League: Antwerpen – 4de Provinciale
Home colours	Away colours

KSC Maccabi Antwerp is a sportclub based in Antwerp, Belgium.

History of KSC Maccabi Antwerp.

1920 – Creation of Sport Club Maccabi

1930 – European Maccabi Games in Antwerp ( 1st time )

1956 – His Majesty the King authorises S.C. Maccabi to bear the title of "Koninklijke Sport Club Maccabi"

1962 – Inauguration of the Sport facilities in Hoboken

1964 – Inauguration of the Tennis Complex

1982 – Inauguration of the Tennis Hall

1983 – European Maccabi Games in Antwerp ( 2nd time )

1983 – Inauguration of the Squash Courts

1995 – Inauguration Maccabilaan for the 75th anniversary

2003 – European Maccabi Games in Antwerp ( 3rd time )

Chairmen :

1920 – 1st chairman: W. Swalf

1922 – 2nd chairman: G. Maringer

1925 – 3rd chairman: J. Proujansky

1944 – 4th chairman: J. Deutsch

1946 – 5th chairman: H. E. Bochner

1970 – 6th chairman: P. Goldfinger

1976 – 7th chairman: M. Grunberger

1982 – 8th chairman: A. Lilienthal

1984 – 9th chairman: R. Blits

1988 – 10th chairman: M. Sluszny

2000 – 11th chairman: S. Goldberg

== See also ==
- Football in Belgium
- List of football clubs in Belgium
