= Tomáš Heřman =

Czech footballer (born 1969)

Personal information
- Date of birth: 23 November 1969 (age 56)
- Place of birth: Czechoslovakia
- Position: Striker

Senior career*
Years	Team	Apps	(Gls)
1990–1991	Chomutov		(14)
1991–1992	Slavia Prague	1	(0)
1993–1998	Viktoria Plzeň	126	(24)
1998–1999	Teplice	16	(1)
1999–2001	Turnhout	52	(28)
2001–2003	RAEC Mons	39	(16)
2003–2005	Kortijk	38	(13)
- * Club domestic league appearances and goals

Tomáš Heřman (born 23 November 1969) is a Czech former footballer.

== Early life ==
He is the son of a Czech footballer. He is a native of the north Bohemian region, Czech Republic.

== Career ==
He started his career with FC Chomutov. In 1991, he signed for SK Slavia Prague. In 1993, he signed for FC Viktoria Plzeň. In 1998, he signed for FK Teplice. In 1999, he signed for Belgian side KFC Turnhout. In 2001, he signed for Belgian side RAEC Mons. In 2003, he signed for KV Kortijk. He retired from professional football in January 2005 and left for the German amateur club Heidenauer SV.

== Personal life ==
He can speak English. He has been married.
