= Waasland derby =

Football rivalry in Belgium

Waasland Derby
- Location: (Belgium) Waasland
- Teams: KSK Beveren; Sporting Lokeren; SK Beveren; KSC Lokeren-Temse
- Stadiums: Freethiel Stadion; Daknamstadion

Statistics
- Total meetings: 66 - 15 - 2
- Most wins: KSK Beveren (29)
- Largest victory: Sporting Lokeren 0-7 K.S.K. Beveren

The Waasland derby, also known as the Wase derby, were football matches between KSK Beveren and Sporting Lokeren, two clubs located in the Waasland. When KSK Beveren temporarily stopped their men's team in 2010 and Waasland Beveren started playing in the Freethiel Stadium, this club took over the role. In 2020, Sporting Lokeren went bankrupt, which put a definitive end to the original derby. After a name change in 2020 from the club KSV Temse to KSC Lokeren-Temse, the move to the Daknam Stadium and the name change of Waasland Beveren in 2023 to SK Beveren, the supporters of both clubs demanded the derby when they played each other for the first time in their history in 2024 in the Challenger Pro League. However, the credibility of this 'derby' is questioned by the supporters of KSK Beveren, as they have had a men's team in competition again since 2023 and also with the fact that Sporting Lokeren was declared bankrupt in 2020. The only thing that both clubs can claim is that they play in the stadiums of the two former greats, namely the Freethiel stadium and the Daknam stadium.

== History ==
In the late 1970s, the focus of Belgian football shifted to the Waasland, where the local clubs of Lokeren and Beveren played a prominent role. Both clubs enjoyed a period of prosperity in which they challenged the established Belgian top clubs.

In Beveren, this success led to two national titles (1979 and 1984), four finals in the Belgian Cup of which two were victories (1978 and 1983), two Belgian Super Cup (1979 and 1984) and a remarkable semi-final in the 1978–79 European Cup Winners' Cup against FC Barcelona. Lokeren, about 25 kilometres away, also enjoyed success, but to a lesser extent because it failed to win a title during that period. The club finished second in the league in the 1980-1981 season and reached the quarter-finals of the UEFA Cup against AZ Alkmaar. In addition, Lokeren consistently finished fourth in the Belgian league in the seasons from 1979 to 1982.

The rivalry between Lokeren and Beveren arose during this successful period, with legendary duels on the field, including confrontations between Beveren goalkeeper Jean-Marie Pfaff and Lokeren striker Preben Elkjær Larsen. In the 1990s, the tension moved outside the stadium, which meant that matches between the two clubs were regularly considered risky by the police. In the early 1990s, the fight moved outside the stadium, so this match was invariably regarded as a risk match by law enforcement.

On February 17, 2007, the last derby between KSK Beveren and Sporting Lokeren was played, the match ended in a 3-2 final score in favor of Beveren. Both teams played 66 official matches over the years, of which Beveren won 29, Lokeren won 23 and 13 ended in a draw.

Afterwards, Koninklijke Voetbalclub Red Star Waasland - Sportkring Beveren (registration number 4068) abbreviated Waasland-Beveren took over the role. In 2020, Sporting Lokeren went bankrupt and this derby also came to an end. During this period, Waasland Beveren only managed to win 2 of the 15 matches that the clubs played against each other, Lokeren won 6.

Since 2024, the derby has been called the Wasico by some fans, a pun on Waasland and the Spanish El Classico, something that was adopted by the media.

== Results ==
=== KSK Beveren - Sporting Lokeren (1974-2007) ===
Season	Competition	Home team	Away team	Score
74/75	First division	KSK Beveren	Sporting Lokeren	3-1
74/75	First division	Sporting Lokeren	KSK Beveren	0-1
75/76	First division	Sporting Lokeren	KSK Beveren	1-0
75/76	First division	KSK Beveren	Sporting Lokeren	2-1
76/77	First division	KSK Beveren	Sporting Lokeren	1-1
76/77	First division	Sporting Lokeren	KSK Beveren	1-0
77/78	First division	Sporting Lokeren	KSK Beveren	0-2
77/78	First division	KSK Beveren	Sporting Lokeren	1-1
77/78	Belgian Cup	Sporting Lokeren	KSK Beveren	0-2
78/79	First division	KSK Beveren	Sporting Lokeren	3-0
78/79	First division	Sporting Lokeren	KSK Beveren	1-1
79/80	First division	Sporting Lokeren	KSK Beveren	2-0
79/80	Belgian Cup	Sporting Lokeren	KSK Beveren	0-1
79/80	First division	KSK Beveren	Sporting Lokeren	1-0
80/81	First division	Sporting Lokeren	KSK Beveren	2-0
80/81	First division	KSK Beveren	Sporting Lokeren	1-1
80/81	Belgian cup	KSK Beveren	Sporting Lokeren	2-2
80/81	Belgian cup	Sporting Lokeren	KSK Beveren	3-0
81/82	First division	KSK Beveren	Sporting Lokeren	1-1
81/82	Belgian cup	KSK Beveren	Sporting Lokeren	1-0
81/82	Belgian cup	Sporting Lokeren	KSK Beveren	1-0
81/82	First division	Sporting Lokeren	KSK Beveren	2-1
82/83	First division	Sporting Lokeren	KSK Beveren	2-1
82/83	First division	KSK Beveren	Sporting Lokeren	2-1
82/83	Belgian Cup	Sporting Lokeren	KSK Beveren	1-3
82/83	Belgian Cup	KSK Beveren	Sporting Lokeren	2-1
83/84	First division	KSK Beveren	Sporting Lokeren	1-0
83/84	First division	Sporting Lokeren	KSK Beveren	0-2
84/85	First division	KSK Beveren	Sporting Lokeren	2-0
84/85	First division	Sporting Lokeren	KSK Beveren	0-1
85/86	First division	Sporting Lokeren	KSK Beveren	0-1
85/86	First division	KSK Beveren	Sporting Lokeren	2-2
86/87	First division	KSK Beveren	Sporting Lokeren	1-1
86/87	First division	Sporting Lokeren	KSK Beveren	2-0
87/88	First division	Sporting Lokeren	KSK Beveren	0-0
87/88	First division	KSK Beveren	Sporting Lokeren	0-1
88/89	First division	KSK Beveren	Sporting Lokeren	0-3
88/89	First division	Sporting Lokeren	KSK Beveren	3-0
89/90	First division	KSK Beveren	Sporting Lokeren	0-2
89/90	First division	Sporting Lokeren	KSK Beveren	0-3
91/92	First division	KSK Beveren	Sporting Lokeren	2-3
91/92	First division	Sporting Lokeren	KSK Beveren	0-1
92/93	First division	Sporting Lokeren	KSK Beveren	2-2
92/93	First division	KSK Beveren	Sporting Lokeren	2-2
94/95	Belgian cup	Sporting Lokeren	KSK Beveren	0-7
97/98	First division	Sporting Lokeren	KSK Beveren	1-2
97/98	First division	KSK Beveren	Sporting Lokeren	3-0
98/99	First division	KSK Beveren	Sporting Lokeren	1-2
98/99	First division	Sporting Lokeren	KSK Beveren	4-3
99/00	First division	KSK Beveren	Sporting Lokeren	2-1
99/00	First division	Sporting Lokeren	KSK Beveren	5-2
00/01	First division	KSK Beveren	Sporting Lokeren	1-1
00/01	First division	Sporting Lokeren	KSK Beveren	0-2
01/02	First division	Sporting Lokeren	KSK Beveren	1-0
01/02	First division	KSK Beveren	Sporting Lokeren	0-2
02/03	First division	KSK Beveren	Sporting Lokeren	0-1
02/03	First division	Sporting Lokeren	KSK Beveren	1-2
03/04	First division	Sporting Lokeren	KSK Beveren	1-2
03/04	First division	KSK Beveren	Sporting Lokeren	1-1
04/05	First division	Sporting Lokeren	KSK Beveren	1-1
04/05	First division	KSK Beveren	Sporting Lokeren	0-2
05/06	First division	Sporting Lokeren	KSK Beveren	1-2
05/06	Belgian Cup	KSK Beveren	Sporting Lokeren	5-1
05/06	First division	KSK Beveren	Sporting Lokeren	1-3
06/07	First division	Sporting Lokeren	KSK Beveren	2-0
06/07	First division	KSK Beveren	Sporting Lokeren	3-2

=== Waasland Beveren - Sporting Lokeren (2012-2020) ===
Season	Competition	Home team	Away team	Score
12/13	First division	Sporting Lokeren	Waasland-Beveren	2-0
12/13	First division	Waasland-Beveren	Sporting Lokeren	0-0
13/14	First division	Waasland-Beveren	Sporting Lokeren	0-2
13/14	Belgian Cup	Waasland-Beveren	Sporting Lokeren	1-3
13/14	First division	Sporting Lokeren	Waasland-Beveren	0-0
14/15	First division	Sporting Lokeren	Waasland-Beveren	3-0
14/15	First division	Waasland-Beveren	Sporting Lokeren	0-0
15/16	First division	Sporting Lokeren	Waasland-Beveren	1-2
15/16	First division	Waasland-Beveren	Sporting Lokeren	2-3
16/17	First division	Waasland-Beveren	Sporting Lokeren	1-1
16/17	First division	Sporting Lokeren	Waasland-Beveren	0-0
17/18	First division	Waasland-Beveren	Sporting Lokeren	2-3
17/18	First division	Sporting Lokeren	Waasland-Beveren	1-1
18/19	First division	Sporting Lokeren	Waasland-Beveren	1-0
18/19	First division	Waasland-Beveren	Sporting Lokeren	2-1

=== SK Beveren - KSC Lokeren-Temse (2024-present) ===
Season	Competition	Home team	Away team	Score
24/25	First division	Waasland-Beveren	KSC Lokeren-Temse	0-1
24/25	First division	KSC Lokeren-Temse	SK Beveren	0-1
