= Luc De Rijck =

Belgian footballer

Personal information
- Date of birth: 18 August 1965
- Place of birth: Lier, Belgium
- Date of death: 4 April 1991 (aged 25)
- Place of death: Vosselaar, Belgium
- Height: 1.88 m (6 ft 2 in)
- Position: Striker

Senior career*
Years	Team	Apps	(Gls)
1983–1985	Lierse		
1985–1986	KFC Rita Berlaar		
1986–1991	KFC Turnhout		
- * Club domestic league appearances and goals

Luc De Rijck (18 August 1965 – 4 April 1991) was a Belgian professional football player. He died at the age of 25 after suffering a heart attack.

De Rijck was a leading top-scorer for his club and in the second division at the time of his death. His heart attack was initiated by an air bubble injected when he was connected to an oxygen machine at the club's physician offices.

== See also ==
- K.V. Turnhout
