= Football rivalries in Belgium =

List of association football rivalries

This is a list of the main association football rivalries in Belgium.

== National rivalries ==
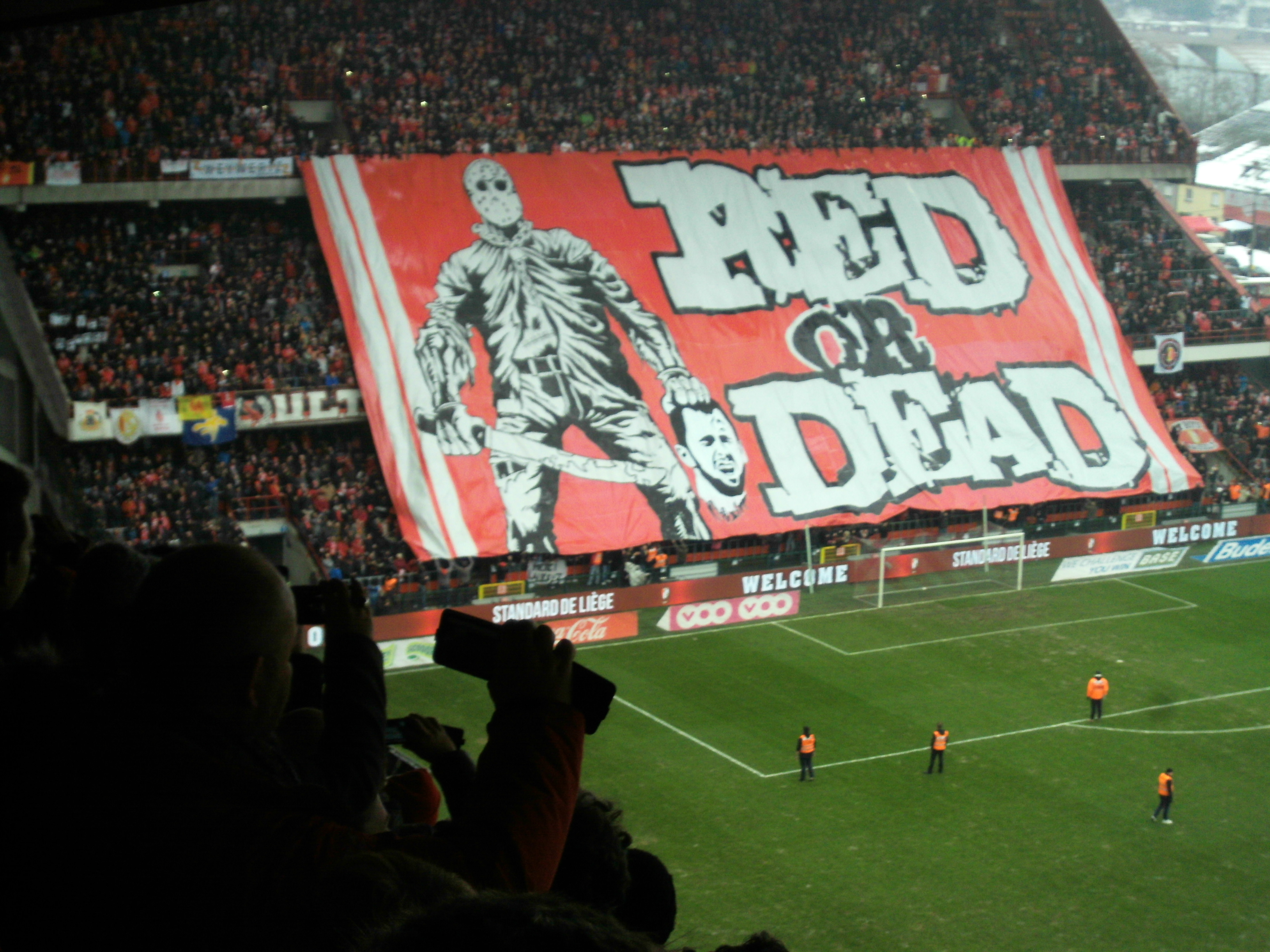
Tifo of Standard supporters addressed to their ex-player Steven Defour, then player of Anderlecht (January 2015).

- The 'Classico': Anderlecht vs. Standard Liège
- The Topper: R.S.C. Anderlecht–Club Brugge KV rivalry: Anderlecht vs. Club Brugge.
- The Battle of Flanders: Club Brugge vs. Gent. Named after the Battle of Flanders, a name given to the historic rivalry between the cities in the Middle Ages, mainly within the economic sphere.
- The Choc Wallon: Standard Liège vs. Sporting Charleroi Note that despite being called a derby, these cities are over 80km apart and Charleroi is for instance much closer to Brussels than to Liège. With Charleroi and Liège being two of the most important cities in Wallonia however, this rivalry has received a specific name as The Walloon derby.

== City derbies ==
- Antwerp derby, match to determine the Ploeg van 't Stad: mainly between Antwerp and Beerschot. Berchem Sport also has a rich history and featured a lot in the Antwerp derby, but is currently playing in the lower divisions.
- Bruges derby: Club Brugge vs. Cercle Brugge .
- Brussels derby: RWDM Brussels vs. Anderlecht vs. Union SG. The derby between RWDM and Union SG is colloquially called the Zwanze derby.
- Charleroi derby: Olympic Charleroi vs. Sporting Charleroi.
- Ghent derby: KAA Gent vs. Racing Gent.
- Genk derby: KRC Genk vs. Eendracht Termien.
- Liège derby: RFC Liège vs. Standard Liège
- Lier derby: Lierse vs. Lyra
- Mechelen derby: KV Mechelen vs. Racing Mechelen

== Regional derbies ==
- Liège Province derby: Standard de Liège vs. Seraing
- Limburg derby: Genk vs. Sint-Truiden
- East Flanders Derbies:
  - Gent vs. Sporting Lokeren
  - Waasland Derby: SK Beveren vs. Sporting Lokeren.
- South West Flanders derby: Zulte-Waregem vs. Kortrijk. Used to include Roeselare as well, but they are currently playing in the lower leagues.
- Antwerp Province derby: Lierse vs. KV Mechelen
- Denderstreek derby: Dender vs. Eendracht Aalst
- Dijle derby: KV Mechelen vs. OH Leuven
- Hainaut Derby: Sporting Charleroi vs. RAAL La Louvière
