= Teo Quintero =

Venezuelan footballer (born 1999)

Personal information
- Full name: Teo Quintero León
- Date of birth: 2 March 1999 (age 27)
- Place of birth: Barcelona, Spain
- Height: 1.88 m (6 ft 2 in)
- Position: Defensive midfielder

Team information
- Current team: Sparta Rotterdam
- Number: 4

Youth career
- 2008–2015: CB Cinc Copes
- 2015–2017: Damm
- 2017–2018: Girona

Senior career*
Years	Team	Apps	(Gls)
2018–2019	Peralada	21	(0)
2019–2021	Hércules	20	(0)
2021–2022	Sabadell	13	(1)
2022–2024	Deinze	46	(9)
2024–	Sparta Rotterdam	49	(1)

International career^{‡}
2025–	Venezuela	8	(0)
Medal record
Men's football
Representing Venezuela
FIFA Series
Runner-up	2026 Uzbekistan
- * Club domestic league appearances and goals as of 25 October 2026 ‡ National team caps and goals as of 22:03, 2 October 2026 (UTC)

Teo Quintero León (born 2 March 1999) is a professional footballer who plays as a defensive midfielder for Eredivisie club Sparta Rotterdam. Born in Spain, he plays for the Venezuela national team.

== Club career ==
Quintero is a youth product of CB Cinc Copes, Damm and Girona. He began his senior career with Peralada, a subsidiary of Girona but was hampered by injuries.

On 1 July 2024, Quintero signed a three-year contract with Sparta Rotterdam in the Netherlands.

== International career ==
Quintero was born in Spain to Venezuelan parents and is a dual citizen. He was called up to the Venezuela national team for the friendly matches against Iceland and United Arab Emirates on 22 and 27 September 2022, respectively.

== Career statistics ==
=== Club ===
As of match played 28 October 2026

Appearances and goals by club, season and competition
Club	Season	League			Cup		Europe		Other		Total	
Club	Season	Division	Apps	Goals	Apps	Goals	Apps	Goals	Apps	Goals	Apps	Goals
Peralada	2018–19	Segunda División B	21	0	0	0	—		—		21	0
Hércules	2019–20	Segunda División B	10	0	1	0	—		—		11	0
Hércules	2020–21	Segunda División B	10	0	0	0	—		—		10	0
Hércules	Total		20	0	1	0	—		—		21	0
Sabadell	2021–22	Primera Federación	13	1	1	0	—		—		14	1
Deinze	2022–23	Challenger Pro League	22	3	2	1	—		—		24	4
Deinze	2023–24	Challenger Pro League	33	6	1	1	—		—		34	7
Deinze	Total		55	9	3	2	—		—		58	11
Sparta Rotterdam	2024–25	Eredivisie	12	1	0	0	—		0	0	12	1
Sparta Rotterdam	2025–26	Eredivisie	30	0	2	0	—		—		32	0
Sparta Rotterdam	2026–27	Eredivisie	7	0	1	0	—		—		8	0
Sparta Rotterdam	Total		49	1	3	0	—		0	0	52	1
Career total			158	11	8	2	0	0	0	0	166	13

=== International ===
As of match played 2 October 2026

Appearances and goals by national team and year
National team	Year	Apps	Goals
Venezuela	2025	3	0
Venezuela	2026	5	0
Total		8	0

== Honours ==
Venezuela

- FIFA Series runner-up: 2026
