= Lucas Prudhomme =

Footballer (born 1999)

Personal information
- Full name: Lucas Fernand Christophe Prudhomme
- Date of birth: 31 May 1999 (age 27)
- Place of birth: Arlon, Belgium
- Height: 1.80 m (5 ft 11 in)
- Positions: Midfielder; winger; striker

Team information
- Current team: Al Dhaid
- Number: 10

Senior career*
Years	Team	Apps	(Gls)
2017–2020	Virton	38	(7)
2020–2021	Gimnàstic	1	(0)
2021	→ Differdange 03 (loan)	12	(1)
2021–2023	RFC Liège	56	(2)
2023–2025	Knokke	53	(21)
2025–	Al Dhaid	0	(0)

International career
2017	Luxembourg U19	3	(1)
2017–2020	Luxembourg U21	17	(0)
- * Club domestic league appearances and goals as of 6 June 2026

Lucas Fernand Christophe Prudhomme (born 31 May 1999) is a footballer who plays as a midfielder, winger or striker for Al Dhaid. Born in Belgium, he is a Luxembourgish youth international.

== Early life ==
As a youth player, Prudhomme joined the youth academy of Belgian side Virton and was after being promoted to the senior team regarded as one of the youngest players on the squad.

== Club career ==
Prudhomme started his career with Belgian side Virton but left after the club was denied a license for the Belgian second tier. In 2021, he signed for Belgian side RFC Liège. He was described as a "great offensive asset" for the club.

== International career ==
In 2017, Prudhomme was first called up to the Luxembourg national under-21 football team.

== Style of play ==
Prudhomme can operate as a midfielder, winger, or striker, and is known for his "ability with the ball".

== Personal life ==
Prudhomme studied tourism in Libremont.
