= Maico Gerritsen =

Dutch footballer (born 1986)

Personal information
- Date of birth: 21 March 1986 (age 40)
- Place of birth: Venlo, Netherlands
- Height: 1.81 m (5 ft 11 in)
- Positions: Attacking midfielder; striker

Team information
- Current team: Wezel Sport

Youth career
- VVV

Senior career*
| Years | Team | Apps | (Gls) |
| 2005–2008 | VVV | 19 | (0) |
| 2008 | → Verbroedering Geel (loan) | 14 | (1) |
| 2008 | Bocholt | 7 | (0) |
| 2009 | Esperanza Neerpelt | | |
| 2009–2010 | KSK Hasselt | 22 | (1) |
| 2010–2012 | Excelsior Veldwezelt | 38 | (12) |
| 2012–2014 | Oosterzonen | 47 | (15) |
| 2014–2015 | Houtvenne | 29 | (21) |
| 2015–2016 | Esperanza Pelt | 26 | (3) |
| 2016–2023 | Lille United | 28 | (8) |
| 2023–2025 | Esperanza Pelt | 49 | (29) |
| 2025–2026 | Sint-Lenaarts | 30 | (15) |
| 2026– | Wezel Sport | | |
- * Club domestic league appearances and goals as of 5 August 2026

Maico Gerritsen (born 21 March 1986) is a Dutch footballer who plays as a striker for Wezel Sport.

== Career ==
A product of VVV's youth system, Gerritsen spent three seasons playing for VVV's senior side, making a total of 19 Eerste Divisie appearances. During the 2007–08 season, he didn't feature for VVV, and was sent on loan to Belgian Second Division side Verbroedering Geel, then in last place in the division.

VVV released Gerritsen after the six-month loan at Geel. He joined Belgian Third Division side Bocholter VV for one season where he rarely featured, and signed with Belgian Fourth Division side Esperanza Neerpelt in January 2009. He later played for Hasselt, Lille United and Sint Leenaarts. He joined Wezel Sport in summer 2026.
