= Simon Paulet =

Belgian footballer (born 2000)

Personal information
- Date of birth: 15 February 2000 (age 26)
- Place of birth: Mons, Belgium
- Height: 1.79 m (5 ft 10 in)
- Position: Midfielder

Team information
- Current team: RFC Liège
- Number: 18

Youth career
- –2018: Club Brugge
- 2018–2020: Swansea City

Senior career*
Years	Team	Apps	(Gls)
2020–2024	Westerlo	11	(1)
2022–2023	→ Virton (loan)	20	(0)
2023–2024	→ Olympic Charleroi (loan)	30	(7)
2024–2025	Olympic Charleroi	29	(8)
2025–	RFC Liège	17	(3)

International career^{‡}
2015	Belgium U15	4	(0)
2015–2016	Belgium U16	7	(2)
2016–2017	Belgium U17	5	(0)
2017	Belgium U18	5	(0)
2019	Belgium U19	3	(0)
- * Club domestic league appearances and goals as of 19 April 2026 ‡ National team caps and goals as of 26 March 2019

Simon Paulet (born 15 February 2000) is a Belgian professional footballer who plays as a midfielder for Challenger Pro League club RFC Liège.

== Club career ==
In 2018, Paulet joined the youth academy of English second division side Swansea City, where he suffered a hamstring injury.

In 2020, Paulet signed for Westerlo in the Belgian First Division B, debuting against Deinze.

On 22 July 2022, Paulet joined Challenger Pro League club Virton on a one-season loan.

On 2 July 2025, Paulet moved to RFC Liège on a two-year deal.

== Honours ==
Westerlo

- Belgian First Division B: 2021–22
