= KFC Turnhout =

Belgian football club

Turnhout
- Full name: Kempische Football Club Turnhout
- Founded: 1912
- Ground: Stadsparkstadion
- Capacity: 3,000
- League: Belgian Division 3
- 2025–26: Belgian Division 3 VV B, 11th of 16
- Website: www.kfct.be
Home colours	Away colours

KFC Turnhout is a Belgian football club, from the municipality of Turnhout. The team competes in the Belgian Division 3, the fifth level of the Belgian football league system.

== History ==
KFC Turnhout was founded as Turnhout Sport in 1912 with matricule n°148. After World War I, the club was refounded as F.C. Turnhout with the same matriculation. Turnhout managed to advance through the lower leagues, to play twice in the first division: in 1931 and 1936.

The second division was their main stay afterwards, until the club was relegated to the third division in 1952. That same year the club was awarded the Royal title Koninklijke, and was called K.F.C. Turnhout onwards. In 1963, again promotion to the first division was achieved, as second division club Thor Waterschei that came in second that year was faced with a bribery scandal. However, the next year, Turnhout itself came under suspicion, and the club was relegated from the top flight even though it finished third last in the standings that year.

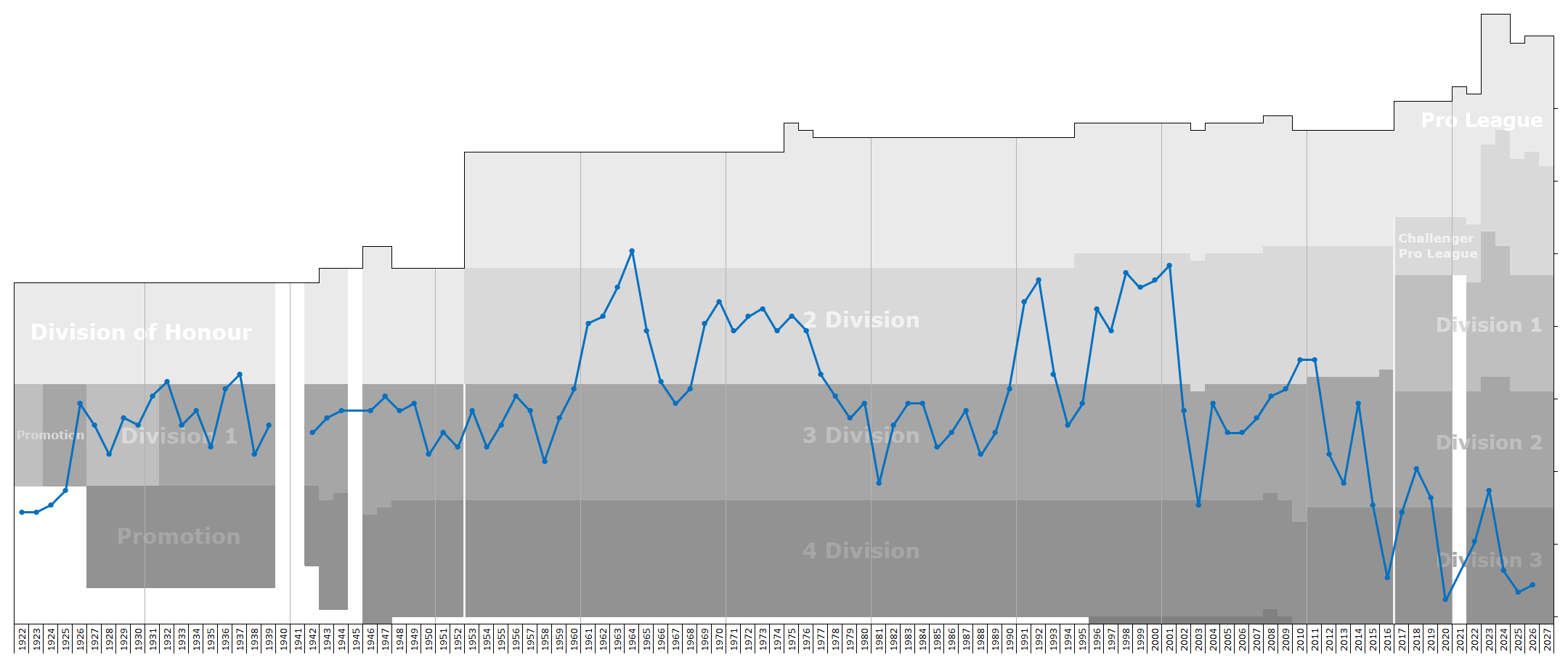
Historical chart of KFC Turnhout league performance

The next seasons, Turnhout played in the second division, until it was relegated in 1977 to the third division, where they would stay until 1990. In 1991, the 25-year top scorer of the club and second division, Luc De Rijck, suffered a heart attack while visiting the club's physician. It became apparent later that the doctor had applied blood doping to the player, but because of a wrongful connection in the machinery, an air embolism developed in the player's body. The doctor later faced a criminal conviction.

During the 1990s, the club came close on several occasions to win promotion again to the first division, but failed each time in the play-offs. After financial problems, the club degraded to the fourth division, and the club's old ground, the Villapark, had to be sold. New management took over the club, and the club was renamed to KV Turnhout. In 2007, the club was sold to the Wadi Degla company of Egypt, which also owns Lierse SK During the 2009–10 season, both Turnhout and Lierse played in the second division, therefore Wadi Degla suspended sponsorship of Turnhout for a year.

== Former players ==
- (Belgium) Swat Engelen (1921-41)
- (Czech Republic) Tomáš Heřman

== Notable coaches ==
- (Turkey) Fuat Çapa (2001–04)
- (Belgium) René Desaeyere (2006–09)
- (Belgium) Luc Beyens (2009–10)
- (Belgium) Eric Van Meir (2011)
- (Germany) Daniel Simmes (2011–13)
- (Belgium) Jo Christiaens (2020–22)
