= Thomas Paumen =

Belgian footballer

Personal information
- Date of birth: 7 January 1999 (age 27)
- Place of birth: Genk, Belgium
- Height: 1.81 m (5 ft 11 in)
- Position: Midfielder

Team information
- Current team: Turkse Rangers
- Number: 23

Youth career
- Genk
- Roda JC

Senior career*
Years	Team	Apps	(Gls)
2018–2019	Roda JC	1	(0)
2019–2020	Patro Eisden		
2020–2021	Bilzerse Waltwilder		
2021–2022	RC Hades	23	(4)
2022–2023	Houtvenne	28	(8)
2023–2024	KFC Esperanza Pelt	12	(2)
2024–	Turkse Rangers		
- * Club domestic league appearances and goals as of 20:19, 15 January 2026 (UTC)

Thomas Paumen (born 7 January 1999) is a Belgian footballer who plays as a midfielder for Turkse Rangers.

== Club career ==
He made his Eerste Divisie debut for Roda JC Kerkrade on 14 October 2018 in a game against Go Ahead Eagles as a half-time substitute for Gyliano van Velzen.
