= Hakim Borahsasar =

Belgian footballer

Personal information
- Date of birth: 14 January 1995 (age 31)
- Place of birth: Antwerp, Belgium
- Height: 1.81 m (5 ft 11 in)
- Position: Forward

Team information
- Current team: KVC Wilrijk
- Number: 9

Youth career
- –2012: Lokeren
- 2012–2015: Club Brugge

Senior career*
Years	Team	Apps	(Gls)
2015–2016	NAC Breda	11	(0)
2016–2017	Oudenaarde	10	(2)
2017–2018	KSC City Pirates		
2018–2020	Tempo Overijse	28	(9)
2020–2021	ASV Geel		
2021–2022	KVV Ternesse		
2022–2025	KFC Sint-Lenaarts	64	(25)
2025–	KVC Wilrijk	0	(0)
- * Club domestic league appearances and goals as of 15 January 2026

Hakim Borahsasar (born 14 January 1995) is a Belgian professional footballer who plays as a forward for KVC Wilrijk.

== Career ==
He signed for NAC Breda in January 2015, from Club Brugge.
