= Daknamstadion =

Football stadium in Daknam, Belgium

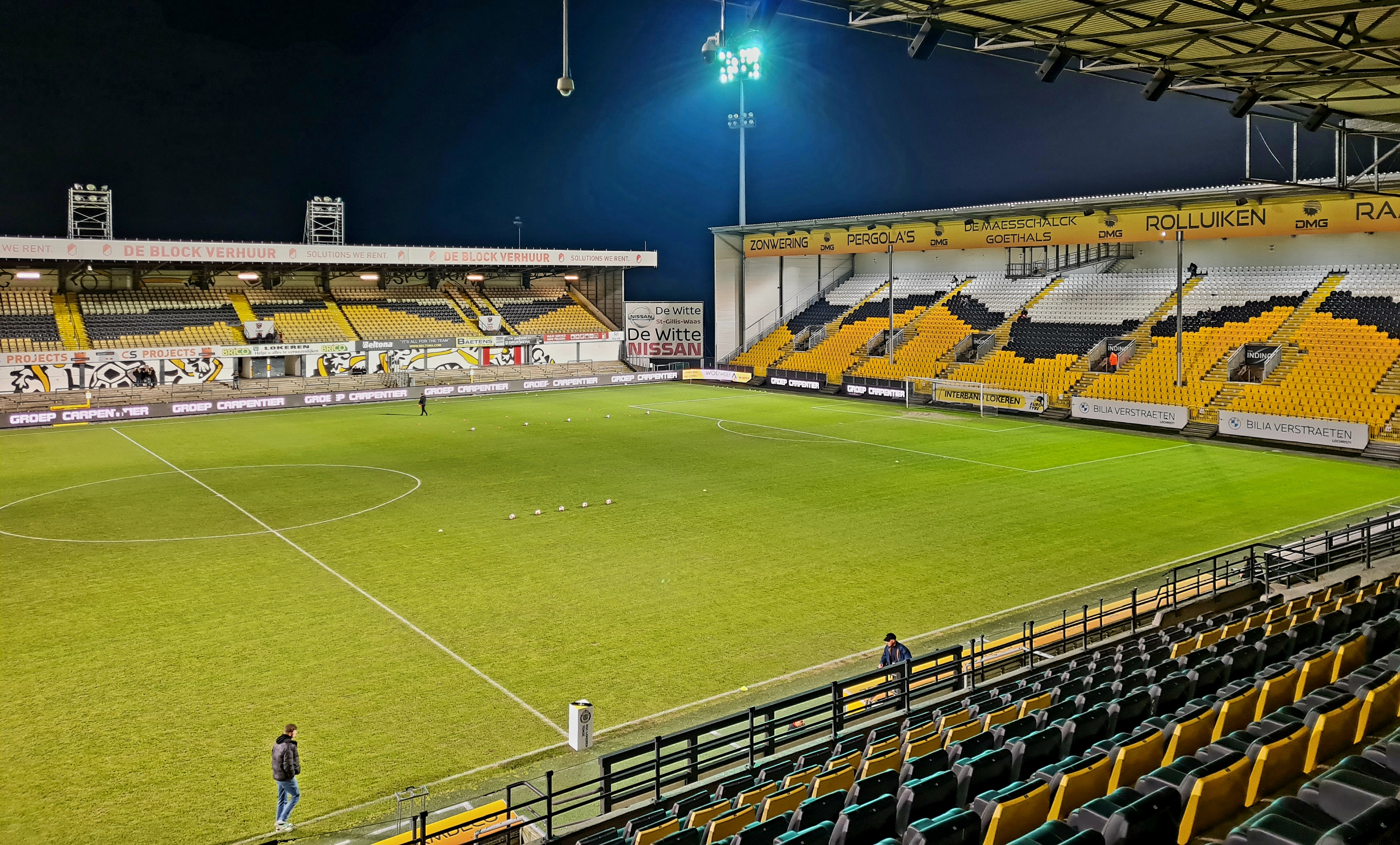
- Interactive map of Daknamstadion
- Former names: Het Stedelijk Stadion
- Location: Daknamstraat 91; 9160 Lokeren; Belgium
- Coordinates: 51°6′59″N 3°59′14″E
- Owner: Municipality of Lokeren
- Capacity: 12,136
- Surface: 93% Grass, 7% artificial turf
- Scoreboard: LED-scoreboards

Construction
- Built: 1956
- Renovated: 1974, 1997, 2000–2003, 2014
- Expanded: 1974

Tenants
- KSC Lokeren (1970–2000); KSC Lokeren Sint-Niklaas Waasland (2000–2003); Sporting Lokeren (2003–2020); Lokeren-Temse (2020–present); Club NXT (2020)

Daknamstadion is a football stadium in the village Daknam, municipality Lokeren (Belgium). The stadium is the home ground of Lokeren-Temse and was the stadium of Sporting Lokeren before the club went bankrupt in 2020. Around 1980 the stadium could host 18,000 people, due to security reasons the stadium's capacity was reduced to 9,560. In 2014, the club renovated its stadium to fulfill UEFA requirements for European football.

On 3 March 2010, it hosted an under 21 international between Belgium and Malta.

== See also ==
- List of football stadiums in Belgium
- Lists of stadiums
