= Football in Belgium =

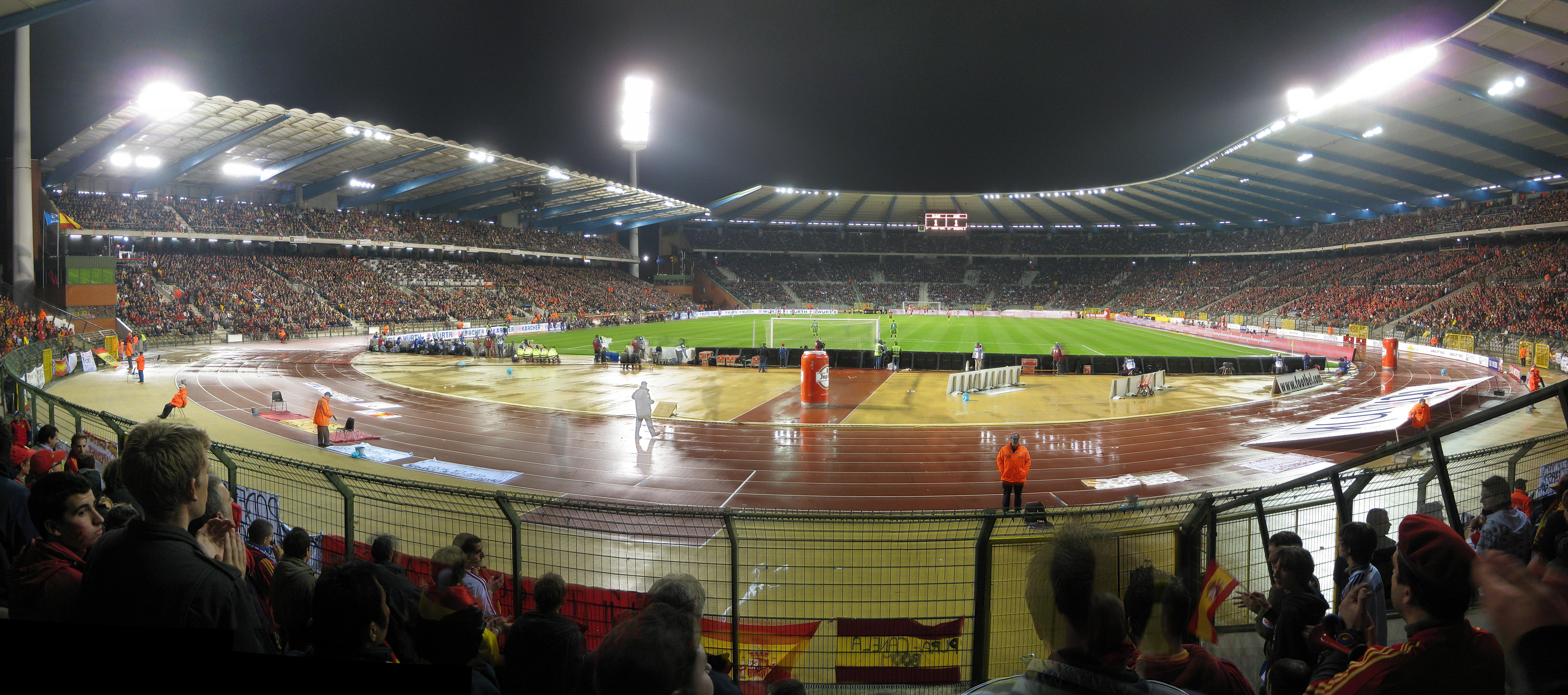
- The King Baudouin Stadium in Brussels during a football match.
- Country: Belgium
- Governing body: Belgian Football Association
- National team: men's national team

National competitions
- FIFA World Cup; UEFA European Championship; UEFA Nations League

Club competitions
- League: Belgian Pro League; Belgian Women's Super League; Challenger Pro League; Cups: Belgian Cup; Belgian Women's Cup; Belgian Super Cup

International competitions
- FIFA Club World Cup; FIFA Intercontinental Cup; UEFA Champions League; UEFA Europa League; UEFA Conference League; UEFA Super Cup

Association football is the most popular sport in Belgium, which has been played since the end of the 19th century. Around 60% of Belgians are considered football fans. Neighbouring countries with an equal or higher percentage are France, Germany and the Netherlands. The national association was founded in 1895 with the intention of bringing some order and organization to the sport. The first match of the Belgium national team was played on 1 May 1904, a 3–3 draw against France.

Traditionally, the clubs Anderlecht, Club Brugge and Standard Liège are the three most dominant domestic teams, all of them also having played and/or won one or more UEFA competitions final(s).

== National style ==
Both the national football team and the top Belgian division have a reputation for physical play. This came as a result of a lack of technically skilled foreign players allowed to play in Belgium due to legal restrictions. This changed after the Bosman ruling which forced the liberalization of the football player market in Europe. In response, Belgian clubs began to buy unknown players from Eastern Europe, South America and Africa. This had two contradictory consequences. On the one hand, the national team was weakened by the reduced opportunity for native Belgium players to gain a spot on domestic teams. On the other hand, the Jupiler League reinforced its status as an entry league for players who then move on to some of the greatest European clubs.

Indeed, some of the most talented players in Europe have played in Belgian clubs, including Yaya Touré, Jean-Pierre Papin, Daniel Amokachi, Antolín Alcaraz and David Rozehnal were discovered at Club Brugge; Sunday Oliseh and Victor Ikpeba at RFC Liège; Jan Koller, Nii Lamptey and Aruna Dindane at Anderlecht; and Mido at Gent.

Others who began or launched their professional careers in Belgium include William Carvalho, Emmanuel Eboué, Romaric, Gervinho, Didier Zokora, Arthur Boka, Ivica Dragutinović, Mario Stanić, Morten Olsen, Dorinel Munteanu, André Cruz, Seol Ki-hyeon, Kennet Andersson, Klas Ingesson, Aaron Mokoena, Michaël Ciani, Nicolás Pareja, Oguchi Onyewu, Rabiu Afolabi, Cheick Tioté, Peter Odemwingie, Joseph Yobo, Ouwo Moussa Maazou, Milan Jovanović, Ognjen Vukojević, Ivan Perišić, Nikica Jelavić, Demba Ba, Dante, Bryan Ruiz and Rob Rensenbrink.

Because of the physical nature of Belgian football, it has tended to primarily produce talented defensive players. These include Jean-Marie Pfaff, Eric Gerets, Leo Clijsters, Michel Preud'homme, Georges Grün, Philippe Albert, Franky Van Der Elst, Vincent Kompany and Thomas Vermaelen. In comparison, only few attacking Belgian footballers have received international recognition: Enzo Scifo, Jan Ceulemans, Marc Degryse, Luc Nilis and Émile Mpenza.

However, this latter trend is slowly starting to change, with Belgium producing such offensive talents as Romelu Lukaku, Eden Hazard, Mousa Dembélé, Christian Benteke, Kevin Mirallas, Marouane Fellaini, Kevin De Bruyne and Dries Mertens, among others.

== Clubs ==
=== Matricule numbers ===
With football's rapid growth in popularity in the late 19th century, several football clubs came into existence in Belgium. In 1926, the Royal Belgian Football Association decided to introduce matricule numbers to tell the clubs apart and assigned a matricule to each existing club by order of registration. In this manner, Antwerp was awarded matricule number 1 as the first to register. As such, the oldest clubs in Belgium typically have the lowest matricule numbers, although there are clubs which registered many years after their origination and as a result have a much higher matricule than would be expected. Many clubs, especially those with very low numbers, consider their matricule number part of their heritage and past and prominently feature it in their logo or even name. In case a club dissolves, the matricule number of this club is removed permanently and lost forever as numbers are never reused.

In case of mergers, the new club must decide which matricule number to keep, it normally begins the championship at the level where the former club with the same matricule number should have begun the season. Typically, mergers result in the most famous club's matricule being kept alive. However, it has often occurred that a club with a glorious past or even (multiple) championship titles had to merge with another less successful club in order to survive, often due to financial difficulties. In this case, the matricule number of the club, and the honours linked to it, were lost with the merger. As an examples, in the late 1990s, seven-time champion K. Beerschot VAC was struggling with financial difficulties in the third division and merged with then first division neighbour club KFC Germinal Ekeren to survive. The new club was named KFC Germinal Beerschot Antwerpen and started in the first division with the matricule number of KFC Germinal Ekeren, but lost the honours of K Beerschot VAC. The new club did keep playing in the Beerschot stadium and wore the purple shirt for which Beerschot was famously known. Another famous example is that of five-time champion Daring Club de Bruxelles' merger with RR White into R White Daring Molenbeek in 1973.

From the 2010s, matricules have been sold and traded, with clubs wanting to take over the position in a (higher) series of another club acquiring these matricules in order to quickly move up one or more divisions. Examples include BX Brussels, which acquired the matricule of Bleid-Gaume in 2013, with the intent to transform and move the club from Bleid to Brussels, over 200 kilometres away. The Royal Belgian Football Association therefore enforced a new rule in 2016, stating that after a takeover, a club cannot move more than 30 kilometres from its original location.

From 2017, the Belgian FA enforced another rule, which allows clubs to buy back their old defunct matricule, which was first done by Lyra (matricule 7776) who acquired the matricule 52 of the old defunct Lyra. In 2018, Oud-Heverlee Leuven, which is the result of a merger of three clubs around the city of Leuven, changed its matricule number 6142 back to number 18 to honour the glorious past of its eldest predecessor.

The first few matricule numbers are:

1. Royal Antwerp
2. Daring Brussels
3. Club Brugge
4. RFC Liégeois
5. R. Léopold Uccle Forestoise
6. Racing Club de Bruxelles
7. K.A.A. Gent
8. R.C.S. Verviétois (no longer active)
9. R. Dolhain F.C.
10. R. Union Saint-Gilloise

=== Naming ===
A Belgian club's name usually includes the name of the town where the club plays as well as a prefix and/or suffix. Since Belgians speak three languages, French and Dutch being the main ones and German being the third official language, Belgian teams may use either language as the basis for their names. For historical reasons, many Flemish clubs changed their names from French to Dutch between the beginning of the 20th century and the late 1960s. Additionally, many clubs have experienced frequent name changes. Reasons for these include a language change, a merger, an anniversary, etc. Because of the numerous mergers between Belgian clubs, team names sometimes combine several town names (such as K. Beringen-Heusden-Zolder or Sporting West Ingelmunster-Harelbeke) which reflect mergers. In recent history, clubs representing immigrant communities have come into existence and sometimes use names that are in neither of Belgium's official languages (the now defunct clubs Türkgucun Ozburun and Türkiyemspor Zaventem, or the still-existing Agrupación Oviedo-Asturiana, existing only in a league outside the Belgian FA now, from Brussels, being examples).

Finally, a team which exists for at least 50 years may add the prefix "Royal" to its name (either in English or in the team's language). Before 1958, this right was given to any team that celebrated its 25th year of existence. Between 1958 and 1968, the rule was changed to grant the title to any team with at least 35 years of existence. Since 1968, the time limit has increased to 50 years.

The following is a partial list of common football club name prefixes and suffixes in Belgium's three official languages.

Name	French	Dutch	German
Athletic Association	Association Athlétique (A.A.)	Atletieke Associatie (A.A.)	Athletikverband (A.V.)
Athletic Club	Athletic Club (A.C.)	Atletiek Club (A.C.)	Athletik Klub (A.K.) or Athletik Club (A.C.)
Daring Club	Daring Club (D.C.)	Daring Club (D.C.)	Daring Club (D.C.)
Excelsior	Excelsior (E.)	Excelsior (E.)	Excelsior (E.)
Football Association	Association Football (A.F.)	Voetbal Vereniging (V.V.)	Fußballverband (F.V.)
Football Club	Football Club (F.C.)	Voetbalklub (V.K.) or Voetbalclub (V.C.)	Fußballverein (F.V.)
Racing Club	Racing Club (R.C.)	Racing Club (R.C.)	Racing Club (R.C.)
Royal	Royale (R.)	Koninklijke (K.)	Königliche (K.)
Royal Society	Société Royale (S.R.)	Koninklijke Maatschappij (K.M.)	Königliche Gesellschaft (K.G.)
Sport Association	Association Sportive (A.S.)	Sportvereniging (S.V.)	Sportverband (S.V.)
Sport Circle	Cercle Sportif (C.S.)	Sportkring (S.K.) or Cercle (C.)	Sportkreis (S.K.)
Sport Club	Sporting Club (S.C.)	Sportingklub/Sportklub (S.K.) or Sportingclub/Sportclub (S.C.)	Sportingverein/Sportverein (S.V.) or Sportclub/Sportingclub (S.C.)
Union	Union (U.)	Eendracht (E.)	Eintracht (E.)

=== European results ===
Anderlecht and KV Mechelen have won a European competition. Here is a list of the winners and runners-up by competition:

- UEFA Champions League:
  - Final:
    - Club Brugge (1978)
- UEFA Cup Winners' Cup:
  - Wins:
    - Anderlecht (1976 and 1978)
    - KV Mechelen (1988)
  - Finals:
    - Anderlecht (1977 and 1990)
    - Standard Liège (1982)
    - Royal Antwerp (1993)
- UEFA Cup:
  - Wins:
    - Anderlecht (1983)
  - Finals:
    - Club Brugge (1976)
    - Anderlecht (1984)
- Inter-Cities Fairs Cup:
  - Final:
    - Anderlecht (1970)
- European Super Cup:
  - Wins:
    - Anderlecht (1976 and 1978)
    - KV Mechelen (1988)

== Football in Belgium by province ==
Under the first four levels in the league system, the competition is organized by the Provinces of Belgium, with the notable exception of the three entities that were created from the 1995 breakup of the former Province of Brabant – Flemish Brabant, Walloon Brabant and the Brussels Capital Region – whose clubs are split into two former Province of Brabant wide leagues, one Flemish-speaking and one French-speaking.

=== West Flanders ===
As of the 2025–26 season, three clubs from the province of West Flanders play in the Belgian Pro League: Club Brugge, Cercle Brugge and SV Zulte-Waregem. Two clubs from the province play in the Challenger Pro League: Club NXT and KV Kortrijk.

=== East Flanders ===
Two clubs from the province of East Flanders currently play in the Belgian Pro League: KAA Gent and FCV Dender EH. There are also three clubs from East Flanders playing in the Challenger Pro League: Jong KAA Gent, SK Beveren and KSC Lokeren.

=== Antwerp ===
Antwerp Province has a long tradition of football. The first Belgian clubs were established in the city of Antwerp (Antwerp Lyon's Club, A.S. Anvers-Borgerhout, and most notably Royal Antwerp, which is the country's oldest club and which is affectionately referred to as the "Great Old" by its supporters and the media).

Three clubs from this province currently play in the top flight: Royal Antwerp, KV Mechelen and KVC Westerlo, while Beerschot and Lierse S.K. compete in the Challenger Pro League.

=== Limburg ===
Two clubs from Limburg Province currently play in the First Division A: KRC Genk and Sint-Truiden. Additionally, two clubs represent the province in the Challenger Pro League: Lommel SK and Patro Eisden.

=== Brussels Capital Region ===
Technically-speaking, greater Brussels (the City of Brussels and surrounding communities) is not a province but rather a region akin to Flanders and Wallonia. Two clubs from Brussels play in the Pro League: Anderlecht, the country's most successful club to date, and Union Saint-Gilloise, 12 time champions of Belgium, who returned to the top-flight after a 49-year absence by winning the 2020-21 season of the First Division B. They are the current holders of the Belgian Pro League, winning their first Belgian League title in 90 years in the 2024–25 Belgian Pro League. Two Brussels-based clubs also play in the Challenger Pro League: RWDM Brussels and RSCA Futures.

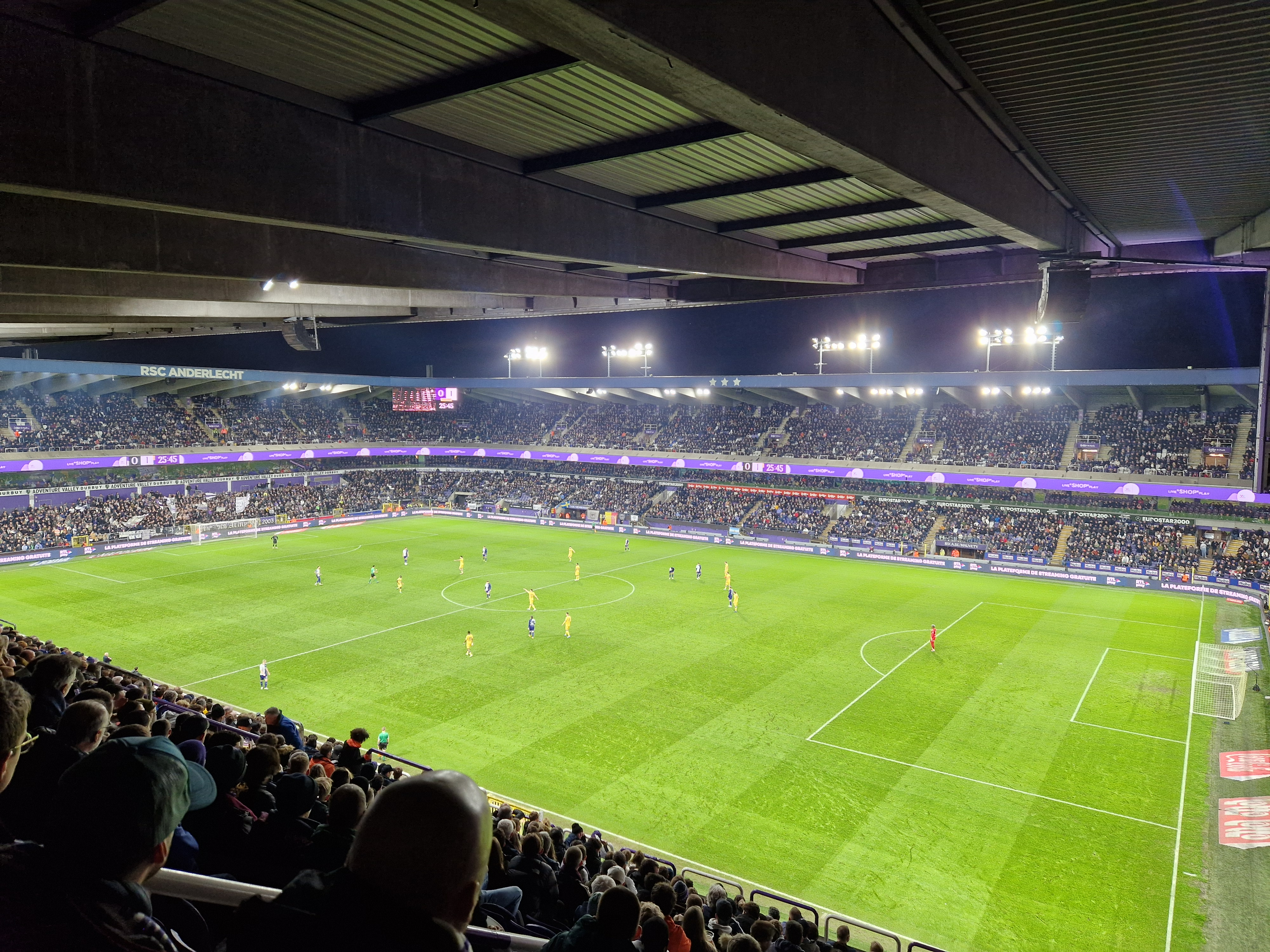
2024 First Division football game Anderlecht–Sint-Truiden

The first-ever Belgian League Championship was a competition amongst seven teams, four of which were based in Brussels: Racing Club, Léopold Club Uccle, Sporting Club and Union d'Ixelles. Léopold Club was a club for the nobility and bourgeoisie in Brussels and is still active after no less than four mergers between 1982 and 2001 (they are currently playing in the Fourth Division). The latter two clubs ceased to exist in 1897 and 1901 respectively and were replaced by a new Brussels-based club (Royale Union Saint-Gilloise), which would become a dominant force in Belgian football during the following seasons, winning seven titles between 1903 and 1913. The club originally shared a rivalry with Racing Club and later Daring Club, which would go on and win the title in 1912. Later, Anderlecht became their biggest rival for citywide bragging rights.

After World War I, Belgian football was dominated by clubs from the cities of Antwerp and Bruges. From the early 1930s, however, the Brussels-based clubs Union and Daring divided five titles between themselves. The rivalry between the two clubs has inspired a stage play named Bossemans et Coppenolle ("Bossemans" was the name of the Union head coach in those years, "Coppenolle" his counterpart at Daring). Shortly after World War II, Anderlecht replaced Union and Daring as the dominant team in Brussels. Its cross-city rivals at the time were, in succession, Union, Daring and Racing White, later renamed R.W.D.M., still later named FC Brussels. The latter were liquidated in 2014 and revived a year later as RWDM47. White Star Bruxelles, a club from the Brussels suburban region, technically won promotion to the top flight after the 2015-16 season but due to the club's debts, both the Belgian FA and the courts did not award them a licence to practice professional football. As a result, the club were relegated to the First Amateur Division and were ultimately wound up in October 2017.

=== Flemish Brabant ===
Only one club from the province of Flemish Brabant is currently active in the top two divisions of Belgian football: Oud-Heverlee Leuven, playing in the Belgian Pro League

=== Walloon Brabant ===
After the 2018-19 season, AFC Tubize were relegated to the First Amateur Division. No club from Walloon Brabant has played in the top two divisions of Belgian football since then.

=== Hainaut ===
Two teams from Hainaut Province are currently playing in Belgian Pro League: RAAL La Louvière and Charleroi SC. The Province also has two representatives in the Challenger Pro League: Francs Borains and Olympic Charleroi.

=== Namur ===
Namur Province is, along with that of Luxembourg, the province with the least prestigious football history in Belgium. Currently, no clubs from the province of Namur are playing in the top two levels of Belgian football. Furthermore, no club from this province has ever played in the top flight.

=== Liège ===
Liège Province also has a long history in Belgian football. RFC Liège won the first-ever Belgian title in 1896. The club struggled financially during the early years of the 21st century and was eventually dissolved in 2011. A new club was formed, which is currently competing in the Challenger Pro League.

Currently, one club from the province competes in Belgian Pro League: Standard Liège. A further three clubs from Liège compete in the Challenger Pro League: the aforementioned RFC Liège, R.F.C. Seraing and KAS Eupen. The latter is the only club from the German-speaking Community of Belgium (based on an administrative area in east of Liège Province) ever to have competed in the top flight. They first played at the top level in 2010–11 but were relegated after that season. They returned after the 2016–17 season, but were relegated again in 2023-24.

=== Luxembourg ===
No clubs from Luxembourg Province play in the top two levels of Belgian football: Excelsior Virton, had won promotion to the Challenger Pro League after the 2018-19 season, but were relegated in 2022-23. No club from this province has ever played in the top flight. Former Belgian international Philippe Albert (Bouillon) and current international Thomas Meunier (Sainte-Ode) were born in the province.

== League system ==
As of the 2016–17 season, the Belgian football league pyramid has nine levels. The FA dramatically overhauled the league system after the 2015–16 season, reducing the number of professional teams to 24 and introducing a nationwide amateur league for the first time.

Nationwide leagues:

1. Belgian Pro League (renamed from "First Division A" after the 2021–22 season)
2. Challenger Pro League (renamed from "First Division B" after the 2021–22 season) – replaced the former Second Division for 2016–17

Regional leagues:

1. Division 1 (renamed from "Belgian First Amateur Division" after the 2019–20 season) – introduced for 2016–17
2. Division 2 (renamed from "Belgian Second Amateur Division" after the 2019–20 season) (three leagues, two for Flemish clubs and one for Francophone clubs, with Flemish teams assigned loosely on geographic location)
3. Division 3 (renamed from "Belgian Third Amateur Division" after the 2019–20 season) (four leagues, two each for Flemish clubs and Francophone clubs, with all teams assigned loosely on geographic location)

Provincial leagues:

1. Provincial Division 1
2. Provincial Division 2
3. Provincial Division 3
4. Provincial Division 4 (except in Luxembourg and the Francophone Brabant league, where this level does not exist)

Each provincial subdivision of the FA runs its own 4-division league. Only teams that are geographically located in a certain province are allowed to compete in the corresponding provincial league. To include as well teams from the capital region of Brussels (which is not a province by itself and also does not belong to a province), teams from Brussels, Flemish Brabant and Walloon Brabant are split into two similar leagues based on their language. As a result there are two "provincial" leagues corresponding to the former Province of Brabant: one Brabant "provincial" league for Flemish clubs (including all Flemish clubs from Brussels and Flemish Brabant) and a Brabant "provincial" league for Francophone clubs (including all Francophone clubs from Brussels and Walloon Brabant). The majority of the clubs from the Brussels capital region are Francophone, de facto resulting in two provincial leagues roughly corresponding to Flemish Brabant on one hand; and Walloon Brabant and Brussels on the other hand.

== European competitions ==
=== International results by Belgian clubs ===
Reaching quarter-finals onwards:

Club	Results
Anderlecht	European Cup/UEFA Champions League: Semi-finalists in 1982 and 1986; Quarter-finalists in 1963, 1966, 1975, 1987, and 1988; Group stage (last 8) in 1994; UEFA Cup Winners' Cup: Winners in 1976 and 1978; Finalists in 1977 and 1990; UEFA Cup/UEFA Europa League: Winners in 1983; Finalists in 1984; Quarter-finalists in 1991, 1997 and 2017; Inter-Cities Fairs Cup: Finalists in 1970; UEFA Conference League: Quarter-finalists in 2023; UEFA Super Cup: Winners in 1976 and 1978
KV Mechelen	European Cup/UEFA Champions League: Quarter-finalists in 1990; UEFA Cup Winners' Cup: Winners in 1988; Semi-finalists in 1989; UEFA Super Cup: Winners in 1988
Club Brugge	European Cup/UEFA Champions League: Finalists in 1978; Quarter-finalists in 1977; Group stage (last 8) in 1993; UEFA Cup Winners' Cup: Semi-finalists in 1992; Quarter-finalists in 1971 and 1995; UEFA Cup/UEFA Europa League: Finalists in 1976; Semi-finalists in 1988; Quarter-finalists in 2015; UEFA Conference League: Semi-finalists in 2024
Standard Liège	European Cup/UEFA Champions League: Semi-finalists in 1962; Quarter-finalists in 1959, 1970, and 1972; UEFA Cup Winners' Cup: Finalists in 1982; Semi-finalists in 1967; Quarter-finalists in 1968; UEFA Cup/UEFA Europa League: Quarter-finalists in 1981 and 2010; UEFA Intertoto Cup: Finalists in 1996; Semi-finalists in 2000
Antwerp	UEFA Cup Winners' Cup: Finalists in 1993; UEFA Cup/UEFA Europa League: Quarter-finalists in 1990
Gent	UEFA Cup/UEFA Europa League: Quarter-finalists in 1992; UEFA Conference League: Quarter-finalists in 2023; UEFA Intertoto Cup: Finalists in 2006 and 2007
Genk	UEFA Cup/UEFA Europa League: Quarter-finalists in 2017; UEFA Intertoto Cup: Semi-finalists in 2004
Union Saint-Gilloise	UEFA Europa League: Quarter-finalists in 2023; Inter-Cities Fairs Cup: Semi-finalists in 1960

=== UEFA Champions League ===
The following teams have qualified for the group stage/league phase in the UEFA Champions League:

- Anderlecht (12 times: 1993–94, 1994–95, 2000–01, 2001–02, 2003–04, 2004–05, 2005–06, 2006–07, 2012–13, 2013–14, 2014–15, 2017–18)
- Club Brugge (11 times: 1992–93, 2002–03, 2003–04, 2005–06, 2016–17, 2018–19, 2019–20, 2020–21, 2021–22, 2022–23, 2024–25)
- Genk (3 times: 2002–03, 2011–12, 2019–20)
- Lierse (1997–98)
- Standard Liège (2009–10)
- Gent (2015–16)
- Antwerp (2023–24)

== Football outside the Belgian FA ==
Other than the UEFA-affiliated Royal Belgian Football Association, several amateur football leagues exist in Belgium, most at regional levels. These are often called "pub teams' leagues", although this is not entirely correct: far from all clubs represent a pub, as often there are teams enrolled who represent a town or district of a village, a company or another institution. Many amateur leagues exist in Belgium, most of them are region-bound or province-bound. Examples of amateur leagues with a long tradition include the KVV (Koninklijke Vlaamse Voetbalbond) organising provincial leagues in all Flemish provinces save for West-Vlaanderen; the MTSA for the area Dendermonde-Aalst-Denderstreek; the LVVB Melle for the area Wetteren-Ghent (with some clubs outside this area); the LVV Meetjesland for the Meetjesland area and few clubs from Ghent, the Corporative Leagues in several provinces mainly intended for company teams (although sometimes also including general amateur teams), the WALIVO in the Waasland area, the ABSSA and Travailliste leagues in Brussels and surrounding areas, ... The system is complex as some of these regional leagues are affiliated to the Belgian FA (sometimes their member clubs receive a matricule number) but the leagues are totally separate from the league system in the leagues directly run by the Belgian FA (described above). Some other amateur leagues operate totally separate from the Belgian FA with no connection to the Belgian FA in any ways. Amateur leagues are in decline in some areas due to the competition from the general Belgian FA-run leagues and due to long travel distances being unpractical at amateur level. Several clubs who started in amateur leagues have made the transfer to the leagues run directly by the Belgian FA (starting at the lowest level). Some of these clubs even managed to, after a while, reach a relatively high level of the Belgian pyramid. Many amateur leagues in the past were tied to a political ideology, and Catholic, Socialist and Liberal amateur leagues existed. Nowadays most amateur leagues are based upon geographic area rather than on political ideologies.

== Indoor football ==
In Belgium, the Belgian FA also runs a nationwide Futsal league. Clubs are given a matricule number as well, although a separate one than the matricule numbers assigned to the clubs in outdoor football. Usually the letter A is in front of the matricule number to indicate an indoor club. A separate indoor football league is organised by the BZVB (Belgische Zaalvoetbal Bond, translated as Belgian Indoor Football Association), this is not tied to the Belgian FA. Both of these leagues run at the same moment but without any interaction with each other.

In addition, Mini Football is popular in Belgium (this has different rules all together than Futsal) and this league is run by a separate FA dealing with mini football only.

== Women's football ==
Both the Belgian FA and several regional amateur football leagues run a league for women. The league operated by the Belgian FA consists of three nationwide levels, with several levels per province below. The Belgian FA started to organise women's football in the early seventies, due to the UEFA obligating every member FA to organise leagues for women as well as for men. In the beginning the Belgian FA discouraged women to play football and advised them to opt for sports such as volleyball. The first season only existing clubs (with male teams) could enrol a female team in the league. As popularity of women's football grew and more and more teams wanted to play in the league, the Belgian FA dropped the above rule and accepted new clubs to affiliate who only focussed on ladies' football. These clubs are assigned matricule numbers just like any other club, and meanwhile women's football is fully integrated in the Belgian football structure. However, the league is not professional as yet (only a few female players have been full-time professionals) and the national team is amongst the weaker teams in Europe due to other countries such as Germany, Norway, Sweden having fully professional women's leagues. Clubs who have been successful in past or present in Belgian women's football include Brussels Dames '71 (currently the women's team of Anderlecht), Rapide Wezemaal, Astro Begijnendijk, Eva's Kumtich, Sinaai Girls, Standard Fémina Liège, Dames Eendracht Aalst (previously tied to the club KSC Eendracht Aalst which was also successful in men's football).

In the early 2010s, plans existed to develop a new super league where existing clubs with professional men's teams would enroll a women's team. Eventually, the Belgian and Dutch FAs launched a joint top-level league, the BeNe League, in 2012. Before the launch of this league, several famous clubs had created women's teams, such as Club Brugge, Lierse SK, Germinal Beerschot Antwerpen, and St-Truidense VV. After the 2014–15 season, the two countries chose to disband the BeNe League and relaunch their own national top flights; the Dutch revived their women's Eredivisie, while Belgium chose instead to create a totally new top flight, the Super League.

== Largest Belgian football stadiums ==
Stadiums with a capacity of 20,000 or higher are included.

Rank	Stadium	Capacity	Tenants	City	Notes
1	King Baudouin Stadium	50,093	Belgium	Brussels	UEFA Category 4 stadium
2	Jan Breydel Stadium	29,062	Club Brugge, Cercle Brugge	Bruges	
3	Stade Maurice Dufrasne	27,670	Standard Liège	Liège	UEFA Category 3 stadium
4	Cegeka Arena	23,718	Racing Genk	Genk	UEFA Category 4 stadium
5	Lotto Park	21,500	Anderlecht	Anderlecht	UEFA Category 3 stadium
6	Planet Group Arena	20,000	KAA Gent	Ghent	

== Most successful clubs overall ==
As of 31 July 2026

local and lower league organizations are not included.

Club	Domestic Titles					European Titles				Overall titles
Club	Belgian Pro League	Belgian Cup	Belgian League Cup	Belgian Super Cup	Total	UEFA Cup Winners' Cup	UEFA Europa League	UEFA Super Cup	Total	Overall titles
RSC Anderlecht	**34**	9	**3**	13	**59**	**2**	**1**	**2**	**5**	**64**
Club Brugge KV	20	**12**	-	**18**	50	-	-	-	-	50
R Standard Liège	10	8	1	4	23	-	-	-	-	23
R Union Saint-Gilloise	12	4	-	2	18	-	-	-	-	18
KRC Genk	4	5	-	2	11	-	-	-	-	11
Royal Antwerp FC	5	4	-	1	10	-	-	-	-	10
K Beerschot VAC	7	2	-	-	9	-	-	-	-	9
KV Mechelen	4	2	-	-	6	1	-	1	2	8
K Lierse SK	4	2	-	2	8	-	-	-	-	8
R Racing Club de Bruxelles	6	1	-	-	7	-	-	-	-	7
RFC Liège	5	1	1	-	7	-	-	-	-	7
R Daring Club de Bruxelles	5	1	-	-	6	-	-	-	-	6
KSK Beveren	2	2	-	2	6	-	-	-	-	6
KAA Gent	1	4	-	1	6	-	-	-	-	6
Cercle Brugge KSV	3	2	-	-	5	-	-	-	-	5
K Beerschot AC	-	2	-	-	2	-	-	-	-	2
KSC Lokeren Oost-Vlaanderen		2	-	-	2	-	-	-	-	2
K Waterschei SV Thor Genk	-	2	-	-	2	-	-	-	-	2
SV Zulte Waregem	-	2	-	-	2	-	-	-	-	2
KSV Waregem	-	1	-	1	2	-	-	-	-	2
RWD Molenbeek	1	-	-	-	1	-	-	-	-	1
KVC Westerlo	-	1	-	-	1	-	-	-	-	1
RAA Louviéroise	-	1	-	-	1	-	-	-	-	1
RFC Tournai	-	1	-	-	1	-	-	-	-	1
KFC Lommel SK	-	-	1	-	1	-	-	-	-	1
Sint-Truidense VV	-	-	1	-	1	-	-	-	-	1

- The articles in italic indicate the defunct leagues and the defunct cups.
- The figures in **bold** indicate the most times this competition has been won by a team.

== Attendances ==
The average attendance per top-flight football league season and the club with the highest average attendance:

Season	League average	Best club	Best club average
2024–25	10,564	Club Brugge	22,496
2023–24	10,446	Club Brugge	21,702
2022–23	9,691	Club Brugge	20,763
2021–22	—	—	—
2020–21	—	—	—
2019–20	11,347	Club Brugge	25,262
2018–19	10,635	Club Brugge	24,399
2017–18	11,502	Club Brugge	26,183
2016–17	10,748	Club Brugge	26,828
2015–16	11,905	Club Brugge	26,129
2014–15	11,873	Club Brugge	26,000
2013–14	11,836	Club Brugge	25,378
2012–13	11,153	Club Brugge	24,433
2011–12	11,726	Standard de Liège	24,613
2010–11	11,574	Standard de Liège	25,125
2009–10	11,743	Standard de Liège	24,406
2008–09	11,039	Club Brugge	26,085
2007–08	11,369	Club Brugge	26,368
2006–07	10,533	Club Brugge	25,034
2005–06	10,293	Club Brugge	25,329
2004–05	9,715	Club Brugge	24,432
2003–04	9,861	RSC Anderlecht	24,160
2002–03	10,105	KRC Genk	23,851
2001–02	9,176	RSC Anderlecht	23,622
2000–01	9,757	RSC Anderlecht	24,861
1999–2000	9,721	RSC Anderlecht	24,810
1998–99	7,808	RSC Anderlecht	20,891
1997–98	7,912	RSC Anderlecht	21,353
1996–97	7,927	RSC Anderlecht	19,365
1995–96	7,294	RSC Anderlecht	18,176
1994–95	7,611	RSC Anderlecht	19,265
1993–94	7,558	RSC Anderlecht	18,265
1992–93	7,509	RSC Anderlecht	16,471
1991–92	7,542	RSC Anderlecht	17,412
1990–91	7,570	RSC Anderlecht	16,971
1989–90	8,003	RSC Anderlecht	17,912
1988–89	8,039	RSC Anderlecht	15,059
1987–88	8,663	RSC Anderlecht	16,471
1986–87	7,323	RSC Anderlecht	17,041
1985–86	7,973	RSC Anderlecht	16,147
1984–85	7,426	RSC Anderlecht	19,176
1983–84	8,863	RSC Anderlecht	19,824
1982–83	9,482	RSC Anderlecht	22,353
1981–82	10,169	RSC Anderlecht	19,294
1980–81	10,278	RSC Anderlecht	23,565
1979–80	10,579	Standard de Liège	22,235
1978–79	10,044	RSC Anderlecht	19,529
1977–78	9,984	RSC Anderlecht	18,588
1976–77	9,593	RSC Anderlecht	20,412
1975–76	9,749	RSC Anderlecht	18,611
1974–75	9,733	RSC Anderlecht	19,632
1973–74	12,396	RSC Anderlecht	21,933
1972–73	10,457	Club Brugge	18,309
1971–72	11,355	RSC Anderlecht	21,400
1970–71	10,867	Standard de Liège	21,267
1969–70	11,188	Standard de Liège	20,600
1968–69	10,735	Standard de Liège	20,600
1967–68	10,719	RSC Anderlecht	20,527
1966–67	11,018	RSC Anderlecht	20,712
1965–66	9,308	RSC Anderlecht	19,984
1964–65	8,691	RSC Anderlecht	18,111
1963–64	10,140	RSC Anderlecht	21,667

== See also ==
- List of football clubs in Belgium
- List of football stadiums in Belgium
- Football rivalries in Belgium
