= List of football clubs in Belgium =

This is a list of football clubs in Belgium by year of origin.

== List ==
Year	Club	Division (2025–26)	Notes
1880	Royal Antwerp	Belgian Pro League	Oldest club in Belgium with matricule number 1.
1891	Club Brugge	Belgian Pro League	
1892	RFC Liège	Challenger Pro League	
1897	Union SG	Belgian Pro League	
1898	Standard Liège	Belgian Pro League	
1899	Cercle Brugge	Belgian Pro League	
1899	Beerschot	Challenger Pro League	created by the merger of KFCO Wilrijk and Beerschot AC in 2013.
1900	Gent	Belgian Pro League	
1901	Kortrijk	Challenger Pro League	
1904	Sporting Charleroi	Belgian Pro League	
1904	Mechelen	Belgian Pro League	
1904	Oostende	Dissolved due to Bankruptcy	created by the merger of AS Oostende and VG Oostende in 1981
1904	RFC Seraing	Dissolved due to bankruptcy	the old RFC Seraing successor by new club, RFC Seraing
1905	Union Namur	Belgian Division 1	
1906	Royal Capellen	Belgian Division 1	
1908	Anderlecht	Belgian Pro League	Most successful club of Belgium, with 34 domestic league titles
1909	RWD Molenbeek	Dissolved due to Bankruptcy	Strictly speaking, former RWDM is hence the successor of K. Standaard Wetteren in 1953
1912	Olympic Charleroi CF	Belgian Division 1	
1912	KFC Turnhout	Belgian Division 3	Founded by chaplain Z.E. Janssens from St-Victor-institute in Turnhout
1913	RAA Louviéroise		Dissolved and Became Cercle Sportif Couillet
1921	Roeselare		Dissolved due to bankruptcy
1921	Tienen	Belgian Division 1	renamed from R.C. Tirlemont, due to French name in Tienen
1922	Excel Mouscron		Dissolved due to bankruptcy
1922	RFC Seraing	Challenger Pro League	
1922	Virton	Belgian Division 1	
1922	UR La Louvière Centre	Belgian Provincial Leagues	
1923	K.S.C. Lokeren Oost-Vlaanderen		Dissolved due to bankruptcy, merged with KSV Temse and currently play as Lokeren-Temse
1924	Sint-Truiden	Belgian Pro League	
1926	KMSK Deinze		Dissolved in 2025 after bankruptcy
1926	K.F.C. Dessel Sport	Belgian Division 1	
1926	RFC Mandel United	Belgian Division 2	
1927	URSL Visé		Bankruptcy in 2024
1933	K.V.C. Westerlo	Belgian Pro League	
1935	KSK Beveren	1st Provincial East Flanders	Merged with SK Beveren
1935	FCV Dender EH	Belgian Pro League	
1935	Patro Eisden Maasmechelen	Challenger Pro League	
1936	KVK Ninove	Belgian Division 1	
1936	SK Beveren	Challenger Pro League	renamed from Waasland-Beveren in 2022
1940	KSK Heist	Belgian Division 1	
1940	Sint-Eloois-Winkel Sport	Dissolved as First team	
1942	Thes Sport	Belgian Division 1	
1943	Lierse Kempenzonen	Challenger Pro League	created by the merger of FC Oosterzonen and Lierse in 2018
1945	Eupen	Challenger Pro League	created by the merger of La Jeunesse d'Eupen and FC Eupen 1920 in 1945
1949	Royal Francs-Borains	Challenger Pro League	
1953	Royale Union Tubize-Braine	Belgian Division 1	merged from A.F.C. Tubize and Royal Stade Brainois in 2021
1988	Genk	Belgian Pro League	created by the merger of Waterschei and Winterslag in 1988
1998	Rupel Boom	Belgian Division 2	
2001	Zulte Waregem	Belgian Pro League	created by the merger of Zultse VV and Waregem in 2001.
2002	Oud-Heverlee Leuven	Belgian Pro League	Merger of 3 clubs.
2003	Lommel SK	Challenger Pro League	
2009	RAAL La Louvière	Belgian Pro League	Merger from Racing Charleroi-Couillet-Fleurus has been dissolve of former RAA Louviéroise in 2009.
2015	RWDM Brussels	Challenger Pro League	Merger from two teams of Former RWD Molenbeek and Standard Wetteren has been dissolved when became a new club in 2015. On 6 June 2025, RWD Molenbeek officially change name to Daring Brussels from 2025–26 season, later change name to RWDM Brussels.
2020	Lokeren-Temse	Challenger Pro League	two clubs Sporting Lokeren has been dissolved on 20 April 2020 and KSV Temse was founded in 1945 merger into Lokeren-Temse in 2020
2021	Belisia Bilzen	Belgian Division 1	two clubs Spouwen-Mopertingen merged with Bilzerse Waltwilder and a new club was formed named Belisia Bilzen, taking its name after the first football club of Bilzen named Belisia, founded in 1912
2024	Diksmuide-Oostende	Belgian Division 2	two clubs KV Diksmuide merged with KV Oostende and new club was formed name Diksmuide-Oostende, due to former KV Oostende has been dissolve in 2024.
