= 2003 Belgian Cup final =

- Event: 2002–03 Belgian Cup
La Louvière	Sint-Truiden
3	1
- Date: 1 June 2003
- Venue: King Baudouin Stadium, Brussels
- Referee: Johan Verbist
- Attendance: 32,000

The 2003 Belgian Cup final, took place on 1 June 2003 between La Louvière and Sint-Truiden. It was the 48th Belgian Cup final and was won by La Louvière.

== Route to the final ==
La Louvière				Sint-Truiden
Opponent	Result	Legs	Round	Opponent	Result	Legs
Tongeren (III)	1–0	1–0 away	Sixth round	Berchem Sport (III)	3–0	3–0 home
Genk	1–1 (4–3 pen.)	1–1 away	Seventh round	Lierse	0–0 (4–3 pen.)	0–0 home
Standard Liège	3–3 (away goals)	1–3 away; 2–0 home	Quarter-finals	Anderlecht	1–1 (4–3 pen.)	0–1 away; 1–0 home
Lommel	4–3	2–3 away; 2–0 home	Semi-finals	Germinal Beerschot	1–0	1–0 home; 0–0 away

== Match ==
=== Details ===
1 June 2003
16:00 CEST

La Louvière	3–1	Sint-Truiden
Ishiaku 27', 72'; Arts 35'	Report	Buvens 83'

King Baudouin Stadium, Brussels
Attendance: 32,000
Referee: Johan Verbist

La Louvière	Sint-Truiden

GK	12	(Belgium) Jan Van Steenberghe
RB	2	(Belgium) Didier Ernst
CB	4	(Belgium) Thierry Siquet (c)
CB	21	(Belgium) Domenico Olivieri
LB	5	(Canada) Michael Klukowski
RM	17	(Belgium) Davy Cooreman
CM	6	(Belgium) Georges Arts
CM	8	(Belgium) Alan Haydock
LM	19	(Belgium) Rachid Belabed
CF	25	(Nigeria) Peter Odemwingie	(substituted off) 71'
CF	20	(Nigeria) Manasseh Ishiaku	(substituted off) 90'
Substitutes:
FW	14	(Cameroon) Emmanuel Kenmogne	(substituted on) 71'
DF	3	(Belgium) Olivier Guilmot	(substituted on) 90'
Manager:
(Belgium) Ariël Jacobs

GK	1	(Serbia and Montenegro) Dušan Belić
RB	4	(Belgium) Peter Voets (c)	(substituted off) 46'
CB	3	(Belgium) Nicky Hayen
CB	19	(Rwanda) Claude Kalisa	(substituted off) 71'
LB	14	(Belgium) Thomas Caers	(substituted off) 76'
CM	8	(Belgium) Gunter Verjans
CM	17	(Belgium) Peter Delorge
RM	13	(Belgium) Bram Vangeel
AM	15	(Rwanda) Désiré Mbonabucya
LM	25	(Belgium) Danny Boffin
CF	9	(Brazil) Marcos Pereira
Substitutes:
MF	2	(Belgium) Wouter Vrancken	(substituted on) 46'
FW	11	(Belgium) Kris Buvens	(substituted on) 71'
DF	5	(Belgium) Stijn Vangeffelen	(substituted on) 76'
Manager:
(Belgium) Jacky Mathijssen

Match rules

- 90 minutes.
- 30 minutes of extra time if necessary.
- Penalty shoot-out if scores still level.
- Seven named substitutes.
- Maximum of three substitutions.
