= 2006–07 in Belgian football =

Football in Belgium
- Season: 2006–07

The 2006–07 season is the 104th competitive season in Belgian football.

== Overview ==
Following promotion from the Belgian Second Division, Mons have returned to the Belgian First Division immediately after dropping to the second division during the 2004–2005 season. La Louvière has dropped from the first division after finishing last, they were also refused a licence which caused them to drop two levels and so they now play in the Belgian Third Division.

== Honours ==
Competition	Winner
Belgian First Division	Anderlecht
Cup	Club Brugge
Supercup	Anderlecht
Second division	Dender EH
Third division A	Tournai
Third division B	Olympic Charleroi

== Events ==
=== June ===
- June 12, 2006 – Fixtures for the 2006-07 Belgian First Division released.

=== July ===
- July 13, 2006 – Roeselare is the first Belgian team to compete in Europe this season as they take part in the first qualifying round of the UEFA Cup. They win their very first European match ever, 2–1, against Macedonian side Vardar away in Skopje.
- July 16, 2006 – In the Intertoto Cup, Gent loses the first leg of their tie with Grasshoppers Zürich 2–1 in Zürich.
- July 22, 2006 – The Belgian Supercup, played at the Constant Vanden Stock Stadium between Anderlecht and Zulte-Waregem, is abandoned at half-time at a score of 0–0 due to heavy rainfall.
- July 22, 2006 – Gent manages a 1–1 draw at home to Grasshoppers, and so does not progress to in UEFA Cup, losing 2–3 on aggregate.
- July 24, 2006 – The Profliga announced that the Supercup match between Anderlecht and Zulte-Waregem will be replayed on 1 September. However, both teams confirmed that the match will be replayed, but that they have not agreed on the date yet.
- July 27, 2006 – Roeselare qualifies for the second round of the UEFA Cup after defeating Vardar for the second time, this time by a comfortable 5–1 margin, winning 7–2 on aggregate.
- July 28, 2006 – Standard Liège escapes from big names as Valencia, Liverpool and Ajax in the UEFA Champions League draw as they get drawn together with the winner of the match between ND Gorica and Steaua București in the third qualification round. Steaua looks to become the opponent as they already have won the first leg of the match over Gorica.
- July 28, 2006 – Club Brugge and Roeselare receive their opponents in the second qualifying round of the UEFA Cup: FK Sūduva and Ethnikos Achna, respectively.
- July 28, 2006 – Club Brugge plays Gent in the first match of the domestic season, winning 5–0.
- July 29, 2006 – Official start of the first division with five more matches.

=== August ===
- August 2, 2006 – It is now sure that Steaua București will be the opponent of Standard Liège in the third qualification round of the Champions League as they also beat ND Gorica in the return leg.
- August 9, 2006 – Steaua București, the opponent of Standard Liège in the third qualification round of the Champions League, has the best chances of progressing to the group stage as the first leg ends 2–2 at Sclessin in Liège.
- August 10, 2006 – Both FK Sūduva and Ethnikos Achna FC prove not strong enough for Club Brugge and K.S.V. Roeselare respectively as both Belgian teams win their first match. K.S.V. Roeselare won 2–1 at home and still has some work to do in the return leg in Cyprus while Club Brugge looks sure of progressing to the UEFA Cup proper as they won 0–2 away from home in Sūduva stadium, Marijampolė.
- August 16, 2006 – The match between Belgium and Kazakhstan (141st on the FIFA World Rankings) ends in a scoreless 0–0 draw and just like the previous qualifying campaigns the "Red Devils" don't get off to a good start.
- August 23, 2006 – Standard Liège start good in the second leg of the third qualification round of the Champions League as they score after three minutes already away to Steaua București and almost manage to make it 0-2 a few minutes later. However, in the end they lose 2-1 after two goals from Valentin Badea. As a result, Standard Liège will play in the UEFA Cup. Elsewhere, R.S.C. Anderlecht loses to Real Madrid 2–1 in the Trofeo Santiago Bernabéu. In Belgium, the Second Division 2006-07 season gets underway, as the first matchday is played.
- August 24, 2006 – In the heat of Cyprus, K.S.V. Roeselare gets stomped 5-0 by Ethnikos Achna FC and so loses its 2–1 lead from the first leg, they are eliminated from European football for this season. Extreme amounts have been registered at the betting agencies always predicting a large win for the Cypriots, as a result UEFA is investigating this match and others of Ethnikos Achna FC for corruption/bribery. Club Brugge makes a few mistakes as Lithuanian team FK Sūduva manage to come back to 2-2 after having led 2–0, however they then pump up the pace and finally it ends 5–2. Club Brugge goes on into the Uefa Cup first round. Meanwhile, R.S.C. Anderlecht gets drawn into group H of the UEFA Champions League together with AC Milan, Lille OSC and AEK Athens. Their first match is scheduled on September 13 at home to Lille OSC.
- August 25, 2006 – The draw for the Uefa Cup first round is concluded, Club Brugge gets paired with Slovak champions MFK Ružomberok, Standard Liège has to play against Celta de Vigo from Spain and Zulte-Waregem faces a long trip to Moscow to meet up with FC Lokomotiv Moscow. Club Brugge and Zulte-Waregem get to play their first match away from home, Standard Liège starts with hosting the first leg.
- August 30, 2006 – Johan Boskamp gets fired as manager of Standard Liège after only scoring 2 out of 12 in the league and failure to qualify for the UEFA Champions League. The technical director at Standard Liège, Michel Preud'homme, takes over his job.

=== September ===
- September 6, 2006 – After the bad start to the UEFA Euro 2008 qualifying campaign, Belgium now beats Armenia in Yerevan by a narrow 1-0 margin. Daniel Van Buyten scores with a well placed header a few minutes before halftime. Belgium played a moderate match with low quality of play, however the abominable state of the field was also a reason for that.
- September 9, 2006 – In the first division, on matchday 5, leaders R.S.C. Anderlecht lose their perfect record as a late goal by R.E. Mouscron's Adnan Ćustović ends the game in a 1–1 draw. Meanwhile, Standard Liège win their first match of the season, 1–3 away to Lierse S.K.
- September 11, 2006 – It is announced that the Belgian Supercup between league champions R.S.C. Anderlecht and cup winners S.V. Zulte-Waregem, which was originally abandoned at half time due to excessive rain on July 22, will be replayed on 20 December.
- September 13, 2006 – R.S.C. Anderlecht has not won their opening match for several years in the UEFA Champions League and also this year they don't manage to win. Against Lille OSC, the match ends in a 1–1 draw as both teams had several chances, Anderlecht mainly in the first half and Lille mainly in the second half.
- September 14, 2006 – FC Lokomotiv Moscow is very patient as they wait for good chances to appear against S.V. Zulte-Waregem in the Uefa Cup first round match and their tactics seem to pay off as after 90 minutes Loskov and Ivanović have set the 2–0 on the board. However, in the 94th minute, Jonas Vandermarliere scores the all-important away goal and thereby causes the return match to be very exciting. Meanwhile, Standard Liège is overrun for 90 minutes at home as they struggle to create any chances against Celta de Vigo, in the end they're lucky to just lose 0-1 and as they leave the field, they are booed by the home crowd. In Slovakia, Club Brugge struggles in the opening few minutes against MFK Ružomberok, but then they take over and after a free-kick goal by Boško Balaban they control the match to prevent the Slovak team from scoring, in which they succeed to make for a 1–0 victory away from home.
- September 26, 2006 – Again a 1–1 draw for R.S.C. Anderlecht in the UEFA Champions League, this time against AEK Athens. Anderlecht took the lead in the first half through Nicolás Frutos but the equaliser followed just minutes later from Júlio César.
- September 28, 2006 – Return matches of the first round of the UEFA Cup 2006-07: Standard Liège plays a decent match, but when Karel Geraerts misses a penalty kick, the morale is gone and eventually Celta de Vigo wins the return match 3–0. Against MFK Ružomberok, Club Brugge plays very poorly but eventually they go through after a last minute equaliser by Boško Balaban. The stunt of the day comes from S.V. Zulte-Waregem as they beat FC Lokomotiv Moscow 2–0 at home to go through into the group stage.
- September 30, 2006 – In the first division, joint leaders R.S.C. Anderlecht and K.R.C. Genk play against each other on the 8th matchday. Anderlecht, at that time recognised by many as the most probable champions for the current season solely on strength of the squad, loses out 1–4 on their home ground, where they had not been beaten since February 2005. Genk are the new leaders.

=== October ===
- October 3, 2006 – The draw for the Uefa Cup 2006-07 Group Stage is concluded, with Club Brugge ending up in group B together with Bayer Leverkusen, Beşiktaş, Dinamo Bucharest and Tottenham Hotspur while S.V. Zulte-Waregem gets paired with Ajax, Sparta Prague, Espanyol and Austria Vienna in group F.
- October 6, 2006 – The KBVB/URBSFA met with representatives of the city of Brussels and together they agreed to renew the contract concerning the King Baudouin Stadium and extend it to June 30, 2008. As of November 15, 2006 against Poland national football team on, the Belgium national team will play in the King Baudouin Stadium again.
- October 7, 2006 – In the 2008 UEFA European Football Championship qualifying tournament, Belgium loses 1–0 to Serbia in Belgrade. In the first half, the Belgians never got into trouble but did not create many chances themselves, while in the second half it was Serbia having control. Serbia scored with more than half an hour to go through Nikola Žigić and Belgium tried to respond, but never managed to score.
- October 11, 2006 – Belgium easily beats Azerbaijan 3–0 in Anderlecht. For the first time since long, the Belgian team manages to score more than one goal when it matters.
- October 17, 2006 – After a red card for Daniele Bonera early in the second half, it looked promising for R.S.C. Anderlecht to take some points in the UEFA Champions League match at home to A.C. Milan. However they did not manage to score whereas Kaká for Milan did with a slightly deviated shot from about 20 meters. The game ended 0–1.
- October 19, 2006 – In the UEFA Cup 2006-07, Bayer Leverkusen holds Club Brugge to a 1–1 draw in Bruges. In Vienna, S.V. Zulte-Waregem beats Austria Vienna 4–1 with the help of three goals from Tim Matthys.
- October 21–22, 2006 – Apart from Mons, who already joined (and got eliminated) in round 4, the other teams from the first division enter the Belgian Cup in round 6 during this weekend. Charleroi, Beveren and Lokeren lose to Hamme, Lierse and Antwerp respectively on Saturday. While on Sunday Cercle Brugge and Brussels, two more teams from the first division are also knocked out of the cup. With one more match of Round 6 to go, only 11 remain. For Lierse, this is the very first victory this season, as they are in last position in the league with just 1 point out of 9 matches.
- October 25, 2006 – KV Mechelen is the last team to qualify for Round 7 of the Belgian Cup as they beat Germinal Beerschot 1-0 after extra time.
- October 26, 2006 – The draw for the Seventh round of the Belgian Cup yields no big clashes as Standard Liège and R.S.C. Anderlecht get home matches against Division Two teams and RC Genk and Club Brugge also play at home against Mouscron and Westerlo.
- October 29, 2006 – After losing in the cup to Belgian Second Division team Antwerp and a 4–1 loss to Westerlo in the league, Ariël Jacobs is the second manager to get fired this season as he is sacked by Lokeren.

=== November ===
- November 1, 2006 – R.S.C. Anderlecht loses by a harsh 4-1 margin to A.C. Milan in the UEFA Champions League, although they had numerous chances in the last half-hour to come back to 3–2. Kaká had however already scored three times.
- November 2, 2006 – In the UEFA Cup 2006-07, S.V. Zulte-Waregem surprises again as they now beat Sparta Prague 3–1, they are now almost sure of qualification for the next round. Meanwhile, Club Brugge has a lot of work to do as they lose 3–1 to Tottenham Hotspur F.C.
- November 7, 2006 – Thomas Caers quits his job as manager of Sint Truiden as he feels the players don't respect him anymore after a series of bad results. Meanwhile, rumours are saying Lokeren could soon be giving Slavoljub Muslin a contract with the club as their new manager.
- November 13, 2006 – René Trost agrees with the management of Lierse to split up and each go their own way. At that time Lierse is in last position, with two points out of 12 matches.
- November 15, 2006 – The Belgium national team loses their home match against Poland 0-1 after a shameful performance in which they did not succeed in creating good scoring opportunities.
- November 21, 2006 – R.S.C. Anderlecht is eliminated from the UEFA Champions League as they play 2–2 in Lyon against Lille OSC, but since AEK Athens beats A.C. Milan 1–0 at home, R.S.C. Anderlecht can only finish third at best.
- November 22, 2006 – Lierse finds a new manager as Kjetil Rekdal is contracted to try to keep the team in the first division. In Sint Truiden, Henk Houwaart is the new manager.
- November 23, 2006 – In the UEFA Cup 2006–07, Club Brugge plays a good match but is not rewarded as they only manage a 1–1 draw against Romanian side Dinamo Bucharest, they now need to win against Beşiktaş J.K. to have a chance of progressing. In Barcelona, S.V. Zulte-Waregem gets beaten 6-2 by Espanyol and so they lose their good looking goal difference, however they still have a good chance of progressing.
- November 26, 2006 – Lokeren announces that Slavoljub Muslin will sign a contract as the new manager within the next few days.
- November 29, 2006 – Beşiktaş J.K. beats Club Brugge 2-1 and thereby eliminates Club Brugge in UEFA Cup 2006-07.
- November 30, 2006 – Because of beneficial results in Group F, S.V. Zulte-Waregem is qualified for the next round of the UEFA Cup 2006-07 without playing themselves. They still have one match left in the group phase against Ajax Amsterdam.

=== December ===
- December 6, 2006 – In the UEFA Champions League, R.S.C. Anderlecht gives away a 2–0 lead to AEK Athens to end in a 2–2 draw, but would have been eliminated from European football entirely anyway, as Lille OSC beat A.C. Milan in Milan 2–0.
- December 8, 2006 – RC Genk, already sure of being in first position at the half way mark of the championship after only 15 out of 34 matches, lose their first match of the season in and against Charleroi by a big 4-1 margin. However they still have six-point lead over R.S.C. Anderlecht and seven over Club Brugge, although both those teams have played one match less and so could close in to three and four points respectively with just one match to go before the winter-break.
- December 13, 2006 – Ajax Amsterdam is too strong for S.V. Zulte-Waregem, as Zulte-Waregem gets beaten 0–3 at home in the UEFA Cup 2006-07. However they were already sure of qualifying for the next round.
- December 15, 2006 – In the draw for the UEFA Cup 2006-07 Round of 32, S.V. Zulte-Waregem gets paired with Newcastle United F.C. The winner of the tie will face the winner of Fenerbahçe against AZ Alkmaar.
- December 16, 2006 – On the last day of the first half of the season, Lierse finally manages to win a match in the first division as they beat Lokeren 1–0. RC Genk end 2006 with 40 points, three points clear of R.S.C. Anderlecht and seven over Gent. Club Brugge are nine points behind but have one match left against their city-rivals, Cercle Brugge.
- December 20, 2006 – The Belgian Supercup, originally planned to be played on July 22 but abandoned due to heavy rainfall, is won by title-holders R.S.C. Anderlecht as they beat cup-winners S.V. Zulte-Waregem 3–1.

=== January ===
- January 13–14, 2007 – In the Seventh round of the Belgian Cup, the current top five of the first division all progress to the quarter-finals together with Division Two teams Antwerp, Kortrijk and KV Mechelen.
- January 17, 2007 – RC Genk and R.S.C. Anderlecht are paired together in the draw for the quarter-finals for the Belgian Cup. The other matches are Antwerp vs. Standard Liège, Club Brugge vs. Kortrijk and Gent vs. KV Mechelen.
- January 17, 2007 – Mbark Boussoufa of R.S.C. Anderlecht wins the Belgian Golden Shoe as the best player of 2006. In the second half of the 2005–06 season he helped Gent to reach fourth place and in the current season he was one of the better players of Anderlecht. Anderlecht is the big winner of the day as the top-4 of the overall rankings are also Anderlecht players and all the side awards go to Anderlecht players, Daniel Zítka is chosen to be the best goalkeeper, Lucas Biglia wins the rookie of the year award and Mohammed Tchité scored the most beautiful goal of the season, away to Brussels.
- January 28, 2007 – After losing 0–1 at home to Roeselare and a disappointing fifth place in the standings, 12 points behind leaders RC Genk, Emilio Ferrera is fired as manager of Club Brugge. Cedomir Janevski is appointed as the new manager.

=== February ===
- February 1, 2007 – At R.E. Mouscron, Gil Vandenbrouck resigns after disappointing results and is given another job at the club. Ariël Jacobs is the new coach.
- February 7, 2007 – The Red Devils lose 0–2 at home to the Czech Republic. Yet another bad result makes few people in Belgium believe that Belgium will not lose to Portugal in March.
- February 14, 2007 – In Ghent, Zulte-Waregem loses 3–1 to Newcastle United in the first leg of their Round of 32 match in the UEFA Cup.
- February 22, 2007 – In the UEFA Cup, the return match in Newcastle upon Tyne is also lost as Obafemi Martins scores the only goal in the match for Newcastle United. Zulte-Waregem is now eliminated, but after beating Lokomotiv Moscow, Sparta Prague and Austria Wien and having played against Espanyol Barcelona, Ajax Amsterdam and Newcastle United the team has had an exceptional season in Europe, certainly as it's only their second season back at the highest level of Belgian football. With this elimination, all Belgian teams have now been eliminated from European football.
- February 28, 2007 – In the league, K.R.C. Genk and R.S.C. Anderlecht seem to be the two only teams left able to win the title as they are several points ahead of Standard Liège and K.A.A. Gent in third and fourth. With a match Genk vs. Anderlecht coming up in two weeks which will probably be decisive for the championship, all eyes are on the quarter-finals of the Belgian Cup match between both those teams. In a very exciting match, Anderlecht wins the first leg 0–1 in Genk and has a good chance to progress to the semi-finals. The other quarter finals: Antwerp 0-1 Standard Liège, Club Brugge 2-1 Kortrijk and Gent 2-1 KV Mechelen.

=== March ===
- March 11, 2007 – The Genk–Anderlecht match ends in a 1–1 draw, meaning Genk retains its two-point lead over Anderlecht with nine matches to play.
- March 24, 2007 – Belgium loses 4–0 to Portugal in a qualifying match for Euro 2008. After a scoreless first-half, Cristiano Ronaldo and Ricardo Quaresma lead Portugal to victory.

== National team ==
After failing to qualify for the 2006 World Cup, Belgium will attempt to qualify for UEFA Euro 2008.

Date	Venue	Location	Opponents	Score	Competition	Belgium scorers	Match Report
August 16, 2006	Constant Vanden Stock Stadium (H)	(Belgium) Anderlecht	Kazakhstan	0–0	ECQ		Uefa.com
September 6, 2006	Hrazdan Stadium (A)	(Armenia) Yerevan	Armenia	1–0	ECQ	Van Buyten 41'	Uefa.com
October 7, 2006	Stadion Crvena Zvezda (A)	(Serbia) Belgrade	Serbia	0–1	ECQ		Uefa.com
October 11, 2006	Constant Vanden Stock Stadium (H)	(Belgium) Anderlecht	Azerbaijan	3–0	ECQ	Simons 24' (pen); Vandenbergh 47'; Dembélé 82'	Uefa.com
November 15, 2006	King Baudouin Stadium (H)	(Belgium) Brussels	Poland	0–1	ECQ		Uefa.com
February 7, 2007	King Baudouin Stadium (H)	(Belgium) Brussels	Czech Republic	0–2	F		Uefa.com
March 24, 2007	Estádio José Alvalade (A)	(Portugal) Lisbon	Portugal	0–4	ECQ		Uefa.com
June 2, 2007	King Baudouin Stadium (H)	(Belgium) Brussels	Portugal	1–2	ECQ	Fellaini 55'	Uefa.com
June 6, 2007	Olympic Stadium (A)	(Finland) Helsinki	Finland	0–2	ECQ		Uefa.com

Key

- H = Home match
- A = Away match
- F = Friendly
- ECQ = European Championship Qualifier

== European club results ==
Date	Team	Competition	Round	Leg	Opponent	Location	Score
July 13	Roeselare	UEFA Cup	Qual. Round 1	Leg 1, Away	(North Macedonia) FK Vardar	Skopje	2–1
July 16	Gent	Intertoto Cup	Round 3	Leg 1, Away	(Switzerland) Grasshoppers	Zürich	1–2
July 22	Gent	Intertoto Cup	Round 3	Leg 2, Home	(Switzerland) Grasshoppers	Ghent	1–1
July 27	Roeselare	UEFA Cup	Qual. Round 1	Leg 2, Home	(North Macedonia) FK Vardar	Roeselare	5–1
August 9	Standard	Champions League	Qual. Round 3	Leg 1, Home	(Romania) Steaua București	Liège	2–2
August 10	Club Brugge	UEFA Cup	Qual. Round 2	Leg 1, Away	(Lithuania) FK Sūduva	Marijampolė	2–0
August 10	Roeselare	UEFA Cup	Qual. Round 2	Leg 1, Home	(Cyprus) Ethnikos Achna	Roeselare	2–1
August 23	Standard	Champions League	Qual. Round 3	Leg 2, Away	(Romania) Steaua București	Bucharest	1–2
August 24	Club Brugge	UEFA Cup	Qual. Round 2	Leg 2, Home	(Lithuania) FK Sūduva	Bruges	5–2
August 24	Roeselare	UEFA Cup	Qual. Round 2	Leg 2, Away	(Cyprus) Ethnikos Achna	Achna	0–5
September 13	Anderlecht	Champions League	Group H	Match 1, Home	(France) Lille	Anderlecht	1–1
September 14	Club Brugge	UEFA Cup	Round 1	Leg 1, Away	(Slovakia) MFK Ružomberok	Ružomberok	1–0
September 14	Standard	UEFA Cup	Round 1	Leg 1, Home	(Spain) Celta Vigo	Liège	0–1
September 14	Zulte-Waregem	UEFA Cup	Round 1	Leg 1, Away	(Russia) Lokomotiv Moscow	Moscow	1–2
September 26	Anderlecht	Champions League	Group H	Match 2, Away	(Greece) AEK Athens	Athens	1–1
September 28	Club Brugge	UEFA Cup	Round 1	Leg 2, Home	(Slovakia) MFK Ružomberok	Bruges	1–1
September 28	Standard	UEFA Cup	Round 1	Leg 2, Away	(Spain) Celta Vigo	Vigo	0–3
September 28	Zulte-Waregem	UEFA Cup	Round 1	Leg 2, Home	(Russia) Lokomotiv Moscow	Ghent	2–0
October 17	Anderlecht	Champions League	Group H	Match 3, Home	(Italy) Milan	Anderlecht	0–1
October 19	Club Brugge	UEFA Cup	Group B	Match 1, Home	(Germany) Bayer Leverkusen	Bruges	1–1
October 19	Zulte-Waregem	UEFA Cup	Group F	Match 1, Away	Austria Wien	Vienna	4–1
November 1	Anderlecht	Champions League	Group H	Match 4, Away	(Italy) Milan	Milan	1–4
November 2	Club Brugge	UEFA Cup	Group B	Match 2, Away	(England) Tottenham Hotspur	Tottenham	1–3
November 2	Zulte-Waregem	UEFA Cup	Group F	Match 2, Home	(Czech Republic) Sparta Prague	Ghent	3–1
November 21	Anderlecht	Champions League	Group H	Match 5, Away	(France) Lille	Lille	2–2
November 23	Club Brugge	UEFA Cup	Group B	Match 3, Home	(Romania) Dinamo București	Bruges	1–1
November 23	Zulte-Waregem	UEFA Cup	Group F	Match 3, Away	(Spain) Espanyol	Barcelona	2–6
November 30	Club Brugge	UEFA Cup	Group B	Match 4, Away	(Turkey) Beşiktaş	Istanbul	1–2
December 6	Anderlecht	Champions League	Group H	Match 6, Home	(Greece) AEK Athens	Anderlecht	2–2
December 13	Zulte-Waregem	UEFA Cup	Group F	Match 4, Away	(Netherlands) Ajax	Ghent	0–3
February 14	Zulte-Waregem	UEFA Cup	Round of 32	Leg 1, Home	(England) Newcastle United	Ghent	1–3
February 22	Zulte-Waregem	UEFA Cup	Round of 32	Leg 2, Away	(England) Newcastle United	Newcastle upon Tyne	0–1

== 2007–08 European qualification ==
Competition	Qualifiers	Reason for Qualification
UEFA Champions League Third Qualifying Round	Anderlecht	1st in first division
UEFA Champions League Second Qualifying Round	Genk	2nd in first division
UEFA Cup	Standard Liège	3rd in first division
UEFA Cup	Club Brugge	Cup winners
UEFA Intertoto Cup 3rd round	Gent	Highest first division finishers (4th) to have entered and not qualified for any other European competition

== See also ==
- 2006–07 Belgian First Division
- 2006–07 Belgian Cup
- 2007 Belgian Super Cup
- Belgian Second Division
- Belgian Third Division A
- Belgian Third Division B
