= 2006–07 Belgian First Division =

104th season of top-tier football in Belgium

Belgian First Division
- Season: 2006–07
- Champions: Anderlecht
- Relegated: Lierse; Beveren
- Champions League: Anderlecht; Genk
- UEFA Cup: Standard Liège; Club Brugge
- Matches: 306
- Goals: 853 (2.79 per match)
- Top goalscorer: François Sterchele (21 goals)

The 2006–07 season of the Belgian First Division began on July 28, 2006, and concluded on May 19, 2007. The championship was decided in the penultimate round on May 12, 2007, when Anderlecht moved five points clear of runners-up Genk to retain the title and win their 29th League Championship. At the other end of the table, the struggle to avoid automatic relegation went on until the final round, and it was Lierse who eventually prevailed. Having spent the entire season at the bottom of the standings and only just managing to close an eleven-point gap up to 17th, the Lier side won their last game to climb past Beveren and send the latter down to the Second Division. However, Lierse went on to lose the playoffs and was relegated anyway.

== Clubs ==
Eighteen teams played in the 2006-07 first division. Twelve teams were from Flanders, four clubs from Wallonia and just two clubs from the Brussels-Capital Region.

=== New teams ===
La Louvière had been relegated at the end of the previous season with Mons replacing them as they won the Belgian Second Division. Lierse had managed to win the promotion playoff and thus they remained in the first division.

=== Overview ===
Location of teams in Belgian First Division 2006–07

Club	Location	Current manager	Previous managers during Season 2006-2007
R.S.C. Anderlecht	Anderlecht	(Belgium) Franky Vercauteren	none
Standard Liège	Liège	(Belgium) Michel Preud'homme	(Netherlands) Johan Boskamp
Club Brugge	Bruges	(North Macedonia) Cedomir Janevski	(Belgium) Emilio Ferrera
K.A.A. Gent	Ghent	(Belgium) Georges Leekens	none
K.R.C. Genk	Genk	(Belgium) Hugo Broos	none
K.F.C. Germinal Beerschot	Antwerp	(Belgium) Marc Brys	none
S.V. Zulte-Waregem	Waregem	(Belgium) Francky Dury	none
K.S.C. Lokeren Oost-Vlaanderen	Lokeren	(Serbia) Slavoljub Muslin	(Belgium) Ariël Jacobs
K.V.C. Westerlo	Westerlo	(Belgium) Herman Helleputte	none
F.C. Molenbeek Brussels Strombeek	Sint-Jans-Molenbeek	(France) Albert Cartier	none
R. Charleroi S.C.	Charleroi	(Belgium) Philippe Van de Walle	(Belgium) Jacky Mathijssen
K.S.V. Roeselare	Roeselare	(Belgium) Dirk Geeraerd	none
R.E. Mouscron	Mouscron	(Belgium) Ariël Jacobs	(Belgium) Gil Vandenbrouck
Cercle Brugge K.S.V.	Bruges	(Belgium) Harm van Veldhoven	none
K. Sint-Truidense V.V.	Sint-Truiden	(Belgium) Peter Voets	(Belgium) Thomas Caers, (Netherlands) Henk Houwaart
K.S.K. Beveren	Beveren	(Belgium) Edy De Bolle	(Belgium) Walter Meeuws
Lierse S.K.	Lier	(Norway) Kjetil Rekdal	(Netherlands) René Trost
R.A.E.C. Mons	Mons	(Belgium) José Riga	none

=== Manager changes ===
- August 30 - Standard Liège fires Johan Boskamp.
- August 30 - Michel Preud'homme quits his job as technical director to take up the job of manager with Standard Liège.
- October 29 - Lokeren fires Ariël Jacobs.
- November 7 - Thomas Caers quits his job as manager of Sint Truiden as he feels the players don't respect him anymore after a series of bad results.
- November 13 - René Trost agrees with the management of Lierse to split up and each go their own way. At that time Lierse is in last position, with two points out of 12 matches.
- November 22 - Lierse finds a new manager as Kjetil Rekdal is contracted to try to keep the team in the first division. In Sint Truiden, Henk Houwaart is the new manager.
- November 26 - Lokeren announces that Slavoljub Muslin will sign a contract as the new manager within the next few days.
- January 28 - After losing 0-1 at home to Roeselare, the staff of Club Brugge is under fire from supporters and media yet again. The day after, coach Emilio Ferrera and assistant Franky Van der Elst get fired and sports director Marc Degryse chooses to resign himself. A former Macedonian ex-player, Cedomir Janevski, is appointed as the new manager.
- February 1 - At R.E. Mouscron, Gil Vandenbrouck resigns after disappointing results and is given another job at the club. Ariël Jacobs is the new coach.
- March 19 - Marc Brys announces he will finish the season as trainer at K.F.C. Germinal Beerschot, but will then quit his job. No new trainer is announced to replace him.
- March 25 - Walter Meeuws is fired at K.S.K. Beveren, assistant-coach Edy De Bolle becomes caretaker until the end of the season.
- March 26 - Next season, Cercle Brugge K.S.V. coach Harm Van Veldhoven will take up the job at K.F.C. Germinal Beerschot. Cercle Brugge are looking for a new coach.
- April 3 - Sint-Truiden fires Henk Houwaart. Assistant-trainer Peter Voets takes over.
- April 15 - At Lokeren, assistant coach Rudy Cossey announces he will leave the club after 12 years and take up the job of head coach at second division team Oud-Heverlee Leuven next season. In Leuven, Guido Brepoels had announced a few weeks earlier that he was leaving at the end of the season to take up the job at another second division team, KVSK United.
- April 20 - Ariël Jacobs, head coach at Mouscron, is named by many sources to become the new assistant coach of Franky Vercauteren at Anderlecht next season. Glen De Boeck, his assistant coach at that time, is applying for a job at Cercle Brugge. Franky Van der Elst is doing the same thing and a decision concerning the new coaching team of Cercle Brugge for the new season is said to be announced soon.
- April 23 - Glen De Boeck will be the head coach of Cercle Brugge during the upcoming season.
- April 26 - Club Brugge announces that Charleroi coach Jacky Mathijssen will be their new head coach for the upcoming season. Coach Cedomir Janevski is offered a position as his assistant but is still considering the offer.
- April 28 - As both Club Brugge and Charleroi are still in the running for the fifth place and thus also possibly a ticket for European football next season, chairman Abbas Bayat decides to fire coach Jacky Mathijssen. Later that day the supporters chant Mathijssen's name during the match between Charleroi and Lokeren to express their unhappiness with Bayat's decision. Philippe Van de Walle is the caretaker for the four remaining matches of the season.

== League standings ==
Pos	Team	Pld	W	D	L	GF	GA	GD	Pts	Qualification or relegation
1	Anderlecht (C)	34	23	8	3	75	30	+45	77	Qualification to Champions League third qualifying round
2	Genk	34	22	6	6	71	37	+34	72	Qualification to Champions League second qualifying round
3	Standard Liège	34	19	7	8	62	38	+24	64	Qualification to UEFA Cup second qualifying round
4	Gent	34	18	6	10	56	40	+16	60	Qualification to Intertoto Cup second round
5	Charleroi	34	17	9	8	51	40	+11	60	
6	Club Brugge	34	14	9	11	58	40	+18	51	Qualification to UEFA Cup first round
7	Germinal Beerschot	34	14	9	11	52	46	+6	51	
8	Westerlo	34	12	10	12	41	44	−3	46	
9	Mons	34	12	8	14	41	41	0	44	
10	Mouscron	34	10	12	12	51	55	−4	42	
11	Roeselare	34	10	9	15	50	72	−22	39	
12	Cercle Brugge	34	10	8	16	31	36	−5	38	
13	Molenbeek Brussels Strombeek	34	8	14	12	39	50	−11	38	
14	Zulte Waregem	34	9	10	15	40	54	−14	37	
15	Sint-Truiden	34	9	8	17	39	52	−13	35	
16	Lokeren	34	5	15	14	32	48	−16	30	
17	Lierse (R)	34	6	8	20	33	66	−33	26	Qualification to the Relegation play-offs
18	Beveren (R)	34	5	10	19	31	64	−33	25	Relegation to 2007–08 Belgian Second Division

(C) Champions; (R) Relegated

== Promotion and relegation playoff ==
Pos	Team	Pld	W	D	L	GF	GA	GD	Pts	Promotion or relegation
1	Mechelen (P)	6	5	1	0	11	3	+8	16	Promotion to 2007–08 Belgian First Division
2	Antwerp	6	3	1	2	7	4	+3	10	
3	Lierse (R)	6	3	0	3	10	8	+2	9	Relegation to 2007–08 Belgian Second Division
4	Kortrijk	6	0	0	6	4	17	−13	0	

(P) Promoted; (R) Relegated

== Results ==
Home \ Away	AND	GBA	BEV	CER	CLU	CHA	GNK	GNT	LIE	LOK	BRU	MON	MOU	ROE	STV	STA	WES	ZWA
Anderlecht		1–0	8–1	2–0	1–0	3–2	1–4	1–0	2–0	2–0	6–0	4–1	2–1	3–2	2–0	1–0	1–0	0–0
Germinal Beerschot	1–3		1–0	1–0	4–0	1–1	2–1	0–3	2–3	1–2	3–0	2–1	6–2	3–0	3–2	1–3	0–0	1–1
Beveren	1–1	1–1		1–1	0–2	2–2	0–5	1–0	1–1	3–2	2–2	0–0	3–1	2–2	1–2	0–3	0–3	1–0
Cercle Brugge	0–1	1–2	2–2		1–0	0–0	0–1	0–1	2–1	0–0	1–0	3–0	2–1	1–1	0–1	0–2	4–1	2–0
Club Brugge	2–2	1–0	2–0	3–3		2–0	0–1	5–0	4–0	2–2	4–1	0–0	5–1	0–1	1–0	4–4	2–0	4–1
Charleroi	1–1	3–3	2–1	2–1	1–1		4–1	1–0	0–0	4–3	1–0	1–0	1–0	2–1	2–1	2–5	1–2	2–1
Genk	1–1	4–0	1–0	3–0	0–0	0–2		3–1	3–0	1–0	3–1	5–1	3–2	3–0	2–0	1–1	3–1	3–1
Gent	2–1	1–2	2–1	0–2	0–0	2–1	1–3		4–0	3–1	3–3	4–1	1–3	2–0	3–1	2–1	2–0	1–1
Lierse	1–4	2–3	0–1	0–2	1–2	2–1	0–3	1–4		1–0	0–1	0–0	3–3	3–1	0–0	1–3	1–1	1–0
Lokeren	1–1	0–0	2–0	2–0	3–2	0–0	0–1	1–1	1–4		0–0	0–2	1–1	1–1	1–1	2–1	1–1	0–2
Brussels	0–1	1–2	2–0	0–0	1–1	0–2	3–1	1–1	2–1	0–0		1–0	1–1	6–2	2–2	0–3	0–1	2–0
Mons	3–1	2–1	1–0	1–0	1–0	1–2	5–0	0–1	1–1	1–0	1–1		1–0	6–1	2–0	2–3	1–1	0–0
Mouscron	1–1	1–0	4–2	2–1	2–1	2–1	2–2	0–3	2–2	1–1	2–2	2–2		2–2	1–0	2–0	4–0	3–0
Roeselare	0–5	1–1	2–1	1–0	3–2	1–3	3–3	1–3	2–0	2–2	1–1	2–1	2–1		3–2	2–3	2–0	3–1
Sint-Truiden	2–4	2–0	3–2	2–0	2–3	1–1	1–2	0–1	4–0	1–0	2–2	1–0	1–1	1–1		0–3	0–2	2–2
Standard Liège	0–0	2–2	0–0	1–0	1–0	1–2	2–1	0–1	3–2	3–1	2–1	1–0	2–0	2–1	1–2		3–0	1–1
Westerlo	3–4	1–1	2–0	0–0	1–2	0–1	0–1	1–1	2–0	4–1	1–1	2–1	1–0	2–1	1–0	1–1		4–2
Zulte-Waregem	0–4	0–2	2–1	1–2	2–1	1–0	2–2	3–2	2–1	1–1	0–1	1–2	0–0	4–2	3–0	3–1	2–2	

Legend: Blue = home team win; Yellow = draw; Red = away team win.

== Top scorers ==
Player			Team	Goals
1	(Belgium)	François Sterchele	Germinal Beerschot	21
2	(Nigeria)	Patrick Ogunsoto	Westerlo	20
	(Democratic Republic of the Congo)	Mohammed Tchité	Anderlecht	20
4	(Bosnia and Herzegovina)	Adnan Ćustović	Mouscron	18
5	(Croatia)	Boško Balaban	Club Brugge	16
6	(Togo)	Adékambi Olufadé	Gent	15
7	(Argentina)	Nicolás Frutos	Anderlecht	14
	(Serbia)	Milan Jovanović	Standard Liège	14
9	(Egypt)	Ahmed Hassan	Anderlecht	12
10	(Belgium)	Dieter Dekelver	Cercle Brugge (4) and Westerlo (7)	11
	(Mali)	Mahamadou Dissa	Beveren	11
	(Croatia)	Goran Ljubojević	Genk	11
	(Belgium)	Kevin Vandenbergh	Genk	11

== Attendances ==
No.	Club	Average attendance	Change	Highest
1	Club Brugge	25,034	-1,2%	28,132
2	Anderlecht	24,575	2,0%	25,646
3	Standard de Liège	22,846	-1,8%	26,600
4	Genk	22,159	0,9%	25,000
5	Charleroi	11,392	-5,7%	22,000
6	Germinal Beerschot	8,932	18,9%	12,300
7	Gent	8,804	7,0%	12,407
8	STVV	7,626	2,5%	12,000
9	Lierse	7,619	3,5%	10,000
10	Cercle Brugge	6,552	10,2%	19,093
11	Zulte Waregem	6,176	4,5%	8,500
12	Sporting Lokeren	5,756	-1,6%	8,300
13	Brussels	5,629	17,1%	10,500
14	Westerlo	5,465	-2,9%	10,000
15	Roeselare	5,395	-2,3%	9,036
16	RAEC	5,382	162,2%	9,600
17	Mouscron	5,288	-3,2%	11,000
18	Beveren	4,971	14,6%	10,000

== See also ==
- 2006–07 in Belgian football
