= Jan Van Steenberghe =

Belgian footballer (born 1972)

Personal information
- Date of birth: 4 July 1972 (age 54)
- Place of birth: Lokeren, Belgium
- Position: Goalkeeper

Youth career
- 1985–1991: KSC Lokeren
- 1991–1994: Standaard Wetteren

Senior career*
Years	Team	Apps	(Gls)
1994–2000	Eendracht Aalst	44	(0)
2000–2002	R.A.A. Louviéroise	5	(0)
2002	R. Antwerp F.C.	0	(0)
2002–2003	R.A.A. Louviéroise	12	(0)
2003–2007	R.S.C. Anderlecht	13	(0)
2007–2008	Dender EH	3	(0)
Total		77	(0)
- * Club domestic league appearances and goals

Jan Van Steenberghe (Dutch pronunciation: [ˈjɑɱ vɑn ˈsteːmbɛrɣə]; born 4 July 1972) is a former Belgian football goalkeeper. He played most recently for F.C. Verbroedering Dender E.H., after being released from R.S.C. Anderlecht. His former clubs include Eendracht Aalst, R.A.A. Louviéroise and R.S.C. Anderlecht.

While at La Louvière he helped them win the 2002–03 Belgian Cup.

== Honours ==
=== Club ===
La Louvière

- Belgian Cup: 2003

Anderlecht

- Belgian First Division: 2004, 2006, 2007
- Belgian Super Cup: 2006
