= Thierry Siquet =

Belgian footballer

Personal information
- Date of birth: 18 October 1968 (age 58)
- Place of birth: Huy, Belgium
- Position: Defender

Team information
- Current team: Belgium U18 (Manager); Virton (head of youth)

Youth career
- 1976–1984: Union Huy
- 198–1986: Standard Liège

Senior career*
Years	Team	Apps	(Gls)
1986–1991	Standard Liège		
1991–1997	Cercle Brugge	141	(3)
1997–1999	Germinal Ekeren		
1999–2004	La Louvière		
2004–2006	Charleroi		

International career
	Belgium	0	(0)

Managerial career
- 2006–2007: Charleroi (assistant)
- 2007–2008: Charleroi
- 2009–2013: RE Bertrix
- 2012–2014: Belgium U15
- 2013–: Virton (technical director)
- 2014–2015: Belgium U16
- 2015–2020: Belgium U17
- 2020–2022: Belgium U18
- 2022-: Belgium U19
- * Club domestic league appearances and goals

Thierry Siquet (born 18 October 1968) is a Belgian football manager and former player who is the manager of Belgium U18 and the technical director of Virton football club.

A former defender, he helped La Louvière win the 2002–03 Belgian Cup. He is the uncle of footballer Hugo Siquet.

== Coaching career ==
=== Charleroi ===
After retiring as a player in January 2006, Siquet stayed at Royal Charleroi, where he was hired as an assistant manager to Jacky Mathijssen for the 2006–07 season and later to Philippe Vande Walle.

After Vande Walle resigned in December 2007, Siquet was appointed manager for the next two games. Despite losing them, he was confirmed as the manager for the rest of the season. During the second half of the season, the results improved and Charleroi finished in an 8th place. Siquet was then confirmed as manager for the 2008–09 season also. Twelve months later, on 15 December 2008 Siquet got fired. Siquet later spoke of a lack of confidence from the club, which kept him on board after his resignation until an agreement was reached with his successor John Collins.

=== RE Bertrix ===
On 17 March 2009, Siquet was appointed manager of Belgian Fourth Division club Royale Entente Bertrigeoise (RE Bertrix). Siquet won promotion to the Belgian Third Division in his first season with the club. In the 2010–11 season, he finished third with the club in the Belgian Third Division B, but because Bertrix hadnøt applied for a license for the Belgian Second Division, they were forced to stay in the third division for another season.

After that, things did not go as well for Siquet and Bertrix: in the 2011–12 season, the club could only narrowly avoid the final round for relegation, and in the following season ended with a relegation to the fourth division. Siquet and Bertrix then separated in April 2013.

=== National team and Virton ===
Siquet started working as a youth coach at the KBVB in 2012, where he coached the Belgium U15 national team until 2014. In 2014, he was promoted to manager of the U16 national team. From 2015 to 2020 he was the manager of Belgium U17.

In May 2013, Siquet also became the technical director of Virton's youth academy.

When Johan Walem became national coach of Cyprus in March 2020, Siquet was appointed manager for Belgium's U18 national team.
