= 2002–03 Belgian Cup =

Tournament details
- Country: Belgium

Final positions
- Champions: Louviéroise
- Runners-up: Sint-Truidense

Tournament statistics
- Matches played: 37

The 2002–03 Belgian Cup was the 48th season of the main knockout competition in Belgian association football, the Belgian Cup. For the first time the quarter-finals were played in two legs.

== Final rounds ==
The final phase started in the round of 32 when all clubs from the first division entered the competition (18 clubs plus 14 clubs from the qualifications). All rounds were played in one leg except for the quarter-finals and the semifinals (in two legs). The final game was played at the Heysel Stadium in Brussels and won by Louviéroise against Sint-Truidense.

=== Final ===
1 June 2003
16:00 CEST

La Louvière	3–1	Sint-Truiden
Ishiaku 27', 72'; Arts 35'	Report	Buvens 83'

King Baudouin Stadium, Brussels
Attendance: 32,000
Referee: Johan Verbist
