= Manasseh Ishiaku =

Nigerian footballer

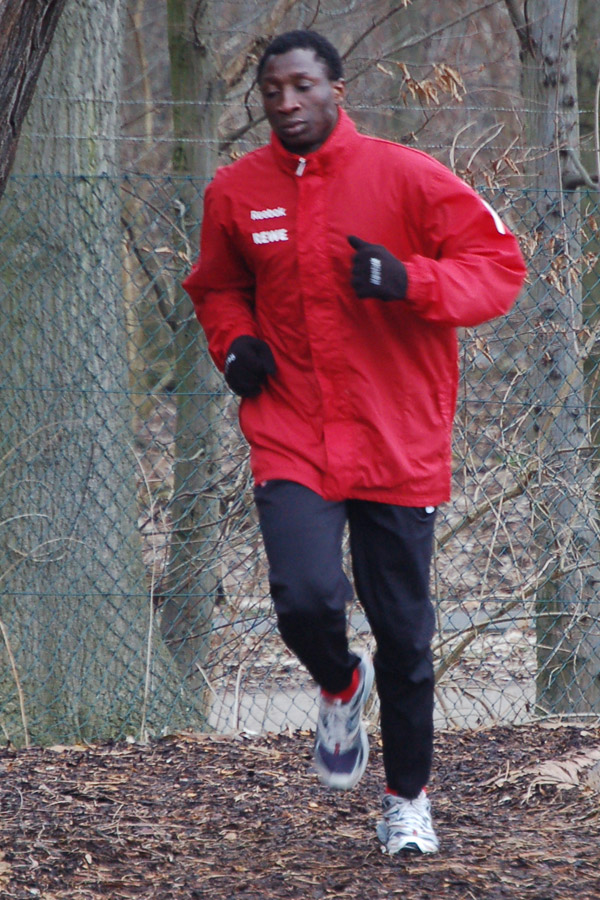
- Ishiaku training (2009)

Personal information
- Full name: Manasseh Ishiaku
- Date of birth: 9 January 1983 (age 43)
- Place of birth: Port Harcourt, Nigeria
- Height: 1.83 m (6 ft 0 in)
- Position: Striker

Youth career
- –1999: Shooting Stars
- 1999–2000: NSWIS

Senior career*
Years	Team	Apps	(Gls)
2000–2002	Roeselare	34	(4)
2002–2005	La Louvière	74	(18)
2005–2007	Club Brugge	52	(12)
2007–2008	MSV Duisburg	25	(10)
2008–2011	1. FC Köln	28	(1)
2011	→ Sint-Truiden (loan)	5	(0)
Total		213	(45)

International career
2007–2008	Nigeria	3	(1)
- * Club domestic league appearances and goals

Manasseh Ishiaku (born 9 January 1983) is a Nigerian former professional footballer who played as a striker.

While at La Louvière he helped them win the 2002–03 Belgian Cup, scoring twice in the final. Four years later he scored the winning goal in the final of the same competition, this time for Club Brugge.

== Honours ==
La Louvière

- Belgian Cup: 2002–03

Club Brugge

- Belgian Super Cup: 2005
- Belgian Cup: 2006–07
