= François Sterchele =

Belgian footballer (1982–2008)

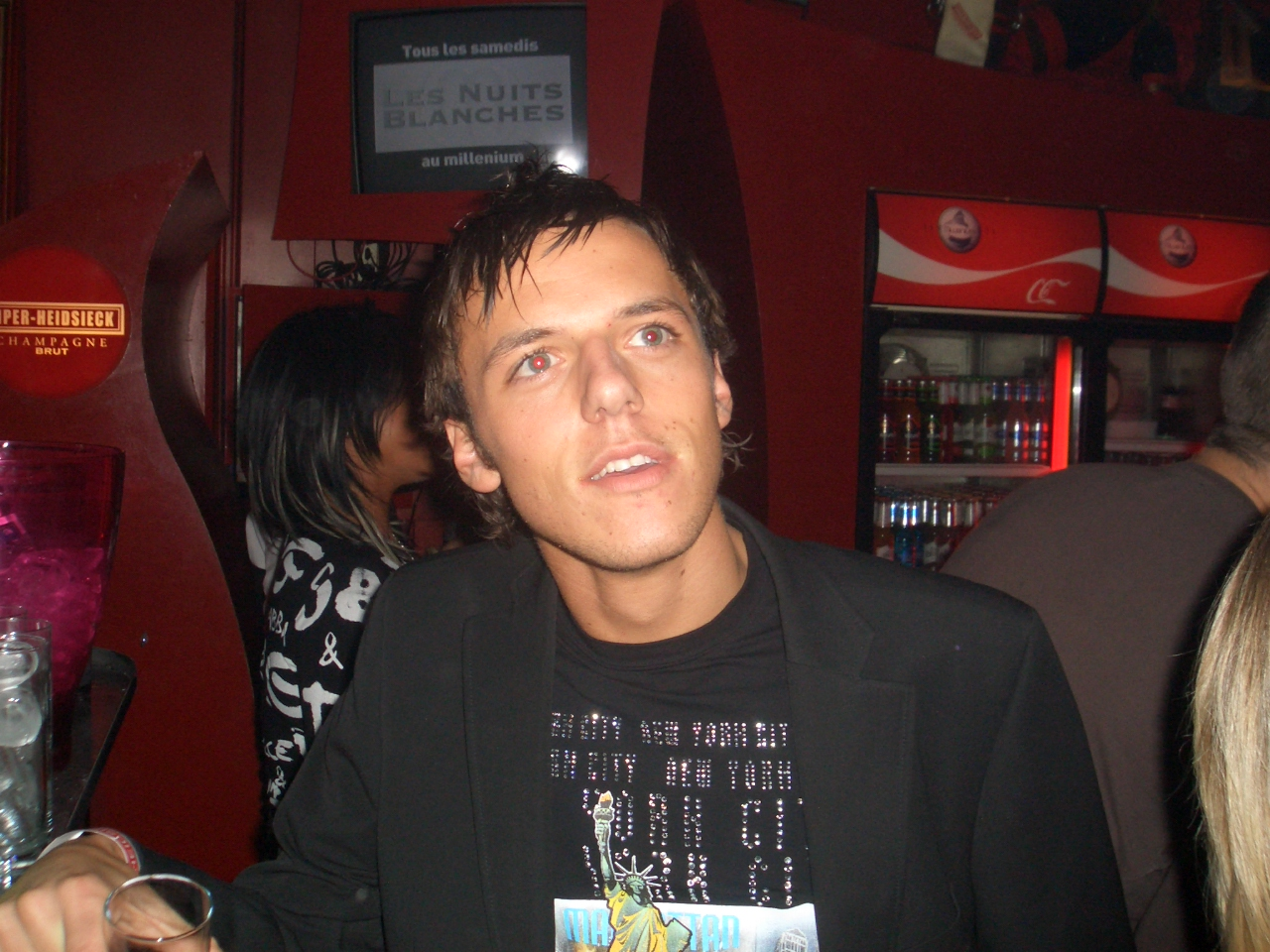
- Sterchele in 2004

Personal information
- Date of birth: 14 March 1982
- Place of birth: Liège, Belgium
- Date of death: 8 May 2008 (aged 26)
- Place of death: Vrasene, Beveren, Belgium
- Height: 1.85 m (6 ft 1 in)
- Position: Striker

Youth career
- –1992: FC Loncin
- 1992–2000: RFC Liège

Senior career*
Years	Team	Apps	(Gls)
2000–2001	RFC Liège		(11)
2001–2004 (Note: Statistics for the 2001–02 season are unknown.)	Union La Calamine	58+	(37+)
2004–2005	Oud-Heverlee Leuven	31	(32)
2005–2006	Charleroi	31	(9)
2006–2007	Germinal Beerschot	32	(21)
2007–2008	Club Brugge	31	(11)
Total		183+	(121+)

International career
2007	Belgium	4	(0)
- * Club domestic league appearances and goals

François Sterchele (14 March 1982 – 8 May 2008) was a Belgian professional footballer who played for Royal Charleroi, Germinal Beerschot and Club Brugge. The striker was the top scorer of the Jupiler League in 2006–07. Sterchele died in a single-person car accident on 8 May 2008.

== Club career ==
Sterchele started his career at FC Loncin, a small team from the Belgian Provincial Leagues in the province of Liège. At the age of ten, he moved to RFC Liège where he stayed for ten years before moving to R.F.C. Union La Calamine. After three seasons, he was signed by Oud-Heverlee Leuven, a team in the third division, where he scored 21 goals during the 2004–05 season, finishing second in the topscorers list. In the subsequent playoffs, he scored another eight goals which would help earn the team to promotion to the second tier.

As a result, Sterchele was able to secure a transfer to the top division in Belgian football, the Jupiler League, when he joined Charleroi, where he was trained by Jacky Mathijssen, who would become a considerable influence in his development as a footballer. After just one year, he went to Germinal Beerschot and became the league's top scorer.

On 19 July 2007, Sterchele returned to the tutorship of Mathijssen when he moved to Club Brugge; he scored two goals on his league début against Mons.

== International ==
Sterchele had four caps in six appearances for the Belgian national team, all earned during the 2007 Euro 2008 qualifiers. He made his debut away against Portugal, coming on as a substitute with 25 minutes remaining. He started the following match, again against Portugal, this time at home, and was substituted after an hour. He also played in both matches against Finland, coming on as a late substitute each time. He did not score any goals for the Red Devils.

== Death ==
In the early morning of 8 May 2008, Sterchele was killed instantly when he crashed his Porsche Cayman S into a tree.

The previous day, Sterchele had visited some friends in Antwerp and was supposed to meet with Jürgen Cavens and Vicenzo Verhoeven. While travelling home on the N49 between Antwerp and Knokke, at around 03:00 CEST on 8 May, Sterchele lost control of his Porsche while speeding and veered into a ditch before hitting a tree. No other vehicles were involved in the accident. Sterchele was pronounced dead at the scene.

== Tributes ==
Club Brugge, Sterchele's last club, decided to retire the number 23 in honor of their deceased striker. The fans of Club Brugge also started singing his name in the 23rd minute of every game their team plays. While playing against them in the Europa League, the fans of Birmingham City F.C. clapped to show their respect, and also carried the tribute out at their home ground, St. Andrews. Also there is the "Coppa Sterchele", each year two of his ex-teams play a friendly match to honor him.

A two-hour documentary on Sterchele was released in May 2025 by DAZN.

== Career statistics ==
Club	Season	League			Cups (Note: Belgian Cup)		Europe		Total	
Club	Season	Division	Apps	Goals	Apps	Goals	Apps	Goals	Apps	Goals
Oud-Heverlee Leuven	2004–05	Belgian Pro League	31	32	2	1	1 (Note: UEFA Intertoto Cup)	0	34	34
Charleroi	2005–06	Belgian Pro League	31	9	6	2	-		37	11
Germinal Beerschot	2006–07	Belgian Pro League	31	21	1	1	-		32	22
Club Brugge	2007–08	Belgian Pro League	31	11	1	0	2 (Note: UEFA Cup)	1	34	13
Career total			154	96	9	1	3	1	154	96

== Honours ==
Individual

- Belgian Pro League top scorer: 2006–07 (21 goals)
