= Michael Klukowski =

Soccer player (born 1981)

Mike Klukowski
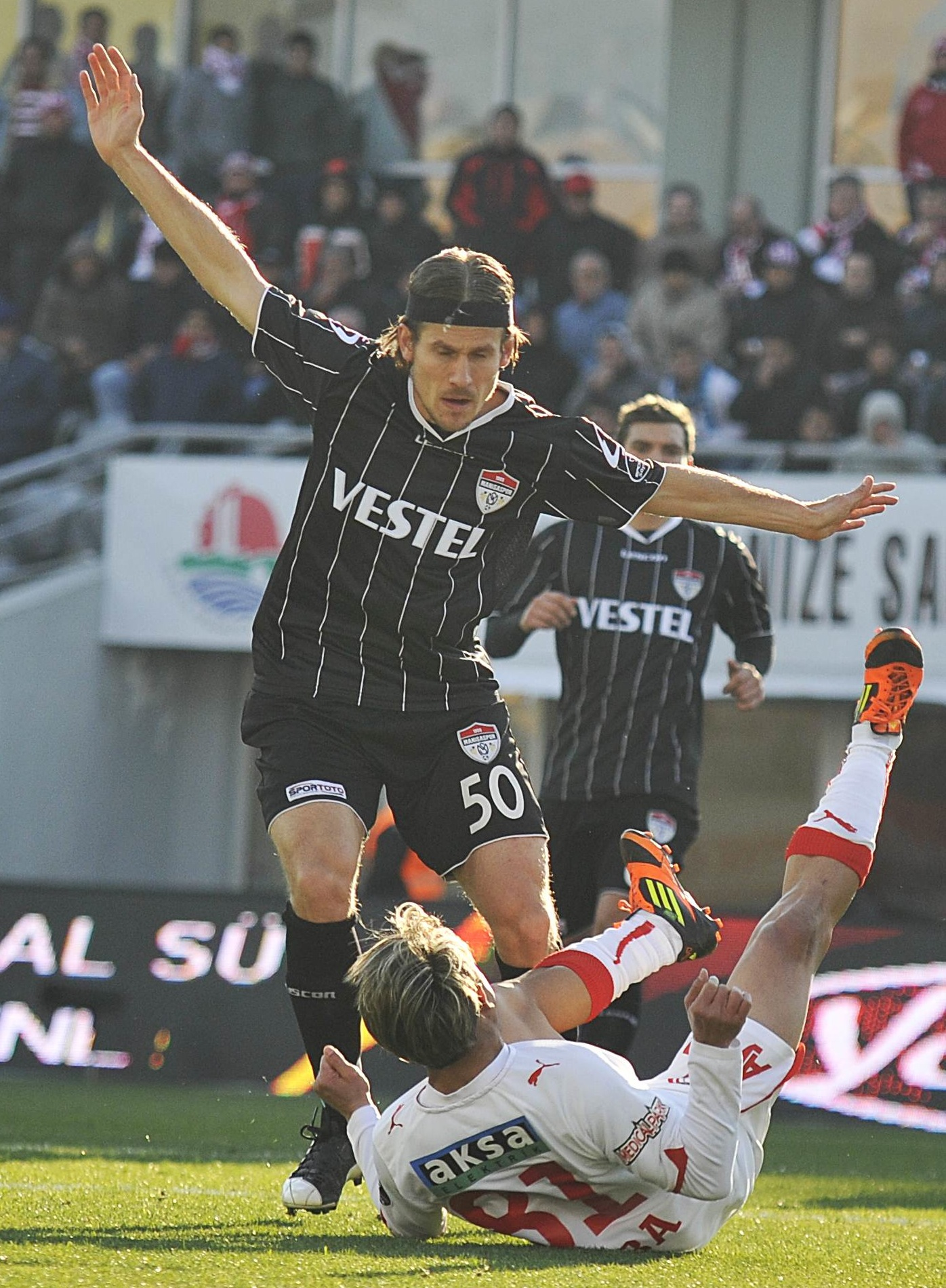
- Klukowski with Manisaspor, 2012

Personal information
- Full name: Michael Władysław Klukowski
- Date of birth: 27 May 1981 (age 45)
- Place of birth: Amstetten, Austria
- Height: 1.85 m (6 ft 1 in)
- Position: Left-back

Youth career
- 1997: Oshawa Kicks
- 1998: Scarborough Azzurri-Blues

Senior career*
Years	Team	Apps	(Gls)
1998–1999	Dijon	32	(9)
1999–2000	US Tourcoing	25	(12)
2000–2002	Lille B	30	(1)
2002–2005	La Louvière	90	(3)
2005–2010	Club Brugge	175	(1)
2010–2011	Ankaragücü	23	(1)
2011–2012	Manisaspor	26	(0)
2012–2013	APOEL	16	(1)
Total		417	(28)

International career
2001	Canada U20	6	(0)
2003	Canada U23	1	(0)
2003–2012	Canada	36	(0)
- * Club domestic league appearances and goals

Michael Władysław Klukowski (Polish pronunciation: [kluˈkɔfskʲi]; born 27 May 1981) is a former soccer player who played as a left-back and made 36 appearances for the Canada national team.

== Club career ==
Klukowski was born in Amstetten, Austria. He began his career in Canada playing for the Oshawa Kicks and Scarborough Azzurri-Blues, before travelling across the Atlantic to join Dijon FCO in 1999. A move to Tourcoing FC followed the next year before his performances caught the attention of Ligue 1 outfit Lille OSC, whom he joined in 2001. He only played for their reserve team, however, so his time at the Stade Grimonprez-Jooris was equally brief. He finally found his feet at La Louvière, making 72 league appearances over the next two-and-a-half seasons. While at La Louvière, he helped them win the 2002–03 Belgian Cup.

=== Club Brugge ===
At La Louvière, Klukowski attracted interest from Club Brugge, who signed him in a deal thought to be worth €900,000 during the winter break in January 2005. He initially had to bide his time at the Jan Breydel Stadium, but did make six appearances towards the end of the campaign as Club Brugge sealed the title. Klukowski was the number one left back for five seasons with Brugge. He replaced Peter Van Der Heyden, who suffered a knee injury, during the last season with Trond Sollied. Klukowski left Brugge with 178 official games, including 26 European appearances and two Belgian Supercup Final appearances.

=== Ankaragücü ===
In mid-August 2010, Klukowski moved to Süper Lig club Ankaragücü for an estimated value of €750,000 while signing a three-year deal. He made his debut for the club in a 1–1 home draw against Kayserispor on 27 August 2010. Klukowski scored his first goal in Turkey on 4 December 2010 in a 1–1 home draw against Sivasspor, scoring the opening goal in the 11th minute at the Ankara 19 Mayıs Stadium until Erman Kılıç tied it up with a goal in the 56th. In early April 2011, it was announced that Klukowski was leaving Ankaragücü over unpaid wages. The club was in the news earlier that year when former England international Darius Vassell was removed from his hotel room because the club failed to pay for his accommodation.

=== Manisaspor ===
In early June prior to the 2011 CONCACAF Gold Cup, it was announced that Klukowski had signed for Manisaspor for the upcoming season. Canadian international Josh Simpson, Manisaspor's leading goal scorer from the 2010–11 season, played a major factor in Klukowski's decision to sign with the Western Turkish club. Klukowski made his debut for Manisaspor on 10 September in a 1–1 draw against Trabzonspor.

=== APOEL ===
On 20 July 2012, Klukowski signed a two-year contract with Cypriot side APOEL. At the end of the season, he was crowned champion after winning the 2012–13 Cypriot First Division with APOEL.

== International career ==
After representing Canada at the 2001 FIFA World Youth Championship in Argentina, Klukowski made the step up to the senior side in March 2003. He made his debut for Canada in a February 2003 friendly match against Libya. He has represented Canada in ten FIFA World Cup qualification matches. As of 13 June 2012, he has earned a total of 36 caps, scoring no goals.

He managed to make the All-Tournament team of the 2009 CONCACAF Gold Cup along with fellow Canadian Julian de Guzman.

== Personal life ==
Born to Polish parents who had stopped in Austria while on their way to Canada, Klukowski is of Polish descent and holds Polish citizenship. Klukowski's son, Antoni, is also a soccer player who plays in Poland for Widzew Łódź.

== Honours ==
La Louvière

- Belgian Cup: 2002–03

Club Brugge

- Belgian Super Cup: 2005
- Belgian Cup: 2006–07

Canada

- CONCACAF Gold Cup All-Tournament Team: 2009
