= Didier Ernst =

Belgian footballer (born 1971)

Personal information
- Date of birth: 15 September 1971 (age 55)
- Place of birth: Dison, Belgium
- Height: 1.76 m (5 ft 9 in)
- Position: Defender

Senior career*
Years	Team	Apps	(Gls)
1991–2002	Standard Liège	238	(5)
1993	→FC Boom (on loan)	2	(0)
2002–2003	Louvierose	29	(1)
2003–2004	Brussels	32	(2)
2004–2005	Eupen	30	(4)
2005–2007	Vervierois	50	(1)
2007–2008	Comblain Sport	3	(0)
2008–2009	Spa FC	0	(0)
Total		384	(11)

International career
1999	Belgium	1	(0)

Managerial career
- 2010–2011: Verviers
- 2011–2012: Calamine
- 2012–: Comblain
- * Club domestic league appearances and goals

Didier Ernst (born 15 September 1971) is a Belgian former footballer who played as a defender.

While at La Louvière he helped them win the 2002–03 Belgian Cup.
