= Guy Mangelschots =

Belgian football manager

Personal information
- Date of birth: 8 April 1941 (age 85)
- Place of birth: Hasselt, Belgium

Managerial career
- Years: Team
- 1980–1981: Patro Eisden
- 1982–1986: Hoeselt VV
- 1986–1990: Sint-Truiden
- 1990–1991: Racing Mechelen
- 1991–1992: Patro Eisden
- 1993–1996: Sint-Truiden
- 1996–2012: Sint-Truiden (technical director)
- 1997: → Sint-Truiden (caretaker)
- 2005: → Sint-Truiden (caretaker)

Guy Mangelschots (born 8 April 1941) is a Belgian football manager.
