= Ariël Jacobs =

Belgian football manager and former player

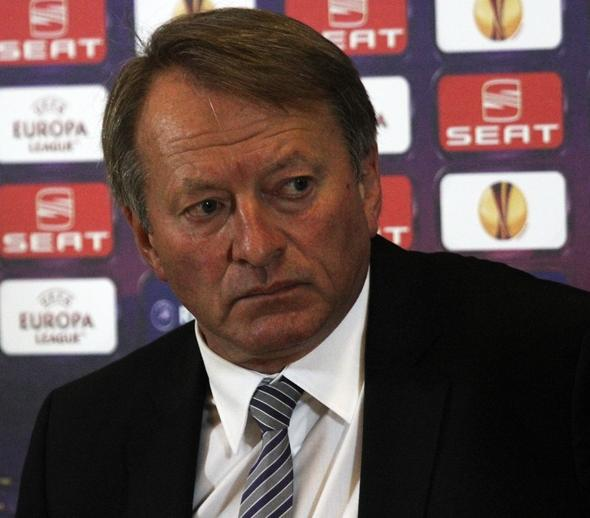
- With Anderlecht in 2011

Personal information
- Date of birth: 25 July 1953 (age 73)
- Place of birth: Vilvoorde, Flemish Brabant, Belgium
- Position: Defender

Team information
- Current team: Oud-Heverlee Leuven (Director of Football)

Senior career*
Years	Team	Apps	(Gls)
1965–1970	Diegem Sport		
1970–1973	Racing White		
1973–1979	Diegem Sport		
1979–1980	Halle		
1980–1983	Diegem Sport		
1983–1984	Diest		
1984–1987	Diegem Sport		

Managerial career
- 1984–1987: Diegem Sport
- 1989–1998: Belgium U21
- 1998–2001: Molenbeek
- 2001–2004: La Louvière
- 2006: Lokeren
- 2007: Mouscron
- 2007–2012: Anderlecht
- 2012–2013: Copenhagen
- 2013–2014: Valenciennes
- * Club domestic league appearances and goals

Ariël Jacobs (Flemish pronunciation: [ˈaːrijɛl ˈjaːkɔps]; born 25 July 1953) is a Belgian football manager and former player who most recently managed Ligue 1 side Valenciennes FC and is currently employed as Director of Football at Oud-Heverlee Leuven.

== Managerial career ==
While at La Louvière he led them to victory in the 2002–03 Belgian Cup.

Jacobs became new manager of FC Copenhagen in June 2012 following Carsten V. Jensen's resignation. His first season as manager of the club was a success and he led the club to the Danish Superliga-title in the 2012–13 season. On 21 August 2013, he was sacked as manager of FC Copenhagen as he failed to win in his first five games in the league.

On 14 October 2013, Jacobs was appointed manager of Valenciennes FC. He failed to secure the team from relegation following the 2013–14 Ligue 1 and he therefore left the club in July 2014.

== Honours ==
=== Manager ===
La Louvière

- Belgian Cup: 2002–03

Anderlecht

- Belgian First Division: 2009–10, 2011–12
- Belgian Cup: 2007–08
- Belgian Super Cup: 2007, 2010

Copenhagen

- Danish Superliga: 2012-2013

Individual

- Belgian Professional Manager of the Year: 2009–10
- Guy Thys Award: 2010–11
