= Désiré Mbonabucya =

Rwandan footballer

Personal information
- Date of birth: 25 February 1977 (age 49)
- Place of birth: Kigali, Rwanda
- Height: 1.77 m (5 ft 10 in)
- Position: Forward

Senior career*
Years	Team	Apps	(Gls)
–1995	Rayon Sport		
1995–1997	K.V. Mechelen	39	(11)
1997–2000	Gaziantepspor	70	(23)
2000–2007	Sint-Truiden	140	(57)
2004–2005	→ Beringen-Heusden-Zolder (loan)	9	(2)
2007–2008	KVK Tienen	1	(0)

International career
2000–2005	Rwanda	30	(0)

Managerial career
- 2009–present: US Albert Schaerbeek (Youth head coach)
- * Club domestic league appearances and goals

Désiré Mbonabucya (born 25 February 1977) is a Rwandan former professional footballer who played as a forward.

== Club career ==
Mbonabucya was born in Kigali, Rwanda. He was considered a valuable goalscorer for Sint-Truiden during his time at the club. After an injury, Mbonabucya moved to KVK Tienen. On 20 February 2009, he signed for US Albert in Schaerbeek. and eighteen months contract.

== International career ==
Along with teammate Claude Kalisa, Mbonabucya formed the backbone of the Rwandan national team that participated in the 2004 African Nations Cup.

== Coaching career ==
Mbonabucya began his coaching career on 20 February 2009 as youth head coach for US Albert in Schaerbaek.
