= Claude Kalisa =

Rwandan footballer

Personal information
- Date of birth: 6 June 1977 (age 49)
- Place of birth: Muyira
- Position: Defender

Senior career*
Years	Team	Apps	(Gls)
1996–1997	Rayon Sports Nyanza		
1998–1999	Yanbian Aodong		
1999–2001	Rayon Sports Nyanza		
2001–2006	K. Sint-Truidense V.V.	84	(7)

International career
1995–2004	Rwanda	15	(0)
- * Club domestic league appearances and goals

Claude Kalisa (born 6 June 1977)) is a Rwandan former professional football defender. Along with teammate Désiré Mbonabucya, Kalisa formed the backbone of the Rwandan national team that participated in the 2004 African Nations Cup.

== Career ==
Kalisa began playing professional football in China with Yanbian Century, and spent the last six seasons of his career in Belgium with K. Sint-Truidense V.V. He retired due to a knee injury in 2007.

== Personal ==
Kalisa's father was killed during the Civil War in his home country of Rwanda.

== Clubs ==
- 1996–1997: (Rwanda) Rayon Sport
- 1998–1999: (China) Yanbian Century
- 1999–2001: (Rwanda) Rayon Sport
- 2001–2007: (Belgium) Sint-Truiden
