= Guy Dardenne =

Belgian footballer

Personal information
- Full name: Guy Dardenne
- Date of birth: 19 October 1954 (age 72)
- Place of birth: Beauraing, Belgium
- Height: 1.80 m (5 ft 11 in)
- Position: Midfielder

Senior career*
Years	Team	Apps	(Gls)
1973–1976	Standard Liège	31	(1)
1976–1979	R.A.A. La Louvière	98	(32)
1979–1980	SC Lokeren	31	(4)
1980–1981	RWD Molenbeek	33	(7)
1981–1984	Club Brugge	88	(17)
1984–1986	Standard Liège	57	(11)
1986–1987	RFC Seraing	34	(8)
1987–1989	Royal Francs Borains	60	(19)
1989–1991	UR Namur		
1991–1994	RJ Rochefortoise FC		
Total		432	(99)

International career
1977–1980	Belgium	11	(0)
- * Club domestic league appearances and goals

Guy Dardenne (born 19 October 1954 in Beauraing) is a retired Belgian footballer, who played as both a midfielder or forward.

During his career he played for R. Standard de Liège, R.A.A. Louviéroise, Sporting Lokeren, R.W.D. Molenbeek and Club Brugge KV He earned 11 caps for the Belgium national football team, and participated in UEFA Euro 1980.

== Honours ==
=== Club ===
Standard Liège

- Belgian League Cup: 1975

=== International ===
Belgium

- UEFA European Championship: 1980 (runners-up)
- Belgian Sports Merit Award: 1980
