= Kevin Vandenbergh =

Belgian footballer

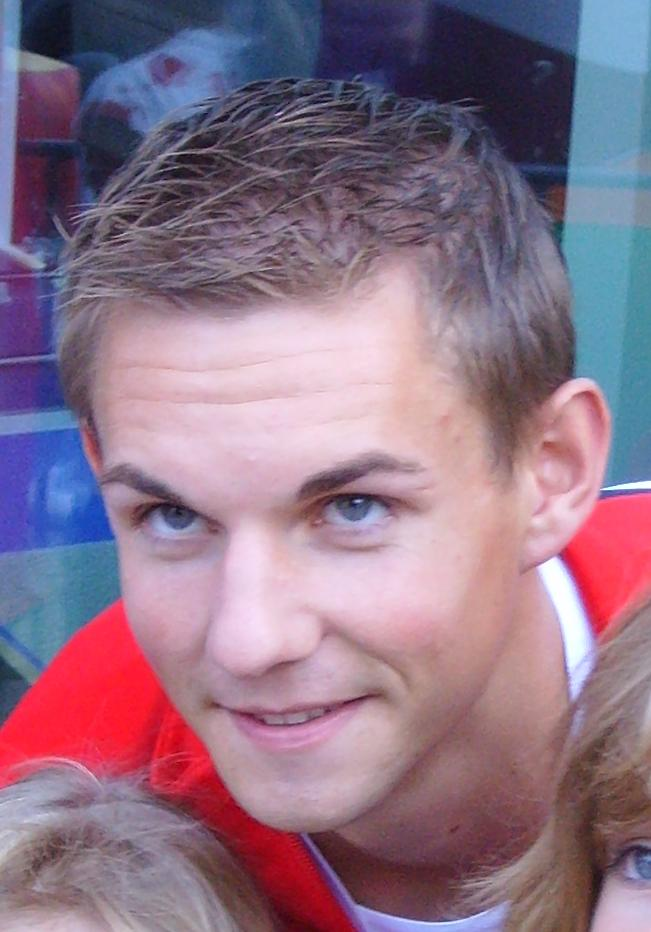

Personal information
- Full name: Kevin Vandenbergh
- Date of birth: 16 May 1983 (age 43)
- Place of birth: Bonheiden, Belgium
- Height: 1.79 m (5 ft 10 in)
- Position: Forward

Team information
- Current team: Ramsel

Youth career
- Westerlo

Senior career*
Years	Team	Apps	(Gls)
1999–2002	Westerlo	43	(14)
2002–2007	Genk	138	(66)
2007–2010	Utrecht	22	(3)
2008	→ Germinal Beerschot (loan)	24	(6)
2010–2011	Eupen	28	(9)
2011–2012	Mechelen	27	(1)
2012–2015	Westerlo	37	(11)
2015–2016	Dessel Sport	20	(1)
2016–2020	Aarschot	107	(98)
2020–	Ramsel		

International career
2003–2005	Belgium U21	14	(12)
2005–2007	Belgium	13	(3)
- * Club domestic league appearances and goals as of 28 December 2015

Kevin Vandenbergh (Dutch pronunciation: [ˈkɛvɪɱ vɑndə(m)ˈbɛr(ə)x]; born 16 May 1983) is a Belgian former professional footballer who plays as a forward for Ramsel in the Belgian Provincial Leagues. His father, Erwin Vandenbergh, was one of the most prolific strikers in the 1980s for Belgium.

He also earned some caps with Belgium and the Belgian U21 team, with his debut in the national side in 2004. Vandenbergh scored a hat-trick in Belgium's 3–2 win against Ukraine in the round of 16 of 2006 U21 European Football Championship.

== Career ==
Vandenbergh was born in Bonheiden. He played for K.V.C. Westerlo until 2002, then he went to K.R.C. Genk. He proved to be an exceptional goal-scorer like his father Erwin Vandenbergh, 66 goals in overall 138 appearances in the four seasons he was in Fenix Stadion. After a successful 2006–07 season for his club where Genk came in second place, he joined Dutch Eredivisie side Utrecht. This was due to a falling-out with his manager Hugo Broos. Vandenbergh could not fit in with Broos' plans, eventually his place in the starting XI replaced by Goran Ljubojevic.

== Career statistics ==
Scores and results list Belgium's goal tally first, score column indicates score after each Vandenbergh goal.

List of international goals scored by Kevin Vandenbergh
No.	Date	Venue	Opponent	Score	Result	Competition
1	7 September 2005	Olympisch Stadion, Antwerp, Belgium	San Marino	5–0	8–0	2006 FIFA World Cup qualification
2	1 March 2006	Stade Josy Barthel, Luxembourg, Luxembourg	Luxembourg	1–0	2–0	Friendly abandoned after 63 minutes due to excessive snow
3	11 October 2006	Constant Vanden Stock Stadium, Brussels, Belgium	Azerbaijan	2–0	3–0	UEFA Euro 2008 qualifying
