= Henk Houwaart =

Dutch footballer and manager

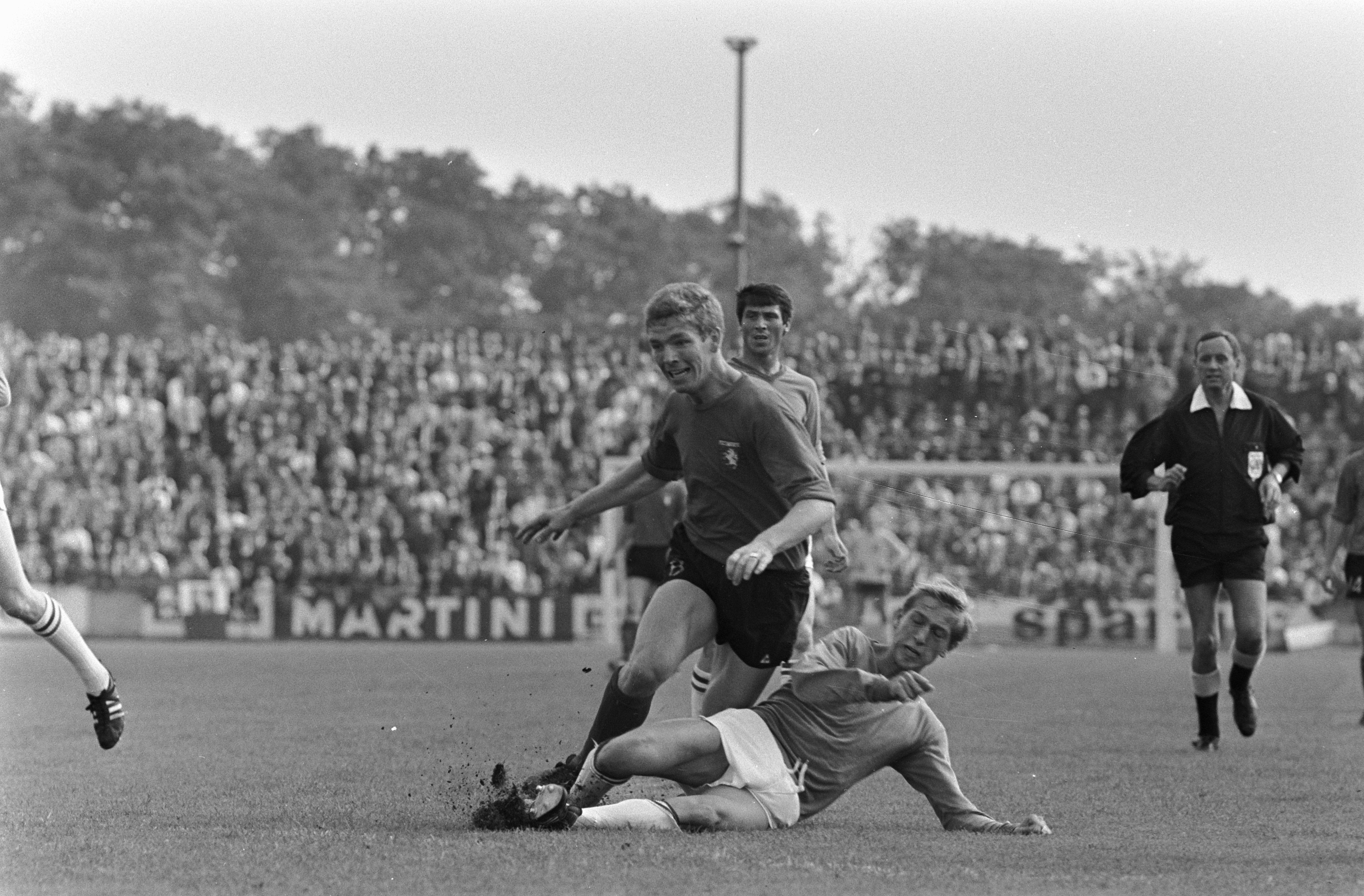

Personal information
- Date of birth: August 31, 1945 (age 81)
- Place of birth: The Hague, Netherlands
- Position: Midfielder

Youth career
- 1960-1962: Oranjeplein

Senior career*
Years	Team	Apps	(Gls)
1966–1967	ADO	88	(34)
1967	Golden Gate Gales	12	(9)
1967–1969	Twente	34	(7)
1969–1972	Daring Molenbeek	80	(11)
1972–1976	Club Brugge	89	(15)
1975–1976	FC Antwerp	3	(0)

International career
1969	Netherlands	1	(0)

Managerial career
- 1977–1978: Roeselare
- 1978–1979: Eendracht Aalst
- 1979–1983: Kortrijk
- 1983–1984: Cercle Brugge
- 1984–1989: Club Brugge
- 1989–1990: Kortrijk
- 1990–1991: Xanthi
- 1991–1993: Cercle Brugge
- 1994: Waregem
- 1994–2000: Harelbeke
- 2000: AA Gent
- 2000–2001: Omonia Nicosia
- 2002–2003: FC Antwerp
- 2003–2004: AEL Limassol
- 2004–2005: Omonia Nicosia
- 2006–2007: Sint-Truiden
- 2007: Aris Limassol
- * Club domestic league appearances and goals

Henk Houwaart (born August 31, 1945) is a Dutch football manager and a former football player.

== Playing career ==
Born in the Hague, Houwaart began his career in 1963 as a footballer playing for ADO Den Haag until 1967, when he left the club to play for FC Twente. After being selected once for the Dutch national team, he continued his career in 1969 in Belgium to play for Club Brugge and in his first season his team won the Belgian Cup and the championship in 1973. He was transferred to Antwerp in 1975 but six months later, he sustained an injury in a UEFA Cup match against Śląsk Wrocław that ended his career.

== Coaching career ==
However, he did not stop his football career and began to work as a trainer. Beginning his career as a trainer of Roeselare in 1977, the following season he became trainer of Eendracht Aalst. KV Kortrijk was his next club in 1979 and after finishing second in Belgian Second Division his team promoted to First Division.

In 1983, he moved to Cercle Brugge; however, Houwaart's aim was to become trainer of Club Brugge and one year later he moved there. He won his first trophies with this club, the Belgian Cup in 1986 and the Belgian Supercup the same year. He also won his first Championship as a coach in the 1987–88 season and the same season his team played in UEFA Cup and reached the semi-finals, when they were eliminated by RCD Espanyol in extra time.

He was fired in 1989 after bad results and he returned to his former club KV Kortrijk. He then moved to Greece to be the coach of Xanthi. After one year in Greece, he returned to Belgium and returned for two years to Cercle Brugge until 1993. His next team was Harelbeke, and he helped them to promote to the first division. He stayed there six years, from 1994 until 2000. After six years coaching Harelbeke, he went to Gent, but few months after, he was fired after a home defeat of the team in UEFA Cup by Ajax.

For the second time in his career he left Belgium, this time he moved to Cyprus in November 2000 and became coach of Omonia Nicosia. Despite that Omonia was the most successful team in Cyprus, they had not won the Cypriot First Division in eight years. Omonia were seven points behind Anorthosis Famagusta, who were champions the previous four years and another year seemed lost for Omonia. After Houwaart's departure, Omonia performance changed rapidly and they won the championship after 8 years and a few months later they won the Cyprus Super Cup. After a bad beginning in the 2001–02 season, Houwaart quit as coach and went back to Belgium and to Royal Antwerp for the remaining season. He coached Sporting West Ingelmunster-Harelbeke in 2002–03.

He moved to Cyprus again, this time for AEL Limassol during the middle of the season 2003–04. Since the day he began coaching AEL Limassol, his team was unbeaten and reached the Cypriot Cup final. The unbeaten record ended in that final against AEK Larnaca, when his team lost 2–1. Six months later, he returned to his first Cypriot team, AC Omonia and won the Cypriot Cup after beating Digenis Morphou in the final 2–0. A few months later, they won the Cyprus Super Cup again. In the Super Cup, Omonia beat Anorthosis Famagusta 5–4 on penal ties after a 2–2 result. The 2005–06, Omonia was contenter for the Championship title, however the team performed badly and he resigned again from Omonia. Since then, he moved to Sint-Truidense V.V. in February 2006, where he saved them from relegation. He later became Head Coach from Belgian lower division team Knokke but left them for Aris Limassol where he only had a two-month stint. He then coached Wetteren and Zwevezele in the Belgian lower leagues.

== Personal life ==
Houwaart lives with his wife Dorien in Knesselare. In 2008, his son Henk jr. ("Henkie") who had played for Belgian clubs Club Brugge, Beerschot and Francs Borains died of cancer aged 42.

He suffered a brain hemorrhage in 2024.
