= Peter Voets =

Belgian footballer

Personal information
- Date of birth: 17 September 1968 (age 58)
- Place of birth: Sint-Truiden, Belgium
- Height: 1.78 m (5 ft 10 in)
- Position: Defender

Senior career*
Years	Team	Apps	(Gls)
1989–1993	K.S.C. Hasselt		
1993–2004	Sint-Truiden		

Managerial career
- 2005: Sint-Truiden
- 2006: Sint-Truiden
- 2007: Sint-Truiden
- 2007: Sint-Truiden (assistant)
- 2007–2008: Sint-Truiden
- 2011: Sint-Truiden (assistant)
- * Club domestic league appearances and goals

Peter Voets (born 17 September 1968) is a Belgian football player and manager who played as a defender.
