= Čedomir Janevski =

Macedonian footballer (born 1961)

Čedomir Janevski Чедомир Јаневски
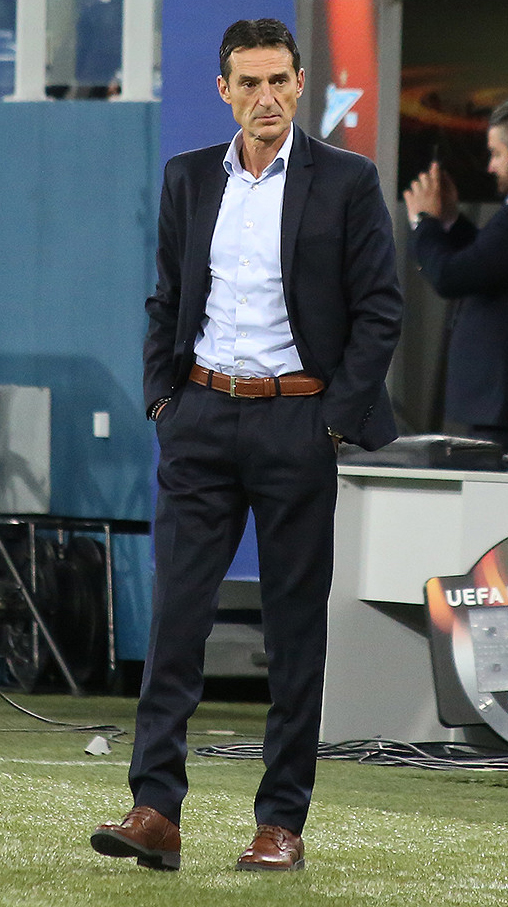

Personal information
- Date of birth: 3 July 1961 (age 65)
- Place of birth: Skopje, SR Macedonia
- Position: Defender

Team information
- Current team: Krasava ENY (manager)

Senior career*
| Years | Team | Apps | (Gls) |
| 1980–1982 | FK Skopje | | |
| 1982–1989 | Vardar | 160 | (9) |
| 1989–1991 | Club Brugge | 23 | (0) |
| 1991–1995 | Charleroi | 87 | (4) |
| 1995–1996 | İstanbulspor | 2 | (0) |
| 1996–1997 | Lokeren | 31 | (0) |
| 1998–1999 | Daring Club Blankenberge | | |

International career
| 1987 | Yugoslavia | 2 | (0) |
| 1993–1995 | Macedonia | 5 | (1) |

Managerial career
- 1998–2000: Daring Club Blankenberge
- 2000–2005: Club Brugge (youth team)
- 2005–2007: Olympiacos (assistant)
- 2007: Club Brugge
- 2007–2008: Gent (assistant)
- 2008: Al-Shaab
- 2008–2009: Red Star Belgrade
- 2009–2011: Enosis Neon Paralimni
- 2011–2012: Ethnikos Achna
- 2012–2013: Macedonia
- 2013–2014: Mons
- 2015–2016: Mouscron-Péruwelz
- 2016–2017: Waasland-Beveren
- 2017–2018: FK Vardar
- 2018–2019: Ismaily
- 2019–2020: Enosis Neon Paralimni
- 2021: Olympiakos Nicosia
- 2021–2022: South Africa (assistant)
- 2022–2023: AEL Limassol
- 2024–2025: Nea Salamis Famagusta FC
- 2025–: Krasava ENY
- * Club domestic league appearances and goals

Čedomir "Čede" Janevski (Macedonian: Чедомир "Чеде" Јаневски, born 3 July 1961) is a Macedonian professional football manager and former player. He played internationally for both Yugoslavia and Macedonia.

== Club career ==
During Janevski's two-year stint at Club Brugge, the team where he would later become youth trainer, assistant manager and eventually manager, he won both the League in 1990 and the Belgian Cup in 1991. He never managed a secure place in the starting line-up, playing 35 matches and scoring once over the course of two years.

== International career ==
Janevski made his senior debut for Yugoslavia in an August 1987 friendly match against the Soviet Union and has earned a total of two caps. He then made another debut for Macedonia in an October 1993 friendly against Slovenia and has earned a further five caps. His final international was a June 1995 European Championship qualification match against Belgium in Skopje.

== Career statistics ==
=== International ===
Scores and results list Macedonia's goal tally first, score column indicates score after each Janevski goal.

List of international goals scored by Čedomir Janevski
| No. | Date | Venue | Opponent | Score | Result | Competition |
|---|---|---|---|---|---|---|
| 1 | 13 October 1993 | Stanko Mlakar Stadium, Kranj, Slovenia | Slovenia | 3–1 | 4–1 | Friendly |

== Managerial statistics ==
As of match played 4 February 2024

Managerial record by team and tenure
| Team | Nat | From | To | Record | | | | | | | |
| Team | Nat | From | To | G | W | D | L | GF | GA | GD | Win % |
|---|---|---|---|---|---|---|---|---|---|---|---|
| Club Brugge | (Belgium) | 19 January 2007 | 30 June 2007 | 20 | 8 | 5 | 7 | 30 | 25 | +5 | 40.00 |
| Al-Shaab | (United Arab Emirates) | 26 July 2008 | 10 September 2008 | 0 | 0 | 0 | 0 | 0 | 0 | +0 | — |
| Red Star Belgrade | (Serbia) | 10 September 2008 | 5 May 2009 | 26 | 14 | 6 | 6 | 46 | 23 | +23 | 53.85 |
| Enosis Neon Paralimni | (Cyprus) | 1 June 2009 | 10 January 2011 | 48 | 14 | 14 | 20 | 51 | 59 | −8 | 29.17 |
| Ethnikos Achna | (Cyprus) | 10 October 2011 | 27 February 2012 | 17 | 5 | 5 | 7 | 12 | 15 | −3 | 29.41 |
| North Macedonia | (North Macedonia) | 21 August 2012 | 27 September 2013 | 14 | 5 | 1 | 8 | 15 | 19 | −4 | 35.71 |
| Mons | (Belgium) | 28 September 2013 | 30 June 2014 | 25 | 6 | 3 | 16 | 24 | 43 | −19 | 24.00 |
| Mouscron-Péruwelz | (Belgium) | 1 July 2015 | 19 January 2016 | 25 | 7 | 6 | 12 | 32 | 39 | −7 | 28.00 |
| Waasland-Beveren | (Belgium) | 7 November 2016 | 30 June 2017 | 27 | 9 | 5 | 13 | 32 | 40 | −8 | 33.33 |
| FK Vardar | (North Macedonia) | 16 August 2017 | 16 April 2018 | 33 | 15 | 8 | 10 | 47 | 43 | +4 | 45.45 |
| Ismaily | (Egypt) | 17 December 2018 | 26 April 2019 | 22 | 6 | 8 | 8 | 21 | 26 | −5 | 27.27 |
| Enosis Neon Paralimni | (Cyprus) | 20 January 2020 | 31 May 2020 | 8 | 3 | 4 | 1 | 10 | 8 | +2 | 37.50 |
| Olympiakos Nicosia | (Cyprus) | 28 January 2021 | 31 May 2021 | 20 | 10 | 3 | 7 | 28 | 23 | +5 | 50.00 |
| AEL Limassol | (Cyprus) | 17 September 2022 | 14 April 2023 | 31 | 14 | 7 | 10 | 32 | 29 | +3 | 45.16 |
| Career total | | | | 316 | 116 | 75 | 125 | 380 | 392 | −12 | 36.71 |

== Honours ==
=== Player ===
Club Brugge

- Belgian First Division: 1989–90
- Belgian Cup: 1990–91

=== Manager ===
Olympiacos (as assistant manager)

- Super League Greece: 2005–06
- Greek Cup: 2005–06

Club Brugge

- Belgian Cup: 2006–07
