= Thomas Caers =

Belgian footballer (born 1973)

Thomas Caers (born 14 January 1973) is a Belgian football manager and former player. He was the manager of Sint-Truiden from February 2006 to November 2006, when he resigned.

Caers played for MVV Maastricht in the Dutch Eerste Divisie and K.A.A. Gent and Sint-Truiden in the Belgian First Division.

== Playing career ==
- 1977–1990 KFC Tongerlo
- 1990–1997 KVC Westerlo
- 1997–1999 Gent
- 1999-02/2002 MVV Maastricht
- 02/2002–10/2004 Sint-Truidense

== Managerial career ==
- 02/2006–11/2006 Sint-Truidense
