= Jacky Mathijssen =

Belgian football manager (born 1963)

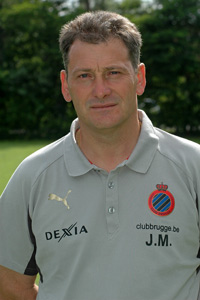
- Mathijssen with Club Brugge

Personal information
- Date of birth: 20 July 1963 (age 63)
- Place of birth: Dilsen-Stokkem, Belgium
- Position: Goalkeeper

Senior career*
Years	Team	Apps	(Gls)
1973–1982	VVH Dilsen		
1982–1985	K.F.C. Winterslag		
1985–1990	Charleroi	88	(0)
1990–1993	Genk	57	(0)
1993–2000	K.F.C. Lommel S.K.	162	(0)
2000–2001	Sint-Truiden	1	(0)

Managerial career
- 2001–2004: Sint-Truiden
- 2004–2007: Charleroi
- 2007–2009: Club Brugge
- 2009–2010: Lokeren
- 2010: Charleroi
- 2010–2012: Germinal Beerschot
- 2013: Beerschot
- 2013–2014: Fostiras
- 2015: OH Leuven
- 2016–2017: Westerlo
- 2017: AEL
- 2018–2020: Belgium U19
- 2020–2023: Belgium U21
- * Club domestic league appearances and goals

Jacky Mathijssen (Dutch pronunciation: [ˈdʑɛki mɑˈtɛisə(n)]; born 20 July 1963) is a Belgian football coach and former player. Following his playing career as a goalkeeper, he transitioned into coaching. In his most recent managerial role, Mathijssen was in charge of the Belgium U21 squad.

== Managerial statistics ==
As of 19 November 2019

Club	From	To	Record				
Club	From	To	G	W	D	L	Win%
Sint-Truiden	1 July 2001	26 April 2004	41	16	10	15	39.02
Charleroi	26 April 2004	30 June 2007	75	31	25	19	41.33
Club Brugge	1 July 2007	30 June 2009	78	40	15	23	51.28
Lokeren	25 October 2009	25 January 2010	12	2	1	9	16.66
Charleroi	1 July 2010	20 September 2010	7	1	2	4	14.28
Germinal Beerschot	3 December 2010	26 March 2012	55	15	19	21	27.27
Beerschot	24 January 2013	22 April 2013	11	2	2	7	18.18
Fostiras	10 August 2013	19 July 2014	43	16	11	16	37.20
OH Leuven	1 January 2015	24 November 2015	36	15	8	13	41.66
Westerlo	14 September 2016	21 June 2017	25	5	7	13	20.00
AEL	14 September 2017	25 September 2017	3	0	1	2	0.00
Belgium U19	1 July 2018	13 March 2020	18	6	6	6	33.33
Belgium U21	14 March 2020	Present	4	2	0	2	50.00
Career total			408	151	107	150	37.01

== Honours ==
Sint-Truiden

- Belgian Cup runner-up: 2003
