= Sint-Truidense VV =

Association football club in Belgium

STVV
- Full name: Koninklijke Sint-Truidense; Voetbalvereniging
- Nickname: De Kanaries (The Canaries)
- Founded: 23 February 1924
- Ground: Stayen
- Capacity: 14,600
- Owner: DMM.com
- Chairman: David Meekers
- Head coach: Jonas De Roeck
- League: Belgian Pro League
- 2025–26: Belgian Pro League, 3rd of 16
- Website: stvv.com
Home colours	Away colours

Koninklijke Sint-Truidense Voetbalvereniging (Dutch pronunciation: [ˈkoːnɪŋkləkə sɪnˈtrœydə(n)sə ˈvudbɑlvərˌeːnəɣɪŋ]), commonly known as Sint-Truiden or STVV (pronounced [ˌɛsteːveːˈveː]) or by their nickname De Kanaries (pronounced [də kaːˈnaːris]), is a Belgian professional football club located in the city of Sint-Truiden, Limburg that plays in the Belgian Pro League, the highest tier of football in Belgium.

Founded in 1924 with matricule number 373, STVV has played their home games at the Stayen since 1927. The club's best league finish was second in 1965–66. They also reached the final of the Belgian Cup twice.

== History ==
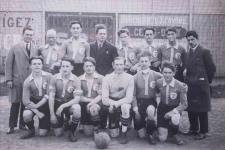
Founding of the club

The club was created in 1924 following the merger between FC Union and FC Goldstar, two clubs from Sint-Truiden. The colors of the club were chosen to be yellow and blue, to match the colors of the city, and it was named Sint-Truidense Voetbal Vereeniging. The first game of the team, against Cercle Tongeren, was played in front of only 9 attendees. In the late 1930s, Léopold Appeltans was the leading player of Sint-Truidense. On 21 November 1948 he became the first capped player for Belgium while playing at this club. In the late 1940s it qualified for the second division. It also changed its name to Sint-Truidense Voetbalvereniging in 1947. Five years later it finished second in the second division and thus promoted to the first division. Successful manager Raymond Goethals arrived at Sint-Truiden in 1959. Under his management, the team finished second of the top division in 1966.

The former Sint-Truidense goalkeeper Jacky Mathijssen became the manager of the club in 2001 and remained at the helm for three seasons after which he left for Charleroi. He was replaced by Marc Wilmots, who was fired shortly after. The team finished the season under the coaching of the trio Guy Mangelschots, Eddy Raymaekers and Peter Voets. At the end of the 2004–05 season the board of directors hired Oostende manager Herman Vermeulen but he was dismissed on 9 February 2006 as the club languished in seventeenth position. In 2008 the women's team of FCL Rapide Wezemaal joined STVV.

On 15 November 2017, Japanese-based electronic commerce and Internet company DMM.com acquired Sint-Truidense, becoming the full owner. Since the takeover, the club began recruiting and developing Japanese players, such as, Daichi Kamada, Wataru Endo, Takehiro Tomiyasu, Daniel Schmidt, Zion Suzuki, Daiki Hashioka and Joel Chima Fujita.

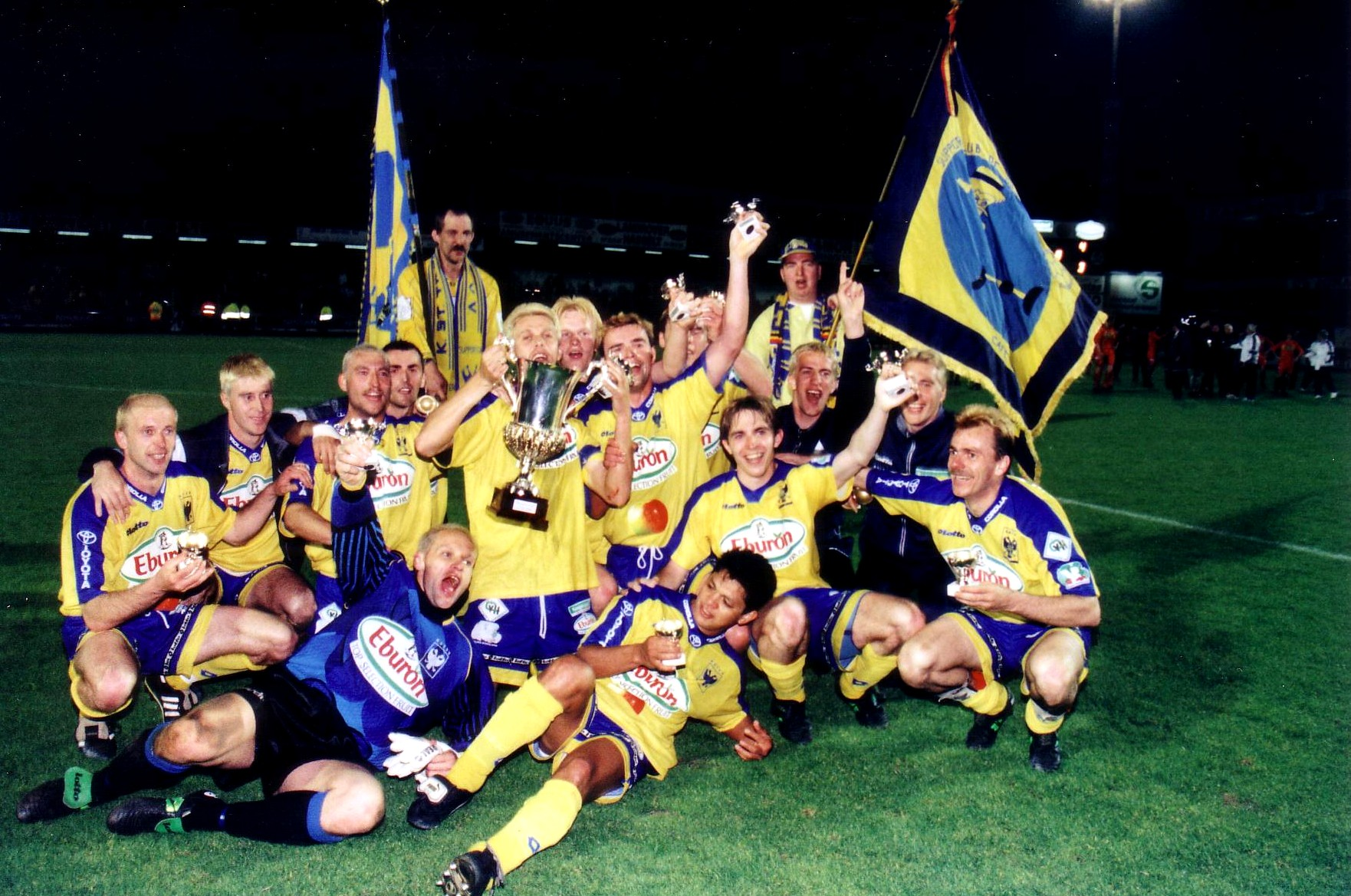
STVV won the League Cup in 1999

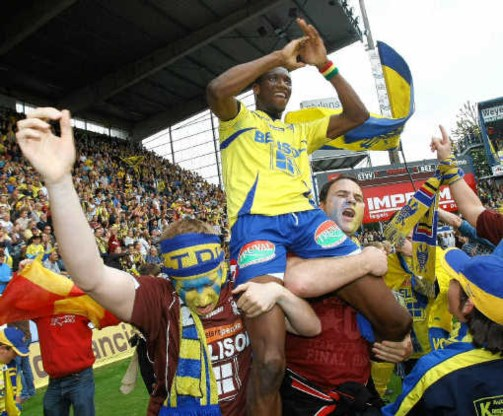
Promotion to the highest division in the season 2008–09

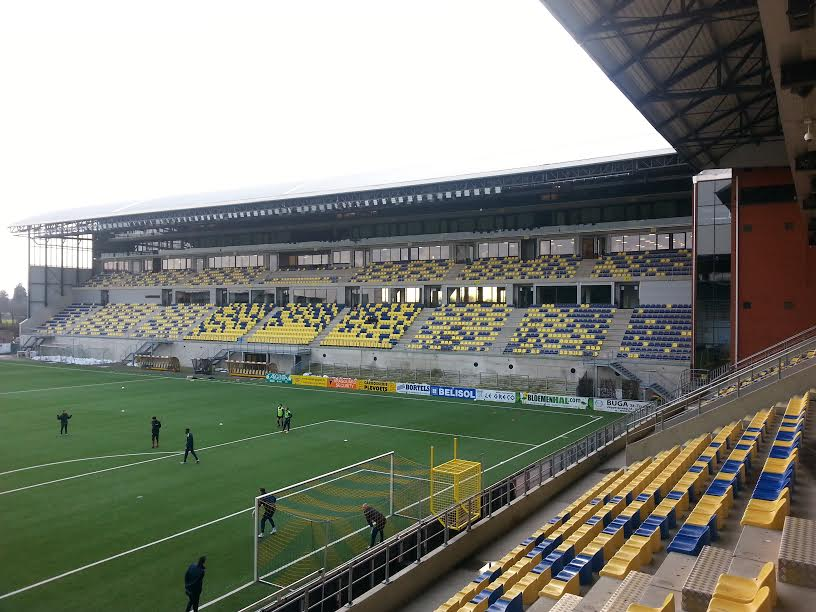
Stayen, the stadium of STVV

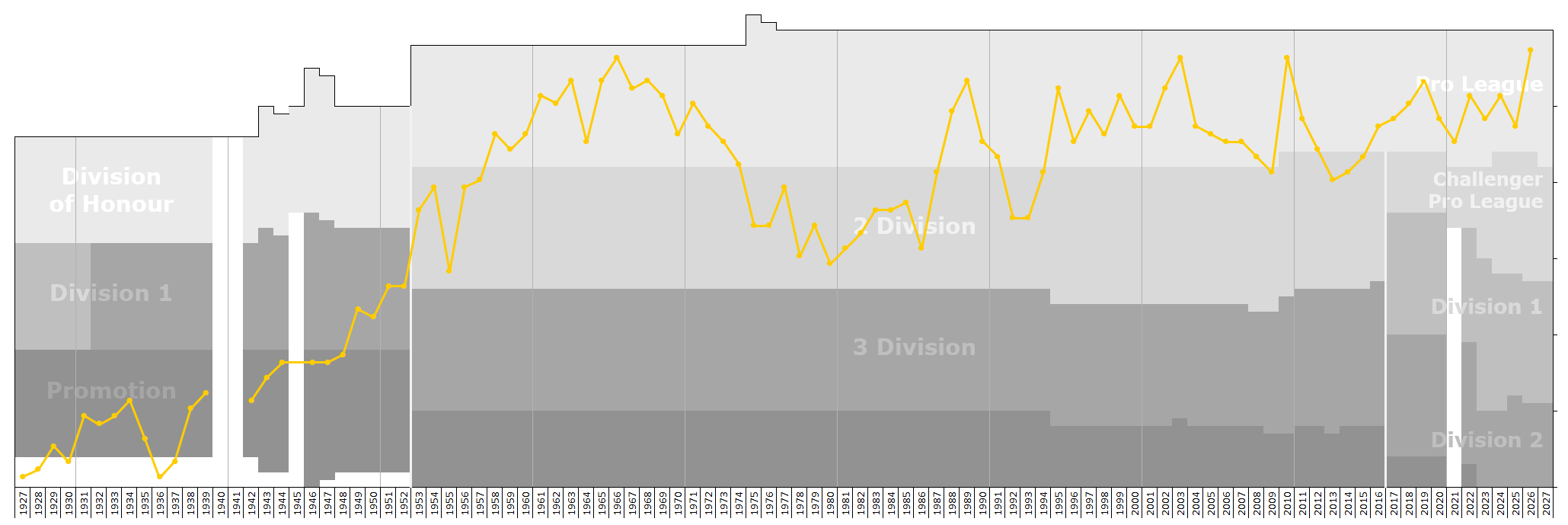
Historical chart of Sint-Truidense VV league performance

== Honours ==
- Belgian First Division
  - Runners-up (1): 1965–66
- Belgian Second Division
  - Winners (4): 1986–87, 1993–94, 2008–09, 2014–15
- Belgian Cup
  - Runners-up (2): 1970–71, 2002–03
- Belgian League Cup
  - Winners (1): 1998–99

== European competitions ==
=== Summary ===
Competition	Pld	W	D	L	GF	GA
UEFA Europa League	2	1	0	1	3	4
UEFA Conference League	0	0	0	0	0	0
UEFA Intertoto Cup	8	5	0	3	15	8
Total	10	6	0	4	18	12

=== Record ===
Season	Competition	Round	Club	Home	Away	Aggregate
1999–00	UEFA Intertoto Cup	1R	(Bulgaria) Spartak Varna	6–0	2–1	8–1
1999–00	UEFA Intertoto Cup	2R	(Armenia) Ararat Yerevan	3–1	2–0	5–1
1999–00	UEFA Intertoto Cup	3R	Austria Wien	0–2	2–1	2–3
2003–04	UEFA Intertoto Cup	2R	(Kazakhstan) Tobol	0–2	0–1	0–3
2025–26	UEFA Europa League	PO	(Cyprus) Omonia	1–0	2–4	3–4
2025–26	UEFA Conference League	LP	(Georgia (country)) Iberia 1999	2–0	—N/a	
2025–26	UEFA Conference League	LP	(Denmark) Midtjylland	—N/a	1–0	
2025–26	UEFA Conference League	LP	(Norway) Brann	1–1	—N/a	
2025–26	UEFA Conference League	LP	(Croatia) Hajduk Split	—N/a		
2025–26	UEFA Conference League	LP	(Netherlands) Ajax		—N/a	
2025–26	UEFA Conference League	LP	(Switzerland) Lugano	—N/a		

== Current squad ==
As of 3 September 2026

Note: Flags indicate national team as defined under FIFA eligibility rules; some limited exceptions apply. Players may hold more than one non-FIFA nationality.

No.	Pos.	Nation	Player
3	DF	JPN	Taiga Hata
4	DF	JPN	Kōta Takai (on loan from Tottenham Hotspur)
5	DF	JPN	Shōgo Taniguchi (captain)
7	FW	ALB	Arbnor Muja
8	MF	UGA	Abdoulaye Sissako
9	FW	BIH	Samed Baždar
10	FW	MAR	Ilias Sebaoui
11	FW	COD	Nathanaël Mbuku (on loan from Augsburg)
14	MF	FRA	Ryan Merlen
16	GK	JPN	Leo Kokubo
18	MF	JPN	Nelson Ishiwatari
19	FW	BEL	Frédéric Soèllé Soèllé
21	GK	BEL	Matt Lendfers

No.	Pos.	Nation	Player
22	DF	BEL	Wolke Janssens
23	DF	BEL	Joedrick Pupe
25	GK	KSA	Ahmad Abu Rasen
26	DF	MKD	Visar Musliu
27	DF	BEL	Jeremy Mbambi (on loan from Pisa)
31	MF	MAR	Illyès Benachour
33	MF	BEL	Alouis Diriken
38	FW	JPN	Kaito Matsuzawa
39	DF	BEL	Rune Verheyden
60	DF	BEL	Robert-Jan Vanwesemael
71	MF	JPN	Ryōtarō Araki
77	FW	SEN	Oumar Diouf
99	FW	JPN	Shion Shinkawa

=== Out on loan ===
Note: Flags indicate national team as defined under FIFA eligibility rules; some limited exceptions apply. Players may hold more than one non-FIFA nationality.

No.	Pos.	Nation	Player
—	DF	BEL	Hugo Lambotte (at Virton until 30 June 2027)
—	MF	BEL	Adam Nhaili (at Dender EH until 30 June 2027)

No.	Pos.	Nation	Player
—	FW	URU	Andrés Ferrari (at Sporting Gijón until 30 June 2027)
—	FW	BEL	Jay-David Mbalanda (at Olympic Charleroi until 30 June 2027)

== Coaching and medical staff ==
- Head coach: Frédéric De Meyer
- Assistant head coach:
- Physical coach: Stefan Winters
- Team manager: Peter Delorge
- Goalkeeping coach: Jurgen De Braekeleer
- Team representative: Romain Proesmans
- Kit men: Benny Liebens & Valere Stevens
- Club Doctors: Pieter Bormans & Peter Bollars
- Physiotherapists: Wouter Robijns & Par Vandenborne
- Masseur: Roger Reniers

== Managers ==
- (Belgium) Raymond Goethals (1959–66)
- (Belgium) Ward Volckaert (1966–69)
- (Belgium) Marcel Vercammen (1971–73)
- (Netherlands) Gerard Bergholtz (1979–81)
- (Belgium) Wilfried Van Moer (1982–84)
- (Belgium) Eric Vanlessen (1984–85)
- (Belgium) Guy Mangelschots (1986–90)
- (Belgium) Walter Meeuws (1990–91)
- (Belgium) Odilon Polleunis (1991–92)
- (Belgium) Rudy Liebens & (Poland) Marek Dziuba (1992)
- (Belgium) Albert Van Marcke (1992)
- (Belgium) Martin Lippens (1992–93)
- (Belgium) Guy Mangelschots (1992–96)
- (Belgium) Wilfried Sleurs (1996)
- (Belgium) Freddy Smets (1996–97)
- (Belgium) Guy Mangelschots (1997)
- (Netherlands) Barry Hulshoff (1997–98)
- (Belgium) Poll Peters (1998–99)
- (Belgium) Willy Reynders (1999–2001)
- (Belgium) Jules Knaepen (2001)
- (Belgium) Jacky Mathijssen (2001–04)
- (Belgium) Marc Wilmots (2004–05)
- (Belgium) Herman Vermeulen (2005–06)
- (Belgium) Eddy Raeymaekers & (Belgium) Peter Voets (2006)
- (Belgium) Thomas Caers (2006)
- (Belgium) Peter Voets (2006)
- (Netherlands) Henk Houwaart (2006–07)
- (Belgium) Valère Billen (2007)
- (Belgium) Peter Voets (2007)
- (Netherlands) Dennis Van Wijk (2007–08)
- (Belgium) Guido Brepoels (2008–11)
- (Belgium) Franky Van der Elst (2011–12)
- (Belgium) Guido Brepoels (2012–13)
- (Belgium) Yannick Ferrera (2013–15)
- (Republic of Ireland) Chris O'Loughlin (2015–16)
- (Croatia) Ivan Leko (2016–17)
- (Spain) Tintín Márquez (2017)
- (Belgium) Jonas De Roeck (2017–18)
- (Belgium) Marc Brys (2018–19)
- (Slovenia) Miloš Kostić (2020)
- (Australia) Kevin Muscat (2020)
- (Belgium) Peter Maes (2020–21)
- (Germany) Bernd Hollerbach (2021–23)
- (Germany) Thorsten Fink (2023–24)
- (Italy) Christian Lattanzio (2024)
- (Belgium) Felice Mazzù (2024)
- (Belgium) Frédéric De Meyer (2025) (caretaker)
- (Belgium) Wouter Vrancken (2025–26)
- (Belgium) Frédéric De Meyer (2026–present)
