= RAA Louviéroise =

Belgian football team

La Louvière
- Full name: Royale Association Athlétique; Louviéroise
- Nicknames: Les Loups (The Wolves), RAAL
- Founded: 26 January 1913; 113 years ago (creation); 30 March 1913; 113 years ago (registration)
- Dissolved: June 2009; 16 years ago
- Ground: Stade du Tivoli, La Louvière
- Capacity: 13,500
- Website: www.raal.be
Home colours	Away colours

RAA Louviéroise, sometimes referred to as La Louvière or RAAL, was a Belgian football club located in the city of La Louvière, in the province of Hainaut. It played its last run in the Belgian First Division from 2000–01 to 2005–06 included. Two players have been called to the Belgium national football team while at La Louvière: Guy Dardenne (6 caps when at La Louvière, 11 caps in all) and Silvio Proto (5 caps when at La Louvière). The matricule of the club was the number 93. In June 2009, it merged with RACS Couillet to form Football Couillet La Louvière. This club has since 2017 been named RAAL La Louvière.

== History ==
The club was founded on 26 January 1913 during a meeting at the Place Maugrétout in La Louvière. It was named AA Louviéroise. After one season in a provincial league, the football stopped due to the War. The club did not play official matches until 1921 as it had no stadium. Between 1921 and 1937 Louviéroise played in the provincial leagues. In 1937 the club changed its name to RAA Louviéroise and it reached the Promotion. The next year a Belgian international player (namely August Hellemans who played in the 1930 World Cup) was transferred at La Louvière.

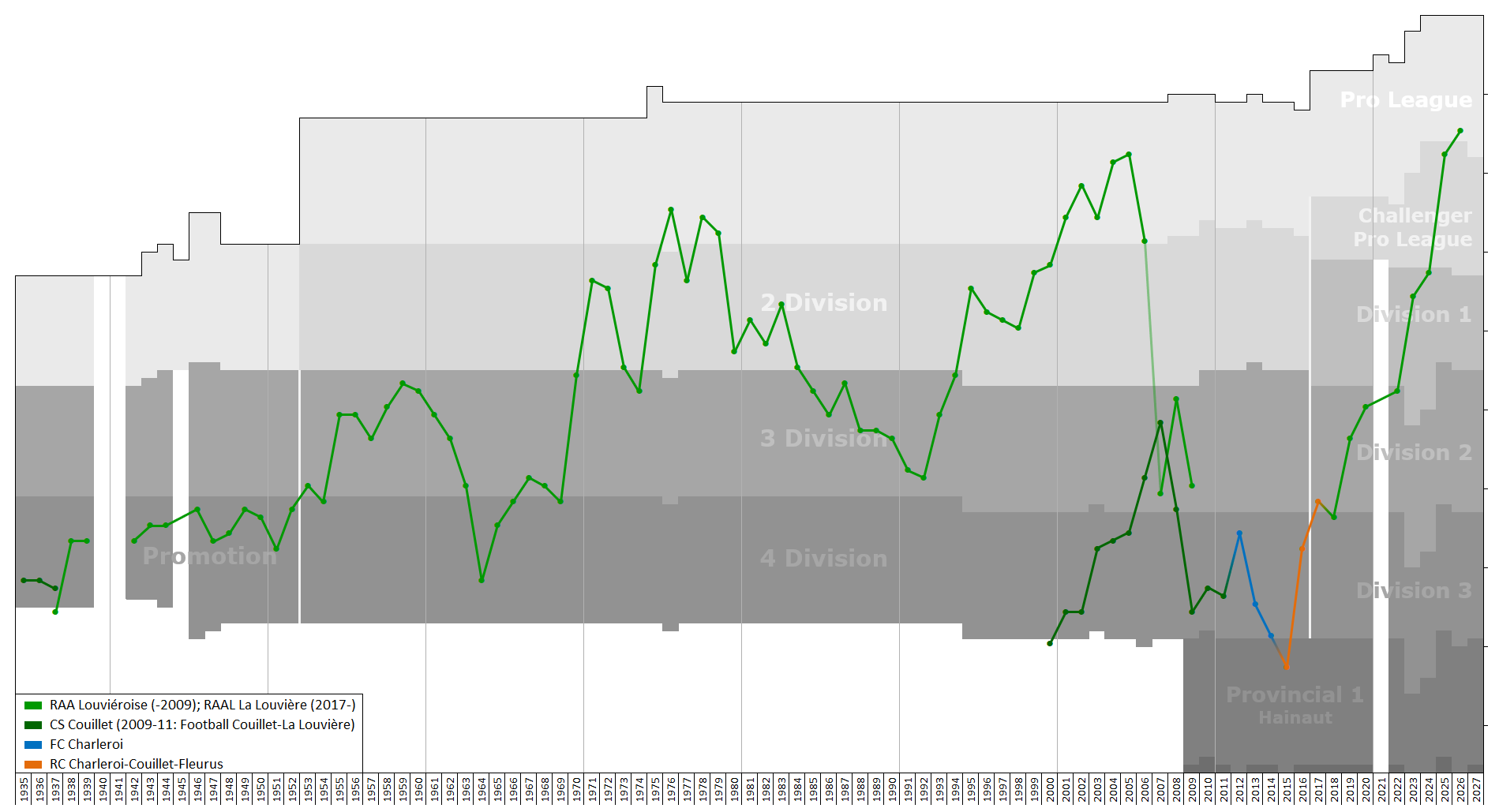
Historical league performance chart of RAA Louviéroise

The club had its first spell in the first division between 1977 and 1979. In 1984 it was relegated to the third division and it played at that level for 10 years. Between 1994 and 2000 it played in the second division.

In 2003, after winning the Belgian Cup, they qualify for the UEFA Cup for the first time in their history. They played the first round against Benfica, drawing at home 1-1, but losing by one goal in the away game (1–0). This marked the end of their only European journey.

In 2006 the club was one of the most frequently mentioned in a gambling scandal that rocked Belgian football. It was alleged in the Belgian press that several players, board members and manager Gilbert Bodart had accepted large sums of money from Chinese businessman Zheyun Ye, who wanted to influence the results in matches so he could manufacture high profits in gambling. At first the club strongly denied the allegations, but on 21 February 2006 Bodart resigned as manager.

His assistant, former La Louvière forward Frédéric Tilmant replaced him at the helm of the club but could not avoid RAAL finishing in last place in the division. This meant the club would have to play in the second division for the 2006–07 season. However, on 16 May 2006 the club was refused its license to play in the second division. It subsequently appealed the decision but the Appeal Commission of the Belgian Football Association confirmed the judgement of 16 May. The club eventually seized the Evocation Commission which rejected the plaint of La Louvière on 15 June 2006. The day after, chairman Filippo Gaone retired from the club as it would play the third division in 2006–07.

In 2009, La Louvière merged with RACS Couillet to form Football Couillet La Louvière, with the matricule number 93 begin retired as the new club continued with the number 94 of RACS Couillet. This club became RAAL La Louvière in 2017.

== Honours ==
- Belgian Cup:
  - Winners (1): 2002–03
- Belgian Supercup:
  - Runners-up (1): 2003
- Belgian Second Division final round:
  - Winners (3): 1975, 1977, 2000

== European record ==
Competition	Appearances	Matches played	Won	Drawn	Lost	GF	GA
2003–04 UEFA Cup	1	2	0	1	1	1	2
