= History of RSC Anderlecht =

Belgian football club history

The history of RSC Anderlecht started with the foundation of the association football club Sporting Club Anderlechtois on 27 May 1908 by a dozen of football lovers gathered by Charles Roos at the Concordia café (located on Rue d'Aumale in the Brussels municipality of Anderlecht).

== The early years (1908–1935) ==
Charles Roos was named as the club's first chairman. SC Anderlechtois won their first game 11–8 against Institut Saint-Georges. The ground of the club was then located near a cemetery in the current Rue du serment/Eedstraat, in the Scheut neighbourhood, about 800 metres away from the present stadium. As they were winning most of their matches, club secretary Michel Hames decided to join the official competitions in 1909. They began at the third level of provincial football and at the end of the season, they had already qualified to play in the higher division, finishing third behind the C teams of U Saint-Gilloise and Uccle Sport.

In 1911, Théo Verbeeck, then a forward at the club, became the club's second chairman at the age of 23. In 1913, Anderlecht reached the national level of football, gaining promotion to the Promotion, then the second level of football in Belgium. They ended the following season in fourth place (behind Uccle Sport, RC de Malines and FC Malinois). Because of World War I, the championship was then stopped until 1919. With the popularity of the team increasing, however, it was decided in 1917 that Anderlecht would move to the Astrid Park (known as the Meir park at that time) in a new stadium. They baptized the stadium Stade Emile Versé in honour of the club's first major patron, the industrialist Emile Versé. In 1919–20, Anderlecht finished third, failing to qualify for the top division.

For the following season, Sylva Brébart was appointed at the head of the team, becoming the first manager of the club, and Anderlecht finished together with FC Liégeois in third place once again. However, this time, the Royal Belgian Football Association had decided to let two more clubs play in the first division, which meant that the top three clubs in the Promotion would be promoted. FC Liégeois and SC Anderlechtois thus played a play-off game for promotion at the Daring Stadium in Molenbeek-Saint-Jean, which ended in a 1–1 draw. The replay was played in Tilleur and won by SC Anderlechtois (1–0) with a decisive goal by midfielder Maurice Versé. Ferdinand Adams was also one of the major contributors to this success, as he scored 30 goals in the championship in his second season with the club.

The first season at the top level for Anderlecht was tough as the club finished in 12th position (out of 14). It was striker Henri Thaels who scored the club's first goal ever in the first division, on 4 September 1921 in a game against FC Brugeois. In August 1922, Sylva Brébart was replaced by the Belgium national team's former manager Charles Bunyan, Sr. Ten days after the contract was signed, the new manager died and was replaced by his own son, Cyrille Bunyan. With only 15 points from 26 matches (a win earning two points at the time) at the end of the 1922–23 season, Anderlecht was unable to secure their status in the first division. They won the second division in the following season and finished ninth in the first division in 1924–25, but were relegated again in 1926. In total, they were relegated four times in ten years to the second division (1923, 1926, 1928 and 1931), earning themselves the mockery of local rival clubs Union Saint-Gilloise and Daring de Bruxelles.

Anderlecht achieved their best league position up to that point in 1929–30, when they reached the fifth spot in the top division. Twenty-five years after their formation, in 1933, the club changed their name to Royal Sporting Club Anderlechtois. During the 1934–35 season, the club was trained by Charles Gillis, but the team was composed by manager Claude Leclercq. After a bad start (two wins and four defeats in six matches), Claude Leclercq was sacked and the team was then composed by a committee (including the chairman Théo Verbeeck and the former manager and goalkeeper Florimond Plasch) up to the end of the season. This was a success, with Anderlecht winning one of the two tiers of the second division (the other one was won by RFC Brugeois) and promoting to the first division again, where they have remained since.

== First major successes (1935–1968) ==
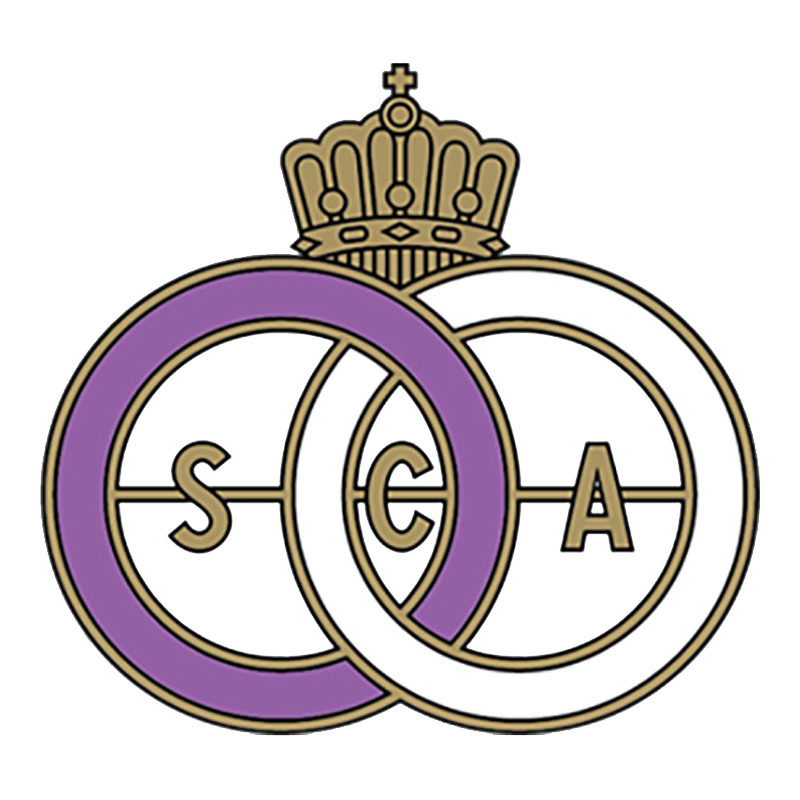
Sporting Club Anderlecht crest (1933–1959), similar to the logo of the Brussels based Union and Daring Club Molenbeek. This crest will later be integrated into a new crest.

Anderlecht reached fifth place in the first division again in 1938–39. The championship was then suspended due to World War II for two seasons. When it resumed in 1941–42, they finished sixth. At the end of this season, Anderlecht signed striker Jef Mermans from K Tubantia FC for 125,000 Belgian francs, a record fee in Belgium at that time. With the help of their striker (38 goals in 34 matches), soon nicknamed "The Bomber", Anderlecht won their first league title in 1946–47 after having finished second in 1943–44 and third in 1945–46 (the championship was cancelled in 1945). Their success increased in the following years as they won six more titles between 1948–49 and 1955–56, winning three consecutive titles twice.

After the 1949–50 season and the club's third league title, Bill Gormlie was appointed as a manager to replace Ernest Churchill Smith. Gormlie would become the longest-serving manager of the club, working at the head of the first team for nine seasons and 294 matches. He would also become the manager with the most championship titles for Anderlecht, with five wins. In the summer of 1952, Anderlecht celebrated the 40th years of Théo Verbeeck as chairman of the club and the club's fourth title, and the municipality changed the name of the stadium's street to Avenue Théo Verbeeck/Théo Verbeecklaan in his honour. A couple of weeks later, however, on 2 August, he died. He was replaced by a former player, Albert Roosens, at the club since 1943 as a joint secretary. Their 1954–55 title earned them the right to represent Belgium in the first ever European competition, the 1955–56 European Cup. Anderlecht lost both legs of their tie against Vörös Lobogo of Hungary. However, they won again the Belgian championship that season, and played once again in the European Cup the following year, losing to Manchester United (12–0 on aggregate) in the preliminary round. In 1958, the club celebrated their 50th anniversary by inviting Barcelona and their three Hungarian star players – Sándor Kocsis, László Kubala and Zoltán Czibor – to play a friendly game on 30 August. The match ended in a 3–3 draw. Anderlecht then won again the championship in 1958–59.

During the next season, Bill Gormlie resigned as manager and was replaced by caretaker manager Arnould De Raeymaeker, before French manager Pierre Sinibaldi took over during the summer break. A new era of the club started at this time, with several new players starting in the first team between 1959 and 1961: goalkeeper Jean-Marie Trappeniers, defenders Laurent Verbiest, Jean Plaskie and Georges Heylens, midfielder Paul Van Himst and striker Wilfried Puis. In 1959–60, on their next venture into European competition, Anderlecht lost both legs of their opening tie to Rangers of Scotland. Anderlecht then had to wait until the 1962–63 season to compete in Europe again, with the 1961–62 title, the first of Sinibaldi, and they won their first European match 1–0 with a goal by Armand "Jef" Jurion in the second leg of their tie with Real Madrid following a 3–3 draw in Spain. For the first time, they advanced to the second round, where they beat CSKA Red Star of Bulgaria before losing to Dundee in the quarter-finals.

In the 1960s, under the coaching of Pierre Sinibaldi, the club won five titles in a row (from 1963–64 until 1967–68), which is still a Belgian record. The 1964–65 title was the club's 11th title, then the Belgian record together with Union Saint-Gilloise. The star player of the team in the 1960s was Paul Van Himst (top scorer in 1965, 1967 and 1969 and Belgian Golden Shoe winner in 1960, 1961, 1965 and 1974). On 30 September 1964, the Belgium national team, coached by Raymond Goethals, fielded 11 Anderlecht players against the Netherlands after RFC Liégeois goalkeeper Guy Delhasse was substituted, to be replaced by Jean Trappeniers. The ten other players on the ground were Georges Heylens, Laurent Verbiest, Jean Plaskie, Jean Cornelis, Pierre Hanon, Armand Jurion, Jacques Stockman, Johan Devrindt, Paul Van Himst and Wilfried Puis. In the 1964–65 European Cup, after a 1–0 win at home, Anderlecht lost 2–1 at Bologna, and both teams had to play a replay (in Barcelona) that finished 0–0. Anderlecht finally qualified on the toss of a coin. In the second round, they were knocked out by Liverpool. The season after, they reached the quarter-finals again, this time meeting Real Madrid. But dubious refereeing in the second leg helped the Spanish to progress in the cup after a 4–3 victory on aggregate (the Belgians had won the first match 1–0).

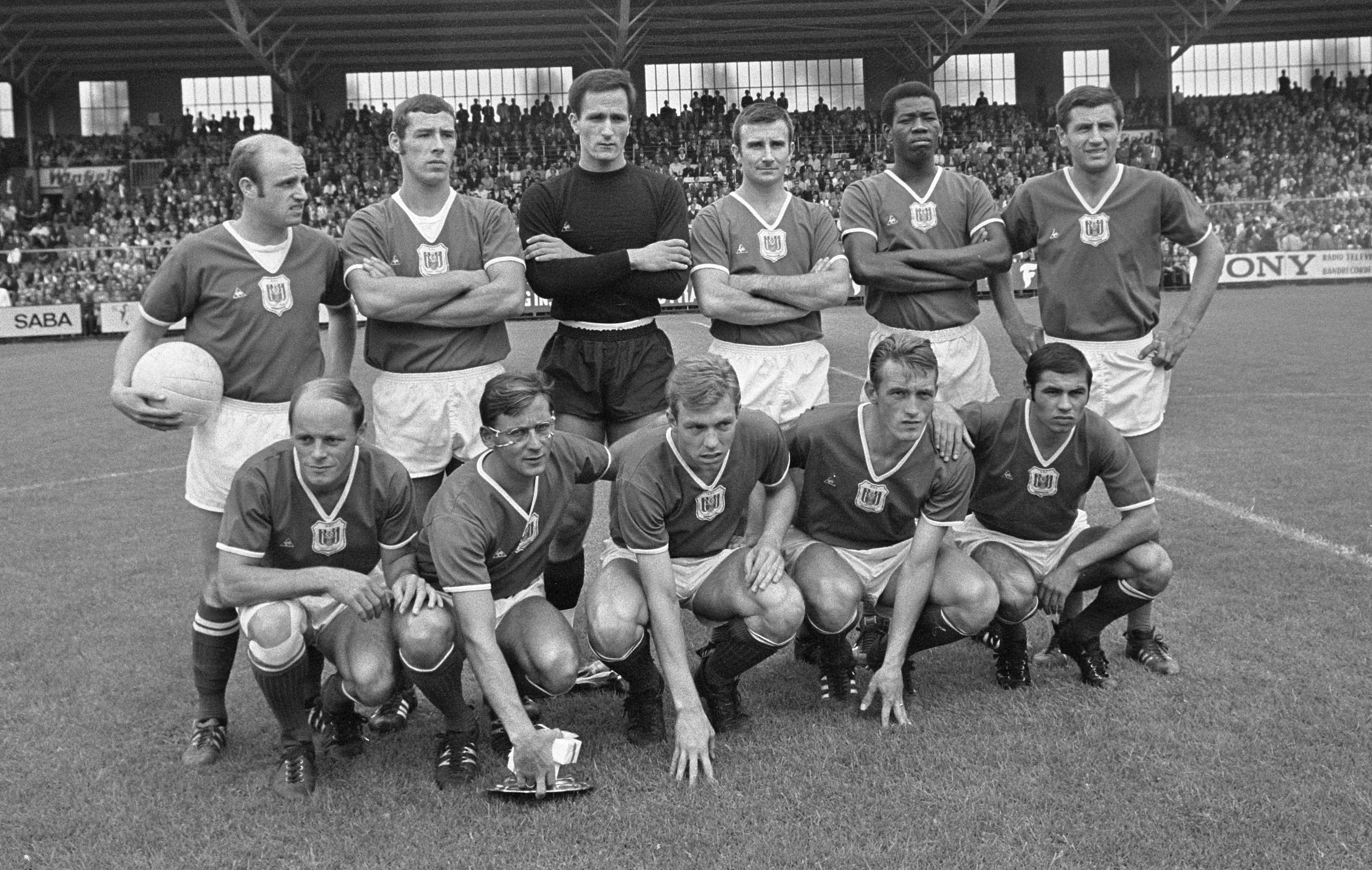
Anderlecht in the 1967–68 season

Since the arrival of Sinibaldi, the team had played in a "Brazilian" 4–2–4 formation, a departure from the W-M tactics (defense in a W-shape and attack in an M-shape; i.e., a kind of 2–3–3–2) used by former coach Bill Gormlie. After three consecutive title wins, Sinibaldi left the club in the summer of 1966 and was replaced by Hungarian Andreas Beres, who coached the team to two league championships in the following two seasons. In those two seasons, Anderlecht suffered consecutive second-round knockouts to Czechoslovak sides in the European Cup (Dukla Prague in 1966–67 and Sparta Prague in 1967–68).

== The European successes (1968–1984) ==
Anderlecht reached their first European final in 1970 in the Inter-Cities Fairs Cup, which would become the UEFA Cup two years later. That year, it was decided that, in the case of teams being level on aggregate after two matches, the team that had scored the most goals away would qualify. The new rule saw Anderlecht past Dunfermline and Newcastle United respectively at the second and third stages of the competition (having beaten Icelandic side Valur in the first round). In the semifinals, the Brussels team beat Inter Milan, but after they had won the final's home leg against Arsenal 3–1, they lost 3–0 at Highbury in the second leg. Anderlecht also participated to the next and last Inter-Cities Fairs Cup, due to their second consecutive domestic league fourth place, but they lost in the third round to Vitória de Setúbal of Portugal. They finished the championship in third place in that season.

During the summer of 1971, a new chairmen was appointed at the head of the club. Albert Roosens was replaced by former Anderlecht and Belgium player Constant Vanden Stock. He directly transferred several players, among which included Dutch goalkeeper Jan Ruiter and forward Rob Rensenbrink. Anderlecht won their next domestic title at the end of the season, on the last matchday, with a little help from another Brussels team: Racing White's draw with Club Brugge, who had gone into the final round of matches as league leaders, enabled Anderlecht to claim the championship. They also won the Belgian Cup for the second time, making also their second double.

The next season, Club Brugge won the championship at the Astrid park, a measure of revenge after they had finished second for five seasons in a row, while Les Mauves et Blancs ended the season in sixth place, their worst performance since 1952. This was the beginning of a long rivalry between the two teams. Anderlecht though managed to secure a place in Europe by winning the Cup again, entering for the first time the European Cup Winners' Cup, as their tenth consecutive European season. That year, Anderlecht finished on top once again with a team led by players Rensenbrink, Ludo Coeck, Paul Van Himst and Attila Ladinszky. Before the 1973–75 season, chairman Constant Vanden Stock decided to have the club's first shirt sponsor printed, which was his own brewery Belle-Vue.

A period then started when the club would win only one championship in ten seasons, between 1974–75 and 1983–84, but they achieved considerable European success during this period, winning two European Cup Winners' Cups, two European Super Cups and one UEFA Cup. This period started in 1974–75, when Anderlecht reached – for the third time in their history – the quarter-finals of the European Cup, losing to Leeds United 4–0 on aggregate. In the championship, they finished in third place, behind the new merger club from Brussels, R White Daring Molenbeek, and Royal Antwerp, and they won the Cup 1–0 against Antwerp. They thus earned the right to play the Cup Winners' Cup for the second time, in 1975–76. They easily eliminated Rapid București, then Borac Banja Luka of Yugoslavia in the first two rounds. The third round tie, against Welsh cup winner Wrexham, at that time playing in the English third division, proved more difficult (2–1 on aggregate). They knocked East German side FSV Zwickau out in the semifinals. In the final, they defeated West Ham United 4–2 at the Heysel Stadium in Brussels, claiming their first European title ever. Rob Rensenbrink and François Van der Elst scored twice each, while Ludo Coeck, one of the key players of the team, was injured. Anderlecht also won the Belgian Cup, against Lierse (4–0). In spite of a very good season, Dutch manager Hans Croon was replaced by Raymond Goethals.

Anderlecht was again qualified to play the Cup Winners' Cup in Europe, and reached the final again, this time losing to Hamburger SV of West Germany 2–0 at the Olympic Stadium in Amsterdam.

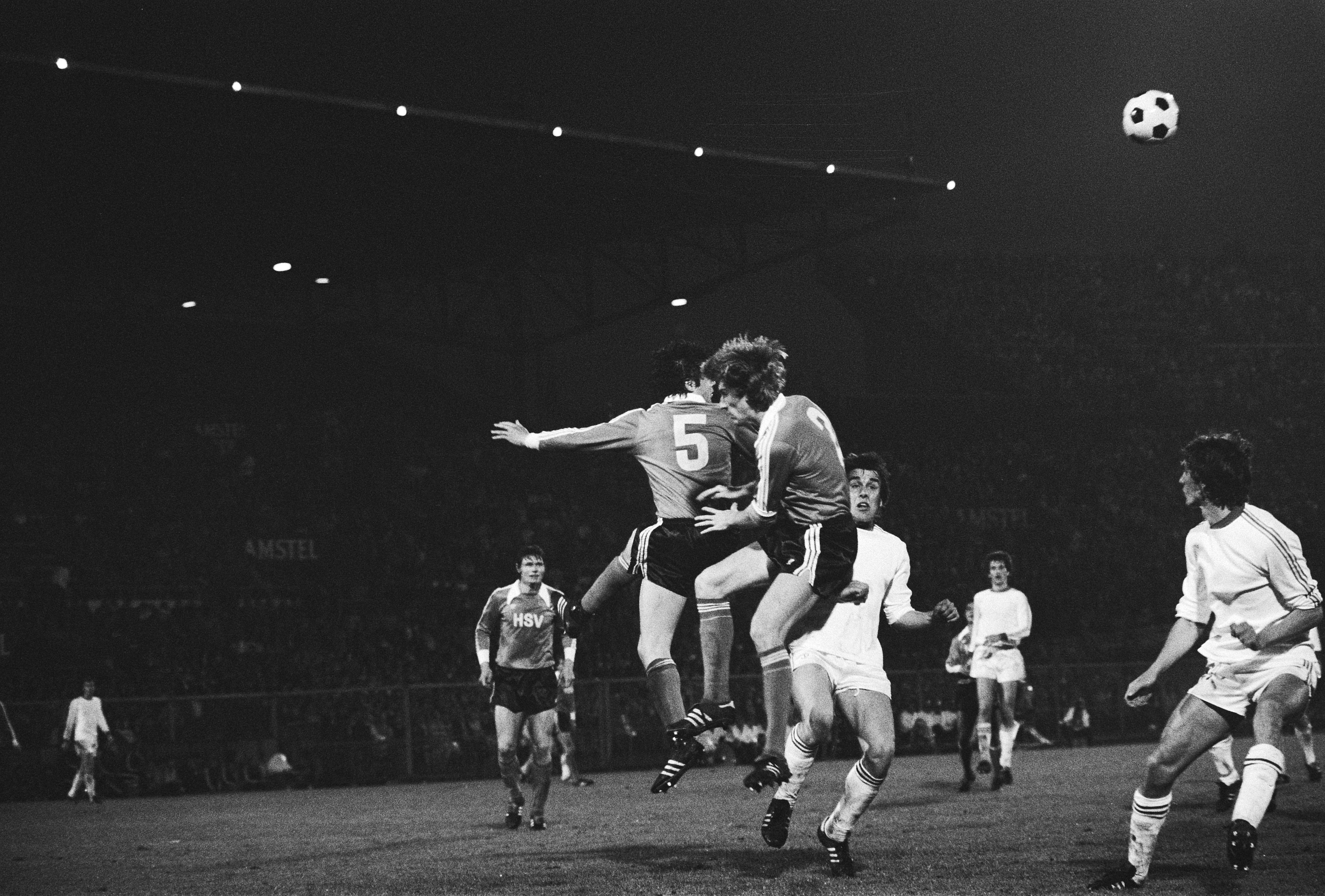
Europa Cup II final against HSV, May 11 1977

Goethals played with the same team as Croon did one year earlier in the final, save for defender Michel Lomme, who was replaced by Erwin Vandendaele. The ten other players on the field were Dutch goalkeeper Jan Ruiter; defenders Hugo Broos, Gilbert Van Binst and Jean Thissen; midfielders Jean Dockx, Ludo Coeck, François Van der Elst and the Dutch Peter Ressel; and forwards Arie Haan and Rob Rensenbrink. Earlier in the season, they played the 1976 European Super Cup, winning against the European Cup holder, the Bayern Munich of Franz Beckenbauer, Gerd Müller, Uli Hoeneß and Karl-Heinz Rummenigge. The first leg was lost 2–1 at the Olympiastadion but Anderlecht won the second leg 4–1 at home. In the national competitions, Anderlecht finished second in the championship behind Club Brugge for the second consecutive season, and also lost the Cup final against Club Brugge.

Anderlecht's common starting lineup in the European finals in the 70s

Anderlecht thus qualified again for the 1977–78 European Cup Winners' Cup, with the domestic championship winner Club Brugge qualifying for the European Cup. Anderlecht exacted their revenge in the second round of this competition after eliminating the reigning Cup Winners' Cup holders, Hamburger SV. After that, they eliminated also Porto and Twente to reach their third consecutive Cup Winners' Cup final. The match was played in Paris at the Parc des Princes against Austria Wien. Anderlecht won 4–0, with two goals by Rob Rensenbrink and two by Gilbert Van Binst. Club Brugge won again the championship, with the Purples and White finishing second.

At the start of this 1977–78 season, several new players had arrived: Dutchmen Nico de Bree and Johnny Dusbaba and Dane Benny Nielsen. Franky Vercauteren become also a regular in the first team for the second consecutive season. At the start of the 1978–79 season, Anderlecht won the 1978 European Super Cup against Liverpool, winning the first leg 3–1 at home, then losing 2–1 at Anfield Road. They also entered the Cup Winners' Cup, as title holder, together with Belgian Cup holder, Beveren, but they lost in the second round to Barcelona, who would eventually win the Cup, eliminating Beveren in the semi-finals. This was a very good season for Beveren, as they won the Belgian league ahead of Anderlecht. At the end of the season, manager Raymond Goethals was replaced by Urbain Braems. With him, Anderlecht lost in the first round of the UEFA Cup against Dundee United, in the quarter-finals of the Belgian Cup against Standard Club Liégeois and ultimately finished fifth in the Belgian league.

A new manager was thus hired to start the 1980–81 season, Tomislav Ivić, and new players were transferred, including defenders Morten Olsen and Luka Peruzović. During the winter break, Juan Lozano and Wim Hofkens were also transferred. Jacky Munaron was installed as goalkeeper and previous season signing Kenneth Brylle became a first team regular. All those arrivals proved successful, with Anderlecht winning their long-awaited 17th championship title. In 1981, Anderlecht changed their shirt sponsor, signing a contract with bank Général de Banque.

In 1981–82, Anderlecht lost the title to Standard Liège, but they achieved their best result so far in the European Cup, reaching the semi-finals after having eliminated Juventus in the second round and Red Star Belgrade in the quarter-finals. In the semi-finals, they lost to the eventual winners Aston Villa. The 1982–83 season was a noteworthy season for the club for numerous reasons: former Anderlecht star player Paul Van Himst was appointed as manager, the club won their third European title and the rebuilding of the club's stadium began at the end of the season. But in the domestic league, Anderlecht had to settle for second place behind Standard. The day before the journey to Kuopion Pallotoverit for their UEFA Cup first round match in 1982, Paul Van Himst replaced Tomislav Ivić. Anderlecht easily won (6–1 on aggregate), and they knocked out Porto (6–3 on aggregate) and FK Sarajevo (6–2 on aggregate) in the following two rounds. Two wins over Valencia saw the club through to the semifinals, where they faced Bohemians Prague, who were beaten 4–1 over two legs. For their first UEFA Cup final since the Inter-Cities Fairs Cup was taken over by UEFA, Anderlecht beat Benfica in two legs, 1–0 at home and 1–1 away, to win their fifth European trophy in seven years.

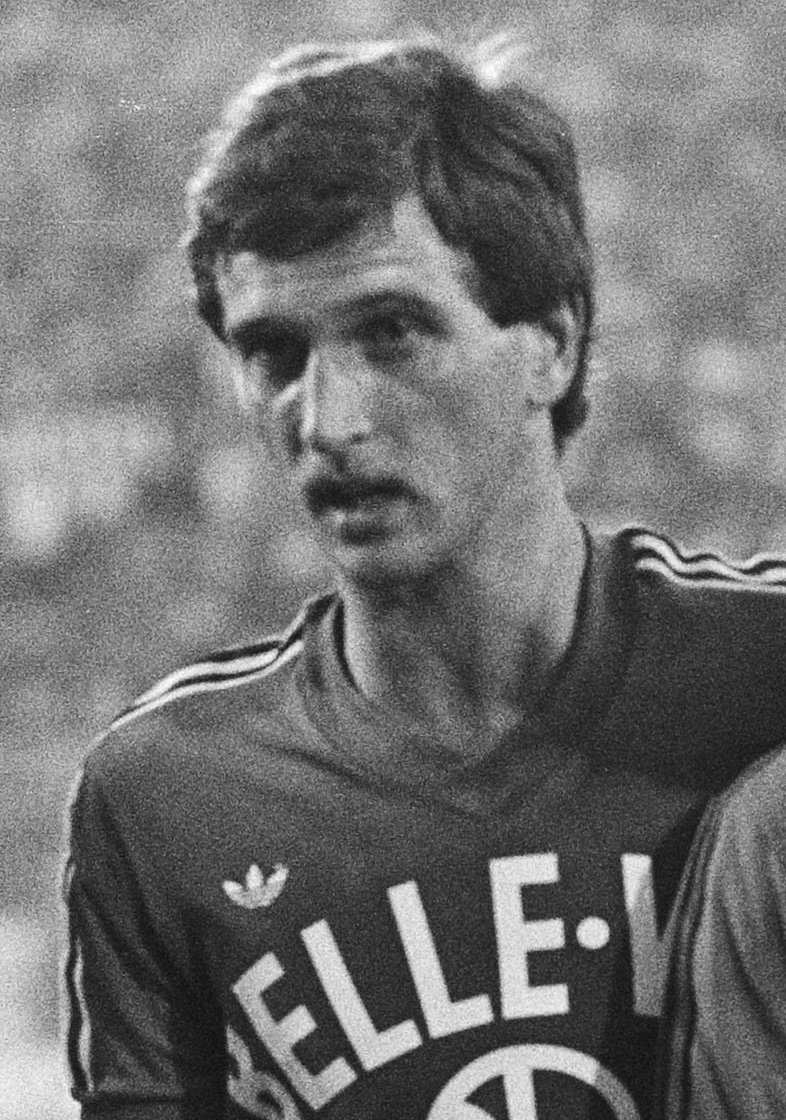
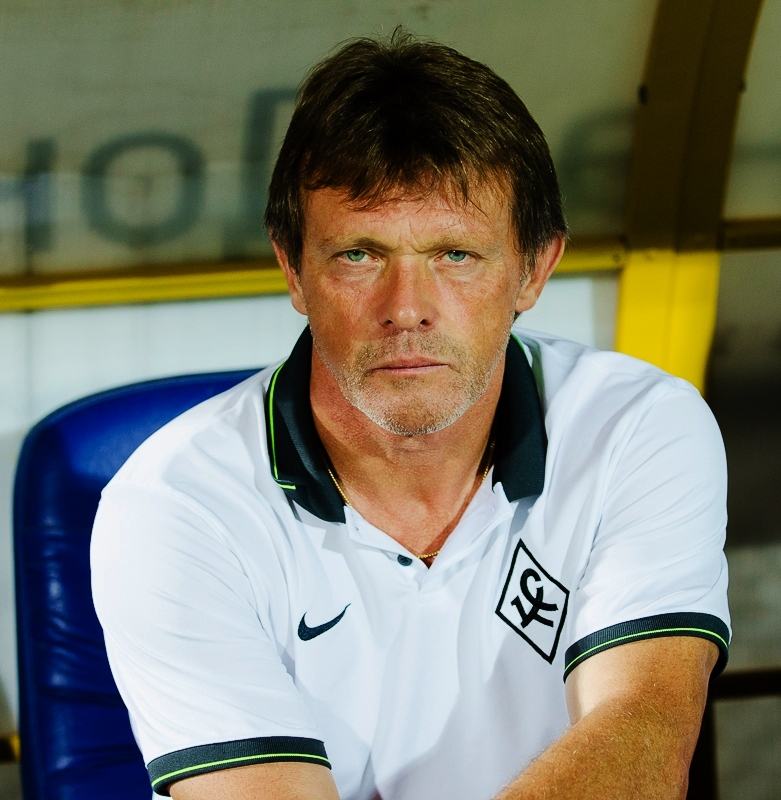
Ludo Coeck (p. 1978) and Franky Vercauteren (p. 2015) played in each of the 5 European finals that Anderlecht won between 1976 and 1983.

Two new Belgian players had arrived this season, Erwin Vandenbergh and Alex Czerniatynski. The starting 11 for the home leg of the UEFA Cup final were goalkeeper Jacky Munaron; defenders Wim Hofkens, Luka Peruzović, Morten Olsen and Michel De Groote; midfielders Per Frimann, Ludo Coeck, Franky Vercauteren and Juan Lozano; and strikers Erwin Vandenbergh and Kenneth Brylle. In the second leg, defenders Walter De Greef and Hugo Broos started in the place of Wim Hofkens and Kenneth Brylle. In 1983–84, Anderlecht finished second in the championship, again behind Beveren. They also reached the UEFA Cup final but their route to the final was less straightforward. In the third round, they were leading 1–0 at Lens with a goal by Erwin Vandenbergh, but the Frenchmen equalized with a goal from a wicked deflection which left goalkeeper Jacky Munaron helpless. At home, Anderlecht secured a 1–0 win. After beating Spartak Moscow in the quarter-finals, they lost 2–0 at Nottingham Forest in the semi-finals. They won the second leg 3–0 in dubious circumstances. It later emerged that the referee officiating the match had been paid a bribe totalling £27,000 by Anderlecht's chairman. In the final, Tottenham Hotspur beat Anderlecht after a penalty shootout.

== Decline in Europe (1984–2000) ==
After three second-place finishes in a row in the Belgian league, the Purple and Whites secured an easy 18th title, 11 points ahead of Club Brugge, in 1984–85. The club scored 100 goals in 34 league matches that season, with 22 goals by Alex Czerniatynski and 20 by Erwin Vandenbergh. It was the first title under the coaching of Paul Van Himst, who was fired in the middle of the following season, replaced by Arie Haan. For his first European match at the head of the team, they eliminated Bayern Munich (3–2 on aggregate) in the quarter-finals of the 1985–86 European Cup, reaching the semifinals for the second time in the club's history. They lost in the semifinals to Steaua București. After a two-legged play-off against Club Brugge, Anderlecht won the championship after both clubs ended the season with 52 points. Erwin Vandenbergh finished as the competition top scorer with 27 goals. Club Brugge forced a 1–1 draw away to Anderlecht, and led 2–0 at home after 30 minutes, but Anderlecht managed to equalise and won the championship on the away goals rule.

The 1986–87 European Cup was the season of revenges, with Anderlecht beating the defending champions Steaua București in the second round and Bayern Munich beating Anderlecht in the quarter-finals. Anderlecht won their 20th championship title on the last matchday of the season when they easily beat Berchem Sport (who were already relegated) while joint leaders KV Mechelen lost to Club Brugge, who needed a win to qualify for the UEFA Cup. Franky Vercauteren and Enzo Scifo were then transferred in the summer window, while Juan Lozano had been heavily injured in a game at KSV Waregem a few months earlier. A weakened team coached by Raymond Goethals, after Georges Leekens had been sacked in February, finished only fourth in 1987–88, behind Club Brugge, Mechelen and Antwerp, but they managed to lift the Belgian Cup for the sixth time in their history after a 2–0 victory against Standard Liège, with goals by Luc Nilis and Eddie Krnčević. The next season, Anderlecht retained the trophy with goals by Krnčević and Jankovic (again with a 2–0 win over Standard), but finished second in the championship. In the meantime, they had lost in the second round of the 1988–89 European Cup Winners' Cup to the defending champions, KV Mechelen. After his second cup win, Raymond Goethals left for Bordeaux and was replaced by Aad de Mos. This was also the last season at the club for Jacky Munaron, Michel De Groote and Eddie Krnčević.

Anderlecht reached their last European final to date in the 1989–90 European Cup Winners' Cup, after beating Barcelona in the quarter-finals, eventually losing the final 2–0 to Sampdoria after extra time, with two goals by Gianluca Vialli. They also finished as runners-up in the championship, with Marc Degryse scoring 18 goals in his first season at the club. Luís Oliveira also scored his first goals for the club during the 1989–90 season. A successful generation, including Luc Nilis, Marc Degryse, Luís Oliveira, Danny Boffin, Philippe Albert, Johnny Bosman and Bertrand Crasson, helped the early 1990s to be glorious for Anderlecht on national level, as they clinched four titles in five seasons between 1990–91 and 1994–95, as well as one Cup title in 1993–94, winning the final against Club Brugge 2–0.

At the end of the 1992–93 season, RSC Anderlechtois merged with the women's team Brussels Dames '71 to become RSC Anderlecht. In Europe, Anderlecht reached the quarter-finals of the 1990–91 UEFA Cup, eliminating Borussia Dortmund in the third round, losing to Roma in the next round. In the next season, Anderlecht entered the first European Cup to include a group stage, which was also the last season before the competition became the UEFA Champions League. They eliminated Grasshoppers and PSV in the first two rounds, reaching the group stage (then two groups of four teams), ending third in Group A behind Sampdoria and Red Star Belgrade and ahead of Panathinaikos. After the inception of the Champions League, they reached the group stage in two consecutive years, placing fourth in a group with Werder Bremen, Porto and eventual winners Milan in 1993–94, which was also their 30th consecutive season in European competitions, and repeating the same ranking the next year in a group with Benfica, Hajduk Split and Steaua București. At the end of the season, and in spite of winning three consecutive Belgian championships, manager Johan Boskamp was sacked and replaced by the German Herbert Neumann.

The second half of the decade proved to be harder, with the next championship win only in 1999–2000. In 1995–96, Anderlecht finished second in the championship, and lost in the qualifying round of the 1995–96 Champions League to Hungarian side Ferencváros. This was the first time that Anderlecht lost their first match in Europe since the 1980–81 UEFA Cup, when they lost against 1. FC Kaiserslautern. After the first leg, lost 0–1 at home, new Anderlecht manager Herbert Neumann was fired after only four games at the head of the team, thus becoming the manager with the fewer matches with Anderlecht. He was eventually replaced by Johan Boskamp, after three matches with Raymond Goethals and Jean Dockx as caretaker managers. At the end of the season, Anderlecht chairman Constant Vanden Stock retired and was replaced by his son Roger Vanden Stock. In 1996–97, Anderlecht ended fourth in the championship, their worst ranking in the last nine seasons, but they were runners-up of the Belgian Cup, losing the final to Germinal Ekeren, 4–2 after extra time. They also reached the quarter-finals of the 1996–97 UEFA Cup, losing 3–2 on aggregate against eventual runners-up Inter Milan, which is still the last time Anderlecht reached this stage in European competitions. At the end of the season, Johan Boskamp was replaced by René Vandereycken, who was sacked before the winter break due to bad results, with only 20 points on 42 in the league and a second round elimination in the UEFA Cup at the hands of Schalke 04. Arie Haan took the team over after one match with Jean Dockx as caretaker manager. With Arie Haan, Anderlecht managed to qualify in extremis for the 1998–99 UEFA Cup, finishing fourth in the championship thanks to a goal by Gaston Taument in the last game of the season, at Beveren (0–1). After a bad start in the 1998–99 season, with only 6 points on 21 and a shock 6–0 defeat at Westerlo, as well as a 0–2 defeat in the first leg of the 1998–99 UEFA Cup first round against Grasshoppers, Arie Haan was sacked and replaced by Jean Dockx and Franky Vercauteren. Anderlecht eventually drawn with Grasshoppers 0–0 in the second leg. After an impressive come-back in the championship, with among others a 0–6 victory at rivals Standard Liège and a 2–5 victory at eventual champions Genk, Anderlecht finished the season in third place. At the end of the season, Jean Dockx and Franky Vercauteren became assistant of former Genk manager Aimé Anthuenis. Under his coaching, Anderlecht won their 25th title in 1999–2000.

== Recent years (2000–present) ==
In the 21st century, Anderlecht confirmed their status as the top club in Belgium, finishing only once out of the top two (third in 2001–02) and winning five titles between 2000–01 and 2009–10. In 2000–01, their most successful European campaign since reaching the UEFA Cup quarter-finals in 1996–97, Anderlecht beat Porto in the third qualifying round of the Champions League to progress to the first group stage. They finished first in their group ahead of Manchester United, despite having lost their first group match 5–1 to Manchester United at Old Trafford and their third one 4–0 at Dynamo Kyiv. In the second group stage, they finished third behind Real Madrid and Leeds United, securing a 2–0 victory in their last match against Real Madrid, who had already qualified for the quarter-finals. In the championship, Anderlecht finished on top ahead of Club Brugge and Standard Liège. They dominated the league with their two forwards, the small and fast Tomasz Radzinski (23 league goals in 2000–01) and the tall Jan Koller (22 league goals in 2000–01). Both players were then sold, Radzinski to Everton and Koller to Borussia Dortmund.

The next season, they reached the first group stage of the 2001–02 Champions League, but finished last of their group, with only three draws (two against Roma and one against Lokomotiv Moscow) and three defeats, among which a shock 1–5 home defeat against Lokomotiv. In the league, Anderlecht finished third behind Genk and Club Brugge, and they were defeated for the third time in four years in the first round of the Belgian Cup, this year by Lokeren. At the end of the season, Anthuenis was sacked and replaced by Hugo Broos. With him, Anderlecht reached the round of 16 of the 2002–03 UEFA Cup, losing to Panathinaikos. They finished second in the league and lost in the quarter-finals of the Cup to Sint-Truiden. The 2003–04 season saw Anderlecht face a very tough draw against Bayern Munich, Lyon and Celtic. Although they managed one win and a draw from their home games and put up a credible showing in the away matches, seven points and a fourth-place finish was the outcome. In the 2004–05 and 2005–06 seasons, Anderlecht again qualified for the group stage quite easily, but were drawn in a very tough group on both occasions, firstly with Valencia, Inter Milan and Werder Bremen, then with Chelsea, Liverpool and Real Betis the following season. Anderlecht lost all matches at the group stage in 2004–05 and set an unwanted Champions League record of most consecutive defeats. However, in their last match of the 2005–06 group phase, with Anderlecht already eliminated from the competition, it was Vincent Kompany's winning goal at Real Betis ended their nightmare run. In the Belgian league, Anderlecht won the championship twice, in 2003–04 and in 2005–06. During the 2004–05 season, Hugo Broos was sacked and replaced by his assistant Franky Vercauteren.

Anderlecht then won the championship again, for the second time in a row with Vercauteren, but they failed to impress in Europe, finishing fourth again in their 2006–07 Champions League group. They had gained direct qualification for the Champions League proper, and although they had dropped from the third into the fourth pot of the draw, they got what seemed to be an easier draw as in the previous years, with Milan, Lille and AEK Athens. However, they disappointingly failed to win a single game, losing two and drawing four, and were eliminated from European contention altogether with four points in fourth place. During the 2007–08 season, Vercauteren was dismissed and replaced by his assistant Ariel Jacobs. They had lost in the third qualifying round of the Champions League against Fenerbahçe. Consequently, they beat Rapid Wien in the first round of the UEFA Cup. A win against Hapoel Tel Aviv, a loss against Getafe and draws against Aalborg BK and Tottenham Hotspur proved enough to finish third in the group to go to the next round, where Anderlecht eliminated Bordeaux.

In the round of 16, Bayern Munich proved too strong, recording a big win in Anderlecht. The 1–2 win in Munich was not enough to go to the quarter-finals. Anderlecht won the Belgian Cup that year as their only trophy of the season, with a 3–2 win against Gent. Former Gent players Mbark Boussoufa and Guillaume Gillet both scored a goal in the final. In 2008–09, they finished very close to champions Standard Liège after a two-legged play-off for the title. Both clubs had finished level with 77 points after the regular season, and although Anderlecht had a better goal difference (+45 for +40 to Standard), a play-off was organised to determine the Belgian champions. The first leg ended in a draw 1–1 at the Constant Vanden Stock Stadium, but Standard were crowned champion after a 1–0 victory in the second leg. Romelu Lukaku made his first league appearance when he replaced Honduran international Víctor Bernárdez in the 64th minute of this match. Anderlecht then won the next championship in a dominating fashion, losing only three games out of 38 and finishing 18 points ahead of Gent even after their bonus of 12 points after the regular competition had been halved to six for the remaining ten games of the championship play-off.

In the 2008–09 Champions League, Anderlecht failed to reach the third qualifying round after losing to BATE Borisov. During the 2009–10 season, after winning against Turkish side Sivasspor 6–3 aggregate, Anderlecht lost both matches in the third qualifying round to Lyon, losing away 1–5 and home 1–3 after Lyon's Lisandro López scored a hat-trick. In the 2009–10 UEFA Europa League, they became winners of their group with Ajax, Dinamo Zagreb and Romanian side Politehnica Timișoara. In the round of 32, they knocked out Athletic Bilbao after drawing 1–1 and winning 4–0 at home in the return game. However, they were eventually knocked out in the round of 16 against Hamburger SV. In the 2010–11 season, after winning against Welsh side The New Saints 6–1 aggregate, Anderlecht were eliminated from the Champions League in the play-off round against Partizan after a 4–4 aggregate draw, and a subsequent 3–2 defeat after a penalty shootout. At national level, the rivalry with Standard intensified when Anderlecht lured former Standard player Milan Jovanovic to the Astridpark in the 2011-12 season and went on to recruit Dieumerci Mbokani back from AS Monaco. Ariël Jacobs' team became national champions for the 31st time that year. Jacobs' cycle was over and his contract was not renewed.

RSC Anderlecht gave a chance to Dutch coach John van den Brom in the 2012-13 season. His first major achievement was qualification for the group stage of the 2012-13 UEFA Champions League in which it gained 5 points in its pool. RSC Anderlecht finished the Play-offs 1st and became national champions for the 32nd time. The still young Dennis Praet, Senegalese Cheikhou Kouyaté, Guillaume Gillet and Lucas Biglia were part of the champions' squad. The following season was much more difficult for Van den Brom. The team finished last of its pool in the UEFA Champions League group stage with just one point. Anderlecht finished 3rd in the regular league before having to start the Play-offs. By then, John van den Brom had already been replaced by his assistant Besnik Hasi. In the Play-offs, Anderlecht realised a quasi flawless run which allowed RSC Anderlecht to finish 1st in Play-offs 1 and thus crown themselves national champions for the 33rd time. Chancel Mbemba, Aleksandar Mitrović, Massimo Bruno and 16-year-old Youri Tielemans were the new names that broke through that season. The 2014-15 & 2015-16 seasons were not sporting high-fliers.

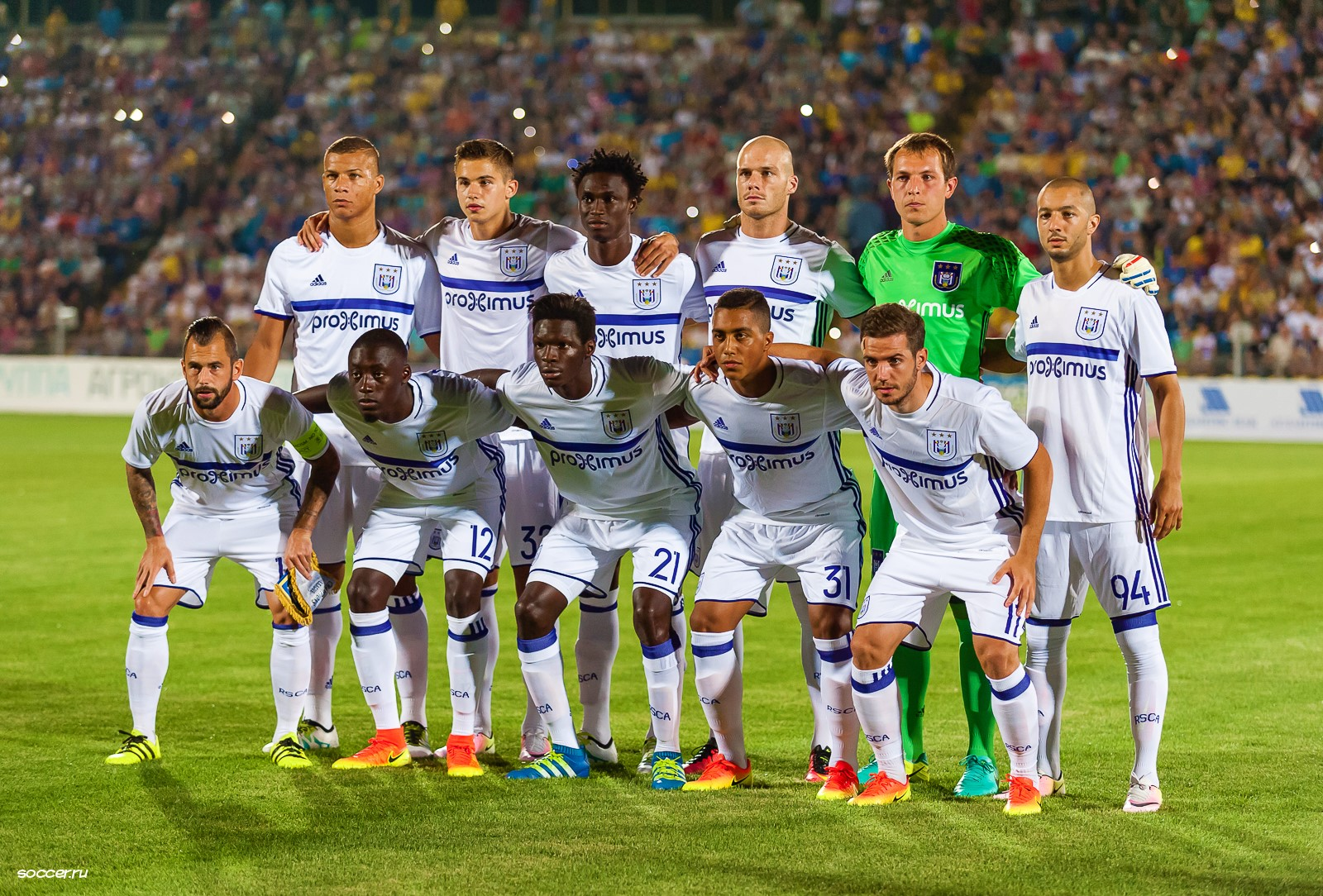
Anderlecht during the 2016-17 season

In the 2016-17 season, a young coach was again chosen, Swiss René Weiler who came over from Germany's FC Nürnberg. Spurred on by their own youth players Leander Dendoncker and Youri Tielemans and top scorer Łukasz Teodorczyk, Anderlecht finished 1st in the regular league. In the 2016-17 UEFA Europa League, it reached the quarter-finals and was narrowly eliminated by José Mourinho's Manchester United. A few weeks later, RSC Anderlecht got to celebrate its 34th national title on the field of R. Charleroi S.C.

On 20 December 2017, it was announced that entrepreneur and billionaire Marc Coucke would take over RSC Anderlecht. In mid-2019, Coucke pulled off a stunt of stature by bringing in Vincent Kompany as player-trainer, but the combination of the two roles did not prove ideal upon which Frank Vercauteren was recruited as head coach. After yet another long-term injury, Kompany quit as a player in August 2020 and became Anderlecht's head coach after Vercauteren was sacked. Before the 2022-23 football season, Anderlecht and Kompany ended their collaboration by mutual agreement. Kompany moved to Burnley F.C. and was replaced by Felice Mazzù who transferred from Union Sint-Gillis. Many supporters questioned the departure of Kompany, who had finished third and reached the Belgian Cup final the previous season. After 4 months, Mazzù was replaced by Danish coach Brian Riemer.

Riemer's side finished a disappointing eleventh in the 2022-23 league, but made it to the quarter-finals of that season's UEFA Europa Conference League before losing to AZ Alkmaar. The 2023-24 season saw Anderlecht become title contenders once again, finishing third after a tight battle with Union SG and Club Brugge for the title.

== See also ==
- List of RSC Anderlecht seasons
