= Cédric Olondo =

Dutch footballer

Personal information
- Full name: Cédric Olondo-Utshumbe
- Date of birth: 31 December 1982 (age 43)
- Place of birth: Lubumbashi, Zaïre
- Height: 1.88 m (6 ft 2 in)
- Position: Forward

Senior career*
Years	Team	Apps	(Gls)
2001–2005	Standard Liège		
2003–2004	→ Royale Union Liègeoise (loan)		
2004–2005	→ K.S.K. Ronse (loan)		
2005–2006	K.V.V. Heusden-Zolder		
2006–2009	Fortuna Sittard		
2010–2011	FC Oss		
2011	Ethnikos Piraeus		
2012	RUW Ciney		
- * Club domestic league appearances and goals

Cédric Olondo (born 31 December 1982) is a retired Belgian football striker.
