= 1975–76 in Belgian football =

Football in Belgium
- Season: 1975–76

The 1975–76 season was the 73rd season of competitive football in Belgium. Club Brugge KV won their third Division I title. RSC Anderlechtois won the Belgian Cup against K Lierse SK (4-0) and they won the 1975–76 European Cup Winners' Cup, while Club Brugge KV reached the final of the 1975–76 UEFA Cup. The Belgium national football team ended their UEFA Euro 1976 qualifying campaign with a defeat against Netherlands in the second round, after they finished first of their group in the first round. The Belgian Women's First Division was won by Standard Fémina de Liège for the second time. For the first time, the Belgian Golden Shoe was awarded to a stranger, Dutch international player Johan Boskamp.

== Overview ==
Belgium continued the UEFA Euro 1976 qualifications in Group 7 with a win over Iceland, a defeat against East Germany and a draw against France. They finished on top of Group 7 with 8 points, 1 point ahead of East Germany, and thus qualified for the second qualifying round. This play-off was played against the Netherlands, and Belgium lost the first game with 5-0 (with 3 goals by RSC Anderlechtois striker Rob Rensenbrink), after what the Belgium manager Raymond Goethals was sacked and replaced by Guy Thys for the second leg. In the second leg, Belgium also lost (1-2), with goals by Johnny Rep and legendary player Johan Cruyff for the Netherlands. This game marked the start of a new generation of Belgian players, with goalkeeper Jean-Marie Pfaff playing his first game for Belgium in place of Christian Piot. Other experienced players Raoul Lambert and Jan Verheyen were also not selected for this match. Paul Van Himst had stopped his international career at the end of the previous season. New players would emerge this season with the Red Devils, like defenders Georges Leekens, Hugo Broos and Eric Gerets and midfielders Ludo Coeck and François Van der Elst.

At the end of the season, the number of teams in Division I was decreased from 19 to 18, so the bottom two teams in Division I (K Berchem Sport and KRC Mechelen) as well as RAA Louviéroise (who finished 14th) were relegated to Division II. to be replaced by Division II champions KFC Winterslag and the Belgian Second Division final round winners, KV Kortrijk.
The bottom 3 teams in Division II (R Albert Elisabeth Club Mons, R Tilleur FC and K Olse Merksem SC) were relegated to Division III, to be replaced by both Division III winners (Royale Union and KAS Eupen).
The bottom 2 clubs of each Division III league (K Stade Leuven, RRC Tournaisien, Léopold Club Bastogne and KFC Herentals) together with the 14th-placed team with the fewest points (KAV Dendermonde) were relegated to Promotion, to be replaced by the winner of each Promotion league (KFC Izegem, KVC Jong Lede, K Wit-Ster FC Beverst and Wavre Sports).

== National team ==
Date	Venue	Opponents	Score	Comp	Belgium scorers
September 6, 1975	Stade de Sclessin, Liège (H)	Iceland	1-0	ECQ	Raoul Lambert
September 27, 1975	Stade Emile Versé, Brussels (H)	East Germany	1-2	ECQ	Wilfried Puis
November 15, 1975	Parc des Princes, Paris (A)	France	0-0	ECQ	
April 25, 1976	Feijenoord Stadion, Rotterdam (A)	Netherlands	0-5	ECP	
May 22, 1976	Heysel Stadium, Brussels (H)	Netherlands	1-2	ECP	Roger Van Gool

Key

- H = Home match
- A = Away match
- N = On neutral ground
- F = Friendly
- ECQ = European Championship qualification
- ECP = European Championship play-off
- o.g. = own goal

== European competitions ==
R White Daring Molenbeek beat Viking FK of Norway in the first round of the 1975–76 European Champion Clubs' Cup (won 3–2 at home, 1–0 away).
In the second round, they lost to HNK Hajduk Split of Yugoslavia (lost 0–4 away, 2–3 at home).

RSC Anderlechtois eliminated FC Rapid București of Romania in the first round of the 1975–76 European Cup Winners' Cup (lost 0–1 away, won 2–0 at home).
They then eliminated FK Borac Banja Luka of Yugoslavia in the second round (won 3–0 at home, lost 0–1 away), Wrexham FC of Wales in the quarter-finals (won 1–0 at home, drew 1–1 away) and BSG Sachsenring Zwickau of East Germany in the semi-finals (wins 3–0 away, 2–0 at home) to reach the final of a European competition for the second time.
In the final, they beat West Ham United of England 4–2, and so became the first Belgian club to win a European competition.

R Antwerp FC (2nd in the championship) and Club Brugge KV (4th) qualified to play the 1975–76 UEFA Cup. In the first round, Antwerp beat Aston Villa FC (won 4–1 at home, 1–0 away) while Club Brugge KV beat Olympique Lyonnais of France (lost 3–4 away, won 3–0 at home).
In the second round, Club Brugge went on by beating Ipswich Town FC (lost 0–3 away, win 4–0 at home), but Antwerp was eliminated by Śląsk Wrocław of Poland (drew 1–1 away, lost 1–2 at home).
Club Brugge then eliminated AS Roma of Italy in the third round (won 1–0 home and away), AC Milan of Italy in the quarter-finals (win 2–0 at home, lost 1–2 away) and Hamburger SV of West Germany in the semi-finals (drew 1–1 away, won 1–0 at home).
For the first time in their history, Club Brugge reached the final of a European competition: however they lost to Liverpool FC (lost 2–3 away, drew 1–1 at home).

== Honours ==
Competition	Winner
Division I	Club Brugge KV
Cup	RSC Anderlechtois
Women Division I	Standard Fémina de Liège
Division II	KFC Winterslag
Division III	Royale Union and KAS Eupen
Promotion	KFC Izegem, KVC Jong Lede, K Wit-Ster FC Beverst and Wavre Sports

== Final league tables ==
=== Division I ===
- 1975–76 Top scorer: Dutchman Hans Posthumus (K Lierse SK) with 26 goals
- 1975 Golden Shoe: Dutchman Johan Boskamp (R White Daring Molenbeek)
