= 1938–39 in Belgian football =

Football in Belgium
- Season: 1938–39

The 1938–39 season was the 39th season of competitive football in Belgium. R Beerschot AC won their 7th and last Premier Division title. The next season of Belgian football was interrupted due to World War II. Official competitions resumed in the 1941-42 season.

== Overview ==
At the end of the season, R Daring Club de Bruxelles and RFC Brugeois were relegated to Division I, while SC Eendracht Aalst (Division I A winner) and R Tilleur FC (Division I B winner) were promoted to the Premier Division.
FC Wilrijck, Cappellen FC, RCS Schaerbeek and Wezel Sport were relegated from Division I to Promotion, to be replaced by R Fléron FC, RCS Hallois, RRC Tournaisien and Herenthals SK.

== National team ==
Date	Venue	Opponents	Score*	Comp	Belgium scorers
January 29, 1939	Heysel Stadium, Brussels (H)	Germany	1-4	F	Emile Stijnen
March 19, 1939	Olympisch Stadion, Antwerp (H)	The Netherlands	5-4	F	Jean Capelle (3), Jean Fievez, Raymond Braine
April 23, 1939	Olympic Stadium, Amsterdam (A)	The Netherlands	2-3	F	Raymond Braine, Fernand Buyle
May 14, 1939	Stade du Pont d'Ougrée, Liège (H)	Switzerland	1-2	F	Bernard Voorhoof
May 18, 1939	Heysel Stadium, Brussels (H)	France	1-3	F	Robert Lamoot
May 27, 1939	Stadion ŁKS, Łódź (A)	Poland	3-3	F	Jean Fievez, Raymond Braine, Hendrik Isemborghs

* Belgium score given first

Key

- H = Home match
- A = Away match
- N = On neutral ground
- F = Friendly
- o.g. = own goal

== Honours ==
Competition	Winner
Premier Division	R Beerschot AC
Division I	SC Eendracht Aalst and R Tilleur FC
Promotion	R Fléron FC, RCS Hallois, RRC Tournaisien and Herenthals SK
