= 2009–10 in Belgian football =

Football in Belgium
- Season: 2009–10

The 2009–10 football season in Belgium, which is the 107th season of competitive football in the country and runs from August 2009 until July 2010.

== Promotion and relegation ==
Team promoted to 2009–10 Belgian First Division

- Belgian Second Division Champions: Sint-Truiden

Teams relegated from Belgian First Division 2008–09

- 15th Place: Dender (lost playoff)
- 17th Place: Tubize
- 18th Place: Mons

Teams promoted to 2009–10 Belgian Second Division

- Belgian Third Division A Champions: Standaard Wetteren
- Belgian Third Division B Champions: Turnhout
- Playoff winners: Boussu Dour Borinage

Teams relegated from 2008 to 2009 Belgian Second Division

- 18th Place: Deinze
- 19th Place: Namur
- Playoff losers: Olympic Charleroi
- Playoff losers: Virton
- Playoff losers: Hamme

Teams promoted to 2009–10 Belgian Third Division

- Belgian Promotion A Champions: Coxyde
- Belgian Promotion B Champions: Temse
- Belgian Promotion C Champions: Heist
- Belgian Promotion D Champions: Bleid
- Playoff winners: Ieper
- Playoff winners: Torhout
- Playoff winners: Hasselt
- Playoff winners: Ternat

Teams relegated from 2008 to 2009 Belgian Third Division

- 16th Place in Third Division A: Gent-Zeehaven
- 15th Place in Third Division B: Seraing
- 16th Place in Third Division B: Union La Calamine
- Playoff losers: Hamoir
- La Louvière went bankrupt and merged with Belgian Promotion team Couillet to form Couillet La Louvière in the Promotion division.

== Honours ==
Competition	Winner
Pro League	Anderlecht
Second division	Lierse
Third division A	Heist
Third division B	Visé
Promotion A	Izegem
Promotion B	Bornem
Promotion C	Verbroedering Geel-Meerhout
Promotion D	Bertrix
Cup	Gent
Supercup	Anderlecht

== League competitions ==
=== Belgian First Division ===
Pos	Team	Pld	W	D	L	GF	GA	GD	Pts	Qualification or relegation
1	Anderlecht (C, O)	28	22	3	3	62	20	+42	69	Qualification to Championship play-offs
2	Club Brugge	28	17	6	5	52	33	+19	57	Qualification to Championship play-offs
3	Gent	28	14	7	7	49	30	+19	49	Qualification to Championship play-offs
4	Kortrijk	28	12	9	7	39	30	+9	45	Qualification to Championship play-offs
5	Sint-Truiden	28	12	6	10	35	35	0	42	Qualification to Championship play-offs
6	Zulte Waregem	28	10	11	7	39	32	+7	41	Qualification to Championship play-offs
7	Mechelen	28	12	3	13	36	46	−10	39	Qualification to Europa League play-offs
8	Standard Liège	28	10	9	9	38	34	+4	39	Qualification to Europa League play-offs
9	Cercle Brugge	28	11	5	12	45	40	+5	38	Qualification to Europa League play-offs
10	Germinal Beerschot	28	9	8	11	30	43	−13	35	Qualification to Europa League play-offs
11	Genk (O)	28	8	10	10	33	31	+2	34	Qualification to Europa League play-offs
12	Westerlo	28	8	8	12	28	34	−6	32	Qualification to Europa League play-offs
13	Charleroi	28	5	8	15	28	45	−17	23	Qualification to Europa League play-offs
14	Lokeren	28	5	3	20	22	54	−32	18	Qualification to Europa League play-offs
15	Roeselare (R, Q)	28	4	6	18	29	58	−29	18	Qualification to the Relegation play-offs
16	Mouscron (R)	0	0	0	0	0	0	0	0	Relegation to 2010–11 Belgian Third Division (Note: Mouscron were relegated due to the club's financial problems, which caused them to forfeit three consecutive matches. Their record was expunged.)

Source: soccerway.com
Rules for classification: 1) points; 2) number of matches won; if teams are still tied a playoff is organised.
(C) Champions; (O) Play-off winners; (Q) Qualified for the phase indicated; (R) Relegated
Notes:

Pos	Team	Pld	W	D	L	GF	GA	GD	Pts	Qualification
1	Anderlecht (C)	10	7	3	0	24	9	+15	59	Qualification to Champions League third qualifying round
2	Gent	10	4	4	2	20	13	+7	41	Qualification to Champions League third qualifying round
3	Club Brugge	10	3	3	4	14	15	−1	41	Qualification to Europa League play-off round
4	Sint-Truiden	10	3	4	3	9	10	−1	34	Qualification to Europa League Testmatch
5	Kortrijk	10	3	1	6	9	13	−4	33	
6	Zulte Waregem	10	2	1	7	7	23	−16	28	

Rules for classification: 1) points; 2) points after deduction of (possible) half points added due to rounding; 3) number of wins; 4) goal difference; 5) number of goals scored; 6) number of away goals scored; 7) number of away wins.
(C) Champions

Pos	Team	Pld	W	D	L	GF	GA	GD	Pts	Qualification	WES	KVM	CER	LOK
1	Westerlo (A)	6	3	1	2	12	9	+3	10	Playoff Final		0–2	4–1	2–0
2	Mechelen	6	3	1	2	10	8	+2	10		1–3		1–0	3–1
3	Cercle Brugge	6	2	1	3	9	12	−3	7	Qualification for the Europa League second qualifying round	2–0	2–1		1–1
4	Lokeren	6	1	3	2	12	14	−2	6		3–3	2–2	5–3	

Legend: Blue = home team win; Yellow = draw; Red = away team win.
(A) Advance to the Final

Pos	Team	Pld	W	D	L	GF	GA	GD	Pts	Qualification	GNK	STA	GBA	CHA
1	Genk (A)	6	5	1	0	12	3	+9	16	Playoff Final		1–0	2–0	3–0
2	Standard	6	2	2	2	8	5	+3	8		1–1		3–0	2–0
3	Germinal Beerschot	6	1	2	3	6	12	−6	5		1–3	2–2		2–2
4	Charleroi	6	1	1	4	4	10	−6	4		1–2	1–0	0–1	

Legend: Blue = home team win; Yellow = draw; Red = away team win.
(A) Advance to the Final

==== Europa League playoff final ====
2 May 2010
20:30 CEST

Genk	2 – 2	Westerlo
De Bruyne 84'; Yeboah 90'	Report	Yakovenko 22'; Liliu 62'

Cristal Arena, Genk
Attendance: 18.125
Referee: Paul Allaerts

7 May 2010
20:30 CEST

Westerlo	0 – 3	Genk
	Report	João Carlos 4'; Buffel 71'; Ogunjimi 81'

Het Kuipje, Westerlo
Attendance: 8.200
Referee: Johan Verbist

Genk won 5–2 on aggregate.

==== Testmatches Europa League ====
13 May 2010
20:30 CEST

Genk	2 – 1	Sint-Truiden
Ogunjimi 19'; Camus 59'	Report	Sidibe 40'

Cristal Arena, Genk
Attendance: 22.183
Referee: Jérôme Efong Nzolo

16 May 2010
20:30 CEST

Sint-Truiden	2 – 3	Genk
Sidibe 6' (pen.); Onana 79'	Report	Ogunjimi 21'; Barda 44'; Buffel 56'

Staaienveld, Sint-Truiden
Referee: Johan Verbist

Genk won 5–3 on aggregate.

=== Belgian Second Division ===
Pos	Team	Pld	W	D	L	GF	GA	GD	Pts	Promotion or relegation
1	Lierse (C, P)	36	21	12	3	75	32	+43	75	Belgian First Division
2	Lommel	36	20	10	6	55	27	+28	70	Qualification for Belgian Second Division final round
3	Mons	36	19	9	8	56	32	+24	66	Qualification for Belgian Second Division final round
4	Eupen (O, P)	36	16	12	8	56	37	+19	60	Qualification for Belgian Second Division final round
5	Borinage	36	13	14	9	46	43	+3	53	
6	Waasland	36	13	13	10	46	49	−3	52	
7	Oostende	36	12	15	9	49	45	+4	51	
8	Antwerp	36	10	17	9	55	53	+2	47	
9	OH Leuven	36	11	12	13	50	66	−16	45	
10	Wetteren	36	12	8	16	48	59	−11	44	
11	Tournai	36	11	11	14	50	51	−1	44	
12	Tienen	36	11	10	15	44	58	−14	43	
13	Dender	36	10	13	13	45	49	−4	43	
14	Brussels	36	11	9	16	47	53	−6	42	
15	Tubize	36	9	15	12	41	41	0	42	
16	Turnhout	36	10	11	15	50	57	−7	41	
17	Ronse (R)	36	10	9	17	51	57	−6	39	Qualification for Relegation play-off
18	Beveren (D, R)	36	8	12	16	37	55	−18	36	Relegation to Belgian Third Division
19	RFC Liège (R)	36	5	8	23	23	60	−37	23	Relegation to Belgian Third Division

Updated to match(es) played on 27 May 2010. Source: Soccerway
Rules for classification: 1) points; 2) number of matches won; if teams are still tied a playoff is organised.
(C) Champions; (D) Ceased operations for men’s team; (O) Play-off winners; (P) Promoted; (R) Relegated

=== Belgian Third Division ===
==== Belgian Third Division A ====
Pos	Team	Pld	W	D	L	GF	GA	GD	Pts	Promotion or relegation
1	Heist (C, P)	36	23	7	6	73	34	+39	76	Belgian Second Division
2	Rupel Boom	36	21	9	6	82	46	+36	72	Belgian Third Division Final Round
3	Aalst	36	20	7	9	82	44	+38	67	Belgian Third Division Final Round
4	Deinze	36	17	9	10	50	38	+12	60	Belgian Third Division Final Round
5	Temse	36	16	8	12	61	60	+1	56	
6	Coxyde	36	15	10	11	66	43	+23	55	
7	Hamme	36	15	10	11	59	51	+8	55	
8	Hoogstraten	36	14	8	14	59	55	+4	50	
9	Sint-Niklaas	36	14	7	15	62	55	+7	49	
10	Racing Waregem	36	14	6	16	43	51	−8	48	
11	Oudenaarde	36	11	15	10	62	62	0	48	
12	Torhout	36	13	6	17	49	51	−2	45	
13	Wielsbeke	36	11	12	13	50	62	−12	45	
14	Ternat	36	12	5	19	53	72	−19	41	
15	Cappellen	36	11	6	19	40	62	−22	39	
16	Sottegem	36	11	5	20	32	65	−33	38	Relegation to Promotion play-off
17	Ieper (R)	36	10	7	19	53	70	−17	37	Relegation to Belgian Fourth Division
18	Racing Mechelen (R)	36	8	13	15	52	71	−19	37	Relegation to Belgian Fourth Division
19	Willebroek (R)	36	8	6	22	40	76	−36	30	Relegation to Belgian Fourth Division

Source: soccerway.com
Rules for classification: 1) points; 2) number of matches won; if teams are still tied a playoff is organised.
(C) Champions; (P) Promoted; (R) Relegated

==== Belgian Third Division B ====
Pos	Team	Pld	W	D	L	GF	GA	GD	Pts	Promotion or relegation
1	Visé (C, P)	34	20	11	3	68	30	+38	71	Belgian Second Division
2	Olympic Charleroi	34	17	11	6	59	34	+25	62	Belgian Third Division Final Round
3	Dessel	34	16	10	8	80	49	+31	58	Belgian Third Division Final Round
4	Zaventem	34	17	5	12	62	52	+10	56	
5	URS Centre	34	15	8	11	53	45	+8	53	Belgian Third Division Final Round
6	Diegem	34	14	10	10	50	48	+2	52	
7	Verviers	34	12	12	10	38	47	−9	48	
8	Bocholt	34	12	11	11	64	50	+14	47	
9	Mol Wezel	34	11	12	11	39	37	+2	45	
10	Hasselt	34	11	12	11	45	55	−10	45	
11	Woluwe	34	12	7	15	47	48	−1	43	
12	UR Namur	34	10	13	11	48	43	+5	43	
13	Virton	34	12	6	16	37	44	−7	42	
14	Union Saint-Gilloise	34	10	12	12	53	41	+12	42	
15	Bleid	34	10	10	14	47	57	−10	40	
16	Tongeren	34	10	9	15	44	47	−3	39	Relegation to Promotion play-off
17	Veldwezelt (R)	34	6	8	20	34	60	−26	26	Relegation to Belgian Fourth Division
18	Peruwelz (R)	34	6	3	25	29	110	−81	21	Relegation to Belgian Fourth Division

Source: soccerway.com
Rules for classification: 1) points; 2) number of matches won; if teams are still tied a playoff is organised.
(C) Champions; (P) Promoted; (R) Relegated

== Transfers ==
=== Notable transfers ===
With the shrinking of the Belgian First Division from 18 to 16 teams, only few players of relegated teams were able to stay in first division, with Sulejman Smajić arguably the most important one as he moved from Dender EH to Lokeren. After an impressive season, Bryan Ruiz decided it was time to move as the Costa Rican international signed a contract with Twente and thereby left Gent.

At Standard Liège, Oguchi Onyewu moved on a free transfer to AC Milan. To replace him, four Portuguese speaking players were signed, with Ricardo Rocha from Tottenham Hotspur being most known. Club Brugge made some impressive signings as they bought Belgian international Carl Hoefkens together with striker Ivan Perišić who had just helped Roeselare to avoid relegation. Under influence of Dutch coach Adrie Koster, central defender Ryan Donk was also signed.

Most noted signing for Anderlecht was Ondřej Mazuch from Fiorentina. Mouscron was noticed for signing several unknown players from France, Italy and especially Spain, mostly coming from teams in third and fourth division. A few minutes before the deadline, Cercle Brugge and Genk finished negotiations as they formed a deal which meant Thomas Buffel moved from Cercle Brugge to Genk with Hans Cornelis making the opposite move. On top of that Jelle Vossen was loaned out by Genk for a season to Cercle Brugge.

During the first half of the season, Standard signed former French international Olivier Dacourt to replace the injured Steven Defour.

In the winter period, the bankruptcy of Mouscron caused all their players to be contacted by several teams as they were all free to sign new contracts. Club Brugge managed to sign youngsters Maxime Lestienne and Daan van Gijseghem although there was a lot of interest by many clubs, especially for Lestienne. Standard bought Belgian internationals Sébastien Pocognoli and Koen Daerden, while Anderlecht signed a player from fifth division named Paul Taylor and then loaned him to Charleroi. Also returning Belgian internationals were Luigi Pieroni, the 2003–04 Belgian League top scorer, who signed for Gent and Peter Van Der Heyden who signed for Club Brugge.

== European Club results ==
Note that the Belgian team's score is always given first.

Champions Standard Liège were directly qualified for the Champions League while Anderlecht had to start in the qualification rounds. Starting in the new UEFA Europa League were Club Brugge, Gent and Genk.

The Belgian teams had one of their best seasons of the final decade as both Anderlecht, Club Brugge and Standard were not eliminated before winter and played on far into 2010:

- Standard was drawn in a Champions League group with Arsenal, Olympiakos and AZ and started very strong, leading 2–0 versus Arsenal in their first match. However they lost 2–3 and eventually only scored 4 points before the last match at home versus AZ, where they needed a draw not to be eliminated. Goalkeeper Sinan Bolat scored the equalizer five minutes into extra time causing the stadium to burst into joy as Standard moved on into the Europa League knockout stages to meet Austrian team Red Bull Salzburg. After going down 0–2 in the first leg after twenty minutes it did not look good, however they came back to win 3–2 with a stunning goal by Igor de Camargo. In Athens, they beat Panathinaikos 1–3, meaning that the second leg home victory was not even needed. In the quarter-finals, they dropped out of the competition to Hamburg. Mladen Petrić ruined all hope of progressing when he scored a second away goal for Hamburg in Liège in the second leg, causing Standard to lose both matches.
- Anderlecht started promising with a 5–0 victory versus Turkish unknowns Sivasspor but then failed to progress past the final qualifying stage of the Champions League as they were beaten by Lyon. They thus dropped into the Europa League group stage. In this group stage they played decent scoring 8 out of 12 points which eventually meant they needed just a draw away to Ajax to qualify. With Ajax already qualified, many spectators feared a 0–0 draw. However youngster Romelu Lukaku quickly put Anderlecht up 0–2 as Anderlecht overpowered Ajax. The match ended 1–3, meaning Anderlecht even won the group. Athletic Bilbao was held to a 1–1 draw in Spain before they were beaten 4–0 in Belgium in the knockout stages. Jonathan Legear scoring the 4–0 with a beauty from at least 25 meters. After this Anderlecht fell to Hamburg, the 4–3 victory in Anderlecht not being enough after the 3–1 loss in Hamburg.
- Club Brugge started rather weak in the Europa League qualifying rounds, squeezing past Finland's Lahti with a last-minute goal in Bruges and then needed penalty kicks to get past Poland's Lech Poznan. In the group stage they faced Shakhtar Donetsk, Toulouse and Partizan Belgrade. After a 1–4 home loss to Shakhtar Donetsk it looked dull, but hopes were back up as they scored a last minute equalizer in Toulouse through Perisic. Joseph Akpala had scored a stunning beauty earlier in the match, kicking the ball into the goal from about 25 meters. Two victories versus Partizan and a 0–0 draw versus Shakthar in Ukraine caused them just to need a draw in their last match at home versus Toulouse. Being the better team throughout the match but not being able to score it looked like a 0–0 was going to be the final score, however again Ivan Perisic gave the fans something to cheer about as he scored the 1–0 winning goal in the final few minutes. Club Brugge thus progressed to the knockout stage where they were massive underdogs versus Valencia. However, after a 1–0 win at home they believed they could go through. In Valencia it also ended 1–0 after 90 minutes, however in the extra-time Valencia managed to score two more. Goalkeeper Stijn Stijnen was praised by players and supporters of both teams for his outstanding performance as Valencia had created dozens of chances throughout both matches.
- In the Europa League qualifying rounds, Genk and Gent also took part: Genk lost twice to Lille, while Gent struggled to get past Naftan from Belarus, before getting clobbered 1–7 at home to AS Roma.

Date	Team	Competition	Round	Leg	Opponent	Location	Score
16 July 2009	Gent	Europa League	Qual. Round 2	Leg 1, Away	(Belarus) Naftan	Atlant Stadium, Navapolatsk	1–2
23 July 2009	Gent	Europa League	Qual. Round 2	Leg 2, Home	(Belarus) Naftan	Jules Ottenstadion, Ghent	1–0
28 July 2009	Anderlecht	Champions League	Qual. Round 3	Leg 1, Home	(Turkey) Sivasspor	Constant Vanden Stock Stadium, Anderlecht	5–0
30 July 2009	Club Brugge	Europa League	Qual. Round 3	Leg 1, Home	(Finland) Lahti	Jan Breydel Stadium, Bruges	3–2
30 July 2009	Gent	Europa League	Qual. Round 3	Leg 1, Away	(Italy) Roma	Stadio Olimpico, Rome	1–3
5 August 2009	Anderlecht	Champions League	Qual. Round 3	Leg 2, Away	(Turkey) Sivasspor	Sivas 4 Eylül Stadium, Sivas	1–3
6 August 2009	Club Brugge	Europa League	Qual. Round 3	Leg 2, Away	(Finland) Lahti	Lahden Stadion, Lahti	1–1
6 August 2009	Gent	Europa League	Qual. Round 3	Leg 2, Home	(Italy) Roma	Jules Ottenstadion, Ghent	1–7
19 August 2009	Anderlecht	Champions League	Play-off Round	Leg 1, Away	(France) Lyon	Stade de Gerland, Lyon	1–5
20 August 2009	Club Brugge	Europa League	Play-off Round	Leg 1, Away	(Poland) Lech Poznań	Stadion Miejski, Poznań	0–1
20 August 2009	Genk	Europa League	Play-off Round	Leg 1, Home	(France) Lille	Fenix Stadion, Genk	1–2
25 August 2009	Anderlecht	Champions League	Play-off Round	Leg 2, Home	(France) Lyon	Constant Vanden Stock Stadium, Anderlecht	1–3
27 August 2009	Club Brugge	Europa League	Play-off Round	Leg 2, Home	(Poland) Lech Poznań	Jan Breydel Stadium, Bruges	1–0
27 August 2009	Genk	Europa League	Play-off Round	Leg 2, Away	(France) Lille	Stadium Lille-Metropole, Villeneuve d'Ascq	2–4
16 September 2009	Standard Liège	Champions League	Group stage	Matchday 1, Home	(England) Arsenal	Stade Maurice Dufrasne, Liège	2–3
17 September 2009	Anderlecht	Europa League	Group stage	Matchday 1, Away	(Croatia) Dinamo Zagreb	Maksimir Stadium, Zagreb	2–0
17 September 2009	Club Brugge	Europa League	Group stage	Matchday 1, Home	(Ukraine) Shakhtar Donetsk	Jan Breydel Stadium, Bruges	1–4
29 September 2009	Standard Liège	Champions League	Group stage	Matchday 2, Away	(Netherlands) AZ	DSB Stadion, Alkmaar	1–1
1 October 2009	Anderlecht	Europa League	Group stage	Matchday 2, Home	(Netherlands) Ajax	Constant Vanden Stock Stadium, Anderlecht	1–1
1 October 2009	Club Brugge	Europa League	Group stage	Matchday 2, Away	(France) Toulouse	Stadium Municipal, Toulouse	2–2
20 October 2009	Standard Liège	Champions League	Group stage	Matchday 3, Away	(Greece) Olympiacos	Karaiskakis Stadium, Piraeus	1–2
22 October 2009	Anderlecht	Europa League	Group stage	Matchday 3, Away	(Romania) Timișoara	Stadionul Dan Păltinişanu, Timișoara	0–0
22 October 2009	Club Brugge	Europa League	Group stage	Matchday 3, Home	(Serbia) Partizan Belgrade	Jan Breydel Stadium, Bruges	2–0
4 November 2009	Standard Liège	Champions League	Group stage	Matchday 4, Home	(Greece) Olympiacos	Stade Maurice Dufrasne, Liège	2–0
5 November 2009	Anderlecht	Europa League	Group stage	Matchday 4, Home	(Romania) Timișoara	Constant Vanden Stock Stadium, Anderlecht	3–1
5 November 2009	Club Brugge	Europa League	Group stage	Matchday 4, Away	(Serbia) Partizan Belgrade	Partizan Stadium, Belgrade	4–2
24 November 2009	Standard Liège	Champions League	Group stage	Matchday 5, Away	(England) Arsenal	Emirates Stadium, Holloway	0–2
2 December 2009	Anderlecht	Europa League	Group stage	Matchday 5, Home	(Croatia) Dinamo Zagreb	Constant Vanden Stock Stadium, Anderlecht	0–1
3 December 2009	Club Brugge	Europa League	Group stage	Matchday 5, Away	(Ukraine) Shakhtar Donetsk	Donbas Arena, Donetsk	0–0
9 December 2009	Standard Liège	Champions League	Group stage	Matchday 6, Home	(Netherlands) AZ	Stade Maurice Dufrasne, Liège	1–1
16 December 2009	Club Brugge	Europa League	Group stage	Matchday 6, Home	(France) Toulouse	Jan Breydel Stadium, Bruges	1–0
17 December 2009	Anderlecht	Europa League	Group stage	Matchday 6, Away	(Netherlands) Ajax	Amsterdam Arena, Amsterdam	3–1
18 February 2010	Anderlecht	Europa League	Round of 32	Leg 1, Away	(Spain) Athletic Bilbao	San Mamés Stadium, Bilbao	1–1
18 February 2010	Club Brugge	Europa League	Round of 32	Leg 1, Home	(Spain) Valencia	Jan Breydel Stadium, Bruges	1–0
18 February 2010	Standard Liège	Europa League	Round of 32	Leg 1, Home	(Austria) Salzburg	Stade Maurice Dufrasne, Liège	3–2
25 February 2010	Anderlecht	Europa League	Round of 32	Leg 2, Home	(Spain) Athletic Bilbao	Constant Vanden Stock Stadium, Anderlecht	4–0
25 February 2010	Club Brugge	Europa League	Round of 32	Leg 2, Away	(Spain) Valencia	Estadio Mestalla, Valencia	0–3 (aet)
25 February 2010	Standard Liège	Europa League	Round of 32	Leg 2, Away	(Austria) Salzburg	Red Bull Arena, Salzburg	0–0
11 March 2010	Anderlecht	Europa League	Round of 16	Leg 1, Away	(Germany) Hamburg	HSH Nordbank Arena, Hamburg	1–3
11 March 2010	Standard Liège	Europa League	Round of 16	Leg 1, Away	(Greece) Panathinaikos	Olympic Stadium, Athens	3–1
18 March 2010	Anderlecht	Europa League	Round of 16	Leg 2, Home	(Germany) Hamburg	Constant Vanden Stock Stadium, Anderlecht	4–3
18 March 2010	Standard Liège	Europa League	Round of 16	Leg 2, Home	(Greece) Panathinaikos	Stade Maurice Dufrasne, Liège	1–0
1 April 2010	Standard Liège	Europa League	Quarter-finals	Leg 1, Away	(Germany) Hamburg	HSH Nordbank Arena, Hamburg	1–2
8 April 2010	Standard Liège	Europa League	Quarter-finals	Leg 2, Home	(Germany) Hamburg	Stade Maurice Dufrasne, Liège	1–3

== European qualification for 2009–10 summary ==
Competition	Qualifiers	Reason for Qualification
UEFA Champions League Third Qualifying Round for Champions	Anderlecht	1st in Jupiler League
UEFA Champions League Third Qualifying Round for Non-Champions	Gent	2nd in Jupiler League
UEFA Europa League Third Qualifying Round	Club Brugge	3rd in Jupiler League
UEFA Europa League Second Qualifying Round	Genk	Europa League Testmatch winner
UEFA Europa League Play-off Round	Cercle Brugge	Cup finalist

== National teams ==
=== Belgium ===
As interim coach Franky Vercauteren chose to resign after the loss in Armenia, prompting already signed Dick Advocaat to start already, although his contract started only on 1 January 2010. Advocaat however simply resigned in April 2010 to sign a new contract at Russia where he could earn a lot more. The Royal Belgian Football Association reacted disappointed and angry at the same time, whereas Advocaat claimed he "did not feel guilty at all". On May 11, Georges Leekens was appointed the new coach, who had already managed the 'Red Devils' between 1997 and 1999.

==== Friendly matches ====
12 August 2009

Czech Republic	3 – 1	Belgium
Hubník 27'; Baroš 42' (pen.); Rozehnal 79'		Vertonghen 11'

Na Stínadlech, Teplice, Czech Republic

14 November 2009

Belgium	3 – 0	Hungary
Fellaini 37'; Vermaelen 55'; Mirallas 61'	Report

Jules Ottenstadion, Ghent, Belgium
Referee: (France) Hervé Piccirillo

17 November 2009

Belgium	2 – 0	Qatar
Witsel 21'; Sonck 54'	Report

Stade Louis Dugauguez, Sedan, France

3 March 2010

Belgium	0 – 1	Croatia
		Kranjčar 63'

King Baudouin Stadium, Brussels, Belgium

19 May 2010

Belgium	2 – 1	Bulgaria
Lepoint 89'; Kompany 90+1'		Popov 31'

King Baudouin Stadium, Brussels, Belgium

==== World Cup qualifiers ====
Belgium was in qualifying Group 5 for the 2010 FIFA World Cup but did not manage to qualify.

5 September 2009
22:00 UTC+2

Spain	5 – 0	Belgium
Silva 41', 67'; Villa 49', 85'; Piqué 50'	Report

Estadio Riazor, A Coruña
Attendance: 30,441
Referee: (France) Bertrand Layec

9 September 2009
21:00 UTC+5

Armenia	2 – 1	Belgium
Goharyan 23'; Hovsepyan 50'	Report	Van Buyten 90+2'

Hanrapetakan Stadium, Yerevan
Attendance: 2,300
Referee: (North Macedonia) Ljubomir Krstevski

10 October 2009
20:45 UTC+2

Belgium	2 – 0	Turkey
Mpenza 8', 84'	Report

King Baudouin Stadium, Brussels
Attendance: 30,131
Referee: (Italy) Matteo Trefoloni

14 October 2009
21:30 UTC+3

Estonia	2 – 0	Belgium
Piiroja 30'; Vassiljev 67'	Report

A. Le Coq Arena, Tallinn
Attendance: 4,680
Referee: (Denmark) Nicolai Vollquartz

=== Belgium U-21 ===
==== Friendly match ====
12 August 2009

Belgium	0 – 0	Finland

Marcel De Kerpelstadion, Wetteren, Belgium

==== U-21 Championship qualifiers ====
The Belgium under-21 squad is currently in Group 8 of the qualification process for the 2011 UEFA European Under-21 Football Championship.

4 September 2009
18:00 CET

Malta	0 – 1	Belgium
	Report	Kitoko 33'

Ta' Qali National Stadium, Ta' Qali
Referee: (Moldova) Igor Satchi

8 September 2009
20:00 CET

Belgium	2 – 0	Slovenia
Nainggolan 56'; Lukaku 77'	Report

Het Kuipje, Westerlo
Referee: (Finland) Petteri Kari

9 October 2009
19:00 CET

Ukraine	1 – 1	Belgium
Zozulya 69'	Report	Mujangi Bia 67'

Lobanovsky Dynamo Stadium, Kyiv
Referee: (Switzerland) Stephan Studer

13 October 2009
20:50 CET

Belgium	0 – 0	France
	Report

Le Canonnier, Mouscron
Referee: (Germany) Thorsten Kinhöfer

13 November 2009
20:00 CET

Belgium	0 – 2	Ukraine
	Report	Holodyuk 36', 73'

Staaien, Sint-Truiden
Referee: (England) Stuart Atwell

3 March 2010
TBD CET

Belgium	1 – 0	Malta
Kums 74' (pen.)

Daknamstadion, Lokeren, Belgium
Referee: (Austria) Rene Eisner

This leaves two matches, away to Slovenia and away to France to be played in the next season.

=== Belgium U-19 ===
==== Friendly matches ====
17 August 2009
19:00 CET

Belgium	1 – 0	Montenegro
Angeli 32'

Stade Luc Varenne, Tournai, Belgium
Attendance: about 250

19 August 2009
19:00 CET

Belgium	2 – 0	Montenegro
Bourdouxhe 77' (pen.); Buyse 85'

Schiervelde Stadion, Roeselare, Belgium
Attendance: about 200

5 September 2009
19:00 CET

Belgium	1 – 2	Germany
Schneider 65' (o.g.)		Kroos 36'; Bertram 59'

Kehrweg Stadion, Eupen, Belgium
Attendance: about 250

7 September 2009
19:00 CET

Belgium	0 – 1	Germany
		Sobiech 34'

Stade Jacques Lechat, Malmedy, Belgium
Attendance: about 400

12 October 2009
19:00 CET

Belgium	1 – 0	France
Kabasele 5'

Freethiel Stadion, Beveren, Belgium
Attendance: about 200

14 October 2009
19:00 CET

Belgium	1 – 2	France
Bruno 59' (pen.)		Bakambu 5'; Salibur 90'

Puyenbeke Stadion, Sint-Niklaas, Belgium
Attendance: about 100

2 March 2010

Belgium	1 – 3	Denmark
Fileccia 43'		17'; 79'; 82'

Kehrweg Stadion, Eupen, Belgium
Attendance: about 250

4 March 2010

Belgium	2 – 0	Denmark
Mertens 14'; Bruno 74'

Stade Communal de Bielmont, Verviers, Belgium
Attendance: about 200

20 April 2010

Luxembourg	2 – 4	Belgium

==== U-19 Championship qualifiers ====
The Belgium under-19 squad managed to qualify for the elite round qualification process for the 2010 UEFA European Under-19 Football Championship after successfully passing through the first stage of qualifying. However they did not manage to qualify for the tournament proper as they ended second to Croatia in group 1.

13 November 2009

Belgium	4 – 0	Andorra
De Bruyne 43'; Bruno 59'; Bourdouxhe 72' (pen.); Longueville 88'	Report

Gemeentelijk Stadion, Hamme
Referee: (Georgia (country)) Lasha Silagava

15 November 2009

Kazakhstan	0 – 4	Belgium
	Report	Kabasele 10', 62'; Bruno 57', 67' (pen.)

Freethiel Stadion, Beveren
Referee: (Croatia) Ante Vucemilovic-Simunovic

18 November 2009

Belgium	2 – 4	Norway
Badibanga 72'; Durwael 85'	Report	Longueville 45+1' (o.g.); Johansen 54'; King 58' (pen.), 90'

Puyenbeke Stadion, Sint-Niklaas
Referee: (Poland) Pawel Gil

19 May 2010
14:30 CET

Croatia	2 – 1	Belgium
Maglica 45+3'; Ozobić 68'	Report	50' Van Eenoo

Stadium Lučko, Lučko
Referee: Marcin Szulc (POL)

21 May 2010
17:00 CET

Belgium	2 – 1	Scotland
Badibanga 69'; Sterckx 90+2'	Report	87' Inman

Gradski stadion, Vrbovec
Referee: Artur Soares Dias (POR)

24 May 2010
17:00 CET

Montenegro	1 – 4	Belgium
Van Damme 32' (o.g.)	Report	Van Damme 9'; Lestienne 16'; Badibanga 28'; Bruno 73'

ŠRC Velika Gorica, Velika Gorica
Referee: Marcin Szulc (POL)

=== Women ===
==== Friendly matches ====
5 September 2009
15:00 CET

Romania	2 – 7	Belgium
5'; 85' (pen.)		Callebaut 35'; Zeler 43', 63', 65'; Van De Goor 60'; Verelst 73'; Onzia 80'

Stadionul Poiana, Câmpina, Romania
Attendance: about 50

7 September 2009
11:00 CET

Romania	4 – 3	Belgium
5'; 20'; 35'; 52'		De Rammelaere 82', 89', 90'

Stadionul Poiana, Câmpina, Romania
Attendance: about 50

6 June 2010
16:00 CET

Belgium	0 – 2	Netherlands
		Van Den Heiligenberg 51'; Smit 66' (pen.)

Loenhout, Belgium
Attendance: about 500

13 June 2010

Netherlands	4 – 1	Belgium
Dekker; Pieete; Hoogendijk; Slegers		Elsen

==== World Cup qualifiers ====
Belgium was in qualifying Group 8 for the 2011 FIFA Women's World Cup, but failed to qualify.

20 September 2009
15:00 UTC+1

Wales	0 – 1	Belgium
	Report	Verelst 90+4'

Bridge Meadow Stadium, Haverfordwest
Referee: (Norway) Ann Helen Østervold

23 September 2009
18:00 UTC+2

Sweden	2 – 1	Belgium
Asllani 30'; Landström 66'	Report	Maes 68'

Gamla Ullevi, Gothenburg
Referee: (Switzerland) Esther Staubli

28 October 2009
20:00 UTC+1

Belgium	1 – 4	Sweden
Maes 71'	Report	Seger 23', 65'; Landström 67'; Lindén 86'

Den Dreef, Heverlee
Referee: (Greece) Efthalia Mitsi

22 November 2009
14:00 UTC+4

Azerbaijan	0 – 0	Belgium
	Report

Ismet Qaibov Stadium, Baku
Referee: (Serbia) Gordana Kuzmanović

26 November 2009
14:00 UTC+1

Czech Republic	1 – 2	Belgium
Pivoňková 69'	Report	Verelst 24'; Maes 27'

Městský sportovní areál, Písek
Referee: (Kazakhstan) Yuliya Medvedeva-Keldyusheva

28 March 2010
16:00 UTC+2

Belgium	2 – 3	Wales
Philtjens 64'; Zeler 72'	Report	Dykes 19'; Daley 42' (pen.); Jones 90+1'

Edmond Machtens Stadium, Brussels
Referee: (Spain) Elia María Martínez Martínez

1 April 2010
20:00 UTC+2

Belgium	0 – 3	Czech Republic
	Report	Divišová 29', 44', 49'

Edmond Machtens Stadium, Brussels
Referee: Natalia Aleksakhina (Ukraine)

19 June 2010
17:00 UTC+2

Belgium	11 – 0	Azerbaijan
De Cock 3', 11', 40', 42'; Philtjens 10', 26'; Heiremans 18', 54'; Onzia 35', 90+1'; Puttemans 89'	Report

Stade Leburton, Tubize
Referee: Eun Ah Hong (South Korea)

== See also ==
- 2009–10 Belgian First Division
- 2009–10 Belgian Cup
- 2010 Belgian Super Cup
- Belgian Second Division
- Belgian Third Division: divisions A and B
- Belgian Promotion: divisions A, B, C and D
