= 2003–04 Belgian First Division =

101st season of top-tier football in Belgium

Belgian First Division
- Season: 2003–04
- Champions: Anderlecht
- Relegated: Heusden-Zolder; Antwerp
- Champions League: Anderlecht; Club Brugge
- UEFA Cup: Standard Liège; Beveren
- Matches: 306
- Goals: 824 (2.69 per match)
- Top goalscorer: Luigi Pieroni (28 goals)

The 2003–04 season of the Belgian First Division was held between 8 August 2003 and 15 May 2004. Sporting Anderlecht became champions on 24 April 2004.

== Promoted teams ==
Location of teams in Belgian First Division 2003–04

These teams were promoted from the second division at the start of the season:

- Cercle Brugge K.S.V. (second division champions)
- K. Heusden-Zolder (playoff winner)

== Relegated teams ==
These teams were relegated to the second division at the end of the season:

- K. Heusden-Zolder
- R. Antwerp F.C.

== Anderlecht's title success ==
The battle for the title was not great as Anderlecht had a big lead over their opponents (mainly Club Brugge). However, a bad finish from Anderlecht kept the suspense until the 31st matchday when Club Brugge drew with Mouscron while the team from Brussels also drew (1-1) at Herman Vanderpoortenstadion, the homeground of Lierse.

== Battle for Europe ==
The next week, Club Brugge was sure to enter the UEFA Champions League Preliminary Round with a 1-0 win against Standard Liège, then lying third. In spite of this defeat, Standard managed to qualify for the UEFA Cup as they were 6 points ahead of Mouscron after the 32nd matchday. The suspense was killed after a 1-1 draw against Charleroi the next Saturday.

== The relegation dog fight ==
The end of the league was thus centered on the battle against relegation. Four teams were concerned : R.A.E.C. Mons and Charleroi, which finally saved themselves, R. Antwerp F.C. and K. Beringen-Heusden-Zolder finishing respectively 6 and 5 points adrift.

== Final league table ==
Pos	Team	Pld	W	D	L	GF	GA	GD	Pts	Qualification or relegation
1	Anderlecht (C)	34	25	6	3	77	27	+50	81	Qualification to Champions League third qualifying round
2	Club Brugge	34	22	6	6	77	31	+46	72	Qualification to Champions League second qualifying round
3	Standard Liège	34	18	11	5	68	31	+37	65	Qualification to UEFA Cup first round
4	Genk	34	17	8	9	58	40	+18	59	Qualification to Intertoto Cup second round
5	Mouscron	34	15	14	5	64	42	+22	59	
6	Westerlo	34	14	10	10	51	45	+6	52	Qualification to Intertoto Cup second round
7	Germinal Beerschot	34	11	11	12	34	40	−6	44	
8	La Louvière	34	10	14	10	45	46	−1	44	
9	Gent	34	8	16	10	33	34	−1	40	Qualification to Intertoto Cup first round
10	Sporting Lokeren	34	10	9	15	45	54	−9	39	
11	Lierse	34	8	15	11	33	40	−7	39	
12	Beveren	34	11	5	18	45	58	−13	38	Qualification to UEFA Cup second qualifying round
13	Sint-Truiden	34	9	11	14	36	50	−14	38	
14	Cercle Brugge	34	7	14	13	28	52	−24	35	
15	Charleroi	34	8	9	17	35	47	−12	33	
16	Mons	34	7	12	15	29	52	−23	33	
17	Heusden-Zolder (R)	34	7	7	20	36	68	−32	28	Relegation to 2004–05 Belgian Second Division
18	Antwerp (R)	34	7	6	21	30	67	−37	27	Relegation to 2004–05 Belgian Second Division

(C) Champions; (R) Relegated

== Results ==
Home \ Away	AND	ANT	GBA	BEV	CER	CLU	CHA	GNK	GNT	HZO	LIE	LOK	LOU	MON	MOU	STT	STA	WES
Anderlecht		3–1	4–0	1–0	3–2	1–1	3–2	2–1	2–0	6–0	2–1	2–1	1–1	4–1	0–0	3–0	1–4	5–1
Antwerp	0–2		0–4	0–3	2–2	0–4	3–1	3–1	0–1	1–1	3–1	0–3	1–3	0–0	3–1	1–2	0–4	2–1
Germinal Beerschot	1–0	1–0		2–1	2–1	2–0	3–1	2–2	0–2	1–3	1–1	2–1	0–0	1–0	2–2	0–0	1–2	0–2
Beveren	2–3	5–2	0–0		1–1	1–3	1–0	3–1	2–4	2–0	0–1	1–1	1–0	2–0	0–3	1–4	0–2	0–3
Cercle Brugge	0–2	1–2	1–0	0–4		0–2	3–2	0–0	1–0	2–3	0–0	2–2	2–1	0–1	1–1	2–1	2–0	0–0
Club Brugge	1–0	4–0	2–1	3–0	5–0		1–0	1–0	1–1	3–0	3–0	2–1	3–3	2–0	4–2	2–1	1–0	4–0
Charleroi	0–1	0–1	0–1	0–1	0–0	1–1		4–3	2–0	2–1	0–1	1–2	2–2	1–0	1–0	1–1	0–1	3–1
Genk	0–1	3–1	1–1	1–0	3–1	1–0	2–0		1–0	4–1	2–0	3–1	1–1	0–0	2–0	4–0	1–1	1–0
Gent	1–3	1–1	1–1	2–1	1–1	0–1	1–1	1–1		2–0	1–1	1–1	3–0	0–0	0–0	0–1	0–0	0–2
Heusden-Zolder	2–4	0–0	2–0	1–4	0–0	4–2	3–1	2–3	1–1		0–0	2–3	1–3	2–0	1–1	0–1	1–1	0–1
Lierse	1–1	1–0	0–0	1–0	0–0	1–1	1–1	3–5	0–0	4–0		2–1	1–1	0–2	2–2	1–1	0–1	0–1
Lokeren	0–6	3–0	0–1	1–2	0–2	2–0	0–2	2–1	1–1	3–0	2–0		3–0	0–0	1–1	0–0	1–1	1–3
La Louvière	1–4	1–1	0–0	3–2	2–0	0–4	0–0	5–2	2–2	2–0	0–1	3–2		1–1	1–2	0–0	3–2	1–1
Mons	0–2	1–0	3–0	2–2	0–0	0–9	2–2	0–1	0–1	1–2	1–3	1–1	1–0		3–3	3–4	1–1	0–0
Mouscron	0–1	2–0	3–2	5–0	4–0	1–1	3–0	3–1	2–1	2–1	1–1	3–0	2–1	3–2		2–1	2–2	3–2
Sint-Truiden	1–3	2–1	0–0	1–1	0–0	3–2	1–2	0–3	0–2	2–1	3–2	1–2	1–2	1–2	1–1		1–2	0–0
Standard Liège	1–1	3–0	2–1	4–0	7–0	3–1	1–1	0–2	2–0	4–1	1–1	1–0	0–2	4–0	3–3	1–1		3–0
Westerlo	0–0	2–1	3–1	3–2	1–1	2–3	2–1	1–1	2–2	2–0	2–1	7–3	0–0	0–1	1–1	3–0	2–4	

Legend: Blue = home team win; Yellow = draw; Red = away team win.

== Top goal scorers ==
Scorer	Goals	Team
(Belgium) Luigi Pieroni	28	Mouscron
(Belgium) Émile Mpenza	21	Standard Liège
(Nigeria) Tosin Dosunmu	16	Westerlo
(Ivory Coast) Aruna Dindane	15	Anderlecht
(Belgium) Gert Verheyen	15	Club Brugge
(Peru) Andrés Mendoza	14	Club Brugge
(Belgium) Cédric Roussel	14	Racing Genk

== Attendances ==
No.	Club	Average attendance	Change	Highest
1	Anderlecht	24,160	2,1%	26,311
2	Club Brugge	23,716	13,1%	27,900
3	Genk	23,627	-0,9%	25,061
4	Standard de Liège	16,888	14,5%	26,000
5	Charleroi	9,083	-9,0%	17,000
6	Gent	8,355	-4,3%	10,500
7	Mouscron	7,711	-5,8%	10,654
8	STVV	7,665	-3,1%	11,000
9	Germinal Beerschot	7,429	-1,8%	11,000
10	Lierse	7,253	-12,2%	11,250
11	Antwerp	6,735	-6,1%	13,000
12	Sporting Lokeren	5,570	-10,4%	7,000
13	Westerlo	5,282	-6,0%	10,000
14	Heusden-Zolder	5,105	153,9%	9,270
15	Cercle Brugge	5,103	103,6%	13,550
16	Beveren	4,941	9,4%	8,000
17	RAEC	4,582	-25,5%	7,000
18	RAAL	4,300	-17,0%	7,000

== See also ==
- 2003–04 in Belgian football
