= 1972–73 in Belgian football =

Football in Belgium
- Season: 1972–73

The 1972–73 season was the 70th season of competitive football in Belgium. Club Brugge KV won their second Division I title, 53 years after their first title in 1919–20. RSC Anderlechtois won the Belgian Cup against Standard Club Liégeois (2-1). The Belgium national football team continued their 1974 FIFA World Cup qualification campaign with a win in Norway and a draw at home against the Netherlands. The Belgian Women's First Division was won for the second time by Astrio Begijnendijk.

== Overview ==
Belgium continued their qualifying campaign for the 1974 FIFA World Cup with a win over Norway and a draw against the Netherlands. At the end of the season, Belgium was first of Group 3 with 7 points in 4 matches, ahead of the Netherlands (3 points in 2 matches), Norway (2 points in 3 matches) and Iceland (0 points in 3 matches).

At the end of the season, RU Saint-Gilloise and R Crossing Club de Schaerbeek were relegated to Division II, to be replaced by SK Beveren-Waas and KSV Waregem from Division II.
The bottom 2 clubs in Division II (R Tilleur FC and RAA Louviéroise) were relegated to Division III, to be replaced by K Olse Merksem SC and ASV Oostende KM from Division III.
The bottom club of each Division III league (RFC Sérésien, R Herve FC, FC Vigor Wuitens Hamme and RRC Gent) were relegated to Promotion, to be replaced by AS Herstalienne, KFC Eendracht Zele, K Alt-Hoeselt VV and FC Denderleeuw from Promotion.

== National team ==
Date	Venue	Opponents	Score	Comp	Belgium scorers
October 4, 1972	Ullevaal Stadion, Oslo (A)	Norway	2-0	WCQ	Léon Dolmans, Raoul Lambert
November 19, 1972	Bosuilstadion, Antwerp (H)	Netherlands	0-0	WCQ	
April 18, 1973	Olympisch Stadion, Antwerp (H)	East Germany	3-0	F	Raoul Lambert (2), Jean Dockx

Key

- H = Home match
- A = Away match
- N = On neutral ground
- F = Friendly
- WCQ = World Cup qualification
- o.g. = own goal

== European competitions ==
RSC Anderlechtois beat Vejle Boldklub of Denmark in the first round of the 1972–73 European Champion Clubs' Cup (won 4–2 at home, 3–0 away) but lost in the second round to FC Spartak Trnava of Czechoslovakia (lost both legs 0-1).

Standard Club Liégeois entered the 1972–73 European Cup Winners' Cup as Cup finalist, since the Cup winner RSC Anderlechtois was also qualified for the Champion Clubs' Cup. They were defeated in the first round by Sparta Prague of Czechoslovakia (won 1–0 at home, lost 2–4 away).

Only 2 Belgian clubs were invited to the 1972–73 UEFA Cup: Club Brugge KV and RR White.
Club Brugge KV reached the second round by eliminating Åtvidabergs FF of Sweden (won 5–3 away, lost 1–2 at home) but RR White lost to Grupo Desportivo Cuf of Portugal in the first round (lost 0–1 at home, 0–2 away).
In the second round, Club Brugge KV lost to FC Porto of Portugal (lost 0–3 away, won 3–2 at home).

== Honours ==
Competition	Winner
Division I	Club Brugge KV
Cup	RSC Anderlechtois
Women Division I	Astrio Begijnendijk
Division II	SK Beveren-Waas
Division III	K Olse Merksem SC and ASV Oostende KM
Promotion	AS Herstalienne, KFC Eendracht Zele, K Alt-Hoeselt VV and FC Denderleeuw

== Final league tables ==
=== Division I ===
- 1972-73 Top scorer: Dutchman Rob Rensenbrink (RSC Anderlechtois) and Austrian Alfred Riedl (K Sint-Truidense VV) with 16 goals
- 1970 Golden Shoe: Christian Piot (Standard Club Liégeois)

=== Division II ===
- Top scorer: Hans Posthumus (KRC Mechelen) with 22 goals
