= 2003–04 in Belgian football =

Football in Belgium
- Season: 2003–04

The 2003–04 season was the 101st competitive season in Belgian football.

== National team ==
Belgium ended their qualifying campaign for the 2004 UEFA European Championship at the third place in Group 8 and thus did not take part to the final tournament.

Date	Venue	Opponents	Score*	Comp	Belgium scorers	Match Report
20 August 2003	King Baudouin Stadium, Brussels (H)	Netherlands	1–1	F	Wesley Sonck	
10 September 2003	King Baudouin Stadium, Brussels (H)	Croatia	2–1	ECQ	Wesley Sonck (2)	
11 October 2003	Stade Maurice Dufrasne, Liège (H)	Estonia	2–0	ECQ	Raio Piiroja (og), Thomas Buffel	
18 February 2004	King Baudouin Stadium, Brussels (H)	France	0–2	F		
31 March 2004	RheinEnergieStadion, Köln (A)	Germany	0–3	F		
28 April 2004	King Baudouin Stadium, Brussels (H)	Turkey	2–3	F	Wesley Sonck, Grégory Dufer	
29 May 2004	Philips Stadion, Eindhoven (A)	Netherlands	1–0	F	Bart Goor	

* Belgium score given first

Key

- H = Home match
- A = Away match
- F = Friendly
- ECQ = UEFA European Championship 2004 Qualifying, Group 8
- og = own goal

== Honours ==
Competition	Winner
Jupiler League	R.S.C. Anderlecht
Cup	Club Brugge
Supercup	Club Brugge
Second division	Brussels
Third division A	Waasland
Third division B	Union

== Final tables ==
=== Jupiler League ===
Pos	Team	Pld	W	D	L	GF	GA	GD	Pts	Qualification or relegation
1	Anderlecht (C)	34	25	6	3	77	27	+50	81	Qualification to Champions League third qualifying round
2	Club Brugge	34	22	6	6	77	31	+46	72	Qualification to Champions League second qualifying round
3	Standard Liège	34	18	11	5	68	31	+37	65	Qualification to UEFA Cup first round
4	Genk	34	17	8	9	58	40	+18	59	Qualification to Intertoto Cup second round
5	Mouscron	34	15	14	5	64	42	+22	59	
6	Westerlo	34	14	10	10	51	45	+6	52	Qualification to Intertoto Cup second round
7	Germinal Beerschot	34	11	11	12	34	40	−6	44	
8	La Louvière	34	10	14	10	45	46	−1	44	
9	Gent	34	8	16	10	33	34	−1	40	Qualification to Intertoto Cup first round
10	Sporting Lokeren	34	10	9	15	45	54	−9	39	
11	Lierse	34	8	15	11	33	40	−7	39	
12	Beveren	34	11	5	18	45	58	−13	38	Qualification to UEFA Cup second qualifying round
13	Sint-Truiden	34	9	11	14	36	50	−14	38	
14	Cercle Brugge	34	7	14	13	28	52	−24	35	
15	Charleroi	34	8	9	17	35	47	−12	33	
16	Mons	34	7	12	15	29	52	−23	33	
17	Heusden-Zolder (R)	34	7	7	20	36	68	−32	28	Relegation to 2004–05 Belgian Second Division
18	Antwerp (R)	34	7	6	21	30	67	−37	27	Relegation to 2004–05 Belgian Second Division

(C) Champions; (R) Relegated

=== Second division ===
Pos	Team	Pld	W	D	L	GF	GA	GD	Pts
1	Brussels (C)	34	21	7	6	79	29	+50	70
2	Oostende (P)	34	18	11	5	69	43	+26	65
3	Roeselare	34	19	6	9	59	38	+21	63
4	Tubize	34	15	13	6	60	33	+27	58
5	Zulte-Waregem	34	15	7	12	58	45	+13	52
6	Virton	34	13	12	9	38	33	+5	51
7	Deinze	34	15	5	14	45	46	−1	50
8	Maasmechelen	34	13	10	11	47	50	−3	49
9	Dessel	34	14	6	14	41	42	−1	48
10	Geel	34	13	8	13	38	41	−3	47
11	Hamme	34	11	13	10	43	44	−1	46
12	Aalst	34	12	9	13	54	59	−5	45
13	Visé	34	13	5	16	48	59	−11	44
14	Eupen	34	8	13	13	32	41	−9	37
15	Ronse	34	7	11	16	27	46	−19	32
16	Sporting West (R)	34	7	10	17	41	61	−20	31
17	Tienen (R)	34	6	7	21	30	64	−34	25
18	Denderleeuw (R)	34	3	13	18	32	67	−35	22

(C) Champions; (P) Promoted; (R) Relegated

== See also ==
- Belgian First Division 2003-04
- 2003 Belgian Super Cup
- Belgian Second Division
- Belgian Third Division: divisions A and B
- Belgian Promotion: divisions A, B, C and D
