= 1974–75 in Belgian football =

Football in Belgium
- Season: 1974–75

The 1974–75 season was the 72nd season of competitive football in Belgium. R White Daring Molenbeek won their first Division I title. RSC Anderlechtois won the Belgian Cup against R Antwerp FC (1-0) and they reached the quarter-finals of the 1974–75 European Champion Clubs' Cup. The Belgium national football team started their UEFA Euro 1976 qualifying campaign with wins over Iceland and France and a draw against East Germany. The Belgian Women's First Division was won by Astrio Begijnendijk for the 3rd time. Paul Van Himst won his 4th Belgian Golden Shoe award, which is the current record.

== Overview ==
Belgium was drawn in Group 7 of the UEFA Euro 1976 qualifications with Iceland, France and East Germany. At the end of the season, with 2 wins over Iceland and France and a draw against East Germany, Belgium was at the top of the group with 5 points, ahead of Iceland (4 points in 4 games), East Germany (3 points in 4 games) and France (2 points in 3 games).

At the end of the season, the number of teams in Division I was decreased from 20 to 19, so the bottom 3 teams in Division I (KFC Diest, ROC de Montignies-sur-Sambre and KFC Winterslag) were relegated to Division II, to be replaced by Division II champions KRC Mechelen and the Belgian Second Division final round winner RAA Louviéroise. This time, all 4 teams participating in the final round were Division II teams, based on the period rankings and the final ranking. The tournament was contested by RAA Louviéroise, K Boom FC, KSK Tongeren and VG Oostende.

The bottom 3 teams in Division II (KAS Eupen, Royale Union and R Crossing Club de Schaerbeek) were relegated to Division III, to be replaced by KAA Gent and VV Patro Eisden from Division III.

The bottom 2 clubs of each Division III league (K Puurs EFC, KSK Roeselare, R Stade Waremmien FC and K Helzold FC) were relegated to Promotion, together with FC Denderleeuw who lost a two-legged play-off game against FC Dessel Sport (the two 14th-placed teams).

The winner of each Promotion league (K Hoger Op Merchtem, KSK Bree, RFC Sérésien and RRC Tienen) were promoted to Division III: .

== National team ==
| Date | Venue | Opponents | Score | Comp | Belgium scorers |
|---|---|---|---|---|---|
| September 8, 1974 | Laugardalsvollur, Reykjavík (A) | Iceland | 2-0 | ECQ | Wilfried Van Moer, Jacques Teugels |
| October 12, 1974 | Heysel Stadium, Brussels (H) | France | 2-1 | ECQ | Maurice Martens, François Van der Elst |
| December 7, 1974 | Zentralstadion, Leipzig (A) | East Germany | 0-0 | ECQ | |
| April 30, 1975 | Bosuilstadion, Antwerp (H) | Netherlands | 1-0 | F | Raoul Lambert |

Key

- H = Home match
- A = Away match
- N = On neutral ground
- F = Friendly
- ECQ = European Championship qualification
- o.g. = own goal

== European competitions ==
RSC Anderlechtois beat SK Slovan Bratislava of Czechoslovakia in the first round of the 1974–75 European Champion Clubs' Cup (lost 2-4 away, won 3-1 at home).
In the second round, they eliminated Olympiacos FC of Greece (won 5-1 at home, lost 0-3 away) but lost in the quarter-finals to Leeds United AFC (lost 0-3 away, 0-1 at home).

KSV Waregem lost in the first round of the 1974–75 European Cup Winners' Cup to FK Austria Wien of Austria (won 2-1 at home, lost 1-4 away).

R Antwerp FC (2nd-placed in the championship) and R White Daring Molenbeek (3rd) qualified for the 1974–75 UEFA Cup. In the first round, Antwerp beat SK Sturm Graz of Austria on away goals (lost 1-2 away, won 1-0 at home) and RWDM beat Dundee FC of Scotland (won 1-0 at home, 4-2 away).
Both clubs were eliminated in the second round, Antwerp by AFC Ajax of the Netherlands on away goals (lost 0-1 away, won 2-1 at home) and RWDM by FC Twente of the Netherlands (lost 1-2 away, 0-1 at home).

== Honours ==
| Competition | Winner |
|---|---|
| Division I | R White Daring Molenbeek |
| Cup | RSC Anderlechtois |
| Women Division I | Astrio Begijnendijk |
| Division II | KRC Mechelen |
| Division III | KAA Gent and VV Patro Eisden |
| Promotion | K Hoger Op Merchtem, KSK Bree, RFC Sérésien and RRC Tienen |

== Final league tables ==
=== Division I ===
- 1974-75 Top scorer: Austrian Alfred Riedl (R Antwerp FC) with 28 goals
- 1973 Golden Shoe: Paul Van Himst (RSC Anderlechtois)
