= Belgian Second Division play-offs 2001–10 =

Sports game results

This article gives a summary of results for the Belgian Second Division play-offs from 2001 to 2010.

== 2001 ==
=== Results and table ===
Team	Pts	Pld	W	D	L	GF	GA
R.W.D. Molenbeek	12	6	3	3	0	12	6
K.F.C. Turnhout	8	6	2	2	2	14	10
K.F.C. Verbroedering Geel	7	6	2	1	3	7	13
R.A.E.C. Mons	5	6	1	2	3	6	10

Mons	0 - 1	Geel
Turnhout	2 - 2	RWDM
RWDM	0 - 0	Mons
Geel	1 - 3	Turnhout
Geel	2 - 2	RWDM
Mons	2 - 1	Turnhout

RWDM	3 - 1	Geel
Turnhout	3 - 3	Mons
RWDM	1 - 0	Turnhout
Geel	1 - 0	Mons
Turnhout	5 - 1	Geel
Mons	1 - 4	RWDM

== 2002 ==
=== Qualifiers ===
The following teams qualified for the 2002 play-offs:

- K. Heusden-Zolder as winner of the second period
- K.S.V. Ingelmunster as second of the second division
- R.A.E.C. Mons as third of the second division
- Cercle Brugge K.S.V. as sixth of the second division

Periods 1 and 3 were won by champion K.V. Mechelen and Heusden-Zolder finished 4th of the second division.

=== Results and table ===
Team	Pts	Pld	W	D	L	GF	GA
R.A.E.C. Mons	11	6	3	2	1	6	4
Heusden-Zolder	10	6	3	1	2	9	6
K.S.V. Ingelmunster	9	6	3	0	3	9	9
Cercle Brugge K.S.V.	4	6	1	1	4	4	9

Heusden-Zolder	2 - 0	Mons
Cercle	3 - 1	Ingelmunster
Mons	0 - 0	Heusden-Zolder
Ingelmunster	1 - 0	Cercle
Heusden-Zolder	1 - 3	Ingelmunster
Mons	0 - 0	Cercle

Ingelmunster	1 - 2	Mons
Cercle	0 - 2	Heusden-Zolder
Cercle	0 - 2	Mons
Ingelmunster	2 - 1	Heusden-Zolder
Heusden-Zolder	3 - 1	Cercle
Mons	2 - 1	Ingelmunster

== 2003 ==
=== Qualifiers ===
The following teams qualified for the 2003 play-offs:

- K. Heusden-Zolder as winner of the first and second periods
- K.A.S. Eupen as second of the second division
- S.V. Zulte-Waregem as fourth of the second division
- F.C. Denderleeuw as fifth of the second division

Period 3 was won by champion Cercle Brugge K.S.V. and Heusden-Zolder finished 3rd of the second division.

=== Results and table ===
Team	Pts	Pld	W	D	L	GF	GA
Heusden-Zolder	13	6	4	1	1	11	4
K.A.S. Eupen	7	6	2	1	3	3	7
S.V. Zulte-Waregem	7	6	2	1	3	9	10
F.C. Denderleeuw	7	6	2	1	3	7	9

Zulte-Waregem	0 - 1	Eupen
Denderleeuw	1 - 0	Heusden-Zolder
Heusden-Zolder	4 - 2	Zulte-Waregem
Eupen	1 - 0	Denderleeuw
Eupen	1 - 1	Heusden-Zolder
Zulte-Waregem	3 - 2	Denderleeuw

Heusden-Zolder	2 - 0	Eupen
Denderleeuw	2 - 2	Zulte-Waregem
Heusden-Zolder	3 - 0	Denderleeuw
Eupen	0 - 2	Zulte-Waregem
Denderleeuw	2 - 0	Eupen
Zulte-Waregem	0 - 1	Heusden-Zolder

== 2004 ==
=== Qualifiers ===
The following teams qualified for the 2004 play-offs:

- K.F.C. Verbroedering Geel as winner of the first period
- A.F.C. Tubize as winner of the second period
- K.V. Oostende as second of the second division
- K.S.V. Roeselare as third of the second division

Period 3 was won by champion F.C. Molenbeek Brussels Strombeek.

=== Results and table ===
Team	Pts	Pld	W	D	L	GF	GA
K.V. Oostende*	9	6	3	0	3	8	8
K.F.C. Verbroedering Geel	9	6	3	0	3	13	12
K.S.V. Roeselare	8	6	2	2	2	7	8
A.F.C. Tubize	8	6	2	2	2	9	9

Oostende	1 - 0	Geel
Roeselare	0 - 0	Tubize
Tubize	2 - 1	Oostende
Geel	0 - 1	Roeselare
Geel	3 - 2	Tubize
Oostende	1 - 0	Roeselare

Tubize	3 - 2	Geel
Roeselare	2 - 1	Oostende
Tubize	2 - 2	Roeselare
Geel	4 - 3	Oostende
Roeselare	2 - 4	Geel
Oostende	1 - 0	Tubize

* Oostende finished 2nd in second division while Geel finished 10th.

== 2005 ==
=== Qualifiers ===
The following teams qualified for the 2005 play-offs:

- K.S.V. Roeselare as winner of the 2nd period
- K.F.C. Verbroedering Geel as 3rd of the second division
- R. Antwerp F.C. as 4th of the second division
- K.V. Red Star Waasland as 5th of the second division

Periods 1 and 3 were won by champion S.V. Zulte-Waregem.

=== Results and table ===
Team	Pts	Pld	W	D	L	GF	GA
K.S.V. Roeselare	16	6	5	1	0	10	1
K.F.C. Verbroedering Geel	11	6	3	2	1	12	5
R. Antwerp F.C.	4	6	1	1	4	6	14
K.V. Red Star Waasland	2	6	0	2	4	4	12

Roeselare	1 - 0	Antwerp
Waasland	0 - 2	Geel
Antwerp	0 - 2	Roeselare
Geel	1 - 1	Waasland
Roeselare	1 - 0	Geel
Antwerp	2 - 1	Waasland

Geel	3 - 1	Antwerp
Waasland	0 - 2	Roeselare
Waasland	2 - 2	Antwerp
Geel	1 - 1	Roeselare
Roeselare	3 - 0	Waasland
Antwerp	1 - 5	Geel

== 2006 ==
=== Qualifiers ===
The following teams qualified for the 2006 play-offs:

- Lierse S.K. as 17th of the Jupiler League
- K.V.S.K. United Overpelt-Lommel as 2nd of the second division
- K.F.C. Verbroedering Geel as 3rd of the second division
- K.F.C. V.W. Hamme as 4th of the second division

The period winners were not qualified as it was not decided before the beginning of the play-offs whether the points raised by clubs against Beringen-Heusden-Zolder were to be retired or not.

=== Results and table ===
Team	Pts	Pld	W	D	L	GF	GA
Lierse S.K.	12	6	4	0	2	13	7
K.V.S.K. United Overpelt-Lommel	10	6	3	1	2	11	9
K.F.C. V.W. Hamme	9	6	3	0	3	8	9
K.F.C. Verbroedering Geel	4	6	1	1	4	8	15

United	2 - 2	Geel
Lierse	2 - 0	Hamme
Geel	2 - 3	Lierse
Hamme	2 - 1	United
United	2 - 1	Lierse
Geel	2 - 1	Hamme

Lierse	2 - 1	United
Hamme	2 - 1	Geel
Hamme	2 - 0	Lierse
Geel	1 - 2	United
United	3 - 1	Hamme
Lierse	5 - 0	Geel

== 2007 ==
=== Qualifiers ===
The following teams qualified for the 2007 play-offs:

- Lierse S.K. as number 17 of the Belgian League
- Royal Antwerp FC as winner of the second period
- Y.R. K.V. Mechelen as 2nd of the second division
- K.V. Kortrijk as winner of the third period

Period 1 was won by champion F. C. Verbroedering Dender E.H.

=== Results and table ===
Team	Pts	Pld	W	D	L	GF	GA
Y.R. K.V. Mechelen	16	6	5	1	0	11	3
Royal Antwerp FC	10	6	3	1	2	7	4
Lierse S.K.	9	6	3	0	3	10	8
K.V. Kortrijk	0	6	0	0	6	4	17

Antwerp	0 - 0	Mechelen
Kortrijk	0 - 1	Lierse
Mechelen	1 - 0	Antwerp
Lierse	5 - 2	Kortrijk
Antwerp	2 - 1	Lierse
Mechelen	3 - 0	Kortrijk

Lierse	1 - 2	Mechelen
Kortrijk	0 - 2	Antwerp
Kortrijk	2 - 3	Mechelen
Lierse	2 - 0	Antwerp
Antwerp	3 - 0	Kortrijk
Mechelen	2 - 0	Lierse

== 2008 ==
=== Qualifiers ===
The following teams qualified for the 2008 play-offs:

- A.F.C. Tubize for finishing second
- Oud-Heverlee Leuven for finishing third
- K.V.S.K. United Overpelt-Lommel for finishing fourth
- Royal Antwerp FC for finishing fifth

=== Results and table ===
Team	Pts	Pld	W	D	L	GF	GA
A.F.C. Tubize	18	6	6	0	0	9	1
Royal Antwerp FC	12	6	4	0	2	10	5
K.V.S.K. United Overpelt-Lommel	6	6	2	0	4	6	12
Oud-Heverlee Leuven	0	6	0	0	6	2	9

KVSK United	2 - 1	OH Leuven
Tubize	1 - 0	Antwerp
Antwerp	3 - 1	KVSK United
OH Leuven	0 - 1	Tubize
OH Leuven	1 - 2	Antwerp
KVSK United	0 - 1	Tubize

Antwerp	1 - 0	OH Leuven
Tubize	3 - 1	KVSK United
Antwerp	0 - 1	Tubize
OH Leuven	0 - 1	KVSK United
Tubize	2 - 0	OH Leuven
KVSK United	1 - 4	Antwerp

== 2009 ==
As a result of the Belgian First Division reducing in size to 16 teams for 2009-10, there will be two playoffs in 2009. Firstly, the teams ranked between two and five in the second division will meet (best ranked team will play away first) with two teams progressing. These two teams progress into a second playoff (double round-robin), together with the teams placed 15 and 16 in the Belgian First Division 2008–09. The winner of this second playoff will play in the Belgian First Division 2009–10.

=== First playoff ===
The following teams qualified for the 2009 first playoff round:

- Lierse for finishing second.
- Antwerp for finishing third.
- Waasland for finishing fourth.
- Tournai for finishing fifth.

The draw was made on May 4, 2009 and resulted in the following games:

Team 1	Agg.	Team 2	1st leg	2nd leg
Tournai (Belgium)	0-2	(Belgium) Antwerp	0-0	0-2
Waasland (Belgium)	3-4	(Belgium) Lierse	1-1	2-3

=== Second playoff ===
The following teams qualified for the 2009 second playoff round:

- Dender, for finishing in 15th place in the Belgian First Division.
- Roeselare, for finishing in 16th place in the Belgian First Division.
- Antwerp, winners of the first playoff round.
- Lierse, winners of the first playoff round.

Team	Pts	Pld	W	D	L	GF	GA
Roeselare	13	6	4	1	1	13	7
Dender	8	6	2	2	2	8	7
Lierse	6	6	1	3	2	5	7
Antwerp	5	6	1	2	3	6	11

Antwerp	1 - 3	Roeselare
Dender	1 - 1	Lierse
Roeselare	0 - 0	Dender
Lierse	0 - 0	Antwerp
Roeselare	1 - 0	Lierse
Antwerp	0 - 2	Dender

Lierse	1 - 3	Roeselare
Dender	1 - 2	Antwerp
Roeselare	4 - 2	Antwerp
Lierse	2 - 1	Dender
Dender	3 - 2	Roeselare
Antwerp	1 - 1	Lierse

== 2010 ==
=== Qualifiers ===
The following teams qualified for the 2010 play-offs:

- K.S.V. Roeselare for finishing fifteenth in the first division
- K.V.S.K. United Overpelt-Lommel for finishing second
- R.A.E.C. Mons for finishing third
- K.A.S. Eupen for finishing fourth

=== Results and table ===
Team	Pts	Pld	W	D	L	GF	GA
Eupen (P)	13	6	4	1	1	9	4
Mons	8	6	2	2	2	8	8
KVSK United	6	6	2	0	4	7	7
Roeselare	6	6	1	3	2	5	10

Mons	3-2	Eupen
Roeselare	2-1	KVSK United
KVSK United	1-0	Mons
Eupen	3-0	Roeselare
Eupen	1-0	KVSK United
Mons	2-2	Roeselare

KVSK United	0-1	Eupen
Roeselare	0-0	Mons
KVSK United	4-1	Roeselare
Eupen	2-1	Mons
Roeselare	0-0	Eupen
Mons	2-1	KVSK United
