= 1973–74 in Belgian football =

Football in Belgium
- Season: 1973–74

The 1973–74 season was the 71st season of competitive football in Belgium. RSC Anderlechtois won their 16th Division I title. KSV Waregem won the Belgian Cup against second division club KSK Tongeren (4-1). The Belgium national football team finished their 1974 FIFA World Cup qualification campaign at the second place of their group behind the Netherlands, with the same number of points but a smaller goal difference. They thus did not qualify for the 1974 FIFA World Cup finals in West Germany. The Belgian Women's First Division was won by R Saint-Nicolas FC Liège.

== Overview ==
Belgium continued their qualifying campaign for the 1974 FIFA World Cup with a win over Norway and a draw against the Netherlands. They thus finished the qualifications with 10 points, level with the Netherlands. However, since the Netherlands had scored 24 goals for only 2 goals conceded, and Belgium had scored 12 goals (for 0 goals conceded), the Netherlands qualified for the World Cup finals instead of Belgium.

At the end of the season, the number of teams in Division I was increased from 16 to 20, and the Royal Belgian Football Association introduced the Belgian Second Division final round, a double round-robin tournament contested by 4 teams, the top 2 of which would qualify for the next season Division I. The bottom 2 teams of Division I (K Lierse SK and K Sint-Truidense VV) as well as the 4th and 5th-placed teams in Division II (KAS Eupen and KFC Winterslag) were invited to play this final round. K Lierse SK and KFC Winterslag finished respectively 1st and 2nd and qualified for the Division I, together with the top 3 teams in Division II (ROC de Montignies-sur-Sambre, ASV Oostende KM and KSC Lokeren) as well as R Charleroi SC (13th-placed team). The bottom 2 teams of the final round were relegated to Division II (K Sint-Truidense VV and KAS Eupen).

The last club in Division II (KAA Gent) was relegated to Division III, to be replaced by both Division III winners and runners-up as well as one of the two 3rd-placed teams (K Waterschei SV Thor Genk, VG Oostende, R Tilleur FC, R Albert Elisabeth Club Mons and RAA Louviéroise).
The bottom club of each Division III league (AS Herstalienne, RCS Verviétois, R Dinant FC and RCS La Forestoise) were relegated to the Promotion, to be replaced by the winner and runner-up of each Promotion league (K Stade Leuven, VC Rotselaar, CS Andennais, RJS Bas-Oha, KAV Dendermonde, K Willebroekse SV, K Zonhoven VV and KFC Verbroedering Geel).

== National team ==
Date	Venue	Opponents	Score	Comp	Belgium scorers
October 31, 1973	Stade Emile Versé, Brussels (H)	Norway	2-0	WCQ	Léon Dolmans, Raoul Lambert
November 18, 1973	Olympic Stadium, Amsterdam (A)	Netherlands	0-0	WCQ	
March 13, 1974	Friedrich-Ludwig-Jahn-Sportpark, Berlin (A)	East Germany	0-1	F	
April 17, 1974	Stade de Sclessin, Liège (H)	Poland	1-1	F	Wilfried Van Moer
May 1, 1974	Charmilles Stadium, Genève (A)	Switzerland	1-0	F	
June 1, 1974	Klokke Stadion, Bruges (H)	Scotland	2-1	F	Roger Henrotay, Raoul Lambert

Key

- H = Home match
- A = Away match
- N = On neutral ground
- F = Friendly
- WCQ = World Cup qualification
- o.g. = own goal

== European competitions ==
Club Brugge KV beat Floriana FC of Malta in the first round of the 1973–74 European Champion Clubs' Cup (won 8-0 at home, 2-0 away) but lost in the second round to FC Basel of Switzerland (won 2-1 at home, lost 4-6 away).

RSC Anderlechtois lost in the first round of the 1973–74 European Cup Winners' Cup to FC Zürich of Switzerland on away goals (won 3-2 at home, lost 0-1 away).

The following clubs qualified to play the 1973–74 UEFA Cup: Standard Club Liégeois (2nd-placed in the championship), R White Daring Molenbeek (3rd) and K Beerschot VAV (4th).
In the first round, Standard beat Ards FC of Northern Ireland (lost 2-3 away, won 6-1 at home) and RWDM beat RCD Espanyol of Spain (won 3-0 away, lost 1-2 at home), but K Beerschot VAV lost to Vitoria FC of Portugal (lost both legs 0-2).
In the second round, Standard beat Universitatea Craiova of Romania (won 2-0 at home, drew 1-1 away) but RWDM lost to Vitoria FC on away goals (lost 0-1 away, won 2-1 at home).
Standard were finally eliminated by Feyenoord Rotterdam of the Netherlands in the third round on away goals (won 3-1 at home, lost 0-2 away).

== Honours ==
Competition	Winner
Division I	RSC Anderlechtois
Cup	KSV Waregem
Women Division I	R Saint-Nicolas FC Liège
Division II	ROC de Montignies-sur-Sambre
Division III	K Waterschei SV Thor Genk and VG Oostende
Promotion	K Stade Leuven, CS Andennais, KAV Dendermonde and K Zonhoven VV

== Final league tables ==
=== Division I ===
- 1973-74 Top scorer: Hungarian Attila Ladinszky (RSC Anderlechtois) with 22 goals
- 1973 Golden Shoe: Maurice Martens (RR White - R White Daring Molenbeek)
