= Timothy Durwael =

Belgian footballer (born 1991)

Personal information
- Full name: Timothy Julien Durwael
- Date of birth: 24 February 1991 (age 35)
- Place of birth: Hasselt, Belgium
- Height: 1.73 m (5 ft 8 in)
- Position: Right-back

Team information
- Current team: Houtvenne
- Number: 6

Youth career
- Sporting Hasselt
- Genk

Senior career*
| Years | Team | Apps | (Gls) |
| 2009–2012 | Genk | 9 | (0) |
| 2012–2017 | Eindhoven | 69 | (1) |
| 2017–2018 | Sporting Hasselt | | |
| 2018–2019 | Turnhout | | |
| 2019–2020 | Roda JC | 13 | (0) |
| 2021– | Houtvenne | 8 | (0) |

International career
| 2006 | Belgium U15 | 6 | (0) |
| 2006–2007 | Belgium U16 | 12 | (0) |
| 2007–2008 | Belgium U17 | 8 | (1) |
| 2008–2009 | Belgium U18 | 10 | (1) |
| 2009–2010 | Belgium U19 | 17 | (1) |
| 2010–2011 | Belgium U21 | 2 | (0) |
- * Club domestic league appearances and goals as of 23 January 2022

Timothy Julien Durwael (born 24 February 1991) is a Belgian footballer who plays as a right-back for Belgian Division 2 club Houtvenne.

== Club career ==
Born in Hasselt, Durwael began his career with Sporting Hasselt. After this spell, he joined Genk. He made his first team debut for Genk on 30 August 2009, in a 1–1 draw against Germinal Beerschot.

Durwael decided to retire at the end of 2020. In 2021, he came out of retirement to join Belgian Division 2 club Houtvenne.
