= 1971–72 in Belgian football =

Football in Belgium
- Season: 1971–72

The 1971–72 season was the 69th season of competitive football in Belgium. RSC Anderlechtois won their 15th Division I title and made the double by beating Standard Club Liégeois in the Belgian Cup final (1-0). Standard Club Liégeois reached the quarter-finals of the 1971–72 European Champion Clubs' Cup and K Lierse SK the quarter-finals of the first ever UEFA Cup. The Belgium national football team qualified for the first time for the European Championship finals, by finishing first of their group and by beating Italy in the second qualifying round. Belgium was subsequently chosen to host the finals, of which they finished 3rd. For the first time, a Belgian Women's First Division championship was played (with three leagues at the top level), won by Astrio Begijnendijk.

== Overview ==
Belgium finished the first UEFA Euro 1972 qualifying round by losing to Scotland and drawing against Portugal, though their good start (4 wins) was enough to secure the first place in Group 5 with 9 points (2 points ahead of Portugal). Belgium thus qualified for the second qualifying round, to be played against Group 6 winners, Italy, on a home and away basis. The first game ended in a goalless draw, and Belgium qualified for the finals by beating Italy in the second game (2-1). For the first time in their history, Belgium would take part in the European Championship finals. Belgium was even chosen to host the finals (two semi-finals, a game for third-place and the final). They lost however in the semifinals to West Germany (1-2) at the Bosuilstadion in Antwerp, but won the game for the third-place against Hungary (2-1). The final was won by West Germany against Soviet Union (3-0). Belgium also started their qualifying campaign for the 1974 FIFA World Cup with two wins over Iceland.

At the end of the season, KSV Waregem and KSK Beveren were relegated to Division II, to be replaced by K Berchem Sport and K Beringen FC from Division II.
The bottom 2 clubs in Division II (K Waterschei SV Thor Genk and R.C.S. Verviétois) were relegated to Division III, to be replaced by KSC Lokeren and KFC Winterslag (after winning a play-off game 2–1 against VV Patro Eisden) from Division III.
The bottom club of each Division III league (K Willebroekse SV, RE Mouscron, KSC Maccabi Voetbal Antwerp and Wavre Sports) were relegated to Promotion, to be replaced by R Jet de Bruxelles, R Stade Waremmien FC, KVV Looi Sport Tessenderlo and Kortrijk Sport from Promotion..

== National team ==
Date	Venue	Opponents	Score	Comp	Belgium scorers
November 7, 1971	Stade de Bureaufosse, Saint-Nicolas (H)	Luxembourg	1-0	F	Erwin Vandendaele
November 10, 1971	Pittodrie Stadium, Aberdeen (A)	Scotland	0-1	ECQ	
November 21, 1971	Estádio da Luz, Lisbon (A)	Portugal	1-1	ECQ	Raoul Lambert
April 29, 1972	San Siro, Milan (A)	Italy	0-0	ECP	
May 13, 1972	Stade Emile Versé, Brussels (H)	Italy	2-1	ECP	Wilfried Van Moer, Paul Van Himst
May 18, 1972	Stade de Sclessin, Liège (H)	Iceland	4-0	WCQ	Paul Van Himst, Odilon Polleunis (3)
May 22, 1972	Klokke Stadion, Bruges (A)	Iceland	4-0	WCQ	Frans Janssens, Raoul Lambert (2), Jean Dockx
June 14, 1972	Bosuilstadion, Antwerp (N)	West Germany	1-2	ECSF	Odilon Polleunis
June 17, 1972	Stade de Sclessin, Liège (N)	Hungary	2-1	ECTG	Raoul Lambert, Paul Van Himst

Key

- H = Home match
- A = Away match
- N = On neutral ground
- F = Friendly
- ECQ = European Championship qualification
- ECP = European Championship play-off
- ECSF = European Championship semifinals
- ECTG = European Championship third-place game
- WCQ = World Cup qualification
- o.g. = own goal

== European competitions ==
Standard Club Liégeois beat Linfield FC of Northern Ireland in the first round of the 1971–72 European Champion Clubs' Cup (won 2–0 at home, 3–2 away), and CSKA Moscow in the second round (lost 0–1 away, won 2–0 at home). In the quarter-finals, Standard lost to FC Internazionale on away goals (lost 0–1 away, won 2–1 at home).

K Beerschot VAV beat Anorthosis Famagusta FC of Cyprus in the first round of the 1971–72 European Cup Winners' Cup (won 7–0 at home, 1–0 away) but they lost in the second round to Dynamo Berlin of East Germany (lost both legs 1–3).

The Inter-Cities Fairs Cup was taken over by UEFA at the start of the season, and was renamed UEFA Cup. The 3 Belgian clubs who qualified for the 1971–72 UEFA Cup were RFC Brugeois, RSC Anderlechtois and K Lierse SK.
In the first round, K Lierse SK surprisingly beat the last Inter-Cities Fairs Cup winner Leeds United AFC (lost 0–2 at home, won 4–0 away), but RFC Brugeois lost to FK Željezničar Sarajevo (lost 0–3 away, won 3–1 at home) and RSC Anderlechtois lost to Bologna FC 1909 (drew 1–1 away, lost 0–2 at home).
In the second round, K Lierse SK confirmed their good form by eliminating Rosenborg BK of Norway on away goals (lost 1–4 away, won 3–0 at home), then PSV Eindhoven of the Netherlands in the third round (lost 0–1 away, won 4–0 at home).
They were only stopped in the quarter-finals by AC Milan (lost 0–2 away, drew 1–1 at home).

== Honours ==
Competition	Winner
Division I	RSC Anderlechtois
Cup	RSC Anderlechtois
Women Division I	Astrio Begijnendijk
Division II	K Berchem Sport
Division III	KSC Lokeren and KFC Winterslag
Promotion	R Jet de Bruxelles, R Stade Waremmien FC, KVV Looi Sport Tessenderlo and Kortrijk Sport

== Final league tables ==
=== Premier Division ===
- 1971-72 Top scorer: Raoul Lambert (RFC Brugeois) with 17 goals
- 1970 Golden Shoe: Erwin Vandendaele (RFC Brugeois)
