= Joseph Nelis =

Belgian footballer (1917–1994)

Personal information
- Date of birth: 1 April 1917
- Place of birth: Tutbury, England
- Date of death: 12 April 1994 (aged 77)
- Position: Forward

Senior career*
Years	Team	Apps	(Gls)
1934–1939	Royal Berchem Sport		
1939–1943	R. Union Saint-Gilloise		

International career
1940	Belgium	2	(2)
- * Club domestic league appearances and goals

Joseph "Jef" Nelis (1 April 1917 – 12 April 1994) was a Belgian footballer who played as a forward for Royal Berchem Sport. Born in England, he represented the Belgium national team at international level, scoring two goals in two appearances. He was picked for the World Cup in 1938 in France, but did not play.
