= 1939–40 in Belgian football =

Football in Belgium
- Season: 1939–40

The national football competitions in Belgium were cancelled during 1939–40 season because of the upcoming World War II. However, the Belgium national football team played two official games during the season, both against the Netherlands.

== Overview ==
A Premier Division was started in the 1939-40 season but was stopped on May 10, 1940, when the Battle of Belgium started. Liersche SK was then leader after 9 games on 26 were played.

== National team ==
Date	Venue	Opponents	Score*	Comp	Belgium scorers
March 17, 1940	Olympisch Stadion, Antwerp (H)	Netherlands	7-1	F	Joseph Nelis, Bernard Voorhoof, Jules Van Craen (4), Charles Vanden Wouwer
April 21, 1940	Olympic Stadium, Amsterdam (A)	Netherlands	2-4	F	Jules Van Craen, Joseph Nelis

* Belgium score given first

Key

- H = Home match
- A = Away match
- N = On neutral ground
- F = Friendly
- o.g. = own goal
