= 1941–42 in Belgian football =

Football in Belgium
- Season: 1941–42

The 1941–42 season was the 40th season of competitive football in Belgium. Official national competitions resumed in that season and teams played in the same league as they did during the interrupted 1939–40 season. Lierse SK won their 2nd official Premier Division title. The Belgium national football team did not play any official match during the season.

== Overview ==
At the end of the season, no team were relegated to Division I in order to increase the number of teams from 14 to 16 in the Premier Division. RCS La Forestoise (Division I A winner) and RRC de Bruxelles (Division I B winner) were promoted to the Premier Division.
Meanwhile, Division I was also increased in size, from 14 clubs to 16 (Division I A) and 15 (Division I B), and Promotion was also extended: from 11 to 16 in Promotion A, from 11 to 13 in Promotion B and from 14 to 15 in Promotion C and D. Promotion was won by FC Vigor Hamme, KFC Verbroedering Geel, CS Andennais and K Tongersche SV Cercle, who were promoted to Division I while no clubs were relegated to Promotion. Union Hutoise FC, as the best runners-up were also promoted to Division I.

== Honours ==
Competition	Winner
Premier Division	Lierse SK
Division I	RCS La Forestoise and RRC de Bruxelles
Promotion	FC Vigor Hamme, KFC Verbroedering Geel, CS Andennais and K Tongersche SV Cercle
