= Hans Posthumus =

Dutch footballer

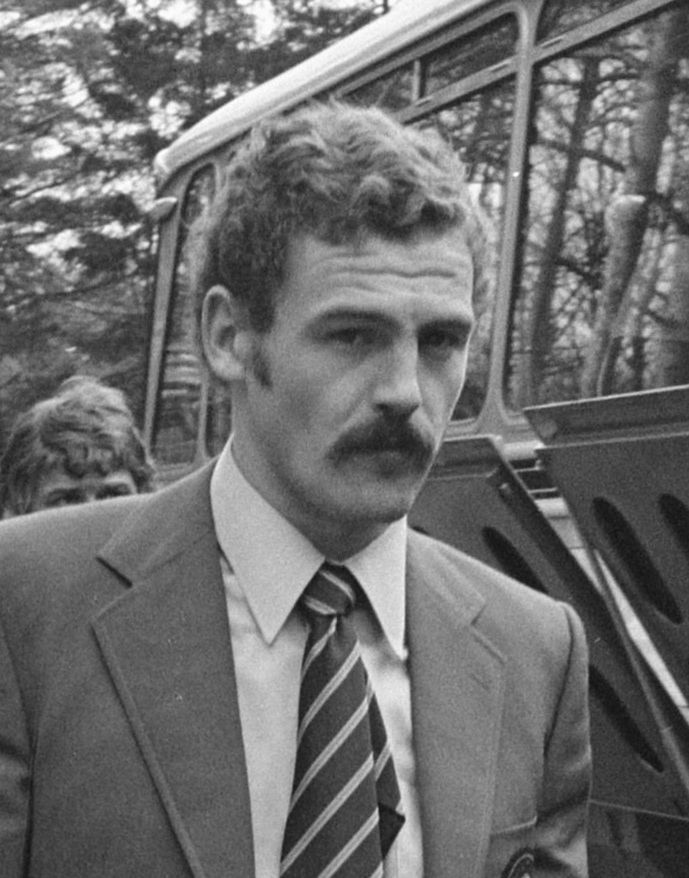
- Posthumus in 1972

Personal information
- Full name: Johannes Posthumus
- Date of birth: 10 March 1947
- Place of birth: Harderwijk, Netherlands
- Date of death: 15 February 2016 (aged 68)
- Height: 1.91 m (6 ft 3 in)
- Position: Forward

Youth career
- VVOG

Senior career*
Years	Team	Apps	(Gls)
1965–1969	VVOG		
1969–1970	Wageningen		
1970–1972	Feyenoord		
1972–1974	Mechelen		
1974–1976	Lierse		
1976–1978	NEC		
- * Club domestic league appearances and goals

Hans Posthumus (10 March 1947 – 15 February 2016) was a Dutch professional footballer who played as a forward.

== Career ==
Born in Harderwijk, he played for VVOG, Wageningen, Feyenoord, Mechelen, Lierse and NEC. While with Lierse, he was the top-scorer in the Belgian Pro League during the 1975–76 season. He retired from professional football in October 1978, at the age of 31, due to back pain.

== Honours ==
Feyenoord

- Eredivisie: 1970–71

Individual

- Belgian First Division top scorer: 1975–76 (26 goals)
