= Belgian Second Division play-offs =

Belgian football league play-offs

The Belgian Second Division play-offs were a series of playoff matches to decide promotion to the Belgian Pro League, organised between 1974 and 2015. Following a large reform of the Belgian football league system at the end of the 2015–16 season, the play-offs were no longer held. In the earlier years these play-offs were contested by teams of the Belgian Second Division but since 2009 also a team from the Belgian Pro League took part. Four teams normally played these play-offs, with the winner being promoted to (or avoiding relegation from) the Belgian Pro League.

== Eligibility ==
The 34 regular-season games in the Belgian Second Division were grouped into 3 periods: the first period contained the first 10 rounds of matches, the next period matches 11 to 22, and the remaining 12 matches were part of the third and last period. The overall leader after 34 games was automatically promoted as second division champion. The four qualifiers for the play-offs were the winners of the three periods, and the second-last team in the first division.

Exceptions to these rules were numerous, as no team is allowed to play in the first division without a professional license. Also it was frequently the case that the overall champion won one or several periods. Theoretically, a period winner might be near the bottom of the overall rankings, either relegated to the third division or in the third division playoff: such a team would also be ineligible for the second division playoff. In all these circumstances, any space in the playoffs is filled by the next-highest team in the overall regular-season.

== The competition ==
The play-offs were a double round robin tournament with 6 matchdays, spaced over 19 days. Standings were determined by the following criteria, in order:

1. number of points, with three points for a win and one for a draw;
2. number of wins;

If teams were still equal, a test match needed to be organised between those teams, which last occurred in 2011.

== Last winners ==
Below is a list of the winners of the play-offs, who thereby qualified for next season's Pro League. The first year, the two top clubs were qualified, K Lierse SK finishing first and KFC Winterslag qualifying as second-placed team. In 1996, three clubs had to qualify for Belgian First Division and the second-placed team of the second division (KRC Genk) skipped the play-offs.

- 1974: K. Lierse S.K.
- 1975: R.A.A. Louviéroise
- 1976: K.V. Kortrijk
- 1977: R.A.A. Louviéroise
- 1978: K. Berchem Sport
- 1979: K.S.C. Hasselt
- 1980: K.V. Kortrijk
- 1981: K.V. Mechelen
- 1982: K. Beerschot V.A.V.
- 1983: K. Beringen F.C.
- 1984: Racing Jet de Bruxelles
- 1985: R. Charleroi S.C.
- 1986: Racing Jet de Bruxelles
- 1987: K.F.C. Winterslag
- 1988: K. Lierse S.K.
- 1989: K.A.A. Gent
- 1990: K.R.C. Genk
- 1991: K.S.C. Eendracht Aalst
- 1992: K. Boom F.C.
- 1993: K.V. Oostende
- 1994: K.S.C. Eendracht Aalst
- 1995: K.R.C. Harelbeke
- 1996: R.E. Mouscron
- 1997: K.V.C. Westerlo
- 1998: K.V. Kortrijk
- 1999: K.F.C. Verbroedering Geel
- 2000: R.A.A. Louviéroise
- 2001: RWD Molenbeek
- 2002: Mons
- 2003: Beringen-Heusden-Zolder
- 2004: K.V. Oostende
- 2005: Roeselare
- 2006: K. Lierse S.K.
- 2007: KV Mechelen
- 2008: Tubize
- 2009: K.S.V. Roeselare
- 2010: Eupen
- 2011: Mons
- 2012: Waasland-Beveren
- 2013: Cercle Brugge
- 2014: Mouscron-Péruwelz
- 2015: Oud-Heverlee Leuven

== See also ==
- Belgian Second Division play-offs 2001–10
- Belgian Second Division play-offs 2011–20
