= K. Beringen-Heusden-Zolder =

Beringen-Heusden-Zolder
- Full name: Koninklijke; Beringen-Heusden-Zolder
- Founded: 1936
- Dissolved: 2006
- 2005–06: Second division, downgraded
Home colours	Away colours

K. Beringen-Heusden-Zolder was a Belgian football club, from the municipalities of Heusden-Zolder and Beringen in Limburg. Its stadium has been located in the municipality of Beringen-Mijn from 2004 to 2006 (after its relegation from the Belgian First Division).

== History ==
It was founded in 1936 as S.K. Heusden and it eventually changed its name to K.S.K. Heusden. The team qualified for the third division in 1997. In 1999 the club merged with K.F.C. Helzold to become K. Heusden-Zolder S.K.. In 2000–01 it played in the second division for the first time and ended at 12th place, as it had won the third division playoff to Kortrijk after having lost the title to Mons in a test-match for the first place. The next season it finished 4th and it moved to the stadium of Genk.

In 2002–03 it qualified for the next Belgian First Division as it finished 3rd and won the final round. Doing this, the club became the fastest rising team ever in Belgian football history, being promoted five times in only 10 years without being relegated. At the end of the 2003–04 season however, the club was relegated and it changed its name at the same time. In 2005–06, K. Beringen-Heusden-Zolder did not ask for a 2nd division license because of financial problems and it was subsequently relegated to the third division on 2 March 2006 for the 2006–07 season. Some time later the club went into liquidation. On 25 April 2006, the club of Berkenbos V.V. playing in the Promotion C changed its name to KVV Heusden-Zolder.

== Honours ==
- Belgian Second Division final round:
  - Winners (1): 2003
- Belgian Third Division Playoff:
  - Winners (1): 1999–2000
