= UEFA Euro 1972 squads =

1972 UEFA championship squads

These are the rosters to the 1972 UEFA European Football Championship, which was in Belgium, from 14 June to 18 June 1972. The players' listed ages is their age on the tournament's opening day (14 June 1972).

The tournament squads were remarkable in that every player in the tournament played for a club in his native country.

== Belgium ==
Manager: Raymond Goethals

No.	Pos.	Player	Date of birth (age)	Caps	Club
1	GK	Christian Piot	6 October 1947 (aged 24)	23	(Belgium) Standard Liège
2	DF	Georges Heylens	8 August 1941 (aged 30)	60	(Belgium) Anderlecht
3	DF	Léon Dolmans	6 April 1945 (aged 27)	5	(Belgium) Standard Liège
4	DF	Jean Thissen	21 April 1946 (aged 26)	23	(Belgium) Standard Liège
5	MF	Erwin Vandendaele	5 March 1945 (aged 27)	11	(Belgium) Club Brugge
6	FW	Jean Dockx	24 May 1941 (aged 31)	20	(Belgium) Anderlecht
7	MF	Léon Semmeling	4 January 1940 (aged 32)	28	(Belgium) Standard Liège
8	DF	Maurice Martens	5 June 1947 (aged 25)	4	(Belgium) Molenbeek
9	FW	Raoul Lambert	20 October 1944 (aged 27)	13	(Belgium) Club Brugge
10	FW	Paul Van Himst (captain)	2 October 1943 (aged 28)	65	(Belgium) Anderlecht
11	MF	Jan Verheyen	9 July 1944 (aged 27)	15	(Belgium) Anderlecht
12	GK	Luc Sanders	6 October 1945 (aged 26)	0	(Belgium) Club Brugge
13	DF	Gilbert Van Binst	5 July 1951 (aged 20)	0	(Belgium) Anderlecht
14	FW	Odilon Polleunis	1 May 1943 (aged 29)	15	(Belgium) Sint-Truidense
15	FW	Jacques Teugels	3 August 1946 (aged 25)	7	(Belgium) Molenbeek
16	MF	John Thio	2 September 1944 (aged 27)	17	(Belgium) Club Brugge
21	FW	Frans Janssens	25 September 1945 (aged 26)	6	(Belgium) Lierse

== Hungary ==
Manager: Rudolf Illovszky

No.	Pos.	Player	Date of birth (age)	Caps	Club
1	GK	István Géczi	13 June 1944 (aged 28)	13	(Hungary) Ferencváros
2	DF	Tibor Fábián	26 July 1946 (aged 25)	9	(Hungary) Vasas
3	DF	Miklós Páncsics	4 February 1944 (aged 28)	28	(Hungary) Ferencváros
4	DF	Péter Juhász	3 August 1948 (aged 23)	15	(Hungary) Újpesti Dózsa
5	FW	Lajos Szűcs	10 December 1943 (aged 28)	28	(Hungary) Budapesti Honvéd
6	DF	László Bálint	1 February 1948 (aged 24)	6	(Hungary) Ferencváros
7	MF	István Szőke	13 February 1947 (aged 25)	8	(Hungary) Ferencváros
8	MF	Lajos Kocsis	17 June 1947 (aged 24)	17	(Hungary) Budapesti Honvéd
9	FW	Ferenc Bene (captain)	17 December 1944 (aged 27)	60	(Hungary) Újpesti Dózsa
10	MF	Lajos Kű	5 July 1948 (aged 23)	3	(Hungary) Ferencváros
11	FW	Sándor Zámbó	10 October 1944 (aged 27)	24	(Hungary) Újpesti Dózsa
12	MF	István Juhász	17 July 1945 (aged 26)	13	(Hungary) Ferencváros
15	FW	Antal Dunai	21 March 1943 (aged 29)	22	(Hungary) Újpesti Dózsa
16	MF	József Kovács	8 April 1949 (aged 23)	3	(Hungary) Videoton
20	MF	Mihály Kozma	1 November 1949 (aged 22)	5	(Hungary) Budapesti Honvéd
22	GK	Imre Rapp	15 September 1937 (aged 34)	0	(Hungary) Pécsi MSC
24	MF	Flórián Albert	15 September 1941 (aged 30)	72	(Hungary) Ferencváros

== Soviet Union ==
Manager: Aleksandr Ponomarev

No.	Pos.	Player	Date of birth (age)	Caps	Club
1	GK	Yevhen Rudakov	2 January 1942 (aged 30)	23	(Soviet Union) Dynamo Kyiv
2	DF	Revaz Dzodzuashvili	10 April 1945 (aged 27)	28	(Soviet Union) Dinamo Tbilisi
3	MF	Murtaz Khurtsilava (captain)	5 January 1943 (aged 29)	52	(Soviet Union) Dinamo Tbilisi
4	DF	Nikolay Abramov	5 January 1950 (aged 22)	2	(Soviet Union) Spartak Moscow
5	DF	Viktor Matviyenko	9 November 1948 (aged 23)	6	(Soviet Union) Dynamo Kyiv
6	MF	Viktor Kolotov	3 July 1949 (aged 22)	14	(Soviet Union) Dynamo Kyiv
7	DF	Vladimir Troshkin	28 September 1947 (aged 24)	5	(Soviet Union) Dynamo Kyiv
8	MF	Anatoly Baidachny	1 October 1952 (aged 19)	3	(Soviet Union) Dynamo Moscow
9	FW	Anatoliy Banishevskiy	23 December 1946 (aged 25)	48	(Soviet Union) Neftchi Baku
10	MF	Vladimir Muntyan	14 September 1946 (aged 25)	29	(Soviet Union) Dynamo Kyiv
11	MF	Oleg Dolmatov	29 November 1948 (aged 23)	6	(Soviet Union) Dynamo Moscow
12	DF	Vladimir Kaplichny	26 May 1944 (aged 28)	38	(Soviet Union) CSKA Moscow
13	DF	Yuriy Istomin	3 July 1944 (aged 27)	26	(Soviet Union) CSKA Moscow
14	MF	Anatoliy Konkov	19 September 1949 (aged 22)	8	(Soviet Union) Shakhtar Donetsk
15	FW	Eduard Kozynkevych	23 May 1949 (aged 23)	5	(Soviet Union) Karpaty Lviv
16	FW	Givi Nodia	2 January 1948 (aged 24)	18	(Soviet Union) Dinamo Tbilisi
18	FW	Volodymyr Onyshchenko	28 October 1949 (aged 22)	1	(Soviet Union) Zorya Voroshylovhrad
19	GK	Vladimir Pilguy	26 January 1948 (aged 24)	1	(Soviet Union) Dynamo Moscow
20	GK	Viktor Bannikov	28 April 1938 (aged 34)	12	(Soviet Union) Torpedo Moscow
21	DF	Mykhailo Fomenko	19 September 1948 (aged 23)	0	(Soviet Union) Dynamo Kyiv
22	FW	Levon Ishtoyan	3 September 1947 (aged 24)	6	(Soviet Union) Ararat Yerevan

== West Germany ==
Manager: Helmut Schön

No.	Pos.	Player	Date of birth (age)	Caps	Club
1	GK	Sepp Maier	28 February 1944 (aged 28)	40	(West Germany) Bayern Munich
2	DF	Horst-Dieter Höttges	10 September 1943 (aged 28)	53	(West Germany) Werder Bremen
3	DF	Paul Breitner	5 September 1951 (aged 20)	7	(West Germany) Bayern Munich
4	DF	Hans-Georg Schwarzenbeck	3 April 1948 (aged 24)	12	(West Germany) Bayern Munich
5	DF	Franz Beckenbauer (captain)	11 September 1945 (aged 26)	61	(West Germany) Bayern Munich
6	MF	Herbert Wimmer	9 November 1944 (aged 27)	16	(West Germany) Borussia Mönchengladbach
7	FW	Jürgen Grabowski	7 July 1944 (aged 27)	26	(West Germany) Eintracht Frankfurt
8	FW	Uli Hoeneß	5 January 1952 (aged 20)	10	(West Germany) Bayern Munich
9	FW	Jupp Heynckes	9 May 1945 (aged 27)	17	(West Germany) Borussia Mönchengladbach
10	MF	Günter Netzer	14 September 1944 (aged 27)	29	(West Germany) Borussia Mönchengladbach
11	FW	Erwin Kremers	23 March 1949 (aged 23)	2	(West Germany) Schalke 04
13	FW	Gerd Müller	3 November 1945 (aged 26)	40	(West Germany) Bayern Munich
14	DF	Berti Vogts	30 December 1946 (aged 25)	42	(West Germany) Borussia Mönchengladbach
15	MF	Rainer Bonhof	29 March 1952 (aged 20)	1	(West Germany) Borussia Mönchengladbach
16	DF	Michael Bella	29 September 1945 (aged 26)	4	(West Germany) MSV Duisburg
17	FW	Hannes Löhr	5 July 1942 (aged 29)	20	(West Germany) 1. FC Köln
18	MF	Horst Köppel	17 May 1948 (aged 24)	9	(West Germany) Borussia Mönchengladbach
22	GK	Wolfgang Kleff	16 November 1946 (aged 25)	2	(West Germany) Borussia Mönchengladbach
