= UEFA Euro 1972 final tournament =

Football tournament

The final tournament of UEFA Euro 1972 was a single-elimination tournament involving the four teams that qualified from the quarter-finals. There were two rounds of matches: a semi-final stage leading to the final to decide the champions. The final tournament began with the semi-finals on 14 June and ended with the final on 18 June at Heysel Stadium in Brussels. West Germany won the tournament with a 3–0 victory over the Soviet Union.

All times Central European Time (UTC+1)

== Format ==
Any game in the final tournament that was undecided by the end of the regular 90 minutes was followed by thirty minutes of extra time (two 15-minute halves). If scores were still level after 30 minutes of extra time, there would be a penalty shootout (at least five penalties each, and more if necessary) to determine who progressed to the next round.

== Teams ==
Team	Method of qualification	Date of qualification	Finals appearance	Last appearance	Previous best performance
Belgium (host)	Quarter-final winner	13 May 1972	1st	—	Debut
Hungary	Quarter-final winner	17 May 1972	2nd	1964	Third place (1964)
Soviet Union	Quarter-final winner	13 May 1972	4th	1968	Winners (1960)
West Germany	Quarter-final winner	13 May 1972	1st	—	Debut

== Bracket ==
Semi-finals
14 June – Antwerp
Belgium	1
West Germany	2
14 June – Brussels (Émile Versé)
Hungary	0
Soviet Union	1

Final
18 June – Brussels (Heysel)
West Germany	3
Soviet Union	0
Third place play-off
17 June – Liège
Hungary	1
Belgium	2

== Semi-finals ==
=== Hungary vs Soviet Union ===
14 June 1972
20:00

Hungary	0–1	Soviet Union
	Report	Konkov 53'

Stade Émile Versé, Brussels
Attendance: 1,659
Referee: Rudi Glöckner (East Germany)

Hungary	Soviet Union

GK	1	István Géczi
SW	3	Miklós Páncsics
CB	2	Tibor Fábián	Yellow card
CB	6	László Bálint	Yellow card
CB	4	Péter Juhász
CM	12	István Juhász
CM	8	Lajos Kocsis		(substituted off) 60'
CM	10	Lajos Kű
RW	7	István Szőke
CF	9	Ferenc Bene (c)		(substituted off) 60'
LW	11	Sándor Zámbó
Substitutions:
FW	15	Antal Dunai		(substituted on) 60'
MF	24	Flórián Albert		(substituted on) 60'
Manager:
Rudolf Illovszky

GK	1	Yevhen Rudakov
SW	3	Murtaz Khurtsilava (c)	Yellow card
CB	2	Revaz Dzodzuashvili
CB	12	Volodymyr Kaplychnyi
CB	13	Yuriy Istomin
CM	14	Anatoliy Konkov
CM	7	Volodymyr Troshkin
CM	6	Viktor Kolotov
RW	8	Anatoly Baidachny
CF	9	Anatoliy Banishevskiy		(substituted off) 70'
LW	18	Volodymyr Onyshchenko
Substitutions:
FW	16	Givi Nodia		(substituted on) 70'
Manager:
Oleksandr Ponomarov

=== Belgium vs West Germany ===
14 June 1972
20:00

Belgium	1–2	West Germany
Polleunis 83'	Report	Müller 24', 71'

Bosuilstadion, Antwerp
Attendance: 55,669
Referee: William Mullan (Scotland)

Belgium	West Germany

GK	1	Christian Piot
SW	5	Erwin Vandendaele	(yellow card) 17'
CB	2	Georges Heylens
CB	4	Jean Thissen
CB	3	Léon Dolmans
RM	7	Léon Semmeling
CM	11	Jan Verheyen
CM	6	Jean Dockx
LM	8	Maurice Martens		(substituted off) 70'
CF	9	Raoul Lambert
CF	10	Paul Van Himst (c)
Substitutions:
FW	14	Odilon Polleunis		(substituted on) 70'
Manager:
Raymond Goethals

GK	1	Sepp Maier
SW	5	Franz Beckenbauer (c)
CB	2	Horst-Dieter Höttges
CB	4	Hans-Georg Schwarzenbeck
RM	6	Herbert Wimmer
CM	10	Günter Netzer
CM	8	Uli Hoeneß	(substituted off) 59'
LM	3	Paul Breitner
RW	9	Jupp Heynckes
CF	13	Gerd Müller
LW	11	Erwin Kremers
Substitutions:
FW	7	Jürgen Grabowski	(substituted on) 59'
Manager:
Helmut Schön

== Third place play-off ==
17 June 1972
20:00

Hungary	1–2	Belgium
Kű 53' (pen.)	Report	Lambert 24'; Van Himst 28'

Stade Maurice Dufrasne, Liège
Attendance: 6,184
Referee: Johan Einar Boström (Sweden)

Hungary	Belgium

GK	1	István Géczi
SW	3	Miklós Páncsics (c)
CB	2	Tibor Fábián
CB	6	László Bálint
CB	4	Péter Juhász	Yellow card
CM	12	István Juhász
CM	24	Flórián Albert
CM	10	Lajos Kű
RW	20	Mihály Kozma
CF	15	Antal Dunai
LW	11	Sándor Zámbó		(substituted off) 46'
Substitutions:
FW	5	Lajos Szűcs		(substituted on) 46'
Manager:
Rudolf Illovszky

GK	1	Christian Piot
RB	2	Georges Heylens
CB	4	Jean Thissen
CB	5	Erwin Vandendaele
LB	3	Léon Dolmans	Yellow card
CM	11	Jan Verheyen
CM	6	Jean Dockx
CM	14	Odilon Polleunis
RW	7	Léon Semmeling
CF	9	Raoul Lambert
LW	10	Paul Van Himst (c)
Manager:
Raymond Goethals

== Final ==
18 June 1972
16:00

West Germany	3–0	Soviet Union
Müller 27', 58'; Wimmer 52'	Report

Heysel Stadium, Brussels
Attendance: 43,437
Referee: Ferdinand Marschall (Austria)

West Germany	Soviet Union

GK	1	Sepp Maier
SW	5	Franz Beckenbauer (c)
RB	2	Horst-Dieter Höttges
CB	4	Hans-Georg Schwarzenbeck
LB	3	Paul Breitner
DM	6	Herbert Wimmer
CM	8	Uli Hoeneß
CM	10	Günter Netzer	(yellow card) 44'
RW	9	Jupp Heynckes
LW	11	Erwin Kremers
CF	13	Gerd Müller
Manager:
Helmut Schön

GK	1	Yevhen Rudakov
RB	2	Revaz Dzodzuashvili
CB	3	Murtaz Khurtsilava (c)	(yellow card) 66'
CB	12	Volodymyr Kaplychnyi	(yellow card) 44'
LB	13	Yuriy Istomin
CM	7	Volodymyr Troshkin
CM	6	Viktor Kolotov
CM	14	Anatoliy Konkov		(substituted off) 46'
RW	8	Anatoly Baidachny
LW	18	Volodymyr Onyshchenko
CF	9	Anatoliy Banishevskiy		(substituted off) 66'
Substitutions:
MF	15	Oleg Dolmatov		(substituted on) 46'
FW	11	Eduard Kozynkevych		(substituted on) 66'
Manager:
Oleksandr Ponomarov

== See also ==
- Belgium at the UEFA European Championship
- Germany at the UEFA European Championship
- Hungary at the UEFA European Championship
- Soviet Union at the UEFA European Championship
