= 1969–70 European Cup =

European football tournament

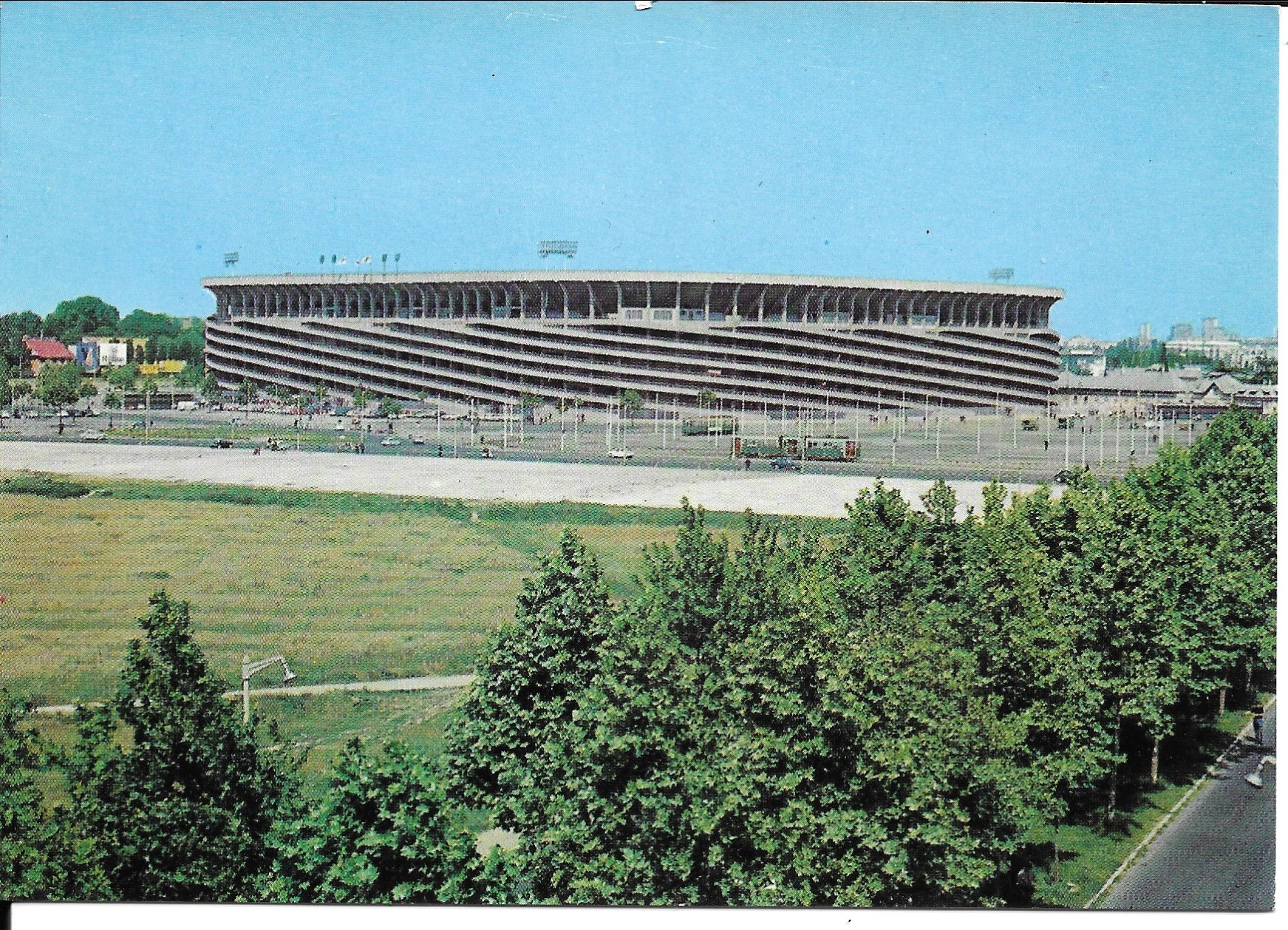
- The San Siro in Milan hosted the final.

Tournament details
- Dates: 21 August 1969 – 6 May 1970
- Teams: 33

Final positions
- Champions: (Netherlands) Feyenoord (1st title)
- Runners-up: (Scotland) Celtic

Tournament statistics
- Matches played: 63
- Goals scored: 204 (3.24 per match)
- Attendance: 2,046,074 (32,477 per match)
- Top scorer(s): Mick Jones (Leeds United); 8 goals

The 1969–70 European Cup was the 15th season of the European Cup, a club football tournament organised by UEFA for the domestic league champions of its member associations. It was won by Feyenoord of the Netherlands, who beat Scottish club Celtic after extra time in the final at San Siro in Milan on 6 May 1970. It was the first time the title had been won by a club from the Netherlands, and sparked a period of Dutch dominance in the competition, as Ajax won the next three titles.

For the first time in the European Cup, tiebreaker playoffs were abandoned in favour of the away goals rule; if both teams had scored the same number of away goals, one side was eliminated by the toss of a coin, something that was required in two of the matches (marked on the table below by "c/t").

Milan were the defending champions, but were eliminated by eventual champions Feyenoord in the second round.

== Teams ==
| (Albania) 17 Nëntori (1st) | Austria Wien (1st) | (Belgium) Standard Liège (1st) |
| (Bulgaria) CSKA September Flag (1st) | (Cyprus) Olympiakos Nicosia (1st) | (Czechoslovakia) Spartak Trnava (1st) |
| (Denmark) KB (1st) | (England) Leeds United (1st) | (Finland) TPS (1st) |
| (France) Saint-Étienne (1st) | (East Germany) Vorwärts Berlin (1st) | (West Germany) Bayern Munich (1st) |
| (Greece) Panathinaikos (1st) | (Hungary) Ferencváros (1st) | (Iceland) KR (1st) |
| (Republic of Ireland) Waterford (1st) | (Italy) Fiorentina (1st) | (Italy) Milan (3rd)^{TH} |
| (Luxembourg) Avenir Beggen (1st) | (Malta) Hibernians (1st) | (Netherlands) Feyenoord (1st) |
| (Northern Ireland) Linfield (1st) | (Norway) Lyn (1st) | (Poland) Legia Warsaw (1st) |
| (Portugal) Benfica (1st) | (Romania) UTA Arad (1st) | (Scotland) Celtic (1st) |
| (Spain) Real Madrid (1st) | (Sweden) Öster (1st) | (Switzerland) Basel (1st) |
| (Turkey) Galatasaray (1st) | (Soviet Union) Dynamo Kyiv (1st) | (Socialist Federal Republic of Yugoslavia) Red Star Belgrade (1st) |

== Preliminary round ==
| Team 1 | Agg. | Team 2 | 1st leg | 2nd leg |
|---|---|---|---|---|
| TPS (Finland) | 0–5 | (Denmark) Kjøbenhavns Boldklub | 0–1 | 0–4 |

=== First leg ===
21 August 1969

| TPS (Finland) | 0–1 | (Denmark) Kjøbenhavns Boldklub |
|---|---|---|
| | Report | Skouborg 58' |

Kupittaan jalkapallostadion, Turku
Attendance: 3,180
Referee: Tofik Bakhramov (Soviet Union)

=== Second leg ===
28 August 1969

| Kjøbenhavns Boldklub (Denmark) | 4–0 | (Finland) TPS |
|---|---|---|
| Skouborg 4', 42'; Brage 60'; Præst 87' | Report |

Københavns Idrætspark, Copenhagen
Attendance: 3,915
Referee: Bertil Lööw (Sweden)

Kjøbenhavns Boldklub won 5–0 on aggregate.

== Bracket ==
First round
(Malta) Hibernians | 2 | 0 | 2
(Czechoslovakia) Spartak Trnava | 2 | 4 | 6
(Turkey) Galatasaray | 2 | 3 | 5
(Republic of Ireland) Waterford | 0 | 2 | 2
(Romania) UTA Arad | 1 | 0 | 1
(Poland) Legia Warsaw | 2 | 8 | 10
(West Germany) Bayern Munich | 2 | 0 | 2
(France) Saint-Étienne | 0 | 3 | 3
(East Germany) Vorwärts Berlin | 2 | 1 | 3
(Greece) Panathinaikos | 0 | 1 | 1
(Socialist Federal Republic of Yugoslavia) Red Star Belgrade | 8 | 4 | 12
(Northern Ireland) Linfield | 0 | 2 | 2
(Italy) Milan | 5 | 3 | 8
(Luxembourg) Avenir Beggen | 0 | 0 | 0
(Iceland) KR | 2 | 0 | 2
(Netherlands) Feyenoord | 12 | 4 | 16
(Belgium) Standard Liège | 3 | 1 | 4
(Albania) 17 Nëntori | 0 | 1 | 1
(Cyprus) Olympiakos Nicosia | 0 | 1 | 1
(Spain) Real Madrid | 8 | 6 | 14
(England) Leeds United | 10 | 6 | 16
(Norway) Lyn | 0 | 0 | 0
(Bulgaria) CSKA September Flag | 2 | 1 | 3
(Hungary) Ferencváros | 1 | 4 | 5
(Switzerland) Basel | 0 | 0 | 0
(Scotland) Celtic | 0 | 2 | 2
(Portugal) Benfica | 2 | 3 | 5
(Denmark) Kjøbenhavns Boldklub | 0 | 2 | 2
Austria Wien | 1 | 1 | 2
(Soviet Union) Dynamo Kyiv | 2 | 3 | 5
(Italy) Fiorentina | 1 | 2 | 3
(Sweden) Öster | 0 | 1 | 1

Second round
(Czechoslovakia) Spartak Trnava | 1 | 0 | 1
(Turkey) Galatasaray (c/t) | 0 | 1 | 1
(Poland) Legia Warsaw | 2 | 1 | 3
(France) Saint-Étienne | 1 | 0 | 1
(East Germany) Vorwärts Berlin | 2 | 2 | 4
(Socialist Federal Republic of Yugoslavia) Red Star Belgrade | 1 | 3 | 4
(Italy) Milan | 1 | 0 | 1
(Netherlands) Feyenoord | 0 | 2 | 2
(Belgium) Standard Liège | 1 | 3 | 4
(Spain) Real Madrid | 0 | 2 | 2
(England) Leeds United | 3 | 3 | 6
(Hungary) Ferencváros | 0 | 0 | 0
(Scotland) Celtic (c/t) | 3 | 0 | 3
(Portugal) Benfica | 0 | 3 | 3
(Soviet Union) Dynamo Kyiv | 1 | 0 | 1
(Italy) Fiorentina | 2 | 0 | 2

Quarter-finals
(Turkey) Galatasaray | 1 | 0 | 1
(Poland) Legia Warsaw | 1 | 2 | 3
(East Germany) Vorwärts Berlin | 1 | 0 | 1
(Netherlands) Feyenoord | 0 | 2 | 2
(Belgium) Standard Liège | 0 | 0 | 0
(England) Leeds United | 1 | 1 | 2
(Scotland) Celtic | 3 | 0 | 3
(Italy) Fiorentina | 0 | 1 | 1

Semi-finals
(Poland) Legia Warsaw | 0 | 0 | 0
(Netherlands) Feyenoord | 0 | 2 | 2
(England) Leeds United | 0 | 1 | 1
(Scotland) Celtic | 1 | 2 | 3

Final
(Netherlands) Feyenoord (a.e.t) | 2
(Scotland) Celtic | 1

== First round ==
| Team 1 | Agg. | Team 2 | 1st leg | 2nd leg |
|---|---|---|---|---|
| Hibernians (Malta) | 2–6 | (Czechoslovakia) Spartak Trnava | 2–2 | 0–4 |
| Galatasaray (Turkey) | 5–2 | (Republic of Ireland) Waterford | 2–0 | 3–2 |
| UTA Arad (Romania) | 1–10 | (Poland) Legia Warsaw | 1–2 | 0–8 |
| Bayern Munich (West Germany) | 2–3 | (France) Saint-Étienne | 2–0 | 0–3 |
| Vorwärts Berlin (East Germany) | 3–1 | (Greece) Panathinaikos | 2–0 | 1–1 |
| Red Star Belgrade (Socialist Federal Republic of Yugoslavia) | 12–2 | (Northern Ireland) Linfield | 8–0 | 4–2 |
| Milan (Italy) | 8–0 | (Luxembourg) Avenir Beggen | 5–0 | 3–0 |
| KR (Iceland) | 2–16 | (Netherlands) Feyenoord | 2–12 | 0–4 |
| Standard Liège (Belgium) | 4–1 | (Albania) 17 Nëntori | 3–0 | 1–1 |
| Olympiakos Nicosia (Cyprus) | 1–14 | (Spain) Real Madrid | 0–8 | 1–6 |
| Leeds United (England) | 16–0 | (Norway) Lyn | 10–0 | 6–0 |
| CSKA September Flag (Bulgaria) | 3–5 | (Hungary) Ferencváros | 2–1 | 1–4 |
| Basel (Switzerland) | 0–2 | (Scotland) Celtic | 0–0 | 0–2 |
| Benfica (Portugal) | 5–2 | (Denmark) Kjøbenhavns Boldklub | 2–0 | 3–2 |
| Austria Wien | 2–5 | (Soviet Union) Dynamo Kyiv | 1–2 | 1–3 |
| Fiorentina (Italy) | 3–1 | (Sweden) Öster | 1–0 | 2–1 |

=== First leg ===
17 September 1969

| Hibernians (Malta) | 2–2 | (Czechoslovakia) Spartak Trnava |
|---|---|---|
| Cassar 57'; Bonello 80' | Report | Adamec 59'; Martinkovič 75' |

Empire Stadium, Gżira
Attendance: 8,675
Referee: Aurelio Angonese (Italy)

17 September 1969

| Galatasaray (Turkey) | 2–0 | (Republic of Ireland) Waterford |
|---|---|---|
| Özdenak 20', 43' | Report |

Mithat Paşa Stadyumu, Istanbul
Attendance: 12,300
Referee: Andrei Rădulescu (Romania)

17 September 1969

| UTA Arad (Romania) | 1–2 | (Poland) Legia Warsaw |
|---|---|---|
| Domide 8' | Report | Żmijewski 67'; Gadocha 75' |

Francisc von Neumann Stadium, Arad
Attendance: 12,781
Referee: Paul Schiller (Austria)

17 September 1969

| Bayern Munich (West Germany) | 2–0 | (France) Saint-Étienne |
|---|---|---|
| Brenninger 22'; Roth 53' | Report |

Grünwalder Stadion, Munich
Attendance: 38,275
Referee: Jim Finney (England)

17 September 1969

| Vorwärts Berlin (East Germany) | 2–0 | (Greece) Panathinaikos |
|---|---|---|
| Piepenburg 54', 63' | Report |

Walter-Ulbricht-Stadion, Berlin
Attendance: 11,022
Referee: John Adair (Northern Ireland)

17 September 1969

| Red Star Belgrade (Socialist Federal Republic of Yugoslavia) | 8–0 | (Northern Ireland) Linfield |
|---|---|---|
| Karasi 5', 30', 35'; Lazarević 9'; Klenkovski 25'; Aćimović 70'; Džajić 71', 81' | Report |

Stadion Crvena Zvezda, Belgrade
Attendance: 7,464
Referee: Michalakis Kiriakides (Cyprus)

10 September 1969

| Milan (Italy) | 5–0 | (Luxembourg) Avenir Beggen |
|---|---|---|
| Prati 15', 63'; Rivera 59' (pen.); Rognoni 61'; Combin 79' | Report |

San Siro, Milan
Attendance: 46,569
Referee: Goncho Rusev (Bulgaria)

17 September 1969

| KR (Iceland) | 2–12 | (Netherlands) Feyenoord |
|---|---|---|
| Baldvinsson 75'; Björnsson 83' | Report | Kindvall 3', 31', 65'; Romeijn 13'; Van Duivenbode 16'; Wery 25'; Geels 33', 62', 73', 88'; Van Hanegem 39', 87' |

Feijenoord Stadion, Rotterdam
Attendance: 54,656
Referee: John Carpenter (Republic of Ireland)

17 September 1969

| Standard Liège (Belgium) | 3–0 | (Albania) 17 Nëntori |
|---|---|---|
| Depireux 24', 42', 48' | Report |

Stade Maurice Dufrasne, Liège
Attendance: 16,837
Referee: Arthur Lentini (Malta)

24 September 1969

| Olympiakos Nicosia (Cyprus) | 0–8 | (Spain) Real Madrid |
|---|---|---|
| | Report | Amancio 5'; Gento 18'; Grosso 23', 55'; Fleitas 47', 52'; Grande 60'; Pirri 63' |

Santiago Bernabéu, Madrid
Attendance: 18,419
Referee: Aurel Bentu (Romania)

17 September 1969

| Leeds United (England) | 10–0 | (Norway) Lyn |
|---|---|---|
| O'Grady 1'; Jones 4', 9', 60'; Clarke 19', 47'; Giles 34', 51'; Bremner 65', 88' | Report |

Elland Road, Leeds
Attendance: 25,979
Referee: Bohumil Smejkal (Czechoslovakia)

17 September 1969

| CSKA September Flag (Bulgaria) | 2–1 | (Hungary) Ferencváros |
|---|---|---|
| Zhekov 9', 53' | Report | Rákosi 83' |

Narodna Army Stadium, Sofia
Attendance: 22,615
Referee: Alfred Ott (West Germany)

17 September 1969

| Basel (Switzerland) | 0–0 | (Scotland) Celtic |
|---|---|---|
| | Report |

St. Jakob Stadium, Basel
Attendance: 37,587
Referee: Rudolf Glöckner (East Germany)

17 September 1969

| Benfica (Portugal) | 2–0 | (Denmark) Kjøbenhavns Boldklub |
|---|---|---|
| Eusébio 39', 40' | Report |

Estádio da Luz, Lisbon
Attendance: 35,928
Referee: Robert Héliès (France)

17 September 1969
20:15

| Austria Wien | 1–2 | (Soviet Union) Dynamo Kyiv |
|---|---|---|
| Riedl 27' | Report | Serebryanikov 51'; Muntyan 58' |

Praterstadion, Vienna
Attendance: 60,746
Referee: Roger Mâchin (France)

17 September 1969

| Fiorentina (Italy) | 1–0 | (Sweden) Öster |
|---|---|---|
| Maraschi 65' | Report |

Stadio Comunale, Florence
Attendance: 36,840
Referee: Ertuğrul Dilek (Turkey)

=== Second leg ===
1 October 1969

| Spartak Trnava (Czechoslovakia) | 4–0 | (Malta) Hibernians |
|---|---|---|
| Hrušecký 12'; Adamec 64', 84'; Azzopardi 78' (o.g.) | Report |

Spartak Stadium, Trnava
Attendance: 9,612
Referee: Milivoje Gugulović (Yugoslavia)

Spartak Trnava won 6–2 on aggregate.

1 October 1969

| Waterford (Republic of Ireland) | 2–3 | (Turkey) Galatasaray |
|---|---|---|
| Buck 58'; Morley 74' | Report | Köken 29'; Özdenak 65'; Elmastaşoğlu 70' |

Lansdowne Road, Dublin
Attendance: 8,972
Referee: Kåre Sirevaag (Norway)

Galatasaray won 5–2 on aggregate.

1 October 1969

| Legia Warsaw (Poland) | 8–0 | (Romania) UTA Arad |
|---|---|---|
| Blaut 50'; Gadocha 70', 74'; Brychczy 73'; Stachurski 78'; Deyna 81'; Żmijewski 82'; Pieszko 85' (pen.) | Report |

Stadion Wojska Polskiego, Warsaw
Attendance: 7,665
Referee: Reino Koskinen (Finland)

Legia Warsaw won 10–1 on aggregate.

1 October 1969

| Saint-Étienne (France) | 3–0 | (West Germany) Bayern Munich |
|---|---|---|
| H. Revelli 2', 59'; Keïta 81' | Report |

Stade Geoffroy-Guichard, Saint-Étienne
Attendance: 33,716
Referee: Josef Krnávek (Czechoslovakia)

Saint-Étienne won 3–2 on aggregate.

1 October 1969

| Panathinaikos (Greece) | 1–1 | (East Germany) Vorwärts Berlin |
|---|---|---|
| Antoniadis 10' | Report | Laslop 82' |

Leoforos Alexandras Stadium, Athens
Attendance: 22,042
Referee: José María Ortiz de Mendíbil (Spain)

Vorwärts Berlin won 3–1 on aggregate.

1 October 1969

| Linfield (Northern Ireland) | 2–4 | (Socialist Federal Republic of Yugoslavia) Red Star Belgrade |
|---|---|---|
| McGraw 19', 36' | Report | Antonijević 44', 67', 72', 75' |

Windsor Park, Belfast
Attendance: 3,278
Referee: Kaj Rasmussen (Denmark)

Red Star Belgrade won 12–2 on aggregate.

24 September 1969

| Avenir Beggen (Luxembourg) | 0–3 | (Italy) Milan |
|---|---|---|
| | Report | Combin 19'; Sormani 73'; Rivera 89' |

Municipal Stadium, Luxembourg
Attendance: 10,454
Referee: Stanisław Eksztajn (Poland)

Milan won 8–0 on aggregate.

30 September 1969

| Feyenoord (Netherlands) | 4–0 | (Iceland) KR |
|---|---|---|
| Kindvall 11', 14'; Geels 65', 84' | Report |

Feijenoord Stadion, Rotterdam
Attendance: 37,917
Referee: Johan Einar Boström (Sweden)

Feyenoord won 16–2 on aggregate.

1 October 1969

| 17 Nëntori (Albania) | 1–1 | (Belgium) Standard Liège |
|---|---|---|
| Kazanxhi 90' | Report | Galić 66' |

Qemal Stafa Stadium, Tirana
Attendance: 22,010
Referee: Gerhard Schulenburg (West Germany)

Standard Liège won 4–1 on aggregate.

30 September 1969

| Real Madrid (Spain) | 6–1 | (Cyprus) Olympiakos Nicosia |
|---|---|---|
| De Diego 10', 74'; Planelles 20'; Grande 42'; Avramidis 51' (o.g.); Fleitas 87' | Report | Kettenis 26' |

Santiago Bernabéu, Madrid
Attendance: 14,420
Referee: Corneliu Niţescu (Romania)

Real Madrid won 14–1 on aggregate.

1 October 1969

| Lyn (Norway) | 0–6 | (England) Leeds United |
|---|---|---|
| | Report | Belfitt 6', 20'; Jones 30'; Hibbitt 54', 70'; Lorimer 67' |

Ullevaal Stadion, Oslo
Attendance: 7,595
Referee: Antoine Queudeville (Luxembourg)

Leeds United won 16–0 on aggregate.

1 October 1969

| Ferencváros (Hungary) | 4–1 | (Bulgaria) CSKA September Flag |
|---|---|---|
| Szőke 3', 83' (pen.); Branikovits 16'; Rákosi 60' | Report | Marashliev 27' |

Népstadion, Budapest
Attendance: 24,015
Referee: William Mullan (Scotland)

Ferencváros won 5–3 on aggregate.

1 October 1969

| Celtic (Scotland) | 2–0 | (Switzerland) Basel |
|---|---|---|
| Hood 1'; Gemmell 70' | Report |

Celtic Park, Glasgow
Attendance: 49,976
Referee: Gyula Emsberger (Hungary)

Celtic won 2–0 on aggregate.

1 October 1969

| Kjøbenhavns Boldklub (Denmark) | 2–3 | (Portugal) Benfica |
|---|---|---|
| Skouborg 30', 90' (pen.) | Report | Eusébio 1', 21'; Diamantino 4' |

Københavns Idrætspark, Copenhagen
Attendance: 31,528
Referee: Iorwerth Jones (Wales)

Benfica won 5–2 on aggregate.

1 October 1969
19:00

| Dynamo Kyiv (Soviet Union) | 3–1 | Austria Wien |
|---|---|---|
| Muntyan 47'; Byshovets 86'; Puzach 88' | Report | Parits 18' |

Central Stadium, Kyiv
Attendance: 75,206
Referee: Lado Jakše (Yugoslavia)

Dynamo Kyiv won 5–2 on aggregate.

1 October 1969

| Öster (Sweden) | 1–2 | (Italy) Fiorentina |
|---|---|---|
| Fjordestam 5' | Report | Amarildo 43'; Esposito 71' |

Värendsvallen, Växjö
Attendance: 13,612
Referee: Arie van Gemert (Netherlands)

Fiorentina won 3–1 on aggregate.

== Second round ==
| Team 1 | Agg. | Team 2 | 1st leg | 2nd leg |
|---|---|---|---|---|
| Spartak Trnava (Czechoslovakia) | 1–1 (c/t) | (Turkey) Galatasaray | 1–0 | 0–1 |
| Legia Warsaw (Poland) | 3–1 | (France) Saint-Étienne | 2–1 | 1–0 |
| Vorwärts Berlin (East Germany) | 4–4 (a) | (Socialist Federal Republic of Yugoslavia) Red Star Belgrade | 2–1 | 2–3 |
| Milan (Italy) | 1–2 | (Netherlands) Feyenoord | 1–0 | 0–2 |
| Standard Liège (Belgium) | 4–2 | (Spain) Real Madrid | 1–0 | 3–2 |
| Leeds United (England) | 6–0 | (Hungary) Ferencváros | 3–0 | 3–0 |
| Celtic (Scotland) | 3–3 (c/t) | (Portugal) Benfica | 3–0 | 0–3 |
| Dynamo Kyiv (Soviet Union) | 1–2 | (Italy) Fiorentina | 1–2 | 0–0 |

=== First leg ===
12 November 1969

| Spartak Trnava (Czechoslovakia) | 1–0 | (Turkey) Galatasaray |
|---|---|---|
| Kabát 53' | Report |

Spartak Stadium, Trnava
Attendance: 11,202
Referee: William Mullan (Scotland)

12 November 1969

| Legia Warsaw (Poland) | 2–1 | (France) Saint-Étienne |
|---|---|---|
| Pieszko 78'; Deyna 82' | Report | H. Revelli 38' |

Stadion Wojska Polskiego, Warsaw
Attendance: 11,647
Referee: Vital Loraux (Belgium)

12 November 1969

| Vorwärts Berlin (East Germany) | 2–1 | (Socialist Federal Republic of Yugoslavia) Red Star Belgrade |
|---|---|---|
| Fräßdorf 31'; Begerad 67' | Report | Antonijević 15' |

Friedrich-Ludwig-Jahn-Sportpark, Berlin
Attendance: 7,000
Referee: Thomas Wharton (Scotland)

12 November 1969

| Milan (Italy) | 1–0 | (Netherlands) Feyenoord |
|---|---|---|
| Combin 9' | Report |

San Siro, Milan
Attendance: 17,037
Referee: Hans-Joachim Weyland (West Germany)

19 November 1969

| Standard Liège (Belgium) | 1–0 | (Spain) Real Madrid |
|---|---|---|
| Kostedde 42' | Report |

Stade Maurice Dufrasne, Liège
Attendance: 34,310
Referee: Eric Jennings (England)

12 November 1969

| Leeds United (England) | 3–0 | (Hungary) Ferencváros |
|---|---|---|
| Giles 1'; Jones 13', 35' | Report |

Elland Road, Leeds
Attendance: 37,291
Referee: Tofik Bakhramov (Soviet Union)

12 November 1969

| Celtic (Scotland) | 3–0 | (Portugal) Benfica |
|---|---|---|
| Gemmell 2'; Wallace 14'; Hood 70' | Report |

Celtic Park, Glasgow
Attendance: 74,894
Referee: Concetto Lo Bello (Italy)

12 November 1969
19:00

| Dynamo Kyiv (Soviet Union) | 1–2 | (Italy) Fiorentina |
|---|---|---|
| Serebryanikov 57' | Report | Chiarugi 36'; Maraschi 69' |

Central Stadium, Kyiv
Attendance: 84,238
Referee: Johan Einar Boström (Sweden)

=== Second leg ===
26 November 1969

| Galatasaray (Turkey) | 1–0 (a.e.t.) | (Czechoslovakia) Spartak Trnava |
|---|---|---|
| Acuner 63' | Report |

Mithat Paşa Stadyumu, Istanbul
Attendance: 25,879
Referee: Gaspar Pintado Viu (Spain)

1–1 on aggregate; Galatasaray progressed on a coin toss.

24 November 1969

| Saint-Étienne (France) | 0–1 | (Poland) Legia Warsaw |
|---|---|---|
| | Report | Deyna 85' |

Stade Geoffroy-Guichard, Saint-Étienne
Attendance: 38,309
Referee: Corneliu Niţescu (Romania)

Legia Warsaw won 3–1 on aggregate.

26 November 1969

| Red Star Belgrade (Socialist Federal Republic of Yugoslavia) | 3–2 | (East Germany) Vorwärts Berlin |
|---|---|---|
| Karasi 35', 64'; Aćimović 60' | Report | Begerad 12', 56' |

Red Stad Stadium, Belgrade
Attendance: 8,407
Referee: Joseph Franciscus Dorpmans (Netherlands)

4–4 on aggregate; Vorwärts Berlin won on away goals.

26 November 1969

| Feyenoord (Netherlands) | 2–0 | (Italy) Milan |
|---|---|---|
| Jansen 6'; Van Hanegem 82' | Report |

Feijenoord Stadion, Rotterdam
Attendance: 62,806
Referee: Joaquim Fernandes Campos (Portugal)

Feyenoord won 2–1 on aggregate.

3 December 1969

| Real Madrid (Spain) | 2–3 | (Belgium) Standard Liège |
|---|---|---|
| Velázquez 20'; Gento 47' (pen.) | Report | Pilot 8'; Depireux 25'; Galić 69' |

Santiago Bernabéu, Madrid
Attendance: 80,000
Referee: Anton Bucheli (Switzerland)

Standard Liège won 4–2 on aggregate.

26 November 1969

| Ferencváros (Hungary) | 0–3 | (England) Leeds United |
|---|---|---|
| | Report | Jones 35', 87'; Lorimer 67' |

Népstadion, Budapest
Attendance: 5,620
Referee: José María Ortiz de Mendíbil (Spain)

Leeds United won 6–0 on aggregate.

26 November 1969

| Benfica (Portugal) | 3–0 (a.e.t.) | (Scotland) Celtic |
|---|---|---|
| Eusébio 35'; Graça 40'; Diamantino 90' | Report |

Estádio da Luz, Lisbon
Attendance: 49,601
Referee: Laurens van Ravens (Netherlands)

3–3 on aggregate; Celtic progressed on a coin toss.

26 November 1969
19:00

| Fiorentina (Italy) | 0–0 | (Soviet Union) Dynamo Kyiv |
|---|---|---|
| | Report |

Stadio Comunale, Florence
Attendance: 28,726
Referee: Ferdinand Marschall (Austria)

Fiorentina won 2–1 on aggregate.

== Quarter-finals ==
| Team 1 | Agg. | Team 2 | 1st leg | 2nd leg |
|---|---|---|---|---|
| Galatasaray (Turkey) | 1–3 | (Poland) Legia Warsaw | 1–1 | 0–2 |
| Vorwärts Berlin (East Germany) | 1–2 | (Netherlands) Feyenoord | 1–0 | 0–2 |
| Standard Liège (Belgium) | 0–2 | (England) Leeds United | 0–1 | 0–1 |
| Celtic (Scotland) | 3–1 | (Italy) Fiorentina | 3–0 | 0–1 |

=== First leg ===
4 March 1970

| Galatasaray (Turkey) | 1–1 | (Poland) Legia Warsaw |
|---|---|---|
| Elmastaşoğlu 47' | Report | Brychczy 37' |

Mithat Paşa Stadyumu, Istanbul
Attendance: 30,635
Referee: Roger Mâchin (France)

4 March 1970

| Vorwärts Berlin (East Germany) | 1–0 | (Netherlands) Feyenoord |
|---|---|---|
| Piepenburg 59' | Report |

Walter-Ulbricht-Stadion, Berlin
Attendance: 19,500
Referee: Iorwerth Jones (Wales)

4 March 1970

| Standard Liège (Belgium) | 0–1 | (England) Leeds United |
|---|---|---|
| | Report | Lorimer 70' |

Stade Maurice Dufrasne, Liège
Attendance: 30,143
Referee: António Saldanha Ribeiro (Portugal)

4 March 1970

| Celtic (Scotland) | 3–0 | (Italy) Fiorentina |
|---|---|---|
| Auld 30'; Carpenetti 70' (o.g.); Wallace 89' | Report |

Celtic Park, Glasgow
Attendance: 77,240
Referee: Gaspar Pintado Viu (Spain)

=== Second leg ===
18 March 1970

| Legia Warsaw (Poland) | 2–0 | (Turkey) Galatasaray |
|---|---|---|
| Brychczy 10', 55' | Report |

Stadion Wojska Polskiego, Warsaw
Attendance: 18,374
Referee: Jim Finney (England)

Legia Warsaw won 3–1 on aggregate.

18 March 1970

| Feyenoord (Netherlands) | 2–0 | (East Germany) Vorwärts Berlin |
|---|---|---|
| Kindvall 47'; Wery 69' | Report |

Feijenoord Stadion, Rotterdam
Attendance: 62,806
Referee: Josef Krňávek (Czechoslovakia)

Feyenoord won 2–1 on aggregate.

18 March 1970

| Leeds United (England) | 1–0 | (Belgium) Standard Liège |
|---|---|---|
| Giles 80' (pen.) | Report |

Elland Road, Leeds
Attendance: 48,775
Referee: Concetto Lo Bello (Italy)

Leeds United won 2–0 on aggregate.

18 March 1970

| Fiorentina (Italy) | 1–0 | (Scotland) Celtic |
|---|---|---|
| Chiarugi 37' | Report |

Stadio Comunale, Florence
Attendance: 35,544
Referee: Rudolf Scheurer (Switzerland)

Celtic won 3–1 on aggregate.

== Semi-finals ==
| Team 1 | Agg. | Team 2 | 1st leg | 2nd leg |
|---|---|---|---|---|
| Legia Warsaw (Poland) | 0–2 | (Netherlands) Feyenoord | 0–0 | 0–2 |
| Leeds United (England) | 1–3 | (Scotland) Celtic | 0–1 | 1–2 |

=== First leg ===
1 April 1970

| Legia Warsaw (Poland) | 0–0 | (Netherlands) Feyenoord |
|---|---|---|
| | Report |

Stadion Wojska Polskiego, Warsaw
Attendance: 23,760
Referee: Francesco Francescon (Italy)

1 April 1970

| Leeds United (England) | 0–1 | (Scotland) Celtic |
|---|---|---|
| | Report | Connelly 1' |

Elland Road, Leeds
Attendance: 46,381
Referee: Gerhard Schulenburg (West Germany)

=== Second leg ===
15 April 1970

| Feyenoord (Netherlands) | 2–0 | (Poland) Legia Warsaw |
|---|---|---|
| Van Hanegem 3'; Hasil 30' | Report |

Feijenoord Stadion, Rotterdam
Attendance: 62,995
Referee: Kevin Howley (England)

Feyenoord won 2–0 on aggregate.

15 April 1970

| Celtic (Scotland) | 2–1 | (England) Leeds United |
|---|---|---|
| Hughes 47'; Murdoch 51' | Report; Report | Bremner 14' |

Hampden Park, Glasgow
Attendance: 136,505 (Note: Highest attendance for a UEFA club competition match (having been moved from Celtic Park).)
Referee: Michel Kitabdjian (France)

Celtic won 3–1 on aggregate.

== Final ==
6 May 1970

| Feyenoord (Netherlands) | 2–1 (a.e.t.) | (Scotland) Celtic |
|---|---|---|
| Israël 31'; Kindvall 117' | Report | Gemmell 29' |

San Siro, Milan
Attendance: 53,187
Referee: Concetto Lo Bello (Italy)

== Top scorers ==
The top scorers from the 1969–70 European Cup (excluding preliminary round) are as follows:

| Rank | Name | Team | Goals |
|---|---|---|---|
| 1 | (England) Mick Jones | (England) Leeds United | 8 |
| 2 | (Sweden) Ove Kindvall | (Netherlands) Feyenoord | 7 |
| 3 | (Netherlands) Ruud Geels | (Netherlands) Feyenoord | 6 |
| 4 | (Socialist Federal Republic of Yugoslavia) Zoran Antonijević | (Socialist Federal Republic of Yugoslavia) Red Star Belgrade | 5 |
| 4 | (Portugal) Eusébio | (Portugal) Benfica | 5 |
| 4 | (Socialist Federal Republic of Yugoslavia) Stanislav Karasi | (Socialist Federal Republic of Yugoslavia) Red Star Belgrade | 5 |
| 7 | (Czechoslovakia) Jozef Adamec | (Czechoslovakia) Spartak Trnava | 4 |
| 7 | (Poland) Lucjan Brychczy | (Poland) Legia Warsaw | 4 |
| 7 | (Belgium) Henri Depireux | (Belgium) Standard Liège | 4 |
| 7 | (Republic of Ireland) Johnny Giles | (England) Leeds United | 4 |
| 7 | (Netherlands) Willem van Hanegem | (Netherlands) Feyenoord | 4 |
