= Jan Verheyen =

Jan Verheyen may refer to:

- Jan Verheyen (footballer), Belgian retired footballer
- Jan Verheyen (director), Belgian film director of e.g. Dossier K.
