= List of Vasas SC managers =

Vasas Sport Club is a professional football club based in Budapest, Hungary.

== Managers ==
Manager	Nationality	From	To	P	W	D	L	GF	GA	Win	Honours	Notes
Vilmos Kertész	Hungary	1926	1930									
Tibor Gallowich	Hungary	1941	1943									
Tibor Gallowich	Hungary	1945										
Béla Guttmann	Hungary	1945										
Tibor Gallowich	Hungary	1948										
Rudolf Jeny	Hungary	1951	1952									
Lajos Baróti	Hungary	1953	1957									
Rudolf Illovszky	Hungary	1957	1963									
Rudolf Illovszky	Hungary	1965										
Lajos Csordás	Hungary	1966	1967									
Rudolf Illovszky	Hungary	1967	1969									
József Albert	Hungary	1970										
Ferenc Machos	Hungary	1970	1972									
Lajos Baróti	Hungary	1972	1974									
Rudolf Illovszky	Hungary	1974	1977									
Kálmán Mészöly	Hungary	1978	1980									
Dezső Bundzsák	Hungary	1980	1982									
Kálmán Mészöly	Hungary	1983	1984									
Rudolf Illovszky	Hungary	1984	1986									
István Kisteleki	Hungary	1986	1988									
Kálmán Mészöly	Hungary	1988	1989									
Imre Gellei	Hungary	1991	1992									
Kálmán Mészöly	Hungary	1993	1994									
Rudolf Illovszky	Hungary	1995										
Imre Gellei	Hungary	1995	1999									
András Komjáti	Hungary	1999	2000									
György Mezey	Hungary	July 2000	November 2000									
Péter Bozsik	Hungary	2001										
András Komjáti	Hungary	2001										
László Kiss	Hungary	January 2002	April 2002									
Barnabás Tornyi	Hungary	April 2002										2)
Sándor Egervári	Hungary	2004	2005									
Attila Pintér	Hungary	December 2005										
Géza Mészöly	Hungary	2006	2009									
Giovanni Dellacasa	Italy	2009	2010									
András Komjáti	Hungary	7 October 2010	15 August 2011	29	9	7	13	29	49			
Marijan Vlak	Croatia	2011	2012									
Flórián Urbán	Hungary	2012	2012									
Marijan Vlak	Croatia	April 2012	June 2012									
Quim Machado	Portugal	1 July 2012	1 October 2012	7	2	3	2	5	6			
Gábor Szapor	Hungary	10 October 2012	8 January 2013	9	7	0	2	17	9			
Dirk Berger	Germany	9 January 2013	29 November 2013	33	14	3	16	50	58			
Károly Szanyó	Hungary	4 January 2014	19 October 2015	56	34	6	16	115	59			
Antal Simon (caretaker)	Hungary	19 October 2015	1 January 2016	9	2	0	6	14	22			
Michael Oenning	Germany	2 January 2016	30 June 2018	94	37	18	39	141	146			
Károly Kis	Hungary	27 June 2018	5 November 2018	17	6	8	3	30	28			
István Ferenczi (caretaker)	Hungary	2018										
Károly Szanyó	Hungary	12 November 2018	23 December 2019	45	25	6	14	96	74			
Ferenc Bene jr.	Hungary	3 January 2020	8 September 2020									
Szabolcs Schindler	Hungary	8 September 2020	30 May 2021	34	23							
Attila Kuttor	Hungary	2 June 2021	6 September 2022	48	27	15	6	90	33			
Elemér Kondás	Hungary	6 September 2022	6 April 2023	23	7	5	11	23	33			
Szilárd Desits (interim)		6 April 2023	14 June 2023									
Szilárd Desits		15 June 2023	26 February 2024	24	13	8	3	54	23			
Zoltán Gera	Hungary	27 February 2024	21 August 2024	17	10	3	4	30	20			
Attila Pintér	Hungary	6 September 2024	4 June 2025	25	13	3	9	43	33			
Gábor Erős	Hungary	5 June 2026										
