= List of Vasas SC records and statistics =

Vasas Sport Club is a professional football club based in Budapest, Hungary.

== Team ==
- Most points in a season: 64 (1996–97 and 1997–98) (3-point system)
- Most goals in a season: 100 (1976–77)

== Player ==
=== Most capped players ===
- (Hungary) András Komjáti (443)
- (Hungary) Pál Berendy (382)
- (Hungary) Kálmán Ihász (364)

=== Players with most international appearances ===
- (Hungary) Kálmán Mészöly (61)
- (Hungary) László Sárosi (45)
- (Hungary) Béla Várady (36)

=== Top Goalscorer ===
- (Hungary) Gyula Szilágyi (295)
