= Léon Dolmans =

Belgian footballer

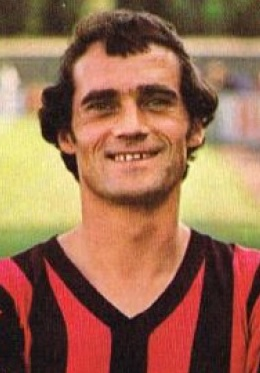
Léon Dolmans in 1976

Léon Dolmans (born 6 April 1945 in Uikhoven) is a retired Belgian footballer.

During his career he played for R. Standard de Liège. He earned 10 caps for the Belgium national football team, and participated in UEFA Euro 1972.

== Honours ==
=== Player ===
Standard Liège

- Belgian First Division: 1970–71
- Belgian League Cup: 1975
- Jules Pappaert Cup: 1971

=== International ===
==== Belgium ====
- UEFA European Championship: 1972 (Third place)
