= Henk Wery =

Dutch footballer

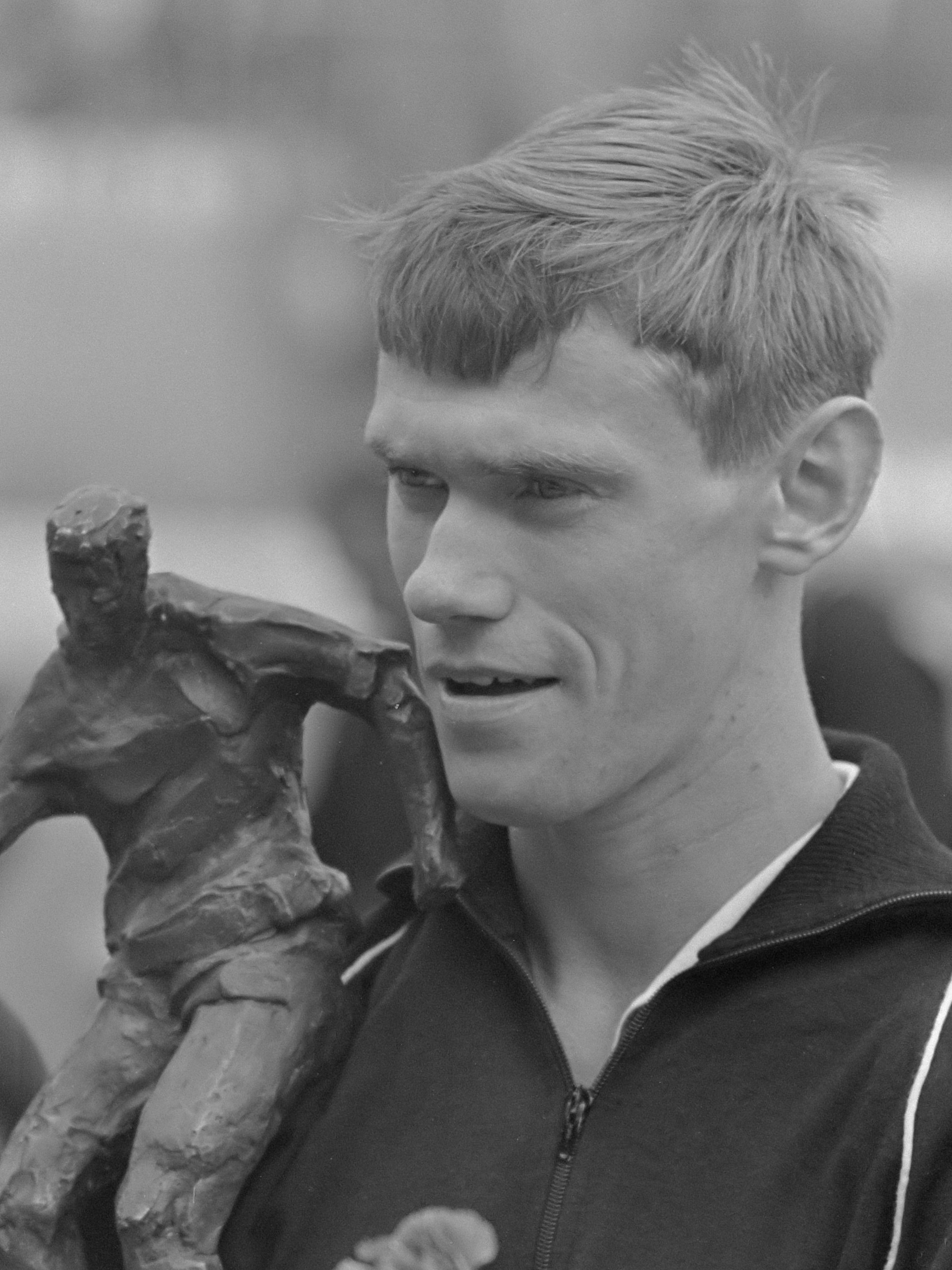

Personal information
- Full name: Hendrik Wery
- Date of birth: June 10, 1943 (age 83)
- Place of birth: Amersfoort, Netherlands
- Position: Forward

Youth career
- Amersfoortse Boys
- HVC

Senior career*
Years	Team	Apps	(Gls)
1963–1964	DWS	15	(2)
1965–1968	DOS	127	(52)
1968–1974	Feijenoord	173	(49)
1974–1976	FC Utrecht	52	(11)

International career^{‡}
1967–1973	Netherlands	12	(3)
- * Club domestic league appearances and goals as of 6 June 2007 ‡ National team caps and goals as of 6 June 2007

Henk Wery (born 10 June 1943) is a Dutch former footballer who played for Feyenoord and was part of their European Cup victory in 1970. He earned 12 caps and scored 3 goals for the Netherlands national football team.
