= Imre Rapp =

Hungarian footballer

Imre Rapp (15 September 1937 − 3 June 2015) was a Hungarian football goalkeeper, who played for Pécsi Mecsek FC.

He participated in UEFA Euro 1972 for the Hungary national football team.
