= 1968–69 Irish League =

Irish League
- Season: 1968–69
- Champions: Linfield; 28th Irish title
- Matches played: 132
- Goals scored: 478 (3.62 per match)
- Top goalscorer: Danny Hale (21 goals)

Location of teams in the Irish League from 1949–1972
Location of Belfast-based teams in the Irish League from 1949–1971

The 1968–69 Irish League was the 68th edition of the Irish League, the highest level of league competition in Northern Irish football. The league consisted of 12 teams, and Linfield won the championship.

== League standings ==
Pos	Team	Pld	W	D	L	GF	GA	GR	Pts	Qualification
1	Linfield	22	17	1	4	61	19	3.211	35	European Cup first round and Inter-Cities Fairs Cup
2	Derry City	22	15	2	5	57	27	2.111	32	
3	Glentoran	22	13	4	5	42	22	1.909	30	
4	Coleraine	22	13	3	6	43	30	1.433	29	
5	Ards	22	12	5	5	48	34	1.412	29	Qualification for the European Cup Winners' Cup first round
6	Crusaders	22	12	5	5	47	34	1.382	29	
7	Ballymena United	22	9	5	8	48	41	1.171	23	
8	Distillery	22	6	4	12	39	51	0.765	16	
9	Glenavon	22	6	2	14	32	52	0.615	14	
10	Bangor	22	5	2	15	22	51	0.431	12	
11	Cliftonville	22	3	5	14	24	58	0.414	11	
12	Portadown	22	2	0	20	15	59	0.254	4	

Source: rsssf.com

== Results ==
Home \ Away	ARD	BAN	BLM	CLI	COL	CRU	DIS	DER	GLV	GLT	LIN	POR
Ards		2–0	4–3	1–0	3–1	1–1	3–1	2–1	4–1	1–2	1–2	5–2
Bangor	0–3		1–1	0–1	2–4	1–3	4–3	0–2	2–3	0–2	0–2	2–1
Ballymena United	1–4	3–0		2–1	5–0	1–3	2–1	5–3	1–1	2–2	1–2	3–2
Cliftonville	3–3	2–2	0–3		0–5	1–3	1–2	2–2	0–4	1–3	0–2	0–2
Coleraine	3–3	2–0	1–6	2–0		1–1	5–2	1–2	2–0	2–1	0–1	4–0
Crusaders	3–3	2–0	2–1	2–2	0–1		1–2	4–1	1–0	1–1	0–4	3–1
Distillery	1–2	5–1	2–2	1–1	2–2	3–6		0–4	3–0	1–2	3–7	3–0
Derry City	3–0	3–0	5–1	6–0	0–1	4–1	3–2		4–1	2–1	2–1	4–0
Glenavon	1–2	1–2	2–2	3–5	2–1	2–4	4–0	0–2		1–2	1–5	3–0
Glentoran	1–1	1–2	2–1	4–0	0–1	0–2	1–0	1–1	7–1		2–1	2–0
Linfield	3–0	4–1	3–1	4–1	0–1	3–0	0–0	3–1	3–0	1–3		8–1
Portadown	1–0	1–2	0–1	2–3	0–3	1–4	0–2	1–2	0–1	0–2	0–2	

Source: Irish League Archive
Legend: Blue = home team win; Yellow = draw; Red = away team win.
