= Luc Sanders =

Belgian footballer

Luc Sanders (born 6 October 1945 in Bruges) is a retired Belgian footballer. During his career he played for Cercle Brugge K.S.V., Club Brugge K.V., V.G. Oostende, and K.A.A. Gent. He earned 1 cap for the Belgium national football team, and participated in UEFA Euro 1972.

== Honours ==
=== Player ===
Club Brugge

- Belgian First Division: 1972–73
- Belgian Cup: 1969–70
- Jules Pappaert Cup: 1972

=== International ===
==== Belgium ====
- UEFA European Championship:Third place: 1972,
