= Tibor Fábián =

Hungarian footballer

Personal information
- Date of birth: 26 July 1946
- Place of birth: Budapest, Hungary
- Date of death: 6 June 2006 (aged 59)
- Place of death: Budapest, Hungary

International career
Years	Team	Apps	(Gls)
1971-74	Hungary	16	(0)

Tibor Fábián (26 July 1946 – 6 June 2006) was a Hungarian football defender, who played for Vasas SC.

He participated in UEFA Euro 1972 for the Hungary national football team. He made 16 appearances for Hungary from 1971 to 1974.
