= Erwin Vandendaele =

Belgian footballer (1945–2026)

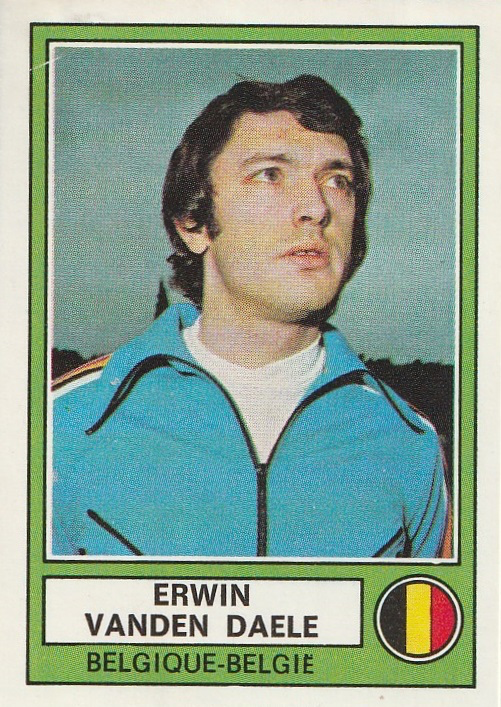
- Vandendaele in 1978

Personal information
- Date of birth: 5 March 1945
- Place of birth: Lauchheim, Germany
- Date of death: 21 July 2026 (aged 81)
- Height: 1.80 m (5 ft 11 in)
- Positions: Midfielder; central defender

Senior career*
Years	Team	Apps	(Gls)
1964–1974	Club Brugge	253	(12)
1974–1977	Anderlecht	92	(1)
1977–1978	Reims	29	(1)
1978–1980	Gent	44	(0)
1980-1981	R. Union Sportive Tournaisienne	24	(0)

International career
1970–1977	Belgium	32	(1)

Managerial career
- 1981–1982: R. Union Sportive Tournaisienne
- 1983–1984: Gent
- 1988: R.W.D. Molenbeek
- 1988–1989: Gent
- * Club domestic league appearances and goals

Erwin Vandendaele (5 March 1945 – 21 July 2026) was a Belgian professional footballer who played as a midfielder or central defender. He won the Belgian Golden Shoe in 1971 while at Club Brugge. He made 32 appearances for the Belgium national team between 1970 and 1977, starting in a 2–1 friendly defeat to France on 15 November 1970.

In the summer of 1974 Vandendaele moved to the rival Anderlecht. In 1976, he won the UEFA Super Cup with Anderlecht after a 4–1 win in the second leg over Bayern Munich. After his football career, Vandendaele founded a tennis club in his hometown Asper. From 2005, he worked as a talent scout for Gent.

Vandendaele died on 21 July 2026, at the age of 81.

== Honours ==
Club Brugge

- Belgian First Division: 1972–73
- Belgian Cup: 1967–68, 1969–70

Anderlecht

- Belgian Cup: 1974–75, 1975–76
- European Cup Winners' Cup: 1975–76, 1977–78, runner-up 1976–77
- Amsterdam Tournament: 1976
- Tournoi de Paris: 1977
- Jules Pappaert Cup: 1977

Gent

- Belgian Second Division: 1979–80

Belgium

- UEFA European Championship third place: 1972

Individual

- Belgian Golden Shoe: 1971
- Platina Eleven (Best Team in 50 Years of Golden Shoe Winners) (2003)
