= Jean Dockx =

Belgian footballer (1941–2002)

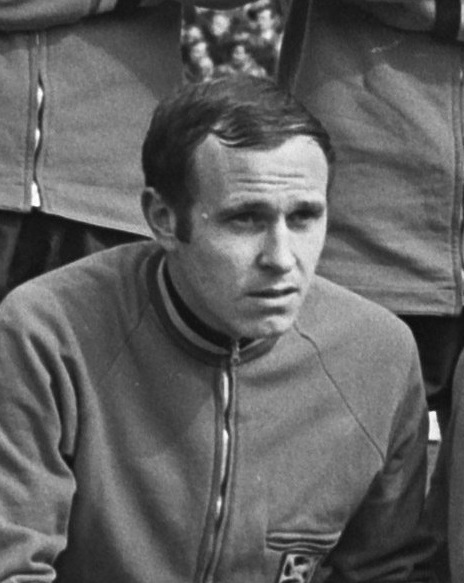
- Dockx in 1968

Personal information
- Full name: Jean Baptiste Dockx
- Date of birth: 24 May 1941
- Place of birth: Sint-Katelijne-Waver, Belgium
- Date of death: 15 January 2002 (aged 60)
- Place of death: Vilvoorde, Belgium
- Height: 1.74 m (5 ft 9 in)
- Position: Midfielder

Youth career
- 1952–1957: Mechelen

Senior career*
Years	Team	Apps	(Gls)
1957–1966	Mechelen	177	(28)
1966–1971	Racing White	141	(33)
1971–1978	Anderlecht	214	(12)
Total		532	(73)

International career
1967–1975	Belgium	35	(3)

Managerial career
- 1978–1981: Bornem
- 1981–1982: Assent
- 1982–1983: RWD Molenbeek
- 1983–1984: Royal Antwerp
- 1999: Anderlecht
- * Club domestic league appearances and goals

Jean Baptiste Dockx (24 May 1941 – 15 January 2002) was a Belgian footballer who played as a midfielder for Mechelen, Racing White and Anderlecht, and also for the Belgium national team in the 1970 FIFA World Cup and the 1972 UEFA European Football Championship. He was later a manager, and was caretaker manager of Anderlecht in 1999.

On 15 January 2002, Dockx died unexpectedly at the age of 60 from a traumatic aortic rupture. Anderlecht paid a lot of attention to his death and praised him as one of the most valuable players the club had ever had.

In 2005 he was nominated for the title De Grootste Belg (The Greatest Belgian), but did not make it to the final nomination list. He ended up in place 401 of those who fell outside the final nomination list.

== Honours ==
Mechelen

- Belgian Second Division: 1962–63

Anderlecht

- Belgian First Division: 1971–72, 1973–74
- Belgian Cup: 1971–72, 1972–73, 1974–75, 1975–76
- Belgian League Cup: 1973, 1974
- European Cup Winners' Cup: 1975–76, 1977–78; runner-up 1976–77
- European Super Cup: 1976
- Amsterdam Tournament: 1976
- Tournoi de Paris: 1977
- Jules Pappaert Cup: 1977
- Belgian Sports Merit Award: 1978

Belgium

- UEFA European Championship third place: 1972
