= William Mullan =

Scottish football referee

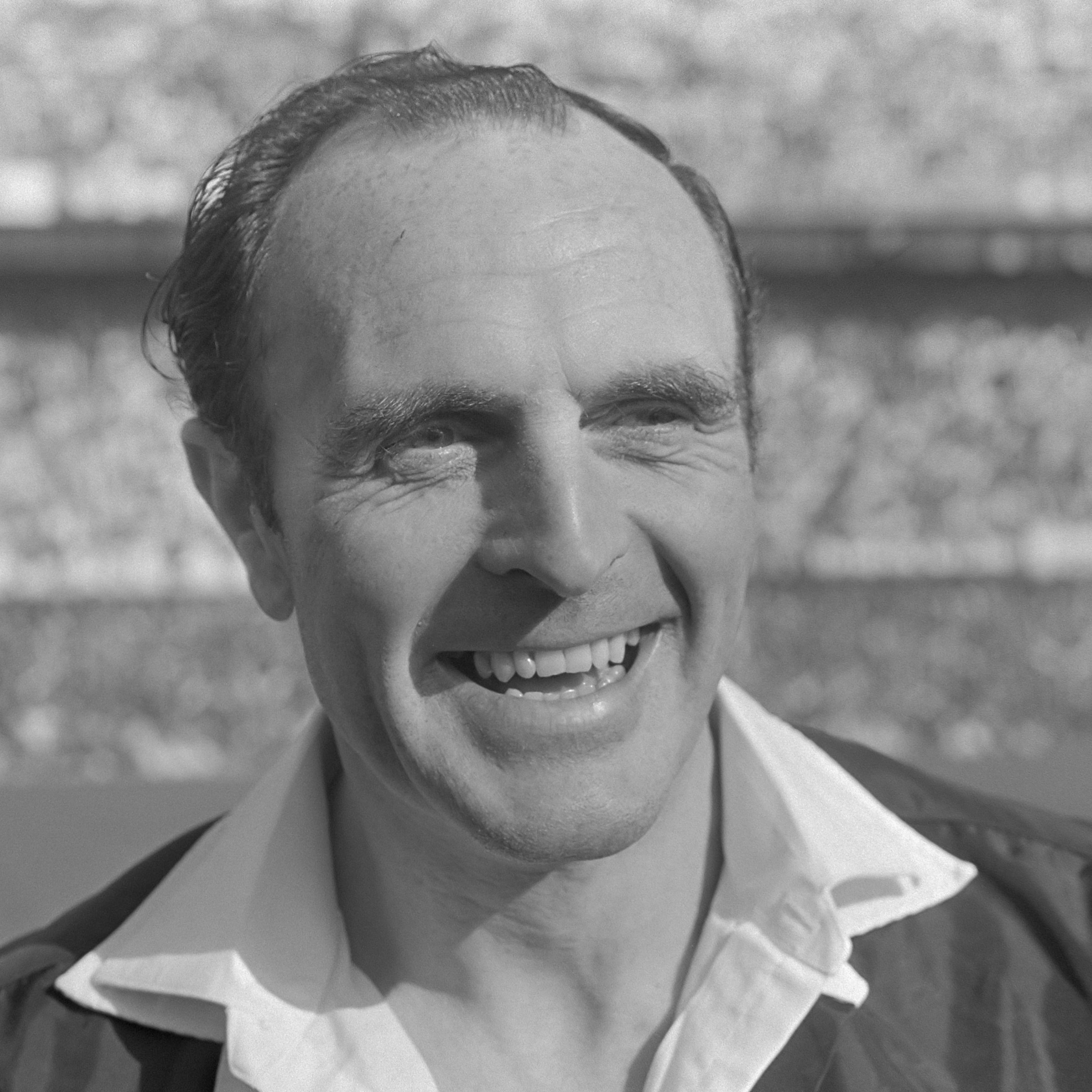
- Mullan in 1970
- Full name: William Joseph Mullan
- Born: 30 March 1928; Dublin, Ireland
- Died: 13 November 2018 (aged 90); Edinburgh, Scotland

Domestic
Years	League	Role
1962–1973	Scottish Division One	Referee

International
Years	League	Role
1965–1973	FIFA listed	Referee

William Joseph Mullan (30 March 1928 – 13 November 2018) was a Scottish football referee.

== Refereeing career ==
In 1962, Mullan became a referee in the Scottish Division One. Three years later, he was appointed as a FIFA referee.

In 1972, Mullan was selected as a referee for UEFA Euro 1972, where he officiated a semi-final match between Belgium and West Germany.

Later that year, Mullan was selected as a referee for the Summer Olympics in West Germany, where he officiated two matches, both in Munchen: Hungary – Brazil 2-2 (29 August) and F.R. Germany – German Democratic Republic 2-3 (8 September).

In 1973, Mullan retired from refereeing.

== Death ==
Mullan died on 13 November 2018 in Edinburgh, Scotland at the age of 90.
