= Rudolf Illovszky =

Hungarian footballer

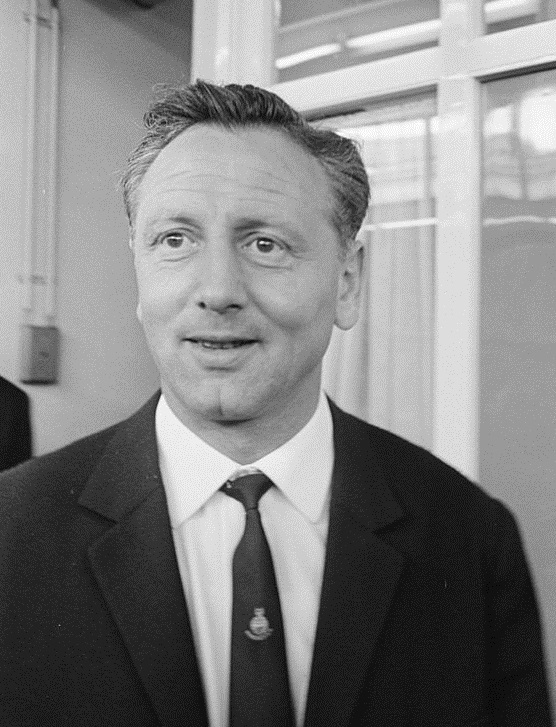
- Illovszky in 1966

Personal information
- Date of birth: 21 February 1922
- Place of birth: Budapest, Hungary
- Date of death: 23 September 2008 (aged 86)
- Place of death: Budapest, Hungary
- Position: Left midfielder

Youth career
- 1933–1941: MTK Budapest

Senior career*
Years	Team	Apps	(Gls)
1941–1956	Vasas SC	270	(87)

International career
	Hungary	3	(0)

Managerial career
- 1957–1963: Vasas SC
- 1965: Vasas SC
- 1966–1967: Hungary
- 1967–1969: Vasas SC
- 1970–1971: Pierikos
- 1971–1974: Hungary
- 1974–1977: Vasas SC
- 1978–1979: Admira Wacker
- 1984–1986: Vasas SC
- 1995: Vasas SC
- * Club domestic league appearances and goals

Olympic medal record

Representing Hungary

Men's football
Silver medal – second place	1972 Munich	Team competition

Rudolf Illovszky (21 February 1922 – 23 September 2008) was a Hungarian football player and manager. He was both a player and manager of Vasas SC. He also served as the manager of the Hungary national football team from 1971 to 1974.

A football stadium in Budapest, home to Vasas SC, was named after Illovszky on February 12, 1960.

Illovszky died of pneumonia in Budapest in 2008, at the age of 86.

== Honours ==
=== Player ===
Vasas SC

- Hungarian Cup: 1955
- Mitropa Cup: 1956

=== Manager ===
Vasas SC

- Hungarian League: 1961, 1962, 1965, 1977
- Hungarian Cup: 1986
- Mitropa Cup: 1960, 1962, 1965

Hungary

- Olympic medal: 1972
- UEFA Euro 1972: fourth place

=== Personal honours ===
- Béla Bay Prize: 2002

== See also ==
- List of one-club men
