= Volodymyr Troshkin =

Ukrainian footballer and coach (1947–2020)

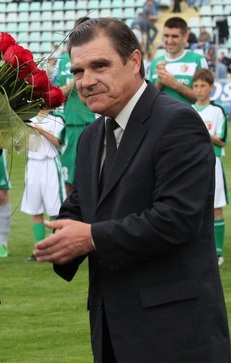
- Troshkin in 2011

Personal information
- Full name: Volodymyr Mykolayovych Troshkin
- Date of birth: 28 September 1947
- Place of birth: Yenakiieve, Ukrainian SSR, USSR
- Date of death: 5 July 2020 (aged 72)
- Position: Defender

Youth career
- Yenakiieve Chemical Plant

Senior career*
Years	Team	Apps	(Gls)
1966–1967	Industriya Yenakiieve	24	(3)
1968–1969	SKA Kyiv	63	(9)
1969–1977	Dynamo Kyiv	205	(21)
1978	Dnipro Dnipropetrovsk	14	(0)
Total		306	(33)

International career
1971–1976	USSR Olympic	14	(1)
1972–1977	USSR	31	(1)

Managerial career
- 1978–1979: SKA Kyiv (assistant)
- 1979: SKA Kyiv
- 1980–1982: Avanhard Rivne (assistant)
- 1983–1984: Avanhard Rivne
- 1985–1991: Ukrainian SSR youth (assistant)
- 1992–1996: Ukraine U-21 (assistant)
Medal record
Men's football
Representing Soviet Union
Summer Olympics
Bronze medal – third place	1976 Montreal	Team competition
UEFA European Championship
Silver medal – second place	1972 Belgium
- * Club domestic league appearances and goals

Volodymyr Mykolayovych Troshkin (Ukrainian: Володимир Миколайович Трошкін, Russian: Владимир Николаевич Трошкин; 28 September 1947 – 5 July 2020) was a Ukrainian footballer and coach. He was considered by many to be the best right back in 1970s in Ukraine (Ukrainian SSR). He was born in Yenakiieve.

Following retirement from playing and coaching career, Troshkin worked as a football functionary in the Ukrainian Association of Football (FFU/UAF) and the Ukrainian Association of Football Veterans. In Ukrainian Association of Football he headed a committee on players' status and transfers.

== Career ==
He started his professional playing career in Industriya Yenakiieve (today FC Pivdenstal Yenakiieve) in mid 1960s that participated in football competitions of the Soviet Class B (third tier).

In 1968–1969 Troshkin served his "obligatory military duty" (see conscription in the Soviet Union) in SKA Kyiv that played in the Soviet Class A Second Group (second tier).

In 1969, he joined FC Dynamo Kyiv that was coached by Viktor Maslov.

== International career ==
He earned 31 caps for the USSR national football team, and participated in UEFA Euro 1972. He also won a bronze medal in football at the 1976 Summer Olympics.

== Honours ==
- Soviet Top League winner: 1971, 1974, 1975, 1977
- Soviet Cup winner: 1974
- UEFA Cup Winners' Cup winner: 1974–75
- UEFA Super Cup winner: 1975
- European Football Championship runner-up: 1972
- Olympic bronze medal: 1976
