= Lajos Kű =

Hungarian footballer

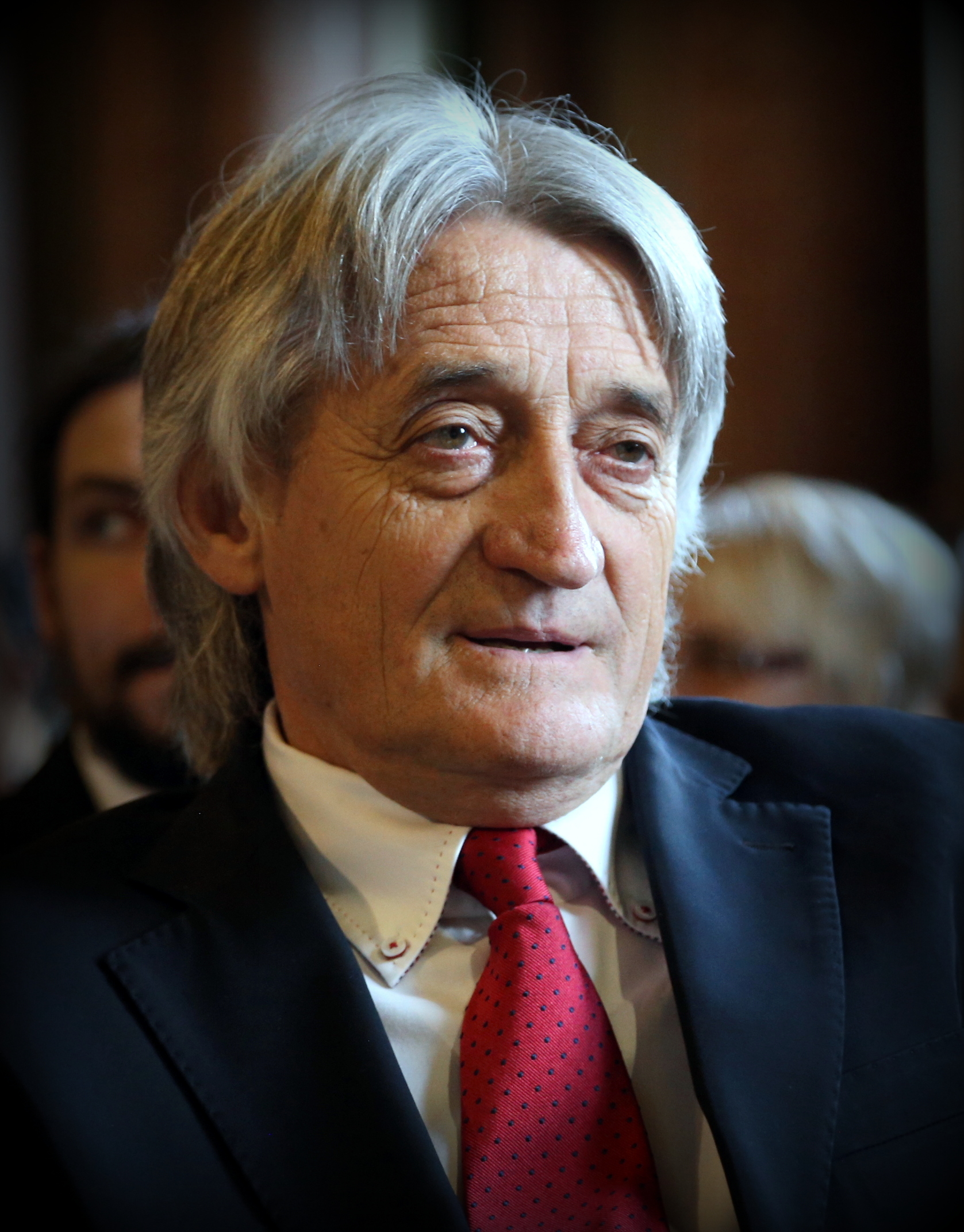

Personal information
- Date of birth: 5 July 1948 (age 78)
- Place of birth: Székesfehérvár, Hungary
- Height: 1.80 m (5 ft 11 in)
- Position: Left wing

Youth career
- Videoton SC

Senior career*
Years	Team	Apps	(Gls)
1967–1969	Videoton SC	16	(0)
1969–1974	Ferencváros	85	(16)
1974–1975	Vasas SC	24	(0)
1975–1977	Volán FC		
1978–1979	Club Brugge		
1979–1980	Buffalo Stallions		
1980–1983	SC Eisenstadt	40	(3)
1983–1984	FC Mönchhof		

International career
1972	Hungary	8	(1)
Medal record
Men's Football
Representing Hungary
Olympic Games
Silver medal – second place	1972 Munich	Team competition
- * Club domestic league appearances and goals

Lajos Kű (born 5 July 1948) is a Hungarian former footballer who played as a midfielder for Videoton, Ferencvárosi TC, Club Brugge and SC Eisenstadt. In his second game for Club Brugge, he played in the 1978 European Cup Final against Liverpool.

He won a silver medal in football at the 1972 Summer Olympics, and also participated in UEFA Euro 1972 for the Hungary national team.

After having spent 15 years abroad, he returned to Hungary in the early 1990s, working as a businessman.

== Honours ==
Ferencváros

- Hungarian Cup: 1971–72, 1973–74

Club Brugge

- European Champion Clubs' Cup: runner-up 1977–78

Hungary

- Olympic Games: 1972 (silver medal)
