= Sándor Zámbó =

Hungarian footballer

Personal information
- Full name: Sándor Zámbó
- Date of birth: 10 October 1944
- Place of birth: Újpest, Hungary
- Position: Centre forward

Youth career
- Újpesti Dózsa

Senior career*
Years	Team	Apps	(Gls)
- Újpesti Dózsa

International career
1969 - 1975	Hungary	33	(3)
- * Club domestic league appearances and goals

Sándor Zámbó (born 10 October 1944 in Újpest, Hungary) is a former Hungarian footballer. He spent all of his professional career at Újpesti Dózsa from 1963 to 1980.

He played 33 matches and scored 3 goals for the Hungary national team, and is most famous for his participation in Hungarian UEFA Euro 1972 team.

Zámbó won 9 Hungarian championship titles with Újpest and played in the Inter-Cities Fairs Cup Final in 1969.

== Sources ==
- Ki kicsoda a magyar sportéletben?, III. kötet (S–Z). Szekszárd, Babits Kiadó, 1995, 322. o., ISBN 963-495-014-0 (in Hungarian)
- Rejtő László–Lukács László–Szepesi György: Felejthetetlen 90 percek (Sportkiadó, 1977) ISBN 963-253-501-4 (in Hungarian)
- nemzetisport.hu: Ládát pakol az újpesti kedvenc (in Hungarian)
