= Johan Einar Boström =

Swedish football referee

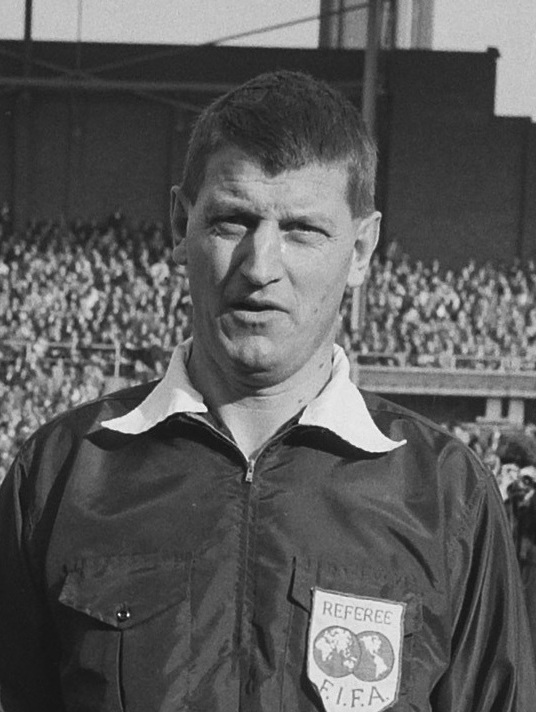
- Boström in 1965
- Born: 9 October 1922; Gävle, Sweden
- Died: 21 September 1977 (aged 54)

Domestic
Years	League	Role
1957–1972	Allsvenskan	Referee

International
Years	League	Role
1960–1972	FIFA listed	Referee

Johan Einar Boström (9 October 1922 – 21 September 1977) was a Swedish football referee.

== Refereeing career ==
In 1957, Boström began officiating in the Allsvenskan, the top flight of Swedish football. In 1960, he was appointed as a FIFA referee.

In 1972, Boström was selected as a referee for UEFA Euro 1972, where he officiated the third place play-off between Belgium and Hungary.

Boström retired from refereeing in 1972.
