= Yuriy Istomin =

Soviet Ukrainian footballer

Personal information
- Full name: Yuriy Vasylyovych Istomin
- Date of birth: 3 July 1944
- Place of birth: Kharkiv, Ukrainian SSR, USSR
- Date of death: 6 February 1999 (aged 54)
- Position: Defender

Youth career
- 1963: Avangard Kharkiv

Senior career*
Years	Team	Apps	(Gls)
1964–1965	SKA Kyiv		
1966–1974	CSKA Moscow	206	(1)
1975	SK Lutsk		

International career
1967–1972	USSR	34	(0)
Medal record
Representing Soviet Union
Men's Football
Bronze medal – third place	1972 Munich	Team competition
UEFA European Championship
Runner-up	1972 Belgium
- * Club domestic league appearances and goals

Yuriy Vasylyovych Istomin (Ukrainian: Юрій Васильович Істомин, Russian: Юрий Васильевич Истомин, Yuriy Vasilyevich Istomin; 3 July 1944 – 6 February 1999) was a Soviet Ukrainian footballer.

== Honours ==
- Soviet Top League winner: 1970.
- UEFA Euro 1972 runner-up: 1972.
- Olympic bronze: 1972.

== International career ==
He earned 34 caps for the USSR national football team, and participated in UEFA Euro 1968 and UEFA Euro 1972. He also earned a bronze medal in football at the 1972 Summer Olympics.
