= László Bálint =

Hungarian footballer (born 1948)

Personal information
- Date of birth: 1 February 1948 (age 78)
- Place of birth: Budapest, Hungary
- Height: 1.80 m (5 ft 11 in)
- Position: Defender

Senior career*
Years	Team	Apps	(Gls)
1967–1979	Ferencváros	316	(37)
1979–1981	Club Brugge	48	(0)
1981–1983	Toulouse	67	(4)
1983–1984	Grenoble	23	(0)
Total		467	(43)

International career
1972–1982	Hungary	76	(4)

Managerial career
- 1986–1987: Volán
- 1988: Hungary
- 1991: Volán
- * Club domestic league appearances and goals

Medal record

Men's football

Representing Hungary

Olympic Games
Silver medal – second place	1972 Munich	Team competition

László Bálint (born 1 February 1948) is a Hungarian former footballer, who played as a defender.

During his club career he played for Ferencvárosi TC, Club Brugge K.V., Toulouse FC and Grenoble Foot 38. He earned 76 caps and scored 3 goals for the Hungary national football team from 1972 to 1982, and participated in UEFA Euro 1972, the 1978 FIFA World Cup, and the 1982 FIFA World Cup. He also won a silver medal in football at the 1972 Summer Olympics.

Later he served as the coach of the national team in 1988.

As a player, he was nicknamed "Báró" (The Baron) because of his elegant appearance. He is a graduate of the Budapest University of Economics.
