= Stade Maurice Dufrasne =

Stadium in Belgium

Coordinates: 50°36′36″N 5°32′36″E

- Sclessin
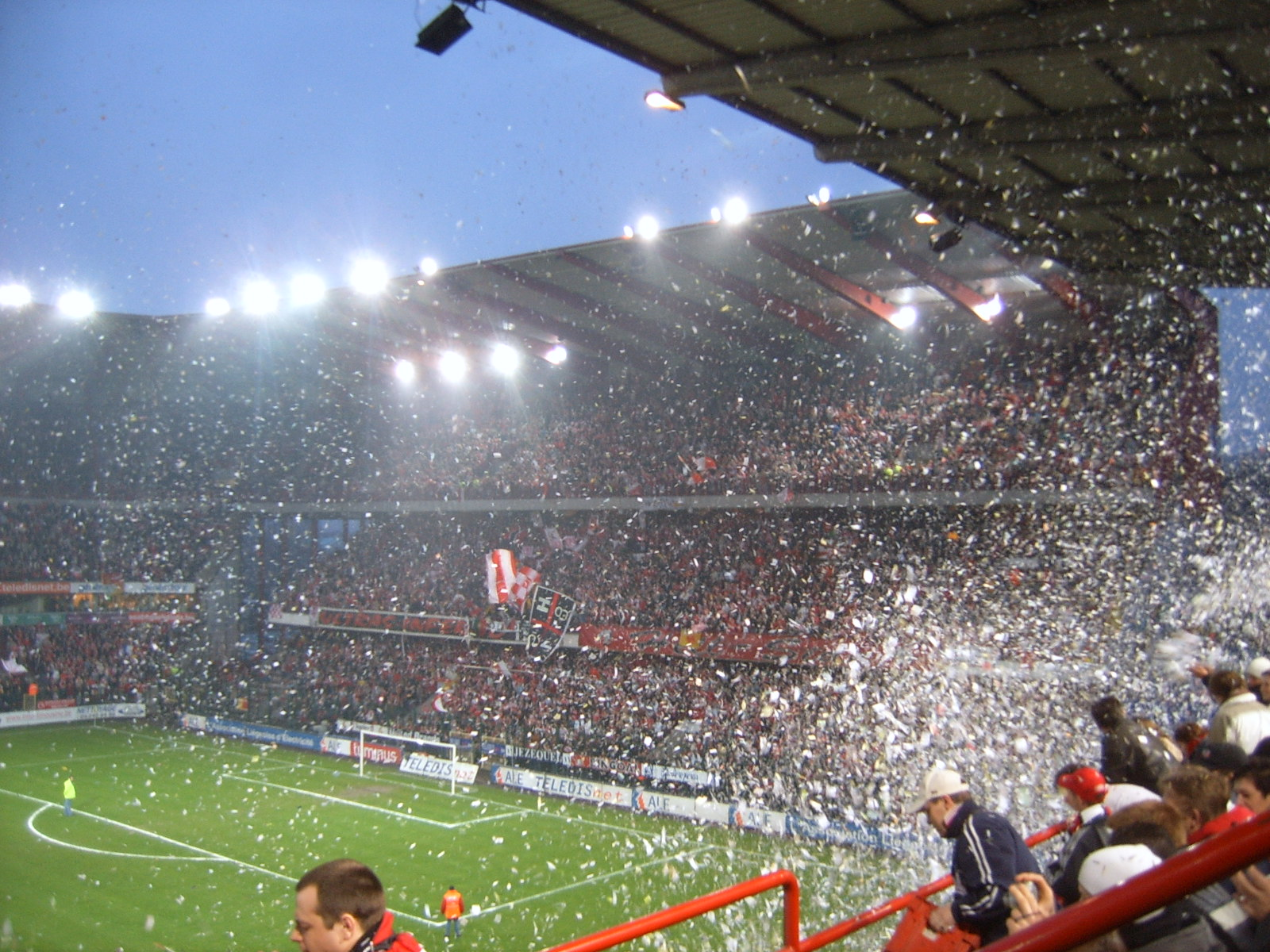
- Stade Maurice Dufrasne before a 2007 home game
- Interactive map of Stade Maurice Dufrasne
- Full name: Stade Maurice Dufrasne
- Location: Liège, Belgium
- Capacity: 27,670 (limited capacity), 30,023 (maximum capacity)

Construction
- Opened: 1909
- Renovated: 1985, 1992, 1995, 1999, 2006, 2012

Tenant
- Standard Liège

The Stade Maurice Dufrasne (French pronunciation: [mɔʁis dyfʁan]) is a football stadium in Liège, Belgium. The stadium holds 27,670 people. It is also known as Stade de Sclessin, from the name of the quarter of Liège where it is located, and is the home stadium of Standard Liège. Belgium have also played here, notably against Estonia in September 2008 in a 2010 World Cup Qualifier and against Gibraltar on 31 August 2017 in a World Cup Qualifier. The stadium hosted one Euro 1972 match and three Euro 2000 matches.

The stadium's namesake, Maurice Dufrasne, was Chairman of Royal Standard de Liège from 1909 (when the stadium was built) until 1931. He was known to take players to his home and cook them a meal if they played well, especially at home fixtures.

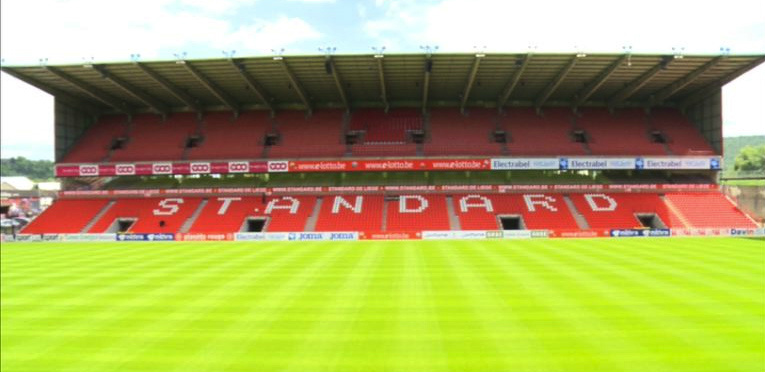

== Euro 1972 match ==
Date		Result		Round
17 June 1972	Hungary	1–1	Belgium	Third-place play-off

== Euro 2000 matches ==
Date		Result		Round
12 June 2000	Germany	1–1	Romania	Group A
18 June 2000	Norway	0–1	FR Yugoslavia	Group C
21 June 2000	Denmark	0–2	Czech Republic	Group D

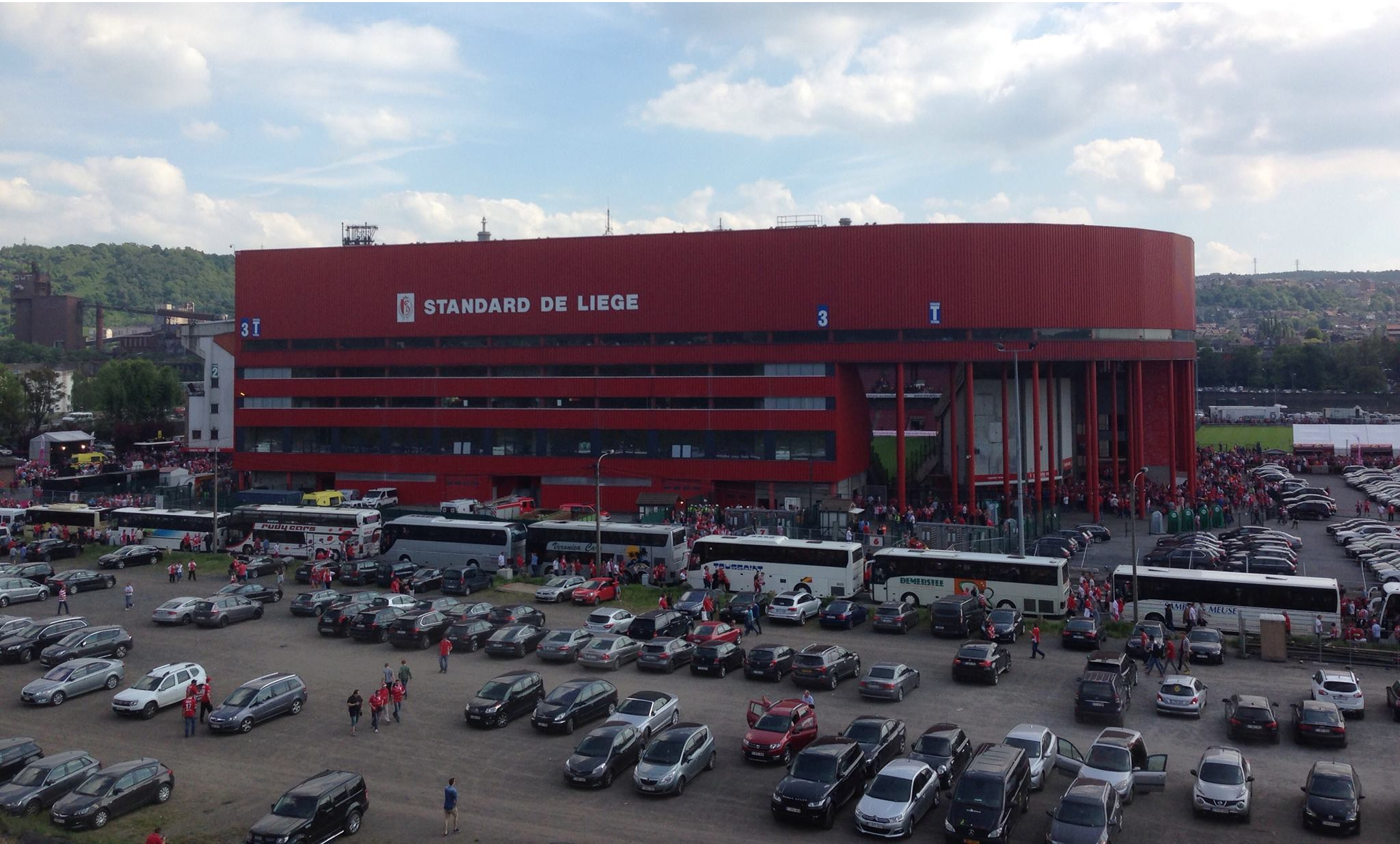
Stade de Sclessin outside view in 2015

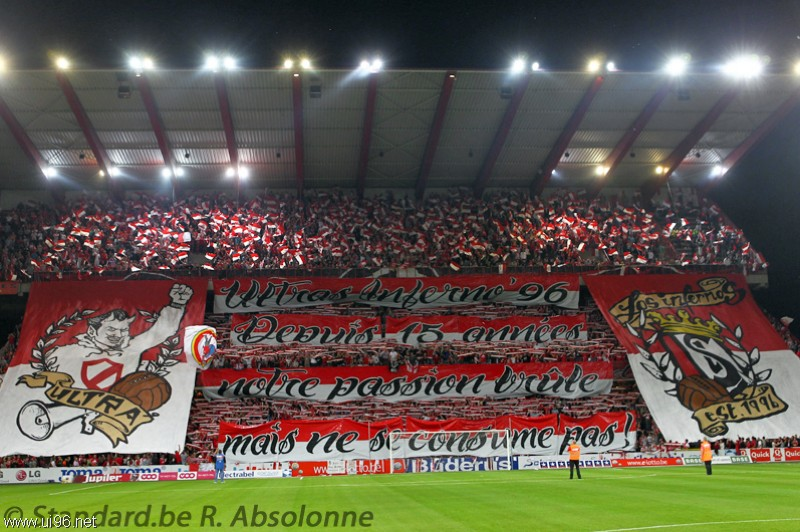
Standard fan group, Ultras Inferno 96, celebrating their 15-year anniversary in July 2012

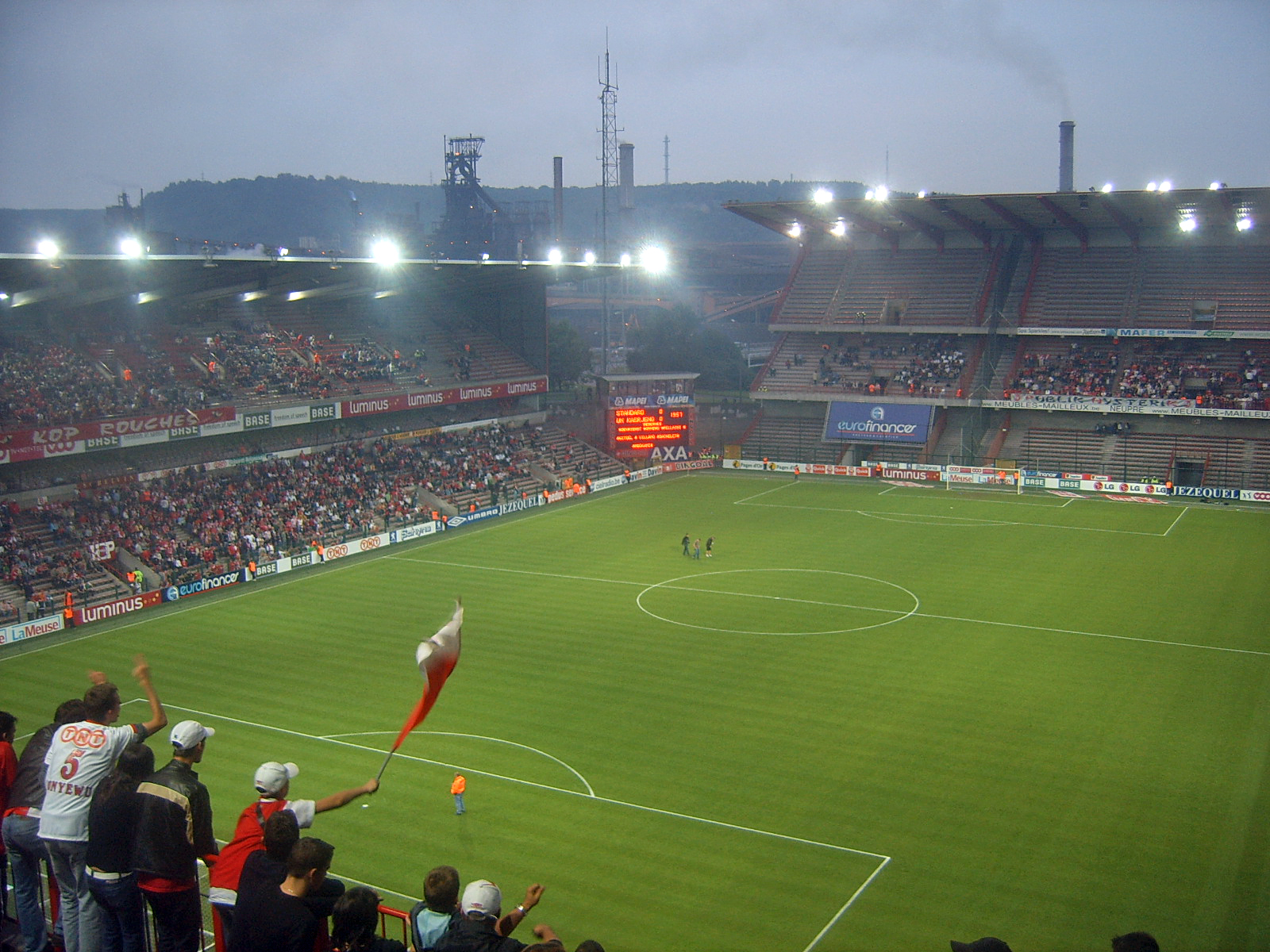
Standard Liège playing against UN Käerjeng 97 in 2007

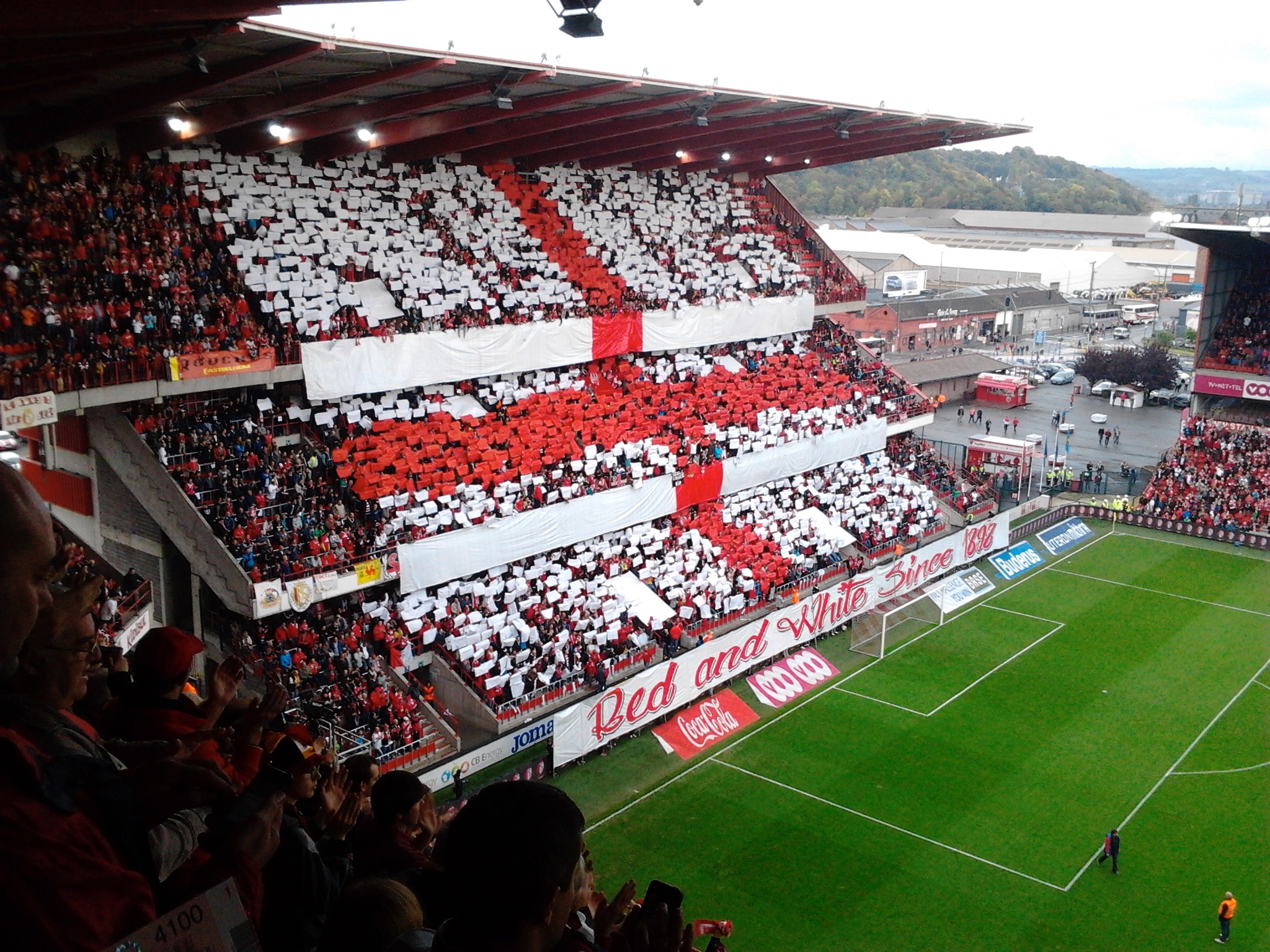
Tifo before a 2013 home game against rivals SC Charleroi
