= Jan Verheyen (footballer) =

Belgian footballer

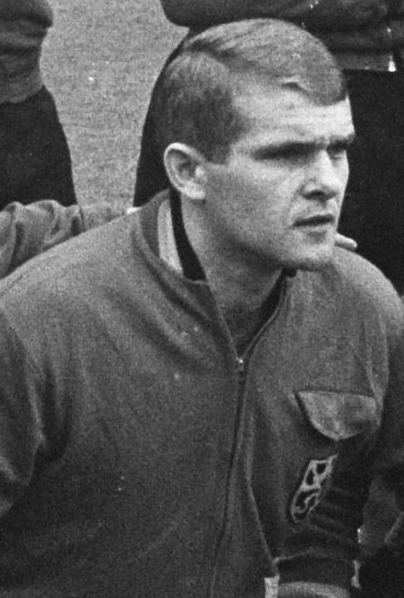
- Verheyen with Belgium in 1966

Personal information
- Date of birth: 9 July 1944 (age 82)
- Place of birth: Hoogstraten, Belgium
- Position: Midfielder

Senior career*
Years	Team	Apps	(Gls)
1961–1971	Beerschot	269	(46)
1971–1975	Anderlecht	111	(6)
1975–1978	Union SG		

International career
1965–1976	Belgium	33	(0)
- * Club domestic league appearances and goals

Jan Verheyen (born 9 July 1944) is a Belgian retired footballer who played as a midfielder for K. Beerschot V.A.C. and Anderlecht. He earned 33 caps for the Belgium national team, and participated in the 1970 FIFA World Cup and UEFA Euro 1972.

== Honours ==
K Beerschot VAC

- Belgian Cup: 1970–71

Anderlecht

- Belgian First Division: 1971–72, 1973–74
- Belgian Cup: 1971–72, 1972–73, 1974–75
- Belgian League Cup: 1973, 1974

Belgium

- UEFA European Championship third place: 1972
