= Odilon Polleunis =

Belgian footballer (1943–2023)

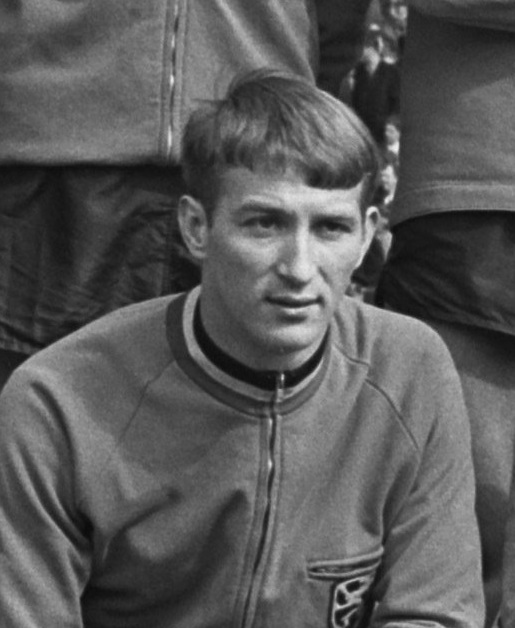
- Polleunis in 1968

Personal information
- Date of birth: 1 May 1943
- Place of birth: Sint-Truiden, German-occupied Belgium
- Date of death: 20 September 2023 (aged 80)
- Place of death: Sint-Truiden
- Position: Striker

Senior career*
Years	Team	Apps	(Gls)
1962–1973	Sint-Truiden	286	(89)
1973–1976	R.W.D. Molenbeek	67	(17)
1976–1977	K.S.K. Tongeren	12	(0)
Total		365	(106)

International career
1968–1975	Belgium	22	(10)

Managerial career
- 1991–1992: Sint-Truiden
- * Club domestic league appearances and goals

Odilon Polleunis (1 May 1943 – 20 September 2023), nicknamed Lon, was a Belgian footballer who won the Belgian Golden Shoe in 1968 while at Sint-Truiden. He played 22 matches and scored 10 goals for the Belgium national team between 1968 and 1975.

== Club career ==
Lon Polleunis played most of his career for Sint-Truiden. The stylish attacker, also originating from Sint-Truiden, became a real club icon. With 89 goals, he is still the club's top scorer in the first division.

In the mid-1970s, "Lon" moved to RWDM, with which he won the Belgian title in 1975.

== International career ==
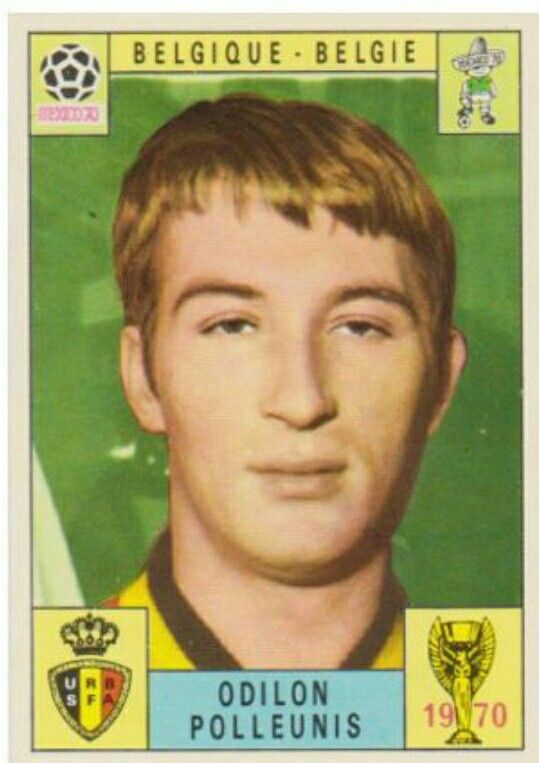
Polleunis for Belgium (México 1970)

Polleunis started in a 2–1 friendly win against the Netherlands on 7 April 1968. He scored on his debut and the first of his seven goals in his first five International games, including a hat-trick against Finland and two against Yugoslavia in World Cup qualifiers in October 1968.

At the 1970 FIFA World Cup Polleunis came on as substitute in Belgium's win against El Salvador and started against Mexico in the third game replacing Raoul Lambert.

== Death ==
Polleunis died of heart failure on 20 September 2023, at the age of 80.

== Honours ==
Sint-Truiden

- Belgian First Division runner-up: 1965–66
- Belgian cup runner-up: 1970-71

RWD Molenbeek

- Belgian First Division: 1974–75
- Jules Pappaert Cup: 1975
- Amsterdam Tournament: 1975

Belgium

- UEFA European Championship third place: 1972

Individual

- Belgian Golden Shoe: 1968
- Man of the Season (Belgian First Division): 1971–72
- Honorary Citizen of Sint-Truiden: 2021
