= Revaz Dzodzuashvili =

Georgian football manager and former player

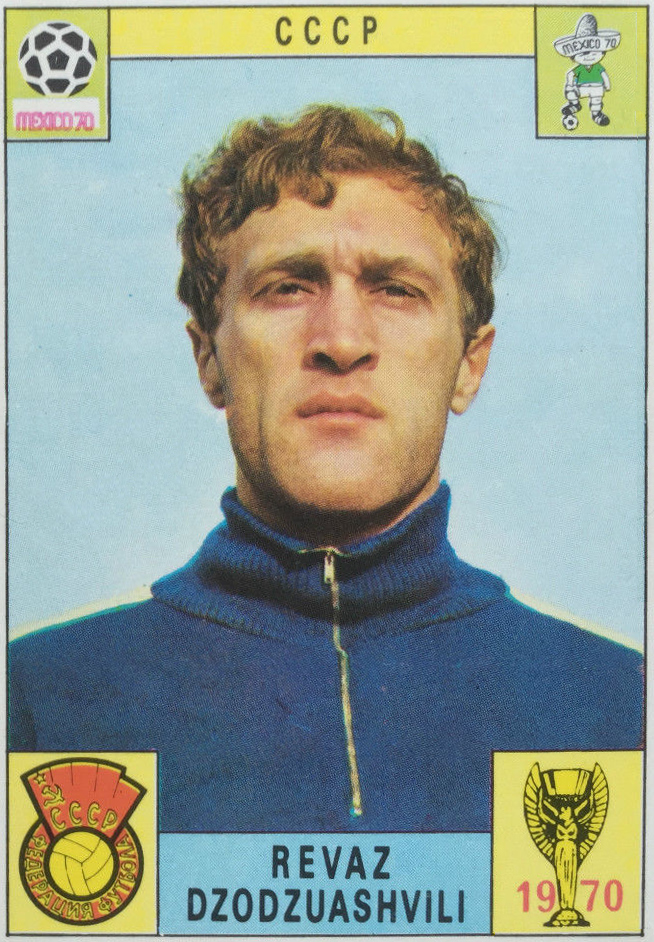

Personal information
- Full name: Revaz Mikheilis dze Dzodzuashvili
- Date of birth: 15 April 1945 (age 81)
- Place of birth: Kutaisi, Georgian SSR, Soviet Union
- Height: 1.73 m (5 ft 8 in)
- Position: Right-back

Youth career
- Torpedo Kutaisi

Senior career*
Years	Team	Apps	(Gls)
1962	Imereti Kutaisi		
1962–1963	Dinamo Tbilisi	0	(0)
1964	Torpedo Kutaisi	0	(0)
1964–1965	Dinamo Sukhumi		
1966–1967	Torpedo Kutaisi	67	(1)
1968–1976	Dinamo Tbilisi	234	(4)
Total		301	(5)

International career
1969–1974	USSR	49	(0)

Managerial career
- 1976: SKA Tbilisi
- 1977: Lokomotiv Samtredia
- 1978: Torpedo Kutaisi
- 1979: Kolkheti Poti
- 1988–1989: Torpedo Kutaisi
- 1990–1991: Iberia Tbilisi (assistant)
- 1991–1993: Dinamo Tbilisi
- 1993–1995: Metalurgi Rustavi
- 1995: Temp Shepetivka
- 1995–1996: Metalurgi Rustavi
- 1996: Metalurgi Rustavi (consultant)
- 1997: Skonto (consultant)
- 1997: Georgia (consultant)
- 1997–1999: Latvia
- 1999: Al-Ittihad Jeddah
- 2000: Locomotive Tbilisi
- 2000–2001: Georgia
- 2001–2002: Torpedo Kutaisi
- 2002: Uralan Elista
- 2002–2003: Spartak-Alania Vladikavkaz
- 2004: Kaunas (advisor)
- 2005: Dynamo Makhachkala
- 2005: Skonto (VP)
- 2005–2006: Torpedo Kutaisi
- 2007: Metalurgi Rustavi
- 2007–2008: Shakhter Karagandy
- 2010: Turan Tovuz
- 2013–2014: Georgia U-21
- 2014: Torpedo Kutaisi
- 2017: Dinamo Sukhumi
- 2017–2018: Meshakhte Tkibuli
- 2022: Algeti Marneuli
- 2023: Shukura Kobuleti
Medal record
Representing the Soviet Union
UEFA European Championship
Runner-up	1972 Belgium
Olympic Games
Bronze medal – third place	1972 Munich	Team competition
- * Club domestic league appearances and goals

Revaz Mikheilis dze Dzodzuashvili (Georgian: რევაზ მიხეილის ძე ძოძუაშვილი; born 15 April 1945) is a Georgian football manager and a former player. He earned 49 caps for the USSR national football team, and participated in the 1970 FIFA World Cup and UEFA Euro 1972. After the UEFA Euro 1972 along with his teammates by Soviet Union national football team – Murtaz Khurtsilava and Evgeni Rudakov – he was named by UEFA in the official Team of the Tournament, where also were presented such great players like Franz Beckenbauer, Gerd Müller, Paul Breitner, Uli Hoeness and Günter Netzer.

After retiring from competitions he became a football manager, including a stint as head coach of the Latvia national football team. He was a manager of Shakhter Karagandy at the start of 2008 season, but his contract was terminated soon.

== Personal life ==
Dzoduashvili's son, Mikheil Dzodzuashvili, is married to Georgian singer Sopho Khalvashi. Together they have two daughters.

== International career ==
Dzodzuashvili was capped 49 times for Soviet Union national football team, made his debut against Colombia in international friendly match, which was held on Estadio Nemesio Camacho El Campín in Bogotá 20 February 1969.

== Career statistics ==
Appearances and goals by national team and year
National team	Year	Apps	Goals
Soviet Union	1969	6	0
Soviet Union	1970	8	0
Soviet Union	1971	8	0
Soviet Union	1972	16	0
Soviet Union	1973	9	0
Soviet Union	1974	2	0
Total		49	0

== Honours ==
=== Player ===
Dinamo Tbilisi

- Soviet Top League third place: 1969, 1971, 1972, 1976
- Soviet Cup runner-up: 1970

Soviet Union

- Football at the 1972 Summer Olympics third place: 1972
- UEFA European Football Championship runner-up: 1972

Individual

- UEFA European Championship Team of the Tournament: 1972
- FUWO European Team of the Season: 1972

=== Manager ===
Dinamo Tbilisi

- Georgian Umaglesi Liga: 1991–92

Torpedo Kutaisi

- Georgian Umaglesi Liga: 2001–02

Olimpi Rustavi

- Georgian Umaglesi Liga: 2006–07
