= Vasas SC =

Sports club in Hungary

Vasas
- Full name: Vasas Futball Club
- Founded: 16 March 1911; 115 years ago
- Ground: Illovszky Rudolf Stadion, Budapest
- Capacity: 5,054
- Chairman: László Markovits
- Manager: Gábor Erős
- League: NB I
- 2025–26: NB II, 1st of 16 (champion)
- Website: vasasfc.hu
Home colours	Away colours

Vasas SC (Hungarian pronunciation: [ˈvɒʃɒʃ]) is a Hungarian sports club based in Budapest.

Members of the Hungarian Union of Iron Workers founded the club as Vas- és Fémmunkások Sport Clubja, the "Sport Club of Iron and Metal Workers", on 16 March 1911. The club colours are red and blue. Most of its facilities are situated in Budapest's 13th district in the north of the city.

They have won the Hungarian League six times. Vasas is known internationally for reaching the semi-finals of the 1957–58 European Cup, the quarter-finals in the 1967–68 European Cup season, and for being the most successful club in the Mitropa Cup with 6 championships.

== History ==
Vasas first entered the Nemzeti Bajnokság I in the 1916–17 season. Since then the club have managed to win seven titles. The club's most successful period was between 1957 and 1966, when they won the Hungarian league five times.

== Crest and colours ==
=== Naming history ===
- 1911–1925: Vas-és Fémmunkások Sport Clubja
- 1926–1943: Vasas SC
- 1943–1944: Nemzeti Nehézipari Munkások Kinizsi SC
- 1944–1949: Vasas SC
- 1949–1957: Budapesti Vasas SC
- 1957–1992: Vasas SC
- 1992–1993 Vasas SC-Smirnoff
- 1993–1995: Vasas Ilzer
- 1995–1996: Vasas Casino Vígadó
- 1997: Vasas SC
- 1997–2001: Vasas Danubius Hotels
- 2001–2003: Vasas SC
- 2003–2009?: Budapesti Vasas SC
- 2009–2011: Vasas SC
- 2011–2012: Vasas–HÍD
- 2012–present: Vasas FC

=== Manufacturers and shirt sponsors ===
The following table shows in detail Vasas SC kit manufacturers and shirt sponsors by year:

Period	Kit manufacturer	Shirt sponsor
1995−97	Lotto	Casino Vigadó
1998−01	Lotto	Danubius Hotels
2001–02	Hummel	–
2004–05	Jako	pannonbau
2005–06	Jako	Herz
2006–08	Lancast	Herz
2008–09	Lancast	Herz / Regale Klíma
2009–10	Lancast	–
2011	Lancast	Híd
2011–12	Lancast	Vasas SC
2012–13	Dragon Sport	–
2014–15	Adidas	HunGast
2015–	Adidas	ALPROSYS

== Stadium ==
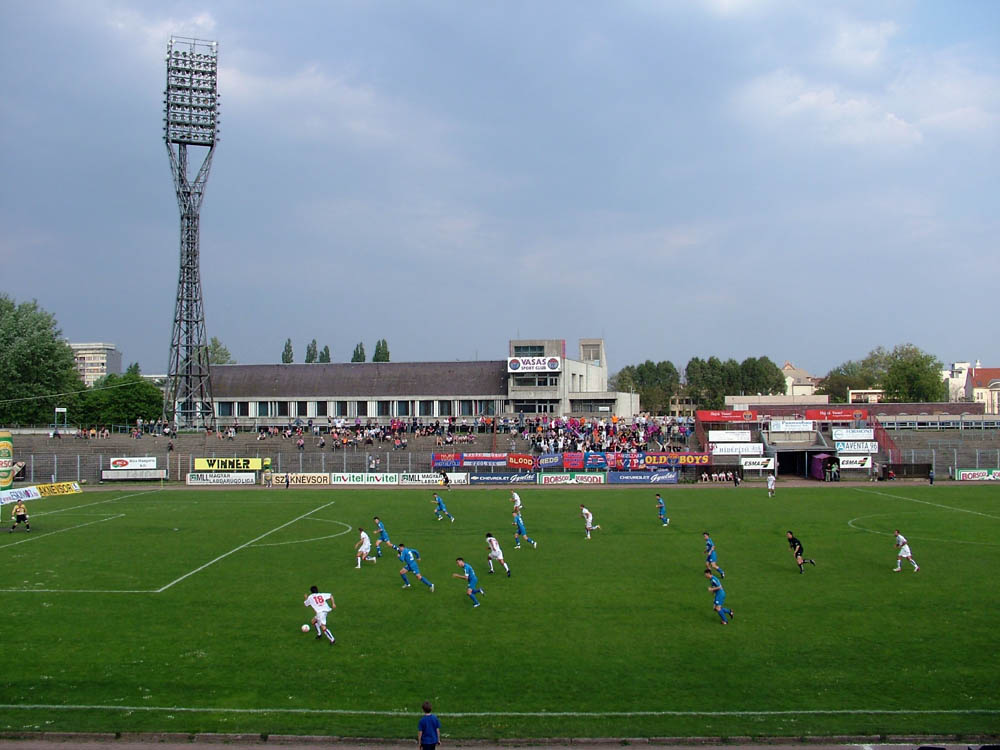
Vasas SC–Zalaegerszegi TE in the 2006–07 Nemzeti Bajnokság I on 28 April 2007

Vasas played their home matches in the Illovszky Rudolf Stadion located in the 13th district of Budapest between 1960 and 2016. The stadium capacity was 9,000. The last match was played between Vasas SS and Videoton FC in the 2016–17 Nemzeti Bajnokság I on 29 October 2016. As part of the Hungarian Football Stadium Reconstruction Program, the stadium was demolished in 2016 and a brand new stadium was built in its place.

On 5 July 2019, the new stadium was opened. The first match was played by Vasas SC and FC DAC 1904 Dunajská Streda which was won by the hosts 2–0. The capacity of the new stadium is 5054 and it cost 7.5 billion HUF.

On 7 August 2019, the first Nemzeti Bajnokság II match was played in the stadium when Vasas hosted Soroksár SC in the 2019–20 Nemzeti Bajnokság II season.

On 11 July 2019 the first international match was played between Budapest Honvéd FC and FK Žalgiris in the 2019–20 UEFA Europa League qualifying phase. The match was won by the hosts 3–1.

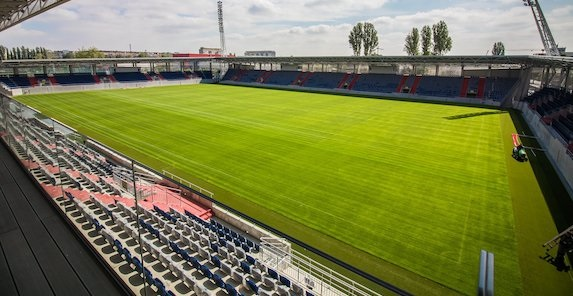
The new stadium

== Honours ==
- Nemzeti Bajnokság I
  - Winners (6): 1957, 1960–61, 1961–62, 1965, 1966, 1976–77
- Nemzeti Bajnokság II
  - Winners (5): 1915, 1941–42, 2014–15, 2021–22, 2025–26
- Magyar Kupa
  - Winners (4): 1954–55, 1972–73, 1980–81, 1985–86
  - Runners-up (4): 1979–80, 1999–2000, 2005–06, 2016–17
- Mitropa Cup
  - Winners (6, record): 1956, 1957, 1962, 1965, 1969–70, 1982–83
- European Cup / UEFA Champions League
  - Semi-finalists (1): 1957–58

== Seasons ==
=== League positions ===
As of 12 July 2025

- Between 2002–03 and 2003–04 the second tier league called NB I/B.

== Current squad ==
As of 22 September 2026

Note: Flags indicate national team as defined under FIFA eligibility rules; some limited exceptions apply. Players may hold more than one non-FIFA nationality.

No.	Pos.	Nation	Player
4	DF	HUN	Bence Pávkovics
6	MF	HUN	Dominik Sztojka
7	FW	HUN	András Radó
8	MF	HUN	Bence Banó-Szabó
9	FW	HUN	Márk Koszta
10	FW	HUN	Márk Kovácsréti
14	FW	HUN	Áron Doktorics
15	MF	HUN	Sándor Hidi
16	MF	HUN	Boldizsár Rab
17	DF	HUN	Dániel Csóka
18	FW	HUN	Gergő Pálinkás
23	DF	UKR	Viktor Hey
24	MF	HUN	Szabolcs Mezei
26	GK	HUN	János Uram

No.	Pos.	Nation	Player
29	FW	HUN	Bence Pethő
31	GK	HUN	Zsombor Molnár
34	DF	HUN	Kenneth Otigba
36	DF	HUN	Botond Baráth
46	FW	HUN	Barnabás Barkóczi
57	DF	HUN	Patrick Iyinbor
68	DF	HUN	Attila Girsik
77	FW	HUN	Milán Tóth
83	FW	HUN	Patrik Kovács
84	FW	HUN	Rajmund Horváth
87	GK	HUN	Márk Engedi
88	MF	HUN	Jozef Urblík
89	FW	HUN	Csaba Molnár
94	MF	HUN	Benjámin Cseke

=== Out on loan ===
Note: Flags indicate national team as defined under FIFA eligibility rules; some limited exceptions apply. Players may hold more than one non-FIFA nationality.

No. / Pos. / Nation / Player; 20 / DF / HUN / Máté Ódor (at FK Csíkszereda until 30 June 2027)	No. / Pos. / Nation / Player; 21 / MF / HUN / Bertalan Kapornai (at Nagykanizsa until 30 June 2027)

=== Youth academy ===
Note: Flags indicate national team as defined under FIFA eligibility rules; some limited exceptions apply. Players may hold more than one non-FIFA nationality.

No.	Pos.	Nation	Player
—	DF	HUN	Dominik Kovács
—	DF	HUN	Zsombor Puskás
—	DF	HUN	Máté Lukácz
—	MF	HUN	Bendegúz Móga
—	MF	HUN	Zalán Vecsey
—	MF	HUN	Zsombor Boros

No.	Pos.	Nation	Player
—	MF	HUN	Attila Girsik
—	FW	HUN	Balázs Pócs
—	FW	HUN	Csaba Molnár
—	FW	HUN	Jeromos Farkas
—	FW	HUN	Dominik Földi
—	FW	HUN	Márk Petres

== Ownership ==
On 4 January 2017 it was announced that János Jámbor bought 99% of the shares of the Vasas FC.

== Non-playing staff ==
=== Management ===
Position	Name
Managing director	(Hungary) Nagy Miklós
Technical director	(Hungary) Kopjári Nándor
Club doctor	(Hungary) Dezső Lejkó
Kit manager	(Hungary) Dániel Kutassy

=== First team staff ===
Position	Name
Head coach	(Hungary) Gábor Erős
Assistant coach	(Hungary) Gábor Nagy
Athletics coach	(Hungary) József Havrán
Goalkeeping coach	(Hungary) Balázs Farkas
Physio	(Hungary) Buda Lajtaváry
Physio	(Hungary) János Nagy

== Twin teams ==
On 18 May 2016 a cooperation was announced between Vasas Kubala Akadémia and Eredivisie club SBV Vitesse. According to the cooperation, the two club have a common showcase, take part in a common conference and education. Gerry Hamstra said that it is very important for the Dutch club to initiate new cooperations in this region.

- (Netherlands) SBV Vitesse

== Trivia ==
János Kádár, HSWP First Secretary and Hungarian leader from 1956 until 1988, was a supporter of Vasas. A working-class man, Kádár had played in the team when young and was its president for a short period in the mid-1950s (when, after being released from prison, Kádár was party secretary in Budapest 13th district, where the team is based). During the 1960s, it was not uncommon to see Kádár in the crowd during Vasas games. Unlike some of his Eastern Europe counterparts, though, Kádár did not use his position to favor his team, nor did he allow Hungarian officials to interfere in football as it was common in other bloc countries.

== See also ==
- List of Vasas SC managers
- List of Vasas SC records and statistics
- List of Vasas SC seasons
