= UEFA Euro 1972 =

European football competition

1972 UEFA European Football Championship
Europees kampioenschap voetbal België 1972 (in Dutch) Championnat d'Europe de football Belgique 1972 (in French) Fußball-Europameisterschaft Belgien 1972 (in German)

Tournament details
- Host country: Belgium
- Dates: 14–18 June
- Teams: 4
- Venues: 4 (in 3 host cities)

Final positions
- Champions: West Germany (1st title)
- Runners-up: Soviet Union
- Third place: Belgium
- Fourth place: Hungary

Tournament statistics
- Matches played: 4
- Goals scored: 10 (2.5 per match)
- Attendance: 121,880 (30,470 per match)
- Top scorer: (West Germany) Gerd Müller (4 goals)
- Best player: (West Germany) Gerd Müller

The 1972 UEFA European Football Championship final tournament was held in Belgium. This was the fourth UEFA European Championship, held every four years and endorsed by UEFA. The final tournament took place between 14 and 18 June 1972.

Only four countries played in the final tournament, with the tournament consisting of the semi-finals, a third place play-off, and the final.

The hosts were only announced after the qualifying round, which meant all teams had to participate in the qualification process for the final stage. Belgium was chosen among three candidates; the other bids came from England and Italy, whose teams did not reach the semi-finals.

West Germany won the tournament, beating the Soviet Union 3–0 in the final, with goals coming from Gerd Müller (twice) and Herbert Wimmer at the Heysel Stadium in Brussels.

== Qualification ==
The qualifying round was played throughout 1970 and 1971 (group phase), and 1972 (quarter-finals). There were eight qualifying groups of four teams each, with matches played on a home-and-away basis. The group winners qualified for the quarter-finals, played in two legs, home and away. The winners of the quarter-finals went through to the final tournament.

=== Qualified teams ===
Team	Qualified as	Qualified on	Previous appearances in tournament (Note: Bold indicates champion for that year.)
Belgium (host)	Quarter-final winner	13 May 1972	0 (debut)
Soviet Union	Quarter-final winner	13 May 1972	3 (**1960**, 1964, 1968)
West Germany	Quarter-final winner	13 May 1972	0 (debut)
Hungary	Quarter-final winner	17 May 1972	1 (1964)

== Venues ==
Brussels		Liège
Heysel Stadium	Stade Émile Versé	Stade Maurice Dufrasne
Capacity: **75,000**	Capacity: **30,000**	Capacity: **35,000**
UEFA Euro 1972 is located in Belgium		Antwerp
UEFA Euro 1972 is located in Belgium		Bosuilstadion
UEFA Euro 1972 is located in Belgium		Capacity: **60,000**

== Match officials ==
Country	Referee
Sweden	Johan Einar Boström
(East Germany) East Germany	Rudi Glöckner
Austria	Ferdinand Marschall
Scotland	William Mullan

== Final tournament ==
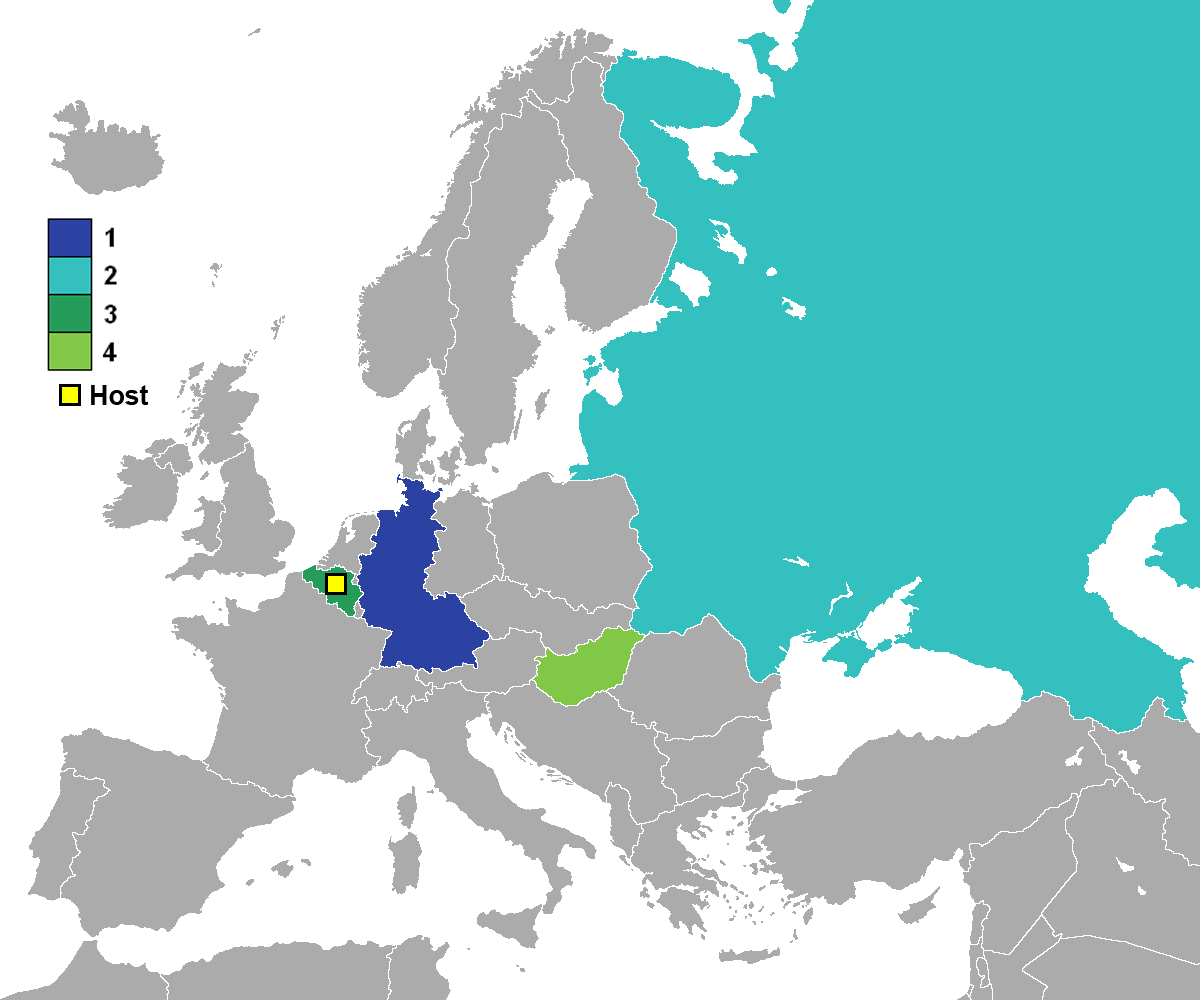
Finalists and their results

At the final tournament, extra time and a penalty shoot-out were used to decide the winner if necessary.

All times are local, CET (UTC+1)

=== Bracket ===
Semi-finals
14 June – Antwerp
Belgium	1
**West Germany**	**2**
14 June – Brussels (Émile Versé)
Hungary	0
**Soviet Union**	**1**

Final
18 June – Brussels (Heysel)
**West Germany**	**3**
Soviet Union	0
Third place play-off
17 June – Liège
Hungary	1
**Belgium**	**2**

=== Semi-finals ===
14 June 1972
20:00

Hungary	0–1	Soviet Union
	Report	Konkov 53'

Stade Émile Versé, Brussels
Attendance: 1,659
Referee: Rudi Glöckner (East Germany)

14 June 1972
20:00

Belgium	1–2	West Germany
Polleunis 83'	Report	Müller 24', 71'

Bosuilstadion, Antwerp
Attendance: 55,669
Referee: William Mullan (Scotland)

=== Third-place play-off ===
17 June 1972
20:00

Hungary	1–2	Belgium
Kű 53' (pen.)	Report	Lambert 24'; Van Himst 28'

Stade Maurice Dufrasne, Liège
Attendance: 6,184
Referee: Johan Einar Boström (Sweden)

=== Final ===
18 June 1972
16:00

West Germany	3–0	Soviet Union
Müller 27', 58'; Wimmer 52'	Report

Heysel Stadium, Brussels
Attendance: 43,437
Referee: Ferdinand Marschall (Austria)

== Statistics ==
=== Goalscorers ===
There were 10 goals scored in 4 matches, for an average of 2.5 goals per match.

4 goals

- (West Germany) Gerd Müller

1 goal

- (Belgium) Raoul Lambert
- (Belgium) Odilon Polleunis
- (Belgium) Paul Van Himst
- (Hungary) Lajos Kű
- (Soviet Union) Anatoliy Konkov
- (West Germany) Herbert Wimmer

=== Awards ===
UEFA Team of the Tournament

Goalkeeper	Defenders	Midfielders	Forwards
(Soviet Union) Yevhen Rudakov	(Soviet Union) Revaz Dzodzuashvili (Soviet Union) Murtaz Khurtsilava (West Germany) Franz Beckenbauer (West Germany) Paul Breitner	(West Germany) Uli Hoeneß (West Germany) Günter Netzer (West Germany) Herbert Wimmer	(Belgium) Raoul Lambert (West Germany) Jupp Heynckes (West Germany) Gerd Müller
