= Hungary at the 1972 Summer Olympics =

- IOC code: HUN
- NOC: Hungarian Olympic Committee

in Munich
- Competitors: 232 (187 men and 45 women) in 20 sports
- Flag bearer: Gergely Kulcsár
- Medals Ranked 8th: Gold 6 Silver 13 Bronze 16 Total 35

Summer Olympics appearances (overview)
- 1896; 1900; 1904; 1908; 1912; 1920; 1924; 1928; 1932; 1936; 1948; 1952; 1956; 1960; 1964; 1968; 1972; 1976; 1980; 1984; 1988; 1992; 1996; 2000; 2004; 2008; 2012; 2016; 2020; 2024

Other related appearances
- 1906 Intercalated Games

Hungary competed at the 1972 Summer Olympics in Munich, West Germany. 232 competitors, 187 men and 45 women, took part in 134 events in 20 sports.

== Medalists ==
=== Gold ===
- András Balczó — Modern Pentathlon, Men's Individual Competition
- György Gedó — Boxing, Men's Light Flyweight
- Csaba Fenyvesi — Fencing, Men's Épée Individual
- Sándor Erdős, Csaba Fenyvesi, Győző Kulcsár, István Osztrics, and Pál Schmitt — Fencing, Men's Épée Team
- Imre Földi — Weightlifting, Men's Bantamweight
- Csaba Hegedűs — Wrestling, Men's Greco-Roman Middleweight

=== Silver ===
- András Balczó, Zsigmond Villányi, and Pál Bakó — Modern Pentathlon, Men's Team Competition
- László Orbán — Boxing, Men's Lightweight
- János Kajdi — Boxing, Men's Welterweight
- József Deme and János Rátkai — Canoeing, Men's K2 1000m Kayak Pairs
- Tamás Wichmann — Canoeing, Men's C1 1000m Canadian Singles
- Jenő Kamuti — Fencing, Men's Foil Individual
- Péter Marót — Fencing, Men's Sabre Individual
- Ildikó Bóbis — Fencing, Women's Foil Individual
- Ildikó Bóbis, Ildikó Rónay, Ildikó Schwarczenberger, Mária Szolnoki, and Ildikó Rejtő — Fencing, Women's Foil Team
- Andrea Gyarmati — Swimming, Women's 100m Backstroke
- Lajos Szűcs — Weightlifting, Men's Flyweight
- István Géczi, Péter Vépi, Miklós Páncsics, Péter Juhász, Lajos Szűcs, Mihály Kozma, Antal Dunai, Lajos Kű, Béla Váradi, Ede Dunai, László Bálint, Lajos Kocsis, Kálmán Tóth, László Branikovics, József Kovács, Csaba Vidács, and Ádám Rothermel — Football (soccer), Men's Team Competition
- András Bodnár, Tibor Cservenyák, István Görgényi, Tamás Faragó, Zoltán Kásás, Ferenc Konrád, István Magas, Dénes Pócsik, László Sárosi, Endre Molnár, and István Szívós, Jr. — Water Polo, Men's Team Competition

=== Bronze ===
- András Botos — Boxing, Men's Featherweight
- Géza Csapó — Canoeing, Men's K1 1000m Kayak Singles
- Anna Pfeffer — Canoeing, Women's K1 500m Kayak Singles
- Gyözõ Kulcsár — Fencing, Men's Épée Individual
- Péter Marót, Péter Bakonyi, Pál Gerevich, Tamás Kovács, and Tibor Pézsa — Fencing, Men's
- Ilona Békési, Mónika Császár, Márta Kelemen, Anikó Kéry, Krisztina Medveczky, and Zsuzsanna Nagy — Gymnastics, Women's Team Combined Exercises
- Lajos Papp — Shooting, Men's Free Rifle, Three Positions
- András Hargitay — Swimming, Men's 400m Individual Medley
- Andrea Gyarmati — Swimming, Women's 100m Butterfly
- Sándor Holczreiter — Weightlifting, Men's Flyweight
- János Benedek — Weightlifting, Men's Featherweight
- György Horváth — Weightlifting, Men's Light Heavyweight
- Ferenc Kiss — Wrestling, Men's Greco-Roman Heavyweight
- László Klinga — Wrestling, Men's Freestyle Bantamweight
- Károly Bajkó — Wrestling, Men's Freestyle Light Heavyweight
- József Csatári — Wrestling, Men's Freestyle Heavyweight

== Archery ==
In the first modern archery competition at the Olympics, Hungary entered one man and one woman. Their highest placing competitor was Hamvas Agnes Hajdene, at 22nd place in the women's competition.

Women's Individual Competition:

- Hamvas Agnes Hajdene — 2265 points (→ 22nd place)

Men's Individual Competition:

- Bela Nagy — 2302 points (→ 34th place)

== Athletics ==
Men's 800 metres

- András Zsinka

- Heat — 1:49.0 (→ did not advance)

Men's High Jump

- Ádám Szepesi

- Qualifying Round — 2.15 m
- Final — 2.18 m (→ 5th place)

- István Major

- Qualifying Round — 2.15 m
- Final — 2.15 m (→ 6th place)

- Jozsef Tihanyi

- Qualification Round — 2.09 m (→ did not advance)

Men's Discus Throw

- Géza Fejér

- Qualifying Round — 61.58 m
- Final — 62.62 m (→ 5th place)

- Ferenc Tégla

- Qualifying Round — 60.60 m
- Final — 60.60 m (→ 7th place)

- János Murányi

- Qualifying Round — 60.34 m
- Final — 57.92 m (→ 12th place)

Women's High Jump

- Erika Rudolf

- Qualifying Round — 1.76m
- Final — 1.79m (→ 16th place)

== Boxing ==
Men's Flyweight (– 51 kg)

- Sandor Orbán

- First Round — Lost to Orn-Chim Chawalit (THA), walkover

Men's Welterweight (– 67 kg)

- János Kajdi → Silver Medal

- First Round — Bye
- Second Round — Defeated James Vrij (HOL), 4:1
- Third Round — Defeated Damdinjavyn Bandi (MGL), KO-2
- Quarterfinals — Defeated Maurice Hope (GBR), 5:0
- Semifinals — Defeated Richard Murunga (KEN), 4:1
- Final — Lost to Emilio Correa (CUB), 0:5

Men's Heavyweight (+ 81 kg)

- Jozsef Reder

- First Round — Lost to Ion Alexe (ROM), 0:5

== Cycling ==
Four cyclists represented Hungary in 1972.

Individual road race

- András Takács — 23rd place
- Tibor Debreceni — 64th place
- Imre Géra — 67th place
- József Peterman — did not finish (→ no ranking)

Team time trial

- Tibor Debreceni
- Imre Géra
- József Peterman
- András Takács

== Fencing ==
19 fencers, 14 men and 5 women, represented Hungary in 1972. Hungary finished top of the fencing medal table with eight in total: two gold, four silver, and two bronze.

Men's foil

- Jenő Kamuti
- Sándor Szabó
- László Kamuti

Men's team foil

- Sándor Szabó, Csaba Fenyvesi, László Kamuti, István Marton, Jenő Kamuti

Men's épée

- Csaba Fenyvesi
- Győző Kulcsár
- Pál Schmitt

Men's team épée

- Csaba Fenyvesi, Győző Kulcsár, Pál Schmitt, Sándor Erdős, István Osztrics

Men's sabre

- Péter Marót
- Tamás Kovács
- Tibor Pézsa

Men's team sabre

- Tibor Pézsa, Péter Marót, Péter Bakonyi, Tamás Kovács, Pál Gerevich

Women's foil

- Ildikó Farkasinszky-Bóbis
- Mária Szolnoki
- Ildikó Ságiné Ujlakyné Rejtő

Women's team foil

- Ildikó Ságiné Ujlakyné Rejtő, Ildikó Farkasinszky-Bóbis, Ildikó Schwarczenberger-Tordasi, Mária Szolnoki, Ildikó Rónay-Matuscsák

== Football ==
Men's Team Competition

- First Round (Group C)

- Defeated Iran (5-0)
- Drew with Brazil (2-2)
- Defeated Denmark (2-0)

- Second Round (Group 1)

- Defeated East Germany (2-0)
- Defeated West Germany (4-1)
- Defeated Mexico (2-0)

- Final

- Lost to Poland (2-1) → Silver Medal

- Team Roster

- László Bálint
- László Branikovits
- Antal Dunai
- Ede Dunai
- István Géczi
- Péter Juhász
- Lajos Kocsis
- József Kovács
- Mihály Kozma
- Lajos Kű
- Miklós Páncsics
- Ádám Rothermel
- Lajos Szűcs
- Kálmán Tóth
- Béla Várady
- Péter Vépi
- Csaba Vidáts

== Handball ==
Hungary's first two games resulted in victories over the United States and Japan, guaranteeing the team a berth in the second round regardless of the result of the third game. However, that loss to Yugoslavia carried over into the second round, putting the Hungarians at a disadvantage. Losses to Romania and West Germany put Hungary into last place in the division. The team played against Sweden for seventh and eighth places, losing 19–18.

Men's Team Competition:

- Hungary - 8th place (2-4-0)
- Roster - János Adorján, Béla Bartalos, János Csík, László Harka, József Horváth, Gyula Hurth, Sandor Kaló, István Marosi, Lajos Simó, János Stiller, István Szabó, László Szabó, Sándor Takács, István Varga, Károly Vass, and Sandor Vass

== Modern pentathlon ==
Three male pentathletes represented Hungary in 1972. András Balczó won an individual gold while the team won silver.

Men's Individual Competition:

- András Balczó - 5412 points (→ Gold Medal)
- Zsigmond Villányi - 5047 points (12th place)
- Pál Bakó - 4879 points (15th place)

Men's Team Competition:

- Balczó, Villányi, and Bakó - 15348 points (→ Silver Medal)

Alternate Member: Peter Kelemen

== Shooting ==
Nine shooters represented Hungary in 1972. Lajos Papp won bronze in the 300 m rifle, three positions event.

25 m pistol

- Szilárd Kun

50 m pistol

- Kornél Marosvári
- Pál Katkó

300 m rifle, three positions

- Lajos Papp
- Béla Nagy

50 m rifle, three positions

- László Hammerl
- Sándor Nagy

50 m rifle, prone

- László Hammerl
- Sándor Nagy

50 m running target

- Gyula Szabó
- István Jenei

== Swimming ==
Men's 100m Frbeestyle

- István Szentirmay

- Heat — 54.71s (→ did not advance)

- Attila Csészéri

- Heat — 55.37s (→ did not advance)

Men's 200m Freestyle

- Attila Csészéri

- Heat — DNS (→ did not advance)

== Water polo ==
Men's Team Competition

- Preliminary Round (Group B)

- Defeated The Netherlands (3-0)
- Drew with West Germany (3-3)
- Defeated Greece (6-1)
- Defeated Australia (10-2)

- Final Round (Group I)

- Defeated Italy (8-7)
- Defeated United States (5-3)
- Defeated Yugoslavia (4-2)
- Drew with Soviet Union (3-3) → Silver Medal

- Team Roster

- András Bodnár
- Tibor Cservenyák
- István Görgényi
- Tamás Faragó
- Zoltán Kásás
- Ferenc Konrád
- István Magas
- Dénes Pócsik
- László Sárosi
- Endre Molnár
- István Szívós, Jr.
