= Football at the 1972 Summer Olympics =

Tournament details
- Host country: West Germany
- Dates: 27 August – 10 September 1972
- Teams: 16 (from 5 confederations)
- Venues: 6 (in 6 host cities)

Final positions
- Champions: Poland (1st title)
- Runners-up: Hungary
- Third place: East Germany; Soviet Union

Tournament statistics
- Matches played: 38
- Goals scored: 135 (3.55 per match)
- Attendance: 795,433 (20,932 per match)
- Top scorer: (Poland) Kazimierz Deyna (9 goals)

The 1972 Olympic football tournament, held in Munich, Augsburg, Ingolstadt, Nuremberg, Passau, and Regensburg, was played as part of the 1972 Summer Olympics. The tournament features 16 men's national teams from five continental confederations. The 16 teams are drawn into four groups of four and each group plays a round-robin tournament. At the end of the group stage, the top two teams advanced to the second group stage, where the second-placed teams in each group advanced to the bronze medal match while the first-placed teams advanced to the gold medal match held at Olympiastadion on 10 September 1972. The medalists were Poland (gold), Hungary (silver), and shared bronze medalists East Germany and the Soviet Union, the first of three consecutive Olympic football tournaments where all the medalists were communist countries and the first since 1956.

In 2017, the physician of the Soviet team claimed that the bronze medal match between the Soviet Union and East Germany was fixed at the request of Soviet coach Aleksandr Ponomarev.

== Venues ==
Munich	Football at the 1972 Summer Olympics is located in Bavaria	Nuremberg
Olympiastadion	Football at the 1972 Summer Olympics is located in Bavaria	Frankenstadion
Regensburg	Football at the 1972 Summer Olympics is located in Bavaria	Passau
Jahnstadion	Football at the 1972 Summer Olympics is located in Bavaria	Dreiflüssestadion
Ingolstadt	Football at the 1972 Summer Olympics is located in Bavaria	Augsburg
ESV-Stadion	Football at the 1972 Summer Olympics is located in Bavaria	Rosenaustadion

== First round ==
=== Group A ===
Team	Pld	W	D	L	GF	GA	GD	Pts	Qualification
West Germany	3	3	0	0	13	0	+13	6	Advanced to second round
Morocco	3	1	1	1	6	3	+3	3	Advanced to second round
Malaysia	3	1	0	2	3	9	−6	2	
United States	3	0	1	2	0	10	−10	1	

Source: FIFA
27 August 1972
15:00

West Germany	3–0	Malaysia
Worm 56'; Kalb 71'; Seliger 82'	Report

Olympiastadion, Munich
Attendance: 60,000
Referee: Armando Marques (Brazil)
27 August 1972
15:00

Morocco	0–0	United States
	Report

Rosenaustadion, Augsburg
Attendance: 4,000
Referee: Rudi Glöckner (East Germany)

29 August 1972
16:30

West Germany	3–0	Morocco
Nickel 30' (pen.), 33' (pen.); Hitzfeld 53'	Report

Dreiflüssestadion, Passau
Attendance: 16,000
Referee: Doğan Babacan (Turkey)
29 August 1972
16:30

Malaysia	3–0	United States
Shaharuddin 14'; Salleh 67'; Wan Zawawi 77'	Report

ESV-Stadion, Ingolstadt
Attendance: 3,000
Referee: Henry Oberg (Norway)

31 August 1972
16:30

Morocco	6–0	Malaysia
Benkhrif 16'; Faras 19', 21', 25'; El Filali 56'; Tati 85'	Report

ESV-Stadion, Ingolstadt
Attendance: 2,500
Referee: Károly Palotai (Hungary)
31 August 1972
21:00

West Germany	7–0	United States
Nickel 17', 43', 70', 86'; Hitzfeld 47'; Seliger 62'; Bitz 79'	Report

Olympiastadion, Munich
Attendance: 65,000
Referee: Marco Antonio Dorantes García (Mexico)

=== Group B ===
Team	Pld	W	D	L	GF	GA	GD	Pts	Qualification
Soviet Union	3	3	0	0	7	2	+5	6	Advanced to second round
Mexico	3	2	0	1	3	4	−1	4	Advanced to second round
Burma	3	1	0	2	2	2	0	2	
Sudan	3	0	0	3	1	5	−4	0	

Source: FIFA
28 August 1972
16:30

Soviet Union	1–0	Burma
Kolotov 51'	Report

Jahnstadion, Regensburg
Attendance: 6,000
Referee: Jafar Namdar (Iran)
28 August 1972
16:30

Mexico	1–0	Sudan
Manzo 16'	Report

Frankenstadion, Nuremberg
Attendance: 500
Referee: Francesco Francescon (Italy)

30 August 1972
16:30

Mexico	1–0	Burma
Cuéllar 86'	Report

Frankenstadion, Nuremberg
Attendance: 1,000
Referee: Robert Quarshie (Ghana)
30 August 1972
17:30

Soviet Union	2–1	Sudan
Yevriuzhikin 42' (pen.); Zanazanyan 44'	Report	Jaksa 59'

Olympiastadion, Munich
Attendance: 25,000
Referee: Ferdinand Biwersi (West Germany)

1 September 1972
16:30

Soviet Union	4–1	Mexico
Blokhin 7', 13', 14'; Semyonov 58'	Report	Razo 60'

Jahnstadion, Regensburg
Attendance: 8,000
Referee: Luis Pestarino (Argentina)
1 September 1972
16:30

Burma	2–0	Sudan
Soe Than 7'; Aung Moe Thin 61'	Report

Dreiflüssestadion, Passau
Attendance: 2,000
Referee: Marian Środecki (Poland)

=== Group C ===
Team	Pld	W	D	L	GF	GA	GD	Pts	Qualification
Hungary	3	2	1	0	9	2	+7	5	Advanced to second round
Denmark	3	2	0	1	7	4	+3	4	Advanced to second round
Iran	3	1	0	2	1	9	−8	2	
Brazil	3	0	1	2	4	6	−2	1	

Source: FIFA
27 August 1972
15:00

Hungary	5–0	Iran
A. Dunai 31', 48', 90+1'; Várady 52'; Kozma 81'	Report

Frankenstadion, Nuremberg
Attendance: 2,000
Referee: Guillermo Velásquez (Colombia)
27 August 1972
15:00

Denmark	3–2	Brazil
Simonsen 28', 83'; Røntved 50'	Report	Dirceu 68'; Zé Carlos 69'

Dreiflüssestadion, Passau
Attendance: 10,000
Referee: Pavel Kazakov (Soviet Union)

29 August 1972
16:30

Denmark	4–0	Iran
Heino Hansen 16', 58'; Simonsen 39'; Nygaard 44'	Report

Rosenaustadion, Augsburg
Attendance: 3,500
Referee: Abdelkrim Ziani (Morocco)
29 August 1972
17:30

Hungary	2–2	Brazil
A. Dunai 4'; Juhász 84'	Report	Pedrinho 67'; Dirceu 73'

Olympiastadion, Munich
Attendance: 50,000
Referee: William Mullan (Great Britain)

31 August 1972
16:30

Denmark	0–2	Hungary
	Report	E. Dunai 17', 84'

Rosenaustadion, Augsburg
Attendance: 8,500
Referee: Oei Poh Hwa (Malaysia)
31 August 1972
16:30

Iran	1–0	Brazil
Halvai 63'	Report

Jahnstadion, Regensburg
Attendance: 2,200
Referee: Gerhard Schulenburg (West Germany)

=== Group D ===
Team	Pld	W	D	L	GF	GA	GD	Pts	Qualification
Poland	3	3	0	0	11	2	+9	6	Advanced to second round
East Germany	3	2	0	1	11	3	+8	4	Advanced to second round
Colombia	3	1	0	2	5	12	−7	2	
Ghana	3	0	0	3	1	11	−10	0	

Source: FIFA
28 August 1972
16:45

Poland	5–1	Colombia
Deyna 16', 32'; Gadocha 42', 49', 72'	Report	Morón 63'

ESV-Stadion, Ingolstadt
Attendance: 4,000
Referee: Ahmed Gindil Salih (Sudan)
28 August 1972
17:30

East Germany	4–0	Ghana
Kreische 19', 89'; Streich 45'; Sparwasser 66'	Report

Olympiastadion, Munich
Attendance: 40,000
Referee: Michael Wuertz (United States)

30 August 1972
16:30

East Germany	6–1	Colombia
Streich 1', 10'; Sparwasser 9'; Ducke 31'; Vogel 85'; Kreische 88' (pen.)	Report	Espinosa 38'

Dreiflüssestadion, Passau
Attendance: 4,500
Referee: Abdelkader Aouissi (Algeria)
30 August 1972
16:30

Poland	4–0	Ghana
Lubański 40'; Gadocha 59', 89'; Deyna 86'	Report

Jahnstadion, Regensburg
Attendance: 2,200
Referee: Lee Kan-Chee (Hong Kong)

1 September 1972
16:30

Poland	2–1	East Germany
Gorgoń 6', 63'	Report	Streich 45'

Frankenstadion, Nuremberg
Attendance: 10.000
Referee: Werner Winsemann (Canada)
1 September 1972
21:00

Colombia	3–1	Ghana
Morón 56'; Torres 60'; Montaño 82'	Report	Sunday 79'

Olympiastadion, Munich
Attendance: 25,000
Referee: Kurt Tschenscher (West Germany)

== Second round ==
=== Group 1 ===
Team	Pld	W	D	L	GF	GA	GD	Pts	Qualification
Hungary	3	3	0	0	8	1	+7	6	Gold Medal match
East Germany	3	2	0	1	10	4	+6	4	Bronze Medal match
West Germany	3	0	1	2	4	8	−4	1	
Mexico	3	0	1	2	1	10	−9	1	

Source: FIFA
3 September 1972
15:00

West Germany	1–1	Mexico
Hitzfeld 5'	Report	Cuéllar 69'

Frankenstadion, Nuremberg
Attendance: 40,000
Referee: Oei Poh Hwa (Malaysia)
3 September 1972
15:00

Hungary	2–0	East Germany
A. Dunai 60'; Tóth 66'	Report

Dreiflüssestadion, Passau
Attendance: 8,500
Referee: Armando Marques (Brazil)

5 September 1972
15:00

East Germany	7–0	Mexico
Ganzera 34'; Sparwasser 39', 51', 89'; Streich 48'; Kreische 72'; Häfner 79'	Report

ESV-Stadion, Ingolstadt
Attendance: 5,500
Referee: Jafar Namdar (Iran)
6 September 1972
20:00

Hungary	4–1	West Germany
E. Dunai 14'; A. Dunai 43'; Kü 75', 87'	Report	Hitzfeld 33'

Olympiastadion, Munich
Attendance: 70,000
Referee: Luis Pestarino (Argentina)

8 September 1972
16:30

Hungary	2–0	Mexico
A. Dunai 35'; Kocsis 53'	Report

Jahnstadion, Regensburg
Attendance: 2,500
Referee: Lee Kan-Chee (Hong Kong)
8 September 1972
21:30

East Germany	3–2	West Germany
Pommerenke 10'; Streich 53'; Vogel 82'	Report	Hoeneß 31'; Hitzfeld 68'

Olympiastadion, Munich
Attendance: 80,000
Referee: William Mullan (Great Britain)

=== Group 2 ===
Team	Pld	W	D	L	GF	GA	GD	Pts	Qualification
Poland	3	2	1	0	8	2	+6	5	Gold Medal match
Soviet Union	3	2	0	1	8	2	+6	4	Bronze Medal match
Denmark	3	1	1	1	4	6	−2	3	
Morocco	3	0	0	3	1	11	−10	0	

Source: FIFA
3 September 1972
15:00

Denmark	1–1	Poland
Heino Hansen 27'	Report	Deyna 36'

Jahnstadion, Regensburg
Attendance: 4,000
Referee: Abdelkader Aouissi (Algeria)
3 September 1972
21:30

Soviet Union	3–0	Morocco
Semyonov 1'; Kolotov 15'; Elissev 69'	Report

Olympiastadion, Munich
Attendance: 55,000
Referee: Guillermo Velásquez (Colombia)

5 September 1972
16:30

Soviet Union	1–2	Poland
Blokhin 28'	Report	Deyna 79' (pen.); Szołtysik 87'

Rosenaustadion, Augsburg
Attendance: 5,000
Referee: Henry Oberg (Norway)
5 September 1972
16:30

Denmark	3–1	Morocco
Bak 55', 83'; Printzlau 90'	Report	Merzaq 89'

Dreiflüssestadion, Passau
Attendance: 3,100
Referee: Werner Winsemann (Canada)

8 September 1972
16:30

Poland	5–0	Morocco
Kmiecik 3'; Lubański 10'; Deyna 45' (pen.), 63'; Gadocha 53'	Report

Frankenstadion, Nuremberg
Attendance: 500
Referee: Francesco Francescon (Italy)
8 September 1972
16:30

Soviet Union	4–0	Denmark
Kolotov 20'; Semyonov 28'; Blokhin 55'; Sabo 88'	Report

Rosenaustadion, Augsburg
Attendance: 4,000
Referee: Doğan Babacan (Turkey)

== Knockout stage ==
=== Bronze Medal match ===
10 September 1972
10:00

Soviet Union	2–2	East Germany
Blokhin 10'; Khurtsilava 30'	Report	Kreische 33' (pen.); Vogel 78'

Olympiastadion, Munich
Attendance: 80,000
Referee: Armando Marques (Brazil)

Bronze medals shared.

=== Gold Medal match ===
10 September 1972
20:15

Poland	2–1	Hungary
Deyna 47', 68'	Report	Várady 42'

Olympiastadion, Munich
Attendance: 80,000
Referee: Kurt Tschenscher (West Germany)

Team details

Poland

GK	1	Hubert Kostka
RB	19	Zbigniew Gut
CB	5	Lesław Ćmikiewicz
CB	3	Jerzy Gorgoń
LB	4	Zygmunt Anczok
MF	6	Zygmunt Maszczyk
MF	8	Zygfryd Szołtysik
MF	13	Jerzy Kraska
AM	9	Kazimierz Deyna	(substituted off) 76'
FW	11	Robert Gadocha
FW	10	Włodzimierz Lubański
Substitutes:
MF	7	Ryszard Szymczak	(substituted on) 76'
Manager:
(Poland) Kazimierz Górski

Hungary

GK	1	István Géczi
DF	4	Péter Juhász
DF	3	Miklós Páncsics
DF	16	László Bálint
DF	2	Péter Vépi	(yellow card) 87'
MF	7	Mihály Kozma
MF	14	Ede Dunai
MF	10	Lajos Kü		(substituted off) 74'
MF	11	Béla Várady
FW	5	Lajos Szűcs
FW	9	Antal Dunai		(substituted off) 79'
Substitutes:
FW	8	Kálmán Tóth		(substituted on) 79'
MF	17	Lajos Kocsis		(substituted on) 74'
Manager:
(Hungary) Rudolf Illovszky

== Goalscorers ==
With nine goals, Kazimierz Deyna of Poland is the top scorer in the tournament. In total, 135 goals were scored by 66 different players, with none of them credited as own goal.

9 goals

- (Poland) Kazimierz Deyna

7 goals

- (Hungary) Antal Dunai

6 goals

- (East Germany) Joachim Streich
- (Poland) Robert Gadocha
- (Soviet Union) Oleh Blokhin
- (West Germany) Bernd Nickel

5 goals

- (East Germany) Hans-Jürgen Kreische
- (East Germany) Jürgen Sparwasser
- (West Germany) Ottmar Hitzfeld

3 goals

- (Denmark) Allan Simonsen
- (Denmark) Heino Hansen
- (East Germany) Eberhard Vogel
- (Hungary) Ede Dunai
- (Morocco) Ahmed Faras
- (Soviet Union) Viktor Kolotov
- (Soviet Union) Vyacheslav Semyonov

2 goals

- (Brazil) Dirceu
- (Colombia) Jaime Morón
- (Denmark) Keld Bak
- (Hungary) Béla Várady
- (Hungary) Lajos Kű
- (Mexico) Leonardo Cuéllar
- (Poland) Jerzy Gorgoń
- (Poland) Włodzimierz Lubański
- (West Germany) Rudolf Seliger

1 goal

- (Brazil) Pedrinho
- (Brazil) Zé Carlos
- (Myanmar) Than Soe
- (Myanmar) Tin Aung Moe
- (Colombia) Fabio Espinosa
- (Colombia) Luis Montaño
- (Colombia) Ángel Torres
- (Denmark) Kristen Nygaard
- (Denmark) Leif Printzlau
- (Denmark) Per Røntved
- (East Germany) Peter Ducke
- (East Germany) Frank Ganzera
- (East Germany) Reinhard Häfner
- (East Germany) Jürgen Pommerenke
- (Ghana) Ibrahim Sunday
- (Hungary) Péter Juhász
- (Hungary) Lajos Kocsis
- (Hungary) Mihály Kozma
- (Hungary) Kálmán Tóth
- (Iran) Majid Halvai
- (Malaysia) Salleh
- (Malaysia) Shaharuddin
- (Malaysia) Wan Zawawi
- (Morocco) Boujemaa Benkhrif
- (Morocco) Mohamed Merzaq
- (Morocco) Mohammed El Filali
- (Morocco) Mohammed Tati
- (Mexico) Daniel Razo
- (Mexico) Manuel Manzo
- (Poland) Kazimierz Kmiecik
- (Poland) Zygfryd Szołtysik
- (Soviet Union) Murtaz Khurtsilava
- (Soviet Union) Yozhef Sabo
- (Soviet Union) Yuriy Yeliseyev
- (Soviet Union) Gennady Yevriuzhikin
- (Soviet Union) Hovhannes Zanazanyan
- (Sudan) Jaksa
- (West Germany) Hermann Bitz
- (West Germany) Uli Hoeneß
- (West Germany) Jürgen Kalb
- (West Germany) Ronnie Worm

== Final ranking ==
Pos	Team	Pld	W	D	L	GF	GA	GD	Pts
1	Poland	7	6	1	0	21	5	+16	13
2	Hungary	7	5	1	1	18	5	+13	11
3	Soviet Union	7	5	1	1	17	6	+11	11
3	East Germany	7	4	1	2	23	9	+14	9
5	West Germany	6	3	1	2	17	8	+9	7
6	Denmark	6	3	1	2	11	10	+1	7
7	Mexico	6	2	1	3	4	14	−10	5
8	Morocco	6	1	1	4	7	14	−7	3
9	Burma	3	1	0	2	2	2	0	2
10	Malaysia	3	1	0	2	3	9	−6	2
11	Colombia	3	1	0	2	5	12	−7	2
12	Iran	3	1	0	2	1	9	−8	2
13	Brazil	3	0	1	2	4	6	−2	1
14	United States	3	0	1	2	0	10	−10	1
15	Sudan	3	0	0	3	1	5	−4	0
16	Ghana	3	0	0	3	1	11	−10	0

Source: rsssf.com

== Medalists ==
Gold	Silver	Bronze	Bronze
Poland	Hungary	Soviet Union	East Germany
Hubert Kostka; Zbigniew Gut; Jerzy Gorgoń; Zygmunt Anczok; Lesław Ćmikiewicz; Zygmunt Maszczyk; Jerzy Kraska; Kazimierz Deyna; Zygfryd Szołtysik; Włodzimierz Lubański; Robert Gadocha; Ryszard Szymczak; Antoni Szymanowski; Joachim Marx; Grzegorz Lato; Marian Ostafiński; Kazimierz Kmiecik; Marian Szeja; Coach: Kazimierz Górski	István Géczi; Péter Vépi; Miklós Páncsics; Péter Juhász; Lajos Szűcs; Mihály Kozma; Antal Dunai; Lajos Kű; Béla Váradi; Ede Dunai; László Bálint; Lajos Kocsis; Kálmán Tóth; László Branikovits; József Kovács; Csaba Vidács; Adám Rothermel	Oleh Blokhin; Murtaz Khurtsilava; Yuriy Istomin; Volodymyr Kaplychnyi; Viktor Kolotov; Yevgeni Lovchev; Sergei Olshansky; Yevhen Rudakov; Vyacheslav Semyonov; Gennadi Evryuzhikhin; Oganes Zanazanyan; Andrei Yakubik; Arkady Andreasyan; Revaz Dzodzuashvili; Yozhef Sabo; Yuriy Yeliseyev; Volodymyr Onyshchenko; Anatoliy Kuksov; Vladimir Pilgui; Coach: Aleksandr Ponomarev	Jürgen Croy; Manfred Zapf; Konrad Weise; Bernd Bransch; Jürgen Pommerenke; Jürgen Sparwasser; Hans-Jürgen Kreische; Joachim Streich; Wolfgang Seguin; Peter Ducke; Frank Ganzera; Lothar Kurbjuweit; Eberhard Vogel; Harald Irmscher; Ralf Schulenberg; Reinhard Häfner; Siegmar Wätzlich; Coach: Georg Buschner
