= List of Olympic venues in football =

For the Summer Olympics, there are 120 venues that have been or will be used for football. This is the most of any sport at the Olympics.

Cities in bold are Olympic host cities.

Games	Venue	Location	Other sports hosted at venues for those games	Capacity	Ref.
1900	Vélodrome de Vincennes	**Paris**	Cricket, Cycling, Gymnastics, and Rugby union	Not listed.	
1904	Francis Field	**St. Louis**	Archery, Athletics, Cycling, Gymnastics, Lacrosse, Roque, Tennis, Tug of war, Weightlifting, and Wrestling	19,000	
1908	White City Stadium	**London**	Archery, Athletics, Cycling (track), Diving, Field hockey, Gymnastics, Lacrosse, Rugby union, Swimming, Tug of war, Water polo (final), Wrestling	97,000	
1912	Råsunda Stadium	**Stockholm**	Shooting	Not listed.	
1912	Stockholm Olympic Stadium (final)	**Stockholm**	Athletics, Equestrian, Gymnastics, Modern pentathlon (running), Tug of war, Wrestling	33,000	
1912	Traneberg	**Stockholm**	None	Not listed.	
1920	Jules Ottenstadion (Italy-Egypt)	Ghent	None	Not listed.	
1920	Olympisch Stadion (final)	**Antwerp**	Athletics, Equestrian, Field hockey, Gymnastics, Modern pentathlon, Rugby union, Tug of war, Weightlifting	12,771	
1920	Stadion Broodstraat	**Antwerp**	None	Not listed.	
1920	Stade Joseph Marien	Brussels	None	Not listed.	
1924	Stade Bergeyre	**Paris**	None	10,455	
1924	Stade de Colombes (final)	**Paris**	Athletics, Cycling (road), Equestrian, Fencing, Gymnastics, Modern pentathlon (fencing, running), Rugby union, Tennis	22,737	
1924	Stade de Paris	**Paris**	None	5,145	
1924	Stade Pershing	**Paris**	None	8,110	
1928	Monnikenhuize	Arnhem	None	Not listed.	
1928	Olympic Stadium (final)	**Amsterdam**	Athletics, Cycling (track), Equestrian (jumping), Gymnastics	31,600	
1928	Sparta Stadion Het Kasteel	Rotterdam	None	11,026	
1936	Hertha-BSC Field	**Berlin**	None	35,239	
1936	Mommsenstadion	**Berlin**	None	15,005	
1936	Olympic Stadium (final)	**Berlin**	Athletics, Equestrian (jumping), Handball (final)	100,000	
1936	Poststadion	**Berlin**	None	45,000	
1948	Arsenal Stadium	**London**	None	73,000	
1948	Champion Hill	**London**	None	3,000	
1948	Craven Cottage	**London**	None	25,700	
1948	Cricklefield Stadium	**London**	None	3,500	
1948	Empire Stadium (medal matches)	**London**	Athletics, Equestrian (jumping), Field hockey (medal matches)	82,000	
1948	Green Pond Road Stadium	**London**	None	21,708	
1948	Griffin Park	**London**	None	12,763	
1948	Selhurst Park	**London**	None	26,309	
1948	White Hart Lane	**London**	None	36,310	
1952	Helsinki Football Grounds	**Helsinki**	None	10,770.	
1952	Olympic Stadium (final)	**Helsinki**	Athletics, Equestrian (jumping)	70,000	
1952	Arto Tolsa Areena	Kotka	None	3,500	
1952	Lahden kisapuisto	Lahti	None	82,000	
1952	Tampere Stadium	Tampere	None	17,000	
1952	Veritas Stadion	Turku	None	9,372	
1956	Melbourne Cricket Ground (final)	**Melbourne**	Athletics, Field hockey (final)	104,000	
1956	Olympic Park Stadium	**Melbourne**	None	40,000	
1960	Florence Communal Stadium	Florence	None	47,920	
1960	Grosseto Communal Stadium	Grosseto	None	10,200	
1960	L'Aquila Communal Stadium	L'Aquila	None	9,285	
1960	Livorno Ardenza Stadium	Livorno	None	19,238	
1960	Naples Saint Paul's Stadium	Naples	None	60,240	
1960	Pescara Adriatic Stadium	Pescara	None	24,400	
1960	Stadio Flaminio (final)	**Rome**	None	32,000	
1964	Komazawa Stadium	**Tokyo**	None	20,800	
1964	National Stadium (final)	**Tokyo**	Athletics, Equestrian (team jumping)	71,600	
1964	Prince Chichiba Memorial Football Field	**Tokyo**	None	17,600	
1964	Mitsuzawa Football Field	Yokohama	None	10,100	
1964	Nagai Stadium	Osaka	None	20,000	
1964	Nishikyogoku Athletic Stadium	Kyoto	None	10,000	
1964	Ōmiya Football Field	Saitama	None	14,400	
1968	Estadio Azteca (final)	**Mexico City**	None	104,000	
1968	Estadio Cuauhtémoc	Puebla	None	42,648	
1968	Estadio Nou Camp	León	None	33,943	
1968	Jalisco Stadium	Guadalajara	None	56,713	
1972	Drei Flüsse Stadion	Passau	None	20,000	
1972	ESV-Stadion	Ingolstadt	None	11,418	
1972	Jahnstadion	Regensburg	None	11,200	
1972	Olympiastadion (final)	**Munich**	Athletics, Ceremonies (opening/ closing), Equestrian (jumping team), Modern pentathlon (running)	77,000	
1972	Rosenaustadion	Augsburg	None	28,000	
1972	Urban Stadium	Nuremberg	None	45,548	
1976	Lansdowne Park	Ottawa	None	30,000	
1976	Olympic Stadium (final)	**Montreal**	Athletics, Ceremonies (opening/ closing), Equestrian (jumping team final)	70,000	
1976	Sherbrooke Stadium	Sherbrooke	None	10,000	
1976	Varsity Stadium	Toronto	None	21,739	
1980	Dynama Stadium	Minsk	None	41,040	
1980	Dynamo Central Stadium, Grand Arena	**Moscow**	None	36,540	
1980	Grand Arena (final)	**Moscow**	Athletics, Equestrian (jumping individual), Opening/closing ceremonies	78,360	
1980	Kirov Stadium	Saint Petersburg	None	72,000	
1980	Republican Stadium	Kyiv	None	80,000	
1984	Harvard Stadium	Boston	None	30,323	
1984	Navy–Marine Corps Memorial Stadium	Annapolis	None	34,000	
1984	Rose Bowl (final)	Pasadena	None	103,300	
1984	Stanford Stadium	Stanford	None	85,500	
1988	Busan Stadium	Busan	None	30,000	
1988	Daegu Stadium	Daegu	None	23,278	
1988	Daejeon Stadium	Daejeon	None	30,000	
1988	Gwangju Stadium	Gwangju	None	24,000	
1988	Dongdaemun Stadium	**Seoul**	None	26,383	
1988	Olympic Stadium (final)	**Seoul**	Athletics, Equestrian (jumping individual final)	69,950	
1992	Estadi de la Nova Creu Alta	Sabadell	None	16,000	
1992	Estadi del FC Barcelona (final)	**Barcelona**	None	100,000	
1992	RCD Espanyol Stadium	**Barcelona**	None	42,000	
1992	Estadio Luís Casanova	Valencia	None	50,000	
1992	La Romareda	Zaragoza	None	43,000	
1996	Florida Citrus Bowl	Orlando	None	65,000	
1996	Legion Field	Birmingham	None	81,700	
1996	Orange Bowl	Miami	None	72,700	
1996	Robert F. Kennedy Memorial Stadium	Washington, D.C.	None	56,500	
1996	Sanford Stadium (both finals)	Athens	None	86,100	
2000	Brisbane Cricket Ground	Brisbane	None	37,000	
2000	Bruce Stadium	Canberra	None	40,000	
2000	Hindmarsh Stadium	Adelaide	None	20,000	
2000	Melbourne Cricket Ground	Melbourne	None	98,000	
2000	Olympic Stadium (men's final)	**Sydney**	Ceremonies (opening/closing), Athletics	110,000	
2000	Sydney Football Stadium (women's final)	**Sydney**	None	42,000	
2004	Kaftanzoglio Stadium	Thessaloniki	None	37,000	
2004	Karaiskakis Stadium (women's final)	Piraeus	None	40,000	
2004	Olympic Stadium (men's final)	**Athens**	Ceremonies (opening/ closing), Athletics	71,030	
2004	Pampeloponnisiako Stadium	Patras	None	20,000	
2004	Pankritio Stadium	Heraklion	None	98,000	
2004	Panthessaliko Stadium	Volos	None	98,000	
2008	Beijing National Stadium (men's final)	**Beijing**	Ceremonies (opening/closing), Athletics	91,000	
2008	Workers' Stadium (women's final)	**Beijing**	None	70,161	
2008	Qinhuangdao Olympic Sports Center Stadium	Qinhuangdao	None	33,572	
2008	Shanghai Stadium	Shanghai	None	56,842	
2008	Shenyang Olympic Sports Center Stadium	Shenyang	None	60,000	
2008	Tianjin Olympic Center Stadium	Tianjin	None	60,000	
2012	Ricoh Arena (Note: Renamed City of Coventry Stadium due to corporate sponsorship prohibition on venue names.)	Coventry	None	32,500	
2012	Hampden Park	Glasgow	None	52,000	
2012	Old Trafford	Manchester	None	76,212	
2012	Millennium Stadium	Cardiff	None	74,600	
2012	St James' Park	Newcastle upon Tyne	None	52,000	
2012	Wembley Stadium (both finals)	**London**	None	90,000	
2016	Brasília National Stadium	Brasília	None	69,432	
2016	Fonte Nova	Salvador	None	51,708	
2016	Maracanã (both finals)	**Rio de Janeiro**	Ceremonies (opening/closing)	74,738	
2016	Estádio Olímpico João Havelange	**Rio de Janeiro**	Athletics	60,000	
2016	Mineirão	Belo Horizonte	None	58,259	
2016	Arena Corinthians	São Paulo	None	47,605	
2016	Arena da Amazônia	Manaus	None	40,549	
2020	Nissan Stadium (Note: Renamed International Stadium Yokohama due to corporate sponsorship prohibition on venue names.) (both finals)	Yokohama	None	72,000	
2020	Kashima Soccer Stadium	Kashima	None	40,000	
2020	Miyagi Stadium	Rifu	None	49,000	
2020	Ajinomoto Stadium (Note: Renamed Tokyo Stadium due to corporate sponsorship prohibition on venue names.)	Chōfu	Modern pentathlon (swimming, riding, combined run & shoot), Rugby sevens	48,000	
2020	Saitama Stadium	Saitama	None	64,000	
2020	Sapporo Dome	Sapporo	None	41,000	
2024	Parc des Princes (both finals)	**Paris**	None	47,929	
2024	Stade Vélodrome	Marseille	None	67,394	
2024	Parc Olympique Lyonnais	Lyon	None	59,186	
2024	Nouveau Stade de Bordeaux	Bordeaux	None	42,115	
2024	Stade Geoffroy-Guichard	Saint-Étienne	None	41,965	
2024	Allianz Riviera (Note: Renamed Stade de Nice due to corporate sponsorship prohibition on venue names.)	Nice	None	36,178	
2024	Stade de la Beaujoire	Nantes	None	35,322	
2028	Rose Bowl (both finals)	Pasadena	None	89,702	
2028	San Diego Stadium	San Diego	None	35,000	
2028	Nashville Stadium	Nashville	None	30,109	
2028	New York Stadium	New York City	None	25,000	
2028	St. Louis Stadium	St. Louis	None	22,423	
2028	Columbus Stadium	Columbus	None	20,371	
2028	San José Stadium	San Jose	None	18,000	
2032	Lang Park (both finals)	**Brisbane**	Rugby sevens	52,500	
2032	Sydney Football Stadium	Sydney	None	42,500	
2032	Melbourne Rectangular Stadium	Melbourne	None	30,050	
2032	Robina Stadium	Gold Coast	None	27,400	
2032	North Queensland Stadium	Townsville	None	25,000	
2032	Barlow Park	Cairns	None	20,000	
2032	Sunshine Coast Stadium	Kawana Waters	None	20,000	

== Gallery of venues ==
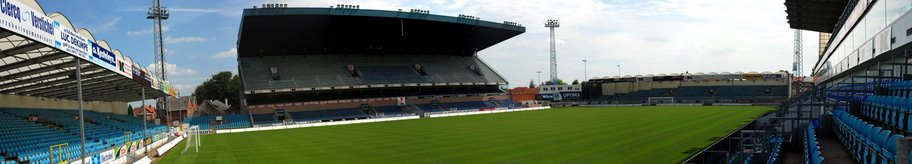
Jules Ottenstadion hosted one football match at the 1920 Summer Olympics in Antwerp.

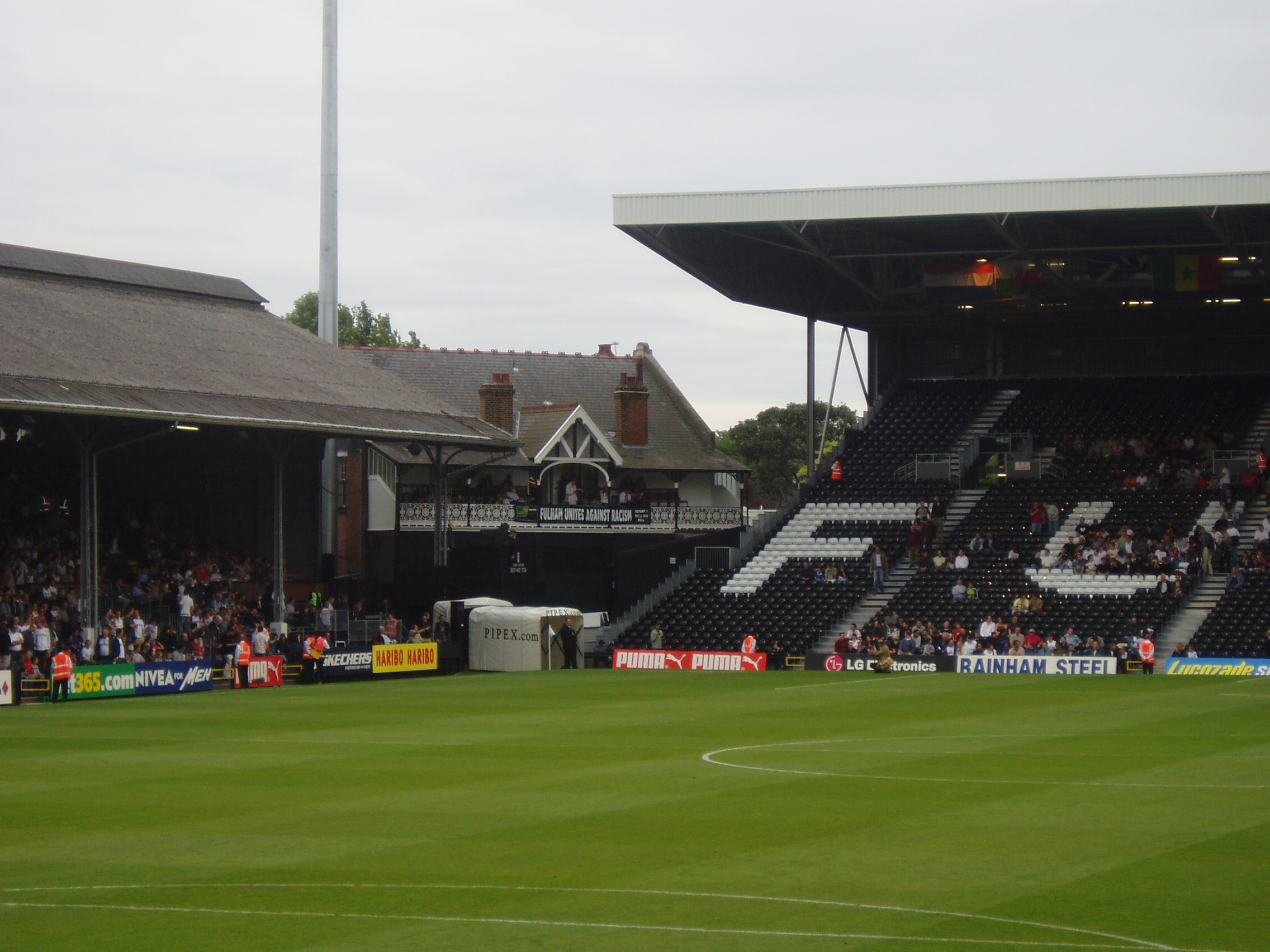
Craven Cottage hosted several football matches at the 1948 Summer Olympics in neighboring London.

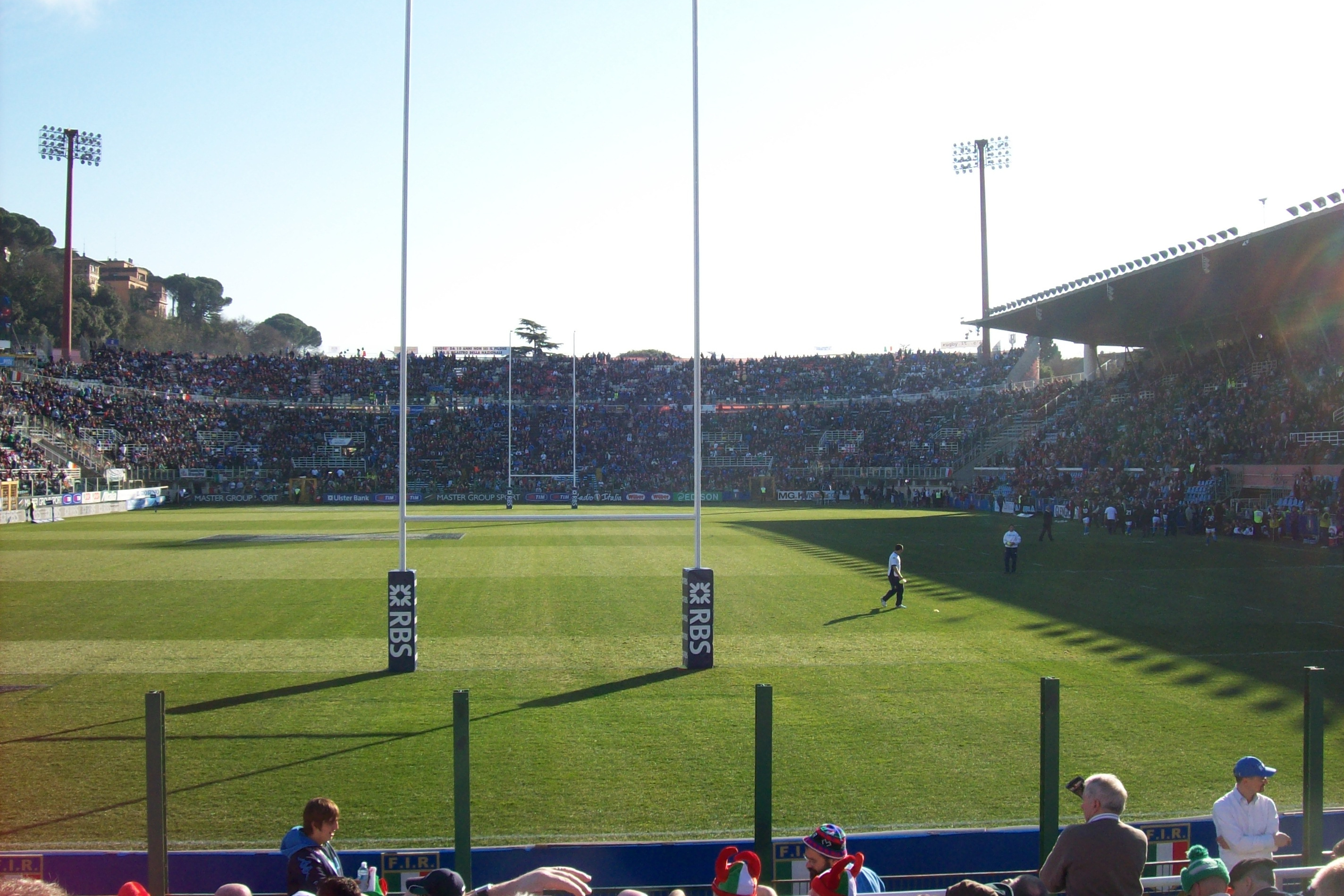
Stadio Flaminio hosted the football final at the 1960 Summer Olympics in Rome.

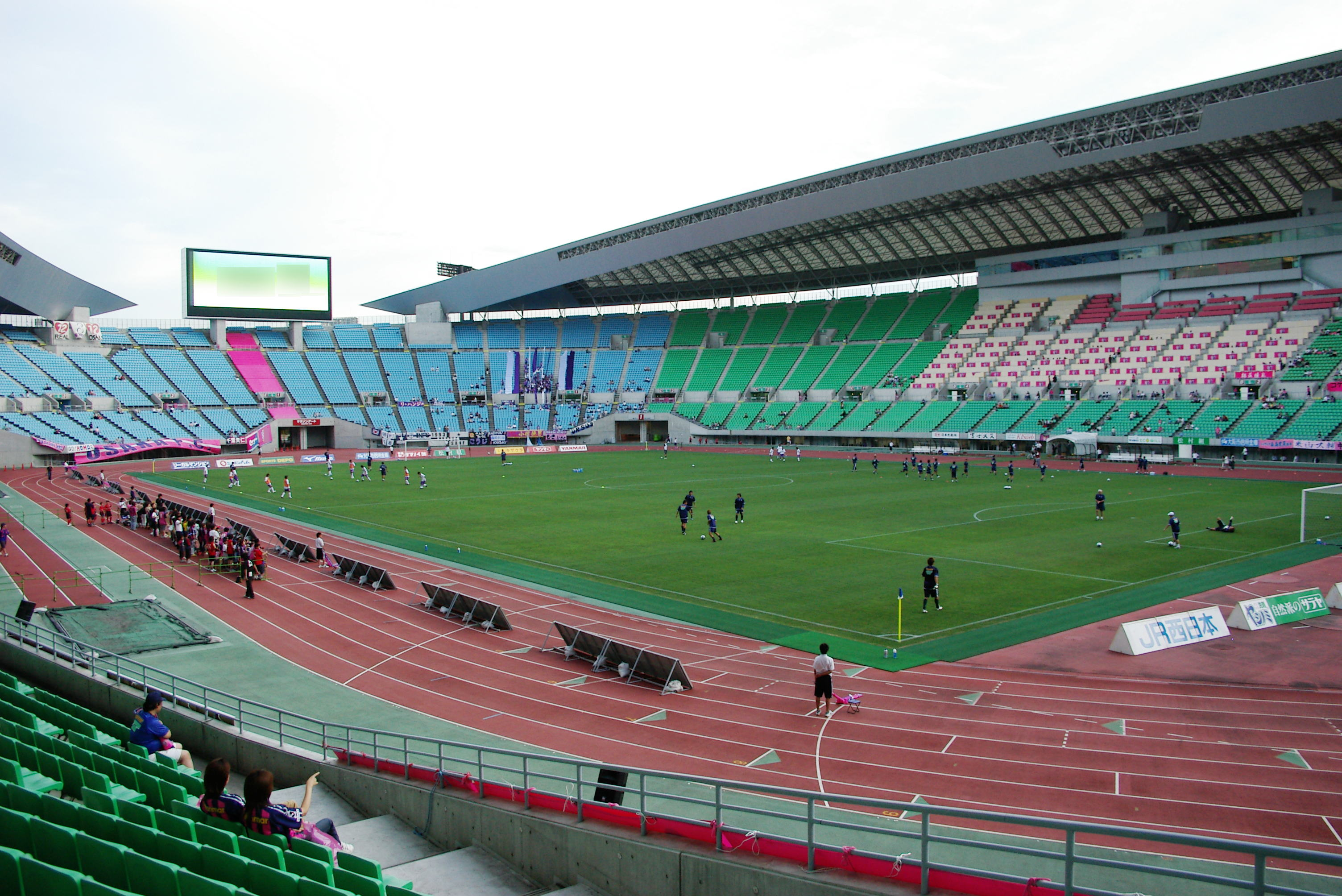
Nagai Stadium in Osaka hosted several football matches for the 1964 Summer Olympics in Tokyo.

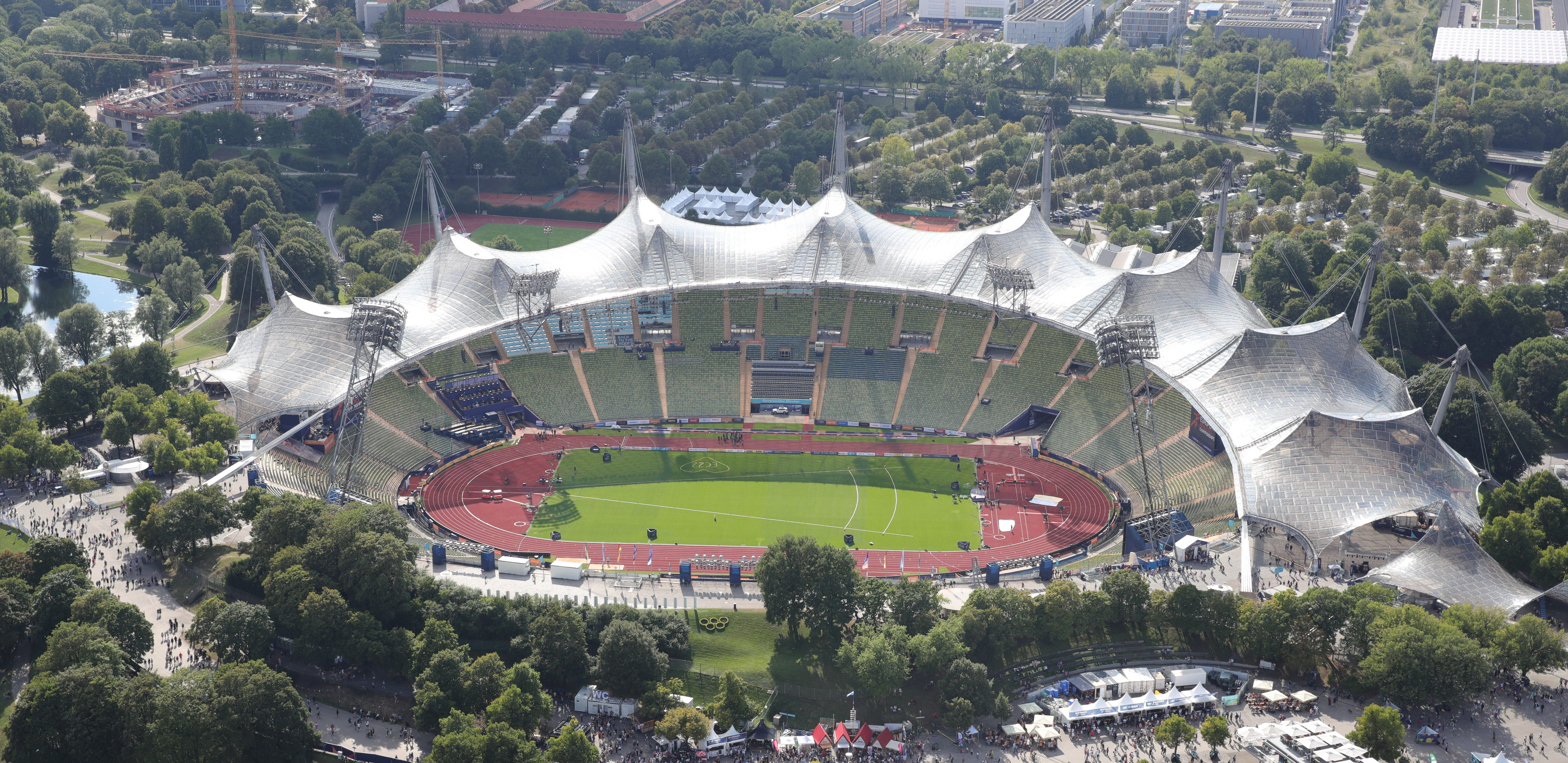
Olympiastadion hosted the football final at the 1972 Summer Olympics in Munich.

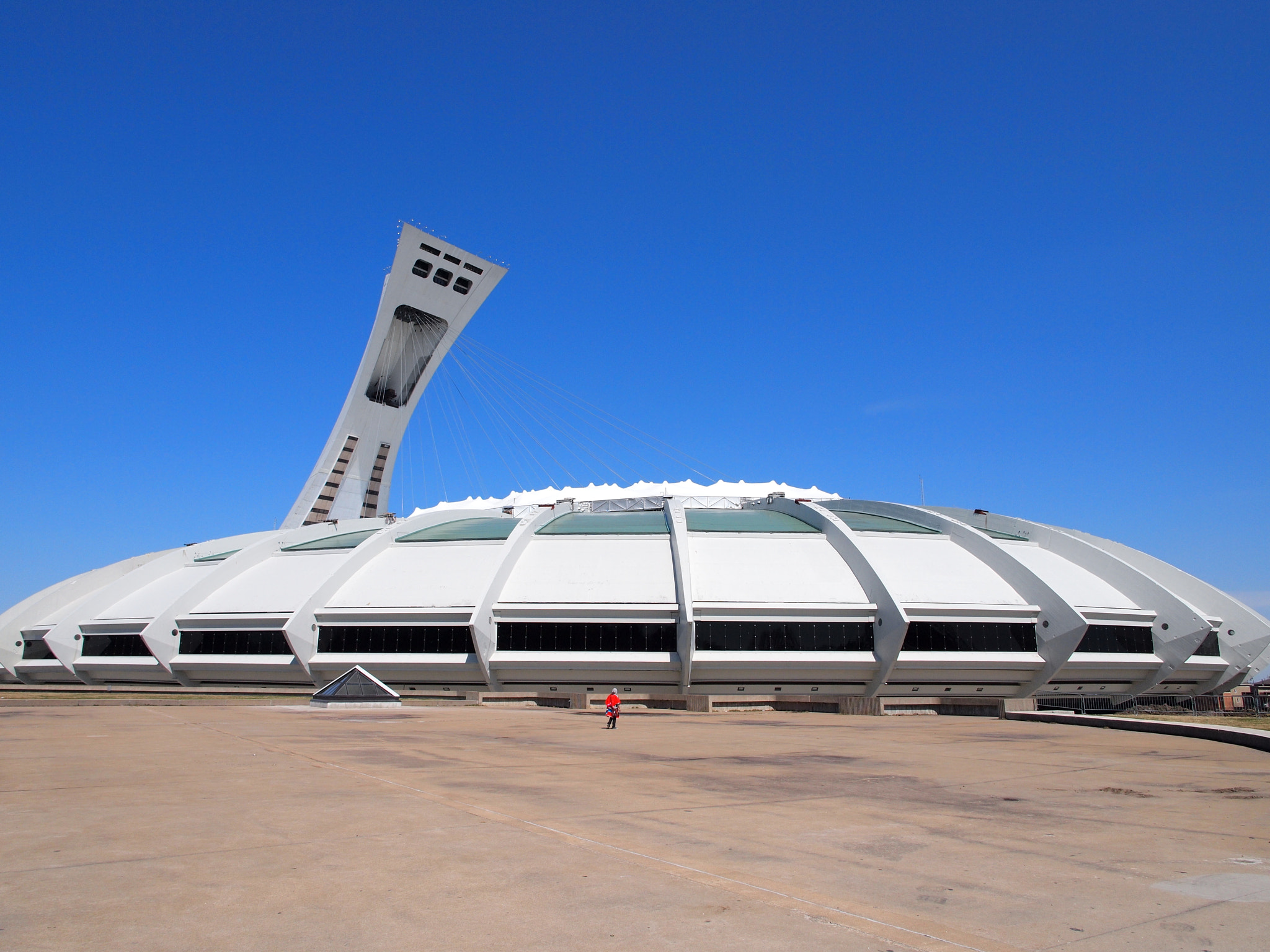
Stade Olympique hosted the football final at the 1976 Summer Olympics in Montreal.

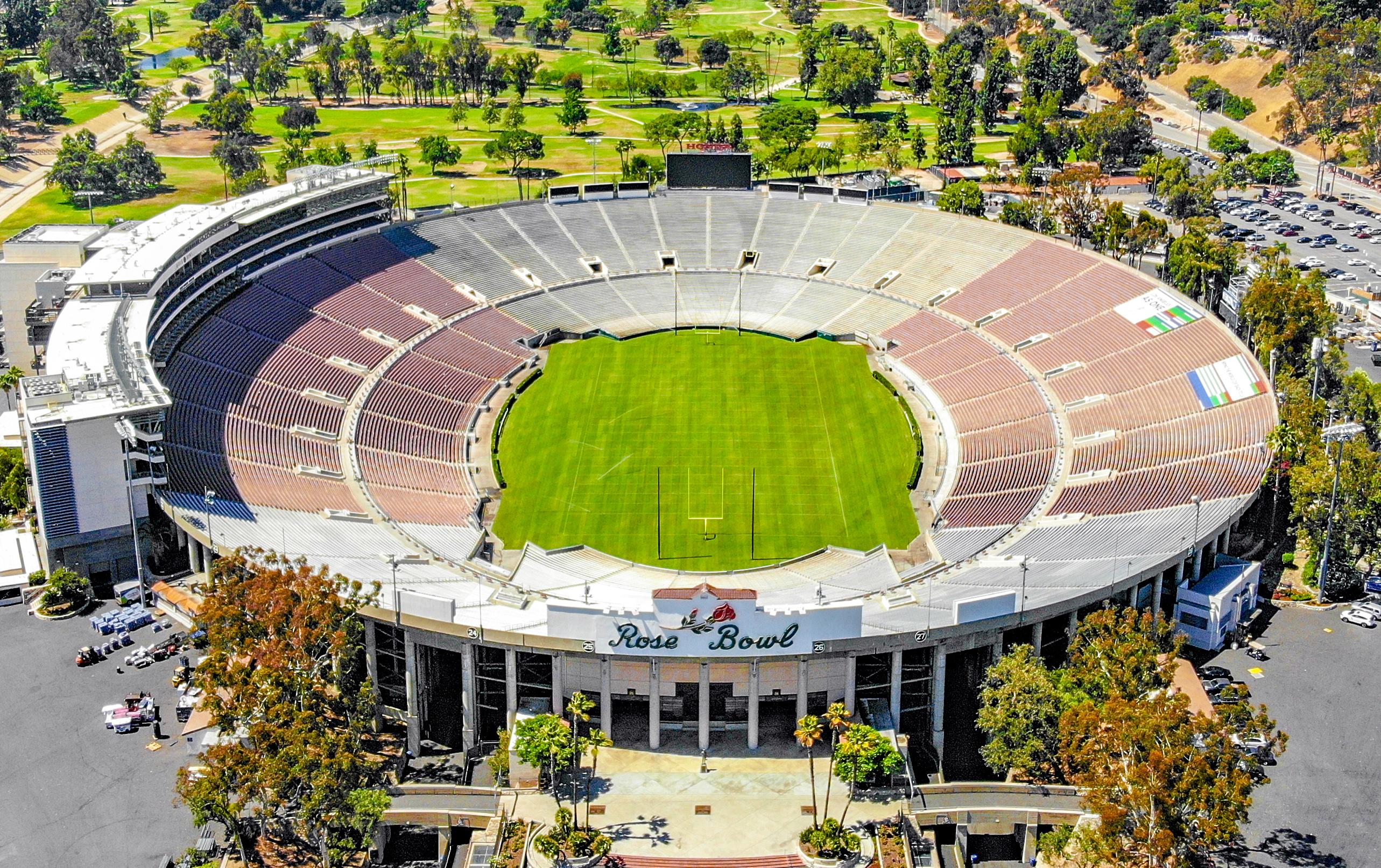
The Rose Bowl in Pasadena hosted the football final at the 1984 Summer Olympics in Los Angeles. It will host both football finals at the upcoming 2028 Summer Olympics.

Seoul Olympic Stadium hosted the football final at the 1988 Summer Olympics in Seoul.

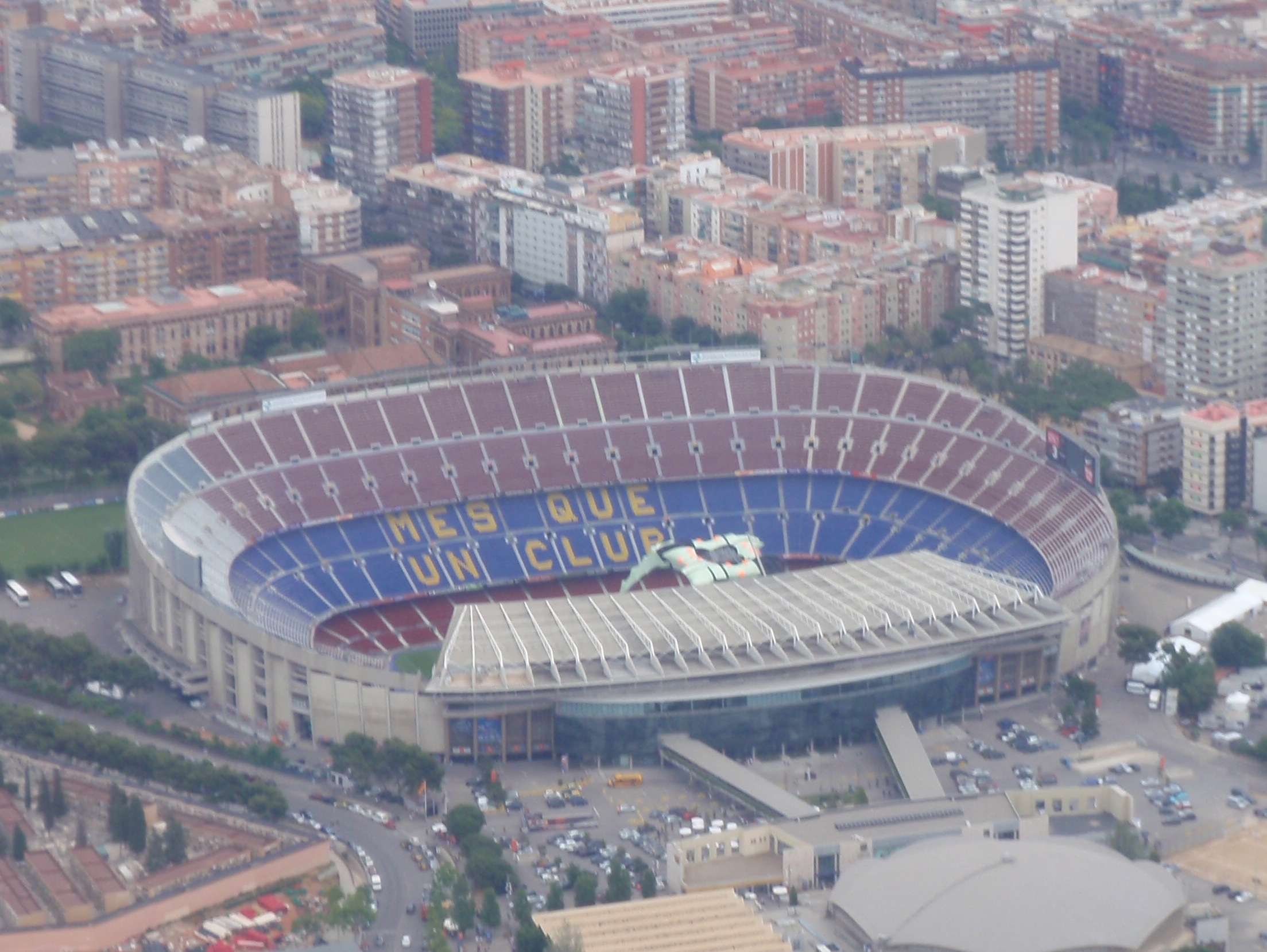
Camp Nou hosted the football final at the 1992 Summer Olympics in Barcelona.

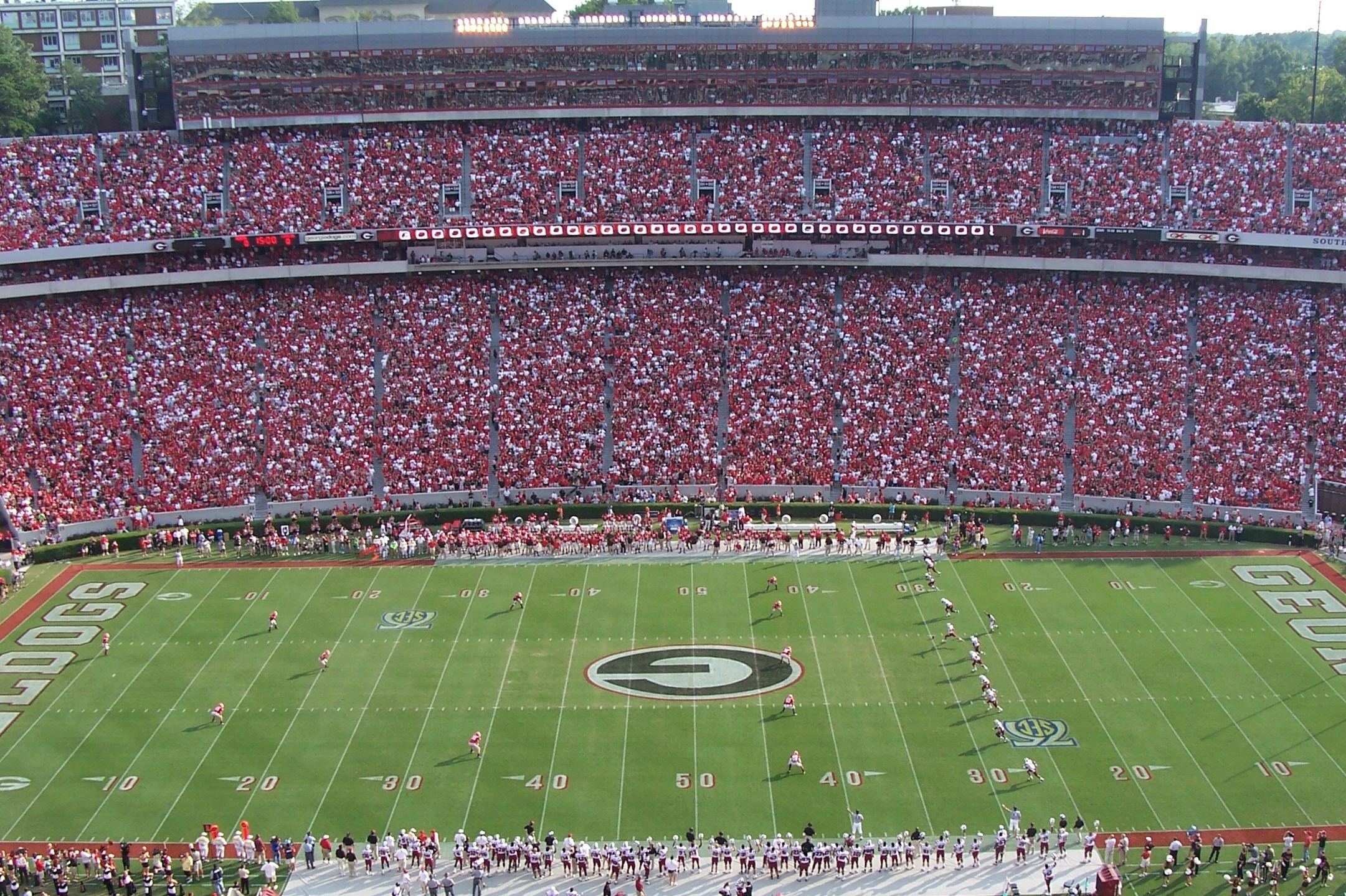
Sanford Stadium hosted both football finals for the 1996 Summer Olympics in Atlanta.

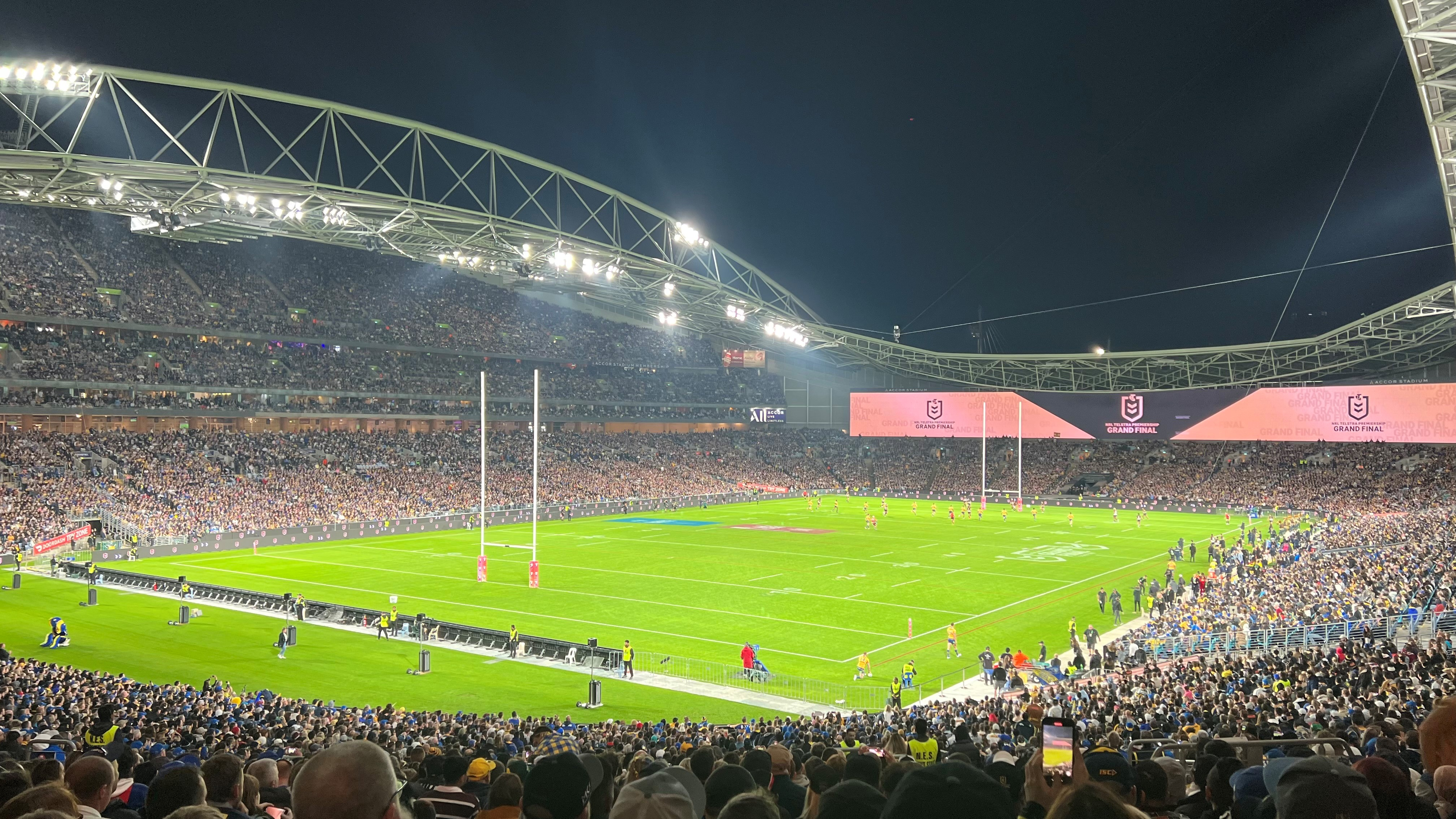
Stadium Australia hosted the men’s football final at the 2000 Summer Olympics in Sydney.

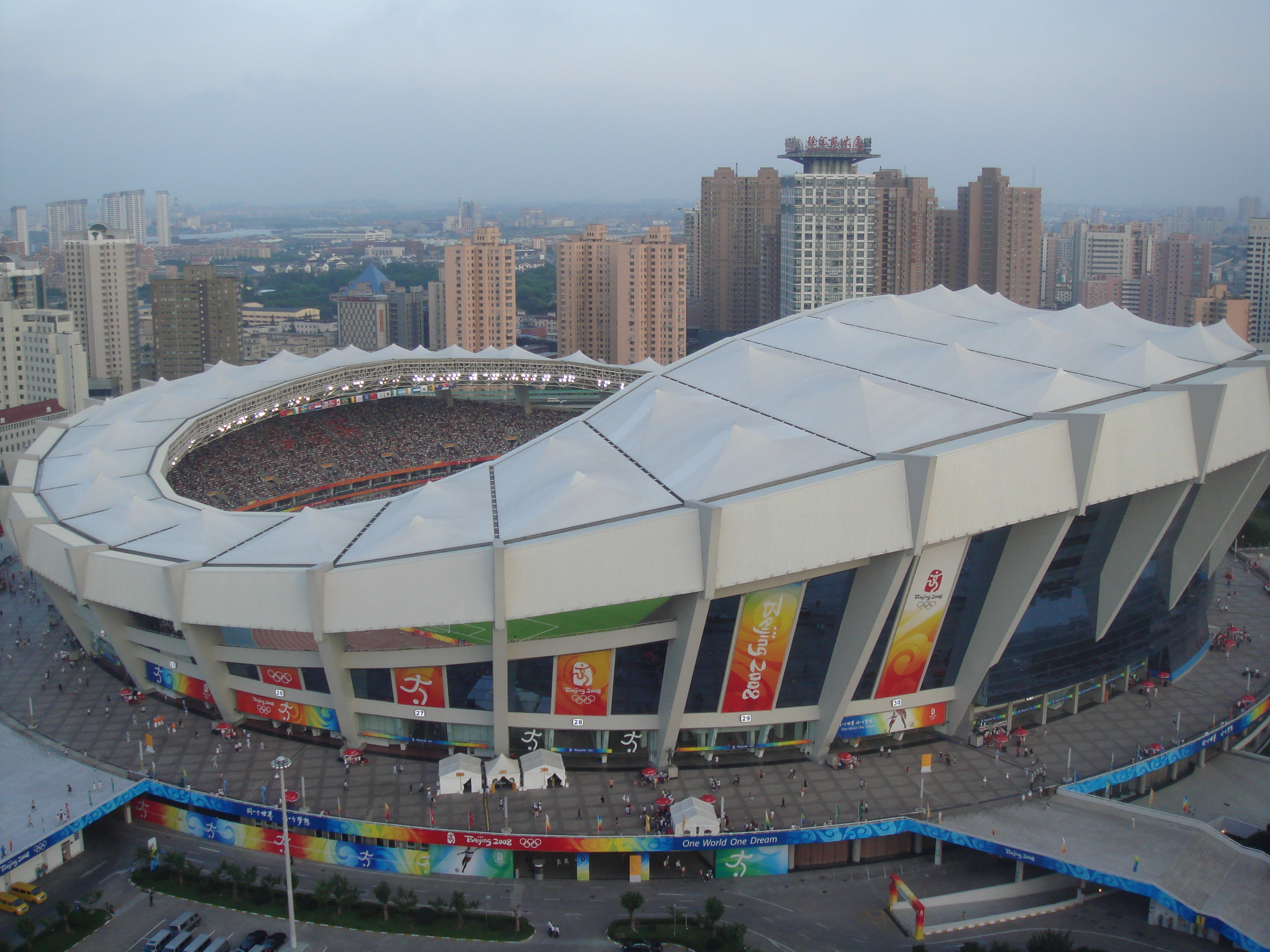
Shanghai Stadium hosted several football matches for the 2008 Summer Olympics in Beijing.

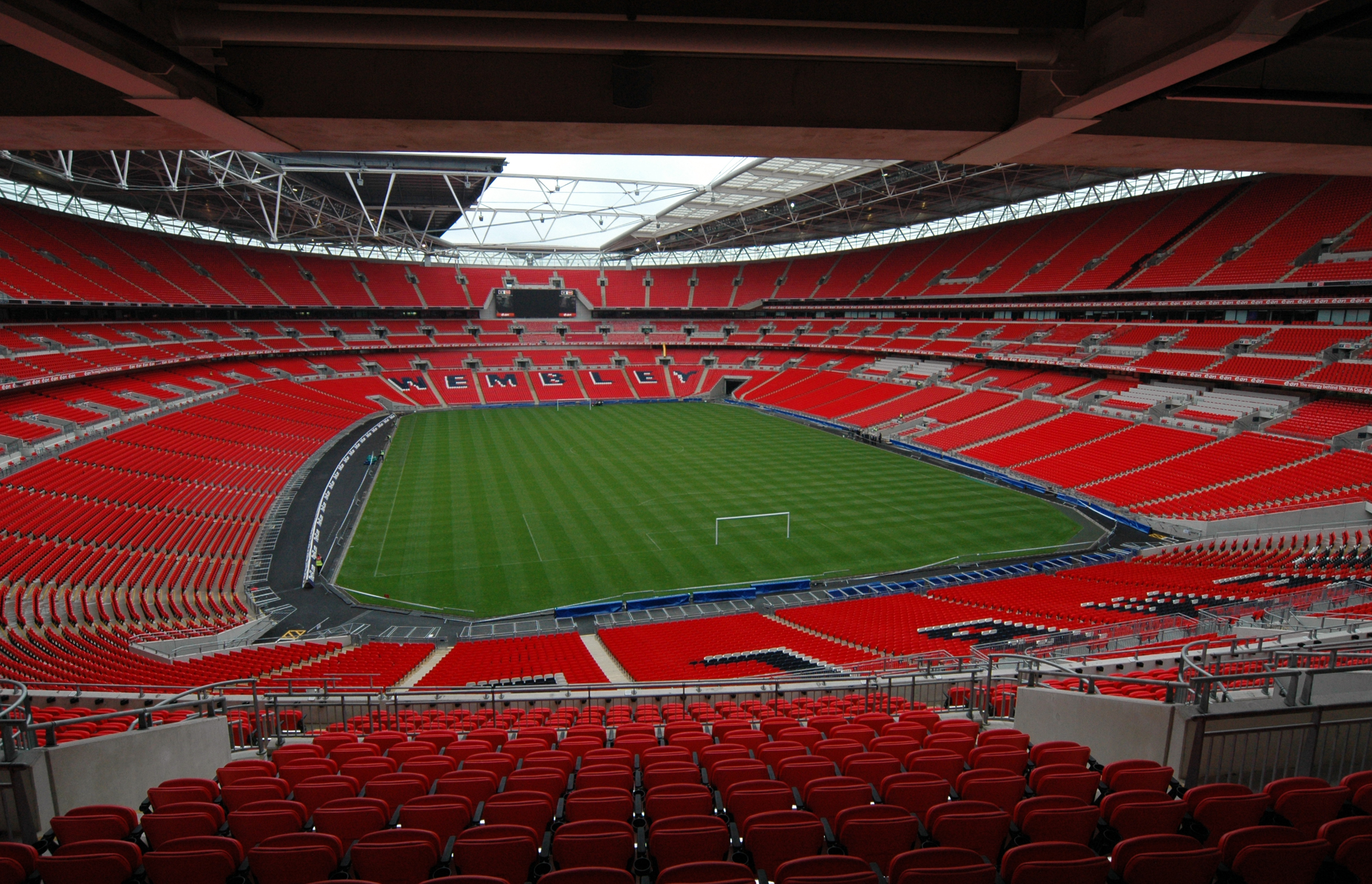
Wembley Stadium hosted both football finals at the 2012 Summer Olympics in London.

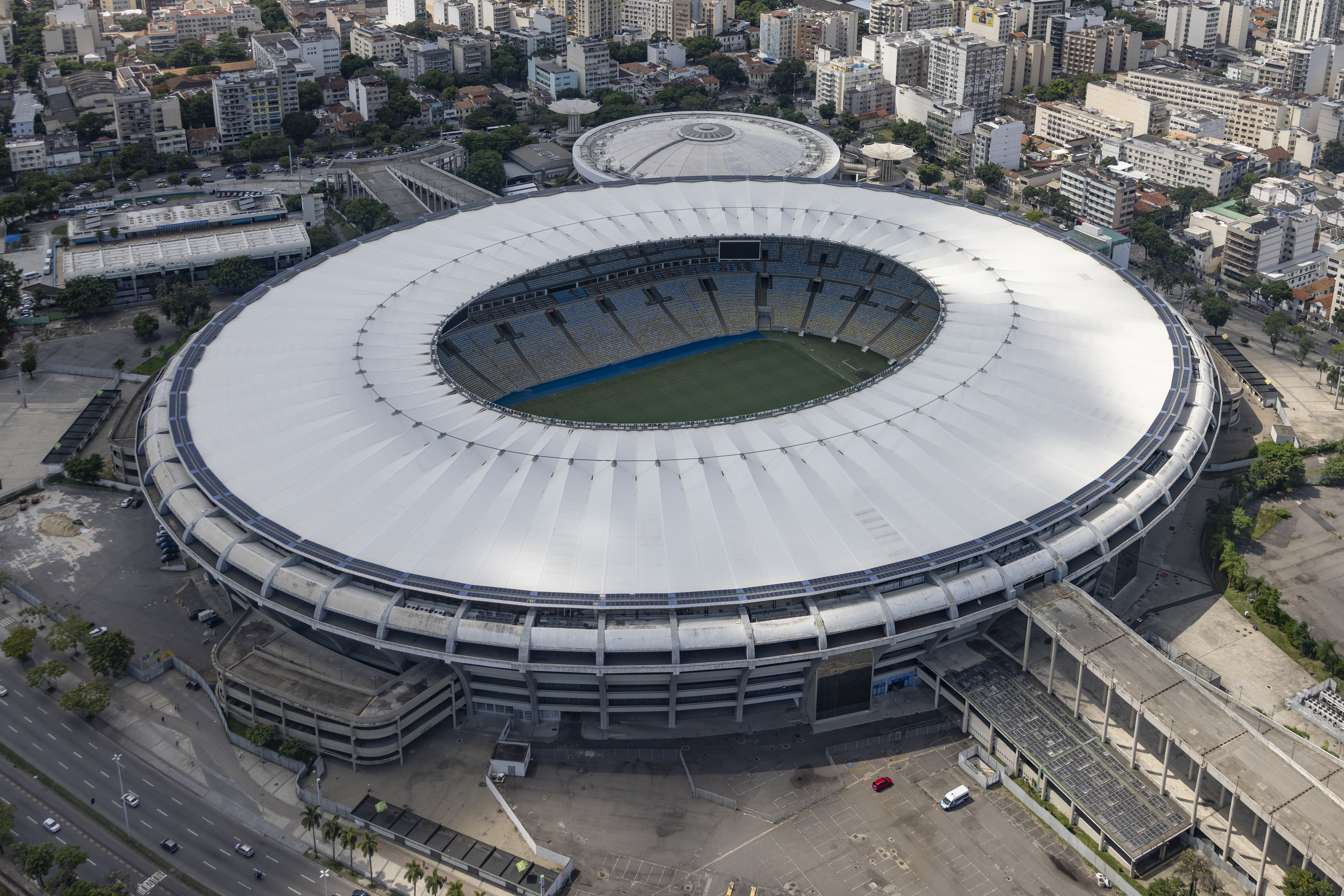
Maracanã Stadium hosted both football finals at the 2016 Summer Olympics in Rio de Janeiro.

Parc des Princes hosted both football finals at the 2024 Summer Olympics in Paris.
