= Printzlau =

Printzlau is a surname. Notable people with the surname include:

- Jonathan Printzlau (born 1976), Danish tennis player
- Leif Printzlau (born 1948), Danish footballer
- Olga Printzlau (1891–1962), American screenwriter
