= Vidáts =

Vidáts is a surname. Notable people with the surname include:

- Csaba Vidáts (born 1947), Hungarian footballer
- Réka Vidáts (born 1979), Hungarian tennis player.
