= Daniel Razo =

Mexican footballer (born 1950)

Personal information
- Date of birth: 26 September 1950 (age 76)
- Position: Defender

International career
Years	Team	Apps	(Gls)
- Mexico

Daniel Razo (born 26 September 1950) is a Mexican former footballer. He competed in the men's tournament at the 1972 Summer Olympics.
