= Jerzy Kraska =

Polish footballer (born 1951)

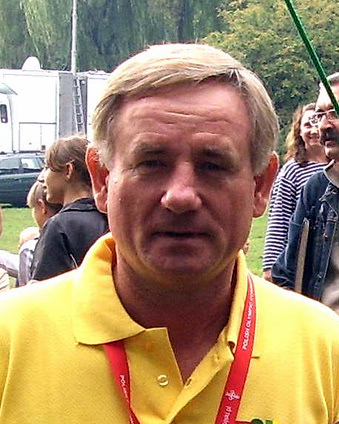
- Kraska in August 2007

Personal information
- Full name: Jerzy Adam Kraska
- Date of birth: 24 December 1951 (age 74)
- Place of birth: Płock, Poland
- Height: 1.76 m (5 ft 9 in)
- Position: Defender

Senior career*
Years	Team	Apps	(Gls)
1962–1969	Mazovia Płock		
1969–1983	Gwardia Warsaw	154	(3)
1983–1985	KuPS Kuopio	48	(0)
1986	Gwardia Warsaw	32	(0)

International career
1972–1973	Poland	13	(0)

Managerial career
- 1995: Polonia Warsaw
Medal record
Representing Poland
Men's football
Olympic Games
Gold medal – first place	1972 Munich	Team
- * Club domestic league appearances and goals

Jerzy Adam Kraska (born 24 December 1951) is a Polish former professional footballer who played as a defender.

On the national level, he played for Poland national team (13 matches) and was a participant at the 1972 Summer Olympics, where his team won the gold medal.

== Honours ==
Poland

- Olympic gold medal: 1972
