= Zygmunt Anczok =

Polish footballer (born 1946)

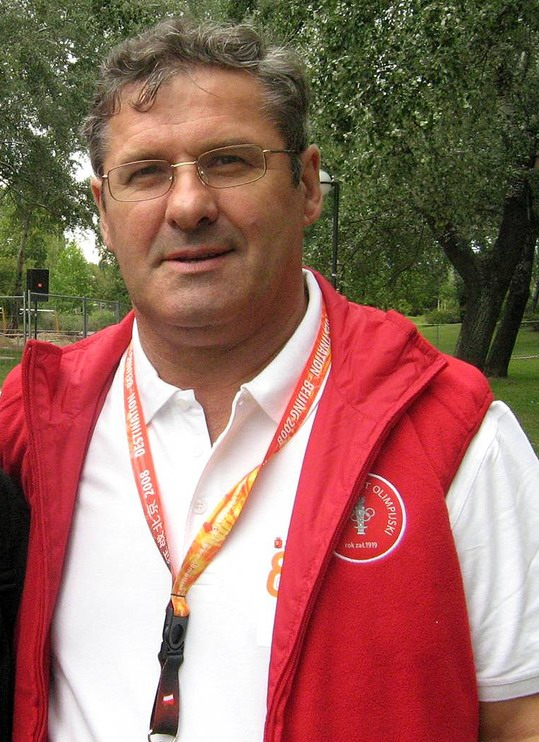

Personal information
- Full name: Zygmunt Józef Anczok
- Date of birth: 14 March 1946 (age 80)
- Place of birth: Lubliniec, Poland
- Height: 1.77 m (5 ft 9 1/2 in)
- Position: Left-back

Youth career
- 1959–1963: Sparta Lubliniec

Senior career*
Years	Team	Apps	(Gls)
1963–1971	Polonia Bytom	194	(0)
1971–1974	Górnik Zabrze	38	(0)
1975	SAC Wisła Chicago		
1975–1976	Chicago Cats		
1977–1979	Skeid Oslo	14	(0)

International career
1965–1973	Poland	48	(0)

Managerial career
- Sparta Lubliniec
Medal record
Men's football
Representing Poland
Olympic Games
Gold medal – first place	1972 Munich	Team
- * Club domestic league appearances and goals

Zygmunt Józef Anczok (born 14 March 1946) is a Polish former footballer who played as a left-back. He was an Olympic champion for Poland at the 1972 Summer Olympics.

His biggest success came in 1972 when he won the Polish Cup as well as appearing in several Polish international matches. His international career began in 1965 when he played against Scotland. At the time of his arrival in the national game, a player of such speed and agility was practically unheard of in Poland, and he frequently was substituted into games to bring to his teams extra power in not just defense, but attack.

Anczok was given an opportunity in 1966 to go on a tour of South America, where he more than held his own against players such as Pelé. Numerous minor injuries gave him problems throughout the years to come, including in the 1974 FIFA World Cup. He continued to play in Norway in the late seventies, before retiring as a player in 1979 and heading into management. He originally managed in Poland before health problems forced him into relinquishing his duties.

== Career statistics ==
=== International ===
Appearances and goals by national team and year
National team	Year	Apps	Goals
Poland	1965	3	0
Poland	1966	9	0
Poland	1967	5	0
Poland	1968	1	0
Poland	1969	8	0
Poland	1970	7	0
Poland	1971	5	0
Poland	1972	8	0
Poland	1973	2	0
Total		48	0

== Honours ==
Górnik Zabrze

- Ekstraklasa: 1971–72
- Polish Cup: 1971–72

Poland Olympic

- Summer Olympics: 1972
