= Frank Ganzera =

East German footballer (born 1947)

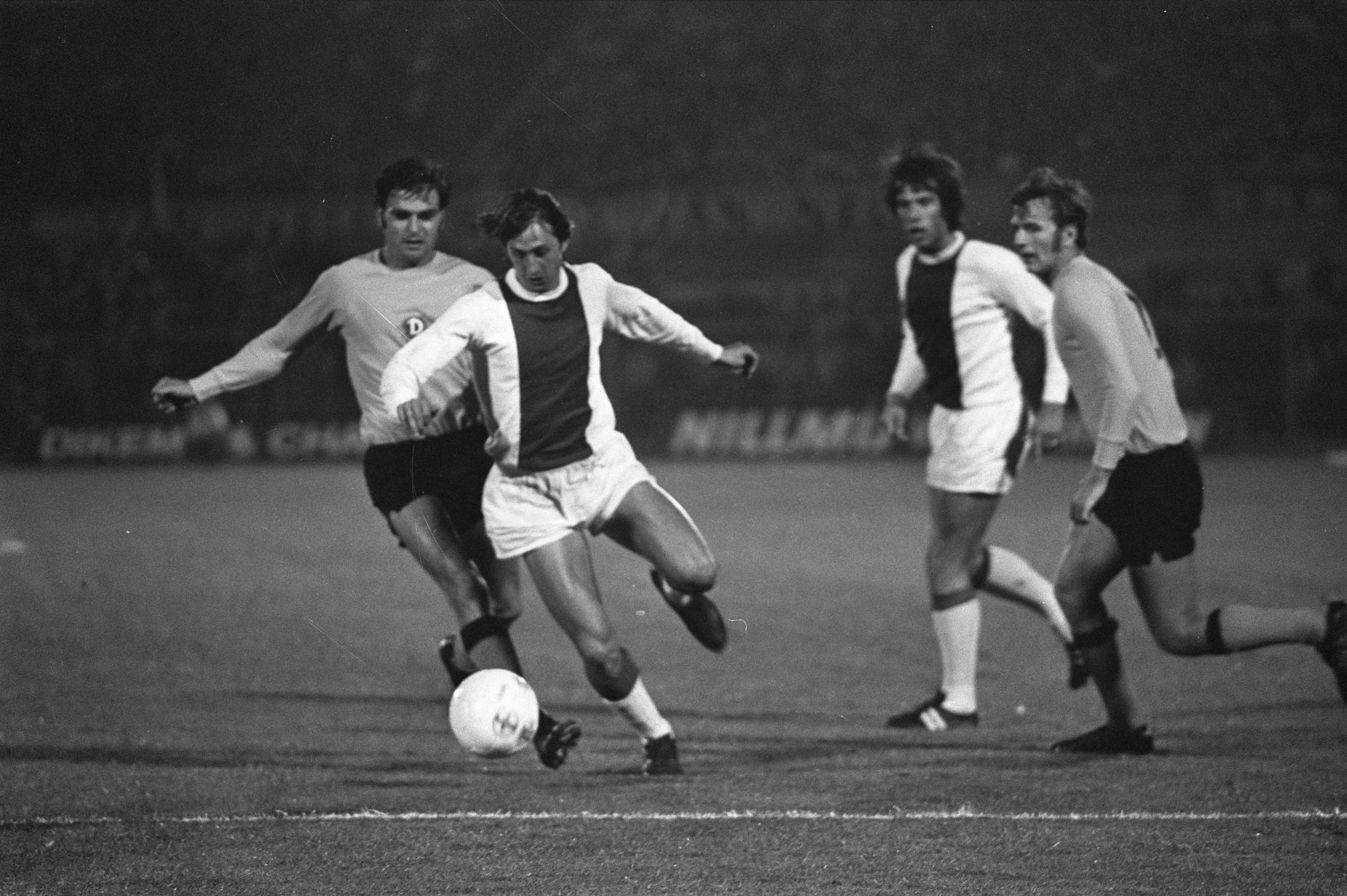
- Frank Ganzera (first from right) playing for Dynamo Dresden in a match against Ajax in 1971

Personal information
- Date of birth: 8 September 1947 (age 79)
- Place of birth: Dresden, Soviet occupation zone of Germany
- Height: 1.86 m (6 ft 1 in)
- Position: Right-back

Senior career*
Years	Team	Apps	(Gls)
1965–1966	Lokomotive Dresden		
1966–1976	Dynamo Dresden	133	(8)
1976–1978	Lokomotive Dresden		
Total		133	(8)

International career
1969–1973	East Germany	11	(0)
1972	East Germany Olympic	4	(1)

Managerial career
- 1978–1980: Lokomotive Dresden
Medal record
Representing East Germany
Olympic Games
Bronze medal – third place	1972 Munich	Team competition
- * Club domestic league appearances and goals

Frank Ganzera (born 8 September 1947, in Dresden) is a former East German footballer who played as a right-back. He played in the DDR Oberliga for Dynamo Dresden where he was East German champion in 1971 and 1973. He also won the FDGB Cup in 1971. For the GDR national team he played 13 times between 1969 and 1973 and was part of the bronze-medal-winning team at the 1972 Summer Olympics in Munich.
