= Mohamed Merzaq =

Moroccan footballer (born 1951)

Personal information
- Date of birth: 1951 (age 74–75)

Senior career*
Years	Team	Apps	(Gls)
- MC Oujda

International career
- Morocco
- * Club domestic league appearances and goals

Mohamed Merzaq (born 1951) is a Moroccan footballer. He competed in the men's tournament at the 1972 Summer Olympics . .
