= Viacheslav Semenov =

Ukrainian footballer (1947–2022)

Personal information
- Full name: Viacheslav Mykhailovych Semenov
- Date of birth: 18 August 1947
- Place of birth: Kyiv, Ukrainian SSR, Soviet Union
- Date of death: 12 August 2022 (aged 74)
- Height: 1.75 m (5 ft 9 in)
- Positions: Midfielder; striker

Youth career
- Dynamo Kyiv

Senior career*
Years	Team	Apps	(Gls)
1966–1969	Dynamo Kyiv	3	(0)
1969–1972	Zorya Voroshilovhrad	106	(23)
1973–1974	Dynamo Kyiv	22	(0)
1975	Dnipro Dnipropetrovsk	11	(1)
1976–1977	Zorya Voroshilovhrad	40	(9)
1978	SKA Kyiv		

International career
1972	USSR	11	(4)
Medal record
Representing Soviet Union
Men's Football
Bronze medal – third place	1972 Munich	Team competition
- * Club domestic league appearances and goals

Viacheslav Mykhailovych Semenov (Note: Ukrainian: В'ячеслав Михайлович Семeнов, Russian: Вячеслав Михайлович Семёнов, romanized: Vyacheslav Mikhaylovich Semyonov) (18 August 1947 – 12 August 2022) was a Ukrainian footballer played as a midfielder or striker.

== International career ==
Semenov made his debut for the USSR on 29 June 1972 in a friendly against Uruguay. He played in the 1974 FIFA World Cup qualifiers although the USSR did not qualify for the final tournament.

== Honours ==
Dynamo Kyiv

- Soviet Top League: 1967, 1968

Zorya Voroshilovhrad

- Soviet Top League: 1972

USSR

- Olympic bronze: 1972
