= Fabio Espinosa =

Colombian footballer (born 1948)

Personal information
- Date of birth: 13 June 1948 (age 78)
- Position: Midfielder

Senior career*
Years	Team	Apps	(Gls)
- Deportes Tolima
- * Club domestic league appearances and goals

Fabio Espinosa (born 13 June 1948) is a Colombian former footballer who competed in the 1972 Summer Olympics.
