= Leif Printzlau =

Danish footballer (born 1948)

Personal information
- Date of birth: 16 December 1948 (age 77)
- Place of birth: Nyborg, Denmark
- Height: 1.91 m (6 ft 3 in)
- Position: Left midfielder

Senior career*
Years	Team	Apps	(Gls)
1967–1977	Frem		

International career
1968–1972	Denmark U21	8	(0)
1968–1972	Denmark	7	(1)
- * Club domestic league appearances and goals

Leif Printzlau (born 16 December 1948) is a Danish former footballer who played as a left midfielder. He competed with the Denmark national team in the men's tournament at the 1972 Summer Olympics.
