= Rudolf Seliger =

German footballer

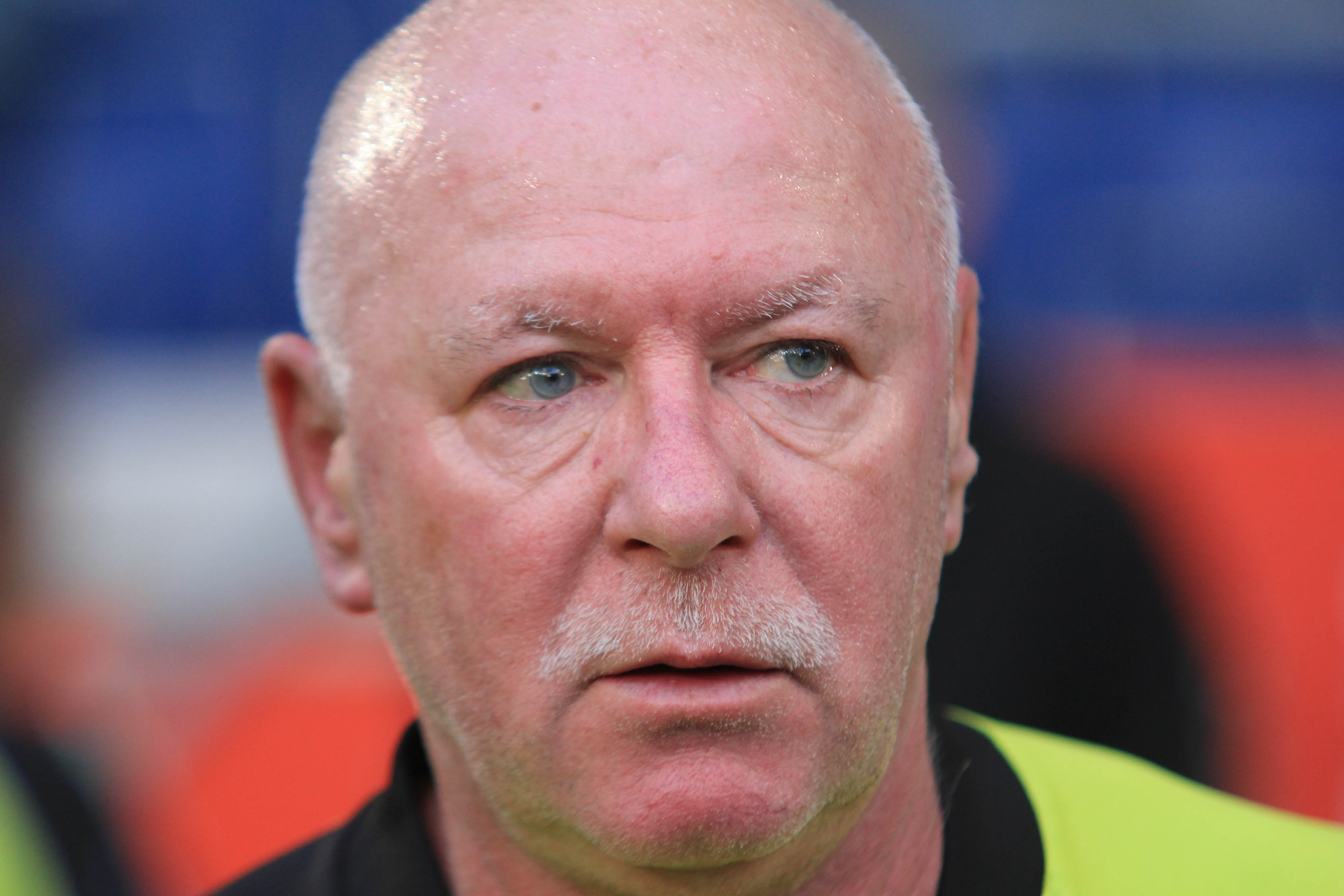
- Rudolf Seliger (2012)

Personal information
- Date of birth: 20 September 1951 (age 75)
- Place of birth: Mülheim an der Ruhr, West Germany
- Height: 1.76 m (5 ft 9 1/2 in)
- Position: Striker

Senior career*
Years	Team	Apps	(Gls)
1971–1983	MSV Duisburg	301	(66)

International career
1974–1976	West Germany	2	(0)
- * Club domestic league appearances and goals

Rudolf "Rudi" Seliger (born 20 September 1951) is a former football striker.
