= Dreiflüssestadion =

Stadium in Passau, Germany

Coordinates: 48°33′52″N 13°25′22″E

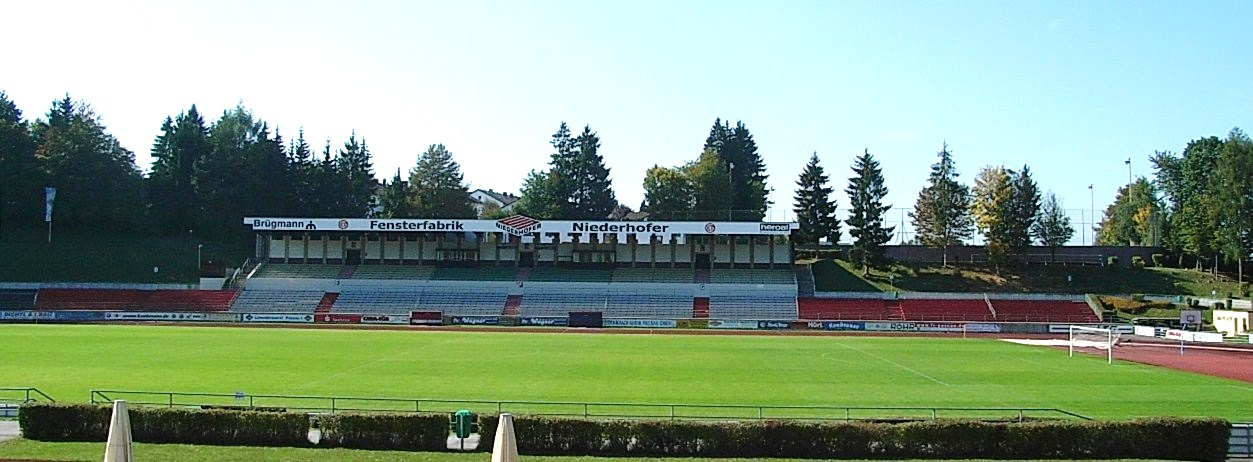
- Interactive map of Dreiflüssestadion
- Location: Passau, Germany
- Capacity: 20,000

Construction
- Opened: 1969

Tenant
- 1. FC Passau

Dreiflüssestadion (Three Rivers Stadium) is a multi-use stadium in Passau, Germany, used mostly for football matches. It is the home stadium of 1. FC Passau. The stadium, with a capacity of 20,000, was built in 1972. For the 1972 Summer Olympics in nearby Munich, it hosted six football matches.
