= Luis Montaño =

Colombian footballer (born 1950)

Personal information
- Date of birth: 11 August 1950
- Date of death: 26 May 2022 (aged 71)
- Height: 1.65 m (5 ft 5 in)
- Position: Forward

Senior career*
Years	Team	Apps	(Gls)
- Independiente Santa Fe
- * Club domestic league appearances and goals

Luis Montaño (11 August 1950 – 26 May 2022) was a Colombian footballer who competed in the 1972 Summer Olympics.
