= Péter Vépi =

Hungarian footballer

Personal information
- Date of birth: 20 October 1949 (age 77)
- Place of birth: Kőröshegy, Hungary
- Position: Defender

International career
Years	Team	Apps	(Gls)
- Hungary

Péter Vépi (born 20 October 1949) is a Hungarian former footballer. He competed in the men's tournament at the 1972 Summer Olympics.
