= Ede Dunai =

Hungarian footballer

Personal information
- Date of birth: 14 July 1949 (age 77)
- Place of birth: Budapest, Hungary
- Position: Midfielder

Senior career*
Years	Team	Apps	(Gls)
1967–1981	Újpesti Dózsa		

International career
1969–1975	Hungary	12	(2)
Medal record
Representing Hungary
Men's football
Silver medal – second place	1972 Munich	Team competition
- * Club domestic league appearances and goals

Ede Dunai (born 14 July 1949), also known as Dunai III, is a Hungarian former footballer who played as a midfielder for Újpesti Dózsa. Dunai III is most famous for his participation in the silver medal-winning Hungarian team on the 1972 Summer Olympics. He played 12 games for the Hungary national team and scored 2 goals.
