= ESV-Stadion =

Football stadium in Ingolstadt, Germany

Coordinates: 48°44′40″N 11°26′35″E

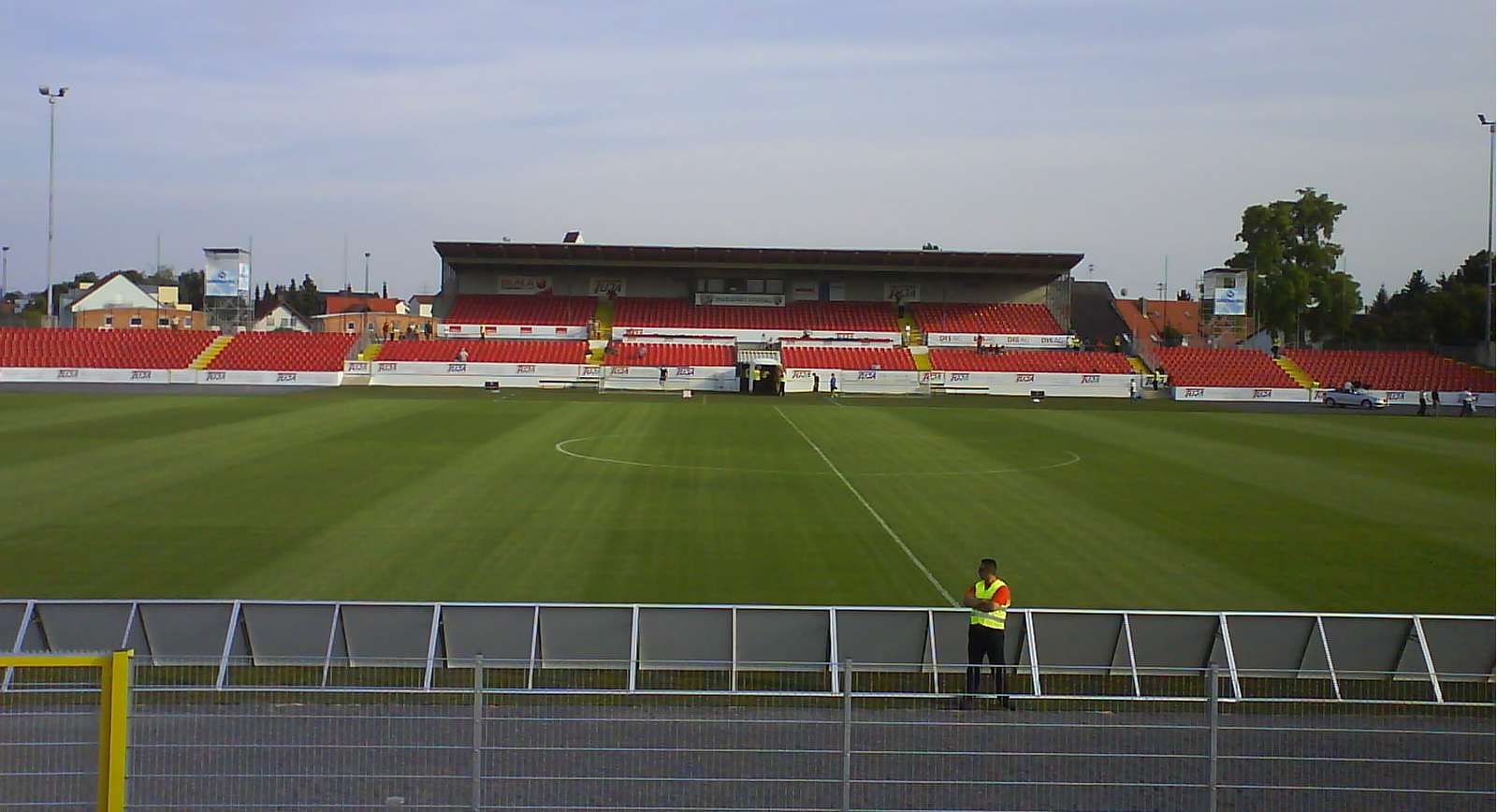
- Interactive map of ESV-Stadion
- Former names: Tuja-Stadion (2008–2010)
- Location: Ingolstadt, Germany
- Owner: Stadt Ingolstadt
- Capacity: 11,418
- Surface: grass

Construction
- Opened: 1932
- Renovated: 2008
- Cost: 2 million Euro (Renovation)

Tenants
- ESV Ingolstadt (1932–2004); FC Ingolstadt 04 (2004–2010); Ingolstadt Dukes

ESV-Stadion (formerly known as Tuja-Stadion from 2008 to 2010) is an 11,418 capacity stadium in Ingolstadt, Germany. It is primarily used for football and was the home of ESV Ingolstadt until they merged with MTV Ingolstadt to become FC Ingolstadt 04. It also hosted four football matches during the 1972 Summer Olympics. The stadium was modified in 2008 to suit 2nd division criteria. A new stadium was built and completed before the 2010/11 season.
