= Ádám Rothermel =

Hungarian footballer (1948–2026)

Personal information
- Date of birth: 14 June 1948
- Place of birth: Budapest, Hungary
- Date of death: 7 November 2026 (aged 78)
- Height: 1.90 m (6 ft 3 in)
- Position: Goalkeeper

Senior career*
| Years | Team | Apps | (Gls) |
- Tatabányai Bányász
- Újpest
- Salgótarjáni BTC

International career
- Hungary
- * Club domestic league appearances and goals

Ádám Rothermel (14 June 1948 – 6 November 2026) was a Hungarian footballer who played as a goalkeeper. He competed in the men's tournament at the 1972 Summer Olympics, winning a silver medal. Rothermel died on 6 November 2026, aged 78.
