= Kálmán Tóth (footballer) =

Hungarian footballer

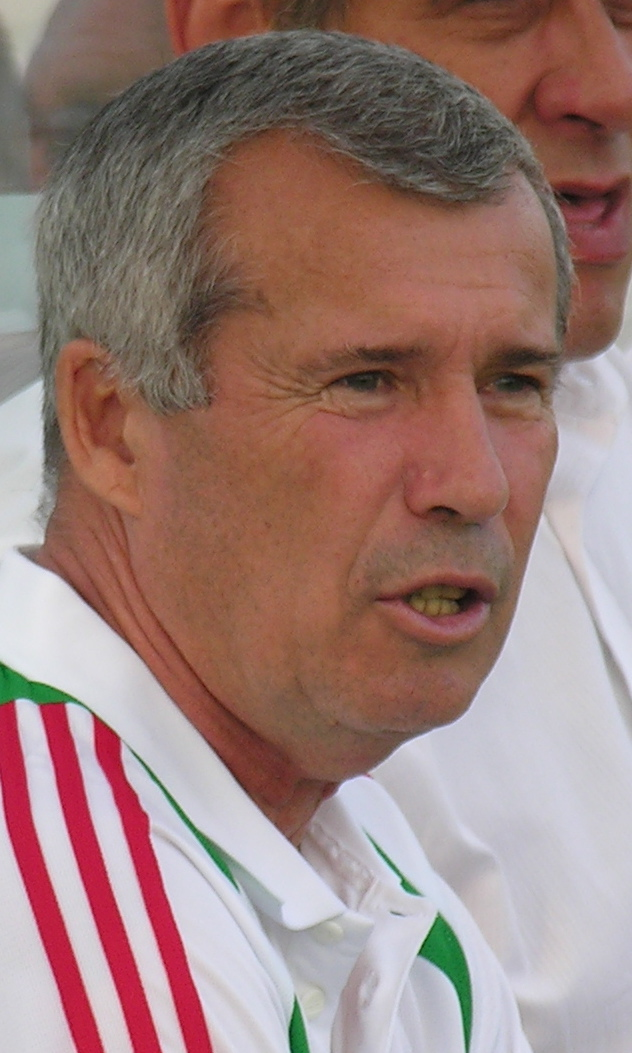
- Kálmán Tóth in 2011

Personal information
- Date of birth: 13 August 1944 (age 82)
- Place of birth: Szombathely, Hungary
- Position: Forward

Senior career*
Years	Team	Apps	(Gls)
1963–1964	Győri MÁV DAC		
1964–1969	Budapest Honvéd FC		
1970–1974	FC Tatabánya		
1975–1979	Budafoki MTE		

International career
1972	Hungary		
- * Club domestic league appearances and goals

Kálmán Tóth (born 13 August 1944) is a Hungarian footballer. He competed in the men's tournament at the 1972 Summer Olympics.
