= József Kovács (footballer) =

Hungarian footballer

Personal information
- Date of birth: 8 April 1949 (age 77)
- Place of birth: Balatonlelle, Hungary
- Height: 1.81 m (5 ft 11 in)
- Position: Defender

Youth career
- 1964–1968: Videoton SC

Senior career*
| Years | Team | Apps | (Gls) |
| 1968–1980 | Videoton SC | | |
| 1980–1985 | Újpesti Dózsa | | |

International career
| 1971–1979 | Hungary | 18 | (0) |
Medal record
Men's football
Representing Hungary
Men's football
| Silver medal – second place | 1972 Munich | Team competition |
- * Club domestic league appearances and goals

József Kovács (born 8 April 1949 in Balatonlelle) is a Hungarian former football midfielder who played for Videoton SC and Újpesti Dózsa.

He won a silver medal in football at the 1972 Summer Olympics, and also participated in UEFA Euro 1972 for the Hungary national football team.

== Honours ==
Újpesti Dózsa

- Magyar Kupa: 1981–82, 1982–83

Hungary

- Summer Olympics runner-up: 1972

== Sources ==
- Ki kicsoda a magyar sportéletben?, II. kötet (I–R). Szekszárd, Babits Kiadó, 1995, 173. o., ISBN 963-495-011-6 (in Hungarian)
- Botos István: A Videoton labdarúgó krónikája (Székesfehérvár, 1991) ISBN 963-7686-00-2 (in Hungarian)
- Rejtő László–Lukács László–Szepesi György: Felejthetetlen 90 percek (Sportkiadó, 1977) ISBN 963-253-501-4 (in Hungarian)
