= Attila Császári =

Hungarian swimmer

Personal information
- Born: 1 January 1954 (age 72) Budapest, Hungary

Sport
- Sport: Swimming

Attila Császári (born 1 January 1954) is a Hungarian former swimmer. He competed in two events at the 1972 Summer Olympics.
