= Csaba Vidáts =

Hungarian footballer

Personal information
- Date of birth: 22 November 1947 (age 78)
- Place of birth: Szany, Hungary
- Position: Defender

International career
Years	Team	Apps	(Gls)
- Hungary

Csaba Vidáts (born 22 November 1947) is a Hungarian former footballer. He competed in the men's tournament at the 1972 Summer Olympics.
