= List of Malta international footballers (1–9 caps) =

The Malta national football team represents the country of Malta in international association football and is controlled by the Malta Football Association (MFA), the local governing body of football which was founded in 1900. The MFA became a member of the Fédération Internationale de Football Association (FIFA) in 1959 and a year later joined the Union of European Football Associations (UEFA). Prior to that, on 24 February 1957, the team played its first official international match at the Empire Stadium against Austria, a 3–2 defeat. The first goal was scored by Tony Cauchi.

As of April 2026, Malta has played 463 international fixtures, winning 66, drawing 77 and losing 320. The team's most frequent opponent has been Iceland, meeting the side 15 times, winning 3, drawing 1 and losing 11. In global and continental competitions, Malta has competed in qualification groups for both the UEFA European Championship, since 1962, and the FIFA World Cup, since 1974, but has failed to qualify for any tournament finals.

Since 1957, more than 300 players have made at least one international appearance for the team. The following is a list of all the players with between 1 and 9 caps for Malta.

== Key ==
Positions key
GK	Goalkeeper
DF	Defender
MF	Midfielder
FW	Forward

Position
Playing positions are listed according to the player's preferred position, and not based on tactical formations that were employed at the time.
Caps and goals
Caps and goals are composed of FIFA World Cup, UEFA European Championship matches and each competition's required qualification matches, as well as numerous international friendly tournaments and matches.

== Players ==
Player	Position	Caps	Goals	Date of debut	Debut against	Date of last match	Last match against	Ref
Tony Cauchi	FW	9	2	24 February 1957	Austria	3 July 1962	Norway	
Cleavon Frendo	MF	9	1	14 February 2004	Moldova	10 September 2008	Albania	
Lolly Borg	MF	9	1	24 February 1957	Austria	8 December 1962	Denmark	
Joe Grima	DF	9	0	8 March 1964	Italy C (Note: The match is recognised as an official International A Match by the Malta Football Association)	14 November 1971	Hungary	
John Bonett	FW	9	0	13 February 1966	Libya	8 December 1971	Algeria	
Eddie Vella	FW	9	0	11 October 1970	Greece	21 December 1975	Bulgaria	
Manny Muscat	MF	9	0	5 June 2009	Czech Republic	2 September 2011	Croatia	
Udo Nwoko	FW	9	0	13 November 2007	Hungary	15 October 2008	Hungary	
Steven Bezzina	DF	9	0	18 November 2009	Bulgaria	28 March 2015	Azerbaijan	
Carlo Zammit Lonardelli	DF	9	0	21 March 2024	Slovenia	4 October 2026	Andorra	
Basil Tuma	FW	9	0	13 October 2024	Moldova	4 October 2026	Andorra	
Pullu Demanuele	FW	8	3	24 February 1957	Austria	3 July 1962	Norway	
Richard Aquilina	MF	8	1	22 December 1974	West Germany	25 October 1978	Wales	
Michael Cutajar	MF	8	1	26 May 1992	Latvia	8 June 1999	FR Yugoslavia	
Frankie Micallef	MF	8	0	27 April 1969	Austria	29 October 1977	East Germany	
Vincent Borg Bonaci	GK	8	0	27 April 1969	Austria	30 April 1972	Austria	
Charles Micallef	FW	8	0	11 October 1970	Greece	25 November 1972	Austria	
Charles Spiteri	DF	8	0	8 December 1971	Algeria	11 November 1973	Sweden	
Alfred Azzopardi	DF	8	0	23 May 1984	Sweden	12 October 1985	Portugal	
Michael Galea	FW	8	0	6 August 1997	Hungary	17 November 2004	Hungary	
Nenad Veselji	FW	8	0	24 November 1999	Lebanon	15 November 2000	Albania	
Karl Micallef	DF	8	0	26 March 2019	Spain	17 November 2022	Greece	
Sammy Nicholl	FW	7	1	24 February 1957	Austria	8 December 1962	Denmark	
Josie Urpani	FW	7	1	8 December 1962	Denmark	13 February 1966	Libya	
Silvio Demanuele	FW	7	1	30 March 1983	Republic of Ireland	21 December 1983	Spain	
Andrea Zammit	FW	7	1	14 November 2025	Finland	4 October 2026	Andorra	
Frank Zammit	DF	7	0	8 March 1959	Tunisia	8 March 1964	Italy C	
John Privitera	DF	7	0	28 June 1962	Denmark	20 December 1970	Switzerland	
Leli Micallef	DF	7	0	11 October 1970	Greece	15 October 1972	Sweden	
Charles Scerri	DF	7	0	14 November 1971	Hungary	28 September 1973	Canada	
Raymond Mifsud	GK	7	0	23 May 1984	Sweden	16 November 1986	Sweden	
Charles Micallef	FW	7	0	7 February 1988	Finland	1 June 1988	Wales	
Digger Okonkwo	DF	7	0	21 August 1999	Croatia	28 February 2001	Sweden	
Aaron Xuereb	DF	7	0	22 August 2007	Albania	15 October 2008	Hungary	
Sam Magri	DF	7	0	11 November 2016	Slovenia	4 September 2017	Scotland	
Keyon Ewurum	FW	7	0	7 June 2025	Lithuania	1 October 2026	Gibraltar	
Olivier Losco	DF	6	3	28 February 1976	West Germany	28 August 1979	Tunisia	
Charles Muscat	FW	6	2	23 May 1984	Sweden	10 February 1985	Portugal	
Toninu Camilleri	FW	6	1	25 November 1972	Austria	4 June 1975	Greece	
Antoine Zahra	FW	6	1	11 December 2003	Poland	27 May 2004	Germany	
Ġużi Bonnici	DF	6	0	24 February 1957	Austria	3 July 1962	Norway	
Alfred Delia	MF	6	0	27 April 1969	Austria	8 December 1971	Algeria	
Bertu Carter	DF	6	0	24 August 1974	Libya	4 April 1981	East Germany	
Sunny Gouder	DF	6	0	4 September 1974	Libya	24 November 1976	Tunisia	
Chris Vella	MF	6	0	21 December 1975	Bulgaria	4 March 1978	Tunisia	
David Buckingham	DF	6	0	25 February 1979	West Germany	27 February 1980	West Germany	
Simon Vella	DF	6	0	9 February 2002	Jordan	7 June 2003	Cyprus	
Saviour Darmanin	GK	6	0	11 February 2002	Lithuania	9 February 2005	Norway	
Josef Mifsud	DF	6	0	22 August 2007	Albania	20 August 2008	Estonia	
Ryan Scicluna	DF	6	0	4 September 2014	Slovakia	15 November 2016	Iceland	
Clifford Gatt Baldacchino	DF	6	0	14 August 2013	Azerbaijan	12 November 2017	Estonia	
Simon Tortell	DF	5	1	25 October 1978	Wales	21 December 1983	Spain	
Jonathan Magri Overend	MF	5	1	6 February 1998	Albania	6 September 1998	Macedonia	
Lino Falzon	DF	5	0	28 June 1962	Denmark	27 March 1966	Libya	
Louis Pace	DF	5	0	12 May 1971	England	6 May 1972	Hungary	
Robert Gatt	GK	5	0	23 February 1975	Greece	25 October 1978	Wales	
Lawrence Borg	DF	5	0	10 March 1976	Libya	29 October 1977	East Germany	
Joe Gatt	FW	5	0	23 May 1984	Sweden	16 December 1984	West Germany	
Edward Azzopardi	DF	5	0	28 April 1999	Iceland	28 May 2000	South Africa	
Adrian Ciantar	MF	5	0	20 January 2000	Qatar	3 June 2000	England	
Trevor Cilia	MF	5	0	25 February 2006	Moldova	10 August 2011	Central African Republic	
Trent Buhagiar	DF	5	0	13 October 2024	Moldova	26 March 2026	Luxembourg	
Rashed Al-Tumi	GK	5	0	26 March 2024	Belarus	27 September 2026	Liechtenstein	
Jan Busuttil	MF	4	1	11 November 2020	Liechtenstein	27 September 2022	Israel	
Louis Theobald	DF	4	0	8 December 1960	Georgia	8 December 1962	Denmark	
Alfred Mallia	DF	4	0	4 January 1970	Luxembourg	21 April 1971	Switzerland	
Jimmy Briffa	DF	4	0	15 March 1972	Algeria	15 October 1972	Sweden	
Eric Schembri	FW	4	0	24 August 1974	Libya	27 February 1980	West Germany	
Silvio Camilleri	MF	4	0	11 December 1988	Hungary	12 February 1989	Finland	
Djibril Sylla	MF	4	0	28 May 2000	South Africa	2 September 2000	Northern Ireland	
Orosco Anonam	MF	4	0	17 August 2005	Northern Ireland	25 February 2006	Moldova	
Jake Galea	GK	4	0	7 October 2020	Gibraltar	1 June 2022	Venezuela	
Jake Azzopardi	MF	4	0	10 June 2025	Netherlands	27 September 2026	Liechtenstein	
Salvinu Schembri	FW	3	1	24 February 1957	Austria	15 May 1958	Italy U-23	
Lolly Debattista	DF	3	0	24 February 1957	Austria	3 July 1962	Norway	
Victor Scerri	GK	3	0	24 February 1957	Austria	8 December 1960	Tunisia	
Raymond Cosby	GK	3	0	15 May 1958	Italy U-23	18 June 1961	Italy C	
Joe Zammit	DF	3	0	8 December 1960	Tunisia	5 November 1961	Norway	
Alfred Borg	FW	3	0	18 June 1961	Italy C	4 January 1970	Luxembourg	
Alfred Debono	DF	3	0	27 April 1969	Austria	25 November 1972	Austria	
Joe Farrugia	FW	3	0	18 June 1971	Greece	15 March 1972	Algeria	
Charles Brincat	MF	3	0	28 September 1973	Canada	14 May 1978	Libya	
Joe Borg	DF	3	0	22 December 1974	West Germany	11 June 1975	Bulgaria	
Ray Farrugia	FW	3	0	6 August 1977	Tunisia	21 December 1983	Spain	
Joseph Salerno	DF	3	0	19 December 1982	Netherlands	15 May 1983	Spain	
Noel Attard	FW	3	0	26 December 1982	Bulgaria	16 November 1983	Republic of Ireland	
Michael Grixti	DF	3	0	6 September 1984	Israel	3 April 1985	Jordan	
Mario Schembri	FW	3	0	16 November 1986	Sweden	2 December 1987	Israel	
John Micallef	MF	3	0	14 October 1987	England B	13 February 1988	East Germany	
Edmund Zammit	DF	3	0	10 February 1990	South Korea	10 February 1992	Iceland	
Bernard Licari	FW	3	0	5 May 1990	United States	2 June 1990	Republic of Ireland	
Sean Sullivan	GK	3	0	19 April 1994	Azerbaijan	11 February 1996	Iceland	
Graham Bencini	DF	3	0	27 January 1999	Bosnia and Herzegovina	10 February 1999	FR Yugoslavia	
Chris Okoh	DF	3	0	28 February 2001	Sweden	6 June 2001	Denmark	
Miguel Mifsud	MF	3	0	27 March 2002	Andorra	20 November 2002	Cyprus	
Clyde Borg	MF	3	0	11 November 2015	Jordan	8 October 2017	Slovakia	
Llywelyn Cremona	MF	3	0	11 November 2015	Jordan	31 May 2016	Austria	
James Brown	DF	3	0	1 June 2022	Venezuela	26 March 2023	Italy	
Luke Tabone	DF	3	0	11 June 2024	Greece	14 November 2024	Liechtenstein	
Kean Scicluna	MF	3	0	9 September 2025	San Marino	27 September 2026	Liechtenstein	
Kevin Cannavò	FW	3	0	1 June 2026	Slovakia	27 September 2026	Liechtenstein	
Charles Brincat	DF	2	0	25 January 1958	Denmark	15 May 1958	Italy U-23	
Jack Grech	DF	2	0	25 January 1958	Denmark	15 May 1958	Italy U-23	
Charles MacKay	DF	2	0	8 December 1960	Tunisia	18 June 1961	Italy C	
Sunny Anastasi	DF	2	0	18 June 1961	Italy C	5 November 1961	Norway	
Joe Aquilina	DF	2	0	13 February 1966	Libya	27 March 1966	Libya	
Robbie Buttigieg	DF	2	0	13 February 1966	Libya	27 March 1966	Libya	
Salvu Bonnici	DF	2	0	13 February 1966	Libya	27 March 1966	Libya	
Salvu Gatt	DF	2	0	13 February 1966	Libya	27 March 1966	Libya	
Aldrin Muscat	GK	2	0	27 March 1996	Macedonia	14 August 1996	Iceland	
Francis Mifsud	DF	2	0	8 December 1971	Algeria	15 March 1972	Algeria	
Ronnie Schembri	FW	2	0	15 March 1972	Algeria	6 May 1972	Hungary	
Tony Zerafa	DF	2	0	5 March 1977	Tunisia	28 August 1979	Tunisia	
Gennaro Camilleri	DF	2	0	4 March 1978	Tunisia	27 February 1980	West Germany	
Paul Xuereb	MF	2	0	14 June 1981	Liechtenstein	22 June 1981	Thailand	
Pierre Calleja	GK	2	0	10 February 1988	Tunisia	13 February 1988	East Germany	
Ray Sciberras	DF	2	0	10 February 1989	Algeria	12 February 1989	Finland	
Joe Falzon	DF	2	0	7 February 1990	Norway	10 February 1990	South Korea	
Clyde Whitehead	MF	2	0	7 June 1991	Indonesia	9 June 1991	Egypt	
Jesmond Cardona	FW	2	0	8 February 1994	Tunisia	10 February 1994	Georgia	
Alex Busuttil	FW	2	0	16 July 1994	Armenia	19 July 1994	Georgia	
Lino Galea	DF	2	0	19 February 1997	Hungary	6 August 1997	Hungary	
Malcolm Licari	FW	2	0	1 September 2001	Bulgaria	5 September 2001	Czech Republic	
Adrian Pulis	DF	2	0	4 June 2005	Sweden	8 June 2005	Iceland	
Christian Caruana	FW	2	0	10 August 2011	Central African Republic	11 October 2011	Israel	
Edmond Agius	MF	2	0	29 February 2012	Liechtenstein	2 June 2012	Luxembourg	
Justin Grioli	DF	2	0	10 October 2014	Norway	24 March 2016	Moldova	
Matías García	MF	2	0	1 June 2022	Venezuela	7 June 2024	Czech Republic	
Nevin Portelli	FW	2	0	21 March 2024	Slovenia	26 March 2024	Belarus	
Alejandro Garzia	DF	2	0	1 June 2026	Slovakia	5 June 2026	Azerbaijan	
James Sissons	GK	2	0	5 June 2026	Azerbaijan	27 September 2026	Liechtenstein	
George Jones	DF	1	0	24 February 1957	Austria	24 February 1957	Austria	
Ninu Calleja	DF	1	0	24 February 1957	Austria	24 February 1957	Austria	
Alfred Falzon	MF	1	0	8 March 1959	Tunisia	8 March 1959	Tunisia	
Alfred Vella-James	DF	1	0	8 March 1959	Tunisia	8 March 1959	Tunisia	
Eddie Mizzi	FW	1	0	8 March 1959	Tunisia	8 March 1959	Tunisia	
Maurice Walsh	FW	1	0	8 March 1959	Tunisia	8 March 1959	Tunisia	
John Darmanin	DF	1	0	8 December 1960	Tunisia	8 December 1960	Tunisia	
Paul Carbonaro	DF	1	0	18 June 1961	Italy C	18 June 1961	Italy C	
Billy Dalli	FW	1	0	5 November 1961	Norway	5 November 1961	Norway	
Charles Benetti	FW	1	0	3 July 1962	Norway	3 July 1962	Norway	
Emanuel Attard	DF	1	0	8 December 1962	Denmark	8 December 1962	Denmark	
Charles Williams	MF	1	0	8 March 1964	Italy C	8 March 1964	Italy C	
Francis Bonnici	FW	1	0	8 March 1964	Italy C	8 March 1964	Italy C	
Żarenu Alamango	MF	1	0	8 March 1964	Italy C	8 March 1964	Italy C	
Vincent Vassallo	FW	1	0	13 February 1966	Libya	13 February 1966	Libya	
Tony Calleja	FW	1	0	27 April 1969	Austria	27 April 1969	Austria	
Salvu Bonello	FW	1	0	28 September 1973	Canada	28 September 1973	Canada	
Tony Ciantar	DF	1	0	4 September 1974	Libya	4 September 1974	Libya	
Mario Loporto	FW	1	0	28 February 1976	West Germany	28 February 1976	West Germany	
Frank Grima	GK	1	0	4 February 1978	Tunisia	4 February 1978	Tunisia	
Lawrence Borg	GK	1	0	4 February 1978	Tunisia	4 February 1978	Tunisia	
Mario Monreal	FW	1	0	4 February 1978	Tunisia	4 February 1978	Tunisia	
Alan Zammit	GK	1	0	14 May 1978	Libya	14 May 1978	Libya	
Charles Cassar	MF	1	0	14 May 1978	Libya	14 May 1978	Libya	
Joseph Agius Cortis	GK	1	0	14 May 1978	Libya	14 May 1978	Libya	
Julian Holland	DF	1	0	14 May 1978	Libya	14 May 1978	Libya	
Mario Mangion	FW	1	0	14 May 1978	Libya	14 May 1978	Libya	
Raymond Gauci	DF	1	0	14 May 1978	Libya	14 May 1978	Libya	
Joe Curmi	MF	1	0	7 December 1980	Poland	7 December 1980	Poland	
Paul Portelli	DF	1	0	18 June 1981	Indonesia	18 June 1981	Indonesia	
John Camilleri	FW	1	0	24 October 1981	Tunisia	24 October 1981	Tunisia	
Mario Zahra	FW	1	0	9 October 1983	Libya	9 October 1983	Libya	
Paul Grech	FW	1	0	9 October 1983	Libya	9 October 1983	Libya	
Stephen Theuma	DF	1	0	23 May 1984	Sweden	23 May 1984	Sweden	
William Mackay	DF	1	0	6 December 1986	Italy	6 December 1986	Italy	
John Caruana	DF	1	0	21 May 1988	Northern Ireland	21 May 1988	Northern Ireland	
Emanuel Lowell	MF	1	0	1 June 1988	Wales	1 June 1988	Wales	
Leo Refalo	FW	1	0	1 June 1988	Wales	1 June 1988	Wales	
Pierre Aquilina	DF	1	0	3 June 1998	Wales	3 June 1998	Wales	
Mark Psaila	FW	1	0	10 February 1989	Algeria	10 February 1989	Algeria	
Jesmond Ciantar	FW	1	0	11 January 1989	Israel	11 January 1989	Israel	
Oscar Magri	FW	1	0	25 October 1989	East Germany	25 October 1989	East Germany	
Charles Sciberras	MF	1	0	22 February 1995	Luxembourg	22 February 1995	Luxembourg	
Nigel Zerafa	MF	1	0	16 August 1995	Albania	16 August 1995	Albania	
Karl Bonnici	DF	1	0	22 September 1996	Slovakia	22 September 1996	Slovakia	
Kevin Farrugia	MF	1	0	6 August 1997	Hungary	6 August 1997	Hungary	
Reuben Gauci	GK	1	0	8 June 2005	Iceland	8 June 2005	Iceland	
Dyson Falzon	MF	1	0	15 August 2006	Slovakia	15 August 2006	Slovakia	
Jean Pierre Mifsud Triganza	FW	1	0	19 November 2008	Iceland	19 November 2008	Iceland	
Ayrton Azzopardi	MF	1	0	12 October 2012	Czech Republic	12 October 2012	Czech Republic	
Jacob Borg	DF	1	0	14 August 2013	Azerbaijan	14 August 2013	Azerbaijan	
Emanuel Briffa	DF	1	0	11 November 2015	Jordan	11 November 2015	Jordan	
Owen Bugeja	DF	1	0	11 November 2015	Jordan	11 November 2015	Jordan	
Dale Camilleri	DF	1	0	6 June 2017	Ukraine	6 June 2017	Ukraine	
Johann Bezzina	MF	1	0	6 June 2017	Ukraine	6 June 2017	Ukraine	
Michael Johnson	DF	1	0	26 March 2018	Finland	26 March 2018	Finland	
Jurgen Pisani	DF	1	0	15 November 2019	Spain	15 November 2019	Spain	
Samir Arab	DF	1	0	7 October 2020	Gibraltar	7 October 2020	Gibraltar	
Joe Muscatt	MF	1	0	7 October 2020	Gibraltar	7 October 2020	Gibraltar	
Neil Tabone	MF	1	0	11 November 2020	Liechtenstein	11 November 2020	Liechtenstein	
Dexter Xuereb	DF	1	0	30 May 2021	Northern Ireland	30 May 2021	Northern Ireland	
Mattia Veselji	FW	1	0	1 June 2022	Venezuela	1 June 2022	Venezuela	
Matthew Grech	GK	1	0	19 June 2023	Ukraine	19 June 2023	Ukraine	
Neil Micallef	DF	1	0	14 November 2024	Liechtenstein	14 November 2024	Liechtenstein	

== References and notes ==
=== Additional references ===
- Strack-Zimmermann, Benjamin. "Malta (2018)". National-Football-Teams.com.
- Mamrud, Roberto. "Malta - Record International Players". Rec.Sport.Soccer Statistics Foundation.
