= Lolly Borg =

Maltese footballer and manager (1931–2020)

Lolli Borg
Personal information
- Full name: Emmanuel "Lolli" Borg
- Date of birth: 23 October 1931
- Place of birth: Malta
- Date of death: 10 October 2020 (aged 88)
- Place of death: Malta
- Position: Forward

Senior career*
Years	Team	Apps	(Gls)
1947–1963	Floriana	220	(105)

International career
1957–1962	Malta	8	(1)

Managerial career
- 1968–1973: Floriana
- Rabat Ajax
- Senglea Athletic
- San Ġwann
- * Club domestic league appearances and goals

Emmanuel Borg, better known as Lolly Borg (23 October 1931 – 10 October 2020), was a Maltese football player and manager.

He was the cousin of Lolly Debattista, another famous Maltese player, and he is currently regarded as one of the most representative players of Maltese football, as a one-club man he spent his whole career playing as a forward for Floriana.

== Career ==
=== Player ===
==== Club ====
Borg made his debut on 1947, when he was just 16, coming from Floriana Ajax, a youth team that was annexed by Floriana. He spent his whole career as a player in the club, leading the team to 7 Premier League titles and 8 Maltese FA Trophies from 1947 to 1963.

He also received the Maltese Player of the Year award in 1962, and was top-scorer of the Maltese League twice (1952 and 1955).

==== International ====
Borg played eight times for the Maltese national football team, including the first ever match against Austria played on 24 February 1957, that was also his first international match. His first and only goal, with the national team was scored in a friendly against Tunisia on December 8, 1960.

=== Manager ===
After his retirement in 1967, Borg was hired as Floriana coach in 1968 and led the team to the victory of two Premier League titles (1969–70 and 1972–73) and one FA Trophy (1971–72) before stepping down in 1973. He later had short spells with Rabat Ajax, Senglea Athletic and San Ġwann.

== Career statistics ==
=== International ===
Malta national team
Year	Apps	Goals
1957	1	0
1958	1	0
1960	1	1
1961	2	0
1962	3	0
Total	8	1

== Honours ==
=== Player ===
Floriana

- Maltese Premier League: 1949–50, 1950–51, 1951–52, 1952–53, 1954–55, 1957–58, 1961–62
- Maltese FA Trophy: 1948–49, 1949–50, 1952–53, 1953–54, 1954–55, 1956–57, 1957–58, 1960-61

Individual

- Maltese Player of the Year: 1961–62
- Maltese Premier League top-scorer: 1951-52, 1954-55

=== Manager ===
Floriana

- Maltese Premier League: 1969–70, 1972–73
- Maltese FA Trophy: 1971–72
