= Lolly Debattista =

Maltese footballer (1929–2021)

Personal information
- Full name: Emmanuel Debattista
- Date of birth: 21 December 1929
- Place of birth: Floriana, Malta
- Date of death: 2 May 2021 (aged 91)
- Position: Defender

Senior career*
Years	Team	Apps	(Gls)
1947–1966	Floriana	211	(0)

International career
1957–1962	Malta	3	(0)

Managerial career
- 1975–1976: Ħamrun Spartans
- 1976–1979: Valletta
- 1990–1993: Ħamrun Spartans
- 1993–1994: Senglea Athletic
- * Club domestic league appearances and goals

Emmanuel Debattista (21 December 1929 – 2 May 2021), better known as Lolly Debattista, was a Maltese football player and manager. A one-club man, he spent his whole career playing as a defender for Floriana.Lolly Debattista is also the grandfather of the popular Maltese & International Platinum Awarded Artist Kevin Borg.

== Playing career ==
=== Club ===
Debattista began his career with Floriana Ajax, a youth team that was annexed in the 1948–49 season by Floriana. After the juniors won two prestigious victories against arch-rivals Sliema Wanderers (including a 5–0 victory), some were promoted permanently to the senior team.

Debattista played for Floriana for his entire playing career, which ended in 1967. During his career, the Evergreens won the Maltese Premier League seven times and the Maltese FA Trophy nine times.

=== International ===
Debattista played three times for the Maltese national football team, including the first ever match against Austria played on 24 February 1957. His first international match was the European Championship qualifier against Denmark, which Malta lost 6–1.

== Managerial career ==
Debattista began coaching at youth level for Floriana, and later was assistant coach of the first team under the leadership of his cousin Lolly Borg, in the 1961–62 season. In 1975, Debattista became head coach of the Ħamrun Spartans, with whom in his first season they gained promotion to the Maltese Premier League. In December 1976, he was hired by Valletta, where he reached the cup finals twice in a row, defeating his old club Floriana on both occasions. He also won the league title for the 1977–78 season.

From 1991 to 1993 he had a second spell at the helm of Ħamrun Spartans, which he led to win a Maltese FA Trophy in 1991–92 and a Maltese Super Cup in 1991. In 1994 after an unsuccessful spell with Senglea Athletic he decided to retire as a manager.

== Career statistics ==
Appearances and goals by national team and year
National team	Year	Apps	Goals
Malta	1957	1	0
Malta	1962	2	0
Total		3	0

== Honours ==
=== As a player ===
Floriana

- Maltese Premier League: 1949–50, 1950–51, 1951–52, 1952–53, 1954–55, 1957–58, 1961–62
- Maltese FA Trophy: 1949–50, 1952–53, 1953–54, 1954–55, 1956–57, 1957–58, 1960–61, 1965–66, 1966–67

Individual

- Maltese Player of the Year: 1954–55

=== As a manager ===
Ħamrun Spartans

- Maltese FA Trophy: 1991–92
