= 1974 FIFA World Cup qualification (UEFA) =

Tournament details
- Teams: 32 (from 1 confederation)

Tournament statistics
- Top scorer(s): (Bulgaria) Hristo Bonev (7 goals) (Netherlands) Johan Cruyff (7 goals) (Italy) Gigi Riva (7 goals) (East Germany) Joachim Streich (7 goals)

Listed below are the dates and results for the 1974 FIFA World Cup qualification rounds for the European zone (UEFA). For an overview of the qualification rounds, see the article 1974 FIFA World Cup qualification.

A total of 32 UEFA teams entered the competition. The European zone was allocated 9.5 places (out of 16) in the final tournament. West Germany, the hosts, qualified automatically, leaving 8.5 spots open for competition between 32 teams.

The 32 teams were divided into 9 groups of 3 or 4 teams each (four groups with 3 teams and five groups with 4 teams). The teams would play against each other on a home-and-away basis. The group winners would qualify, except the winner of Group 9, which would advance to the UEFA / CONMEBOL Intercontinental Play-off.

== Draw ==
The draw for the qualifying groups took place in Düsseldorf on 17 July 1971. During the draw procedure, entrants were drawn into the 9 qualifying groups from the four pots of seeds.

Pot A	Pot B	Pot C	Pot D
Italy; England; Czechoslovakia; Belgium; Romania; Soviet Union; Sweden; Bulgaria; Yugoslavia	Portugal; Spain; France; East Germany; Denmark; Poland; Switzerland; Netherlands; Hungary	Northern Ireland; Austria; Turkey; Republic of Ireland; Wales; Norway; Scotland; Greece; Albania	Finland; Luxembourg; Malta; Iceland; Cyprus

== Groups ==
=== Group 1 ===
Rank	Team	Pld	W	D	L	GF	GA	GD	Pts
1=	Austria	6	3	2	1	14	7	+7	8
1=	Sweden	6	3	2	1	15	8	+7	8
3	Hungary	6	2	4	0	12	7	+5	8
4	Malta	6	0	0	6	1	20	−19	0

Austria and Sweden finished level on points and goal difference, and a play-off on neutral ground was played to decide who would qualify. Sweden won to qualify for the World Cup.

=== Group 2 ===
Rank	Team	Pld	W	D	L	GF	GA	GD	Pts
1	Italy	6	4	2	0	12	0	+12	10
2	Turkey	6	2	2	2	5	3	+2	6
3	Switzerland	6	2	2	2	2	4	−2	6
4	Luxembourg	6	1	0	5	2	14	−12	2

=== Group 3 ===
Rank	Team	Pld	W	D	L	GF	GA	GD	Pts
1	Netherlands	6	4	2	0	24	2	+22	10
2	Belgium	6	4	2	0	12	0	+12	10
3	Norway	6	2	0	4	9	16	−7	4
4	Iceland	6	0	0	6	2	29	−27	0

=== Group 4 ===
Rank	Team	Pld	W	D	L	GF	GA	GD	Pts
1	East Germany	6	5	0	1	18	3	+15	10
2	Romania	6	4	1	1	17	4	+13	9
3	Finland	6	1	1	4	3	21	−18	3
4	Albania	6	1	0	5	3	13	−10	2

=== Group 5 ===
Rank	Team	Pld	W	D	L	GF	GA	GD	Pts
1	Poland	4	2	1	1	6	3	+3	5
2	England	4	1	2	1	3	4	−1	4
3	Wales	4	1	1	2	3	5	−2	3

=== Group 6 ===
Rank	Team	Pld	W	D	L	GF	GA	GD	Pts
1	Bulgaria	6	4	2	0	13	3	+10	10
2	Portugal	6	2	3	1	10	6	+4	7
3	Northern Ireland	6	1	3	2	5	6	−1	5
4	Cyprus	6	1	0	5	1	14	−13	2

=== Group 7 ===
Rank	Team	Pld	W	D	L	GF	GA	GD	Pts
1=	Spain	4	2	2	0	8	5	+3	6
1=	Yugoslavia	4	2	2	0	7	4	+3	6
3	Greece	4	0	0	4	5	11	−6	0

Spain and Yugoslavia finished level on points and goal difference, and a play-off on neutral ground was played to decide who would qualify. Yugoslavia won to qualify for the World Cup.

=== Group 8 ===
Rank	Team	Pld	W	D	L	GF	GA	GD	Pts
1	Scotland	4	3	0	1	8	3	+5	6
2	Czechoslovakia	4	2	1	1	9	3	+6	5
3	Denmark	4	0	1	3	2	13	−11	1

=== Group 9 ===
Rank	Team	Pld	W	D	L	GF	GA	GD	Pts
1	Soviet Union	4	3	0	1	5	2	+3	6
2	Republic of Ireland	4	1	1	2	4	5	−1	3
3	France	4	1	1	2	3	5	−2	3

The Soviet Union advanced to the UEFA–CONMEBOL play-off.

== Inter-confederation play-offs ==
Team 1	Agg.	Team 2	1st leg	2nd leg
Soviet Union	w.o. (Note: The Soviet Union refused to play in Chile for the second leg, so Chile were awarded a 2–0 walkover victory.)	Chile	0–0	0–2

== Goalscorers ==
7 goals

- (Bulgaria) Hristo Bonev
- (East Germany) Joachim Streich
- (Italy) Gigi Riva
- (Netherlands) Johan Cruyff

5 goals

- (Netherlands) Willy Brokamp
- (Romania) Florea Dumitrache
- (Sweden) Roland Sandberg

4 goals

- (Belgium) Raoul Lambert
- (East Germany) Jürgen Sparwasser
- (Netherlands) Johan Neeskens
- (Sweden) Ralf Edström
- (Sweden) Bo Larsson

3 goals

- (Austria) Josef Hickersberger
- (Austria) Kurt Jara
- (Bulgaria) Georgi Denev
- (Czechoslovakia) Zdeněk Nehoda
- (Czechoslovakia) Bohumil Veselý
- (Hungary) Ferenc Bene
- (Norway) Tor Egil Johansen
- (Socialist Federal Republic of Yugoslavia) Dušan Bajević

2 goals

- (Austria) August Starek
- (Belgium) Léon Dolmans
- (Belgium) Odilon Polleunis
- (Bulgaria) Bozhil Kolev
- (East Germany) Bernd Bransch
- (East Germany) Hans-Jürgen Kreische
- (East Germany) Wolfram Löwe
- (Hungary) Lajos Kocsis
- (Hungary) Sándor Zámbó
- (Republic of Ireland) Terry Conroy
- (Italy) Gianni Rivera
- (Netherlands) Willem van Hanegem
- (Northern Ireland) Trevor Anderson
- (Norway) Harry Hestad
- (Poland) Jan Domarski
- (Poland) Robert Gadocha
- (Portugal) Rui Jordão
- (Portugal) Nené
- (Romania) Ion Dumitru
- (Romania) Dumitru Marcu
- (Romania) Mircea Sandu
- (Soviet Union) Volodymyr Onyshchenko
- (Spain) José Claramunt
- (Spain) Rubén Óscar Valdez
- (Sweden) Ove Kindvall
- (Turkey) Osman Arpacıoğlu
- (Socialist Federal Republic of Yugoslavia) Stanislav Karasi

1 goal

- (Albania) Sabah Bizi
- (Albania) Mihal Gjika
- (Albania) Ramazan Rragami
- (Austria) Franz Hasil
- (Austria) Roland Hattenberger
- (Austria) Norbert Hof
- (Austria) Helmut Köglberger
- (Austria) Thomas Parits
- (Austria) Peter Pumm
- (Belgium) Jean Dockx
- (Belgium) Paul Van Himst
- (Belgium) Frans Janssens
- (Bulgaria) Atanas Mihaylov
- (Cyprus) Kokos Antoniou
- (Czechoslovakia) Přemysl Bičovský
- (Czechoslovakia) Vladimír Hagara
- (Czechoslovakia) Ladislav Petráš
- (Denmark) Ole Bjørnmose
- (Denmark) Finn Laudrup
- (East Germany) Peter Ducke
- (England) Colin Bell
- (England) Allan Clarke
- (England) Norman Hunter
- (Finland) Jarmo Manninen
- (Finland) Olavi Rissanen
- (Finland) Miikka Toivola
- (France) Georges Bereta
- (France) Serge Chiesa
- (France) Jean-Michel Larqué
- (Greece) Antonis Antoniadis
- (Greece) Mimis Domazos
- (Greece) Kostas Eleftherakis
- (Greece) Giorgos Koudas
- (Hungary) László Bálint
- (Hungary) Antal Dunai
- (Hungary) István Juhász
- (Hungary) Mihály Kozma
- (Hungary) Csaba Vidáts
- (Iceland) Elmar Geirsson
- (Iceland) Örn Óskarsson
- (Republic of Ireland) Mick Martin
- (Republic of Ireland) Ray Treacy
- (Italy) Pietro Anastasi
- (Italy) Fabio Capello
- (Italy) Giorgio Chinaglia
- (Luxembourg) Nico Braun
- (Luxembourg) Gilbert Dussier
- (Malta) Anton Camilleri
- (Netherlands) Arie Haan
- (Netherlands) Barry Hullshoff
- (Netherlands) Theo de Jong
- (Netherlands) Piet Keizer
- (Netherlands) René van de Kerkhof
- (Netherlands) Dick Schneider
- (Northern Ireland) Sammy Morgan
- (Northern Ireland) Liam O'Kane
- (Northern Ireland) Martin O'Neill
- (Norway) Jan Fuglset
- (Norway) Tom Lund
- (Norway) Per Pettersen
- (Norway) Harald Sunde
- (Poland) Grzegorz Lato
- (Poland) Włodzimierz Lubański
- (Portugal) Humberto Coelho
- (Portugal) Eusébio
- (Portugal) Chico Faria
- (Portugal) Artur Jorge
- (Portugal) Alfredo Quaresma
- (Portugal) António Simões
- (Romania) Emerich Dembrovschi
- (Romania) Nicolae Dobrin
- (Romania) Dudu Georgescu
- (Romania) Radu Nunweiller
- (Romania) Nicolae Pantea
- (Romania) Teodor Tarălungă
- (Scotland) Jimmy Bone
- (Scotland) Kenny Dalglish
- (Scotland) Joe Harper
- (Scotland) Jim Holton
- (Scotland) Joe Jordan
- (Scotland) Peter Lorimer
- (Scotland) Lou Macari
- (Scotland) Willie Morgan
- (Soviet Union) Oleh Blokhin
- (Soviet Union) Vladimir Fedotov
- (Soviet Union) Viktor Kolotov
- (Spain) Amancio Amaro
- (Spain) Juan Manuel Asensi
- (Spain) Roberto Juan Martínez
- (Spain) Juan Cruz Sol
- (Sweden) Ove Grahn
- (Sweden) Dag Szepanski
- (Switzerland) Rolf Blättler
- (Switzerland) Karl Odermatt
- (Turkey) Köksal Mesçi
- (Turkey) Mehmet Türkkan
- (Turkey) Melih Atacan
- (Wales) Trevor Hockey
- (Wales) Leighton James
- (Wales) John Toshack
- (Socialist Federal Republic of Yugoslavia) Jovan Aćimović
- (Socialist Federal Republic of Yugoslavia) Josip Katalinski
- (Socialist Federal Republic of Yugoslavia) Ivica Šurjak

1 own goal

- (Iceland) Einar Gunnarsson (playing against Belgium)
- (Malta) Charles Spiteri (playing against Austria)
- (Socialist Federal Republic of Yugoslavia) Josip Katalinski (playing against Greece)
