= 1974 FIFA World Cup qualification – UEFA Group 1 =

Group 1 consisted of four of the 32 teams entered into the European zone: Austria, Hungary, Malta, and Sweden. These four teams competed on a home-and-away basis for one of the 9,5 spots in the final tournament allocated to the European zone, with the group's winner claiming this spot.

== Standings ==
Rank	Team	Pld	W	D	L	GF	GA	GD	Pts
1=	Austria	6	3	2	1	14	7	+7	8
1=	Sweden	6	3	2	1	15	8	+7	8
3	Hungary	6	2	4	0	12	7	+5	8
4	Malta	6	0	0	6	1	20	−19	0

== Matches ==
14 November 1971

Malta	0–2	Hungary
		Bene 3', 56'

The Stadium, Valletta, Malta
Attendance: 9,231
Referee: Lo Bello (Italy)

30 April 1972

Austria	4–0	Malta
Hickersberger 29', 34', 36'; Hof 85'

Praterstadion, Vienna, Austria
Attendance: 16,081
Referee: Kruashvili (Soviet Union)

6 May 1972

Hungary	3–0	Malta
Kocsis 35'; Bene 60'; I. Juhász 75'

Megyeri úti Stadion, Budapest, Hungary
Attendance: 5,646
Referee: Gugulović (Yugoslavia)

25 May 1972

Sweden	0–0	Hungary

Råsunda Fotbollstadion, Stockholm, Sweden
Attendance: 28,598
Referee: Van Ravens (Netherlands)

10 June 1972

Austria	2–0	Sweden
Parits 65'; Pumm 78'

Praterstadion, Vienna, Austria
Attendance: 40,578
Referee: Anton Bucheli (Switzerland)

15 October 1972

Austria	2–2	Hungary
Hasil 58' (pen.); Jara 71'		Dunai II 16'; Kocsis 20'

Praterstadion, Vienna, Austria
Attendance: 67,392
Referee: Glöckner (East Germany)

15 October 1972

Sweden	7–0	Malta
Edström 2', 32', 64'; Larsson 18', 35' (pen.); Sandberg 44'; Szepanski 57' (pen.)

Ullevi Stadion, Gothenburg, Sweden
Attendance: 24,277
Referee: Hirviniemi (Finland)

25 November 1972

Malta	0–2	Austria
		Köglberger 48'; Spiteri 77' (o.g.)

The Stadium, Valletta, Malta
Attendance: 4,373
Referee: Francescon (Italy)

29 April 1973

Hungary	2–2	Austria
Zámbó 12'; Bálint 69'		Starek 14'; Jara 28'

Népstadion, Budapest, Hungary
Attendance: 72,068
Referee: Kitabdjian (France)

23 May 1973

Sweden	3–2	Austria
Sandberg 24', 78'; Grahn 52'		Jara 50'; Starek 89'

Ullevi Stadion, Gothenburg, Sweden
Attendance: 48,462
Referee: Loraux (Belgium)

13 June 1973

Hungary	3–3	Sweden
Kozma 9'; Vidáts 59'; Zámbó 71'		Kindvall 38'; Sandberg 57'; Edström 77'

Népstadion, Budapest, Hungary
Attendance: 73,070
Referee: Lo Bello (Italy)

11 November 1973

Malta	1–2	Sweden
Camilleri 20'		Kindvall 21'; Larsson 35' (pen.)

The Stadium, Valletta, Malta
Attendance: 15,459
Referee: Katsoras (Greece)

Austria and Sweden finished level on points and goal difference, and a play-off on neutral ground was played to decide who would qualify.

27 November 1973

Sweden	2–1	Austria
Sandberg 12'; Larsson 28' (pen.)		Hattenberger 39'

Parkstadion, Gelsenkirchen, West Germany
Attendance: 69,974
Referee: Glöckner (East Germany)
