= Frankie Micallef =

Maltese footballer

Personal information
- Date of birth: 16 September 1945 (age 81)
- Place of birth: Floriana, Crown Colony of Malta
- Position: Midfielder

Senior career*
Years	Team	Apps	(Gls)
1964-1981	Floriana	206	(19)

International career
1969–1977	Malta	8	(0)
- * Club domestic league appearances and goals

Frankie Micallef (born 3 September 1945) is a Maltese retired international footballer who played for Floriana, as a midfielder.

== Career ==
Micallef played his entire career for hometown club Floriana, making his league debut on 18 April 1964 against St. George's.

He made his international debut for Malta in an April 1969 friendly match against Austria and earned a total of 8 caps (no goals). His final international was an October 1977 World Cup qualification match away against East Germany.

== Honours ==
- Maltese Premier League: 5

1968, 1970, 1973, 1975, 1977

- FA Trophy: 3

1967, 1972, 1976
