= 1974 FIFA World Cup qualification – UEFA Group 6 =

Group 6 consisted of four of the 32 teams entered into the European zone: Bulgaria, Cyprus, Northern Ireland, and Portugal. These four teams competed on a home-and-away basis for one of the 9 spots in the final tournament allocated to the European zone, with the group's winner claiming the place in the finals.

== Standings ==
Rank	Team	Pld	W	D	L	GF	GA	GD	Pts
1	Bulgaria	6	4	2	0	13	3	+10	10
2	Portugal	6	2	3	1	10	6	+4	7
3	Northern Ireland	6	1	3	2	5	6	−1	5
4	Cyprus	6	1	0	5	1	14	−13	2

== Matches ==
29 March 1972

Portugal	4–0	Cyprus
Humberto Coelho 7'; Nené 17'; Artur Jorge 46'; Rui Jordão 81'	Report

Lisbon, Portugal
Referee: Loraux (Belgium)

10 May 1972

Cyprus	0–1	Portugal
	Report	Chico Faria 36'

Nicosia, Cyprus
Referee: Chevorc (Romania)

18 October 1972

Bulgaria	3–0	Northern Ireland
Bonev 18' (pen.), 85' (pen.); Kolev 53'	Report

Sofia, Bulgaria
Referee: Schulenburg (West Germany)

19 November 1972

Cyprus	0–4	Bulgaria
	Report	Mihaylov 2'; Denev 15'; Bonev 17', 80'

Limassol, Cyprus
Referee: Lo Bello (Italy)

14 February 1973

Cyprus	1–0	Northern Ireland
Antoniou 88'	Report

Nicosia, Cyprus
Referee: Bentu (Romania)

28 March 1973

Northern Ireland	1–1	Portugal
O'Neill 18'	Report	Eusébio 84' (pen.)

Coventry, England
Referee: Schiller (Austria)

2 May 1973

Bulgaria	2–1	Portugal
Denev 38'; Bonev 60'	Report	Nené 74'

Sofia, Bulgaria
Referee: Gugulović (Yugoslavia)

8 May 1973

Northern Ireland	3–0	Cyprus
Morgan 4'; Anderson 32', 44'	Report

London, England
Referee: Jones (Wales)

26 September 1973

Northern Ireland	0–0	Bulgaria
	Report

Sheffield, England
Referee: Nyhus (Norway)

13 October 1973

Portugal	2–2	Bulgaria
Quaresma 48'; Simões 89'	Report	Bonev 56', 65'

Lisbon, Portugal
Referee: Taylor (England)

14 November 1973

Portugal	1–1	Northern Ireland
Rui Jordão 34'	Report	O'Kane 68'

Lisbon, Portugal
Referee: Ibanez (Spain)

18 November 1973

Bulgaria	2–0	Cyprus
Kolev 2'; Denev 65'	Report

Sofia, Bulgaria
Referee: Placek (Czechoslovakia)
