= Quaresma =

Quaresma may refer to:

- the Portuguese name for Lent in the Christian calendar
- Alfredo Quaresma, (born 1944), Portuguese footballer
- Artur Quaresma, (1917–2011), Portuguese footballer
- Ediglê Quaresma Farias, (born 1978), Brazilian footballer
- Eduardo Quaresma (born 2002), Portuguese footballers
- Mateus Quaresma (born 1995), Brazilian footballer
- Ricardo Quaresma, (born 1983), Portuguese footballer
- Virgínia Quaresma (1882-1973), Portuguese journalist
- Quaresma, a film that won a Portuguese Golden Globe in 2004
