= Dag Szepanski =

Swedish footballer (born 1943)

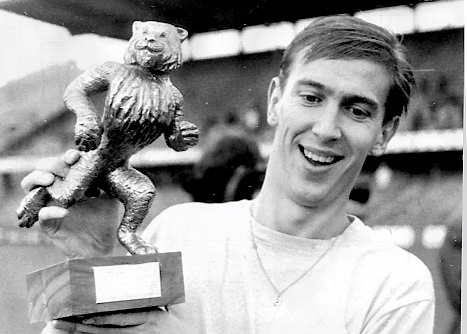
- Szepanski in 1967

Personal information
- Full name: Dag Christer Olaf Szepanski
- Date of birth: 25 December 1943 (age 82)
- Place of birth: Bromölla, Sweden
- Positions: Midfielder; striker

Youth career
- 1950–1961: Bromölla IF

Senior career*
Years	Team	Apps	(Gls)
1961–1966	Bromölla IF		
1967–1969	Malmö FF	50	(32)
1970–1973	AIK	91	(31)
1974–1975	Jönköpings Södra		
1976–1977	IF Väster		

International career
1972	Sweden	1	(1)
- * Club domestic league appearances and goals

Dag Christer Olaf Szepanski (born 25 December 1943) is a Swedish former footballer who played as a midfielder and striker. He was the 1967 Allsvenskan top scorer with Malmö FF and helped the club win both the 1967 Allsvenskan and 1967 Svenska Cupen titles. He made his only international appearance for the Sweden national team in 1972, scoring one goal in a 1974 FIFA World Cup qualifier against Malta.

== Club career ==
Szepanski started his career with IFÖ Bromölla IF before signing with Malmö FF in 1967. During his debut season at Malmö, he was the 1967 Allsvenskan top scorer with 22 goals as Malmö was crowned Swedish champions. He also helped Malmö win the 1967 Svenska Cupen during the same season. In 1970 he signed for AIK, where he spent four seasons and was retrained to play as a midfielder. He finished off his career playing for Jönköping Södra and IF Väster.

== International career ==
Szepanski made his first and only international appearance for the Sweden national team on 15 October 1972 in a 1974 FIFA World Cup qualifier against Malta. Szepanski scored a goal from the penalty spot in a 7–0 win.

== Personal life ==
Szepanski is of Polish descent. His grandparents had emigrated from Kraków to Bromölla.

== Career statistics ==
Appearances and goals by national team and year
National team	Year	Apps	Goals
Sweden	1972	1	1
Total		1	1

Scores and results list Sweden's goal tally first, score column indicates score after each Szepanski goal.

List of international goals scored by Dag Szepanski
No.	Date	Venue	Opponent	Score	Result	Competition	Ref.
1	15 October 1972	Ullevi, Gothenburg, Sweden	Malta	6–0	7–0	1974 FIFA World Cup qualifier	

== Honours ==
Malmö FF

- Allsvenskan: 1967
- Svenska Cupen: 1967

Individual

- Allsvenskan top scorer: 1967
