= 1967 Allsvenskan =

43rd season of Allsvenskan

Allsvenskan
- Season: 1967
- Champions: Malmö FF
- Relegated: Hammarby IF; IFK Holmsund
- European Cup: Malmö FF
- Top goalscorer: Dag Szepanski, Malmö FF (22)
- Average attendance: 9,292

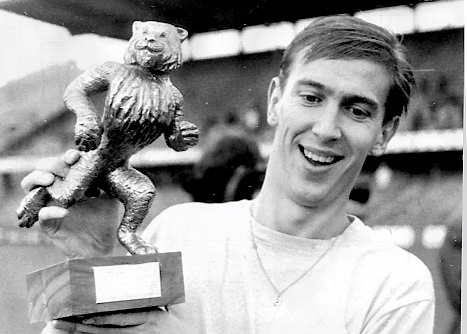
Dag Szepanski (Malmö FF) - the season's top scorer

Statistics of Allsvenskan in season 1967.

== Overview ==
The league was contested by 12 teams, with Malmö FF winning the championship.

== League table ==
Pos	Team	Pld	W	D	L	GF	GA	GD	Pts	Qualification or relegation
1	Malmö FF (C)	22	14	5	3	53	21	+32	33	Qualification to European Cup first round
2	Djurgårdens IF	22	10	8	4	40	28	+12	28	
3	Hälsingborgs IF	22	12	2	8	42	35	+7	26	
4	Örebro SK	22	11	4	7	37	30	+7	26	
5	AIK	22	10	5	7	38	33	+5	25	
6	IFK Norrköping	22	10	5	7	26	21	+5	25	Qualification to Cup Winners' Cup first round (Note: IFK Norrköping qualified for the European Cup Winners' Cup as Svenska Cupen runners-up 1967.)
7	IF Elfsborg	22	9	5	8	46	39	+7	23	
8	GAIS	22	10	3	9	32	33	−1	23	
9	IFK Göteborg	22	8	5	9	41	37	+4	21	
10	Örgryte IS	22	6	5	11	40	46	−6	17	
11	Hammarby IF (R)	22	3	4	15	23	40	−17	10	Relegation to Division 2
12	IFK Holmsund (R)	22	3	1	18	24	79	−55	7	Relegation to Division 2

Rules for classification: 1) points; 2) goal difference; 3) number of goals scored.
(C) Champions; (R) Relegated

== Results ==
Home \ Away	AIK	DIF	GAIS	HAIF	HÄIF	IFE	IFKG	IFKH	IFKN	MFF	ÖSK	ÖIS
AIK		0–0	2–0	2–0	3–4	6–1	0–1	6–2	1–0	1–4	1–0	2–0
Djurgårdens IF	1–1		2–0	2–1	2–0	1–5	3–1	4–2	0–0	0–0	2–2	1–1
GAIS	3–3	2–1		1–0	0–0	3–0	1–4	1–1	1–2	1–7	2–0	3–1
Hammarby IF	3–1	2–1	1–0		0–2	0–1	2–2	1–3	1–1	1–1	0–2	3–3
Hälsingborgs IF	0–1	1–4	3–2	2–1		3–2	3–1	4–1	1–2	0–2	1–2	4–1
IF Elfsborg	1–1	1–2	0–2	3–1	4–2		3–0	4–1	1–2	2–3	5–1	4–4
IFK Göteborg	2–3	3–3	1–2	1–0	1–2	1–2		5–0	1–0	4–2	3–3	4–1
IFK Holmsund	0–2	1–7	1–2	2–1	1–4	1–4	1–3		1–0	0–2	0–2	1–3
IFK Norrköping	1–1	0–1	1–0	1–0	1–0	1–1	1–0	6–2		2–2	2–3	2–1
Malmö FF	2–1	3–0	2–1	4–2	1–2	0–0	2–2	8–0	1–0		3–1	3–0
Örebro SK	3–0	2–2	0–1	3–2	1–1	2–0	2–0	3–1	0–1	1–0		1–2
Örgryte IS	5–0	0–1	1–4	2–1	2–3	2–2	1–1	7–2	2–0	0–1	1–3	

Legend: Blue = home team win; Yellow = draw; Red = away team win.

== Attendances ==
#	Club	Average	Highest
1	Malmö FF	13,419	27,573
2	Örgryte IS	11,490	26,752
3	IFK Göteborg	11,396	22,730
4	IFK Norrköping	10,753	16,761
5	AIK	10,245	23,938
6	Hälsingborgs IF	9,950	20,983
7	Djurgårdens IF	9,728	44,130
8	IF Elfsborg	9,481	13,895
9	GAIS	9,297	18,500
10	Hammarby IF	6,342	16,639
11	Örebro SK	6,065	7,861
12	IFK Holmsund	3,372	6,232
