= Joe Grima (footballer) =

Maltese footballer

Personal information
- Full name: Joseph Grima
- Date of birth: 3 January 1943 (age 83)
- Place of birth: Malta
- Position: Defender

Senior career*
Years	Team	Apps	(Gls)
1959–1962	Sliema Wanderers	16	(0)
1962–1972	Floriana	105	(0)
Total		121	(0)

International career
1964	Malta XI	1	(0)
1969-1971	Malta	8	(0)
- * Club domestic league appearances and goals

Joe Gima (born 3 January 1943 in Malta) is a Maltese retired footballer.

== Club career ==
During his career, Grima played the majority of his career for Floriana as a defender.

== International career ==
Grima made his debut for Malta in a March 1964 unofficial friendly match against an Italy XI Serie C selection and earned a total of 9 caps (1 unofficial thus), scoring no goals. His final international was a November 1971 European Championship qualification match against Hungary.

== Honours ==
Floriana

- Maltese Premier League: 1968, 1970
- Maltese FA Trophy: 1966
