= Victor Scerri =

Maltese footballer

Personal information
- Date of birth: 17 July 1929
- Place of birth: Sliema, Malta
- Date of death: 4 August 2019 (aged 90)
- Position: Goalkeeper

Senior career*
Years	Team	Apps	(Gls)
1947–1949	Melita	6	(0)
1951–1960	Sliema Wanderers	54	(0)
1960–1961	Floriana	5	(0)
1961–1962	Sliema Wanderers	3	(0)
Total		68	(0)

International career
1960	Malta	1	(0)
1957–1958	Malta XI	2	(0)

Managerial career
- 1973: Malta
- 1968–1978: Sliema Wanderers
- 1978–1983: Malta
- * Club domestic league appearances and goals

Victor Scerri (17 July 1929 – 4 August 2019) was a Maltese football player and coach.

== Club career ==
Scerri played the majority of his career for hometown club Sliema Wanderers as a goalkeeper.

== International career ==
Scerri made his debut for Malta in his country's first international match against Austria and earned a total of 3 caps (1 official), scoring no goals. His final international was a December 1960 friendly match against Tunisia.

== Managerial career ==
Scerri managed the national team twice and was in charge of Sliema Wanderers, Gżira United and Msida Saint-Joseph.

== Honours ==
Sliema Wanderers

- Maltese Premier League: 1954, 1956, 1957
