= 1974 FIFA World Cup qualification (UEFA–CONMEBOL play-off) =

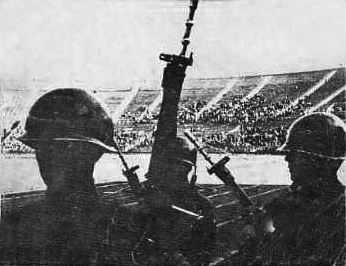
- Soldiers at the Estadio Nacional in September 1973 during its use as a concentration camp
- Event: 1974 FIFA World Cup qualification
Soviet Union	Chile
(Soviet Union)	(Chile)
- Chile won on walkover and qualified for the 1974 FIFA World Cup (Note: The Soviet Union refused to play in Chile for the second leg, so Chile were awarded a 2–0 walkover victory.)

First leg
Soviet Union	Chile
0	0
- Date: 26 September 1973
- Venue: Central Lenin Stadium, Moscow
- Referee: Armando Marques (Brazil)
- Attendance: 48,891

Second leg
Chile	Soviet Union
2	0
- Awarded
- Date: 21 November 1973
- Venue: Estadio Nacional, Santiago
- Referee: Erich Linemayr (Austria)
- Attendance: 15,000

The 1973 play-off for a place in the 1974 FIFA World Cup in West Germany, between the national football teams of the Soviet Union and Chile, is notable for the political circumstances that marked the second leg of the play-off on 21 November 1973. It was scheduled to take place in the Estadio Nacional de Chile in Santiago, the Chilean capital. There had been a coup d'état in Chile two months before, whereupon people deemed undesirable to the new regime of Augusto Pinochet had been held captive and executed in the stadium. The Soviet Union asked FIFA to find a different venue in Chile; when agreement could not be reached, the Soviet team did not take the field and was disqualified from the tournament, giving the Chilean team a victory by walkover. However, the match was still organised by FIFA as normal, but without any away team present. Chile scored in an empty goal to make it 1–0, and then the referee blew to denote the conclusion of the game. Chile advanced to the 1974 World Cup, where they were eliminated in the first round.

== Political circumstances ==
Salvador Allende had been elected to power in Chile in 1970, but was overthrown by Augusto Pinochet in a coup d'état in September 1973, during which thousands of people deemed undesirable by the new regime were taken to the Estadio Nacional in Santiago, tortured and killed; this continued until 7 November. The football match between the Soviet Union and Chile in the same stadium was scheduled for 21 November.

== Prior qualification ==
=== Soviet Union ===
The Soviet's qualification started on 13 October 1972 with a 1–0 loss to France, away in Paris. Five days later they faced the Republic of Ireland in Dublin and won 2–1. Their home matches were played in May 1973. On 13 May they won against the Irish by 1–0, and thirteen days later beat the French 2–0 with both goals coming in the last ten minutes. Rather than having the worst record among group winners, placing Soviet Union in the play-off was simply decided through allocation to Group 9 - Europe (UEFA). Despite 32 UEFA nations participating in the qualifying group stage, UEFA oddly chose to allocate only 3 teams to 4 of the 9 groups, instead of having 8 groups of 4 teams.

=== Chile ===
Chile was placed in Group 3 of the CONMEBOL qualification alongside Peru and Venezuela although the Venezuelans withdrew. On 29 April 1973 Chile was defeated 2–0 by the Peruvians in Lima. In the home game on 13 May 1973 Chile won 2–0, making both teams equal on points and goal difference. A play-off was held on neutral ground in Montevideo, Uruguay, where Chile triumphed 2–1 to face the Soviets by having the worst record among group winners.

== Matches ==
=== First leg ===
1974 FIFA World Cup qualification playoff
26 September 1973
First leg

Soviet Union	0–0	Chile
	Report

Central Lenin Stadium, Moscow
Attendance: 48,891
Referee: Armando Marques (Brazil)

Soviet Union
Chile

GK	1	Yevhen Rudakov
DF	2	Revaz Dzodzuashvili
DF	3	Mykhaylo Fomenko
DF	4	Evgeny Lovchev
DF	5	Vladimir Kaplichny (c)
MF	6	Viktor Kuznetsov
MF	7	Vladimir Muntyan
MF	8	Oleg Dolmatov	(substituted off) 46'
FW	10	Vladimir Onishchenko
FW	9	Arkady Andreasyan	(substituted off) 30'
FW	11	Oleg Blokhin
Substitutes:
FW		Anatoli Kozhemyakin	(substituted on) 30'
FW		Vladimir Gutsaev	(substituted on) 46'
Manager:
(Soviet Union) Yevgeny Goryansky

GK	1	Juan Olivares
DF	2	Juan Machuca
DF	5	Elías Figueroa
DF	3	Alberto Quintano
DF	6	Antonio Arias
MF	12	Francisco Valdés (c)
MF	10	Guillermo Páez
MF	8	Juan Rodríguez
FW	14	Carlos Caszely
FW	16	Sergio Ahumada
FW	22	Leonardo Véliz	(substituted off) 57'
Substitutes:
FW		Julio Crisosto	(substituted on) 57'
Manager:
(Chile) Luis Álamos

After the coup, the new regime had banned all Chileans from leaving the country: in addition due to its anti-communism it did not have a favourable view of the national team playing in the homeland of its staunch enemy. However, at the same time it was desirable to portray an image of normality, so the Pinochet regime let the national team travel on the condition that no one made political statements, since their relatives were under military surveillance. Some of the team members, like Véliz or Caszely, were politically close to the Allende government. In addition, the Soviet Union, an ally of the overthrown government, had condemned the military coup and did not recognise the new government, with which it broke diplomatic relations.

At Moscow airport no Chilean authority received the team. In addition, Elías Figueroa and Carlos Caszely were detained by the immigration authorities for alleged irregularities in their passports. Leonardo Véliz told the Chilean newspaper La Tercera that "In Moscow, I was approached by a Chilean student from Lumumba University, the son of a communist militant. I told him to forget to return to Chile, because any red dye was going to be a danger to his integrity".

The first leg was played in Moscow on 26 September, two weeks after the coup, which brought a political dimension to the match. The Soviet authorities banned the entry of journalists and cameras into the stadium. It was a very tense game that was almost cancelled due to rumours of arrests of Chilean players in exchange for the release of political prisoners. The final result was a goalless draw.

The Soviet government and media were humiliated by the result, hoping for an easy victory on home soil.

=== Second leg ===
1974 FIFA World Cup qualification playoff
21 November 1973
Second leg

Chile	2–0 (w/o)	Soviet Union
Valdés	Report

Estadio Nacional, Santiago
Attendance: 15,000
Referee: Erich Linemayr (Austria)

In the face of criticism of the regime regarding abuses against detainees, the Football Federation of Chile suggested other scenarios, but the military junta, in an effort to improve the climate of opinion, insisted on demonstrating normality and at the same time defeating communism playing on home ground. The Russians demanded to play the game in a neutral country, which both Chile and FIFA rejected.

FIFA established a commission that inspected the National Stadium, which had been prepared for the occasion but which still had about 7,000 detainees. According to testimony of Gregorio Mena Barrales, a politician imprisoned in that stadium, that commission "visited the field, walked around the court, looked with distant eyes at the prisoners and gave the opinion: In the stadium you could play." While the FIFA commission examined the stadium, the detainees were hidden inside. Before the match, the detainees were transferred to a detention site in the Atacama Desert.

But the Soviets never travelled, claiming political and security issues, arguing that the National Stadium was an illegal detention centre where more than 7000 political prisoners were crowded and where many dissidents were tortured after the coup d'état against Salvador Allende. The USSR's decision was supported by several of its allied countries, especially by East Germany which was already qualified and threatened not to appear at the World Cup event. The Soviets sent a letter to FIFA explaining that "For moral considerations, Soviets can not at this time play in the stadium of Santiago, splashed with the blood of the Chilean patriots".

Chile demanded a compensation of $300,000 if the Soviets did not appear, claiming that they could not place the tickets for sale and the cost of preparing the game. FIFA declared the match a 2–0 walkover victory for Chile. However, FIFA arranged for the match to be held anyway. The match was attended by only 15,000 people. The game lasted 30 seconds, which took the Chilean team to score a goal from the kickoff. When they arrived in the area, as they had agreed, it was the captain, Francisco "Chamaco" Valdés, who scored the empty goal.

== Aftermath ==
=== Chile ===
The Chileans were drawn alongside the hosts West Germany and two first-time entrants: East Germany and Australia. In the first game, Chile lost 1–0 to West Germany, the goal being scored by Paul Breitner in the first half. Sergio Ahumada equalised for Chile in the second game to draw against the East Germans, but a 0–0 draw to Australia eliminated Chile from the World Cup. The two German teams advanced.

=== Soviet Union ===
A period of decline started for the Soviets as they also missed out on the 1978 FIFA World Cup and the UEFA European Championships of 1976 and 1980.
