= Aldrin Muscat (footballer) =

Maltese footballer

Personal information
- Date of birth: 11 September 1971 (age 55)
- Place of birth: Malta
- Position: Striker

Senior career*
Years	Team	Apps	(Gls)
1990–1995	Żurrieq	88	(26)
1995–1998	Sliema Wanderers	49	(32)
1998–1999	Gozo	16	(19)
2000–2001	Qormi	8	(1)
2001–2002	Żurrieq		
2002–2003	Msida Saint-Joseph	8	(3)
2003–2005	Dingli Swallows		
Total		169	(81)

International career
1992–1993	Malta U21	4	(0)
1996	Malta	2	(0)
- * Club domestic league appearances and goals

Aldrin Muscat (born 11 September 1971) is a retired footballer, who represented the Malta national team.

== Club career ==
During his career, he most notably played as a striker for Żurrieq and Sliema Wanderers. With Sliema, he became the Maltese Premier League top goalscorer in the 1995-96 season.

== International career ==
Muscat earned two caps for Malta in 1996, both in friendly matches away against Macedonia and Iceland.

== Honours ==
- Maltese Premier League: 1

1996
