= Mario Schembri (Maltese footballer, born 1950) =

Maltese footballer (born 1950)

Personal information
- Date of birth: 30 July 1950 (age 76)
- Place of birth: Malta
- Position: Defender

Senior career*
Years	Team	Apps	(Gls)
1967–1970	Msida St-Joseph	14	(2)
1970–1983	Sliema Wanderers	231	(13)
1983–1987	Żurrieq	28	(1)
Total		173	(16)

International career^{‡}
1976–1983	Malta	24	(0)
- * Club domestic league appearances and goals as of 31 March 2024 ‡ National team caps and goals as of 31 March 2024

Mario Schembri (born 30 July 1950) is a retired footballer, who represented the Malta national team. During the majority career, he played as a defender for Sliema Wanderers.

== International career ==
Schembri made his debut for Malta in a March 1976 friendly match against Libya and earned a total of 14 caps (no goals). His final international was a December 1983 European Championship qualification match away against the Netherlands.

== Honours ==
Sliema Wanderers

- Maltese Premier League: 3

1971, 1972, 1976

- FA Trophy: 2

1974, 1979

Żurrieq

- FA Trophy: 1

1985
