= Hristo Bonev =

Bulgarian footballer

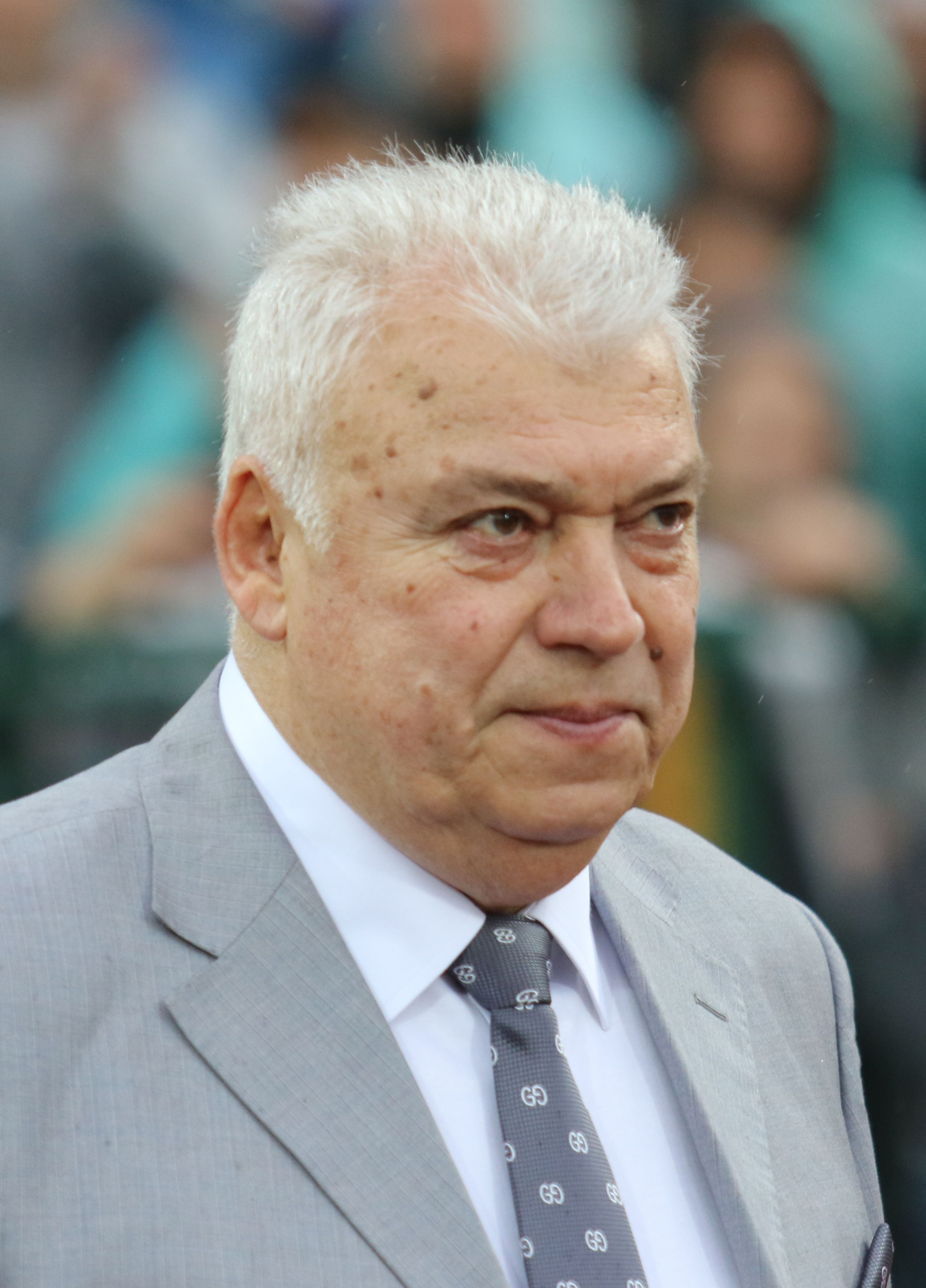
- Bonev in 2016

Personal information
- Date of birth: 3 February 1947 (age 79)
- Place of birth: Plovdiv, Bulgaria
- Height: 1.81 m (5 ft 11 in)
- Position: Attacking midfielder

Senior career*
| Years | Team | Apps | (Gls) |
| 1963–1967 | Lokomotiv Plovdiv | 64 | (19) |
| 1967–1968 | CSKA Sofia | 6 | (5) |
| 1968–1979 | Lokomotiv Plovdiv | 337 | (161) |
| 1979–1982 | AEK Athens | 10 | (0) |
| 1982–1984 | Lokomotiv Plovdiv | 6 | (0) |
| Total | | 422 | (185) |

International career
| 1967–1979 | Bulgaria | 96 | (48) |

Managerial career
- 1983–1985: Lokomotiv Plovdiv
- 1987–1988: Lokomotiv Plovdiv
- 1989–1990: Panathinaikos
- 1990–1993: AEL
- 1994: Ionikos
- 1995–1996: APOEL
- 1996–1998: Bulgaria
- 1997–1998: Lokomotiv Sofia
- 2000–2001: Sachsen Leipzig
- 2010: Lokomotiv Plovdiv
- * Club domestic league appearances and goals

Hristo Atanasov Bonev (Bulgarian: Христо Aтанасов Бонев; born 3 February 1947), also known as Zuma (Bulgarian: Зума), is a Bulgarian football manager and former player who last managed Lokomotiv Plovdiv in the Bulgarian A PFG. One of the greatest Bulgarian men's footballers, Bonev was renowned for his vision and technique.

== Club career ==
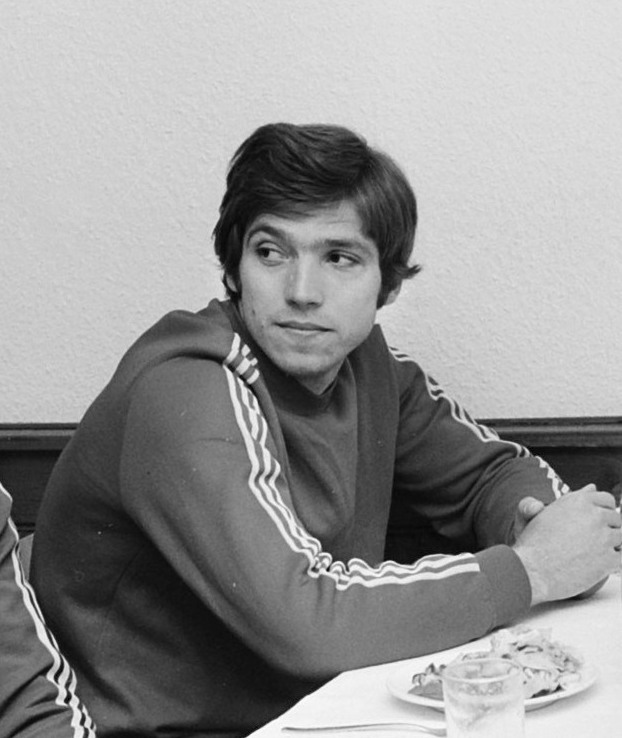
Bonev in 1974

Bonev started his career at Lokomotiv Plovdiv in 1964 where he played until 1980 with a brief spell at CSKA Sofia in 1967. During his spell at Lokomotiv Plovdiv, he became their star player, while also was called to play for the national team.

In October 1980, Bonev moved to Greece and agreed to sign for AEK Athens, in a 1+1 year deal which was effective from July 1981. After the signing of his contract on 15 October, he left Greece and returned in December of the same year to start training with the team. From that period until he formally joined the club's roster, he participated only in friendly matches. Due to his knee injury his offer at AEK was meager, making only 10 appearances throughout the season. In the summer of 1982, AEK did not enable the option of the renewal in his contract and thus Bonev left the club. Furthermore in order to ensure his freedom then, he convinced the president of the club, Andreas Zafiropoulos by proposing as his replacement his compatriot Angel Kolev with a small amount of money.

After AEK he tried his luck in England, where Oxford United offered him a trial but with a better-paying contract option. The experiment in England did not catch on, as Bonev was betrayed by his knee and so he left Oxford with just three appearances in pre-season friendlies.

He returned to Lokomotiv Plovdiv to end his career in 1984 at the age of 37. Bonev has played in 404 games and has scored 180 goals in the A group for Lokomotiv Plovdiv. He has played also 14 games and has scored 6 goals in the UEFA Cup with "The Smurfs" (the nickname of Lokomotiv Plovdiv). Bonev won the Cup of the Soviet Army in 1983, he is also vice-champion of Bulgaria for 1973, with two more bronze medals won - in 1969 and 1974.

== International career ==
Bonev played for the Bulgaria national team 96 times, scoring a record 48 goals, between 1967 and 1979. He played for his country at the 1970 and 1974 World Cups.

== Managerial career ==
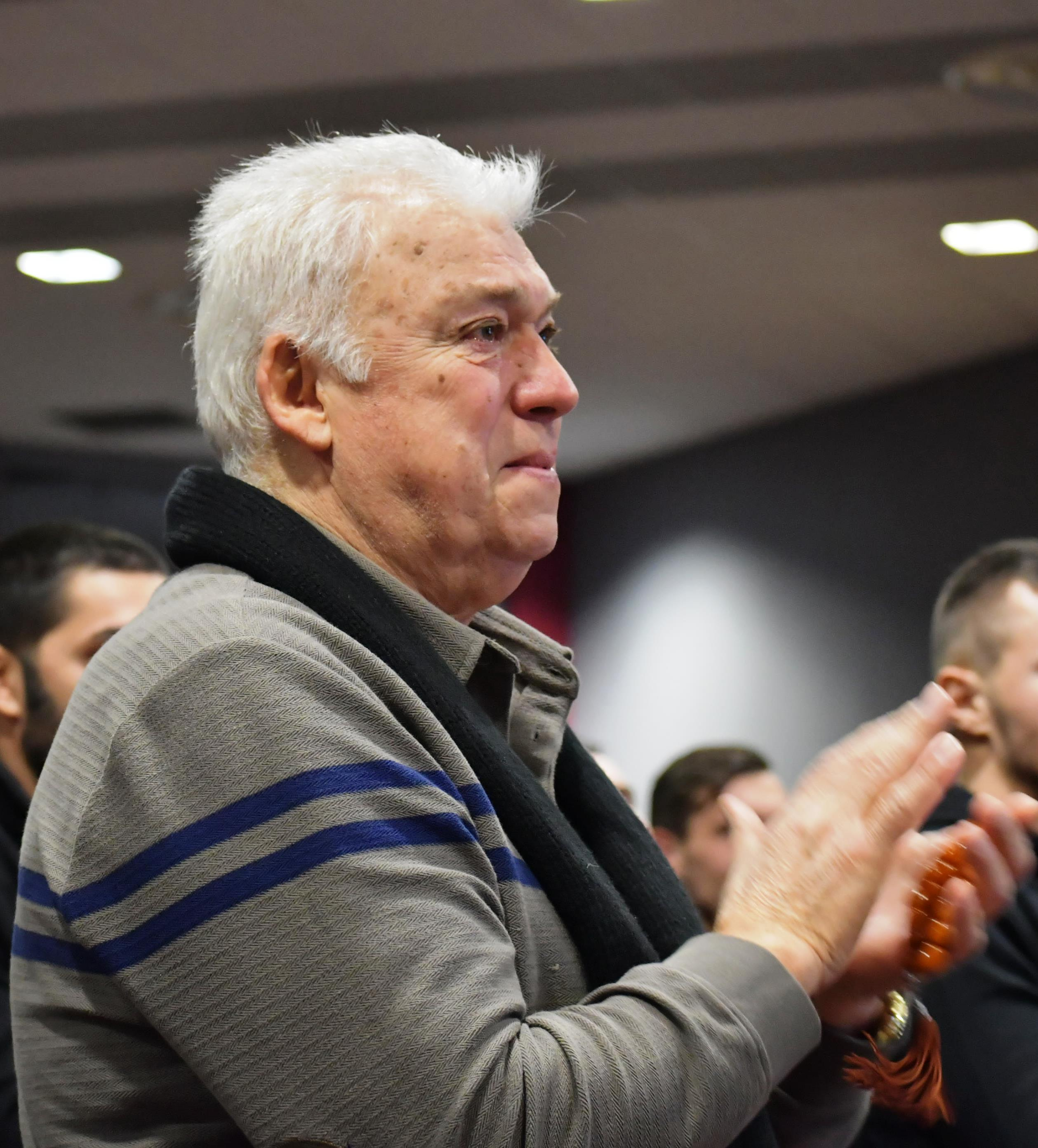
Bonev in 2018

Before ending his career at Lokomotiv Plovdiv Bonev played as a player-coach for a season. After his retirement he became a manager and initially went to Greece and became coach of Panathinaikos in 1988, where he won the Greek Championship in 1990 and he is chosen for the Manager of the season in Greece.

Then he managed AEL for three seasons following a year at Ionikos, where he won the second division league and got his club promoted to the first division. After Greece, he became manager of the Cypriot team APOEL in 1995 and until 1996 when he quit from his team, he won the Cypriot Cup in his first year in Cyprus in 1995 and the Double the following season.

He went back to his home country to become manager of Lokomotiv Sofia and then he was appointed as head coach to his country's national team for the 1998 FIFA World Cup. Despite a disappointing showing in France, with only one point achieved from three games, he continued as national coach, but after a 3–0 defeat to Poland in the first qualifying match for Euro 2000 in September 1998, he decided to resign from his post, stating "I believe I have taken the team as far as I am able, and now it is time for the players to respond to someone else who, I hope, can improve our results."

== Honours ==
=== As a player ===
Lokomotiv Plovdiv

- Cup of the Soviet Army: 1983

=== As a manager ===
Panathinaikos

- Alpha Ethniki: 1989–90

Ionikos

- Beta Ethniki: 1993–94

APOEL

- Cypriot First Division: 1995–96
- Cypriot Cup: 1995–96, 1994–95

Individual

- Bulgarian Footballer of the Year: 1969, 1972, 1973
- Best Bulgarian Footballer of 20th century: Third place
- Best Footballer of Plovdiv for 20th century
- Stara Planina Orden – 1st Class
- Honorary citizen of Plovdiv
- Manager of the year in Greece: 1989–90

== International goals ==
Scores and results list Bulgaria's goal tally first, score column indicates score after each Bonev goal.

List of international goals scored by Hristo Bonev
| No. | Date | Venue | Opponent | Score | Result | Competition |
|---|---|---|---|---|---|---|
| 1 | 9 October 1968 | Mithatpaşa Stadium, Istanbul, Turkey | Turkey | 2–0 | 2–0 | Friendly |
| 2 | 27 October 1968 | Vasil Levski National Stadium, Sofia, Bulgaria | Netherlands | 1–0 | 2–0 | 1970 FIFA World Cup qualification |
| 3 | 15 June 1969 | Vasil Levski National Stadium, Sofia, Bulgaria | Poland | 1–0 | 4–1 | 1970 FIFA World Cup qualification |
| 4 | 22 October 1969 | Stadion Feijenoord, Rotterdam, Netherlands | Netherlands | 1–1 | 1–1 | 1970 FIFA World Cup qualification |
| 5 | 7 December 1969 | Stade Josy Barthel, Luxembourg City, Luxembourg | Luxembourg | 3–1 | 3–1 | 1970 FIFA World Cup qualification |
| 6 | 5 May 1970 | Vasil Levski National Stadium, Sofia, Bulgaria | Soviet Union | 3–2 | 3–3 | Friendly |
| 7 | 2 June 1970 | Estadio León, León, Mexico | Peru | 2–0 | 2–3 | 1970 FIFA World Cup |
| 8 | 9 June 1971 | Ullevaal Stadion, Oslo, Norway | Norway | 1–0 | 4–1 | UEFA Euro 1972 qualification |
| 9 | 9 June 1971 | Ullevaal Stadion, Oslo, Norway | Norway | 4–0 | 4–1 | UEFA Euro 1972 qualification |
| 10 | 7 September 1971 | Grünwalder Stadion, Munich, Germany | (Germany) West German Amateurs | 1–3 | 1–3 | Friendly |
| 11 | 27 October 1971 | Stadionul Național, Bucharest, Romania | Romania | 1–1 | 1–1 | Unofficial Friendly |
| 12 | 10 November 1971 | Stade Marcel Saupin, Nantes, France | France | 1–0 | 1–2 | UEFA Euro 1972 qualification |
| 13 | 24 November 1971 | Vasil Levski National Stadium, Sofia, Bulgaria | Spain | 7–3 | 8–3 | 1972 Summer Olympics qualification |
| 14 | 24 March 1972 | Stadion Georgi Asparuhov, Sofia, Bulgaria | Soviet Union | 1–1 | 1–1 | Friendly |
| 15 | 16 April 1972 | Stadion Beroe, Stara Zagora, Bulgaria | Poland | 1–1 | 3–1 | 1972 Summer Olympics qualification |
| 16 | 16 April 1972 | Stadion Beroe, Stara Zagora, Bulgaria | Poland | 3–1 | 3–1 | 1972 Summer Olympics qualification |
| 17 | 31 May 1972 | Estadio El Plantío, Burgos, Spain | Spain | 1–1 | 3–3 | 1972 Summer Olympics qualification |
| 18 | 21 June 1972 | Stadion Georgi Asparuhov, Sofia, Bulgaria | Italy | 1–0 | 1–0 | Friendly |
| 19 | 18 October 1972 | Stadion Beroe, Stara Zagora, Bulgaria | Northern Ireland | 1–0 | 3–0 | 1974 FIFA World Cup qualification |
| 20 | 18 October 1972 | Stadion Beroe, Stara Zagora, Bulgaria | Northern Ireland | 3–0 | 3–0 | 1974 FIFA World Cup qualification |
| 21 | 19 November 1972 | Tsirio Stadium, Limassol, Cyprus | Cyprus | 3–0 | 4–0 | 1974 FIFA World Cup qualification |
| 22 | 19 November 1972 | Tsirio Stadium, Limassol, Cyprus | Cyprus | 4–0 | 4–0 | 1974 FIFA World Cup qualification |
| 23 | 31 January 1973 | Nikos Goumas Stadium, Athens, Greece | Greece | 2–2 | 2–2 | Friendly |
| 24 | 2 May 1973 | Stadion Georgi Asparuhov, Sofia, Bulgaria | Portugal | 2–0 | 2–1 | 1974 FIFA World Cup qualification |
| 25 | 13 October 1973 | Estádio da Luz, Lisbon, Portugal | Portugal | 1–1 | 2–2 | 1974 FIFA World Cup qualification |
| 26 | 13 October 1973 | Estádio da Luz, Lisbon, Portugal | Portugal | 2–1 | 2–2 | 1974 FIFA World Cup qualification |
| 27 | 6 February 1974 | Morphou Municipal Stadium, Morphou, Cyprus | Cyprus | 2–1 | 4–1 | 1974 FIFA World Cup qualification |
| 28 | 6 February 1974 | Morphou Municipal Stadium, Morphou, Cyprus | Cyprus | 3–1 | 4–1 | 1974 FIFA World Cup qualification |
| 29 | 6 February 1974 | Morphou Municipal Stadium, Morphou, Cyprus | Cyprus | 4–1 | 4–1 | 1974 FIFA World Cup qualification |
| 30 | 8 February 1974 | Al-Sadaqua Walsalam Stadium, Kuwait City, Kuwait | Kuwait | 2–0 | 3–1 | Friendly |
| 31 | 10 February 1974 | Al-Sadaqua Walsalam Stadium, Kuwait City, Kuwait | Kuwait | 1–1 | 2–1 | Friendly |
| 32 | 10 February 1974 | Al-Sadaqua Walsalam Stadium, Kuwait City, Kuwait | Kuwait | 2–1 | 2–1 | Friendly |
| 33 | 31 March 1974 | Z.T.E. Stadion, Zalaegerszeg, Hungary | Hungary | 1–3 | 1–3 | Friendly |
| 34 | 8 May 1974 | Vasil Levski National Stadium, Sofia, Bulgaria | Turkey | 1–0 | 5–1 | 1973–76 Balkan Cup |
| 35 | 8 May 1974 | Vasil Levski National Stadium, Sofia, Bulgaria | Turkey | 2–0^{[1]} | 5–1 | 1973–76 Balkan Cup |
| 36 | 25 May 1974 | Vasil Levski National Stadium, Sofia, Bulgaria | North Korea | 1–0 | 6–1 | Friendly |
| 37 | 25 May 1974 | Vasil Levski National Stadium, Sofia, Bulgaria | North Korea | 5–0 | 6–1 | Friendly |
| 38 | 25 May 1974 | Vasil Levski National Stadium, Sofia, Bulgaria | North Korea | 6–1 | 6–1 | Friendly |
| 39 | 19 June 1974 | Niedersachsenstadion, Hannover, Germany | Uruguay | 1–0 | 1–1 | 1974 FIFA World Cup |
| 40 | 13 October 1974 | Vasil Levski National Stadium, Sofia, Bulgaria | Greece | 1–0 | 3–2 | UEFA Euro 1976 qualification |
| 41 | 11 June 1975 | Vasil Levski National Stadium, Sofia, Bulgaria | Malta | 4–0 | 5–0 | UEFA Euro 1976 qualification |
| 42 | 25 January 1976 | National Stadium, Tokyo, Japan | Japan | 1–1 | 3–1 | Friendly |
| 43 | 28 January 1976 | Yanmar Stadium Nagai, Osaka, Japan | Japan | 1–0 | 1–1 | Friendly |
| 44 | 5 May 1976 | Vasil Levski National Stadium, Sofia, Bulgaria | North Korea | 1–0 | 3–0 | Friendly |
| 45 | 5 May 1976 | Vasil Levski National Stadium, Sofia, Bulgaria | North Korea | 2–0 | 3–0 | Friendly |
| 46 | 22 September 1976 | Vasil Levski National Stadium, Sofia, Bulgaria | Turkey | 1–0 | 2–2 | Friendly |
| 47 | 9 October 1976 | Vasil Levski National Stadium, Sofia, Bulgaria | France | 1–2 | 2–2 | 1978 FIFA World Cup qualification |
| 48 | 25 April 1979 | Estadio Monumental Antonio Vespucio Liberti, Buenos Aires, Argentina | Argentina | 1–1 | 1–2 | Friendly |

== See also ==
- List of top international men's football goal scorers by country

Notes
^{1} Some sources credit Bonev's second goal as an own-goal by Nikos Kovis.
