= Owen Bugeja =

Maltese footballer

Personal information
- Full name: Owen Bugeja
- Date of birth: 20 February 1990 (age 36)
- Place of birth: Malta
- Position: Centre-back

Senior career*
Years	Team	Apps	(Gls)
–2013	Floriana	105	(1)
2013–2014	Qormi	23	(1)
2014–2015	Tarxien Rainbows	17	(0)
2015–2018	Pembroke Athleta	56+	(1+)

International career^{‡}
2005–2006	Malta U17	4	(0)
2008	Malta U19	3	(0)
2011–2012	Malta U21	8	(0)
2015	Malta	1	(0)
- * Club domestic league appearances and goals as of 06:38, 5 May 2020 (UTC) ‡ National team caps and goals as of 06:38, 5 May 2020 (UTC)

Owen Bugeja (born 20 February 1990) is a Maltese retired footballer who last played as a centre-back for Pembroke Athleta. He made one appearance for the Malta national team in 2015.

== Career ==
Bugeja made his international debut for Malta on 11 November 2015 in a friendly against Jordan. The match, which was played in Istanbul, finished as a 0–2 loss.

== Career statistics ==
=== International ===
As of 11 November 2015

Malta
Year	Apps	Goals
2015	1	0
Total	1	0
