= Raymond Mifsud =

Maltese footballer

Ray Mifsud
Personal information
- Date of birth: 2 February 1958 (age 68)
- Place of birth: Malta
- Position: Goalkeeper

Youth career
- Kirkop United

Senior career*
Years	Team	Apps	(Gls)
1980–1988	Valletta	76	(0)
1991–1996	Pietà Hotspurs	66	(0)
1998–1999	Mellieħa	5	(0)

International career
1984–1986	Malta	6	(0)
1984	Malta XI	1	(0)
- * Club domestic league appearances and goals

Raymond Mifsud (born 2 February 1958) is a retired footballer, who represented the Malta national team. During his career, he played as a goalkeeper for Valletta and Pietà Hotspurs.

== International career ==
Mifsud made his debut for Malta in a May 1984 World Cup qualification match away against Sweden and earned a total of 7 caps (1 unofficial). His final international was a November 1986 European Championship qualification match against Sweden.

== Honours ==
- Maltese Premier League: 2

1980, 1984

- Maltese Challenge League: 1

1996
