= Vincent Borg Bonaci =

Maltese players

Personal information
- Full name: Vincent Borg Bonaci
- Date of birth: 11 December 1943
- Place of birth: Malta
- Date of death: 19 August 2006 (aged 62)
- Position: Goalkeeper

Senior career*
Years	Team	Apps	(Gls)
1963–1973	Valletta F.C.	112	

International career^{‡}
1969–1972	Malta	9	(0)
- * Club domestic league appearances and goals ‡ National team caps and goals as of 7 March 2012

Vincent Borg Bonaci (born 11 December 1943) is a Maltese former professional footballer.

== Club career ==
Bonaci was the first choice goalkeeper for Valletta F.C. He is known in Malta for the success he achieved in the 1968-69 season where he went 600 minutes without conceding and came third in the vote for Maltese Sportsman of the Year. Bonaci is a member of the Valletta F.C. hall of fame.

== International career ==
He was a member of the Malta national football team from 1969 to 1972.
