= Clyde Borg =

Maltese international footballer

Personal information
- Date of birth: 20 March 1992 (age 34)
- Position: Midfielder

Team information
- Current team: Floriana

Senior career*
Years	Team	Apps	(Gls)
2008–	Floriana	204	(3)

International career^{‡}
2015–	Malta	3	(0)
- * Club domestic league appearances and goals as of 19:05, 25 January 2018 (UTC) ‡ National team caps and goals as of 19:05, 25 January 2018 (UTC)

Clyde Borg (born 20 March 1992) is a Maltese international footballer who plays for Floriana as a midfielder.
