= Chris Vella =

Maltese footballer

Personal information
- Date of birth: 28 July 1955 (age 71)
- Place of birth: St. Julian's, Malta
- Position: Midfielder

Youth career
- Kirkop United

Senior career*
Years	Team	Apps	(Gls)
1972–1980	Hibernians	113	(46)
1980–1983	Sliema Wanderers	27	(4)
Total		140	(50)

International career
1975–1977	Malta	5	(0)
1978	Malta XI	1	(0)
- * Club domestic league appearances and goals

Chris Vella (born 28 July 1955) is a Maltese retired footballer.

== Club career ==
Born in St. Julian's, Malta, Vella played the majority of his career for Hibernians as a midfielder.

== International career ==
Vella made his debut for Malta in a December 1975 European Championship qualification match against Bulgaria and earned a total of 6 caps (1 unofficial), scoring no goals. His final international was a March 1978 friendly match against Tunisia.

== Honours ==
Ħibernians

- Maltese Premier League: 1979
