= Emanuel Briffa =

Maltese footballer

Personal information
- Full name: Emanuel Briffa
- Date of birth: 13 February 1994 (age 32)
- Place of birth: Għaxaq, Malta
- Height: 1.75 m (5 ft 9 in)
- Positions: Defender; midfielder

Senior career*
Years	Team	Apps	(Gls)
2012–2016	Floriana	64	(1)

International career
2015–2016	Malta U21	7	(0)
2015	Malta	1	(0)
- * Club domestic league appearances and goals

Emanuel Briffa (born 13 February 1994) is a Maltese former footballer who played as a defender or midfielder and made one appearance for the Malta national team.

== Career ==
Briffa earned his first and only cap for Malta on 11 November 2015 in a friendly against Jordan. The match, which was played in Istanbul, finished as a 0–2 loss.

In 2016, Briffa was charged in a Maltese court for match-fixing. However, he was acquitted as charges were filed prior to the expiration of a three-month window which is allotted for players to report irregularities to the relevant authorities. However, he was suspended by the Malta Football Association pending an investigation by UEFA. Briffa received a lifelong ban from UEFA on 9 January 2018 for match-fixing offences during the 2017 UEFA European Under-21 Championship qualification tournament (against Montenegro on 23 March 2016 and the Czech Republic on 29 March 2016). Five other Malta under-21 national team players were also disciplined. However, Briffa protested his innocence following the decision.

== Career statistics ==
=== International ===
Malta
Year	Apps	Goals
2015	1	0
Total	1	0
