= Anton Camilleri =

Maltese footballer

Personal information
- Date of birth: 17 April 1947 (age 79)
- Place of birth: Floriana, Malta
- Position: Defender

Senior career*
| Years | Team | Apps | (Gls) |
| 1969–1982 | Floriana | 148 | (2) |

International career
| 1970-1977 | Malta | 16 | (0) |
| 1973 | Malta XI | 1 | (0) |
- * Club domestic league appearances and goals

Anton Camilleri (born 17 April 1947 in Floriana) is a Maltese retired footballer.

== Club career ==
During his career, Camilleri played his entire career for hometown club Floriana as a defender, making his debut against Valletta in 1966. He would still play seven-a-side football in 2014, aged 67.

== International career ==
Camilleri made his debut for Malta in a January 1970 friendly match against Luxembourg and earned a total of 17 caps (1 unofficial). His final international was an October 1977 World Cup qualification match away against East Germany.

== Honours ==
- Maltese Premier League: 4

1968, 1970, 1975, 1977,

- FA Trophy: 3

1967, 1972, 1976
