= Charles Micallef =

Maltese footballer

Personal information
- Full name: Charles Micallef
- Date of birth: 6 July 1960 (age 66)
- Place of birth: Malta
- Position: Midfielder

Senior career*
Years	Team	Apps	(Gls)
- Żurrieq

International career^{‡}
1988	Malta	7	(0)
- * Club domestic league appearances and goals as of 14 February 2010 ‡ National team caps and goals as of 14 February 2010

Charles Micallef (born 6 July 1960) was a Maltese professional footballer. During his career, he played for Żurrieq, where he played as a midfielder. He earned seven caps with the Malta national team.
