= 1954–55 Maltese Premier League =

Maltese First Division
- Season: 1954–55
- Champions: Floriana F.C. (17th title)
- Relegated: St. George's F.C.
- Matches played: 56
- Goals scored: 176 (3.14 per match)

The 1954–55 Maltese First Division was the 40th season of top-tier football in Malta. It was contested by 8 teams, and Floriana F.C. won the championship.

== League standings ==
Pos	Team	Pld	W	D	L	GF	GA	GD	Pts	Qualification
1	Floriana F.C. (C)	14	13	0	1	40	7	+33	26	Champions
2	Sliema Wanderers F.C.	14	10	1	3	33	16	+17	21	
3	Hamrun Spartans F.C.	14	7	4	3	23	8	+15	18	
4	Valletta F.C.	14	5	3	6	18	22	−4	13	
5	Birkirkara F.C.	14	4	2	8	17	23	−6	10	
6	Hibernians F.C.	14	4	2	8	18	32	−14	10	
7	Rabat	14	2	5	7	12	28	−16	9	
8	St. George's F.C. (R)	14	1	3	10	15	40	−25	5	Relegation

Source: rsssf.com
(C) Champions; (R) Relegated

== Results ==
Home \ Away	BKR	FRN	HIB	ĦMR	RBT	SLM	STG	VLT
Birkirkara	—	0–1	2–0	2–2	0–2	1–2	1–1	2–0
Floriana	2–0	—	6–0	1–0	7–0	0–2	3–2	3–1
Hibernians	1–2	0–5	—	1–1	2–1	3–5	1–0	2–1
Ħamrun Spartans	3–0	0–1	1–0	—	1–0	0–0	7–0	1–1
Rabat	0–4	1–2	1–1	0–4	—	2–1	1–1	0–0
Sliema Wanderers	3–1	0–1	3–1	0–2	2–1	—	4–0	3–2
St. George's	4–2	0–2	1–5	0–1	3–3	2–5	—	0–3
Valletta	2–0	1–6	3–1	2–0	0–0	0–3	2–1	—

Legend: Blue = home team win; Yellow = draw; Red = away team win.
