= 1951–52 Maltese Premier League =

Maltese First Division
- Season: 1951–52
- Champions: Floriana F.C. (15th title)
- Relegated: St. Patrick F.C.
- Matches played: 56
- Goals scored: 212 (3.79 per match)

The 1951–52 Maltese First Division was the 37th season of top-tier football in Malta. It was contested by 8 teams, and Floriana F.C. won the championship.

== League standings ==
Pos	Team	Pld	W	D	L	GF	GA	GD	Pts	Qualification
1	Floriana F.C. (C)	14	11	2	1	48	12	+36	24	Champions
2	Hamrun Spartans F.C.	14	9	2	3	32	16	+16	20	
3	Sliema Wanderers F.C.	14	7	5	2	27	15	+12	19	
4	Valletta F.C.	14	7	2	5	34	19	+15	16	
5	Hibernians F.C.	14	5	5	4	33	22	+11	13 (Note: 2 points deducted)	
6	St. George's F.C.	14	5	1	8	18	28	−10	11	
7	Rabat	14	1	3	10	10	37	−27	5	
8	St. Patrick F.C. (R)	14	0	2	12	10	63	−53	4 (Note: 2 bonus points awarded)	Relegation

Source: rsssf.com
(C) Champions; (R) Relegated

== Results ==
Home \ Away	FRN	HIB	ĦMR	RBT	SLM	STG	STP	VLT
Floriana	—	2–1	4–0	2–0	2–2	4–0	11–0	0–1
Hibernians	2–3	—	2–2	0–0	3–2	1–2	5–0	1–1
Ħamrun Spartans	2–3	1–2	—	3–0	1–1	4–0	5–1	1–0
Rabat	1–2	1–5	0–3	—	1–5	1–5	1–0	1–5
Sliema Wanderers	2–2	1–1	0–1	1–1	—	3–1	2–1	1–0
St. George'	0–3	0–0	1–2	2–0	1–2	—	3–1	0–4
St. Patrick	0–8	1–8 (Note: The points from the match between St. Patrick and Hibernians were awarded to St. Patrick. The result remained unchanged.)	0–4	2–2	0–2	1–2	—	3–3
Valletta	1–2	6–2	2–3	2–1	0–3	2–1	7–0	—

Legend: Blue = home team win; Yellow = draw; Red = away team win.
