= 1961–62 Maltese Premier League =

Maltese First Division
- Season: 1961–62
- Champions: Floriana F.C. (19th title)
- Relegated: St. Patrick F.C.
- European Cup: Floriana F.C.
- European Cup Winners' Cup: Hibernians F.C.
- Matches played: 56
- Goals scored: 201 (3.59 per match)

The 1961–62 Maltese First Division was the 47th season of top-tier football in Malta. It was contested by 8 teams, and Floriana F.C. won the championship.

== League standings ==
Pos	Team	Pld	W	D	L	GF	GA	GD	Pts	Qualification
1	Floriana F.C. (C)	14	14	0	0	43	10	+33	28	Qualification for the European Cup
2	Valletta F.C.	14	12	0	2	38	10	+28	24	
3	Sliema Wanderers F.C.	14	7	3	4	25	20	+5	17	
4	Hibernians F.C.	14	5	3	6	27	21	+6	13	Qualification for the European Cup Winners' Cup (Note: Hibernians qualified for the Cup Winners' Cup as Maltese FA Trophy Winners)
5	Hamrun Spartans F.C.	14	3	4	7	21	28	−7	10	
6	Birkirkara F.C.	14	4	1	9	19	40	−21	9	
7	St. George's F.C.	14	3	1	10	15	28	−13	7	
8	St. Patrick F.C. (R)	14	1	2	11	13	44	−31	4	Relegation

Source: rsssf.com
(C) Champions; (R) Relegated

== Results ==
Home \ Away	BKR	FRN	HIB	ĦMR	SLM	STG	STP	VLT
Birkirkara	—	0–4	3–1	3–6	0–3	2–0	3–2	1–3
Floriana	6–1	—	1–0	3–1	2–0	2–0	5–1	3–0
Hibernians	0–0	2–3	—	3–0	3–3	5–0	5–1	0–1
Ħamrun Spartans	2–1	1–5	0–2	—	1–1	1–4	6–0	1–3
Sliema Wanderers	6–1	0–2	2–0	0–0	—	2–1	3–0	0–7
St. George's	1–2	3–4	1–2	0–0	0–1	—	3–1	0–1
St. Patrick	2–1	1–2	3–3	1–1	0–3	1–2	—	0–6
Valletta	4–1	0–1	3–1	2–1	3–1	4–0	1–0	—

Legend: Blue = home team win; Yellow = draw; Red = away team win.
