= 1952–53 Maltese Premier League =

Maltese First Division
- Season: 1952–53
- Champions: Floriana F.C. (16th title)
- Relegated: St. George's F.C.
- Matches played: 56
- Goals scored: 151 (2.7 per match)

The 1952–53 Maltese First Division was the 38th season of top-tier football in Malta. It was contested by 8 teams, and Floriana F.C. won the championship.

== League standings ==
Pos	Team	Pld	W	D	L	GF	GA	GD	Pts	Qualification
1	Floriana F.C. (C)	14	9	3	2	27	12	+15	21	Champions
2	Birkirkara F.C.	14	9	2	3	19	10	+9	20	
3	Valletta F.C.	14	7	5	2	26	17	+9	19	
4	Sliema Wanderers F.C.	14	4	5	5	20	16	+4	13	
5	Hibernians F.C.	14	4	4	6	22	25	−3	12	
6	Rabat	14	4	3	7	13	18	−5	11	
7	Hamrun Spartans F.C.	14	3	3	8	14	19	−5	9	
8	St. George's F.C. (R)	14	2	3	9	10	34	−24	7	Relegation

Source: rsssf.com
(C) Champions; (R) Relegated

== Results ==
Home \ Away	BKR	FRN	HIB	ĦMR	RBT	SLM	STG	VLT
Birkirkara	—	1–3	2–1	1–0	0–1	0–0	2–0	1–1
Floriana	0–1	—	2–0	1–1	2–1	3–1	1–2	3–1
Hibernians	2–5	2–3	—	3–1	3–1	1–0	1–1	0–0
Ħamrun Spartans	0–1	0–0	5–1	—	1–3	1–1	2–0	1–2
Rabat	0–1	0–1	2–1	1–0	—	0–0	1–2	2–2
Sliema Wanderers	0–1	1–1	2–2	1–0	1–0	—	4–0	0–2
St. George's	1–3	0–4	1–5	0–1	0–0	1–6	—	1–1
Valletta	1–0	1–3	0–0	4–1	4–1	4–3	3–1	—

Legend: Blue = home team win; Yellow = draw; Red = away team win.
