= 1950–51 Maltese Premier League =

Maltese First Division
- Season: 1950–51
- Champions: Floriana F.C. (14th title)
- Relegated: St. Andrews F.C.
- Matches played: 56
- Goals scored: 189 (3.38 per match)

The 1950–51 Maltese First Division was the 36th season of top-tier football in Malta. It was contested by 8 teams, and Floriana F.C. won the championship.

== League standings ==
Pos	Team	Pld	W	D	L	GF	GA	GD	Pts	Qualification
1	Floriana F.C. (C)	14	10	3	1	37	12	+25	23	Champions
2	Hibernians F.C.	14	9	2	3	21	12	+9	20	
3	Valletta F.C.	14	8	2	4	38	13	+25	18	
4	Sliema Wanderers F.C.	14	8	2	4	25	11	+14	18	
5	Hamrun Spartans F.C.	14	7	1	6	30	14	+16	15	
6	St. George's F.C.	14	5	1	8	18	32	−14	11	
7	St. Patrick F.C.	14	3	0	11	12	50	−38	6	
8	St. Andrews F.C. (R)	14	0	1	13	8	45	−37	1	Relegation

Source: rsssf.com
(C) Champions; (R) Relegated

== Results ==
Home \ Away	FRN	HIB	ĦMR	SLM	STA	STG	STP	VLT
Floriana	—	3–1	2–1	1–0	0–0	5–1	7–0	0–0
Hibernians	0–0	—	0–4	2–0	2–0	1–0	5–0	1–0
Ħamrun Spartans	0–1	0–1	—	0–0	6–0	0–2	3–0	1–2
Sliema Wanderers	4–1	1–1	1–0	—	3–0	3–0	2–1	1–2
St. Andrews	1–5	1–2	2–4	0–5	—	1–2	1–2	2–5
St. George's	2–6	2–1	1–3	1–3	2–0	—	2–1	0–3
St. Patrick	1–4	0–2	1–6	1–2	2–0	3–1	—	0–9
Valletta	1–2	1–2	1–2	1–0	5–0	2–2	6–0	—

Legend: Blue = home team win; Yellow = draw; Red = away team win.
