= 1949–50 Maltese Premier League =

Maltese First Division
- Season: 1949–50
- Champions: Floriana F.C. (13th title)
- Relegated: Birkirkara F.C.
- Matches played: 56
- Goals scored: 194 (3.46 per match)

The 1949–50 Maltese First Division was the 35th season of top-tier football in Malta. It was contested by 8 teams, and Floriana F.C. won the championship.

== League standings ==
Pos	Team	Pld	W	D	L	GF	GA	GD	Pts	Qualification
1	Floriana F.C. (C)	14	11	1	2	42	8	+34	23	Champions
2	Hamrun Spartans F.C.	14	10	2	2	37	14	+23	22	
3	Sliema Wanderers F.C.	14	8	3	3	31	15	+16	19	
4	Valletta F.C.	14	7	2	5	30	14	+16	16	
5	St. George's F.C.	14	6	2	6	23	34	−11	14	
6	Hibernians F.C.	14	2	4	8	10	26	−16	8	
7	St. Andrews F.C.	14	2	2	10	15	42	−27	6	
8	Birkirkara F.C. (R)	14	0	4	10	6	41	−35	4	Relegation

Source: rsssf.com
(C) Champions; (R) Relegated

== Results ==
Home \ Away	BKR	FRN	HIB	ĦMR	SLM	STA	STG	VLT
Birkirkara	—	1–7	1–1	0–4	0–2	2–2	1–2	0–3
Floriana	6–0	—	5–0	3–1	1–2	2–0	5–0	2–0
Hibernians	0–0	0–2	—	1–3	2–2	1–0	1–2	0–2
Ħamrun Spartans	1–1	1–2	0–0	—	4–1	4–2	5–2	3–0
Sliema Wanderers	5–0	0–2	4–0	1–2	—	4–0	2–2	2–1
St. Andrews	2–0	1–1	3–1	0–4	0–3	—	2–3	0–5
St. George's	1–0	1–0	0–2	1–4	1–3	7–3	—	0–5
Valletta	5–0	1–4	2–1	0–1	0–0	5–0	1–1	—

Legend: Blue = home team win; Yellow = draw; Red = away team win.
