= 1972–73 Maltese Premier League =

Maltese First Division
- Season: 1972–73
- Champions: Floriana F.C. (22nd title)
- Relegated: St. George's F.C. St. Patrick F.C.
- European Cup: Floriana F.C.
- European Cup Winners' Cup: Gzira United
- UEFA Cup: Sliema Wanderers F.C.
- Matches played: 91
- Goals scored: 200 (2.2 per match)

The 1972–73 Maltese First Division was the 58th season of top-tier football in Malta. It was contested by 10 teams, and Floriana F.C. won the championship.

== League standings ==
Pos	Team	Pld	W	D	L	GF	GA	GD	Pts	Qualification
1	Floriana F.C. (C)	18	12	2	4	31	10	+21	26	Qualification for the European Cup
2	Sliema Wanderers F.C.	18	10	5	3	34	14	+20	25	Qualification for the UEFA Cup
3	Hamrun Spartans F.C.	18	10	5	3	25	10	+15	25	
4	Valletta F.C.	18	9	6	3	29	14	+15	24	
5	Birkirkara F.C.	18	8	8	2	17	9	+8	24	
6	Hibernians F.C.	18	5	5	8	15	15	0	15	
7	Gzira United	18	5	5	8	13	20	−7	15	Qualification for the European Cup Winners' Cup (Note: Gzira United qualified for the Cup Winners' Cup as Maltese FA Trophy Winners)
8	Marsa F.C.	18	4	6	8	15	22	−7	14	
9	St. George's F.C. (R)	18	2	5	11	7	25	−18	9	Relegation
10	St. Patrick F.C. (R)	18	1	1	16	11	58	−47	3	Relegation

Source: rsssf.com
(C) Champions; (R) Relegated

== Second Place tie-breaker ==
With both Sliema Wanderers and Hamrun Spartans level on 25 points, a play-off match was conducted to qualification for the UEFA Cup

Sliema Wanderers	3–0	Hamrun Spartans

== Results ==
Home \ Away	BKR	FRN	GŻI	HIB	ĦMR	MRS	SLM	STG	STP	VLT
Birkirkara	—	0–1	0–0	0–0	0–0	0–0	1–4	2–0	2–0	1–1
Floriana	0–1	—	1–0	2–1	1–1	3–0	2–1	4–0	2–0	2–2
Gżira United	0–1	1–0	—	0–2	0–2	2–1	1–4	1–1	2–0	1–1
Hibernians	1–2	0–2	2–0	—	0–2	0–0	0–3	0–0	2–0	0–1
Ħamrun Spartans	0–0	0–1	0–0	1–0	—	1–0	0–0	1–0	2–1	1–0
Marsa	0–0	0–3	0–1	0–2	1–4	—	2–2	1–0	5–2	0–0
Sliema Wanderers	0–0	2–1	3–0	1–0	2–1	1–2	—	0–0	1–1	5–1
St. George's	1–3	0–2	1–0	0–0	0–4	0–0	0–1	—	0–1	0–1
St. Patrick	1–3	0–4	0–3	1–5	1–5	0–3	0–3	2–4	—	0–8
Valletta	0–1	1–0	1–1	0–0	3–0	1–0	2–1	2–0	4–1	—

Legend: Blue = home team win; Yellow = draw; Red = away team win.
