= Charles Spiteri =

Maltese footballer (1944–2025)

Charlie Spiteri
Personal information
- Date of birth: 13 February 1944
- Place of birth: Birkirkara, Malta
- Date of death: 26 March 2025 (aged 81)
- Position: Defender

Senior career*
Years	Team	Apps	(Gls)
1963–1971	Sliema Wanderers		
1971–1977	Birkirkara		
1977–1980	Valletta		
1987–1989	Lija Athletic	25	

International career
1971–1973	Malta	7	(0)
1973	Malta XI	1	(0)
- * Club domestic league appearances and goals

Charles Spiteri (13 February 1944 – 26 March 2025) was a Maltese footballer who played as a defender.

== Club career ==
Spiteri won the Quadruple Crown (league title, FA Trophy and two more domestic cups) with Sliema Wanderers in the 1964–65 season. Nicknamed Il-Kiskisell, he was renowned for his long throw-ins and also was a successful water polo player.

== International career ==
Spiteri made his debut for Malta in a December 1971 friendly match against Algeria and earned a total of eight caps (one unofficial). His final international was a November 1973 World Cup qualification match against Sweden.

== Death ==
Spiteri died on 26 March 2025, at the age of 81.
