= Alfredo Quaresma =

Portuguese footballer

Personal information
- Full name: Alfredo Perrulas Quaresma
- Date of birth: 16 July 1944
- Place of birth: Funchal, Madeira, Portugal
- Date of death: 30 March 2007 (aged 62)
- Position: Forward

Senior career*
| Years | Team | Apps | (Gls) |
| 1972–1974 | Belenenses | | |

International career
| 1973 | Portugal | 3 | (1) |
- * Club domestic league appearances and goals

Alfredo Perrulas Quaresma (16 July 1944 – 30 March 2007) was a Portuguese footballer who played as forward.

== Football career ==
Quaresma gained 3 caps and scored 1 goal for Portugal and made his debut 3 March 1973 in Paris against France, in a 2–1 win. He played his last game on 13 October 1973, in a 2–2 draw with Bulgaria, where he also scored his only international goal.

Alfredo Quaresma: International goals
| No. | Date | Venue | Opponent | Score | Result | Competition |
|---|---|---|---|---|---|---|
| 1 | 13 October 1973 | Estádio da Luz (1954), Lisbon, Portugal | Bulgaria | 2–2 | 2–2 | 1974 World Cup qualification |

== Personal life ==
Many media outlets referred to him as being the great-uncle of another footballer, Ricardo Quaresma, though the latter later denied this.
