= 1969–70 Maltese Premier League =

Annual soccer tournament

Maltese First Division
- Season: 1969–70
- Champions: Floriana F.C. (21st title)
- Relegated: Hamrun Spartans F.C. Msida Saint-Joseph F.C.
- European Cup: Floriana F.C.
- European Cup Winners' Cup: Hibernians F.C.
- Inter-Cities Fairs Cup: Sliema Wanderers F.C.
- Matches played: 56
- Goals scored: 119 (2.13 per match)

The 1969–70 Maltese First Division was the 55th season of top-tier football in Malta. It was contested by 8 teams, and Floriana F.C. won the championship.

== League standings ==
Pos	Team	Pld	W	D	L	GF	GA	GD	Pts	Qualification
1	Floriana F.C. (C)	14	9	4	1	19	7	+12	22	Qualification for the European Cup
2	Sliema Wanderers F.C.	14	7	5	2	24	9	+15	19	Qualification for the Inter-Cities Fairs Cup
3	Hibernians F.C.	14	7	3	4	19	10	+9	17	Qualification for the European Cup Winners' Cup (Note: Hibernians qualified for the Cup Winners' Cup as Maltese FA Trophy Winners)
4	Valletta F.C.	14	6	5	3	13	6	+7	17	
5	Gzira United	14	6	1	7	13	18	−5	13	
6	Qormi F.C.	14	4	4	6	12	16	−4	12	
7	Hamrun Spartans F.C. (R)	14	3	5	6	11	19	−8	11	Relegation
8	Msida Saint-Joseph F.C. (R)	14	0	1	13	8	34	−26	1	Relegation

Source: rsssf.com
(C) Champions; (R) Relegated

== Results ==
Home \ Away	FRN	GŻI	HIB	ĦMR	MSD	QOR	SLM	VLT
Floriana	—	2–0	1–0	0–0	3–1	1–0	2–2	0–0
Gżira United	1–1	—	2–0	3–0	1–0	0–2	0–4	2–0
Hibernians	1–0	3–1	—	1–0	1–0	4–0	0–2	1–1
Ħamrun Spartans	1–3	1–2	0–4	—	2–1	0–0	0–0	0–0
Msida Saint-Joseph	0–1	0–1	1–1	1–5	—	1–3	1–3	0–1
Qormi	0–2	1–0	0–2	1–2	4–0	—	1–1	0–0
Sliema Wanderers	0–1	2–0	1–1	3–0	5–2	0–0	—	1–0
Valletta	1–2	2–0	1–0	0–0	3–0	3–0	1–0	—

Legend: Blue = home team win; Yellow = draw; Red = away team win.
