= Jacob Schorer =

Dutch footballer (1866–1936)

Personal information
- Full name: Jacob Willem Schorer
- Date of birth: 14 April 1866
- Place of birth: Middelburg, Zeeland
- Date of death: 15 February 1936 (aged 69)
- Place of death: Den Haag, Netherlands
- Position: Forward

Senior career*
Years	Team	Apps	(Gls)
1892–1894	Koninklijke HFC		

International career
1894	Netherlands unofficial team	1	(0)
- * Club domestic league appearances and goals

Jacob Willem Schorer (14 April 1866 – 15 February 1936) was a Dutch footballer who played as a Forward for Koninklijke HFC and the Netherlands national team (unofficial) in the early 1890s.

== Early and personal life ==
Jacob Schorer was born in Middelburg, Zeeland, on 14 December 1874, as the son of Maria Petronella Pické (1836–1888) and Johan Willem Meinard Schorer, then the mayor of Middelburg and later vice-president of the Council of State. On 16 August 1898, he married Adrienne Cornélie Schuurbeque Boeye.

== Playing career ==
Together with Pim Mulier, Solco Tromp, Albertus Putman Cramer, Schorer was a member of the Koninklijke HFC team that won the first ever cup match in the Netherlands on 11 February 1894, helping his side to a 3–1 win over Haarlem. Two months later, on 10 April, he played for the an unofficial match for the Netherlands against Maidstone FC on the field of the HFC, scoring once to help his side to a 4–3 win.

== Later life ==
In 1918, he became the leader of the distance marches of the "Nederlandse Bond voor Lichamelijke Opvoeding". He was an Officer in the Order of Orange-Nassau, and an Honorary Knight of the Hospitaller Order of St. John.

Schorer died in Den Haag on 15 February 1936, at the age of 69.

== Honours ==
Koninklijke HFC

- Dutch Championship:
  - Champions (1): 1892–93
