= Solco Tromp =

Dutch footballer (1874–1962)

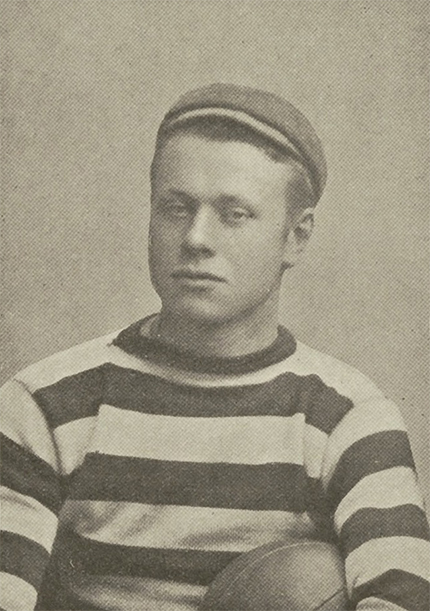
- Solco Tromp with the HFC jersey

Personal information
- Full name: Solco Walle Tromp
- Date of birth: 14 December 1874
- Place of birth: Simpoer, Bhagalpur division, Dutch East Indies
- Date of death: 6 February 1962 (aged 87)
- Place of death: Leiden, Netherlands
- Position: Goalkeeper

Senior career*
Years	Team	Apps	(Gls)
1892–1894	Koninklijke HFC		
1897–1898	Koninklijke HFC		

International career
1894	Netherlands unofficial team	2	(0)
- * Club domestic league appearances and goals

Solco Walle Tromp (14 December 1874 – 6 February 1962) was a Dutch footballer who played as a goalkeeper for Koninklijke HFC and the Netherlands national team (unofficial) in the early 1890s.

== Early life ==
Solco Tromp was born in Simpoer, Bhagalpur division, on 14 December 1874, as the son of Solco Walle Tromp and Henriëtte Gertrude Zoetelief.

== Playing career ==
=== Club career ===
Together with Pim Mulier, Johan Schröder, Jacob Schorer, Albertus Putman Cramer, Tromp was a member of the Koninklijke HFC team that won the first ever cup match in the Netherlands on 11 February 1894, helping his side to a 3–1 win over Haarlem. Five days earlier, he had been one of the eleven footballers who started in the Netherlands' first-ever unofficial international match on 6 February 1894 against the English side Felixstowe United, which ended in a 0–1 loss, but such was the English supremacy at the time that this was still an incredible result. He also played in the team's second match on 10 April 1894 against Maidstone FC on the field of the HFC, helping his side to a 4–3 win, thanks to goals from his club teammates Schorer, Pim Mulier, and Puck Meijer.

In 1894, Tromp left for Leiden to study, where he remained active as an athlete, being a member of the student rowing club SRV Njord. In the 1897–98 season, Tromp returned briefly to the HFC, which had been relegated to the Second Division after its most prominent footballers had left. With the returning captain Otto Menten in the selection, the HFC became champions of the Second Division, after which they won the promotion match against CFC Celeritas 4–1.

Tromp then established himself as a lawyer in Rotterdam. He died in Laiden on 6 February 1962, at the age of 87. His son Solco Walle Tromp was a professor of geology at the University of Cairo and published pioneering writings on biometeorology.

== Honours ==
Koninklijke HFC

- Dutch Championship:
  - Champions (1): 1892–93
- Dutch Second Division:
  - Champions (1): 1897–98
