= Andreas Köpke =

German footballer

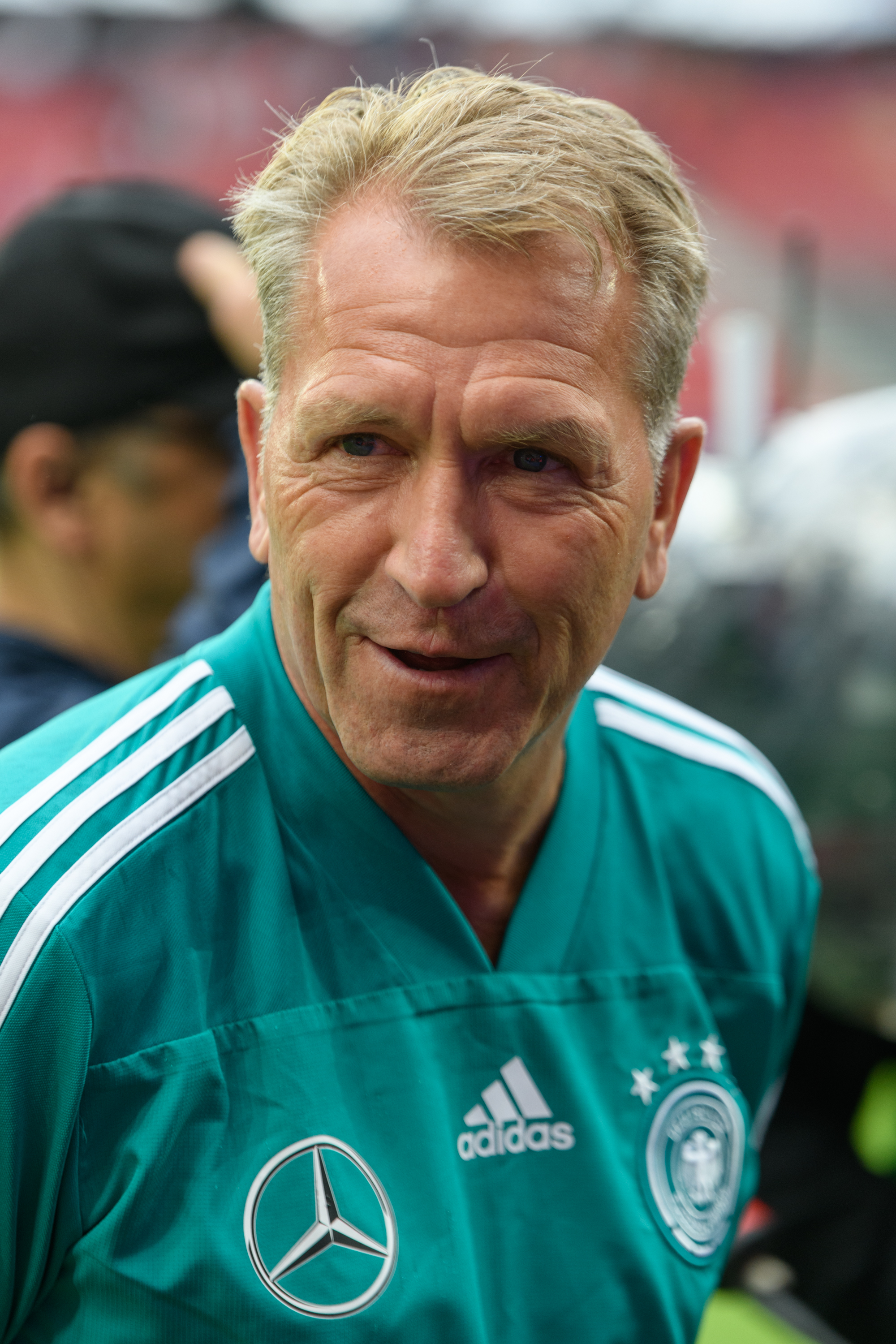
- Köpke with Germany in 2018

Personal information
- Date of birth: 12 March 1962 (age 64)
- Place of birth: Kiel, West Germany
- Height: 1.82 m (6 ft 0 in)
- Position: Goalkeeper

Team information
- Current team: South Korea (Goalkeeping coach)

Youth career
- 1967–1979: Holstein Kiel

Senior career*
Years	Team	Apps	(Gls)
1979–1983	Holstein Kiel	72	(0)
1983–1984	SC Charlottenburg	38	(0)
1984–1986	Hertha BSC	71	(0)
1986–1994	1. FC Nürnberg	235	(2)
1994–1996	Eintracht Frankfurt	66	(0)
1996–1999	Marseille	64	(0)
1999–2001	1. FC Nürnberg	74	(0)
Total		620	(2)

International career
1987–1988	West Germany Olympic	8	(0)
1990–1998	Germany	59	(0)

Managerial career
- 2004–2021: Germany (Goalkeeping coach)
- 2023–2024: South Korea (Goalkeeping coach)
Medal record
Men's football
Representing Germany
FIFA World Cup
Winner	1990 Italy
UEFA European Championship
Winner	1996 England
Runner-up	1992 Sweden
- * Club domestic league appearances and goals

Andreas "Andy" Köpke (German pronunciation: [anˈdʁeːas ˈʔandiː ˈkœpkə]; born 12 March 1962) is a German former professional footballer who played as a goalkeeper. After being selected for the Germany national team squads that won the 1990 FIFA World Cup and reached the quarter-finals of the 1994 FIFA World Cup, he succeeded Bodo Illgner to become Germany's first-choice goalkeeper at UEFA Euro 1996 (which Germany won) and the 1998 FIFA World Cup.

== Career ==
Köpke began his professional club career at Holstein Kiel in the summer of 1979.

Having been chosen as the best player in Germany in 1993, his biggest achievement came in 1996, winning the European Championship and playing a pivotal role in Germany's campaign. In the last group match he saved Gianfranco Zola's penalty for Italy and also saved Gareth Southgate's penalty in the semi-final shootout victory against England. Due to his success with the German team he was voted FIFA goalkeeper of the year.

Köpke was also Germany's first-choice goalkeeper at 1998 FIFA World Cup. In the team's second group match against Yugoslavia, he made an error when attempting to claim a low cross, allowing Dragan Stojković to score and give the opposing team a 2–0 lead; Germany eventually came back to achieve a 2–2 draw. Their campaign ended in a 3–0 loss to Croatia in the quarter-finals. Having already made his decision to retire at the end of the World Cup prior to the tournament, Köpke was true to his word; his retirement paved the way for another great German keeper, Oliver Kahn. In total, Köpke played 59 matches for his country.

He retired from goalkeeping at 1. FC Nürnberg at the end of the 2000–01 2. Bundesliga season. He also played at Eintracht Frankfurt to where he transferred to from 1. FC Nürnberg in the summer of 1994, for the amount of €516,200, returning to 1. FC Nürnberg five years later in January 1999 via Olympique Marseille. Up to this day Köpke is still very much involved in German football. He currently is the goalkeeping coach of the South Korea national team. He also acted as an ambassador to the city of Nuremberg, as it prepared for the 2006 FIFA World Cup. In July 2021, he announced that he would leave his position at the national team, following the UEFA Euro 2020.

== Honours ==
=== Player ===
1. FC Nürnberg

- 2. Bundesliga: 2000–01

Germany

- FIFA World Cup: 1990
- UEFA European Championship: 1996; runner-up 1992

Individual

- kicker Bundesliga Team of the Season: 1987–88, 1992–93, 1994–95
- Footballer of the Year in Germany: 1993
- UEFA European Championship Team of the Tournament: 1996
- Best European Goalkeeper: 1996
- IFFHS World's Best Goalkeeper: 1996

=== Goalkeeping coach ===
Germany

- FIFA World Cup: 2014
- FIFA Confederations Cup: 2017
- UEFA Euro runner-up: 2008
- FIFA World Cup third place: 2006; 2010
- FIFA Confederations Cup third place: 2005
