= Best European Goalkeeper =

Annual award given to the best goalkeeper of a season of Champions League

The Best European Goalkeeper award is a football award given annually since 1990 to the most outstanding Goalkeeper in Europe, as voted by the UEFA magazine, in 2009 the ESM become the donor of the award.

From 1998 to 2009 the Best European Goalkeeper was awarded to the same goalkeepers that won the Best Goalkeeper within the UEFA Club Football Awards.

== List of winners ==
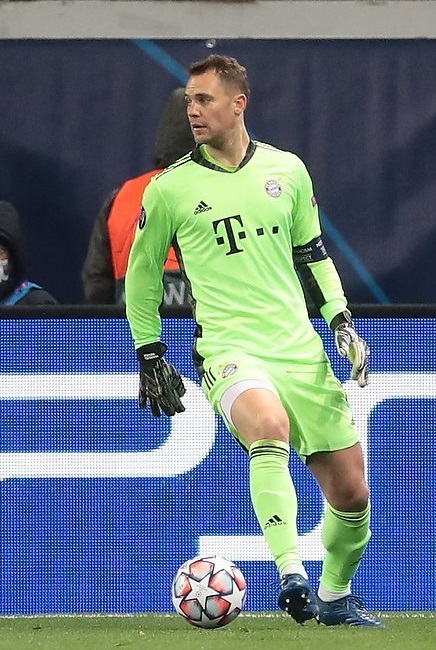
Manuel Neuer has won the award a record five times (2011, 2013 to 2015 and 2020)

- 1990 – (Italy) Walter Zenga
- 1991 – (Germany) Bodo Illgner
- 1992 – (Denmark) Peter Schmeichel
- 1993 – (Denmark) Peter Schmeichel
- 1994 – (Belgium) Michel Preud'homme
- 1995 – (Netherlands) Edwin van der Sar
- 1996 – (Germany) Andreas Köpke
- 1997 – (Germany) Jens Lehmann
- 1998 – (Denmark) Peter Schmeichel
- 1999 – (Germany) Oliver Kahn
- 2000 – (Germany) Oliver Kahn
- 2001 – (Germany) Oliver Kahn
- 2002 – (Germany) Oliver Kahn
- 2003 – (Italy) Gianluigi Buffon
- 2004 – (Portugal) Vítor Baía
- 2005 – (Czech Republic) Petr Čech
- 2006 – (Germany) Jens Lehmann
- 2007 – (Czech Republic) Petr Čech
- 2008 – (Czech Republic) Petr Čech
- 2009 – (Netherlands) Edwin van der Sar
- 2010 – (Spain) Iker Casillas
- 2011 – (Germany) Manuel Neuer
- 2012 – (Czech Republic) Petr Čech
- 2013 – (Germany) Manuel Neuer
- 2014 – (Germany) Manuel Neuer
- 2015 – (Germany) Manuel Neuer
- 2016 – (Italy) Gianluigi Buffon
- 2017 – (Italy) Gianluigi Buffon
- 2018 – (Costa Rica) Keylor Navas
- 2019 – (Brazil) Alisson
- 2020 – (Germany) Manuel Neuer
- 2021 – (Senegal) Édouard Mendy
- 2022 – (Belgium) Thibaut Courtois
- 2023 – (Brazil) Ederson Moraes
- 2024 – (Argentina) Emiliano Martínez

=== Wins by country ===
Country	Players	Total
Germany	5	13
Italy	2	4
Czech Republic	1	4
Denmark	1	3
Brazil	2	2
Netherlands	1	2
Belgium	2	2
Portugal	1	1
Spain	1	1
Costa Rica	1	1
Senegal	1	1
Argentina	1	1

=== Wins by club ===
Club	Players	Total
(Germany) Bayern Munich	2	8
(England) Chelsea	2	5
(England) Manchester United	2	4
(Italy) Juventus	1	3
(Germany) Schalke 04	2	2
(Spain) Real Madrid	2	2
(Germany) 1. FC Köln	1	1
(Belgium) Mechelen	1	1
(Netherlands) Ajax	1	1
(Germany) Eintracht Frankfurt	1	1
(Portugal) Porto	1	1
(England) Arsenal	1	1
(England) Liverpool	1	1
(England) Manchester City	1	1
(England) Aston Villa	1	1

== See also ==
- IFFHS World's Best Goalkeeper
- The Best FIFA Goalkeeper
- UEFA Best Club Goalkeeper Award
