= Albertus Putman Cramer =

Dutch footballer

Hubert Menten
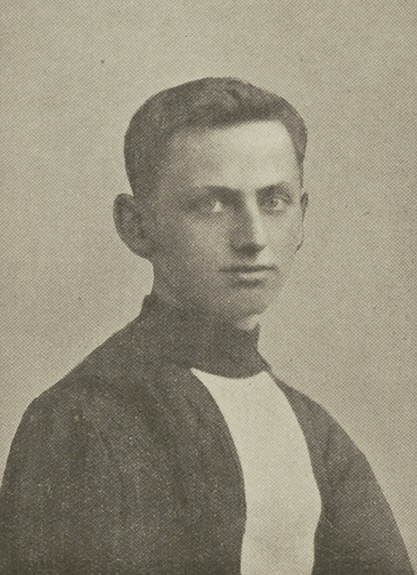
- Albertus Putman Cramer

Personal information
- Full name: Albertus Dithmar Putman Cramer
- Date of birth: 24 July 1877
- Place of birth: Willemstad, North Brabant, Netherlands
- Date of death: 13 March 1947 (aged 69)
- Place of death: Voorburg, Netherlands
- Position: Midfielder

Senior career*
Years	Team	Apps	(Gls)
1893–1899	Koninklijke HFC		

International career
1895–1897	Netherlands unofficial team	3	(0)
- * Club domestic league appearances and goals

Albertus Dithmar Putman Cramer (24 July 1877 – 13 March 1947) was a Dutch footballer who played as a midfielder for Koninklijke HFC and the Netherlands national team (unofficial) in the early 1890s.

== Early life ==
Albertus Putman Cramer was born in Willemstad, North Brabant, on 24 July 1877, as the son of Carel Frederik Herman Putman Cramer and Johanna Catharina Huijsman.

== Playing career ==
=== Club career ===
Together with Pim Mulier, Jacob Willem Schorer, Johan Schröder, Solco Tromp, and Hubert Menten, Cramer was a member of the Koninklijke HFC team that won the first ever cup match in the Netherlands on 11 February 1894, helping his side to a 3–1 win over Haarlem, as well as the 1894–95 Netherlands Football League Championship. After that successful season, a large part of the selection left for the Indies and South Africa, and even though HFC managed to field new players, they could not fully replace the departed footballers, so Putman Cramer was unable to prevent HFC from being relegated in the 1896–97 season.

Putman Cramer excelled in the forward line and on the halfback line, and together with Teunissen and Keus, he formed a great halfback line in 1997–98, which played a crucial role in bringing HFC back to the First Division following a 4–1 win over CFC Celeritas on 11 April in Leiden. In the following season, the newly promoted HFC narrowly escaped relation, and he then retired following a departure to the Dutch East Indies.

=== International career ===
Between 1895 and 1897, Putman Cramer played for the Netherlands in three unofficial matches against English clubs, including a 1–2 loss to Maidstone FC on 31 March 1895, a 2–3 loss to the English Wanderers on 12 April 1896, and a 2–6 loss to the English Wanderers on 28 March 1897.

== Honours ==
Koninklijke HFC

- Dutch Championship:
  - Champions (1): 1894–95
