= Joe van der Sar =

Dutch footballer (born 1998)

Personal information
- Date of birth: 16 March 1998 (age 28)
- Place of birth: Noordwijk, Netherlands
- Height: 1.85 m (6 ft 1 in)
- Position: Goalkeeper

Team information
- Current team: Koninklijke HFC
- Number: 21

Youth career
- 2008–2011: Manchester United
- 2011–2013: Noordwijk
- 2013–2017: Ajax

College career
Years	Team	Apps	(Gls)
2021–2022	Pittsburgh Panthers	22	(0)

Senior career*
Years	Team	Apps	(Gls)
2017–2018	ADO Den Haag	0	(0)
2018–2019	RKC Waalwijk	0	(0)
2019–2021	Noordwijk	0	(0)
2023–	Koninklijke HFC	22	(0)
- * Club domestic league appearances and goals as of 11:15, 24 October 2026 (UTC)

Joe van der Sar (born 16 March 1998) is a Dutch footballer who plays as a goalkeeper for Koninklijke HFC.

== Early life ==
Van der Sar was born in Noordwijk to former Netherlands international goalkeeper Edwin van der Sar and Annemarie van Kesteren. As a child he lived in both Italy and England.

== Club career ==
=== Early career ===
Van der Sar started his career at Manchester United (where his father had been playing at the time) youth academy and Under–13 team. After his father's departure from the club in 2011, the family relocated to the Netherlands, and van der Sar joined the academy of VV Noordwijk. While at Noordwijk, he attracted the attention of another of his father's clubs, Ajax, and after training with the Amsterdam-based team, he impressed enough for the club to inform Noordwijk that they intended to sign him. This move was confirmed by an Ajax spokesperson in April 2013.

After four years with Ajax's youth teams, he fell out of favour with coaches, featuring as understudy to Jeffrey de Lange in his final season with the club. He was deemed surplus to requirements, and left in the summer of 2017, joining ADO Den Haag shortly after his release. He made his unofficial debut shortly after joining, playing forty-five minutes in a friendly against amateur side LVV Lugdunum.

=== Senior career ===
Van der Sar spent one season with ADO Den Haag, featuring six times on the bench without making an appearance in the Eredivisie, before moving to RKC Waalwijk, where he signed an amateur contract. After a season with Waalwijk, again failing to make his debut, he moved to former club VV Noordwijk, who had just been promoted to the Tweede Divisie. In a 2021 interview with ELF Voetbal, he stated that joining the club "felt like coming home" to him, as it was the club his grandfather had supported, and where his father had played at youth level. Ahead of the 2020–21 season, he renewed his contract with the club. While at Noordwijk, he featured in the same squad as his nephew, Daan Hermans.

=== Collegiate soccer ===
In August 2021, having failed to make an appearance for Noordwijk during his two seasons with the club, he moved to the United States, enrolling at the University of Pittsburgh and joining their soccer team, the Pittsburgh Panthers. Having not featured in the 2021 season, he established himself as the team's first-choice goalkeeper the following year, making twenty-two appearances and helping the Panthers to the NCAA Tournament College Cup semi-finals.

=== Return to the Netherlands ===
In September 2023, van der Sar returned to the Netherlands, signing for Koninklijke HFC.

== Career statistics ==
=== Club ===
As of match played 19 November 2023

Appearances and goals by club, season and competition
Club	Season	League			Cup		Other		Total	
Club	Season	Division	Apps	Goals	Apps	Goals	Apps	Goals	Apps	Goals
ADO Den Haag	2017–18	Eredivisie	0	0	0	0	0	0	0	0
RKC Waalwijk	2018–19	Eerste Divisie	0	0	0	0	0	0	0	0
VV Noordwijk	2019–20	Tweede Divisie	0	0	0	0	0	0	0	0
VV Noordwijk	2020–21	Tweede Divisie	0	0	0	0	0	0	0	0
VV Noordwijk	Total		0	0	0	0	0	0	0	0
Koninklijke HFC	2023–24	Tweede Divisie	1	0	0	0	0	0	1	0
Career total			1	0	0	0	0	0	1	0

== Other ==
In January 2026, he played for the Dutch national team in the Kings League.
