= Fons Gemmel =

Dutch footballer (born 2001)

Personal information
- Date of birth: 21 March 2001 (age 25)
- Place of birth: Amsterdam, Netherlands
- Height: 1.70 m (5 ft 7 in)
- Position: Right back

Team information
- Current team: Koninklijke HFC
- Number: 6

Senior career*
Years	Team	Apps	(Gls)
2020–2022	Jong AZ	31	(0)
2022–2025	OFC	1	(0)
2025–2026	Swift		
2026–	Koninklijke HFC	6	(0)
- * Club domestic league appearances and goals as of 11:17, 24 October 2026 (UTC)

Fons Gemmel (born 21 March 2001) is a Dutch professional footballer who plays as a right-back for Tweede Divisie club Koninklijke HFC.

== Club career ==
On 10 May 2020, Gemmel signed his first professional contract with Jong AZ. He made his professional debut with Jong AZ in a 2–1 Eerste Divisie loss to Jong Utrecht on 14 September 2020.

Koninklijke HFC announced Gemmel would join the club from Swift in summer 2026.

== Personal life ==
Born in the Netherlands, Gemmel is of Indonesian descent through his mother.
