= IFFHS World's Best Goalkeeper =

Annual football award

IFFHS World's Best Man Goalkeeper
- Sport: Association football
- Awarded for: Best performing man goalkeeper of the calendar year
- Presented by: International Federation of Football History & Statistics

History
- First award: 1987
- Editions: 39
- First winner: (Belgium) Jean-Marie Pfaff
- Most wins: (Italy) Gianluigi Buffon (Spain) Iker Casillas (Germany) Manuel Neuer (5 awards each)
- Most recent: (Italy) Gianluigi Donnarumma (2nd award)
- Website: iffhs.com/en

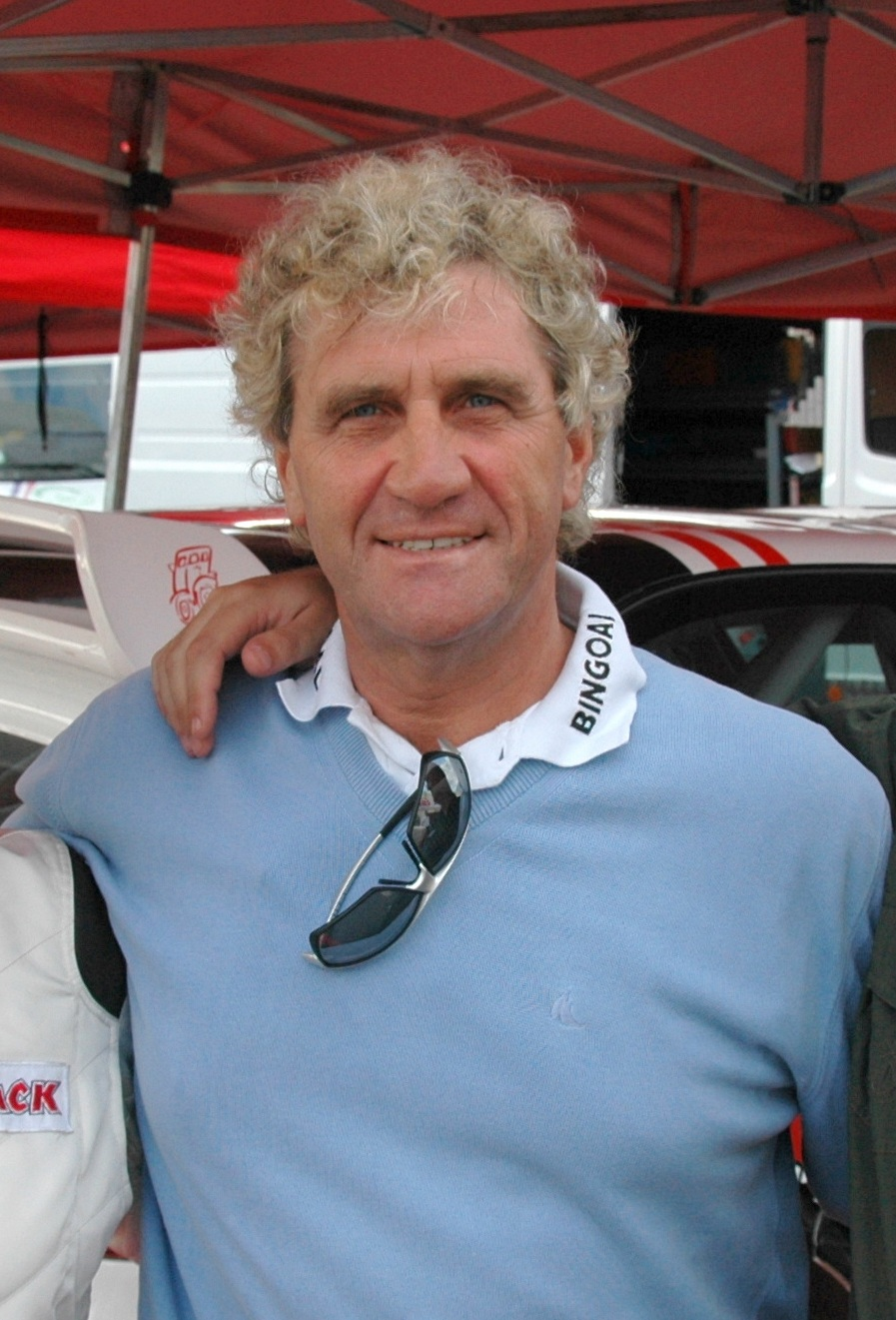
Belgian goalkeeper Jean-Marie Pfaff was the first ever winner of the award, in 1987.

The IFFHS World's Best Goalkeeper is a football award given annually since 1987 to the best goalkeeper of the year as voted by the International Federation of Football History & Statistics (IFFHS). The votes are cast by IFFHS's editorial staff as well as experts from different continents.

The winner is announced at the end of the year. The winning goalkeeper is awarded a gold trophy at the World Football Gala. Italy's Gianluigi Buffon, Spain's Iker Casillas and Germany's Manuel Neuer have each won the award a record five times; Casillas won the award for five consecutive years between 2008 and 2012. Below is a list of the previous winners since the first award in 1987, which was won by Belgium's Jean-Marie Pfaff. Bayern Munich is the team with the most wins, with a total of nine.

== Men's winners ==
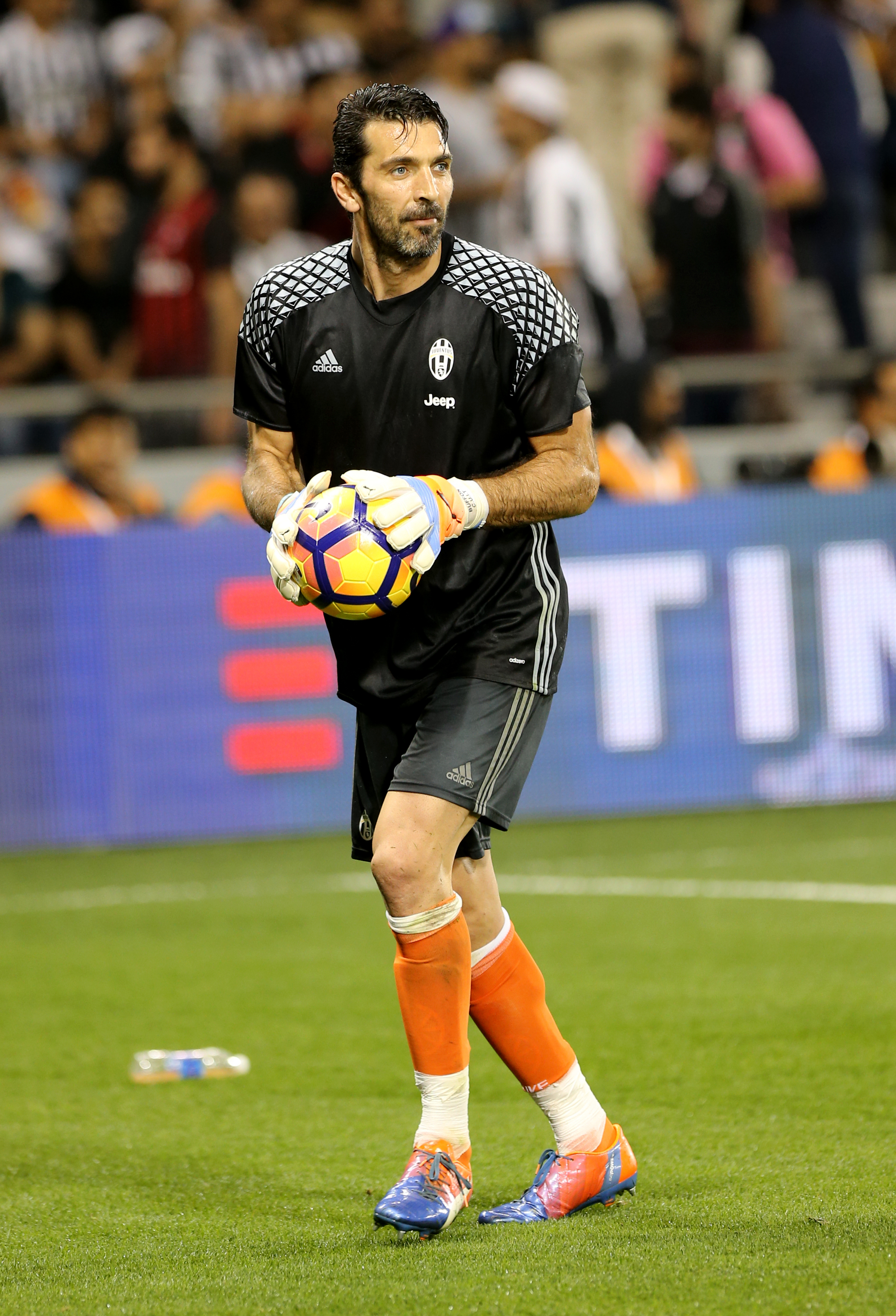
Italian goalkeeper Gianluigi Buffon holds the record for most wins (alongside Manuel Neuer and Iker Casillas).

Gianluigi Buffon has made the top three an unprecedented fourteen times. This includes five wins (joint record with Iker Casillas and Manuel Neuer), six runner-up (record) and three third-placed finishes.

=== List of winners ===
Year	Rank	Player	Club(s)	Points
1987	**1st**	**(Belgium) Jean-Marie Pfaff**	**(Germany) Bayern Munich**	**137**
1987	2nd	(Soviet Union) Rinat Dasayev	(Soviet Union) Spartak Moscow	43
1987	3rd	(Italy) Walter Zenga	(Italy) Inter Milan	30
1988	**1st**	**(Soviet Union) Rinat Dasayev**	**(Soviet Union) Spartak Moscow**	**119**
1988	2nd	(Netherlands) Hans van Breukelen	(Netherlands) PSV Eindhoven	97
1988	3rd	(Italy) Walter Zenga	(Italy) Inter Milan	31
1989	**1st**	**(Italy) Walter Zenga**	**(Italy) Inter Milan**	**79**
1989	2nd	(Belgium) Michel Preud'homme	(Belgium) KV Mechelen	38
1989	3rd	(Soviet Union) Rinat Dasayev	(Spain) Sevilla	33
1990	**1st**	**(Italy) Walter Zenga**	**(Italy) Inter Milan**	**72**
1990	2nd	(Belgium) Michel Preud'homme	(Belgium) KV Mechelen	35
1990	3rd	(Costa Rica) Gabelo Conejo	(Costa Rica) Cartaginés	34
1991	**1st**	**(Italy) Walter Zenga**	**(Italy) Inter Milan**	**51**
1991	2nd	(Argentina) Sergio Goycochea	(Argentina) Racing Club	37
1991	3rd	(Brazil) Cláudio Taffarel	(Italy) Parma	29
1992	**1st**	**(Denmark) Peter Schmeichel**	**(England) Manchester United**	**118**
1992	2nd	(Spain) Andoni Zubizarreta	(Spain) Barcelona	28
1992	3rd	(Netherlands) Hans van Breukelen	(Netherlands) PSV Eindhoven	23
1993	**1st**	**(Denmark) Peter Schmeichel**	**(England) Manchester United**	**84**
1993	2nd	(Argentina) Sergio Goycochea	(Argentina) Racing Club	70
1993	3rd	**(Mexico)** Jorge Campos	**(Mexico)** UNAM	23
1994	**1st**	**(Belgium) Michel Preud'homme**	**(Belgium) KV Mechelen** **(Portugal) Benfica**	**103**
1994	2nd	(Sweden) Thomas Ravelli	(Sweden) IFK Göteborg	73
1994	3rd	(Brazil) Cláudio Taffarel	(Italy) Reggiana	53
1995	**1st**	**(Paraguay) José Luis Chilavert**	**(Argentina) Vélez Sársfield**	**37**
1995	2nd	(Denmark) Peter Schmeichel	(England) Manchester United	29
1995	3rd	(Sweden) Thomas Ravelli	(Sweden) IFK Göteborg	24
1996	**1st**	**(Germany) Andreas Köpke**	**(France) Marseille**	**114**
1996	2nd	(England) David Seaman	(England) Arsenal	101
1996	3rd	(Paraguay) José Luis Chilavert	(Argentina) Vélez Sársfield	44
1997	**1st**	**(Paraguay) José Luis Chilavert**	**(Argentina) Vélez Sársfield**	**61**
1997	2nd	(Italy) Angelo Peruzzi	(Italy) Juventus	57
1997	3rd	(Denmark) Peter Schmeichel	(England) Manchester United	53
1998	**1st**	**(Paraguay) José Luis Chilavert**	**(Argentina) Vélez Sársfield**	**198**
1998	2nd	(France) Fabien Barthez	(France) Monaco	146
1998	3rd	(Netherlands) Edwin van der Sar	(Netherlands) Ajax	75
1999	**1st**	**(Germany) Oliver Kahn**	**(Germany) Bayern Munich**	**116**
1999	2nd	(Denmark) Peter Schmeichel	(England) Manchester United	95
1999	3rd	(Paraguay) José Luis Chilavert	(Argentina) Vélez Sársfield	93
2000	**1st**	**(France) Fabien Barthez**	**(France) Monaco** **(England) Manchester United**	**195**
2000	2nd	(Germany) Oliver Kahn	(Germany) Bayern Munich	133
2000	3rd	(Italy) Francesco Toldo	(Italy) Fiorentina	131
2001	**1st**	**(Germany) Oliver Kahn**	**(Germany) Bayern Munich**	**265**
2001	2nd	(Colombia) Oscar Córdoba	(Argentina) Boca Juniors	77
2001	3rd	(Italy) Gianluigi Buffon	(Italy) Parma (Italy) Juventus	69
2002	**1st**	**(Germany) Oliver Kahn**	**(Germany) Bayern Munich**	**316**
2002	2nd	(Spain) Iker Casillas	(Spain) Real Madrid	101
2002	3rd	(Turkey) Rüştü Reçber	(Turkey) Fenerbahçe	99
2003	**1st**	**(Italy) Gianluigi Buffon**	**(Italy) Juventus**	**186**
2003	2nd	(Spain) Iker Casillas	(Spain) Real Madrid	112
2003	3rd	(Germany) Oliver Kahn	(Germany) Bayern Munich	106
2004	**1st**	**(Italy) Gianluigi Buffon**	**(Italy) Juventus**	**185**
2004	2nd	(Czech Republic) Petr Čech	(France) Rennes (England) Chelsea	125
2004	3rd	(Brazil) Dida	(Italy) Milan	78
2005	**1st**	**(Czech Republic) Petr Čech**	**(England) Chelsea**	**175**
2005	2nd	(Brazil) Dida	(Italy) Milan	91
2005	3rd	(Italy) Gianluigi Buffon	(Italy) Juventus	78
2006	**1st**	**(Italy) Gianluigi Buffon**	**(Italy) Juventus**	**295**
2006	2nd	(Germany) Jens Lehmann	(England) Arsenal	140
2006	3rd	(Czech Republic) Petr Čech	(England) Chelsea	91
2007	**1st**	**(Italy) Gianluigi Buffon**	**(Italy) Juventus**	**209**
2007	2nd	(Czech Republic) Petr Čech	(England) Chelsea	172
2007	3rd	(Spain) Iker Casillas	(Spain) Real Madrid	124
2008	**1st**	**(Spain) Iker Casillas**	**(Spain) Real Madrid**	**249**
2008	2nd	(Italy) Gianluigi Buffon	(Italy) Juventus	170
2008	3rd	(Netherlands) Edwin van der Sar	(England) Manchester United	143
2009	**1st**	**(Spain) Iker Casillas**	**(Spain) Real Madrid**	**230**
2009	2nd	(Italy) Gianluigi Buffon	(Italy) Juventus	150
2009	3rd	(Brazil) Júlio César	(Italy) Inter Milan	124
2010	**1st**	**(Spain) Iker Casillas**	**(Spain) Real Madrid**	**304**
2010	2nd	(Brazil) Júlio César	(Italy) Inter Milan	124
2010	3rd	(Czech Republic) Petr Čech	(England) Chelsea	56
2011	**1st**	**(Spain) Iker Casillas**	**(Spain) Real Madrid**	**248**
2011	2nd	(Germany) Manuel Neuer	(Germany) Schalke 04 (Germany) Bayern Munich	130
2011	3rd	**(Spain)** Víctor Valdés	(Spain) Barcelona	114
2012	**1st**	**(Spain) Iker Casillas**	**(Spain) Real Madrid**	**224**
2012	2nd	(Italy) Gianluigi Buffon	(Italy) Juventus	128
2012	3rd	(Czech Republic) Petr Čech	(England) Chelsea	92
2013	**1st**	**(Germany) Manuel Neuer**	**(Germany) Bayern Munich**	**211**
2013	2nd	(Italy) Gianluigi Buffon	(Italy) Juventus	78
2013	3rd	(Czech Republic) Petr Čech	(England) Chelsea	64
2014	**1st**	**(Germany) Manuel Neuer**	**(Germany) Bayern Munich**	**216**
2014	2nd	(Belgium) Thibaut Courtois	(Spain) Atlético Madrid (England) Chelsea	96
2014	3rd	(Costa Rica) Keylor Navas	(Spain) Levante (Spain) Real Madrid	46
2015	**1st**	**(Germany) Manuel Neuer**	**(Germany) Bayern Munich**	**188**
2015	2nd	(Italy) Gianluigi Buffon	(Italy) Juventus	78
2015	3rd	(Chile) Claudio Bravo	(Spain) Barcelona	45
2016	**1st**	**(Germany) Manuel Neuer**	**(Germany) Bayern Munich**	**156**
2016	2nd	(Italy) Gianluigi Buffon	(Italy) Juventus	91
2016	3rd	**(Portugal)** Rui Patrício	**(Portugal)** Sporting CP	50
2017	**1st**	**(Italy) Gianluigi Buffon**	**(Italy) Juventus**	**251**
2017	2nd	(Germany) Manuel Neuer	(Germany) Bayern Munich	103
2017	3rd	(Costa Rica) Keylor Navas	(Spain) Real Madrid	85
2018	**1st**	**(Belgium) Thibaut Courtois**	**(England) Chelsea** **(Spain) Real Madrid**	**181**
2018	2nd	(France) Hugo Lloris	(England) Tottenham Hotspur	109
2018	3rd	(Italy) Gianluigi Buffon	(Italy) Juventus (France) Paris Saint-Germain	59
2019	**1st**	**(Brazil) Alisson**	**(England) Liverpool**	**386**
2019	2nd	(Germany) Marc-André ter Stegen	(Spain) Barcelona	104
2019	3rd	(Slovenia) Jan Oblak	(Spain) Atlético Madrid	67
2020	**1st**	**(Germany) Manuel Neuer**	**(Germany) Bayern Munich**	**320**
2020	2nd	(Slovenia) Jan Oblak	(Spain) Atlético Madrid	40
2020	3rd	(Brazil) Alisson	(England) Liverpool	30
2021	**1st**	**(Italy) Gianluigi Donnarumma**	**(Italy) Milan** **(France) Paris Saint-Germain**	**170**
2021	2nd	(Germany) Manuel Neuer	(Germany) Bayern Munich	75
2021	3rd	(Senegal) Édouard Mendy	(England) Chelsea	40
2022	**1st**	**(Belgium) Thibaut Courtois**	**(Spain) Real Madrid**	**125**
2022	2nd	(Argentina) Emiliano Martínez	(England) Aston Villa	110
2022	3rd	(Morocco) Yassine Bounou	(Spain) Sevilla	55
2023	**1st**	**(Brazil) Ederson**	**(England) Manchester City**	**145**
2023	2nd	(Argentina) Emiliano Martínez	(England) Aston Villa	76
2023	3rd	(Belgium) Thibaut Courtois	(Spain) Real Madrid	73
2024	**1st**	**(Argentina) Emiliano Martínez**	**(England) Aston Villa**	**167**
2024	2nd	(Spain) Unai Simón	(Spain) Athletic Bilbao	91
2024	3rd	(Georgia (country)) Giorgi Mamardashvili	(Spain) Valencia	55
2025	**1st**	**(Italy) Gianluigi Donnarumma**	**(France) Paris Saint-Germain** **(England) Manchester City**	**169**
2025	2nd	(Belgium) Thibaut Courtois	(Spain) Real Madrid	65
2025	3rd	(Switzerland) Yann Sommer	(Italy) Inter Milan	59

=== Statistics ===
Winners (1987–present)
Player	Wins	Years
(Italy) Gianluigi Buffon	5	2003, 2004, 2006, 2007, 2017
(Spain) Iker Casillas	5	2008, 2009, 2010, 2011, 2012
(Germany) Manuel Neuer	5	2013, 2014, 2015, 2016, 2020
(Italy) Walter Zenga	3	1989, 1990, 1991
(Paraguay) José Luis Chilavert	3	1995, 1997, 1998
(Germany) Oliver Kahn	3	1999, 2001, 2002
(Denmark) Peter Schmeichel	2	1992, 1993
(Belgium) Thibaut Courtois	2	2018, 2022
(Italy) Gianluigi Donnarumma	2	2021, 2025
(Belgium) Jean-Marie Pfaff	1	1987
(Soviet Union) Rinat Dasayev	1	1988
(Belgium) Michel Preud'homme	1	1994
(Germany) Andreas Köpke	1	1996
(France) Fabien Barthez	1	2000
(Czech Republic) Petr Čech	1	2005
(Brazil) Alisson	1	2019
(Brazil) Ederson	1	2023
(Argentina) Emiliano Martínez	1	2024

Wins by club
Club	Total	Players
(Germany) Bayern Munich	9	3
(Spain) Real Madrid	7	2
(Italy) Juventus	5	1
(England) Manchester United	3	2
(Italy) Inter Milan	3	1
(Argentina) Vélez Sársfield	3	1
(England) Chelsea	2	2
(England) Manchester City	2	2
(France) Paris Saint-Germain	2	1
(England) Aston Villa	1	1
(Portugal) Benfica	1	1
(Belgium) KV Mechelen	1	1
(England) Liverpool	1	1
(France) Marseille	1	1
(Italy) Milan	1	1
(France) Monaco	1	1
(Soviet Union) Spartak Moscow	1	1

Wins by nationality
Nationality	Total	Players
Italy	10	3
Germany	9	3
Spain	5	1
Belgium	4	3
Paraguay	3	1
Brazil	2	2
Denmark	2	1
Argentina	1	1
Czech Republic	1	1
France	1	1
Soviet Union	1	1

=== Continental winners ===
Bold indicates the World's Best Man Goalkeeper winner.

Year	Confederation	Winner	Club(s)
2021	**UEFA**	**(Italy) Gianluigi Donnarumma**	**(Italy) Milan** **(France) Paris Saint-Germain**
2021	CONMEBOL	(Argentina) Emiliano Martínez	(England) Aston Villa
2021	CONCACAF	(Mexico) Guillermo Ochoa	(Mexico) América
2021	CAF	(Senegal) Édouard Mendy	(England) Chelsea
2021	AFC	(Australia) Mathew Ryan	(Spain) Real Sociedad
2021	OFC	(New Zealand) Oliver Sail	(New Zealand) Wellington Phoenix

=== Men's historical all-time World Best Goalkeepers top 10 ===
As of 16 May 2025

Top 10 players
Rank	Player	Nation
**1**	**Lev Yashin**	**Soviet Union**
2	Gianluigi Buffon	Italy
3	Manuel Neuer	Germany
4	Iker Casillas	Spain
5	Gordon Banks	England
6	Petr Čech	Czech Republic
7	Dino Zoff	Italy
8	Sepp Maier	West Germany
9	Ricardo Zamora	Spain
10	Oliver Kahn	Germany

=== All-time World's Best Goalkeeper ranking (since 1987) ===
As of 30 March 2023

Top 10 players
Rank	Player	Nation	Points
**1**	**Gianluigi Buffon**	**Italy**	**357**
2	Iker Casillas	Spain	260
3	Manuel Neuer	Germany	219
4	Petr Čech	Czech Republic	218
5	Edwin van der Sar	Netherlands	201
6	Peter Schmeichel	Denmark	179
7	Oliver Kahn	Germany	162
8	Thibaut Courtois	Belgium	150
9	José Luis Chilavert	Paraguay	146
10	Walter Zenga	Italy	132

=== The World's Best Male Goalkeeper of the Century (1901–2000) ===
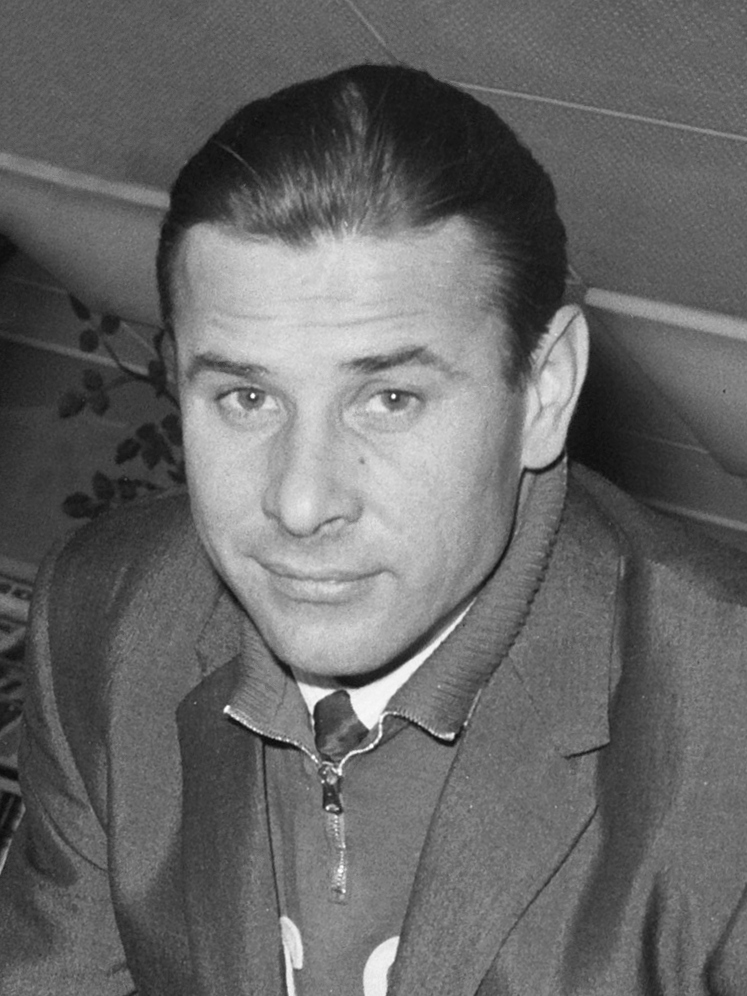
At the end of the 20th Century, Soviet goalkeeper Lev Yashin was named World's Goalkeeper of the Century by IFFHS.

At the end of the 20th century, the IFFHS also voted on the World's Goalkeeper of the Century, won by the Soviet Union's Lev Yashin running ahead of Gordon Banks and Dino Zoff.

Top 10 players
Rank	Player	Nation	Period	Points
**1**	**Lev Yashin**	**Soviet Union**	**1950–1970**	**1002**
2	Gordon Banks	England	1963–1972	717
3	Dino Zoff	Italy	1968–1983	661
4	Sepp Maier	West Germany	1966–1979	456
5	Ricardo Zamora	Spain	1920–1936	443
6	José Luis Chilavert	Paraguay	1989–2003	373
7	Peter Schmeichel	Denmark	1987–2001	291
8	Peter Shilton	England	1970–1990	196
9	František Plánička	Czechoslovakia	1926–1938	194
10	Amadeo Carrizo	Argentina	1954–1964	192

=== The World's Best Male Goalkeeper of the Decade (2001–2010) ===
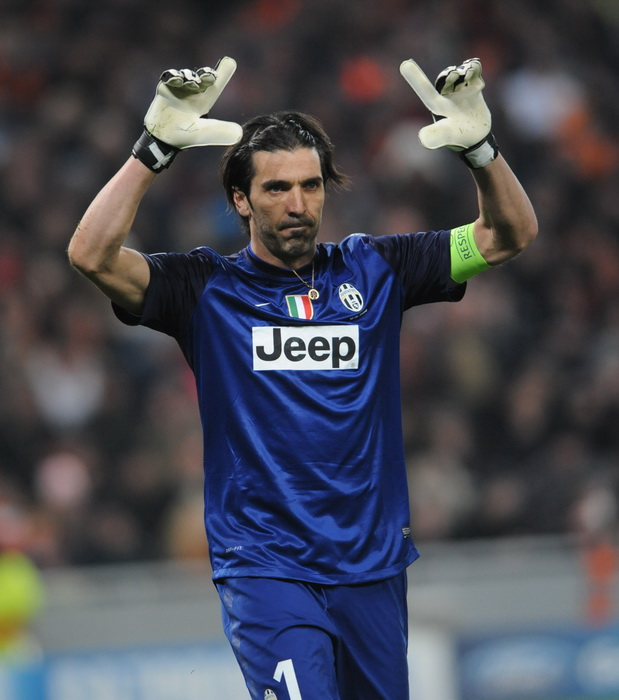
In 2011, Italian goalkeeper Gianluigi Buffon was named World's Best Goalkeeper of the 21st Century's first decade by IFFHS; in 2012, he was named World's Best Goalkeeper of the Past 25 Years. He also holds the record for most IFFHS Goalkeeper of the Year Award victories, alongside Iker Casillas and Manuel Neuer, with five.

In 2011, the IFFHS also voted on The World's Best Goalkeeper of the 21st Century's first decade, taking into consideration goalkeepers' performances during the first decade of the 21st century, between 2001 and 2011; the award was won by the Italy's Gianluigi Buffon running ahead of Iker Casillas and Petr Čech.

Top 20 players
Rank	Player	Nation	Points
**1**	**Gianluigi Buffon**	**Italy**	**199**
2	Iker Casillas	Spain	197
3	Petr Čech	Czech Republic	154
4	Edwin van der Sar	Netherlands	116
5	Oliver Kahn	Germany	99
6	Dida	Brazil	90
7	Víctor Valdés	Spain	82
8	Júlio César	Brazil	76
9	Jens Lehmann	Germany	72
10	Roberto Abbondanzieri	Argentina	68
**11**	**Fabien Barthez**	**France**	**55**
**12**	**José Manuel Reina**	**Spain**	**54**
**13**	**Rogério Ceni**	**Brazil**	**53**
**14**	**Francesco Toldo**	**Italy**	**52**
**15**	**Igor Akinfeev**	**Russia**	**47**
**16**	**Jerzy Dudek**	**Poland**	**42**
**17**	**Tim Howard**	**United States**	**36**
**17**	**Manuel Neuer**	**Germany**	**36**
**19**	**Santiago Cañizares**	**Spain**	**35**
**20**	**Justo Villar**	**Paraguay**	**34**

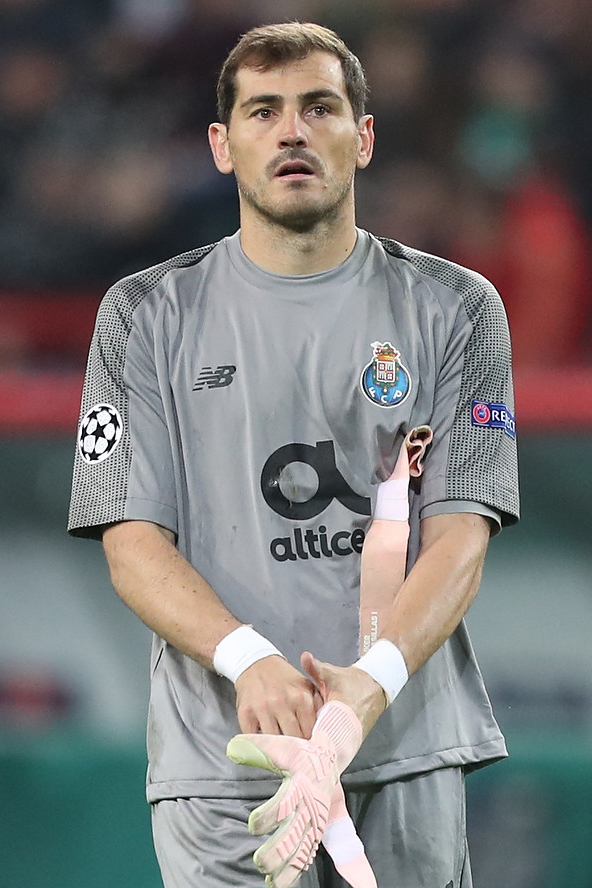
Iker Casillas ranked second in both rankings.

=== The World's Best Male Goalkeeper of the Past 25 Years: 1987–2012 ===
In 2012, the IFFHS also voted on The World's Best Goalkeeper of the past 25 years, taking into consideration goalkeepers' performances between 1987 – the year of the award's inception – and 2012; the award was won by the Italy's Gianluigi Buffon running ahead of Iker Casillas and Edwin van der Sar.

Rank	Player	Nation	Points
**1**	**Gianluigi Buffon**	**Italy**	**226**
2	Iker Casillas	Spain	213
3	Edwin van der Sar	Netherlands	201
4	Peter Schmeichel	Denmark	179
5	Oliver Kahn	Germany	162
6	Petr Čech	Czech Republic	154
7	José Luis Chilavert	Paraguay	146
8	Walter Zenga	Italy	132
9	Andoni Zubizarreta	Spain	132
10	Claudio Taffarel	Brazil	130

=== The World's Best Male Goalkeeper of the Decade (2011–2020) ===
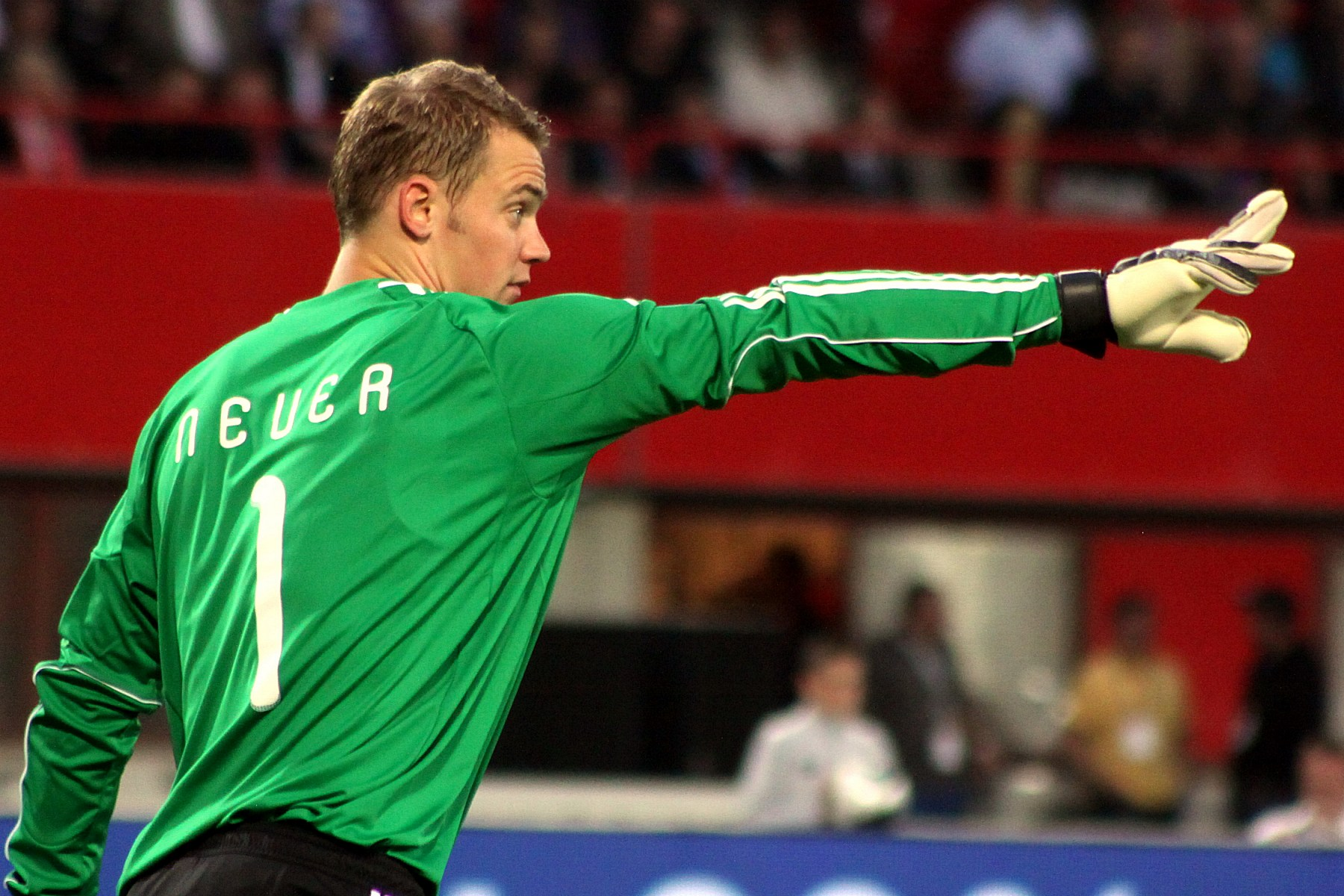
In 2021, German goalkeeper Manuel Neuer was named The World's Best Goalkeeper of the Decade of the 2010s by IFFHS. He also holds the record for most IFFHS Goalkeeper of the Year Award victories, alongside Iker Casillas and Gianluigi Buffon, with five.

In 2021, the IFFHS voted on The World's Best Goalkeeper of the Decade 2011–2020, taking into consideration goalkeepers' performances during 2011–2020; the award was won by Manuel Neuer running ahead of Gianluigi Buffon and Thibaut Courtois.

Top 20 players
Rank	Player	Nation	Points
**1**	**Manuel Neuer**	**Germany**	**183**
2	Gianluigi Buffon	Italy	148
3	Thibaut Courtois	Belgium	130
4	Hugo Lloris	France	96
5	Keylor Navas	Costa Rica	93
6	Jan Oblak	Slovenia	85
7	Petr Čech	Czech Republic	80
8	Marc-André ter Stegen	Germany	78
9	David de Gea	Spain	75
10	Iker Casillas	Spain	67
**11**	**Claudio Bravo**	**Chile**	**51**
**12**	**Alisson**	**Brazil**	**43**
**13**	**Víctor Valdés**	**Spain**	**49**
**14**	**Samir Handanovič**	**Slovenia**	**39**
**15**	**Joe Hart**	**England**	**30**
**16**	**Danijel Subašić**	**Croatia**	**23**
**17**	**Rui Patrício**	**Portugal**	**18**
**18**	**Fernando Muslera**	**Uruguay**	**15**
**19**	**Sergio Romero**	**Argentina**	**15**
**20**	**Ederson**	**Brazil**	**15**

== Women's winners ==
IFFHS World's Best Woman Goalkeeper
- Sport: Association football
- Awarded for: Best performing woman goalkeeper of the calendar year
- Presented by: International Federation of Football History & Statistics

History
- First award: 2012
- Editions: 14
- First winner: (United States) Hope Solo
- Most wins: (France) Sarah Bouhaddi (United States) Hope Solo (4 awards each)
- Most recent: (England) Hannah Hampton (1st award)
- Website: iffhs.com/en

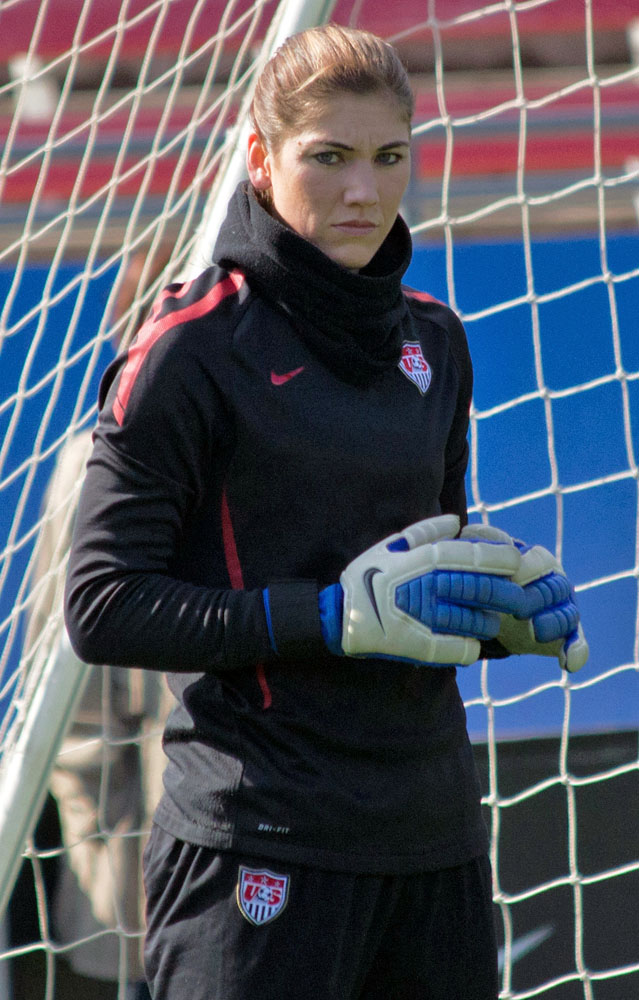
American goalkeeper Hope Solo won the award four times in a row (once ex æquo with Almuth Schult).

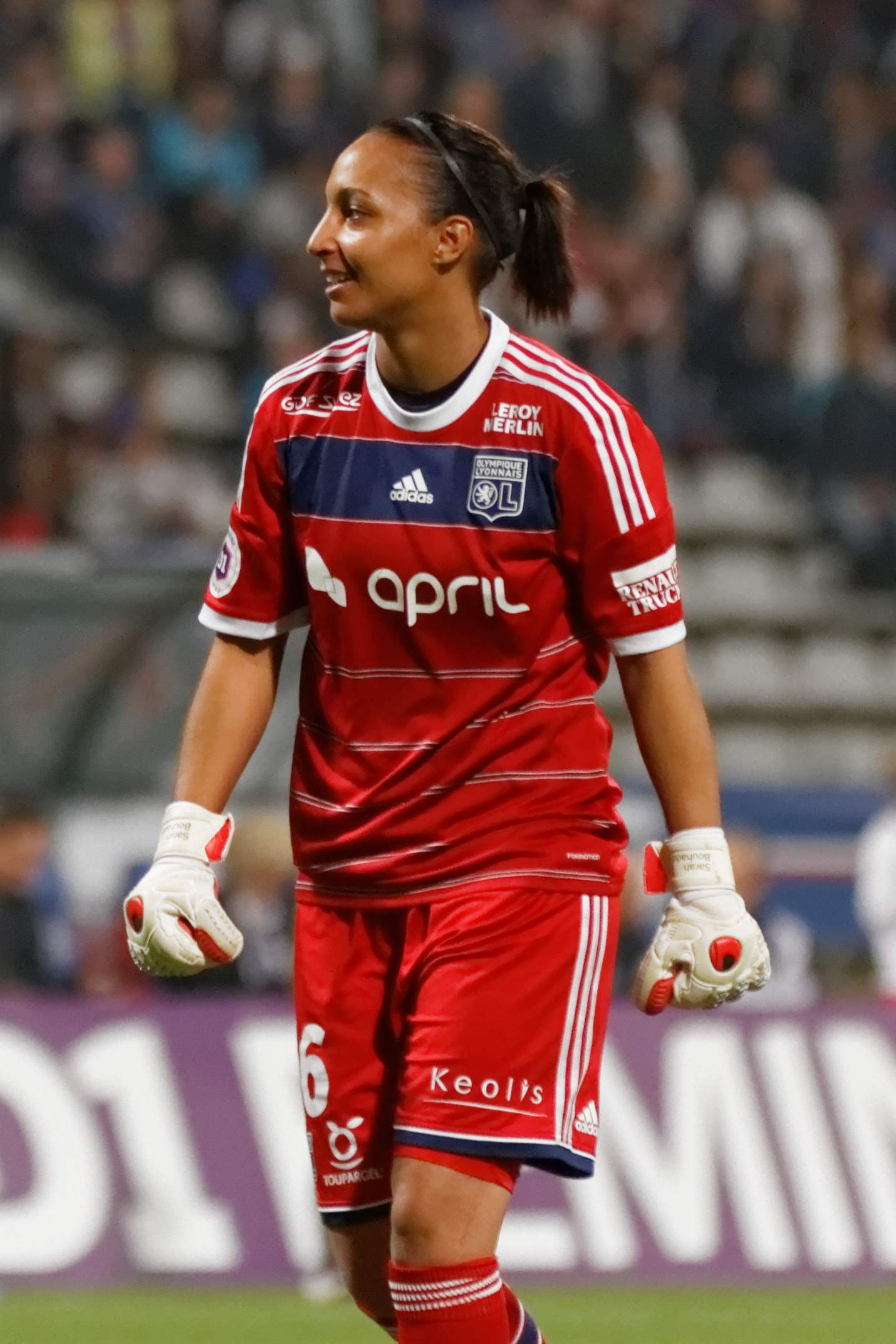
French goalkeeper Sarah Bouhaddi holds the record for most wins (alongside Hope Solo).

=== List of winners ===
Year	Rank	Player	Club(s)	Points
2012	**1st**	**(United States) Hope Solo**	**(United States) Seattle Sounders**	**110**
2012	2nd	**(Germany)** Nadine Angerer	**(Germany)** Eintracht Frankfurt	80
2012	3rd	**(Sweden)** Hedvig Lindahl	**(Sweden)** Kristianstads	35
2013	**1st**	**(United States) Hope Solo**	**(United States) Seattle Reign**	**110**
2013	2nd	**(Germany)** Nadine Angerer	**(Australia)** Brisbane Roar **(Germany)** Eintracht Frankfurt	106
2013	3rd	**(Denmark)** Stina Lykke Borg	**(Germany)** FCR Duisburg	42
2014	**1st**	**(United States) Hope Solo** **(Germany) Almuth Schult**	**(United States) Seattle Reign** **(Germany) VfL Wolfsburg**	**110**
2014	2nd	–		
2014	3rd	**(Germany)** Nadine Angerer	**(Australia)** Brisbane Roar **(United States)** Portland Thorns	45
2015	**1st**	**(United States) Hope Solo**	**(United States) Seattle Reign**	**148**
2015	2nd	**(Germany)** Nadine Angerer	**(United States)** Portland Thorns	66
2015	3rd	**(Japan)** Ayumi Kaihori	**(Japan)** INAC Kobe Leonessa	36
2016	**1st**	**(France) Sarah Bouhaddi**	**(France) Lyon**	**111**
2016	2nd	(Germany) Almuth Schult	(Germany) VfL Wolfsburg	82
2016	3rd	(United States) Hope Solo	(United States) Seattle Reign	77
2017	**1st**	**(France) Sarah Bouhaddi**	**(France) Lyon**	**190**
2017	2nd	(Netherlands) Sari van Veenendaal	(England) Arsenal	112
2017	3rd	**(Poland)** Katarzyna Kiedrzynek	**(France)** Paris Saint-Germain	42
2018	**1st**	**(France) Sarah Bouhaddi**	**(France) Lyon**	**185**
2018	2nd	(Germany) Almuth Schult	(Germany) VfL Wolfsburg	121
2018	3rd	(United States) Ashlyn Harris	(United States) Orlando Pride	48
2019	**1st**	**(Netherlands) Sari van Veenendaal**	**(England) Arsenal** **(Spain) Atlético Madrid**	**185**
2019	2nd	(France) Sarah Bouhaddi	(France) Lyon	92
2019	3rd	(United States) Alyssa Naeher	(United States) Chicago Red Stars	82
2020	**1st**	**(France) Sarah Bouhaddi**	**(France) Lyon**	**220**
2020	2nd	**(Chile)** Christiane Endler	**(France)** Paris Saint-Germain	55
2020	3rd	**(Germany)** Ann Katrin Berger	**(England)** Chelsea	25
2021	**1st**	**(Chile) Christiane Endler**	**(France) Paris Saint-Germain** **(France) Lyon**	**110**
2021	2nd	(Spain) Sandra Paños	(Spain) Barcelona	100
2021	3rd	(Canada) Stephanie Labbé	(Sweden) FC Rosengård (France) Paris Saint-Germain	45
2022	**1st**	**(Chile) Christiane Endler**	**(France) Lyon**	**105**
2022	2nd	(England) Mary Earps	(England) Manchester United	50
2022	3rd	(Germany) Merle Frohms	(Germany) VfL Wolfsburg	25
2023	**1st**	**(England) Mary Earps**	**(England) Manchester United**	**164**
2023	2nd	(Spain) Sandra Paños	(Spain) Barcelona	78
2023	3rd	(Sweden) Zećira Mušović	(England) Chelsea	49
2024	**1st**	**(United States) Alyssa Naeher**	**(United States) Chicago Red Stars**	**109**
2024	2nd	(Spain) Cata Coll	(Spain) Barcelona	96
2024	3rd	(England) Mary Earps	(England) Manchester United (France) Paris Saint-Germain	91
2025	**1st**	**(England) Hannah Hampton**	**(England) Chelsea**	**149**
2025	2nd	(Spain) Cata Coll	(Spain) Barcelona	128
2025	3rd	(Germany) Ann-Katrin Berger	(United States) Gotham FC	58

=== Statistics ===
Winners (2012–present)
Player	Wins	Years
(United States) Hope Solo	4	2012, 2013, 2014, 2015
(France) Sarah Bouhaddi	4	2016, 2017, 2018, 2020
(Chile) Christiane Endler	2	2021, 2022
(Germany) Almuth Schult	1	2014
(Netherlands) Sari van Veenendaal	1	2019
(England) Mary Earps	1	2023
(United States) Alyssa Naeher	1	2024
(England) Hannah Hampton	1	2025

Wins by club
Club	Total	Players
(France) Lyon	6	2
(United States) OL Reign	4	1
(Germany) VfL Wolfsburg	1	1
(England) Arsenal	1	1
(Spain) Atlético Madrid	1	1
(France) Paris Saint-Germain	1	1
(England) Manchester United	1	1
(United States) Chicago Red Stars	1	1
(England) Chelsea	1	1

Wins by nationality
Nationality	Total	Players
United States	5	2
France	4	1
England	2	2
Chile	2	1
Germany	1	1
Netherlands	1	1

=== Continental winners ===
Bold indicates the World's Best Woman Goalkeeper winner.

Year	Confederation	Winner	Club(s)
2021	UEFA	(Spain) Sandra Paños	(Spain) Barcelona
2021	**CONMEBOL**	**(Chile) Christiane Endler**	**(France) Paris Saint-Germain** **(France) Lyon**
2021	CONCACAF	(Canada) Stephanie Labbé	(Sweden) FC Rosengård (France) Paris Saint-Germain
2021	CAF	**(Nigeria)** Chiamaka Nnadozie	(France) Paris FC
2021	AFC	**(Australia)** Teagan Micah	(Sweden) FC Rosengård
2021	OFC	**(New Zealand)** Victoria Esson	(Norway) Avaldsnes

=== Women's historical all-time World Best Goalkeepers top 10 ===
As of 16 May 2025

Top 10 players
Rank	Player	Nation
**1**	**Hope Solo**	**United States**
2	Briana Scurry	United States
3	Nadine Angerer	Germany
4	Christiane Endler	Chile
5	Bente Nordby	Norway
6	Hedvig Lindahl	Sweden
7	Alyssa Naeher	United States
8	Silke Rottenberg	Germany
9	Gao Hong	China
10	Sarah Bouhaddi	France

=== The World's Best Women Goalkeeper of the Decade (2011–2020) ===
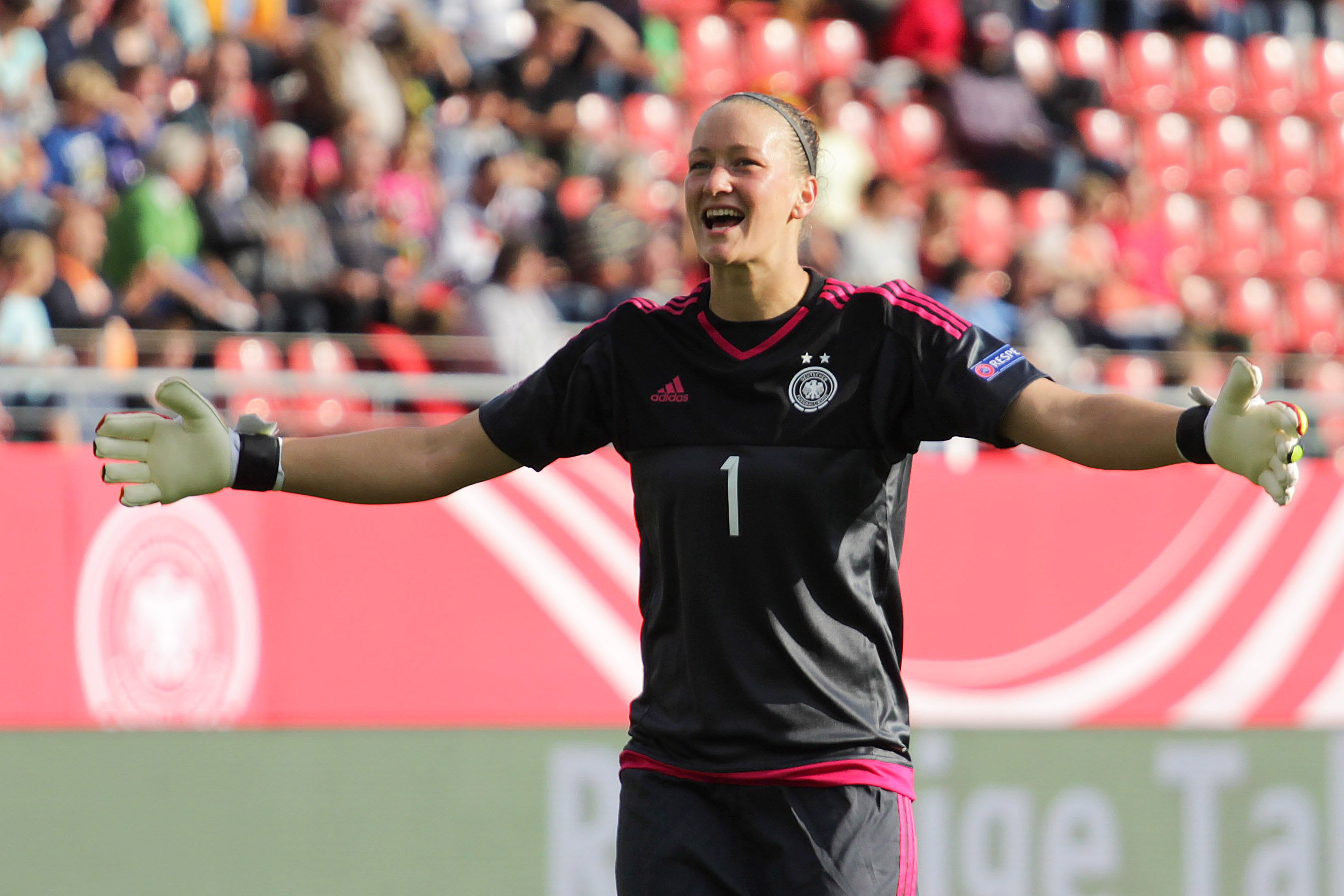
German goalkeeper Almuth Schult was named The World's Best Woman Goalkeeper of the Decade of the 2010s by IFFHS. As part of the German national team, she won the gold medals of the 2013 UEFA Championship and the 2016 Olympic Games.

Top 10 players
Rank	Player	Nation	Points
**1**	**Almuth Schult**	**Germany**	**132**
2	Sarah Bouhaddi	France	115
3	Hope Solo	United States	98
4	Hedvig Lindahl	Sweden	95
5	Nadine Angerer	Germany	75
6	Karen Bardsley	England	75
7	Sari van Veenendaal	Netherlands	69
8	Christiane Endler	Chile	63
9	Sandra Paños	Spain	56
10	Alyssa Naeher	United States	51

== See also ==
- International Federation of Football History & Statistics
- IFFHS World's Best International Goal Scorer
- IFFHS World's Best Top Goal Scorer
- IFFHS World's Best National Coach
- IFFHS World's Best Club Coach
- IFFHS World's Best Player
- IFFHS World's Best Club
- IFFHS World Team
