= Gejus van der Meulen =

Dutch footballer (1903–1972)

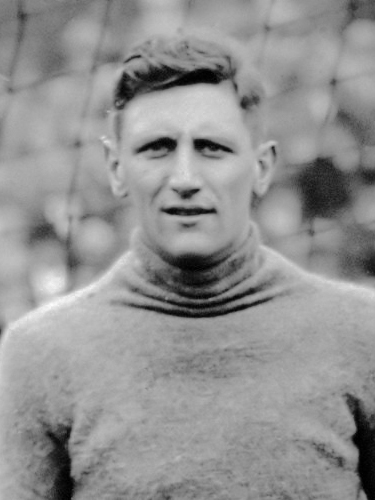
- Van der Meulen in 1928

Personal information
- Full name: Ageaus Yme van der Meulen
- Date of birth: 23 January 1903
- Place of birth: Amsterdam, Netherlands
- Date of death: 10 July 1972 (aged 69)
- Place of death: Haarlem, Netherlands
- Position: Goalkeeper

Senior career*
Years	Team	Apps	(Gls)
1922–1935	HFC		

International career
1924–1934	Netherlands	54	(0)
- * Club domestic league appearances and goals

Ageaus Yme "Gejus" van der Meulen (23 January 1903 – 10 July 1972) was a Dutch football goalkeeper. One of the most popular Dutch sportsmen of the 1920s–1930s, he fell into disgrace in the late 1940s due to his collaboration with Nazi Germany.

== Biography ==
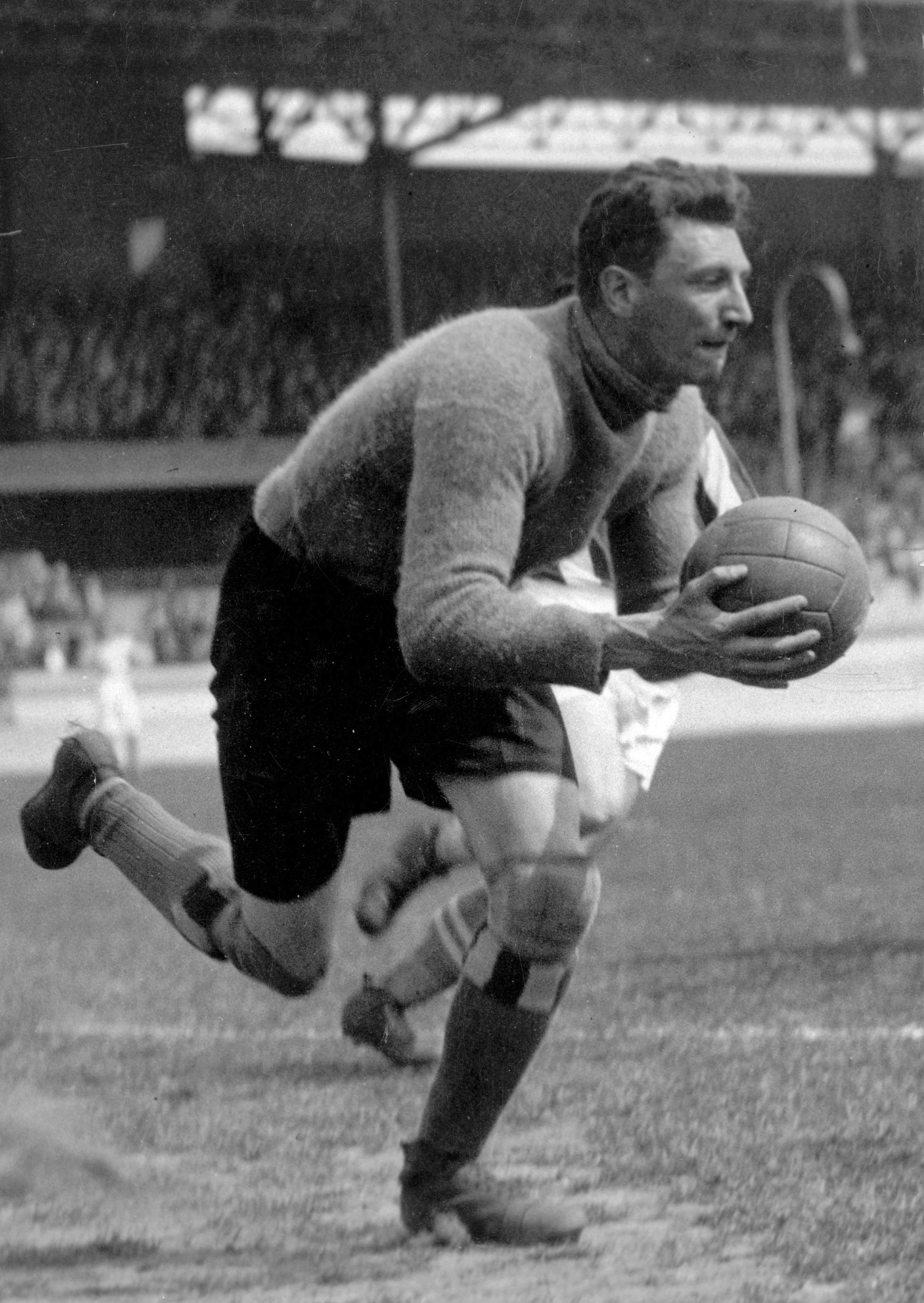
Gejus van der Meulen ca. 1928

Van der Meulen played 54 matches for the Netherlands national football team, which was the Dutch record for goalkeepers from 3 March 1928 (when he equalled the total of Just Göbel) until 21 June 1990 (when his total was surpassed by Hans van Breukelen). He made his debut on 27 April 1924, against Belgium. He played in the 1934 FIFA World Cup, where the Netherlands were eliminated in the first round against Switzerland. He also took part in two Olympic Games, in 1924 and 1928. He was a club player of HFC in Haarlem, the oldest club in the Netherlands.

Van der Meulen's popularity in the Netherlands was such that his wedding made the Polygoon newsreel. Footage also exists of a celebration ceremony for Van der Meulen on 5 March 1933, the day he gained his 50th cap.

In 1935, Van der Meulen retired from competitions and opened a pediatric clinic in Haarlem. He joined the National Socialist Movement in the Netherlands and openly supported Hitler's compulsory sterilization laws. His views were strongly opposed by the parents of the children he treated, forcing him to close his clinic. After the German invasion, Van der Meulen joined the SS and served on the Eastern Front from 1942 onwards. He was arrested four days after the liberation of the Netherlands and tried in June 1947. He showed no remorse and stated that he did not know that the Netherlands was at war with Germany when he joined the SS. Van der Meulen was sentenced to eight years in prison. He was pardoned in August 1949 and opened a new medical clinic, but met a chilly treatment both in the medical and football worlds. His only clients were former Nazi associates, and nobody wanted to talk to him when he went to watch his son play at his former football club.
