= Gertjan Tamerus =

Dutch footballer and manager

- Tamerus in 2007

Personal information
- Full name: Gerardus Johannes Paulus Tamerus
- Date of birth: 11 October 1980 (age 46)
- Place of birth: Haarlem, Netherlands
- Positions: Forward; attacking midfielder

Team information
- Current team: Koninklijke HFC (manager)

Senior career*
Years	Team	Apps	(Gls)
1999–2003	HFC Haarlem	108	(10)
2003–2006	Heracles Almelo	97	(20)
2006–2009	NAC Breda	17	(1)
2009–2010	AO Trikala		
2010–2011	SVZW		
2011–2012	Ter Leede		
2012–2018	Koninklijke HFC	102	(20)

Managerial career
- 2018–: Koninklijke HFC
- * Club domestic league appearances and goals

Gerardus Johannes Paulus "Gertjan" Tamerus (born 11 October 1980) is a Duch former footballer who played as a forward or attacking midfielder. He is the current manager of Dutch Tweede Divisie side Koninklijke HFC.

Tamerus was born in Haarlem and made his debut in professional football for HFC Haarlem in the 1999–2000 season. He also played for Heracles Almelo, NAC Breda, AO Trikala, SVZW and Ter Leede.

== Honours ==
Heracles Almelo

- Eerste Divisie: 2004–05
