= Bodo Illgner =

German footballer

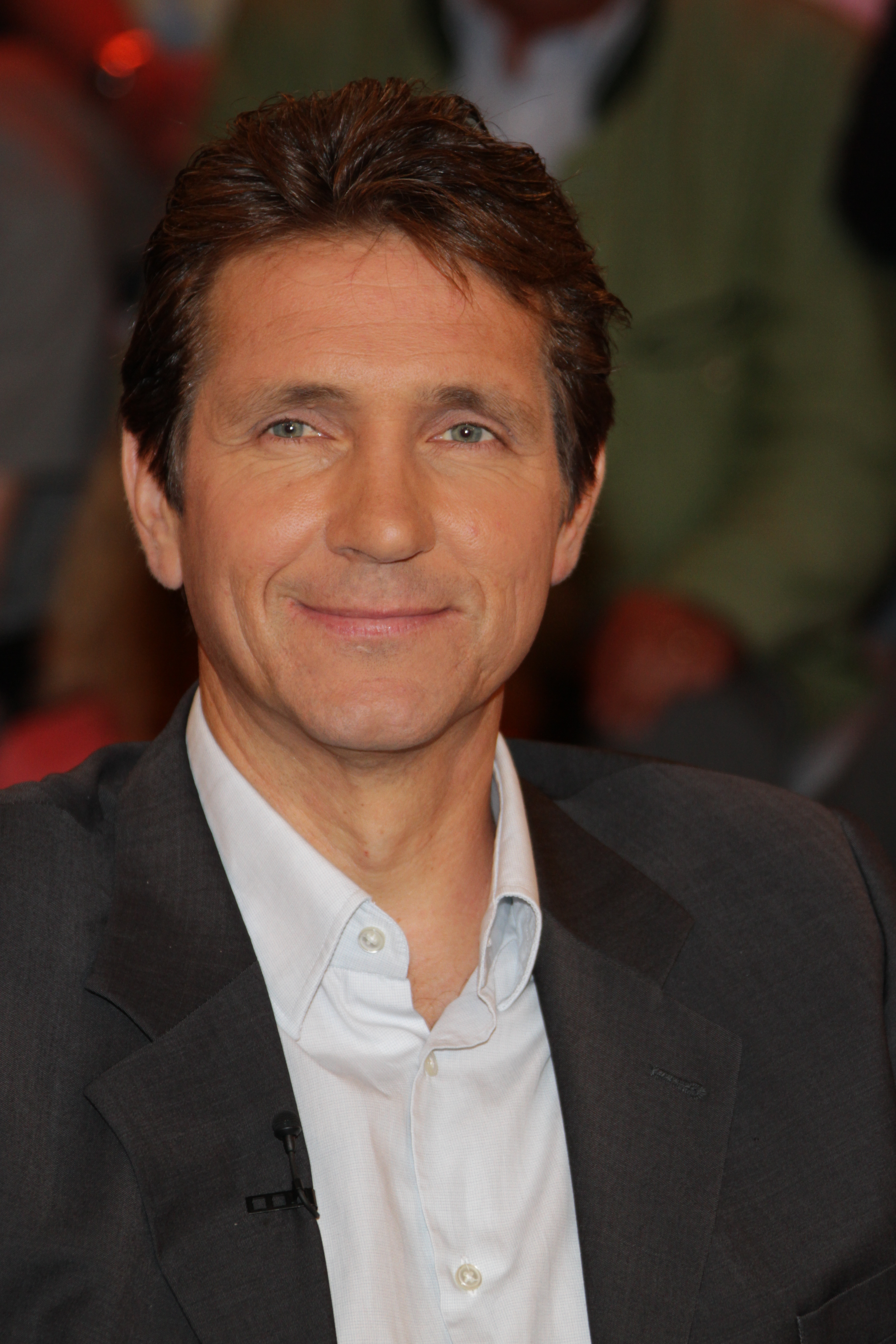
- Illgner in 2012

Personal information
- Date of birth: 7 April 1967 (age 59)
- Place of birth: Koblenz, West Germany
- Height: 1.91 m (6 ft 3 in)
- Position: Goalkeeper

Youth career
- 1973–1983: 1. FC Hardtberg
- 1983–1986: 1. FC Köln

Senior career*
Years	Team	Apps	(Gls)
1986–1996	1. FC Köln	326	(0)
1996–2001	Real Madrid	91	(0)
Total		417	(0)

International career
1985–1987	West Germany U21	7	(0)
1987–1994	Germany	54	(0)
Medal record
Men's football
Representing Germany
FIFA World Cup
Winner	1990 Italy
UEFA European Championship
Runner-up	1992 Sweden
UEFA European Under-16 Championship
Winner	1984 West Germany
- * Club domestic league appearances and goals

Bodo Illgner (German pronunciation: [ˈboːdoː ˈʔɪlɡnɐ]; born 7 April 1967) is a German former professional footballer who played as a goalkeeper. During his career he played for 1. FC Köln and Real Madrid, and helped Germany to the 1990 World Cup, where he became the first goalkeeper to keep a clean sheet in a World Cup final.

== Club career ==
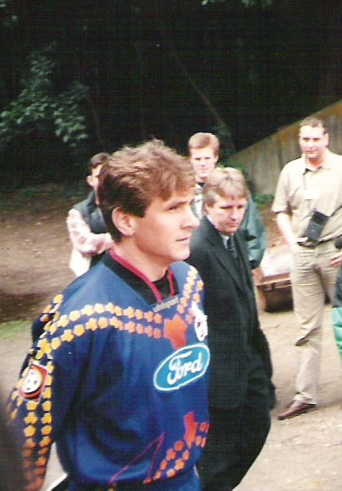
Illgner in 1996

Born in Koblenz, Illgner was a product of 1. FC Köln's youth system, and made his debut in the Bundesliga on 22 February 1986 at not yet 19, in a 3–1 away loss against Bayern Munich. From the 1987–88 season onwards, he became the club's undisputed starter – as successor of Harald Schumacher in both 1. FC Köln and the Germany national team – being voted as Best European Goalkeeper in 1991.

On 30 August 1996, already having started the campaign with Köln, Illgner was signed by Real Madrid, and played 40 La Liga matches in his first year to help the capital side to the national championship conquest. In the following he lost his place to Santiago Cañizares, but regained it in time to play in the final of the UEFA Champions League against Juventus FC (1–0 win).

In 1999–2000, Illgner was succeeded by 18-year-old Iker Casillas, after which he retired from football altogether.

In April 2013, he was named by Marca as a member of the "Best foreign eleven in Real Madrid's history".

== International career ==
On 23 September 1987, Illgner made his debut for the West Germany national team in a 1–0 friendly home win against Denmark, and went on to back Eike Immel during UEFA Euro 1988. At the 1990 FIFA World Cup he, by now the country's first-choice, was in exceptional form, and commanded the backline which consisted of the experienced Klaus Augenthaler, Andreas Brehme, Thomas Berthold, Guido Buchwald and Jürgen Kohler (with Matthias Sammer taking Augenthaler's place at Euro 1992); in the semi-final, he saved a Stuart Pearce shot in the penalty shootout against England, and his team would overcome Argentina in the deciding match, where he would keep a clean sheet in the 1–0 success.

Overall, Illgner appeared 54 times for his country, and also played at the 1994 World Cup, surprisingly retiring after the quarter-final loss against Bulgaria although he was only 27.

== Post-playing career ==
Illgner later went on to work as a pundit for Sky Deutschland and English language broadcasts of beIN Sports.

== Career statistics ==
=== Club ===
Appearances and goals by club, season and competition
Club	Season	League			Cup		Continental		Other		Total	
Club	Season	Division	Apps	Goals	Apps	Goals	Apps	Goals	Apps	Goals	Apps	Goals
1. FC Köln	1985–86	Bundesliga	2	0	0	0	—		—		2	0
1. FC Köln	1986–87	Bundesliga	16	0	0	0	—		—		16	0
1. FC Köln	1987–88	Bundesliga	34	0	2	0	—		—		36	0
1. FC Köln	1988–89	Bundesliga	33	0	2	0	6	0	—		41	0
1. FC Köln	1989–90	Bundesliga	34	0	3	0	10	0	—		47	0
1. FC Köln	1990–91	Bundesliga	34	0	7	0	6	0	—		47	0
1. FC Köln	1991–92	Bundesliga	37	0	2	0	—		—		39	0
1. FC Köln	1992–93	Bundesliga	31	0	2	0	2	0	—		35	0
1. FC Köln	1993–94	Bundesliga	33	0	2	0	—		—		35	0
1. FC Köln	1994–95	Bundesliga	34	0	5	0	—		—		39	0
1. FC Köln	1995–96	Bundesliga	34	0	1	0	5	0	—		40	0
1. FC Köln	1996–97	Bundesliga	4	0	1	0	—		—		5	0
1. FC Köln	Total		326	0	27	0	29	0	—		382	0
Real Madrid	1996–97	La Liga	40	0	6	0	—		—		46	0
Real Madrid	1997–98	La Liga	12	0	2	0	5	0	—		19	0
Real Madrid	1998–99	La Liga	34	0	3	0	8	0	2	0	47	0
Real Madrid	1999–00	La Liga	5	0	1	0	1	0	0	0	7	0
Real Madrid	2000–01	La Liga	0	0	0	0	0	0	0	0	0	0
Real Madrid	Total		91	0	12	0	14	0	2	0	119	0
Career total			417	0	39	0	43	0	2	0	501	0

=== International ===
Appearances and goals by national team and year
National team	Year	Apps	Goals
Germany
Germany	1987	3	0
Germany	1988	3	0
Germany	1989	6	0
Germany	1990	13	0
Germany	1991	7	0
Germany	1992	8	0
Germany	1993	5	0
Germany	1994	9	0
Total		54	0

== Honours ==
Real Madrid

- La Liga: 1996–97
- Supercopa de España: 1997
- UEFA Champions League: 1997–98, 1999–2000
- Intercontinental Cup: 1998

Germany

- FIFA World Cup: 1990
- UEFA European Under-16 Championship: 1984

Individual

- German Goalkeeper of the Year: 1989, 1990, 1991, 1992
- Best European Goalkeeper: 1991
- kicker Bundesliga Team of the Season: 1994–95
