= 1894–95 Netherlands Football League Championship =

Netherl. Football Championship
- Season: 1894–95
- Champions: Koninklijke HFC (3rd title)

The Netherlands Football League Championship 1894–1895 was contested by six teams from the cities Amsterdam, The Hague, Haarlem, Rotterdam and Wageningen. The teams participated in the competition that would later be called Eerste Klasse West. But since the western football district of the Netherlands was the only one to have a competition at the time, it could be regarded as a national championship. This was also the reason that Go Ahead Wageningen participated, as they would later play in the eastern division. Koninklijke HFC won the championship.

== New entrant ==
- Rapiditas Rotterdam

== League standings ==
| Pos | Team | Pld | W | D | L | GF | GA | GD | Pts |
|---|---|---|---|---|---|---|---|---|---|
| 1 | Koninklijke HFC | 10 | 8 | 0 | 2 | 40 | 18 | +22 | 16 |
| 2 | Sparta Rotterdam | 10 | 6 | 1 | 3 | 32 | 18 | +14 | 13 |
| 3 | HVV Den Haag | 10 | 6 | 1 | 3 | 30 | 20 | +10 | 13 |
| 4 | Rapiditas Rotterdam | 10 | 3 | 1 | 6 | 15 | 45 | −30 | 7 |
| 5 | RAP | 10 | 3 | 0 | 7 | 19 | 27 | −8 | 6 |
| 6 | Go Ahead Wageningen | 10 | 2 | 1 | 7 | 22 | 30 | −8 | 5 |

Source: rsssf.com
