= Edwin van der Sar =

Dutch footballer (born 1970)

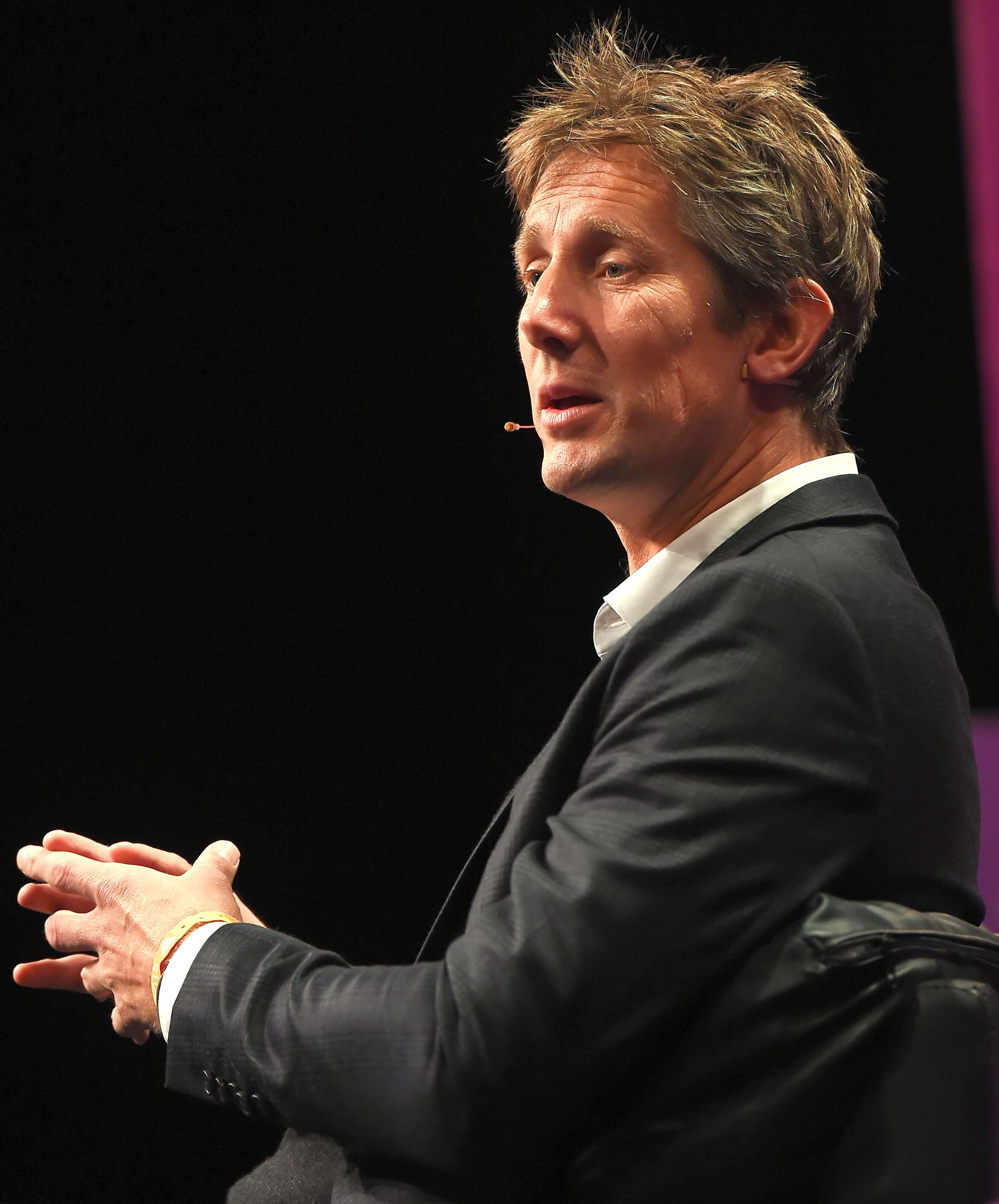
- Van der Sar in 2015

Personal information
- Full name: Edwin van der Sar
- Date of birth: 29 October 1970 (age 56)
- Place of birth: Voorhout, Netherlands
- Height: 1.98 m (6 ft 6 in)
- Position: Goalkeeper

Youth career
- 1980–1985: Foreholte
- 1985–1990: Noordwijk

Senior career*
Years	Team	Apps	(Gls)
1990–1999	Ajax	226	(1)
1999–2001	Juventus	66	(0)
2001–2005	Fulham	127	(0)
2005–2011	Manchester United	186	(0)
2016	Noordwijk	1	(0)
Total		606	(1)

International career
1994–2008	Netherlands	130	(0)
- * Club domestic league appearances and goals

Edwin van der Sar (Dutch pronunciation: [ˈɛtʋɪɱ vɑn dər ˈsɑr]; born 29 October 1970) is a Dutch football executive and former player. Widely regarded as one of the greatest goalkeepers of all time, he was most recently the chief executive of Eredivisie club Ajax.

Van der Sar began his senior playing career with Ajax in the early 1990s; he is considered to be a member of the club's golden generation and was part of the team that won the UEFA Champions League in 1995. In 1999, he left Ajax for Juventus where he spent two years before moving to England, first to Fulham and then to Manchester United in 2005. There he won a second Champions League title in 2008, making him one of just eight players at the time to have won the competition with more than one club. He retired as a professional in 2011, but briefly came out of retirement in 2016 to play a match for Dutch amateur team Noordwijk, for whom he had previously played as a youth.

Van der Sar played 130 times for the Netherlands national team, and was the nation's most-capped player until 2017, when he was overtaken by Wesley Sneijder.

Van der Sar is considered by critics and fellow players as one of the best goalkeepers of all time. He is also one of the most successful footballers ever, having won 26 major trophies in his career, mainly at Ajax and Manchester United. During the 2008–09 season, he set a world record by not conceding a league goal for 1,311 minutes. He is also the oldest player to win the Premier League, having done so in 2011 at the age of 40 years and 205 days. Van der Sar has won several individual awards, including Best European Goalkeeper in 1995 and 2009, and UEFA Club Goalkeeper of the Year in 2009.

== Club career ==
=== Ajax ===
Born in Voorhout, Van der Sar began his career at his hometown club, Foreholte, and then Noordwijk. At a relatively late age, he was brought to the attention of Louis van Gaal, and subsequently signed for Ajax. Even though he joined late he went into the reserve team and bided his time before getting his first-team call-up by Louis van Gaal. He enjoyed a long and successful stint in their senior side, winning the 1991–92 UEFA Cup (albeit only as the reserve, making no appearances in the run) and the 1994–95 UEFA Champions League (by now the starting goalkeeper), as well as the 1995 Best European Goalkeeper award, besides domestic honours. He was in goal for Ajax in the 1996 UEFA Champions League Final, but had to make do with a runner-up medal as they lost the penalty shoot-out against Juventus. He made a total of 226 appearances for Ajax, and scored a penalty for Ajax to complete an 8–1 victory over De Graafschap in the 1997–98 season. In his first full season as Ajax No. 1 he won the Dutch Football Goalkeeper of the Year, he would then go on to retain the award for the next three consecutive years.

=== Juventus ===
In 1999, Van der Sar's stature as one of Europe's top goalkeepers drew attention from Manchester United, who sought a replacement for Peter Schmeichel; however, Van der Sar moved to Italian club Juventus for a fee believed to be in the region of £5 million. He made his debut for The Old Lady in the 1–1 draw with Reggina at the Stadio delle Alpi. He became the first non-Italian to keep goal for the Turin club.

He was the first-choice goalkeeper during his first two seasons in Italy, making 66 Serie A appearances as Juventus finished runners-up in the league twice under Carlo Ancelotti, with the best defensive record in the league on each occasion. He performed well in his first season, winning the 1999 UEFA Intertoto Cup, and helping the club compete for the Serie A title. On the final day of the 1999–2000 season, however, Juventus lost to Perugia, after Van der Sar was beaten by Alessandro Calori's volley; the result allowed Lazio to overtake Juventus and win the league title by a single point. The following season was less successful, however, as Juventus suffered a first-round exit in both the Coppa Italia and the Champions League, while Van der Sar committed several errors, including a high-profile one in a league fixture at home against eventual Serie A champions Roma, on 6 May 2001, when he spilled Hidetoshi Nakata's shot, allowing Vincenzo Montella to tie the game 2–2; Juventus eventually finished two points behind the league champions.

Van der Sar lost his place in the summer of 2001, after the Bianconeri purchased Italian international goalkeeper Gianluigi Buffon from Parma for 100 billion lire (approximately £32.6 million), a world-record fee for a goalkeeper. Unwilling to remain as second-choice behind Buffon, Van der Sar made it clear he wished to move on after two years in Serie A.

=== Fulham ===
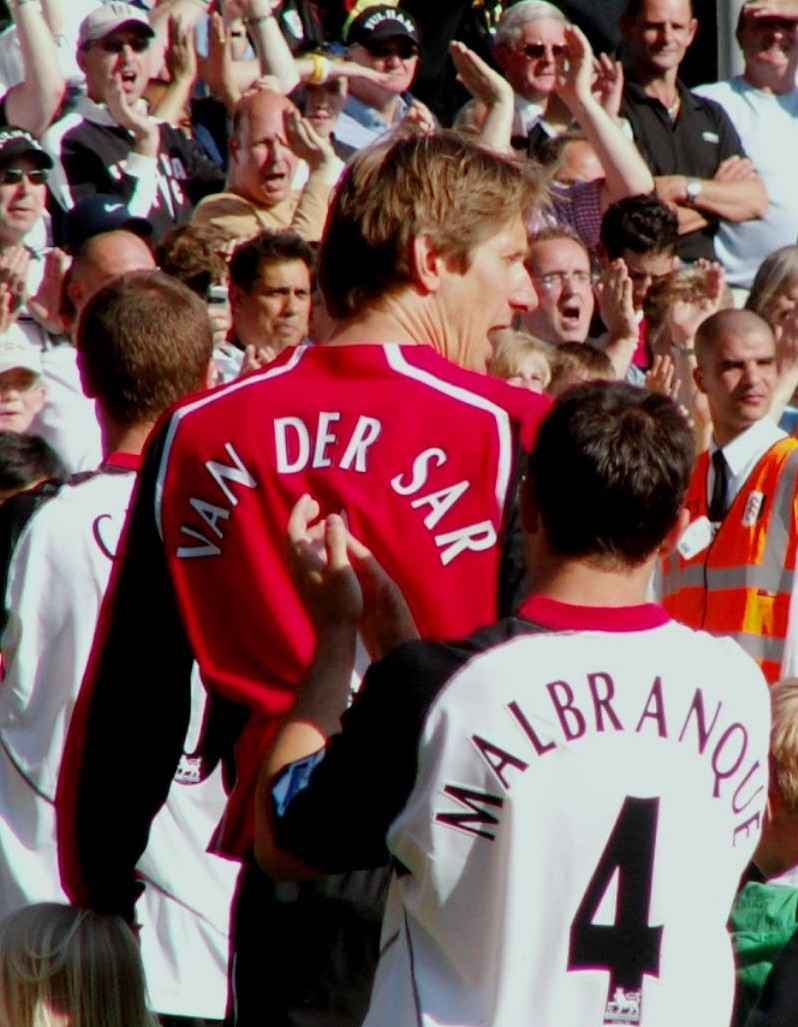
Van der Sar at Fulham

On 1 August 2001, Van der Sar opted to play in England and joined newly promoted Fulham in a shock move worth £7 million, signing a four-year contract. The following day, Van der Sar was officially unveiled by Fulham, and upon his arrival, he described the move as a "nice friendly atmosphere" and that he felt "appreciated". He made his league debut on 18 August 2001 in a 2–3 away defeat against Manchester United. In total, he notched up 127 league appearances while at Fulham. In a game against Aston Villa in his final season at the club, he memorably saved two penalties from Juan Pablo Ángel in a 1–1 draw. His performances for the Cottagers caught the eye of Manchester United and the attention of Sir Alex Ferguson.

=== Manchester United ===
Van der Sar signed for Manchester United on 10 June 2005 for a reported fee of £2 million, although the exact transfer fee was undisclosed. Former Manchester United manager Sir Alex Ferguson considers him the best goalkeeper to have played for the club since Peter Schmeichel.

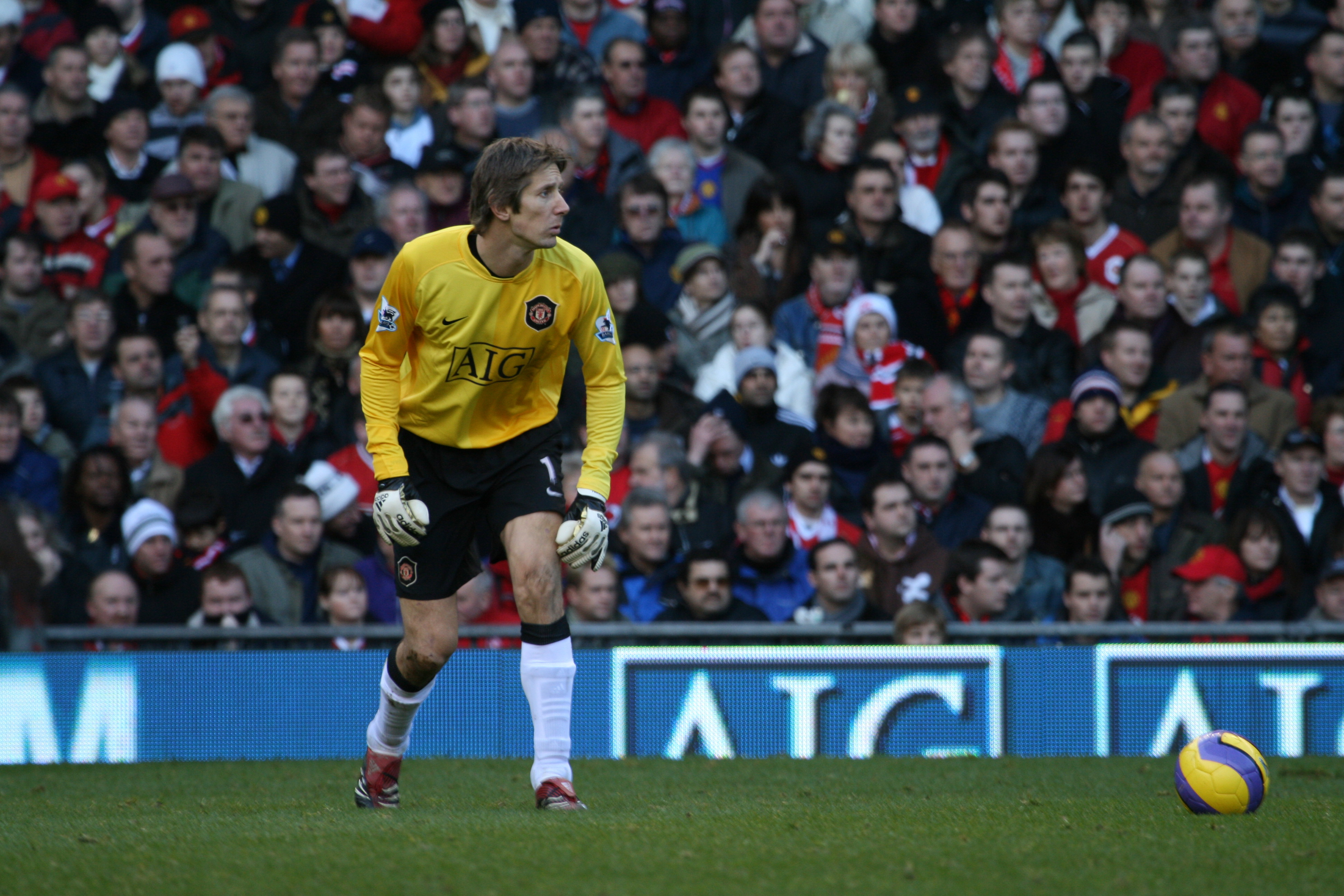
Van der Sar in action for Manchester United

On 5 May 2007, his penalty save from Darius Vassell helped assure a 1–0 triumph over Manchester City in the Manchester derby. The following day, Chelsea's failure to beat Arsenal at the Emirates ensured Manchester United's ninth Premier League trophy and Van der Sar's first. He was also named in the 2006–07 PFA Team of the Year. Three months later, he was a catalyst in Manchester United's 16th FA Community Shield victory, as he saved three consecutive penalties in a shoot-out after Manchester United and Chelsea played to a 1–1 draw at the end of regular time.

The 2007–08 season was Van der Sar's best season since his arrival; he had several great performances despite a niggling groin injury. He would help United secure their second successive Premier League title on the final day and win the Champions League by saving the final penalty of the shoot-out from Nicolas Anelka.

Van der Sar signed a one-year extension to his contract with Manchester United on 12 December 2008, keeping him at the club until at least the end of the 2009–10 season.

On 27 January 2009, Van der Sar helped Manchester United set a new club and Premier League record for consecutive clean sheets – the club's 5–0 win over West Bromwich Albion meant that they had gone 11 games and 1,032 minutes without conceding a goal, beating the previous record of 10 matches and 1,025 minutes set by Petr Čech in the 2004–05 season. He then broke the overall English league record in the club's following game four days later, beating the previous record of 1,103 minutes, set by Steve Death of Reading in 1979. Another clean sheet, against West Ham on 8 February 2009, extended the record to 1,212 minutes, beating the British top-flight record of 1,155 minutes previously set by Aberdeen's Bobby Clark in 1971. Finally, on 18 February 2009, Van der Sar further extended the record to 1,302 minutes, and in doing so, he broke José María Buljubasich's single-season world record of 1,289 minutes, set in the Chilean Clausura in 2005. His clean sheet record ended on 4 March, when he made an error allowing Peter Løvenkrands of Newcastle United to score after nine minutes. In total, Van der Sar had gone 1,311 minutes without conceding in the league. These clean sheets were a major factor in United clinching their 11th Premiership title, as United won several matches by a score of 1–0 ultimately finishing just four points ahead of Liverpool in the table. With a total of 21 clean sheets he also won the Premier League Golden Glove for 2008–09. However, he missed out on winning his third Champions League winners medal as United succumbed to a 2–0 defeat at the hands of Barcelona in the final of the tournament on 27 May 2009. Nevertheless, he won Best European Goalkeeper award from UEFA for the second time, 14 years after he first won it at Ajax. He was one of the five United players shortlisted for the PFA Players' Player of the Year award, which was ultimately given to his United teammate Ryan Giggs; however, Van der Sar was named in the PFA Team of the Year.

Van der Sar sustained a finger injury during the Audi Cup pre-season tournament, forcing him to miss the first 12 matches of Manchester United's 2009–10 season. On 6 October 2009, Van der Sar returned to action for United, playing 90 minutes in the reserves against Everton. On 17 October 2009, he returned to action in the first team, playing in United's 2–1 victory over Bolton Wanderers. On 21 November 2009, Van der Sar would suffer injury again and be kept out of action for 12 games, with the combination of the Dutchman's wife suffering a brain haemorrhage just before Christmas. On 16 January 2010, Van der Sar returned to action in a 3–0 win over Burnley.

Van der Sar signed a one-year extension to his current contract with Manchester United on 26 February 2010, keeping him at the club until at least the end of the 2010–11 season.

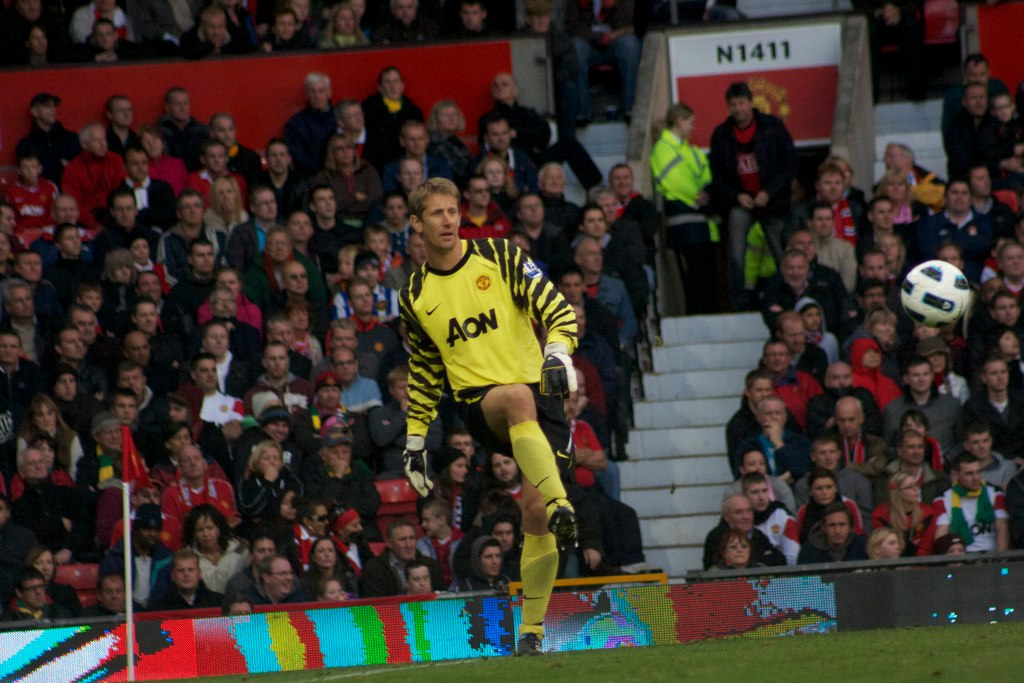
Van der Sar playing for Manchester United during the 2010–11 season

On 23 December 2010, British press reported that Sir Alex Ferguson had confirmed Van der Sar would retire at the end of the 2010–11 Premier League season. Although he denied the reports at the time, Van der Sar confirmed on 27 January 2011 it was now his intention. On 12 March, Van der Sar was named Man of the Match against Arsenal in the FA Cup after making several fine saves. United won the match 2–0 with goals from Wayne Rooney and Fabio. He was included in the PFA Team of the Year, making his third appearance there, others in 2007 and 2008.

On 22 May 2011, he played his final game at Old Trafford in a 4–2 victory over Blackpool, resulting in Blackpool's relegation from the Premier League. He captained United as a farewell treat. His last game for United was against Barcelona in the 2011 UEFA Champions League Final on 28 May, which United lost 3–1; at 40 years, 211 days he was the oldest male player to feature in a European Cup final in the Champions League era, with Dino Zoff holding the all-time record at 41 years, 86 days, when he appeared in the 1983 European Cup Final. Following the match, Van der Sar retired from active football.

=== Noordwijk ===
On 12 March 2016, Van der Sar made a brief return to football to play a single match for his former youth club Noordwijk. Noordwijk, playing in the amateur fifth tier, had suffered an injury crisis. He saved a penalty and conceded a goal in the match as they drew 1–1 with Jodan Boys.

== International career ==
Van der Sar was included in the Netherlands' 1994 World Cup squad but did not play. He had to wait until 7 June 1995 for his international debut, against Belarus. He was in goal for three successive eliminations from major competitions by penalties: Euro 1996, the 1998 World Cup and Euro 2000.

=== 1998 World Cup ===
Van der Sar backstopped the Netherlands to the semi-finals of the 1998 FIFA World Cup, where they were eliminated by Brazil 4–2 on penalties after a 1–1 draw. In the third-place playoff, Netherlands lost to upstart Croatia 2–1.

In the quarter-finals against Argentina, Van der Sar confronted Ariel Ortega after Ortega received a yellow card for a dive in the penalty area; the Argentine was then sent off for headbutting Van der Sar. Shortly after Ortega's red card, Dennis Bergkamp scored the winning goal in Netherlands' 2–1 victory.

=== Euro 2000 ===
Van der Sar started the Netherlands' first two group games at UEFA Euro 2000, but suffered an injury in the closing stages of their 3–0 win over Denmark and was replaced by Sander Westerveld for the final group match against France. Van der Sar returned for the quarter-finals, but was again replaced by Westerveld after 65 minutes, by which point the Netherlands had a 4–0 lead. Van der Sar kept another clean sheet in the semi-final against Italy, resulting in a goalless draw after Frank de Boer and Patrick Kluivert both failed to score from the penalty spot in regulation time. The match went to a penalty shoot-out, and although Van der Sar saved the effort from Italy captain Paolo Maldini, the Netherlands scored just one of their four kicks and lost 3–1. Van der Sar finished the tournament without conceding a single goal, but was left out of the Team of the Tournament in favour of France's Fabien Barthez and Italy's Francesco Toldo.

=== Euro 2004 ===
During the penalty shoot-out after the Euro 2004 quarter-final against Sweden, Van der Sar saved a penalty from Olof Mellberg, as the Netherlands won the shoot-out 5–4 and advanced to the semi-finals, where they lost to hosts Portugal.

=== 2006 World Cup ===
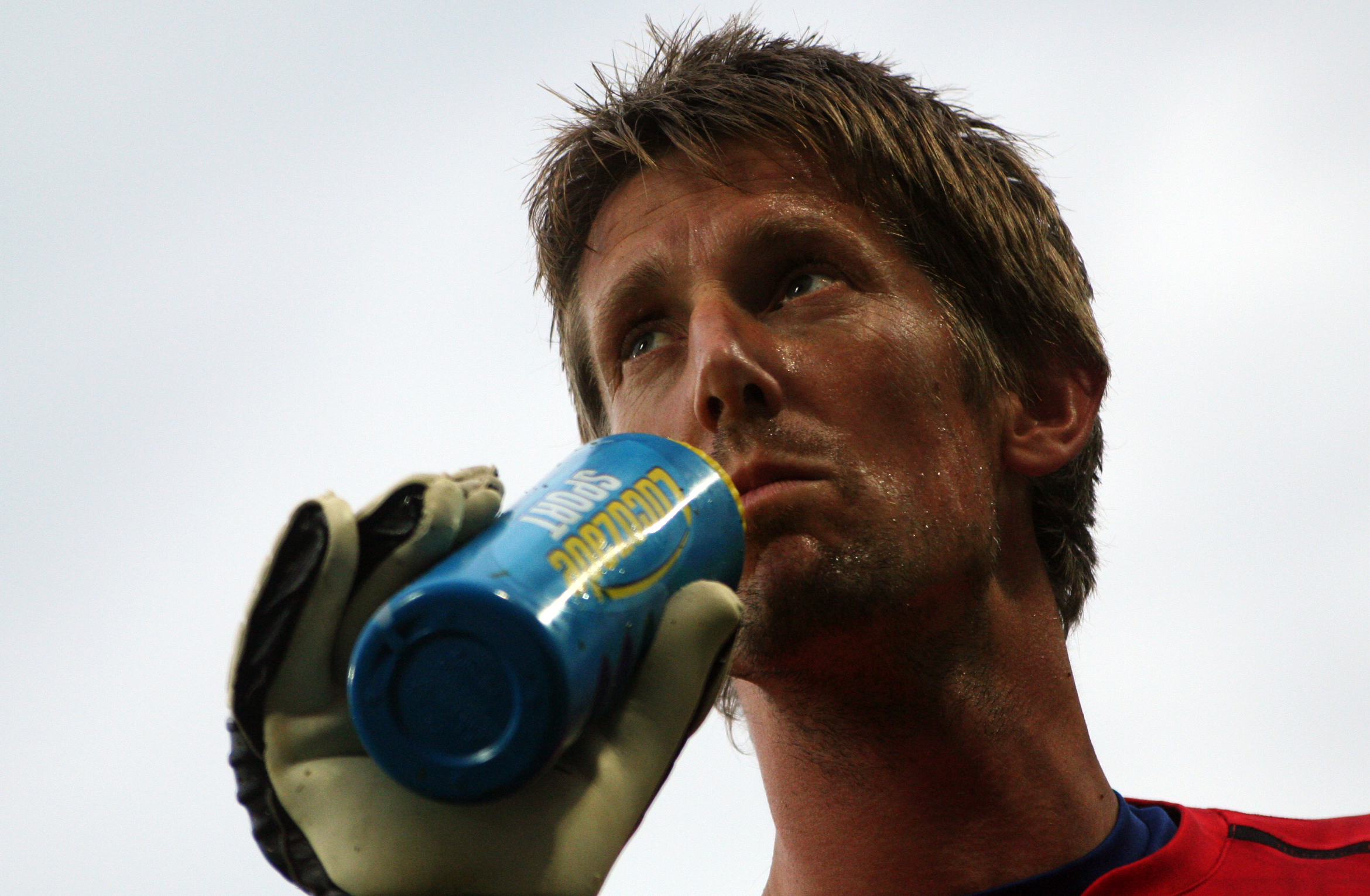
Van der Sar at Euro 2008

Prior to the 2006 World Cup group match against Côte d'Ivoire, Van der Sar had not conceded a goal in nine consecutive competitive matches. As captain of the Netherlands, he broke Frank de Boer's record of all-time caps for his country in the 2006 World Cup second-round match against Portugal.

=== Euro 2008 ===
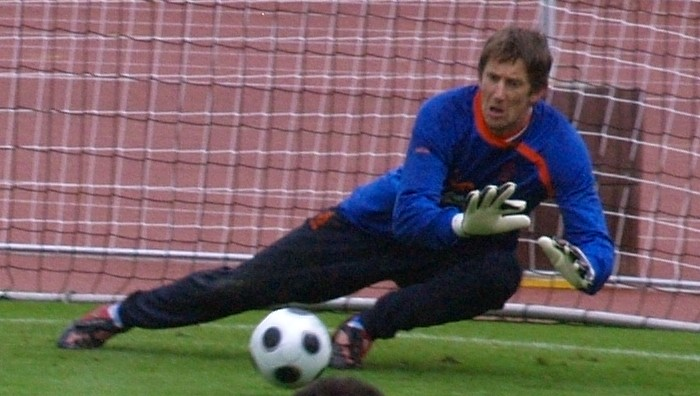
Van der Sar in training with the Netherlands prior to Euro 2008

On his 37th birthday, Van der Sar was interviewed by Radio 538 and stated that he intended to retire from international football after Euro 2008. Prior to the tournament, he was instrumental in bringing an end to a long-time dispute between veteran striker Ruud van Nistelrooy and manager Marco van Basten. He was the captain in their impressive 3–0 victory over Italy on 9 June 2008, and also on 13 June for the 4–1 victory over France. On 21 June, he played in the 3–1 quarter-final loss against Russia, which was believed to be his final international. This was his 16th appearance in a European Championship finals match, with which he equalled the record set by Lilian Thuram a few days earlier. Along with 22 other players Van der Sar was named in the team of the tournament. Following Euro 2008, Van der Sar had the distinction of playing more minutes at the European Football Championship than any other player.

=== 2010 FIFA World Cup qualification ===
On 3 October 2008, at the urging of new coach Bert van Marwijk, Van der Sar agreed to come out of international retirement for the Netherlands' 2010 FIFA World Cup qualification matches against Iceland and Norway after injuries to Maarten Stekelenburg and Henk Timmer made both unavailable for the two games. Van der Sar kept a clean sheet in both matches, which were won by the Dutch 2–0 and 1–0 respectively. In Oslo, the Dutch defeated Norway 1–0 courtesy of a Mark van Bommel goal, thus ensuring a fitting send-off for Van der Sar who earned his 130th cap during that match, a record for a Dutch player, and put him in the top forty most capped players of all time. He remained the Dutch team's most capped player until Wesley Sneijder surpassed him in 2017.

== Style of play ==
"I do not think I was the main protagonist. One of the very first to have brought a new perspective was Edwin van der Sar, who played a lot with his feet and allowed the position to enter a new phase. I was inspired by his style of play."

— German goalkeeper Manuel Neuer has praised Van der Sar for being among the first to bring a new perspective to goalkeeping

Regarded as one of the greatest and most complete keepers in football history, Van der Sar was a large, athletic, yet slender goalkeeper, who excelled at coming off his line to handle crosses due to his height and physique; in addition to his reflexes, positional sense, and shot-stopping abilities, he was also known for his calm composure, longevity, and his ability to organise his defence. Furthermore, he was also effective at stopping penalties. Van der Sar was known in particular for his skill with the ball at his feet, as well as his accurate distribution with either foot, which gave him the ability to launch counter-attacks from his area with long balls, or build attacking plays by playing the ball out from the back on the ground. Due to his ability in possession of the ball, and to rush off his line, he also functioned as a "sweeper-keeper" on occasion throughout his career, in particular during his time with Ajax.

== Post-playing career ==
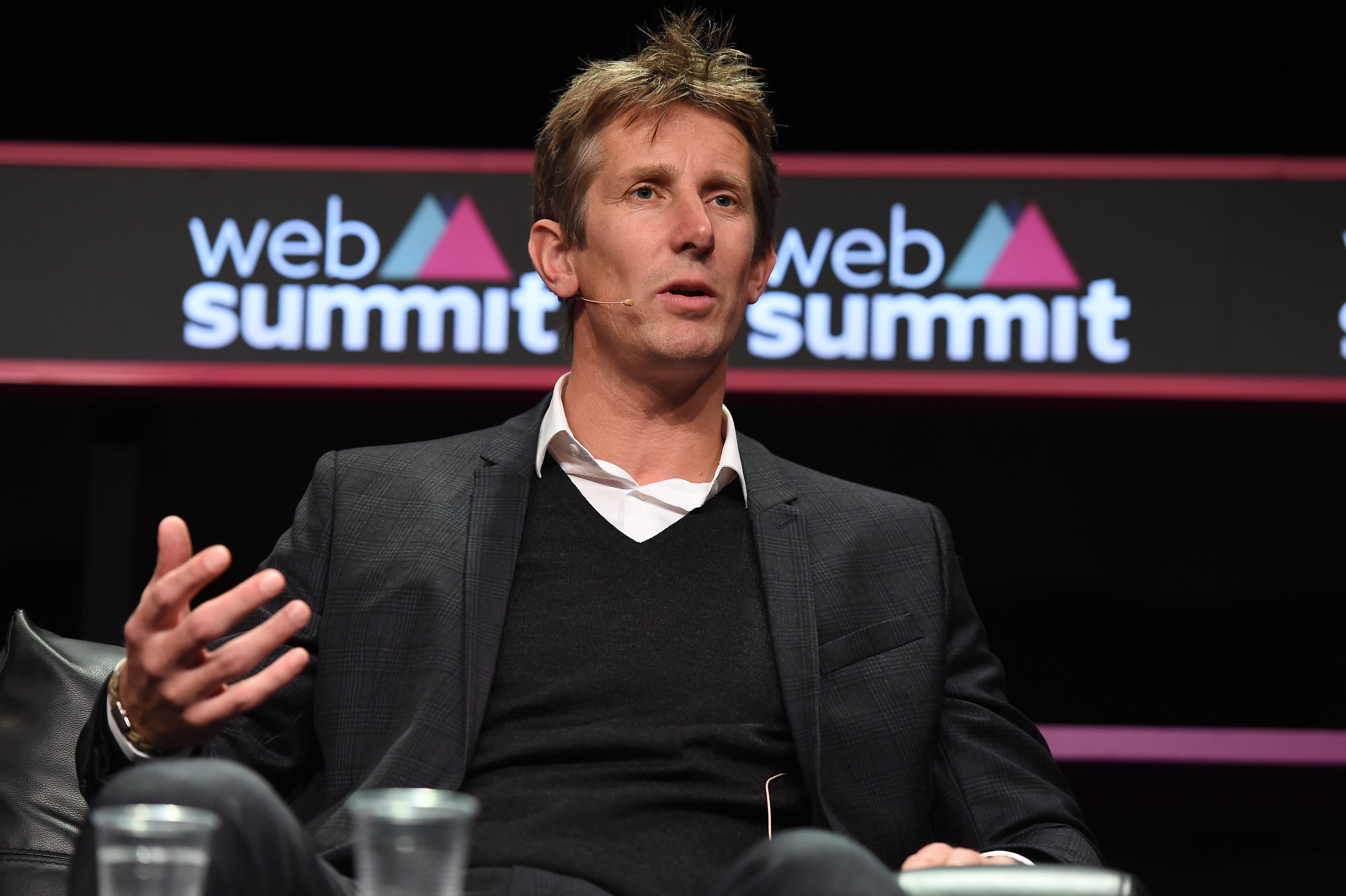
Van der Sar speaking at the 2015 Web Summit

On 3 August 2011, a testimonial was played at the Amsterdam Arena in honour of Van der Sar. The match featured the goalkeeper's "dream team", consisting of Wayne Rooney, John Heitinga, Louis Saha, Rio Ferdinand, Ryan Giggs, Paul Scholes, Nemanja Vidić, André Ooijer, Dirk Kuyt, Gary Neville, Michael Carrick, Edgar Davids, Giovanni van Bronckhorst, Boudewijn Zenden, and Dennis Bergkamp, with Alex Ferguson as manager. They faced the current Ajax first team, led by Frank de Boer.

Prior to this match two shorter matches took place. One featured the Ajax and Manchester United youth teams, and another one featured Ajax's 1995 squad against the Netherlands national team of 1998. The Ajax squad featured among others Finidi George, Nwankwo Kanu, Frank de Boer, Winston Bogarde, Nordin Wooter, Ronald de Boer, Danny Blind, Patrick Kluivert, Marc Overmars and Frank Rijkaard, and was managed by Louis van Gaal. The Netherlands squad featured among others Wim Jonk, Dennis Bergkamp, Roy Makaay, Ruud Hesp, Aron Winter, Richard Witschge and Pierre van Hooijdonk, and was managed by Guus Hiddink.

The viewership numbers in the Netherlands alone peaked at 2 million and it had a 26% total market share. The income generated by the match was to be donated to two charities (Make a Wish Foundation and Laureus); it generated so much money, however, that Van der Sar announced afterwards he would be starting his own charitable foundation to help spend the money.

During the event, it was announced that Van der Sar would be working as an analyst for the Nederlandse Omroep Stichting covering the 2011–12 UEFA Champions League. Van der Sar's son, Joe, made written comments stating his father would be working as a goalkeeping coach at Ajax within five years. Van der Sar himself said he did not want to make a full commitment to this, but confirmed it was likely and he was interested in building up his coaching career slowly, starting at the lower levels.

On 27 May 2012, Van der Sar participated in Soccer Aid 2012, playing for the Rest of the World side in the first half, making a full-length save from John Bishop. He was replaced at half-time by comedian Patrick Kielty. He also took part in the Soccer Aid 2014 match on 8 June 2014, again playing for the Rest of the World side in the first half before being once again replaced at half time by Patrick Kielty.

== Executive career ==
Van der Sar took on a role as Ajax's marketing director on 19 November 2012. He was promoted in late 2016 to the role of CEO.

In May 2023, he resigned as Ajax CEO.

== Personal life ==
Van der Sar and his wife Annemarie van Kesteren have two children. The couple's wedding ceremony took place at the Beurs van Berlage in Amsterdam, on 20 May 2006. Van der Sar's son, Joe, was on the pitch celebrating when his father saved a penalty in the Netherlands' 5–4 shoot-out victory over Sweden in the quarter-finals of UEFA Euro 2004. In December 2009, Van Kesteren was admitted to the hospital just two days before Christmas, reports said she had suffered a suspected brain haemorrhage and was in a "very poor" condition. Van der Sar was granted indefinite leave following his wife's collapse, and it is understood that she has made a good recovery, with no long-term effects.

In July 2023, Van der Sar was admitted to intensive care in hospital after suffering a brain haemorrhage. He was discharged from the unit two weeks later.

== Career statistics ==
=== Club ===
Appearances and goals by club, season and competition
Club	Season	League			National cup		League cup		Europe		Other (Note: Includes Johan Cruyff Shield, FA Community Shield, UEFA Super Cup, Intercontinental Cup, FIFA Club World Cup)		Total	
Club	Season	Division	Apps	Goals	Apps	Goals	Apps	Goals	Apps	Goals	Apps	Goals	Apps	Goals
Ajax	1990–91	Eredivisie	9	0	0	0	—		0	0	—		9	0
Ajax	1991–92	Eredivisie	0	0	0	0	—		0	0	—		0	0
Ajax	1992–93	Eredivisie	19	0	3	0	—		3	0	—		25	0
Ajax	1993–94	Eredivisie	32	0	4	0	—		6	0	1	0	43	0
Ajax	1994–95	Eredivisie	33	0	3	0	—		11	0	1	0	48	0
Ajax	1995–96	Eredivisie	33	0	2	0	—		11	0	4	0	50	0
Ajax	1996–97	Eredivisie	33	0	1	0	—		10	0	1	0	45	0
Ajax	1997–98	Eredivisie	33	1	5	0	—		8	0	—		46	1
Ajax	1998–99	Eredivisie	34	0	5	0	—		6	0	1	0	46	0
Ajax	Total		226	1	23	0	—		55	0	8	0	312	1
Juventus	1999–2000	Serie A	32	0	3	0	—		11	0	—		46	0
Juventus	2000–01	Serie A	34	0	2	0	—		6	0	—		42	0
Juventus	Total		66	0	5	0	—		17	0	—		88	0
Fulham	2001–02	Premier League	37	0	4	0	0	0	0	0	—		41	0
Fulham	2002–03	Premier League	19	0	0	0	0	0	11	0	—		30	0
Fulham	2003–04	Premier League	37	0	6	0	0	0	0	0	—		43	0
Fulham	2004–05	Premier League	34	0	5	0	1	0	0	0	—		40	0
Fulham	Total		127	0	15	0	1	0	11	0	—		154	0
Manchester United	2005–06	Premier League	38	0	2	0	3	0	8	0	—		51	0
Manchester United	2006–07	Premier League	32	0	3	0	0	0	12	0	—		47	0
Manchester United	2007–08	Premier League	29	0	4	0	0	0	10	0	1	0	44	0
Manchester United	2008–09	Premier League	33	0	2	0	0	0	10	0	4	0	49	0
Manchester United	2009–10	Premier League	21	0	0	0	2	0	6	0	0	0	29	0
Manchester United	2010–11	Premier League	33	0	2	0	0	0	10	0	1	0	46	0
Manchester United	Total		186	0	13	0	5	0	56	0	6	0	266	0
VV Noordwijk	2015–16	Hoofdklasse Saturday B	1	0	—		—		—		—		1	0
Career total			606	1	56	0	6	0	139	0	14	0	821	1

=== International ===
Appearances and goals by national team and year
National team	Year	Apps	Goals
Netherlands	1995	5	0
Netherlands	1996	10	0
Netherlands	1997	6	0
Netherlands	1998	14	0
Netherlands	1999	8	0
Netherlands	2000	12	0
Netherlands	2001	9	0
Netherlands	2002	6	0
Netherlands	2003	8	0
Netherlands	2004	17	0
Netherlands	2005	11	0
Netherlands	2006	12	0
Netherlands	2007	4	0
Netherlands	2008	8	0
Total		130	0

== Honours ==
Ajax

- Eredivisie: 1993–94, 1994–95, 1995–96, 1997–98
- KNVB Cup: 1992–93, 1997–98, 1998–99
- Dutch Supercup: 1993, 1994, 1995
- UEFA Champions League: 1994–95; runner-up: 1995–96
- UEFA Cup: 1991–92
- UEFA Super Cup: 1995
- Intercontinental Cup: 1995

Juventus

- UEFA Intertoto Cup: 1999

Fulham

- UEFA Intertoto Cup: 2002

Manchester United

- Premier League: 2006–07, 2007–08, 2008–09, 2010–11
- Football League Cup: 2005–06, 2009–10
- FA Community Shield: 2007, 2008, 2010
- UEFA Champions League: 2007–08; runner-up: 2008–09, 2010–11
- FIFA Club World Cup: 2008
- FA Cup runner-up: 2006–07

Individual

- Dutch Football Goalkeeper of the Year: 1994, 1995, 1996, 1997
- Best European Goalkeeper: 1995, 2009
- ESM Team of the Year: 1995–96, 2008–09
- Ajax Player of the Year (Rinus Michels Award): 1997–98
- Dutch Golden Shoe: 1998
- Fulham Player of the Year: 2004
- PFA Premier League Team of the Year: 2006–07, 2008–09, 2010–11
- UEFA European Championship Team of the Tournament: 2008
- Premier League Merit Award: 2008–09
- Most clean sheets in the Premier League: 2003–04, 2008–09
- Premier League Golden Glove: 2008–09
- UEFA Club Goalkeeper of the Year: 2009

Orders

- Officer of the Order of Orange-Nassau: 2010

== See also ==
- List of footballers with 100 or more caps
