= 1892–93 Netherlands Football League Championship =

Annual soccer tournament

Netherl. Football Championship
- Season: 1892–93
- Champions: Koninklijke HFC (2nd title)

The Netherlands Football League Championship 1892–1893 was contested by five teams from the cities Amsterdam, The Hague, Haarlem and Rotterdam. The teams participated in the competition that would later be called Eerste Klasse West. But since the western football district of the Netherlands was the only one to have a competition at the time, it could be regarded as a national championship. Koninklijke HFC won the championship, however this championship was not official, since the teams had not played an equal number of matches.

== League standings ==
Pos	Team	Pld	W	D	L	GF	GA	GD	Pts	Qualification
1	Koninklijke HFC	5	3	2	0	23	7	+16	8 (Note: Championship not considered official due to an unequal number of matches played between teams.)	
2	RAP	4	3	1	0	18	7	+11	7	
3	HVV Den Haag	6	3	1	2	11	13	−2	7	
4	RC en VV Rotterdam	6	2	2	2	8	11	−3	6	Not participating next season
5	Victoria Rotterdam	7	0	0	7	5	27	−22	0	
