= Koninklijke HFC =

Dutch football club

- Full name: Koninklijke Haarlemsche Football Club
- Nickname: Koninklijke HFC
- Founded: 15 September 1879; 147 years ago
- Ground: Spanjaardslaan, Haarlem
- Capacity: 1,000
- Coordinates: 52°21′49.7″N 4°37′22.4″E
- Chairman: Gert-Jan Pruijn
- Manager: Gertjan Tamerus
- League: Tweede Divisie
- 2025–26: Tweede Divisie, 15th of 18
- Website: www.konhfc.nl
Home colours	Away colours

Koninklijke Haarlemsche Football Club (Royal Haarlem Football Club) is a football club based in Haarlem, Netherlands. It is the oldest existing club in Dutch football, founded by Pim Mulier in 1879. During the club's early years, the team only played rugby, but due to financial problems, they then switched to association football. The first official football match in the Netherlands was played in 1886 between HFC and Amsterdam Sport.

The club currently play in the Tweede Divisie (Second Division), a semi-professional tier re-established for the 2016–17 season, which is the third tier of the Dutch football pyramid and the highest non-pro league.

== History ==
Koninklijke HFC was the first Dutch Rugby club, established on 15 September 1879 by the 14-year-old Pim Mulier, who first encountered the sport in 1870. However, HFC switched to association football in 1883. (The Delftsche Studenten Rugby Club was the first official rugby club on 24 September 1918.)

In 1899, they moved from their original ground "De Koekamp" to the "Spanjaardslaan", where they still play their home matches to this day. In that period, the Spanjaardslaan (Spaniard's Lane), the east–west road at the southern edge of the oldest public park of the Netherlands, was part of the neighbouring town of Heemstede, but switched back to be part of Haarlem in 1927.

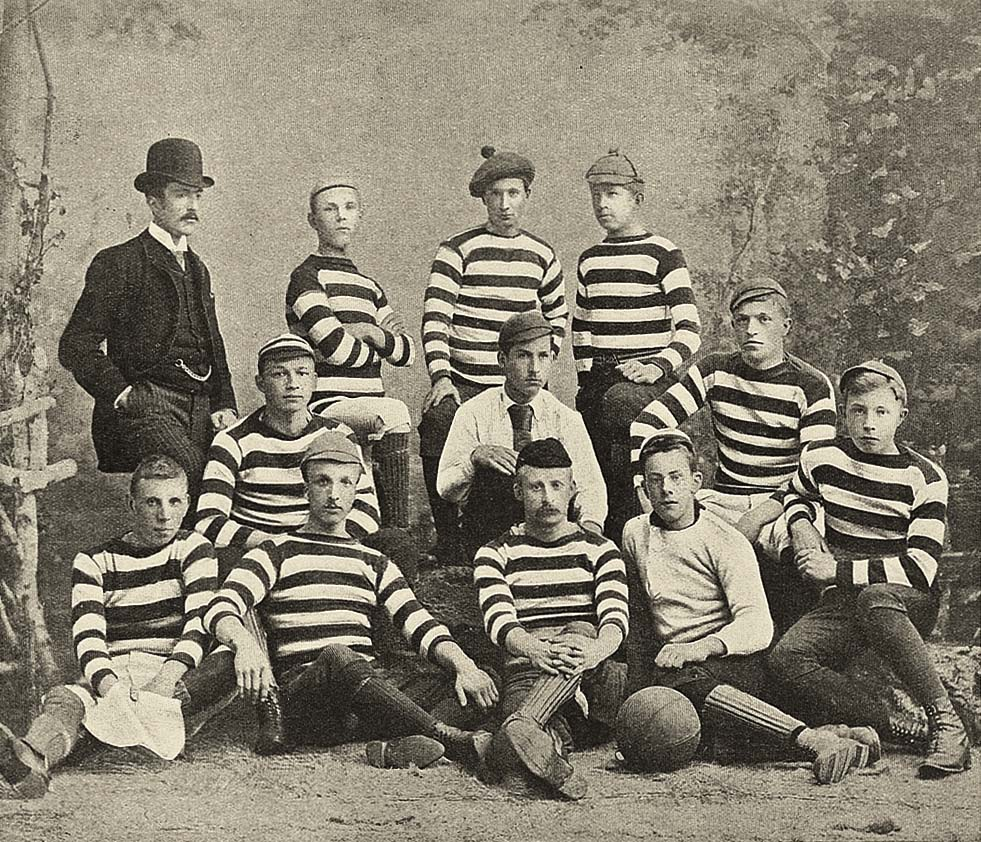
The beginning of football in the Netherlands

The Netherlands national football team have played two international matches at the Spanjaardslaan. Both matches were versus Belgium, resulting in a 1–2 loss and a 7–0 win. In the past, HFC has contributed several players to the Netherlands national football team. Of those players, goalkeeper Gejus van der Meulen obtained the most caps, 54. At present, his grandson still plays for HFC.

Before the Dutch championship was officially established, HFC won three unofficial national titles:

- 1889–1890
- 1892–1893
- 1894–1895

Three times in the club's history they have won the KNVB Cup (1904, 1913 and 1915). In the cup competition of 1903–04, HFC beat VVV from Amsterdam 25–0, which still remains a record score in the Dutch cup competition.

The club was named Koninklijk (Royal) in 1959, 80 years after the club was founded. Since 1923, the first team of HFC plays the opening match of a new year versus a selection of former Dutch international players on 1 January.

== Current squad ==
As of 24 October 2026

Note: Flags indicate national team as defined under FIFA eligibility rules; some limited exceptions apply. Players may hold more than one non-FIFA nationality.

No.	Pos.	Nation	Player
1	GK	NED	Joe van der Sar
2	DF	NED	Marijn Ploem
3	DF	NED	Ruben Heeremans
4	MF	NED	Joost van der Weijden
5	DF	NED	Robin Lathouwers
6	DF	NED	Fons Gemmel
7	MF	NED	Flip Klomp
8	MF	NED	Max Fichtinger
9	FW	NED	Niels Donker
10	FW	NED	Delano Ladan
11	MF	BEL	Rabbi Mwenda
12	FW	NED	Loed Klaasen
14	MF	NED	Niels Butter

No.	Pos.	Nation	Player
15	MF	NED	Joas Kors
16	MF	NED	Jan Muller
17	FW	TUR	Mehmet Yüksel
18	DF	NED	Wessel Boer
19	MF	NED	Tijn Ras
20	FW	NED	Ties de Boer
21	GK	NED	Koen Bucker
33	FW	NED	Ezechiel Fiemawhle
34	MF	NED	Binck Bakker
40	MF	NED	Oumar Diallo
43	MF	NED	Eliass Taabouni
77	DF	NED	Andre Morgan

== Former players ==
=== National team players ===
The following players were called up to represent their national teams in international football and received caps during their tenure with Koninklijke HFC:

- Netherlands
- (Netherlands) Pieter Boelmans ter Spill (1907)
- (Netherlands) Cees ten Cate (1908–1913)
- (Netherlands) Jacques Francken (1909–1919)
- (Netherlands) Mannes Francken (1905–1916)
- (Netherlands) Lothar van Gogh (1906–1914)
- (Netherlands) Max Henny (1905–1907)
- (Netherlands) Frits Kuipers (1920–1923)
- (Netherlands) Gejus van der Meulen (1922–1935)
- (Netherlands) Dolf van der Nagel (1912–1914)
- (Netherlands) Dick Sigmond (1925–1927)
- (Netherlands) Ben Stom (1907–1908)
- (Netherlands) Ben Verweij (1918–1924)
- (Netherlands) Ferry van der Vinne (1904–1909)
- (Netherlands) Henk Wamsteker (1928–1929)
  Somalia
- (Somalia) Liban Abdulahi (2020)

- Years in brackets indicate careerspan with Koninklijke HFC.

== Players in international tournaments ==
The following is a list of Koninklijke HFC players who have competed in international tournaments, including the FIFA World Cup. To this date no Koninklijke HFC players have participated in the UEFA European Championship, Africa Cup of Nations, Copa América, AFC Asian Cup, CONCACAF Gold Cup or the OFC Nations Cup while playing for the Koninklijke HFC.

Cup	Players
(Italy) 1934 FIFA World Cup	(Netherlands) Gejus van der Meulen

== See also ==
- Club of Pioneers
