= Netherlands national football team results (unofficial matches) =

- Win Draw Loss

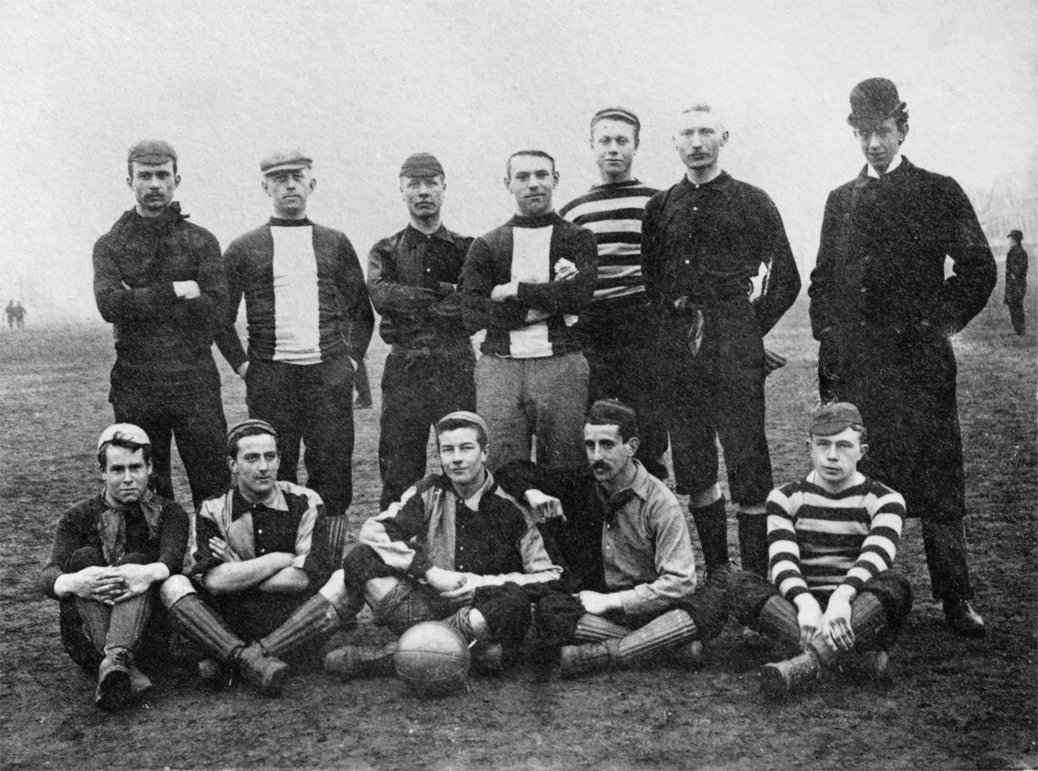
The unofficial Dutch national team in their first match against Felixstowe in 1894.

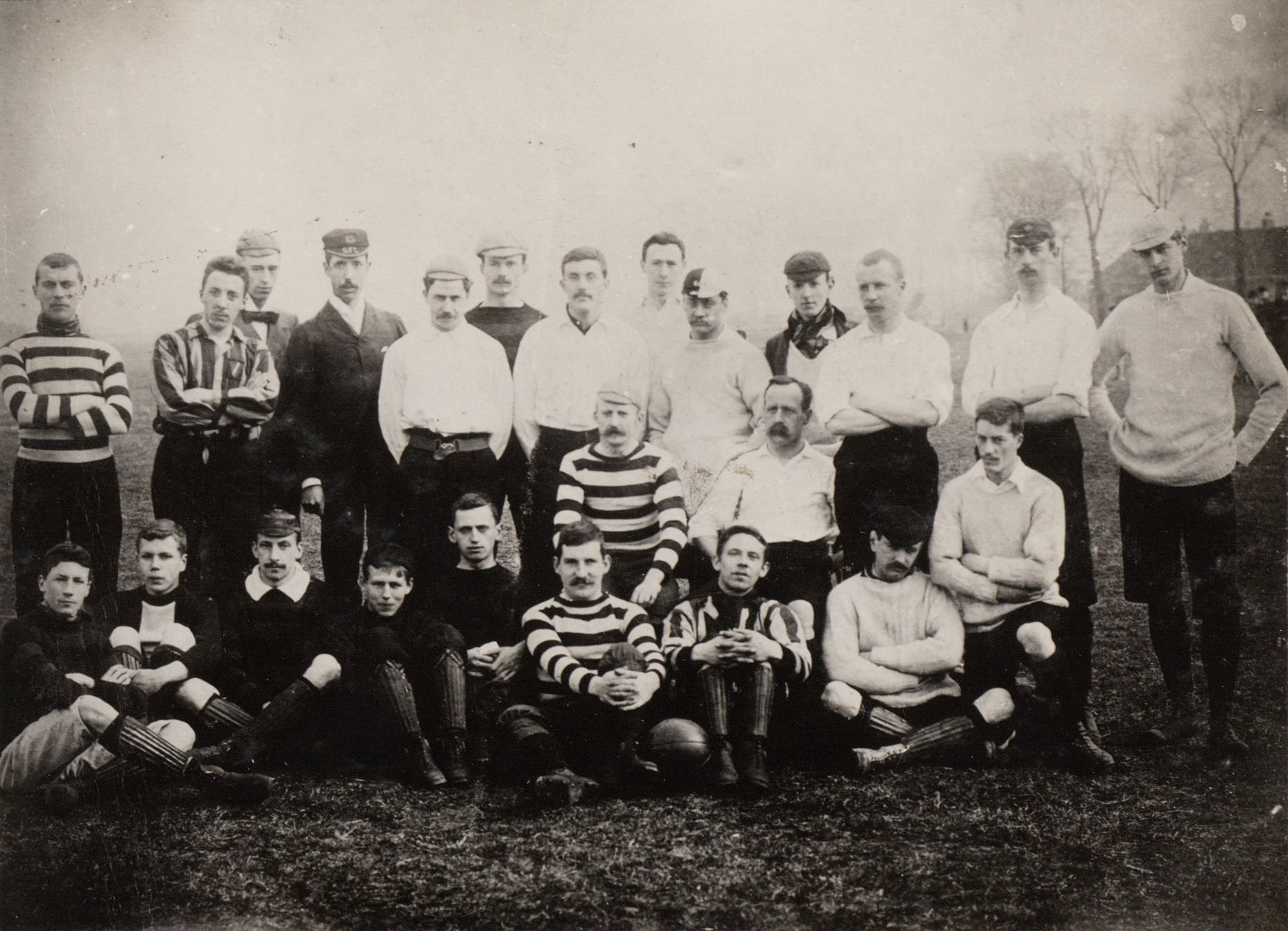
Mulier as captain of the unofficial Dutch national team in a match against Maidstone in 1895.

This is a list of the Netherlands national football team's results from 1894 to the present day that, for various reasons, are not accorded the status of official internationals and are not being recognized by FIFA. Player appearances and goals in these matches are also not counted to their totals.

The national team played twelve matches until the first official international match of the Netherlands took place in 1905. They played their first match against the English side Felixstowe FC on 6 February 1894. Their first unofficial victory came against the English side Maidstone FC, which was defeated 4–3, thanks to two goals from Pim Mulier. The biggest victory came on 18 November 1895 when Saxmundham FC, the losing finalists in the Suffolk Senior Cup the season before, was sent home after a 9–2 loss, thanks in part to a 5-goal haul from Rein Boomsma.

== 1890s ==
=== 1894 ===
6 February 1894 Friendly match	Netherlands	0–1	(England) Felixstowe FC	Rotterdam
	Tromp (HFC); Kampers (RAP), Ples (HFC); J. van den Bosch (HVV), Menten (HFC), Schröder (RAP, captain); Kampschreur (Sparta), Kan (Victoria Rotterdam), Timmermans (Sparta), Weinthal (Sparta) and Meyer (HFC)	Report1; Report2	A. J. Howard ?	Stadium: Exercitieterrein (Sparta site); Attendance: 500

23 March 1894 Friendly match	University XI (Netherlands)	2–5	Netherlands	Rotterdam, Netherlands
		Report

10 April 1894 Friendly match	Netherlands	4–3	(England) Maidstone FC	Heemstede
	Mulier 1–0', 3–0'; W. Schorer 2–0'; Puck Meijer 4–0'	Report	Barber 3–1'; Unknown 4–2', 4–3'	Stadium: HFC site
Note: The English came with only eight players and had to be reinforced with three Dutch players.

3 December 1894 Friendly match	Netherlands	3–3	(England) Felixstowe FC	Rotterdam
14:00	J. Bakker 1–1' van Holten 2–1'; L. Weinthal 3–1'	Report	Unknown 0–1', 3–2', 3–3'	Stadium: Exercitieterrein (Sparta site); Attendance: 500

=== 1895 ===
30 March 1895 Friendly match	East Netherlands XI	0–4	(England) Maidstone FC	Arnhem
		Report

31 March 1895 Friendly match	Netherlands	1–2	(England) Maidstone FC	Heemstede
14:30	J. Stok 1–2'	Report	Wethered 0–1'; Smith 0–2'	Stadium: HFC site Referee: L.J. Wijnands (Netherlands)

1 April 1895 Friendly match	North Holland XI (Netherlands)	1–6	(England) Maidstone FC	Heemstede
		Report

2 April 1895 Friendly match	Dutch Student XI (Netherlands)	0–1	(England) Maidstone FC	Utrecht
		Report

18 November 1895 Friendly match	Netherlands	9–2	(England) Saxmundham FC	Sparta site, Rotterdam
	van Holten 1–0', 3–0'; Boomsma 2–0', 4–1', 7–2', 8–2', 9–2'; J. H. Meijer 5–1'; Ch. van Braam Houckgeest 6–1'	Report	Unknown 3–1', 6–2'	Referee: H.A. Tromp (Netherlands)
Note: They were invited by Sparta. Although losing finalists in the Suffolk Senior Cup the season before, they could not offer the Dutch enough resistance, since Sparta won 5–0 and the Dutch team 9–2.

=== 1896 ===
11 April 1896 Friendly match	East Netherlands XI	1–5	(England) English Wanderers	Arnhem
		Report

12 April 1896 Friendly match	Netherlands	2–3	(England) English Wanderers	Amsterdam
	Broese van Groenou 1–0'; Van Braam Houckgeest 2–1'	Report1; Report2	C.B. Ward 1–1', 2–2', 2–3'	Stadium: RAP site Referee: H.A. Tromp (Netherlands)

14 April 1896 Friendly match	Dutch Student XI (Netherlands)	3–2	(England) English Wanderers	Heemstede
		Report

=== 1897 ===
27 March 1897 Friendly match	East Netherlands XI	1–2	(England) English Wanderers	Arnhem
		Report

28 March 1897 Friendly match	Netherlands	2–6	(England) English Wanderers	Heemstede
	F.W. Bult 1–3'; Bernicke 2–4'	Report	van Hasselt 0–1' (o.g.); Unknown 0–2', 0–3', 1–4', 2–5', 2–6'	Stadium: HFC site Referee: L.J. Wijnands (Netherlands)

30 March 1897 Friendly match	Dutch Student XI (Netherlands)	2–5	(England) English Wanderers	Rotterdam
		Report

2 April 1897 Friendly match	Dutch Student XI (Netherlands)	1–5	(England) English Wanderers	Leiden
		Report

=== 1898 ===
10 April 1898 Friendly match	Netherlands	7–0	(England) English Wanderers	Rotterdam
	Harry Roqué 1–0', 6–0'; Van den Berg 2–0', 3–0', 4–0'; Heuckelum 6–0'; J. Führi 7–0'	Report		Stadium: Sparta site Referee: H.A. Tromp (Netherlands)

14 April 1898 Friendly match	Dutch Student XI (Netherlands)	2–0	(England) English Wanderers	Leiden
		Report

=== 1899 ===
2 April 1899 Friendly match	Netherlands	1–6	(England) English Wanderers	The Hague
	Van den Berg 1–5'	Report	?	Stadium: HVV site

3 April 1899 Friendly match	Dutch Student XI (Netherlands)	2–2	(England) English Wanderers	Leiden
		Report

6 April 1899 Friendly match	North Netherlands XI	1–7	(England) English Wanderers	Zwolle
		Report

== 1900s and Coupe Vanden Abeele ==
In the early 1900s, the Netherlands played four unofficial matches against Belgium as they contested for the Coupe Vanden Abeele. The Dutch were represented by sides selected and organized by Cees van Hasselt, but since the games were not being sanctioned by the Royal Dutch Football Association (KNVB), only players from the second division were available to Van Hasselt, so Belgium naturally won those games.

30 December 1900 Friendly match	Netherlands	5–1	(Germany) BFC Preussen	HVV site, The Hague
	Sol 1–0'; Hesselink 2–0', 5–1'; Offers 3–0', 4–1'	Report	Unknown 3–1'
Note: BFC Preussen won three consecutive Berlin Football Championships in 1899–1901, and such was their success, that they contested a match against the unofficial Dutch national team on 30 December 1900.

28 April 1901 1901 Coupe Vanden Abeele	Belgium	8 – 0	Netherlands C	Antwerp, Belgium
	H. Potts ?', ?', ?', ?', ?', ?', ?'; W. Potts ?'	Report		Stadium: Beerschot A.C. ground Attendance: 300; Referee: Charles Maggee

25 December 1901 Friendly match	Netherlands	8–1	(France) FC de Paris	HFC site, Haarlem
	Hesselink 1–0', 2–1'; Unknown	Report	Unknown 1–1'

5 January 1902 1902 Coupe Vanden Abeele	Belgium	1 – 0	Netherlands ("van Hasselt XI")	Antwerp, Belgium
	W. Potts	Report		Stadium: Beerschot A.C. ground Referee: Paul de Borman

30 March 1902 Friendly match	Netherlands	3–1	(England) Old Xaverians FC	HBS site, The Hague
	M.J. Offers 1–0' (pen.); Overman 2–0'; Penninck 3–0'	Report	Hodson 3–1'

15 December 1902 1903 Coupe Vanden Abeele	Belgium	2 – 1	Netherlands ("van Hasselt XI")	Antwerp, Belgium
	Blanchard 1–1'; H. Potts 2–1'	Report	Lotsy 0–1'	Stadium: Beerschot A.C. ground

13 April 1903 Friendly match	Netherlands	6–3	(Denmark) Boldklubben af 1893	HBS site, The Hague
		Report
Note: On the previous day, 12 April, Boldklubben defeated HVV Den Haag 5–4.

3 January 1904 1904 Coupe Vanden Abeele	Belgium	6 – 4	Netherlands ("van Hasselt XI")	Antwerp, Belgium
	H. Potts 1–0', 2–1', 4–2', 6–4'; Feye 3–2', 5–4'	Report	Bekker 1–1'; Kamperdijk 2–2'; Van den Berg 3–4'; Wollenberg 4–4'	Stadium: Beerschot A.C. ground Referee: Herbert Willing (Netherlands)
Note: Belgium had originally announced to field an exclusively Belgian squad, but eventually replaced Paul Chibert (injured) with Herbert Potts, who contributed decisively to Belgium's win, scoring four goals.

21 April 1905 International friendly	Holland XI (Netherlands)	2–3	(England) London Caledonians	Den Haag, Netherlands
		Report

19 April 1906 International friendly	Holland XI (Netherlands)	1–2	(England) Corinthians FC	Den Haag, Netherlands
		Report

== 1910s ==
In the 20th century, the Netherlands played several unofficial matches against British clubs, and did it under several different names such as Netherlands/Holland XI, Select Netherlands/Holland, or even Olympic Dutch sides.

16 June 1912 International friendly	Netherlands Olympic XI	2–3	(England) Reading	Amsterdam, Netherlands
		Report

29 August 1919 Friendly match	Vestland selection	0 – 5	Netherlands	Kristiania, Norway
		[Report]	Felix 5'; Dé Kessler 21', 76'; Evert van Linge 22', 63'

== 1920s ==
Apart from the official biannual Low Countries derbies, Belgium played against the Netherlands for diverse purposes in the 1920s; the 1925 and 1926 matches served as fundraisers for FIFA and charity, respectively, and in the 1929 match the Royal Dutch Football Association's 40th anniversary was celebrated.

=== 1922–1926 ===
22 April 1922 International friendly	Select Dutch University (Netherlands)	3–5	(England) Corinthians FC	Amsterdam, Netherlands
		Report

7 April 1923 International friendly	Select Dutch University (Netherlands)	0–2	(England) Corinthians FC	Amsterdam, Netherlands
		Report

8 May 1924 International friendly	Select Olympic Holland (Netherlands)	3–4	(England) Queens Park Rangers	Amsterdam, Netherlands
		Report

12 May 1924 International friendly	Select Olympic Holland (Netherlands)	1–0	(England) Queens Park Rangers	Amsterdam, Netherlands
		Report

14 May 1924 International friendly	Select Olympic Holland (Netherlands)	2–2	(England) Leeds United	Amsterdam, Netherlands
		Report

6 September 1925 International Friendly	Belgium	1 – 1	Netherlands	Antwerp, Belgium

29 August 1926 International Friendly	Netherlands	1 – 5	Belgium	Rotterdam, Netherlands
	Van Gelder 15'		Frenay 9'; Devos 37'; De Spae 39', 49', 66'

=== 1927 ===
15 April 1927 International friendly	Select Olympic Holland (Netherlands)	2–1	(England) Barnet	Amsterdam, Netherlands
		Report

15 May 1927 International friendly	Select Olympic Holland (Netherlands)	4–0	(England) Newcastle United	Amsterdam, Netherlands
		Report

18 May 1927 International friendly	Select Olympic Holland (Netherlands)	0–2	(England) Newcastle United	Amsterdam, Netherlands
		Report

22 May 1927 International friendly	Select Olympic Holland (Netherlands)	1–4	(England) Newcastle United	Amsterdam, Netherlands
		Report

26 May 1927 International friendly	Select Olympic Holland (Netherlands)	2–4	(England) Newcastle United	Amsterdam, Netherlands
		Report

29 May 1927 International friendly	Select Olympic Holland (Netherlands)	0–5	(England) Newcastle United	Amsterdam, Netherlands
		Report

20 November 1927 International friendly	Select Holland Olympic (Netherlands)	7–2	(England) Middlesex Wanderers	Utrecht, Netherlands
		Report

=== 1928 ===
6 April 1928 International friendly	Select Olympic Holland (Netherlands)	4–2	(England) Wimbledon	Amsterdam, Netherlands
		Report

6 May 1928 International friendly	Select Olympic Holland (Netherlands)	2–5	(England) Tottenham Hotspur	Amsterdam, Netherlands
		Report

13 May 1928 International friendly	Holland Combined XI (Netherlands)	0–3	(England) Tottenham Hotspur	Amsterdam, Netherlands
		Report

=== 1929 ===
8 December 1929 International Friendly	Netherlands	1 – 0	Belgium	Amsterdam, Netherlands

== 1930s ==
=== 1930 ===
Outside the official biannual Low Countries derbies, Belgium faced the Netherlands for diverse reasons in the 1930s; the 1930 match served to inaugurate the new national stadium, the two matches in 1932 served as a fundraiser for FIFA and charity, and the 1939 match was at the occasion of the Royal Dutch Football Association's 50th anniversary.

14 September 1930 International Friendly	Belgium	4 – 1	Netherlands	Brussels, Belgium
14:17 UTC+1	Vanderbauwhede ?', ?'; Moeschal ?'; Voorhoof ?'		Van Reenen ?'	Stadium: Jubilee Stadium; Attendance: 50,000; Referee: Cejnar (Czechoslovakia)

=== 1931 ===
3 February 1931 International friendly	Holland XI (Netherlands)	1–3	(England) Reading	Rotterdam, Netherlands
		Report

4 March 1931 International friendly	Holland XI (Netherlands)	1–3	(England) Nottingham Forest	Rotterdam, Netherlands
		Report

22 March 1931 International friendly	Select Holland (Netherlands)	3–3	(England) Charlton Athletic	Rotterdam, Netherlands
		Report

26 April 1931 International friendly	Select South Netherlands	1–5	(England) Port Vale	Eindhoven, Netherlands
		Report

27 September 1931 International friendly	Select Holland (Netherlands)	1–2	(England) Mansfield Town	Den Haag, Netherlands
		Report

27 October 1931 International friendly	Select Holland (Netherlands)	3–2	(England) Blackburn Rovers	Rotterdam, Netherlands
		Report

=== 1932 ===
14 February 1932 International Friendly	Netherlands	2 – 3	Belgium	Amsterdam, Netherlands
	Wels 36'; Van Nellen 47'		Versijp 31', 85'; Capelle 87'	Referee: Rous (England)

9 March 1932 International friendly	Select Holland (Netherlands)	6–1	(England) Southampton	Rotterdam, Netherlands
		Report

5 October 1932 International friendly	Select Netherlands	4–7	(England) Bristol Rovers	Rotterdam, Netherlands
		Report

16 October 1932 International Friendly	Belgium	2 – 3	Netherlands	Brussels, Belgium

=== 1935 ===
22 March 1935 International friendly	Select Holland (Netherlands)	2–1	(England) Cardiff City	Rotterdam, Netherlands
		Report

23 October 1935 International friendly	Select Netherlands	2–1	(England) Watford	Rotterdam, Netherlands
		Report

27 November 1935 International friendly	Select Netherlands	3–1	(England) Millwall Athletic	Rotterdam, Netherlands
		Report

=== 1936 ===
18 March 1936 International friendly	Dutch International XI (Netherlands)	4–0	(England) Southend United	Haarlem, Netherlands
		Report

22 October 1936 International friendly	Select Netherlands	7–2	(England) Doncaster Rovers	Amsterdam, Netherlands
		Report

=== 1937 ===
18 January 1937 International friendly	Dutch International XI (Netherlands)	2–3	(England) Southend United	Rotterdam, Netherlands
		Report

24 February 1937 International friendly	Netherlands XI	2–2	(England) Crystal Palace	Rotterdam, Netherlands
		Report

24 March 1937 International friendly	Holland XI (Netherlands)	5–1	(England) Ipswich Town	Amsterdam, Netherlands
		Report

6 May 1937 International friendly	Netherlands XI	1–1	(England) West Ham United	Arnhem, Netherlands
		Report

8 May 1937 International friendly	Netherlands XI	2–3	(England) West Ham United	Leeuwarden, Netherlands
		Report

12 May 1937 International friendly	Netherlands XI	3–1	(England) West Ham United	Utrecht, Netherlands
		Report

9 May 1937 International friendly	Select Holland (Netherlands)	0–1	(England) Stoke City	Amsterdam, Netherlands
		Report

17 May 1937 International friendly	Netherlands XI	1–4	(England) West Ham United	Eindhoven, Netherlands
		Report

=== 1938 ===
23 March 1938 International friendly	Netherlands XI	3–2	(England) Crystal Palace	Rotterdam, Netherlands
		Report

October 1938 International friendly	Select Holland (Netherlands)	8–2	(England) York City	Rotterdam, Netherlands
		Report

=== 1939 ===
15 February 1939 International friendly	Select Netherlands XI	1–4	(England) Watford	Rotterdam, Netherlands
		Report

== 2000 ==
31 May 2000 Unofficial friendly	Servette (Switzerland)	0–4	Netherlands	Geneva
			Kluivert 19'; Seedorf 34'; Makaay 76'; Hasselbaink 90+2'	Stadium: Charmilles; Attendance: 12,000; Referee: Philippe Leuba (Switzerland)

== 2012 ==
The Netherlands played a match against Bayern Munich in compensation for Arjen Robben's injury during the 2010 FIFA World Cup.

22 May 2012 Friendly	Bayern Munich (Germany)	3–2	Netherlands	Munich
20:30 CEST	Kroos 17'; Petersen 28'; Gómez 87'	Report	Huntelaar 18'; Narsingh 20'	Stadium: Allianz Arena; Attendance: 33,000

== 2024 ==
26 June 2024 Unofficial friendly	TSV Havelse (Germany)	1–6	Netherlands	Wolfsburg
	Illic	Report	Weghorst; Van de Ven; Brobbey; Frimpong	Stadium: AOK Stadion
Note: The match was composed of three 35-minute periods.
