= 1899 KNVB Cup final =

- Event: 1898–99 KNVB Cup
RAP Amsterdam	HVV Den Haag
1	0
- Date: 7 May 1899
- Venue: Koekamp, Heemstede
- Referee: Bill Dijxhoorn

The 1899 KNVB Cup final was a football match between Dutch clubs RAP Amsterdam, the reigning national champion, and HVV Den Haag, which took place on 9 May 1899 at Koekamp, Heemstede. It was the final match of the 1898–99 KNVB Cup, the 1st season of the annual Dutch national football cup competition. RAP won thanks to an extra-time goal from Jan Hisgen.

== Pre-match ==
The final saw the reigning national champion from Amsterdam, RAP, face the then-best club from The Hague, HVV. The match was initially supposed to be played at the Hercules grounds in Utrecht, but that club is thrown off its grounds just before the final, which results in a hasty move to Heemstede. Johan Schröder, the captain of RAP in this final and also a sports journalist, wrote about this last-minute change in De Athleet, stating it was "a circumstance that of course had a very disadvantageous effect" - not exactly the best example of independent sports journalism.

== Overview ==
The match's first chance fell to HVV, but it was RAP who came closest to a goal in the first half, and in fact, they scored twice, but the referee Bill Dijxhoorn disallows both goals, one for offside and the other for handball. The score remained 0-0 until half-time and there were no goals in the second half either.

The match ended in a draw after 90 minutes, so the first period of extra time, consisting of two halves of 7½ minutes each, was played; after that had ended without a decision, a second such period was followed (as stipulated by the regulations). These additional 15 minutes also seemed to end goalless, but Guy Zweerts "pushes forward, places the ball past Mundt, and gives the quickly approaching Jan Hisgen a great chance, who strikes it with his first touch, which flies between Kool's legs before he can close them". RAP thus wins the cup, which is given to the hands of RAP's captain Schröder by its donator Hak Holdert, and which now remains in the clubhouse of the Amsterdam club. Interestingly, Schröder later became one of the most feared journalists in the Netherlands as editor-in-chief of the Telegraaf, then presided by Holdert.

During the match, there was "a rather annoying wind that blew diagonally across the field".

== Match ==
=== Details ===
7 May 1899

RAP Amsterdam	1–0	HVV Den Haag
Jan Hisgen 116'	Report1; Report2

Koekamp, Heemstede, Netherlands
Referee: Bill Dijxhoorn

GK	(Netherlands) Carl Rincker
DF	(France) Moreau
DF	(Netherlands) Johannes van der Linde
MF	(Netherlands) Johan Schröder
MF	(Netherlands) Hülsmann
MF	(Netherlands) H. de Bruy
FW	(Netherlands) Ferdinand Lieftinck
FW	(Netherlands) Guy Zweerts
FW	(Netherlands) Jan Hisgen
FW	(Netherlands) Jan Zweerts
FW	(Netherlands) Freek Kampschreur
Substitutes:
Manager:

GK	(Netherlands) Alexander Anthon Kool
DF	(Netherlands) Dirk Erdman
DF	(Netherlands) Miel Mundt
DF	(Netherlands) Adolf Broese van Groenou
DF	(Netherlands) F. L. Klein
MF	(Netherlands) Frederik Beukema
MF	(Netherlands) J.W.G. Coops
FW	(Netherlands) Johan Marie Erdman
FW	(Netherlands) Eetje Sol
FW	(Netherlands) Wou Broese van Groenou
FW	(Netherlands) Karel Beukema
Substitutes:
Manager:

1898–99 KNVB Cup Winners
RAP Amsterdam
1st Title

Match officials

- Assistant referees:
- Fourth official:

Match rules

- 90 minutes.

== Legacy ==
This win meant that R.A.P. became the first team in the Netherlands to win the Dutch league-and-cup double, and in total, they had played 19 competitive matches, winning 17 and drawing 2, with a 61-21 goal record.
