= Johan Schröder =

Dutch footballer (1871–1938)

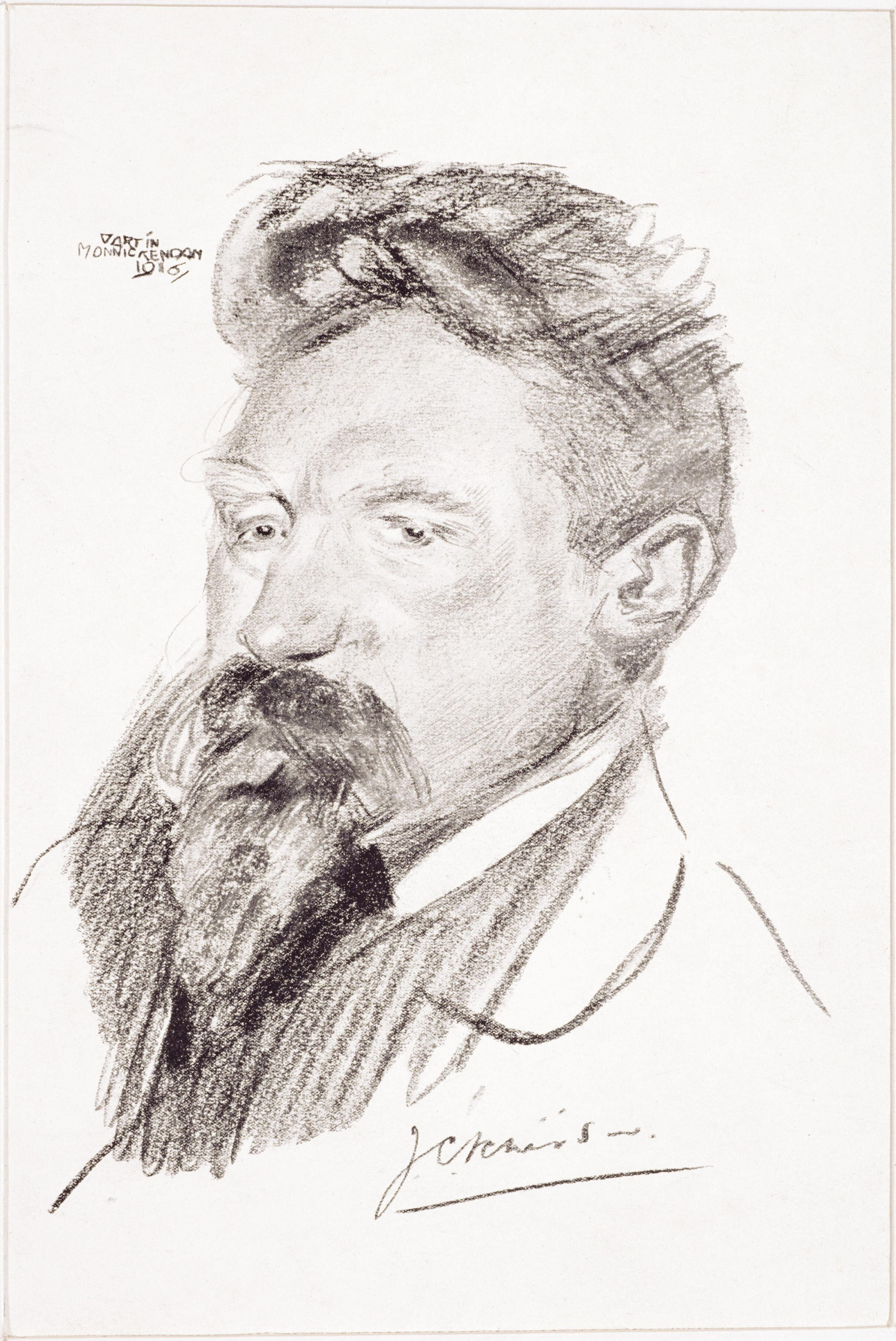
- Schröder (drawing from 1916)

Personal information
- Full name: Johan Christiaan Schröder
- Date of birth: 11 September 1871
- Place of birth: Amsterdam, Netherlands
- Date of death: 18 December 1938 (aged 67)
- Place of death: Wassenaar, Netherlands
- Position: Midfielder

Senior career*
Years	Team	Apps	(Gls)
1892–1900	RAP		

International career
1894	Netherlands unofficial team	2	(0)
- * Club domestic league appearances and goals

Johan Christiaan Schröder, also known as Kick Schröder (11 September 1871 – 18 December 1938), was a Dutch footballer who played as a midfielder for RAP and the Netherlands national team (unofficial) in the early 1890s. He later served as the editor-in-chief of De Telegraaf, being regarded by some as one of the most important journalists of the early 20th century.

== Early life ==
Johan Schröder was born in Amsterdam on 11 September 1871, as the son of a German couple, his father being from Hannover, and his mother from Leer.

== Playing career ==
We were still in the carefree youth of football, without stately stands, without treasurers with bank balances, and without trainers. We kicked like we were dressed, knocked each other over, helped each other up, sometimes forgot the ball for the pleasure of a heavy collision. That's how we played football, enjoyed it more than the handful of spectators.

— Schröder recalling the first unofficial Dutch match in 1924.

At some point in the early 1890s, Schröder joined the ranks of RAP, where he quickly established himself as the team's captain, thus earning the nickname Cap (short for captain), with both his captaincy and playing style being characterized as very tough. On 6 February 1894, he captained the Netherlands' first-ever unofficial international match against the English side Felixstowe United, which ended in a 0–1 loss, but such was the English supremacy at the time that this was still an incredible result. He also played in the team's second match on 10 April 1894 against Maidstone FC on the field of the HFC, leading his side to a 4–3 win.

Under his leadership, RAP became the first Dutch club to win the double in 1899, having won both the league and the cup, in which they defeated HVV. As the captain of the winner, Schröder received the trophy from the hands of its donor Hak Holdert, with whom he would later work at the Telegraaf.

At the time, Schröder was already a journalist, so he often wrote articles on the matches in which he had played, giving himself good reviews, and despite them being often justified, it is clearly not the best example of independent sports journalism. Before the 1899 Cup final, he wrote about how the scheduled venue for the final had been changed at the last-minute, published in De Athleet, stating it was "a circumstance that of course had a very disadvantageous effect".

Schröder also played cricket, reaching a level of international class, being valued even in England.

== Journalistic career ==
In 1905, Schröder became the editor-in-chief of De Telegraaf after accepting an offer from his friend Holdert, the president of the newspaper, which at that time still had a limited circulation. In November 1915, the editor-in-chief Schröder was accused by the government of high treason for insults to Germany ("a group of unscrupulous villains who caused this war"), and was even arrested and taken into custody on 4 December, but he was released two weeks later, on 21 December, being acquitted a few months later. Holdert deliberately waited with the exculpatory statement until he had made enough publicity capital from the affair, thus making Schröder a martyr of free speech, and likewise, when he was released two weeks later, a large crowd awaited Schröder at the prison gate to accompany him on his triumphal march to his wife and children. Louis Raemaekers, the cartoonist of De Telegraaf, also played a key role in this storyline, since his fiercely dramatic cartoons were confiscated several times and he, along with Holdert and Schröder, was called for several trials by Minister John Loudon.

In 1923, three-quarters of the editorial staff, including editor-in-chief Schröder, resigned from De Telegraaf to join businessman Willem Broekhuijs, who wanted to publish a new newspaper, De Dag, which ended up never coming to fruition, so the editorial staff returned to De Telegraaf in the summer.

== Death ==
Schröder died in Wassenaar on 18 December 1938, at the age of 67, from a heart attack.

== Honours ==
AVV RAP

- Dutch Championship:
  - Champions (2): 1898, 1899
- KNVB Cup:
  - Champions (1): 1899
- Coupe Van der Straeten Ponthoz:
  - Champions (1):1900
