= Freek Kampschreur =

Dutch footballer

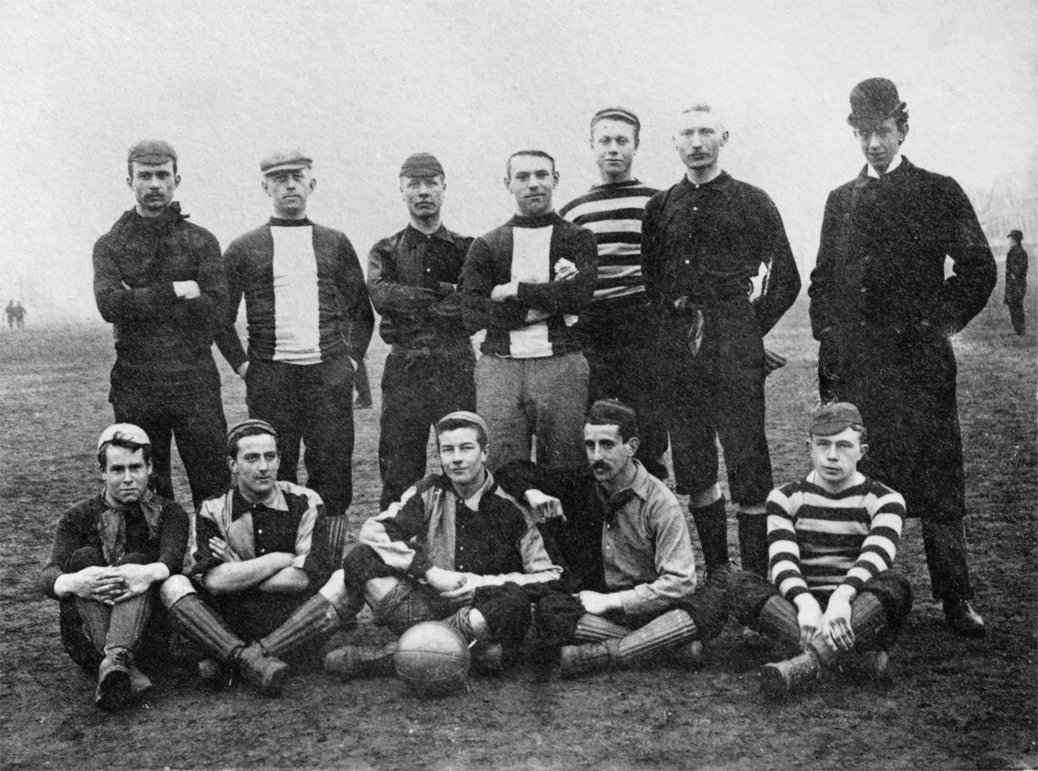
- Kampschreur (front, 2nd from left) with the Dutch national team against Felixstowe, 1894

Personal information
- Place of birth: Netherlands
- Position: Forward

Senior career*
Years	Team	Apps	(Gls)
1892–1896	Sparta Rotterdam		
1896–1901	RAP		

International career
1894	Netherlands unofficial team	1	(0)
- * Club domestic league appearances and goals

Freek Kampschreur was a Dutch footballer who played as a forward for Sparta Rotterdam and RAP. He played a crucial role in helping the latter club to win the very first international club trophy in European football in 1900, the Coupe Van der Straeten Ponthoz.

== Club career ==
Little is known about his early life, but apparently, Kampschreur started his sporting career in cricket, playing for the Sparta Cricket team around the early 1890s. On 18 December 1892, Kampschreur scored 9 of Sparta's 17 goals in a win over the Amersfoortsche FC by 17–0, which still is a record result for a Dutch league match; and his nine-goal haul is still a joint-record in the Netherlands. On 18 March 1893, Kampschreur started for Sparta against Harwich & Parkeston F.C. of England, the very first time that a British club played football in the Netherlands. Kampschreur also played in the return fixture in Parkeston on 1 April, with both games ending in losses. On 23 April 1893, Kampschreur helped his club achieve promotion to the highest league of Dutch football.

Kampschreur was Sparta's joint top-scorer in the 1893–94 season, which ended in a fourth-place finish, although they remained undefeated from January until the end of the season. He was Sparta's top scorer for the second consecutive time in the 1895–96 season, which ended in a third-place finish. In the summer of 1896 or 1897, Kampschreur left Sparta to join national rivals RAP. He then helped the club win the 1897–98 West Division, four points clear of second-place Sparta. In the national championship play-off against the Eastern champions Vitesse, he scored his side's third goal in a 4–2 victory, although some reports say that the four goals were all scored by Jan Hisgen.

In the following season, Kampschreur was a member of the RAP squad that became the first team in the Netherlands to win the double, the 1898–99 Championship and the 1898–99 KNVB Cup, featuring in the latter's final as RAP beat HVV Den Haag 1–0 after extra-time. In the following year, in 1900, he was part of the RAP side that participated in the first edition of the Coupe Van der Straeten Ponthoz, which is regarded by many as the first-ever European club trophy. The tournament was held in Brussels and on 15 April, in the first round, Kampschreur scored the winner in a 2–1 victory over the champions of Belgium, Racing Club de Bruxelles. On the following day, in the semifinals, he netted another goal, this time in a 3–2 win over the champions of Switzerland, Grasshopper Club. Finally, in the final on 17 April, RAP faced fellow Dutch club HVV, and even though HVV were the favourites to win, Kampschreur helped his team make a comeback and win the title with a 2–1 victory, thus lifting the first international club trophy in European football.

== International career ==
Kampschreur was one of the eleven footballers who started in the Netherlands' first-ever unofficial international match on 6 February 1894 against the English side Felixstowe United, which ended in a 0–1 loss, but such was the English supremacy at the time that this was still an incredible result. According to the chronicles of the match, Kampschreur "almost scored, but was not sharp enough in the finish".

== Honours ==
AVV RAP

- Dutch Championship: 1898, 1899
- KNVB Cup: 1899
- Coupe Van der Straeten Ponthoz: 1900
