= 1902–03 KNVB Cup =

Tournament details
- Country: The Netherlands
- Dates: 2 November 1902 – 29 March 1903
- Teams: 38

Final positions
- Champions: HVV Den Haag (1st title)
- Runner-up: HBS Craeyenhout

Tournament statistics
- Matches played: 37
- Goals scored: 229 (6.19 per match)

The 1901–02 KNVB Cup was the 5th staging of the KNVB Cup. The cup was won by HFC Haarlem, beating HBS Craeyenhout 2–1 in the final.

== Format ==
All ties were played in one game, and if the result was a draw, two extra periods of 7½ minutes were played to determine the winner. If there was no winner after that, another extra period of two extra periods of 7½ minutes was played, and if there was still no decision after that, the game was replayed on the opponent's pitch, and if the draw persisted, then the game goes into extra time until a goal was scored.

Despite being a second division team, Amsterdam's Volharding once again reached the semifinals for the second time.

== Results ==
=== First round ===
Team 1	Score	Team 2
EDO Amsterdam	1–2	Olympia Middelburg
HFC Haarlem	5–3	EFC Prinses Wilhelmina
Rapiditas Rotterdam	2–5	RAP Amsterdam
DSV Concordia Delft	2–1 (E.T.)	Swift Amsterdam
Achilles Rotterdam	0–2	Quick Amsterdam
Celeritas Rotterdam	2–6	BVV Wilhelmina
NOAD Breda	1–0	DSVV Ouwe Schoen
Rapiditas Rotterdam II	0–9	UC & VV Hercules
FCC Antoni Oss	0–14	Dordrechtsche FC
Sparta Rotterdam	2–1 (E.T.)	Saturnus Rotterdam
Steeds Voorwaarts	0–4	Quick Den Haag
HBS Craeyenhout	7–1	Olympia Rotterdam
AFC Quick 1890	9–0	SEVIOS Amsterdam
Unitas Rotterdam	4–0	HVV Den Haag II
Go Ahead Wageningen	5–0	AVV Amsterdam
Vitesse Arnheim	3–1	Volharding Amsterdam
EFC Prinses Wilhelmina II	0–11	HVV Den Haag
RVV Rotterdam	3–0	HFC Haarlem II
Zwolsche AC	1–6	Koninklijke HFC

=== Intermediate round ===
Team 1	Score	Team 2
AFC Quick 1890	2–1	Sparta Rotterdam
Dordrechtsche FC	5–0	BVV Wilhelmina
RVV Rotterdam	2–3	Quick Amsterdam

Notes: BVV Wilhelmina withdrew. Furthermore, the result of the match between RVV Rotterdam and Quick Amsterdam on 9 November 1902 was declared invalid after a protest.

=== Second round ===
Team 1	Score	Team 2
Unitas Rotterdam	0–3	Go Ahead Wageningen
AFC Quick 1890	2–9	HBS Craeyenhout
HFC Haarlem	6–2	Quick Den Haag
HVV Den Haag	7–1	UC & VV Hercules
Olympia Middelburg	1–6	Koninklijke HFC
RAP Amsterdam	16–0	DSV Concordia Delft
NOAD Breda	7–0	Quick Amsterdam
Dordrechtsche FC	0–4	Vitesse Arnheim

=== Quarter-finals ===
Team 1	Score	Team 2
HFC Haarlem	4–1	Koninklijke HFC
HBS Craeyenhout	4–1	Vitesse Arnheim
HVV Den Haag	3–2 (E.T.)	RAP Amsterdam
Go Ahead Wageningen	4–8	NOAD Breda

=== Semifinal ===
Team 1	Score	Team 2
NOAD Breda	2–4 (E.T.)	HVV Den Haag
HFC Haarlem	1–3	HBS Craeyenhout

=== Final ===
The final, which took place on 8 May in Heemstede, was contested by HBS Craeyenhout, the 1901 champions and 1902 runner-ups, and HVV Den Haag, who struggled in the semifinals against the second division team NOAD Breda, but ultimately won in extra-time, thus setting up a The Hague derby.

The first goal of the match was scored by HBS's Van den Berg, but on the wrong net, with Den Haag doubling their lead shortly after, via their star player John Heyning. Even though HBS managed to cut down the deficit thanks to Van den Broeck d'Obrenau, the HVV team then scored a further four goals in the second-half to seal a resounding 6–1 victory, which came from Dirk Lotsij and the Sol brothers (John and Eetje).

8 May 1902
Final

HVV Den Haag	6 – 1	HBS Craeyenhout
Van den Berg 1–0' (o.g.); J. Heyning 2–0'; Lotsy 3–1'; J. Sol 4–1'; E. Sol 5–1'; G. Heyning Coops; Mundt, W. Hupkes; A. Kessler, J. Sol, K. Heyting; Sillevis, E. Sol, D. Lotsy, J. Heyning, G. Heyning	Report	Van den Broeck d'Obrenau 2–1' Koopman; Van der Krap, De Wit; Van den Berg, Kamperdijk, Van Lier; Soesman, Van den Broeck d'Obrenau, Bekker, Canneel, Gentis

De Diepput, Den Haag, Netherlands
Referee: JLF de Meijere
