= 1900–01 KNVB Cup =

Tournament details
- Country: The Netherlands
- Dates: 4 November 1900 – 28 April 1901
- Teams: 25

Final positions
- Champions: HBS Craeyenhout (1st title)
- Runner-up: RAP Amsterdam

Tournament statistics
- Matches played: 26
- Goals scored: 124 (4.77 per match)

The 1900–01 KNVB Cup was the 3rd staging of the KNVB Cup. The cup was won by HBS Craeyenhout, beating RAP Amsterdam 4–3 in the final.

== Format ==
All ties were played in one game, and if the result was a draw, two extra periods of 7½ minutes were played to determine the winner. If there was no winner after that, another extra period of two extra periods of 7½ minutes was played, and if there was still no decision after that, the game was replayed on the opponent's pitch, and if the draw persisted, then the game goes into extra time until a goal was scored.

== Results ==
=== First round ===
==== District 1 ====
Team 1	Score	Team 2
EFC Prinses Wilhelmina	3–1	Swift Amsterdam
Volharding Amsterdam	3–2 (E.T.)	Vitesse Arnheim
AFC Quick 1890	2–1	AVV Amsterdam

==== District 2 ====
Team 1	Score	Team 2
Quick Amsterdam	6–1	Hollandia Den Haag
RAP Amsterdam	2–1	Steeds Voorwaarts
EDO Amsterdam	1–1 (E.T.)	Koninklijke HFC
Koninklijke HFC	3–2	EDO Amsterdam

==== District 3 ====
Team 1	Score	Team 2
HBS Craeyenhout	4–1	Ajax Leiden
HVV Den Haag	12–0	Quick Den Haag
DSV Concordia Delft	0–3	HFC Haarlem

==== District 4 ====
Team 1	Score	Team 2
Rapiditas Rotterdam	3–2 (E.T.)	Olympia Rotterdam
Achilles Rotterdam	1–2	Celeritas Rotterdam
Olympia Middelburg	0–3	Dordrechtsche FC
CVV Velocitas Breda	Bye	

=== Second round ===
Team 1	Score	Team 2
AFC Quick 1890	4–0	EFC Prinses Wilhelmina
Quick Amsterdam	1–5	Koninklijke HFC
HBS Craeyenhout	5–4	HVV Den Haag
Rapiditas Rotterdam	2–1	CVV Velocitas Breda
Celeritas Rotterdam	1–2	Dordrechtsche FC
Volharding Amsterdam	Bye	
RAP Amsterdam	Bye	
HFC Haarlem	Bye	

Note: The result between Celeritas Rotterdam and CVV Velocitas Breda on 2 December 1900 was declared invalid, with the match being replayed five weeks later.

=== Quarter-final ===
Team 1	Score	Team 2
HFC Haarlem	2–1 (E.T.)	Rapiditas Rotterdam
Volharding Amsterdam	0–0 (E.T.)	AFC Quick 1890
HBS Craeyenhout	2–1	Koninklijke HFC
Dordrechtsche FC	1–3 (E.T.)	RAP Amsterdam
Volharding Amsterdam	6–2	AFC Quick 1890

Note:The match between AC & VV Volharding and AFC Quick 1890 on 3 March 1901 was abandoned with the score at 4–1, being rescheduled for two weeks later.

=== Semifinal ===
Team 1	Score	Team 2
HBS Craeyenhout	6–2	HFC Haarlem
RAP Amsterdam	6–0	Volharding Amsterdam

=== Final ===
The final, which took place on 28 April in Haarlem, was contested by RAP Amsterdam, the winners of the 1899 edition, and HBS Craeyenhout, who immediately attacked in search of the opening goal, which they achieved thanks to Bekker, who took advantage of "the unforgivable procrastination of the RAP defense". RAP was quick to reply, equalising via a beautiful shot from Freek Kampschreur, taking the lead in the second-half thanks to Hartoch, and then creating two good chances to make it 3–1, but they failed to convert them, which allowed HBS to equalize with another goal from Bekker. After both teams scored one more goal to make it 3–3, HBS scored the winner in the 80th minute to seal a 4–3 victory.

After the referee whistled for the end of the 90 minutes, RAP filed an official protest against the second goal of HBS, because the goal was allegedly made by handball. At the time, the regulations said that extra-time had to be added in case the protest is granted, but no more goals were scored in this extra time. Two weeks later, the protest committee rejected RAP's protest, the goal counts, and HBS is thus awarded the Holdert Cup. The Dutch newspaper Algemeen Dagblad later stated that "According to many, the battle was much more important and beautiful than any of the international matches in The Hague".

28 April 1901
Final

HBS Craeyenhout	4 – 3 (a.e.t.)	RAP Amsterdam
Bekker 1–0', 2–2'; Meijer 3–3'; Lagerwey 4–3'	Report	Kampschreur 1–1'; Hartoch 1–2'; Glaser 2–3'

Koekamp, Haarlem, Netherlands
Referee: Coster
