= Jan van den Berg (footballer) =

Dutch footballer (1879–1951)

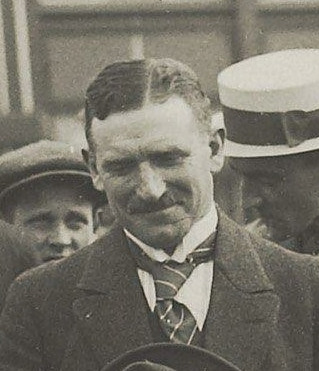
- Van den Berg in 1918

Personal information
- Full name: Johannes Jacobus van den Berg
- Date of birth: 22 August 1879
- Place of birth: Haarlem, Netherlands
- Date of death: 21 December 1951 (aged 72)
- Place of death: Zandvoort, Netherlands
- Position: Striker

Senior career*
Years	Team	Apps	(Gls)
1896-1904	Haarlem		

International career
1898–1904	Netherlands ("Van Hasselt XI")	5	(2)
1908	Netherlands	0	(0)
- * Club domestic league appearances and goals

Olympic medal record

Men's Football
Bronze medal – third place	1908 London	Team competition

Johannes Jacobus "Jan" van den Berg (22 August 1879 in Haarlem – 21 December 1951 in Zandvoort) was a Dutch footballer who spent his entire career at HFC Haarlem. He was one of Haarlem's greatest club icons, being the big name at the club in the first 50 years, Haarlem's first (unofficial) international and (honorary) chairman of the club. He was also a member of the Dutch football squad that competed in the 1908 Summer Olympics, but he did not play in any matches.

== Biography ==
Jan van den Berg was born in Haarlem in 1879, to a father who owned stables, hotels and a café “Neuf”, which later became a hotel with the name “Centraal”, it was also the residence of the family. The van den Berg family also owned hotel “de Leeuwerik” in the Kruisstraat, which was the clubhouse of HFC Haarlem until the 1960s. Jan began his career at his hometown club HFC Haarlem, making his debut on 24 November 1895, aged just 16, against AFC Quick 1890, netting Haarlem's only goal of the game. Since then, he scored a total of 130 goals for the club. He was a pure striker, sometimes referred to as "a real football animal" due to his always-present hunger for more goals.

In 1900 van den Berg participated in the first edition of the Coupe Van der Straeten Ponthoz, which is regarded by many as the first-ever European club trophy, playing for RAP as a guest player. The tournament was held in Brussels and on 15 April, in the first round, van den Berg scored a goal in a 2–1 win over the champions of Belgium, Racing Club de Bruxelles. On the following day, in the semi-finals, van den Berg nets twice against the champions of Switzerland, Grasshopper Club, including the winning goal in a 3–2 victory. Finally, in the final on 17 April, RAP faced fellow Dutch club HVV, who had succeeded RAP as the new champions of the Netherlands by winning the championship in 1899–1900. HVV were the favorites to win as they had trashed the hosts Léopold FC with a resounding 8–1 win in the first round and then comfortably got past the semi-finals with a 3–0 win. Furthermore, HVV had great national figures of that time such as Willem Hesselink, Miel Mundt, and Johan Sol. HVV scored early in the first half but the Amsterdammers fought back and van den Berg found an equalizer with just 10 minutes to go. It seemed he had just forced extra-time, however, just 5 minutes later, they found the winner thanks to Julius Hisgen, so he contributed decisively to help RAP lift the first trophy of the competition.

In 1902 he helped the club win the KNVB Cup, beating HBS Craeyenhout 2–1 in the final. He lost his starting position in 1904 due to a chronic knee injury, so he was dropped from the first team, but remained loyal to the club. Seven years later, in the 1911–12 season, he was the regular goalkeeper of the first team for a while after the original keeper, Jules Utermark, left for Singapore. In that same season, Haarlem won its second KNVB Cup title, this time beating Vitesse 2–0 in the final.

== International career ==
In 1898 he was the first player of HFC Haarlem to play in the then unofficial Dutch national team. In 1899 he scored the only Dutch goal in a 1–6 loss to England. In the infamous unofficial Dutch-Belgian meetings of 1901–04, van den Berg netted again on 3 January 1904 in a 4–6 loss to Belgium. In total, Jan played five matches and scored 2 goals with the unofficial Dutch national team, but when the official Dutch team was finally formed in 1905, van den Berg was no longer in his best form and never managed to earn a single cap for the main national side.

Van den Berg was a member of the Dutch squad that competed in the football tournament of the 1908 Summer Olympics, but he failed to feature in a single game as the Netherlands won bronze after beating Sweden (3–1) in the third place match, thus missing out on the chance to become the first-ever HFC Haarlem player to be an Olympic medalist as he was not awarded a bronze medal due to have not played.

== Executive career ==
Van den Berg was a board member of the KNVB between 1904 and 1909. He was a good speed skater on the 500 and 1500 meters speed skate, a champion of Haarlem in bowling, and also won prizes in equestrian sport. For HFC Haarlem, in addition to being a footballer, he was also an excellent sprinter in the club's athletics branch and captain of the cricket team.

He was awarded the title of honorary president of the club in 1920, becoming its honorary chairman together with Jaap van Balen Blanken and Henk Hut. He was director of the Olympic Stadium during the 1928 Olympic Games in Amsterdam and until 1947, when the club's current stadium, Haarlem Stadion, was opened by him in 1948. Van den Berg remained a member of HFC Haarlem for the rest of his life and the savior through which the club survived. He saw the club become the national champion in 1946.

== Personal life ==
His brothers who died very young were also very involved in the club. His brother André was the founder of the cricket and field hockey branch of Haarlem, which still exists under the names "Cricketclub Bloemendaal" and top club "HC Bloemendaal"; he died in 1916 only 33 years old from meningitis. On the other hand, brother Chef died in 1920 at the age of 30 in a car accident. Jan van den Berg died on 21 December 1951 in Zandvoort. If there is a Haarlemmer who still deserves a place in the “Hall of Fame” at the Kennemer Sportcentre, it's the honorary chairman.

== Honours ==
=== Club ===
HFC Haarlem

- KNVB Cup:
  - Champions (2): 1901–02 and 1911–12

AVV RAP

- Coupe Van der Straeten Ponthoz:
  - Champions (1): 1900
