= Jan Hisgen =

Dutch footballer

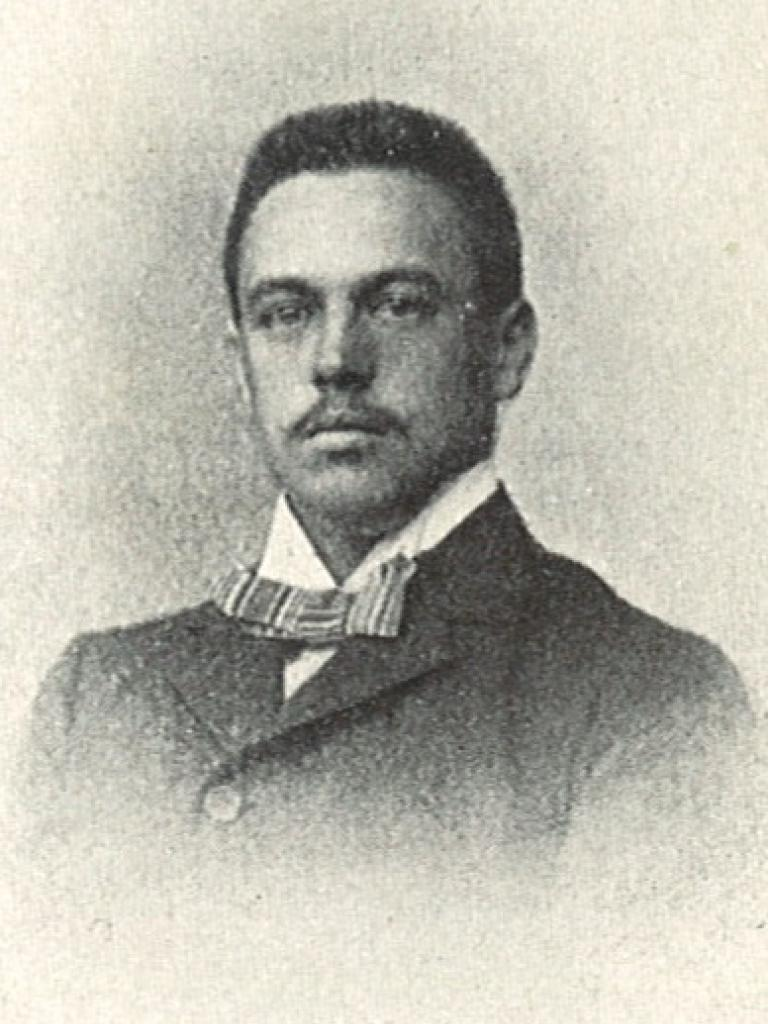
- Hisgen

Personal information
- Full name: Julius Heinrich Hisgen
- Date of birth: 31 August 1875
- Place of birth: Utrecht, Netherlands
- Date of death: 5 October 1957 (aged 82)
- Place of death: Amsterdam, Netherlands
- Position: Forward

Senior career*
Years	Team	Apps	(Gls)
1896–1901	RAP		
- * Club domestic league appearances and goals

Jan Hisgen (31 August 1875 - 5 October 1957) was a Dutch photographer, cricket player and footballer who played as a forward for RAP at the turn of the century. He played a crucial role in helping the club win the first KNVB Cup in 1899 and the first-ever international club trophy in European football in 1900, the Coupe Van der Straeten Ponthoz, scoring the winner in both finals.

== Club career ==
Little is known about his life; Hisgen joined the ranks of RAP at some point in the mid to late 1890s, helping the club win the 1897–98 West Division, four points clear of second-place Sparta. In the national championship play-off against the Eastern champions Vitesse, he scored a hat-trick to help his side to a 4–2 victory, although some reports say that the four goals were all scored by Hisgen.

In the following season, Hisgen was a member of the RAP squad that became the first team in the Netherlands to win the double, the 1898–99 Championship and the 1898–99 KNVB Cup; in the latter's final, he scored the only goal of the match in extra-time to seal a 1–0 victory over HVV Den Haag. In the following year, in 1900, he was part of the RAP side that participated in the first edition of the Coupe Van der Straeten Ponthoz, which is regarded by many as the first-ever European club trophy. The tournament was held in Brussels, and in the final on 17 April, Hisgen once again scored the winner for RAP against HVV to seal a 2–1 victory, thus lifting the first international club trophy in European football.

In that same year, Hisgen also helped RAP win the Coupe Glorieux in Liège, which involved many leading English clubs.

He was also a great cricket player and played from 1900 until 1927 at Volharding.

== Later life ==
On 31 January 1947, Hisgen was visited and interviewed by PJ Linder of the magazine Sportief.

== Legacy ==
As a tribute to the author of the winning goal of the 1899 KNVB Cup, a street in Amsterdam-Noord was named after him, the JH Hisgenpad.

== Honours ==
AVV RAP

- Dutch Championship:
  - Champions (2): 1898, 1899
- KNVB Cup:
  - Champions (1):1899
- Coupe Van der Straeten Ponthoz:
  - Champions (1):1900
