= 1902–03 in Belgian football =

Football in Belgium
- Season: 1902–03

The 1902–03 season was the eighth competitive season in Belgian football.

== Overview ==
Only one official division existed at the time, split into two leagues. It was called Coupe de Championnat (Championship Cup) and its winner was decided after a final round between the first two of each league. The season was not completed.

Olympia Club de Bruxelles and Daring Club de Bruxelles were admitted to the league at the end of the season while Verviers F.C. merged with Stade Wallon de Verviers to become C.S. Verviétois.

== Honour ==
Competition	Winner
Championship Cup	Racing Club de Bruxelles

== League standings ==
=== Championship Cup A ===
Pos	Team	Pld	Won	Drw	Lst	GF	GA	Pts	GD	Notes
1	Beerschot A.C.	7	5	2	0	24	12	12	+12	Qualified for Final Group
2	Léopold Club de Bruxelles	7	5	1	1	18	8	11	+10	Qualified for Final Group
3	C.S. Brugeois	7	2	0	5	9	21	4	-12	
4	Antwerp F.C.	4	1	1	2	8	7	3	+1	
5	F.C. Brugeois	7	1	0	6	7	18	2	-11	

=== Championship Cup B ===
Pos	Team	Pld	Won	Drw	Lst	GF	GA	Pts	GD	Notes
1	Union Saint-Gilloise	8	7	0	1	40	13	14	+27	Qualified for Final Group
2	Racing Club de Bruxelles	8	6	0	2	25	7	12	+18	Qualified for Final Group
3	Athletic and Running Club de Bruxelles	7	3	0	4	20	26	6	-6	
4	F.C. Liégeois	7	3	0	4	16	25	6	-9	
5	Verviers F.C.	8	0	0	8	7	37	0	-30	^{[Note 1]}

^{[Note 1]} Merged with Stade Wallon de Verviers to become C.S. Verviétois.

=== Final round ===
Pos	Team	Pld	Won	Drw	Lst	GF	GA	Pts	GD	Notes
1	Racing Club de Bruxelles	6	5	1	0	12	4	11	+8	
2	Union Saint-Gilloise	6	3	0	3	6	8	6	-2	
3	Beerschot A.C.	6	2	2	2	5	8	6	-3	
4	Léopold Club de Bruxelles	6	0	1	5	2	5	1	-3	
