= Cees van Hasselt =

Dutch footballer and manager

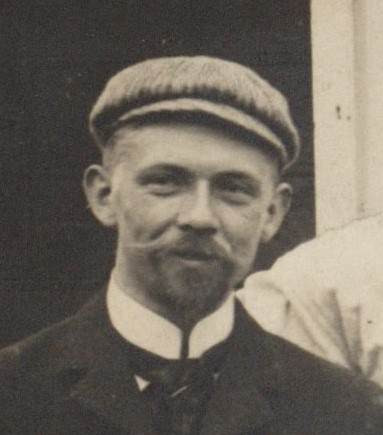
- Van Hasselt pictured on 30 April 1905

Personal information
- Full name: Cornelis Wilhelmus van Hasselt
- Date of birth: 5 October 1872
- Place of birth: Rotterdam, Netherlands
- Date of death: 16 January 1951 (aged 78)
- Place of death: Rotterdam, Netherlands
- Position: Defender

Senior career*
Years	Team	Apps	(Gls)
1893–1905	Sparta Rotterdam		

International career
1894–1898	Netherlands (unofficial)	6	(0)

Managerial career
- 1901–1904: Netherlands ("Van Hasselt XI")
- 1905–1908: Netherlands
- * Club domestic league appearances and goals

Cornelis Wilhelmus van Hasselt (5 October 1872 – 16 January 1951) was a Dutch footballer and manager, who coached the Netherlands national team from its first unofficial matches in 1901 until 1908.

== Playing career ==
Van Hasselt played for his hometown club Sparta Rotterdam from 1893 to 1905. He was a part-time Sparta player and full-time Rotterdam tailor. Van Hasselt played six times for an early Dutch representative side, playing friendlies against European club teams in the late 19th century.

Between 1894 and 1896, van Hasselt played for the Netherlands in four unofficial matches against English clubs, including a 3–3 draw with Felixstowe FC on 3 December 1894, a 1–2 loss to Maidstone FC on 31 March 1895, a 9–2 win over Saxmundham FC on 18 November, and a 2–3 loss to the English Wanderers on 12 April 1896. In his fifth cap, van Hasselt scored an own goal in the 5th minute in an eventual 2–6 loss to the English Wanderers on 28 March 1897. On 10 April 1898, the 26-year-old van Hasselt played his sixth and last unofficial appearance for the Netherlands, helped his side to a 7–0 win over the English Wanderers.

== Managerial career ==
=== Unofficial matches (1901–04) ===
In 1901, the Antwerp football director Frédéric Vanden Abeele personally hired van Hasselt as a last resort attempt to assemble a Dutch team that could play against a Belgium squad for the so-called Coupe Vanden Abeele. Van Hasselt was able to do so mainly thanks to help of his friend Jirris, the captain of Rotterdam club side Celeritas, a club from a third-level competition, whose squad was then strengthened by three players from another Rotterdam club, Olympia, which was also a third-level side. The Dutch unsurprisingly lost 0–8 to the much more superior Belgian team, but since the Dutch national team was only made-up of players born in Rotterdam, and since the match was not yet played under the auspices of the Royal Dutch Football Association (KNVB), it is considered unofficial.

Van Hasselt then organized a further three unofficial friendly cup games against Belgium, but as a result of the games not being sanctioned by the KNVB, only players from the second division were available to Van Hasselt, so Belgium also won those three editions, although with more leveled scores (1–0, 2–1 and 6–4). In the second edition of the Coupe Vanden Abeele on 5 January 1902, Hendrik van Heuckelum, who had played and scored for the Belgian squad at the 1900 Olympic Games in Paris, failed to turn up, so the 29-year-old van Hasselt, who did not play actively anymore except for occasional matches with the "Sparta Ruïne" (a team for former Sparta players), had to put on his own boots in an eventual 0–1 loss.

=== Official matches (1905–08) ===
In 1904, the KNVB became a founding member of FIFA, and on 30 April 1905, the Netherlands played their first official international game, beating Belgium 4–1 in Antwerp, Belgium. Van Hasselt managed the Dutch national team for ten more games, winning five and losing five, including two heavy defeats at the hands of England amateurs, both in 1907, losing the latter 12–2, which still is the heaviest defeat in the history of the Netherlands national team. In his last match against France on 10 May 1908, the Netherlands won 4–1 in Rotterdam, just a few months before the London Olympics.

Ahead of the 1908 Olympic Games in London, the KNVB thought the time had come for an experienced English manager, so Van Hasselt was replaced by Edgar Chadwick. Incidentally, this is also regarded by a number of football experts as the first national coach, since they see Van Hasselt as more of a benevolent amateur than a real coach.

== Later life ==
In addition to his activities in sports, Van Hasselt was also active in all kinds of other fields. After the First World War, he started the art dealership Huize van Hasselt together with his son Johannes Hendrikus. They organized the first exhibition of the progressive Rotterdam artist group De Branding and also paid a lot of attention to modern German art. In preparation for the 1937 World Jamboree in the Netherlands, Van Hasselt was responsible for renting out the spaces for shops and restaurants on the market square. Before the Second World War, Van Hasselt was also the organizer of the large flower exhibition Prima Vera, which took place in the Nenijto hall, and attracted thousands of visitors to Rotterdam. In 1938, the seventh edition of the flower exhibition was officially opened by Minister of Economic Affairs Max Steenberghe.

Cees van Hasselt died from the consequences of a stomach haemorrhage. He was buried in the Crooswijk General Cemetery. In 1999, a street in Rotterdam was named after him, the Kees van Hasseltstraat in the new housing estate in Terbregge.
