= Rein Boomsma =

Dutch footballer

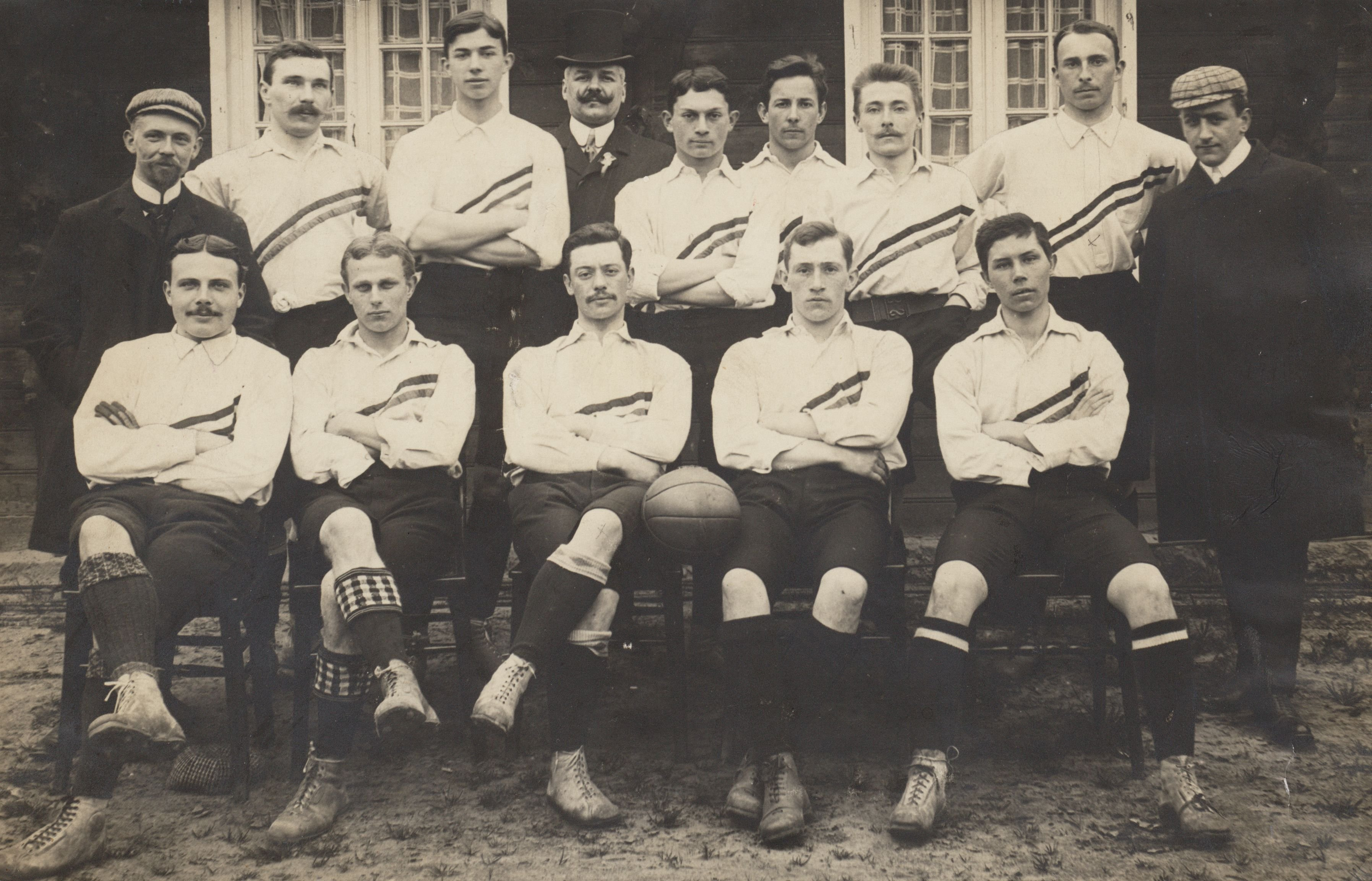
- Netherlands national football team 1905. Boomsma middle man front row

Personal information
- Full name: Reinder Boomsma
- Date of birth: 19 June 1879
- Place of birth: Schagen, Netherlands
- Date of death: 27 May 1943 (aged 63)
- Place of death: Neuengamme concentration camp, German Reich
- Position: Striker

Senior career*
| Years | Team | Apps | (Gls) |
| 1894–1907 | Sparta | | |
- Achilles 1894

International career
| 1905 | Netherlands | 2 | (0) |
- * Club domestic league appearances and goals

Reinder ("Rein") Boomsma (19 June 1879 – 27 May 1943) was a Dutch footballer, who played for Sparta and the Dutch national team.

== Club career ==
Boomsma was born in Schagen, North Holland in 1879, and moved to Rotterdam in 1888. He started to play football on the streets, where he was noticed by Kees van Hasselt. He joined Sparta sometime around 1895. He would remain with the club until his retirement from football in 1907. A year later, in 1908, he was made honorary member of the club.

Boomsma scored the only goal for Sparta in the league game against reigning champions RAP of Amsterdam on 29 October 1899. The match was the first charity game in the Netherlands, held to support the Boer cause in the Second Boer War. The match grossed 1,201 guilders and 51.5 cents.

== International career ==
Boomsma was also part of the first Netherlands national football team, that played against Belgium on 30 April 1905. He also played for the Netherlands in the return match in Rotterdam on 14 May 1905. These would remain the only matches Boomsma played for the Netherlands.

== Army career ==
Boomsma volunteered to join the Royal Netherlands Army on 1 July 1898, and eventually became a Colonel of Infantry in Apeldoorn from 1936-1939. During the mobilisation period in 1939, he was commander of Fortress Holland with the headquarters at Jaarsveld. After the invasion, he became the commander of the Ordedienst for "Gewest Veluwe" in the underground army. The main purpose of this underground army was to maintain contact with the Dutch government in exile in London by means of coded radio transmissions. Because of these activities he was imprisoned 3 times and questioned by the Gestapo. The first time from 28 March 1941 until 19 January 1942 at Scheveningen. The second time from 21 March 1942 until 16 May 1942, again at Scheveningen. The third and final time from October 1942, first imprisoned in Utrecht, then transferred to Vught and finally to Neuengamme concentration camp near Hamburg, Germany where he died on 26 May 1943.

His son, Evert Willem Boomsma, escaped to England on the 6 May 1941 in a stolen Fokker T8W seaplane landing at Broadstairs around 0830hrs. He actually carried with him the secret codes enabling London to communicate with the resistance. Willem remained in UK, serving with No. 320 (Netherlands) Squadron RAF for the remainder of the war and never saw his father again. He returned to the Netherlands in 1951.
