= Willem Hesselink =

Dutch footballer (1878–1973)

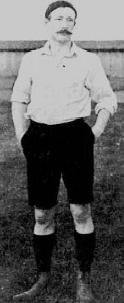

Personal information
- Full name: Willem Frederik Keppel Hesselink
- Date of birth: 8 February 1878
- Place of birth: Arnhem, Netherlands
- Date of death: 15 December 1973 (aged 95)
- Place of death: Bennekom, Netherlands
- Position: Striker

Senior career*
Years	Team	Apps	(Gls)
1892–1899	Vitesse	33+	(20+)
1899–1901	HVV	54	(66)
1901–1905	Vitesse	15+	(4+)
1902–1905	Bayern Munich		
1905–1919	Vitesse	22+	(11+)
Total		124+	(101+)

International career
1905	Netherlands	1	(0)

Managerial career
- 1902–1905: Bayern Munich (player-coach)
- * Club domestic league appearances and goals

Willem Frederik Hesselink (8 February 1878 – 15 December 1973) was a Dutch football player and one of the founders of local club Vitesse in 1892. He was known for his blue woolen cap, which he seemed to wear day and night, and was nicknamed the Cannon due to his fierce shooting, although he was also referred to as the Doctor because of his doctorate in chemistry.

== Career ==
In 1890, Hesselink had been part of an attempt to get a cricket club off the ground in Arnhem and two years later he was one of the founders of Vitesse alongside his brother Herman. Cricket was the initial activity of choice but football took over quickly and Hesselink was soon the star of the team. Hesselink also excelled in athletics, holding several national records including the long jump. A team made up of him and his brothers became national champions in tug of war.

In 1899, he started a chemistry study in Leiden and subsequently made the move to HVV and won the national championship twice. In 1900, Hesselink was a member of the HVV side that participated in the first edition of the Coupe Van der Straeten Ponthoz, regarded by many as the first-ever European club trophy. In the tournament, he scored one goal in the first round in an 8–1 trashing of hosts Léopold FC. He also featured in the final which ended in a 2–1 loss to RAP.

In 1903, Hesselink moved to Munich to study Philosophy and Chemistry and joined FC Bayern Munich. Hesselink became Bayern's first international star. In three years he would grow out to be their star player, manager and chairman. Despite playing for FC Bayern Munich, during the years 1902–1905, he would still regularly play games for Vitesse. In January 1906 Hesselink left Munich, leaving a club that had grown considerably in his time at the helm in the hands of Kurt Müller, and returned to the Netherlands. Hesselink continued his footballing career, rejoining Vitesse and later becoming treasurer and president.

== International career ==
In 1905 Hesselink started in the first-ever home match of the Netherlands national team, a 4–0 victory against Belgium. Some historians attribute one of the goals scored to him.

== Personal life ==
Over the years Hesselink built up a colourful curriculum vitae including doctorates in chemistry and philosophy, becoming director of the Keuringsdienst van Waren, being expert witness in several murder trials, founding a laboratory, and writing several health books.

His thesis on the secrets of Port wine made on the banks of the Douro has proved to stand the tests of time and is still quoted regularly.

He died on the 1st December 1973, aged 95.

== Honours ==
HVV Den Haag

- Dutch championship: 1899–1900, 1900–01
- Coupe Van der Straeten Ponthoz runner-up: 1900
