= Hak Holdert =

Dutch newspaper publisher, printer, and press magnate

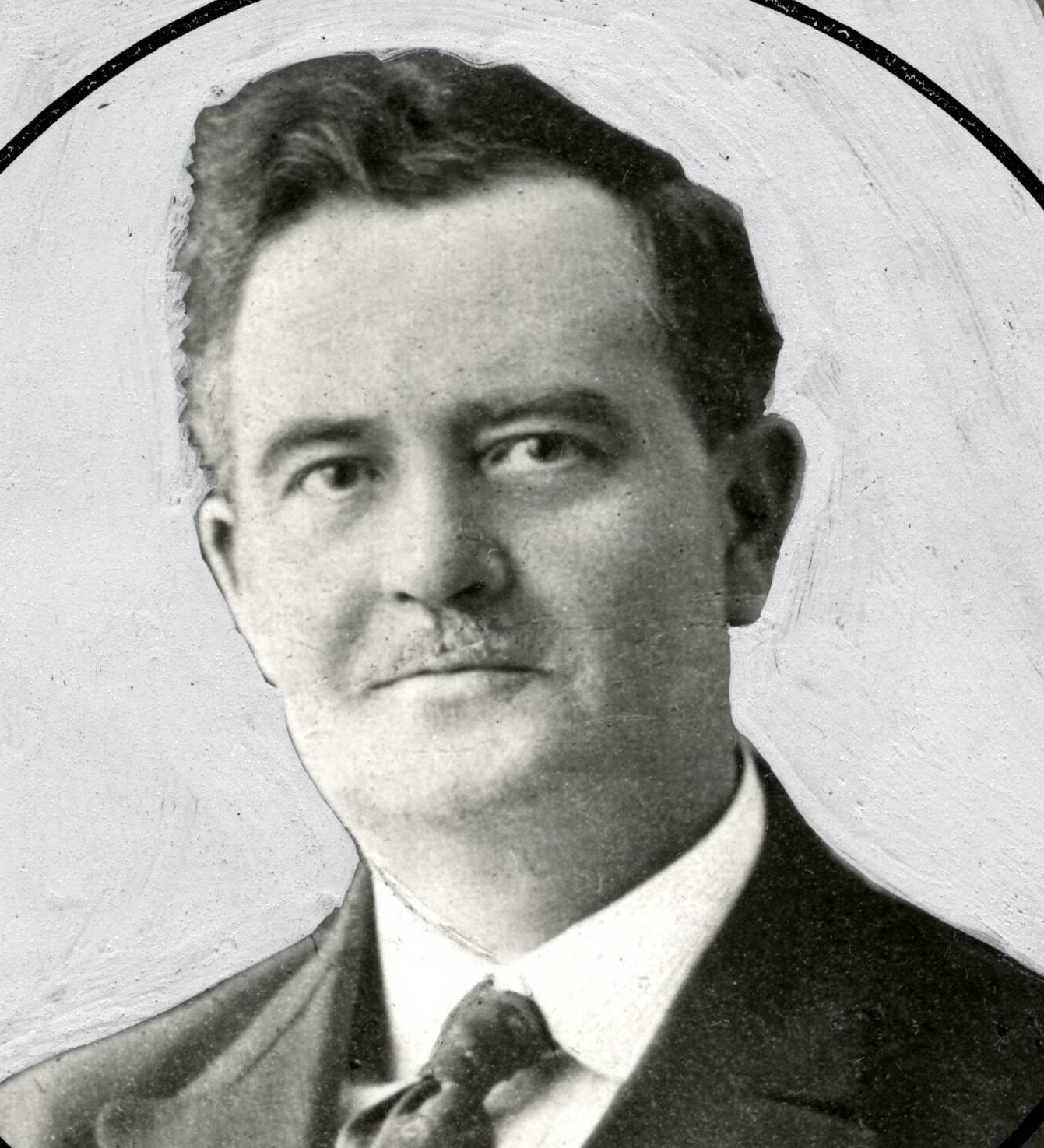
- Holdert around 1925
- Born: Hendrikus Marinus Cornelis Holdert; 4 June 1870; Salatiga, Java, Dutch East Indies
- Died: 21 July 1944 (aged 74); Naarden, Netherlands
- Resting place: Zorgvlied
- Citizenship: Dutch
- Occupations: Publisher; Printer; Sportsperson
- Children: Hakkie Holdert

Hendrikus Marinus Cornelis "Hak" Holdert (4 June 1870 – 21 July 1944) was a Dutch newspaper publisher, printer, and press magnate.

== Early life ==
Hak Holdert was born in Salatiga, Java, on 4 June 1870, as the son of Antonius Hendrikus Holdert and Marie Louise Josephine Platte. After the family was repatriated in 1880, his father and uncle had founded the printing company Holdert en Co in Amsterdam in 1881, which was initially located on the Rokin, but later moved to the Keizersgracht in 1889, going on to become one of the largest printing companies in the capital. Since Hak was seen as a "hopeless case" at the HBS, his father sent him to Germany in 1887, to learn the printing trade, and after initially struggling as a typesetter in Frankfurt, he finally began to mature at the prestigious publishing house Greiner und Pfeiffer in Stuttgart, where he gained knowledge of both the technical and financial aspects of the printing industry.

== Sporting career ==
The first attempt to hold a knock-out competition open to all clubs in the Netherlands was made in 1894, with the winners receiving a trophy offered by Holdert, a former president of V.V.A. (Amsterdam). However, the lack of interest shown by the clubs caused Holdert to withdraw his trophy, so the final between HFC and R.A.P. was canceled, but four years later, in January 1898, Holdert offered another cup, to be contested just like the English FA Cup, and thus the KNVB Cup was conceived. In its first-ever final, held on 9 May 1899 at Koekamp, Heemstede, HVV Den Haag was defeated 1–0 by the RAP Amsterdam, the reigning national champion, whose captain Johan Schröder received the cup from the hands of its donator Holdert, and which now remains in the clubhouse of the Amsterdam club.

== Journalist career ==
=== Early career ===
After gaining technical skills in Germany from 1887 to 1889, Holdert became the manager Holdert en Co, a position that he held until the beginning of 1894, when a dispute with his uncle over his salary led him to start his own printing company, called Elsevier, in a cellar on the Nieuwezijds Voorburgwal. At first, he specialized in printing business cards, particularly for women, with whom he had a natural rapport, and after a few years, the business became profitable, and in 1900, Holdert moved from his basement workshop to a large new printing facility on Van Ostadestraat street.

Encouraged by his success, Holdert ventured into the daily newspaper market, which at the time was a business with plenty of opportunities, not only because of the abolition of the newspaper tax, but also because the demand for news had increased enormously for the purposes of a better education. Two years later, on 12 September 1902, Holdert acquired the daily newspaper De Telegraaf and its subsidiary De Courant, which had been on the brink of collapse following the death of their founder Henry Tindall. Thanks to the financial backing from several investors, Holdert was able to take over the newspapers, revitalized them, expanded the editorial staff with renowned journalists, and transformed them into highly successful daily publications, with De Courant flourishing particularly well due to its lower price, and those profits were then used to financially support De Telegraaf.

Six months later, in April 1903, he bought Amsterdamsche Courant, which was retained as a subtitle under De Telegraaf. At the time, the most popular aspect of De Telegraaf was a children's newspaper published by Dutch writer Pieter Jacob Andriessen, which became so popular that Holdert became afraid that Andriessen would attempt to set up his own business, taking with him the children's newspaper and its subscribers, so to prevent that, Holdert staged a conflict with him in 1903 in order to fire Andriessen, who left in 1904, being replaced by Holdert's childhood friend Johan Schröder, a former football player and a notorious polemicist, who served as the editor-in-chief of De Telegraaf during the early 20th century. De Telegraaf went from 5,412 at the time of the takeover to over 23,000 in 1914, while De Courant went from 10,755 to over 154,000 in that same period.

His greatest strength as a newspaper publisher was not only his good sense of what the general public liked to read, but also his keen business insight and his ability to navigate and influence the newspaper market, particularly through De Courant. He also personally oversaw the editorial direction of his newspapers, with no major editorial decisions being made without his knowledge and approval, even after he relocated to Paris in 1914 and formally transferred management to his brother. His dictatorial management style earned him the reputation of a 'slave driver'. Such was his reputation that the 22 members of the Telegraaf editorial team, a mixture of football friends, socialists, and former anarchists, were convinced that they could be thrown out at the slightest provocation.

=== National hegemony ===
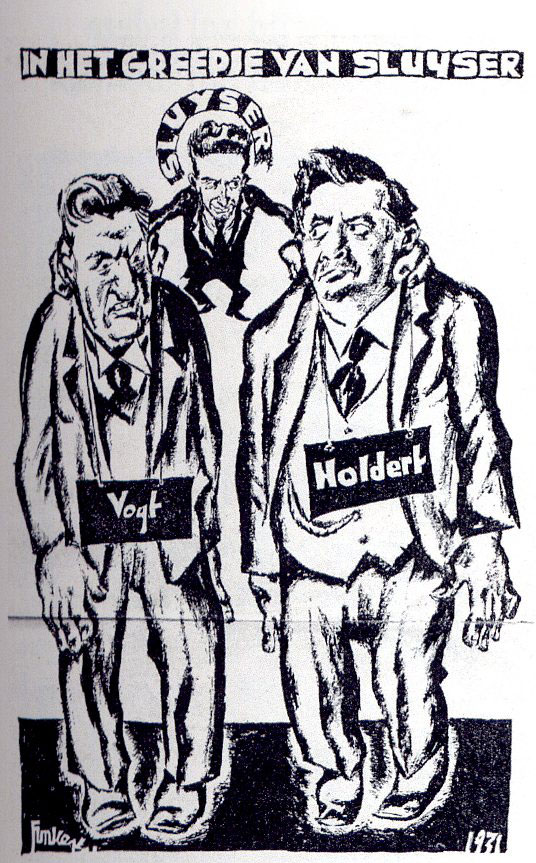
Cartoon by Funke Küpper with journalist Meyer Sluyser who exposes a conspiracy between Holdert's De Telegraaf and Willem Vogt blootlegt.

From the start, Holdert displayed an unbridled urge for expansion, with the flourishing success of De Courant allowing him to acquire several other Amsterdam-based newspapers, which were closed down immediately after being bought, such as the aforementioned Amsterdamsche Courant in 1903, followed by Het Ochtendblad and Amsterdamsch Nieuwsblad in 1905, the Nieuwsblad voor Nederland in 1913, and then De Echo in 1912, which had been co-founded by his father in 1881. De Telegraaf thus soon became the largest newspaper company in the Netherlands.

During the First World War, all newspapers complied with the government's request not to endanger Dutch neutrality sept for De Telegraaf, who took a pro-allied course due to Holdert's French sympathies, which caused the newspaper to be the focus of some controversy, as the Netherlands were usually pro-German at the time. In November 1915, the editor-in-chief Schröder was accused by the government of high treason for insults to Germany ("a group of unscrupulous villains who caused this war"), and was even arrested and taken into custody on 4 December, but he was released two weeks later, on 21 December, being acquitted a few months later. Holdert deliberately waited with the exculpatory statement until he had made enough publicity capital from the affair, thus making Schröder a martyr of free speech, and likewise, when he was released two weeks later, a large crowd awaited Schröder at the prison gate to accompany him on his triumphal march to his wife and children. Louis Raemaekers, the cartoonist of De Telegraaf, also played a key role in this storyline, since his fiercely dramatic cartoons were confiscated several times and he, along with Holdert and Schröder, was called for several trials by Minister John Loudon. After the War, Holdert decided to transform De Telegraaf into a simple popular mass medium, thus getting rid of the left-wing and bohemians members of the editorial team, including Alexander Cohen.

In 1923, three-quarters of the editorial staff, including editor-in-chief Schröder, resigned from De Telegraaf to join businessman Willem Broekhuijs, who wanted to publish a new newspaper, De Dag, which ended up never coming to fruition, so the editorial staff returned to De Telegraaf in the summer.

In 1923, Holdert acquired the Het Nieuws van den Dag, which had been in circulation since 1870. The latter was financially stable and had a good reputation due to its content, so Holdert was only able to get a hold of it through a sly manner, a front man called AG Ruijgrok, one of the directors of the Vereenigde Drukkerijen, who used that company to take over the Het Nieuws before immediately sold it on to Holdert. His hostile takeover of Het Nieuws caused a great deal of commotion and helped establish him as an unscrupulous businessman, a reputation that was especially promoted by his opponents. Three years later, in 1926, he built a new building for De Telegraaf on the site where Het Nieuws and the Vereenigde Drukkerijen had been located, on the Nieuwezijds Voorburgwal, which was put into use in 1930. In that same year, Holdert bought out his last remaining co-owner, J.H.H. Hülsmann, to gain full control of De Telegraaf. Even though he was a very wealthy man in 1930, he did not care for luxury since he never bought a car or a house, and never had an expensive hobby either, sept for breeding horses.

== Personal life ==
On 26 April 1895, the 25-year-old Holdert married Manon Antoinette Petronella van Duijl, with whom he had two 2 daughters, but their marriage ended after eight years, in 1903. In that same year, he began a relationship with Henriette Elisabeth Nierstrasz, whom he had met at the Telegraaf offices, and with whom he had one son, Hakkie, in 1907, and daughter Henriëtte "Tettie" in 1909. However, neither of them could bear his name because the first marriage was only dissolved on 18 April 1919, so he had them adopted by his younger brother until his marriage to Henriette in 1920.

== Later life and death ==
At the outbreak of the Second World War in 1939, Holdert, by then a long-time resident of Paris, happened to be in Amsterdam for a shareholders' meeting. Even though he the opportunity to leave, having transferred almost all of De Telegraaf's liquid assets to the US, he decided to stay, taking up residence in the Hotel American on Leidseplein. Under Holdert's strict directives, his newspapers adopted a strong anti-German stance at the start of the World War II, but during the German occupation from 1940 to 1945, he sought to prevent his newspapers from falling completely under German and NSB control by allowing the publication of German and pro-German periodicals. He also agreed to support the NSB financially, as long as Holdert's company did not fall into German hands.

After the sudden death of his wife on 1 July 1944, Holdert, who was seriously ill, followed her to the grave just three weeks later, on 21 July 1944, at the age of 74, being buried four days in the family grave at Zorgvlied. He was succeeded by his son Henri Holdert, who permitted the Germans to place reports in the newspaper, which cost De Telegraaf dearly after the War. On 7 April 1948 the tribunal assumed that Holdert "had not deliberately promoted Nazi propaganda, but that he had used improper means to save his company", so it declared 2 million guilders of Holdert's fortune, then estimated at 17.

== See also ==
- List of awards named after people
