= Nicola Hatefi =

Belgian football official and former player (born 1991)

Personal information
- Full name: Nicola Hatefi Mofrad
- Date of birth: 9 January 1991 (age 35)
- Place of birth: Uccle, Belgium
- Height: 1.83 m (6 ft 0 in)
- Position: Goalkeeper

Youth career
- 2007–2008: FC Brussels
- 2008–2009: Standard Liège
- 2009–2010: Charleroi

Senior career*
Years	Team	Apps	(Gls)
2010–2011	Charleroi	7	(0)
2011–2012	UR La Louvière Centre	2	(0)
2012	FC Ganshoren		
2012–2014	BX Brussels		
2014–2023	Royal Léopold FC		

International career
2010	Belgium U19	1	(0)
- * Club domestic league appearances and goals

Nicola Hatefi Mofrad (Persian: نیکولا هاتفی مفرد, born 9 January 1991) is a Belgian former footballer who played as a goalkeeper. He is currently the president of Belgian Provincial Leagues club Royal Léopold.

A youth graduate of FC Brussels, Standard Liège and Charleroi, he made senior appearances for Charleroi in the Belgian Pro League in 2010–11 before spells in the lower divisions with La Louvière Centre, FC Ganshoren, BX Brussels and Royal Léopold. At youth level he was capped by Belgium U19.

After retiring, Hatefi became president of his former club, Royal Léopold.

== Club career ==
Hatefi progressed through the academies of FC Brussels, Standard Liège and Charleroi. He was promoted to Charleroi's first-team squad in 2010–11 and appeared in league and cup fixtures that season; contemporary match reports from the club record him in goal against Mechelen and Gent, and in the Belgian Cup against Waasland-Beveren.

He joined third-tier UR La Louvière Centre for 2011–12, making competitive appearances in Division 3, before moving to FC Ganshoren in early 2012. A 2012 interview noted his switch to Ganshoren from Charleroi's set-up. In June 2013 he signed for BX Brussels, the phoenix club that succeeded Bleid-Molenbeek, starting regularly in the Belgian Promotion (third/fourth tier). He later spent multiple seasons with Royal Léopold FC in the provincial Brussels leagues, before retiring from playing.

== International career ==
Hatefi represented Belgium at youth level, recording four selections and one cap with the under-19s in 2010, including involvement in U18/U19 international tournaments against Montenegro and the Faroe Islands.

== Post-playing career ==
Following his retirement, Hatefi took up administrative duties at Royal Léopold FC and is listed by the club as its president and a member of the executive committee.
