= 1900 Coupe Van der Straeten Ponthoz =

Tournament details
- Country: Belgium
- Dates: 15 – 17 April
- Teams: 6

Final positions
- Champions: R.A.P. (1st title)
- Runners-up: H.V.V.

Tournament statistics
- Matches played: 5
- Goals scored: 23 (4.6 per match)
- Top goal scorer: Eetje Sol (5 goals)

The 1900 Coupe Van der Straeten Ponthoz was the 1st staging of the Coupe Van der Straeten Ponthoz, which is regarded as one of the first European trophies. The tournament was held in Brussels, between 15 and 17 April 1900.

The tournament was won by R.A.P., who played and defeated the reigning champions of Belgium (Racing Club), the Netherlands (H.V.V.) and Switzerland (Grasshopper Club) on three successive days. As these three were the only existing leagues in continental Europe at the time, the local newspapers dubbed the tournament the club championship of the continent, and thus, R.A.P. might be considered the first ever continental European Champions.

== Participants ==
Belgium, the Netherlands, Switzerland and France sent their best and most prestigious club sides to the tournament (Austria and Germany clubs had also been invited to enter but did not register).

The hosts, Belgium, sent three teams, Antwerp Daring Club (a second-level side), Royal Léopold FC and reigning national champions Racing Club de Bruxelles, which played a match against the Scottish side Alexandra Park FC in Brussels on 14 April, the day before the start of the tournament, losing 4–2. The Netherlands sent two teams, R.A.P. and the reigning Dutch champions (H.V.V.), while Switzerland and France sent one each, reigning Swiss champions Grasshopper Club and Iris Club lillois (now Lille OSC), which had won the 1899 French Championship.

Teams
(Belgium) Racing Club de Bruxelles (reigning national champions)
(Belgium) Royal Léopold FC
(Switzerland) Grasshopper Club (reigning national champions)
(Netherlands) H.V.V. (reigning national champions)
(Netherlands) R.A.P.
(France) Iris Club lillois (withdrew)
(Belgium) Antwerp Daring Club (withdrew)

== Overview ==
Because there were seven teams, two received a bye to the semi-finals while the other five had to face off for the remaining two spots in the semis. Antwerp Daring Club, who was a second-level side, withdrew after the draw as they were to play fellow Belgians Léopold in a preliminary round, with the winners meeting H.V.V. in the first round. They were not replaced, so Léopold qualified for the first round by default. The only two clubs who were not either Belgian or Dutch, Grasshopper and Iris, were the two teams who got the byes to the semi-finals, however, the latter withdrew for unclear reasons, so they had to be replaced by a "B team" of Racing (which, like the main team, could only include the maximum number of five English players).

All matches at the field of Léopold FC at Chaussée de Waterloo 513. The tournament ended up being a nightmare for the hosts, as Belgium's two main teams were knocked out in the first round by the two Dutch clubs in front of their own fans, which the local newspapers dubbed as "a national humiliation". The two Dutch clubs then beat "Racing II" and Switzerland's Grasshopper in the semi-finals, meaning that what might be the first-ever European final in history was an all-Dutch affair between H.V.V and R.A.P. The final, which was held on 16 April 1900 at The Hague, saw R.A.P. lift the trophy after upsetting the national champions with a 2–1 victory, thanks to two late goals, one from Jan van den Berg, who had netted two in the semi-finals, and the winner from Julius Hisgen.

== Bracket ==
First round
(Switzerland) Grasshopper Club
bye
15 April 1900 – The Hague
(Belgium) Racing Club de Bruxelles	1
(Netherlands) R.A.P.	2
(France) Iris Club Lille
bye
15 April 1900 – The Hague
(Belgium) Royal Léopold FC	1
(Netherlands) H.V.V.	8

Semi-finals
16 April 1900 – The Hague
(Switzerland) Grasshopper Club	2
(Netherlands) R.A.P.	3
16 April 1900 – The Hague
(Belgium) "Racing II"	0
(Netherlands) H.V.V.	3

#Final
17 April 1900 – The Hague
(Netherlands) R.A.P.	2
(Netherlands) H.V.V.	1

== Results ==
=== First round ===
Bye (2):

(Switzerland) Grasshopper Club
(France) Iris Club Lille (replaced by "Racing II")

15 April 1900

Racing Club de Bruxelles (Belgium)	1–2	(Netherlands) R.A.P.
Unknown 1–1'	Report	Van den Berg 0–1'; Kampschreur 1–2'

Léopold FC's field, The Hague
Referee: Paul de Borman (Belgium)

Note: Gorter, Van den Berg (both Haarlem) were guest players.

15 April 1900

Royal Léopold FC (Belgium)	1–8	(Netherlands) H.V.V.
van Heuckelum 1–1'	Report	F. Pĳnacker Hordĳk 0–1'; Sol 0–2', 0–3', 0–4', 0–5', 1–7'; Mundt 0–6'; Hesselink 1–8'

Léopold FC's field, The Hague

Note: Miel Mundt played for H.V.V. as a guest player.

=== Semi-finals ===
16 April 1900

Racing II (Belgium)	0–3	(Netherlands) H.V.V.
	Report	F. Pĳnacker Hordĳk 0–1', 0–2', 0–3'

Léopold FC's field, The Hague
Referee: Paul de Borman (Belgium)
16 April 1900

Grasshopper Club (Switzerland)	2–3	(Netherlands) R.A.P.
Blĳdensteĳn 1–1', 2–1'	Report	Van den Berg 0–1', 2–3'; Kampschreur 2–2'

Léopold FC's field, The Hague
Referee: A. Zellekens (Netherlands)

Note: Grasshopper reportedly included one English player (the outside left) and one Dutch player, captain Harry Blĳdensteĳn, who scored his side's two goals.

=== Final ===
17 April 1900

R.A.P. (Netherlands)	2–1	(Netherlands) H.V.V.
Van den Berg 80'; J. Hisgen 85'	Report	L. Koopman 0–1' (o.g.)

Léopold FC's field, The Hague
Referee: Paul de Borman (Belgium) (replaced the originally appointed A. Zellekens)

== Winner ==
1900 Coupe Van der Straeten Ponthoz
(Netherlands)
R.A.P.

== Statistics ==
=== Top Scorers ===
Rank	Player	Team	Goals	Stage
1	Eetje Sol	(Netherlands) H.V.V.	5	First round (5)
2	F. Pĳnacker Hordĳk	(Netherlands) H.V.V.	4	First round (3) and semi-finals (3)
2	Jan van den Berg	(Netherlands) R.A.P.	4	First round (1), semi-finals (2) and final (1)
4	Harry Blĳdensteĳn	(Switzerland) Grasshopper Club	2	Semi-finals (2)
4	Freek Kampschreur	(Netherlands) R.A.P.	2	First round (1) and semi-finals (1)

Source: RSSSF

== Aftermath ==
After the tournament, Grasshopper played three friendlies in the Netherlands, albeit without some first-choice players who had played in their semifinal clash:

18 April 1900	H.V.V. (Netherlands)	7–1	(Switzerland) Grasshopper Club	Den Haag, Netherlands
		Report

19 April 1900	Ajax Leiden (Netherlands)	1–8	(Switzerland) Grasshopper Club	Leiden, Netherlands
		Report

22 April 1900	SBV Vitesse (Netherlands)	0–6	(Switzerland) Grasshopper Club	Arnhem, Netherlands
		Report

== Legacy ==
The tournament was organized as a punctual international competition between European clubs. However, its success led to the introduction of the Coupe Vanden Abeele in Antwerp in the following year, originally intended as another international club tournament, but eventually the starting point for the Low Countries derby.

The 1900 Coupe Van der Straeten Ponthoz is generally considered informally as the first European tournament, although this title is also contested by the Challenge Cup, a competition between clubs in Austria-Hungary which started three years before, in 1897. However, this tournament up until the 1900–01 season, only featured teams from Vienna, so the 7–0 win by Vienna Cricket over Wiener FC 1898 on 21 November 1897 may not be regarded as the first ever truly international club final.

== See also ==
- 1895 World Championship
- 1897 Challenge Cup
- 1909 Sir Thomas Lipton Trophy
