= Miel Mundt =

Dutch footballer

- Mundt in 1908

Personal information
- Full name: Emil Gustav Mundt
- Date of birth: 30 May 1880
- Place of birth: Soekaboemi, Dutch East Indies
- Date of death: 17 July 1949 (aged 69)
- Place of death: Rotterdam, Netherlands
- Position: Midfielder

Senior career*
Years	Team	Apps	(Gls)
1899–1909	HVV		

International career
1908–1909	Netherlands	4	(0)
- * Club domestic league appearances and goals

Olympic medal record

Men's Football
Bronze medal – third place	1908 London	Team competition

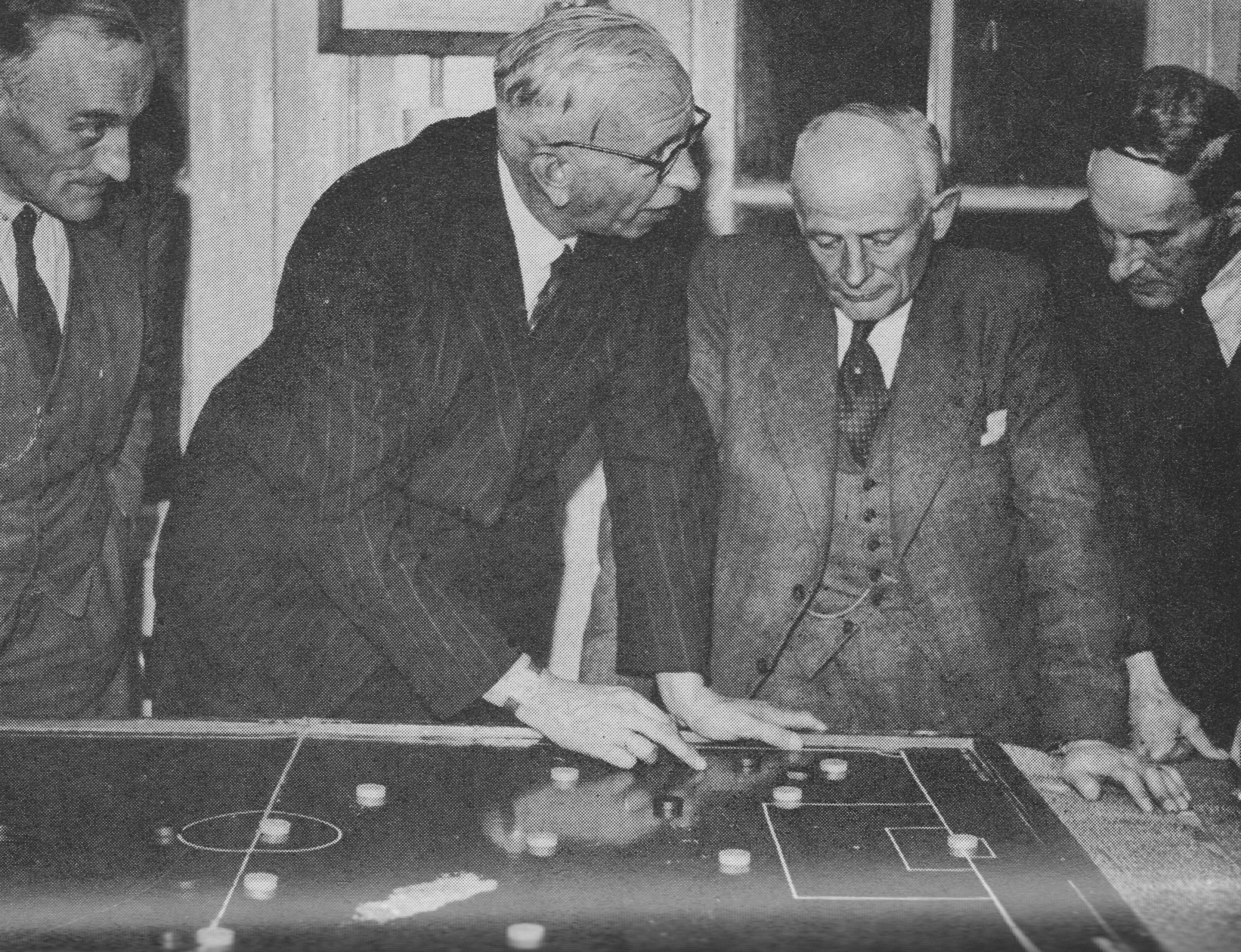
Mundt (far right) on the Dutch national team's selection committee in 1930

Emil "Miel" Gustav Mundt (30 May 1880 in Soekaboemi, Dutch East Indies – 17 July 1949 in Rotterdam) was a Dutch football player who competed in the 1908 Summer Olympics. In the Netherlands, he played for H.V.V. (Hague Football Club).

== Biography ==
He spent his entire playing career at H.V.V., winning the Dutch championship several times. In 1900, Mundt was a member of the H.V.V. side that participated in the first edition of the Coupe Van der Straeten Ponthoz in 1900, regarded by many as the first-ever European club trophy. In the tournament, he scored one goal in the first round in an 8–1 trashing of hosts Léopold FC.

He was the captain of the Dutch team at the 1908 Summer Olympics, helping his nation win the bronze medal in the football tournament. He only featured in one match, the 0–4 defeat at the hands of Great Britain. In total, he earned four caps for the Netherlands (two wins and two losses), all of which as captain.

== Honours ==
=== Club ===
HVV

- Dutch championship:
  - Champions (6): 1899–1900, 1900–01, 1901–02, 1902–03, 1904–05 and 1906–07
- KNVB Cup:
  - Champions (1): 1903
- Coupe Van der Straeten Ponthoz:
  - Runner-up (1): 1900

=== International ===
Netherlands

- Olympic Games Bronze medal: 1908

== See also ==
- List of Netherlands international footballers born outside the Netherlands
