= 1898–99 KNVB Cup =

Tournament details
- Country: The Netherlands
- Dates: 27 November 1898 – 7 May 1899
- Teams: 18

Final positions
- Champions: RAP Amsterdam (1st title)
- Runner-up: HVV Den Haag

Tournament statistics
- Matches played: 12
- Goals scored: 57 (4.75 per match)

The 1898–99 KNVB Cup was the 1st staging of the KNVB Cup. The final was originally planned to be played in Utrecht on the Hercules ground, but it was later moved to Heemstede and played there on 7 May 1899.

The cup winner was RAP Amsterdam, beating HVV Den Haag in the final. RAP not only became cup winners this season, but also national champions, making them the first Dutch double winner.

== Format ==
All ties were played in one game, and if the result was a draw, two extra periods of 7½ minutes were played to determine the winner. If there was no winner after that, another extra period of two extra periods of 7½ minutes was played, and if there was still no decision after that, the game was replayed on the opponent's pitch. If the third game also ended in a draw, the game went into extra time until a goal was scored.

== Results ==
=== First round ===
==== District 1 ====
Team 1	Score	Team 2
Ajax Sportman Combinatie	5–0	HFC Haarlem
Swift Amsterdam	0–5	RAP Amsterdam
Volharding Amsterdam	3–1	Quick Amsterdam

(Note: Not played, HFC Haarlem did not compete)

==== District 2 ====
Team 1	Score	Team 2
BVV Breda	5–0	Victoria Rotterdam
Celeritas Rotterdam	5–0	DSV Concordia Delft
HVV Den Haag	5–1	Rapiditas Rotterdam

(Note: Not played, Victoria Rotterdam did not compete) (Note: Not played, DSV Concordia Delft did not compete)

==== District 3 ====
Team 1	Score	Team 2
Be Quick 1887	0–7	Victoria Wageningen
EFC Prises Wilhelmina	5–0	Go Ahead Wageningen
UC & VV Hercules	3–0	Vitesse Arnheim

(Note: Not played, Go Ahead did not compete)

=== Second round ===
Team 1	Score	Team 2
RAP Amsterdam	4–1	Ajax Sportman Combinatie
Celeritas Rotterdam	1–6	HVV Den Haag
EFC Prises Wilhelmina	5–0	Victoria Wageningen
Volharding Amsterdam	Bye	
BVV Breda	Bye	
UC & VV Hercules	Bye	

(Note: Not played, Victoria Wageningen did not compete)

=== Quarterfinals ===
Team 1	Score	Team 2
EFC Prises Wilhelmina	3–1	UC & VV Hercules
BVV Breda	1–7	RAP Amsterdam
HVV Den Haag	Bye	
Volharding Amsterdam	Bye	

=== Semi-finals ===
Team 1	Score	Team 2
RAP Amsterdam	3–1	UC & VV Hercules
HVV Den Haag	2–1	Volharding Amsterdam

(Note: Replay, the game on 19 March 1899 was canceled at 1–1 in the 70th minute due to snow and hail.)

=== Final ===
7 May 1899
Final

RAP Amsterdam	1 – 0 (a.e.t.)	HVV Den Haag
Hisgen 116'	Report1; Report2

Koekamp, Heemstede, Netherlands
Referee: Bill Dijxhoorn
