= Eetje Sol =

Dutch footballer

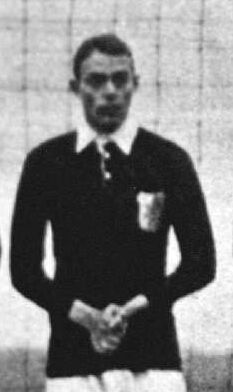

Personal information
- Full name: Johan Wilhelm Eduard Sol
- Date of birth: 10 June 1881
- Place of birth: Tjiomas, Dutch East Indies
- Date of death: 21 August 1965 (aged 84)
- Place of death: The Hague, Netherlands
- Position: Forward

Senior career*
Years	Team	Apps	(Gls)
1898-1909	HVV	133	(122)
Total		133	(122)

International career
1908–1909	Netherlands	3	(0)
- * Club domestic league appearances and goals

Olympic medal record

Men's Football
Bronze medal – third place	1908 London	Team competition

Johan Wilhelm Eduard "Eetje" Sol (10 June 1881 – 21 October 1965) was a Dutch footballer who played as a forward for HVV Den Haag. He was a member of the Dutch team that won the bronze medal at the 1908 Summer Olympics.

== Club career ==
Sol spent his entire playing career at HVV, thus being part of the so-called one-club men group. In total, he scored 122 goals in 133 matches for the club, with his goalscoring performances proving crucial in helping the club win the Dutch championship five times in the 1900s, including four successive championships between 1900 and 1903. He also won the KNVB Cup in 1903, netting once in a 6–1 win over HBS Craeyenhout in the final, to help his side win the only Cup title in the club's history.

In 1900, Eetje Sol was a member of the HVV side that participated in the first edition of the Coupe Van der Straeten Ponthoz in 1900, regarded by many as the first-ever European club trophy. In the tournament, he scored five goals in the first round in an 8–1 trashing of hosts Léopold FC, and despite not scoring again in the semi-finals or in the final, which ended in a 1–2 loss to fellow Dutch club RAP, his 5-goal haul was enough for him to be crowned as the top scorer of the tournament.

== International career ==
He represented the Dutch team at the 1908 Summer Olympics, helping his nation win the bronze medal in the football tournament. He played both matches as a midfielder, including the 2-0 win over Sweden in the bronze medal match.

== Honours ==
HVV

- Dutch championship: 1899–1900, 1900–01, 1901–02, 1902–03, 1904–05 and 1906–07
- KNVB Cup: 1903
- Coupe Van der Straeten Ponthoz runner-up: 1900

Netherlands

- Olympic Games Bronze medal: 1908

== See also ==
List of Netherlands international footballers born outside the Netherlands
