= Hendrik van Heuckelum =

Dutch footballer (1879–1929)

Henk van Heuckelum
Personal information
- Full name: Hendrik van Heuckelum
- Date of birth: 6 May 1879
- Place of birth: The Hague, Netherlands
- Date of death: 28 April 1929 (aged 49)
- Place of death: The Hague, Netherlands
- Position: Forward

Senior career*
Years	Team	Apps	(Gls)
- HBS Craeyenhout
1900	Léopold		

International career
1900	Belgium Olympic	1	(13)
Medal record
Men's football
Representing Belgium
Bronze medal – third place	1900 Paris	Team competition
- * Club domestic league appearances and goals

Hendrik van Heuckelum (6 May 1879, The Hague – 28 April 1929, The Hague), shortened Henk, was a Dutch footballer who played as a forward for HBS-Craeyenhout and Royal Léopold Club, and who represented Belgium at the 1900 Summer Olympics, winning the bronze medal in the football tournament.

== Biography ==
Van Heuckelum was born in The Hague in May 1897 to Hendrik van Heuckelum and Adèle Goldman. In his club career he played for both HBS Craeyenhout in the Netherlands, and Royal Léopold Club in Belgium, finishing runner-up of the 1901-1902 Belgian championship with the letter after losing a tie-breaker to Racing Club de Bruxelles 3-4.

In 1900 he was a member of the Belgian team, which won the bronze medal in the football tournament. In those times it was common to play for another country. He played one match as a forward in which he scored one goal in a 2–6 loss to France, represented by Club Français.

Also in 1900, in addition to having the honor to participate in an Olympic Football event, van Heuckelum also had the honor to participate in the first-ever European club tournament, the 1900 Coupe Van der Straeten Ponthoz, as a Léopold player. However, the glory soon become an humiliation, as they were knocked out in the first round by the then Dutch champions HVV with a resounding 8-1 loss, being van Heuckelum who scored Léopold's consolation goal.

Van Heuckelum married Catharine Marie Louise Paats in 1907.

== Honours ==
=== Club ===
Royal Léopold Club

- Belgian championship:
  - Runner-up (1): 1901–02

=== International ===
Belgium

- Olympic Games Bronze medal: 1900
