= 1898–99 Netherlands Football League Championship =

Netherl. Football Championship
- Season: 1898–99
- Champions: RAP (5th title)

The Netherlands Football League Championship 1898–1899 was contested by twelve teams participating in two divisions. The national champion would be determined by a play-off match featuring the winners of the eastern and western football division of the Netherlands. RAP won this year's championship by beating PW Enschede 3-2 and 2–1.

== New entrants ==
Eerste Klasse East:

- U.D.
- Quick Nijmegen

Eerste Klasse West:

- Koninklijke HFC returned after one season of absence

== Divisions ==
=== Eerste Klasse East ===
Pos	Team	Pld	W	D	L	GF	GA	GD	Pts	Qualification
1	PW	8	7	0	1	19	10	+9	14	Qualified for Championship play-off
2	Go Ahead Wageningen	8	4	2	2	22	13	+9	10	
3	Vitesse	8	3	2	3	16	16	0	8	
4	Quick Nijmegen	8	2	0	6	13	18	−5	4	
5	U.D.	8	2	0	6	10	23	−13	4	Not participating next season

Source: rsssf.com

=== Eerste Klasse West ===
Pos	Team	Pld	W	D	L	GF	GA	GD	Pts	Qualification
1	RAP	12	10	2	0	37	15	+22	22	Qualified for Championship play-off
2	HVV Den Haag	12	6	2	4	23	15	+8	14	
3	HFC Haarlem	12	5	3	4	29	23	+6	13	
4	HBS Craeyenhout	12	5	2	5	21	15	+6	12	
5	Sparta Rotterdam	12	5	0	7	18	28	−10	10	
6	Koninklijke HFC	12	3	1	8	13	33	−20	7	
7	Rapiditas Rotterdam	12	3	0	9	17	29	−12	6	Not participating next season

Source: rsssf.com

=== Championship play-off ===
Team 1	Agg.	Team 2	1st leg	2nd leg
RAP	5–3	PW Enschede	3–2	2–1

RAP won the championship.
