= 1897–98 Netherlands Football League Championship =

Netherl. Football Championship
- Season: 1897–98
- Champions: RAP (4th title)

The Netherlands Football League Championship 1897–1898 was contested by ten teams participating in two divisions. The national champion would be determined by a play-off match featuring the winners of the eastern and western football division of the Netherlands. RAP won this year's championship by beating Vitesse Arnhem 4–2.

== New entrants ==
Eerste Klasse East: (new division)

- Go Ahead Wageningen, returning after one year of absence (previously participating in the western division)
- PW
- Vitesse

Eerste Klasse West:

- Celeritas
- HFC Haarlem

== Divisions ==
=== Eerste Klasse East ===
Pos	Team	Pld	W	D	L	GF	GA	GD	Pts	Qualification
1	Vitesse	4	3	1	0	12	5	+7	7	Qualified for Championship Final
2	Go Ahead Wageningen	4	1	2	1	9	8	+1	4	
3	PW	4	0	1	3	6	14	−8	1	

Source: rsssf.com

=== Eerste Klasse West ===
Pos	Team	Pld	W	D	L	GF	GA	GD	Pts	Qualification
1	RAP	12	9	2	1	39	8	+31	20	Qualified for Championship Final
2	Sparta Rotterdam	12	6	4	2	22	13	+9	16	
3	HBS Craeyenhout	12	6	1	5	24	19	+5	13	
4	HFC Haarlem	12	4	3	5	23	23	0	11	
5	Rapiditas Rotterdam	12	4	2	6	21	31	−10	10	
6	HVV Den Haag	12	4	2	6	16	28	−12	10	
7	Celeritas	12	0	4	8	7	30	−23	4	Not participating next season

Source: rsssf.com

== Championship play-off ==
Team 1	Score	Team 2
RAP	4–2	Vitesse

RAP won the championship.
