= Coupe Van der Straeten Ponthoz =

European football tournament

- Founded: 1900
- Abolished: 1907; 119 years ago
- Region: Europe
- Teams: 6 to 13
- Last champions: (Belgium) Union Saint-Gilloise (1907)
- Most championships: (Belgium) Union Saint-Gilloise (3 titles)

The Coupe Van der Straeten Ponthoz, also known as Coupe Ponthoz, was an international competition for football clubs from Europe that ran from 1900 to 1907. It was one of the first European club football tournaments and is considered a predecessor of club tournaments in Europe, namely the European Cup. It was named in honor of the donator of the trophy Carl van der Straten-Ponthoz

== History ==
It was invented in 1900 at the instigation of Count van der Straten-Ponthoz, who offered the cup to the winners of an international tournament held in Brussels featuring six teams, including the champions of Belgium (Racing Club), the Netherlands (H.V.V.) and Switzerland (Grasshopper Club). As these were the only existing leagues in continental Europe, the local newspapers at that time dubbed the tournament the club championship of the continent. Thus, the winners of the first edition, R.A.P. from the Netherlands, might be considered the first ever continental European Champions, although this title is also contested by Vienna Cricket and Football-Club, who were the winners of the first Challenge Cup in 1897, a competition between clubs in Austria-Hungary. However, this tournament up until the 1900–01 season, only featured teams from Vienna, so the 7–0 win by Cricket over Wiener FC 1898 on 21 November 1897 may not be regarded as the first ever truly international club final, and neither Cricket, the first ever international club champions.

This cup tournament was held annually in Belgium from 1900 to 1907, but in 1908 this competition was replaced by the Coupe Jean Dupuich, which ran until the mid-20s. Besides Belgium, the Netherlands and Switzerland, clubs from England and France also participated in the competition. Just as the Challenge Cup is seen as the predecessor to the Mitropa Cup, established in 1927, the Coupe Van der Straeten Ponthoz is seen as the predecessor to the European Cup, established in 1955.

== 1900 Coupe Van der Straeten Ponthoz ==
All matches of the first edition were held at Léopold FC's ground in Brussels, and the first round saw both Belgian clubs being defeated in front of their own people, and to add salt to injury, they both lost to Dutch clubs, which then reached the final held on 16 April 1900. In the final, the reigning Dutch champions H.V.V. lost to R.A.P. (1–2), who had also beaten the champions of Belgium and Switzerland on their way to lifting the trophy, which means that R.A.P. played and defeated the three reigning champions of the only existing leagues in continental Europe at the time. HVV led for most of the match, but two late goals from RAP's Jan van den Berg and Julius Hisgen made up for an epic turnaround.

== 1901 Coupe Van der Straeten Ponthoz ==
The second edition brought together only Belgian and Dutch clubs, and the title holders R.A.P. started off the tournament as they had left it: By surprising everyone, this time with an 11–2 trashing of Athletic & Running Club, but they were then knocked out in the quarter-finals by the eventual champions H.B.S., who won the tournament with only two goals scored and none conceded, beating Racing Club de Bruxelles 1–0 in the final. This tournament was also wrapped up in controversy. The semi-final between H.V.V. and Racing Club was stopped after the former withdrew with the score at 2-2, claiming that they were discontent with the refereeing who was allowing too much foul play. The controversy raised the question of whether should be an “independent body for the management of football competitions”. The exchange of ideas and letters that followed were important elements in the foundation of FIFA in 1904.

=== Results ===
First round
6 April 1901 – The Hague
(Belgium) Racing Club de Bruxelles	6
(Netherlands) D.F.C.	1
6 April 1901 – The Hague
(Belgium) Beerschot	forfeited
(Netherlands) Celeritas
(Belgium) Royal Léopold FC
bye
(Netherlands) H.V.V.
bye
(Belgium) Sporting Club de Bruxelles
bye
(Netherlands) Rapiditas Rotterdam
bye
6 April 1901 – The Hague
(Belgium) Athletic & Running Club	2
(Netherlands) R.A.P.	11
(Netherlands) H.B.S.
bye

Quarter-finals
7 April 1901 – The Hague
(Belgium) Racing Club de Bruxelles	3
(Netherlands) Celeritas	1
7 April 1901 – The Hague
(Belgium) Royal Léopold FC	3
(Netherlands) H.V.V.	6
7 April 1901 – The Hague
(Belgium) Sporting Club de Bruxelles	forfeited
(Netherlands) Rapiditas Rotterdam
7 April 1901 – The Hague
(Netherlands) R.A.P.	0
(Netherlands) H.B.S.	1

Semi-finals
8 April 1901 – The Hague
(Belgium) Racing Club de Bruxelles (Awarded)	2
(Netherlands) H.V.V.	1
8 April 1901 – The Hague
(Netherlands) Rapiditas Rotterdam	forfeited
(Netherlands) H.B.S.

Final
9 April 1901 – The Hague
(Belgium) Racing Club de Bruxelles	0
(Netherlands) H.B.S.	1

== 1902 Coupe Van der Straeten Ponthoz ==
In 1902, the competition was expanded and saw the inclusion of a French and an English club for the first time, France sent Racing Club de Roubaix, the 1902 Champions of France, although they forfeited in the first round, and England sent Pilgrims F.C., which was a combination of Belgian (such as the goalkeeper Grisar) and English players (from various English cities, and some of them active in Belgium, such as Herbert Potts of Beerschot) formed on the occasion of this tournament. The Belgian clubs were left humiliated once again, going out of the tournament with 2–8, 1–4 and 4–0 defeats. Pilgrims FC took the trophy to London after beating D.F.C. 4–2 in the final.

=== Results ===
Quarter-finals
30 March 1902 – The Hague
(Belgium) Union Saint-Gilloise	2
(Netherlands) D.F.C.	8
30 March 1902 – The Hague
(Belgium) Daring Club de Bruxelles	1
(Netherlands) H.B.S.	4
30 March 1902 – The Hague
(Belgium) Royal Léopold FC
(France) Racing Club de Roubaix	forfeited
30 March 1902 – The Hague
(England) Pilgrims F.C.
(Netherlands) Voorwaarts	forfeited

Semi-finals
31 March 1902 – The Hague
(Netherlands) D.F.C.	2
(Netherlands) H.B.S.	1
31 March 1902 – The Hague
(Belgium) Royal Léopold FC	0
(England) Pilgrims F.C.	4

Final
1 April 1902 – The Hague
(England) Pilgrims F.C.	4
(Netherlands) D.F.C.	2

== 1903 Coupe Van der Straeten Ponthoz ==
The holders Pilgrims F.C. reprised their participation in order to defend the title, and just like in the previous year, they consisted of a combination of Belgian (such as their right back Friling) and English players from various English cities, and some of them active in Belgium (such as Herbert Potts of Beerschot). In addition to Pilgrims, a second English team participated, Maidstone (Maidstone Church Institute Wanderers FC), which was narrowly defeated in the first round by the eventual champions Racing Club de Bruxelles, marking the first time a Belgian club lifted the trophy, doing so after getting the better of Pilgrims in the final in a thrilling 6–5 win after extra-time. Notably, Pilgrims never scored less than 5 goals per match, trashing the likes of Daring Club de Bruxelles (6–0), Olympia Club de Bruxelles (8–1), and Union Saint-Gilloise (6–1) on their road to the final, and then scoring 5 goals in the final itself as well, but somehow that was still not enough to lift the trophy for a consecutive time. Another notable result was a 10-goal thriller between Royal Léopold FC and D.F.C., ending in a 7–3 to the latter.

This was Maidstone's fourth tour in the Low Countries after having previously faced an Holland XI side in 1894 and 1895 in Heemstede, and FC Brugge in 1901. After being knocked out from the Coupe, they played a friendly match against Léopold, who had also been eliminated in the first round, winning comfortably by 4–0. They played and won a further two friendlies against SC Courtraisien and FC Brugge before returning to England. On 13 April, after the semi-finals, Léopold and D.F.C. faced each other in a friendly in honor of Prince Albert of Belgium, ending in a 3–1 win for Léopold.

=== Results ===
First round
(Belgium) Athletic & Running Club
bye
11 April 1903 – The Hague
(Belgium) Beerschot
(Netherlands) Velocitas	forfeited
11 April 1903 – The Hague
(Belgium) Racing Club de Bruxelles	1
(England) Maidstone	0
11 April 1903 – The Hague
(Belgium) Royal Léopold FC	3
(Netherlands) D.F.C.	7
11 April 1903 – The Hague
(Belgium) Daring Club de Bruxelles	0
(England) Pilgrims F.C.	6
11 April 1903 – The Hague
(Belgium) Olympia Club de Bruxelles	1
(Netherlands) Celeritas	0
(Belgium) Union Saint-Gilloise
bye
(Netherlands) H.B.S.
bye

Quarter-finals
12 April 1903 – The Hague
(Belgium) Athletic & Running Club	5
(Belgium) Beerschot	2
12 April 1903 – The Hague
(Belgium) Racing Club de Bruxelles	3
(Netherlands) D.F.C.	1
12 April 1903 – The Hague
(Belgium) Olympia Club de Bruxelles	1
(England) Pilgrims F.C.	8
12 April 1903 – The Hague
(Belgium) Union Saint-Gilloise
(Netherlands) H.B.S.	forfeited

Semi-finals
13 April 1903 – The Hague
(Belgium) Racing Club de Bruxelles
(Belgium) Athletic & Running Club	forfeited
13 April 1903 – The Hague
(Belgium) Union Saint-Gilloise	1
(England) Pilgrims F.C.	6

Final
14 April 1903 – The Hague
(Belgium) Racing Club de Bruxelles	6
(England) Pilgrims F.C.	5

== 1904 Coupe Van der Straeten Ponthoz ==
The fifth edition of this cup saw Racing Club de Bruxelles become the first club in the competition's history to retain the title after beating fellow Belgians Union Saint-Gilloise 3–2 in the final. The title-holders Pilgrims F.C., was part of the original draw, but in the end their place was taken by Beerschot. All the matches were held at Antwerp (Beerschot's ground) and Brussels (Léopold and Racing's ground such as Vivier d'Oie and Uccle).

=== Results ===
First round
(Belgium) Racing Club de Bruxelles
bye
(France) Montrouge
bye
(Belgium) Daring Club de Bruxelles
bye
(Netherlands) Celeritas
bye
2 April 1904 – Beerschot
(Belgium) Union Saint-Gilloise	2
(Belgium) FC Liégeois	1
2 April 1904 – Racing
(Belgium) Royal Léopold FC	forfeited
(Netherlands) H.B.S.
2 April 1904 – Racing Club de Bruxelles
(Belgium) Athletic & Running Club
(Netherlands) D.F.C.	forfeited
2 April 1904 – Beerschot
(Belgium) Beerschot
(Netherlands) H.V.V.	forfeited

Quarter-finals
3 April 1904 – Beerschot
(Belgium) Racing Club de Bruxelles
(France) Montrouge	forfeited
3 April 1904 – Beerschot
(Belgium) Daring Club de Bruxelles	5
(Netherlands) Celeritas	2
3 April 1904 – Léopold
(Belgium) Union Saint-Gilloise	2
(Netherlands) H.B.S.	1
3 April 1904 – Léopold
(Belgium) Athletic & Running Club	2
(Belgium) Beerschot	4

Semi-finals
4 April 1904 – Racing
(Belgium) Racing Club de Bruxelles	5
(Belgium) Daring Club de Bruxelles	0
4 April 1904 – Racing
(Belgium) Union Saint-Gilloise
(Belgium) Beerschot	forfeited

Final
5 April 1904 – Léopold
(Belgium) Racing Club de Bruxelles	3
(Belgium) Union Saint-Gilloise	2

== 1905 Coupe Van der Straeten Ponthoz ==
The sixth edition of the competition was contested by four Belgian clubs, two Dutch clubs, and two English clubs, the latter's two representants being both debutants, East Sheen F.C. and Notts Magdala F.C., and they were both eliminated in the first round. Both semi-finals were a Belgian-Dutch affair, and both ended with a Belgian victory, thus setting an all-Belgian final for the second consecutive season, and again between Union Saint-Gilloise and Racing Club de Bruxelles. The latter had won the previous final 3–2, but this time it was Union who got the better of their rivals with a comfortable 5–1 victory, thus winning the Coupe Van der Straeten Ponthoz for the first time.

=== Results ===
Quarter-finals
23 April 1905 – The Hague
(Belgium) Union Saint-Gilloise	3
(England) East Sheen F.C.	1
23 April 1905 – The Hague
(Belgium) Royal Léopold FC	2
(Netherlands) H.F.C.	6
23 April 1905 – The Hague
(Belgium) Racing Club de Bruxelles	3
(England) Notts Magdala F.C.	0
23 April 1905 – The Hague
(Belgium) Daring Club de Bruxelles	1
(Netherlands) D.F.C	4

Semi-finals
24 April 1905 – The Hague
(Belgium) Union Saint-Gilloise	2
(Netherlands) H.F.C.	1
24 April 1905 – The Hague
(Belgium) Racing Club de Bruxelles	3
(Netherlands) D.F.C	1

Final
25 April 1905 – The Hague
(Belgium) Union Saint-Gilloise	5
(Belgium) Racing Club de Bruxelles	1

== 1906 Coupe Van der Straeten Ponthoz ==
The seventh edition of the competition saw Union Saint-Gilloise and Racing Club de Bruxelles proving to be the strongest teams in the Low Countries by reaching the final of the tournament for a third consecutive season. Union was at the peak of its golden age which won six out of seven national championships between 1904 and 1910, but Racing strongly contested their bid for supremacy and managed to hold them to a 1–1 draw, which forced extra-time where again both teams scored to level the scores at 2. Rather than simply replaying the match, the organization was left clueless on how to handle the situation and after contacting the secretary of the English FA, it was decided to proclaim both teams as "joint holders", meaning a third title to Racing and a second consecutive to Union.

=== Results ===
Quarter-finals
(Belgium) Union Saint-Gilloise
bye
15 April 1906 – The Hague
(Belgium) Daring Club de Bruxelles	1
(Netherlands) H.F.C.	0
15 April 1906 – The Hague
(Belgium) Racing Club de Bruxelles	2
(England) Emerity FC	0
(Belgium) Royal Léopold FC
bye

Semi-finals
16 April 1906 – The Hague
(Belgium) Union Saint-Gilloise	4
(Belgium) Daring Club de Bruxelles	2
16 April 1906 – The Hague
(Belgium) Racing Club de Bruxelles	4
(Belgium) Royal Léopold FC	1

Final
17 April 1906 – The Hague
(Belgium) Union Saint-Gilloise	2
(Belgium) Racing Club de Bruxelles	2

== 1907 Coupe Van der Straeten Ponthoz ==
The eighth and last edition of the competition was by far the most international one since it had clubs from 5 different countries: Belgium, the Netherlands, France, England, and the debutants Germany, whose representative was Dortmund FC. France sent Racing Club de Roubaix (they had participated in the 1902 edition), the 1906 Champions of France, and this time the French did not forfeit, but nevertheless, they still went out in the first round after a 3–5 loss to Hampstead F.C., who was participating in the competition for the first time. In the semi-finals, Hampstead knocked out the three-time winners Racing Club de Bruxelles (3–1) and then met the two-time winners Union Saint-Gilloise in the final, who at the time had quite possibly one of the best teams in whole Europe, having just won the Belgian championship for the fourth consecutive season. Saint-Gilloise had trashed Dortmund FC with a resounding 12–0 win in the first round and then comfortably got past the semi-finals with a 4–0 win. However, despite the clear superiority of the Belgs, Hampstead was able to compete head-to-head with them, and in the end, they lost by a goal (0–1). Union Saint-Gilloise thus lifted the trophy for a third consecutive season meant invoking the right to keep the cup rule, Saint-Gilloise became the definitive holders of the Coupe Van der Straeten Ponthoz trophy.

=== Results ===
Quarter-finals
31 March 1907 – The Hague
(Belgium) Union Saint-Gilloise	12
(German Empire) Dortmund FC	0
31 March 1907 – The Hague
(Belgium) Royal Léopold FC	0
(Netherlands) Sparta Rotterdam	2
31 March 1907 – The Hague
(England) Hampstead F.C.	5
(France) Racing Club de Roubaix	3
31 March 1907 – The Hague
(Belgium) Racing Club de Bruxelles	2
(England) Emerity FC	0

Semi-finals
1 April 1907 – The Hague
(Belgium) Union Saint-Gilloise	4
(Netherlands) Sparta Rotterdam	0
1 April 1907 – The Hague
(Belgium) Racing Club de Bruxelles	1
(England) Hampstead F.C.	3

Final
2 April 1907 – The Hague
(Belgium) Union Saint-Gilloise	1
(England) Hampstead F.C.	0

== Champions ==
=== List of finals ===
Year	Champion	Result	Runner-up	Top scorers
1900	(Netherlands) R.A.P.	2–1	(Netherlands) H.V.V.	Johan Sol (5 goals)
1901	(Netherlands) HBS	1–0	(Belgium) Racing Club	Unknown
1902	(England) Pilgrims F.C.	4–2	(Netherlands) DFC	Unknown
1903	(Belgium) Racing Club	6–5 (A.E.T)	(England) Pilgrims F.C.	Unknown
1904	(Belgium) Racing Club	3–2	(Belgium) Union Saint-Gilloise	Unknown
1905	(Belgium) Union Saint-Gilloise	5–1	(Belgium) Racing Club	Unknown
1906	(Belgium) Union Saint-Gilloise & (Belgium) Racing Club	2–2 (A.E.T)	No Runner-up / Title shared	Unknown
1907	(Belgium) Union Saint-Gilloise	1–0	(England) Hampstead F.C.	Unknown

=== Titles by club ===
Club	Titles	Year
(Belgium) Union Saint-Gilloise	3	1905, 1906, 1907
(Belgium) Racing Club de Bruxelles	3	1903, 1904, 1906
(Netherlands) R.A.P.	1	1900
(Netherlands) HBS	1	1901
(England) Pilgrims F.C.	1	1902

=== Titles by country ===
Country	Winners	Runner-ups
Belgium	6	3
Netherlands	2	2
England	1	2

== Legacy ==
The success of the first edition led to the introduction of the Coupe Vanden Abeele in Antwerp in the following year, originally intended as an international club tournament as well, but eventually the starting point for the Low Countries derby. After winning the Coupe Van der Straeten Ponthoz for a third consecutive season, Union Saint-Gilloise became the definitive holders of the cup. A new trophy was created, the Coupe Jean Dupuich. The new cup was offered by Adolphe Dupuich and named in memory of his deceased son Jean, a forward at Léopold CB, after his name.

== See also ==
- Challenge Cup
- Challenge International du Nord
- Coupe Jean Dupuich
- Mitropa Cup
- European Cup
