= Royal Léopold Football Club =

Belgian association football club in Brussels

Royal Léopold
- Full name: Royal Léopold Football Club
- Nickname: Le Léo (The Léo)
- Founded: 11 February 1893; 133 years ago
- Ground: Stade Neerstalle, Uccle, Brussels
- Capacity: 1,500
- Chairman: Nicola Hatefi
- Manager: Dimitri Leurquin
- League: Belgian First Provincial
- Website: leopoldfc.com
| Home colours | Away colours |

Royal Léopold Football Club is a Belgian football club based in Uccle, Brussels. It was founded in 1893 (133 years ago) as Léopold Football Club and over the years, numerous name changes in its history and mergers have happened with neighbouring clubs who also struggled to keep the club alive. The club once played in the highest division, but later dropped to the provincial series, and now it currently plays in the Belgian Promotion D, the fourth level in Belgian football.

== History ==
=== Early history ===
The club was founded on 11 February 1893 by Baron Albert de Bassompierre (1873–1956), making it the oldest active football club in Brussels. The club was named Léopold Football Club in tribute to the king. It was created as a club for the bourgeoisie and nobility in Brussels. On 1 September 1895, Léopold Club was one of the founding members of the UBSSA, the forerunner of the RBFA. The team played in red and white.

The team entered the first-ever official Belgian championship in 1895–96, and remained in the highest division until 1912, when the team finished last and was therefore relegated. So they played the 1912–13 in the second division but managed to finish second, thus rejoining the highest division in 1913–14. However, the team again finished last again in the last season before World War I and never managed to come back to the top level.

During this time they also participated in the Challenge International du Nord, winning the inaugural edition in 1898 and again in 1899, and then reached the final a further one time in 1901.

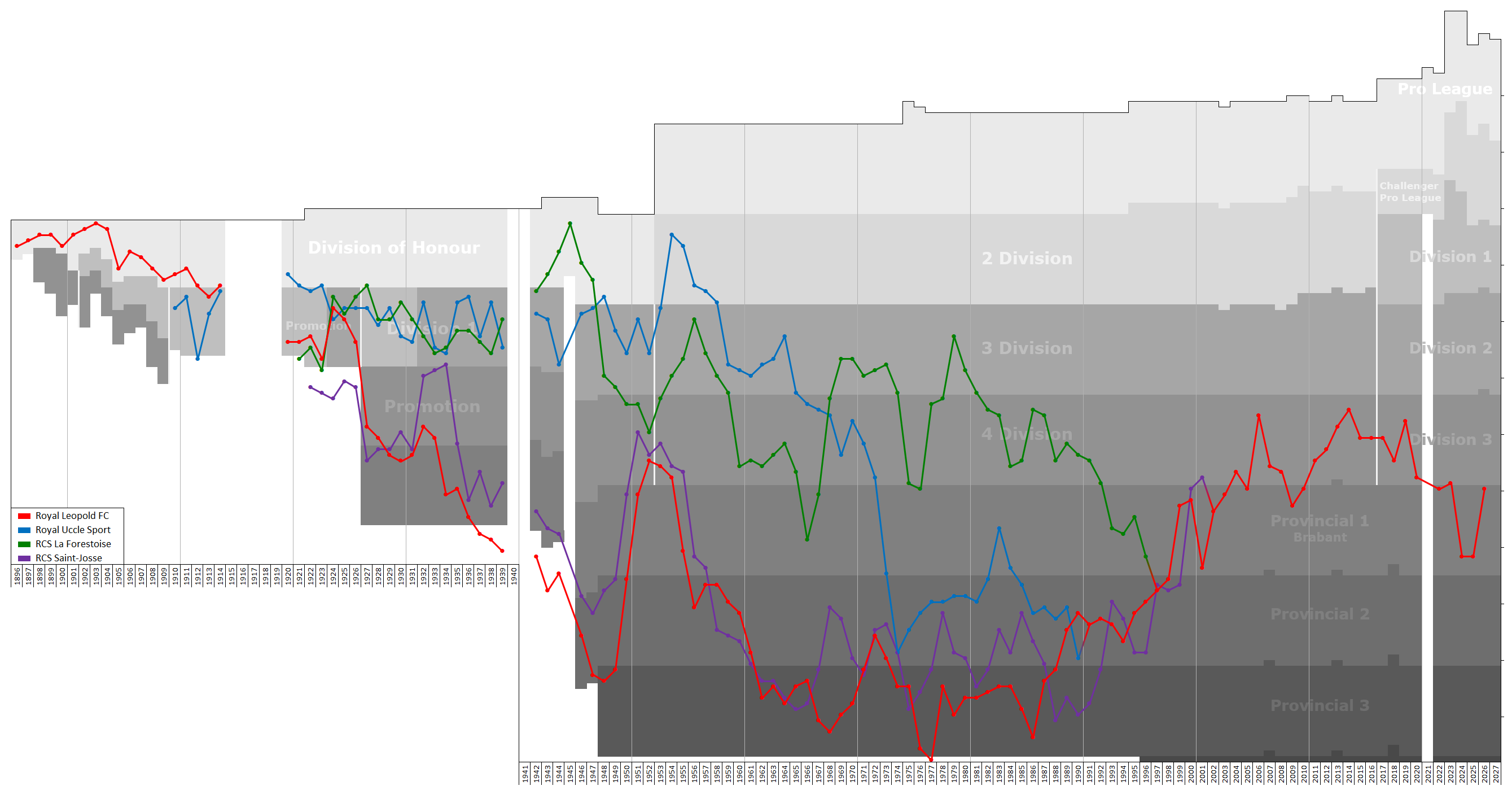
Historical league performance chart of Royal Leopold FC and its predecessors

In 1900, the club participated in the first edition of the Coupe Van der Straeten Ponthoz in 1900, regarded by many as the first-ever European club trophy. The tournament was held in Brussels and all matches took place at Léopold FC's home ground, but despite being the hosts, they were knocked-out in the first round by the reigning Dutch champions HVV Den Haag by a resounding 8–1 loss, with a consolation goal from Hendrik van Heuckelum.

=== Recent history ===
The club faced many name changes in its history, the last of them following a string of merges to keep the matricule n°5 alive (such as with R.C.S. La Forestoise in 1996 for example); it changed its name to the present one in July 2014.

== Honours ==
- Belgian First Division
  - Runner-up (1): 1901–02
- Challenge International du Nord
  - Champions (2): 1898 and 1899
  - Runner-up (1): 1901
