= AVV RAP =

- Full name: Amsterdamsche Voetbalvereeniging RUN, Amstels, Progress
- Nickname: RAP
- Founded: 1887
- Dissolved: 1914
Home colours

AVV RAP, in the long form Amsterdamsche Voetbalvereeniging RUN, Amstels, Progress, was a Dutch football club based in Amsterdam, playing in the Netherlands Football League Championship. The club existed from 1887 to 1914 and was the first cup champion of the Netherlands in the 1898–99 season. The club is most famous for being the winners of the first edition of the Coupe Van der Straeten Ponthoz in 1900, one of the world's first international footballing competitions, in which it played and defeated the reigning champions of Belgium, Switzerland and the Netherlands on three successive days.

== History ==
=== 19th century ===
It was founded in Amsterdam on 14 November 1887, by members of three cricket clubs, RUN, Amstels and Progress: RAP. The team managed to win the Netherlands Football League Championship five times (all of which in the 19th century), including three titles in a row between 1897 and 1899, going undefeated in the latter season (1898–99). The dominance of RAP in that season was demonstrated by the fact that HVV Den Haag, who finished second that year, was eight points behind RAP in the end. In that same season, RAP won the very first edition of the KNVB Cup, beating HVV Den Haag 1–0 in the final thanks to a goal from Jan Hisgen, and thus RAP was the first team in the Netherlands to win the league title and the Cup in the same season.

=== 1900 Coupe Van der Straeten Ponthoz ===
In 1900, the club participated in the first edition of the Coupe Van der Straeten Ponthoz in 1900, regarded by many as the first-ever European club trophy. The tournament was held in Brussels and on 15 April, in the first round, RAP unexpectedly defeated the champions of Belgium, Racing Club, by 2 to 1. On the following day, in the semi-finals, RAP beat the champions of Switzerland, Grasshopper Club, again by the minimum margin of 3–2, with Jan van den Berg netting two of Amsterdam's goals. Finally, in the final on 17 April, RAP faced fellow Dutch club HVV Den Haag, who had succeeded them as the new champions of the Netherlands by winning the championship in 1899–1900. HVV were the favorites to win as they had trashed the hosts Léopold FC with a resounding 8–1 win in the first round and then comfortably got past the semi-finals with a 3–0 win. Furthermore, HVV had great national figures of that time such as Willem Hesselink, Miel Mundt, and Eetje Sol, the latter of which already had 5 goals in the tournament to his name. In the first half, HVV proved their favoritism by going ahead thanks to an own goal from RAP's goalkeeper, Koopman (sometimes credited to Beukema), but the Amsterdammers fought back and found an equalizer with 10 minutes to go, courtesy of van den Berg. It seemed RAP had just forced extra-time, however, just 5 minutes later, they found the winner via Jan Hisgen, thus lifting the first trophy of the competition. Coincidentally, Hisgen had also been the matchwinner of the 1899 KNVB Cup final against the same opponents.

Their victory in the final meant that in a space of three days, RAP played and defeated the reigning champions of Belgium, Switzerland, and the Netherlands. As these were the only existing leagues in continental Europe, the local newspapers at that time dubbed the tournament "the club championship of the continent". Thus, RAP might be considered the first ever continental European Champions, although this title is also contested by Vienna Cricket and Football-Club, who were the winners of the first Challenge Cup in 1897, a competition between clubs in Austria-Hungary. However, this tournament up until the 1900–01 season, only featured teams from Vienna, so the 7–0 win by Cricket over Wiener FC 1898 on 21 November 1897 may not be regarded as the first ever truly international club final, and hence, Cricket may not be regarded as the first European Champions.

=== 20th century ===
In the 1900–01 season, RAP finished in fourth place, followed by a fifth-place finish in 1901–02. In 1902–03 RAP hit rock bottom and finished last in the league, forcing them to play in a relegation playoff series, which they won, very narrowly escaping relegation. A few years later, the club would eventually be relegated to the second division anyway.

Although no longer relegated by the 1911–14 season, the team would always find themselves at the bottom of the table. Volharding (Dutch for Perseverance), which is the other old Amsterdam football club, found themselves in a similar predicament, always merely one or two points above RAP in the table, but still considered classified in the same section.

On 23 July 1914, it was announced in Sport Magazine, that the two clubs had decided to merge. The creation of the mentioned Volharding-RAP-Combination: VRC would bring an end to RAP's run. After a few more years of football, the club eventually abandoned the sport, and switched back to Cricket, renaming the club once more to the now-known VRA.

== Honours ==
=== National ===
- Netherlands Football League Championship: 5

1891–92, 1893–94, 1896–97, 1897–98, 1898–99

- De Telegraaf Cup: 1

1898–99

=== International ===
- Coupe Van der Straeten Ponthoz: 1

1900

== Results 1889–1914 ==
Results from 1889 to 1914

5	2	3	1	2	1	5	2	1	1	1	3	4	5	6	4	11	8	7	5	4	2	3	7	7	7
89	90	91	92	93	94	95	96	97	98	99	00	01	02	03	04	05	06	07	08	09	10	11	12	13	14
Eerste Klasse / Tweede Klasse
