= Belgium national football team results (unofficial matches) =

This is a list of the Belgium national football team's results from 1890 to the present day that, for various reasons, are not accorded the status of official internationals.

The nine games played between Belgium and England's amateur team are not considered official by the opponents; this also applies to a game played between Belgium and England in 1946, which is classified by the English FA as an unofficial 'Victory International'. While the Belgian Football Association does not take several Olympic Games matches of Belgium into account, according to the RSSSF there is no reason to doubt about the official character.

== 1890s ==
6 April 1890 International Friendly	Belgian XI (Belgium)	1–8	(England) Clapton FC	Antwerp, Belgium
		Report

27 December 1898 International Friendly	Belgium XI	0–2	(England) Alexandra Park FC	Brussels, Belgium
		Report	Goal

== 1900s ==
=== 1900 Summer Olympics ===
The first appearance of a Belgium national team came at the 1900 Summer Olympics, where a mixed team representing Belgium mostly made up of students from the Université de Bruxelles, played one match against France represented by Club Français, which ended in a 2–6 loss.

23 September 1900 1900 Summer Olympics	Club Français (France)	6–2	(Belgium) Université de Bruxelles	Paris, France
	Peltier 1' ?	Report	Spanoghe van Heuckelum	Stadium: Vélodrome de Vincennes; Attendance: 1,500; Referee: Jack Wood (Great Britain)

=== Coupe Vanden Abeele ===
The first four games played by a national selection of players active in Belgium and the Netherlands between 1901 and 1904, were not yet considered official because of the presence of English players in the "Belgian" squad. These four games were all contested in Antwerp, and the prize was a cup offered by Frédéric Vanden Abeele, the Coupe Vanden Abeele. A few weeks earlier, the "Vanden Abeele squad" played a preparatory match against a team made up of officers of Hounslow's Royal Fusiliers.

23 March 1901 Warm-up match	"Vanden Abeele team" (Belgium)	v	(England) Hounslow's Royal Fusiliers	Brussels, Belgium
		Report

28 April 1901 1901 Coupe Vanden Abeele	Belgium	8 – 0	Netherlands B ("van Hasselt XI")	Antwerp, Belgium
		Report		Stadium: Beerschot A.C. ground Attendance: 300; Referee: Charles Maggee

29 April 1901 International Friendly	Select Belgium	0 – 5	(England) Tunbridge Wells	Antwerp, Belgium
		Report1; Report2		Stadium: Beerschot A.C. ground

5 January 1902 1902 Coupe Vanden Abeele	Belgium	1 – 0	Netherlands	Antwerp, Belgium
	W. Potts	Report		Stadium: Beerschot A.C. ground

15 December 1902 1903 Coupe Vanden Abeele	Belgium	2 – 1	Netherlands	Antwerp, Belgium
	Blanchard (1–1); H. Potts (2–1)	Report	Lotsy (0–1)	Stadium: Beerschot A.C. ground

3 January 1904 1904 Coupe Vanden Abeele	Belgium	6 – 4	Netherlands	Antwerp, Belgium
	H. Potts (1–0); Feye (3–2)	Report	Bekker (1–1); Kamperdijk (2–2); Van den Berg (3–4); Wollenberg (4–4)	Stadium: Beerschot A.C. ground Referee: Herbert Willing (Netherlands)
Note: Belgium had originally announced to field an exclusively Belgian squad, but eventually replaced Paul Chibert (injured) with Herbert Potts, who contributed decisively to Belgium's win, scoring four goals.

=== English clubs ===
6 January 1906 International Friendly	Corinthian (England)	12 – 0	Belgium	Leyton, United Kingdom

6 May 1906 International Friendly	Select Belgium	1–2	(England) Southampton	Brussels, Belgium
		Report

30 March 1907 International Friendly	Select Belgium	0–2	(England) London Caledonians	Brussels, Belgium
		Report

31 March 1907 International Friendly	Select Belgium	2–7	(England) London Caledonians	Brussels, Belgium
		Report

31 March 1907 Paastoernooi	Select Belgium	2–6	(England) Upton Park	Brugge, Belgium
		Report

4 May 1907 International Friendly	Belgium XI	2–3	(England) Hull City	Brugge, Belgium
		Report

19 May 1907 Tournoi d'Oostende	Combined Belgium	1–10	(England) Fulham	Oostende, Belgium
		Report

5 January 1908 International Friendly	Select Belgium	4–1	(England) Shepherd's Bush	Brussels, Belgium
		Report

21 April 1908 International Friendly	Select Belgium	0–2	(England) Old Xaverians	Brussels, Belgium
		Report
Note: On the previous day, 20 April, Old Xaverians were knocked out from the semifinals of the 1908 Coupe Jean Dupuich by Royale Union Saint-Gilloise.

4 May 1908 International Friendly	Select Belgium	1–1	(England) Queens Park Rangers	Brussels, Belgium
		Report

8 June 1908 International Friendly	Belgium XI	1–6	(England) Bradford City	Verviers, Belgium
		Report

3 January 1909 International Friendly	Select Belgium	1–3	(England) Shepherd's Bush	Brussels, Belgium
		Report

14 March 1909 International Friendly	Select Belgium	2–3	(England) Dulwich Hamlet	Brussels, Belgium
		Report

28 December 1909 International Friendly	Select Belgium	1–6	(England) Oxford City	Brussels, Belgium
		Report

30 December 1909 International Friendly	Select Belgium	0–1	(England) Berks & Bucks	Brussels, Belgium
		Report

== 1910s ==
Between 1910 and 1913, "Select Belgium" played an annual match against a London League XI on All Saints' Day (1 November) in Brussels, losing two and winning two, the latter with an epic 5–4 win.

1 January 1910 International Friendly	Select Belgium	2–4	(England) Middlesex FA	Brussels, Belgium
		Report

6 March 1910 International Friendly	Select Belgium	4–1	(England) Berks & Bucks	Brussels, Belgium
		Report

16 May 1910 International Friendly	Belgium XI	1–7	(England) Chelsea FC	Brussels, Belgium
		Report1; Report2

1 November 1910 International Friendly	Select Belgium	0–5	(England) London League XI	Brussels, Belgium
		Report

25 December 1910 International Friendly	Select Belgium	1–6	(England) Middlesex County FA	Brussels, Belgium
		Report

1 November 1911 International Friendly	Select Belgium	5 – 2	(England) London League XI	Brussels, Belgium

24 December 1911 International Friendly	Select Belgium	4–0	(England) Middlesex County FA	Brussels, Belgium
		Report

1 November 1912 International Friendly	Select Belgium	2–4	(England) London League XI	Brussels, Belgium
		Report

1 November 1913 International Friendly	Select Belgium	5–4	(England) London League XI	Brussels, Belgium
		Report

=== Wartime matches ===
Football stayed popular during the war, and some popular clubs, such as Royal Antwerp and Beerschot, regrouped in the unoccupied parts of Belgium, and teams from different regiments competed against each other. In early 1915, a small group of Belgian players who had retreated to France formed a committee of the Belgian FA in Paris, which was able to organize matches between Belgium and French teams thanks to the generous intervention of the patron Eric Thornton, who rented the grounds, paid for travel, equipment, and Etcetera. When Albert I, King of the Belgians attended such a match, he noticed that the mandatory heavy army boots the soldiers had to relentlessly wear seriously hindered the game, so he supplied the Belgian army with 500 pairs of football boots, which allowed them to play with professional equipment. Shortly after, Armand Swartenbroeks founded the Belgian army's football team, containing former international players, such as Félix Balyu, Emile Hanse, Jan Van Cant, and Maurice Vandendriessche. In March 1915, they played their first match against an equivalent French team, winning 3–0, and on 6 February 1916, the Front Wanderers took the train from Ypres to Paris where they beat 'Les Bleus' (4–1) on 12 March.

These games and results are recognized as official only by the CFI, but not by FIFA, who categorized them as "War-time Internationals". The Dutch newspaper De Telegraaf, however, listed three France–Belgium matches in this period together with the matches between 1905 and 1914, without noting a difference in status. In the 1918 match, Albert I handed out a cup trophy for the winners. Also in this period, they faced Italy three times, two of which as a France-Belgium representative team.

1 January 1915 International friendly	Italy	6–2	France-Belgium representative team	Milan, Italy
	Fresia 9', 13', 50'; Cevenini III 84', 87'; Cevenini I 25'		Vialmonteil 36' van Hege 76'	Stadium: San Siro; Referee: Umberto Meazza (Italy)

3 January 1915 International friendly	Italy	2–3	France-Belgium representative team	Turin, Italy
	De Vecchi 10'; Santamaria 46'		Vialmonteil 19' van Hege 53', 80'	Stadium: Piazza d'armi Referee: Edoardo Pasteur (Italy)

?? March 1915 International Friendly	France	0 – 3	Belgium	Paris, France

12 March 1916 International Friendly	France	1 – 4	Belgium	Paris, France
	? (?)		Wertz (?) ? (?)	Attendance: 3,000; Referee: Scamoni (Italy)

=== 1916 Journées du Poilu Sportif ===
On 26 January 1916, Sporting, a French sports weekly magazine, decided to set up sports events across France at the end of April 1916. This initiative aimed to collect money and send balls and boxing gloves to French soldiers. The biggest sports event was a football tournament in the Paris area with seven different teams representing four countries, and Belgium won the tournament.

22 April 1916 Journées du Poilu Sportif quarter-final	Belgium	17–0	(France) FGSPF	Paris, France
	Balyu (?) ? (?)	Report		Stadium: Stade Chevaleret; Referee: Hjord (France)

23 April 1916 Journées du Poilu Sportif semi-final	Belgium	4–0	(France) LFA	Boulogne, France
	Balyu (?); Caremans (?)	Report		Stadium: Pavillon des Princes; Attendance: 2500; Referee: Atkins (England)

24 April 1916 Journées du Poilu Sportif final	Belgium	3–1	(France) USFSA	Saint-Ouen, France
	Balyu (?); Caremans (?)	Report	Vial (?)	Stadium: Stade de Paris; Attendance: 3,000

=== 1917 Belgian Front Wanderers ===
This football team, consisting of footballers from the Belgian military, became known as the Belgian Front Wanderers. On 16 December 1916, Louis van Hege, the Belgian star player of AC Milan also joined the team, and this gives the Front Wanders a new dimension, making the charity matches reaching an international level. Therefore, in June 1917, they faced Italy, and after an adventurous 48-hour train ride to Milan, the Belgian team beat the Italians on their home turf by a score of 4–3. They also faced two Italian clubs, Modena (5–0) and AC Milan (4–6). The Belgian Front Wanderers then toured Great Britain on 15-29 November 1917 to play charity matches for the benefit of Belgian war refugees and front-line soldiers in the trenches, playing six matches against British and Canadian army teams in the large stadiums of all the major English cities. The tour was a great success, and as a result, the Front Wanderers were again invited by the British in 1918, playing three matches there, but they also played at home; for instance, on 6 June, in the unoccupied Belgian town of Roesbrugge, they "obliterated the English 13–2".

3 June 1917 International friendly	Italy	3–4	Belgium	Milan, Italy
	Cevenini I 9' (?); Santamaria 78'	Report1; Report2	? 32' ? 38'; Van Cant 51'; Ballyn 58'	Stadium: Arena Civica; Referee: Mauro (Italy)

June 1917 International friendly	Modena (Italy)	0–5	Belgium	Como, Italy
		Report		Stadium: Stadio Giuseppe Sinigaglia

June 1917 International friendly	AC Milan (Italy)	6–4	Belgium	Milan, Italy
		Report		Stadium: Arena Civica

15 November 1917 International friendly	British Army XI (England)	4–1	(Belgium) Belgian Front Wanderers	London, England
		Report1; Report2		Stadium: Stamford Bridge

17 November 1917 International friendly	British Army XI (England)	1–2	(Belgium) Belgian Front Wanderers	Glasgow, Scotland
		Report1; Report2		Stadium: Celtic Park

21 November 1917 International friendly	British Army XI (England)	1–2	(Belgium) Belgian Front Wanderers	Liverpool, England
		Report1; Report2		Stadium: Goodison Park

22 November 1917 International friendly	Manchester XI (England)	1–1	(Belgium) Belgian Front Wanderers	Manchester, England
		Report1; Report2		Stadium: Old Trafford

24 November 1917 International friendly	British Army XI (England)	1–6	(Belgium) Belgian Front Wanderers	Birmingham, England
		Report1; Report2		Stadium: Aston Lower Grounds

28 November 1917 International friendly	Canadian Army XI (Canada)	1–6	(Belgium) Belgian Front Wanderers	Folkestone, England
		Report1; Report2		Stadium: Folkestone Cricket Ground

=== 1918 ===
22 April 1918 International Friendly	France	2 – 5	Belgium	Paris, France
	? (?)		? (?)	Stadium: Stade Bauer; Attendance: 3,000; Referee: Haworth (England)

6 June 1918 International Friendly	Belgian Front Wanderers (Belgium)	13 – 2	(England) British Army XI	West Flanders, Belgium
	? (?)		? (?)	Stadium: Roesbrugge

20 September 1918 International friendly	Italy	1–1	Belgium	Rome, Italy
	Santamaria 78'	Report	? 32'	Stadium: Stadio Nazionale PNF

22 September 1918 International friendly	Italy	1–1	Belgium	Rome, Italy
	Santamaria 78'	Report	? 32'	Stadium: Stadio Nazionale PNF

=== 1919 Inter-Allied Games ===
In the summer of 1919, Belgium participated in the Inter-Allied Games in Paris, on the occasion of the celebration of the Allied victory in World War I. This Belgian team featured five players who would go on to win the gold medal in the 1920 Summer Games in the following year. They comfortably beat Canada and the United States, which was the first time, official or otherwise, that Belgium faced a non-European team. However, a 1–4 loss to eventual champions Czechoslovakia on the opening day cost them a place in the final, although Belgium got their revenge by beating them in the final of the 1920 Olympics.

24 June 1919 Inter-Allied Games group stage	Czechoslovakia	4–1	Belgium	Paris, France
	Sedláček 24', 77'; Vaník 31'; Janda 46'		Flaminck 41'	Stadium: Stade Pershing

26 June 1919 Inter-Allied Games group stage	Belgium	5–2	Canada	Paris, France
	? (?)		? (?)	Stadium: Stade Pershing

28 June 1919 Inter-Allied Games group stage	Belgium	7–0	United States	Paris, France
	? (?)			Stadium: Stade Pershing

== 1920s ==
Apart from the official biannual Low Countries derbies, Belgium played against the Netherlands for diverse purposes in the 1920s; the 1925 and 1926 matches served as fundraisers for FIFA and charity, respectively, and in the 1929 match the Royal Dutch Football Association's 40th anniversary was celebrated.

8 February 1921 International Friendly	Belgium	2 – 0	(Netherlands) Zwaluwen	Brussels, Belgium
14:37 UTC+1	Bragard 23'; Thijs 90'			Stadium: Park Duden; Attendance: 10,000; Referee: Charles Barette (Belgium)

1 November 1921 International Friendly	Belgium	2 – 0	(England) London	Brussels, Belgium
				Stadium: Park Duden; Referee: Job Mutters (Netherlands)

1 March 1922 International Friendly	Belgium	2 – 2	(Netherlands) Zwaluwen	Brussels, Belgium
	Larnoe 56'; Hendrickx 74'		Blinckhof 23'; Petit 45'	Stadium: Park Duden; Attendance: 12,000; Referee: John Langenus

13 February 1923 International Friendly	Belgium	5 – 3	(Netherlands) Zwaluwen	Brussels, Belgium
14:32 UTC+1	Larnoe 21'; Musch 54'; Vandevelde 55'; Wertz 68'; Gillis 75'		van Linge 19'; Buitenweg (?); Formenoij (?)	Stadium: Park Duden; Attendance: 12,000; Referee: Christophe

17 February 1924 International Friendly	Belgium XI	1–5	(England) Queens Park Rangers	Antwerp, Belgium
		Report

10 June 1924 International Friendly	Belgium	5 – 0	Sweden	Brussels, Belgium

6 September 1925 International Friendly	Belgium	1 – 1	Netherlands	Antwerp, Belgium

29 August 1926 International Friendly	Netherlands	1 – 5	Belgium	Rotterdam, Netherlands
	Van Gelder 15'		Frenay 9'; Devos 37'; De Spae 39', 49', 66'

1 November 1927 International Friendly	Belgium	3 – 3	(England) London Amateurs

1927 or 1928 International Friendly	Belgium	1 – 3	(Netherlands) Zwaluwen	Belgium

12 February 1929 International Friendly	Zwaluwen (Netherlands)	1 – 0	Belgium	Amsterdam, Netherlands

1 November 1929 International Friendly	Belgium	7 – 3	(England) London Amateurs

8 December 1929 International Friendly	Netherlands	1 – 0	Belgium	Amsterdam, Netherlands

== 1930s ==
Outside the official biannual Low Countries derbies, Belgium faced the Netherlands for diverse reasons in the 1930s; the 1930 match served to inaugurate the new national stadium, the two matches in 1932 served as a fundraiser for FIFA and charity, and the 1939 match was at the occasion of the Royal Dutch Football Association's 50th anniversary.

4 March 1930 International Friendly	Belgium	5 – 0	(Netherlands) Zwaluwen	Brussels, Belgium
	Vanderbauwhede 37', 64'; Adams 56' (pen.), 72', 85'			Attendance: 18,000; Referee: Charlier

29 May 1930 International Friendly	Zwaluwen (Netherlands)	3 – 3	Belgium	Rotterdam, Netherlands
	Wendt 12'; Lagendaal (?); Everdingen 83'		Stijnen (?); Van Beeck 78'; Devidts 86'	Stadium: Sparta Stadion; Attendance: 20,000

14 September 1930 International Friendly	Belgium	4 – 1	Netherlands	Brussels, Belgium
14:17 UTC+1	Vanderbauwhede (?); Moeschal (?); Voorhoof (?)		Van Reenen (?)	Stadium: Jubilee Stadium; Attendance: 50,000; Referee: Cejnar (Czechoslovakia)

1 November 1930 International Friendly	Belgium	4 – 4	(England) London	Brussels, Belgium
				Stadium: Stade Joseph Marien

17 February 1931 International Friendly	Belgium	3 – 1	(Netherlands) Zwaluwen	Belgium
	Voorhoof 30' (?); Capelle 35'		Volkers (?)	Referee: Hamus (Luxembourg)

27 January 1932 International Friendly	Belgium	0 – 1	(Austria) Vienna	Brussels, Belgium
			Zischek 82'	Attendance: 25,000

14 February 1932 International Friendly	Netherlands	2 – 3	Belgium	Amsterdam, Netherlands
	Wels 36' van Nellen 47'		Versyp 31', 85'; Jean Capelle 87'	Referee: Rous (England)

16 October 1932 International Friendly	Belgium	2 – 3	Netherlands	Brussels, Belgium

23 November 1932 International Friendly	Belgium	4 – 1	(Czechoslovakia) Sparta Prague	Brussels, Belgium
	Versyp 6'; Vanden Eynde 36'; Capelle (?)		Silný 43'	Stadium: Jubilee Stadium

28 December 1932 International Friendly	Belgium	2 – 1	(Czechoslovakia) Slavia Prague	Brussels, Belgium
	Voorhoof 51', 66'		Joska 4'	Referee: Raphaël van Praag (Belgium)

22 November 1933 International Friendly	Belgium	1 – 5	(Czechoslovakia) Sparta Prague	Brussels, Belgium
				Stadium: Jubilee Stadium

7 February 1934 International Friendly	Belgium	6 – 3	(Netherlands) Zwaluwen	Brussels, Belgium
				Stadium: Heysel Stadion; Attendance: 3,000; Referee: Turfkruyer

10 May 1934 International Friendly	Belgium	4 – 1	Luxembourg	Liège, Belgium

1 January 1935 International Friendly	Belgium	5 – 6	(Austria) Austrian League selection	Brussels, Belgium

17 February 1935 International Friendly	Belgium	3 – 3	(Czechoslovakia) DFC Prag	Antwerp, Belgium

2 November 1936 International Friendly	Belgium	2 – 1	(England) London Combination	Brussels, Belgium
	Voorhoof 2', 20'		Smite 74'	Stadium: Jubilee Stadium; Attendance: 20,000; Referee: Finck (Germany)

16 April 1938 International Friendly	Police Belgium XI	0 – 1	(England) Old Malvernians
		Report

4 January 1939 International Friendly	Belgium	5 – 4	(England) Crystal Palace	Brussels, Belgium
	Isemborghs (?)			Stadium: Stade Joseph Marien; Attendance: 5,000

21 February 1939 International Friendly	Belgium	4 – 3	(England) London Combination	Brussels, Belgium
	R. Braine (?); Voorhoof (?); Buyle (?), 84'		Scott 51'; Fisher (?); Vinall (?)	Attendance: 20,000; Referee: Pforrmann (Luxembourg)

16 April 1939 International Friendly	Zwaluwen (Netherlands)	3 – 2	Belgium	Rotterdam, Netherlands
	Hazeweyer 18' de Bock (?) de Boer (?)		R. Braine 29'; Ceuleers 44'	Attendance: 12,000

30 April 1939 International Friendly	Belgium	5 – 2	"West-Germany"	Brussels, Belgium
				Stadium: Heysel Stadion; Attendance: 8,000

4 June 1939 International Friendly	Select Belgium	1 – 5	(England) Arsenal	Brussels, Belgium
		Report

10 December 1939 International Friendly	Netherlands	5 – 2	Belgium	Rotterdam, Netherlands

== 1940s ==
During the occupation of Belgium in World War II, Belgium played multiple unofficial friendlies abroad against teams of allied nations. These included two selections of the English FA that contained some Scottish and Welsh players at both occasions.

1 February 1941 International Friendly	Netherlands	3 – 3	Belgium	London, United Kingdom
15:00	Van der Gender (?)		Schuermans (?); Kennens (?)

11 October 1941 International Friendly	Netherlands	4 – 5	Belgium	London, United Kingdom
	Luttmer 10'; Van Elsacker 23'; Van der Gender 53' (?)		Schuermans 32', 40', 50'; De Busser 35'; Clerikx (?)	Stadium: Wembley Stadium

10 February 1942 International Friendly	England	4 – 0	Belgium	Aldershot, United Kingdom
	Lawton (?); Compton (?)			Stadium: The Recreation Ground

12 December 1942 International Friendly	Netherlands	0 – 0	Belgium	Brentford, United Kingdom
				Stadium: Griffin Park

11 April 1943 International Friendly	Belgium	4 – 2	Netherlands	Leipzig, Germany
				Stadium: Bruno-Plache-Stadion; Attendance: 10,000

8 May 1943 International Friendly	France	0 – 7	Belgium	London, United Kingdom
				Stadium: Shepherd's Bush

?? January 1944 International Friendly	Netherlands	3 – 2	Belgium	London, United Kingdom
				Attendance: 5,000

1 October 1944 International Friendly	Belgium	0 – 3	(United Kingdom) FA Services XI	Brussels, Belgium
			Barnes (?); Smellinckx (?); Drake (?)	Stadium: Stade du Daring Club de Bruxelles; Attendance: 28,000; Referee: Franken (Belgium)

6 January 1945 International Friendly	Belgium	2 – 3	(United Kingdom) Scottish Services XI	Brussels, Belgium
	Buyle 20'; Coppens 60'	Report	Andy Black 25', 40'; Fagan 70'	Stadium: Stade du Daring Club de Bruxelles; Attendance: 25,000
Note: The aircraft taking the Scotland party on Thursday 4 January 1945 was forced to turn back due to weather conditions when it was within 15 minutes' flying time of Brussels. The party arrived just a day before the match.

25 March 1945 International Friendly	Belgium	2 – 3	(United Kingdom) FA Services XI	Brussels, Belgium
	Van Den Audenaerde (?); Nicolay (?)		Lawton (?)	Stadium: Stade du Daring Club de Bruxelles; Attendance: 30,000; Referee: Wiltshire (England)

10 February 1948 International Friendly	Belgium	2 - 1	(England) London Combination	Charleroi, Belgium
15:00	Van Den Audenaerde 40'; Van Den Bosch 90'		Parsons 44'	Stadium: Neuvillestadion; Attendance: ? Referee: ?

== 2010s ==
The matches against Romania on 14 November 2012 and against Luxembourg on 26 May 2014 were scheduled as official friendlies but afterwards not recognized by FIFA because of Romania's 8 substitutions and Belgium's 7 substitutions respectively, while only 6 were allowed. The Belgian and Czech football federations were too late in asking that the match against Czech Republic on 5 June 2017 would be official.

14 November 2012 International Friendly	Romania	2 – 1	Belgium	Bucharest, Romania
20:00 UTC+1	Maxim 32'; Torje 66'	Report	Benteke 23'	Stadium: Arena Națională; Attendance: 6,000; Referee: Mauro Bergonzi (Italy)

26 May 2014 International Friendly	Belgium	5 – 1	Luxembourg	Genk, Belgium
20:45 UTC+2	Lukaku 3', 23', 53'; Chadli 71'; De Bruyne 90+1' (pen.)	Report	Joachim 13'	Stadium: Cristal Arena; Attendance: 23,000; Referee: Tom Harald Hagen (Norway)

5 June 2017 International Friendly	Belgium	2 – 1	Czech Republic	Brussels, Belgium
20:45 (UTC+2)	Batshuayi 25'; Fellaini 52'	Report	Krmenčík 29'	Stadium: King Baudouin Stadium; Referee: Sandro Schärer (Switzerland)
