= Journées du Poilu Sportif =

1916 Journées du Poilu Sportif
Hairy Sportsman Days

Tournament details
- Country: France
- Dates: 22 – 24 April
- Teams: 7

Final positions
- Champions: Belgium
- Runners-up: (France) Union (USFSA)

Tournament statistics
- Matches played: 7
- Goals scored: 36 (5.14 per match)
- Top goal scorer(s): (Belgium) Félix Balyu (at least 8 goals)

The Journées du Poilu Sportif (English: Hairy Sportsman Days) was a sports events held across France organized by the French sports weekly magazine Sporting. The goal of this initiative was to collect money and to send balls and boxing gloves to French soldiers. The biggest sports event was a football tournament in the Paris area with seven different teams representing four countries; Belgium won the tournament.

== Background ==
After having ceased in the fall of 1914 due to the outbreak of the First World War, sporting competitions and spectacles gradually resumed from 1915 and especially in 1916, first justified by the need to train the next generation of sports and military personnel and to celebrate the fraternity uniting the allies, and later justified for charitable causes, even becoming the laboratory for certain successful competitions between the wars.

In France, from the first months of the conflict, the four federations administering football in France set up "war" competitions, which given the mobilization of Frenchmen to the war, were competitions contested by players aged under twenty. The Union des Sociétés Françaises de Sports Athlétiques (USFSA), the main and oldest French multi-sports federation, organized a National Cup and an Allied Cup; the Ligue de Football Association (LFA) created the Challenge de la Renommée, and the 1916–17 LFA Interfederal Cup; the Gymnastic and Sports Federation of French Patronages (FGSPF) also had its National Cup; and the small French Amateur Cycling Federation (FCAF) held its FCAF Football Championship and the Challenge des Espoirs. The latter, in which 127 school or club teams representing the entire non-invaded national territory participated, the weekly newspaper Sporting promoted it in March 1916, stating that it was "both sporting and patriotic. The young people who will compete for the Cup are our footballers and our soldiers of tomorrow. They must be the object of all our concern".

During the war, the French daily newspaper devoted to sport L'Auto was concerned with the sporting future of the French soldiers, so from November 1914 onwards, it began publicizing the requests for balls and boxing gloves sent to the front by sportsmen in its section "Please balls for the soldiers". As of 9 January 1915, L'Auto had been able to "send to soldier players" a total of 112 balloons for approximately 500 requests. Later that year, L'Auto created another charitable work called marraines de guerre ("war godmothers"), which was aimed to meet other sporting needs, such as boxing gloves, jerseys, and shorts, but also checkers, film cameras, readings, and even godmothers. In any case, L'Auto had launched a type of work that went beyond the limits of the sports press, and following its example, Sporting decided on 26 January 1916 to promote its Journée du Poilu Sportif at the end of April 1916 to collect money and to send balls and boxing gloves to French soldiers.

Many people criticized these endeavors because they failed to see the utility of sending footballs to soldiers at a time when the French army was threatened by mutinies, but to justify these campaigns, the journalist Georges Rozet explained it best in an article dating to May 1917: "Leather wears out quickly on these improvised grounds behind the line of fire.[…] No leather crisis can be objected to. You, the elegant auxiliary, strapped and booted; you, the unknown godmother whose stems never rise high enough, you owe a propitiatory gift to the fighter who, to keep himself in shape, only asks for a ball. If there is a national leather, it is this one".

== Participants ==
The tournament was contested by 7 teams, Union (USFSA), Ligue (LFA), FCAF, FGSPF, Entente Britannique, Entente Belge, and Entente Suisse.

Teams	Town	Notes	Jersey colour
(France) Union	Union des sociétés françaises de sports athlétiques (USFSA)	One of the founders of FIFA in 1904 which left FIFA in 1909	Blue
(France) Ligue	Ligue de Football Association (LFA)	Created in 1910 by four Parisian clubs CA Paris-Charenton, Red Star Amical Club, US Suisse Paris, and Paris Star, which left USFSA because they wanted to rejoin FIFA in order to play international teams	Dark blue
(France) F.C.A.F.	Fédération cycliste et athlétique de France (FCAF)		White
(France) F.G.S.P.F.	Fédération gymnastique et sportive des patronages de France (FGSPF)		Orange
(United Kingdom) Entente Britannique	Great-Britain XI	Managed by corporal Pueren; players came from British military camps based in Paris, Le Havre, Rouen, and Marseille	White
(Belgium) Entente Belge	Belgique XI	Managed by Mr Falize, president of the French Committee of the Belgian Football Association	Red
(Switzerland) Entente Suisse	Switzerland XI	Set up by Mr Ducimetière and Baumberger, composed of Swiss players living in Paris and members of the Union Sportive Suisse de Paris	Red and White

== Squads ==
The Belgium squad fielded six players that earned caps with the official national team: Émile Hanse (11), Jan Van Cant (10), Jean Bouttiau (6), Paul Bouttiau (4), Balyu (1), and Pierre Kogel (1). Paul Bouttiau died three months later in July 1916 at Calais. Maurice Vandendriessche, who twice played for France in 1908, played for Belgium under the pseudonym Van den Dey.

The Union (USFSA) squad fielded four players that earned caps with the official side: Jean Ducret (20), Maurice Cottenet (18), Eugène Langenove (2), and Félix Vial (1).

Grunig of the Union Sportive Suisse de Paris played both for Entente Suisse in the quarterfinal and the LFA in the third-place match.

== Overview ==
With the help of sports federations, football matches and athletics competitions were organized on Saturday 23 April and Sunday 24 April.

=== Results ===
Quarter-finals
22 April - Paris
(France) Union (USFSA)	6
(France) FCAF	2
(United Kingdom) Entente Britannique	Bye
22 April - Montrouge
(Belgium) Entente Belge	17
(France) FGSPF	0
22 April - Paris
(France) Ligue	2
(Switzerland) Entente Suisse	1

Semi-finals
23 April - Boulogne
(France) Union (USFSA)	0
(United Kingdom) Entente Britannique	0
23 April - Boulogne
(Belgium) Entente Belge	4
(France) Ligue	0

Final
24 April – Saint-Ouen
(France) Union (USFSA)	1
(Belgium) Entente Belge	3

=== Quarterfinals ===
22 April 1916

(France) Union (USFSA)	6–2	(France) FCAF
Nicolas (pen.) (pen.); Devic	Report	Vialmonteil (pen.); Barillet

Stade Brancion, Paris, France
Referee: Jursanson (France)
22 April 1916

Belgium XI	17–0	(France) FGSPF
Balyu ?' ? ?'	Report

Stade Chevaleret, Paris, France
Referee: Hjord (France)
22 April 1916

(France) LFA	2–1	Switzerland XI
Michon; Ninot	Report	Grunig (pen.)

Pavillon des Princes, Boulogne, France
Referee: Lebrun (England)

=== Semi-final ===
23 April 1916
17:00

(France) Union (USFSA)	0 – 0	(United Kingdom) Entente Britannique
? 85'	Report	?

Roubaix Velodrome, Roubaix, France
Attendance: 4,000
Referee: Gardner (England)

Note: At first, the French team decided to let the British team play the final, but the British made the opposite proposal; after talks and approval from the British military HQ in Paris, Union (USFSA) entered the final.

23 April 1916

Belgium XI	4–0	(France) LFA
Balyu ?'; Caremans ?'	Report

Pavillon des Princes, Boulogne, France
Attendance: 2500
Referee: Atkins (England)

=== Third place play-off ===
24 April 1916

(United Kingdom) Entente Britannique	1–0	(France) LFA
Hampson	Report

Stade de Paris, Saint-Ouen, France
Attendance: 2500
Referee: Rémy (France)

=== Final ===
24 April 1916

Belgium XI	3–1	(France) Union (USFSA)
Balyu ?'; Caremans ?'	Report	Vial ?'

Stade de Paris, Saint-Ouen, France
Attendance: 3000

== Legacy ==
In total, they achieved 7,406 francs and 45 centimes, plus 14 footballs, 21 rugby balls and 98 pairs of boxing gloves, with the editors of Sporting declaring themselves "fully satisfied with [their] work, and with its excellent results from all points of view".

Two members of the Belgian winning squad, Félix Balyu and Emile Hanse, both played at the 1919 Inter-Allied Games, and then won Olympic gold with Belgium in the 1920 Games. Three players of the Union (USFSA) squad were finalists at the 1919 Inter-Allied Games: Paul Nicolas, Eugène Langenove, and Emilien Devicq.
