= Jean Van Cant =

Belgian footballer

Personal information
- Date of birth: 6 June 1891
- Place of birth: Belgium
- Date of death: 20 March 1926 (aged 34)
- Position: Forward

Senior career*
Years	Team	Apps	(Gls)
1910–1921	Racing Club Mechelen		

International career
1912–1914	Belgium	10	(7)
1916	Belgium (unofficial)	+3	(+0)
1917	Belgian Front Wanderers	6	(+0)
- * Club domestic league appearances and goals

Jean "Jan" Van Cant (6 June 1891 – 20 March 1926) was a Belgian international footballer who played as a forward for Racing Club Mechelen and the Belgian national team.

== Playing career ==
Van Cant began his career at Racing Club Mechelen, and he remained loyal to the club for over 10 years until 1921, even when it was relegated to Division 2 in 1912, but this did not prevent the player from being selected for the national team between 1912 and 1914, scoring 7 goals in 10 appearances for Belgium, including two goals on his debut against Switzerland on 20 February 1912, and a hat-trick against Germany on 23 November 1913, to help his side to a 6–3 win.

In early 1915, Van Cant, together with a small group of Belgian players who had retreated to France because of WWI, formed a committee of the Belgian FA in Paris, which organized one match against France every year. Even though this Belgian team had some former internationals, such as Van Cant, Emile Hanse, Félix Balyu, and Maurice Vandendriessche, its games and its results are recognized as official only by the CFI, but not by FIFA, who categorized them as "War-time Internationals". In total, Van Cant played at least three games for Belgium, all of which during their triumphant campaign at the Journées du Poilu Sportif in 1916, beating three teams each represented by a different French federation (FGSPF and LFA), including a 3–1 win over the USFSA in the final. He was also a member of the Belgian Front Wanderers, the team that toured Great Britain on 15–29 November 1917 to play charity matches for the benefit of Belgian war refugees and front-line soldiers in the trenches, playing six matches against British and Canadian army teams in the large stadiums of all the major English cities.

In total, Van Cant scored 13 goals in 61 matches in Division 1.

== Career statistics ==
=== International goals ===
Belgium score listed first, score column indicates score after each Van Cant goal.

List of international goals scored by Jean Van Cant
No.	Date	Venue	Opponent	Score	Result	Competition
1	20 February 1912	Stadion Broodstraat, Antwerp, Belgium	Switzerland	1–0	9–2	Friendly match
2	20 February 1912	Stadion Broodstraat, Antwerp, Belgium	Switzerland	2–0	9–2	Friendly match
3	23 November 1913	Stadion Broodstraat, Antwerp, Belgium	Germany	2–0	6–2	Friendly match
4	23 November 1913	Stadion Broodstraat, Antwerp, Belgium	Germany	3–0	6–2	Friendly match
5	23 November 1913	Stadion Broodstraat, Antwerp, Belgium	Germany	6–2	6–2	Friendly match
6	25 January 1914	Stade Victor Boucquey, Lille, France	France	1–0	3–4	Friendly match
6	26 April 1914	Old Stadion, Amsterdam, Netherlands	Netherlands	1–2	2–4	1914 Rotterdamsch Nieuwsblad Beker
