= Switzerland national football team results (unofficial matches) =

- Win Draw Loss

This is a list of the Switzerland national football team's results from 1898 to the present day that, for various reasons, are not accorded the status of official internationals.

== 1890s ==
An early attempt to create a Switzerland national team occurred in the late 1890s, when Swiss elevens played against South-Germany selections and an Italian eleven, beating the latter 0–2 in Turin.

4 December 1898 International friendly	Switzerland XI	3–1	(Germany) South-Germany	Basel, Switzerland
		Report

26 March 1899 International friendly	Switzerland XI	1–3	(Germany) South-Germany	Zurich, Switzerland
		Report

30 April 1899 International friendly	Italy XI (Italy)	0–2	Switzerland XI	Turin, Italy
		Report1; Report2		Stadium: Velodrome Humbert I Referee: Henry Goodley (England)

== 1900s ==
8 April 1900 International friendly	South-Germany (Germany)	2–0	Switzerland XI	Strasbourg, Germany
		Report

14 April 1900 International friendly	Select Genève (Switzerland)	1–5	(England) Surrey Wanderers	Geneva, Switzerland
		Report

15 April 1900 International friendly	Select Suisse Romande (Switzerland)	0–5	(England) Surrey Wanderers	Geneva, Switzerland
		Report

20 January 1901 International friendly	Switzerland XI	4–7	(Germany) South-Germany	Basel, Switzerland
		Report

7 April 1901 International friendly	(Czech Republic) SK Slavia Prague	4–0	Switzerland XI	Prague, Czechoslovakia
		Report

8 April 1901 International friendly	Austria	4–0	Switzerland XI	Vienna, Austria
		Report

5 May 1908 International friendly	Select Zürich (Switzerland)	2–4	(England) Manchester United	Zurich, Switzerland
		Report

== 1910s ==
1 November 1911 International friendly	Wiener AC (Austria)	4–1	Switzerland XI	Vienna, Austria
	?	Report	P. Wyss

31 May 1914 International friendly	Central Switzerland	0–1	(Germany) South-Germany	Bern, Switzerland
		Report

=== 1916 Journées du Poilu Sportif ===
On 26 January 1916, Sporting, a French sports weekly magazine, decided to set up sports events across France at the end of April 1916, and the biggest sports event was a football tournament in the Paris area with seven different teams representing four countries. The Entente Suisse was set up by Mr Ducimetière and Baumberger, and it was composed by Swiss players living in Paris and members of the Union sportive suisse de Paris.

22 April 1916 Journées du Poilu Sportif quarter-final	LFA (France)	2–1	(Switzerland) Entente Suisse	Boulogne, France
	Michon; Ninot	Report	Grunig (pen.)	Stadium: Pavillon des Princes; Referee: Lebrun (England)

== 1920s ==
10 June 1920 International friendly	Stockholm XI (Sweden)	4–2	Switzerland XI	Stockholm, Sweden
	?	Report	Martenet; Merkt	Referee: Willem Eijmers (Netherlands)

13 June 1920 International friendly	Norrköping XI (Sweden)	3–0	Switzerland XI	Norrköping, Sweden
		Report		Referee: (Sweden)

27 May 1923 International friendly	Select Zürich (Switzerland)	1–5	(England) Bolton Wanderers	Zurich, Switzerland
		Report

10 June 1923 International friendly	Alsace (France)	3–1	Western Switzerland	Strasbourg, Germany
		Report

24 June 1923 International friendly	Fredrikstad XI (Norway)	0–2	Switzerland XI	Fredrikstad, Norway
		Report	A. Abegglen; Afflerbach	Referee: Sedwick (Norway)

22 July 1923 International friendly	South-Germany (Germany)	3–3	Central Switzerland	Karlsruhe, Germany
		Report

25 May 1924 International friendly	Central Switzerland	3–1	(Germany) South-Germany	Biel/Bienne, Switzerland
		Report		Attendance: 2,500

26 October 1924 International friendly	Western Switzerland	1–0	(France) Alsace	Neuchâtel, Switzerland
		Report

17 May 1925 International friendly	Tyrol (Austria)	1–2	East Switzerland	Innsbruck, Austria
		Report

15 May 1926 International friendly	Select Bern (Switzerland)	2–4	(England) Huddersfield Town	Bern, Switzerland
		Report

30 May 1926 International friendly	South-Germany (Germany)	1–4	Central Switzerland	Freiburg im Breisgau, Germany
		Report

6 June 1926 International friendly	East Switzerland	7–0	(Austria) Tyrol	St. Gallen, Switzerland
		Report

29 August 1926 International friendly	Switzerland XI	5–2	Belgium	Basel, Switzerland
	Poretti; Brand; Sturzenegger	Report	?	Attendance: 6,000; Referee: Johannes Mutters (Netherlands)

22 May 1929 International friendly	Select Bern (Switzerland)	1–4	(England) Sheffield Wednesday	Bern, Switzerland
		Report

16 June 1929 International friendly	Tyrol (Austria)	3–5	East Switzerland	Innsbruck, Austria
		Report

== 1930s ==
22 June 1930 International friendly	Drammen XI (Norway)	0–4	Switzerland	Drammen, Norway
		Report	Chabanel; Baumeister; Weiler I	Referee: Beck (Norway)

9 August 1931 International friendly	Switzerland XI	2–2	(Austria) Vienna	Bern, Switzerland
	A. Abegglen	Report	?	Stadium: Neufeld Stadion; Referee: Paul Ruoff (Switzerland)

30 August 1931 International friendly	Switzerland XI	3–1	(Italy) SS Lazio	Bern, Switzerland
	Passello 25'; Kramer 38', 44'	Report	?	Stadium: Neufeld Stadion; Attendance: 10,000; Referee: René Mercet (Switzerland)

15 May 1934 International friendly	Select Switzerland	1–3	(England) West Ham	Zurich, Switzerland
		Report

16 May 1934 International friendly	Select Switzerland	3–1	(England) West Ham	Zurich, Switzerland
		Report

13 May 1936 International friendly	Select Switzerland	0–1	(England) West Ham	Zurich, Switzerland
		Report

24 May 1939 International friendly	Switzerland XI	3–2	(England) Everton	Switzerland
		Report

On the occasion of the Swiss National Exhibition of 1939, Switzerland played two matches against a North Italy selection and against an Vienna XI.

11 June 1939 International friendly	Switzerland	1–7	(Italy) North Italy	Zurich, Switzerland
	Amadò 26' (pen.)	Report	?	Attendance: 12,000; Referee: Charles E. Argent (England)

25 June 1939 International friendly	Switzerland XI	0–0	(Austria) Ostmark (Vienna XI)	Zurich, Switzerland
		Report		Attendance: 8,000; Referee: Francesco Mattea (Italy)

== 1940s ==
2 April 1940 International friendly	Croatia	4–0	Switzerland	Zagreb, Croatia
	Passello 25'; Kramer 38', 44'	Report		Stadium: HŠK Građanski Zagreb; Attendance: 8,000; Referee: Giuseppe Scarpi (Italy)

21 April 1940 International friendly	Switzerland	0–1	Croatia	Bern, Switzerland
		Report		Stadium: Wankdorf Stadium; Attendance: 15,000; Referee: Raffaele Scorzoni (Italy)

4 April 1943 International friendly	Switzerland	1–0	Croatia	Zurich, Switzerland
	Amadò 13'	Report		Stadium: Hardturm; Attendance: 25,000; Referee: Generoso Dattilo (Italy)

28 January 1945 International friendly	Western Switzerland	4–1	(Lyon) Lyon XI	Geneva, Switzerland
	Hasler 23', 31'; Monnard 29'; Amey	Report	?	Stadium: Charmilles Stadium; Attendance: 6,000; Referee: Rudolphe Wittwer (Switzerland)

21 July 1945 International friendly	Switzerland	3–1	England	Bern, Switzerland
	Fink 15'; Friedländer 52'; Amadò 80'	Report	?	Stadium: Wankdorf Stadium; Attendance: 50,000; Referee: Victor Sdez (France)
Note: On the occasion of the 50th anniversary of ASFA.

17 March 1946 International friendly	Lyon XI (Lyon)	3–3	Western Switzerland	Lyon, France
	?	Report	Morier 65'; Rosetti; Beerli	Stadium: Stade de Gerland; Attendance: 10,000; Referee: Veyret (France)

17 March 1946 International friendly	Alsace XI (France)	1–0	Ostern Switzerland	Strasbourg, Germany
	?	Report		Stadium: Stade de la Meinau; Attendance: 11,000; Referee: Louis Fauquemberghe (France)

17 April 1948 International friendly	Switzerland XI	2–3	(Austria) Lower Austria	Winterthur, Switzerland
	Berbig; Kohler (pen.)	Report	?	Stadium: Stadion Schützenwiese; Attendance: 4,500; Referee: Josef Schürch (Switzerland)

18 April 1948 International friendly	East Switzerland	1–3	(Austria) Austria B	Arbon, Switzerland
	Quinche 44' (pen.)	Report	?	Stadium: Allmend Stadion; Attendance: 10,000; Referee: Hans Vogt (Switzerland)

3 April 1949 International friendly	Lower Austria (Austria)	2–4	Switzerland Espoirs	Sankt Pölten, Austria
	?	Report	Lusenti 15'; Schönmann 22'; Raymond 33', 55'	Attendance: 8,000; Referee: Jiranek (Austria)

29 May 1949 International friendly	Switzerland XI	1–1	(England) England Amateurs	Luzern, Switzerland
	? 18' (o.g.)	Report	?	Stadium: Stadion Allmend; Attendance: 10,000; Referee: Hans Vogt (Switzerland)

== 1950s ==
18 January 1950 International friendly	England B (England)	5–0	Switzerland XI	Sheffield, England
		Report		Stadium: Hillsborough Stadium; Attendance: 43,053; Referee: Reginald Leafe (England)

3 June 1951 International friendly	Switzerland Espoirs	0–5	(France) France Amateur	Martigny, France
		Report		Stadium: Forum d'Octodure; Attendance: 4,000; Referee: Jorssen (Belgium)

1 June 1952 International friendly	France Amateur (France)	2–4	Switzerland Espoirs	Annecy, France
	?	Report	Scheller 52', 68'; Meier 73'; Fesselet 80'	Stadium: Stade du Coteau; Attendance: 4,000; Referee: Lescart (Belgium)

29 June 1952 International friendly	Germany Olympic (Germany)	2–3	Switzerland Espoirs	Kiel, Germany
	?	Report	Mauron 55', 68' ?	Stadium: Holstein-Stadion; Attendance: 30,000; Referee: Leo Helge (Denmark)

22 October 1952 International friendly	Switzerland XI	2–2	(Italy) North Italy	Bern, Switzerland
	Fatton 31'; Hügi 70'	Report	?	Stadium: Wankdorf Stadium; Referee: René Baumberger (Switzerland)

3 July 1953 International friendly	Norway XI (Norway)	2–2	Switzerland XI	Sarpsborg, Norway
	?	Report	? (o.g.); Kernen	Attendance: 6,000

2 September 1953 International friendly	West Germany (Germany)	2–0	Switzerland XI	Konstanz, Germany
	?	Report		Stadium: Bodensee Stadion; Attendance: 23,000; Referee: Bernardini (Italy)

11 October 1953 International friendly	Switzerland XI	1–2	(Germany) West Germany B	Basel, Switzerland
	Meier 37'	Report	?	Stadium: Stadion Rankhof; Referee: Jacques Devillers (France)

26 March 1958 International friendly	Switzerland XI	1–2	(Germany) Germany XI	Basel, Switzerland
	Riva 33'	Report	?	Stadium: St. Jakob Stadium; Attendance: 35,000; Referee: P. Mourat (France)

== 1960s ==
12 April 1961 International friendly	Switzerland XI	0–5	Austria	Basel, Switzerland
		Report	?	Stadium: St. Jakob Stadium; Attendance: 20,000; Referee: Josef Kandlbinder (Germany)

11 October 1961 International friendly	Switzerland XI	8–1	Morocco	Lausanne, Switzerland
	Pottier 28', 56', 58'; Frigerio 35', 88'; Antenen 61', 69'; Wüest 85'	Report	?	Stadium: Stade Olympique de la Pontaise; Attendance: 11,000; Referee: Gottfried Dienst (Switzerland)

11 February 1962 International friendly	Morocco	3–1	Switzerland XI	Casablanca, Morocco
	?	Report	Frigerio	Stadium: Honor Stadium; Attendance: 5,000; Referee: ? (Morocco)

17 March 1965 International friendly	Israel	2–0	Switzerland XI	Jaffa, Israel
	?	Report		Attendance: 22,000; Referee: Nikolaos Yannopoulos (Greece)

19 April 1966 International friendly	Switzerland XI	6–4	Morocco	Grenchen, Switzerland
	Hertig 3', 86'; Allemann 27', 78'; Künzli 37', 52'	Report	?	Stadium: Stadion Brühl; Attendance: 6,000; Referee: Pierre Schwinte (France)

8 January 1967 International friendly	Mexico	0–2	Switzerland XI	Guadalajara, Mexico
		Report	Hosp 42'; Blättler 76'	Stadium: Estadio Jalisco; Attendance: 30,000; Referee: Arturo Yamasaki (Peru)

1 March 1967 International friendly	Luxembourg	1–0	Switzerland XI	Differdange, Luxembourg
	?	Report		Stadium: Stade du Thillenberg; Attendance: 450; Referee: Franz Geluck (Belgium)

== 1970s ==
30 April 1970 International friendly	Switzerland XI	0–0	Soviet Union	Bern, Switzerland
		Report		Attendance: 5,000; Referee: Colling (Luxemburg)

13 April 1977 International friendly	Switzerland	0–0	Italy B	Basel, Switzerland
		Report		Stadium: St. Jakob Stadium; Attendance: 9,000; Referee: Michel Vautrot (France)

8 November 1978 International friendly	Italy B	1–0	Switzerland	Ferrara, Italy
	?	Report		Stadium: Stadio Paolo Mazza; Attendance: 7,000; Referee: Michel Kitabdjan (France)

== 1980s ==
9 March 1982 International friendly	Liechtenstein	0–1	Switzerland XI	Balzers, Liechtenstein
		Report	Brügger 7'	Stadium: Sportplatz Rheinau; Attendance: 4,500; Referee: Jakob Baumann (Switzerland)

== 1990s ==
19 January 1992 International friendly	UAE Olympics (United Arab Emirates)	0–2	Switzerland	Dubai, United Arab Emirates
		Report	Sutter 16'; Dietlin 38'	Stadium: Al Ahli Stadium; Attendance: 200
