= Félix Balyu =

Belgian footballer (1891–1971)

Personal information
- Date of birth: 5 August 1891
- Place of birth: Liège, Belgium
- Date of death: 15 January 1971 (aged 79)
- Place of death: Liège, Belgium
- Position: Goalkeeper

Youth career
- 1908–1910: Club Brugge

Senior career*
Years	Team	Apps	(Gls)
1911–1923	Club Brugge		
1923–1925	FC Rouen		
1925–1930	US Tourquennoise		

International career
1916	Belgium (unofficial)	4	(+8)
1917	Belgian Front Wanderers	+2	(0)
1920	Belgium	1	(0)
Medal record
Men's football
Representing Belgium
Olympic Games
Gold medal – first place	1920 Antwerp	Team
- * Club domestic league appearances and goals

Félix Charles Louis Balyu (5 August 1891 – 15 January 1971) was a Belgian footballer who played as a goalkeeper for Club Brugge and US Tourquennoise. He represented the Belgium national team at the 1920 Olympic Games in Antwerp, where they won a gold medal.

== Club career ==
Balyu began his football career in the youth ranks of Club Brugge in 1908, at age 17, and made his senior debut in 1911. He helped the club reach the 1914 Belgian Cup final at Stade du Vivier d'Oie, which ended in a 2–1 loss to Royale Union Saint-Gilloise. Balyu played a crucial role in helping Brugge win its first-ever Belgian Championship in 1919–20, scoring 23 goals. He stayed loyal to the club for over a decade until 1923, when he left for FC Rouen. In 1925, he moved to US Tourquennoise, where he was also in charge of training young people. In 1928, the French newspaper L'Auto described the 37-year-old Balyu as "the oldest player in France".

== International career ==
In early 1915, Balyu, together with a small group of Belgian players who had retreated to France because of WWI, formed a committee of the Belgian FA in Paris, which organized one match against France every year. Even though this Belgian team had some former internationals, such as Balyu, Emile Hanse, Jan Van Cant, or Maurice Vandendriessche, its games and its results are recognized as official only by the CFI, but not by FIFA, who categorized them as "War-time Internationals". In total, Balyu played at least three games for Belgium, all of which during their triumphant campaign at the Journées du Poilu Sportif in 1916, scoring at least eight goals against three different French teams, four in a 17–0 win over FGSPF in the quarter-finals, a brace in a 4–0 win over the LFA in the semifinals, and another brace in a 3–1 win over the USFSA in the final. He was also a member of the Belgian Front Wanderers, the team that toured England in 1917, where they played against the British and Canadian army on 25 and 28 November.

Balyu only earned his first (and last) international cap for the official Belgium national team on 29 August 1920, in the first round of the football tournament of the 1920 Olympic Games in Antwerp, which ended in a 3–1. Balyu was never selected again as Belgium won the gold medal after beating Czechoslovakia 2–0 in the final.

== Career statistics ==
Belgium score listed first, score column indicates score after each Balyu goal.

List of international goals scored by Félix Balyu
No.	Date	Venue	Opponent	Score	Result	Competition
1	22 April 1916	Stade Chevaleret, Paris, France	(France) FGSPF	1–0	17–0	Journées du Poilu Sportif quarter-finals
2	22 April 1916	Stade Chevaleret, Paris, France	(France) FGSPF	2–0	17–0	Journées du Poilu Sportif quarter-finals
3	22 April 1916	Stade Chevaleret, Paris, France	(France) FGSPF	3–0	17–0	Journées du Poilu Sportif quarter-finals
4	22 April 1916	Stade Chevaleret, Paris, France	(France) FGSPF	4–0	17–0	Journées du Poilu Sportif quarter-finals
5	23 April 1916	Pavillon des Princes, Boulogne, France	(France) LFA	3–0	4–0	Journées du Poilu Sportif semifinals
6	23 April 1916	Pavillon des Princes, Boulogne, France	(France) LFA	4–0	4–0	Journées du Poilu Sportif semifinals
7	24 April 1916	Stade de Paris, Saint-Ouen, France	(France) USFSA	1–1	3–1	Journées du Poilu Sportif final
8	24 April 1916	Stade de Paris, Saint-Ouen, France	(France) USFSA	3–1	3–1	Journées du Poilu Sportif final

== Honours ==
Club Brugge

- Belgian Pro League: 1919–20
- Belgian Cup runner-up: 1914

Belgium

- Journées du Poilu Sportif 1916
- Summer Olympics gold medal: 1920

Individual

- Journées du Poilu Sportif top goalscorer: 1916 (at least 8 goals)
