= ANVV De Zwaluwen =

Association football team of Netherlands

De Zwaluwen
- Confederation: None

Biggest win
- Zwaluwen 6–2 Corinthians FC (England) (Haarlem, Netherlands; 5 September 1933)

Biggest defeat
- Belgium 5–0 Zwaluwen (Netherlands) (Brussels, Belgium; 4 March 1930)

The General Dutch Football Association De Zwaluwen (Dutch: Algemene Nederlandse Voetbalvereniging De Zwaluwen, ANVV De Zwaluwen) was a football organization founded on 17 July 1907 with the main goal of improving the level of football in the Netherlands. Later historians ascribe this entity as "a sort of Dutch National Team before 1930 that also represented sometimes the national team", and which would be considered a B team by today's standards.

The Zwaluwen football team plays one-off games against local or foreign clubs, regional teams, or collectives of other confederations, and as such, no governing body in the sport officially recognizes the team. The selection was especially important before the 1940s, serving as a springboard for possible selection in the Dutch national team.

== History ==
The ANVV De Zwaluwen was founded on 17 July 1907, and its first board of directors consisted of Cornelis Hirschman, Jan van den Berg, Cees van Hasselt, N. G. Jannink, and Bill Dijxhoorn, who were all members of the committee of the Dutch national team. During the 1910s and 1920s, this Zwaluwen team served as a springboard for possible selection in the Dutch national team and often held the middle ground between the U21 side and the Dutch B team, although on occasion, they also field a near complete A team. There were also a few occasions where a club team played under the name De Zwaluwen, such as VV Zwaluwen founded in 1935. De Zwaluwen employed professional trainers who were also (part-time) stationed at clubs, such as the one-time national coach John Bollington.

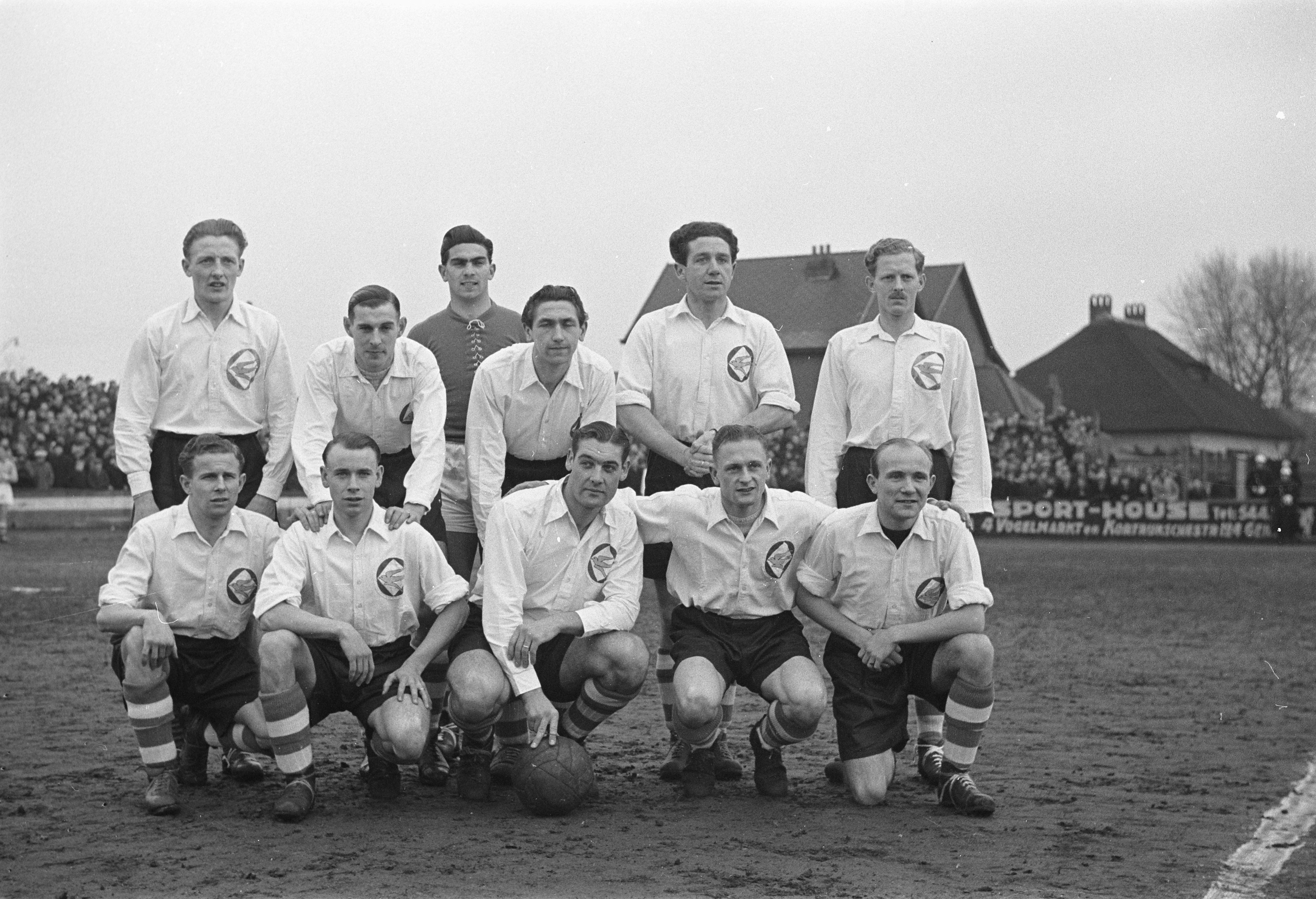
De Zwaluwen team in 1948.

The first-ever goal in the history of De Zwaluwen was scored by Edu Snethlage on 21 November 1907 at the HVV stadium in a match between two Zwaluwen test teams, and two years later, on 23 May 1909, Snethlage played for the last time in Zwaluwenverband in Amsterdam on the grounds of RAP against the Bolton Wanderers. During its first years, De Zwaluwen regularly played against the Dutch national team, but after the First World War, they began playing annual matches against the so-called Red Devils, the Belgian equivalent of De Zwaluwen, on Mardi Gras in Brussels. On 5 September 1933, De Zwaluwen achieved its biggest-ever winning margin following a 6–2 victory over Corinthians FC in Haarlem.

De Zwaluwen only ceased to exist in the 1960s.

== Results ==
In the 20th century, Zwaluwen played several matches against Belgium and British clubs.

=== 1900s ===
| 23 May 1909 International friendly | "Zwaluwen" (Netherlands) | 0–6 | (England) Bolton Wanderers | Den Haag, Netherlands |
| | | | | Stadium: HVV site |

=== 1920s ===
| 8 February 1921 International Friendly | Belgium | 2 – 0 | (Netherlands) "Zwaluwen" | Brussels, Belgium |
| 14:37 UTC+1 | Bragard 23'; Thijs 90' | | | Stadium: Park Duden; Attendance: 10,000; Referee: Charles Barette (Belgium) |

| 1 March 1922 International Friendly | Belgium | 2 – 2 | (Netherlands) "Zwaluwen" | Brussels, Belgium |
| | Larnoe 56'; Hendrickx 74' | | Blinckhof 23'; Petit 45' | Stadium: Park Duden; Attendance: 12,000; Referee: John Langenus |

| 13 February 1923 International Friendly | Belgium | 5 – 3 | (Netherlands) "Zwaluwen" | Brussels, Belgium |
| 14:32 UTC+1 | Larnoe 21'; Musch 54'; Vandevelde 55'; Wertz 68'; Gillis 75' | | van Linge 19'; Buitenweg ?'; Formenoij ?' | Stadium: Park Duden; Attendance: 12,000; Referee: Christophe |

| 1927 or 1928 International Friendly | Belgium | 1 – 3 | (Netherlands) Zwaluwen | Belgium |

| 12 February 1929 International Friendly | Zwaluwen (Netherlands) | 1 – 0 | Belgium | Amsterdam, Netherlands |

=== 1930s ===
| 4 March 1930 International Friendly | Belgium | 5 – 0 | (Netherlands) "Zwaluwen" | Brussels, Belgium |
| | Vanderbauwhede 37', 64'; Adams 56' (pen.), 72', 85' | | | Attendance: 18,000; Referee: Charlier |

| 29 May 1930 International Friendly | "Zwaluwen" (Netherlands) | 3 – 3 | Belgium | Rotterdam, Netherlands |
| | Wendt 12'; Lagendaal ?'; Everdingen 83' | | Stijnen ?'; Van Beeck 78'; Devidts 86' | Stadium: Sparta Stadion; Attendance: 20,000 |

| 20 November 1930 International friendly | "Zwaluwen" (Netherlands) | 2–4 | (England) Bristol Rovers | Den Haag, Netherlands |
| | | Report |

| 17 February 1931 International Friendly | Belgium | 3 – 1 | (Netherlands) "Zwaluwen" | Belgium |
| | Voorhoof 30', ?'; Capelle 35' | | Volkers ?' | Referee: Hamus (Luxembourg) |

| 1 May 1931 International friendly | "Zwaluwen" (Netherlands) | 0–2 | (England) Port Vale | Den Haag, Netherlands |
| | | Report |

| 5 September 1933 International friendly | "Zwaluwen" (Netherlands) | 6–2 | (England) Corinthians FC | Haarlem, Netherlands |
| | | Report |

| 7 February 1934 International Friendly | Belgium | 6 – 3 | (Netherlands) "Zwaluwen" | Brussels, Belgium |
| | | | | Stadium: Heysel Stadion; Attendance: 3,000; Referee: Turfkruyer |

| 18 April 1934 International friendly | "Zwaluwen" (Netherlands) | 1–2 | (England) Stoke City | Amsterdam, Netherlands |
| | | Report |

| 2 June 1935 International friendly | "Zwaluwen" (Netherlands) | 6–5 | (England) Reading | Breda, Netherlands |
| | | Report |

| 28 May 1939 International friendly | "Zwaluwen" (Netherlands) | 3–5 | (England) Everton | Rotterdam, Netherlands |
| | | Report |
