= Maurice Vandendriessche =

French footballer (1887–1959)

Personal information
- Full name: Maurice Auguste Van Den Driessche
- Date of birth: 2 April 1887
- Place of birth: Lille, France
- Date of death: 18 November 1959 (aged 72)
- Place of death: Melbourne, Australia
- Height: 1.72 m (5 ft 8 in)
- Position: Midfielder

Senior career*
Years	Team	Apps	(Gls)
1906–1908	RC Roubaix		
1918	CA Société Générale	1	
1918–1919	RC Roubaix	+1	

International career
1908	France	2	(0)
1915–1917	Belgium (unofficial)	5	(0)
1917	Belgian Front Wanderers	2	(0)
1923	Victoria	1	(0)
- * Club domestic league appearances and goals

Maurice Vandendriessche (2 April 1887 – 18 November 1959) was a French footballer who played as a midfielder for RC Roubaix and the French national team.

== Early life ==
Vandendriessche was born in Lille on 2 April 1887, as the eighth child in a family of eleven, to a Belgian father, a carpenter, and a French mother. Therefore, he had the choice between the two nationalities, but as long as he was still a minor, which at the time was aged 21, he was French by assimilation.

== Club career ==
Vandendriessche began his football career at RC Roubaix, where he climbed all the ranks, going from the fourth team to the third team in 1903 until taking his place in the first team in 1905. He was a member of the team that won the 1906 USFSA Football Championship after beating CA Paris 4–1 in the final on 29 April in Tourcoing. Two years later, he won his second USFSA national title in 1908, this time beating RC de France 2–1 in the final on 3 May.

On 2 April 1908, Vandendriessche turned 21 years of age, thus becoming an adult and opting for Belgian nationality, which was odd since he worked for a French employer (Caulliez) in France, married a French woman in France, and never lived in Belgium. Military service was introduced in Belgium in 1909, and Vandendriessche likely had to attend it because he disappeared from the RC Roubaix squad between 1909 and 1911. He was a wool buyer for the Caulliez establishments and made numerous trips back and forth between the North of France and Australia. For instance, he was reported in Melbourne in 1912, married in Roubaix in 1913, created a French Sports Association (ASF) in Sydney in 1914, and then spent the entire duration of the First World War in France, until 1920. In 1914, he was pre-selected to play a football match between the states of Queensland and New South Wales, but he failed to do so probably because he did not have Australian nationality.

Even though he played his last match for Roubaix in 1908, Vandendriessche remained licensed with the Roubaix club for over a decade. During the War, however, the regulations were relaxed, and in January 1918, he was authorized to sign a temporary license for the Parisian CA Société Générale (CASG), which allowed him to play in the semifinals of the very first Coupe de France in 1917–18, which ended in a 2–1 loss to Olympique de Pantin. When the War was over, he returned to RC Roubaix, where he teamed up in the half-back line with his brother René, who was 4 years younger, and the Vandendriessche brothers played together in September 1919 against US Tourcoing (2–2).

In 1920, he resumed his wanderings and commercial activities in Australia, and in 1923, the 36-year-old Vandendriessche was finally selected for the Victoria team that faced New South Wales, and the newspaper The Referee wrote: "Victoria had a wonderfully good man in M. Vandendriche who played for France before the War in an international match". In 1924, he played in the teams that faced the English professionals on tour in the Antipodes. In November 1925, the French newspaper Le Miroir des sports stated that he was "one of the best footballers in France before the War".

== International career ==
Vandendriessche made his international debut on 8 March 1908, in a friendly match against Switzerland in Geneva, helping his side to a 2–1 win. He earned his second and final international cap for France two weeks later on 23 March, in another away friendly, this time against England amateurs in London, which ended in a resounding 12–0 loss.

In the following month, Vandendriessche was called up for a third match against Belgium, but on 10 April, two days before the match, the French FA learned that he had turned 21 years of age and opted for Belgian nationality, so he was therefore no longer called up to the French team. He was never called up by the Belgian team either, because, at the time, the player not only needed the nationality, but also had to be licensed in a club of that country. He had not presented himself to the review board in 1907, which proves that he had made his decision well before 1908, so several football historians have discussed why France selected a player who was going to change nationality at the beginning of the following month.

During the First World War, he fought in the ranks of the Belgian Army, which had to retreat to the Yser Front in July 1914, and that is when Vandendriessche was seen again on the football pitches in France, but under another name: Vandendey; his name during the War. The reasons behind this pseudonym remain unknown, especially because the newspapers did not hide the fact that Vandendey was in fact Vandendriessche.

In early 1915, Vandendriessche, together with a small group of Belgian players who had retreated to France, formed a committee of the Belgian FA in Paris, which organized one match against France every year; this games and its results are recognized as official by the CFI, but not by FIFA, who categorized them as "War-time Internationals". Although still licensed in Roubaix, and therefore in the CFI, Vandendriessche could play these war matches under the Belgian colours because they were unofficial. In total, he played five matches for this Belgian team, which had some former internationals, such as Emile Hanse, Jan van Cant, or Félix Balyu, taking part in the Belgian victories of 1915 (3–0) and 1916 (4–1), and also in their triumphant campaign at the Journées du Poilu Sportif in 1916, which Belgium won after beating Union (USFSA) 3–1 in the final. He was also a member of the Belgian Front Wanderers, the team that toured England in 1917, where they played against the British and Canadian army on 25 and 28 November.

== Playing style ==
Vandendriessche practiced athletics in the summers, specializing in the 110 metres hurdles, and his speed allowed him to excel at the wings. He was described by the reports of the time as "energetic, fast, and skillful", and the chronicles of the time specify several times how he rarely missed a ball, which was precious back in a time when ball control, or the precision of passes, even short ones, were not taken for granted.

== Later life ==
His name is so complicated for the Australians that they call him "Vandle", who attempted to set up a tour of Europe for the Australians, and even tried to convince them to participate in the 1930 FIFA World Cup, but Australia did not succeed in creating a federation uniting its different states (Australia has 6, plus Tasmania), and was not affiliated to FIFA.

== Death ==
Vandendriessche died in Melbourne, Australia, on 18 November 1959, at the age of 72.

== Honours ==
RC Roubaix

- USFSA Football Championship: 1906, 1908

Belgium

- Journées du Poilu Sportif: 1916
