= Belgium national football team results =

List of results of the Belgium national football team

This article summarizes the outcomes of all official matches played by the Belgium national football team by opponent and by decade, since they first played in official competitions in 1904.

== Record per opponent ==
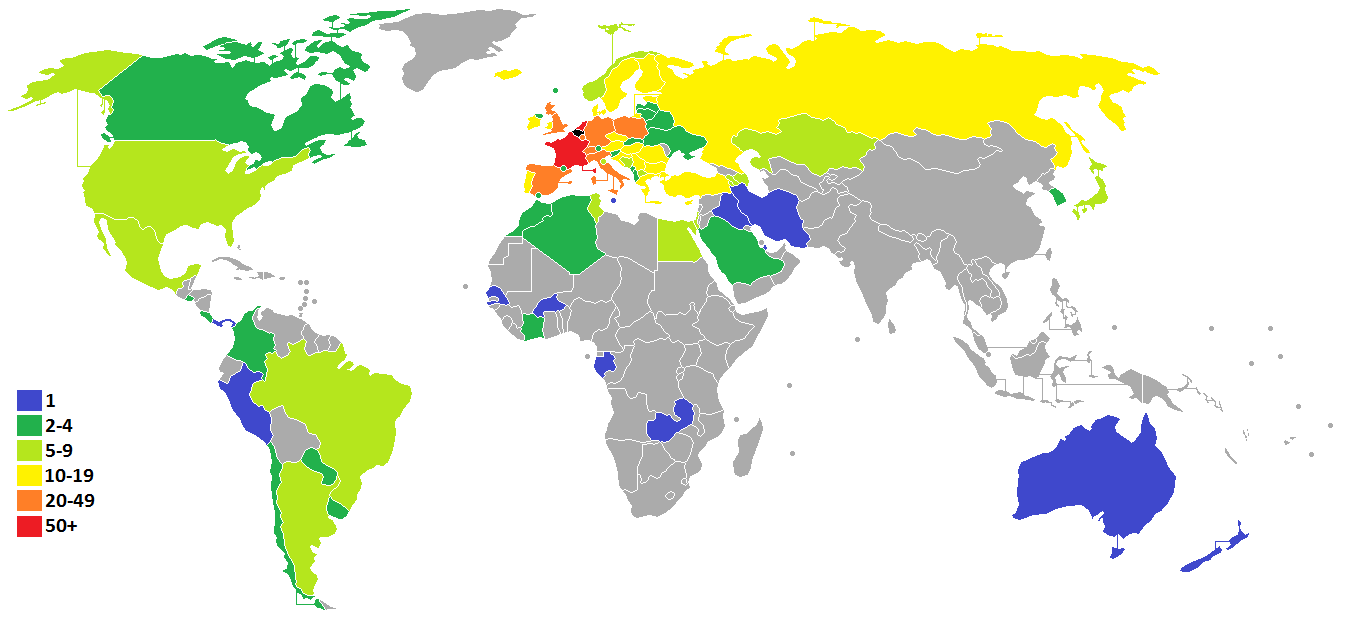
Match frequency of Belgium against opponents worldwide (31 March 2021)

The following table shows Belgium's all-time international record per opponent. It excludes any unofficial matches.

Note: countries considered as a continuity by the FIFA are put in italics. Their statistics are in fact composed of multiple countries that are also included separately.

Last updated: France vs. Belgium, 5 October 2026. Statistics include official FIFA-recognised matches only. (Note: Note that the friendlies against Romania on 14 November 2012 and against Luxembourg on 26 May 2014 are not FIFA-recognised due to an excessive number of substitutions according to the Laws of the Game. The Belgian and Czech football federations were too late in asking that the match against Czech Republic on 5 June 2017 would be official.)

Opponent	Pld	W	D*	L	GF	GA	GD	W%	PPG (Note: According to the "three points for a win" standard)	Confederation
Albania	2	1	0	1	3	3	0	50	1.5	UEFA
Algeria	3	2	1	0	5	2	+3	66.67	2.33	CAF
Andorra	4	4	0	0	14	1	+13	100	3	UEFA
Argentina	5	1	0	4	4	11	–7	16.67	0.5	CONMEBOL
Armenia	6	5	0	1	11	2	+8	83.33	2.5	UEFA
Australia	1	1	0	0	2	0	+2	100	3	AFC
Austria	16	3	4	9	22	44	–22	18.75	0.81	UEFA
Azerbaijan	6	5	1	0	15	2	+13	83.33	2.67	UEFA
Belarus	2	2	0	0	8	0	+8	100	3	UEFA
Bosnia and Herzegovina	8	4	1	3	19	13	+6	50	1.63	UEFA
Brazil	5	2	0	3	8	11	–3	40	1.2	CONMEBOL
Bulgaria	14	6	2	6	23	20	+3	42.86	1.43	UEFA
Burkina Faso	1	1	0	0	3	0	+3	100	3	CAF
Canada	2	2	0	0	3	0	+3	100	3	CONCACAF
Chile	2	0	2	0	2	2	0	0	1	CONMEBOL
Colombia	2	1	0	1	2	2	0	50	1.5	CONMEBOL
Costa Rica	2	2	0	0	5	1	+4	100	3	CONCACAF
Croatia	11	5	3	3	7	9	–2	45.45	1.36	UEFA
Cyprus	13	12	1	0	34	4	+30	92.31	2.85	UEFA
Czech Republic	9	4	2	3	7	9	–2	44.44	1.56	UEFA
Czechoslovakia	10	3	2	5	13	20	–7	30	1.1	UEFA
Czech Republic + Czechoslovakia	19	7	4	8	20	29	–9	36.84	1.32	UEFA
Denmark	16	7	3	6	27	25	+2	43.75	1.5	UEFA
East Germany	8	3	2	3	8	7	+1	37.5	1.38	UEFA
Egypt	5	1	1	3	5	8	–3	20	0.8	CAF
El Salvador	2	2	0	0	4	0	+4	100	3	CONCACAF
England	27	5	6*	15	35	73	–38	18.52	0.78	UEFA
England Amateurs	10	2	1	7	14	42	–28	20	0.7	–
Estonia	10	9	0	1	24	5	+19	90	2.7	UEFA
Faroe Islands	2	2	0	0	6	0	+6	100	3	UEFA
Finland	11	4	4	4	20	19	+1	27.27	1.18	UEFA
France	80	30	19	31	162	138	+24	37.5	1.36	UEFA
Gabon	1	1	0	0	2	1	+1	100	3	CAF
Germany (<1950 & >1990)	17	4	0	13	23	45	–13	23.53	0.71	UEFA
Germany + West Germany	25	4	1	20	26	58	–32	16	0.52	UEFA
Gibraltar	2	2	0	0	15	0	+15	100	3	UEFA
Greece	9	4	4	3	10	9	+1	33.33	1.33	UEFA
Hungary	13	9	2	2	31	16	+15	69.23	2.23	UEFA
Iceland	13	13	0	0	44	8	+36	100	3	UEFA
Iran	1	0	1	0	0	0	0	0	1	AFC
Iraq	1	1	0	0	2	1	+1	100	3	AFC
Republic of Ireland	16	6	6	4	28	24	+4	37.5	1.5	UEFA
Israel	9	7	0	2	18	6	+12	77.78	2	UEFA
Italy	26	5	5	16	28	46	–18	19.23	0.77	UEFA
Ivory Coast	1	0	1	0	2	2	0	0	1	CAF
Japan	6	2	2	2	8	11	–3	33.33	1.33	AFC
Kazakhstan	8	5	3	0	20	4	+16	62.5	2.25	UEFA
Latvia	2	2	0	0	7	1	+6	100	3	UEFA
Liechtenstein	2	2	0	0	13	0	+13	100	3	UEFA
Lithuania	2	0	2	0	2	2	0	0	1	UEFA
Luxembourg	19	15	3	1	60	11	+49	78.95	2.53	UEFA
North Macedonia	6	3	3	0	10	2	+8	50	2	UEFA
Malta	1	0	0	1	0	1	–1	0	0	UEFA
Mexico	8	2	3	3	12	10	+2	25	1.13	CONCACAF
Montenegro	1	1	0	0	2	0	0	100	3	UEFA
Morocco	4	2	0	2	6	6	0	50	1.5	CAF
Netherlands	129	41	31	57	220	281	–61	31.78	1.19	UEFA
New Zealand	1	1	0	0	5	1	+4	100	3	UEFA
Northern Ireland	3	1	0	2	2	6	–4	33.33	1	UEFA
Norway	9	6	3	0	17	8	+9	66.67	2.33	UEFA
Panama	1	1	0	0	3	0	+3	100	3	CONCACAF
Paraguay	3	1	1	1	3	3	0	33.33	1.33	CONMEBOL
Peru	1	0	1	0	1	1	0	0	1	CONMEBOL
Poland	21	8	6	7	20	26	–6	38.1	1.43	UEFA
Portugal	19	6	7	6	22	21	+1	31.58	1.32	UEFA
Qatar	1	1	0	0	2	0	+2	100	3	AFC
Romania	12	6	2	4	17	12	+5	50	1.67	UEFA
Russia	7	5	2	0	16	7	+9	71.43	2.43	UEFA
Russia + CIS + Soviet Union	12	6	2	4	21	17	+4	50	1.67	UEFA
San Marino	8	8	0	0	46	3	+43	100	3	UEFA
Saudi Arabia	3	2	0	1	6	2	+4	66.67	2	AFC
Scotland	20	13	3	4	39	21	+18	65	2.1	UEFA
Senegal	1	1	0	0	3	2	+1	100	0.15	CAF
Serbia	5	4	0	1	9	4	+5	80	2.4	UEFA
Serbia (and Montenegro) + Yugoslavia	18	8	3	7	26	23	+3	44.44	1.5	UEFA
Serbia and Montenegro	2	0	1	1	0	2	–2	0	0.5	UEFA
South Korea	4	3	1	0	6	2	+4	75	2.5	AFC
Soviet Union	5	1	0	4	5	10	–5	20	0.6	UEFA
Slovakia	4	1	2	1	4	4	0	25	1.25	UEFA
Czechoslovakia	10	3	2	5	13	20	–7	30	1.1	UEFA
Slovakia + Czechoslovakia	14	4	4	6	17	24	–7	28.57	1.14	UEFA
Slovenia	2	1	1	0	2	0	+2	50	2	UEFA
Spain	24	5	6*	13	23	48	–25	20.83	0.88	UEFA
Sweden	16	9	2	5	26	30	–4	56.25	1.81	UEFA
Switzerland	30	15	6	9	57	45	+12	50	1.7	UEFA
Tunisia	5	3	1	1	13	5	+8	60	2	CAF
Turkey	12	4	5	3	21	17	+4	33.33	1.17	UEFA
Ukraine	3	1	1	1	4	3	+1	33.33	1.33	UEFA
United States	8	7	0	1	19	9	+10	87.5	2.63	CONCACAF
Uruguay	2	2	0	0	5	1	+4	100	3	CONMEBOL
Wales	18	8	5	5	27	26	+1	44.44	1.81	UEFA
West Germany	9	1	1	7	6	15	–9	11.11	0.44	UEFA
Yugoslavia	11	4	2	5	15	17	–2	36.36	1.27	UEFA
Zambia	1	1	0	0	9	0	+9	100	3	CAF
Totals	837	367	177	293	1507	1234	+203	43.85	1.53	–
* Draws include knockout matches decided on penalty kicks.

== Results in chronological order ==
The summarizing tables below show Belgium's official matches per decade. More extensive reports (with dates, scores, goal scorers and match circumstances) can be found on the main articles per decade. This detailed information is currently available only for the 1900s, 1910s, and 1980s onward.

	Legend for encounters
S.O.	Summer Olympics
W.C.	FIFA World Cup
EURO	UEFA European Football Championship
CC	Confederations Cup
TB	Tie-break match
Q	Qualification rounds
R + number	Round number
FR	Final Round
GS	Group Stage
1/16	Round of 32
1/8	Round of 16
QF	Quarter-final
SF	Semi-final
F	Final
RP	Repechage
Rep.	Replay match
3rd-4th	Third place match

=== 1904–1919 ===
47 matches played:

1904–1909
Win Draw Defeat
M	Date	Opponent	Result	Event
1	1904-05-01	France	3–3	Évence Coppée Trophy
2	1905-04-30	Netherlands	1–4	Friendly
3	1905-05-07	France	7–0	Friendly
4	1905-05-14	Netherlands	4–0	Friendly
5	1906-04-22	France	0–5	Friendly
6	1906-04-29	Netherlands	5–0	Friendly
7	1906-05-13	Netherlands	2–3	Friendly
8	1907-04-14	Netherlands	1–3	Friendly
9	1907-04-21	France	1–2	Friendly
10	1907-05-09	Netherlands	1–2	Friendly
11	1908-03-29	Netherlands	1–4	Friendly
12	1908-04-12	France	1–2	Friendly
13	1908-04-18	England amateurs	2–8	Friendly
14	1908-04-26	Netherlands	3–1	Friendly
15	1908-10-26	Sweden	2–1	Friendly
16	1909-03-21	Netherlands	1–4	Friendly
17	1909-04-17	England amateurs	11–2	Friendly
18	1909-04-25	Netherlands	4–1	Friendly
19	1909-05-09	France	5–2	Friendly
20	1910-03-13	Netherlands	3–2	Friendly
21	1910-03-26	England amateurs	2–2	Friendly
22	1910-04-03	France	0–4	Friendly
23	1910-04-10	Netherlands	7–0	Friendly
24	1910-05-16	Germany	0–3	Friendly
25	1911-03-04	England amateurs	4–0	Friendly
26	1911-03-19	Netherlands	1–5	Friendly
27	1911-04-02	Netherlands	3–1	Friendly
28	1911-04-23	Germany	2–1	Friendly
29	1911-04-30	France	7–1	Friendly
30	1912-01-28	France	1–1	Friendly
31	1912-02-20	Switzerland	9–2	Friendly
32	1912-03-10	Netherlands	1–2	Friendly
33	1912-04-08	England amateurs	1–2	Friendly
34	1912-04-28	Netherlands	4–3	Friendly
35	1912-11-09	England amateurs	4–0	Friendly
36	1913-02-16	France	3–0	Friendly
37	1913-03-09	Netherlands	3–3	Friendly
38	1913-04-20	Netherlands	2–4	Friendly
39	1913-05-01	Italy	1–0	Friendly
40	1913-05-04	Switzerland	1–2	Friendly
41	1913-11-02	Switzerland	2–0	Friendly
42	1913-11-23	Germany	6–2	Friendly
43	1914-01-25	France	4–3	Friendly
44	1914-02-24	England amateurs	1–8	Friendly
45	1914-03-15	Netherlands	2–4	Friendly
46	1914-04-26	Netherlands	4–2	Friendly
47	1919-03-09	France	2–2	Friendly

=== 1920–1929 ===
61 matches played:

1920–1929
Win Draw Defeat
M	Date	Opponent	Result	Event
48	1920-02-17	England amateurs	3–1	Friendly
49	1920-03-28	France	2–1	Friendly
50	1920-08-29	Spain	3–1	(Belgium) 1920 S.O.
51	1920-08-31	Netherlands	3–0	(Belgium) 1920 S.O.
52	1920-09-02	Czechoslovakia	2–0	(Belgium) 1920 S.O.
53	1921-03-06	France	3–1	Friendly
54	1921-05-05	Italy	2–3	Friendly
55	1921-05-15	Netherlands	1–1	Friendly
56	1921-05-21	England	0–2	Friendly
57	1921-10-09	Spain	2–0	Friendly
58	1922-01-15	France	2–1	Friendly
59	1922-03-26	Netherlands	4–0	Friendly
60	1922-04-15	Denmark	0–0	Friendly
61	1922-05-07	Netherlands	1–2	Friendly
62	1922-05-21	Italy	4–2	Friendly
63	1923-02-04	Spain	1–0	Friendly
64	1923-02-25	France	4–1	Friendly
65	1923-03-19	England	6–1	Friendly
66	1923-04-29	Netherlands	1–1	Friendly
67	1923-05-05	England	3–0	Friendly
68	1923-11-01	England	2–2	Friendly
69	1924-01-13	France	2–0	Friendly
70	1924-03-23	Netherlands	1–1	Friendly
71	1924-04-27	Netherlands	1–1	Friendly
72	1924-05-29	Sweden	1–8	(France) 1924 S.O.
73	1924-10-05	Denmark	2–1	Friendly
74	1924-11-11	France	3–0	Friendly
75	1924-12-08	England	4–0	Friendly
76	1925-03-15	Netherlands	0–1	Friendly
77	1925-05-03	Netherlands	5–0	Friendly
78	1925-05-21	Hungary	1–3	Friendly
79	1925-05-24	Switzerland	0–0	Friendly
80	1925-12-13	Austria	3–4	Friendly
81	1926-02-14	Hungary	0–2	Friendly
82	1926-03-14	Netherlands	1–1	Friendly
83	1926-04-11	France	4–3	Friendly
84	1926-05-02	Netherlands	1–5	Friendly
85	1926-05-24	England	3–5	Friendly
86	1926-06-20	France	2–2	Friendly
87	1927-01-02	Czechoslovakia	2–3	Friendly
88	1927-03-13	Netherlands	2–0	Friendly
89	1927-04-03	Sweden	2–1	Friendly
90	1927-05-01	Netherlands	3–2	Friendly
91	1927-05-01	England	1–9	Friendly
92	1927-05-22	Austria	4–1	Friendly
93	1927-06-26	Czechoslovakia	4–0	Friendly
94	1927-09-04	Sweden	7–0	Friendly
95	1928-01-08	Austria	1–2	Friendly
96	1928-02-12	Ireland	2–4	Friendly
97	1928-03-11	Netherlands	1–1	Friendly
98	1928-04-01	Netherlands	1–0	Friendly
99	1928-04-15	France	2–3	Friendly
100	1928-05-19	England	1–3	Friendly
101	1928-05-27	Luxembourg	5–3	(Netherlands) 1928 S.O.
102	1928-06-02	Argentina	3–6	(Netherlands) 1928 S.O.
103	1928-06-05	Netherlands	3–1	(Netherlands) 1928 S.O.
104	1928-11-04	Netherlands	1–1	Friendly
105	1929-04-20	Irish Free State	4–0	Friendly
106	1929-05-05	Netherlands	3–1	Friendly
107	1929-05-11	England	1–5	Friendly
108	1929-05-26	France	4–1	Friendly

=== 1930–1939 ===
70 matches played:

1930–1939
Win Draw Defeat
M	Opponent	Result	Event
109	France	W	Friendly
110	Netherlands	D	Friendly
111	Ireland	L	Friendly
112	Netherlands	W	Friendly
113	France	L	Friendly
114	Portugal	W	Friendly
115	United States	L	(Uruguay) 1930 W.C.
116	Paraguay	L	(Uruguay) 1930 W.C.
117	Czechoslovakia	L	Friendly
118	Sweden	D	Friendly
119	France	D	Friendly
120	Netherlands	L	Friendly
121	Netherlands	W	Friendly
122	England	L	Friendly
123	Portugal	L	Friendly
124	Poland	W	Friendly
125	Switzerland	W	Friendly
126	Netherlands	L	Friendly
127	Netherlands	L	Friendly
128	France	W	Friendly
129	Denmark	W	Friendly
130	Sweden	L	Friendly
131	Austria	L	Friendly
132	Italy	L	Friendly
133	Switzerland	D	Friendly
134	France	L	Friendly
135	Netherlands	L	Friendly
136	Netherlands	W	Friendly
137	Poland	W	Friendly
138	Austria	L	Friendly
139	Germany	L	Friendly
140	Denmark	D	Friendly
141	France	L	Friendly
142	Irish Free State	D	(Italy) 1934 W.C. Q
143	Netherlands	L	Friendly
144	Netherlands	L	(Italy) 1934 W.C. Q
145	Germany	L	(Italy) 1934 W.C.
146	Netherlands	L	Friendly
147	France	D	Friendly
148	Germany	L	Friendly
149	Netherlands	L	Friendly
150	Switzerland	D	Friendly
151	Sweden	W	Friendly
152	Poland	L	Friendly
153	France	L	Friendly
154	Netherlands	L	Friendly
155	Netherlands	D	Friendly
156	England	W	Friendly
157	Switzerland	D	Friendly
158	France	W	Friendly
159	Netherlands	W	Friendly
160	Switzerland	L	Friendly
161	Germany	L	Friendly
162	Netherlands	L	Friendly
163	(Kingdom of Yugoslavia) Yugoslavia	D	Friendly
164	Romania	L	Friendly
165	France	L	Friendly
166	Netherlands	L	Friendly
167	Luxembourg	W	(France) 1938 W.C. Q
168	Netherlands	D	(France) 1938 W.C. Q
169	Switzerland	W	Friendly
170	Italy	L	Friendly
171	(Kingdom of Yugoslavia) Yugoslavia	D	Friendly
172	France	L	(France) 1938 W.C.
173	Germany	L	Friendly
174	Netherlands	W	Friendly
175	Netherlands	L	Friendly
176	Switzerland	L	Friendly
177	France	L	Friendly
178	Poland	D	Friendly

=== 1940–1949 ===
29 matches played:

1940-1949
Win Draw Defeat
M	Opponent	Result	Event
179	Netherlands	W	Friendly
180	Netherlands	L	Friendly
181	France	L	Friendly
182	Luxembourg	L	Friendly
183	France	W	Friendly
184	England	L	Friendly
185	Scotland	D	Friendly
186	Luxembourg	W	Friendly
187	Netherlands	L	Friendly
188	Netherlands	D	Friendly
189	Netherlands	L	Friendly
190	Netherlands	L	Friendly
191	Scotland	W	Friendly
192	France	L	Friendly
193	England	D	Friendly
194	Switzerland	L	Friendly
195	Netherlands	D	Friendly
196	Netherlands	D	Friendly
197	Scotland	L	Friendly
198	France	W	Friendly
199	France	D	Friendly
200	Netherlands	D	Friendly
201	Spain	D	Friendly
202	Netherlands	D	Friendly
203	Ireland	W	Friendly
204	Wales	W	Friendly
205	Switzerland	W	Friendly
206	Netherlands	W	Friendly
207	Wales	L	Friendly

=== 1950–1959 ===
70 matches played:

1950–1959
Win Draw Defeat
M	Opponent	Result	Event
208	Italy	L	Friendly
209	Netherlands	W	Friendly
210	Republic of Ireland	W	Friendly
211	England	L	Friendly
212	France	W	Friendly
213	France	D	Friendly
214	Netherlands	W	Friendly
215	Netherlands	L	Friendly
216	Scotland	L	Friendly
217	Spain	D	Friendly
218	Portugal	D	Friendly
219	Austria	L	Friendly
220	Netherlands	W	Friendly
221	Italy	W	Friendly
222	Austria	L	Friendly
223	Netherlands	W	Friendly
224	France	L	Friendly
225	Netherlands	W	Friendly
226	England	L	Friendly
227	France	W	Friendly
228	Spain	L	Friendly
229	Netherlands	W	Friendly
230	Yugoslavia	L	Friendly
231	Finland	W	(Switzerland) 1954 W.C. Q
232	Sweden	W	(Switzerland) 1954 W.C. Q
233	Finland	D	(Switzerland) 1954 W.C. Q
234	Sweden	W	(Switzerland) 1954 W.C. Q
235	Netherlands	L	Friendly
236	Switzerland	D	Friendly
237	Portugal	D	Friendly
238	Netherlands	W	Friendly
239	Yugoslavia	W	Friendly
240	France	W	Friendly
241	England	D	(Switzerland) 1954 W.C.
242	Italy	L	(Switzerland) 1954 W.C.
243	West Germany	W	Friendly
244	Netherlands	W	Friendly
245	France	D	Friendly
246	Italy	L	Friendly
247	Netherlands	L	Friendly
248	Czechoslovakia	L	Friendly
249	Czechoslovakia	L	Friendly
250	Romania	L	Friendly
251	Netherlands	D	Friendly
252	France	W	Friendly
253	Switzerland	L	Friendly
254	Netherlands	L	Friendly
255	Hungary	W	Friendly
256	Netherlands	L	Friendly
257	France	L	(Sweden) 1958 W.C. Q
258	West Germany	L	Friendly
259	Spain	L	Friendly
260	Netherlands	D	Friendly
261	Romania	W	Friendly
262	Iceland	W	(Sweden) 1958 W.C. Q
263	Iceland	W	(Sweden) 1958 W.C. Q
264	France	D	(Sweden) 1958 W.C. Q
265	Netherlands	L	Friendly
266	Turkey	D	Friendly
267	West Germany	L	Friendly
268	Netherlands	L	Friendly
269	Switzerland	W	Friendly
270	Netherlands	L	Friendly
271	Turkey	D	Friendly
272	Hungary	L	Friendly
273	France	D	Friendly
274	Netherlands	D	Friendly
275	Austria	L	Friendly
276	Austria	L	Friendly
277	Netherlands	L	Friendly

=== 1960–1969 ===
68 matches played:

1960–1969
Win Draw Defeat
M	Opponent	Result	Event
278	France	W	Friendly
279	Switzerland	W	Friendly
280	Chile	D	Friendly
281	Netherlands	W	Friendly
282	Bulgaria	L	Friendly
283	Netherlands	L	Friendly
284	Sweden	L	(Chile) 1962 W.C. Q
285	Hungary	W	Friendly
286	Switzerland	L	(Chile) 1962 W.C. Q
287	West Germany	L	Friendly
288	France	D	Friendly
289	Netherlands	L	Friendly
290	Switzerland	L	(Chile) 1962 W.C. Q
291	Sweden	L	(Chile) 1962 W.C. Q
292	France	W	Friendly
293	Netherlands	W	Friendly
294	Bulgaria	W	Friendly
295	Netherlands	W	Friendly
296	Italy	L	Friendly
297	Portugal	W	Friendly
298	Poland	L	Friendly
299	Netherlands	W	Friendly
300	Yugoslavia	L	(Spain) 1964 EURO Q
301	Spain	D	Friendly
302	Netherlands	W	Friendly
303	Yugoslavia	L	(Spain) 1964 EURO Q
304	Brazil	W	Friendly
305	Netherlands	D	Friendly
306	Spain	W	Friendly
307	France	W	Friendly
308	Netherlands	D	Friendly
309	Switzerland	L	Friendly
310	Portugal	L	Friendly
311	Netherlands	W	Friendly
312	England	D	Friendly
313	France	W	Friendly
314	Republic of Ireland	W	Friendly
315	Poland	D	Friendly
316	Israel	W	(England) 1966 W.C. Q
317	Brazil	L	Friendly
318	Bulgaria	L	(England) 1966 W.C. Q
319	Bulgaria	W	(England) 1966 W.C. Q
320	Israel	W	(England) 1966 W.C. Q
321	Bulgaria	L	(England) 1966 W.C. Q TB
322	Netherlands	L	Friendly
323	France	W	Friendly
324	Soviet Union	L	Friendly
325	Republic of Ireland	L	Friendly
326	Switzerland	W	Friendly
327	France	W	(Italy) 1968 EURO Q
328	Luxembourg	W	(Italy) 1968 EURO Q
329	Netherlands	W	Friendly
330	Poland	L	(Italy) 1968 EURO Q
331	Poland	L	(Italy) 1968 EURO Q
332	France	D	(Italy) 1968 EURO Q
333	Luxembourg	W	(Italy) 1968 EURO Q
334	Israel	W	Friendly
335	West Germany	L	Friendly
336	Netherlands	W	Friendly
337	Soviet Union	L	Friendly
338	Finland	W	(Mexico) 1970 W.C. Q
339	Finland	W	(Mexico) 1970 W.C. Q
340	Yugoslavia	W	(Mexico) 1970 W.C. Q
341	Spain	D	(Mexico) 1970 W.C. Q
342	Spain	W	(Mexico) 1970 W.C. Q
343	Mexico	W	Friendly
344	Yugoslavia	L	(Mexico) 1970 W.C. Q
345	Mexico	L	Friendly

=== 1970–1979 ===
57 matches played:

1970–1979
Win Draw Defeat
M	Date	Opponent	Result	Event
346	1970-02-25	England	1–3	Friendly
347	1970-06-03	El Salvador	0–3	(Mexico) 1970 W.C.
348	1970-06-06	Soviet Union	1–4	(Mexico) 1970 W.C.
349	1970-06-11	Mexico	1–0	(Mexico) 1970 W.C.
350	1970-11-15	France	1–2	Friendly
351	1970-11-25	Denmark	2–0	(Belgium) 1972 EURO Q
352	1971-02-03	Scotland	3–0	(Belgium) 1972 EURO Q
353	1971-02-17	Portugal	3–0	(Belgium) 1972 EURO Q
354	1971-05-20	Luxembourg	0–4	Friendly
355	1971-05-26	Denmark	1–2	(Belgium) 1972 EURO Q
356	1971-11-07	Luxembourg	1–0	Friendly
357	1971-11-10	Scotland	1–0	(Belgium) 1972 EURO Q
358	1971-11-21	Portugal	1–1	(Belgium) 1972 EURO Q
359	1972-04-29	Italy	0–0	(Belgium) 1972 EURO Q
360	1972-05-13	Italy	2–1	(Belgium) 1972 EURO Q
361	1972-05-18	Iceland	4–0	(West Germany) 1974 W.C. Q
362	1972-05-22	Iceland	4–0	(West Germany) 1974 W.C. Q
363	1972-06-14	West Germany	1–2	(Belgium) 1972 EURO
364	1972-06-17	Hungary	2–1	(Belgium) 1972 EURO
365	1972-10-04	Norway	0–2	(West Germany) 1974 W.C. Q
366	1972-11-19	Netherlands	0–0	(West Germany) 1974 W.C. Q
367	1973-04-18	East Germany	3–0	Friendly
368	1973-10-31	Norway	2–0	(West Germany) 1974 W.C. Q
369	1973-11-18	Netherlands	0–0	(West Germany) 1974 W.C. Q
370	1974-03-13	East Germany	1–0	Friendly
371	1974-04-17	Poland	1–1	Friendly
372	1974-05-01	Switzerland	0–1	Friendly
373	1974-06-01	Scotland	2–1	Friendly
374	1974-09-08	Iceland	0–2	(Socialist Federal Republic of Yugoslavia) 1976 EURO Q
375	1974-10-12	France	2–1	(Socialist Federal Republic of Yugoslavia) 1976 EURO Q
376	1974-12-07	East Germany	0–0	(Socialist Federal Republic of Yugoslavia) 1976 EURO Q
377	1975-04-30	Netherlands	1–0	Friendly
378	1975-09-06	Iceland	1–0	(Socialist Federal Republic of Yugoslavia) 1976 EURO Q
379	1975-09-27	East Germany	1–2	(Socialist Federal Republic of Yugoslavia) 1976 EURO Q
380	1975-11-15	France	0–0	(Socialist Federal Republic of Yugoslavia) 1976 EURO Q
381	1976-04-25	Netherlands	5–0	(Socialist Federal Republic of Yugoslavia) 1976 EURO Q
382	1976-05-22	Netherlands	1–2	(Socialist Federal Republic of Yugoslavia) 1976 EURO Q
383	1976-09-05	Iceland	0–1	(Argentina) 1978 W.C. Q
384	1976-11-10	Northern Ireland	2–0	(Argentina) 1978 W.C. Q
385	1977-01-26	Italy	2–1	Friendly
386	1977-03-26	Netherlands	0–2	(Argentina) 1978 W.C. Q
387	1977-09-03	Iceland	4–0	(Argentina) 1978 W.C. Q
388	1977-10-26	Netherlands	1–0	(Argentina) 1978 W.C. Q
389	1977-11-16	Northern Ireland	3–0	(Argentina) 1978 W.C. Q
390	1977-12-21	Italy	0–1	Friendly
391	1978-03-22	Austria	1–0	Friendly
392	1978-04-19	Northern Ireland	0–0	Friendly
393	1978-09-20	Norway	1–1	(Italy) 1980 EURO Q
394	1978-10-11	Portugal	1–1	(Italy) 1980 EURO Q
395	1978-11-15	Israel	1–0	Friendly
396	1979-03-28	Austria	1–1	(Italy) 1980 EURO Q
397	1979-05-02	Austria	0–0	(Italy) 1980 EURO Q
398	1979-09-12	Norway	1–2	(Italy) 1980 EURO Q
399	1979-09-26	Netherlands	1–0	Friendly
400	1979-10-17	Portugal	2–0	(Italy) 1980 EURO Q
401	1979-11-21	Scotland	2–0	(Italy) 1980 EURO Q
402	1979-12-19	Scotland	1–3	(Italy) 1980 EURO Q

=== 1980–1989 ===
84 matches played:

1980–1989
Win Draw Defeat
M	Date	Opponent	Result	Event
403	1980-02-27	Luxembourg	5–0	Friendly
404	1980-03-18	Uruguay	2–0	Friendly
405	1980-04-02	Poland	2–1	Friendly
406	1980-06-06	Romania	2–1	Friendly
407	1980-06-12	England	1–1	(Italy) 1980 EURO
408	1980-06-15	Spain	2–1	(Italy) 1980 EURO
409	1980-06-18	Italy	0–0	(Italy) 1980 EURO
410	1980-06-22	West Germany	1–2	(Italy) 1980 EURO
411	1980-10-15	Republic of Ireland	1–1	(Spain) 1982 W.C. Q
412	1980-11-19	Netherlands	1–0	(Spain) 1982 W.C. Q
413	1980-12-21	Cyprus	0–2	(Spain) 1982 W.C. Q
414	1981-02-18	Cyprus	3–2	(Spain) 1982 W.C. Q
415	1981-03-25	Republic of Ireland	1–0	(Spain) 1982 W.C. Q
416	1981-04-29	France	3–2	(Spain) 1982 W.C. Q
417	1981-09-09	France	2–0	(Spain) 1982 W.C. Q
418	1981-10-14	Netherlands	3–0	(Spain) 1982 W.C. Q
419	1981-12-16	Spain	2–0	Friendly
420	1982-03-24	Romania	4–1	Friendly
421	1982-04-28	Bulgaria	2–1	Friendly
422	1982-05-27	Denmark	1–0	Friendly
423	1982-06-13	Argentina	0–1	(Spain) 1982 W.C.
424	1982-06-19	El Salvador	1–0	(Spain) 1982 W.C.
425	1982-06-22	Hungary	1–1	(Spain) 1982 W.C.
426	1982-06-28	Poland	3–0	(Spain) 1982 W.C.
427	1982-07-01	Soviet Union	0–1	(Spain) 1982 W.C.
428	1982-09-22	West Germany	0–0	Friendly
429	1982-10-06	Switzerland	3–0	(France) 1984 EURO Q
430	1982-12-15	Scotland	3–2	(France) 1984 EURO Q
431	1983-03-30	East Germany	1–2	(France) 1984 EURO Q
432	1983-04-27	East Germany	2–1	(France) 1984 EURO Q
433	1983-05-31	France	1–1	Friendly
434	1983-09-21	Netherlands	1–1	Friendly
435	1983-10-12	Scotland	1–1	(France) 1984 EURO Q
436	1983-11-09	Switzerland	3–1	(France) 1984 EURO Q
437	1984-02-29	West Germany	0–1	Friendly
438	1984-04-17	Poland	0–1	Friendly
439	1984-06-06	Hungary	2–2	Friendly
440	1984-06-13	Yugoslavia	2–0	(France) 1984 EURO
441	1984-06-16	France	5–0	(France) 1984 EURO
442	1984-06-19	Denmark	3–2	(France) 1984 EURO
443	1984-09-05	Argentina	0–2	Friendly
444	1984-10-17	Albania	3–1	(Mexico) 1986 W.C. Q
445	1984-12-19	Greece	0–0	(Mexico) 1986 W.C. Q
446	1984-12-22	Albania	2–0	(Mexico) 1986 W.C. Q
447	1985-03-27	Greece	2–0	(Mexico) 1986 W.C. Q
448	1985-05-01	Poland	2–0	(Mexico) 1986 W.C. Q
449	1985-09-11	Poland	0–0	(Mexico) 1986 W.C. Q
450	1985-10-16	Netherlands	1–0	(Mexico) 1986 W.C. Q
451	1985-11-20	Netherlands	2–1	(Mexico) 1986 W.C. Q
452	1986-02-19	Spain	3–0	Friendly
453	1986-04-23	Bulgaria	2–0	Friendly
454	1986-05-19	Yugoslavia	1–3	Friendly
455	1986-06-03	Mexico	2–1	(Mexico) 1986 W.C.
456	1986-06-08	Iraq	1–2	(Mexico) 1986 W.C.
457	1986-06-11	Paraguay	2–2	(Mexico) 1986 W.C.
458	1986-06-15	Soviet Union	3–4	(Mexico) 1986 W.C.
459	1986-06-22	Spain	1–1 (4–5 p)	(Mexico) 1986 W.C.
460	1986-06-25	Argentina	2–0	(Mexico) 1986 W.C.
461	1986-06-28	France	4–2	(Mexico) 1986 W.C.
462	1986-09-10	Republic of Ireland	2–2	(West Germany) 1988 EURO Q
463	1986-10-14	Luxembourg	0–6	(West Germany) 1988 EURO Q
464	1986-11-19	Bulgaria	1–1	Friendly
465	1987-02-04	Portugal	1–0	Friendly
466	1987-04-01	Scotland	4–1	(West Germany) 1988 EURO Q
467	1987-04-29	Republic of Ireland	0–0	(West Germany) 1988 EURO Q
468	1987-09-09	Netherlands	0–0	Friendly
469	1987-09-23	Bulgaria	2–0	(West Germany) 1988 EURO Q
470	1987-10-14	Scotland	2–0	(West Germany) 1988 EURO Q
471	1987-11-11	Luxembourg	3–0	(West Germany) 1988 EURO Q
472	1988-01-19	Israel	2–3	Friendly
473	1988-03-26	Hungary	3–0	Friendly
474	1988-06-05	Denmark	3–1	Friendly
475	1988-10-12	Brazil	1–2	Friendly
476	1988-10-19	Switzerland	1–0	(Italy) 1990 W.C. Q
477	1988-11-16	Czechoslovakia	0–0	(Italy) 1990 W.C. Q
478	1989-02-15	Portugal	1–1	(Italy) 1990 W.C. Q
479	1989-04-29	Czechoslovakia	2–1	(Italy) 1990 W.C. Q
480	1989-05-27	Yugoslavia	1–0	Friendly
481	1989-06-01	Luxembourg	0–5	(Italy) 1990 W.C. Q
482	1989-06-08	Canada	0–2	Friendly
483	1989-08-23	Denmark	3–0	Friendly
484	1989-09-06	Portugal	3–0	(Italy) 1990 W.C. Q
485	1989-10-11	Switzerland	2–2	(Italy) 1990 W.C. Q
486	1989-10-25	Luxembourg	1–1	(Italy) 1990 W.C. Q

=== 1990–1999 ===
89 matches played:

1990–1999
Win Draw Defeat
M	Date	Opponent	Result	Event
487	1990-01-17	Greece	2–0	Friendly
488	1990-02-21	Sweden	0–0	Friendly
489	1990-05-26	Romania	2–2	Friendly
490	1990-06-02	Mexico	3–0	Friendly
491	1990-06-06	Poland	1–1	Friendly
492	1990-06-17	South Korea	2–0	(Italy) 1990 W.C.
493	1990-06-17	Uruguay	3–1	(Italy) 1990 W.C.
494	1990-06-21	Spain	1–2	(Italy) 1990 W.C.
495	1990-06-26	England	1–0	(Italy) 1990 W.C.
496	1990-09-12	East Germany	0–2	Friendly
497	1990-10-17	Wales	3–1	(Sweden) 1992 EURO Q
498	1991-02-13	Italy	0–0	Friendly
499	1991-02-27	Luxembourg	3–0	(Sweden) 1992 EURO Q
500	1991-03-27	Wales	1–1	(Sweden) 1992 EURO Q
501	1991-05-01	Germany	1–0	(Sweden) 1992 EURO Q
502	1991-09-11	Luxembourg	0–2	(Sweden) 1992 EURO Q
503	1991-10-09	Hungary	0–2	Friendly
504	1991-11-20	Germany	0–1	(Sweden) 1992 EURO Q
505	1992-02-26	Tunisia	2–1	Friendly
506	1992-02-26	France	3–3	Friendly
507	1992-04-22	Cyprus	1–0	(United States) 1994 W.C. Q
508	1992-06-03	Faroe Islands	0–3	(United States) 1994 W.C. Q
509	1992-09-02	Czechoslovakia	1–2	(United States) 1994 W.C. Q
510	1992-10-14	Romania	1–0	(United States) 1994 W.C. Q
511	1992-11-18	Wales	2–0	(United States) 1994 W.C. Q
512	1993-02-13	Cyprus	0–3	(United States) 1994 W.C. Q
513	1993-03-31	Wales	2–0	(United States) 1994 W.C. Q
514	1993-05-22	Faroe Islands	3–0	(United States) 1994 W.C. Q
515	1993-10-06	Gabon	2–1	Friendly
516	1993-10-13	Romania	2–1	(United States) 1994 W.C. Q
517	1993-11-17	RCS	0–0	(United States) 1994 W.C. Q
518	1994-02-16	Malta	1–0	Friendly
519	1994-06-04	Zambia	9–0	Friendly
520	1994-06-08	Hungary	3–1	Friendly
521	1994-06-19	Morocco	1–0	(United States) 1994 W.C.
522	1994-06-25	Netherlands	1–0	(United States) 1994 W.C.
523	1994-06-29	Saudi Arabia	0–1	(United States) 1994 W.C.
524	1994-07-02	Germany	2–3	(United States) 1994 W.C.
525	1994-09-07	Armenia	2–0	(England) 1996 EURO Q
526	1994-10-12	Denmark	3–1	(England) 1996 EURO Q
527	1994-11-16	Macedonia	1–1	(England) 1996 EURO Q
528	1994-12-17	Spain	1–4	(England) 1996 EURO Q
529	1995-03-29	Spain	1–1	(England) 1996 EURO Q
530	1995-04-22	United States	1–0	Friendly
531	1995-04-26	Cyprus	2–0	(England) 1996 EURO Q
532	1995-06-07	Macedonia	0–5	(England) 1996 EURO Q
533	1995-08-23	Germany	1–2	Friendly
534	1995-09-06	Denmark	1–3	(England) 1996 EURO Q
535	1995-10-07	Armenia	0–2	(England) 1996 EURO Q
536	1995-11-15	Cyprus	1–1	(England) 1996 EURO Q
537	1996-03-27	France	0–2	Friendly
538	1996-04-24	Russia	0–0	Friendly
539	1996-05-29	Italy	2–2	Friendly
540	1996-08-31	Turkey	2–1	(France) 1998 W.C. Q
541	1996-10-09	San Marino	0–3	(France) 1998 W.C. Q
542	1996-12-14	Netherlands	0–3	(France) 1998 W.C. Q
543	1997-02-11	Northern Ireland	3–0	Friendly
544	1997-03-29	Wales	1–2	(France) 1998 W.C. Q
545	1997-04-30	Turkey	1–3	(France) 1998 W.C. Q
546	1997-06-07	San Marino	6–0	(France) 1998 W.C. Q
547	1997-09-06	Netherlands	3–1	(France) 1998 W.C. Q
548	1997-10-11	Wales	3–2	(France) 1998 W.C. Q
549	1997-10-29	Republic of Ireland	1–1	(France) 1998 W.C. Q
550	1997-11-15	Republic of Ireland	2–1	(France) 1998 W.C. Q
551	1998-02-25	United States	2–0	Friendly
552	1998-03-25	Norway	2–2	Friendly
553	1998-04-22	Romania	1–1	Friendly
554	1998-05-27	France	0–1	Friendly
555	1998-05-29	England	0–0	Friendly
556	1998-06-03	Colombia	2–0	Friendly
557	1998-06-06	Paraguay	1–0	Friendly
558	1998-06-13	Netherlands	0–0	(France) 1998 W.C.
559	1998-06-20	Mexico	2–2	(France) 1998 W.C.
560	1998-06-25	South Korea	1–1	(France) 1998 W.C.
561	1998-11-18	Luxembourg	0–0	Friendly
562	1999-02-03	Cyprus	0–1	Friendly
563	1999-02-05	Greece	0–1	Friendly
564	1999-02-09	Czech Republic	0–1	Friendly
565	1999-03-27	Bulgaria	0–1	Friendly
566	1999-03-30	Egypt	0–1	Friendly
567	1999-04-28	Romania	1–0	Friendly
568	1999-05-30	Peru	1–1	Friendly
569	1999-06-03	Japan	0–0	Friendly
570	1999-06-05	South Korea	1–2	Friendly
571	1999-08-18	Finland	3–4	Friendly
572	1999-09-04	Netherlands	5–5	Friendly
573	1999-09-07	Morocco	4–0	Friendly
574	1999-10-10	England	2–1	Friendly
575	1999-11-13	Italy	1–3	Friendly

=== 2000–2009 ===
98 matches played:

2000–2009
Win Draw Defeat
M	Date	Opponent	Result	Event
576	2000-02-23	Portugal	1–1	Friendly
577	2000-03-29	Netherlands	2–2	Friendly
578	2000-04-26	Norway	0–2	Friendly
579	2000-06-03	Denmark	2–2	Friendly
580	2000-06-10	Sweden	2–1	(Belgium) (Netherlands) 2000 EURO
581	2000-06-14	Italy	0–2	(Belgium) (Netherlands) 2000 EURO
582	2000-06-19	Turkey	0–2	(Belgium) (Netherlands) 2000 EURO
583	2000-08-16	Bulgaria	1–3	Friendly
584	2000-09-02	Croatia	0–0	(South Korea) (Japan) 2002 W.C. Q
585	2000-10-07	Latvia	0–4	(South Korea) (Japan) 2002 W.C. Q
586	2001-02-28	San Marino	10–1	(South Korea) (Japan) 2002 W.C. Q
587	2001-03-24	Scotland	2–2	(South Korea) (Japan) 2002 W.C. Q
588	2001-04-25	Czech Republic	1–1	Friendly
589	2001-06-02	Latvia	3–1	(South Korea) (Japan) 2002 W.C. Q
590	2001-06-06	San Marino	1–4	(South Korea) (Japan) 2002 W.C. Q
591	2001-08-15	Finland	4–1	Friendly
592	2001-09-05	Scotland	2–0	(South Korea) (Japan) 2002 W.C. Q
593	2001-10-06	Croatia	1–0	(South Korea) (Japan) 2002 W.C. Q
594	2001-11-10	Czech Republic	1–0	(South Korea) (Japan) 2002 W.C. Q
595	2001-11-14	Czech Republic	0–1	(South Korea) (Japan) 2002 W.C. Q
596	2002-02-13	Norway	1–0	Friendly
597	2002-03-27	Greece	3–2	Friendly
598	2002-04-17	Slovakia	1–1	Friendly
599	2002-05-14	Algeria	0–0	Friendly
600	2002-05-18	France	1–2	Friendly
601	2002-05-26	Costa Rica	1–0	Friendly
602	2002-06-04	Japan	2–2	(South Korea) (Japan) 2002 W.C.
603	2002-06-10	Tunisia	1–1	(South Korea) (Japan) 2002 W.C.
604	2002-06-14	Russia	3–2	(South Korea) (Japan) 2002 W.C.
605	2002-06-17	Brazil	2–0	(South Korea) (Japan) 2002 W.C.
606	2002-08-21	Poland	1–1	Friendly
607	2002-09-07	Bulgaria	0–2	(Portugal) 2004 EURO Q
608	2002-10-12	Andorra	0–1	(Portugal) 2004 EURO Q
609	2002-10-16	Estonia	0–1	(Portugal) 2004 EURO Q
610	2003-02-12	Algeria	1–3	Friendly
611	2003-03-29	Croatia	4–0	(Portugal) 2004 EURO Q
612	2003-04-30	Poland	3–1	Friendly
613	2003-06-07	Bulgaria	2–2	(Portugal) 2004 EURO Q
614	2003-06-11	Andorra	3–0	(Portugal) 2004 EURO Q
615	2003-08-20	Netherlands	1–1	Friendly
616	2003-09-10	Croatia	2–1	(Portugal) 2004 EURO Q
617	2003-10-11	Estonia	2–0	(Portugal) 2004 EURO Q
618	2004-02-18	France	0–2	Friendly
619	2004-03-31	Germany	3–0	Friendly
620	2004-04-28	Turkey	2–3	Friendly
621	2004-05-29	Netherlands	0–1	Friendly
622	2004-08-18	Norway	2–2	Friendly
623	2004-09-04	Lithuania	1–1	(Germany) 2006 W.C. Q
624	2004-10-09	Spain	2–0	(Germany) 2006 W.C. Q
625	2004-11-17	Serbia and Montenegro	0–2	(Germany) 2006 W.C. Q
626	2005-02-09	Egypt	4–0	Friendly
627	2005-03-26	Bosnia and Herzegovina	4–1	(Germany) 2006 W.C. Q
628	2005-03-30	San Marino	1–2	(Germany) 2006 W.C. Q
629	2005-06-04	Serbia and Montenegro	0–0	(Germany) 2006 W.C. Q
630	2005-08-17	Greece	2–0	Friendly
631	2005-09-03	Bosnia and Herzegovina	1–0	(Germany) 2006 W.C. Q
632	2005-09-07	San Marino	8–0	(Germany) 2006 W.C. Q
633	2005-10-08	Spain	0–2	(Germany) 2006 W.C. Q
634	2005-10-12	Lithuania	1–1	(Germany) 2006 W.C. Q
635	2006-03-01	Luxembourg	0–2	Friendly
636	2006-05-11	Saudi Arabia	1–2	Friendly
637	2006-05-20	Slovakia	1–1	Friendly
638	2006-05-24	Turkey	3–3	Friendly
639	2006-08-16	Kazakhstan	0–0	(Austria) (Switzerland) 2008 EURO Q
640	2006-09-06	Armenia	0–1	(Austria) (Switzerland) 2008 EURO Q
641	2006-10-07	Serbia	1–0	(Austria) (Switzerland) 2008 EURO Q
642	2006-10-11	Azerbaijan	3–0	(Austria) (Switzerland) 2008 EURO Q
643	2006-11-15	Poland	0–1	(Austria) (Switzerland) 2008 EURO Q
644	2007-02-07	Czech Republic	0–2	Friendly
645	2007-03-24	Portugal	4–0	(Austria) (Switzerland) 2008 EURO Q
646	2007-06-02	Portugal	1–2	(Austria) (Switzerland) 2008 EURO Q
647	2007-06-06	Finland	2–0	(Austria) (Switzerland) 2008 EURO Q
648	2007-08-22	Serbia	3–2	(Austria) (Switzerland) 2008 EURO Q
649	2007-09-12	Kazakhstan	2–2	(Austria) (Switzerland) 2008 EURO Q
650	2007-10-13	Finland	0–0	(Austria) (Switzerland) 2008 EURO Q
651	2007-10-17	Armenia	3–0	(Austria) (Switzerland) 2008 EURO Q
652	2007-11-17	Poland	2–0	(Austria) (Switzerland) 2008 EURO Q
653	2007-11-21	Azerbaijan	0–1	(Austria) (Switzerland) 2008 EURO Q
654	2008-03-26	Morocco	1–4	Friendly
655	2008-05-30	Italy	3–1	Friendly
656	2008-08-20	Germany	2–0	Friendly
657	2008-09-06	Estonia	3–2	(South Africa) 2010 W.C. Q
658	2008-09-10	Turkey	1–1	(South Africa) 2010 W.C. Q
659	2008-10-11	Armenia	2–0	(South Africa) 2010 W.C. Q
660	2008-10-15	Spain	1–2	(South Africa) 2010 W.C. Q
661	2008-11-19	Luxembourg	1–1	Friendly
662	2009-02-11	Slovenia	2–0	Friendly
663	2009-03-28	Bosnia and Herzegovina	2–4	(South Africa) 2010 W.C. Q
664	2009-04-01	Bosnia and Herzegovina	2–1	(South Africa) 2010 W.C. Q
665	2009-05-29	Chile	1–1	Friendly
666	2009-05-31	Japan	4–0	Friendly
667	2009-08-12	Czech Republic	3–1	Friendly
668	2009-09-05	Spain	5–0	(South Africa) 2010 W.C. Q
669	2009-09-09	Armenia	2–1	(South Africa) 2010 W.C. Q
670	2009-10-10	Turkey	2–0	(South Africa) 2010 W.C. Q
671	2009-10-14	Estonia	2–0	(South Africa) 2010 W.C. Q
672	2009-11-14	Hungary	3–0	Friendly
673	2009-11-17	Qatar	0–2	Friendly

=== 2010–2019 ===
111 matches played:

2010–2019
Win Draw Defeat
M	Date	Opponent	Result	Event
674	2010-03-03	Croatia	0–1	Friendly
675	2010-05-19	Bulgaria	2–1	Friendly
676	2010-08-11	Finland	1–0	Friendly
677	2010-09-03	Germany	0–1	(Poland) (Ukraine) 2012 EURO Q
678	2010-09-07	Turkey	3–2	(Poland) (Ukraine) 2012 EURO Q
679	2010-10-08	Kazakhstan	0–2	(Poland) (Ukraine) 2012 EURO Q
680	2010-10-12	Austria	4–4	(Poland) (Ukraine) 2012 EURO Q
681	2010-11-17	Russia	0–2	Friendly
682	2011-02-09	Finland	1–1	Friendly
683	2011-03-25	Austria	0–2	(Poland) (Ukraine) 2012 EURO Q
684	2011-03-29	Azerbaijan	4–1	(Poland) (Ukraine) 2012 EURO Q
685	2011-06-03	Turkey	1–1	(Poland) (Ukraine) 2012 EURO Q
686	2011-08-10	Slovenia	0–0	Friendly
687	2011-09-02	Azerbaijan	1–1	(Poland) (Ukraine) 2012 EURO Q
688	2011-09-06	United States	1–0	Friendly
689	2011-10-07	Kazakhstan	4–1	(Poland) (Ukraine) 2012 EURO Q
690	2011-10-11	Germany	3–1	(Poland) (Ukraine) 2012 EURO Q
691	2011-11-11	Romania	2–1	Friendly
692	2011-11-15	France	0–0	Friendly
693	2012-02-29	Greece	1–1	Friendly
694	2012-05-25	Montenegro	2–2	Friendly
695	2012-06-02	England	1–0	Friendly
696	2012-08-15	Netherlands	4–2	Friendly
697	2012-09-07	Wales	0–2	(Brazil) 2014 W.C. Q
698	2012-09-11	Croatia	1–1	(Brazil) 2014 W.C. Q
699	2012-10-12	Serbia	0–3	(Brazil) 2014 W.C. Q
700	2012-10-16	Scotland	2–0	(Brazil) 2014 W.C. Q
701	2013-02-06	Slovakia	2–1	Friendly
702	2013-03-22	Macedonia	0–2	(Brazil) 2014 W.C. Q
703	2013-03-26	Macedonia	1–0	(Brazil) 2014 W.C. Q
704	2013-05-29	United States	2–4	Friendly
705	2013-06-07	Serbia	2–1	(Brazil) 2014 W.C. Q
706	2013-08-14	France	0–0	Friendly
707	2013-09-06	Scotland	0–2	(Brazil) 2014 W.C. Q
708	2013-10-11	Croatia	1–2	(Brazil) 2014 W.C. Q
709	2013-10-15	Wales	1–1	(Brazil) 2014 W.C. Q
710	2013-11-14	Colombia	0–2	Friendly
711	2013-11-19	Japan	2–3	Friendly
712	2014-03-05	Ivory Coast	2–2	Friendly
713	2014-06-01	Sweden	0–2	Friendly
714	2014-06-07	Tunisia	1–0	Friendly
715	2014-06-17	Algeria	1–2	(Brazil) 2014 W.C.
716	2014-06-22	Russia	1–0	(Brazil) 2014 W.C.
717	2014-06-26	South Korea	0–1	(Brazil) 2014 W.C.
718	2014-07-01	United States	1–2	(Brazil) 2014 W.C.
719	2014-07-05	Argentina	1–0	(Brazil) 2014 W.C.
720	2014-09-04	Australia	2–0	Friendly
721	2014-10-10	Andorra	6–0	(France) 2016 EURO Q
722	2014-10-13	Bosnia and Herzegovina	1–1	(France) 2016 EURO Q
723	2014-11-16	Iceland	3–1	Friendly
724	2014-11-16	Wales	0–0	(France) 2016 EURO Q
725	2015-03-28	Cyprus	5–0	(France) 2016 EURO Q
726	2015-03-31	Israel	0–1	(France) 2016 EURO Q
727	2015-06-07	France	3–4	Friendly
728	2015-06-12	Wales	1–0	(France) 2016 EURO Q
729	2015-09-03	Bosnia and Herzegovina	3–1	(France) 2016 EURO Q
730	2015-09-06	Cyprus	0–1	(France) 2016 EURO Q
731	2015-10-10	Andorra	1–4	(France) 2016 EURO Q
732	2015-10-13	Israel	3–1	(France) 2016 EURO Q
733	2015-11-13	Italy	3–1	Friendly
734	2016-03-29	Portugal	2–1	Friendly
735	2016-05-28	Switzerland	1–2	Friendly
736	2016-06-01	Finland	1–1	Friendly
737	2016-06-05	Norway	3–2	Friendly
738	2016-06-13	Italy	0–2	(France) 2016 EURO
739	2016-06-18	Republic of Ireland	3–0	(France) 2016 EURO
740	2016-06-22	Sweden	0–1	(France) 2016 EURO
741	2016-06-26	Hungary	0–4	(France) 2016 EURO
742	2016-07-01	Wales	1–3	(France) 2016 EURO
743	2016-09-01	Spain	0–2	Friendly
744	2016-09-06	Cyprus	0–3	(Russia) 2018 W.C. Q
745	2016-10-07	Bosnia and Herzegovina	4–0	(Russia) 2018 W.C. Q
746	2016-10-10	Gibraltar	0–6	(Russia) 2018 W.C. Q
747	2016-11-09	Netherlands	1–1	Friendly
748	2016-11-13	Estonia	8–1	(Russia) 2018 W.C. Q
749	2017-03-25	Greece	1–1	(Russia) 2018 W.C. Q
750	2017-03-28	Russia	3–3	Friendly
751	2017-06-09	Estonia	0–2	(Russia) 2018 W.C. Q
752	2017-08-31	Gibraltar	9–0	(Russia) 2018 W.C. Q
753	2017-09-03	Greece	1–2	(Russia) 2018 W.C. Q
754	2017-10-07	Bosnia and Herzegovina	3–4	(Russia) 2018 W.C. Q
755	2017-10-10	Cyprus	4–0	(Russia) 2018 W.C. Q
756	2017-11-10	Mexico	3–3	Friendly
757	2017-11-14	Japan	1–0	Friendly
758	2018-03-27	Saudi Arabia	4–0	Friendly
759	2018-06-02	Portugal	0–0	Friendly
760	2018-06-06	Egypt	3–0	Friendly
761	2018-06-11	Costa Rica	4–1	Friendly
762	2018-06-18	Panama	3–0	(Russia) 2018 W.C.
763	2018-06-23	Tunisia	5–2	(Russia) 2018 W.C.
764	2018-06-28	England	0–1	(Russia) 2018 W.C.
765	2018-07-02	Japan	3–2	(Russia) 2018 W.C.
766	2018-07-06	Brazil	1–2	(Russia) 2018 W.C.
767	2018-07-10	France	1–0	(Russia) 2018 W.C.
768	2018-07-14	England	2–0	(Russia) 2018 W.C.
769	2018-09-07	Scotland	0–4	Friendly
770	2018-09-11	Iceland	0–3	2018–19 Nations League
771	2018-10-12	Switzerland	2–1	2018–19 Nations League
772	2018-10-16	Netherlands	1–1	Friendly
773	2018-11-15	Iceland	2–0	2018–19 Nations League
774	2018-11-18	Switzerland	5–2	2018–19 Nations League
775	2019-03-21	Russia	3–1	(Europe) 2020 EURO Q
776	2019-03-24	Cyprus	0–2	(Europe) 2020 EURO Q
777	2019-06-08	Kazakhstan	3–0	(Europe) 2020 EURO Q
778	2019-06-11	Scotland	3–0	(Europe) 2020 EURO Q
779	2019-09-06	San Marino	0–4	(Europe) 2020 EURO Q
780	2019-09-09	Scotland	0–4	(Europe) 2020 EURO Q
781	2019-10-10	San Marino	9–0	(Europe) 2020 EURO Q
782	2019-10-13	Kazakhstan	0–2	(Europe) 2020 EURO Q
783	2019-11-16	Russia	1–4	(Europe) 2020 EURO Q
784	2019-11-19	Cyprus	6–1	(Europe) 2020 EURO Q

=== 2020–2029 ===
87 matches played (as of 15 November 2026):

2020–2029
Win Draw Defeat
M	Date	Opponent	Result	Event
785	2020-09-05	Denmark	0–2	2020–21 UEFA Nations League
786	2020-09-08	Iceland	5–1	2020–21 UEFA Nations League
787	2020-10-08	Ivory Coast	1–1	Friendly
788	2020-10-11	England	2–1	2020–21 UEFA Nations League
789	2020-10-14	Iceland	1–2	2020–21 UEFA Nations League
790	2020-11-11	Switzerland	2–1	Friendly
791	2020-11-15	England	2–0	2020–21 UEFA Nations League
792	2020-11-18	Denmark	4–2	2020–21 UEFA Nations League
793	2021-03-24	Wales	3–1	(Qatar) 2022 W.C. Q
794	2021-03-27	Czech Republic	1–1	(Qatar) 2022 W.C. Q
795	2021-03-30	Belarus	8–0	(Qatar) 2022 W.C. Q
796	2021-06-03	Greece	1–1	Friendly
797	2021-06-06	Croatia	1–0	Friendly
798	2021-06-12	Russia	3–0	(Europe) 2020 EURO
799	2021-06-17	Denmark	1–2	(Europe) 2020 EURO
800	2021-06-21	Finland	0–2	(Europe) 2020 EURO
801	2021-06-27	Portugal	1–0	(Europe) 2020 EURO
802	2021-07-02	Italy	1–2	(Europe) 2020 EURO
803	2021-09-02	Estonia	2–5	(Qatar) 2022 W.C. Q
804	2021-09-05	Czech Republic	3–0	(Qatar) 2022 W.C. Q
805	2021-09-08	Belarus	0–1	(Qatar) 2022 W.C. Q
806	2021-10-07	France	2–3	(Italy) 2021 UEFA Nations League Finals
807	2021-10-10	Italy	2–1	(Italy) 2021 UEFA Nations League Finals
808	2021-11-13	Estonia	3–1	(Qatar) 2022 W.C. Q
809	2021-11-16	Wales	1–1	(Qatar) 2022 W.C. Q
810	2022-03-26	Republic of Ireland	2–2	Friendly
811	2022-03-29	Burkina Faso	3–0	Friendly
812	2022-06-03	Netherlands	1–4	2022–23 UEFA Nations League
813	2022-06-08	Poland	6–1	2022–23 UEFA Nations League
814	2022-06-11	Wales	1–1	2022–23 UEFA Nations League
815	2022-06-14	Poland	0–1	2022–23 UEFA Nations League
816	2022-09-22	Wales	2–1	2022–23 UEFA Nations League
817	2022-09-25	Netherlands	1–0	2022–23 UEFA Nations League
818	2022-11-18	Egypt	2–1	Friendly
819	2022-11-23	Canada	1–0	(Qatar) 2022 W.C.
820	2022-11-27	Morocco	0–2	(Qatar) 2022 W.C.
821	2022-12-01	Croatia	0–0	(Qatar) 2022 W.C.
822	2023-03-24	Sweden	0–3	(Germany) 2024 EURO Q
823	2023-03-28	Germany	2–3	Friendly
824	2023-06-17	Austria	1–1	(Germany) 2024 EURO Q
825	2023-06-20	Estonia	0–3	(Germany) 2024 EURO Q
826	2023-09-09	Azerbaijan	0–1	(Germany) 2024 EURO Q
827	2023-09-12	Estonia	5–0	(Germany) 2024 EURO Q
828	2023-10-13	Austria	2–3	(Germany) 2024 EURO Q
829	2023-10-16	Sweden	1–1	(Germany) 2024 EURO Q
830	2023-11-15	Serbia	1–0	Friendly
831	2023-11-19	Azerbaijan	5–0	(Germany) 2024 EURO Q
832	2024-03-23	Republic of Ireland	0–0	Friendly
833	2024-03-26	England	2–2	Friendly
834	2024-06-05	Montenegro	2–0	Friendly
835	2024-06-09	Luxembourg	3–0	Friendly
836	2024-06-17	Slovakia	0–1	(Germany) 2024 EURO
837	2024-06-22	Romania	2–0	(Germany) 2024 EURO
838	2024-06-26	Ukraine	0–0	(Germany) 2024 EURO
839	2024-07-01	France	1–0	(Germany) 2024 EURO
840	2024-09-06	Israel	3–1	2024–25 UEFA Nations League
841	2024-09-09	France	0–2	2024–25 UEFA Nations League
842	2024-10-10	Italy	2–2	2024–25 UEFA Nations League
843	2024-10-14	France	1–2	2024–25 UEFA Nations League
844	2024-11-14	Italy	0–1	2024–25 UEFA Nations League
845	2024-11-17	Israel	1–0	2024–25 UEFA Nations League
846	2025-03-20	Ukraine	1–3	2024–25 UEFA Nations League play-offs
847	2025-03-23	Ukraine	3–0	2024–25 UEFA Nations League play-offs
848	2025-06-06	North Macedonia	1–1	(Canada) (United States) (Mexico) 2026 W.C. Q
849	2025-06-09	Wales	4–3	(Canada) (United States) (Mexico) 2026 W.C. Q
850	2025-09-04	Liechtenstein	0–6	(Canada) (United States) (Mexico) 2026 W.C. Q
851	2025-09-07	Kazakhstan	6–0	(Canada) (United States) (Mexico) 2026 W.C. Q
852	2025-10-10	North Macedonia	0–0	(Canada) (United States) (Mexico) 2026 W.C. Q
853	2025-10-13	Wales	2–4	(Canada) (United States) (Mexico) 2026 W.C. Q
854	2025-11-15	Kazakhstan	1–1	(Canada) (United States) (Mexico) 2026 W.C. Q
855	2025-11-18	Liechtenstein	7–0	(Canada) (United States) (Mexico) 2026 W.C. Q
856	2026-03-28	United States	2–5	Friendly
857	2026-03-31	Mexico	1–1	Friendly
858	2026-06-02	Croatia	0–2	Friendly
859	2026-06-06	Tunisia	5–0	Friendly
860	2026-06-15	Egypt	1–1	(Canada) (United States) (Mexico) 2026 W.C.
861	2026-06-21	Iran	0–0	(Canada) (United States) (Mexico) 2026 W.C.
862	2026-06-26	New Zealand	1–5	(Canada) (United States) (Mexico) 2026 W.C.
863	2026-07-01	Senegal	3–2	(Canada) (United States) (Mexico) 2026 W.C.
864	2026-07-06	United States	1–4	(Canada) (United States) (Mexico) 2026 W.C.
865	2026-07-10	Spain	2–1	(Canada) (United States) (Mexico) 2026 W.C.
866	2026-09-25	Italy	0–2	2026–27 UEFA Nations League
867	2026-09-28	France	0–1	2026–27 UEFA Nations League
868	2026-10-02	Turkey	3–0	2026–27 UEFA Nations League
869	2026-10-05	France	4–1	2026–27 UEFA Nations League
870	2026-11-12	Turkey	1–2	2026–27 UEFA Nations League
871	2026-11-15	Italy	4–1	2026–27 UEFA Nations League
872	2027-03-25 to 2027-03-27	Germany		2026–27 UEFA Nations League
872	2027-03-28 to 2027-03-30	Germany		2026–27 UEFA Nations League
