= Bill Dijxhoorn =

Dutch footballer and referee

Personal information
- Full name: Gerard Willem Dijkshoorn
- Date of birth: 10 July 1879
- Place of birth: Rotterdam, Netherlands
- Date of death: 16 October 1937 (aged 58)
- Place of death: Asunción, Paraguay

Senior career*
Years	Team	Apps	(Gls)
1894–1896	Enschede FC		
1896–1898	HBS		
First secretary of
Dutch Football Association
In office
1898–1907
- * Club domestic league appearances and goals

Gerard Willem Dijkshoorn, better known as Bill Dijxhoorn (10 July 1879 – 16 October 1937), was a Dutch football referee who officiated one international match in 1908.

== Sporting career ==
Gerard Willem Dijkshoorn was born in Rotterdam on 10 July 1879. He began his football career at Enschede FC (later EFC Prinses Wilhelmina), and on 25 October 1896, the 17-year-old Dijxhoorn refereed a match between them and Handelschule FV, which ended in an 11–0 win in favor of his club. In mid-1897, he joined HBS in The Hague, where he was also a board member. In October 1897, the 18-year-old Dijxhoorn was elected to the board of the Dutch Football Association (NBV) as its second secretary.

In early 1899, Dĳxhoorn already was the first secretary of the NVB, and as such, it was he who introduced the method of ranking the Dutch clubs based on the ratio of points earned to matches played, with the standings being then published in the Nederlandsche Sport; this system was officially adopted during the following season. As NBV's first secretary, he was also responsible for setting up schedules, organizing trips, and even solving several issues that arose during the Dutch League Championships, such as awarding games by a 5–0 forfeit. On 7 May 1899, he refereed the final of the 1898–99 KNVB Cup between RAP Amsterdam, the reigning national champion, and HVV Den Haag; in the first half, Dijxhoorn disallowed two goals from RAP, one due to handball and the other for offside, but they still managed to score the winning goal in the 116th minute, thus becoming the first team in the Netherlands to win the Dutch league-and-cup double.

Dijxhoorn was also a member of the Dutch national team committee, and therefore, he was present in its first-ever matches, more notably in their second on 5 May 1905, which ended in a 4–1 win over Belgium after extra-time; the local press stated that following Belgium's late equalizer, the Dutch national coach Cees van Hasselt turned pale, while Dijxhoorn "says an ugly word". The local press also added that at the start of the extra-time period, "we, supporters, stand silently at the line, but Bill Dijxhoorn makes a bold decision: "All together", he says", so it seems that he was some sort of assistant coach to van Hasselt. Later that same year, in October, he was one of the founding members of a Dutch federation for football referees, of which he became the first president.

In July 1907, Dijxhoorn, together with van Hasselt, Cornelis Hirschman, Jan van den Berg, and a few others, co-founded De Zwaluwen, a football organization founded to improve the level of football in the Netherlands. On 18 April 1908, the 28-year-old refereed his first (and only) international match, a friendly between Belgium and England amateurs, which ended in an 8–2 win to the latter. In the inaugural edition of the Coupe Jean Dupuich, which was held between 19 and 21 April 1908, he assembled a team that participated in the tournament, the so-called Dijxhoorn XI, was composed mostly of players from HBS, and ended up being knocked out in the quarter-finals by Preussen Berlin (6–1).

== Later life and death ==
At some point in the early 1910s, Dijxhoorn emigrated to Paraguay, where he began working at Azucarera Paraguaya, a sugar factory in Asunción, the city in which he married Paula Rosa Ferrari on 16 December 1916. Dijxhoorn died in Asunción on 16 October 1937, at the age of 58.
