= John Bollington =

English footballer and coach

Personal information
- Full name: John Edward Bollington
- Date of birth: 31 July 1886
- Place of birth: Belper, England
- Date of death: 21 May 1965 (aged 78)
- Place of death: Walsall, England
- Position: Wing half

Senior career*
Years	Team	Apps	(Gls)
- Walsall
1919–1920	Southend United	1	(0)
1920–1921	Brighton & Hove Albion	14	(0)

Managerial career
- ANVV De Zwaluwen
- 1923–1931: CVV Vriendenschaar
- 1924: Netherlands
- * Club domestic league appearances and goals

John Edward Bollington, also known as Jan Bollington (31 July 1886 – 21 May 1965) was an English football player and coach.

== Career ==
Born in Belper, Bollington played in the Football League for Southend United and Brighton & Hove Albion. He joined Southend in August 1919 from the Army, leaving them in September 1920 to sign for Brighton. He suffered a broken leg during an FA Cup match against Cardiff City while attempting to tackle opposition forward Jimmy Gill. The injury ultimately ended his playing career, while Cardiff held a benefit match in November 1921 against Brighton to raise funds for him.

He later became a football manager in the Netherlands; he was in charge of amateur club CVV Vriendenschaar between 1923 and 1931, having previously coached ANVV De Zwaluwen. He was also in charge of the Netherlands national team for one match in 1924, leading them to a 2–1 win over South Africa.
