= Pierre Kogel =

Belgian footballer and coach

Personal information
- Full name: Pierre Hubert Joseph Guillaume Félix Kogel
- Date of birth: 3 April 1886
- Place of birth: Liège, Belgium
- Date of death: 1 January 1938 (aged 51)
- Place of death: Villiers-le-Bel, France
- Position: Goalkeeper

Senior career*
Years	Team	Apps	(Gls)
1902–1910	Standard de Liège		

International career
1910	Belgium	1	(0)

Managerial career
- 1922–1924: Standard de Liège
- * Club domestic league appearances and goals

Pierre Kogel (3 April 1886 – 1 January 1938) was a Belgian footballer and coach. He was one of the founders of Standard de Liège, as well as its treasurer. Kogel was the goalkeeper for Standard de Liège when the club won its first D1 in 1909.

== Career as player ==
- 1902–1910 : Standard de Liège

38 matches, including 19 in D1.

== Honours as player ==
- D2 Champions (Liège) in : 1905 – 1906 – 1907 – 1908
- D2 Champions in : 1909

The Champion D2 (Liège) won the chance to compete in the final round against the D2 Champions of Brabant, Flanders and Antwerp. Only one team were promoted to D1. It wasn't until the 5th attempt that Standard de Liège were able to join the élite.

== Career as coach ==
- 1922–1924 : Standard de Liège
