= Fernand Buyle =

Belgian footballer

Personal information
- Full name: Fernand Auguste Charles Buyle
- Date of birth: 3 March 1918
- Place of birth: Molenbeek-Saint-Jean, Belgium
- Date of death: 22 January 1992 (aged 73)
- Height: 1.70 m (5 ft 7 in)
- Position: Striker

Senior career*
Years	Team	Apps	(Gls)
1934–1953	Daring Club Bruxelles		

International career
1937–1945	Belgium	16	(1)
- * Club domestic league appearances and goals

Fernand Auguste Charles Buyle was a Belgian footballer, born on 3 March 1918 in Molenbeek-Saint-Jean, date of death 22 January 1992.

He was a striker for Daring Club de Bruxelles from the 1934–1953 seasons and played sixteen times for Belgium including one match at the 1938 World Cup.

== Honours ==
- International from 1937 to 1945 (16 caps, 1 goal)
- Participation in the 1938 FIFA World Cup (played 1 match)
- Champions of Belgium in 1936 and 1937 with Daring Club Bruxelles
- Belgian Cup Winners in 1935 with Daring Club Bruxelles
