= Désiré Van Den Audenaerde =

Belgian footballer

Personal information
- Date of birth: 3 September 1923
- Date of death: 25 February 2011 (aged 87)
- Position: Midfielder

Senior career*
Years	Team	Apps	(Gls)
- Antwerp

International career
1944–1948	Belgium	5	(0)
- * Club domestic league appearances and goals

Désiré Van Den Audenaerde (3 September 1923 – 25 February 2011) was a Belgian footballer who played as a midfielder. He made five appearances for the Belgium national team from 1944 to 1948.
