= Koos van Gelder =

Dutch footballer

Personal information
- Full name: Jacobus Cornelis Koos van Gelder
- Date of birth: 19 October 1908
- Place of birth: IJsselmonde, Netherlands
- Date of death: 26 March 1984 (aged 75)
- Place of death: Voorburg, Netherlands
- Position: Forward

Senior career*
Years	Team	Apps	(Gls)
1925–1941	VUC		

International career
1926–1935	Netherlands	5	(1)
- * Club domestic league appearances and goals

Koos van Gelder (19 October 1908 – 26 March 1984) was a Dutch footballer.

He played in five matches for the Netherlands national football team from 1926 to 1935. As of 2010, he was the 6th youngest player to make his debut for the Oranje and the first ever international player of The Hague side VUC.

Later he became a referee and was an assistant referee at several international matches. He was in charge of an international match between Belgium and Luxembourg in 1954.
