= Switzerland national football team results =

== Match overview ==
As of 6 October 2026

Type	Record							
Type	G	W	D	L	GF	GA	GD	% Win
FIFA World Cup	47	17	10	20	65	79	–14	36.17
FIFA World Cup qualification	148	69	38	41	248	155	+93	46.62
UEFA European Championship	23	5	11	7	24	28	–4	21.74
UEFA European Championship Qualification	120	65	26	29	234	128	+106	54.17
UEFA Nations League	27	9	4	13	43	38	+5	33.33
International friendlies	448	141	102	205	642	871	–229	31.47
Other Tournaments (Note: Includes Central European International Cup, Summer Olympic Games)	77	12	13	52	79	164	–85	15.58
Total	890	319	204	367	1,335	1,463	–128	35.84

=== Opponents per confederations ===
As of 6 October 2026

Opponents	Pld	W	D	L	GF	GA	GD	Win %
UEFA	815	281	185	349	1,206	1,379	−173	34.48
CONMEBOL	34	11	9	14	42	45	−3	32.35
CONCACAF	18	11	5	2	37	17	+20	61.11
AFC	13	10	3	0	34	9	+25	76.92
CAF	10	6	2	2	16	13	+3	60.00
OFC	0	0	0	0	0	0	+0	—
Total	890	319	204	367	1,335	1,463	−128	35.84

For reasons of size, the results are divided into twenty-year periods:

- Switzerland national football team results (1905–1918)
- Switzerland national football team results (1920–1939)
- Switzerland national football team results (1940–1959)
- Switzerland national football team results (1960–1979)
- Switzerland national football team results (1980–1999)
- Switzerland national football team results (2000–2019)
- Switzerland national football team results (2020–present)
