= Ferdinand Caremans =

Belgian footballer

Personal information
- Date of birth: 6 July 1893
- Place of birth: Antwerp, Belgium
- Date of death: 13 December 1967 (aged 74)
- Position: Defender

International career
Years	Team	Apps	(Gls)
1922	Belgium	1	(0)

Ferdinand Caremans (6 July 1893 – 13 December 1967) was a Belgian footballer. He played in one match for the Belgium national football team in 1922.
