= Frans Petit =

Dutch footballer

Personal information
- Date of birth: 15 November 1898
- Date of death: 20 February 1971 (aged 72)

International career
Years	Team	Apps	(Gls)
1922	Netherlands	1	(0)

Frans Petit (15 November 1898 – 20 February 1971) was a Dutch footballer. He played in one match for the Netherlands national football team in 1922.
