= Émile Hanse =

Belgian footballer

Olympic medal record

Men's Football
| Gold medal – first place | 1920 Antwerp | Team competition |

Émile Jean Ghislain Hanse (10 August 1892 – 5 April 1981) was a Belgian football (soccer) player who competed in the 1920 Summer Olympics. He was a member of the Belgium team, which won the gold medal in the football tournament. Hanse played for R.U. Saint-Gilloise and appeared in 254 matches and scored 23 goals.
