= KNVB Cup =

Association football tournament in the Netherlands

- Founded: 1898; 128 years ago
- Region: Netherlands
- Teams: 110
- Qualifier for: UEFA Europa League; Johan Cruyff Shield
- Current champions: AZ (5th title)
- Most championships: Ajax (20 titles)
- Broadcaster: ESPN
- Website: eurojackpotknvbbeker.nl/
- 2026–27 KNVB Cup

The KNVB Beker (pronounced [ˌkaːʔɛɱveːˈbeː ˈbeːkər]; English: KNVB Cup), branded as the Eurojackpot KNVB Beker for sponsorship reasons, is a competition in the Netherlands organised by the Royal Dutch Football Association (KNVB) since 1898. It was based on the format of the English FA Cup. Outside the Netherlands, it is often referred to as the Dutch Cup. The tournament consists of all teams from the top four tiers of Dutch league football (Eredivisie, Eerste Divisie, Tweede Divisie and Derde Divisie), as well as the 24 semi-finalists (or replacements) of the six KNVB District Cups. The finals of the tournament traditionally takes place in De Kuip, and has been held there every season since the 1989 final. The winners of the cup compete against the winners of the Eredivisie for the Johan Cruyff Shield, (equivalent to a super cup) which acts as the curtain raiser for the following season.

== History ==
=== Early history ===
The first attempt to hold a knock-out competition open to all clubs in the Netherlands was made in 1894, with the winners receiving a trophy offered by H.M.C. Holdert, former president of V.V.A. (Amsterdam). Seven teams entered and the first ever cup match in the Netherlands was thus held on 11 February, between Haarlem and HFC, ending in a 3–1 win to the latter. However, no other match was played due to the withdraws of several teams, and the lack of interest shown by the clubs caused Holdert to withdraw his trophy, so the final between HFC and R.A.P. was canceled, but four years later, in January 1898, Holdert offered another cup, to be contested just like the English FA Cup, and thus the KNVB Cup was conceived during a board meeting of the Dutch Football Association, in The Hague, on 19 January 1898. Initially, it was decided to stage a competition for this new trophy already in the ongoing 1897–98 season, but the board had to cancel it after a prolonged stretch of bad weather in the first weeks of February had led to numerous match postponements in the western leagues.

The tournament finally began the following season, 1898–99. The first final was played on 9 May 1899 between RAP Amsterdam and HVV Den Haag, and ended in a 1–0 victory for the former thanks to a goal from Jan Hisgen in extra-time.

In 1946, the trophy was changed to one made out of silver, which was extremely rare in the immediate aftermath of World War II. That trophy remains in use today.

=== Recent history ===
In 2018, a trophy colored in gold was commissioned to commemorate the 100th edition of the tournament.

=== Name changes ===
Like many national cup competitions, the name of the tournament has changed with sponsorship. From 1995, the competition went from being the KNVB Beker to being known as the Amstel Cup after the then sponsor Amstel. On 16 August 2005, the name was changed to the Gatorade Cup after the drinks company Gatorade. In 2006, the name returned to being the KNVB Beker with Gatorade remaining as the principal sponsor.

On 12 January 2018, it was announced that TOTO would become the title sponsor of the KNVB Cup through the 2021–22 season, immediately rebranding the competition as the TOTO KNVB Beker.

On 10 June 2025, a new landmark sponsorship agreement was announced with EUROJACKPOT, marking a change in title sponsorship for the first time since 2018. Under the five-year deal, running through the 2029–30 season, the competition was renamed the Eurojackpot KNVB Beker.

=== European competition ===
Up until 1998, the winner of the cup entered into the UEFA Cup Winners' Cup, but with the abandonment of that tournament, the winner now goes into the UEFA Europa League. If the winning team has finished in the top two of the Eredivisie and thus gained entry into the UEFA Champions League, the berth will be redistributed to that season's Eredivisie.

In 1998, both KNVB Cup finalists, Ajax and PSV, gained entry in the Champions League, so a third-place play-off was played between the beaten semi-finalists, SC Heerenveen and FC Twente, to determine who would take the Cup Winners' Cup place.

== Past finals ==
Season	Winners	Scorers	Result	Runners-up	Scorers	Venue	Att.
1898–99	RAP	Hisgen 116'	1–0 (a.e.t.)	HVV	–	Heemstede	
1899–1900	Velocitas Breda (2)	Clifford 65' 80'; Altinck du Cloux 70'	3–1	Ajax Leiden	Van Zanten 15'	Rotterdam	
1900–01	HBS Craeyenhout	Bekker; Mijer; Lagerwey	4–3 (a.e.t.)	RAP	Kampschreur; Hartoch; Glaser	Haarlem	
1901–02	Haarlem	Van den Berg; Pennink	2–1	HBS Craeyenhout	Bekker	Heemstede	
1902–03	HVV	Van den Berg 8' (o.g.); J. Heyning 49'; Lotsy; J. de Sol; E. Sol; D. Heyning	6–1	HBS Craeyenhout	Van den Broeck d'Obrenau	Sportpark De Diepput	
1903–04	HFC	Holdert 80' (pen.); Van der Vinne 83'; Henny 85'	3–1	HVV	Froger 30'	Sportpark De Diepput	1,000
1904–05	VOC (2)	Jerris; Van Duijn; H. Breuning pen.	3–0	HBS Craeyenhout 2 (2)	–	Sportpark De Diepput	
1905–06	Concordia (2)	Thomée 17'; Slingelandt	3–2	Volharding (2)	Baggelaar 87'	Valkenboschlaan	
1906–07	VOC (2)	J. Hörburger; H. Breuning; A. Hörburger; C. Breuning pen.	4–3 (a.e.t.)	Voorwaarts (2)	Nieuwenhuizen ? 89' (pen.)	Sportpark De Diepput	
1907–08	HBS Craeyenhout 2 (2)	Feijtes 10' ? De Jong	3–1	VOC (3)	Verduin 88'	Rotterdam	
1908–09	Quick Den Haag 2 (Res.)	Goedhart; Schaaf	2–0	VOC (2)	–	Dordrecht	
1909–10	Quick Den Haag 2 (Res.)	Loos 15'; Richelle	2–0	HVV 2 (Res.)	–	Delft	
1910–11	Quick	Remus 45'	1–0	Haarlem	–	Haarlem	
1911–12	Haarlem	Houtkooper 44' 50'	2–0	Vitesse	–	Amsterdam	
1912–13	HFC	Laan 10' 60' 65'; Francken 75'	4–1	DFC	Kleijn 20'	Het Houten Stadion	6,000
1913–14	DFC	Sunderman; De Wijs; Bouman	3–2	Haarlem	Houtkooper; Schravendijk	Het Houten Stadion	8,000
1914–15	HFC	Seignette 45'	1–0	HBS Craeyenhout	–	Het Nederlandsch Sportpark	
1915–16	Quick	Van Riemsdijk 60'	2–1 (a.e.t.)	HBS Craeyenhout	Poortman 75'	Sportpark Houtrust	
1916–17	Ajax (2)	Lucas 20'; Van Doort 21'; De Natris; Brokmann pen.	5–0	VSV (3)	–	Het Nederlandsch Sportpark	
1917–18	RCH (2)	Bloemheuvel 30'; De Koning 35'	2–1	VVA Amsterdam	Seemann 47'	Het Nederlandsch Sportpark	
1918–19	Not played						
1919–20	CVV (2)	Van de Steen; Van Oyen	2–1	VUC (2)	Van de Waal	Dordrecht	
1920–21	Schoten (2)	Ruys; Ruil	2–1	RFC (2)	?	Utrecht	
1921–24	Not played						
1924–25	ZFC	Hoogmoed 3'; Potse 10'; Schoen 40' 60'	5–1	Xerxes (2)	Van Rooij 20' (o.g.)	Utrecht	
1925–26	LONGA (2)	Thijsselink pen. Pallandt; Ghering	5–2	De Spartaan	?	Utrecht	3,000
1926–27	VUC	Dill 50' 75'; Klein 56'	3–1	Vitesse	Van Bochove 10'	Arnhem	6,000
1927–28	RCH	Van der Bend 30' (o.g.); De Groot 70' (o.g.)	2–0	PEC Zwolle (2)	–	Sportpark Berestein	400
1928–29	Not played						
1929–30	Feijenoord	Barendregt 35'	1–0	Excelsior	–	Sparta Stadion Het Kasteel	10,000
1930–31	Not played						
1931–32	DFC	De Smit 35' 46' 75'; Punt 74'; Ruisch 105'	5–4 (a.e.t.)	PSV	De Visser 2' 40'; Van den Broek 50'; Hunting 73'	Koning Willem II Stadion	5,000
1932–33	Not played						
1933–34	Velocitas Groningen	Peterse 84' (pen.); Bonsema 87'; Van de Velde 91'	3–2 (a.e.t.)	Feijenoord	Burg 77'; Paauwe 80'	Utrecht	5,000
1934–35	Feijenoord	Paauwe 55'; Groenendijk 57' 67' 80' 85'	5–2	Helmond (2)	Drouwen 42'; Van der Velden 61'	Kromme Zandweg	12,000
1935–36	Roermond	Pijpers 30' 82'; Pubben 38'; Imkamp 68'	4–2	KFC	Bouthoorn 55' 70'	Vught	200
1936–37	FC Eindhoven	Kruger 87'	1–0	De Spartaan (2)	–	Sportterrein aan de Spaarndammerdijk	4,000
1937–38	VSV	Sterk 40' 42' 46'; Bot 60'	4–1	AGOVV	Kluin 5'	Utrecht	3,000
1938–39	FC Wageningen	Zittersteijn 45' 95'	2–1 (a.e.t.)	PSV	Hunting 50'	Stadium Eendracht Arnhem	3,500
1939–42	Not played						
1942–43	Ajax	Stoffelen 3' (pen.); Fischer 24'; Van Dijk 62'	3–2	DFC	Mijnders 41'; In 't Veld 65'	Olympic Stadium	35,000
1943–44	Willem II	Willy Engel; Wim Engel; Van Loon	9–2	Groene Ster (2)	Haas; Klamerek	Sportpark Aalstenweg	
1944–1947	Not played						
1947–48	FC Wageningen	–	0–0 (2–1 p)	DWV (2)	–	Olympic Stadium	20,000
1948–49	Quick 1888	Schipperheijn 11'	1–1 (2–1 p)	Helmondia	Nicholson 12'	Sportpark Aalstenweg	18,000
1949–50	PSV	Bijen 30' 100'; Fransen 43' 87'	4–3 (a.e.t.)	Haarlem	Smit 25'; Pastoor 70'; Roosen 73'	De Kuip	12,000
1950–56	Not played						
1956–57	Fortuna'54	Appel 14' 80' 81'; Angenent 78'	4–2	Feijenoord	Schouten 1'; Aad Bak 42'	De Kuip	35,000
1957–58	Sparta	Bosselaar 8'; Karregat 20' (o.g.); Geel 38'; Verhoeven 69'	4–3	FC Volendam (2)	Smit 18' 70'; Tol 41'	Olympic Stadium	18,000
1958–59	Venlo	Teeuwen 23'; Sleven 32'; Klaassens 56'; Schatorjé 70'	4–1	ADO	Timmer 7'	Zuiderpark	25,000
1959–60	Not played						
1960–61	Ajax	Groot 78' 82' 88'	3–0	NAC	–	De Meer	16,000
1961–62	Sparta	Van Miert 105'	1–0 (a.e.t.)	DHC (2)	–	Het Kasteel	12,000
1962–63	Willem II	Louer 35'; Aarts 46'; Senders 81'	3–0	ADO	–	Zuiderpark	18,000
1963–64	Fortuna'54	–	0–0 (4–3 p)	ADO	–	Philips Stadion	10,000
1964–65	Feijenoord	Bouwmeester 88'	1–0	Go Ahead Eagles	–	De Kuip	31,000
1965–66	Sparta	Madsen 60'	1–0	ADO	–	De Kuip	24,000
1966–67	Ajax	Cruyff 64'; Nuninga 99'	2–1 (a.e.t.)	NAC	Vesters 88'	De Meer	21,000
1967–68	ADO	Schoenmaker 23'; Aarts 28'	2–1	Ajax	Keizer 48'	Zuiderpark	17,500
1968–69	Feijenoord	Wery 27'	1–1 (a.e.t.)	PSV	Radović 71'	De Kuip	55,000
1968–69	Feijenoord	Van Hanegem 47'; Wery 84'	Replay; 2–0	PSV	–	De Kuip	60,000
1969–70	Ajax	Keizer 22'; Cruijff 69'	2–0	PSV	–	De Vliert	30,000
1970–71	Ajax	Cruijff 62' 81'	2–2 (a.e.t.)	Sparta	Kowalik 39'; Visser 74'	De Kuip	63,154
1970–71	Ajax	Mühren 4'; Johan Neeskens 52'	Replay; 2–1	Sparta	Walbeek 47'	De Kuip	60,068
1971–72	Ajax	Cruyff 34'; Mühren 61' (pen.); Keizer 72'	3–2	FC Den Haag	Van Eeden 68'; Mansveld 85' (pen.)	De Kuip	60,000
1972–73	NAC	Bish 10'; Brouwers 75'	2–0	NEC	–	De Kuip	45,801
1973–74	PSV	Deijkers 10'; R. van de Kerkhof 40'; Edström 53'; Van der Kuijlen 51' 58' 90'	6–0	NAC	–	De Kuip	38,000
1974–75	FC Den Haag	Van Leeuwen 67'	1–0	FC Twente	–	De Kuip	21,000
1975–76	PSV	Edström 98'	1–0 (a.e.t.)	Roda JC	–	De Kuip	32,760
1976–77	Twente	Drost 96'; Mühren 105'; Jeuring 110'	3–0 (a.e.t.)	PEC Zwolle (2)	–	De Goffert	26,000
1977–78	AZ '67	Van Rijnsoever 56'	1–0	Ajax	–	Olympic Stadium	38,248
1978–79	Ajax	Clarke 42' (pen.)	1–1 (a.e.t.)	Twente	Meutstege 14' (o.g.)	De Kuip	29,553
1978–79	Ajax	Clarke 27'; Tahamata 47'; Schoenaker 66'	Replay; 3–0	Twente	–	De Kuip	29,274
1979–80	Feyenoord	Petursson 39' (pen.); De Leeuw 71'; Petursson 75'	3–1	Ajax	Arnesen 19'	De Kuip	50,340
1980–81	AZ '67	Tol 24'; Spelbos 59'; Nygaard 74'	3–1	Ajax	Vanenburg 53'	Olympic Stadium	32,591
1981–82	AZ '67	–	0–1	FC Utrecht	Wouters 5'	Galgenwaard	10,000
1981–82	AZ '67	Oberacher 18'; Kist 47' 57' (pen.) 76'; Tol 77'	5–1	FC Utrecht	Carbo 27'	Alkmaarderhout	12,000
1982–83	Ajax	Lerby 47'; Schoenaker 66'; Ophof 86'	3–1	NEC	Mulderij 56'	De Meer	7,700
1982–83	Ajax	Vanenburg 46' 52'; Cruyff 69'	3–1	NEC	Grim 60'	De Goffert	24,000
1983–84	Feyenoord	Houtman 72'	1–0	Fortuna Sittard	–	De Kuip	
1984–85	FC Utrecht	Van Loen 90'	1–0	Helmond Sport (2)	–	Galgenwaard	18,000
1985–86	Ajax	Bosman 46' 80'; Silooy 67'	3–0	RBC (2)	–	De Meer	23,000
1986–87	Ajax	Bosman 11' 83'; Van Basten 104' 106'	4–2 (a.e.t.)	FC Den Haag	Boere 43'; Morley 66'	Zuiderpark	8,600
1987–88	PSV	Gerets 52' 85'; Lerby 90+2'	3–2	Roda JC	H. Smeets 22'; R. Smeets 64'	Willem II Stadion	8,500
1988–89	PSV	Romário 2'; Ellerman 45' 53'; Kieft 79'	4–1	Groningen	Meijer 78'	De Kuip	9,483
1989–90	PSV	Valckx 30' (pen.)	1–0	Vitesse	–	De Kuip	34,000
1990–91	Feyenoord	Witschge 8'	1–0	BVV Den Bosch (2)	–	De Kuip	52,000
1991–92	Feyenoord	de Wolf 28'; Taument 43'; Kiprich 53'	3–0	Roda JC	–	De Kuip	48,000
1992–93	Ajax	Davids 7'; Overmars 45' 89'; Pettersson 71'; Bergkamp 82'; Petersen 87'	6–2	Heerenveen (2)	Regtop 35'; Cămătaru 90'	De Kuip	45,000
1993–94	Feyenoord	Heus 7' (pen.); Van Loen 80'	2–1	NEC (2)	Dekker 90'	De Kuip	43,000
1994–95	Feyenoord	Taument 7'; Obiku 82'	2–1	Volendam	Wasiman 47'	De Kuip	48,146
1995–96	PSV	Cocu 7'; Vink 14'; Veldman 65' (o.g.); Jonk 87'; Van der Doelen 90'	5–2	Sparta	Van der Meer 45'; D. de Nooijer 79' (pen.)	De Kuip	35,000
1996–97	Roda JC	Sibon 4'; Senden 16'; Van der Luer 48'; Schops 56'	4–2	Heerenveen	Korneev 12'; Talan 83'	De Kuip	48,000
1997–98	Ajax	Babangida 25'; Litmanen 38' 61' 84'; Arveladze 79'	5–0	PSV	–	De Kuip	22,500
1998–99	Ajax	Grønkjær 12' 15'	2–0	Fortuna Sittard	–	De Kuip	25,000
1999–2000	Roda JC	Peeters 19'; Van der Luer 89'	2–0	NEC	–	De Kuip	40,000
2000–01	Twente	–	0–0 (a.e.t.) (4–3 p)	PSV	–	De Kuip	45,000
2001–02	Ajax	Mido 21'; Wamberto 90'; Ibrahimović 93'	3–2 (a.e.t.)	FC Utrecht	Gluščević 56' (pen.) 76'	De Kuip	37,000
2002–03	FC Utrecht	de Jong 39'; Gluščević 49' 57'; Kuyt 81'	4–1	Feyenoord	Kalou 73'	De Kuip	45,000
2003–04	FC Utrecht	Van den Bergh 66'	1–0	Twente	–	De Kuip	48,000
2004–05	PSV	Bouma 45'; Cocu 51'; Park 74'; Vennegoor of Hesselink 90'	4–0	Willem II	–	De Kuip	35,000
2005–06	Ajax	Huntelaar 48' 89'	2–1	PSV	Lamey 53'	De Kuip	30,770
2006–07	Ajax	Huntelaar 51'	1–1 (a.e.t.) (8–7 p)	AZ	Dembélé 4'	De Kuip	42,200
2007–08	Feyenoord	Landzaat 8' de Guzmán 36'	2–0	Roda JC	–	De Kuip	51,177
2008–09	Heerenveen	Popov 27'; Kalou 112'	2–2 (a.e.t.) (5–4 p)	Twente	Elia 54'; Hersi 118'	De Kuip	45,000
2009–10	Ajax	de Jong 6' 7'	2–0	Feyenoord	–	Amsterdam Arena	37,283
2009–10	Ajax	Suárez 4' 82' de Jong 64' 77'	4–1	Feyenoord	Tomasson 72'	De Kuip	35,000
2010–11	Twente	Brama 45'; Janssen 56'; Janko 117'	3–2 (a.e.t.)	Ajax	De Zeeuw 18'; Ebecilio 40'	De Kuip	45,000
2011–12	PSV	Toivonen 21'; Mertens 56'; Lens 63'	3–0	Heracles	–	De Kuip	50,000
2012–13	AZ	Maher 12'; Altidore 14'	2–1	PSV	Locadia 31'	De Kuip	50,000
2013–14	PEC Zwolle	Thomas 8' 12'; Fernandez 22' 34'; Van Polen 50'	5–1	Ajax	Van Rhijn 3'	De Kuip	42,500
2014–15	FC Groningen	Rusnák 64' 75'	2–0	PEC Zwolle	–	De Kuip	46,193
2015–16	Feyenoord	Kramer 42'; Elia 75'	2–1	FC Utrecht	Leeuwin 51'	De Kuip	45,592
2016–17	Vitesse	Van Wolfswinkel 81' 88'	2–0	AZ	–	De Kuip	46,105
2017–18	Feyenoord	Jörgensen 28'; Van Persie 57'; Toornstra 90+3'	3–0	AZ	–	De Kuip	46,084
2018–19	Ajax	Blind 38'; Huntelaar 39', 67'; Kristensen 76'	4–0	Willem II	–	De Kuip	45,709
2019–20	Final between Utrecht and Feyenoord not played due to COVID-19 pandemic					De Kuip	N/A
2020–21	Ajax	Gravenberch 23'; Neres 90+1'	2–1	Vitesse	Openda 30'	De Kuip	0
2021–22	PSV	Gutiérrez 48'; Gakpo 50'	2–1	Ajax	Gravenberch 23'	De Kuip	47,500
2022–23	PSV	T. Hazard 67'	1–1 (a.e.t.) (3–2 p)	Ajax	Branthwaite 42' (o.g.)	De Kuip	40,650
2023–24	Feyenoord	Paixão 59'	1–0	NEC	–	De Kuip	42,140
2024–25	Go Ahead Eagles	Deijl 90+9' (pen.)	1–1 (a.e.t.) (4–2 p)	AZ	Parrott 54' (pen.)	De Kuip	42,972
2025–26	AZ	De Wit 32'; Mijnans 67'; Koopmeiners 73'; Smit 90+1'; Parrott 90+5'	5–1	NEC	Ogawa 78'	De Kuip	46,500

=== Number of titles ===
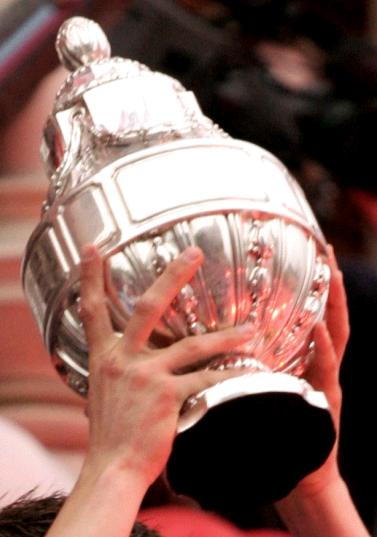
KNVB Cup trophy

Club	Titles	Runners-up	Winning years
Ajax	20	8	1917, 1943, 1961, 1967, 1970, 1971, 1972, 1979, 1983, 1986, 1987, 1993, 1998, 1999, 2002, 2006, 2007, 2010, 2019, 2021
Feyenoord	14	4	1930, 1935, 1965, 1969, 1980, 1984, 1991, 1992, 1994, 1995, 2008, 2016, 2018, 2024
PSV	11	8	1950, 1974, 1976, 1988, 1989, 1990, 1996, 2005, 2012, 2022, 2023
AZ	5	4	1978, 1981, 1982, 2013, 2026
Quick (H)	4	–	1909, 1910, 1911, 1916 (Note: Includes two for second team.)
FC Twente	3	4	1977, 2001, 2011
FC Utrecht	3	3	1985, 2003, 2004
Sparta	3	2	1958, 1962, 1966
HFC	3	–	1904, 1913, 1915
ADO Den Haag	2	6	1968, 1975
HBS Craeyenhout	2	5	1901, 1908 (Note: Includes one for second team.)
Roda JC	2	4	1997, 2000
Haarlem	2	3	1902, 1912
DFC	2	2	1914, 1932
VOC	2	2	1905, 1907
Willem II	2	2	1944, 1963
Fortuna'54	2	–	1957, 1964
Wageningen	2	–	1939, 1948
RCH	2	–	1918, 1928
Vitesse	1	4	2017
PEC Zwolle	1	3	2014
NAC	1	3	1973
HVV	1	3	1903
Heerenveen	1	2	2009
Go Ahead Eagles	1	1	2025
Groningen	1	1	2015
VSV	1	1	1938
VUC Den Haag	1	1	1927
RAP	1	1	1899
Venlo	1	–	1959
Quick 1888	1	–	1949
FC Eindhoven	1	–	1937
Roermond	1	–	1936
Velocitas Groningen	1	–	1934
LONGA	1	–	1926
ZFC	1	–	1925
Schoten	1	–	1921
CVV	1	–	1920
Concordia	1	–	1906
Velocitas Breda	1	–	1900

== Media coverage ==
The broadcast rights are included in the KNVB broadcast rights package, which also includes the Johan Cruyff Shield.

=== Netherlands ===
The KNVB Cup is currently broadcast live by the ESPN channels.

=== International ===
Country/Region	Broadcaster
Albania	SuperSport
Kosovo	SuperSport
Armenia	Setanta Sports
Azerbaijan	Setanta Sports
Georgia	Setanta Sports
Kazakhstan	Setanta Sports
Kyrgyzstan	Setanta Sports
Moldova	Setanta Sports
Tajikistan	Setanta Sports
Turkmenistan	Setanta Sports
Ukraine	Setanta Sports
Uzbekistan	Setanta Sports
Uzbekistan	Salom TV
Argentina	DSports
Chile	DSports
Colombia	DSports
Ecuador	DSports
Peru	DSports
Uruguay	DSports
Venezuela	DSports
Austria	Sportdigital
Germany	Sportdigital
Switzerland	Sportdigital
Bosnia and Herzegovina	Arena Sport
Montenegro	Arena Sport
North Macedonia	Arena Sport
Serbia	Arena Sport
Belgium	Play Sports (Dutch)
Belgium	RTL-TVI (French)
Bulgaria	Ring
Brazil	N Sports
Cambodia	Monomax
Laos	Monomax
Thailand	Monomax
China	ZhiBo8
Croatia	Sport Klub
Cyprus	Cablenet
Estonia	Go3 Sport
Latvia	Go3 Sport
Lithuania	Go3 Sport
Indonesia	RTV
Israel	Charlton
Japan	U-Next
Middle East and North Africa	Dubai Sports
Portugal	DAZN
Slovakia	Arena Sport
Slovenia	Šport TV
Turkey	S Sport
United States	ESPN
