= 2015 KNVB Cup final =

Football match between PEC Zwolle and FC Groningen

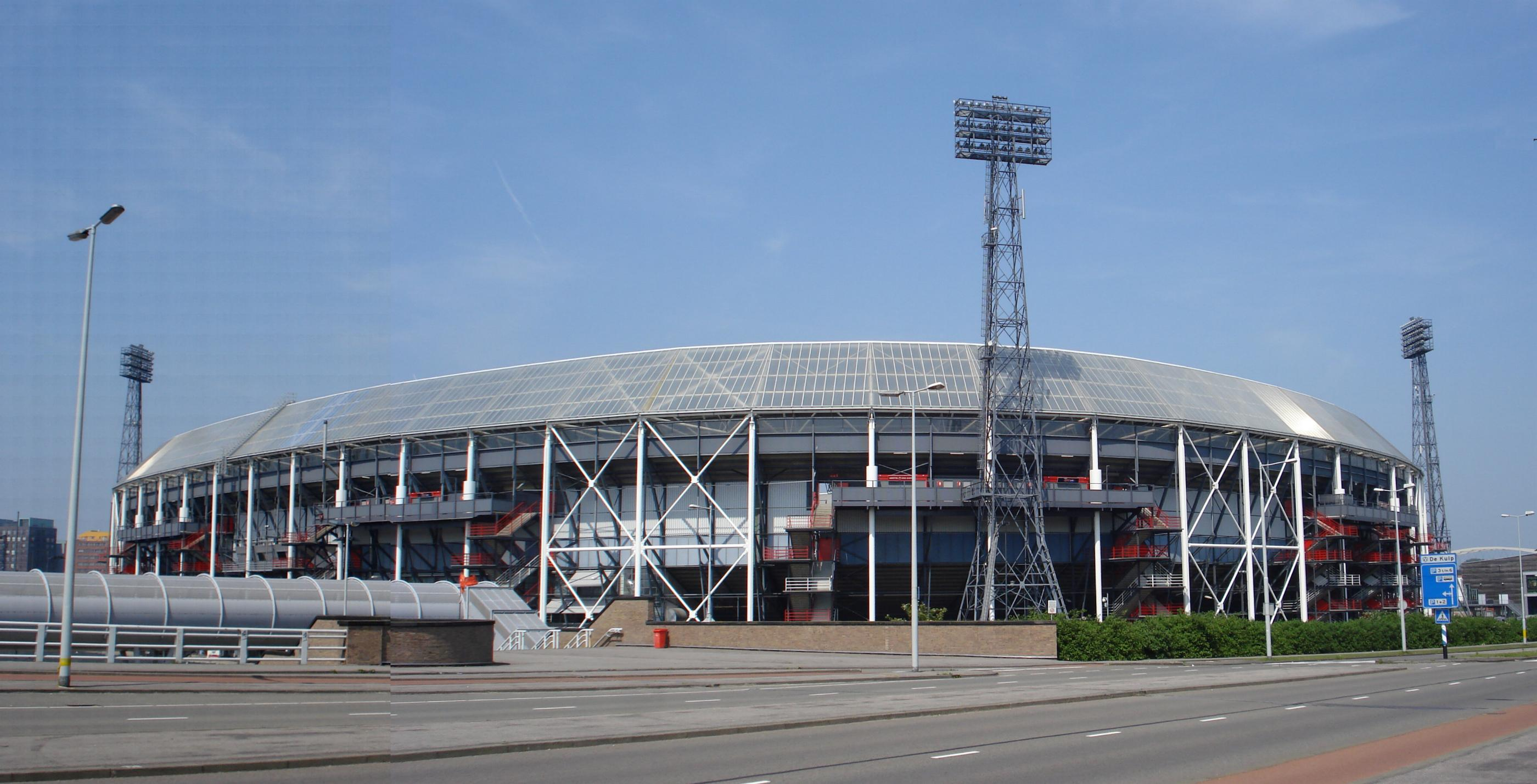
- The final was held at De Kuip (pictured in 2008).
- Event: 2014–15 KNVB Cup final
PEC Zwolle	FC Groningen
0	2
- Date: 3 May 2015
- Venue: De Kuip, Rotterdam
- Referee: Richard Liesveld
- Attendance: 46,193

The 2015 KNVB Cup final was an association football match between PEC Zwolle and FC Groningen on 3 May 2015 at De Kuip, Rotterdam. It was the final match of the 2014–15 KNVB Cup, the 97th edition of the Dutch cup competition, the KNVB Cup.

PEC were appearing in their fourth KNVB Cup final and were the defending champions, having won the trophy for the first time the previous year by defeating Ajax 5–1. Groningen had reached the final of the competition once before, losing to PSV Eindhoven in 1989. PEC and Groningen each entered the competition in the second round and progressed through five rounds to reach the final. PEC won after extra time in the quarter-final, proceeding to the semi-final of the KNVB Cup for the third consecutive year, where they were victorious in a penalty shoot-out to reach the final. After defeating amateur clubs in the second and third rounds, Groningen eliminated three professional sides from the competition by a three-goal difference or more. En route to the final, Groningen scored 22 goals, the most of all teams during the cup season.

PEC were considered the slight favourites to win the final by the bookmakers; the predictions of experts were mixed. Watched by a crowd of 46,193, the first half was goalless as both sides struggled to create scoring chances. In the 64th minute, Albert Rusnák put Groningen 1–0 in front after his shot was deflected off PEC's Joost Broerse into the net. Around ten minutes later, Rusnák netted his second to double Groningen's lead. The assist for the goal came from Jarchinio Antonia, who was substituted on during the second half. Groningen held on to their 2–0 lead to claim the KNVB Cup, the club's first major honour. Maikel Kieftenbeld, the Groningen captain, praised the collective effort from the team. By winning the KNVB Cup, Groningen qualified for the 2015 Johan Cruyff Shield and the 2015–16 UEFA Europa League group stage.

== Route to the final ==
=== PEC Zwolle ===
Round	Opposition	Score
2nd	FC Oss (h)	3–2
3rd	HHC Hardenberg (h)	6–1
4th	VVV-Venlo (a)	1–0
Quarter-final	SC Cambuur (a)	3–2 (a.e.t.)
Semi-final	FC Twente (a)	1–1 (a.e.t.) (4–2 p)
Key: (h) = Home venue; (a) = Away venue; a.e.t. = after extra time; p = penalty shoot-out

As a professional side, defending KNVB Cup champions PEC Zwolle began their campaign for the 2014–15 KNVB Cup in the second round in September 2014. They were drawn against FC Oss of the Eerste Divisie, meeting in Zwolle. PEC narrowly defeated the visitors 3–2 with goals from Jesper Drost (2) and Tomáš Necid. In the third round PEC met local amateur club HHC Hardenberg at IJsseldelta Stadion, PEC's home ground. Van Hezel of HHC headed against the crossbar before PEC midfielder Thomas Lam put the home side 1–0 in front. Lam added two more in the first half to complete a hat-trick. HHC found the back of the PEC net before Thanasis Karagounis put PEC 4–1 up before half-time. In the second half Bart van Hintum added a fifth goal for PEC, scoring from a free-kick, before Ben Rienstra put the ball in the top corner of the HHC goal, with PEC winning the match 6–1. VVV-Venlo were PEC's opponents in the fourth round, meeting in Venlo. Necid put PEC 1–0 ahead early in the first half after converting a cross from Van Hintum. In the closing minutes of the match, VVV had a goal disallowed after Warner Hahn, PEC's goalkeeper, was fouled. PEC held on and progressed to the quarter-final. None of the "Big Three" teams—Ajax, Feyenoord and PSV Eindhoven—reached the quarter-final; it was only the sixth time this had happened since 1956 and the first time since 2008–09.

In the quarter-final, PEC were drawn away against Cambuur, a fellow side from the Eredivisie, the top tier of Dutch football. Lam scored the opening goal with a header, his fourth goal of the cup season. Hahn made a string of saves during the first half to preserve PEC's lead. Early in the second half Ryan Thomas doubled PEC's lead from outside the penalty area, before former PEC player Furdjel Narsingh scored twice in five minutes for Cambuur to bring the score level. The match went to extra time, where Jody Lukoki netted a third goal for the visitors. PEC held on and proceeded to the semi-final of the KNVB Cup for the third consecutive year. The win marked PEC coach Ron Jans's tenth win in ten cup matches while at the club. PEC were paired with Twente in the semi-final, with the match held at Twente's De Grolsch Veste. It was the seventh time the two sides met in the KNVB Cup, with Twente winning all previous meetings, including the 1977 final. Twente had also never lost an official match against PEC at home. Former Twente player Wout Brama put PEC 1–0 ahead in the 82nd minute before Twente equalised five minutes later. The game went to extra time, where neither side scored. PEC won the penalty shoot-out 4–2 with Czech forward Necid scoring the winner with a Panenka penalty kick.

=== FC Groningen ===
Round	Opposition	Score
2nd	BVV Barendrecht (a)	4–1
3rd	Flevo Boys (a)	8–1
4th	FC Volendam (h)	3–0
Quarter-final	SBV Vitesse (h)	4–0
Semi-final	Excelsior Rotterdam (h)	3–0
Key: (h) = Home venue; (a) = Away venue

Groningen also entered the 2014–15 KNVB Cup in the second round, where they faced amateur club Barendrecht. The game was played in Barendrecht; Groningen won 4–1 with goals from Danny Hoesen, Michael de Leeuw, Nick van der Velden and Jarchinio Antonia. Groningen were again drawn against an amateur club in the following round, meeting Flevo Boys away. Groningen proceeded to the fourth round with an 8–1 victory, with Hoesen, Yoëll van Nieff, De Leeuw (4), Dino Islamović and Johan Kappelhof scoring. De Leeuw scored a hat-trick in five minutes, and Groningen recorded their tied-biggest away win in the club's history. In the fourth round they were drawn against Eerste Divisie side Volendam, with the match held at Euroborg, Groningen's home ground. Mimoun Mahi put Groningen 1–0 ahead shortly before half-time, Van der Velden converted a penalty kick halfway through the second half and De Leeuw scored Groningen's third shortly before full-time. The club proceeded to the quarter-final with a 3–0 victory.

Groningen faced fellow Eredivisie side Vitesse at home in the quarter-final. The visitors dominated during the first hour, but it remained goalless. Around the 60th minute, De Leeuw's header was saved by Vitesse defender Guram Kashia on the goalline, using his hand. Kashia was sent off, and Groningen were awarded a penalty kick. De Leeuw's shot was saved but Tjaronn Chery scored from the rebound. De Leeuw doubled the score five minutes later before Van Nieff added a third for Groningen; he passed two Vitesse defenders and put the ball in the top corner. Maikel Kieftenbeld scored the fourth goal with a volley. Groningen defeated Vitesse 4–0 and progressed to the semi-final of the competition for the first time since 1988–89. Played at Euroborg before a sold-out crowd, Groningen hosted Eredivisie club Excelsior, who made their first appearance in a KNVB Cup semi-final since 1977–78. Groningen were without De Leeuw, who was ill, and Eric Botteghin, who was suspended. Excelsior were the better side during the opening stages of the game, but it remained goalless. Hans Hateboer, Groningen's right-back and Botteghin's replacement, put the home side 1–0 ahead after 40 minutes. Albert Rusnák added a second goal early in the second half before Chery netted Groningen's third in the 88th minute, with the team advancing to the final with a 3–0 victory.

== Pre-match ==
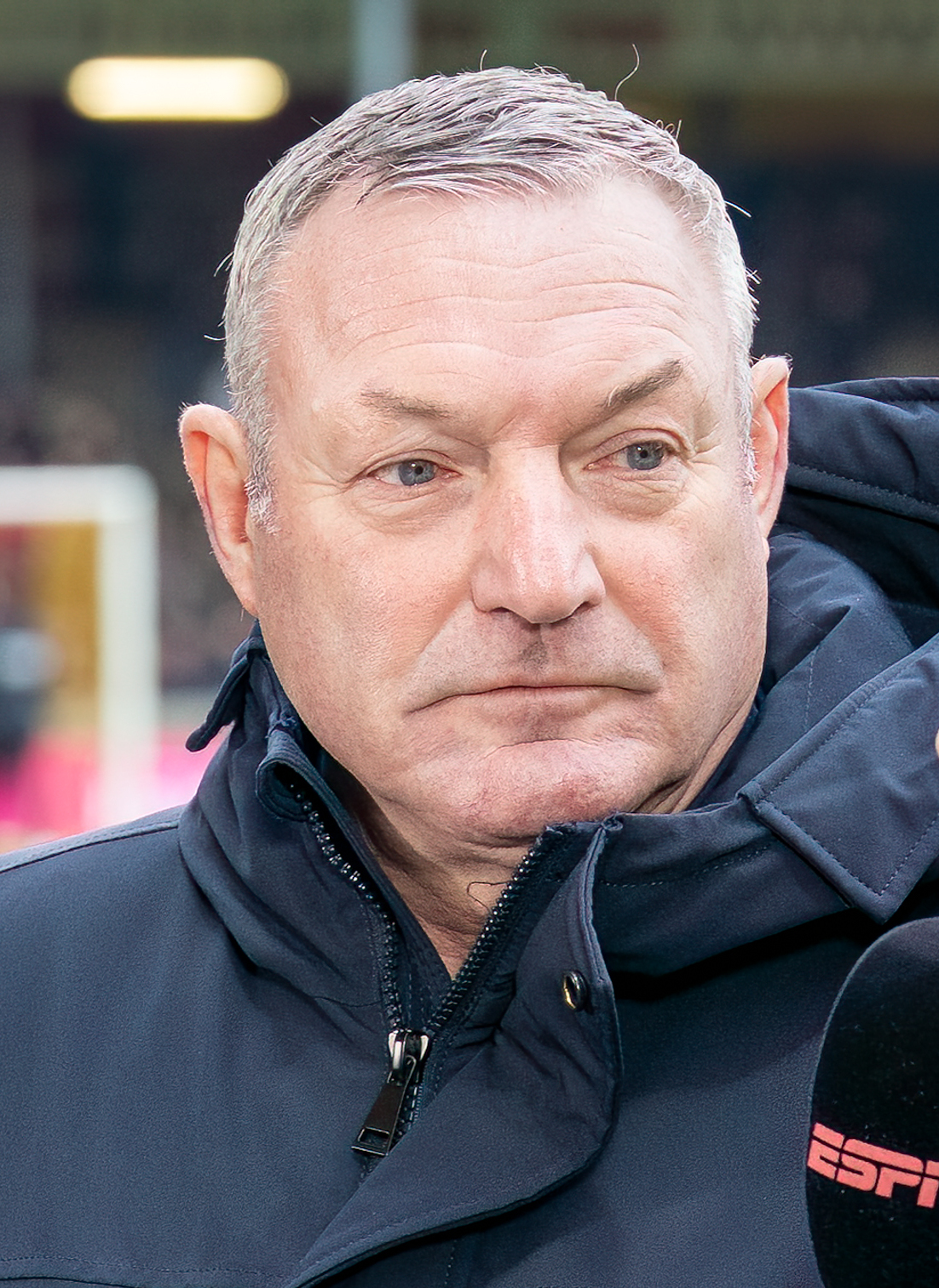
PEC's Ron Jans (pictured in 2023) coached Groningen from 2002 to 2010.

PEC, founded in 1910, were appearing in the KNVB Cup final for the second consecutive year and for the fourth time in their history. They lost the 1928 final against Racing Club Haarlem and were runners-up in the 1977 final against Twente. PEC won the KNVB Cup for the first time in 2014, defeating Ajax 5–1; it was the club's first major trophy. Jans, the PEC coach, showed his squad video messages from their family members before the match against Ajax; he was hailed as a "motivator" by Dutch newspaper Dagblad van het Noorden. Groningen, founded in 1971, had reached the final once before, losing 4–1 to PSV in 1989; PSV's Romário scored after two minutes, the fastest goal in KNVB Cup final history. The 2015 final marked the third meeting between PEC and Groningen in a KNVB Cup match; in 1981, PEC won 3–2 at home with Jans playing for PEC, and in 2001, Groningen recorded a 3–0 victory with goals from Martin Drent, Joost Broerse and Arjen Robben. PEC and Groningen, both described by the Nederlandse Omroep Stichting as "provincial clubs", had played each other once in the Eredivisie during the season to date, with PEC winning 2–0 at home; their second league meeting was to be held a week after the KNVB Cup final. Both sides were in the top half of the league table, with PEC one place and four points ahead of Groningen after 32 matches.

Several figures had ties to both clubs. Broerse started his career at Groningen but had played for PEC since 2012. Another PEC player who started his career at Groningen was Stef Nijland. His father, Hans, had been Groningen's chief executive officer since the 1990s. Jans played for Groningen and later coached the club from 2002 to 2010. Jans stated after the draw for the semi-finals that he hoped to meet Groningen in the final. Botteghin, the Groningen defender, played for PEC from 2007 until 2011. Several days before the final the coaches and captains of Groningen and PEC attended the mandatory press conference in Zeist. Jans and Groningen coach Erwin van de Looi also posed with the cup but Van de Looi did not want to touch the trophy.

PEC were considered the slight favourites: bookmaker William Hill offered odds of 7/5 on a PEC win and 17/10 on a Groningen victory. PEC were also considered the slight favourites at Ladbrokes, bwin and Unibet. The experts' predictions were mixed. Fox Sports analyst Arnold Bruggink suggested that PEC had a stronger squad and had gained experience playing a final the previous year, making them the favourites. Hugo Borst, presenter at the Nederlandse Omroep Stichting, predicted a Groningen victory as they were "hungrier" for success. Former footballer Marco van der Heide, writing in Friesch Dagblad, considered Necid and Drost key players for PEC, while Chery and Botteghin were deemed the most important players for Groningen. Drost had scored eight goals and registered seven assists during the Eredivisie season to date; Chery had fourteen goals and five assists. Van der Heide described PEC's style as "clean positional play"; he stated that Van de Looi's style of play was "less idealistic", with his tactics depending on which players were available. Groningen had scored 22 goals during the KNVB Cup season, more than any other team. De Leeuw scored seven and was one goal behind Arkadiusz Milik of Ajax, the season's top scorer in the competition.

The final, the 97th in the competition's history, was held at De Kuip in Rotterdam, venue of the KNVB Cup final since 1989. Each club took 18,000 fans to De Kuip, transported by around 500 buses in total. As PEC were regarded as the home team, they wore their first-choice kit and were awarded the home dressing room. PEC's Maikel van der Werff was suspended for the final, while Karagounis was injured. Groningen's only absentee was Nick Bakker, who missed the match due to injury. Just before heading for Rotterdam, Van de Looi surprised his squad with a lunch with their family members; he concluded it strengthened the "feeling of invincibility" within the team.

== Match ==
=== Summary ===
PEC kicked off the match at 6 p.m. CEST, refereed by Richard Liesveld, who took charge of his first KNVB Cup final. Within the first minute, a dangerous shot by De Leeuw was blocked by Broerse. PEC goalkeeper Hahn almost punched the ball from the resulting corner kick in his own goal. In the 8th minute, Lukoki hit a powerful shot from the edge of the penalty area, but Groningen defender Rasmus Lindgren blocked the effort. Two minutes later, Lukoki crossed the ball, but Necid's header was blocked by Botteghin. Lindgren fouled Necid shortly afterwards, with the resulting free kick headed away by Mahi. The game ebbed back and forth within the first 15 minutes; shortly afterwards, both sides became cautious of potential counter-attacks, resulting in both creating fewer goalscoring chances. Early in the match, the RTV Noord coverage suggested that "PEC seemed less nervous than Groningen". Around the 30th minute, Chery dribbled through the PEC defence but could not find a shot. Seven minutes later, Lukoki dribbled past several Groningen players, putting his shot just wide of the goal. The first half remained goalless. At half-time, Van de Looi replaced Lorenzo Burnet, who had struggled against Lukoki, with Hateboer. Kappelhof moved to left-back with Hateboer taking the right-back position.

In the 50th minute, Mahi headed the ball to De Leeuw, who saw his shot saved by the legs of Hahn. Drost went down in Groningen's penalty area five minutes later, but the referee waved away the penalty claims. Thomas hit a powerful shot in PEC's following attack, but it was saved by Sergio Padt. In the 62nd minute, Mahi was substituted off and replaced by Antonia. Two minutes later, Antonia's cross was deflected off a PEC defender; the ball fell to Rusnák, whose shot from the edge of the penalty area was deflected off Broerse's leg into PEC's goal, putting Groningen 1–0 in front. Jans had already wanted to substitute off Broerse before Rusnák scored; Broerse was eventually replaced by Trent Sainsbury. Antonia put in another dangerous cross shortly afterwards, but Sainsbury cleared the ball. In the 75th minute, Antonia's cross found Rusnák, who put the ball in the far corner of the PEC goal, scoring his second goal and putting Groningen 2–0 ahead. Nine minutes later, Padt saved a well-placed shot from the edge of the penalty area from Nijland. In stoppage time, Antonia crossed the ball to Juninho Bacuna, who miskicked it while in the opponent's penalty area. PEC's Nijland had a goal disallowed a minute later, having been offside. Groningen held on to their 2–0 lead to claim the KNVB Cup. PEC received white bathrobes as the runners-up and Groningen red ones as the victors. Kieftenbeld, the winning captain, was handed the trophy by former Groningen player Erwin Koeman.

=== Details ===
3 May 2015
18:00 CEST

PEC Zwolle	0–2	FC Groningen
		Rusnák 64', 75'

De Kuip, Rotterdam
Attendance: 46,193
Referee: Richard Liesveld

PEC Zwolle	FC Groningen

GK	(Netherlands) Warner Hahn
RB	(Netherlands) Bram van Polen (c)
CB	(Finland) Thomas Lam	(substituted off) 81'
CB	(Netherlands) Joost Broerse	(substituted off) 65'
LB	(Netherlands) Bart van Hintum
CM	(Netherlands) Ben Rienstra
CM	(Netherlands) Mustafa Saymak
AM	(Netherlands) Jesper Drost
RW	(Democratic Republic of the Congo) Jody Lukoki
ST	(Czech Republic) Tomáš Necid
LW	(New Zealand) Ryan Thomas	(substituted off) 81'
Substitutes:
CB	(Australia) Trent Sainsbury	(substituted on) 65'
LW	(Netherlands) Sheraldo Becker	(substituted on) 81'
ST	(Netherlands) Stef Nijland	(substituted on) 81'
Coach:
(Netherlands) Ron Jans

GK	(Netherlands) Sergio Padt
RB	(Netherlands) Johan Kappelhof
CB	(Brazil) Eric Botteghin
CB	(Sweden) Rasmus Lindgren
LB	(Netherlands) Lorenzo Burnet	(substituted off) 46'
CM	(Netherlands) Maikel Kieftenbeld (c)
CM	(Sweden) Simon Tibbling
AM	(Netherlands) Tjaronn Chery
RW	(Netherlands) Mimoun Mahi	(substituted off) 62'
ST	(Netherlands) Michael de Leeuw	(substituted off) 86'
LW	(Slovakia) Albert Rusnák
Substitutes:
RB	(Netherlands) Hans Hateboer	(substituted on) 46'
RW	(Netherlands) Jarchinio Antonia	(substituted on) 62'
ST	(Netherlands) Juninho Bacuna	(substituted on) 86'
Coach:
(Netherlands) Erwin van de Looi

== Post-match and aftermath ==
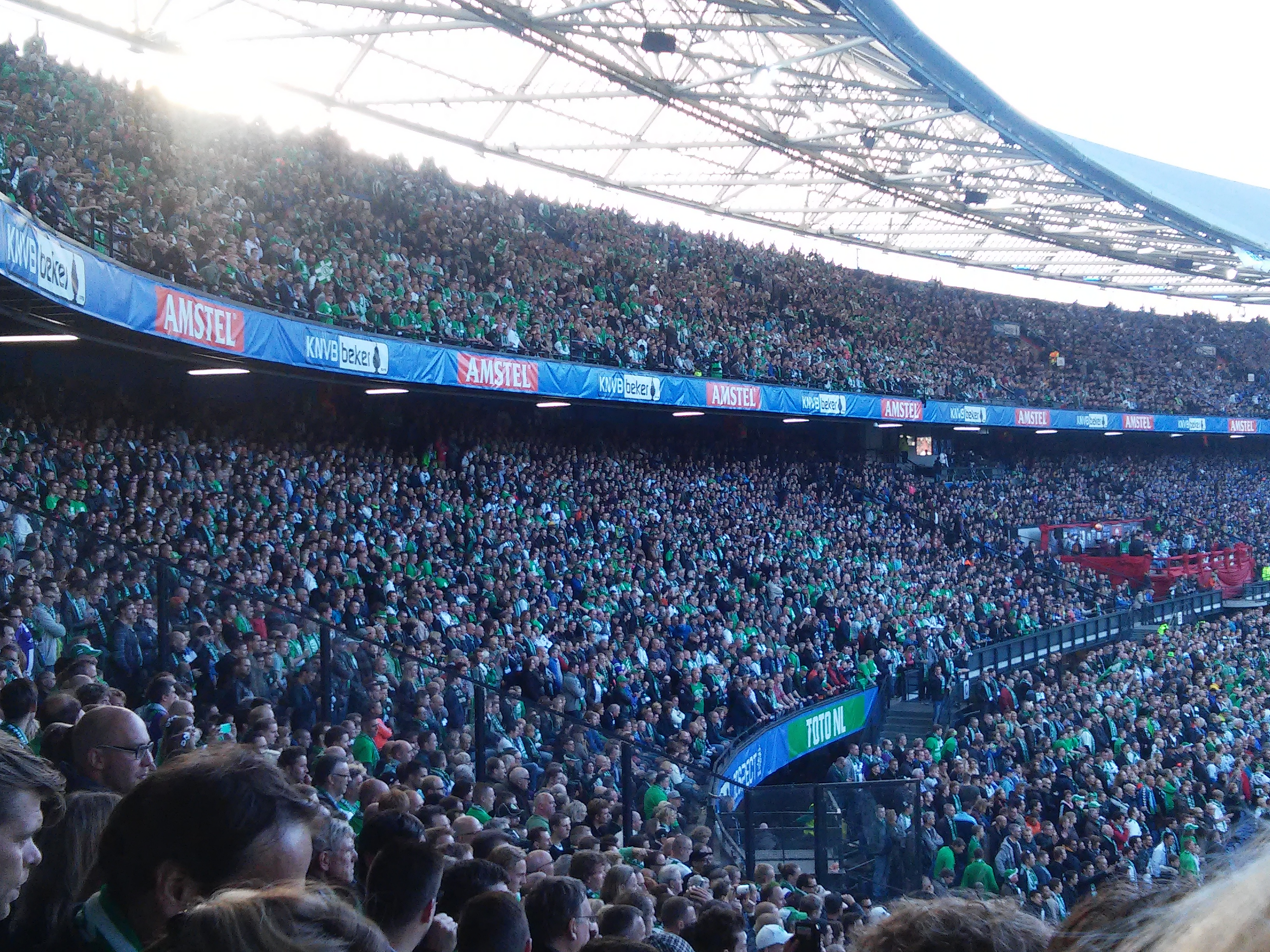
Groningen fans during the final

The 2014–15 KNVB Cup was Groningen's first major honour. They became the third Groningen-based team to win a major honour, after Be Quick won the 1919–20 Dutch League Championship and Velocitas 1897 claimed the 1933–34 KNVB Cup. By winning the cup, Groningen qualified for the 2015–16 UEFA Europa League group stage and the 2015 Johan Cruyff Shield.

Kieftenbeld was delighted, stating that he had "now touched the cup for the first time". He also praised the collective effort from the team. Van de Looi was pleased for the fans that the team had claimed the club's first major honour. He added that they remained confident during the match, stating that "during half-time we said we are not playing well, but we will win". Van de Looi was also delighted with the impact of the substitutions, such as from the pacey Antonia. PEC coach Jans was disappointed, claiming that "both teams were evenly matched, but we gave away too much space in the second half. After the 1–0 it was Groningen's game." Jans named Groningen the deserved winners. The following day the front page of Dagblad van het Noorden was titled "We hebben hem!" (lit. 'We got it!') in large white letters and included an image of the team lifting the trophy. For the only time the title of the newspaper was coloured in green, the colours of FC Groningen, instead of the newspaper's usual blue.

The final, broadcast on Fox Sports, was watched by almost 1.9 million people, making it the most viewed programme of Sunday evening in the Netherlands. At least 10,000 Groningen fans watched the game on Grote Markt in the centre of the city. Three days after the final the Groningen squad were celebrated in Stadspark by around 30,000 fans, preceded by an open-bus parade which took the team from Euroborg through the city centre to Stadspark. A week after the final Groningen and PEC met again in a league match at Euroborg: PEC won 1–0 with a goal from Necid halfway through the second half.

Matchwinner Rusnák later tattooed the date of the Cup final in Roman numerals on his leg. In 2022, a 40 by 5 metres (43.7 yd × 5.5 yd) concrete mural of Kieftenbeld lifting the KNVB Cup was created under a viaduct near Euroborg.
