= Football records and statistics in the Netherlands =

Football records and statistics in the Netherlands lists the number of championship wins by association football club across various leagues, and different levels of competition, in the Netherlands. It also lists vital statistics and records across these leagues.

== Most successful clubs by titles ==
As of 2 August 2026

No	Team	Domestic				Worldwide						Total
No	Team	League Championship	KNVB Cup	Johan Cruyff Shield	Total	Champions League	Cup Winners' Cup	Europa League	Super Cup	Intercontinental Cup	Total	Total
1	Ajax	36	20	9	65	4	1	1	2	2	10	75
2	PSV	27	11	15	53	1	-	1	-	-	2	55
3	Feyenoord	16	14	5	35	1	-	2	-	1	4	39
4	HVV	10	1	-	11	-	-	-	-	-	0	11
5	Sparta Rotterdam	6	3	-	9	-	-	-	-	-	0	9
6	AZ	2	5	2	9	-	-	-	-	-	0	9
7	RAP	5	1	-	6	-	-	-	-	-	0	6
8	Koninklijke HFC	3	3	-	6	-	-	-	-	-	0	6
9	FC Twente	1	3	2	6	-	-	-	-	-	0	6
10	Go Ahead Eagles	4	1	-	5	-	-	-	-	-	0	5
11	HBS	3	2	-	5	-	-	-	-	-	0	5
12	Willem II	3	2	-	5	-	-	-	-	-	0	5
13	Quick	1	4	-	5	-	-	-	-	-	0	5
14	ADO Den Haag	2	2	-	4	-	-	-	-	-	0	4
15	RCH	2	2	-	4	-	-	-	-	-	0	4
16	FC Utrecht	-	3	1	4	-	-	-	-	-	0	4
17	HFC Haarlem	1	2	-	3	-	-	-	-	-	0	3
18	Heracles Almelo	2	-	-	2	-	-	-	-	-	0	2
19	FC Eindhoven	1	1	-	2	-	-	-	-	-	0	2
20	NAC	1	1	-	2	-	-	-	-	-	0	2
21	SVV	1	-	1	2	-	-	-	-	-	0	2
22	DFC	-	2	-	2	-	-	-	-	-	0	2
23	Fortuna Sittard	-	2	-	2	-	-	-	-	-	0	2
24	Roda JC	-	2	-	2	-	-	-	-	-	0	2
25	VOC	-	2	-	2	-	-	-	-	-	0	2
26	WVV Wageningen	-	2	-	2	-	-	-	-	-	0	2
27	PEC Zwolle	-	1	1	2	-	-	-	-	-	0	2
28	Be Quick	1	-	-	1	-	-	-	-	-	0	1
29	BVV	1	-	-	1	-	-	-	-	-	0	1
30	De Volewijckers	1	-	-	1	-	-	-	-	-	0	1
31	DOS	1	-	-	1	-	-	-	-	-	0	1
32	DWS	1	-	-	1	-	-	-	-	-	0	1
33	Limburgia	1	-	-	1	-	-	-	-	-	0	1
34	Rapid JC	1	-	-	1	-	-	-	-	-	0	1
35	RC & FC Concordia	1	-	-	1	-	-	-	-	-	0	1
36	SC Enschede	1	-	-	1	-	-	-	-	-	0	1
37	CVV	-	1	-	1	-	-	-	-	-	0	1
38	DSV Concordia	-	1	-	1	-	-	-	-	-	0	1
39	FC Groningen	-	1	-	1	-	-	-	-	-	0	1
40	Quick 1888	-	1	-	1	-	-	-	-	-	0	1
41	RFC Roermond	-	1	-	1	-	-	-	-	-	0	1
42	sc Heerenveen	-	1	-	1	-	-	-	-	-	0	1
43	T.S.V. LONGA	-	1	-	1	-	-	-	-	-	0	1
44	Velocitas 1897	-	1	-	1	-	-	-	-	-	0	1
45	Vitesse	-	1	-	1	-	-	-	-	-	0	1
46	VSV	-	1	-	1	-	-	-	-	-	0	1
47	VUC	-	1	-	1	-	-	-	-	-	0	1
48	VV Schoten	-	1	-	1	-	-	-	-	-	0	1
49	VVV-Venlo	-	1	-	1	-	-	-	-	-	0	1
50	ZFC	-	1	-	1	-	-	-	-	-	0	1

== League ==
=== Titles ===
- Most League titles: 36 (28 professional era), Ajax
- Most consecutive League titles: 4, joint record:
  - Professional era
    - PSV (1985/86, 86/87, 87/88, 88/89) and (2004/05, 05/06, 06/07, 07/08)
    - Ajax (2010/11, 11/12, 12/13, 13/14)
  - Amateur era
    - HVV Den Haag (1899/1900, 00/01, 01/02, 02/03)

=== Wins ===
- Most wins : 1520 Ajax
- Most wins in a season: 30 Ajax 1971-72, 1972-73
- Most consecutive wins: 17 PSV 1987-88, 2023-24
- Most consecutive wins at home: 19 FC Twente 2009-10
- Most consecutive wins away: 16 PSV 15 March 2025 - 8 February 2026
- Most consecutive wins away in a season: 11 PSV Eindhoven 1985-86, 2025-26*
- Least wins in a season: 1 RBC Roosendaal 2005-06
- Most consecutive games without a win: 25 FC Dordrecht 1994-95, RBC Roosendaal 2005-06

=== Draws ===
- Most draws : 593 FC Twente
- Most draws in a season: 18 FC Twente 1988-89
- Most consecutive draws: 7 FC Groningen 1983-84
- Most consecutive draws at home: 6 NEC Nijmegen 1980-81
- Most consecutive draws away: 6 FC Twente 1989-90
- Least draws in a season: 0 Ajax 1971-72

=== Losses ===
- Most losses: 850 FC Utrecht
- Most losses in a season : 29 RKC Waalwijk 2009-10
- Most losses in a season at home : 13 RKC Waalwijk 2009-10
- Most losses in a season away : 15 Willem II 2009-10
- Most consecutive losses: 13 FC Dordrecht 1994-95
- Most consecutive losses at home: 9 De Graafschap 2011-12
- Most consecutive losses away: 11 Willem II 2009-10, 2021-22
- Least losses in a season: 0 Ajax 1994-95

=== Points ===
- Most points: 4972 Ajax
- Most points in a season : 93 Ajax 1971-72 (converted from a previously 2 points per win system; 63)
- Least points in a season : 9 RBC Roosendaal 2005-06

=== Goals ===
- Most goals: 5814 Ajax
- Most goals scored in a season : 120 Ajax 1985-86
- Most goals conceded in a season:102 FC Volendam 1997-98
- Most games scored in a single season: 34 PSV Eindhoven 2023-24

== Cup ==
=== Titles ===
- Most Cup titles: 20, Ajax
- Most consecutive Cup titles: 3, joint record:
  - Ajax (1969/70, 70/71, 71/72)
  - PSV (1987/88, 88/89, 89/90)

== See also ==
- List of football clubs by competitive honours won
