= Vermetten =

Vermetten is a surname. Notable people with the surname include:

- Henk Vermetten (1895–1964), Dutch footballer
- Jean-Pierre Vermetten (1895–1977), Belgian athlete
