= 1982–83 KNVB Cup =

Tournament details
- Country: Netherlands
- Teams: 63

Final positions
- Champions: Ajax
- Runners-up: NEC

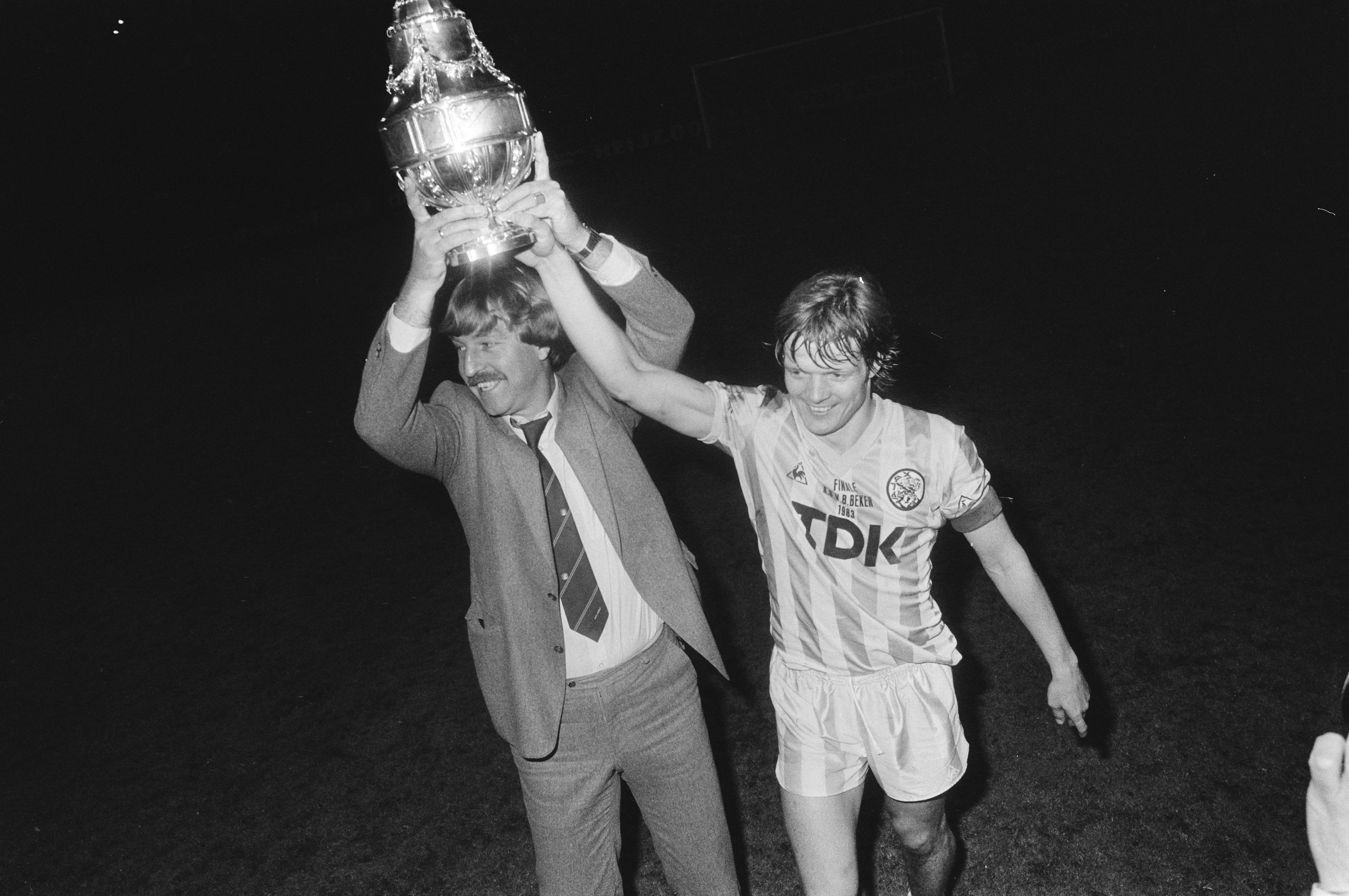
KNVB Cup Final match NEC against Ajax 1-3, Aad de Mos and Sören Lerby (r) with the cup, May 17, 1983, Gelderland, Nijmegen

The 65th edition of the KNVB Cup edition of the Dutch national football annual knockout tournament for the KNVB Cup. 46 teams contested, beginning on 4 September 1982 and ending with the two legs of the final on 10 and 17 May 1983.

Ajax defeating NEC 3–1 on both occasions and won the cup for the ninth time.

From the quarter finals onwards, two-legged matches were held. If two teams drew both matches, or if they both won one, extra time was played right after the second match, no matter what the aggregate score was.

== Teams ==
- All 18 participants of the 1982–83 Eredivisie, fifteen of which entering in the second round, the other three entering in the first round
- All 17 participants of the 1982–83 Eerste Divisie, entering in the first round
- 28 teams from lower (amateur) leagues, entering in the preliminary round

== Preliminary round ==
The matches of the preliminary round were played on 4-5 September 1982. Only amateur clubs participated.

Home team	Result	Away team
TSV LONGA	(p) 0-0	VV Caesar
VV OWIOS	0–2	ACV
RCH	1–3	IJsselmeervogels
VV Rheden	0–2	DETO
RKC	1–4 (aet)	ROHDA Raalte
Rijnsburgse Boys	4–1	VV TSC
Zwolsche Boys	1–1 (p)	DWV

Home team	Result	Away team
VV Bennekom	2–1	SSS
DHC Delft	0–2	VV RCL
VV DOVO	3–0	RBC
VV Drachten	1–2	USV Elinkwijk
VV Dubbeldam	1–3	NSVV
FC Emmen	2–0	RKVV Zwaagdijk
SV Heerlen	2–3	VV WKE

== First round ==
The matches of the first round were played on October 9 and 10, 1982. Twenty professional clubs entered the tournament here.

Home team	Result	Away team
TSV LONGA	3–1 (aet)	SC Heracles _{1}
MVV _{1}	0–1	De Graafschap _{1}
SC Amersfoort _{1}	1–3	SC Veendam _{1}
SC Cambuur _{1}	4–2	NSVV
sc Heerenveen _{1}	1–0	VV Bennekom
Telstar _{1}	1–0	FC Den Bosch _{1}
Vitesse Arnhem _{1}	6–1	VV WKE
FC Wageningen _{1}	2–1 (aet)	USV Elinkwijk

Home team	Result	Away team
ACV	2–6	FC Volendam _{1}
DETO	1–0	DS '79 _{1}
VV DOVO	2–3	Helmond Sport _{E}
DWS	1–0	FC Eindhoven _{1}
FC Emmen	3–2	SVV _{1}
Excelsior _{E}	2–0	Rijnsburgse Boys
FC Den Haag _{1}	3–0	VV RCL
FC VVV _{1}	4–0	ROHDA Raalte
IJsselmeervogels	2–4	Fortuna Sittard _{E}

_{E} Eredivisie; _{1} Eerste Divisie

== Second round ==
The matches of the second round were played on November 13 and 14, 1982. Fifteen Eredivisie clubs entered the tournament here.

Home team	Result	Away team
HFC Haarlem _{E}	4–1	Fortuna Sittard
Helmond Sport	(p) 4-4	FC Utrecht _{E}
TSV LONGA	1–4	Roda JC _{E}
NAC _{E}	0–3	Ajax _{E}
NEC _{E}	3–0	SC Cambuur
Telstar	2–2 (p)	Go Ahead Eagles _{E}
FC Wageningen	2–1	Vitesse Arnhem
Willem II _{E}	1–2	SC Veendam

Home team	Result	Away team
AZ'67 _{E}	2–3	FC Volendam
DETO	2–3	De Graafschap
FC Emmen	1–7	PSV _{E}
Excelsior	3–5	FC Groningen _{E}
FC Den Haag	(p) 3-3	DWS
FC Twente _{E}	2–0	PEC Zwolle _{E}
FC VVV	(p) 2-2	Sparta _{E}
Feyenoord _{E}	4–1	sc Heerenveen

_{E} 15 Eredivisie entrants

== Round of 16 ==
The matches of the round of 16 were played on January 8 and January 9, 1983.

Home team	Result	Away team
Ajax	3–2	FC Den Haag
FC Groningen	2–0	Feyenoord
FC VVV	0–3	PSV
Go Ahead Eagles	4–1	FC Volendam
HFC Haarlem	6–1	FC Twente
Helmond Sport	2–3 (aet)	Roda JC
NEC	2–0	De Graafschap
FC Wageningen	3–1	SC Veendam

== Quarter finals ==
The quarter finals were played on February 23 and March 9, 1983. Two-legged matches were played from this point on. When both teams won once, or drew twice, extra time (and if necessary a penalty shootout) was held no matter what the aggregate score was.

Team 1	Match 1	Match 2	Team 2
Ajax	2–0	3–1	Roda JC
HFC Haarlem	4–0	1–1	Go Ahead Eagles
PSV	2–0	(p) 0-2	FC Groningen
FC Wageningen	3–1	1–2 (p)	NEC

== Semi-finals ==
The semi-finals were played on March 30 and April 13, 1983.

Team 1	Match 1	Match 2	Team 2
Ajax	2–0	(p) 1-3	PSV
HFC Haarlem	2–2	0–0 (p)	NEC

== Final ==
10 May 1983

Ajax	3–1	NEC
Lerby 49'; Schoenaker 66'; Ophof 86'		Mulderij 54'

De Meer Stadion, Amsterdam
Attendance: 7,700
Referee: Henk Weerink

17 May 1983

NEC	1–3	Ajax
Grim 59' (pen.)		Vanenburg 46', 52'; Cruijff 71'

Goffertstadion, Nijmegen
Attendance: 24,000
Referee: Jan Keizer

Ajax also won the Dutch Eredivisie championship, thereby taking the double. They would participate in the European Cup, so finalists NEC could play in the Cup Winners' Cup.
