= Harry Dénis =

Dutch footballer

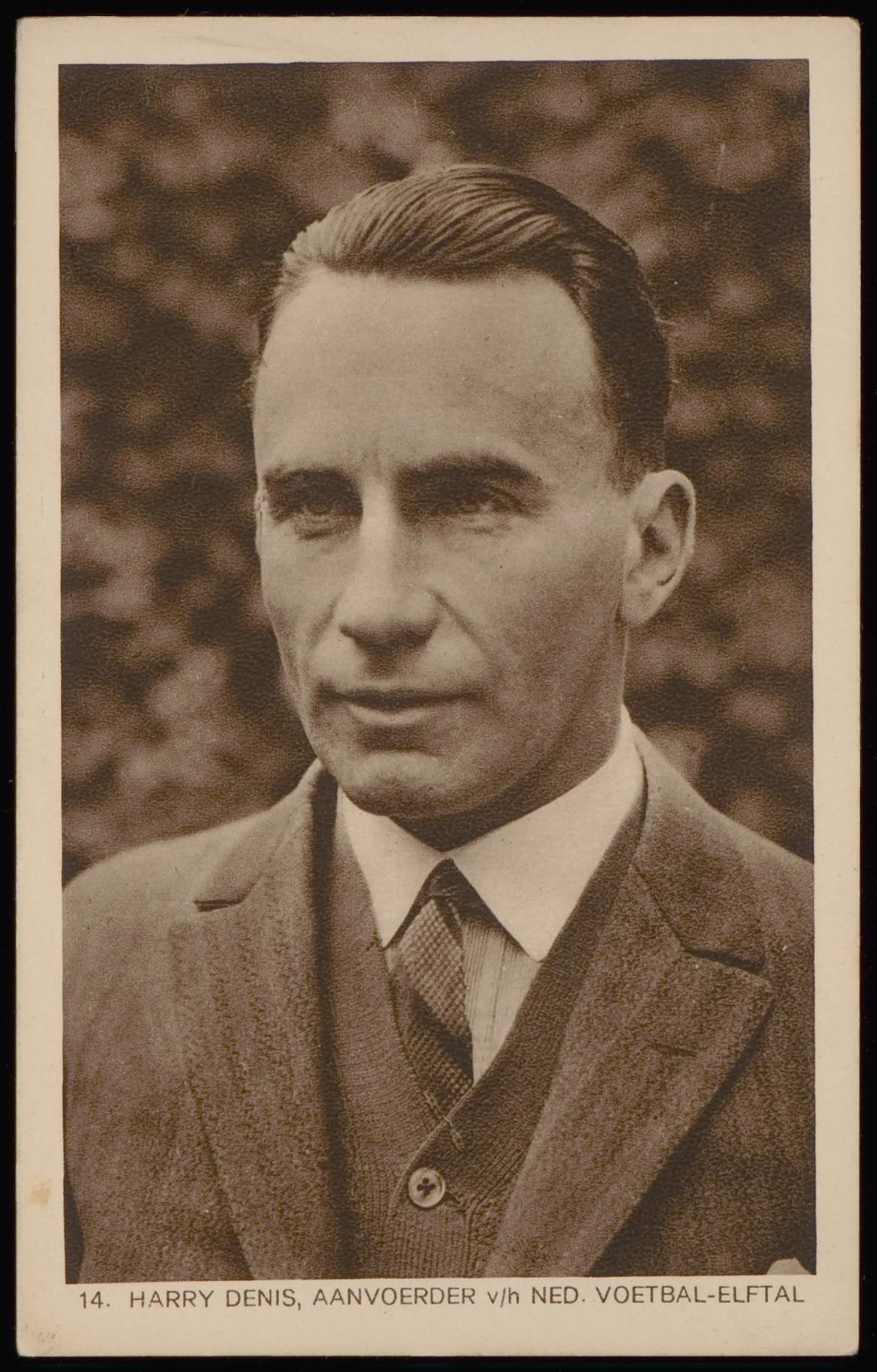
- Harry Dénis (1928)

Personal information
- Full name: Henri "Harry" Léonard Barthélémi Dénis
- Date of birth: 28 August 1896
- Place of birth: The Hague, Netherlands
- Date of death: 13 July 1971 (aged 74)
- Place of death: The Hague, Netherlands
- Position: Rightback

Youth career
- 1904–1907: DVV
- 1907–1911: HBS

Senior career*
Years	Team	Apps	(Gls)
1911–1934	HBS	298	(16)

International career
1919–1930	Netherlands	56	(0)
- * Club domestic league appearances and goals

Olympic medal record

Men's football
Bronze medal – third place	1920 Antwerp	Team competition

Henri ("Harry") Léonard Barthélémi Dénis (28 August 1896 – 13 July 1971) was a football defender from the Netherlands, who represented his home country at three consecutive Summer Olympics, starting in 1920.

He was a civil engineer by profession and grew up in Batavia while his father was serving as an officer in the Dutch army there.

== Club career ==
Dénis started playing football with local side DVV and joined HBS aged 11. He would stay at the club for the rest of his career, winning the 1925 Netherlands Football League Championship with them.

== International career ==
At his Olympic debut in Antwerp, Belgium he won the bronze medal with the Netherlands national football team, followed by a fourth place four years later in Paris, France. Dénis obtained a total number of 56 caps for the Netherlands, in which he was captain in 37 matches. He was one of the most prominent Dutch footballers in the 1920s. Dénis delivered the Olympic Oath during the opening ceremony of the 1928 Summer Olympics in Amsterdam.

Dénis held the Dutch caps record from 3 May 1925 (when he equaled the total of Bok de Korver) until 2 May 1937 (when his total was surpassed by Puck van Heel).
