= 1901–02 KNVB Cup =

Tournament details
- Country: The Netherlands
- Dates: 3 November 1901 – 8 May 1902
- Teams: 20

Final positions
- Champions: HFC Haarlem (1st title)
- Runner-up: HBS Craeyenhout

Tournament statistics
- Matches played: 40
- Goals scored: 193 (4.83 per match)

The 1901–02 KNVB Cup was the 4th staging of the KNVB Cup. The cup was won by HFC Haarlem, beating HBS Craeyenhout 2–1 in the final.

== Format ==
All ties were played in one game, and if the result was a draw, two extra periods of 7½ minutes were played to determine the winner. If there was no winner after that, another extra period of two extra periods of 7½ minutes was played, and if there was still no decision after that, the game was replayed on the opponent's pitch, and if the draw persisted, then the game goes into extra time until a goal was scored.

Despite being a second division team, Amsterdam's Volharding once again reached the semifinals for the second time.

== Results ==
=== First round ===
==== District North ====
| Team 1 | Score | Team 2 |
|---|---|---|
| RAP Amsterdam | 1–2 | EFC Prinses Wilhelmina |
| Volharding Amsterdam | 3–1 | Koninklijke UD 1875 |
| Quick Amsterdam | 2–0 | AVV Amsterdam II |
| Koninklijke HFC | 0–2 | Vitesse Arnheim |
| HFC Haarlem | 5–0 | Achilles 1894 |
| Oranje Haarlem | 2–10 | Steeds Voorwaarts |
| Ajax Leiden | 0–5 | Swift Amsterdam |
| Swift Den Haag | 0–5 | AVV Amsterdam |
| HVV 't Gooi | 0–7 | AFC Quick 1890 |
| Go Ahead Wageningen | 4–1 | EDO Amsterdam |

Note: The match between Ajax Leiden and Swift Amsterdam, which was won 10–1 by the former, was later awarded 0–5 to the latter because Ajax used an ineligible player.

==== Southern District ====
| Team 1 | Score | Team 2 |
|---|---|---|
| HBS Craeyenhout | 7–0 | Celeritas Rotterdam |
| Quick Den Haag | 1–4 | DSVV Ouwe Schoen |
| DSV Concordia Delft | 3:1 | Volharding Rotterdam |
| Sparta Rotterdam | 2–7 | HVV Den Haag |
| Rapiditas Rotterdam | –1 | BVV Wilhelmina |
| Olympia Rotterdam | 5–2 | HVV Den Haag II |
| Saturnus Rotterdam | 1–3 | Unitas Rotterdam |
| NOAD Breda | 5–0 | Achilles Rotterdam |
| Victoria Den Bosch | 3–5 | Quick 1888 |
| Olympia Middelburg | 1–2 | Dordrechtsche FC |

=== Second round ===
==== District North ====
| Team 1 | Score | Team 2 |
|---|---|---|
| EFC Prinses Wilhelmina | 1–3 | Go Ahead Wageningen |
| Vitesse Arnheim | 8–0 | AFC Quick 1890 |
| Volharding Amsterdam | 5–1 | AVV Amsterdam |
| Steeds Voorwaarts | 6–2 | Swift Amsterdam |
| HFC Haarlem | 3–0 | Quick Amsterdam |

==== Southern District ====
| Team 1 | Score | Team 2 |
|---|---|---|
| HBS Craeyenhout | 7–2 | Unitas Rotterdam |
| DSVV Ouwe Schoen | 0–3 | Olympia Rotterdam |
| Rapiditas Rotterdam | 2–0 | HVV Den Haag |
| NOAD Breda | 4–0 | Dordrechtsche FC |
| DSV Concordia Delft | 1–1 (E.T.) | Quick 1888 |
| Quick 1888 | 2–0 | DSV Concordia Delft |

=== Intermediate round ===
==== District North ====
| Team 1 | Score | Team 2 |
|---|---|---|
| Steeds Voorwaarts | 0–4 | Go Ahead Wageningen |

==== Southern District ====
| Team 1 | Score | Team 2 |
|---|---|---|
| NOAD Breda | 2–4 | Olympia Rotterdam |

=== Quarterfinals ===
| Team 1 | Score | Team 2 |
|---|---|---|
| Volharding Amsterdam | 3–0 | Go Ahead Wageningen |
| HBS Craeyenhout | 8–1 | Rapiditas Rotterdam |
| Quick 1888 | 0–1 | HFC Haarlem |
| Olympia Rotterdam | 2–1 | Vitesse Arnheim |

=== Semifinals ===
| Team 1 | Score | Team 2 |
|---|---|---|
| HBS Craeyenhout | 8–0 | Olympia Rotterdam |
| HFC Haarlem | 6–0 | Volharding Amsterdam |

=== Final ===
The final, which took place on 8 May in Heemstede, was contested by HBS Craeyenhout, the reigning champions, and HFC Haarlem, who conceded the first goal because its "goalkeeper thought that Bekker's strike would go wide, so he did not try to clear it, but it bounced against the goalpost and ended up in the net". RAP, however, was able to turn the score around, mainly thanks to Karel Pennink, who assisted Jan van den Berg for the equaliser before scoring the winner himself. Bekker's strike was the only goal that Haarlem conceded throughout the tournament.

8 May 1902
Final

| HFC Haarlem | 2 – 1 | HBS Craeyenhout |
|---|---|---|
| Van den Berg 1–1'; Pennink 2–1' Kerbert; Vlaanderen, Stol; Kock, Floor van Styrum, Gorter, Reijers; Bos, Van den Berg, van Noppen, Kerbert, Pennink | Report | Bekker 0–1' Koopman; Toussaint, Van Lier; Rompies, De Kock, Slanger; Meyer, Lagerwey, De Bekker, Kamperdijk, Bekker. |

Koekamp, Heemstede, Netherlands
Referee: JLF de Meijere
