= Toine van Renterghem =

Dutch footballer

Personal information
- Full name: Antoine François Mathieu van Renterghem
- Date of birth: 17 April 1885
- Place of birth: Goes, Netherlands
- Date of death: 1 March 1967 (aged 81)
- Position: Forward

Senior career*
| Years | Team | Apps | (Gls) |
- HBS Craeyenhout

International career
| 1906–1907 | Netherlands | 3 | (0) |
- * Club domestic league appearances and goals

Antoine François Mathieu van Renterghem, known as Toine van Renterghem (17 April 1885 – 1 March 1967) was a Dutch international footballer who earned three caps for the national side between 1906 and 1907. Van Renterghem played club football for HBS Craeyenhout. He was also part of the Dutch squad for the football tournament at the 1908 Summer Olympics, but he did not play in any matches.
