= Bas Paauwe =

Dutch footballer and manager

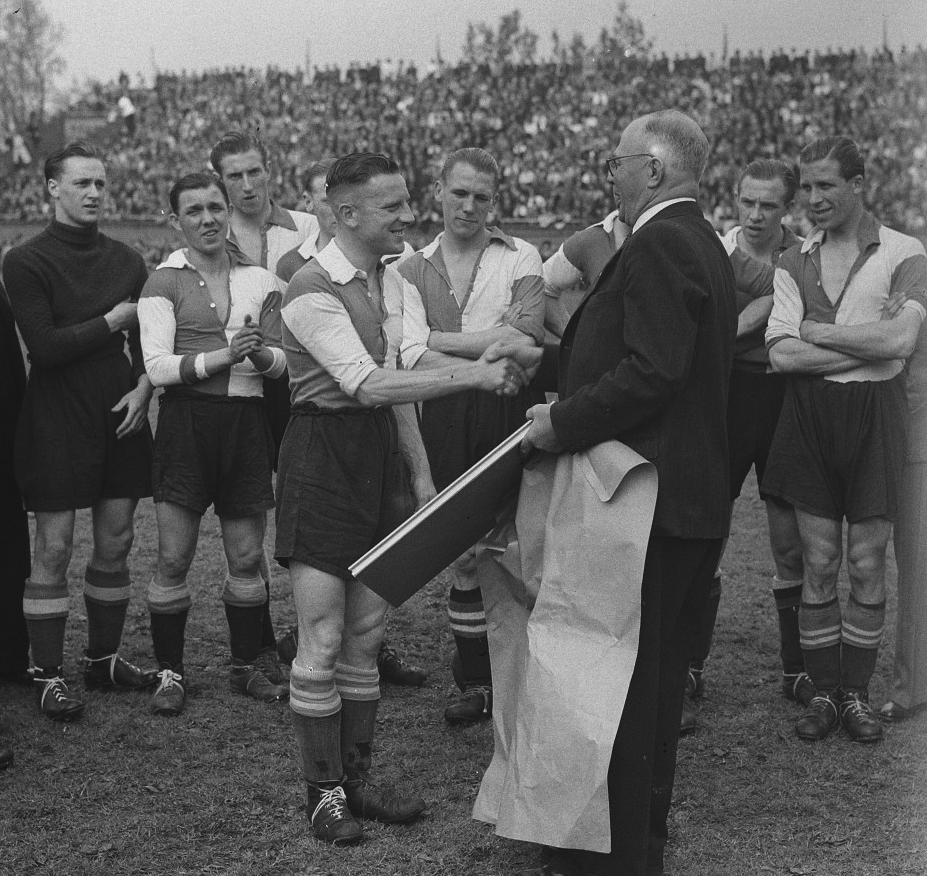

Personal information
- Full name: Bastiaan Jacob Paauwe
- Date of birth: 4 October 1911
- Place of birth: Rotterdam, Netherlands
- Date of death: 27 February 1989 (aged 77)
- Position: Midfielder

Youth career
- Feijenoord

Senior career*
Years	Team	Apps	(Gls)
1929–1947	Feijenoord	311	(18)

International career
1932–1946	Netherlands	31	(1)

Managerial career
- 1947–1953: Maurits
- 1953–1954: WVC Winterswijk
- 1954–1958: HVC
- 1958–1960: vv Ede
- 1960–1962: Enschedese Boys
- 1962–1964: HVC
- 1964–1968: FC Wageningen
- 1968–1969: VVV-Venlo
- 1969–1971: SC Heerenveen
- 1972–1973: HVC
- * Club domestic league appearances and goals

Bastiaan ("Bas") Jacob Paauwe (4 October 1911 – 27 February 1989) was a Dutch footballer who was active as a midfielder. Paauwe played his whole career at Feijenoord and won 31 caps for the Netherlands, scoring one goal.

== Honours ==
- 1929-30 : KNVB Cup winner with Feijenoord
- 1934-35 : KNVB Cup winner with Feijenoord
- 1935-36 : Eredivisie winner with Feijenoord
- 1937-38 : Eredivisie winner with Feijenoord
- 1939-40 : Eredivisie winner with Feijenoord
