= Anton Lens =

Dutch footballer

Personal information
- Date of birth: 28 November 1884
- Place of birth: Jatinegara, Dutch East Indies
- Date of death: 8 October 1955 (aged 70)

Senior career*
| Years | Team | Apps | (Gls) |
| 1903–1909 | HBS Craeyenhout | 59 | (10) |

International career
| 1906 | Netherlands | 2 | (0) |
- * Club domestic league appearances and goals

Anton Lens (28 November 1884 – 8 October 1955) was a Dutch international footballer who earned two caps for the national side in 1906. Lens played club football for HBS Craeyenhout between 1903 and 1909, scoring ten goals in 59 appearances.
