= 1982–83 Eredivisie =

27th season of the Eredivisie

Eredivisie
- Season: 1982–83
- Champions: AFC Ajax (21st title)
- Promoted: Fortuna Sittard; SBV Excelsior; Helmond Sport
- Relegated: FC Twente; NAC; NEC
- European Cup: Ajax
- Cup Winners' Cup: NEC
- UEFA Cup: Feyenoord; PSV Eindhoven; Sparta Rotterdam; FC Groningen
- Matches: 306
- Goals: 965 (3.15 per match)
- Average goals/game: 3.15
- Top goalscorer: (Netherlands) Peter Houtman; Feyenoord 30 goals

The Dutch Eredivisie in the 1982–83 season was contested by 18 teams. Ajax won the championship.

== League standings ==
Pos	Team	Pld	W	D	L	GF	GA	GD	Pts	Qualification or relegation
1	AFC Ajax (Note: AFC Ajax also won the KNVB Cup, thereby taking the double. They would participate in the European Cup, so runners-up NEC qualified for the European Cup Winners' Cup.)	34	26	6	2	106	41	+65	58	Qualified for 1983–84 European Cup
2	Feyenoord	34	22	10	2	72	39	+33	54	Qualified for 1983–84 UEFA Cup
3	PSV Eindhoven	34	21	9	4	80	34	+46	51	Qualified for 1983–84 UEFA Cup
4	Sparta Rotterdam	34	12	13	9	64	52	+12	37	Qualified for 1983–84 UEFA Cup
5	FC Groningen	34	11	15	8	67	57	+10	37	Qualified for 1983–84 UEFA Cup
6	Roda JC	34	13	9	12	56	52	+4	35	
7	HFC Haarlem	34	13	9	12	49	53	−4	35	
8	Fortuna Sittard	34	11	11	12	41	48	−7	33	
9	SBV Excelsior	34	13	6	15	44	47	−3	32	
10	FC Utrecht	34	11	9	14	51	57	−6	31	
11	AZ '67	34	11	8	15	49	40	+9	30	
12	Go Ahead Eagles	34	9	11	14	44	59	−15	29	
13	PEC Zwolle	34	10	7	17	40	58	−18	27	
14	Willem II	34	9	8	17	49	62	−13	26	
15	Helmond Sport	34	8	10	16	44	70	−26	26	
16	FC Twente	34	7	11	16	36	60	−24	25	Relegated to Eerste Divisie
17	NAC	34	6	12	16	39	75	−36	24	Relegated to Eerste Divisie
18	NEC	34	4	14	16	34	61	−27	22	European Cup Winners' Cup and relegated to Eerste Divisie

Source: rsssf.com

== Results ==
Home \ Away	AJA	AZ	EXC	FEY	FSI	GAE	GRO	HFC	HSP	NAC	NEC	PEC	PSV	RJC	SPA	TWE	UTR	WIL
Ajax		2–0	2–1	3–3	6–5	4–1	5–5	6–1	5–0	4–1	5–0	3–0	3–3	3–1	1–1	5–0	3–1	8–2
AZ '67	2–3		3–1	0–1	0–0	0–0	0–0	0–1	4–1	3–3	2–0	0–3	0–0	1–2	0–1	3–2	3–1	3–0
Excelsior	0–3	1–4		2–3	1–0	0–2	3–0	1–1	0–0	2–0	2–1	0–1	1–0	2–0	2–0	1–0	0–2	1–3
Feyenoord	2–2	3–2	1–0		4–1	1–1	2–1	3–1	2–1	6–1	1–0	1–1	2–2	3–2	3–1	2–0	4–1	3–2
Fortuna Sittard	1–3	2–1	0–1	1–0		1–1	1–1	2–0	3–2	1–0	1–0	1–1	0–0	1–1	3–2	3–0	1–2	2–1
Go Ahead Eagles	0–2	2–1	2–1	1–1	1–2		3–1	2–3	3–0	0–0	5–1	2–1	2–4	1–4	1–3	3–3	4–0	1–1
FC Groningen	2–1	0–1	1–1	1–2	3–1	6–0		2–2	4–2	1–1	3–1	3–0	2–2	4–0	1–1	6–1	2–1	4–3
FC Haarlem	0–2	3–3	0–0	0–0	0–0	2–0	1–0		2–2	3–2	2–0	5–1	0–1	2–0	2–1	1–0	4–2	2–0
Helmond Sport	1–4	1–0	1–4	0–1	1–1	1–0	2–2	1–0		6–1	1–0	2–2	2–5	2–0	2–2	0–0	1–1	2–1
NAC	0–2	2–1	0–0	2–3	2–0	0–0	1–1	1–1	4–2		1–1	0–2	1–5	2–2	1–2	3–1	1–0	2–2
N.E.C.	0–4	2–0	2–2	1–1	2–2	1–1	2–2	0–0	1–1	1–1		1–1	1–3	2–3	5–2	0–0	2–1	2–2
PEC Zwolle '82	1–2	0–2	0–2	0–3	1–0	0–1	1–3	2–0	2–2	2–1	1–0		0–2	5–0	0–3	0–1	1–1	3–3
PSV	4–0	1–0	4–3	1–3	3–1	5–0	6–0	2–1	3–1	8–1	2–0	0–1		1–1	3–1	1–1	0–0	2–0
Roda JC	1–2	1–0	1–2	4–1	1–1	2–0	5–1	2–0	3–1	0–0	1–2	3–1	1–2		1–1	3–1	3–3	1–0
Sparta Rotterdam	1–1	1–1	4–2	2–3	1–1	2–2	3–3	5–1	1–2	4–0	2–1	2–1	1–1	2–2		2–3	2–1	3–0
FC Twente	1–2	0–6	0–2	1–1	2–1	1–1	1–1	2–4	3–0	4–0	0–0	2–0	3–1	0–3	1–1		0–0	0–0
FC Utrecht	0–2	0–0	3–2	1–1	4–0	3–1	1–1	4–1	2–1	2–3	2–2	2–3	0–1	3–2	0–3	3–2		2–0
Willem II	0–3	0–3	3–1	0–2	0–1	2–0	0–0	4–3	4–0	3–1	4–0	5–2	1–2	0–0	1–1	1–0	1–2	

Legend: Blue = home team win; Yellow = draw; Red = away team win.

== See also ==
- 1982–83 Eerste Divisie
- 1982–83 KNVB Cup
