= Martien Houtkooper =

Dutch footballer

Personal information
- Full name: Martinus Houtkooper
- Date of birth: 27 October 1891
- Place of birth: Callantsoog, Netherlands
- Date of death: 16 April 1961 (aged 69)
- Place of death: Haarlem, Netherlands
- Position: Forward

Senior career*
Years	Team	Apps	(Gls)
1910-1927	Haarlem		(125)

International career
1919	Netherlands	1	(0)
- * Club domestic league appearances and goals

Martinus "Martien" Houtkooper (27 October 1891 – 16 April 1961) was a Dutch male footballer. He was part of the Netherlands national football team, playing 1 match on 31 August 1919. He was in the Netherlands national team at the 1912 Summer Olympics that won the bronze medal but having not appeared did not receive a medal.

Houtkooper played his entire career for Haarlem, with whom he won the 1912 NVB Cup. He scored both goals in the 2-0 final win over Vitesse. He also played in the previous year's final, when Haarlem lost 1-0 to Quick.

== See also ==
- List of Dutch international footballers
