= Henk Vermetten =

Dutch footballer (1895–1964)

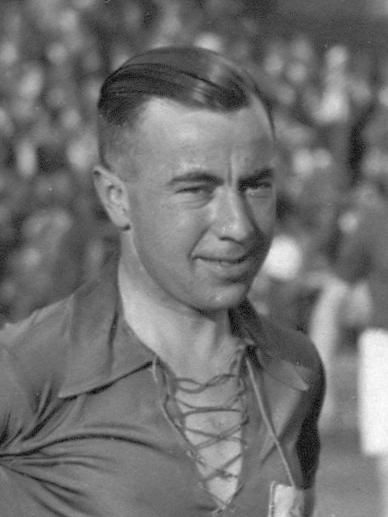
- Henk Vermetten in 1930

Personal information
- Full name: Hendrik Arnoldus Vermetten
- Date of birth: 19 August 1895
- Place of birth: Kralingen, Netherlands
- Date of death: 7 August 1964 (aged 68)
- Place of death: Scheveningen, Netherlands

Youth career
- DVS

Senior career*
Years	Team	Apps	(Gls)
1921–1935	HBS	268	(16)

International career
1924–1930	Netherlands	6	(0)
- * Club domestic league appearances and goals

Hendrik Arnoldus "Henk" Vermetten (19 August 1895 – 7 August 1964) was a Dutch footballer.

Starting his career with DVS from Schiedam, Vermetten spent his senior career with HBS. There, he won the Netherlands Football League Championship in the 1924–25 season.

Between 1924 and 1925 and in 1930 he gained six caps for the Netherlands, where he was captain twice. With the Netherlands he took part in the men's tournament at the 1924 Summer Olympics, where they finished fourth. After a five-year absence, he made his return to the Netherlands national team in 1930.

== Honours ==
HBS

- Netherlands Football League Championship: 1924–25
