= 1982–83 Eerste Divisie =

27th season of the second-tier football league in Netherlands

Eerste Divisie
- Season: 1982–83
- Champions: DS '79
- Promoted: DS '79; FC Volendam; FC Den Bosch
- Goals: 772
- Average goals/game: 3.21

The Dutch Eerste Divisie in the 1982–83 season was contested by 16 teams, two less than the previous season. This was due to the disbandment of FC Amsterdam at the end of last season and the disbandment of SC Amersfoort halfway this year. DS '79 won the championship.

== New entrants ==
Relegated from the 1981–82 Eredivisie

- FC Den Haag
- De Graafschap
- MVV Maastricht

== League standings ==
Pos	Team	Pld	W	D	L	GF	GA	GD	Pts	Promotion or qualification
1	DS '79	30	16	10	4	59	37	+22	42	Promoted to Eredivisie.
2	FC Volendam	30	17	6	7	73	41	+32	40	Promoted to Eredivisie.
3	FC Den Bosch	30	15	8	7	51	28	+23	38	Qualified for Promotion play-off as Period champions.
4	MVV	30	13	10	7	52	31	+21	36	Qualified for Promotion play-off as Period champions.
5	Cambuur	30	15	6	9	48	35	+13	36	Qualified for Promotion play-off as Period champions.
6	FC Den Haag	30	11	10	9	60	44	+16	32	
7	FC VVV	30	14	3	13	54	56	−2	31	Qualified for Promotion play-off as Period champions.
8	SC Heerenveen	30	9	12	9	46	50	−4	30	
9	SVV	30	10	10	10	42	55	−13	30	
10	Vitesse	30	12	5	13	44	41	+3	29	
11	FC Eindhoven	30	10	8	12	41	54	−13	28	
12	Veendam	30	7	12	11	44	50	−6	26	
13	FC Wageningen	30	9	5	16	43	62	−19	23	
14	De Graafschap	30	8	5	17	37	56	−19	21	
15	Telstar	30	7	6	17	37	56	−19	20	
16	Heracles	30	8	2	20	41	76	−35	18	
0	SC Amersfoort	0	0	0	0	0	0	0	0	The club withdrew after 15 games, their results were expunged, and the club was disbanded.

Source: rsssf.com

== Promotion competition ==
In the promotion competition, four period winners (the best teams during each of the four quarters of the regular competition) played for promotion to the Eredivisie.

Pos	Team	Pld	W	D	L	GF	GA	GD	Pts	Promotion
1	FC Den Bosch	6	4	1	1	12	4	+8	9	Promoted to Eredivisie.
2	SC Cambuur	6	3	2	1	8	5	+3	8	
3	VVV-Venlo	6	2	0	4	4	9	−5	4	
4	MVV Maastricht	6	1	1	4	4	10	−6	3	

Source: rsssf.com

== Attendances ==
#	Club	Average
1	Cambuur	7,407
2	Volendam	4,375
3	DS '79	4,220
4	MVV	3,922
5	Heerenveen	3,813
6	VVV	3,527
7	Den Haag	3,478
8	Den Bosch	3,169
9	Wageningen	2,807
10	Eindhoven	2,267
11	Vitesse	2,106
12	Veendam	2,088
13	Heracles	1,969
14	De Graafschap	1,581
15	Telstar	1,400
16	SVV	1,333
17	Amersfoort	979

== See also ==
- 1982–83 Eredivisie
- 1982–83 KNVB Cup
