= Karel Gleenewinkel Kamperdijk =

Dutch footballer

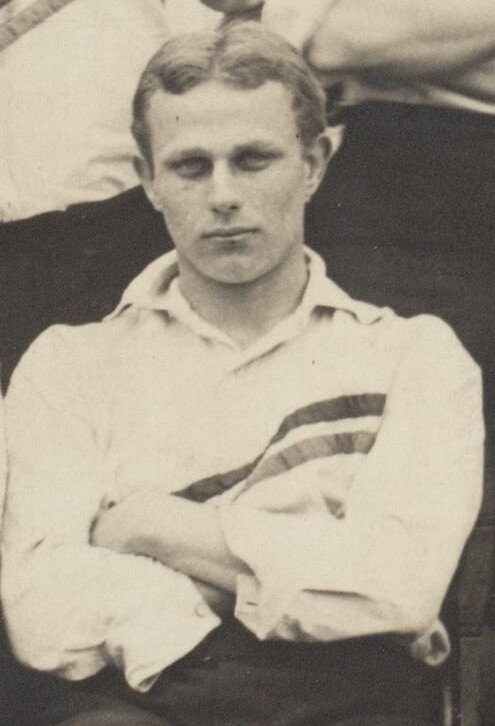
- Gleenewinkel Kamperdijk (1905)

Personal information
- Full name: Karel Willem Hendrik Gleenewinkel Kamperdijk
- Date of birth: 30 October 1883
- Place of birth: Haarlem, Netherlands
- Date of death: 20 June 1975 (aged 91)
- Place of death: Rijswijk, Netherlands
- Position: Forward

Senior career*
Years	Team	Apps	(Gls)
1901-1906	HBS Craeyenhout		
1918-1923	HBS Craeyenhout		

International career
1905	Netherlands	2	(0)
- * Club domestic league appearances and goals

Karel Willem Hendrik Gleenewinkel Kamperdijk (October 30, 1883 in Haarlem - June 20, 1975 in Rijswijk) was a Dutch football player.

Gleenewinkel Kamperdijk played for HBS Craeyenhout in the early years of the 20th century. He was part of the first Netherlands national football team, in the 1905-04-30 match against Belgium (4-1 victory). Two weeks later, Gleenewinkel Kamperdijk was part of the squad again, in the return game against Belgium on 1905-05-14, in Rotterdam (4-0 victory). These would remain the only caps of his career.

== Personal life ==
Gleenewinkel Kamperdijk married Christina Carolina Albertina Fehr on 1910-09-08. They had two daughters together, Vera Paulina Adolphina (1911-1984) and Wilhelmina Laura (1913-1991). The couple divorced on 1919-12-16.
