= 1986–87 Eerste Divisie =

31st season of the second-tier football league in Netherlands

Eerste Divisie
- Season: 1986–87
- Champions: Volendam
- Promoted: Volendam; Willem II; DS '79
- Goals: 1,130
- Average goals/game: 3.30
- Top goalscorer: Henk Grim (NEC), 29 goals

The Dutch Eerste Divisie in the 1986–87 season was contested by 19 teams. Volendam won the championship.

== New entrants ==
Relegated from the 1985–86 Eredivisie

- Heracles
- MVV
- NEC

== League standings ==
Pos	Team	Pld	W	D	L	GF	GA	GD	Pts	Promotion or qualification
1	Volendam	36	19	12	5	83	57	+26	50	Promoted to Eredivisie.
2	Willem II	36	20	9	7	75	48	+27	49	Promoted to Eredivisie.
3	Cambuur	36	19	9	8	80	59	+21	47	Qualified for Promotion play-off as Period champions.
4	RKC	36	19	8	9	60	46	+14	46	Qualified for Promotion play-off as Period champions.
5	MVV	36	16	10	10	75	51	+24	42	
6	NEC	36	14	12	10	65	56	+9	40	Qualified for Promotion play-off as Period champions.
7	Vitesse	36	16	8	12	62	59	+3	40	
8	NAC	36	13	13	10	48	45	+3	39	
9	DS '79	36	13	12	11	76	63	+13	38	Qualified for Promotion play-off as Period champions.
10	De Graafschap	36	12	14	10	53	48	+5	38	
11	Eindhoven	36	14	7	15	65	53	+12	35	
12	Heerenveen	36	11	13	12	45	53	−8	35	
13	RBC	36	10	11	15	68	69	−1	31	
14	SVV	36	11	8	17	49	68	−19	30	
15	Heracles	36	9	10	17	48	63	−15	28	
16	Emmen	36	7	12	17	41	59	−18	26	
17	Helmond Sport	36	7	12	17	45	69	−24	26	
18	Wageningen	36	11	1	24	53	84	−31	23	
19	Telstar	36	7	7	22	39	80	−41	21	

Source: rsssf.com

== Promotion competition ==
In the promotion competition, four period winners (the best teams during each of the four quarters of the regular competition) played for promotion to the Eredivisie.

Pos	Team	Pld	W	D	L	GF	GA	GD	Pts	Promotion
1	DS '79	6	5	0	1	12	5	+7	10	Promoted to Eredivisie.
2	Cambuur	6	3	0	3	15	11	+4	6	
3	RKC	6	2	1	3	10	9	+1	5	
4	NEC	6	1	1	4	10	22	−12	3	

Source: rsssf.com

== Attendances ==
#	Club	Average
1	Cambuur	7,039
2	Willem II	4,314
3	Heerenveen	4,022
4	Volendam	3,144
5	NEC	2,889
6	De Graafschap	2,689
7	Emmen	2,567
8	NAC	2,525
9	RBC	2,317
10	RKC	2,147
11	Eindhoven	1,950
12	Vitesse	1,850
13	MVV	1,823
14	DS '79	1,758
15	Helmond	1,706
16	Heracles	1,492
17	Wageningen	1,317
18	Telstar	1,083
19	SVV	844

== See also ==
- 1986–87 Eredivisie
- 1986–87 KNVB Cup
