= Charles van Baar van Slangenburgh =

Dutch footballer

Personal information
- Date of birth: 31 March 1902
- Date of death: 17 July 1978 (aged 76)

Senior career*
Years	Team	Apps	(Gls)
1920-1926	HBS Craeyenhout	109	(66)

International career
1924–1925	Netherlands	6	(5)
- * Club domestic league appearances and goals

Charles van Baar van Slangenburgh (31 March 1902 – 17 July 1978) was a Dutch footballer. He played in six matches for the Netherlands national football team from 1924 to 1925.
