= HBS Craeyenhout =

Dutch sports club

- Full name: HBS Craeyenhout
- Founded: 7 October 1893; 133 years ago
- Ground: Sportpark Daal en Bergselaan; The Hague
- Capacity: 1,000
- Chairman: Marcus Schuchmann
- Manager: Mike de Geer
- League: Vierde Divisie
- 2024–25: Vierde Divisie B, 12th of 16
Home colours

HBS Craeyenhout is an omnisports club based in The Hague that fields teams in association football, cricket and hockey. The club is best known for its football team, which is one of the original clubs of Dutch football, and three times national champions (1903–04, 1905–06,1924–1925). The football club refused to enter into professionalism in the 1950s and has played at the amateur level ever since. It currently plays in the Vierde Divisie, the fifth tier of the Dutch football league system.

== Football ==
Founded in 1893, HBS Craeyenhout spent a period of 58 years – 1896 to 1954 – in the top division of Dutch football, winning the league in 1903–04, 1905–06 and 1924–1925. The club contributed a number of players to the Dutch national side, and chose to keep playing as an amateur team. A notable part in HBS Craeyenhout's history is when they defeated Racing of Belgium 1–0 in the 1901 Coupe Ponthoz Final, a competition that is considered one of the predecessors to UEFA-sanctioned European competitions.

=== History ===
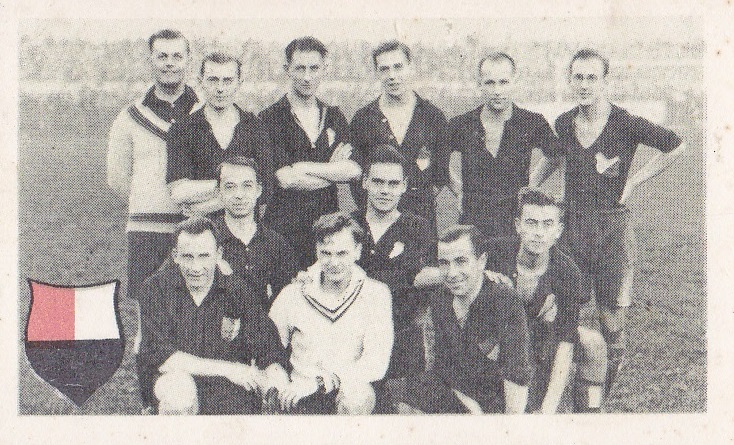
HBS football team 1931-1932: v.d. Bergen, van Romondt, Ophorst, van Kesteren, d'Fonseca, Diehl, Schoorl, Arntzenius, Denis, Vermetten, Rambonnet

A boy got a ball for his birthday gift and with two of his friends from the Secondary School in The Hague set up a "Football Club" on 7 October 1893. The three founders were J. Dijkman, A.W.G. Stigter and H. Tengbergen. They played at the Hague Malieveld, where every Hague club played at that time. The first shirt was blue with white letters HBS on. On October 1, 1894, HBS founded with HVV Football at the Hague. In 1897 the club merged with HBS Hector. In addition, the dress in a white shirt with a wide red stripe on the chest and back was changed and black trousers. The club was no longer a school club, in 1898, retaining the initials, adopted the name "Houdt Braef Stant". In 1898 the government, as owner of the Malieveld banned football there. HVV moved to its current location in the Benoordenhout and HBS to a field on the Beeklaan at a farm named "Hanenburg '(on the site of the current Hanenburglaan). In 1900 moved to the HBS Valkenboslaan, on the corner of the current Weimar Street, not far from the former location vanVUC. In 1905 HBS chose a new outfit, which was completely black. The nickname 'Crows' dates from that time. At that time, HBS twice became champion and twice won the silver ball. In 1910 HBS moved because of the growth of the club to Houtrust, which was located at the beginning of the Sportlaan in Houtrust Avenue. Here was a stadium that would eventually have capacity for 25 000 spectators. The construction of the Atlantic Wall forced HBS Houtrust to be abandoned in 1943 and the club got to shelter at VUC Schenkkade. After repairs HBS returned after the war back to Houtrust. From 1955 she was sharing the accommodation with Scheveningen Holland Sport, one of the two Hague professional clubs. HBS played one Sunday and SHS another. In 1966 the Hague discussed with HBS a move to the Houtrust Daal and Bergselaan because the sublet actually was a thorn in the eyes of the council. In 1968 the move was finalized. One could not simply join HBS. Until well into the 60s a system of balloting ensured that unwanted people stayed out. Membership of HBS safeguarded - a new member could only join if he was nominated by five members of HBS.

In 2011 HBS was promoted to the Topklasse as Hoofdklasse champions.

In the 2021–22 season, HBS qualified for the promotion playoffs where they played SV Orion in the first round. After a 1–1 draw in the first leg, the second leg finished 0-0 (1–1 on aggregate) after 90 minutes, and the match went to extra time. After two goals in the first ten minutes of extra time from Orion, HBS came back to score in the 105th minute and equalize in the 112th minute, but a 117th-minute goal for Orion meant that HBS lost 4–3 on aggregate.

=== National team players ===
The following players were called up to represent their national teams in international football and received caps during their tenure with HBS:

- (Netherlands) Charles van Baar van Slangenburgh (1920–1926)
- (Netherlands) Beb Bakhuys (1925–1926; 1935–1937)
- (Netherlands) Kees Bekker (1900–1911)
- (Netherlands) Joop Boutmy (1910–1915; 1918–1919; 1922)
- (Netherlands) Frans de Bruijn Kops (1904–1909)
- (Netherlands) Harry Dénis (1911–1934)
- (Netherlands) Karel Gleenewinkel Kamperdijk (1901–1923)
- (Netherlands) Vic Gonsalves (1906–1912)
- (Netherlands) Hans van Kesteren (1927–1937)
- (Netherlands) Terus Küchlin (1924–1930)
- (Netherlands) Harry Kuneman (1906–1912)
- (Netherlands) Jampie Kuneman (1941–1951)
- (Netherlands) Anton Lens (1903–1909)
- (Netherlands) Evert Mul (1929–1938; 1939)
- (Netherlands) Eddy de Neve (1905–1906)
- (Netherlands) Oscar van Rappard (1912–1921)
- (Netherlands) Toine van Renterghem (1905–1911)
- (Netherlands) Felix Smeets (1924–1930)
- (Netherlands) Piet Valkenburg (1906–1913)
- (Netherlands) Henk Vermetten (1921–1935)

- Years in brackets indicate careerspan with HBS Craeyenhout.

=== Honours ===
Netherlands Football League Championship

- Champions (3): 1903–04, 1905–06, 1924–25
