= Evert Mul =

Dutch footballer

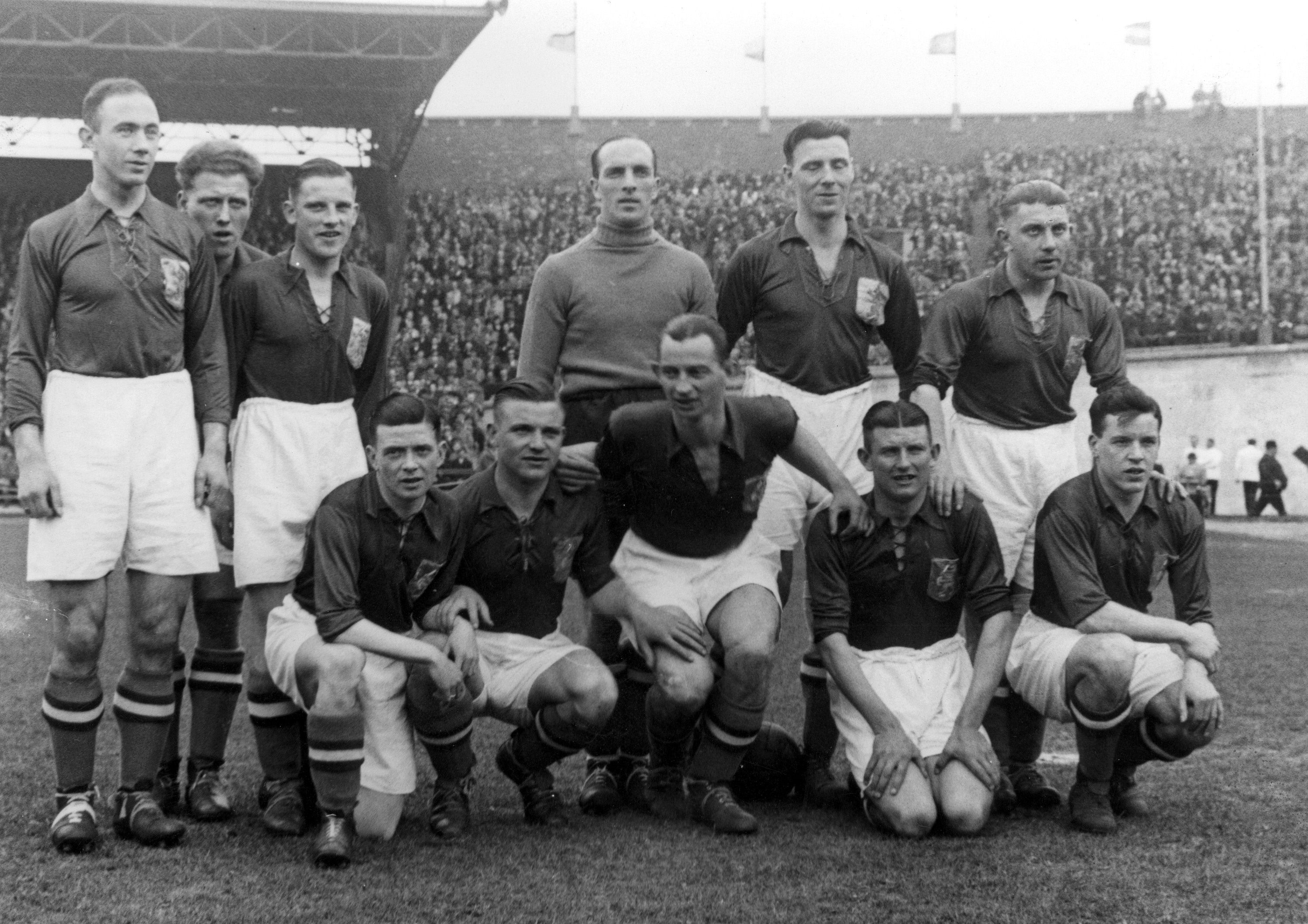
- Mul (goalkeeper), Netherlands football team 1936

Personal information
- Date of birth: 18 January 1909
- Place of birth: The Hague
- Date of death: 16 February 1974 (aged 65)
- Place of death: Breda

International career
Years	Team	Apps	(Gls)
1936	Netherlands	1	(0)

Evert Mul (18 January 1909 – 16 February 1974) was a Dutch footballer. He played in one match for the Netherlands national football team in 1936.

His son is the footballer Rob Mul.
