= Dick Mulderij =

Dutch footballer (1949–2020)

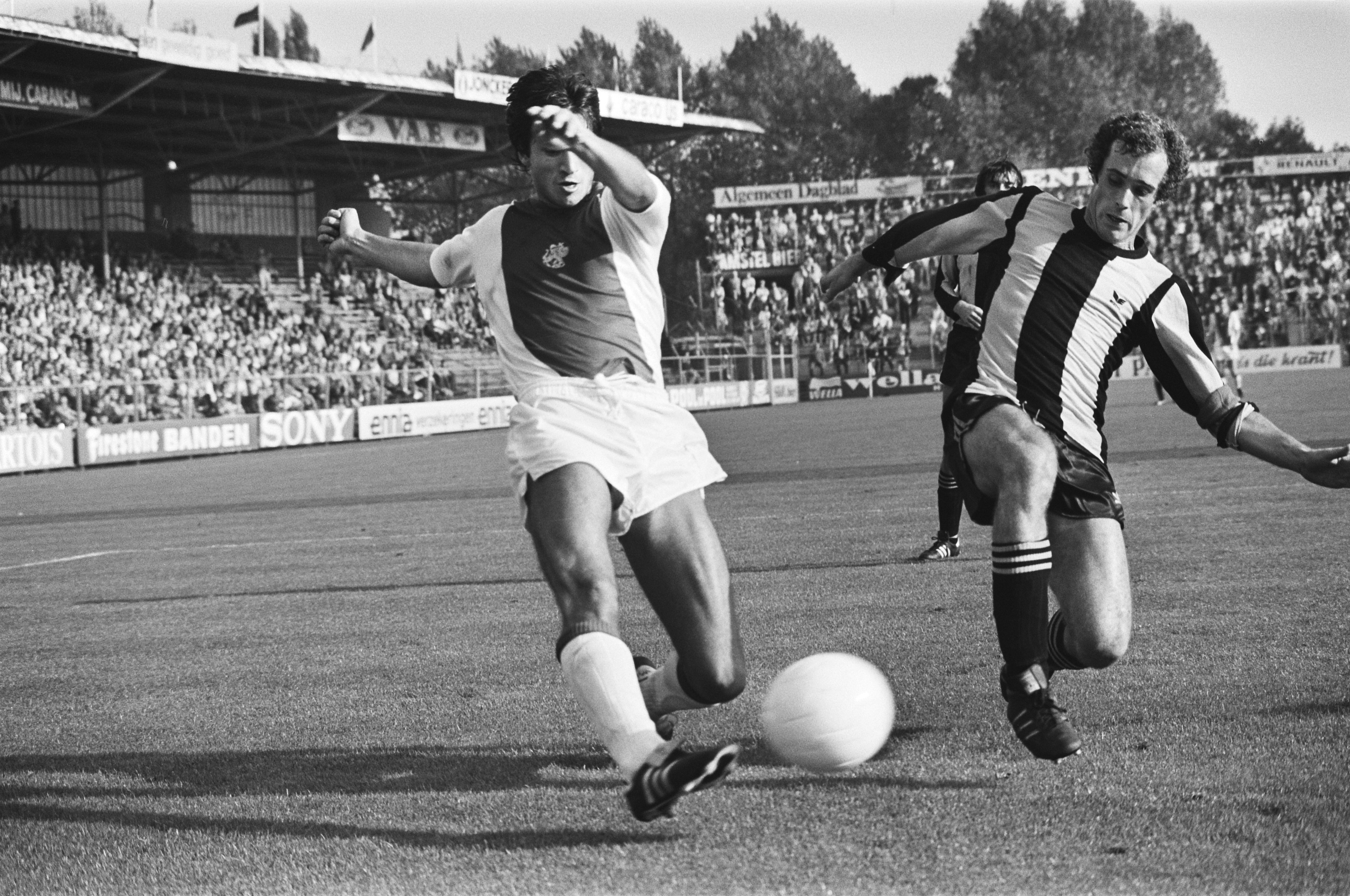
- Mulderij (right) in a duel with Tscheu la Ling

Personal information
- Full name: Hendrikus Mulderij
- Date of birth: 9 October 1949
- Place of birth: Apeldoorn, Netherlands
- Date of death: 27 October 2020 (aged 71)
- Place of death: , Netherlands
- Position: Central defender

Youth career
- 1965-1970: WSV Apeldoorn

Senior career*
Years	Team	Apps	(Gls)
1970–1971	AGOVV		
1971–1975	Heracles '74		
1975–1980	Vitesse	159	(5)
1980–1984	N.E.C.	88	(4)

Managerial career
- 1987-1989: AGOVV
- WSV Apeldoorn
- 2000: AGOVV
- * Club domestic league appearances and goals

Hendrikus "Dick" Mulderij (9 October 1949 – 27 October 2020) was a Dutch footballer who played as a central defender.

== Club career ==
Born in Apeldoorn, Mulderij started his career at local amateur side WSV Apeldoorn and later joined Tweede Divisie club AGOVV. He left them for Heracles '74 in 1971 after AGOVV was demoted from professional football. He then played in the Eredivisie for Vitesse (with Gerard Somer moving the other way around in 1975) after clinching promotion from the Eerste Divisie with them in 1976-77 and moved to their eternal rivals N.E.C. after Vitesse's relegation back to the second tier in 1980. After losing the 1983 KNVB Cup Final to Ajax, Mulderij played with NEC in their 1983–84 European Cup Winners' Cup campaign where they were beaten by Spanish giants FC Barcelona in the second round. He exchanged his shirt with Johan Cruyff after the 1983 Cup Final, it proved to be the last one Cruyff wore for Ajax and was later auctioned for a Cancer Foundation. Mulderij retired from playing in 1984.

He amassed over 500 matches in professional football.

== Managerial career ==
Mulderij returned to Vitesse to become a youth coach and later managed amateur sides AGOVV and WSV.

== Personal life ==
After retiring from professional football, Mulderij ran an insurance company. He was married to Ineke and they had three children. They lived in Klarenbeek.
