= VUC =

VUC may stand for:

== Education ==
- Victoria University College, Myanmar - first and the most successful private university in Myanmar
- Vestfold University College, Norwegian university
- Victoria University College of Wellington
- Voksenuddannelsescenter, Danish Adult Education Centre

== Sports ==
- Nikola Vučević, basketball player

== Technology ==
- IBM Virtual Universe Community
