= Jampie Kuneman =

Dutch footballer (1923–2018)

Personal information
- Date of birth: 20 July 1923
- Date of death: 9 April 2018 (aged 94)

International career
Years	Team	Apps	(Gls)
1951	Netherlands	2	(0)

Jampie Kuneman (20 July 1923 – 9 April 2018) was a Dutch footballer. He played in two matches for the Netherlands national football team in 1951.
