= Kees Bekker =

Dutch footballer (1883–1964)

Personal information
- Full name: Cornelis Bekker
- Date of birth: 26 January 1883
- Place of birth: Nijmegen, Netherlands
- Date of death: 28 December 1964 (aged 81)
- Place of death: Amsterdam, Netherlands
- Position: Defender

Senior career*
Years	Team	Apps	(Gls)
1900–1911	HBS Craeyenhout	150	(82)
1911–1915	Be Quick 1887		

International career
1906–1908	Netherlands	6	(0)
- * Club domestic league appearances and goals

Kees Bekker (26 January 1883 – 28 December 1964) was a Dutch international footballer who earned six caps for the national side between 1906 and 1908.

== Club career ==
Bekker scored 82 goals in 150 matches for HBS Craeyenhout, where we has made honorary member in 1914. He moved to Groningen to study medicine and play for Be Quick Groningen. He later became a surgeon and worked as a general practitioner in Amsterdam.

== International career ==
Bekker made his debut for the Netherlands in an April 1906 friendly match against Belgium and earned a total of 6 caps, scoring no goals. His final international was an October 1908 friendly against Sweden. He was also part of the Dutch squad for the football tournament at the 1908 Summer Olympics, but he did not play in any matches.
