= Marco van der Heide =

Dutch footballer (born 1989)

Personal information
- Date of birth: 12 January 1989 (age 37)
- Place of birth: Drachten, Netherlands
- Height: 1.88 m (6 ft 2 in)
- Position: Attacking midfielder

Youth career
- Drachtster Boys

Senior career*
Years	Team	Apps	(Gls)
-2009	Drachtster Boys		
2009–2011	Flevo Boys	30+	(14+)
2011–2013	Cambuur	15	(4)
2013-2015	Drachtster Boys		
2015-2017	Oranje Nassau		
2017-2021	ACV		
- * Club domestic league appearances and goals

Marco van der Heide
- Website: 360scouting.com

Marco van der Heide (born 12 January 1989) is a Dutch retired footballer who played as an attacking midfielder.

In the summer of 2011, Van der Heide signed his first professional contract with SC Cambuur. He came from Flevo Boys. Before that he played in the First Division for Drachtster Boys. PEC Zwolle also wanted to sign him, but Van der Heide chose to join Cambuur instead.

A lingering groin injury sidelined him for months during the 2011-2012 First Division season. He didn't make his debut until March 2, 2012, in a home match against FC Volendam (4–1). He capped his substitute appearance with a goal.

The following season, his groin continued to bother him, forcing him to be substituted in the first eight matches of the season. He scored three goals, including the winners against nearest rivals FC Volendam (1–2) and Sparta Rotterdam (3–2). In the home match against FC Dordrecht, Van der Heide collided heavily with Josimar Lima. He suffered a severe concussion and was forced to end his career. In December 2013, Cambuur and Van der Heide parted ways, effective immediately.

Four seasons later, he resumed playing football at the amateur level, first for two seasons with Oranje Nassau, where he also became assistant manager, and then for four seasons with ACV Assen in the Third Division. He retired in 2021.

After his career, Van der Heide wrote the book 'Talent van Morgen' together with Bart Heuvingh about talent development in sports, became an editor at the coaching magazine De Voetbaltrainer, and started working as a scouting assistant for professional clubs.
