= Hugo Borst =

Dutch sports journalist (born 1962)

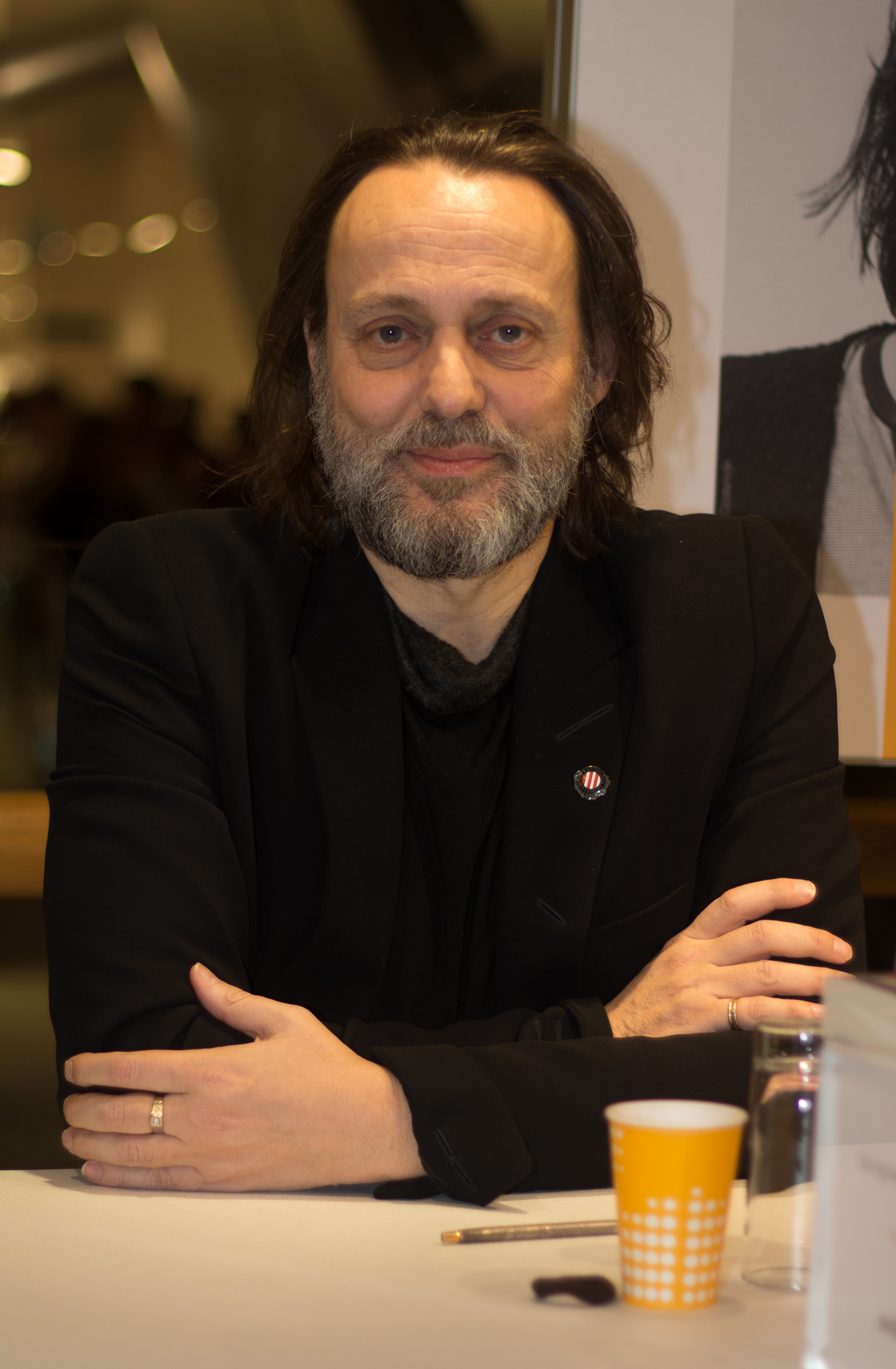
- Borst in 2016
- Born: 15 June 1962 (age 64); Rotterdam, Netherlands
- Occupations: Writer, critic

Hugo Borst (born 15 June 1962, Rotterdam) is a Dutch writer, editor, TV personality and critic (best known for his football critiques).

== Career ==
Borst finished school when he was 18, the so-called havo. Although he never played professional football, he became a journalist for the magazine Voetbal International in 1985. After working for Voetbal International for six years he started to write for another magazine, Panorama. He did that for three years only. He now writes columns for the Algemeen Dagblad (mostly about Football) as well for the magazine Esquire, about love and sex. He also is one of the main editors for the soccermagazine Hard Gras.

Borst also appeared on Dutch television. An avid Sparta Rotterdam supporter, he was a regular guest in the soccer discussion program Studio Voetbal as well as regular guest in the current affairs program De Wereld Draait Door. He also presented his own television program, Over Vaders en Zonen. In this show Borst examines issues of raising autistic children, a topic to which he was drawn due to his experiences with his own autistic son.

In 2011, Borst ceased all writing and television activities, claiming he was mentally exhausted.

During the 2014 World Cup, Borst appeared on Nederland 1's "Studio Brasil" as a pundit.

Hugo Borst became slightly discredited late 2025 due to unpaid parking tickets spread throughout the Netherlands, when questioned about the matter, Borst declined to answer. ( Insider source, Powned 2025.10.25 report)

== Books ==
- De Coolsingel bleef leeg (1996)
- Over vaders en zonen (2005)
- Het grote, gezellige voetbalquizboek voor het hele gezin (2006)
- Over lust en liefde. Verhaaltjes voor het slapengaan (als men niets beters te doen heeft natuurlijk) (2007)
- Schieten op Volkert van der G. De beste voetbalverhalen (2008)
- Over vaders en zonen. Een controversieel verhaal over de verboden liefde tussen een vader en zijn zoon (2008)
- Alle ballen op Heintje (2009)
- Waarom ik zo van Sparta hou (2010)
- Kappen (2011)
- O, Louis (2014)
- Ma. Hugo Borst over zijn dementerende moeder. (2015)
- Ach, moedertje. Vervolg op het boek Ma. (2017)

| Year | Medium | Function |
| 1985–1991 | Voetbal International | Journalist |
| 1991–1994 | Panorama | Journalist |
| 1994 - | Hard Gras | Head editor (since 2004) |
| 2004 | Komt dat schot (BNN) | Judge member |
| 2005 - | Algemeen Dagblad | Columnist |
| 2005 - | Esquire | Columnist |
| 2005–2010 | Studio Voetbal (NOS) | Regular Guest |
| 2006–2010 | De Wereld Draait Door (VARA) | Regular Guest |
| 2007–2009 | Over Vaders en Zonen (VPRO) | Interviewer and presenter |
| 2010 | WIA 4 (VPRO) | Voice over |
