= Jan Thomée =

Dutch footballer

Olympic medal record

Men's Football
Bronze medal – third place	1908 London	Team competition

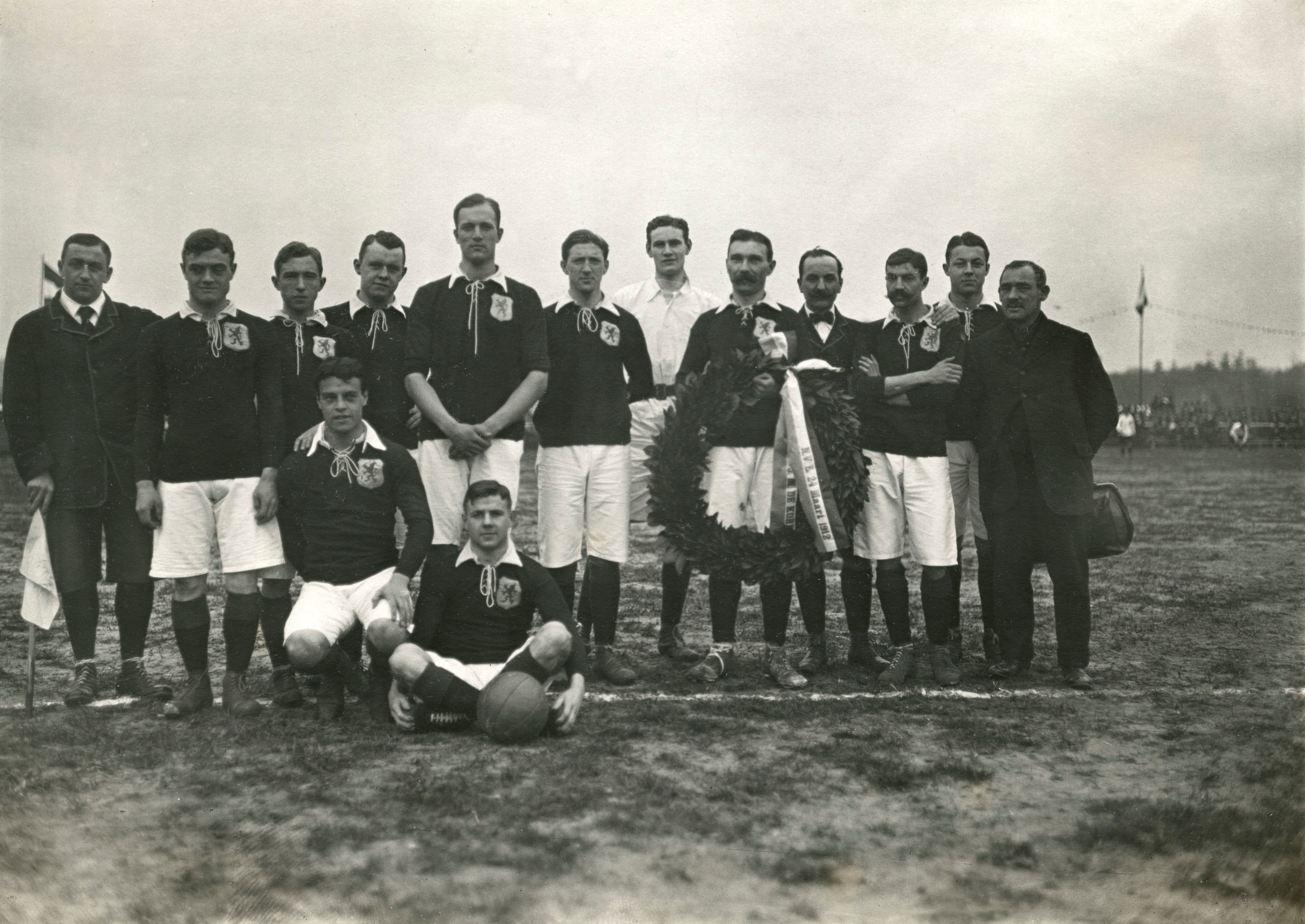
Thomée & the Netherlands national squad (1912). Thomée 5th man standing from left

Johannes "Jan" Thomée (4 December 1886 – 1 April 1954) was a Dutch footballer. He was born and died in Delft. He was included in the Netherlands national team for the 1908 Summer Olympics that won the bronze medal.

Thomée became the all-time top scorer for the Netherlands on 16 October 1910. His goal against Germany was his eleventh goal for the Netherlands, breaking the record that Edu Snethlage had held since 21 March 1909. He improved his record by scoring against Belgium on 19 March 1911, by scoring two goals against Belgium on 10 March 1912, and by scoring two goals against Germany on 24 March 1912. Thomée's record would be broken on 9 March 1913, when Mannes Francken of Koninklijke HFC scored his 17th goal for the Netherlands in a match against Belgium.

He is still one of few people who joined the national team while still playing second class football at DSV Concordia.
