= 1924–25 Netherlands Football League Championship =

Netherl. Football Championship
- Season: 1924–1925
- Champions: HBS Craeyenhout (3rd title)

The Netherlands Football League Championship 1924–1925 was contested by 51 teams participating in five divisions. The national champion would be determined by a play-off featuring the winners of the eastern, northern, southern and two western football divisions of the Netherlands. HBS Craeyenhout won this year's championship by beating NAC, Sparta Rotterdam, Go Ahead and LAC Frisia 1883.

== New entrants ==
Eerste Klasse East:

- Promoted from 2nd Division: FC Wageningen

Eerste Klasse North:

- Promoted from 2nd Division: GVV Groningen

Eerste Klasse South:

- Promoted from 2nd Division: De Valk

Eerste Klasse West-I:

- Moving in from West-II: Ajax Sportman Combinatie, Blauw-Wit Amsterdam, HFC Haarlem, HC & CV Quick and Sparta Rotterdam
- Promoted from 2nd Division: GVV Unitas

Eerste Klasse West-II:

- Moving in from West-I: AFC Ajax, DFC, HVV Den Haag, RCH and VOC
- Promoted from 2nd Division: HFC EDO

== Divisions ==
=== Eerste Klasse East ===
Pos	Team	Pld	W	D	L	GF	GA	GD	Pts	Qualification or relegation
1	Go Ahead	18	14	4	0	41	11	+30	32	Qualified for Championship play-off
2	SC Enschede	18	9	3	6	30	21	+9	21	
3	Vitesse Arnhem	18	9	2	7	31	26	+5	20	
4	Heracles	18	8	3	7	33	27	+6	19	
5	Enschedese Boys	18	8	3	7	28	24	+4	19	
6	ZAC	18	7	4	7	42	34	+8	18	
7	HVV Hengelo	18	6	3	9	35	38	−3	15	
8	FC Wageningen	18	5	5	8	25	29	−4	15	
9	Quick Nijmegen	18	5	4	9	25	39	−14	14	
10	Koninklijke UD	18	2	3	13	12	53	−41	7	Relegated to 2nd Division

Source: rsssf.com

=== Eerste Klasse North ===
Pos	Team	Pld	W	D	L	GF	GA	GD	Pts	Qualification or relegation
1	LAC Frisia 1883	18	11	5	2	47	13	+34	27	Qualified for Championship play-off
2	Be Quick 1887	18	12	3	3	63	24	+39	27	
3	Velocitas 1897	18	10	3	5	46	23	+23	23	
4	Achilles 1894	18	10	2	6	45	43	+2	22	
5	Veendam	18	7	5	6	29	28	+1	19	
6	VV Leeuwarden	18	7	2	9	41	46	−5	16	
7	LVV Friesland	18	5	4	9	18	29	−11	14	
8	GVV Groningen	18	4	6	8	23	44	−21	14	
9	WVV Winschoten	18	4	2	12	31	55	−24	10	
10	MVV Alcides	18	3	2	13	19	57	−38	8	Relegated to 2nd Division

Source: rsssf.com

=== Eerste Klasse South ===
Pos	Team	Pld	W	D	L	GF	GA	GD	Pts	Qualification or relegation
1	NAC	20	16	1	3	62	27	+35	33	Qualified for Championship play-off
2	MVV Maastricht	20	14	2	4	39	14	+25	30	
3	RKVV Wilhelmina	20	11	2	7	42	32	+10	24	
4	NOAD	20	8	5	7	27	22	+5	21	
5	De Valk	20	8	5	7	37	41	−4	21	
6	BVV Den Bosch	20	8	4	8	32	27	+5	20	
7	FC Eindhoven	20	8	4	8	32	34	−2	20	
8	Willem II	20	6	5	9	38	38	0	17	
9	Bredania	20	4	6	10	18	33	−15	14	Merged with 't Zesde to form Bredania/'t Zesde.
10	Alliance	20	5	1	14	29	57	−28	11	Relegated to 2nd Division
11	PSV Eindhoven	20	4	1	15	25	56	−31	9	Relegated to 2nd Division

Source: rsssf.com

=== Eerste Klasse West-I ===
Pos	Team	Pld	W	D	L	GF	GA	GD	Pts	Qualification or relegation
1	Sparta Rotterdam	18	12	2	4	41	23	+18	26	Qualified for Championship play-off
2	Feijenoord	18	11	3	4	51	22	+29	25	Division West-II next season
3	Blauw-Wit Amsterdam	18	9	4	5	40	27	+13	22	
4	ZFC	18	8	2	8	34	39	−5	18	Division West-II next season
5	HVV 't Gooi	18	6	5	7	34	25	+9	17	
6	HFC Haarlem	18	6	5	7	36	40	−4	17	Division West-II next season
7	Koninklijke HFC	18	6	3	9	37	43	−6	15	
8	Ajax Sportman Combinatie	18	6	2	10	39	51	−12	14	Division West-II next season
9	GVV Unitas	18	5	4	9	23	39	−16	14	
10	HC & CV Quick	18	5	2	11	23	49	−26	12	Relegated to 2nd Division

Source: rsssf.com

=== Eerste Klasse West-II ===
Pos	Team	Pld	W	D	L	GF	GA	GD	Pts	Qualification
1	HBS Craeyenhout	18	13	3	2	45	14	+31	29	Qualified for Championship play-off
2	Stormvogels	18	10	6	2	39	19	+20	26	Division West-I next season
3	AFC Ajax	18	9	5	4	51	25	+26	23	
4	RCH	18	10	2	6	47	39	+8	22	Division West-I next season
5	HFC EDO	18	9	3	6	37	32	+5	21	
6	SBV Excelsior	18	7	1	10	29	44	−15	15	
7	HVV Den Haag	18	5	4	9	32	39	−7	14	Division West-I next season
8	DFC	18	5	3	10	37	46	−9	13	Division West-I next season
9	UVV Utrecht	18	4	3	11	20	49	−29	11	
10	VOC	18	2	2	14	32	62	−30	6	Division West-I next season

Source: rsssf.com

=== Championship play-off ===
Pos	Team	Pld	W	D	L	GF	GA	GD	Pts	HBS	NAC	SPA	GOA	FRI
1	HBS Craeyenhout	8	7	1	0	22	8	+14	15		4–1	5–3	4–2	3–0
2	NAC	8	5	1	2	22	12	+10	11	0–2		2–2	6–2	4–1
3	Sparta Rotterdam	8	4	1	3	18	12	+6	9	1–2	0–2		2–0	7–0
4	Go Ahead	8	2	0	6	17	22	−5	4	0–1	1–4	1–2		9–2
5	LAC Frisia 1883	8	0	1	7	5	30	−25	1	1–1	0–3	0–1	1–2	

Source: rsssf.com
