= DSV Concordia =

Dutch sports club

Coordinates: 52.0306°N 4.3723°E

- Full name: Delftse Sport Vereniging Concordia
- Nickname: De Club van Jan Thomée (The club of Jan Thomée)
- Founded: October 15, 1885; 140 years ago
- Ground: Sportpark Brasserskade; Delft
- Website: http://www.concordiadelft.nl/

DSV Concordia is a multi-sport club in Delft, the Netherlands founded 1885. The club introduced Jan Thomée to the world when he became the leading football goal scorer for the Netherlands and played in the 1908 Summer Olympics as part of the Dutch team that won the bronze medal.

== Current sports ==
Cricket, football, golf, and tennis are the four official sports played in the club.

=== Notable players ===
The following player was called up to represent his national team in international football and received caps during his tenure with Concordia:

- (Netherlands) Jan Thomée (1906–1912)

== Trivia ==
- The club "yell" is intricately connected to one of the most famous Concordians who was a chairman of the club for 18 years.
