= Henk Grim =

Dutch footballer (born 1962)

Personal information
- Date of birth: 1 April 1962 (age 64)
- Place of birth: Groesbeek, Netherlands
- Position: Forward

Youth career
- 1968–1980: De Treffers

Senior career*
Years	Team	Apps	(Gls)
1980–1981	De Treffers		
1982–1987	NEC	131	(59)
1987–1988	Den Bosch	48	(12)
1989	AZ	15	(6)
1989–1990	Den Bosch	18	(0)
1990–1992	NEC	34	(1)
1992–1994	De Treffers		
Total		246	(78)
- * Club domestic league appearances and goals

Henk Grim (born 1 April 1962) is a Dutch former professional footballer who played for De Treffers, NEC, Den Bosch and AZ, as a forward.

== Playing career ==
Born in nearby Groesbeek, Grim totalled 241 official matches for NEC, scoring 88 times. He was the 1986–87 Eerste Divisie top goalscorer with 29 goals.

== Scout ==
After retiring as a player, he worked as a scout, working at NEC between 1997 and 2012, rising to become head scout.

He became head scout at De Treffers in 2015, combining that position with a role at German club FC St. Pauli. Grim also has his own scouting course company.
