= List of Belgian football champions =

The Belgian football champions are the winners of the highest association football league in Belgium, currently called the Belgian Pro League and historically the Belgian First Division.

== List of champions ==
Season	Winner	Runner-up	Third place
1895–96	FC Liégeois (1)	Antwerp FC	SC de Bruxelles
1896–97	Racing de Bruxelles (1)	FC Liégeois	R Antwerp FC
1897–98	FC Liégeois (2)	Racing de Bruxelles	Léopold Club
1898–99	FC Liégeois (3)	FC Brugeois	Racing de Bruxelles and CS Bruges
1899–1900	Racing de Bruxelles (2)	FC Brugeois	R Antwerp FC and CS Bruges
1900–01	Racing de Bruxelles (3)	K Beerschot VAC	Léopold Club
1901–02	Racing de Bruxelles (4)	Léopold Club	R Union Saint-Gilloise
1902–03	Racing de Bruxelles (5)	R Union Saint-Gilloise	K Beerschot VAC
1903–04	R Union Saint-Gilloise (1)	Racing de Bruxelles	FC Brugeois
1904–05	R Union Saint-Gilloise (2)	Racing de Bruxelles	FC Brugeois
1905–06	R Union Saint-Gilloise (3)	FC Brugeois	Racing de Bruxelles
1906–07	R Union Saint-Gilloise (4)	Racing de Bruxelles	FC Brugeois
1907–08	Racing de Bruxelles (6)	R Union Saint-Gilloise	FC Brugeois
1908–09	R Union Saint-Gilloise (5)	Daring Club de Bruxelles SR	FC Brugeois
1909–10	R Union Saint-Gilloise (6)	FC Brugeois	CS Brugeois
1910–11	CS Brugeois (1)	FC Brugeois	Daring Club de Bruxelles SR
1911–12	Daring Club de Bruxelles (1)	U Saint-Gilloise	Racing de Bruxelles
1912–13	R Union Saint-Gilloise (7)	Daring Club de Bruxelles	Racing de Bruxelles
1913–14	Daring Club de Bruxelles (2)	R Union Saint-Gilloise	CS Brugeois
1915–1919	League suspended due to the First World War		
1919–20	FC Brugeois (1)	U Saint-Gilloise	Daring Club de Bruxelles SR
1920–21	Daring Club de Bruxelles SR (3)	R Union Saint-Gilloise	K Beerschot VAC
1921–22	K Beerschot VAC (1)	R Union Saint-Gilloise	R Antwerp FC
1922–23	R Union Saint-Gilloise (8)	K Beerschot VAC	CS Brugeois
1923–24	K Beerschot VAC (2)	R Union Saint-Gilloise SR	CS Brugeois
1924–25	K Beerschot VAC (3)	R Antwerp FC	R Union Saint-Gilloise SR
1925–26	K Beerschot VAC (4)	R Standard Liège	Daring Club de Bruxelles SR
1926–27	RCS Brugeois (2)	K Beerschot VAC	R Standard Liège
1927–28	K Beerschot VAC (5)	R Standard Liège	RCS Brugeois
1928–29	R Antwerp FC (1)	K Beerschot VAC	RC de Malines
1929–30	RCS Brugeois (3)	R Antwerp FC	RC de Malines
1930–31	R Antwerp FC (2)	RFC Malinois	K Berchem Sport
1931–32	K Liersche SK (1)	R Antwerp FC	R Union Saint-Gilloise
1932–33	R Union Saint-Gilloise (9)	R Antwerp FC	RCS Brugeois
1933–34	R Union Saint-Gilloise (10)	Daring Club de Bruxelles SR	R Standard Liège
1934–35	R Union Saint-Gilloise (11)	K Liersche SK	Daring Club de Bruxelles SR
1935–36	Daring Club de Bruxelles SR (4)	R Standard Liège	R Union Saint-Gilloise
1936–37	Daring Club de Bruxelles SR (5)	K Beerschot VAC	R Union Saint-Gilloise
1937–38	R Beerschot AC (6)	Daring Club de Bruxelles SR	U Saint-Gilloise
1938–39	R Beerschot AC (7)	K Liersche SK	ROC de Charleroi
1939–1941	League suspended due to the Second World War		
1941–42	K Liersche SK (2)	R Beerschot AC	R Antwerp FC
1942–43	RFC Malinois (1)	R Beerschot AC	K Liersche SK
1943–44	R Antwerp FC (3)	RSC Anderlechtois	R Beerschot AC
1944–1945	League suspended due to the Second World War		
1945–46	RFC Malinois (2)	R Antwerp FC	RSC Anderlechtois
1946–47	RSC Anderlechtois (1)	ROC de Charleroi	RFC Malinois
1947–48	RFC Malinois (3)	RSC Anderlechtois	RFC Liège
1948–49	RSC Anderlechtois (2)	R Berchem Sport	R Standard Liège
1949–50	RSC Anderlechtois (3)	R Berchem Sport	RC Mechelen KM
1950–51	RSC Anderlechtois (4)	R Berchem Sport	RC Mechelen KM
1951–52	RFC Liège (4)	RC Mechelen KM	R Antwerp FC
1952–53	RFC Liège (5)	RSC Anderlechtois	R Beerschot AC
1953–54	RSC Anderlechtois (5)	KFC Malinois	ARA La Gantoise
1954–55	RSC Anderlechtois (6)	ARA La Gantoise	R Standard Liège
1955–56	RSC Anderlechtois (7)	R Antwerp FC	R Union Saint-Gilloise
1956–57	R Antwerp FC (4)	RSC Anderlechtois	ARA La Gantoise
1957–58	R Standard Liège (1)	R Antwerp FC	ARA La Gantoise
1958–59	RSC Anderlechtois (8)	RFC Liège	R Standard Liège
1959–60	K Lierse SK (3)	RSC Anderlechtois	K Waterschei SV Thor
1960–61	R Standard Liège (2)	RFC Liège	RSC Anderlechtois
1961–62	RSC Anderlechtois (9)	R Standard Liège	R Antwerp FC
1962–63	R Standard Liège (3)	R Antwerp FC	RSC Anderlechtois
1963–64	RSC Anderlechtois (10)	K Beeringen FC	R Standard Liège
1964–65	RSC Anderlechtois (11)	R Standard Liège	R Beerschot AC
1965–66	RSC Anderlechtois (12)	K Sint-Truidense VV	R Standard Liège
1966–67	RSC Anderlechtois (13)	RFC Brugeois	RFC Liège
1967–68	RSC Anderlechtois (14)	RFC Brugeois	R Standard Liège
1968–69	R Standard Liège (4)	R Charleroi SC	K Lierse SK
1969–70	R Standard Liège (5)	RFC Brugeois	ARA La Gantoise
1970–71	R Standard Liège (6)	RFC Brugeois	RSC Anderlechtois
1971–72	RSC Anderlechtois (15)	RFC Brugeois	R Standard Liège
1972–73	Club Brugge KV (2)	R Standard CL	RR White
1973–74	RSC Anderlechtois (16)	R Antwerp FC	R White Daring Molenbeek
1974–75	R White Daring Molenbeek (1)	R Antwerp FC	RSC Anderlechtois
1975–76	Club Brugge KV (3)	RSC Anderlechtois	R White Daring Molenbeek
1976–77	Club Brugge KV (4)	RSC Anderlechtois	R Standard Liège
1977–78	Club Brugge KV (5)	RSC Anderlechtois	R Standard Liège
1978–79	KSK Beveren (1)	RSC Anderlechtois	R Standard Liège
1979–80	Club Brugge KV (6)	R Standard Liège	R White Daring Molenbeek
1980–81	RSC Anderlechtois (17)	KSC Lokeren	R Standard Liège
1981–82	R Standard Liège (7)	RSC Anderlechtois	KAA Gent
1982–83	R Standard Liège (8)	RSC Anderlechtois	R Antwerp FC
1983–84	KSK Beveren (2)	RSC Anderlechtois	Club Brugge KV
1984–85	RSC Anderlechtois (18)	Club Brugge	RFC Liège
1985–86	RSC Anderlechtois (19)	Club Brugge KV	R Standard Liège
1986–87	RSC Anderlechtois (20)	KV Mechelen	Club Brugge KV
1987–88	Club Brugge KV (7)	KV Mechelen	R Antwerp FC
1988–89	KV Mechelen (4)	RSC Anderlechtois	RFC Liège
1989–90	Club Brugge KV (8)	RSC Anderlechtois	KV Mechelen
1990–91	RSC Anderlechtois (21)	KV Mechelen	KAA Gent
1991–92	Club Brugge KV (9)	RSC Anderlechtois	R Standard Liège
1992–93	RSC Anderlecht (22)	R Standard Liège	KV Mechelen
1993–94	RSC Anderlecht (23)	Club Brugge KV	RFC Seraing
1994–95	RSC Anderlecht (24)	R Standard Liège	Club Brugge KV
1995–96	Club Brugge KV (10)	RSC Anderlecht	KFC Germinal Ekeren
1996–97	K Lierse SK (4)	Club Brugge KV	R Excelsior Mouscron
1997–98	Club Brugge KV (11)	KRC Genk	KFC Germinal Ekeren
1998–99	KRC Genk (1)	Club Brugge KV	RSC Anderlecht
1999–2000	RSC Anderlecht (25)	Club Brugge KV	KAA Gent
2000–01	RSC Anderlecht (26)	Club Brugge KV	R Standard Liège
2001–02	KRC Genk (2)	Club Brugge KV	RSC Anderlecht
2002–03	Club Brugge KV (12)	RSC Anderlecht	KSC Lokeren
2003–04	RSC Anderlecht (27)	Club Brugge KV	R Standard Liège
2004–05	Club Brugge KV (13)	RSC Anderlecht	KRC Genk
2005–06	RSC Anderlecht (28)	R Standard Liège	Club Brugge KV
2006–07	RSC Anderlecht (29)	KRC Genk	R Standard Liège
2007–08	R Standard Liège (9)	RSC Anderlecht	Club Brugge KV
2008–09	R Standard Liège (10)	RSC Anderlecht	Club Brugge KV
2009–10	RSC Anderlecht (30)	KAA Gent	Club Brugge KV
2010–11	KRC Genk (3)	R Standard Liège	RSC Anderlecht
2011–12	RSC Anderlecht (31)	Club Brugge KV	KRC Genk
2012–13	RSC Anderlecht (32)	SV Zulte Waregem	Club Brugge KV
2013–14	RSC Anderlecht (33)	R Standard Liège	Club Brugge KV
2014–15	KAA Gent (1)	Club Brugge KV	RSC Anderlecht
2015–16	Club Brugge KV (14)	RSC Anderlecht	KAA Gent
2016–17	RSC Anderlecht (34)	Club Brugge KV	KAA Gent
2017–18	Club Brugge KV (15)	R Standard Liège	RSC Anderlecht
2018–19	KRC Genk (4)	Club Brugge KV	R Standard Liège
2019–20 (Note: 2019–20 Belgian First Division A suspended in March 2020 due to the COVID-19 pandemic in Belgium; season curtailed - without the usual playoffs taking place - and final standings declared (including Club Brugge as champions) on 15 May 2020.)	Club Brugge KV (16)	KAA Gent	R Charleroi SC
2020–21	Club Brugge KV (17)	KRC Genk	R Antwerp FC
2021–22	Club Brugge KV (18)	R Union Saint-Gilloise	RSC Anderlecht
2022–23	R Antwerp FC (5)	KRC Genk	R Union Saint-Gilloise
2023–24	Club Brugge KV (19)	R Union Saint-Gilloise	RSC Anderlecht
2024–25	R Union Saint-Gilloise (12)	Club Brugge KV	KRC Genk
2025–26	Club Brugge KV (20)	R Union Saint-Gilloise	Sint-Truidense VV

== Total titles won by club ==
Club	Winners	Winning years
**RSC Anderlecht**	34	1946–47, 1948–49, 1949–50, 1950–51, 1953–54, 1954–55, 1955–56, 1958–59, 1961–62, 1963–64, 1964–65, 1965–66, 1966–67, 1967–68, 1971–72, 1973–74, 1980–81, 1984–85, 1985–86, 1986–87, 1990–91, 1992–93, 1993–94, 1994–95, 1999–2000, 2000–01, 2003–04, 2005–06, 2006–07, 2009–10, 2011–12, 2012–13, 2013–14, 2016–17
**Club Brugge KV**	20	1919–20, 1972–73, 1975–76, 1976–77, 1977–78, 1979–80, 1987–88, 1989–90, 1991–92, 1995–96, 1997–98, 2002–03, 2004–05, 2015–16, 2017–18, 2019–20, 2020–21, 2021–22, 2023–24, 2025–26
**R Union Saint-Gilloise**	12	1903–04, 1904–05, 1905–06, 1906–07, 1908–09, 1909–10, 1912–13, 1922–23, 1932–33, 1933–34, 1934–35, 2024–25
**R Standard Liège**	10	1957–58, 1960–61, 1962–63, 1968–69, 1969–70, 1970–71, 1981–82, 1982–83, 2007–08, 2008–09
K Beerschot VAC	7	1921–22, 1923–24, 1924–25, 1925–26, 1927–28, 1937–38, 1938–39
Racing de Bruxelles	6	1896–97, 1899–1900, 1900–01, 1901–02, 1902–03, 1907–08
**R Antwerp FC**	5	1928–29, 1930–31, 1943–44, 1956–57, 2022–23
RFC Liège	5	1895–96, 1897–98, 1898–99, 1951–52, 1952–53
Daring de Bruxelles	5	1911–12, 1913–14, 1920–21, 1935–36, 1936–37
**KV Mechelen**	4	1942–43, 1945–46, 1947–48, 1988–89
Lierse SK	4	1931–32, 1941–42, 1959–60, 1996–97
**KRC Genk**	4	1998–99, 2001–02, 2010–11, 2018–19
**Cercle Brugge KSV**	3	1910–11, 1926–27, 1929–30
KSK Beveren	2	1978–79, 1983–84
**KAA Gent**	1	2014–15
RWD Molenbeek	1	1974–75

- **Bold** - clubs play in the current top flight league.
- Italic - clubs dissolved or merged.
Titles won by club (%)
1. RSC Anderlecht – 34 (28.1%)
2. Club Brugge KV - 19 (15.7%)
3. R Union Saint-Gilloise – 12 (9.09%)
4. Standard Liège - 10 (8.26%)
5. K Beerschot VAC - 7 (5.79%)
6. Racing de Bruxelles - 6 (4.96%)
7. R Antwerp FC - 5 (4.13%)
8. RFC Liège - 5 (4.13%)
9. Daring de Bruxelles - 5 (4.13%)
10. KV Mechelen - 4 (3.31%)
11. Lierse SK - 4 (3.31%)
12. KRC Genk - 4 (3.31%)
13. Cercle Brugge KSV - 3 (2.48%)
14. KSK Beveren - 2 (1.65%)
15. KAA Gent - 1 (0.83%)
16. RWD Molenbeek - 1 (0.83%)

== Total titles won by town or city ==
Sixteen clubs have been champions, from a total of nine towns and cities.

Place	Titles	Clubs
Brussels	58	RSC Anderlecht (34), R Union Saint-Gilloise (12), Racing Bruxelles (6), Daring Bruxelles (5), RWDM (1)
Bruges	23	Club Brugge KV (20), Cercle Brugge KSV (3)
Liège	15	R Standard Liège (10), RFC Liège (5)
Antwerp	12	Beerschot VAC (7), R Antwerp FC (5)
Lier	4	K Lierse SK (4)
Mechelen	4	KV Mechelen (4)
Genk	4	KRC Genk (4)
Beveren	2	KSK Beveren (2)
Ghent	1	KAA Gent (1)

== See also ==
- List of Belgian women's football champions
- Football in Belgium
- Belgian football league system
