= Jef Mermans =

Belgian footballer

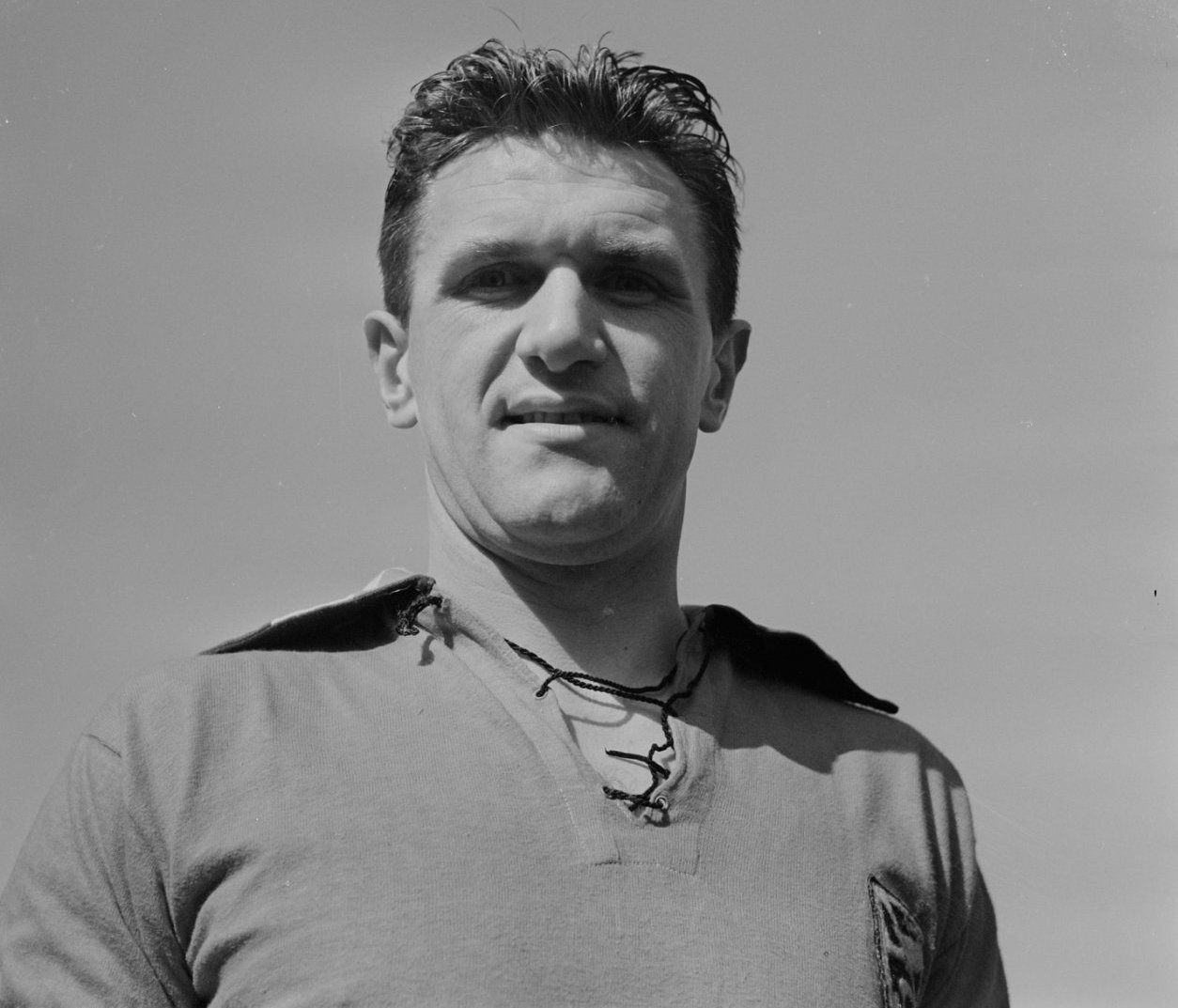
- Mermans with Belgium in 1953

Personal information
- Full name: Josephus Antoon Louisa Mermans
- Date of birth: 16 February 1922
- Place of birth: Merksem, Belgium
- Date of death: 20 January 1996 (aged 73)
- Place of death: Wildert, Belgium
- Position: Striker

Youth career
- 1932–1937: Tubantia FAC

Senior career*
Years	Team	Apps	(Gls)
1937–1942	Tubantia FAC	93	(65)
1942–1957	Anderlecht	382	(339)
1957–1960	Merksem SC	81	(41)
Total		556	(445)

International career
1945–1956	Belgium	56	(28)
- * Club domestic league appearances and goals

Josephus Antoon Louisa "Jef" Mermans (16 February 1922 – 20 January 1996), nicknamed "The Bomber", was a football striker from Belgium, who played much of his career at Anderlecht, with whom he won seven Belgian Championship titles and finished top scorer of this competition three times. He played 405 games and scored 369 goals for Anderlecht, making him the club's all time topscorer.

Mermans played 56 matches with the Belgium national football team, 2 of which were in the 1954 FIFA World Cup. He is also the 6th top scorer ever for the Belgium national team with 27 goals.

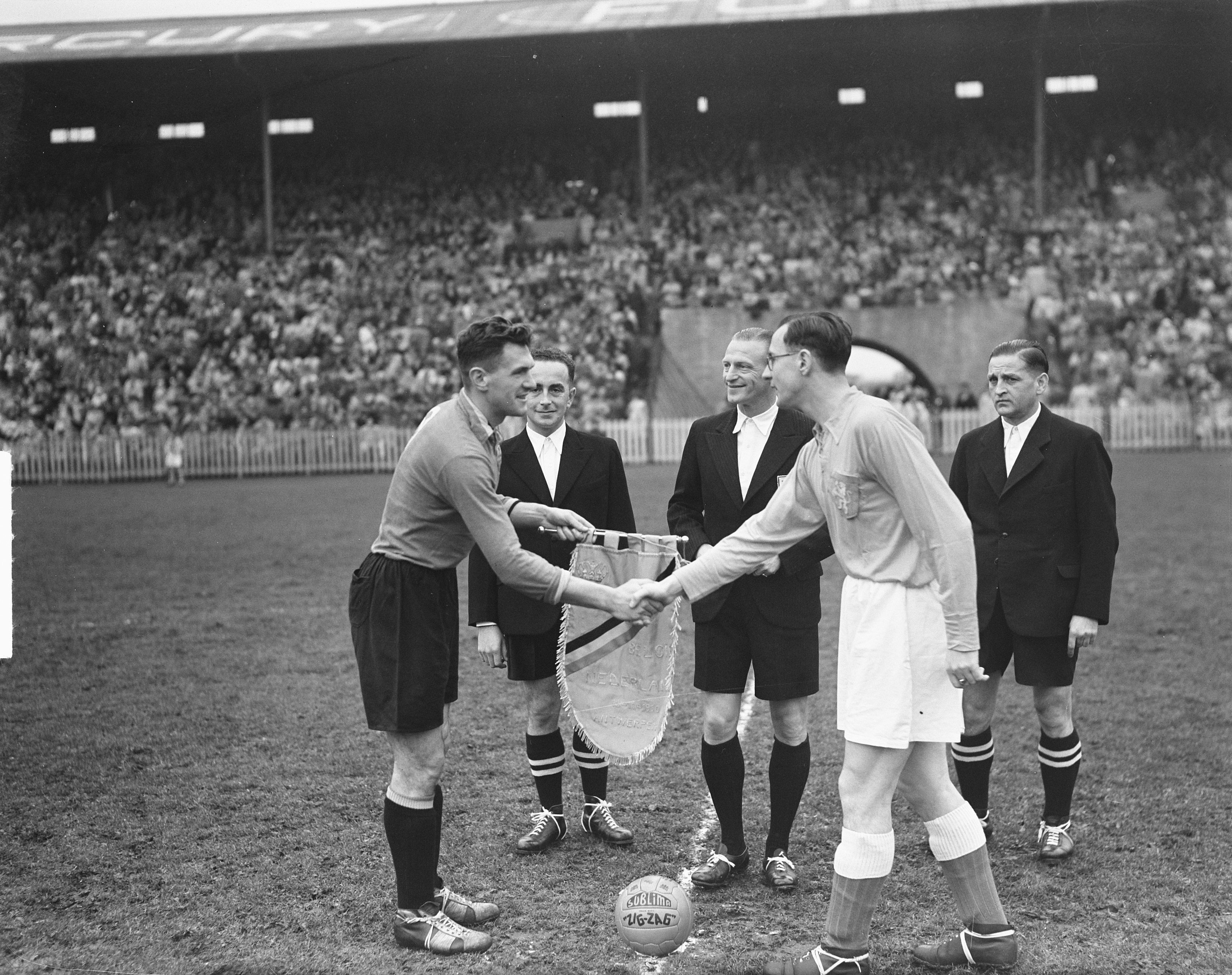
Mermans on the left, as captain of the Belgium team in November 1950

Mermans was born in Merksem and died in Wildert.

== Early career ==
In the early 1930s, the young Mermans, along with a couple of friends, could not afford to become members of FC Antwerp. Eventually, the boys tried their luck at Tubantia F.A.C., a small club in the Antwerp suburb, and forced themselves into the youth team.

Five years later, Mermans entered the first team. His progress caught the attention of the federal coach and Jef was selected for a Belgium B squad match against Luxembourg in January 1939. At this point, he received a proposal to play in the Beerschot team twice in two years, but Tubantia Borgerhout refused.

A member of the Anderlecht staff arrived at Borgerhout in 1942 with a blank check that was filled in with the record sum of 125,000 Belgian francs in a quarter of an hour.

== Anderlecht career ==
On his arrival at Anderlecht, the Championship was quite erratic due to the World War II, but he helped Anderlecht in becoming a regular team. In 1947, Mermans was the key player in the conquest of the first Anderlecht title in first division as he scored 38 goals (succeeding to Bert De Cleyn as top scorer). He was top European goalscorer of the season 1949-1950 netting 37 goals. At the peak of his career, Anderlecht received offers from A.S. Roma, Torino Calcio, Atalanta Bergamo, Real Madrid, S.S. Lazio and Atlético Madrid but refused them all.

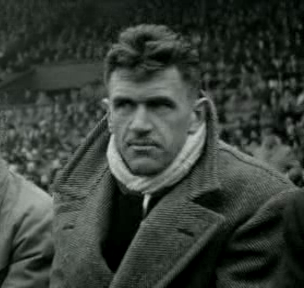
Jef Mermans, 3 April 1955

== Late career ==
In 1957, the Bomber, as he was called for his powerful strikes, left Anderlecht for the small K. Olse Merksem club in his native town. With him, the club promoted from 3rd to 2nd division and even finished 4th in 1960 for its first season at this level. Later on, the club was renamed Olse Mermans to celebrate the player.

== Career statistics ==
=== Club ===
Appearances and goals by club, season and competition
Club	Season	League		
Club	Season	Division	Apps	Goals
Tubantia Borgerhout	1937–38	Belgian Second Division	18	8
Tubantia Borgerhout	1938–39	Belgian Second Division	22	9
Tubantia Borgerhout	1939–40	Belgian Second Division	17	14
Tubantia Borgerhout	1940–41	Belgian Second Division	19	14
Tubantia Borgerhout	1941–42	Belgian Second Division	17	20
Tubantia Borgerhout	Total		93	65
Anderlecht	1941–42	Belgian First Division	1	1
Anderlecht	1942–43	Belgian First Division	30	23
Anderlecht	1943–44	Belgian First Division	30	33
Anderlecht	1945–46	Belgian First Division	27	32
Anderlecht	1946–47	Belgian First Division	34	38
Anderlecht	1947–48	Belgian First Division	26	23
Anderlecht	1948–49	Belgian First Division	27	17
Anderlecht	1949–50	Belgian First Division	28	37
Anderlecht	1950–51	Belgian First Division	21	17
Anderlecht	1951–52	Belgian First Division	26	19
Anderlecht	1952–53	Belgian First Division	27	24
Anderlecht	1953–54	Belgian First Division	30	21
Anderlecht	1954–55	Belgian First Division	29	23
Anderlecht	1955–56	Belgian First Division	24	19
Anderlecht	1956–57	Belgian First Division	22	12
Anderlecht	Total		382	339
Olse Merksem	1958–59	Belgian Third Division	26	11
Olse Merksem	1959–60	Belgian Third Division	26	20
Olse Merksem	1960–61	Belgian Third Division	29	10
Olse Merksem	Total		81	41
Career total			556	445

Note: The goals that Mermans scored in the games of the uncompleted 1944-45 season are not taken into account.

=== International ===
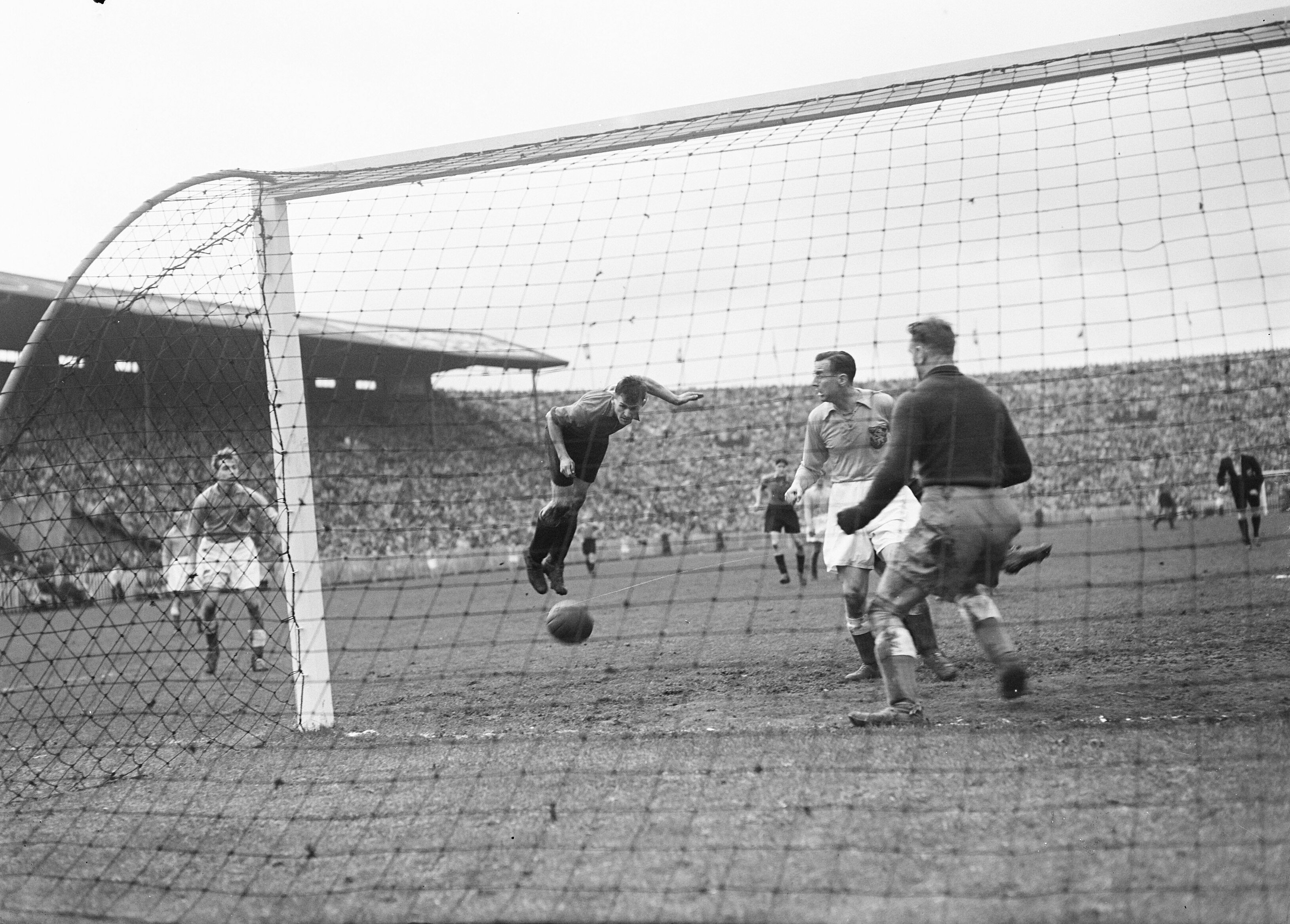
Mermans scoring for Belgium in a 7–2 win over the Netherlands (Antwerp, 1950)

Appearances and goals by national team and year
National team	Year	Apps	Goals
Belgium	1945	1	0
Belgium	1946	2	0
Belgium	1947	3	1
Belgium	1948	6	3
Belgium	1949	7	4
Belgium	1950	7	12
Belgium	1951	6	1
Belgium	1952	5	2
Belgium	1953	5	1
Belgium	1954	8	3
Belgium	1955	4	0
Belgium	1956	3	1
Total		56	28

List of international goals scored by Jef Mermans
No.	Cap	Date	Venue	Opponent	Score	Result	Competition
1.	5	21 September 1947	Heysel Stadium, Brussels	England	1–3	2–5	Friendly
2.	8	18 April 1948	De Kuip, Rotterdam	Netherlands	1–1	2–2	Friendly
3.	10	6 June 1948	Heysel Stadium, Brussels	France	3–2	4–2	Friendly
4.	11	17 October 1948	Stade Yves-du-Manoir, Colombes	France	1–2	3–3	Friendly
5.	14	13 March 1949	Olympic Stadium, Amsterdam	Netherlands	2–0	3–3	Friendly
6.	14	13 March 1949	Olympic Stadium, Amsterdam	Netherlands	3–3	3–3	Friendly
7.	15	24 April 1949	Dalymount Park, Dublin	Republic of Ireland	2–0	2–0	Friendly
8.	17	2 October 1949	Heysel Stadium, Brussels	Switzerland	3–0	3–0	Friendly
9.	21	16 April 1950	Bosuilstadion, Antwerp	Netherlands	1–0	2–0	Friendly
10.	22	10 May 1950	Heysel Stadium, Brussels	Republic of Ireland	1–0	5–1	Friendly
11.	22	10 May 1950	Heysel Stadium, Brussels	Republic of Ireland	3–0	5–1	Friendly
12.	22	10 May 1950	Heysel Stadium, Brussels	Republic of Ireland	5–1	5–1	Friendly
13.	23	18 May 1950	Heysel Stadium, Brussels	England	1–0	1–4	Friendly
14.	24	4 June 1950	Heysel Stadium, Brussels	France	1–0	4–1	Friendly
15.	24	4 June 1950	Heysel Stadium, Brussels	France	3–1	4–1	Friendly
16.	24	4 June 1950	Heysel Stadium, Brussels	France	4–1	4–1	Friendly
17.	25	1 November 1950	Stade Yves-du-Manoir, Colombes	France	2–0	3–3	Friendly
18.	25	1 November 1950	Stade Yves-du-Manoir, Colombes	France	3–2	3–3	Friendly
19.	26	12 November 1950	Bosuilstadion, Antwerp	Netherlands	2–0	7–2	Friendly
20.	26	12 November 1950	Bosuilstadion, Antwerp	Netherlands	5–1	7–2	Friendly
21.	27	15 April 1951	Olympic Stadium, Amsterdam	Netherlands	2–1	4–5	Friendly
22.	34	22 May 1952	Heysel Stadium, Brussels	France	1–2	1–2	Friendly
23.	35	19 October 1952	Bosuilstadion, Antwerp	Netherlands	2–1	2–1	Friendly
24.	41	22 November 1953	Hardturm, Zurich	Switzerland	1–0	2–2	Friendly
25.	43	4 April 1954	Bosuilstadion, Antwerp	Netherlands	1–0	4–0	Friendly
26.	44	4 April 1954	Stadion Maksimir, Zagreb	Yugoslavia	2–0	2–0	Friendly
27.	45	30 May 1954	Heysel Stadium, Brussels	France	1–0	3–3	Friendly
28.	54	11 March 1956	Heysel Stadium, Brussels	France	1–1	1–3	Friendly

== Honours ==
RSC Anderlecht

- Belgian First Division: 1946–47, 1948–49, 1949–50, 1950–51, 1953–54, 1954–55, 1955–56; runners-up: 1943–44, 1947–48, 1952–53, 1956–57

Olse Merksem

- Belgian Third Division: 1958–59

Individual

- Belgian First Division top scorer: 1946–47 (39 goals), 1947–48 (23 goals), 1949–50 (37 goals)
- European topscorer: 1949–50 (37 goals)
- World League topscorer: 1949–50
- Belgian Silver Shoe: 1954
- Belgian Bronze Shoe: 1955
- Golden Medal of Sports Merit: 1955
- Belgian Golden Shoe of the 20th Century (1995): 9th place
- A stadium, Jef Mermansstadion in Merksem.

== Books ==
- Mijn voetbal en ik by Jef Mermans in 1952, Uitgeverij STADION 126 p. (Dutch)
- Joseph Mermans - L Anderlechtois aux ... 50 capes! by Marcel Grosjean in 1954, 36 p. (French)
- Eeuwige 25: Anderlecht: van Jef Mermans tot Vincent Kompany by Raf Willems in 2019, Willems Uitgevers, 107 p. (Dutch, French) ISBN 9789492419651
- Jef Mermans. Bombardier: de voetballer die Anderlecht naar de top loodste by Stefan van Loock in 2022, Willems Uitgevers, 276 p. (Dutch) ISBN 9789493242586

== See also ==
- List of men's footballers with 500 or more goals
