= Albert De Cleyn =

Belgian footballer

Bert De Cleyn

Personal information
- Full name: Albert Antonia Gustaaf De Cleyn
- Date of birth: 28 June 1917
- Place of birth: Mechelen, Belgium
- Date of death: 13 September 1990 (aged 73)
- Place of death: Belgium
- Position: Striker

Senior career*
Years	Team	Apps	(Gls)
1933–1955	KV Mechelen	488	(377)

International career
1946–1948	Belgium	12	(9)

Managerial career
- 1955–1957: KV Mechelen
- * Club domestic league appearances and goals

Albert Antonia Gustaaf "Bert" De Cleyn (28 June 1917 – 13 September 1990) was a Belgian football player who became the first top scorer of the Belgian First Division with 40 goals in 1946 while playing for Mechelen.

He played 12 times with the Belgium national team between 1946 and 1948. De Cleyn made his international debut on 19 January 1946 in a 2-0 friendly defeat to England.

According to the RSSSF, during his career (1933–1955) he scored a total of 431 top league goals, which is the 5th best tally in European top league football, being bettered only by the likes of Josef Bican, Ferenc Puskas, Cristiano Ronaldo and Lionel Messi.

== Honours ==
=== Club ===
KV Mechelen

- Belgian First Division: 3

1943, 1946, 1948

=== Individual ===
- Belgian First Division top scorer: 1942 (34 goals), 1946 (40 goals)
- Most goals in the Belgian First Division ever (377 goals)
- Most goals in a Belgian First Division game (7 goals) in a 7-1 victory against Racing de Bruxelles

Note: De Cleyn scored 19 goals in the unofficial competition of 1940-41, and 25 goals in 17 games in the uncompleted 1944-45 season.
