= 1944–45 in Belgian football =

Football in Belgium
- Season: 1944–45

The national football competitions in Belgium were stopped during the 1944–45 season due to World War II. RSC Anderlechtois was the leader of the Premier Division when it was stopped however not all teams had played the same number of matches Also, 4 clubs did not participate to that season: the title holders R Antwerp FC, R Beerschot AC, K Liersche SK and R Berchem Sport. The Belgium national football team played their first official match since 1940 on the 1944 Christmas Eve.

== Overview ==
At the end of the season, RRC de Bruxelles, K Boom FC and R Tilleur FC were promoted to the Premier Division, while the 4 clubs which did not take part in the 1943-44 Championship came back. No teams were relegated to Division I so the Premier Division was played with 19 clubs in 1945–46. Also in the lower divisions, the number of teams was increased from 16 to 17 in Division I A, from 15 to 18 in Division I B, from 14 to 18 in Promotion A, 16 to 19 in Promotion B, 14 to 18 in Promotion C and 16 to 18 in Promotion D.

== National team ==
| Date | Venue | Opponents | Score* | Comp | Belgium scorers |
|---|---|---|---|---|---|
| December 24, 1944 | Parc des Princes, Paris (A) | France | 1-3 | F | François De Wael |
| April 21, 1940 | Stade Municipal, Luxembourg (A) | Luxembourg | 1-4 | F | Léon Gillaux |

* Belgium score given first

Key

- H = Home match
- A = Away match
- N = On neutral ground
- F = Friendly
- o.g. = own goal
