= 1945–46 in Belgian football =

Football in Belgium
- Season: 1945–46

The 1945–46 season was the 43rd season of competitive football in Belgium. RFC Malinois won their second Premier Division title. The Belgium national football team played their first match at Wembley against England. This was the first season when the Premier Division top scorer ranking was published, with Albert De Cleyn of champion RFC Malinois finishing as top scorer with 40 goals. During the same season, De Cleyn scored 7 goals with Belgium, 5 of which in a game against Luxembourg.

== Overview ==
At the end of the season, R Tilleur FC and RCS Brugeois were relegated to Division I, while RFC Brugeois (Division I A winner) and K Lyra (Division I B winner) were promoted to Premier Division.

UC Centre, Stade Nivellois, Waterschei SV Thor, Belgica FC Edegem and CS Andennais were relegated from Division I to Promotion, to be replaced by SC Menen, Mol Sport, Cappellen FC and Stade Waremmien.

== National team ==
| Date | Venue | Opponents | Score* | Comp | Belgium scorers |
|---|---|---|---|---|---|
| December 15, 1945 | Stade Oscar Bossaert, Brussels (H) | France | 2-1 | Friendly | François Sermon (2) |
| January 19, 1946 | Wembley Stadium, London (A) | England | 0-2 | Victory International |
| January 23, 1946 | Hampden Park, Glasgow (A) | Scotland | 2-2 | Victory International | Victor Lemberechts, Frédéric Chaves d'Aguilar |
| February 23, 1946 | Stade Communal, Charleroi (H) | Luxembourg | 7-0 | Friendly | Albert De Cleyn (5), Henri Coppens, Victor Lemberechts |
| May 12, 1946 | Olympic Stadium, Amsterdam (A) | The Netherlands | 3-6 | Friendly | Albert De Cleyn (2), Henri Coppens |
| May 30, 1946 | Olympisch Stadion, Antwerp (H) | The Netherlands | 2-2 | Friendly | Victor Lemberechts, Michel Van Varenberg |

* Belgium score given first

Key

- H = Home match
- A = Away match
- N = On neutral ground
- F = Friendly
- o.g. = own goal

== Honours ==
| Competition | Winner |
|---|---|
| Premier Division | RFC Malinois |
| Division I | RFC Brugeois and K Lyra |
| Promotion | SC Menen, Mol Sport, Cappellen FC and Stade Waremmien |

== Final league tables ==
=== Premier Division ===
Top scorer: Albert De Cleyn (RFC Malinois) with 40 goals.
