= Jef Andries =

Belgian association football player (1919–2006)

Personal information
- Date of birth: 18 January 1919
- Place of birth: Sint-Katelijne-Waver, Belgium
- Date of death: 26 September 2006 (aged 87)
- Place of death: Duffel, Belgium
- Position: Forward

Senior career*
Years	Team	Apps	(Gls)
1936–1955	Mechelen	382	(5)

International career
1948	Belgium	0	(0)
- * Club domestic league appearances and goals

Jef Andries (18 January 1919 – 26 September 2006) was a Belgian footballer. He played for Mechelen from 1936 until 1955.

== Biography ==
Andries grew up in the hamlet of Elzestraat in Sint-Katelijne-Waver. In the 1940s he became one of the star players of FC Malinois, where he played on the right wing. With this team he became national champion in the 1942–43, 1945–46 and 1947–48 seasons. He was also selected four times for the Red Devils, without playing a single international match.

He died at the age of 87 in the hospital of Duffel.

== Honours ==
=== Club ===
Mechelen

- Belgian First Division A: 1942–43, 1945–46, 1947–48
