= Jean Van Steen =

Belgian footballer

Personal information
- Date of birth: 2 June 1929
- Place of birth: Belgium
- Date of death: 28 February 2013 (aged 83)
- Place of death: Belgium
- Position: Midfielder

Senior career*
Years	Team	Apps	(Gls)
1949–1950	Willebroekse SV	?	(?)
1950–1955	Anderlecht	?	(?)

International career
1951–1954	Belgium	5	(1)
- * Club domestic league appearances and goals

Jean Van Steen (2 June 1929 – 28 February 2013) was a Belgian former international footballer who played as a midfielder.

== Career ==
Van Steen played club football for Willebroekse SV and Anderlecht.

He earned a total of five caps for Belgium between 1951 and 1954, and participated at the 1954 FIFA World Cup.

== Honours ==
Anderlecht

- Belgian First Division: 1950–51, 1953–54, 1954–55
