= 1931–32 Belgian First Division =

32nd season of top-tier football in Belgium

Belgian First Division
- Season: 1931–32

Statistics of Belgian First Division in the 1931–32 season.

== Overview ==
Location of teams in Belgian First Division 1931–32

It was contested by 14 teams, and Lierse S.K. won the championship.

== League standings ==
Pos	Team	Pld	W	D	L	GF	GA	GD	Pts	Relegation
1	Lierse S.K.	26	16	5	5	86	51	+35	37	
2	Royal Antwerp FC	26	15	6	5	74	44	+30	36	
3	Royale Union Saint-Gilloise	26	13	3	10	51	48	+3	29	
4	Daring Club	26	9	10	7	59	53	+6	28	
5	K Berchem Sport	26	9	9	8	55	44	+11	27	
6	Cercle Brugge K.S.V.	26	11	5	10	60	57	+3	27	
7	Beerschot	26	9	8	9	48	44	+4	26	
8	RC de Gand	26	11	4	11	55	57	−2	26	
9	Standard Liège	26	11	4	11	71	74	−3	26	
10	KV Mechelen	26	11	3	12	57	53	+4	25	
11	Club Brugge K.V.	26	8	8	10	41	50	−9	24	
12	K.R.C. Mechelen	26	9	6	11	52	67	−15	24	
13	K. Tubantia Borgerhout V.K.	26	8	3	15	46	74	−28	19	Relegated to Division I
14	K.V. Turnhout	26	4	2	20	45	84	−39	10	Relegated to Division I

== Results ==
Home \ Away	ANT	BEE	BRC	CER	CLU	DAR	GAN	LIE	KVM	RCM	STA	TUB	TUR	USG
Antwerp		4–1	5–3	2–1	3–1	2–2	2–1	5–1	3–1	1–3	4–2	5–0	2–1	5–2
Beerschot	3–3		1–1	3–0	4–1	1–1	2–2	1–2	6–1	2–1	2–3	2–2	2–1	0–1
Berchem	1–1	1–1		3–1	1–2	2–3	2–2	0–0	0–2	5–3	2–2	7–1	1–3	1–2
Cercle Brugge	2–1	3–2	0–6		1–1	2–2	5–0	2–3	3–2	5–1	7–2	4–0	5–2	3–2
Club Brugge	1–1	1–1	1–1	4–2		1–1	3–1	1–1	3–0	1–2	4–1	2–4	1–0	2–0
Daring Club	2–2	1–2	0–0	2–3	1–1		4–4	3–3	2–0	8–1	2–1	4–2	1–0	2–4
Racing Gand	1–3	3–0	3–5	2–0	7–1	0–3		1–3	0–2	1–0	2–3	5–2	3–0	3–1
Lierse	4–3	3–2	4–1	3–1	4–0	7–2	2–3		4–4	5–2	8–2	3–3	5–0	3–1
KV Mechelen	1–3	0–2	3–2	1–1	2–1	3–0	2–2	1–0		4–1	6–1	1–2	7–0	0–1
K.R.C. Mechelen	2–2	0–1	1–1	2–2	2–1	2–5	3–0	2–8	4–5		4–2	2–0	5–2	3–2
Standard Liège	4–1	1–2	2–3	1–1	3–1	3–2	7–2	6–3	5–4	1–1		0–1	8–0	4–1
Tubantia	0–6	4–2	1–2	5–2	0–2	2–3	0–1	1–3	0–3	0–2	1–1		5–4	5–3
Turnhout	2–4	3–3	0–2	3–4	5–2	5–3	1–2	1–2	3–1	2–2	4–5	1–4		1–3
Union SG	2–1	1–0	0–2	2–0	2–2	0–0	1–4	3–2	4–1	1–1	6–1	4–1	2–1	

Legend: Blue = home team win; Yellow = draw; Red = away team win.
