= Gaël Kakudji =

Congolese footballer (born 1999)

Personal information
- Full name: Gaël Jean-Pierre Kakudji
- Date of birth: 6 July 1999 (age 27)
- Place of birth: Liège, Belgium
- Height: 1.92 m (6 ft 4 in)
- Position: Centre-back

Team information
- Current team: Crossing Schaerbeek
- Number: 47

Youth career
- 2012–2017: Seraing
- 2017–2018: Gent

Senior career*
Years	Team	Apps	(Gls)
2018–2020	Antwerp	1	(0)
2020–2022	Seraing		
2020–2021	→ RFC Liège (loan)	0	(0)
2021–2022	→ Olympic Charleroi (loan)	13	(1)
2022–2023	Eendracht Aalst	29	(3)
2023–2025	RAEC Mons	39	(4)
2025–	Crossing Schaerbeek	18	(3)

International career
2019	DR Congo U23	1	(0)
- * Club domestic league appearances and goals as of 28 June 2026

Gaël Jean-Pierre Kakudji (born 6 July 1999) is a Congolese professional footballer who plays as a centre back for the Belgian club Crossing Schaerbeek.

== Professional career ==
Kakudji was born in Belgium, and is of Congolese descent. He played football with Seraing and Gent alongside boxing and rugby as an adolescent, and moved to Antwerp in 2018. Kakudji made his professional debut with Antwerp in a 3–0 Belgian First Division A win over Cercle Brugge on 9 December 2018.

== International career ==
Kakudji was called up to the DR Congo U23s for 2019 Africa U-23 Cup of Nations qualification matches in March 2019.
