= 1952–53 Belgian First Division =

50th season of top-tier football in Belgium

Belgian First Division
- Season: 1952–53

Statistics of Belgian First Division in the 1952–53 season.

== Overview ==
Location of teams in Belgian First Division 1952–53

It was contested by 16 teams, and R.F.C. de Liège won the championship.

== League standings ==
Pos	Team	Pld	W	D	L	GF	GA	GD	Pts	Relegation
1	R.F.C. de Liège	30	18	6	6	65	36	+29	42	
2	R.S.C. Anderlecht	30	19	3	8	77	43	+34	41	
3	Beerschot	30	16	4	10	80	48	+32	36	
4	K.R.C. Mechelen	30	14	6	10	52	47	+5	34	
5	Standard Liège	30	12	9	9	59	53	+6	33	
6	KV Mechelen	30	13	7	10	57	57	0	33	
7	R.O.C. de Charleroi-Marchienne	30	11	8	11	40	45	−5	30	
8	Royale Union Saint-Gilloise	30	12	6	12	47	48	−1	30	
9	La Gantoise	30	12	5	13	52	55	−3	29	
10	Tilleur FC	30	9	10	11	37	44	−7	28	
11	K Berchem Sport	30	11	6	13	51	53	−2	28	
12	Royal Antwerp FC	30	10	7	13	47	57	−10	27	
13	Daring Club	30	8	9	13	40	43	−3	25	
14	R. Charleroi S.C.	30	10	4	16	48	78	−30	24	
15	RC de Gand	30	10	1	19	34	52	−18	21	Relegated to Division II
16	Beringen FC	30	5	9	16	39	66	−27	19	Relegated to Division II

== Results ==
Home \ Away	AND	ANT	BEE	BRC	BER	CHA	DAR	GNT	GAN	FCL	KVM	RCM	OLY	STA	USG	TIL
Anderlecht		3–2	2–1	6–2	6–0	1–1	2–0	6–1	1–0	4–0	3–2	0–2	1–1	6–1	0–2	4–1
Antwerp	1–0		3–2	0–1	1–1	5–2	2–1	1–3	1–0	2–1	0–2	1–0	0–3	0–0	2–2	2–2
Beerschot	2–3	4–2		1–1	5–1	6–1	3–2	5–2	2–1	2–0	2–3	1–2	0–2	5–3	3–0	2–1
Berchem	3–5	4–3	1–4		1–1	3–1	0–4	1–1	4–0	2–2	1–0	0–1	4–0	2–2	0–2	0–1
Beringen	0–1	1–2	0–4	2–2		3–1	1–2	2–4	3–2	1–2	2–2	0–1	0–0	2–3	2–2	1–1
Charleroi	1–4	3–0	2–2	4–3	2–1		1–0	3–1	3–0	2–3	1–3	5–1	0–2	2–0	1–0	0–0
Daring Club	2–4	1–1	1–1	0–2	2–0	2–2		1–3	0–0	1–2	1–2	0–2	5–0	1–1	1–0	0–0
La Gantoise	1–3	2–0	2–1	1–2	1–5	7–0	0–3		1–0	0–0	3–1	3–0	1–1	3–1	2–3	1–0
RC de Gand	1–0	1–4	2–4	1–0	2–3	3–1	1–4	3–0		2–3	3–2	3–1	2–1	1–2	1–0	0–1
Liège	3–1	4–0	3–2	1–0	5–1	6–1	4–0	4–2	2–0		4–0	2–0	5–1	1–1	0–3	3–2
KV Mechelen	3–2	2–1	1–5	1–6	1–2	3–2	1–1	1–1	2–0	1–0		5–3	2–2	1–0	4–1	5–1
K.R.C. Mechelen	3–1	1–2	2–2	3–1	2–0	3–2	1–1	3–1	2–0	0–0	2–2		6–0	5–4	1–1	0–1
Olympic Charleroi	1–2	3–1	2–1	2–0	2–2	0–1	2–0	2–0	1–2	1–2	2–2	1–1		2–0	4–1	0–0
Standard Liège	5–1	2–2	0–4	3–0	4–1	5–0	3–1	1–1	2–0	2–1	1–1	3–1	1–2		2–1	3–3
Union SG	0–4	4–3	2–1	0–2	1–1	6–1	2–2	0–4	0–2	1–1	3–1	4–1	1–0	1–2		2–0
Tilleur	1–1	2–2	1–3	1–3	2–0	4–2	0–1	2–0	2–1	1–1	2–1	1–2	2–0	2–2	0–2	

Legend: Blue = home team win; Yellow = draw; Red = away team win.
