= 1956–57 Belgian First Division =

54th season of top-tier football in Belgium

Belgian First Division
- Season: 1956–57

Statistics of Belgian First Division in the 1956–57 season.

== Overview ==
Location of teams in Belgian First Division 1956–57

It was contested by 16 teams, and Royal Antwerp FC won the championship.

== League standings ==
Pos	Team	Pld	W	D	L	GF	GA	GD	Pts	Qualification or relegation
1	Royal Antwerp FC	30	19	8	3	69	28	+41	46	Qualified for 1957–58 European Cup
2	R.S.C. Anderlecht	30	16	8	6	82	47	+35	40	
3	La Gantoise	30	16	7	7	73	37	+36	39	
4	Daring Club	30	15	5	10	67	56	+11	35	
5	R.F.C. de Liège	30	14	6	10	52	44	+8	34	
6	Lierse S.K.	30	14	6	10	54	51	+3	34	
7	Standard Liège	30	11	11	8	54	47	+7	33	
8	R.C.S. Verviétois	30	10	12	8	47	39	+8	32	
9	Royale Union Saint-Gilloise	30	11	8	11	53	55	−2	30	
10	K Berchem Sport	30	8	12	10	37	49	−12	28	
11	R.O.C. de Charleroi-Marchienne	30	8	9	13	43	55	−12	25	
12	Beerschot	30	10	4	16	49	75	−26	24	
13	Tilleur FC	30	9	5	16	47	69	−22	23	
14	K.R.C. Mechelen	30	7	8	15	45	63	−18	22	
15	Beringen FC	30	6	6	18	36	65	−29	18	Relegated to Division II
16	R. Charleroi S.C.	30	6	5	19	34	62	−28	17	Relegated to Division II

== Results ==
Home \ Away	AND	ANT	BEE	BRC	BER	CHA	DAR	GNT	FCL	LIE	MEC	OLY	STA	USG	TIL	VER
Anderlecht		5–1	12–3	1–1	6–4	2–2	4–1	2–1	2–1	1–1	6–1	1–1	6–2	1–1	10–1	3–2
Antwerp	2–2		3–2	5–0	3–0	3–0	4–0	2–0	0–0	2–3	3–0	6–1	1–1	1–0	1–0	3–1
Beerschot	1–0	0–3		2–2	3–1	0–1	4–2	2–5	4–0	1–4	1–1	2–0	0–2	3–0	0–2	2–0
Berchem	0–0	1–1	0–3		2–1	0–4	1–1	2–1	2–2	1–2	0–0	2–0	1–1	1–1	1–0	2–1
Beringen	0–1	1–3	1–1	5–0		1–0	0–2	2–0	0–2	0–2	4–1	3–0	0–6	2–2	1–0	2–2
Charleroi	1–3	1–3	2–4	0–1	3–0		3–1	0–4	2–2	1–2	0–3	2–0	1–3	0–0	1–2	1–1
Daring Club	1–5	2–2	3–0	4–2	5–0	1–1		0–2	2–1	2–0	6–3	4–2	4–0	1–2	2–0	0–1
La Gantoise	1–0	1–1	1–1	1–0	2–1	6–1	7–4		4–0	6–1	4–0	3–1	0–0	2–0	7–0	3–3
Liège	3–0	0–3	2–1	1–0	3–1	1–0	1–2	0–1		4–0	2–1	5–1	1–1	2–2	3–2	3–0
Lierse	3–0	1–3	2–4	1–1	4–2	4–1	1–2	2–1	4–0		1–1	1–0	1–0	3–2	3–1	0–2
Mechelen	0–3	1–2	5–0	1–4	0–0	2–1	4–0	1–2	0–2	2–2		1–3	1–1	1–4	4–1	1–2
Olympic Charleroi	3–3	1–1	5–1	1–1	5–1	3–1	1–1	2–2	1–3	2–2	0–1		3–0	0–2	0–0	2–1
Standard Liège	0–1	1–0	2–1	7–2	0–0	3–1	1–1	3–1	3–3	3–1	2–6	2–2		5–2	1–2	0–0
Union SG	0–1	1–1	7–1	2–0	3–1	0–2	2–5	3–2	2–1	2–1	6–2	0–1	1–3		3–2	2–2
Tilleur	4–0	1–3	3–1	0–7	0–0	4–1	2–7	2–2	1–3	4–2	0–0	1–2	3–0	7–0		0–2
Verviers	5–1	1–3	4–1	0–0	4–2	3–0	0–1	1–1	2–1	0–0	1–1	2–0	1–1	1–1	2–2	

Legend: Blue = home team win; Yellow = draw; Red = away team win.
