= 1943–44 Belgian First Division =

42nd season of top-tier football in Belgium

Belgian First Division
- Season: 1943–44

Statistics of Belgian First Division in the 1943–44 season.

== Overview ==
Location of teams in Belgian First Division 1943–44

It was contested by 16 teams, and Royal Antwerp FC won the championship.

== League standings ==
Pos	Team	Pld	W	D	L	GF	GA	GD	Pts	Relegation
1	Royal Antwerp FC	30	23	3	4	83	22	+61	49	
2	R.S.C. Anderlecht	30	19	4	7	84	52	+32	42	
3	Beerschot	30	14	9	7	73	49	+24	37	
4	Lierse S.K.	30	14	8	8	63	55	+8	36	
5	KV Mechelen	30	13	8	9	60	48	+12	34	
6	K Berchem Sport	30	11	9	10	63	84	−21	31	
7	Royale Union Saint-Gilloise	30	12	6	12	60	58	+2	30	
8	Cercle Brugge K.S.V.	30	12	5	13	51	47	+4	29	
9	R.O.C. de Charleroi-Marchienne	30	10	8	12	64	58	+6	28	
10	CS La Forestoise	30	11	6	13	63	88	−25	28	
11	White Star	29	11	4	14	67	70	−3	26	
12	Eendracht Alost	30	11	4	15	45	58	−13	26	
13	K.A.A. Gent	30	6	11	13	54	70	−16	23	
14	Standard Liège	29	9	4	16	57	87	−30	22	
15	K. Lyra	30	5	9	16	55	79	−24	19	Relegated to 1945-46 Division I
16	Tilleur	30	5	8	17	36	71	−35	18	Relegated to 1945-46 Division I

== Results ==
Home \ Away	AAL	AND	ANT	BEE	BRC	CER	FOR	GNT	LIE	LYR	MEC	OLY	STA	USG	TIL	WST
Eendracht Alost		1–3	1–3	0–3	3–0	4–1	2–0	2–1	0–1	2–2	0–2	3–2	2–1	2–2	2–0	3–3
Anderlecht	1–0		3–2	6–3	8–3	2–1	7–0	3–1	3–0	7–2	7–2	2–1	1–2	3–0	1–1	5–3
Antwerp	5–0	3–0		3–2	0–0	2–0	5–0	1–1	4–0	4–1	3–0	3–0	6–0	6–1	2–1	3–0
Beerschot AC	4–0	2–2	1–2		1–1	1–0	2–3	3–1	0–0	7–1	2–2	3–0	5–0	2–1	2–1	6–3
Berchem	5–2	2–4	0–1	2–2		3–0	3–4	2–2	1–1	2–0	2–2	2–2	3–1	3–2	3–2	1–1
Cercle Brugge	1–0	0–1	0–2	1–1	2–1		1–2	3–1	4–4	2–2	0–1	1–1	2–5	2–1	1–0	3–0
La Forestoise	4–3	2–0	0–3	1–7	3–4	1–3		2–2	3–2	2–2	3–0	6–3	3–3	1–1	3–2	5–3
La Gantoise	2–0	0–2	4–2	2–2	2–1	1–3	3–1		2–2	1–1	1–1	3–2	1–4	3–3	2–1	1–5
Lierse	2–1	4–2	1–3	2–2	3–2	1–7	2–1	3–2		3–2	2–1	2–2	7–0	2–1	3–0	5–1
Lyra	2–3	4–6	0–2	2–3	0–1	0–2	6–1	4–2	1–1		1–4	2–1	1–1	1–2	0–0	6–2
KV Mechelen	0–1	3–1	1–1	1–2	4–2	1–0	3–1	2–2	2–2	4–1		3–3	5–0	0–1	6–0	3–1
Olympic Charleroi	4–2	5–0	2–4	3–0	1–3	2–2	5–0	3–3	2–1	1–1	1–0		0–1	5–1	6–0	1–1
Standard Liège	2–4	1–1	1–0	4–1	3–4	2–7	5–3	4–4	2–4	4–1	1–2	0–1		2–4	0–1	3–10
Union SG	1–2	2–0	1–0	2–0	6–2	1–0	4–4	3–1	0–1	4–0	1–1	5–1	2–3		5–3	2–5
Tilleur	0–0	1–1	0–6	2–2	1–1	1–2	1–3	2–1	2–1	5–5	1–2	1–4	3–2	1–1		1–0
White Star	1–0	1–2	1–2	1–2	1–4	3–1	1–1	3–2	2–1	0–4	5–2	3–0	– (Note: The match between White Star and Standard Liège was not played.)	2–0	5–1	

Legend: Blue = home team win; Yellow = draw; Red = away team win.
