= 1950–51 Belgian First Division =

48th season of top-tier football in Belgium

Belgian First Division
- Season: 1950–51

Statistics of Belgian First Division in the 1950–51 season.

== Overview ==
Location of teams in Belgian First Division 1950–51

It was contested by 16 teams, and R.S.C. Anderlecht won the championship.

== League standings ==
Pos	Team	Pld	W	D	L	GF	GA	GD	Pts	Relegation
1	R.S.C. Anderlecht	30	13	12	5	66	38	+28	38	
2	K Berchem Sport	30	17	4	9	71	48	+23	38	
3	K.R.C. Mechelen	30	13	10	7	55	43	+12	36	
4	R.F.C. de Liège	30	13	9	8	65	41	+24	35	
5	Beerschot	30	13	8	9	67	44	+23	34	
6	Royal Antwerp FC	30	13	8	9	54	52	+2	34	
7	K.A.A. Gent	30	11	10	9	43	38	+5	32	
8	Standard Liège	30	11	8	11	44	47	−3	30	
9	R.O.C. de Charleroi-Marchienne	30	12	5	13	60	60	0	29	
10	KV Mechelen	30	12	5	13	58	69	−11	29	
11	R. Charleroi S.C.	30	9	9	12	42	47	−5	27	
12	R.R.C. Bruxelles	30	9	8	13	43	49	−6	26	
13	Tilleur FC	30	9	8	13	41	48	−7	26	
14	Daring Club	30	7	9	14	46	66	−20	23	
15	Beringen FC	30	9	4	17	43	78	−35	22	Relegated to Division I
16	Club Brugge K.V.	30	6	9	15	27	57	−30	21	Relegated to Division I

== Results ==
Home \ Away	AND	ANT	BEE	BRC	BER	CLU	RCB	CHA	DAR	GNT	FCL	KVM	OLY	RCM	STA	TIL
Anderlecht		3–0	3–1	3–2	6–0	3–0	2–0	3–3	5–0	2–3	1–3	7–1	2–0	1–1	2–2	1–2
Antwerp	4–2		0–2	1–1	6–0	1–0	2–2	1–0	4–2	3–1	4–3	0–0	2–2	0–4	2–0	1–2
Beerschot	2–2	4–1		3–0	3–0	1–1	1–1	3–1	5–0	2–2	3–0	1–2	2–2	1–3	3–1	5–1
Berchem	1–3	2–0	3–2		3–0	4–1	2–1	3–1	1–4	6–1	1–1	4–2	7–2	1–0	4–2	1–0
Beringen	1–1	0–0	3–3	0–4		1–2	1–0	4–1	3–1	1–2	2–2	1–3	4–2	3–1	2–1	1–0
Club Brugge	1–1	1–4	0–0	3–2	0–3		1–1	1–1	2–1	1–2	1–1	2–1	2–1	1–2	1–1	1–1
Racing Bruxelles	1–3	1–5	0–3	0–1	5–1	3–1		2–0	1–1	1–2	2–0	1–0	2–0	1–1	1–1	1–4
Charleroi	0–0	3–0	1–5	0–2	2–1	1–0	1–0		1–2	1–1	0–0	1–2	1–1	3–0	2–1	1–0
Daring Club	2–2	1–2	2–2	2–2	2–1	4–1	3–1	2–2		1–1	1–4	3–2	1–3	1–3	3–1	0–0
La Gantoise	0–0	1–3	0–2	1–1	3–0	0–1	0–1	1–2	4–2		1–1	3–2	5–0	1–1	0–0	3–0
Liège	1–1	1–2	3–1	3–1	8–3	1–0	2–2	3–2	5–1	1–1		3–0	4–1	5–0	3–0	2–2
KV Mechelen	0–3	2–2	4–2	3–7	2–1	3–1	3–2	1–2	3–1	1–3	2–1		4–1	2–2	4–3	4–2
Olympic Charleroi	2–3	2–2	4–1	1–0	8–0	5–0	2–4	1–0	2–1	1–0	1–0	3–3		1–2	6–1	1–0
K.R.C. Mechelen	4–0	1–1	1–0	3–1	3–2	5–0	2–2	2–2	1–1	0–1	2–1	2–2	2–1		2–2	4–2
Standard Liège	0–0	4–0	1–0	3–4	1–3	2–0	1–0	2–2	1–0	1–0	2–0	2–0	4–2	2–0		1–1
Tilleur	1–1	2–1	2–4	2–0	2–1	1–1	3–4	3–2	1–1	0–0	1–2	3–0	1–2	2–1	0–1	

Legend: Blue = home team win; Yellow = draw; Red = away team win.
