= 1954–55 Belgian First Division =

52nd season of top-tier football in Belgium

Belgian First Division
- Season: 1954–55

Statistics of Belgian First Division in the 1954–55 season.

== Overview ==
Location of teams in Belgian First Division 1954–55

It was contested by 16 teams, and R.S.C. Anderlecht won the championship.

== League standings ==
Pos	Team	Pld	W	D	L	GF	GA	GD	Pts	Qualification or relegation
1	R.S.C. Anderlecht (C)	30	19	3	8	75	47	+28	41	Qualification for the European Cup first round
2	La Gantoise	30	16	6	8	55	33	+22	38	
3	Standard Liège	30	16	5	9	75	46	+29	37	
4	Royale Union Saint-Gilloise	30	14	5	11	61	51	+10	33	
5	K Berchem Sport	30	10	11	9	49	40	+9	31	
6	R.F.C. de Liège	30	12	7	11	50	50	0	31	
7	K. Waterschei S.V. Thor Genk	30	13	5	12	57	74	−17	31	
8	R. Charleroi S.C.	30	12	6	12	53	57	−4	30	
9	KV Mechelen	30	13	4	13	57	52	+5	30	
10	Royal Antwerp FC	30	13	4	13	50	47	+3	30	
11	Beerschot	30	12	4	14	75	64	+11	28	
12	Lierse S.K.	30	12	4	14	46	47	−1	28	
13	K.R.C. Mechelen	30	12	4	14	56	60	−4	28	
14	Tilleur FC	30	9	9	12	61	67	−6	27	
15	R.R.C. Bruxelles (R)	30	8	4	18	42	74	−32	20	Relegated to Division II
16	R.O.C. de Charleroi-Marchienne (R)	30	6	5	19	37	90	−53	17	Relegated to Division II

(C) Champions; (R) Relegated

== Results ==
Home \ Away	AND	ANT	BEE	BRC	CHA	RCB	GNT	FCL	LIE	KVM	RCM	OLY	STA	USG	TIL	WAT
Anderlecht		5–2	2–1	1–1	0–1	10–3	1–0	2–1	3–1	2–1	3–1	4–1	3–0	2–0	2–3	5–2
Antwerp	4–2		1–1	3–0	4–1	1–2	2–2	1–0	2–0	3–1	0–0	– (Note: Punished following the "Leghait Affair", Olympic Charleroi lost 8 games by default (5–0 or 0–5). Of these eight matches, the "Dogues" had taken 5 points (1 win / 3 draws / 4 losses). Here are the results recorded before the application of the sanction: La Gantoise - Olympic : 2–2, Olympic - Beerschot : 3–3, Berchem Sport - Olympic : 1–0, Olympic - KV Mechelen : 1–2, Antwerp FC - Olympic : 2–3, Olympic - Racing Bruxelles : 1–1, Olympic - Sporting Charleroi : 2–5 and KRC Mechelen - Olympic : 4–2.)	2–1	1–3	2–0	5–2
Beerschot	4–2	0–1		1–6	9–1	1–2	2–2	5–1	2–1	3–4	0–4	5–0	0–5	2–1	9–1	5–0
Berchem	2–1	3–1	2–1		1–1	5–1	1–2	1–1	2–2	0–3	4–0	–	2–2	3–2	2–2	0–1
Charleroi	2–1	3–2	3–0	0–1		1–1	1–3	6–4	1–1	4–0	2–0	1–0	1–1	1–2	3–1	3–1
Racing Bruxelles	0–2	0–1	1–1	1–1	3–1		1–2	1–2	1–4	3–2	3–0	3–2	0–2	1–2	1–4	1–0
La Gantoise	0–1	0–0	2–1	2–0	4–1	7–1		1–4	2–1	1–0	4–1	–	2–1	2–1	2–2	3–0
Liège	0–1	1–1	3–0	1–1	1–0	2–2	0–1		3–0	3–1	0–1	2–1	3–0	1–1	3–1	2–2
Lierse	0–1	1–0	2–3	2–2	4–0	2–1	2–1	0–2		2–1	2–1	3–3	3–0	0–1	0–1	2–3
KV Mechelen	5–3	1–0	4–2	2–0	0–3	2–1	1–1	6–0	1–2		1–1	0–0	1–1	2–0	4–2	4–0
K.R.C. Mechelen	2–3	3–1	1–1	3–1	3–2	2–0	1–0	1–3	2–0	1–2		–	2–1	2–3	4–3	9–2
Olympic Charleroi	3–4	4–1	–	0–0	–	–	1–1	1–0	3–1	–	2–0		4–9	0–1	2–1	4–2
Standard Liège	2–0	3–0	2–3	1–0	6–2	4–1	3–1	2–2	2–1	2–1	8–1	4–2		4–2	3–2	5–2
Union SG	2–6	3–1	1–5	0–1	0–0	3–1	3–1	6–0	1–2	5–1	2–1	3–1	1–1		4–0	3–3
Tilleur	2–2	3–1	7–2	1–1	1–1	6–1	0–2	2–4	0–2	4–0	3–3	2–2	1–0	2–2		2–1
Waterschei Thor	1–1	3–2	2–2	2–1	3–2	2–0	1–0	2–1	2–3	3–1	4–1	3–1	2–1	4–3	2–2	

Legend: Blue = home team win; Yellow = draw; Red = away team win.
