= 1955–56 Belgian First Division =

53rd season of top-tier football in Belgium

Belgian First Division
- Season: 1955–56

The 1955–56 season of the Belgian First Division was won by R.S.C. Anderlecht.

== Overview ==
Location of teams in Belgian First Division 1955–56

It was contested by 16 teams, and R.S.C. Anderlecht won the championship.

== League standings ==
Pos	Team	Pld	W	D	L	GF	GA	GD	Pts	Qualification or relegation
1	R.S.C. Anderlecht (C)	30	18	6	6	83	36	+47	42	Qualification for the European Cup preliminary round
2	Royal Antwerp FC	30	14	11	5	55	38	+17	39	
3	Royale Union Saint-Gilloise	30	12	13	5	59	46	+13	37	
4	K Berchem Sport	30	12	9	9	53	52	+1	33	
5	K.R.C. Mechelen	30	13	7	10	55	56	−1	33	
6	R.F.C. de Liège	30	12	7	11	59	53	+6	31	
7	R. Charleroi S.C.	30	12	7	11	52	52	0	31	
8	Standard Liège	30	11	8	11	68	48	+20	30	
9	Daring Club	30	12	5	13	49	51	−2	29	
10	Beerschot	30	12	5	13	51	59	−8	29	
11	Lierse S.K.	30	12	4	14	41	53	−12	28	
12	La Gantoise	30	7	12	11	47	42	+5	26	
13	Beringen FC	30	8	9	13	39	52	−13	25	
14	Tilleur FC	30	9	7	14	43	60	−17	25	
15	K. Waterschei S.V. Thor Genk	30	8	6	16	42	63	−21	22	Relegated to Division II
16	KV Mechelen	30	6	8	16	45	80	−35	20	Relegated to Division II

(C) Champions

== Results ==
Home \ Away	AND	ANT	BEE	BRC	BER	CHA	DAR	GNT	FCL	LIE	KVM	RCM	STA	USG	TIL	WTG
Anderlecht		2–2	6–0	4–1	2–0	2–3	4–0	4–0	4–3	4–1	2–1	5–1	1–0	2–2	8–2	4–1
Antwerp	1–0		1–3	1–1	3–0	2–1	4–2	2–2	2–2	2–3	4–0	4–1	2–0	4–4	2–1	0–0
Beerschot	1–0	1–2		5–1	2–0	1–0	0–3	0–1	3–3	1–1	8–3	1–3	2–1	2–0	5–1	2–1
Berchem	1–1	1–1	3–2		2–3	3–1	5–1	1–0	4–1	2–0	2–3	2–0	0–3	0–0	0–2	4–1
Beringen	2–2	2–2	1–0	0–0		6–0	0–0	0–0	1–1	2–0	2–2	2–0	1–5	0–5	1–2	2–5
Charleroi	2–3	1–2	1–1	1–1	1–0		4–2	2–1	1–0	1–2	7–1	4–2	2–1	1–3	1–0	1–3
Daring Club	1–4	0–2	2–0	0–2	1–2	0–3		2–2	2–1	0–2	1–2	1–2	2–1	1–1	1–0	3–0
La Gantoise	1–1	1–2	0–1	4–0	2–3	1–1	1–1		1–2	2–0	1–1	1–2	3–3	4–2	0–0	9–2
Liège	3–0	3–0	4–0	2–5	1–1	1–2	2–3	1–0		3–0	1–1	3–0	3–1	1–1	4–2	1–2
Lierse	0–2	1–0	3–3	1–1	1–0	3–2	2–3	1–2	2–1		2–1	2–3	1–0	3–3	1–3	2–1
KV Mechelen	1–7	1–1	6–1	2–3	2–1	0–1	0–3	1–3	2–3	1–5		3–2	1–1	2–3	0–0	3–1
K.R.C. Mechelen	4–2	0–0	0–0	2–1	2–1	3–3	0–2	2–2	2–3	2–0	5–1		3–3	1–1	3–1	5–1
Standard Liège	1–0	2–2	3–2	2–2	1–2	1–1	3–8	2–2	7–1	2–0	4–1	6–0		1–1	6–0	2–1
Union SG	1–1	2–1	6–1	1–1	4–2	2–2	1–0	0–0	3–2	0–2	3–0	1–2	3–1		2–1	3–2
Tilleur	0–1	0–2	3–2	3–4	3–1	2–2	0–3	2–1	0–0	4–1	1–1	1–1	0–5	5–0		3–1
Waterschei Thor	0–5	1–2	0–1	5–0	1–1	3–0	1–1	1–0	1–3	2–0	2–2	0–2	1–0	1–1	1–1	

Legend: Blue = home team win; Yellow = draw; Red = away team win.
