= Tubantia Borgerhout =

Belgian football club

- Full name: Koninklijke Tubantia Borgerhout Voetbal Klub
- Nickname: Den Tuub
- Short name: K Tubantia Borgerhout VK
- Founded: 10 April 1915
- Stadium: Peter Benoitlaan
- Coach: (Belgium) Germain Pouwels
- League: 3e Provincial B – Antwerp
- 2025-2026: 13º
- Website: www.tubantiaborgerhout64.com
Home colours	Away colours

K. Tubantia Borgerhout V.K. is a Belgian association football club from the town of Borgerhout in the municipality of Antwerp. It was given the matricule n°64 by the Belgian Football Association and it now plays in the highest regional league of the Antwerp province. The club is known to have sold the skillful attacker Joseph Mermans to R.S.C. Anderlecht during World War II for a record fee of 125,000 Belgian francs.

== History ==
Tubantia Football & Athletic Club was founded in 1915 and first accessed to the second division in 1928 finishing 8th. The next year it finished 2nd and thus played the first division in 1930–31 finishing 11th on 14 (this year R.S.C. Anderlecht finished last). However Tubantia finished 13th one season later and was relegated with F.C. Turnhout. The club then enjoyed a spell in the second division. In 1940 Tubantia F.A.C. changed its name to K. Tubantia F.C.

In 1954 it was relegated to the third division and it would never come back at this level, as of 2006. The club however merged with K.R.C. Borgerhout in 1960 to become K. Tubantia Borgerhout F.C. Eleven years later it changed the F.C. to its Dutch counterpart V.K. (for Voetbal Klub).

== Honours ==
- Belgian Second Division
  - Runners-up (1): 1929–30
- Belgian Cup:
  - Runners-up (1): 1926–27
