= 1940–41 in Belgian football =

Football in Belgium
- Season: 1940–41

The national football competitions in Belgium were not held during the 1940–41 season because of World War II. However, an unofficial Belgian championship took place among 20 teams, which was not recognised by the Royal Belgian Football Association. Liersche SK won that championship. The Belgium national football team did not play any official match during the season.

== Overview ==
The unofficial Belgian championship was organised in two leagues of 10 clubs each. After the first round, when each team had played every other team in their league once, the top 4 teams of each league qualified for the quarter-finals in two legs. From then on, the championship has been played as a knockout tournament. The final game took place on a neutral ground and opposed Liersche SK to R White Star AC. Liersche SK won the game 3–1.
