= François De Wael =

Belgian footballer

Personal information
- Date of birth: 10 November 1922
- Date of death: 15 December 2006 (aged 84)

International career
Years	Team	Apps	(Gls)
1944	Belgium	1	(1)

François De Wael (10 November 1922 – 15 December 2006) was a Belgian footballer. He played in one match for the Belgium national football team in 1944.
