= 1941–42 Belgian First Division =

Belgian First Division
- Season: 1941–42

Statistics of Belgian First Division in the 1941–42 season.

== Overview ==
Location of teams in Belgian First Division 1941–42

It was contested by 14 teams, and Lierse S.K. won the championship.
No clubs were relegated owing to the expansion of the Premier Division the following season from 14 clubs to 16.

== League standings ==
Pos	Team	Pld	W	D	L	GF	GA	GD	Pts
1	Lierse S.K.	26	18	3	5	92	41	+51	39
2	Beerschot	26	17	1	8	78	38	+40	35
3	Royal Antwerp FC	26	13	7	6	63	36	+27	33
4	R.O.C. de Charleroi-Marchienne	26	15	3	8	60	47	+13	33
5	Eendracht Alost	26	13	4	9	57	55	+2	30
6	R.S.C. Anderlecht	26	11	5	10	44	44	0	27
7	Tilleur	26	12	3	11	59	55	+4	27
8	K.A.A. Gent	26	12	3	11	46	39	+7	27
9	Royale Union Saint-Gilloise	26	9	5	12	61	66	−5	23
10	KV Mechelen	26	10	3	13	61	67	−6	23
11	White Star	26	10	3	13	52	67	−15	23
12	Standard Liège	26	9	4	13	54	63	−9	22
13	Cercle Brugge K.S.V.	26	4	5	17	24	49	−25	13
14	K Boom FC	26	2	5	19	38	122	−84	9

== Results ==
Home \ Away	AAL	AND	GNT	ANT	BEE	BOO	CER	LIE	MEC	OLY	STA	TIL	USG	WST
Eendracht Alost		0–0	0–0	3–2	3–2	7–3	2–0	7–1	6–1	2–3	3–1	1–2	3–1	3–2
Anderlecht	2–1		0–5	1–1	1–2	2–3	2–1	6–2	4–0	1–2	3–1	3–1	2–1	1–2
ARA La Gantoise	1–2	0–2		1–2	1–0	2–0	5–0	0–2	2–0	1–3	2–1	3–2	4–0	2–1
Antwerp	4–1	1–1	5–1		0–3	5–0	2–0	1–1	5–1	2–0	2–1	1–3	3–3	6–1
Beerschot	3–0	0–1	1–2	1–1		10–1	2–0	3–1	2–5	2–1	4–1	5–0	3–1	3–1
Boom	0–0	2–2	2–6	0–4	1–3		4–4	3–4	1–4	2–7	2–6	0–4	0–5	3–3
Cercle Brugge	1–1	3–3	1–0	1–0	0–1	0–2		0–1	0–1	2–2	0–1	1–3	1–0	1–1
Lierse	6–1	5–1	3–1	2–2	3–2	12–0	4–1		3–0	3–0	2–2	4–2	4–0	1–2
KV Mechelen	1–2	4–0	3–1	2–2	3–8	3–2	2–3	2–0		4–4	4–0	1–1	5–3	5–0
Olympic Charleroi	6–2	2–0	1–1	2–1	5–1	4–2	1–0	1–4	3–1		2–1	1–0	3–5	1–2
Standard Liège	6–2	1–2	3–1	3–4	2–7	3–1	2–1	0–3	5–3	1–2		3–2	3–3	2–1
Tilleur	1–2	2–1	1–2	0–3	1–6	14–2	2–1	0–6	2–1	2–0	1–1		5–1	4–3
Union SG	4–0	2–1	1–1	4–1	1–4	7–1	1–0	4–5	2–1	2–3	3–3	2–2		2–1
White Star	2–3	0–2	3–1	0–3	2–0	1–1	4–2	0–10	6–4	3–1	3–1	1–2	7–3	

Legend: Blue = home team win; Yellow = draw; Red = away team win.
