= Michel Van Vaerenbergh =

Belgian footballer

Personal information
- Date of birth: 21 February 1920
- Date of death: 11 March 1986 (aged 66)

International career
Years	Team	Apps	(Gls)
1946–1949	Belgium	2	(1)

Michel Van Vaerenbergh (21 February 1920 – 11 March 1986) was a Belgian footballer. He played in two matches for the Belgium national football team from 1946 to 1949.
