= Léon Gillaux =

Belgian footballer

Personal information
- Date of birth: 23 December 1919
- Place of birth: Walcourt, Belgium
- Date of death: 5 January 2006 (aged 86)

International career
Years	Team	Apps	(Gls)
1945	Belgium	2	(1)

Léon Gillaux (23 December 1919 – 5 January 2006) was a Belgian footballer. He played in two matches for the Belgium national football team in 1945.
