= 1945–46 Belgian First Division =

43rd season of top-tier football in Belgium

Belgian First Division
- Season: 1945–46

The 1945–46 Belgian First Division was contested by 19 teams, and KV Mechelen won the championship.

== Overview ==
Location of teams in Belgian First Division 1945–46

== League standings ==
Pos	Team	Pld	W	D	L	GF	GA	GD	Pts	Relegation
1	KV Mechelen	36	25	5	6	108	41	+67	55	
2	Royal Antwerp FC	36	21	7	8	96	44	+52	49	
3	R.S.C. Anderlecht	36	20	6	10	94	69	+25	46	
4	R.R.C. Bruxelles	36	17	8	11	71	53	+18	42	
5	White Star	36	16	7	13	76	73	+3	39	
6	R.F.C. de Liège	36	14	10	12	81	66	+15	38	
7	K Berchem Sport	36	15	8	13	87	81	+6	38	
8	Royale Union Saint-Gilloise	36	15	7	14	69	71	−2	37	
9	Eendracht Alost	36	12	12	12	65	80	−15	36	
10	K.A.A. Gent	36	16	4	16	67	66	+1	36	
11	K Boom FC	36	12	10	14	64	71	−7	34	
12	CS La Forestoise	36	13	6	17	66	70	−4	32	
13	Sint-Niklase	36	13	6	17	47	67	−20	32	
14	Standard Liège	36	14	4	18	77	94	−17	32	
15	Lierse S.K.	36	12	7	17	75	97	−22	31	
16	Beerschot	36	12	7	17	56	80	−24	31	
17	R.O.C. de Charleroi-Marchienne	36	11	8	17	52	73	−21	30	
18	Tilleur	36	10	8	18	35	53	−18	28	Relegated to Division I
19	Cercle Brugge K.S.V.	36	7	4	25	55	92	−37	18	Relegated to Division I

== Results ==
Home \ Away	AAL	AND	ANT	BEE	BRC	BOO	CER	RCB	FOR	GNT	FCL	LIE	MEC	OLY	STA	USG	SNI	TIL	WST
Eendracht Alost		0–3	0–0	3–7	0–3	1–5	2–1	0–3	2–2	3–1	2–1	2–1	3–3	2–2	2–4	4–1	4–1	2–0	3–1
Anderlecht	1–3		4–1	1–1	6–5	9–2	4–0	0–1	1–0	3–2	2–2	3–2	1–4	2–3	6–2	2–4	1–0	1–1	3–2
Antwerp	2–2	1–2		0–1	9–3	2–1	3–0	3–2	4–0	4–0	3–1	8–1	2–2	3–0	2–1	5–2	5–1	1–0	1–1
Beerschot	1–4	3–3	1–4		0–2	2–0	3–0	0–5	2–3	4–1	2–0	0–0	1–9	3–2	0–2	2–2	1–1	1–0	3–2
Berchem	4–4	5–4	0–1	1–2		3–3	1–1	6–3	1–1	0–4	4–1	4–1	0–2	1–1	2–2	6–2	0–1	3–2	2–5
Boom	0–0	1–3	2–2	3–1	0–1		4–2	2–1	1–4	1–1	3–0	0–1	0–3	3–0	1–4	3–3	2–0	1–2	4–0
Cercle Brugge	4–0	1–2	1–3	1–0	2–3	4–2		0–2	3–3	0–1	3–4	5–1	1–1	3–1	4–2	1–4	1–2	5–0	1–2
Racing Bruxelles	4–1	1–1	1–0	2–0	1–0	1–1	3–0		1–1	1–1	1–1	2–2	1–5	5–1	5–3	2–2	4–3	3–1	3–3
La Forestoise	4–0	1–2	0–2	0–2	2–6	1–1	6–2	2–0		4–1	2–3	0–3	1–3	0–1	3–1	2–1	3–1	0–0	2–1
La Gantoise	1–2	4–1	0–5	2–1	3–1	4–2	3–1	1–0	3–0		3–2	0–2	2–1	1–2	10–1	3–2	1–1	1–0	2–1
Liège	1–1	4–4	1–2	3–1	2–2	1–1	3–1	3–0	5–1	4–4		2–2	1–2	3–1	4–1	3–0	9–0	1–0	2–1
Lierse	4–2	1–4	1–3	6–4	2–2	4–4	2–0	3–4	1–2	1–2	2–2		4–0	1–2	8–3	2–3	2–1	4–1	2–1
KV Mechelen	4–0	4–1	3–1	5–0	2–4	5–1	1–1	2–1	1–0	3–0	1–5	10–2		2–0	4–0	2–0	6–0	1–2	8–1
Olympic Charleroi	1–2	0–1	2–2	2–2	3–2	0–3	3–1	2–0	4–2	2–1	1–4	4–1	0–2		1–5	0–1	2–2	1–1	1–0
Standard Liège	2–2	0–4	2–1	5–2	6–1	1–2	5–1	0–1	3–7	4–1	1–0	5–1	1–2	2–1		2–0	3–1	1–1	3–3
Union SG	3–3	2–1	2–2	4–0	2–0	2–2	2–1	0–3	0–4	3–2	1–1	8–1	0–1	2–1	4–0		1–0	2–0	0–4
Sint-Niklase	1–0	0–3	1–0	0–2	0–2	0–2	6–0	1–0	5–2	1–0	5–0	1–0	2–2	1–1	1–0	2–1		0–1	2–5
Tilleur	3–3	2–4	2–1	0–0	0–3	0–1	5–1	1–0	1–0	1–0	2–0	1–2	0–1	3–3	2–0	0–2	0–2		0–0
White Star	1–1	4–1	1–8	2–1	1–4	3–0	3–2	1–4	2–1	2–1	4–2	2–2	2–1	4–1	4–0	4–1	1–1	2–0	

Legend: Blue = home team win; Yellow = draw; Red = away team win.
