= François Sermon =

Belgian footballer (1923–2013)

Personal information
- Date of birth: 31 March 1923
- Date of death: 17 March 2013 (aged 89)
- Position: Midfielder

Youth career
- 1939–1941: Anderlecht

Senior career*
Years	Team	Apps	(Gls)
1941–1953	Anderlecht	273	(69)

International career
1945–1951	Belgium	9	(2)
- * Club domestic league appearances and goals

François Sermon (31 March 1923 – 17 March 2013) was a Belgian footballer who played as a midfielder for Anderlecht and the Belgium national team. He died on 17 March 2013, at the age of 89.
