= 1942–43 Belgian First Division =

40th season of top-tier football in Belgium

Belgian First Division
- Season: 1942–43

Statistics of Belgian First Division in the 1942–43 season.

== Overview ==
Location of teams in Belgian First Division 1942–43

It was contested by 16 teams, and KV Mechelen won the championship.

== League standings ==
Pos	Team	Pld	W	D	L	GF	GA	GD	Pts	Relegation
1	KV Mechelen	30	21	4	5	83	31	+52	46	
2	Beerschot	30	19	6	5	87	40	+47	44	
3	Lierse S.K.	30	17	5	8	95	51	+44	39	
4	K.A.A. Gent	30	17	3	10	63	54	+9	37	
5	Royal Antwerp FC	30	17	1	12	69	48	+21	35	
6	R.S.C. Anderlecht	30	15	4	11	73	53	+20	34	
7	Tilleur	30	10	9	11	52	55	−3	29	
8	Cercle Brugge K.S.V.	30	11	6	13	46	66	−20	28	
9	R.O.C. de Charleroi-Marchienne	30	11	5	14	50	64	−14	27	
10	White Star	30	8	10	12	72	65	+7	26	
11	Royale Union Saint-Gilloise	30	8	8	14	37	42	−5	24	
12	Standard Liège	30	10	4	16	62	66	−4	24	
13	Eendracht Alost	30	10	4	16	45	75	−30	24	
14	CS La Forestoise	30	9	5	16	40	93	−53	23	
15	R.R.C. Bruxelles	30	10	3	17	61	78	−17	23	Relegated to Division I
16	K Boom FC	30	7	3	20	36	90	−54	17	Relegated to Division I

== Results ==
Home \ Away	AAL	AND	ANT	BEE	BOO	CER	RCB	FOR	GNT	LIE	MEC	OLY	STA	TIL	USG	WST
Eendracht Alost		1–3	2–1	1–0	0–2	6–1	3–3	2–3	2–1	2–1	0–2	2–0	0–4	4–4	1–3	3–2
Anderlecht	2–1		4–1	1–2	5–1	2–3	2–2	5–0	4–0	1–1	2–1	4–3	4–5	3–1	4–1	1–1
Antwerp	4–0	4–2		3–2	3–1	1–0	4–2	4–1	1–3	3–2	2–0	6–0	1–2	3–1	2–1	3–1
Beerschot	3–3	2–0	4–2		3–0	4–1	1–1	3–1	2–0	3–0	1–1	3–2	5–1	5–0	1–1	4–2
Boom	1–1	3–2	2–1	0–8		2–2	5–2	1–3	1–3	2–4	1–1	1–2	1–0	2–1	0–2	4–1
Cercle Brugge	0–2	2–0	2–1	2–4	3–2		4–0	1–1	5–1	3–3	0–1	0–0	1–0	0–2	0–2	4–2
Racing Bruxelles	5–2	2–4	3–1	1–3	6–1	2–3		5–0	6–1	4–6	0–2	4–1	3–1	0–1	2–5	0–4
La Forestoise	2–1	2–1	0–8	0–6	3–0	5–1	0–1		0–5	3–2	0–1	2–6	3–1	1–6	0–0	2–2
La Gantoise	4–0	2–4	1–0	3–2	3–0	4–3	1–0	4–1		2–1	2–3	2–1	3–0	3–0	0–2	1–1
Lierse	3–1	2–3	4–1	1–0	1–0	7–1	1–2	10–1	5–1		1–3	4–0	5–3	2–2	5–2	8–0
KV Mechelen	8–0	2–0	2–0	2–2	4–1	6–0	7–1	4–1	5–2	3–4		1–2	2–0	2–0	2–0	6–4
Olympic Charleroi	2–1	0–1	2–4	3–2	5–1	0–2	2–0	1–2	1–3	1–5	1–0		0–5	1–1	3–1	5–2
Standard Liège	0–2	1–5	0–0	3–5	8–1	5–0	5–0	4–1	2–2	1–1	1–3	1–2		2–1	2–3	2–1
Tilleur	5–0	2–2	1–3	2–2	5–0	0–0	4–2	1–1	0–3	1–3	0–5	2–2	2–1		3–1	3–2
Union SG	0–1	1–0	0–1	1–2	3–0	0–1	0–1	1–1	1–1	0–1	2–3	1–1	1–1	0–1		2–2
White Star	6–1	4–2	3–1	2–3	5–0	1–1	4–1	6–0	1–2	2–2	1–1	1–1	8–1	1–1	0–0	

Legend: Blue = home team win; Yellow = draw; Red = away team win.
