= 1947–48 Belgian First Division =

45th season of top-tier football in Belgium

Belgian First Division
- Season: 1947–48

Statistics of Belgian First Division in the 1947–48 season.

== Overview ==
Location of teams in Belgian First Division 1947–48

It was contested by 16 teams, and KV Mechelen won the championship.

== League standings ==
Pos	Team	Pld	W	D	L	GF	GA	GD	Pts	Relegation
1	KV Mechelen	30	18	7	5	70	39	+31	43	
2	R.S.C. Anderlecht	30	17	4	9	72	50	+22	38	
3	R.F.C. de Liège	30	16	4	10	73	62	+11	36	
4	Royal Antwerp FC	30	15	5	10	61	37	+24	35	
5	K.A.A. Gent	30	12	7	11	50	55	−5	31	
6	R.O.C. de Charleroi-Marchienne	30	13	4	13	55	39	+16	30	
7	K Berchem Sport	30	11	7	12	53	59	−6	29	
8	K Boom FC	30	13	3	14	47	53	−6	29	
9	Beerschot	30	13	3	14	59	67	−8	29	
10	Royale Union Saint-Gilloise	30	13	3	14	65	76	−11	29	
11	K. Lyra	30	11	5	14	54	48	+6	27	
12	R.R.C. Bruxelles	30	9	8	13	41	60	−19	26	
13	Standard Liège	30	10	6	14	66	59	+7	26	
14	R. Charleroi S.C.	30	11	4	15	60	73	−13	26	
15	R. Uccle Sport	30	10	3	17	52	67	−15	23	Relegated to Division I
16	Lierse S.K.	30	10	3	17	47	81	−34	23	Relegated to Division I

== Results ==
Home \ Away	AND	ANT	BEE	BRC	BOO	RCB	CHA	GNT	FCL	LIE	LYR	MEC	OLY	STA	USG	UCC
Anderlecht		1–0	5–2	6–0	3–2	3–1	2–0	2–2	2–3	1–0	1–0	1–1	0–3	7–4	2–2	2–0
Antwerp	1–1		5–1	4–1	1–2	2–0	0–0	1–0	0–2	3–0	4–3	4–1	1–0	1–4	8–2	2–0
Beerschot	0–4	1–0		0–0	9–1	0–2	4–2	2–1	1–3	1–3	3–2	4–1	2–1	1–1	2–5	2–1
Berchem	0–1	3–0	2–0		2–0	0–0	0–3	3–0	5–0	2–3	1–1	1–1	1–0	2–1	7–1	2–2
Boom	2–1	1–1	3–4	0–2		4–0	5–1	1–2	3–1	1–2	1–0	0–3	1–0	2–1	0–2	3–1
Racing Bruxelles	4–0	1–4	2–2	1–3	2–2		4–2	2–1	1–2	0–0	1–0	4–4	0–0	3–1	0–6	2–0
Charleroi	4–1	2–1	3–2	5–2	4–0	2–0		3–1	2–4	1–1	1–4	1–6	1–4	3–2	6–1	2–3
La Gantoise	1–0	0–2	0–4	6–4	1–1	1–3	2–0		0–0	1–0	3–1	0–0	3–1	2–2	1–2	3–0
Liège	3–5	4–0	2–3	0–2	2–0	4–2	3–2	5–0		1–3	4–2	1–1	2–1	5–0	3–3	5–4
Lierse	3–7	0–7	0–2	3–2	1–2	6–1	3–3	1–4	3–2		0–4	4–3	2–0	3–1	1–2	0–1
Lyra	0–4	2–1	3–2	1–1	0–2	0–0	7–1	2–2	1–3	4–1		3–0	1–1	2–0	0–2	1–2
Mechelen	2–0	1–1	4–1	2–1	2–1	0–2	2–1	3–0	4–0	2–0	2–1		3–1	4–2	4–1	1–1
Olympic Charleroi	4–0	4–1	3–1	2–2	4–3	1–1	4–0	1–2	3–0	6–0	4–1	0–1		0–3	4–2	1–3
Standard Liège	3–2	0–0	1–2	9–0	0–2	5–0	2–2	1–1	3–3	5–1	1–2	1–4	2–0		4–1	4–2
Union SG	1–4	0–3	5–0	5–1	1–0	3–2	2–1	4–5	3–4	4–1	1–5	0–1	0–1	0–3		2–1
Uccle	2–4	0–3	2–1	2–1	0–2	2–0	1–2	4–5	3–2	8–2	0–2	2–7	1–2	2–0	2–2	

Legend: Blue = home team win; Yellow = draw; Red = away team win.
