= Belgian Pro League =

Belgian association football league

- Belgian Pro League
- Organising body: Pro League
- Founded: 1895; 131 years ago
- Country: Belgium
- Confederation: UEFA
- Number of clubs: 18
- Level on pyramid: 1
- Relegation to: Challenger Pro League
- Domestic cup: Belgian Super Cup
- League cup: Belgian Cup
- International cup(s): UEFA Champions League; UEFA Europa League; UEFA Conference League
- Current champions: Club Brugge (20th title) (2025–26)
- Most championships: Anderlecht (34 titles)
- Most appearances: Raymond Mommens (614)
- Top scorer: Albert De Cleyn (377)
- Broadcaster(s): DAZN (2025–2030)
- Sponsor(s): Jupiler
- Website: proleague.be (in Dutch)
- Current: 2026–27 Belgian Pro League

The Belgian Pro League, officially the Jupiler Pro League (Dutch pronunciation: [ˈʑypilɛr ˈproː ˌlik]) for sponsorship reasons, is a professional association football league in Belgium and the highest level of the Belgian football league system. Contested by 18 clubs from 2026–27 onwards, it operates on a system of promotion and relegation with the Challenger Pro League.

Until 2025–26 season, seasons run from late July to late March, with teams playing 30 matches each in the regular season, and then entering Play-offs I (also known as the Championship Playoff, title playoffs or Champions' play-offs), Play-offs II (also known as the Europa League playoff or Europe play-offs) or Play-offs III (also known as the Relegation play-offs) according to their position in the regular season. Play-offs I are contested by the top-six clubs in the regular season, with each club playing each other twice. The teams finishing in 15th and 16th place are relegated directly, however, the 14th place team plays a promotion-relegation play-off against the 3rd place team of the Challenger Pro League.

The competition was created in 1895 by the Royal Belgian Football Association and was first won by FC Liégeois. Of the 78 clubs to have competed in the first division since its creation, 16 have been crowned champions of Belgium. Anderlecht is the most successful league club with 34 titles, followed by Club Brugge (20), Union Saint-Gilloise (12) and Standard Liège (10). It is currently ranked 8th in the UEFA rankings of leagues based on performances in European competitions over the last five-years. The competition was ranked 3rd when the UEFA first published their ranking in 1979 and also the next year in 1980, which is the best ranking the Belgian First Division has ever achieved.

== History ==
=== Origins (1895–1914) ===
The first league in Belgian football was held in 1895–96 as a round-robin tournament with seven teams: Antwerp FC, FC Brugeois, FC Liégeois, RC de Bruxelles, Léopold Club de Bruxelles, SC de Bruxelles, and Union d'Ixelles. FC Liégeois became the first champion of Belgium. The first eight titles in Belgian football were all won by FC Liégeois or RC de Bruxelles. There was no promotion and relegation system at the time, but the last two finishers (FC Brugeois and Union d'Ixelles) withdrew and a new club entered the competition (Athletic and Running Club de Bruxelles). During the 1896–97 season, SC de Bruxelles withdrew, so the 1897–98 season was played by five clubs. In the seasons 1898–99 and 1899–1900, the football association introduced a new format with two leagues at the top level and a final game in two legs. The format changed back to one league with nine clubs in 1900–01, then again to two leagues from 1901–02 to 1903–04, this time with a final round among the top two teams of each league. In 1904–05, the championship was organised with one league of 11 teams. Athletic and Running Club de Bruxelles withdrew during the season and, from the 1906 season on, a system of promotion and relegation was introduced with the winner of the second division replacing the last-placed team of the first division.

In 1906–07, Union Saint-Gilloise won their fourth consecutive title as RC de Bruxelles had from 1899–1900 to 1902–03. Both clubs claimed the next three titles before CS Brugeois won their first title, finishing one point ahead their rival of FC Brugeois. At the end of the 1907–08 season, the number of teams in the first division was increased from 10 to 12 clubs, with Promotion champion RC de Gand and runner-up ESC Forest being promoted while no first division was relegated. As World War I approached, Daring Club de Bruxelles confirmed its status of challenger, even winning the title in 1911–12 and 1913–14. Only Union Saint-Gilloise could face them in that period, winning the 1912–13 championship with a better goal difference. Since 1911–12, two clubs are relegated each year to the Promotion and two clubs from the Promotion are promoted.

=== After World War I (1919–1945) ===
During World War I, the football championship was suspended. It resumed in 1919–20 with FC Brugeois claiming their first title after five second places, among which were two lost final games and one lost test-match. At the end of the 1920–21 season, the number of teams was increased from 12 to 14, with only Uccle Sport, the last-placed team of the first division, being relegated, and the first three teams from the Promotion being promoted (Standard Club Liégeois, FC Malinois, and RSC Anderlechtois). From 1921–22 to 1931–32, the decade was dominated by teams from the province of Antwerp: Beerschot AC, with Raymond Braine, won their first five titles, Antwerp FC their first two and the small club of Liersche SK (led by striker Bernard Voorhoof) won their first one in 1931–32. The challengers at the time were CS Brugeois (two titles in that period), Union Saint-Gilloise (one title), Daring Club de Bruxelles and Standard Club Liégeois. Starting 25 December 1932, Union Saint-Gilloise had a record 60 games unbeaten run in the championship (spanning three seasons), winning the 1932–33, 1933–34, and 1934–35 titles. The rival of Union during this period was Daring Club de Bruxelles. They claimed the next two championships. Following the come-back of player Raymond Braine to Beerschot, the Antwerp club won the last two titles before World War II.

On 10 May 1940, German troops invaded Belgium and the seasons 1939–40 and 1940–41 were suspended. The competition resumed in September 1941 and Liersche SK won their second title. At the end of the season, no club was relegated and the number of clubs was increased from 14 to 16. The next season, Liersche SK lost three key players (two of them in a bomb attack and the other one due to a heavy injury sustained on the pitch) and they ended at 3rd place while the neighbours of KV Mechelen became champion for the first time in their history. In 1943–44, Antwerp FC won the title. The league was suspended again in 1944–45 because of World War II.

=== After World War II (1945–1980) ===
The league resumed play in 1945–46 with a title for KV Mechelen. At the start of that season, the First Division went from 16 to 19 clubs, with three clubs promoted from the First Division and no team being relegated. The top scorer award was also introduced that season, won by Bert De Cleyn from KV Mechelen. Two seasons later, five clubs were relegated and two promoted. In 1946–47, RSC Anderlechtois won their first championship with Jef Mermans as the key striker and they dominated the Belgian football over the next 9 years with 6 more titles, with KV Mechelen (in 1947–48) and FC Liégeois (in 1951–52 and 1952–53) claiming the remaining titles. The Belgian Golden Shoe award was introduced in 1954, rewarding the best player in the first division for the past calendar year, thus over two half seasons.

In the late 1950s Standard lifted the trophy for the first time in 1957–58 and they eventually became one of Anderlecht's biggest rivals in the league (until their 8th title in 1982–83). The other titles in the late 1950s were won by Antwerp FC and Anderlecht. In the 1960s, the Anderlecht team of Paul Van Himst claimed six titles (with the Belgian record of five consecutives titles between 1963–64 and 1967–68), while Standard claimed three and Lierse one. Standard, with key player Wilfried Van Moer, won the first two titles of the 1970s, which gave them their only treble so far (together with the 1968–69 title). 1974–75 was the only season with as many as 20 clubs in the league's history. Belgian clubs started to perform well in European Cups in the 1970s, with Anderlecht winning the 1975–76 European Cup Winners' Cup and Club Brugge losing to Liverpool F.C. in the 1975–76 UEFA Cup final. The following season, Anderlecht lost to Hamburger SV in the Cup Winners' Cup final and in 1977–78 won for the second time, while Club Brugge lost the European Cup to Liverpool F.C.. In the Belgian First Division, Club Brugge claimed four titles in the decade, while Anderlecht claimed two and R White Daring Molenbeek (the successor of Daring Club de Bruxelles) with Johan Boskamp and KSK Beveren with goalkeeper Jean-Marie Pfaff each claimed their first Belgian championship.

=== Recent years (1980–present) ===
In the 1980s, the European successes continued for Belgian clubs with Standard reaching the 1981–82 European Cup Winners' Cup final, Anderlecht winning the 1982–83 UEFA Cup and losing the next UEFA Cup final and KV Mechelen winning the 1987–88 European Cup Winners' Cup. In the domestic league, Anderlecht won their 20th title in 1986–87, which was also the 4th of the decade. Club Brugge and Standard each won two titles in the 1980s and KSK Beveren and KV Mechelen one each.

In the 1990s, Belgium's teams performances were diminished in European competitions, with only RSC Anderlecht and Royal Antwerp FC reaching the European Cup Winners' Cup final, respectively in 1989–90 and in 1992–93. In the home league, RSC Anderlecht took four titles during the decade, while Club Brugge cemented their status as main contender with four titles. The remaining two titles went to Lierse SK and newcomer Racing Genk. The 2000s brought a bright European start, with Anderlecht reaching the second group stage in the 2000–01 UEFA Champions League, but the rest of the decade Belgian clubs were again not very successful in European competitions. In the league, RSC Anderlecht won five titles in the decade, with Club Brugge claiming two titles and Racing Genk taking their second title. At the end of the decade, Standard Liège returned as a title contender with two consecutive titles, 25 years after their 1982–83 title. At the end of the 2000s, the highest level in Belgian football was reshaped, with a play-off round after the regular season. RSC Anderlecht won the first championship in this new format, which was their 30th title. After another two titles for Anderlecht, KAA Gent was the surprise winner of the Championship in 2015. The following seven years, Club Brugge would win the league five times. Anderlecht and Genk won the title on the other occasions. Union Saint-Gilloise came close to shocking the footballing world by almost winning the league in 2021–22. In their first season at the top flight in 48 years, they started the play-offs in first place, but came just short of denying Club Brugge their third consecutive title.

== Competition format and naming ==
The competition format has undergone several changes since 2009, but the most significant one was the introduction of playoffs after completion of the regular season from the 2009–10 season. At that time the number of teams also decreased from 18 to 16 and there was the introduction of matches being played during the Christmas holidays. The change was initially met with criticism, with many at that time pointing out that the Netherlands' Eredivisie has already abandoned playoffs after three seasons. Anderlecht won the first championship in this new format, the Belgian Pro League 2009-10, which was their 30th Belgian championship.

Following the 2015–16 season, the number of professional teams in Belgium was brought down to 24, which mostly affected the teams playing at the second level of the Belgian football pyramid as the Belgian Second Division was replaced by the Belgian First Division B and the number of teams dropped to eight.

Due to the redesign of the UEFA competitions and the extra burden on the football season calendar (4 extra matchdays for clubs in Europe), there was a need to reduce the number of matches in the Belgian League. Despite the playoff format being very successful with added excitement and decisions often at the very end of the season, the clubs could not agree on a format with fewer teams or altered playoffs and hence it was decided end of February 2025 to return to a system without playoffs from the 2026–27 season onwards, while expanding the top division from 16 to 18 teams.

Matches are usually played on Saturdays at 20.00; however, some matchdays are played on Wednesdays. Furthermore, in recent years, some games are played on Fridays or during the weekend at different times (e.g., Saturday at 18.00 or Sunday at 13.00 or 20.00), as decided by the owner of television rights. Each team playing the Pro League must have been granted the Belgian professional football license guaranteeing the club has no excessive debts, has a secure stadium, etc. This was introduced in the 2001–02 season to decrease the number of teams in the division and ensure a higher level of professionalism in the clubs playing in the top flight of Belgian football. Originally, clubs that could not get the license were supposed not to be replaced (and sent to the third division). However, it is still not effective as, for example, KSK Beveren finished 18th (last) in 2001–2002, but was saved as KSC Eendracht Aalst (17th) and RWD Molenbeek (10th) were refused their license.

=== Regular season ===
Each of the 16 competitors in the Pro League plays every other team twice in the regular season, for a total of 30 matches between August and April. A win earns three points and a draw earns one point. Teams are ranked by total points, then by total wins and finally by goal difference, number of scored goals, number of away goals, and number of away wins. If teams are still level, a test-match is played in two legs to determine the final order in the standings. A playoff phase is then played from May.

=== Championship Play-off ===
The point system in the championship playoff is the same as during the regular season, except that each team starts with half of the points they won in the regular season, rounded up to the nearest integer. The points gained by rounding are deducted in the case of a tie.

The top six teams from the regular season enter the championship playoff, with the first-placed team winning the championship of Belgium. Each team plays their opponents twice and the teams are ranked by points, points from rounding, wins, etc. as in the regular season.

=== All time ranking in the Championship Play-off ===
Since the introduction of the playoff system in 2009
Last updated following the 2025-26 season, teams ranked by total points, then goal difference

| Rank | Club | Seasons | Played | Won | Drew | Lost | Points | Avg. Points per Match | GF | GA | GD | Titles | Last participation |
|---|---|---|---|---|---|---|---|---|---|---|---|---|---|
| 1 | Club Brugge | 16 | 148 | 78 | 31 | 39 | 265 | 1.79 | 271 | 168 | +103 | 6 | 2025–26 |
| 2 | Anderlecht | 15 | 142 | 60 | 32 | 50 | 212 | 1.49 | 211 | 185 | +26 | 5 | 2025–26 |
| 3 | Genk | 11 | 102 | 47 | 19 | 36 | 160 | 1.6 | 155 | 140 | +15 | 2 | 2024–25 |
| 4 | Standard Liège | 7 | 70 | 33 | 15 | 22 | 114 | 1.63 | 115 | 92 | +23 | | 2018–19 |
| 5 | Gent | 10 | 100 | 29 | 26 | 36 | 113 | 1.13 | 115 | 157 | −42 | 1 | 2025–26 |
| 6 | Union SG | 5 | 42 | 23 | 8 | 11 | 75 | 1.79 | 68 | 38 | +30 | 1 | 2025–26 |
| 7 | Antwerp | 6 | 48 | 13 | 10 | 25 | 49 | 1.05 | 48 | 81 | −33 | 1 | 2024–25 |
| 8 | Zulte Waregem | 5 | 50 | 12 | 11 | 27 | 47 | 0.94 | 66 | 102 | −36 | | 2016–17 |
| 9 | Charleroi | 3 | 30 | 7 | 8 | 15 | 29 | 0.97 | 32 | 50 | −18 | | 2017–18 |
| 10 | Kortrijk | 3 | 30 | 8 | 5 | 17 | 29 | 0.97 | 36 | 55 | −19 | | 2014–15 |
| 11 | Sint-Truiden | 2 | 20 | 7 | 6 | 7 | 27 | 1.35 | 23 | 21 | 2 | | 2025–26 |
| 12 | Oostende | 2 | 20 | 6 | 5 | 9 | 23 | 1.15 | 28 | 36 | −8 | | 2016–17 |
| 13 | Lokeren | 3 | 30 | 4 | 7 | 19 | 19 | 0.63 | 38 | 66 | −28 | | 2013–14 |
| 14 | Cercle Brugge | 1 | 10 | 3 | 4 | 3 | 13 | 1.3 | 13 | 13 | 0 | | 2023–24 |
| 15 | Mechelen | 1 | 10 | 1 | 3 | 6 | 6 | 0.6 | 9 | 24 | −15 | | 2025–26 |

==== Comprehensive team results by season ====
Legend

- 1st — Champions
- 2nd — Runners-up
- 3rd — Third place
- • — Did not qualify
- NH — Not held due to COVID-19
- × — Playing in a lower division
- D — Defunct

| Team | 2009–10 | 2010–11 | 2011–12 | 2012–13 | 2013–14 | 2014–15 | 2015–16 | 2016–17 | 2017–18 | 2018–19 | 2019–20 | 2020–21 | 2021–22 | 2022–23 | 2023–24 | 2024–25 | 2025–26 |
|---|---|---|---|---|---|---|---|---|---|---|---|---|---|---|---|---|---|
| Anderlecht | 1st | 3rd | 1st | | | 3rd | 2nd | 1st | 3rd | 6th | NH | 4th | 3rd | • | 3rd | 4th | 4th |
| Antwerp | × | | | | | | | | • | 4th | NH | 3rd | 4th | 1st | 6th | 5th | • |
| Cercle Brugge | • | | | | | | × | | | • | NH | • | | | 4th | • | • |
| Charleroi | • | | × | • | | 5th | • | 5th | 6th | • | NH | • | | | | | |
| Club Brugge | 3rd | 4th | 2nd | 3rd | | 2nd | 1st | 2nd | 1st | 2nd | NH | 1st | | 4th | 1st | 2nd | 1st |
| Genk | • | 1st | 3rd | 5th | 6th | • | 4th | • | 5th | 1st | NH | 2nd | • | 2nd | 5th | 3rd | • |
| Gent | 2nd | 5th | 4th | • | | 1st | 3rd | 3rd | 4th | 5th | NH | • | | | | 6th | 5th |
| Kortrijk | 5th | • | 6th | • | | 6th | • | | | | NH | • | | | | | × |
| Lokeren | • | 6th | • | 6th | 5th | • | | | | | NH | D | | | | | |
| Mechelen | • | | | | | | | | | × | NH | • | | | | | 6th |
| Oostende | × | | | | • | | 5th | 4th | • | | NH | • | | | × | D | |
| Sint-Truiden | 4th | • | | × | | | • | | | | NH | • | | | | | 3rd |
| Standard Liège | • | 2nd | 5th | 4th | 2nd | 4th | • | | 2nd | 3rd | NH | • | | | | | |
| Union SG | × | | | | | | | | | | NH | × | 2nd | 3rd | 2nd | 1st | 2nd |
| Zulte Waregem | 6th | • | | 2nd | 4th | • | 6th | | • | | NH | • | | | × | | • |

=== Europa League Playoff ===
Until 2016, the teams ranked 7 to 14 after the regular season enter the playoffs 2, with teams ranked 7th, 9th, 12th, and 14th entering group A and teams ranked 8th, 10th, 11th, and 13th entering group B. In each group, each team plays each of its three opponents twice. The winner of each group played the final game in two legs to determine the winner of the playoffs 2. The winner of the playoffs 2 then plays a home and away game against either the fourth-place or fifth-place team from the playoffs 1 for the final Europa League ticket, with the opponent depending on whether the Belgian Cup winner ended in the top four of the playoff 1 or not.

From 2016, the system was changed as now the teams ranked 7 to 16 are joined by six teams from the Belgian First Division B and divided into four groups of four teams. The winners of each groups now play a single match to determine the overall playoff winner, with the winner playing the fifth-placed team from playoff 1 in a single match for the final Europa League ticket.

=== Relegation playoff ===
Until 2015, a relegation playoff was played between the teams ranked 15th and 16th after the regular season. It consisted of five games between the two teams. The 15th-placed team started the playoffs with three points whereas the 16th-placed team started from zero. The loser of the relegation playoff was relegated to the second division. The winner of that playoff had to enter the Belgian Second Division final round with three teams from the second division. The winner of this Final Round played in the First Division the season thereafter.

From 2015 to 2023, the relegation playoff ceased to exist, as now the 16th-place team relegates directly, whereas the 15th placed team takes part in the Europa League playoff. The 2015–16 Belgian Pro League was an exception as during that season the 15th placed team did not take part in any playoff, with the season for that team ending after the regular season.

From 2023 onwards, the relegation play-off was played between the teams ranked 13th and 16th after the regular season. After the relegation play-off battle, two teams are relegated directly to the Challenger Pro League and one team will play against 3rd place of Challenger Pro League due to avoid relegation.

=== Qualification for European competitions ===
For the 2010–11 season, the Belgian champion and the runner-up qualify for the 3rd UEFA Champions League qualifying round (of 4). The Belgian Cup winner (or the Cup finalist if the Cup winner finished first or second in the league) qualifies for the play-off of the UEFA Europa League. The third-placed team (or the fourth-placed team if the Cup winner finished third in the league) qualifies for the 3rd and last qualifying round and the winner of the game between the play-offs 2 winner and the fourth-placed team (or the fifth-placed team if the Cup winner finished fourth) qualifies for the 2nd qualifying round.

=== Naming ===
- 1895–1904: Championship Cup
- 1904–1926: First Division
- 1926–1952: Division of Honour
- 1952–2016: First Division
- 2016–2022: First Division A
- 2022–present: Belgian Pro League

== Media coverage ==
The Belgian Football Association sells the television rights for the Belgian First Division every three years. In 2005, the newly created Belgian TV channel Proximus TV bought the TV rights for a record amount of €36 million per season until 2019–20.

In May 2008, the rights were again sold to Belgacom TV in association with both public broadcasters VRT (Dutch) and RTBF (French) for an amount of €45.7 million per season. RTBF and VRT thus received the rights to show summaries of first division games, as well as rights to a weekly magazine on the competition. Belgacom TV received the rights to show each game in the competition.

On 12 June 2020 Aser's Eleven Sports and the Pro League reached an agreement on the new domestic and international media contract for the coming five years. As exclusive global rights holder, Eleven Sports will air the rights of all Pro League competitions for the next five seasons from 2020–21 until 2024–25, with both public broadcasters Play 4 (Dutch) and RTBF (French) lands the rights for highlights again.

== Clubs ==
=== Champions ===
| Club | Number Of Championships | Number Of Runner-ups | Years Of Championships |
|---|---|---|---|
| RSC Anderlecht | 34 | 21 | 1946–47, 1948–49, 1949–50, 1950–51, 1953–54, 1954–55, 1955–56, 1958–59, 1961–62, 1963–64, 1964–65, 1965–66, 1966–67, 1967–68, 1971–72, 1973–74, 1980–81, 1984–85, 1985–86, 1986–87, 1990–91, 1992–93, 1993–94, 1994–95, 1999–2000, 2000–01, 2003–04, 2005–06, 2006–07, 2009–10, 2011–12, 2012–13, 2013–14, 2016–17 |
| Club Brugge KV | 20 | 24 | 1919–20, 1972–73, 1975–76, 1976–77, 1977–78, 1979–80, 1987–88, 1989–90, 1991–92, 1995–96, 1997–98, 2002–03, 2004–05, 2015–16, 2017–18, 2019–20, 2020–21, 2021–22, 2023–24, 2025–26 |
| R Union Saint-Gilloise | 12 | 11 | 1903–04, 1904–05, 1905–06, 1906–07, 1908–09, 1909–10, 1912–13, 1922–23, 1932–33, 1933–34, 1934–35, 2024–25 |
| R Standard Liège | 10 | 13 | 1957–58, 1960–61, 1962–63, 1968–69, 1969–70, 1970–71, 1981–82, 1982–83, 2007–08, 2008–09 |
| K Beerschot VAC | 7 | 7 | 1921–22, 1923–24, 1924–25, 1925–26, 1927–28, 1937–38, 1938–39 |
| Racing de Bruxelles | 6 | 4 | 1896–97, 1899–1900, 1900–01, 1901–02, 1902–03, 1907–08 |
| R Antwerp FC | 5 | 11 | 1928–29, 1930–31, 1943–44, 1956–57, 2022–23 |
| RFC Liège | 5 | 3 | 1895–96, 1897–98, 1898–99, 1951–52, 1952–53 |
| Daring de Bruxelles | 5 | 4 | 1911–12, 1913–14, 1920–21, 1935–36, 1936–37 |
| KV Mechelen | 4 | 5 | 1942–43, 1945–46, 1947–48, 1988–89 |
| KRC Genk | 4 | 4 | 1998–99, 2001–02, 2010–11, 2018–19 |
| K Lierse SK | 4 | 2 | 1931–32, 1941–42, 1959–60, 1996–97 |
| Cercle Brugge KSV | 3 | 0 | 1910–11, 1926–27, 1929–30 |
| KSK Beveren | 2 | 0 | 1978–79, 1983–84 |
| KAA Gent | 1 | 3 | 2014–15 |
| RWD Molenbeek | 1 | 0 | 1974–75 |
| K Berchem Sport | 0 | 3 | |
| R Charleroi SC | 0 | 1 | |
| KSC Lokeren | 0 | 1 | |
| SV Zulte Waregem | 0 | 1 | |
| K Sint-Truiden VV | 0 | 1 | |
| R Léopold Club | 0 | 1 | |
| ROC de Charleroi | 0 | 1 | |
| KRC Mechelen | 0 | 1 | |
| K Beringen FC | 0 | 1 | |

- bold clubs play in top flight
- italic clubs dissolved or merged

=== Most seasons in First Division A ===
Only clubs with more than 50 seasons in first division listed:

| Matriculate | Club | № of seasons: (119 total) | Period |
|---|---|---|---|
| 16 | Standard Liège | 103 | 1909–1914, 1921– |
| 1 | Antwerp FC | 101 | 1895–1900, 1901–1968, 1970–1998, 2000–2004, 2017– |
| 3 | Club Brugge KV | 100 | 1895–1896, 1898–1928, 1929–1933, 1935–1939, 1946–1947, 1949–1951, 1959– |
| 35 | RSC Anderlecht | 91 | 1921–1923, 1924–1926, 1927–1928, 1929–1931, 1935– |
| 7 | KAA Gent | 83 | 1913–1929, 1936–1967, 1968–1971, 1980–1988, 1989– |
| 12 | Cercle Brugge | 83 | 1899–1936, 1938–1946, 1961–1966, 1971–1978, 1979–1997, 2003–2015, 2018– |
| 13 | Beerschot VAC | 81 | 1900–1906, 1907–1981, 1982–1991 |
| 30 | K Lierse SK | 74 | 1927–1948, 1953–1986, 1988–2007, 2010–2015 |
| 25 | KV Mechelen | 71 | 1921–1922, 1924–1925, 1926–1927, 1928–1956, 1963–1964, 1965–1969, 1971–1977, 1981–1982, 1983–1997, 1999–2001, 2002–2003, 2007–2018, 2019– |
| 4 | RFC Liège | 67 | 1895–1910, 1912–1913, 1923–1924, 1945–1995 |
| 10 | Union SG | 59 | 1901–1949, 1951–1963, 1964–1965, 1968–1973, 2021– |
| 22 | Charleroi SC | 57 | 1947–1957, 1966–1971, 1974–1980, 1985–2011, 2012– |

- bold clubs play in First Division
- italic clubs dissolved or merged

=== Clubs that played in First Division ===
A total of 78 clubs have played in the first division since its creation in 1895. Among those 78 clubs, 44 still exist and the 30 other clubs either went into liquidation or merged with another club.

=== Members for 2026–27 ===
The 2026–27 season will again feature 18 teams.

Locations of the 2026–27 Belgian Pro League teams

| Club name | City | Last season position | First season of current spell in top division | Result 24–25 | Result 23–24 | Result 22–23 | Result 21–22 | Result 20–21 |
|---|---|---|---|---|---|---|---|---|
| Anderlecht | Brussels (Anderlecht) | 4th | 1935–36 | 4th | 3rd | 11th | 3rd | 4th |
| Antwerp | Antwerp | 11th | 2017–18 | 5th | 6th | 1st | 4th | 3rd |
| Beveren | Beveren | 1st (CPL) | 2026–27 | 4th (CPL) | 8th (CPL) | 2nd (CPL) | 3rd (D1B) | 17th |
| Cercle Brugge | Bruges | 14th | 2018–19 | 14th | 4th | 6th | 10th | 16th |
| Charleroi | Charleroi | 9th | 2012–13 | 7th | 13th | 9th | 7th | 13th |
| Club Brugge | Bruges | 1st | 1959–60 | 2nd | 1st | 4th | 1st | 1st |
| Genk | Genk | 7th | 1996–97 | 3rd | 5th | 2nd | 6th | 2nd |
| Gent | Ghent | 5th | 1989–90 | 6th | 7th | 5th | 5th | 5th |
| Kortrijk | Kortrijk | 2nd (CPL) | 2026–27 | 15th | 14th | 14th | 13th | 14th |
| La Louvière | La Louvière | 15th | 2025–26 | 2nd (CPL) | 1st (NatD1) | 4th (NatD1) | 1st (D2 ACFF) | 4th (D2 ACFF) |
| Lommel | Lommel | 5th (CPL) | 2026–27 | 11th (CPL) | 4th (CPL) | 7th (CPL) | 6th (D1B) | 3rd (D1B) |
| Mechelen | Mechelen | 6th | 2019–20 | 9th | 8th | 13th | 8th | 6th |
| OH Leuven | Leuven | 12th | 2020–21 | 12th | 10th | 10th | 11th | 11th |
| Sint-Truiden | Sint-Truiden | 3rd | 2015–16 | 13th | 9th | 12th | 9th | 15th |
| Standard Liège | Liège | 8th | 1921–22 | 11th | 12th | 7th | 14th | 8th |
| Union SG | Brussels (Forest) | 2nd | 2021–22 | 1st | 2nd | 3rd | 2nd | 1st (D1B) |
| Westerlo | Westerlo | 10th | 2022–23 | 8th | 11th | 8th | 1st (D1B) | 4th (D1B) |
| Zulte Waregem | Waregem | 13th | 2025–26 | 1st (CPL) | 5th (CPL) | 17th | 16th | 10th |

== Players ==
Players in the Belgian First Division can be of any nationality and a club can sign as many foreign players as desired. The first club to start a game with 11 foreign players was KSC Lokeren in 2001. Every year, players are elected for Belgian Golden Shoe awards, the highest awards a player can receive in Belgian competitions, but also for Belgian professional football awards. Players with African descent, origin or nationality can claim a Belgian Ebony Shoe award. Players compete also every season for the Belgian First Division top scorer, since the 1945–46 season.

=== Top scorers ===
All-time top scorers in the Belgian First Division
| Rank | Player | Goals |
|---|---|---|
| 1 | Albert De Cleyn | 377 |
| 2 | Joseph Mermans | 339 |
| 3 | Bernard Voorhoof | 281 |
| 4 | Arthur Ceuleers | 280 |
| 5 | Rik Coppens | 258 |
| 6 | Erwin Vandenbergh | 252 |
| 7 | Paul Van Himst | 237 |
| 8 | Jan Ceulemans | 230 |
As of 16 July 2000

Erwin Vandenbergh is the only player to have claimed the top scorer title four consecutive times, between 1979–80 and 1982–83 (the first three times while at Lierse SK and the last time while at RSC Anderlecht). He is also the player to have claimed the most Belgian First Division top scorer titles in his career (six times with three different clubs: three times with Lierse SK, twice with RSC Anderlecht and once with KAA Gent). Victor Wegria and Josip Weber won the title three consecutive times (resp. between 1958–59 and 1960–61 while at RFC Liégeois and between 1991–92 and 1993–94 while at Cercle Brugge KSV). Wegria eventually finished top scorer a 4th time in 1962–63 still with RFC Liégeois, making him the second player with the most top scorer titles in the history of Belgian First Division top scorers.

The introduction of this title of honour in 1945 was maybe a little too late for first winner Albert De Cleyn as this player has scored the most goals in the history of the Belgian First Division since 1895 (350 goals in 395 games between 1932 and 1954 with KV Mechelen), though he won the top scorer title only once. Other players in the top ten of the all-time top scorer ranking in the Belgian First Division include Joseph Mermans (three times top scorer, 339 goals overall in 382 games with RSC Anderlecht), Bernard Voorhoof (Belgium national football team top scorer, 281 goals in 473 matches with Lierse SK), Rik Coppens (three times top scorer), Erwin Vandenbergh and Paul Van Himst (Belgium top scorer with Bernard Voorhoof, three times top scorer).

The first foreign player to claim the title was Dutchman Jan Mulder in 1966–67 with RSC Anderlecht. Since then, 25 foreign players have finished top scorer. Only three foreign players claimed the trophy more than once: Josip Weber (twice as a Croat and once as a Belgian), Austrian Alfred Riedl and most recently Frenchman Jérémy Perbet.

== International results by Belgian clubs ==
- See: International results by Belgian clubs

== See also ==
- Belgian Cup
- Belgian First Division B – Football league in Belgium
- Belgian Football Association – Governing body of association football in Belgium
- Belgian football league system
- Belgian Super Cup
- Football in Belgium
- Sports league attendances
