= Olympic Charleroi =

Belgian football club

- Full name: Royal Olympic Club Charleroi
- Nickname: Les Dogues (The Mastiffs)
- Founded: 20 September 1911; 115 years ago
- Ground: Stade de la Neuville, Belgium
- Capacity: 8,000
- Chairman: Patrick Roosens
- Manager: Arnauld Mercier
- League: Belgian Division 1
- 2025–26: Challenger Pro League, 17th of 17 (relegated)
- Website: olympic-charleroi.be
Home colours	Away colours

Royal Olympic Club Charleroi, commonly referred to as Olympique Charleroi and abbreviated as ROCC, is a Belgian association football based in Charleroi, Hainaut. The club compete in the Challenger Pro League, the second tier of the Belgian football after promotion from Belgian Division 1 ACFF in 2024–25. Nicknamed Les Dogues (The Mastiffs), Olympic Charleroi have played their home games at Stade de la Neuville, since 1920. The club's colors are white and black, and it is registered under matricule 246.

Founded in 1911, the club first played in the Belgian Third Division before earning promotion to the Second Division in 1936. They reached the top tier in 1937 and achieved their highest league finish as runners-up in 1947. Following a period of fluctuating fortunes, including relegation in 1955 and a series of brief promotions and relegations, Olympic spent several decades in the lower divisions. In 2000, the club merged with RA Marchienne, and later returned to the third division in 2006. In 2019, Olympic merged with Châtelet-Farciennes SC and was renamed Royal Olympic Club Charleroi Châtelet Farciennes, before reverting to its original name in 2020.

== History ==
=== Formation and early years (1911–1947) ===
Olympic Club Caroloregian Lodelinsart was established on 20 September 1911 by 17-year-old Jules Ponsaert, and joined the Union Belge des Sociétés de Sports Athlétiques (Belgian Football Association; UBSSA) in 1912 and later registered with the Royal Belgian Football Association (RBFA) in June 1913. In 1914, the club adopted the name Olympic Club de Charleroi. During the 1920s, Olympic made its first appearance in the Belgian Third Division. The club gradually rose through the ranks, winning the third-division title in 1936 and earning promotion to the Belgian Second Division.

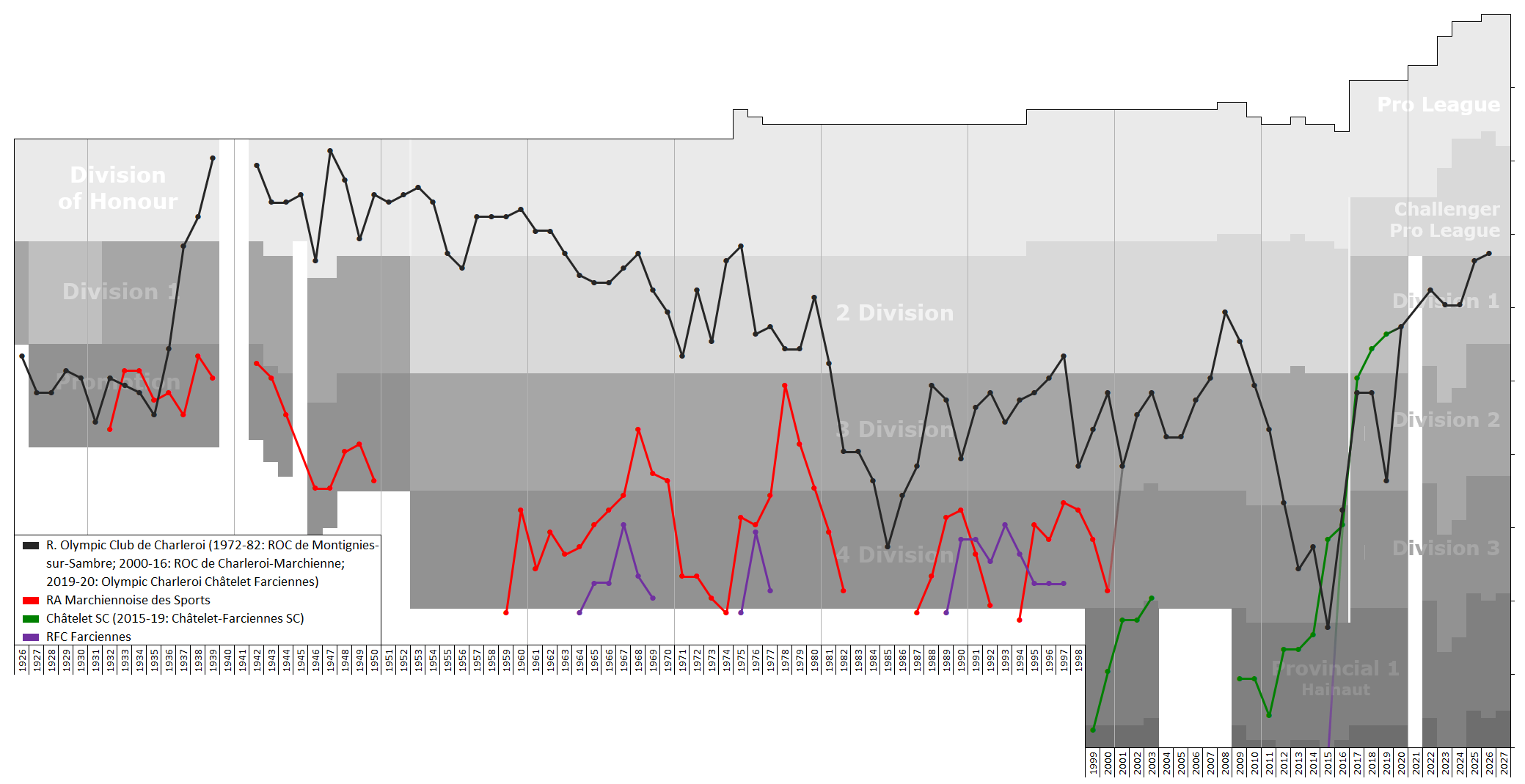
Historical chart of Olympic Charleroi league performance

Success came quickly; in 1937, under the presidency of Dr. Gaston Gianolla, Olympic won the second division title in the B series and achieved promotion to the top tier. The same year, the club celebrated its 25th anniversary and received royal patronage, becoming Royal Olympic Club de Charleroi.

Olympic's debut in the first division was marked by a strong showing, including a third-place finish after two seasons. Although competitive, the club's performance declined during World War II. In 1947, Olympic recorded its best-ever league result, finishing as runners-up, just two points behind champions Anderlecht.

=== Fall from first division (1947–1981) ===
From 1947 onward, Olympic faced local competition from Sporting Charleroi in the first division. The club experienced fluctuating fortunes, remaining mid-table for several seasons before being relegated in 1955. This drop was primarily caused by the ineligibility of player Jacques Leghait, leading to eight forfeited matches and a five-point penalty.

The club rebounded quickly, finishing second in the 1956 second division campaign and regaining its top-tier status. However, Olympic struggled to maintain consistency and was relegated again in 1963. Over the next two decades, the club became a second-division staple, with brief promotions in 1968 and 1975, each lasting only one season.

In 1972, Olympic was renamed Royal Olympic Club de Montignies-sur-Sambre, reflecting its ties to Montignies-sur-Sambre. This name change was reversed in 1982, restoring its original identity.

=== Era in third division (1981–2006) ===
Logo of Royal Olympic Club de Charleroi-Marchienne (2000–2019).

In 1981, Olympic was relegated to the Belgian Third Division, ending nearly half a century in the top two tiers. This marked the beginning of a challenging period. Consistently finishing near the bottom of its third-division group, the club was relegated further to the Belgian Fourth Division in 1984.

After stabilising for a season, Olympic won its fourth-division group in 1986, securing a return to the third division. A resurgence came in 1996 when the club won the third-division title. However, its second-division campaign in 1996–97 was short-lived, lasting only one season before relegation.

In 2000, Olympic merged with neighbouring RA Marchienne (matricule 278) and became Royal Olympic Club de Charleroi-Marchienne (ROCCM). This merger aimed to consolidate resources and strengthen the club's presence in the lower divisions.

=== Promotion to second division (2007–2009) ===
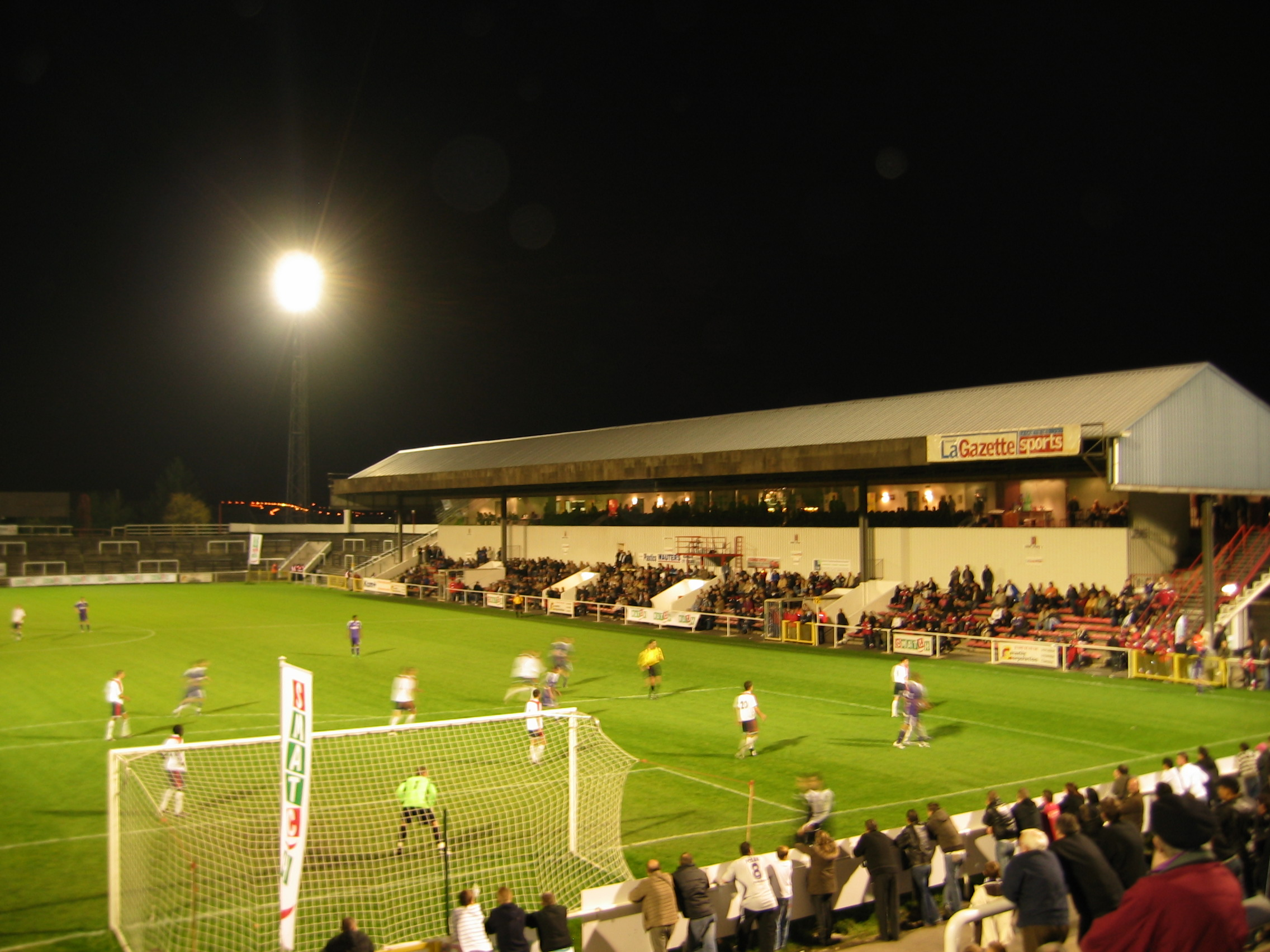
Olympic Charleroi's Stade de la Neuville in 2008, following their return after safety-related relocation.

Olympic returned to prominence by winning the third-division title in the 2006–07 season. This achievement earned the club promotion to the second division after a ten-year absence. Due to safety concerns, home games were temporarily held at Sporting Charleroi's Stade du Pays de Charleroi before returning to Stade de la Neuville.

The 2007–08 season began promisingly, but the club faltered and finished mid-table, narrowly avoiding relegation. Olympic secured its licence for the 2008–09 season but struggled again, ultimately finishing 15th. After losing in the relegation playoffs, the club returned to the third division.

=== Return to third division and decline (2009–2019) ===
Olympic remained competitive in the third division, achieving a second-place finish in 2009. However, financial problems began to mount, with €200,000 in debt and unpaid wages reported by 2011. On 10 October 2011, the club was declared bankrupt, though its youth teams were permitted to complete their seasons.

An investment group led by Adem Sahin revived Olympic in 2012. The club navigated the Belgian Provincial Leagues, fluctuating between the fourth and first divisions in the provincial tiers, before returning to the third division in 2016. During this period, it restored its historical name, Royal Olympic Club de Charleroi.

=== New merger and return to roots (2019–present) ===
In 2019, Olympic merged with Châtelet-Farciennes SC (matricule 725) to form R. Olympic Charleroi Châtelet Farciennes. The merged entity retained Olympic’s matricule and competed in the Belgian Division 1, the highest level of the Belgian amateur league system. In 2020, the club reverted to its historic name, Royal Olympic Club Charleroi.

On 4 May 2025, Olympic Charleroi secured the ACFF championship title in the 2024–25 Belgian Division 1 following a 4–2 victory against Royal Stockay. The result confirmed the club's promotion to the Challenger Pro League for the following season, marking its return to the Belgian second tier after a 17-year absence. They were immediately relegated back to Division 1 in their first year back in the Pro League.

== Current squad ==
As of 2 October 2026

Note: Flags indicate national team as defined under FIFA eligibility rules; some limited exceptions apply. Players may hold more than one non-FIFA nationality.

No.	Pos.	Nation	Player
1	GK	BEL	Andrea Latragna
3	DF	CMR	Karl Ndedi
4	DF	FRA	Brian Silva
5	MF	BEL	Luca Monticelli
8	MF	FRA	Jérémie Lioka
10	MF	MTQ	Thomas Ephestion
11	MF	BEL	Mohamed Mouhli
16	DF	BEL	Noah Stassin
17	DF	BEL	Luca Ferrara
18	MF	LUX	Rayan Berberi
19	MF	BEL	Soulaimane Berradi
20	DF	BEL	Salif Kere
22	DF	BEL	Clément Deschryver
23	MF	MAR	Sofian Kiyine

No.	Pos.	Nation	Player
27	GK	BEL	Maxime Vandermeulen
28	DF	BEL	Alexandro Calut
31	GK	GEQ	Aitor Embela
32	FW	NED	Jay-David Mbalanda (on loan from STVV)
40	GK	BEL	Matthias Van Hecke
42	DF	BEL	Jason Kaluanga
45	FW	BEL	Sam Sylla
62	DF	FRA	Axel Benoît
71	FW	BEL	Tyron Crame
81	MF	BEL	Kerem Asil
97	DF	FRA	Alexis Calant
—	DF	COD	Gaël Kakudji

== Honours ==
- Belgian Division 1
  - Winners (1): 2024–25
