= RFC Tilleur =

Belgian football club

R.F.C. Tilleur-Saint-Nicolas was a Belgian football club from the municipality of Saint-Nicolas, a suburb of Liège. It was created in 1899 (127 years ago) as Tilleur F.C. and was assigned the matricule n°21.

== History ==
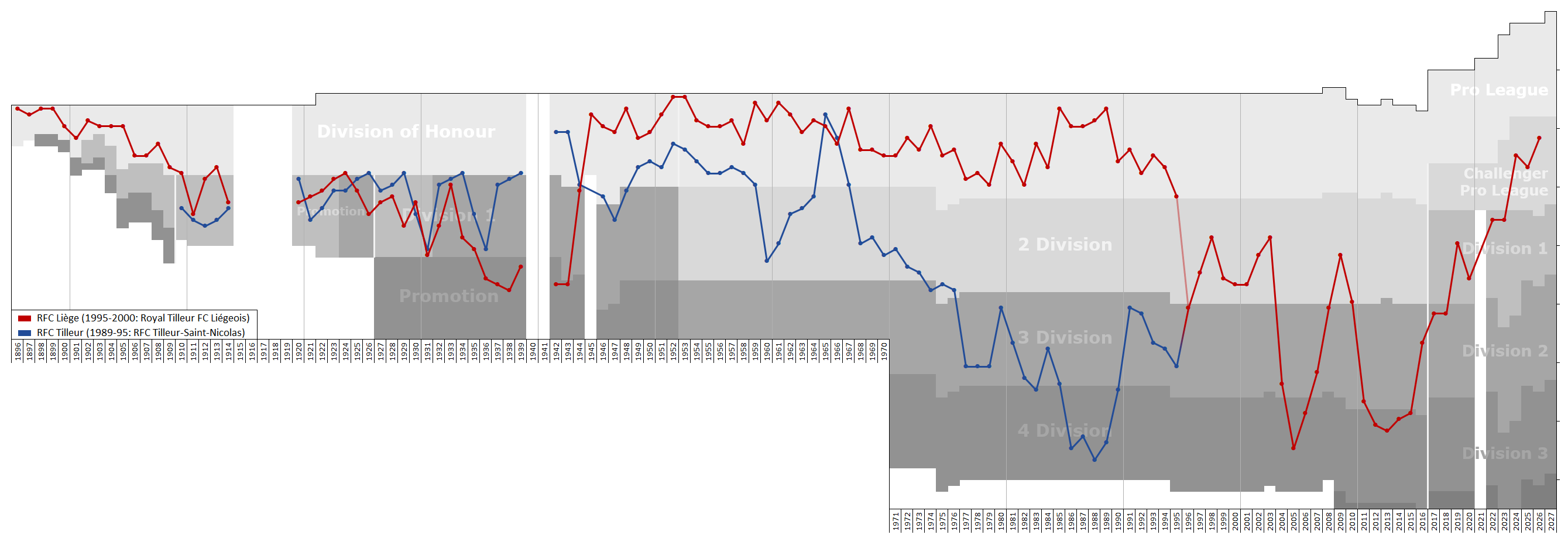
Historical chart of RFC Tilleur league performance (in blue)

The club was an inaugural (1909) participant in the Belgian Second Division, winning the league championship in 1920 without qualifying for the first division. In 1925 the name changed to R. Tilleur F.C. (the "R." standing for Royal, in French as in English) and the club won the second division again, this time qualifying for the top division. Tilleur only won three games in 1926–27 and finished last with 8 points, and was relegated back to the second division. The club earned promotion to the first division for 1928–29, but finished last with 9 points, again being relegated. The club were promoted to the first division for the 1933–34 season, for the third time in seven seasons, but finished last and were relegated for the third time in seven seasons.

Tilleur later had three extended spells in the first division: 1942–46 (interrupted by World War II in 1945), 1949–59 and 1964–67. The best position it reached in the first division was a 4th place in 1965. In 1989 the club merged with R. Saint-Nicolas F.C. de Liège to become R.F.C. Tilleur-Saint-Nicolas, continuing under the matricule n°21. In 1995, the matricule n°21, along with its previous records, ended when the club merged with the elder (founded 1892) R.F.C. Liégeois to become R. Tilleur F.C. de Liège.

== Honours ==
- Belgian Second Division:
  - Winners (5): 1919–20, 1924–25, 1932–33, 1938–39, 1947–48
  - Runners-up (2): 1927–28, 1963–64
