= Berchem Sport =

Belgian football club

- Full name: Koninklijk Berchem Sport
- Nicknames: Geel-zwart, Rooiploeg, Leeuwen
- Founded: 13 August 1906; 119 years ago (creation athletic club); 22 April 1908; 118 years ago (creation football club); 1908; 118 years ago (registration)
- Ground: Ludo Coeckstadion, Berchem
- Capacity: 13,607
- Chairman: Lien Rayé
- Manager: Ewen Verheyden
- League: Belgian Division 3
- 2025–26: Belgian Division 2 VV B, 15th of 16 (relegated)
Home colours	Away colours

Berchem Sport is a Belgian association football club based in the district of Berchem in the municipality of Antwerp and currently playing in the Belgian Division 3. It has formerly played in the First Division.

The club was founded in 1906 and became a member of the FA two years later. It received the matricule n°28 in 1926. Five years later, it added the prefix Royal to its name, then changed this prefix to its Dutch counterpart Koninklijk in 1967.

== Honours ==
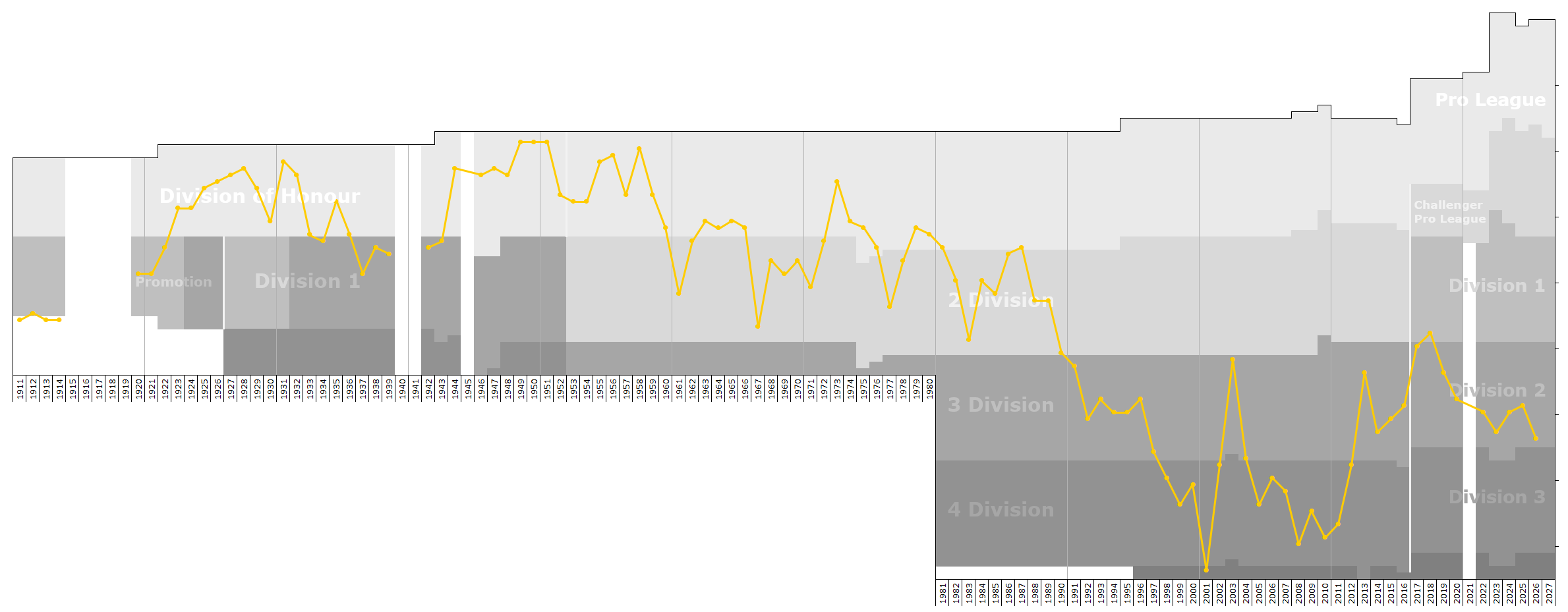
Historical chart of Berchem Sport league performance

- Belgian Pro League:
  - Runners-up (3): 1948–49, 1949–50, 1950–51
- Belgian Second Division:
  - Winners (5): 1933–34, 1942–43, 1961–62, 1971–72, 1985–86
- Belgian Second Division final round:
  - Winners (1): 1977–78
- Belgian Third Division:
  - Winners (1): 2002–03
- Belgian Fourth Division:
  - Winners (2): 2001–02, 2011–12
- Belgian Provincial league Antwerp:
  - Winners (4): 1909–10, 1910–11, 1912–13, 1913–14
- Belgian Provincial league Antwerp Final Round:
  - Winners (1): 2000–01
- Belgian Cup:
  - Semi-finalists (2): 1953–54, 1970–71
