= Philibert Smellinckx =

Belgian footballer

Personal information
- Date of birth: 17 January 1911
- Place of birth: Saint-Gilles (Belgium)
- Date of death: 8 April 1977 (aged 66)

Youth career
- 1921–1928: R. Union Saint-Gilloise

Senior career*
Years	Team	Apps	(Gls)
1928–1946	R. Union Saint-Gilloise		

International career
1933–1938	Belgium national football team	19	(0)
- * Club domestic league appearances and goals

Philibert Smellinckx was a Belgian footballer born 17 January 1911 in Saint-Gilles, Brussels (Belgium), died 8 April 1977.

== Biography ==
Centre back for Union Saint-Gilloise, in the legendary Union 60 who were unbeaten in the league for 60 matches, between 9 January 1933 (Union-Lierse SK, 2-2) and 10 February 1935 (Daring Bruxelles-Union 2-0). At this time, they were three times Belgian Champions, from 1933 to 1935.

At the same time, he played for Belgium from 1933 to 1938 and played 19 matches for the Diables Rouges, including one match at the Italian World Cup.

== Honours ==
- Belgian international from 1933 to 1938 (19 caps)
- Participation in the 1934 World Cup in Italy (1 match)
- Selected for the 1938 World Cup in France (did not play)
- Champion of Belgium in 1933, 1934 and 1935 with R. Union Saint-Gilloise
- 307 matches and 7 goals in Division 1
