= Jean Claessens =

Belgian footballer (1908–1978)

Personal information
- Date of birth: 18 June 1908
- Place of birth: Anderlecht, Belgium
- Date of death: 19 December 1978 (aged 70)
- Position: Midfielder

Senior career*
Years	Team	Apps	(Gls)
1926–1939	Union Saint-Gilloise		
1945–1946	RAEC Mons		

International career
1932–1936	Belgium	21	
- * Club domestic league appearances and goals

Jean Claessens (18 June 1908 – 19 December 1978) was a Belgian footballer who played as a midfielder.

== Career ==
Claessens played for the invincible Union Saint-Gilloise triple Belgian champions from 1933 to 1935. He was a freekick specialist.

He played 21 matches for Belgium from 1932 to 1936. He played in one game at the 1934 World Cup in Italy.

He finished his career as player-coach at RAEC Mons after the War.

== Honours ==
Union SG

- Belgian First Division: 1932–33, 1933–34, 1934–35
