= Félix Welkenhuysen =

Belgian footballer

- Welkenhuysen with Belgium

Personal information
- Date of birth: 12 December 1908
- Place of birth: Saint-Gilles (Belgium)
- Date of death: 20 April 1980 (aged 71)
- Position: Defender

Senior career*
Years	Team	Apps	(Gls)
1926–1943	R. Union Saint-Gilloise		

International career
1934	Belgium	4	(0)
- * Club domestic league appearances and goals

Félix Welkenhuysen was a Belgian footballer, born 12 December 1908 in Saint-Gilles (Belgium), died 20 April 1980.

== Biography ==
He was a defender for Union Saint-Gilloise in the 1930s. He was part of the Union 60, the name given to the team unbeaten in Division 1 for 60 matches between 9 January 1933 (Union-Lierse SK, 2–2) and 10 February 1935 (Daring Bruxelles-Union 2–0). He was also Champion of Belgium three times, consecutively.

For the most of this era, he was a Belgian international. He played four games for the Diables Rouges in 1934 including one game in the preliminary round of the Italy World Cup against Germany (lost, 5–2).

== Honours ==
- Belgian international in 1934 (4 caps)
- First cap: 20 February 1934, Ireland-Belgium, 4–4 (friendly match)
- Participation in the 1934 World Cup (played 1 match)
- Champion of Belgium in 1933, 1934 and 1935 with R. Union Saint-Gilloise
