= Flor Lambrechts =

Belgian footballer (1910–1990)

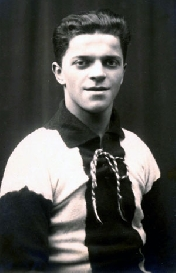

Personal information
- Full name: Florent Jan Maria Lambrechts
- Date of birth: 25 March 1910
- Place of birth: Antwerp, Belgium
- Date of death: 14 April 1990 (aged 80)
- Height: 1.77 m (5 ft 10 in)
- Positions: Forward; midfielder

Senior career*
Years	Team	Apps	(Gls)
1926–1937	Antwerp	196	(143)
1945–1946	La Forestoise	8	(7)
Total		208	(150)
- * Club domestic league appearances and goals

Florent "Flor" Jan Maria Lambrechts (25 March 1910 – 14 April 1990) was a Belgian footballer who played as a forward and midfielder. He played in the First Division for several seasons with Antwerp FC and RCS La Forestoise.

With Antwerp, Lambrechts won the 1929 and 1931 Belgian First Divisions. He also achieved second place with the team in the 1929–30, 1931–32 and 1932–33 seasons. He was the Belgian top scorer of the 1935–36 season, in which he also achieved the record of scoring 7 goals in a single First Division game.

After troubles inside the club, he had to move out of Antwerp to RCS La Forestoise in 1937. In 1941, the club achieved promotion to the Belgian First Division by winning the 1941–42 Belgian Second Division

In total he played 208 games in the Belgian First Division, scoring 150 goals.

== Biography ==
Lambrechts made his debut in 1927 in the Antwerp first team in a friendly match, little more than a month after celebrating his 18th birthday. By the 1929/30 season he had secured a place as a starter. Lambrechts became national champion with Antwerp in 1929 and 1931 and reached second place in 1930, 1932 and 1933.

In the 1935–36 season, Lambrechts was the top scorer of the First Division with 37 goals. In that season, he also scored a record 7 goals in one game in a home match against Berchem Sport.

After a conflict with the dismissed trainer Molnar, Antwerp suspended a number of fundamental players in 1937, including Lambrechts. That year he had to move to the then second division team RCS La Forestoise. Eventually, he continued to play there until 1946. The club was able to achieve promotion to the First Division in 1941. After the championship, which had been interrupted due to the Second World War, was resumed in 1945, he played there one more season. In total he played 208 games in First Division and scored 150 goals.

== Career statistics ==
=== Club ===
Appearances and goals by club, season and competition
Club	Season	League			Cup		Continental		Other		Total	
Club	Season	Division	Apps	Goals	Apps	Goals	Apps	Goals	Apps	Goals	Apps	Goals
Antwerp	1926–27	Belgian First Division	0	0	0	0	0	0	1	0	1	0
Antwerp	1927–28	Belgian First Division	4	0	0	0	0	0	1	0	5	0
Antwerp	1928–29	Belgian First Division	6	1	0	0	0	0	2	0	8	1
Antwerp	1929–30	Belgian First Division	19	7	0	0	0	0	2	1	21	8
Antwerp	1930–31	Belgian First Division	26	18	0	0	0	0	3	2	29	20
Antwerp	1931–32	Belgian First Division	26	21	0	0	0	0	6	1	32	22
Antwerp	1932–33	Belgian First Division	24	16	0	0	0	0	6	7	30	23
Antwerp	1933–34	Belgian First Division	25	18	0	0	0	0	2	3	27	21
Antwerp	1934–35	Belgian First Division	18	16	3	5	0	0	5	4	26	25
Antwerp	1935–36	Belgian First Division	26	37	0	0	0	0	4	0	30	35
Antwerp	1936–37	Belgian First Division	22	11	0	0	0	0	2	0	24	11
Antwerp	Total		196	143	3	5	0	0	34	18	233	166
La Forestoise	1945–46	Belgian First Division	8	7	0	0	0	0	0	0	8	7
Career total			208	150	3	5	0	0	34	18	241	173

== Honours ==
=== Club ===
Antwerp

- Belgian First Division: 1928–29, 1930–31

La Forestoise

- Belgian Second Division: 1941–42

=== Individual ===
- Belgian First Division top scorer: 1935–36 (37 goals)
