= Vital Van Landeghem =

Belgian footballer (1912–1990)

Personal information
- Date of birth: 13 December 1912
- Place of birth: Vilvoorde, Belgium
- Date of death: 15 October 1990 (aged 77)
- Position: Forward

Senior career*
Years	Team	Apps	(Gls)
1929–32	Vilvorde FC		
1932–38	Union Saint-Gilloise	117	(109)
1938–39	RC Tirlemont		
1941–46	Vilvorde FC		

International career
1932	Belgium	1	(1)
- * Club domestic league appearances and goals

Vital Van Landeghem (13 December 1912 – 15 October 1990) was a Belgian footballer who played as a forward. With Union Saint-Gilloise, he became Belgian champion three times in succession. The team also received the national trophy for sporting merit in 1934, the year in which Van Landeghem also became Belgian top scorer. He played in one match for the Belgium national team in 1932.

== Honours ==
Union Saint-Gilloise

- Belgian First Division: 1932–33, 1933–34, 1934–35
- Belgian Sports Merit Award: 1934

Individual

- Belgian First Division top scorer: 1933–34 (29 goals)
