= Jules Pappaert =

Belgian footballer

- Pappaert with Union Saint-Gilloise

Personal information
- Date of birth: 5 November 1905
- Place of birth: Uccle, Belgium
- Date of death: 30 December 1945 (aged 40)
- Place of death: Enghien, Belgium
- Position: Defender

Senior career*
Years	Team	Apps	(Gls)
1923–1928	Union Saint-Gilloise		
1928–1930	Daring Club Bruxelles		
1930–1938	Union Saint-Gilloise		
1938–1941	Enghien Sport		
1941–1942	Fléron		
1942–1945	Enghien Sport		

International career
1932–1934	Belgium	4	(0)
- * Club domestic league appearances and goals

Jules Pappaert (known as Petatje, 5 November 1905 – 30 December 1945) was a Belgian footballer.

== Club career ==
He was a defender and captain of Union Saint-Gilloise in the 1930s. He was Belgian champion three times consecutively from 1933 to 1935. Union were unbeaten for 60 matches. He also played for Daring Club Bruxelles, alomgside his brother Joseph.

== International career ==
He played four matches for the Diables Rouges from 1932 to 1934, but the results were not as good as they had been at club level: 3 defeats, 1 draw, 10 goals scored, 23 goals conceded. Jules Pappaert died of a heart attack on 30 December 1945, in Uccle, Belgium, at the age of 40.

The Jules Pappaert Cup was named after him.

== Honours ==
- Belgian international from 1932 from 1934 (4 caps)
- First cap : 11 December 1932, Belgium-Austria, 1–6 (friendly)
- Participation in the 1934 World Cup (did not play)
- Belgian Champions in 1933, 1934 and 1935 with R. Union Saint-Gilloise
- 176 matches and 16 goals in Division 1
