= André Vandewyer =

Belgian footballer and coach

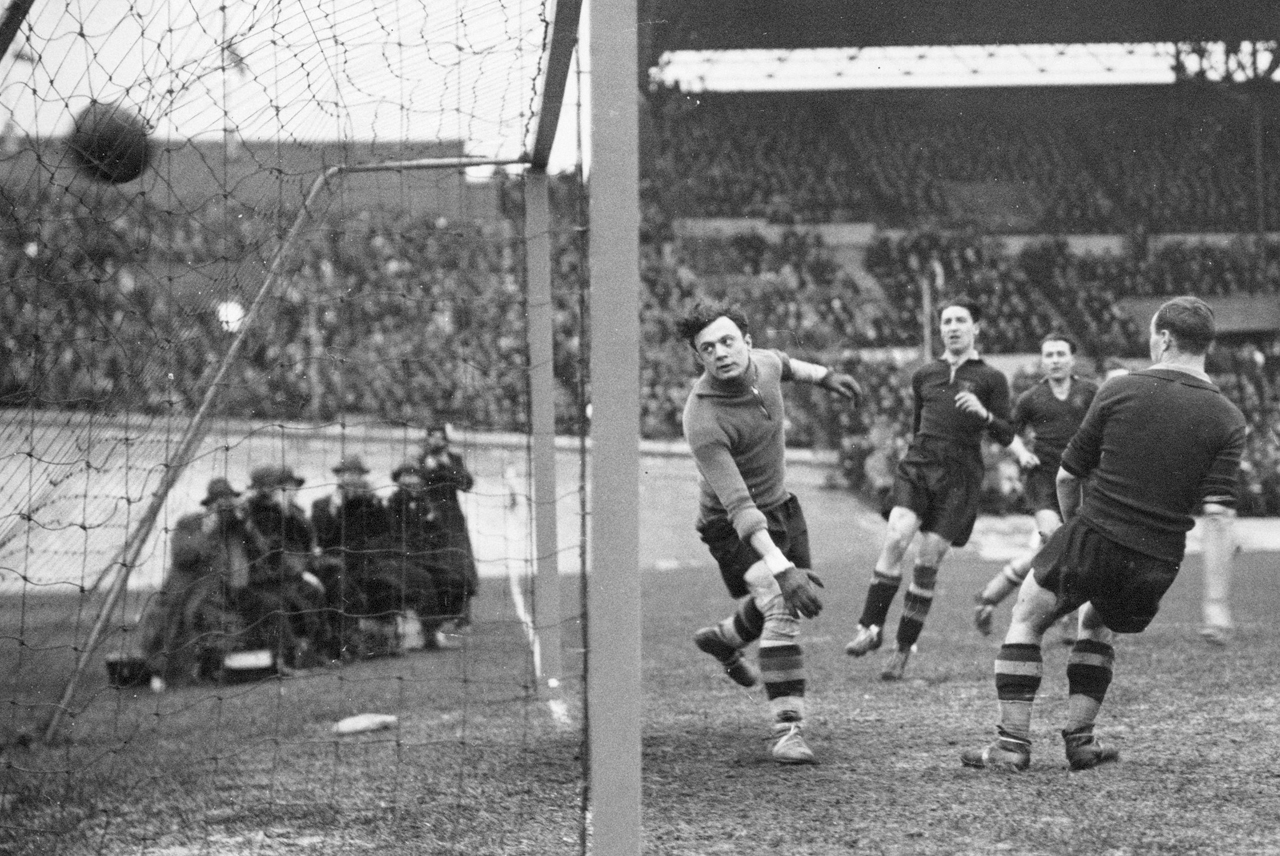
- Goalkeeper Vandewyer with Belgium in 1934

Personal information
- Full name: André Vandewyer
- Date of birth: 21 June 1909
- Place of birth: Tirlemont, Belgium
- Date of death: 22 October 1992 (aged 83)
- Position: Goalkeeper

Youth career
- 1924–1926: RRC Tirlemont

Senior career*
Years	Team	Apps	(Gls)
1926–1931	RRC Tirlemont	117	(0)
1931–1943	R. Union Saint-Gilloise	196	(0)
1943–1945	RFC Hannutois		
1945–1946	RSC Wasmes		

International career
1933–1934	Belgium	5	(0)

Managerial career
- 1947–1959: R. Union Saint-Gilloise
- 1955–1957: Belgium
- * Club domestic league appearances and goals

André Vandewyer was a Belgian footballer and coach born 21 June 1909 in Tirlemont (Belgium), died 22 October 1992 in Tirlemont.

== Biography ==
Vandewyer begins to football in his own town by RRC Tirlemont in 1924 and make his debut in 1926 in second division. After five years he move to Union SG. He was goalkeeper for the legendary Union Saint-Gilloise team: the famous Union 60 were unbeaten in Division 1 for 60 matches, with three consecutive titles in this period, between 9 January 1933 (Union-Lierse SK, 2–2) and 10 February 1935 (Daring Bruxelles-Union 2–0).

He also played for Belgium, five times between 1933 and 1934, including one game at the Italy World Cup.

After the war, he became coach of Union Saint-Gilloise. He was also manager of the Belgian team after Doug Livingstone, from January 1955 until June 1957.

== Honours ==
- Belgian international from 1933 to 1934 (5 caps)
- 1st cap: 26 November 33 Belgium-Denmark 2–2 (friendly)
- Participation in the 1934 Italy World Cup (3 matches)
- Picked for the 1938 France World Cup
- Champion of Belgium in 1933, 1934 and 1935 with R. Union Saint-Gilloise
- 185 matches in Division 1
