= François Vanden Eynde =

Belgian footballer and manager

- François Vanden Eynde

Personal information
- Date of birth: 14 October 1911
- Place of birth: Saint-Gilles, Brussels, Belgium
- Position: Forward

Senior career*
Years	Team	Apps	(Gls)
1930–1947	Union SG	286	(126)
1947–1950	Oudenaarde		
Total		286	(126)

International career
1932–1934	Belgium	4	(2)

Managerial career
- 1964–1965: Union SG
- * Club domestic league appearances and goals

François Vanden Eynde or Van Den Eynde (born 15 February 1911) was a Belgian footballer who played as a forward.

Born in Saint-Gilles, Brussels, he spent his career with his Royale Union Saint-Gilloise from 1930 to 1947. He won the Belgian First Division in 1933, 1934 and 1935, with the team going 60 matches unbeaten. He played 286 matches and scored 126 goals in the Belgian First Division.

Vanden Eynde earned four international caps for Belgium. His debut was on 11 December 1932, in a 6–1 friendly home loss to Austria. His only international goals came on 25 February 1934, when he came on as a 34th-minute substitute for Stanley Vanden Eynde and scored twice in a 4–4 draw against the Irish Free State at Dalymount Park, Dublin, in the 1934 FIFA World Cup qualification.

Vanden Eynde later became the coach of Union SG. In Autumn 1964 he coached the Brussels-based club in their last European appearance before a 58-year long absence, a 1-0 defeat to Italian side Juventus in the 1964–65 Inter-Cities Fairs Cup. He coached Union SG for one season.

== Honours ==
Union SG

- Belgian First Division: 1932–33, 1933–34, 1934–35
