= List of footballers with the most goals in a single game =

This is a list of players with the most goals in a football game. This list only includes players who have scored the most multiple goals in first class or fully professional matches for country or club. Players are listed by number of goals scored in an individual game. Players on equal goals are listed in chronological order. The current world record for an international is held by Archie Thompson, who scored 13 goals against American Samoa in Australia's 31–0 victory during the 2002 FIFA World Cup qualification. David Zdrilic scored 8 goals.

In November 2022, Shokhan Nooraldin Salihi scored 15 goals in the match of Al-Hilal against Sama in the 2022–23 Saudi Women's Premier League. In this match, Al-Hilal beat Sama 18–0. She broke the previous record of Passang Tshering for most goals in any top-flight match with 14 each. In the most prolific European football leagues, the Premier League (and the Football League First Division before it), La Liga, Serie A and the Bundesliga, the top scorers per game have much lower tallies: seven in England and Spain and six in Italy and Germany. The last player in these leagues to score seven goals in a match was László Kubala in 1952 for Barcelona.

== World ==
=== Men ===
Player	Year	Score	Goals	Details
(Germany) Mehmet Kalayci	2026	SV Sodingen II 38–0 Blau Weiß Börnig II	24	Mehmet Kalayci scored 24 goals in the Kreisliga II (11th Tier) On 24 May 2026 breaking Jacek Magdziński.
(Poland) Jacek Magdziński	2021	Wybrzeże Rewalskie Rewal 53–0 LKS Pomorzanin Nowogard	22 (Note: Ömer Temel scored 22 goals in his team Alemania 1890 II’s 25–0 victory over Steglitz GB II in the Kreisliga C 2 Berlin (11th tier) on 26 May 2019. The match was not completed in the second half because the opposing team withdrew to avoid further heavy defeat in the scoreline, but the result was still counted. However, it was not recognized as a record since it occurred between reserve teams.)	Jacek Magdziński scored 22 goals for Wybrzeże Rewalskie Rewal in the Polish Sixth Division on 14 November 2021 breaking Yanick Manzizila record.
(Sweden) Yanick Manzizila	2014	Kongo United FC 30–0 Balrog Botkyrka fc	21	Yanick Djouzi Manzizila scored 21 goals for Kongo United in the ninth tier of the Swedish football on 11 August 2014.
(Ecuador) Ronny Medina	2016	Pelileo SC 44–1 Indi Native	18	
(Mexico) Ramón Arroyo	1995	Tampico-Madero 29–0 Truenos de Acuña	17	Ramón Arroyo scored 17 goals in a Mexican third tier match in the 1994–95 season on 19 February 1995.
(Bhutan) Passang Tshering	2007	Transport United 20–0 RIHS	17	Passang Tshering scored 17 goals in 2007 Bhutan A-Division match on 3 August 2007.
(France) Stefan Dembicki	1942	RC Lens 32–0 Auby Asturies	16	Stefan Dembicki scored 16 goals in a preliminary round Cup match in the 1942–43 French season and held the record exclusively until 1995.
(Cyprus) Panagiotis Pontikos	2007	Olympos Xylofagou 24–3 SEK Agiou Athanasiou	16	Panagiotis Pontikos equalled Stefan Dembicki's record with 16 goals in a match of the 2006–07 Cypriot Third Division on 7 May 2007.
(Algeria) Hacène Lalmas	1962	Ruisseau 18–0 Birtouta	14	Hacène Lalmas scored 14 goals for Ruisseau in the first tier of the Algerian football on 22 October 1962.
(Australia) Archie Thompson	2001	Australia 31–0 American Samoa	13	Archie Thompson scored 13 goals in an international match on 11 April 2001, part of the 2002 FIFA World Cup qualification in the OFC and became the new record holder on an international level.
(Scotland) Jocky Petrie	1885	Arbroath 36–0 Bon Accord	13	18-year-old Jocky Petrie scored 13 goals for Arbroath in the first round of the 1885–86 Scottish Cup and held the record for most goals in a single game for more than half a century.
(French Polynesia) Sandro Tau	2023	Pirae 22–0 Papenoo	13	Sandro Tau scored 13 goals for Pirae in the ninth round of the 2023–24 Tahiti Ligue 1.

=== Women ===
Player	Year	Score	Goals	Details
(Armenia) Ruzanna Khachatryan	2025	West Armenia 0–41 Gandzasar	26	2024-2025 Armenia Women's First League championship - Week 6 - 26 March 2025. -
(Albania) Megi Doci	2025	KFF Vllaznia 23–0 KFF Lushnja	16	Doçi beat her own previous record of 14 goals by scoring 16 goals in the 2024–25 Kategoria Superiore Femra on 16 March 2025.
(Armenia) Nare Hovhannisyan	2026	Ararat Girls 0–36 Noah Girls	16	Armenia Women's First League.
(Iraq) Shokhan Salihi	2022	Al Hilal 18–0 Sama	15	Shokhan Salihi scored 15 goals for Al Hilal in the 2022–23 Saudi Women's Premier League on 19 November 2022.
(Pakistan) Malika-e-Noor	2011	Young Rising Stars 25–0 Margala	14	Malika-e-Noor scored 14 goals in a match of the 2011 Pakistani Cup on 17 September 2011.
(Pakistan) Zulfia Shah	2024	Karachi City 44–0 Jahangir Memorial	14	2024 National Women Football Championship on 21 July 2024.
(Russia) Ekaterina Frolova	2024	Zorka-BDU 28–0 Smorgon	13	Russian 25-year-old player Ekaterina Frolova scored 13 goals for Zorka-BDU in the last game week of the 2024 Belarusian Premier League tournament.
(Argentina) Agustina Almirón	2025	CA Tigre 28–0 Lima FC	12	Agustina Almirón scored 12 goals in a 2025 Campeonato de Fútbol Femenino de Primera División C match.

=== International ===
Competition	Player(s)	For	Against	Goals	Score	Date
Worldwide
FIFA World Cup	Oleg Salenko	Russia	Cameroon	5	6–1	28 June 1994
FIFA World Cup qualification	Archie Thompson	Australia	American Samoa	13	31–0	11 April 2001
FIFA Confederations Cup	Cuauhtémoc Blanco	Mexico	Saudi Arabia	4	5–1	25 July 1999
FIFA Confederations Cup	Marzouk Al-Otaibi	Saudi Arabia	Egypt	4	5–1	29 July 1999
FIFA Confederations Cup	Fernando Torres	Spain	(French Polynesia) Tahiti	4	10–1	20 June 2013
FIFA Confederations Cup	Abel Hernández	Uruguay	(French Polynesia) Tahiti	4	8–0	23 June 2013
Football at the Summer Olympics	Sophus Nielsen	Denmark	France	10	17–1	22 October 1908
Football at the Summer Olympics	Gottfried Fuchs	Germany	Russia	10	16–0	1 July 1912
FIFA Women's World Cup	Michelle Akers-Stahl	United States	Chinese Taipei	5	7–0	24 November 1991
FIFA Women's World Cup	Alex Morgan	United States	Thailand	5	13–0	11 June 2019
Europe
UEFA European Championship	Dieter Müller	West Germany	(Socialist Federal Republic of Yugoslavia) Yugoslavia	3	4–2 (a.e.t.)	17 June 1976
UEFA European Championship	Klaus Allofs	West Germany	Netherlands	3	3–2	14 June 1980
UEFA European Championship	Michel Platini	France	Belgium	3	5–0	16 June 1984
UEFA European Championship	Michel Platini	France	(Socialist Federal Republic of Yugoslavia) Yugoslavia	3	3–2	19 June 1984
UEFA European Championship	Marco van Basten	Netherlands	England	3	3–1	15 June 1988
UEFA European Championship	Sérgio Conceição	Portugal	Germany	3	3–0	20 June 2000
UEFA European Championship	Patrick Kluivert	Netherlands	(Socialist Federal Republic of Yugoslavia) Yugoslavia	3	6–1	25 June 2000
UEFA European Championship	David Villa	Spain	Russia	3	4–1	10 June 2008
UEFA European Championship qualifying	Malcolm Macdonald	England	Cyprus	5	5–0	16 April 1975
UEFA European Championship qualifying	Tibor Nyilasi	Hungary	Luxembourg	5	8–1	19 October 1975
UEFA European Championship qualifying	Marco van Basten	Netherlands	Malta	5	8–0	19 December 1990
South America
Copa América	Héctor Scarone	Uruguay	Bolivia	4	6–0	28 October 1926
Copa América	Juan Marvezzi	Argentina	Ecuador	4	6–1	16 February 1941
Copa América	José Manuel Moreno	Argentina	Ecuador	4	12–0	22 January 1942
Copa América	Evaristo	Brazil	Colombia	4	9–0	24 March 1957
Copa América	Eduardo Vargas	Chile	Mexico	4	7–0	18 June 2016
Africa
Africa Cup of Nations	Laurent Pokou	Ivory Coast	Ethiopia	5	6–1	10 February 1970
Asia
AFC Asian Cup	Behtash Fariba	Iran	Bangladesh	4	7–0	22 September 1980
AFC Asian Cup	Ali Daei	Iran	South Korea	4	6–2	16 December 1996
AFC Asian Cup	Ismail Abdullatif	Bahrain	India	4	5–2	14 January 2011
AFC Asian Cup	Hamza Al-Dardour	Jordan	Palestine	4	5–1	16 January 2015
AFC Asian Cup qualifiers	Abdul Aziz Al-Muqbali	Oman	Bhutan	6	14–0	28 March 2017
North America
CONCACAF Gold Cup	Luís Roberto Alves	Mexico	Martinique	7	9–0	11 July 1993
Oceania
OFC Nations Cup	Jacques Haeko	New Caledonia	Samoa	5	9–0	5 June 2012

=== Clubs ===
Not include goals scored in the qualifying rounds.

Competition	Player(s)	Nation	For	Against	Goals	Score	Date
FIFA
Intercontinental Cup	Pelé	Brazil	(Brazil) Santos	(Portugal) Benfica	3	5–2	11 October 1962
FIFA Club World Cup	Luis Suárez	Uruguay	(Spain) Barcelona	(China) Guangzhou	3	3–0	17 December 2015
FIFA Club World Cup	Cristiano Ronaldo	Portugal	(Spain) Real Madrid	(Japan) Kashima Antlers	3	4–2 (a.e.t.)	18 December 2016
FIFA Club World Cup	Gareth Bale	Wales	(Spain) Real Madrid	(Japan) Kashima Antlers	3	3–1	19 December 2018
FIFA Club World Cup	Hamdou Elhouni	Libya	(Tunisia) ES Tunis	(Qatar) Al-Sadd	3	6–2	17 December 2019
FIFA Club World Cup	Jamal Musiala	Germany	(West Germany) Bayern Munich	(New Zealand) Auckland City	3	10–0	15 June 2025
FIFA Club World Cup	Wessam Abou Ali	Palestine	(Egypt) Al Ahly	(Portugal) Porto	3	4–4	23 June 2025
FIFA Intercontinental Cup	Fiston Mayele	(Democratic Republic of the Congo) DR Congo	(Egypt) Pyramids	(Saudi Arabia) Al-Ahli	3	3–1	23 September 2025
UEFA
UEFA Champions League	Paul Van Himst	Belgium	(Belgium) Anderlecht	(Finland) Haka	5	10–1	14 September 1966
UEFA Champions League	Gerd Müller	West Germany	(West Germany) Bayern Munich	(Cyprus) Omonia	5	9–0	24 October 1972
UEFA Champions League	Claudio Sulser	Switzerland	(Switzerland) Grasshopper	(Malta) Valletta	5	8–0	13 September 1978
UEFA Champions League	Søren Lerby	Denmark	(Netherlands) Ajax	(Cyprus) Omonia	5	10–0	24 October 1979
UEFA Champions League	Lionel Messi	Argentina	(Spain) Barcelona	(Germany) Bayer Leverkusen	5	7–1	7 March 2012
UEFA Champions League	Luiz Adriano	Brazil	(Ukraine) Shakhtar Donetsk	(Belarus) BATE Borisov	5	7–0	21 October 2014
UEFA Champions League	Erling Haaland	Norway	(England) Manchester City	(Germany) RB Leipzig	5	7–0	14 March 2023
UEFA Europa League	Ludwig Bründl	West Germany	(West Germany) BTSV	(Northern Ireland) Glentoran	5	6–1	28 September 1971
UEFA Europa League	Petko Petkov	Bulgaria	(Bulgaria) Beroe	Austria Wien	5	7–0	13 September 1972
UEFA Europa League	Ján Čapkovič	Czechoslovakia	(Czechoslovakia) Slovan Bratislava	(Socialist Federal Republic of Yugoslavia) Vojvodina	5	6–0	13 September 1972
UEFA Europa League	Hannes Löhr	West Germany	(West Germany) Köln	(Norway) Viking	5	9–1	7 November 1972
UEFA Europa League	Kevin Hector	England	(England) Derby County	(Republic of Ireland) Finn Harps	5	12–0	15 September 1976
UEFA Europa League	Marco van Basten	Netherlands	(Netherlands) Ajax	(Luxembourg) Differdange	5	14–0	3 October 1984
UEFA Europa League	Daniel Fonseca	Uruguay	(Italy) Napoli	(Spain) Valencia	5	5–1	16 September 1992
UEFA Europa League	Fabrizio Ravanelli	Italy	(Italy) Juventus	(Bulgaria) CSKA Sofia	5	5–1	27 September 1994
UEFA Europa League	Aritz Aduriz	Spain	(Spain) Athletic Bilbao	(Belgium) Genk	5	5–3	3 November 2016
UEFA Cup Winners' Cup	Mascarenhas	Angola	(Portugal) Sporting CP	(Cyprus) APOEL	6	16–1	13 November 1963
UEFA Cup Winners' Cup	Lothar Emmerich	West Germany	(West Germany) Borussia Dortmund	(Malta) Floriana	6	8–0	10 October 1965
UEFA Cup Winners' Cup	Kiril Milanov	Bulgaria	(Bulgaria) Levski Sofia	(Finland) Reipas Lahti	6	12–2	16 September 1976
UEFA Intertoto Cup	Stéphane Guivarc'h	France	(France) Auxerre	(Cyprus) Nea Salamina	5	10–1	13 July 1997
UEFA Conference League	Harry Kane	England	(England) Tottenham Hotspur	(Slovenia) Mura	3	5–1	30 September 2021
UEFA Conference League	Nicolò Zaniolo	Italy	(Italy) Roma	(Norway) Bodø/Glimt	3	4–0	14 April 2022
UEFA Conference League	Luis Morales	Spain	(Spain) Villarreal	Austria Wien	3	5–0	6 October 2022
UEFA Conference League	Gift Orban	Nigeria	(Belgium) Gent	(Turkey) İstanbul Başakşehir	3	4–1	15 March 2023
UEFA Conference League	Gift Orban	Nigeria	(Belgium) Gent	(Iceland) Breiðablik	3	3–2	9 November 2023
UEFA Conference League	Benjamin Nygren	Sweden	(Denmark) Nordsjælland	(Turkey) Fenerbahçe	3	6–1	30 November 2023
UEFA Conference League	Ayoub El Kaabi	Morocco	(Greece) Olympiacos	(England) Aston Villa	3	4–2	2 May 2024
UEFA Conference League	Marc Guiu	Spain	(England) Chelsea	(Republic of Ireland) Shamrock Rovers	3	5–1	19 December 2024
UEFA Conference League	Franko Kovačević	Croatia	(Slovenia) Celje	(Greece) AEK Athens	3	3–1	2 October 2025
UEFA Super Cup	Terry McDermott	England	(England) Liverpool	(West Germany) Hamburger SV	3	6–0	6 December 1977
UEFA Super Cup	Radamel Falcao	Colombia	(Spain) Atlético Madrid	(England) Chelsea	3	4–1	31 August 2012
UEFA Women's Champions League	Inka Grings	Germany	(Germany) FCR 2001 Duisburg	(Belarus) Universitet Vitebsk	5	6–3	7 October 2009
UEFA Women's Champions League	Cathrine Paaske Sørensen	Denmark	(Denmark) Fortuna Hjørring	(Italy) Bardolino Verona	5	8–0	22 September 2010
CONMEBOL
Copa Libertadores	Juan Carlos Sánchez	Bolivia	(Bolivia) Club Blooming	(Venezuela) Deportivo Italia	6	8–0	7 April 1985
Copa Libertadores	Fernando Baiano	Brazil	(Brazil) Corinthians	(Paraguay) Cerro Porteño	6	8–2	10 March 1999
Copa Libertadores	Julián Álvarez	Argentina	(Argentina) River Plate	(Peru) Alianza Lima	6	8–1	25 May 2022
Copa Libertadores Femenina	Noelia Cuevas	Paraguay	(Paraguay) Universidad Autónoma de Asunción	(Peru) UPI	6	9–0	12 October 2010
AFC
AFC Champions League	Kassim Koné	Ivory Coast	(Thailand) Krung Thai Bank	(Vietnam) Nam Dinh	4	9–1	9 April 2008
AFC Champions League	Nantawat Tansopa	Thailand	(Thailand) Krung Thai Bank	(China) Beijing Guoan	4	5–3	21 May 2008
AFC Champions League	Lee Dong-gook	South Korea	(South Korea) Jeonbuk Hyundai Motors	(Japan) Cerezo Osaka	4	6–1	27 September 2011
AFC Champions League	Ricardo Oliveira	Brazil	(United Arab Emirates) Al Jazira	(Qatar) Al-Rayyan	4	4–3	16 May 2012
AFC Champions League	Yoo Byung-soo	South Korea	(Saudi Arabia) Al Hilal	(United Arab Emirates) Baniyas	4	7–1	23 May 2012
AFC Champions League	Adriano	Brazil	(South Korea) Seoul	(Thailand) Buriram United	4	6–0	23 February 2016
AFC Champions League	Ricardo Goulart	Brazil	(China) Guangzhou Evergrande	(South Korea) Jeju United	4	5–3	6 March 2018
AFC Champions League	Leonardo	Brazil	(United Arab Emirates) Al Wahda	(Qatar) Al-Rayyan	4	4–3	22 April 2019
AFC Champions League	Gustavo	Brazil	(South Korea) Jeonbuk Hyundai Motors	(Singapore) Tampines Rovers	4	9–0	1 July 2021
AFC Champions League	Odion Ighalo	Nigeria	(Saudi Arabia) Al Hilal	(Qatar) Al-Duhail	4	7–0	26 February 2023
CAF
CAF Champions League	Godfrey Chitalu	Zambia	(Zambia) Kabwe Warriors	(Lesotho) Majantja	7	9–0	6 February 1972
CONCACAF
CONCACAF Champions Cup	Emanuel Villa	Argentina	(Mexico) Querétaro	(Belize) Verdes	5	8–0	17 September 2015
OFC
OFC Champions League	Sasho Petrovski	Australia	(Australia) Wollongong Wolves	(Tonga) Lotohaʻapai	7	16–0	9 January 2001
OFC Women's Champions League	Marie Kaipu	Papua New Guinea	(Papua New Guinea) Hekari Women's	(American Samoa) PanSa	5	12–0	5 May 2025
OFC Women's Champions League	Zoe Benson	New Zealand	(New Zealand) Auckland United	(French Polynesia) Pirae	5	11–0	8 May 2025

== Domestic ==
=== Albania ===
The most successful scorers per game in an Kategoria Superiore match:

Player	Goals	For	Against	Result	Competition	Date	Notes	Ref
Refik Resmja	7	Partizani Tirana	Puna Berat	14–0	Kategoria Superiore	31 January 1951		
Refik Resmja	7	Partizani Tirana	Puna Fier	11–0	Kategoria Superiore	25 February 1951		
Refik Resmja	7	Partizani Tirana	Puna Qyteti Stalin	9–0	Kategoria Superiore	4 March 1951		

=== Algeria ===
The most successful scorers per game in an Algerian Ligue Professionnelle 1 match:

Player	Goals	For	Against	Result	Competition	Date	Notes	Ref
Hacène Lalmas	14	Ruisseau	Birtouta	18–0	Algerian Championnat National	22 October 1962		

=== American Samoa ===
The most successful scorers per game in an FFAS Senior League match:

Player	Goals	For	Against	Result	Competition	Date	Notes	Ref
Johnica Collins	13	Pago Youth	Tupulaga Fagasa	20–1	FFAS Senior League	19 October 2024		

=== Antigua and Barbuda ===
The most successful scorers per game in an Antigua and Barbuda Premier Division match:

Player	Goals	For	Against	Result	Competition	Date	Notes	Ref
Rakeem Joseph	10	Old Road	Jennings United	14–0	Antigua and Barbuda Premier Division	25 April 2024	Eventually became the league's top goalscorer with 36 goals	
Stefan Smith	6	Old Road	Unknown	Unknown	Antigua and Barbuda Premier Division	Between 2008 and 2019 (Note: Stefan Smith scored 6 goals in one match during his time with Old Road between 2008 and 2019.)	Date, opponent, and scoreline unknown	

=== Argentina ===
The most successful scorers per game in an Argentine Primera División match:

Player	Goals	For	Against	Result	Competition	Date	Notes	Ref
Juan Taverna	7	Banfield	Puerto Comercial	13–1	Argentine Primera División	6 October 1974		

=== Armenia ===
The most successful scorers per game in an Armenian Premier League match:

Player	Goals	For	Against	Result	Competition	Date	Notes	Ref
Vahe Yagmuryan	8	Ararat Yerevan	Akhtamar	18–0	Armenian Premier League	11 June 1992		

=== Australia ===
The most successful scorers per game in a men's national league match:

Player	Goals	For	Against	Result	Competition	Date	Notes	Ref
Pat Brodnik	6	Wollongong Wolves	West Adelaide	7–0	National Soccer League	18 March 1990	Joint NSL record	
Ivan Kelic	6	Melbourne Knights	Wollongong Macedonia	8–1	National Soccer League	24 March 1991	Joint NSL record	
Zlatko Nastevski	5	Marconi Stallions	St George	7–0	National Soccer League	17 November 1989		
Archie Thompson	5	Melbourne Victory	Adelaide United	6–0	A-League	18 February 2007	A-League joint-record	
Jamie Maclaren	5	Melbourne City	Melbourne Victory	7–0	A-League	17 April 2021	A-League joint-record	

The most successful scorers per game in an FFA Cup match:

Player	Goals	For	Against	Result	Competition	Date	Notes	Ref
Bobô	4	Sydney	Shamrock Rovers Darwin	8–0	FFA Cup	2 August 2017		
Matt Sim	4	Central Coast Mariners	Palm Beach	5–0	FFA Cup	14 October 2014		

=== Austria ===
The most successful scorers per game in an Austrian Bundesliga match:

Player	Goals	For	Against	Result	Competition	Date	Notes	Ref
Karl Decker	8	First Vienna	Ostbahn XI	18–0	Austrian football championship	11 November 1945		
Franz Binder	7	Rapid Wien	Wacker Wiener Neustadt	13–1	Gauliga Ostmark (Note: In March 1938, Nazi Germany annexed Austria in what is commonly referred to as the Anschluss, with the Gauliga Ostmark formed as a consequence. Austria and the Austrian football championship thereby ceased to exist until the end of the Second World War. The Gauliga Ostmark and Gauliga Donau-Alpenland titles from 1938 to 1944, excluding the 1944–45 season which was not completed, are recognised as official Austrian football championships by the Austrian Bundesliga.)	12 March 1939		
Hans Krankl	7	Rapid Wien	Grazer AK	11–1	Austrian Bundesliga	22 June 1977		

=== Bangladesh ===
The most successful scorers per game in a domestic championship match:

Player	Goals	For	Against	Result	Competition	Date	Notes	Ref
Paul Nwachukwu	6	Dhaka Mohammedan	Rahmatganj	7–1	2007 B.League	13 April 2007		
Enamul Haque	5	Farashganj	Khulna Abahani	7–0	2008–09 B.League	15 January 2009		
Jahid Hasan Ameli	5	Dhaka Mohammedan	Arambagh KS	7–0	2009–10 Bangladesh League	13 April 2010		
Mithun Chowdhury	5	Sheikh Russel	Uttar Baridhara	7–1	2013–14 Bangladesh Premier League	15 June 2014		
Souleymane Diabate	5	Dhaka Mohammedan	Brothers Union	8–0	2023–24 Bangladesh Premier League	20 April 2024		

=== Belgium ===
The most successful scorers per game in a Belgian First Division match:

Player	Goals	For	Against	Result	Competition	Date	Notes	Ref
Flor Lambrechts	7	Antwerp	Berchem Sport	11–0	Belgian First Division	10 November 1935		
Wesley Sonck	6	Genk	Mechelen	9–0	Belgian First Division	23 November 2002		
Michael Frey	5	Antwerp	Standard Liège	2–5	Belgian First Division	8 August 2021		

=== Bhutan ===
The most successful scorer per game in a Bhutan A-Division / Bhutan Premier League match:

Player	Goals	For	Against	Result	Competition	Date	Notes	Ref
Passang Tshering	17	Bhutan A-Division	Transport United	20–0	RIHS	3 August 2007	Record holder for most goals in one match in all top men's football leagues.	

=== Brazil ===
The most successful scorers per game in a domestic championship match:

Player	Goals	For	Against	Result	Competition	Date	Notes	Ref
Dada Maravilha	10	Sport Recife	Santo Amaro	14–0	Campeonato Pernambucano	7 April 1976		
Tará	10	Náutico	SC Flamengo	21–3	Campeonato Pernambucano	1 July 1945		
Pelé	8	Santos	Botafogo (SP)	11–0	Campeonato Paulista	21 April 1964		
Jorge Mendonça	8	Náutico	Santo Amaro	8–0	Campeonato Pernambucano	11 August 1974		
Edmundo	6	Vasco da Gama	União São João	6–0	Campeonato Brasileiro Série A	11 September 1997	Brazilian top flight record	

=== Brunei ===
The most successful scorers per game in the Brunei Super League:

Player	Goals	For	Against	Result	Competition	Date	Notes	Ref
Willian dos Santos	8	Kasuka	Panchor Murai	19–0	Brunei Super League	25 January 2025		
Hamizan Aziz Sulaiman	8	Indera	Najip	20–1	Brunei Super League	26 January 2013		
Azwan Ali Rahman	7	Indera	Najip	20–1	Brunei Super League	26 January 2013		
Andrey Varankow	7	DPMM	BSRC	13–0	Brunei Super League	11 July 2021		

=== Chile ===
The most successful scorer per game in a Chilean Primera División match:

Player	Goals	For	Against	Result	Competition	Date	Notes	Ref
Luka Tudor	7	Universidad Católica	Deportes Antofagasta	8–3	Campeonato Nacional	21 November 1993		

=== Colombia ===
The most successful scorers per game in a Colombian Categoría Primera A match:

Player	Goals	For	Against	Result	Competition	Date	Notes	Ref
Gyula Zsengellér	6	Deportivo Samarios	Universidad	12–1	Campeonato Profesional	22 July 1951		
Alfredo Castillo	6	Millonarios	Independiente Medellín	7–3	Campeonato Profesional	5 September 1948		
Jaime Gutiérrez	6	Deportes Quindío	Deportivo Samarios	11–1	Campeonato Profesional	9 November 1952		

=== Croatia ===
The most successful scorer per game in a Croatian Football League match:

Player	Goals	For	Against	Result	Competition	Date	Notes	Ref
Marijo Dodik	6	Slaven Belupo	Varteks	7–1	Croatian First Football League	21 October 2000		

=== Czech Republic ===
The most successful scorer per game in a Czech Cup match:

Player	Goals	For	Against	Result	Competition	Date	Notes	Ref
Jan Silný	11	1. SK Prostějov	TJ Řepiště	26–0	MOL Cup	9 August 2023		

=== Denmark ===
The most successful scorers per game in a Danish Superliga match:

Player	Goals	For	Against	Result	Competition	Date	Notes	Ref
Anthon Olsen	8	Boldklubben af 1893	BK Olympia	15–0	Danish championship	26 September 1909		

=== Egypt ===
The most successful scorers per game in an Egyptian Premier League match:

Player	Goals	For	Against	Result	Competition	Date	Notes	Ref
Saleh Selim	7	Al Ahly	Ismaily	8–0	Egyptian Premier League	4 April 1958		

=== England ===
The most successful scorers per game in a Football League match:

Player	Goals	For	Against	Result	Competition	Date	Notes	Ref
Joe Payne	10	Luton Town	Bristol Rovers	12–0	Third Division South	13 April 1936	Football League record	
Robert Bell	9	Tranmere Rovers	Oldham Athletic	13–4	Third Division North	26 December 1935	Football League record	
Ted Drake	7	Arsenal	Aston Villa	7–1	First Division	14 December 1935	English top flight record	
Tommy Briggs	7	Blackburn Rovers	Bristol Rovers	8–3	Second Division	5 February 1955		
Neville Coleman	7	Stoke City	Lincoln City	8–0	Second Division	23 February 1957		

The most successful scorers per game in a Premier League match:

Player	Goals	For	Against	Result	Competition	Date	Notes	Ref
Andy Cole	5	Manchester United	Ipswich Town	9–0	Premier League	March 1995		
Alan Shearer	5	Newcastle United	Sheffield Wednesday	8–0	Premier League	September 1999		
Jermain Defoe	5	Tottenham Hotspur	Wigan Athletic	9–1	Premier League	22 November 2009		
Dimitar Berbatov	5	Manchester United	Blackburn Rovers	7–1	Premier League	27 November 2010		
Sergio Agüero	5	Manchester City	Newcastle United	6–1	Premier League	3 October 2015		

The most successful scorers per game in an FA Cup match:

Player	Goals	For	Against	Result	Competition	Date	Notes	Ref
Ted MacDougall	9	Bournemouth	Margate	11–0	FA Cup	20 November 1971		

=== Estonia ===
The most successful scorers per game in a Meistriliiga match:

Player	Goals	For	Against	Result	Competition	Date	Notes	Ref
Anatoly Novozhilov	10	Tevalte	Sillamäe Kalev	24–0	Meistriliiga	27 September 1993		

=== France ===
The most successful scorers per game in a Ligue 1 match:

Player	Goals	For	Against	Result	Competition	Date	Notes	Ref
André Abegglen	7	FC Sochaux	US Valenciennes-Anzin	12–1	Division 1	25 August 1935		
Jean Nicolas	7	FC Rouen	US Valenciennes-Anzin	9–1	Division 1	11 May 1938		

The most successful scorers per game in a Coupe de France match:

Player	Goals	For	Against	Result	Competition	Date	Notes	Ref
Stefan Dembicki	16	Lens	Auby Asturies	32–0	Coupe de France	11 December 1942		

=== Germany ===
The most successful scorers per game in a Bundesliga match:

Player	Goals	For	Against	Result	Competition	Date	Notes	Ref
Dieter Müller	6	1. FC Köln	Werder Bremen	7–2	Bundesliga	17 August 1977		
Fourteen players with five goals: Karl-Heinz Thielen, Rudolf Brunnenmeier, Franz Brungs, Klaus Scheer, Gerd Müller (4x), Jupp Heynckes, Manfred Burgsmüller, Atli Eðvaldsson, Dieter Hoeneß, Jürgen Klinsmann, Frank Hartmann, Michael Tönnies, Robert Lewandowski, Luka Jović								

The most successful scorers per game in a 2. Bundesliga match:

Player	Goals	For	Against	Result	Competition	Date	Notes	Ref
Ottmar Hitzfeld	6	VfB Stuttgart	Jahn Regensburg	8–0	2. Bundesliga	13 May 1977		
Nine players with five goals: Rolf Kucharski, Volker Graul, Rainer Künkel, Wilfried Klinge, Horst Hrubesch, Otmar Ludwig, Frank Mill, Ronnie Worm, Dieter Gutzler								

The most successful scorers per game in a DDR-Oberliga match:

Player	Goals	For	Against	Result	Competition	Date	Notes	Ref
Joachim Streich	6	Magdeburg	BSG Chemie Böhlen	10–2	DDR-Oberliga	9 June 1979		
Two players with five goals: Hans-Bert Matoul, Damian Halata								

The most successful scorers per game in a German Cup match:

Player	Goals	For	Against	Result	Competition	Date	Notes	Ref
Carsten Jancker	6	Kaiserslautern	Schönberg 95	15–0	DFB-Pokal	21 August 2004		
Seven players with five goals: Gerd Müller, Dieter Müller, Ronnie Worm, Olaf Thon, Paulo Sérgio, Carsten Jancker, Marek Leśniak								

The most successful scorers per game in a Women's Fußball-Bundesliga match:

Player	Goals	For	Against	Result	Competition	Date	Notes	Ref
Heidi Mohr	7	TuS Niederkirchen	SG Praunheim	8–1	Women's Fußball-Bundesliga	3 March 1991		

=== Gibraltar ===
The most successful scorers per game in a Gibraltar Premier Division/Gibraltar National League match:

Player	Goals	For	Against	Result	Competition	Date	Notes	Ref
Pedro Carrion	11	Europa	Britannia XI	16–1	Gibraltar Premier Division	7 May 2016		

=== Hong Kong ===
The most successful scorers per game in a Hong Kong Premier League match:

Player	Goals	For	Against	Result	Competition	Date	Notes	Ref
Manolo Bleda	5	Lee Man	HK U23	10–0	Hong Kong Premier League	15 October 2022		

=== Hungary ===
The most successful scorers per game in a Nemzeti Bajnokság I match:

Player	Goals	For	Against	Result	Competition	Date	Notes	Ref
Jenő Károly	11	MTK Budapest	MAFC Budapest	15–1	Nemzeti Bajnokság I	15 October 1905		
Imre Schlosser	8	Ferencvárosi	III. Kerületi	11–3	Nemzeti Bajnokság I	9 September 1912		

=== India ===
The most successful scorers per game in an Indian Super League match:

Player	Goals	For	Against	Result	Competition	Date	Notes	Ref
Modou Sougou	4	Mumbai City	Kerala Blasters	6–1	Indian Super League	16 December 2018		

=== Indonesia ===
The most successful scorers per game in a Championship (second tier) match:

Player	Goals	For	Against	Result	Competition	Date	Notes	Ref
Adilson Silva	6	Adhyaksa	Sriwijaya	15–0	Liga 2	29 January 2026		

=== Iraq ===
The most successful scorers per game in a Iraq Stars League match:

Player	Goals	For	Against	Result	Competition	Date	Notes	Ref
Shakir Sabbar	6	Al-Ramadi	Kirkuk	11–0	Iraqi National League	15 May 1995		
Sahib Abbas	6	Al-Zawraa	Al-Karkh	6–0	Iraqi Premier League	18 October 1996		
Alaa Kadhim	6	Al-Talaba	Al-Mosul	7–1	Iraqi Premier League	9 January 1998		

=== Italy ===
The most successful scorers per game in a Serie A match:

Player	Goals	For	Against	Result	Competition	Date	Notes	Ref
Silvio Piola	6	Pro Vercelli	Fiorentina	7–2	Serie A	29 October 1933		
Omar Sívori	6	Juventus	Internazionale	9–1	Serie A	10 June 1961		
11 players with five goals: Miroslav Klose (2012–13), Roberto Pruzzo (1985–86), Kurt Hamrin (1963–64), Antonio Valentín Angelillo (1958–59), Carlo Galli (1957–58), Emanuele Del Vecchio (1957–58), Bruno Ispiro (1948–49), István Mike Mayer (1948–49), Giuseppe Meazza (1937–38), Cesare Augusto Fasanelli (1930–31) and Giovanni Vecchina (1929–30)								

=== Jamaica ===
The most successful scorers per game in a National Premier League match:

Player	Goals	For	Against	Result	Competition	Date	Notes	Ref
Devon Hodges	10	Rivoli United	Invaders United	15–0	National Premier League	29 May 2005		

=== Japan ===
The most successful scorers per game in a J League match:

Player	Goals	For	Against	Result	Competition	Date	Notes	Ref
Michael Olunga	8	Kashiwa Reysol	Kyoto Sanga	13–1	J2 League	24 November 2019		
Wagner Lopes	5	Nagoya Grampus Eight	Urawa Red Diamonds	8–1	J.League Division 1	28 May 1999		
Masashi Nakayama	5	Júbilo Iwata	Cerezo Osaka	9–1	J.League	14 April 1998		
Edílson	5	Kashiwa Reysol	Gamba Osaka	7–1	J.League	3 May 1996		
Koji Noguchi	5	Bellmare Hiratsuka	Kashima Antlers	7–0	J.League	2 May 1995		

=== Kuwait ===
The most successful scorers per game in a Kuwait Premier League match:

Player	Goals	For	Against	Result	Competition	Date	Notes	Ref
Patrick Fabiano	8	Al-Salmiya	Al-Tadamon	9–1	Kuwait Premier League	26 December 2020		

=== Maldives ===
The most successful scorers per game in a Dhivehi League match:

Player	Goals	For	Against	Result	Competition	Date	Notes	Ref
Ali Ashfaq	12	VB Sports Club	Kalhaidhoo	20–0	Dhivehi League	2 July 2009		
Ibrahim Shiyam	8	Victory	United Victory	17–1	Dhivehi League	7 July 2004		

=== Moldova ===
The most successful scorers per game in a Moldovan Super Liga match:

Player	Goals	For	Against	Result	Competition	Date	Notes	Ref
Iurie Miterev	9	Zimbru Chișinău	Ciuhur Ocnița	15–1	Moldovan National Division	19 June 1997		

=== Netherlands ===
The most successful scorers per game in an Eredivisie match:

Player	Goals	For	Against	Result	Competition	Date	Notes	Ref
Henk Schouten	9	Feijenoord	Volewijckerskers	11–4	Netherlands Football League Championship	2 April 1956		
Jaap Bulder	8	Be Quick 1887	Veendam	14–0	Netherlands Football League Championship	1920		
Jaap Bulder	8	Be Quick 1887	MVV Alcides	10–0	Netherlands Football League Championship	1922		
Afonso Alves	7	Heerenveen	Heracles Almelo	9–0	Eredivisie	7 October 2007		

The most successful scorers per game in an Eerste Divisie match:

Player	Goals	For	Against	Result	Competition	Date	Notes	Ref
Johan Voskamp	8	Sparta Rotterdam	Almere City	12–1	Eerste Divisie	20 August 2010		

=== Norway ===
The most successful scorers per game in a Tippeligaen match:

Player	Goals	For	Against	Result	Competition	Date	Notes	Ref
Odd Iversen	6	Rosenborg	Vålerenga	7–2	Tippeligaen	1968		
Jan Fuglset	6	Molde	Strømsgodset	6–0	Tippeligaen	1976		

=== Pakistan ===
The most successful scorers per game in a Pakistani women's football championship match:

Player	Goals	For	Against	Result	Competition	Date	Notes	Ref
Malika-e-Noor	14	Young Rising Stars	Margala	25–0	Pakistani women's football championship	September 2011		

=== Poland ===
The most successful scorers per game in a Ekstraklasa match:

Player	Goals	For	Against	Result	Competition	Date	Notes	Ref
Ernest Wilimowski	10	Ruch Chorzów	Union Touring Łódź	12–1	Ekstraklasa	21 May 1939		

=== Portugal ===
The most successful scorers per game in a Primeira Liga match:

Player	Goals	For	Against	Result	Competition	Date	Notes	Ref
Fernando Peyroteo	9	Sporting CP	Leça	14–0	Primeira Divisão	22 February 1942		
Fernando Peyroteo	8	Sporting CP	Boavista	12–1	Primeira Divisão	17 October 1948		

=== Qatar ===
The most successful scorers per game in a Qatar Stars League match:

Player	Goals	For	Against	Result	Competition	Date	Notes	Ref
Baghdad Bounedjah	7	Al-Sadd	Al-Arabi	10–1	Qatar Stars League	12 August 2018		

=== Romania ===
The most successful scorers per game in a Liga I match:

Player	Goals	For	Against	Result	Competition	Date	Notes	Ref
László Raffinsky	10	Juventus București	Dacia Unirea Brăila	16–0	Liga I	18 May 1930		
Árpád Thierjung	6	Chinezul Timișoara	CA Oradea	7–3	Liga I	19 September 1937		
Ion Ciosescu	6	Știința Timișoara	Dinamo Orașul Stalin	8–0	Liga I	30 November 1955		
Gheorghe Hagi	6	Sportul Studențesc	FC Olt	7–5	Liga I	18 June 1986		
Claudiu Vaișcovici	6	Dinamo București	CSM Suceava	9–1	Liga I	8 May 1988		
Marian Popa	6	Farul Constanța	Oțelul Galați	6–3	Liga I	9 June 1993		
Claudiu Keșerü	6	FCSB	CS Pandurii Târgu Jiu	6–0	Liga I	15 August 2014		

The most successful scorers per game in a Liga I Feminin match:

Player	Goals	For	Against	Result	Competition	Date	Notes	Ref
Cosmina Duşa	13	CFF Olimpia Cluj	CFF Clujana	13–2	Liga I Feminin	31 October 2010		
Cosmina Duşa	8	CFF Olimpia Cluj	Fair Play Bucuresti	27–0	Liga I Feminin	8 May 2011	Only played last 30 minutes	

=== Saudi Arabia ===
The most successful scorers per game in a Saudi Pro League match:

Player	Goals	For	Against	Result	Competition	Date	Notes	Ref
Sami Al-Jaber	6	Al Hilal	Al Raed	8–0	Saudi Premier League	22 March 1990		
Hamzah Idris	6	Al-Ittihad	Al Wehda	8–0	Saudi Premier League	27 March 2000		

The most successful scorers per game in a Saudi Women's Premier League match:

Player	Goals	For	Against	Result	Competition	Date	Notes	Ref
Shokhan Salihi	15	Al Hilal	Sama	18–0	Saudi Women's Premier League	11 November 2022	Record holder for most goals in one match in all top women's football leagues.	

=== Scotland ===
The most successful scorers per game in a top flight match:

Player	Goals	For	Against	Result	Competition	Date	Notes	Ref
Jimmy McGrory	8	Celtic	Dunfermline	9–0	Division One	14 January 1928		

The most successful scorers per game in a Scottish Premier League match:

Player	Goals	For	Against	Result	Competition	Date	Notes	Ref
Kenny Miller	5	Rangers	St Mirren	7–1	Scottish Premier League	4 November 2000		
Kris Boyd	5	Kilmarnock	Dundee United	5–2	Scottish Premier League	25 September 2004		
Kris Boyd	5	Rangers	Dundee United	7–1	Scottish Premier League	30 December 2009		
Gary Hooper	5	Celtic	Hearts	5–0	Scottish Premier League	13 May 2012		

The most successful scorers per game in a Scottish Cup match:

Player	Goals	For	Against	Result	Competition	Date	Notes	Ref
John Petrie	13	Arbroath	Bon Accord	36–0	Scottish Cup	12 September 1885		

The most successful scorers per game in a Scottish Women's Cup match:

Player	Goals	For	Against	Result	Competition	Date	Notes	Ref
Debbie McWhinnie	12	Glasgow City	Motherwell	28–0	Scottish Women's Cup	15 February 2004		

The most successful scorers per game in a Scottish Women's Premier League match:

Player	Goals	For	Against	Result	Competition	Date	Notes	Ref
Debbie McWhinnie	10	Hibernian	East Kilbride	17–0	Scottish Women's Premier League	29 August 2004		
Ruesha Littlejohn	7	Glasgow City	Inverness	11–0	Scottish Women's Premier League	7 November 2010		

=== Singapore ===
The most successful scorers per game in a Singapore Premier League match:

Player	Goals	For	Against	Result	Competition	Date	Notes	Ref
Tsubasa Sano	5	Albirex Niigata (S)	Young Lions	8–0	S.League	26 May 2017		
Andrey Varankow	5	DPMM	Balestier Khalsa	7–1	Singapore Premier League	13 April 2019		
Reo Nishiguchi	5	Tanjong Pagar United	Young Lions	8–1	Singapore Premier League	10 January 2022		

=== Spain ===
The most successful scorers per game in a La Liga match:

Player	Goals	For	Against	Result	Competition	Date	Ref
Agustín Sauto Arana	7	Athletic Bilbao	Barcelona	12–1	La Liga	8 February 1931	
László Kubala	7	Barcelona	Sporting Gijón	9–0	La Liga	10 February 1952	
César	6	Granada	Castellón	7–3	La Liga	22 March 1942	
Edmundo Suárez	6	Valencia	Real Betis	8–3	La Liga	28 February 1943	
Telmo Zarra	6	Athletic Bilbao	Lleida	10–0	La Liga	19 November 1950	

The most successful scorers per game in a Copa del Rey match:

Player	Goals	For	Against	Result	Competition	Date	Notes	Ref
Agustín Gaínza	8	Athletic Bilbao	Celta Vigo	12–1	Copa del Rey	18 May 1947		

=== Syria ===
The most successful scorers per game in a Syrian Premier League match:

Player	Goals	For	Against	Result	Competition	Date	Notes	Ref
Haytham Kajjo	10	Al-Jihad	Mayadin	12–0	Syrian Premier League	18 June 1998		

=== Tahiti ===
The most successful scorers per game in a Tahiti Ligue 1 match:

Player	Goals	For	Against	Result	Competition	Date	Notes	Ref
Sandro Tau	13	Pirae	Papenoo	22–0	Tahiti Ligue 1	11 December 2023		

=== Trinidad and Tobago ===
The most successful scorers per game in a TT Premier Football League match:

Player	Goals	For	Against	Result	Competition	Date	Notes	Ref
Titus Elva	9	W Connection	Tobago United	17–0	TT Premier Football League	13 October 2004		

=== United Arab Emirates ===
The most goals scored per game in a UAE Pro League match:

Player	Goals	For	Against	Result	Competition	Date	Notes	Ref
Sebastián Tagliabúe	5	Al Wahda	Sharjah	7–1	UAE Pro League	2 November 2016		

=== United States ===
The most goals scored per game in a Major League Soccer match:

Player	Goals	For	Against	Result	Competition	Date	Notes	Ref
Clint Mathis	5	MetroStars	Dallas Burn	6–4	Major League Soccer	25 August 2000		

The most goals scored per game in a NWSL match:

Player	Goals	For	Against	Result	Competition	Date	Notes	Ref
Sam Kerr	4	Sky Blue FC	Seattle Reign	5–4	NWSL	19 August 2017		
Kristen Hamilton	4	North Carolina Courage	Houston Dash	5–2	NWSL	5 July 2019		

=== Uruguay ===
The most successful scorer per game in a Uruguayan Primera División match:

Player	Goals	For	Against	Result	Competition	Date	Notes	Ref
Fernando Morena	7	Peñarol	Huracan Buceo	7–0	Campeonato Uruguayo	17 July 1978		

=== Vietnam ===
The most successful scorer per game in a V.League 1 match:

Player	Goals	For	Against	Result	Competition	Date	Notes	Ref
Nguyen Dinh Viet	5	Hoàng Anh Gia Lai	Hòa Phát Hà Nội	6–1	V.League 1	23 September 2007		
Rafaelson	5	Thép Xanh Nam Định	Đông Á Thanh Hóa	5–2	V.League 1	26 May 2024		

=== Wales ===
The most successful scorer per game in a Cymru Premier match:

Player	Goals	For	Against	Result	Competition	Date	Notes	Ref
Rhys Griffiths	7	Port Talbot Town	Afan Lido	8–2	Cymru Premier	14 March 2014		

== See also ==
- List of world association football records
