= Piedfort (surname) =

Piedfort is a Belgian surname. Notable people with the surname include:

- Arthur Piedfort (born 2005), Belgian footballer
- Jef Piedfort (1930-2008), Belgian footballer
