= 1935–36 Belgian First Division =

36th season of top-tier football in Belgium

Belgian First Division
- Season: 1935–36

Statistics of Belgian First Division in the 1935–36 season.

== Overview ==
Location of teams in Belgian First Division 1935–36

It was contested by 14 teams, and Daring Club won the championship.

== League standings ==
Pos	Team	Pld	W	D	L	GF	GA	GD	Pts	Relegation
1	Daring Club	26	15	7	4	62	37	+25	37	
2	Standard Liège	26	16	2	8	67	39	+28	34	
3	Royale Union Saint-Gilloise	26	14	4	8	64	37	+27	32	
4	Royal Antwerp FC	26	15	2	9	99	55	+44	32	
5	Lierse S.K.	26	14	3	9	47	37	+10	31	
6	KV Mechelen	26	12	6	8	56	55	+1	30	
7	Beerschot	26	13	3	10	57	46	+11	29	
8	R.S.C. Anderlecht	26	11	5	10	58	51	+7	27	
9	Club Brugge K.V.	26	8	7	11	44	50	−6	23	
10	K. Lyra	26	8	5	13	52	73	−21	21	
11	White Star	26	8	5	13	47	69	−22	21	
12	K.R.C. Mechelen	26	7	6	13	53	66	−13	20	
13	Cercle Brugge K.S.V.	26	7	5	14	34	53	−19	19	Relegated to Division I
14	K Berchem Sport	26	2	4	20	32	104	−72	8	Relegated to Division I

== Results ==
Home \ Away	AND	ANT	BEE	BRC	CER	CLU	DAR	LIE	LYR	KVM	RCM	STA	USG	WST
Anderlecht		2–3	4–1	5–0	3–1	2–1	1–4	2–3	6–4	2–2	5–2	0–5	0–3	1–3
Antwerp	1–4		2–0	11–0	6–1	6–1	5–3	1–2	6–3	2–3	3–3	3–1	7–1	1–2
Beerschot	2–2	1–3		2–1	1–0	6–0	1–1	1–0	2–0	3–1	2–0	1–6	2–0	5–0
Berchem	0–1	2–12	0–8		0–2	0–3	1–2	1–2	4–3	3–5	2–2	2–3	3–3	1–5
Cercle Brugge	3–2	1–3	2–1	4–0		0–0	1–6	1–2	2–0	1–1	3–1	1–1	1–1	1–3
Club Brugge	1–1	1–1	2–3	5–1	2–1		3–4	1–1	4–1	2–4	2–2	1–2	1–0	3–0
Daring Club	3–0	4–3	0–2	0–0	3–0	1–0		1–1	3–2	2–2	3–1	1–2	4–1	3–0
Lierse	4–3	1–2	4–1	4–0	1–2	2–3	2–2		1–3	2–0	4–0	3–1	1–0	1–0
Lyra	2–2	3–2	2–2	0–5	1–0	2–2	2–2	1–0		3–0	3–0	2–6	3–1	6–1
KV Mechelen	0–4	4–3	2–1	8–2	5–1	1–1	1–4	3–0	3–1		1–0	0–0	3–0	4–3
K.R.C. Mechelen	0–3	5–7	0–4	4–0	3–1	4–1	4–2	0–2	5–1	2–2		7–2	1–1	4–4
Standard Liège	1–2	1–0	4–2	5–1	2–0	2–0	0–1	0–3	3–1	5–0	5–1		0–1	2–1
Union SG	1–0	4–2	6–1	2–0	2–2	2–1	1–2	5–0	9–1	5–0	3–0	4–1		3–0
White Star	1–1	2–4	4–2	3–3	3–2	1–3	1–1	3–1	2–2	3–1	0–2	1–7	1–5	

Legend: Blue = home team win; Yellow = draw; Red = away team win.
