= Raymond Van Gestel =

Belgian footballer (1930–2020)

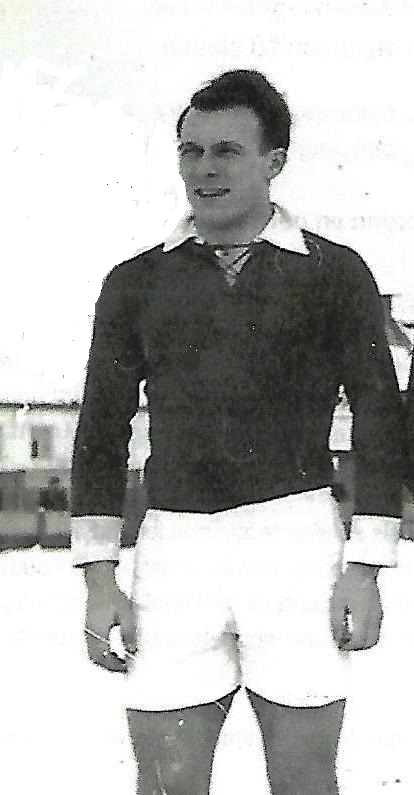
- Van Gestel in 1953.

Personal information
- Date of birth: 20 January 1930
- Place of birth: Mol, Belgium
- Date of death: 17 April 2020 (aged 90)
- Place of death: Mol, Belgium
- Position: Right winger

Senior career*
Years	Team	Apps	(Gls)
1946–1948	SV Mol		
1948–1958	Lyra	168	(92)
1958–1962	Verbroedering Geel		
Total		168+	(92+)

International career
1951–1953	Belgium	5	(2)
- * Club domestic league appearances and goals

Raymond Van Gestel (20 January 1930 – 17 April 2020) was a Belgian footballer, athlete and pilot. He spent most of his career with Lyra.

== Club career ==
Born in Mol, Van Gestel played as a right winger for SV Mol, Lyra and Verbroedering Geel. In total he played 57 games in the first division scoring a total of 32 goals.

In 1954, when Lyra were promoted to the First Division, he suffered a severe knee injury, largely ending his career. In total he played 168 league games for Lyra, scoring 92 goals.

== International career ==
During his career he also earned 5 caps for the Belgium national team between 1951 and 1953, scoring 2 goals. Both goals came against Spain on 10 June 1951; the first goal was scored after only 17 seconds in the game, giving him the then-record of the fastest goal scored for the national team. Following the game against Spain he was nicknamed Raimundo el rapido and he was close to a transfer to Spanish club Espanyol, but Lyra refused the deal.

In 1954 he was selected for the Belgian squad for the World Cup in Zürich, but he could not join the team due to a military mission in Africa as a fighter pilot with the Belgian air force.

== Athletics career ==
He was also active as an athlete in the long jump and sprints. He was the Belgian long jump champion. Due to his versatility he is one of the few Belgian athletes ever to compete in different sports at an international level in the same year.

== Later life and death ==
Van Gestel was a Fighter pilot for the Belgian air force and flight instructor. As an instructor he trained around 2000 students. Together with his brother he was also one of the founding members of the Belgian Flying club Keiheuvel.

He died in Mol on 17 April 2020, aged 90.
