= Gustave Vanderstappen =

Belgian footballer

- Vanderstappen in 1908

Personal information
- Full name: Louis Gustave Vanderstappen
- Date of birth: 11 January 1882
- Place of birth: Saint-Gilles, Belgium
- Date of death: September 22, 1955 (aged 73)

Senior career*
Years	Team	Apps	(Gls)
1897–1910	Union Saint-Gilloise		

International career
1905–1908	Belgium	4	(0)
- * Club domestic league appearances and goals

Gustave Vanderstappen (11 January 1882 – 22 September 1955) was a Belgian footballer. As Union Saint-Gilloise player, Vanderstappen became twice topscorer in the Belgian First Division. He played in four matches for the Belgium national football team from 1905 to 1908.

== Honours ==
=== Club ===
==== Union Saint-Gilloise ====
- Belgian First Division champions: 1903–04, 1904-05, 1905-06, 1906-07, 1908-09, 1909-10; runners-up: 1902-03, 1907-08
- Belgian Second Division champions: 1900-01

=== Individual ===
- Belgian First Division top scorer: 1902–03, 1903–04
