= Ramón Arroyo (footballer) =

Mexican footballer

Personal information
- Full name: Ramón Arroyo Sánchez
- Place of birth: Mexico
- Position: Forward

Senior career*
Years	Team	Apps	(Gls)
1994–1995	C.D.S. Tampico Madero		(42)
- Querétaro
- Correcaminos
- * Club domestic league appearances and goals

Ramón Arroyo Sánchez was a Mexican footballer who played as a forward. He is best known for scoring 17 goals in a Mexican third tier match in the 1994–95 season to help his side C.D.S. Tampico Madero to a resounding 29–0 victory over Truenos de Ciudad Acuña at the Estadio Tamaulipas.

== Playing career ==
On 19 February 1995, Arroyo scored 17 goals in a Mexican third-tier match. He netted his first goal when the duel was already 4–0 and ended the first half with seven; although Acuña no longer wanted to go out to play in the second half as they were already 0–14 down, they still came onto the field again, and then he scored the remaining 10 goals. He finished with 42 goals on the season, but was nevertheless overtaken for the league scoring title by José Luis “Charro” Mendoza, who scored eight goals in the season finale to reach a total of 44.

We knew about the opponent who was going badly, I never imagined that this would happen, only in dreams, but Professor Franco Zúñiga always trained us in the midfield with pure shots on goal for the same reason; he decreed that we were going to score 30 goals, we never believed him, But look, it happened and thank God there were 29 goals, of which I scored 17.

— Ramón Arroyo.

His 17-goal haul catapulted his career as he caught the attention of bigger teams and was signed by Querétaro F.C. in the Primera División. He was unable to hold down a place, however, and was never able to debut in the top circuit, instead joining second-tier side Correcaminos. He then had to retire to support his family and take care of his father who was in poor health.

According to the International Federation of Football History & Statistics (IFFHS), the most goals scored by a player in a First Division match belongs to Stefan Dembicki of Racing Club de Lens, who scored 16 goals against Auby-Asturies in the 1942–43 Coupe de France. Although not in the First Division, Arroyo broke this 52-year-old record for most goals scored in a single match and then held the record himself for nearly 20 years when it was finally broken by Yanick Manzizila, who scored 21 goals in the ninth tier of Swedish football on 11 August 2014.

== See also ==
- List of footballers who achieved hat-trick records
