= Jef Piedfort =

Belgian footballer

Jozef Piedfort
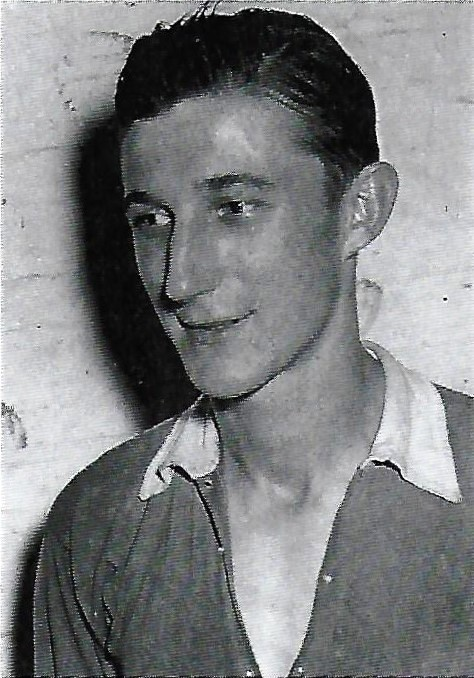
- Piedfort in 1951

Personal information
- Date of birth: 20 May 1930
- Place of birth: Gierle, Belgium
- Date of death: 26 March 2008 (aged 77)
- Place of death: Leuven, Belgium
- Position: Forward

Senior career*
Years	Team	Apps	(Gls)
1946–1950	VC Gierle		
1950–1951	FC Turnhout		
1951–1961	K. Lyra		
1961–1962	FC Turnhout		
Total		280+	(180+)

International career
1953	Belgium	1	(0)
- * Club domestic league appearances and goals

Jozef Piedfort (20 May 1930 – 26 March 2008) was a Belgian football player. He scored the most goals (184) in the Belgian Second Division after World War II. In the first division he scored 8 goals in 29 games. He was the most successful striker for K. Lyra, a team from Lier, Belgium.
