= Stefan Dembicki =

French footballer (1913–1985)

Personal information
- Date of birth: 15 July 1913
- Place of birth: Dortmund, Germany
- Date of death: 23 September 1985 (aged 72)
- Position: Forward

Senior career*
Years	Team	Apps	(Gls)
1936–1949	Lens	250+	(175+)
- * Club domestic league appearances and goals

Stefan Dembicki (15 July 1913 – 23 September 1985) was a French footballer who played for Lens as a forward.

He is most notable for holding the record for most goals scored in a single high-level match in France, having netted 16 times in his team's 32–0 win over Auby-Asturies in the 1942–43 Coupe de France.

== Early life ==
Dembicki was born on 15 July 1913 in the Marten district of Dortmund, Germany to Polish parents. His father, a miner, moved the family to the Pas-de-Calais region of France whilst Dembicki was still young, and as he grew older, he too began working in the mines. He acquired French nationality by naturalization on 24 August 1936, whilst living in Harnes.

== Career ==
=== Before Lens ===
In the early 1930s, Dembicki began playing football locally, and played for both AS Sallaumines, and local Polish community side Kurjer.

=== Lens ===
Dembicki started playing for Lens' first team in 1936, with the club in the second division of French football at the time, and won promotion with the side to the first division in his first season with the side, scoring prolifically in the process.

Dembicki was captured in 1940 by the German army, and was a prisoner of war until 1942, when his employer, who ran the coal mines in the Nord-Pas de Calais basin, bought his freedom, along with the freedom of many other workers, in the name of war efforts.

It is during this wartime period that Dembicki achieved his best performance, scoring a number of goals that remains uncertain, and winning two North Division French championships, in 1942–43 with Lens, and in 1943–44 with Vichy-created side Lens-Artois. His most important achievement is scoring 16 goals in a single Coupe de France match, namely in a round of 16 fixture against Douai-based amateur side Auby-Asturies in December 1942, which Lens won 32–0. This remains the highest number of goals scored by a single player in a high-level French football match.

After liberation, Dembicki continued playing for Lens and working as a miner. His side performed well in 1945–46, but were relegated the following season. He remained with the club in the second division, and was an integral part of Lens' run to the final of the Coupe de France in 1948, scoring a hat-trick in the semi-final against SR Colmar and scoring twice in the final against Lille to level the score, though he ultimately was unable to stop his side losing 3–2. He left the club the following season, at 36 years old and suffering from injuries, but fortunately having helped Lens win promotion back to the first division.

== Style of play ==
Dembicki was a fast and agile forward.

== Post-playing career ==
Following his retirement from professional football, Dembicki continued working as an electrician in the mines of the Nord-Pas de Calais basin, whilst also playing amateur football for RC Arras.

Dembicki died on the 23 September 1985 at the age of 72.

== Honours ==
Lens

- Division 2: 1936–37, 1948–49
- French Northern Zone: 1942–43

Lens-Artois

- French Northern Zone: 1943–44

Individual

- So Foot Top 1000 Best Players of the French First Division: 217th
