= K Lyra =

Belgian football club

Lyra
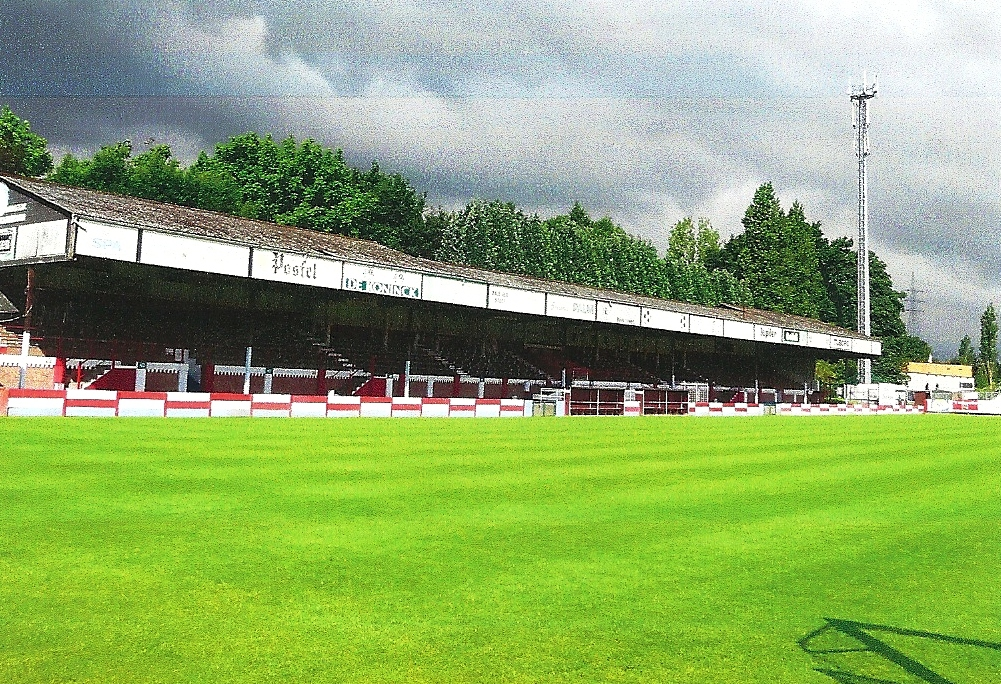
- Full name: Koninklijke Lyra
- Founded: 17 January 1909; 117 years ago
- Dissolved: 11 April 1972; 54 years ago
- Ground: Lyra stadium
- Capacity: 6000
- Website: https://lyralierse.be/
| Home colours | Away colours |

Koninklijke Lyra was a Belgian football club that existed between 1909 and 1972. It was located in the city of Lier in the province of Antwerp. Lyra is the Latin name for Lier.

== History ==
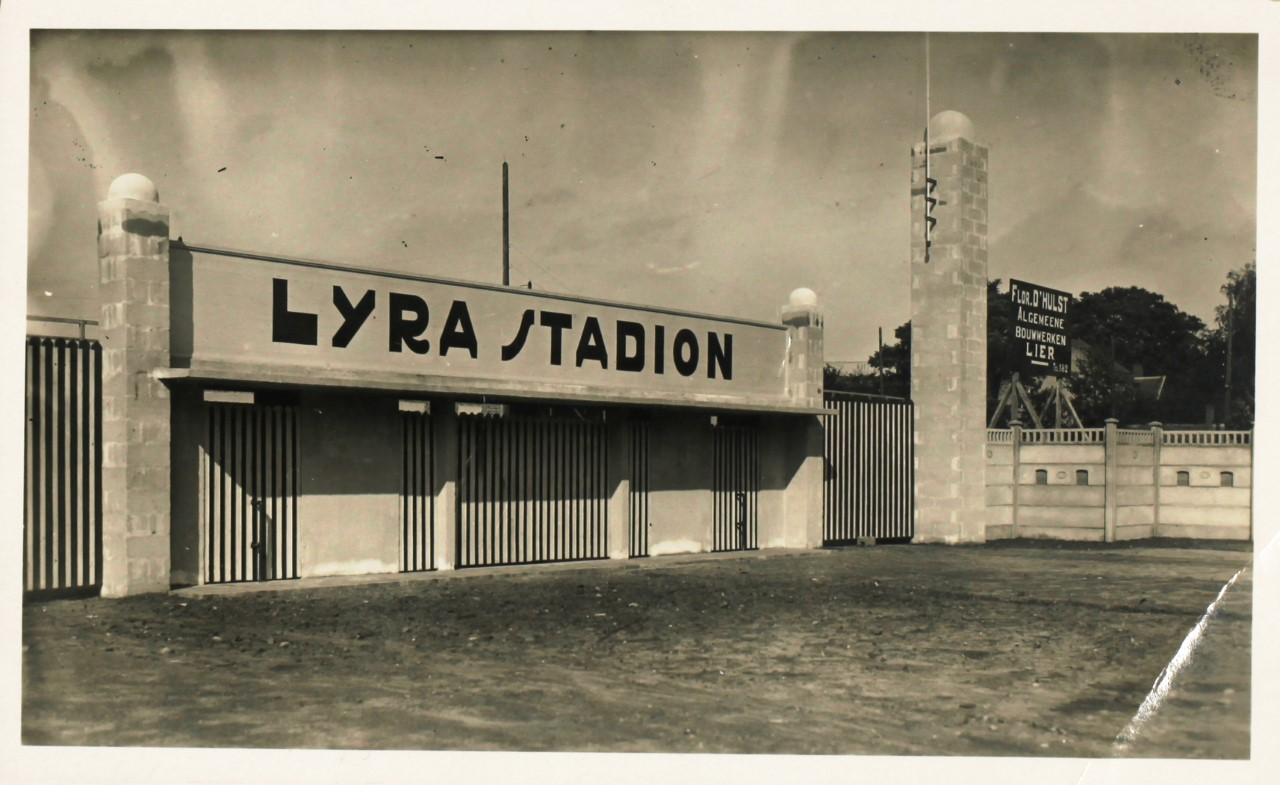
Lyra stadium in 1920 Mechelsesteenweg

The club was founded in 1909 as Turn- en Sportvereniging Lyra, meaning Gym and Sport Association Lyra in Dutch. It registered to the FA the same year to become the matricule n°52. In 1913 the club took part to the second division where it remained until the promotion in 1932. The first spell of the club at the highest level ended in 1938 when it finished 13th on 14. In 1934 the name changed to Koninklijke Maatschappij Lyra and then to Koninklijke Lyra in 1939.

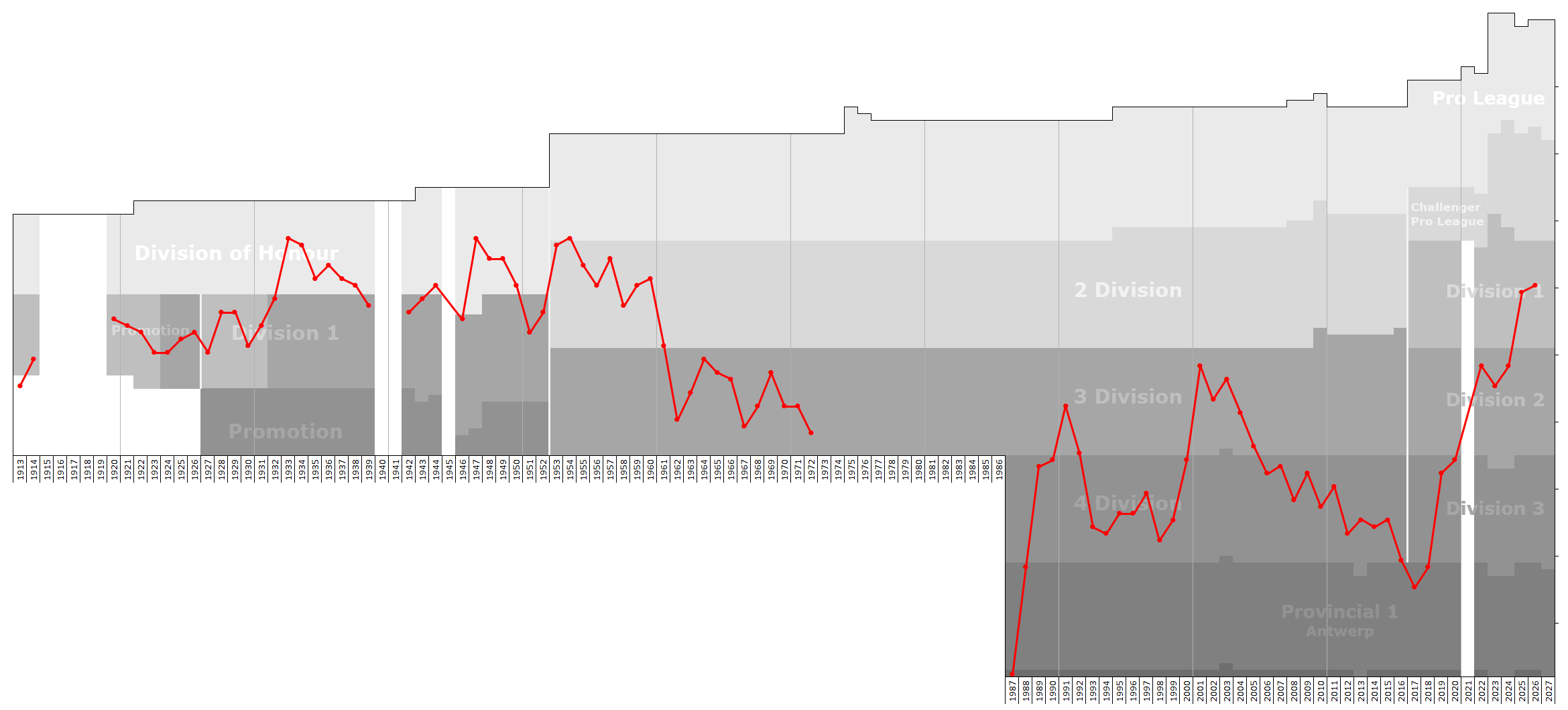
Historical chart of K. Lyra league performance

Lyra achieved its best ranking ever on its first season in the first division with a 6th place. The other spells were 1943–44, 1946–50 and 1953–54. In 1960 the club fell into the third division and decayed. On 12 April 1972 Lyra merged with its neighbour of K. Lierse S.K. to become K. Lierse S.V. with the matricule n°30 of Lierse. On 16 June 1972 a new club named K. Lyra T.S.V. was founded with the matricule n°7776. It now plays in the Promotion C.

The team, and its successor K. Lyra T.S.V., played for over 100 years at the same stadium located in the center of Lier at the Mechelsesteenweg.

== Honours ==
- Belgian Second Division:
  - Winners (4): 1931–32, 1942–43, 1945–46, 1952–53
- Belgian Cup:
  - Runners-up (1): 1934–35

== Former famous players ==
- Jef Piedfort
- Raymond Van Gestel
