= Royale Union Saint-Gilloise =

Belgian professional football club

Union Saint-Gilloise
- Full name: Royale Union Saint-Gilloise
- Nicknames: Les Unionistes; The Old Lady; Union 60; The Apaches
- Founded: 1 November 1897; 129 years ago
- Stadium: Joseph Marien Stadium
- Capacity: 9,400
- Owner: Alex Muzio
- Chairman: Alex Muzio
- Head coach: David Hubert
- League: Belgian Pro League
- 2025–26: Belgian Pro League, 2nd of 16
- Website: rusg.brussels
Home colours	Away colours	Third colours

Royale Union Saint-Gilloise (French: [y.njɔ̃ sɛ̃.ʒil.waz]), also known as Union Saint-Gilloise, Union SG, USG, RUSG or simply Union, is a Belgian professional football club from Brussels based in Forest. Founded in 1897 in the neighbouring Saint-Gilles, the club has played its home matches at the historic Joseph Marien Stadium since the 1920s. One of the most successful clubs in Belgian football history, Union won eleven national titles between 1904 and 1935, dominating the domestic game before World War II. From 1933 to 1935, they went 60 league matches unbeaten—a national record that still stands.

After a long decline that saw the club fall as low as the fourth tier, Union experienced a resurgence in the 2020s following a takeover by British businessman Tony Bloom, also chairman of Brighton & Hove Albion. In 2021, they returned to the Belgian Pro League after 48 years and finished top of the regular-season table in their first campaign back—a first for a newly promoted side. Though they narrowly missed out on the championship in 2022, 2023, and 2024, Union clinched their twelfth league title in 2025, ending a 90-year championship drought—one of the longest in European football.

Alongside a resurgence in domestic competition, the club has returned to regular participation in European competitions. It reached the quarter-finals of the 2022–23 UEFA Europa League and later qualified for the UEFA Champions League league phase for the first time. Union Saint-Gilloise has also been noted for its inclusive stadium atmosphere and has been regarded as a notable recent example of sporting and organizational progress in Belgian football.

== History ==
=== Early glories ===
Royale Union Saint-Gilloise was founded in 1897 under the matricule number 10. The club obtained its first title as champion of Belgium in 1904. A year later, they managed to win the Coupe Van der Straeten Ponthoz, which is considered one of the earliest predecessors to the UEFA Champions League.

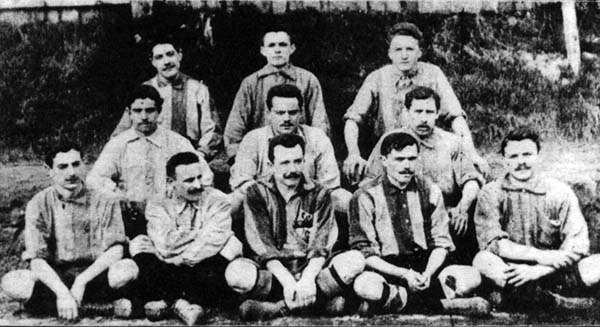
The club won its first Belgian championship in 1903–04.

From 1933 to 1935 the team played 60 consecutive matches undefeated, setting a still unbeaten record in Belgium, winning three league titles in a row across that period led by captain Jules Pappaert.

With its first national title barely a few years after its foundation, Union quickly became a superpower and supplier to the Belgian team for the Olympic Games in 1920.

The 1935 success was the club's eleventh, a Belgian record that would not be broken until the emergence of Anderlecht in the 1960s. Seven of those titles came before the outbreak of World War One in 1914.

Between 1958 and 1965, the club had a brief spell of European success, playing in the Inter-Cities Fairs Cup and reaching the semi-finals in the 1958–60 edition after a two-legged victory against A.S. Roma. In 1963, however, the club was relegated to the second division, and in 1980 even fell as low as the Belgian Promotion division, the fourth tier.

=== Lower division survival ===
In the sixties, Union began to struggle, bouncing between the First and Second Division several times.

In 1973, the club dropped out of the First Division and would not return for 48 years. Two years later in 1975, would come another relegation to the Third Division for the first time.

Union bounced back to the Second Division after just one season, but an even bigger decline followed at the end of the 1970s, back-to-back relegations seeing Union fall from the Second Division to the Fourth in successive years.

The club rallied in the mid-80s to earn back-to-back promotions back up to the Second Division, claiming the Fourth Division crown in 1983 and the Third the following season. But no further progress could be made and Union would move between the second and third flights for close on the next four decades.

Promotion back to the Second Division in 2004 saw two subsequent seasons of Union battling against relegation, but the 2006–07 season started brightly for Union. Promotion back to the First Division was a prospect, until a poor climax to their campaign post-Christmas, leading to the sacking of coach Tshupula Kande, replaced by Alex Czerniatynski.

In May 2007, long-standing clubchairman Enrico Bove resigned along with several other members of the board of directors, and the club suffered another relegation to the Third Division. Bove returned as chairman in 2010 with the backing of new Italian sponsors, but Union's prospects on the pitch continued to suffer.

In 2012–13, Union SG finished 17th out of 19 clubs in the Third Division B, inside the relegation zone. However, KVK Tienen were found guilty of making irregular payments and were automatically relegated to the Fourth Division, earning Union a reprieve via a play-off, which they won 1–0 against RFC de Liège.

Union went on to finish a creditable third in the 2014–15 Belgian Third Division, but again would prosper from other clubs’ problems, as the top two of Cappellen and Sprimont Comblain Sport both passed up applying for a Second Division licence, so Union were promoted in their place.

=== Revival and return to the First Division ===
On 21 May 2018, Tony Bloom, chairman of English Premier League side, Brighton & Hove Albion was confirmed as the majority shareholder. Current Union chairman Alex Muzio was a co-investor with Tony Bloom in 2018. On 7 July 2023 Alex Muzio was confirmed as having become the majority owner of Union.

Promoted from the third tier in 2015, Union quickly established themselves as a top-six side in Division 1B, without becoming a top-3 side.

A change of coach in May 2018 saw Marc Grosjean replaced after three years of finishing 6th, 4th and 6th by Luka Elsner, with Union contesting at the top of Division 1B in 2018–19, which that season was divided into South American-style "opening" and "closing" competitions, framed in the "apertura and clausura" style seen in many countries in the Americas. The winner of each competition would qualify for the promotion play-off final, with automatic promotion being the incentive for a club to try to win both competitions.

Union were second behind Mechelen by six points in the Opening Tournament which concluded at Christmas, and regrouped to take third behind Beerschot Wilrijk in the Closing Tournament. Despite not reaching the final, Union's reward was to be given one of the three places allocated for Division 1B teams in Play-Offs 2, for the right to compete for a place in the UEFA Europa League.

Placed in a group of six with every other opponent being from the top division, USG went unbeaten at home, beating Kortrijk, Waasland-Beveren and Cercle Brugge, drawing with Zulte Waregem and Excel Mouscron. Away wins over Kortrijk, Mouscron and Cercle put them in with a big chance of winning the group to qualify for the Play-Offs 2 Final, but losses away to Waasland-Beveren and Zulte Waregem saw them overtaken by Kortrijk right at the end. The Kerels finished on 24 points, Union 20.

With Elsner taking up a coaching job in France with Amiens SC, Thomas Christiansen was brought in as his replacement, with Union again falling marginally short in both the Opening and Closing Tournaments. However, there was to be no place in Play-Offs 2 this time, as these were abandoned due to the COVID-19 pandemic that saw the 2019–20 season end prematurely in March.

The summer of 2020 saw Felice Mazzu appointed as first-team coach, assisted by Karel Geraerts, with a number of interesting young talents signed from lower-division football both in Belgium and abroad, such as Dante Vanzeir, Deniz Undav, Christian Burgess, Teddy Teuma, and from Virton following that club's denial of a First Division B licence, goalkeeper Anthony Moris and Loïc Lapoussin.

On 13 March 2021, after defeating R.W.D. Molenbeek 2–1 at home, Union were promoted back to the Belgian First Division A. This marked its first appearance in the top flight since 1972. Due to restrictions at the time due to the COVID-19 pandemic, Union fans were not able to celebrate their promotion at the stadium.

=== Title contenders and European football ===
==== 2021–22: Top of regular season, Play-offs runner-ups ====
A sensational return to top-flight football after 48 years away saw a 3–1 opening-day win away to Brussels' traditional giants Anderlecht.

Union in their next match a week later hosted reigning champions Club Brugge on 1 August 2021 in their first home game in the top division since 1973, being edged out 1–0 through a late Eduard Sobol winner.

Union went top of the Pro League on 17 October 2021, passing previous leaders Eupen by virtue of a 4–1 win over Seraing, and would remain there until May. Due to the novelty of being crowned unofficial winter champions, Union were awarded a special trophy by the newspaper HLN.

In a difficult January run against all of the previous season's top four, Union beat Anderlecht, Genk and Royal Antwerp, drawing 0–0 away to Club Brugge.

By the end of the regular season, Union were top on 77 points, five ahead of Club Brugge, with Antwerp and Anderlecht also qualifying for the six rounds of play-offs, where the quartet would bring forward half of the regular season points into the play-offs. Hence, Union would resume on 39, Club 36, with Anderlecht and Antwerp both on 32.

On 10 April 2022, during their first season back in the top flight in 48 years, Union finished the regular season in first place after a draw against last place Beerschot. The match was abandoned after 83 minutes, after Beerschot fans threw flares onto the pitch. Union were later awarded three points due to forfeit. This was the first time that a newly promoted club finished top of the table in the history of the Belgian league.

Union started the play-offs strongly, beating Anderlecht 3–1 and thus becoming the first club ever to inflict three defeats on the Mauves in the same league season. A 0–0 draw away to Antwerp saw the lead over Club Brugge maintained at three points.

The title race swung in the direction of Bruges in back-to-back games between Union and Club, with the champions earning a tight 2–0 win in Brussels to draw level on points, with Club going top under the "half-points" rule, as Union had needed their tally from the regular season rounded-up.

Club Brugge won the midweek return 1–0 at the Jan Breydel through a rebounded own goal from goalkeeper Anthony Moris to take a three-point lead with two games to go. A late equaliser from Casper Nielsen was disallowed by VAR for offside.

Club Brugge clinched the league crown in their next (and penultimate) game against Royal Antwerp, despite Union beating Anderlecht for the fourth time in the season 2–0 at Lotto Park. Eventually, Union finished four points down on Club in second place, with 46 points compared to Club's 50, historically qualifying Union for the UEFA Champions League.

League glory for Union would have seen them become the first newly promoted side to win a top-20 European national league championship at the first attempt since Kaiserslautern's 1998 Bundesliga success.

During their run for the title, coach Felice Mazzu gained a reputation for dancing in front of Union's fans post-match, cited as keeping a light atmosphere within the club and maintaining a close relationship with the Union fans.

Union's runners-up spot qualified them for the UEFA Champions League qualifiers, sending them into European football for the first time since 1964–65, and their first UEFA competition after featuring in five editions of the Fairs Cup in the 1950s and 60s.

After going into first place in October, Union were top for 200 consecutive days.

==== 2022–23: European participation and title contestant ====
Despite an early exit from the UEFA Champions League at the hands of Rangers after a 2–0 "home" win at OH Leuven's Den Dreef stadium and a 3–0 loss at Ibrox, Union dropped into the UEFA Europa League and won their group, earning four victories from their six games against Union Berlin, Braga and Malmö.

A last-16 reunion with Union Berlin saw the Brussels club draw 3–3 away in Berlin, and win their "home" return 3–0 at Anderlecht's Lotto Park. The quarter-finals had them paired with another Bundesliga side in Bayer Leverkusen, who defeated them 5–2 on aggregate (1–1 away, 1–4 home).

Domestically, Union continued their remarkable form from the season before, lying second heading into the final round of the Belgian Pro League regular season and reaching the Belgian Cup semi-finals, only to lose to Royal Antwerp on penalties.

Union reached the final day of the title play-offs in second place on 46 points, with leaders Antwerp also on 46, top by virtue of finishing in first place at the end of the regular season. Third-placers Genk were a point behind on 45. Union would be champions if they won their game against Club Brugge, and Antwerp did not win theirs against Genk. No other scenario would crown Union as champions.

On the final matchday of the Play-offs, Union were leading 1–0 at home against Club Brugge in the 89th minute, and with Racing Genk leading Royal Antwerp 2–1 at the Cegeka Arena, Union were on the way to being champions, with the Pro League trophy being flown via helicopter to the Joseph Marien Stadium.

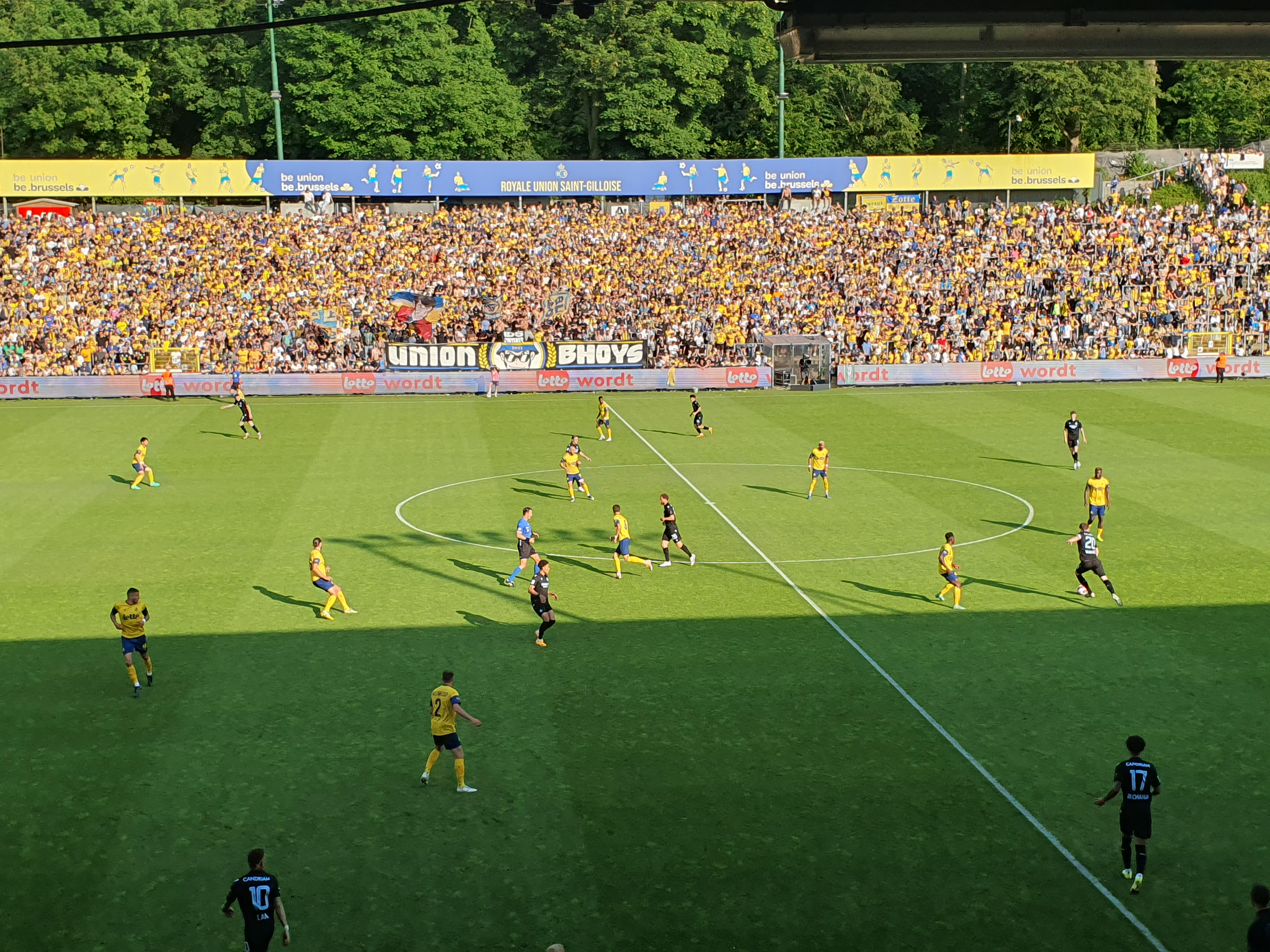
In the last match against C. Brugge, Union ultimately lost the 2022–23 championship

However, three late goals from Club Brugge - two in stoppage-time - and a late Antwerp equaliser from Toby Alderweireld sent the crown Antwerp's way. Union's second consecutive title-race collapse saw them drop to third place which qualified them to the Europa League play-off round.

==== 2023–24: Belgian Cup triumph, European adventure and title contention ====
Owing to a third-place finish in the last season, Union entered in the playoff round of the Europa League. There, they faced FC Lugano and won, qualifying for the Europa League group stage for the second consecutive season. In the group, they were drawn with Liverpool, Toulouse and LASK. They would finish third in the group, but they secured some great results like their 2–1 win over Liverpool. In the UEFA Europa Conference League knockout round playoffs, they were drawn against Eintracht Frankfurt. The first leg finished 2–2, but they won the second leg in Frankfurt 2–1 to win 4–3 on aggregate and qualify for the round of 16 where they lost to Fenerbahce.

Following their 2–0 away win over OH Leuven on 2 March 2024, Union mathematically became the regular season champions for the second time in three seasons, as they had an 8-point lead over city rivals Anderlecht with only two regular season matchdays to go.

On 9 May 2024, Union won their first Cup title after 110 years, following a 1–0 win over Royal Antwerp in the final. In the Champions' Play-offs, Union suffered four consecutive defeats which saw them drop to third place behind rivals Anderlecht and Club Brugge, followed by two wins against Antwerp and two draws against the other two title contenders which minimized their chances to secure the title for the third attempt in a row. Following victories over Cercle Brugge and Genk, Union finished as runners-up, just one point behind the champions, Club Brugge.

==== 2024–25: Historic title triumph ====
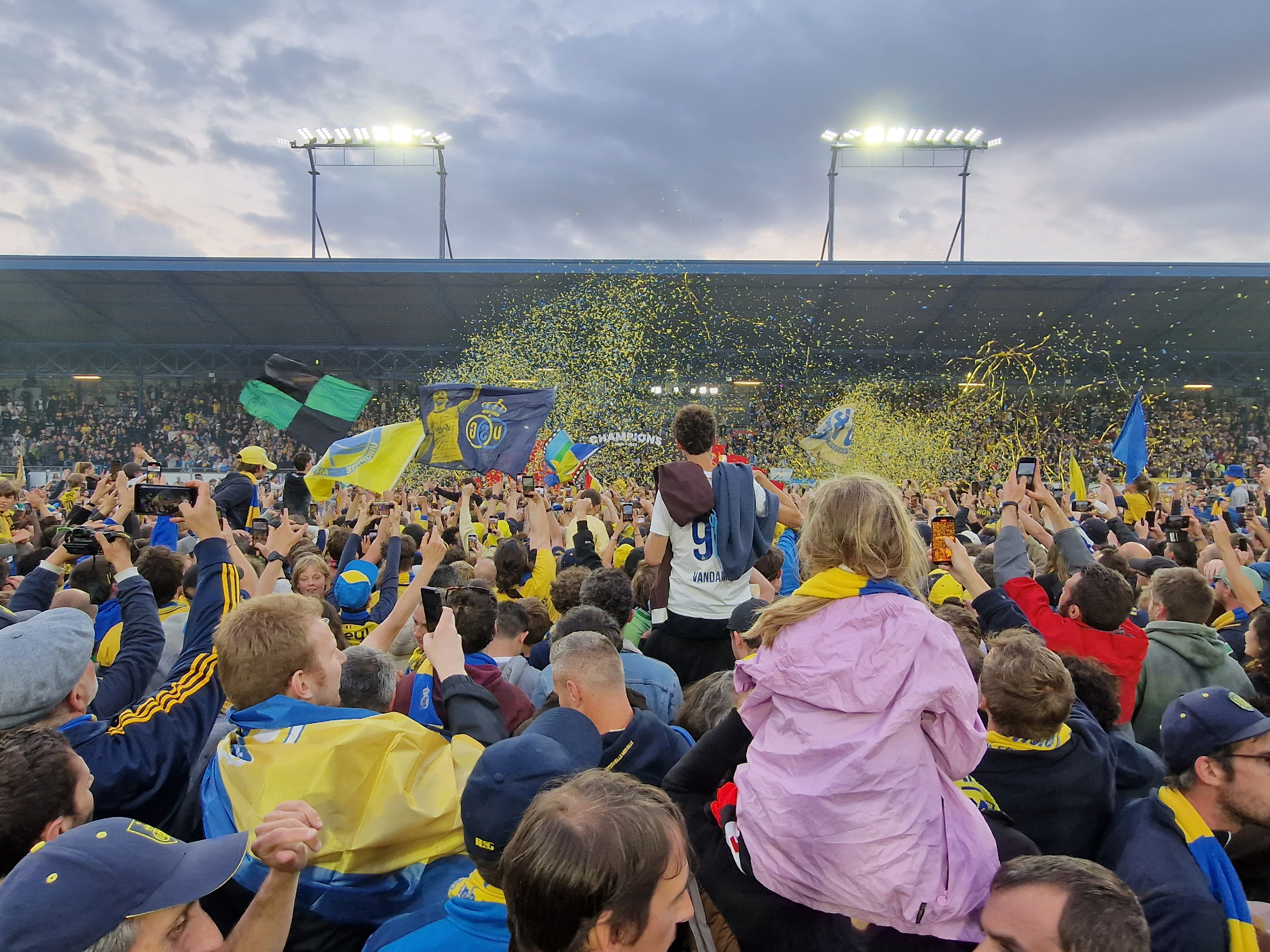
Supporters invade the pitch following Union's victory in the 2024–25 Belgian Pro League.

Union started the 2024–25 season under new coach Sébastien Pocognoli with a 2–1 away win over Club Brugge in the Belgian Super Cup, securing their first ever title in the competition.

They entered in the third qualifying round of the league phase of the Champions League, but lost 4–1 to Slavia Prague on aggregate. This loss did however grant them automatic entry into the Europa League league phase, where they would finish 21st and advance to the knockout playoffs round as an unseeded team. They were drawn against Dutch side AFC Ajax in the playoffs round.

Domestically, they enjoyed a historic league campaign. After finishing the regular season in third place behind Genk and Club Brugge, they entered the Championship Playoffs in strong form. They went unbeaten in the playoffs, winning nine matches and drawing once. Their impressive run included a crucial 1–0 away win over playoff leaders Club Brugge. On the final matchday, a 3–1 victory over Gent sealed their first top-flight title in 90 years, finally achieving glory after three previous near-misses since their promotion. The triumph also secured their first-ever spot in the Champions League league phase for the following season.

==== 2025–26: Belgian Cup title and second-place league finish ====
Union SG competed in the UEFA Champions League for the first time in the club's history, recording three victories from eight matches during the league phase, with wins over PSV Eindhoven, Galatasaray and Atalanta. Domestically, they finished top of the Belgian Pro League regular season, three points ahead of rivals Club Brugge. They later secured their second cup title since promotion, defeating Anderlecht 3–1 after extra time in the Belgian Cup final. However, Union were unable to convert their regular-season success into a league title, ultimately finishing as runners-up after suffering a 5–0 defeat to Club Brugge during the championship play-offs.

== Club culture and supporters ==
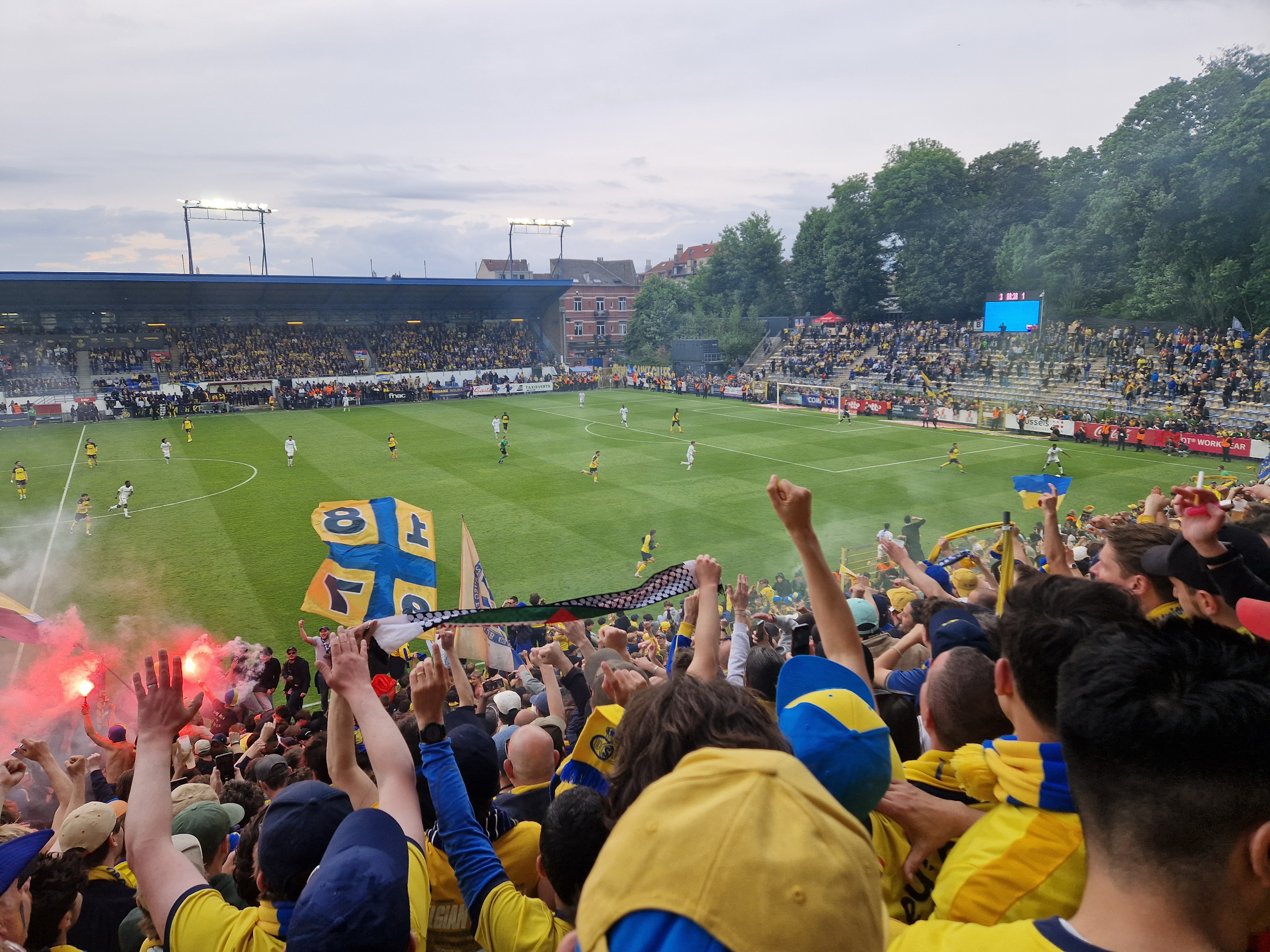
Home game against Gent, May 2025

Union SG adopt blue and yellow as their team colours. Their club anthem is "Le chant des goals" by Jean Narcy. They play "Vamos a la playa" as their stadium goal song, and at the end of home matches. "Anti-fascist Unionist for Life" is the unofficial motto of the club.

Union Saint-Gilloise draws its support primarily from the Brussels-Capital Region, with a particularly strong following in the southern neighbourhoods and among working-class communities in central Brussels, including the Marollen district. The club has also gained a notable amount of support among professionals working in Brussels' European institutions and NATO.

Union supporters are known for their progressive and inclusive values, often promoting anti-fascist and anti-racist ideals. The club's ultras group, known as the Union Bhoys, occupies the all-standing Tribune Est section of the stadium. They maintain amicable relations with supporter groups from RFC Liège and Cercle Brugge.

The Stade Joseph Marien is widely regarded for its welcoming and family-friendly atmosphere, with a diverse mix of spectators, including families and children, regularly attending matches alongside more vocal supporters.

== Rivalries ==
=== Zwanze derby ===
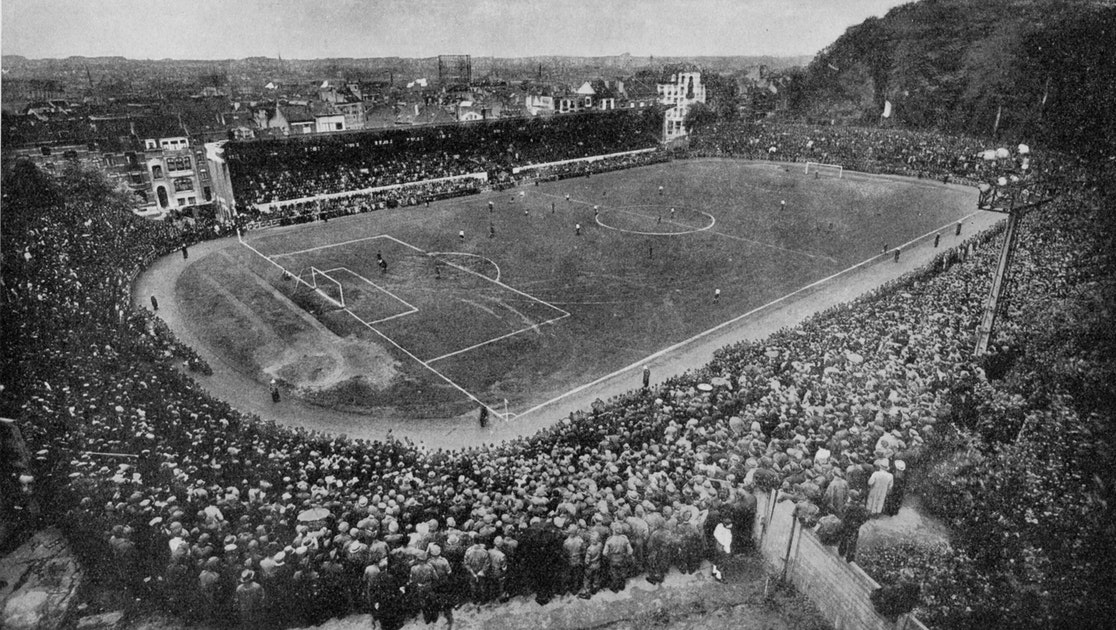
A packed stadium during a match of Union against Daring Club de Bruxelles in the 1930s

Union's principal city rivalry is with RWD Molenbeek, contested in what is colloquially referred to as the Zwanze derby, a term derived from Brussels' dialect and cultural humour. The rivalry traces its origins to earlier confrontations with Daring Club de Bruxelles, a precursor to the modern Molenbeek clubs. This historical animosity has been memorialised in Brussels' popular culture, notably in the play Bossemans et Coppenolle. Despite their rivalry, the two clubs have at times maintained a cordial relationship, especially during periods of financial instability, even organising friendly matches in mutual support.

=== Rivalry with Anderlecht ===
Union also shares a longstanding, though historically less frequent, rivalry with Anderlecht. The two clubs, both based in Brussels, met only sporadically for several decades following Union's relegation in 1973. Their rivalry was rekindled during the 2017–18 Belgian Cup, when Union defeated Anderlecht 3–0 at the Constant Vanden Stock Stadium, marking their first official encounter since 1979.

In 2021, following Union's promotion to the Belgian Pro League after a 49-year absence, the derby resumed in the league format. Union recorded a 3–1 victory in their first top-flight encounter against Anderlecht. In January 2022, they won the return fixture 1–0, completing their first league double over Anderlecht since the early 1970s.

Union went on to defeat Anderlecht twice more in the 2021–22 Champions' Playoffs, with 3–1 and 2–0 wins at home and away, respectively. The season concluded with a controversial managerial shift, as Union head coach Felice Mazzù departed to join Anderlecht, prompting criticism from Union and compensation negotiations between the clubs.

Union faced Anderlecht in the 2026 Belgian Cup final and won 3–1.

== Players ==
=== Current squad ===
As of 4 September 2026

Note: Flags indicate national team as defined under FIFA eligibility rules; some limited exceptions apply. Players may hold more than one non-FIFA nationality.

No.	Pos.	Nation	Player
1	GK	BEL	Vic Chambaere
4	DF	FRA	Nohim Chibani
5	DF	ARG	Kevin Mac Allister
6	MF	BEL	Kamiel Van de Perre
8	MF	ALG	Adem Zorgane
9	FW	GER	Mateo Biondić
10	MF	BEL	Anouar Ait El Hadj
11	FW	BRA	Guilherme Smith
12	GK	BFA	Hervé Koffi (on loan from Lens)
13	FW	ECU	Kevin Rodríguez
14	MF	NED	Ivan Pavlić
17	MF	BEL	Rob Schoofs
18	GK	GEO	Giorgi Kavlashvili

No.	Pos.	Nation	Player
20	FW	ARG	Dylan Aquino
21	DF	BEL	Denzel De Roeve
23	MF	SWE	Besfort Zeneli
25	FW	BEL	Ilan Hurtevent
26	DF	ENG	Ross Sykes
27	DF	BEL	Louis Patris
28	MF	ROU	Darius Olaru
29	DF	SEN	Massiré Sylla
30	FW	AUT	Raul Florucz
38	FW	RSA	Relebohile Mofokeng
55	DF	JPN	Nikki Havenaar
71	GK	BEL	Keo Boets
80	MF	CZE	Ondřej Kričfaluši

=== Out on loan ===
Note: Flags indicate national team as defined under FIFA eligibility rules; some limited exceptions apply. Players may hold more than one non-FIFA nationality.

No.	Pos.	Nation	Player
3	DF	SEN	Mamadou Thierno Barry (on loan at Al Shabab)
7	FW	GHA	Mohammed Fuseini (on loan at Derby County)

No.	Pos.	Nation	Player
12	FW	CAN	Promise David (on loan at Brighton)
48	DF	BEL	Fedde Leysen (on loan at Sassuolo)

=== Personnel achievements ===
- Five players from the Union Saint-Gilloise finished top scorers in the Belgian First Division A
  - 1902–03: (Belgium) Gustave Vanderstappen (? Goals)
  - 1903–04: (Belgium) Gustave Vanderstappen (30 Goals)
  - 1909–10: (Belgium) Maurice Vertongen (36 Goals)
  - 1922–23: (Belgium) Achille Meyskens (24 Goals)
  - 1933–34: (Belgium) Vital Van Landeghem (29 Goals)
  - 2021–22: (Germany) Deniz Undav (26 Goals)
- Two players from the Union Saint-Gilloise finished top scorers in the Belgian Second Division
  - 1950–51: (Belgium) Frans Laureys (28 Goals)
  - 2020–21: (Belgium) Dante Vanzeir / (Georgia (country)) Georges Mikautadze – RFC Seraing (29 Goals)
- A player from the Union Saint-Gilloise finished top scorer in the UEFA Europa League
  - 2022–23: (Nigeria) Victor Boniface / (England) Marcus Rashford – (England) Manchester United (6 Goals)

=== Notable former Players ===
- (Belgium) Gustave Vanderstappen (1897–1910)
- (Belgium) Joseph Romdenne (1899–1905)
- (Belgium) Charles Vanderstappen (1900–1910)
- (Belgium) Paul Grumeau (1902–1911)
- (Belgium) Maurice Tobias (1902–1909/1911–1912)
- (Belgium) Joseph Vanderstappen (1903–1910)
- (Belgium) Edgard Poelmans (1903–1914)
- (Belgium) / (England) Georges Hebdin (1903–1920)
- (Belgium) Louis Van Hege (1907–1910/1917–1924)
- (Belgium) Maurice Vertongen (1909–1911)
- (Belgium) Émile Hanse (1909–1926)
- (Belgium) Joseph Musch (1910–1924)
- (Belgium) Alphonse Six (1912–1913)
- (Belgium) Achille Meyskens (1913–1914/1919–1927)
- (Belgium) Robert Coppée (1913–1929)
- (Belgium) Jules Pappaert (1920–1938)
- (Belgium) François Vanden Eynde (1930–1947)
- (Belgium) André Vandeweyer (1931–1943)
- (Belgium) Vital Van Landeghem (1932–1938)
- (Belgium) Constant Vanden Stock (1938–1943)
- (Belgium) Henri Dirickx (1943–1961)
- (Belgium) Frans Laureys (1947–1959)
- (Belgium) Paul Van Den Berg (1954–1965)
- (Zaire) Julien Kialunda (1960–1965)
- (Belgium) Jacques Teugels (1968–1971)
- (Luxembourg) Paul Philipp (1970–1974/1976–1980)
- (Germany) Harald Nickel (1975–1976)
- (Belgium) Dany Ost (1979–1987/1988–1994)
- (Belgium) Gaby Mudingayi (1998–2000)
- (Syria) Sanharib Malki (2002–2006)
- (Italy) Ignazio Cocchiere (2012–2016)
- (Belgium) Pietro Perdichizzi (2016–2020)
- (Belgium) Mathias Fixelles (2016–2021)
- (Malta) Teddy Teuma (2019–2023)
- (Germany) Deniz Undav (2020–2022)
- (Belgium) Dante Vanzeir (2020–2023)
- (Madagascar) Loïc Lapoussin (2020–2025)
- (Luxembourg) Anthony Moris (2020–2025)
- (Belgium) Guillaume François (2020-2026)
- (England) Christian Burgess (2020-2026)
- (Nigeria) Victor Boniface (2022–2023)
- (Spain) Cameron Puertas (2022–2024)
- (Japan) Koki Machida (2022–2025)

== Staff ==
Position	Name
Head coach	(Belgium) David Hubert
Assistant coach	(Belgium) Bart Meert
Assistant coach	(United States) (Belgium) Wouter Hias
Goalkeeping coach	(Belgium) Niels Hermans
Fitness coach	(Belgium) Balder Berckmans
Sports director	(Republic of Ireland) Chris O'Loughlin
Video analyst	(Belgium) Marc Delcourt
Team manager	(Belgium) Annelies Menten
Delegate	(Belgium) Philippe Wery

=== Medical ===
Doctors

- (Belgium) Koen Pansaers
- (Belgium) Axel Marlaire

Physios

- (Belgium) Stephen Van den Berg
- (Belgium) Ivan Del Molino
- (Belgium) Wilfried Schiemsky

== Honours ==
Type	Competition	Titles	Seasons
Domestic	Belgian First Division	12	1903–04, 1904–05, 1905–06, 1906–07, 1908–09, 1909–10, 1912–13, 1922–23, 1932–33, 1933–34, 1934–35, 2024–25
Domestic	Belgian Cup	4	1912–13, 1913–14, 2023–24, 2025–26
Domestic	Belgian Super Cup	2	2024, 2026
Domestic	Belgian Second Division	4	1900–01, 1950–51, 1963–64, 2020–21
Domestic	Belgian Third Division A	2	1975–76, 1983–84
Domestic	Belgian Third Division B	1	2003–04
Domestic	Belgian Fourth Division	1	1982–83

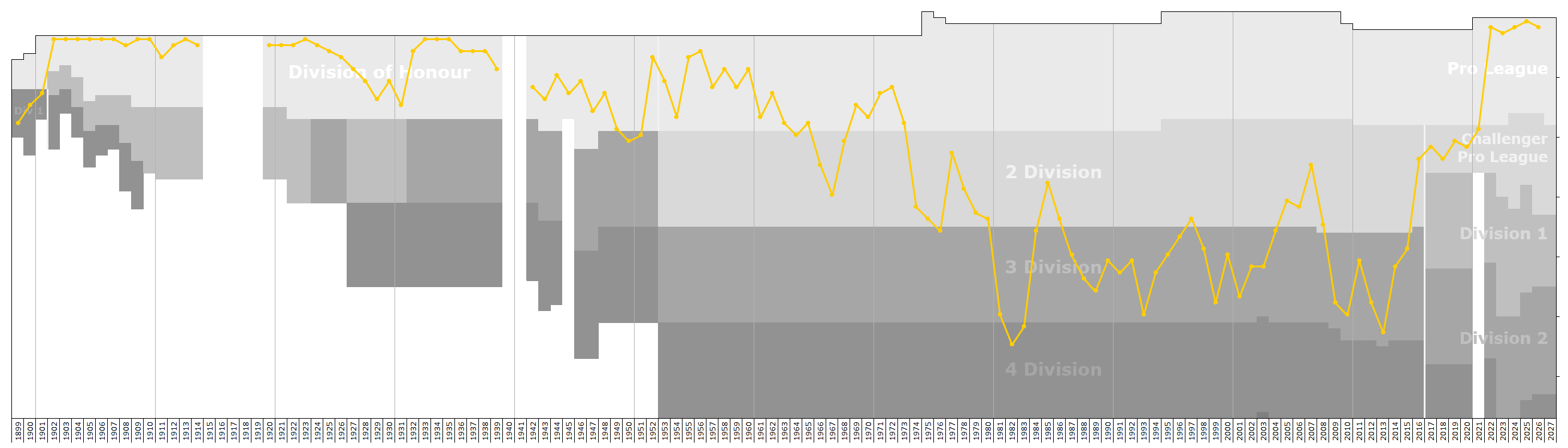
Historical chart of Union SG league performance

=== Minor titles ===
- Jules Pappaert Cup
  - Winners (4): 1956, 1976, 2021, 2022

=== European ===
- Challenge International du Nord (1898–1914)
  - Winners (3): 1904, 1905, 1907
  - Runners-up (1): 1908
- Coupe Van der Straeten Ponthoz (1900–1907)
  - Winners (3): 1905, 1906, 1907
  - Runners-up (1): 1904
- Coupe Jean Dupuich (1908–1925)
  - Winners (4): 1912, 1913, 1914, 1925
  - Runners-up (1): 1908
- UEFA Champions League (1955– )
  - Group Stage (1): 2025-26
- UEFA Europa League (1955– )
  - 1/2 (1): 1958–60
  - 1/4 (1): 2022–23
  - 1/16 (1): 2024–25
- UEFA Europa Conference League (2022– )
  - 1/8 (1): 2023–24

== Union SG in European competitions ==
=== Summary ===
In the early 1900s, Union had a dominant spell in some of the first "European" Cup competitions that took place, prior to officially sanctioned UEFA competitions.

The Apaches took part in the first European competitions, the Challenge International du Nord, the Coupe Van der Straeten Ponthoz and the Coupe Jean Dupuich between 1898 and 1925.

Later on, Union Saint-Gilloise went 58 years between appearances in European competitions, entering the 2022–23 UEFA Champions League in the third qualifying round, having last appeared in the 1964–65 Inter-Cities Fairs Cup.

In the 2022–23 season, the team played their group stage home games at Den Dreef and their knockout phase home games at the Lotto Park, as the Joseph Marien Stadium does not meet the UEFA requirements. The team made its debut in the Europa League group stage that season, winning its first match away at Union Berlin. They also went on to win Group D. Ajax and Union Berlin were eliminated in the knockout stages, but in the quarterfinals, Bayer Leverkusen proved too strong.

Union Saint-Gilloise made a successful debut in the Champions League in the 2025–26 season, winning 3–1 away at PSV Eindhoven.

=== Record ===
Season	Competition	Round	Opponent	Home	Away	Aggregate	(Note: Round or group progressed or eliminated)
1958–60	Inter-Cities Fairs Cup	First round	(Germany) Leipzig XI	6–1	0–1	6–2	
1958–60	Inter-Cities Fairs Cup	Quarter-final	(Italy) Roma	2–0	1–1	3–1	
1958–60	Inter-Cities Fairs Cup	Semi-final	(England) Birmingham City	2–4	2–4	4–8	
1960–61	Inter-Cities Fairs Cup	First round	(Italy) Roma	0–0	1–4	1–4	
1961–62	Inter-Cities Fairs Cup	First round	(Scotland) Heart of Midlothian	1–3	0–2	1–5	
1962–63	Inter-Cities Fairs Cup	First round	(France) Marseille	4–2	0–1	4–3	
1962–63	Inter-Cities Fairs Cup	Second round	(Socialist Federal Republic of Yugoslavia) Dinamo Zagreb	1–0	1–2	2–2 (Note: Because of the tie, a play-off match was held, which Dinamo Zagreb won 3–2.)	
1964–65	Inter-Cities Fairs Cup	First round	(Italy) Juventus	0–1	0–1	0–2	
2022–23	UEFA Champions League	Third qualifying round	(Scotland) Rangers	2–0	0–3	2–3	
2022–23	UEFA Europa League	Group stage	(Portugal) Braga	3–3	2–1	1st	
2022–23	UEFA Europa League	Group stage	(Sweden) Malmö FF	3–2	2–0	1st	
2022–23	UEFA Europa League	Group stage	(Germany) Union Berlin	0–1	1–0	1st	
2022–23	UEFA Europa League	Round of 16	(Germany) Union Berlin	3–0	3–3	6–3	
2022–23	UEFA Europa League	Quarter-final	(Germany) Bayer Leverkusen	1–4	1–1	2–5	
2023–24	UEFA Europa League	Play-off round	(Switzerland) Lugano	2–0	1–0	3–0	
2023–24	UEFA Europa League	Group stage	(France) Toulouse	1–1	0–0	3rd	
2023–24	UEFA Europa League	Group stage	(England) Liverpool	2–1	0–2	3rd	
2023–24	UEFA Europa League	Group stage	(Austria) LASK	2–1	0–3	3rd	
2023–24	UEFA Europa Conference League	Knockout round play-off	(Germany) Eintracht Frankfurt	2–2	2–1	4–3	
2023–24	UEFA Europa Conference League	Round of 16	(Turkey) Fenerbahçe	0–3	1–0	1–3	
2024–25	UEFA Champions League	Third qualifying round	(Czech Republic) Slavia Prague	0–1	1–3	1–4	
2024–25	UEFA Europa League	League phase	(Turkey) Fenerbahçe	—N/a	1–2	21st	
2024–25	UEFA Europa League	League phase	(Norway) Bodø/Glimt	0–0	—N/a	21st	
2024–25	UEFA Europa League	League phase	(Denmark) Midtjylland	—N/a	0–1	21st	
2024–25	UEFA Europa League	League phase	(Italy) Roma	1–1	—N/a	21st	
2024–25	UEFA Europa League	League phase	(Netherlands) Twente	—N/a	1–0	21st	
2024–25	UEFA Europa League	League phase	(France) Nice	2–1	—N/a	21st	
2024–25	UEFA Europa League	League phase	(Portugal) Braga	2–1	—N/a	21st	
2024–25	UEFA Europa League	League phase	(Scotland) Rangers	—N/a	1–2	21st	
2024–25	UEFA Europa League	Knockout phase play-off	(Netherlands) Ajax	0–2	2–1 (a.e.t.)	2–3	
2025–26	UEFA Champions League	League phase	(Netherlands) PSV Eindhoven	—N/a	3–1	27th	
2025–26	UEFA Champions League	League phase	(England) Newcastle United	0–4	—N/a	27th	
2025–26	UEFA Champions League	League phase	(Italy) Inter Milan	0–4	—N/a	27th	
2025–26	UEFA Champions League	League phase	(Spain) Atlético Madrid	—N/a	1–3	27th	
2025–26	UEFA Champions League	League phase	(Turkey) Galatasaray	—N/a	1–0	27th	
2025–26	UEFA Champions League	League phase	(France) Marseille	2–3	—N/a	27th	
2025–26	UEFA Champions League	League phase	(Germany) Bayern Munich	—N/a	0–2	27th	
2025–26	UEFA Champions League	League phase	(Italy) Atalanta	1–0	—N/a	27th	
2026–27	UEFA Champions League	Third qualifying round	(Norway) Bodø/Glimt	3–3	2–3 (a.e.t.)	5–6	
2026–27	UEFA Europa League	League phase	(Czech Republic) Viktoria Plzeň	—N/a	3–0		
2026–27	UEFA Europa League	League phase	(Spain) Real Sociedad	1–1	—N/a		
2026–27	UEFA Europa League	League phase	(Israel) Hapoel Be'er Sheva	4–0	—N/a		
2026–27	UEFA Europa League	League phase	(Spain) Celta Vigo	—N/a	2–1		
2026–27	UEFA Europa League	League phase	(Poland) Lech Poznań		—N/a		
2026–27	UEFA Europa League	League phase	(France) Lyon	—N/a			
2026–27	UEFA Europa League	League phase	(Turkey) Beşiktaş	—N/a			
2026–27	UEFA Europa League	League phase	(Scotland) Celtic		—N/a		

=== Report ===
- (Germany) Leipzig XI (1958–1959)
- (Germany) Eintracht Frankfurt (2024)
- (Germany) 1. FC Union Berlin (2022/2023)
- (Germany) Bayer Leverkusen (2023)
- (Germany) 1. FC Nürnberg (1913)
- (Germany) FC Bayern Munich (2025)
- (Italy) Roma (1959/1960/2024)
- (Italy) Juventus (1964)
- (Italy) Atalanta BC (2025)
- (Italy) Inter Milan (2025)
- (Scotland) Rangers (2022/2025)
- (Scotland) Heart of Midlothian (1961)
- (Portugal) Braga (2022/2025)
- (Spain) Atlético Madrid (2025)
- (France) Nice (2024)
- (France) Toulouse (2023)
- (France) Marseille (1962/2025)
- (France) US Tourcoing (1908)
- (France) RC Roubaix (1904)
- (Belgium) RFC Liège (1902/1904)
- (Netherlands) PSV Eindhoven (2025)
- (Netherlands) Ajax Amsterdam (2025)
- (Netherlands) Twente (2024)
- (Netherlands) EFC PW 1885 (1905)
- (Netherlands) Feyenoord Rotterdam (1923/1925)
- (Netherlands) Sparta Rotterdam (1907)
- (Netherlands) FC Dordrecht (1902)
- (Netherlands) Koninklijke HFC (1905)
- (Netherlands) HBS Craeyenhout (1903/1904)
- (Denmark) Midtjylland (2024)
- (Norway) Bodø/Glimt (2024)
- (Turkey) Fenerbahçe (2024/2024)
- (Turkey) Galatasaray (2025)
- (Czech Republic) Slavia Prague (2024)
- (England) Newcastle United F.C. (2025)
- (England) Liverpool F.C. (2023)
- (England) Birmingham City F.C. (1959)
- (England) St Albans City F.C. (1925)
- (England) Ilford F.C. (1911/1912)
- (England) Barking F.C. (1913)
- (England) Corinthians F.C. (1923)
- (Austria) LASK (2023)
- (Switzerland) Lugano (2023)
- (Croatia) Dinamo Zagreb (1962–1963)
- (Sweden) Malmö FF (2022)

Note: All dates in italics refer to matches in the first European cups: Challenge International du Nord, Coupe Van der Straeten Ponthoz, Coupe Jean Dupuich.

== See also ==
- The Invincibles
