= 1933–34 Belgian First Division =

34th season of top-tier football in Belgium

Belgian First Division
- Season: 1933–34

Statistics of Belgian First Division in the 1933–34 season.

== Overview ==
Location of teams in Belgian First Division 1933–34

It was contested by 14 teams, and Royale Union Saint-Gilloise won the championship.

== League standings ==
| Pos | Team | Pld | W | D | L | GF | GA | GD | Pts | Relegation |
|---|---|---|---|---|---|---|---|---|---|---|
| 1 | Royale Union Saint-Gilloise | 26 | 17 | 9 | 0 | 88 | 35 | +53 | 43 | |
| 2 | Daring Club | 26 | 16 | 3 | 7 | 67 | 42 | +25 | 35 | |
| 3 | Standard Liège | 26 | 17 | 1 | 8 | 92 | 65 | +27 | 35 | |
| 4 | Lierse S.K. | 26 | 14 | 1 | 11 | 56 | 57 | −1 | 29 | |
| 5 | Royal Antwerp FC | 26 | 9 | 9 | 8 | 71 | 54 | +17 | 27 | |
| 6 | Beerschot | 26 | 11 | 5 | 10 | 60 | 53 | +7 | 27 | |
| 7 | KM Lyra | 26 | 10 | 6 | 10 | 49 | 52 | −3 | 26 | |
| 8 | Cercle Brugge K.S.V. | 26 | 9 | 7 | 10 | 53 | 50 | +3 | 25 | |
| 9 | KV Mechelen | 26 | 10 | 5 | 11 | 71 | 56 | +15 | 25 | |
| 10 | RC de Gand | 26 | 7 | 8 | 11 | 53 | 69 | −16 | 22 | |
| 11 | K.R.C. Mechelen | 26 | 6 | 8 | 12 | 40 | 58 | −18 | 20 | |
| 12 | Belgica FC Edegem | 26 | 8 | 4 | 14 | 66 | 76 | −10 | 20 | |
| 13 | R.R.C. Bruxelles | 26 | 7 | 3 | 16 | 47 | 97 | −50 | 17 | Relegated to Division I |
| 14 | Tilleur | 26 | 6 | 1 | 19 | 43 | 92 | −49 | 13 | Relegated to Division I |

== Results ==
| Home \ Away | ANT | BEE | CER | DAR | RCB | EDE | GAN | LIE | LYR | KVM | RCM | STA | TIL | USG |
|---|---|---|---|---|---|---|---|---|---|---|---|---|---|---|
| Antwerp | | 2–2 | 1–1 | 1–4 | 7–1 | 3–1 | 5–2 | 3–1 | 2–2 | 3–1 | 2–2 | 4–3 | 2–0 | 2–2 |
| Beerschot | 2–2 | | 2–2 | 3–1 | 2–0 | 2–5 | 1–7 | 5–0 | 0–2 | 4–1 | 6–2 | 0–3 | 6–0 | 2–2 |
| Cercle Brugge | 2–2 | 4–2 | | 2–1 | 3–3 | 4–1 | 1–1 | 3–1 | 0–0 | 4–2 | 3–1 | 2–4 | 4–0 | 3–4 |
| Daring Club | 2–0 | 3–1 | 3–2 | | 1–0 | 4–2 | 4–1 | 3–1 | 3–1 | 2–1 | 1–0 | 4–1 | 5–2 | 2–3 |
| Racing Bruxelles | 0–8 | 1–2 | 2–0 | 1–1 | | 1–6 | 4–2 | 4–1 | 9–6 | 0–3 | 0–2 | 3–2 | 6–3 | 1–10 |
| Edegem | 2–9 | 0–3 | 1–2 | 1–7 | 7–1 | | 3–3 | 2–3 | 4–2 | 0–0 | 2–2 | 3–1 | 6–1 | 0–5 |
| Racing Gand | 3–2 | 0–2 | 1–2 | 2–2 | 1–2 | 1–9 | | 2–2 | 3–1 | 0–0 | 1–0 | 4–3 | 4–2 | 1–2 |
| Lierse | 4–3 | 2–0 | 2–1 | 3–1 | 5–1 | 3–1 | 4–2 | | 2–1 | 2–4 | 2–1 | 3–2 | 2–3 | 1–3 |
| TSV Lyra | 2–0 | 0–4 | 2–1 | 1–1 | 2–1 | 3–1 | 0–0 | 0–2 | | 4–2 | 1–0 | 1–2 | 7–1 | 1–5 |
| KV Mechelen | 5–3 | 2–3 | 5–1 | 1–3 | 8–1 | 2–3 | 1–4 | 2–1 | 1–1 | | 1–1 | 10–5 | 2–1 | 2–2 |
| K.R.C. Mechelen | 2–2 | 2–1 | 2–2 | 3–1 | 3–1 | 1–1 | 2–2 | 2–1 | 1–2 | 2–4 | | 2–3 | 4–1 | 1–1 |
| Standard Liège | 3–2 | 6–4 | 3–2 | 2–1 | 6–2 | 4–1 | 10–2 | 6–2 | 3–1 | 4–1 | 6–1 | | 3–2 | 2–4 |
| Tilleur | 1–1 | 4–1 | 0–3 | 2–5 | 6–2 | 3–2 | 2–1 | 1–3 | 1–3 | 0–9 | 4–0 | 2–3 | | 0–6 |
| Union SG | 4–0 | 0–0 | 2–1 | 5–2 | 0–0 | 6–2 | 3–3 | 3–1 | 3–3 | 2–1 | 7–1 | 2–2 | 2–1 | |

Legend: Blue = home team win; Yellow = draw; Red = away team win.
