= 1932–33 Belgian First Division =

33rd season of top-tier football in Belgium

Belgian First Division
- Season: 1932–33

Statistics of Belgian First Division in the 1932–33 season.

== Overview ==
Location of teams in Belgian First Division 1932–33

It was contested by 14 teams, and Royale Union Saint-Gilloise won the championship.

== League standings ==
Pos	Team	Pld	W	D	L	GF	GA	GD	Pts	Relegation
1	Royale Union Saint-Gilloise	26	19	5	2	69	22	+47	43	
2	Royal Antwerp FC	26	16	4	6	69	38	+31	36	
3	Cercle Brugge K.S.V.	26	14	5	7	40	29	+11	33	
4	Standard Liège	26	14	3	9	77	56	+21	31	
5	Lierse S.K.	26	12	6	8	71	42	+29	30	
6	KM Lyra	26	11	6	9	51	54	−3	28	
7	Beerschot	26	12	4	10	51	54	−3	28	
8	Daring Club	26	8	8	10	43	45	−2	24	
9	KV Mechelen	26	8	7	11	49	54	−5	23	
10	R.R.C. Bruxelles	26	7	6	13	43	58	−15	20	
11	K.R.C. Mechelen	26	8	4	14	43	57	−14	20	
12	RC de Gand	26	7	3	16	40	78	−38	17	
13	Club Brugge K.V.	26	6	4	16	39	73	−34	16	Relegated to Division I
14	K Berchem Sport	26	4	7	15	35	60	−25	15	Relegated to Division I

== Results ==
Home \ Away	ANT	BEE	BRC	CER	CLU	DAR	RCB	GAN	LIE	LYR	KVM	RCM	STA	USG
Antwerp		4–3	6–2	0–1	2–0	3–1	1–0	8–0	2–1	3–3	1–4	1–0	4–0	0–0
Beerschot	2–8		2–0	1–0	5–1	6–2	0–0	2–4	0–6	0–0	4–1	2–2	3–2	4–1
Berchem	0–4	2–0		0–0	2–0	2–2	4–0	3–3	0–3	0–1	2–1	0–3	0–0	1–2
Cercle Brugge	1–0	1–0	2–0		4–1	1–0	2–0	5–2	2–1	0–4	0–0	2–4	1–2	3–4
Club Brugge	1–4	3–5	2–2	3–1		1–1	3–2	3–1	1–1	0–1	1–2	4–3	4–2	1–1
Daring Club	2–0	1–0	1–1	2–3	3–1		1–1	2–0	2–2	8–3	0–0	4–1	2–1	0–1
Racing Bruxelles	2–2	1–1	3–1	1–1	5–1	0–3		5–1	1–4	3–4	3–1	1–0	5–2	0–1
Racing Gand	2–4	0–1	3–2	1–1	5–0	1–0	1–4		1–0	5–4	2–1	2–3	3–4	0–0
Lierse	1–1	5–1	6–1	0–1	5–2	5–2	2–2	4–0		7–0	1–5	5–3	2–2	1–0
Lyra	1–2	3–0	3–2	1–1	4–1	3–1	4–1	3–0	2–1		1–1	1–2	1–2	1–5
KV Mechelen	2–3	1–5	3–3	1–3	2–1	2–2	5–2	2–0	2–4	1–1		1–0	4–3	1–2
K.R.C. Mechelen	1–5	0–1	2–1	0–2	1–2	1–1	4–0	3–2	3–1	2–2	1–1		0–6	0–2
Standard Liège	5–0	2–3	4–2	0–2	4–2	2–0	4–1	7–1	4–1	3–0	7–4	6–3		0–0
Union SG	3–1	4–0	4–2	1–0	5–0	4–0	5–0	7–0	2–2	3–0	2–1	2–1	8–3	

Legend: Blue = home team win; Yellow = draw; Red = away team win.
