= 1934–35 Belgian First Division =

355th season of top-tier football in Belgium

Belgian First Division
- Season: 1934–35

Statistics of Belgian First Division in the 1934–35 season.

== Overview ==
Location of teams in Belgian First Division 1934–35

It was contested by 14 teams, and Royale Union Saint-Gilloise won the championship.

== League standings ==
Pos	Team	Pld	W	D	L	GF	GA	GD	Pts	Relegation
1	Royale Union Saint-Gilloise	26	21	3	2	84	29	+55	45	
2	Lierse S.K.	26	19	2	5	78	39	+39	40	
3	Daring Club	26	15	5	6	69	42	+27	35	
4	Beerschot	26	14	5	7	63	39	+24	33	
5	Royal Antwerp FC	26	13	4	9	80	55	+25	30	
6	Cercle Brugge K.S.V.	26	12	3	11	46	40	+6	27	
7	Standard Liège	26	10	6	10	73	67	+6	26	
8	K.R.C. Mechelen	26	8	7	11	41	55	−14	23	
9	K Berchem Sport	26	11	1	14	63	74	−11	23	
10	White Star	26	9	3	14	47	73	−26	21	
11	KV Mechelen	26	8	4	14	61	61	0	20	
12	K. Lyra	26	8	3	15	49	75	−26	19	
13	RC de Gand	26	5	4	17	37	74	−37	14	Relegated to Division I
14	Belgica FC Edegem	26	3	2	21	49	117	−68	8	Relegated to Division I

== Results ==
Home \ Away	ANT	BEE	BRC	CER	DAR	EDE	GAN	LIE	LYR	KVM	RCM	STA	USG	WST
Antwerp		2–2	1–2	3–3	3–1	6–5	1–1	0–2	3–5	3–1	1–1	7–3	1–3	5–0
Beerschot	4–1		2–1	1–0	1–2	7–0	4–1	2–2	4–2	2–1	6–0	2–3	1–0	4–1
K Berchem Sport	1–5	0–2		2–1	3–5	5–2	4–1	3–1	5–0	2–4	3–2	7–5	1–6	4–2
Cercle Brugge	3–1	2–1	0–2		1–2	3–0	3–0	4–1	5–0	2–0	0–1	3–2	1–2	3–0
Daring Club	3–2	3–3	5–1	3–0		6–2	5–2	1–2	4–0	4–2	4–0	1–3	2–0	4–1
Edegem	1–5	1–3	1–5	4–2	2–2		2–4	1–7	3–4	3–4	4–2	4–4	1–2	1–8
Racing Gand	1–8	3–0	3–2	1–3	1–2	9–2		1–3	1–5	0–1	0–0	2–2	0–3	2–0
Lierse	2–1	5–1	6–1	2–0	2–1	4–3	5–0		2–1	3–2	3–2	3–1	1–3	8–0
Lyra	2–3	1–1	5–1	1–0	1–1	4–2	5–0	1–1		1–0	1–2	0–4	0–1	3–5
KV Mechelen	2–5	4–1	5–4	0–1	3–3	1–2	3–1	2–3	12–2		0–1	3–3	2–2	2–3
K.R.C. Mechelen	3–4	1–1	0–0	1–3	2–1	4–1	1–1	2–3	3–1	3–1		2–2	0–2	3–1
Standard Liège	0–5	0–5	4–1	1–1	4–0	7–1	3–1	1–5	6–3	2–3	7–1		1–1	4–3
Union SG	4–1	2–1	5–3	7–0	1–1	6–1	4–1	2–1	5–1	3–1	3–2	2–1		10–3
White Star	0–3	1–2	1–0	2–2	0–3	3–0	3–0	3–1	1–0	2–2	2–2	1–0	1–5	

Legend: Blue = home team win; Yellow = draw; Red = away team win.
