= List of Belgian First Division seasons =

This is a list of Belgian First Division seasons.

- Championship Cup 1895-96
- Championship Cup 1896-97
- Championship Cup 1897-98
- Championship Cup 1898-99
- Championship Cup 1899-1900
- Championship Cup 1900-01
- Championship Cup 1901-02
- Championship Cup 1902-03
- Championship Cup 1903-04
- Belgian First Division 1904-05
- Belgian First Division 1905-06
- Belgian First Division 1906-07
- Belgian First Division 1907-08
- Belgian First Division 1908-09
- Belgian First Division 1909-10
- Belgian First Division 1910-11
- Belgian First Division 1911-12
- Belgian First Division 1912-13
- Belgian First Division 1913-14
- Belgian First Division 1919-20
- Belgian First Division 1920-21
- Belgian First Division 1921-22
- Belgian First Division 1922-23
- Belgian First Division 1923-24
- Belgian First Division 1924-25
- Belgian First Division 1925-26
- Belgian Premier Division 1926-27
- Belgian Premier Division 1927-28
- Belgian Premier Division 1928-29
- Belgian Premier Division 1929-30
- Belgian Premier Division 1930-31
- Belgian Premier Division 1931-32
- Belgian Premier Division 1932-33
- Belgian Premier Division 1933-34
- Belgian Premier Division 1934-35
- Belgian Premier Division 1935-36
- Belgian Premier Division 1936-37
- Belgian Premier Division 1937-38
- Belgian Premier Division 1938-39
- Belgian Premier Division 1941-42
- Belgian Premier Division 1942-43
- Belgian Premier Division 1943-44
- Belgian Premier Division 1945-46
- Belgian Premier Division 1946-47
- Belgian Premier Division 1947-48
- Belgian Premier Division 1948-49
- Belgian Premier Division 1949-50
- Belgian Premier Division 1950-51
- Belgian Premier Division 1951-52
- Belgian First Division 1952-53
- Belgian First Division 1953-54
- Belgian First Division 1954-55
- Belgian First Division 1955-56
- Belgian First Division 1956-57
- Belgian First Division 1957-58
- Belgian First Division 1958-59
- Belgian First Division 1959-60
- Belgian First Division 1960-61
- Belgian First Division 1961-62
- Belgian First Division 1962-63
- Belgian First Division 1963-64
- Belgian First Division 1964-65
- Belgian First Division 1965-66
- Belgian First Division 1966-67
- Belgian First Division 1967-68
- Belgian First Division 1968-69
- Belgian First Division 1969-70
- Belgian First Division 1970-71
- Belgian First Division 1971-72
- Belgian First Division 1972-73
- Belgian First Division 1973-74
- Belgian First Division 1974-75
- Belgian First Division 1975-76
- Belgian First Division 1976-77
- Belgian First Division 1977-78
- Belgian First Division 1978-79
- Belgian First Division 1979-80
- Belgian First Division 1980-81
- Belgian First Division 1981-82
- Belgian First Division 1982-83
- Belgian First Division 1983-84
- Belgian First Division 1984-85
- Belgian First Division 1985-86
- Belgian First Division 1986-87
- Belgian First Division 1987-88
- Belgian First Division 1988-89
- Belgian First Division 1989-90
- Belgian First Division 1990-91
- Belgian First Division 1991-92
- Belgian First Division 1992-93
- Belgian First Division 1993-94
- Belgian First Division 1994-95
- Belgian First Division 1995-96
- Belgian First Division 1996-97
- Belgian First Division 1997-98
- Belgian First Division 1998-99
- Belgian First Division 1999-2000
- Belgian First Division 2000-01
- Belgian First Division 2001-02
- Belgian First Division 2002-03
- Belgian First Division 2003-04
- Belgian First Division 2004-05
- Belgian First Division 2005-06
- Belgian First Division 2006-07
- Belgian First Division 2007-08
- Belgian First Division 2008-09
- Belgian First Division 2009-10
- Belgian First Division 2010-11
- Belgian Pro League 2011-12
- Belgian Pro League 2012-13
- Belgian Pro League 2013-14
- Belgian Pro League 2014-15
- Belgian Pro League 2015-16
- Belgian First Division A 2016-17
