= 1927–28 in Belgian football =

Football in Belgium
- Season: 1927–28

The 1927–28 season was the 28th season of competitive football in Belgium. The Belgian Cup was not played this season and would only resume during the 1934-35 season. The Belgium national football team took part to their 3rd Olympic Games football tournament. They qualified for the quarter-finals, losing to Argentina. Beerschot AC won the Premier Division.

== Overview ==
At the end of the season, SC Anderlechtois and RFC Brugeois were relegated to the Division I, while FC Malinois (Division I winner) and Tilleur FC were promoted to the Premier Division. For the first time test matches have been played to determine the second team to relegate to the Division I as 4 teams finished at the 10th place with the same number of points. The loser of this final round, RFC Brugeois, was relegated to the Division I. The Promotion - the third level in Belgian football - was won by AS Renaisien, Vilvorde FC and Tubantia FAC. The three clubs were replaced by the 12th, 13th and 14th placed teams in the Division I, i.e. respectively Courtrai Sports, Oude God Sport and Fléron FC.

== National team ==
| Date | Venue | Opponents | Score* | Comp | Belgium scorers | Match Report |
|---|---|---|---|---|---|---|
| September 4, 1927 | Stockholm Olympic Stadium, Stockholm (A) | Sweden | 0-7 | F | | FA website |
| January 8, 1928 | Oscar Bossaert Stadium, Brussels (H) | Austria | 1-2 | F | François Ledent | FA website |
| February 12, 1928 | Stade de Sclessin, Liège (H) | Irish Free State | 2-4 | F | Raymond Braine, François Ledent | FA website |
| March 11, 1928 | Olympic Stadium, Amsterdam (A) | The Netherlands | 1-1 | F | Raymond Braine | FA website |
| April 1, 1928 | Bosuilstadion, Antwerp (H) | The Netherlands | 1-0 | F | Jacques Moeschal | FA website |
| April 15, 1928 | Stade Olympique de Colombes, Paris (A) | France | 3-2 | F | Bernard Voorhoof, Raymond Braine | FA website |
| May 19, 1928 | Olympisch Stadion, Antwerp (H) | England | 1-3 | F | Jacques Moeschal | FA website |
| May 27, 1928 | Olympic Stadium, Amsterdam (N) | Luxembourg | 5-3 | OFR | Raymond Braine (2), Louis Versyp, Jacques Moeschal (2) | FA website |
| June 2, 1928 | Olympic Stadium, Amsterdam (N) | Argentina | 3-6 | OQF | Raymond Braine, Florimond Van Halm, Jacques Moeschal | FA website |
| June 5, 1928 | Sparta Stadion Het Kasteel, Rotterdam (N) | The Netherlands | 1-3 | OCS | Pierre Braine | FA website |

* Belgium score given first

Key

- H = Home match
- A = Away match
- N = On neutral ground
- F = Friendly
- OFR = Olympic Games First Round
- OQF = Olympic Games quarter-finals
- OCS = Olympic Games consolation semi-finals
- o.g. = own goal

== Honours ==
| Competition | Winner |
|---|---|
| Premier Division | Beerschot AC |
| Division I | FC Malinois |
| Promotion | AS Renaisien, Vilvorde FC and Tubantia FAC |

== Final league tables ==
=== Division I ===
| Pos | Team | Pld | Won | Drw | Lst | GF | GA | Pts | GD | Notes |
|---|---|---|---|---|---|---|---|---|---|---|
| 1 | FC Malinois | 26 | 17 | 5 | 4 | 100 | 35 | 39 | +65 | Promoted to Premier Division. |
| 2 | Tilleur FC | 26 | 17 | 4 | 5 | 72 | 39 | 38 | +33 | Promoted to Premier Division. |
| 3 | TSV Lyra | 26 | 16 | 5 | 5 | 83 | 43 | 37 | +40 | |
| 4 | RFC Liégeois | 26 | 13 | 4 | 9 | 48 | 50 | 30 | -2 | |
| 5 | Boom FC | 26 | 12 | 5 | 9 | 59 | 67 | 29 | -8 | |
| 6 | CS La Forestoise | 26 | 11 | 6 | 9 | 67 | 69 | 28 | -2 | |
| 7 | Uccle Sport | 26 | 12 | 3 | 11 | 68 | 60 | 27 | +8 | |
| 8 | White Star AC | 26 | 9 | 6 | 11 | 57 | 57 | 24 | 0 | |
| 9 | CS Tongrois | 26 | 9 | 6 | 11 | 55 | 68 | 24 | -13 | |
| 10 | FC Turnhout | 26 | 9 | 4 | 13 | 49 | 53 | 22 | -4 | |
| 11 | CS Verviétois | 26 | 9 | 4 | 13 | 50 | 69 | 22 | -19 | |
| 12 | Courtrai Sports | 26 | 7 | 6 | 13 | 47 | 61 | 20 | -14 | Relegated to Promotion. |
| 13 | Oude God Sport | 26 | 5 | 5 | 16 | 49 | 78 | 15 | -29 | Relegated to Promotion. |
| 14 | Fléron FC | 26 | 4 | 1 | 21 | 50 | 105 | 9 | -55 | Relegated to Promotion. |
