= 1924–25 in Belgian football =

Football in Belgium
- Season: 1924–25

The 1924–25 season was the 25th season of competitive football in Belgium. Beerschot AC won their third Division I title. At the end of the season, RC de Bruxelles, FC Malinois and White Star AC were relegated to the Promotion, while RC de Malines, CS Verviétois and R Tilleur FC were promoted.

== National team ==
Date	Venue	Opponents	Score*	Comp	Belgium scorers	Match Report
October 5, 1924	Idraetspark, Copenhagen (A)	Denmark	1-2	F	Ferdinand Adams	FA website
November 11, 1924	Oscar Bossaert Stadium, Brussels (H)	France	3-0	F	Pierre Braine, Georges Despae	FA website
December 8, 1924	The Hawthorns, West Bromwich (A)	England	0-4	F		FA website
March 15, 1925	Olympisch Stadion, Antwerp (H)	The Netherlands	0-1	F		FA website
May 3, 1925	Sportpark Oud-Roosenburgh, Amsterdam (A)	The Netherlands	0-5	F		FA website
May 21, 1925	MTK Stadium, Budapest (A)	Hungary	3-1	F	Victor Houet, Ferdinand Adams, Ivan Thys	FA website
May 24, 1925	Stade Olympique de la Pontaise, Lausanne (A)	Switzerland	0-0	F		FA website

* Belgium score given first

Key

- H = Home match
- A = Away match
- N = On neutral ground
- F = Friendly
- o.g. = own goal

== Honours ==
Competition	Winner
Division I	Beerschot AC
Promotion	R Tilleur FC and CS Verviétois

== Final league tables ==
=== Promotion ===
==== Promotion A ====
Pos	Team	Pld	Won	Drw	Lst	GF	GA	Pts	GD	Notes
1	R Tilleur FC	26	20	4	2	84	27	44	+57	Promoted to First Division
2	RC de Malines	26	19	4	3	84	28	42	+56	Promoted to First Division
3	RFC Liégeois	26	17	7	2	58	15	41	+43	
4	Oude God Sport	26	12	6	8	32	28	30	+4	
5	AS Herstalienne	26	10	7	9	38	39	27	-1	
6	Stade Louvaniste	26	10	4	12	35	39	24	-4	
7	TSV Lyra	26	9	6	11	27	31	24	-4	
8	FC Sérésien	26	9	6	11	38	48	24	-10	
9	AS Ostendaise	26	8	7	11	43	59	23	-16	
10	ESC de Bruxelles	26	7	6	13	37	54	20	-14	
11	Charleroi SC	26	6	7	13	30	40	19	-10	
12	EFC Hasselt	26	7	5	14	40	68	19	-28	
13	RFC Montegnée	26	7	4	15	33	48	18	-15	
14	SV Audenaerde	26	3	3	20	22	77	9	-55	

==== Promotion B ====
Pos	Team	Pld	Won	Drw	Lst	GF	GA	Pts	GD	Notes
1	CS Verviétois	26	13	10	3	49	19	36	+30	Promoted to First Division
2	Liersche SK	26	13	9	4	50	28	35	+22	
3	Saint-Ignace SC Antwerpen	26	13	8	5	48	34	34	+14	
4	Uccle Sport	26	13	6	7	61	40	32	+21	
5	CS La Forestoise	26	11	7	8	59	45	29	+14	
6	R Léopold Club de Bruxelles	26	11	6	9	45	46	28	-1	
7	Courtrai Sports	26	10	7	9	50	43	27	+7	
8	Boom FC	26	11	4	11	65	47	26	+18	
9	AS Renaisienne	26	8	8	10	46	39	24	+7	
10	SR Dolhain FC	26	7	9	10	40	47	23	-7	
11	SC de Theux	26	8	5	13	43	61	21	-18	
12	SV Blankenberghe	26	7	7	12	39	62	21	-23	
13	FC de Bressoux	26	6	8	12	41	59	20	-18	
14	Jeunesse Arlonaise	26	2	4	20	19	85	8	-66	
