= 1901–02 Belgian First Division =

7th season of top-tier football in Belgium

Belgian First Division
- Season: 1901–02

Statistics of Belgian First Division in the 1901–02 season.

== Overview ==
Location of teams in Belgian First Division 1901–02

This season saw another split, after just one season, into two Groups, this time with a Final Group to decide the champion.
It was contested by 11 teams, and Racing Club de Bruxelles won the championship.

== League standings ==
=== Championship Cup A ===
Pos	Team	Pld	W	D	L	GF	GA	GD	Pts	Qualification	RCB	BEE	ANT	CSB	SKI	FCB
1	Racing Bruxelles	9	8	1	0	35	5	+30	17	Qualified for Final Round		1–0	5–0	4–0	7–0	5–0 (Note: Match awarded.)
2	Beerschot	10	6	1	3	19	10	+9	13	Qualified for Final Round	1–4		3–1	4–1	8–0	5–0
3	Antwerp	9	4	2	3	11	13	−2	10		1–1	0–0		4–1	5–0	5–0
4	CS Brugeois	9	3	0	6	13	26	−13	6		0–5	3–1	3–1		1–2	3–1
5	Skill Bruxelles	10	3	0	7	10	26	−16	6	Not participating next season.	0–5	0–5	0–2	4–1		4–2
6	FC Brugeois	7	1	0	6	6	14	−8	2		1–3	0–2	0–2	0–1	2–0	

=== Championship Cup B ===
Pos	Team	Pld	W	D	L	GF	GA	GD	Pts	Qualification	USG	LÉO	FCL	ARC	VER
1	Union SG	8	7	0	1	16	1	+15	14	Qualified for Final Round		5–0	4–0	2–0	5–0 (Note: Match awarded.)
2	Léopold	8	5	0	3	24	11	+13	10	Qualified for Final Round	0–3		2–5	7–2	6–1
3	Liége	8	3	1	4	16	21	−5	7		5–0	3–2		4–2	1–1
4	Athletic Club Bruxelles	8	3	0	5	15	22	−7	6		1–2	0–2	2–1		5–2
5	Verviers	8	1	1	6	10	23	−13	3		5–0	0–2	5–2	1–2	

=== Final round ===
Pos	Team	Pld	W	D	L	GF	GA	GD	Pts	Qualification	RCB	LÉO	USG	BEE
1	Racing Bruxelles	6	4	1	1	15	8	+7	9	Play-off as level on points.		1–3	2–0	3–2
2	Léopold	6	4	1	1	14	10	+4	9	Play-off as level on points.	2–2		3–1	5–0 (Note: Match awarded.)
3	Union SG	6	2	0	4	9	15	−6	4		0–3	1–3		4–2
4	Beerschot	6	1	0	5	12	17	−5	2		1–4	5–3	2–3	

=== Test match ===
Team 1	Score	Team 2
Racing Club de Bruxelles	4 - 3	Léopold Club de Bruxelles

== See also ==
- 1901–02 in Belgian football
