= 1923–24 in Belgian football =

Football in Belgium
- Season: 1923–24

The 1923–24 season was the 24th season of competitive football in Belgium. Beerschot AC won their second Division I title. At the end of the season, RC de Malines, CS Verviétois and RFC Liégeois were relegated to the Promotion, while and SC Anderlechtois, FC Malinois and White Star AC were promoted.

== National team ==
Date	Venue	Opponents	Score*	Comp	Belgium scorers	Match Report
November 1, 1923	Bosuilstadion, Antwerp (H)	England	2-2	F	Henri Larnoe, Achille Schelstraete	FA website
January 13, 1924	Stade Buffalo, Paris (A)	France	0-2	F		FA website
March 23, 1924	Sportpark Oud-Roosenburgh, Amsterdam (A)	The Netherlands	1-1	F	Robert Coppée	FA website
April 27, 1924	Olympisch Stadion, Antwerp (H)	The Netherlands	1-1	F	Ivan Thys	FA website
May 29, 1924	Stade Olympique de Colombes, Paris (N)	Sweden	1-8	OR2	Henri Larnoe	FA website

* Belgium score given first

Key

- H = Home match
- A = Away match
- N = On neutral ground
- F = Friendly
- OR2 = Summer Olympics second round
- o.g. = own goal

== Honours ==
Competition	Winner
Division I	Beerschot AC
Promotion	SC Anderlechtois and White Star AC

== Final league tables ==
=== Promotion ===
==== Promotion A ====
Pos	Team	Pld	Won	Drw	Lst	GF	GA	Pts	GD	Notes
1	SC Anderlechtois	26	22	2	2	90	15	46	+75	Promoted to First Division.
2	FC Malinois	26	16	8	2	68	27	40	+41	Promoted to First Division.
3	Liersche SK	26	14	7	5	51	30	35	+21	
4	AS Ostendaise	26	11	9	6	40	36	31	+4	
5	SR Dolhain FC	26	12	4	10	40	42	28	-2	
6	Oude God Sport	26	10	6	10	41	36	26	+5	
7	Saint-Ignace SC Antwerpen	26	10	6	10	42	37	26	+5	
8	ESC de Bruxelles	26	11	4	11	50	48	26	+2	
9	FC de Bressoux	26	11	4	11	45	49	26	-4	
10	RFC Montegnée	26	11	4	11	41	53	26	-12	
11	CS Schaerbeek	26	6	9	11	33	34	21	-1	
12	SRU Verviers	26	7	4	15	36	50	18	-14	
13	AEC Mons	26	3	4	19	26	78	10	-52	
14	US Tournaisienne	26	1	3	22	9	77	5	-68	

==== Promotion B ====
Pos	Team	Pld	Won	Drw	Lst	GF	GA	Pts	GD	Notes
1	CS La Forestoise	26	17	5	4	65	29	39	+36	Play-off as finished level on points.
2	White Star AC	26	16	7	3	53	30	39	+23	Play-off as finished level on points.
3	Tilleur FC	26	14	7	5	68	28	35	+40	
4	R Léopold Club de Bruxelles	26	15	5	6	67	39	35	+28	
5	AS Herstalienne	26	13	9	4	44	29	35	+15	
6	Uccle Sport	26	13	5	8	48	33	31	+15	
7	Stade Louvaniste	26	10	9	7	39	36	29	+3	
8	SV Blankenberghe	26	11	6	9	56	53	28	+3	
9	TSV Lyra	26	10	6	10	41	44	26	-3	
10	AS Renaisienne	26	10	3	13	38	54	23	-16	
11	Vilvorde FC	26	7	4	15	38	56	18	-18	
12	AA Termondoise	26	5	4	17	29	56	14	-27	
13	Entente Tamines	26	2	3	21	19	68	7	-49	
14	Fléron FC	26	2	1	23	25	75	5	-50	

Team 1	Score	Team 2
White Star AC	2 - 1	CS La Forestoise

White Star AC were promoted to First Division.
