= 1928–29 in Belgian football =

Football in Belgium
- Season: 1928–29

The 1928–29 season was the 29th season of competitive football in Belgium. R Antwerp FC won their first Premier Division title, after a test match they won 2–0 to rival Beerschot AC. The test match was played because both teams ended up the season with the same number of points at the top of the Premier Division.

== Overview ==
At the end of the season, ARA La Gantoise and Tilleur FC were relegated to the Division I, while RFC Brugeois (Division I winner) and SC Anderlechtois were promoted to the Premier Division. The Promotion – the third level in Belgian football – was won by SK Roulers, Charleroi SC and RFC Montegnée. The three clubs were replaced by the 12th, 13th and 14th placed teams in the Division I, i.e. respectively CS Tongrois, Boom FC and AS Renaisien.

== National team ==
Date	Venue	Opponents	Score*	Comp	Belgium scorers	Match Report
November 4, 1928	Olympic Stadium, Amsterdam (A)	The Netherlands	1–1	F	Raymond Braine	FA website
April 20, 1929	Dalymount Park, Dublin (A)	Irish Free State	0–4	F		FA website
May 5, 1929	Olympisch Stadion, Antwerp (H)	The Netherlands	3–1	F	Raymond Braine (2), Michel Vanderbauwhede	FA website
May 11, 1929	Stade de la Butte, Brussels (H)	England	1–5	F	Jacques Moeschal	FA website
May 26, 1929	Stade du Pont d'Ougrée, Liège (H)	France	4–1	F	Michel Vanderbauwhede, Raymond Braine, Désiré Bastin	FA website

* Belgium score given first

Key

- H = Home match
- A = Away match
- N = On neutral ground
- F = Friendly
- o.g. = own goal

== Honours ==
Competition	Winner
Premier Division	R Antwerp FC
Division I	RFC Brugeois
Promotion	SK Roulers, Charleroi SC and RFC Montegnée

== Final league tables ==
=== Division I ===
Pos	Team	Pld	Won	Drw	Lst	GF	GA	Pts	GD	Notes
1	RFC Brugeois	26	20	3	3	79	28	43	+51	Promoted to Premier Division.
2	SC Anderlechtois	26	18	2	6	81	37	38	+44	Promoted to Premier Division.
3	TSV Lyra	26	15	4	7	60	45	34	+15	
4	Uccle Sport	26	13	4	9	60	53	30	+7	
5	FC Turnhout	26	12	6	8	58	48	30	+10	
6	CS La Forestoise	26	11	4	11	65	53	26	+12	
7	Vilvorde FC	26	10	4	12	63	54	24	+9	
8	Tubantia FAC	26	9	6	11	55	60	24	−5	
9	RFC Liégeois	26	10	4	12	47	53	24	−6	
10	CS Verviétois	26	10	2	14	57	73	22	−16	
11	White Star AC	26	8	6	12	43	58	22	−15	
12	CS Tongrois	26	8	5	13	51	70	21	−19	Relegated to Promotion.
13	Boom FC	26	7	5	14	59	72	19	−13	Relegated to Promotion.
14	AS Renaisienne	26	2	3	21	23	97	7	−74	Relegated to Promotion.
