= Ivan Thys =

Belgian footballer

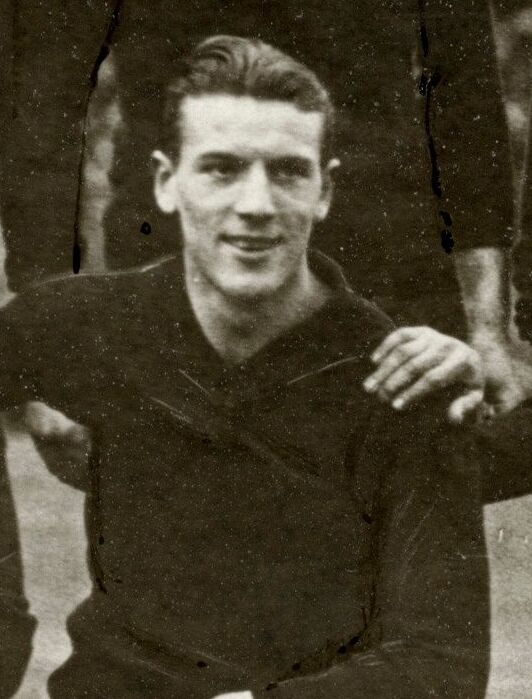

Personal information
- Date of birth: 29 April 1897
- Place of birth: Antwerp, Belgium
- Date of death: 15 February 1982 (aged 84)
- Place of death: Antwerp, Belgium
- Position: Striker

Senior career*
Years	Team	Apps	(Gls)
1919-31	Beerschot	203	(132)

International career
1921-26	Belgium	21	(7)
- * Club domestic league appearances and goals

Ivan Thys (29 April 1897 – 15 February 1982) was a Belgian footballer who played as a forward.

Ivan Thys played 203 games for Beerschot, scoring 132 goals and making him twice the Belgian First Division top scorer. He played in twenty matches for the Belgium national football team between 1921 and 1926.

Ivan Thys was the father of the future head coach of Belgium, Guy Thys.

== Honours ==
=== Club ===
==== Beerschot ====
- Belgian First Division champions: 1921–22, 1923-24, 1924-25, 1925-26, 1927-28

=== Individual ===
- Belgian First Division top scorer: 1920–21 (23 goals), 1921–22 (21 goals)
