= 1903–04 Belgian First Division =

9th season of top-tier football in Belgium

Belgian First Division
- Season: 1903–04

Statistics of Belgian First Division in the 1903–04 season.

== Overview ==
Location of teams in Belgian First Division 1903–04

It was contested by 12 teams, and Union Saint-Gilloise won the championship.

== League standings ==
=== Championship Cup A ===
Pos	Team	Pld	W	D	L	GF	GA	GD	Pts	Qualification	USG	FCB	CSB	ANT	OLY	BEE	ARC
1	Union SG	12	11	0	1	60	14	+46	22	Qualified for Final Round		4–2	3–0	5–0	8–3	8–3	5–1
2	FC Brugeois	12	8	1	3	51	24	+27	17	Qualified for Final Round	2–6		1–2	5–2	5–0 (Note: Match awarded.)	5–0	7–0
3	CS Brugeois	12	7	3	2	31	18	+13	17		2–1	1–1		5–0	4–1	5–0	6–0
4	Antwerp	12	5	1	6	23	32	−9	11		1–3	1–3	0–0		5–0	5–3	3–1
5	Olympia Bruxelles	12	2	2	8	22	49	−27	6	Not participating next season.	2–3	3–6	1–1	6–0		5–0	1–4
6	Beerschot	11	2	1	8	21	47	−26	5		0–9	3–4	3–0	0–3	9–3		0–5
7	Athletic Club Bruxelles	11	1	2	8	13	37	−24	4		1–2	1–6	2–3	1–3	1–1	0–0	

=== Championship Cup B ===
Pos	Team	Pld	W	D	L	GF	GA	GD	Pts	Qualification	RCB	LÉO	DAR	FCL	VER
1	Racing Bruxelles	8	5	1	2	33	12	+21	11	Qualified for Final Round		2–3	10–0	6–0	3–1
2	Léopold Club de Bruxelles	8	4	2	2	21	16	+5	10	Qualified for Final Round	2–2		1–0	4–5	2–0
3	Daring Club	8	3	2	3	17	26	−9	8		2–5	3–3		2–0	4–3
4	Liége	8	3	0	5	11	24	−13	6		1–0	2–1	1–3		1–2
5	Verviétois	8	2	1	5	20	24	−4	5		3–5	2–5	3–3	6–1	

=== Final round ===
Pos	Team	Pld	W	D	L	GF	GA	GD	Pts	USG	RCB	FCB	LÉO
1	Union SG	6	6	0	0	25	4	+21	12		3–2	5–0 (Note: Match awarded.)	5–0
2	Racing Bruxelles	6	2	2	2	11	0	+11	6	0–3		1–1	1–1
3	FC Brugeois	6	1	2	3	10	17	−7	4	1–6	1–3		5–0
4	Léopold	6	0	2	4	5	20	−15	2	1–3	1–4	2–2	

== See also ==
- 1903–04 in Belgian football
