= 1899–1900 in Belgian football =

Football in Belgium
- Season: 1899–1900

The 1899–1900 season was the fifth competitive season in Belgian football.

== Overview ==
Only one official division existed at the time, split into two leagues. It was called Coupe de Championnat (Championship Cup) and its winner was decided after a two-legged final match between the winners of each league.

At the end of the season it was decided to merge the two league in one. Antwerp F.C. withdrew from the league after nearly every player left the club for the new Beerschot and F.C. Courtraisien was relegated. The clubs that replaced those two were Beerschot and Verviers F.C.

== Honour ==
Competition	Winner
Championship Cup	Racing Club de Bruxelles

== League standings ==
=== Championship Group A ===
Pos	Team	Pld	Won	Drw	Lst	GF	GA	Pts	GD	Notes
1	Racing Club de Bruxelles	10	7	0	3	28	12	14	+16	Play-off to decide Group winner
2	Antwerp F.C.	10	6	2	2	15	14	14	+1	Play-off to decide Group winner
3	Athletic and Running Club de Bruxelles	10	5	2	3	12	14	12	-2	
4	F.C. Liégeois	10	5	1	4	14	20	11	-6	
5	Léopold Club de Bruxelles	10	4	1	5	18	16	9	+2	
6	Skill F.C. de Bruxelles	10	0	0	10	3	16	0	-13	

Team 1	Score	Team 2
Racing Club de Bruxelles	1 - 0	Antwerp F.C.

Racing Club de Bruxelles Qualified for the National Final.

=== Championship Group B ===
Pos	Team	Pld	Won	Drw	Lst	GF	GA	Pts	GD	Notes
1	F.C. Brugeois	No results available at this time								Qualified for Play-off Final
2	C.S. Brugeois	No results available at this time								
3	R.C. Gantois	No results available at this time								
4	F.C. Courtraisien	No results available at this time								

=== Final ===
Team 1	Agg.	Team 2	1st leg	2nd leg
Racing Club de Bruxelles	11 - 1	F.C. Brugeois	3 - 0	8 - 1
