= 1922–23 in Belgian football =

Football in Belgium
- Season: 1922–23

The 1922–23 season was the 23rd season of competitive football in Belgium. Union Saint-Gilloise won their 8th Division I title. At the end of the season, SC Anderlechtois and Uccle Sport were relegated to the Promotion, while RFC Liégeois and RC de Gand were promoted.
The format of the Promotion was changed for the following season, with two Divisions of 14 clubs each and the winners of each Division promoting to Division I.

== National team ==
Date	Venue	Opponents	Score*	Comp	Belgium scorers	Match Report
February 2, 1923	Olympisch Stadion, Antwerp (H)	Spain	1-0	F	Robert Coppée	FA website
February 25, 1923	Stade de la Butte, Brussels (H)	France	4-1	F	Henri Larnoe (2), Maurice Gillis (2)	FA website
March 19, 1923	Highbury, London (A)	England	6-1	F	Honoré Vlaminck	FA website
April 29, 1923	Sportpark Oud-Roosenburgh, Amsterdam (A)	The Netherlands	1-1	F	Ivan Thys	FA website
May 5, 1923	Oscar Bossaert Stadium, Brussels (H)	England amateur	3-0	F	Henri Larnoe, Ivan Thys, Maurice Gillis	FA website

* Belgium score given first

Key

- H = Home match
- A = Away match
- N = On neutral ground
- F = Friendly
- o.g. = own goal

== Honours ==
Competition	Winner
Division I	Union Saint-Gilloise
Promotion	RFC Liégeois

== Final league tables ==
=== Promotion ===
Pos	Team	Pld	Won	Drw	Lst	GF	GA	Pts	GD	Notes
1	RFC Liégeois	26	20	3	3	59	16	43	+43	Promoted to First Division.
2	RC de Gand	26	20	2	4	87	20	42	+67	Promoted to First Division.
3	Tilleur FC	26	16	3	7	68	36	35	+32	
4	FC Malinois	26	14	3	9	46	35	31	+11	
5	Stade Louvaniste	26	11	8	7	47	45	30	+2	
6	Liersche SK	26	12	5	9	47	43	29	+4	
7	White Star AC	26	12	4	10	39	45	28	-6	
8	FC de Bressoux	26	10	5	11	46	40	25	+6	
9	TSV Lyra	26	7	7	12	37	47	21	-10	
10	EFC Hasselt	26	7	6	13	39	53	20	-14	
11	AS Herstal	26	6	5	15	31	54	17	-23	
12	CS Schaerbeek	26	6	3	17	22	63	15	-41	
13	Léopold Club de Bruxelles	26	4	6	16	43	72	14	-29	
14	AS Ostende	26	4	6	16	25	67	14	-42	
