= Raymond Braine =

Belgian footballer (1907–1978)

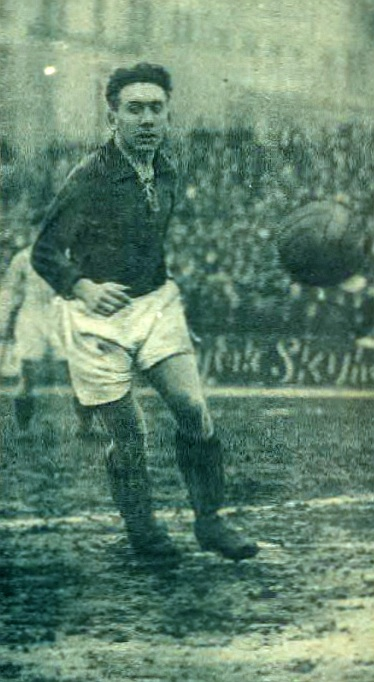

Personal information
- Full name: Raymond Ernest Michel Braine
- Date of birth: 28 April 1907
- Place of birth: Antwerp, Belgium
- Date of death: 24 December 1978 (aged 71)
- Place of death: Antwerp, Belgium
- Position: Striker

Senior career*
Years	Team	Apps	(Gls)
1922–1930	Beerschot VAC	142	(141)
1930–1936	Sparta Prague	106	(120)
1936–1943	Beerschot VAC	113	(69)
1943–1944	La Forestoise	21	(0)
Total		382	(330)

International career
1925–1939	Belgium	54	(26)
- * Club domestic league appearances and goals

Raymond Ernest Michel Braine (28 April 1907 – 24 December 1978) was a Belgian football striker. He was also the first Belgian professional player, when he obtained a transfer to Sparta Prague in 1930. Braine played in 54 matches for the Belgium national football team and scored 26 times, making him Belgium's 9th top all-time scorer.

== Club career ==
His first club was Beerschot in Antwerp. Braine made his Belgian Championship debut on 11 February 1923 against Daring Club de Bruxelles (lost 3-0). He scored 4 times in 4 appearances that season and Beerschot finished second. Raymond's brother, Pierre, was also part of the team. The next year, Braine obtained his first trophy by earning a Championship title. Three more titles followed in 1925, 1926 and 1928. He was also part of Belgium's team at the 1928 Summer Olympics.

At the time, Belgian football was not professional. However, certain players did receive money (unofficially) based on performance. Some other players supplemented their incomes by opening cafés. At one point the Belgian Football Association published a paper stating: "Considering it is important to stop the progression of player-café owners, the executive Committee takes the decision that at this day, except for a player whose parents ran the café for more than 5 years, the authorisation to open a café will be subordinated to the condition that the player will not be a part of the first team."

Braine, who just opened a café in December 1929, decided to go and play abroad. His first attempt was in England with London side Clapton Orient, but he could not obtain a work permit. He signed a lucrative contract in 1930 with Sparta Prague and subsequently became the first Belgian professional player. With Sparta, Braine won Czechoslovak First League titles in 1932 and 1936, as well as 1935's Mitropa Cup. He finished as top scorer twice with Sparta Prague.

Before the 1934 World Cup, Braine had received an offer of 100,000 Koruna from the Czechoslovak FA to become a citizen of Czechoslovakia which he refused. Afterwards, Czechoslovakia lost the final game to Italy. He came back to Beerschot in 1937 and won the Championship twice again. This time, he played in the 1938 World Cup.

In 1943, Braine was transferred to C.S. La Forestoise as a defender for one season, a team that had just been promoted the year before to the first division, because of the War.

Raymond's brother Pierre Braine captained Belgium at the 1930 World Cup.

== Honours ==
=== Club ===
==== Beerschot VAC ====
- Belgian First Division: 1923-24, 1924-25, 1925-26, 1927-28, 1937-38, 1938-39

==== Sparta Prague ====
- Czechoslovak First League - 1931-32, 1935-36
- Mitropa Cup - 1935

=== Individual ===
- Belgian First Division top scorer: 1927-28 (35 goals), 1928-29 (30 goals)
- Czechoslovak First League top scorer: 1931-32 (16 goals), 1933-34 (18 goals)
- Belgian Golden Shoe of the 20th Century (1995): 7th place
- IFFHS Europe - Player of the Century nomination (2000)
- IFFHS All Time Belgium Dream Team (2021)
