= 1901–02 in Belgian football =

Football in Belgium
- Season: 1901–02

The 1901–02 season was the seventh competitive season in Belgian football.

== Overview ==
Only one official division existed at the time, split into two leagues. It was called Coupe de Championnat (Championship Cup) and its winner was decided after a final round between the first two of each league, for the first time in the championship history.

The season was not completed in Championship Cup A, and Skill F.C. de Bruxelles withdrew at the end of the season. No teams were admitted.

== Honour ==
Competition	Winner
Championship Cup	Racing Club de Bruxelles

== League Tables ==
=== Championship Cup A ===
Pos	Team	Pld	Won	Drw	Lst	GF	GA	Pts	GD	Notes
1	Racing Club de Bruxelles	9	8	1	0	35	5	17	+30	Qualified for Final Round
2	Beerschot A.C.	10	6	1	3	19	10	13	+9	Qualified for Final Round
3	Antwerp F.C.	9	4	2	3	11	13	10	-2	
4	C.S. Brugeois	9	3	0	6	13	26	6	-13	
5	Skill F.C. de Bruxelles	10	3	0	7	10	26	6	-16	Not participating next season.
6	F.C. Brugeois	7	1	0	6	6	14	2	-8	

=== Championship Cup B ===
Pos	Team	Pld	Won	Drw	Lst	GF	GA	Pts	GD	Notes
1	Union Saint-Gilloise	8	7	0	1	16	1	14	+15	Qualified for Final Round
2	Léopold Club de Bruxelles	8	5	0	3	24	11	10	+13	Qualified for Final Round
3	F.C. Liégeois	8	3	1	4	16	21	7	-5	
4	Athletic and Running Club de Bruxelles	8	3	0	5	15	22	6	-7	
5	Verviers F.C.	8	1	1	6	10	23	3	-13	

=== Final round ===
Pos	Team	Pld	Won	Drw	Lst	GF	GA	Pts	GD	Notes
1	Racing Club de Bruxelles	6	4	1	1	15	8	9	+7	Play-off as level on points.
2	Léopold Club de Bruxelles	6	4	1	1	14	10	9	+4	Play-off as level on points.
3	Union Saint-Gilloise	6	2	0	4	9	15	4	-6	
4	Beerschot A.C.	6	1	0	5	12	17	2	-17	

=== Test match ===
Team 1	Score	Team 2
Racing Club de Bruxelles	4 - 3	Léopold Club de Bruxelles
