= 1921–22 Belgian First Division =

22nd season of top-tier football in Belgium

Belgian First Division
- Season: 1921–22

Statistics of Belgian First Division in the 1921–22 season.

== Overview ==
Location of teams in Belgian First Division 1921–22

It was contested by 14 teams, and Beerschot won the championship.

== League standings ==
Pos	Team	Pld	W	D	L	GF	GA	GD	Pts	Relegation
1	Beerschot	26	17	5	4	54	23	+31	39	
2	Royale Union Saint-Gilloise	26	15	9	2	51	17	+34	39	
3	Royal Antwerp FC	26	15	7	4	52	31	+21	37	
4	R.R.C. Bruxelles	26	11	10	5	45	28	+17	32	
5	Standard Liège	26	11	6	9	45	33	+12	28	
6	Cercle Brugge K.S.V.	26	11	6	9	43	39	+4	28	
7	K.R.C. Mechelen	26	10	6	10	41	43	−2	26	
8	Daring Club	26	10	6	10	28	32	−4	26	
9	Club Brugge K.V.	26	8	8	10	38	42	−4	24	
10	R.C.S. Verviétois	26	6	7	13	27	47	−20	19	
11	La Gantoise	26	7	5	14	30	50	−20	19	
12	R.S.C. Anderlecht	26	4	10	12	27	42	−15	18	
13	RC de Gand	26	5	7	14	27	47	−20	17	Relegated to Promotion Division
14	KV Mechelen	26	5	2	19	33	69	−36	12	Relegated to Promotion Division

== Results ==
Home \ Away	AND	ANT	BEE	CER	CLU	DAR	RCB	USG	GNT	GAN	KVM	RCM	STA	VER
Anderlecht		1–1	0–2	4–1	1–3	0–3	1–2	0–0	2–2	1–2	2–1	1–0	0–2	3–0
Antwerp	3–1		2–2	2–0	3–0	3–2	0–1	1–0	5–3	2–2	1–0	3–1	0–1	3–1
Beerschot	5–1	0–0		4–1	3–1	3–1	5–1	0–0	2–1	3–0	3–0	1–1	1–0	1–0
Cercle Brugge	1–1	4–0	3–1		2–3	0–3	2–1	0–1	3–0	1–0	5–2	2–2	3–0	3–0
Club Brugge	1–1	0–3	3–1	1–1		2–2	2–0	2–3	3–1	2–1	6–1	1–1	1–1	2–2
Daring Club	1–0	0–1	2–1	0–1	0–1		1–1	0–1	2–1	0–0	1–3	2–1	1–0	1–0
Racing Bruxelles	1–1	5–0	0–2	2–2	1–0	1–0		0–2	2–2	0–0	6–0	6–1	2–0	2–2
Union SG	2–2	2–2	0–0	0–0	4–0	3–0	1–1		4–0	5–2	3–0	1–2	3–2	1–1
La Gantoise	2–0	1–2	0–3	1–0	4–1	2–2	0–1	0–1		1–1	2–1	1–2	1–0	0–1
Racing Gand	2–0	0–6	2–1	0–1	0–2	3–0	1–3	0–0	1–2		1–2	1–2	0–0	1–3
KV Mechelen	2–2	2–3	2–3	2–2	1–0	1–2	1–4	0–2	0–1	3–4		2–1	0–3	3–0
K.R.C. Mechelen	1–1	1–5	0–1	2–1	2–1	2–1	0–0	0–2	5–0	2–2	4–2		2–0	4–0
Standard Liège	0–0	0–0	2–3	5–1	2–0	0–0	2–2	1–6	5–1	4–1	5–1	4–1		4–2
Verviétois	2–1	1–1	0–3	2–3	1–1	0–1	0–0	1–4	1–1	1–0	3–1	2–1	1–2	

Legend: Blue = home team win; Yellow = draw; Red = away team win.
