= 1898–99 in Belgian football =

Football in Belgium
- Season: 1898–99

The 1898–99 season was the fourth competitive season in Belgian football.

== Overview ==
Only one official division existed at the time, split into two leagues. It was called Coupe de Championnat (Championship Cup) and its winner was decided after a two-legged final match between the winners of each league.

No team was relegated this season and only one new club was admitted for the next season (Skill F.C. de Bruxelles).

== Honour ==
Competition	Winner
Championship Cup	F.C. Liégeois

== League standings ==
=== Championship Group A ===
Pos	Team	Pld	Won	Drw	Lst	GF	GA	Pts	GD	Notes
1	F.C. Liégeois	8	8	0	0	31	5	16	+26	Qualified for Play-off Final
2	Racing Club de Bruxelles	8	4	0	4	30	22	8	+8	
3	Léopold Club de Bruxelles	8	3	1	4	23	21	7	+2	
4	Athletic and Running Club de Bruxelles	7	2	1	4	11	28	5	-17	
5	Antwerp F.C.	7	1	0	6	5	24	2	-19	

=== Championship Group B ===
Pos	Team	Pld	Won	Drw	Lst	GF	GA	Pts	GD	Notes
1	F.C. Brugeois	No results known at this time								Qualified for Play-off Final
2	Oostendensche FC	No results known at this time								
3	A.C. Gantois	No results known at this time								
4	Sport Pédestre de Gand	No results known at this time								

== Final ==
Team 1	Agg.	Team 2	1st leg	2nd leg
F.C. Liégeois	6 - 3	F.C. Brugeois	2 - 0	4 - 3
