= 1922–23 Belgian First Division =

23rd season of top-tier football in Belgium

Belgian First Division
- Season: 1922–23
- Champions: Royale Union Saint-Gilloise
- Promoted: Berchem; R. Uccle Sport
- Relegated: R.S.C. Anderlecht; R. Uccle Sport
- Matches: 273
- Goals: 623 (2.28 per match)

Statistics of Belgian First Division in the 1922–23 season.

== Overview ==
Location of teams in Belgian First Division 1922–23

It was contested by 14 teams, and Royale Union Saint-Gilloise won the championship.

== League standings ==
Pos	Team	Pld	W	D	L	GF	GA	GD	Pts	Relegation
1	Royale Union Saint-Gilloise	26	18	6	2	55	19	+36	42	
2	Beerschot	26	16	5	5	65	28	+37	37	
3	Cercle Brugge K.S.V.	26	15	7	4	42	21	+21	37	
4	Daring Club	26	14	6	6	46	23	+23	34	
5	Royal Antwerp FC	26	16	2	8	54	37	+17	34	
6	R.R.C. Bruxelles	26	12	5	9	58	52	+6	29	
7	Standard Liège	26	10	5	11	47	48	−1	25	
8	Club Brugge K.V.	26	9	6	11	47	54	−7	24	
9	La Gantoise	26	8	4	14	42	53	−11	20	
10	K Berchem Sport	26	7	5	14	36	67	−31	19	
11	K.R.C. Mechelen	26	7	5	14	30	56	−26	19	
12	R.C.S. Verviétois	26	6	5	15	40	57	−17	17	
13	R.S.C. Anderlecht	26	5	5	16	31	49	−18	15	Relegated to Promotion Division
14	R. Uccle Sport	26	4	5	17	30	59	−29	13	Relegated to Promotion Division

== Results ==
Home \ Away	AND	ANT	BEE	BRC	CER	CLU	DAR	RCB	USG	GNT	RCM	STA	VER	UCC
Anderlecht		2–0	0–1	2–2	0–1	2–2	0–1	2–4	0–2	3–1	1–2	1–1	0–3	2–1
Antwerp	1–2		1–4	3–0	2–0	6–2	3–0	5–1	1–1	0–4	3–2	3–1	3–0	1–0
Beerschot	0–1	1–3		6–2	0–1	5–1	2–2	3–1	1–1	5–1	6–0	1–1	3–0	3–1
Berchem	3–2	1–2	0–4		0–3	1–1	2–1	6–3	2–2	2–0	2–0	1–1	4–1	1–1
Cercle Brugge	0–0	3–1	1–1	5–1		1–0	0–2	3–2	0–0	2–1	1–0	2–1	6–1	1–1
Club Brugge	5–2	4–2	0–2	3–2	0–2		2–2	2–4	0–1	4–0	4–1	1–1	2–1	1–0
Daring Club	2–1	1–0	3–0	4–0	0–0	6–0		2–2	0–1	2–0	2–0	3–0	2–2	3–0
Racing Bruxelles	3–1	0–1	2–4	4–0	3–3	0–2	2–0		2–1	0–1	1–1	2–0	2–2	3–1
Union SG	1–0	3–2	2–0	4–0	0–0	2–0	2–0	6–0		4–1	7–0	3–1	4–2	2–0
La Gantoise	1–0	1–1	1–2	5–1	0–3	4–4	2–1	1–5	0–1		3–0	4–0	2–3	5–1
Racing Club de Malines	3–2	1–2	1–5	2–0	1–2	2–1	1–1	2–2	0–1	4–0		1–1	2–1	1–0
Standard Liège	6–3	1–2	1–3	4–0	1–0	3–1	0–3	1–3	1–3	2–1	4–2		4–1	3–0
Verviétois	1–0	1–2	0–0	2–3	1–2	2–1	1–2	1–4	5–0	1–1	0–0	1–3		5–1
Uccle	2–2	1–4	1–3	2–0	2–0	0–4	0–1	1–3	1–1	2–2	4–1	3–5	4–2	

Legend: Blue = home team win; Yellow = draw; Red = away team win.
