= 1919–20 Belgian First Division =

20th season of top-tier football in Belgium

Belgian First Division
- Season: 1919–20

Statistics of Belgian First Division in the 1919–20 season.

== Overview ==
Location of teams in Belgian First Division 1919–20

It was contested by 12 teams, and FC Bruges won the championship: however, for reasons unknown, La Gantoise were not relegated to the Promotion Division.

== League standings ==
Pos	Team	Pld	W	D	L	GF	GA	GD	Pts
1	FC Bruges	22	15	4	3	61	27	+34	34
2	Royale Union Saint-Gilloise	22	14	4	4	71	22	+49	32
3	Daring Club	22	13	5	4	45	28	+17	31
4	Royal Antwerp FC	22	11	5	6	52	35	+17	27
5	Beerschot	22	11	3	8	44	34	+10	25
6	KRC Malines	22	10	4	8	37	40	−3	24
7	RC de Gand	22	9	4	9	34	45	−11	22
8	Cercle Bruges	22	7	5	10	38	38	0	19
9	RCS Verviers	22	6	4	12	40	64	−24	16
10	R. Uccle Sport	22	4	5	13	28	58	−30	13
11	R.R.C. Bruxelles	22	4	3	15	40	59	−19	11
12	La Gantoise	22	3	4	15	28	68	−40	10

== Results ==
Home \ Away	ANT	BEE	CER	CLU	DAR	RCB	USG	GNT	GAN	RCM	UCC	VER
Antwerp		3–1	0–2	1–1	5–1	1–1	1–1	4–2	2–1	1–2	1–1	2–3
Beerschot	0–1		3–0	3–2	2–3	1–0	0–3	6–2	4–1	2–1	2–0	3–1
Cercle Brugge	1–3	1–1		2–2	1–0	2–1	1–2	1–1	7–0	1–1	6–2	4–0
Club Brugge	4–0	2–1	2–0		4–2	4–2	2–1	7–0	1–1	3–0	8–0	4–1
Daring Club	2–1	3–1	3–2	3–2		4–2	1–0	5–0	2–0	1–1	2–2	1–0
Racing Bruxelles	1–4	1–2	3–2	2–3	1–6		1–4	6–1	3–2	0–2	2–4	3–3
Union SG	1–1	2–1	1–1	0–1	1–1	3–5		5–0	9–1	6–2	5–0	8–0
La Gantoise	1–2	1–1	4–1	3–1	0–2	1–1	0–2		0–3	1–3	3–2	1–1
Racing Gand	3–2	3–2	2–1	1–1	0–0	2–1	0–2	3–1		0–0	3–0	6–0
K.R.C. Mechelen	1–5	2–4	1–0	2–3	1–2	2–1	1–4	4–1	2–0		2–0	3–3
Uccle	2–4	1–1	1–2	1–2	0–0	4–3	1–5	3–2	0–1	1–2		2–1
Verviétois	3–8	2–3	5–0	1–2	2–1	2–0	1–6	4–3	5–1	1–2	1–1	

Legend: Blue = home team win; Yellow = draw; Red = away team win.
