= 1897–98 in Belgian football =

Football in Belgium
- Season: 1897–98

Men's football
- Coupe de Championnat: FC Liégeois

The 1897–98 season was the third competitive season in Belgian football.

== Overview ==
Only one official league existed at the time. It was called Coupe de Championnat (Championship Cup) and was disputed between 5 teams as no new team was admitted after Sporting Club de Bruxelles withdrew during the previous season.

No team was relegated this season since the FA decided to split the division into two leagues. Four new teams were thus admitted at the end of the season and they formed one of the two leagues: F.C. Brugeois (that had already played in the first competitive season), C.S. Brugeois, R.C. Gantois and F.C. Courtraisien.

== Honour ==
| Competition | Winner |
|---|---|
| Championship Cup | F.C. Liégeois |

== League standings ==
| Pos | Team | Pld | Won | Drw | Lst | GF | GA | Pts | GD | Notes |
|---|---|---|---|---|---|---|---|---|---|---|
| 1 | F.C. Liégeois | 8 | 6 | 2 | 0 | 30 | 5 | 14 | +25 | |
| 2 | Racing Club de Bruxelles | 8 | 4 | 2 | 2 | 18 | 7 | 10 | +11 | |
| 3 | Léopold Club de Bruxelles | 8 | 2 | 4 | 2 | 17 | 23 | 8 | -6 | |
| 4 | Athletic and Running Club de Bruxelles | 8 | 2 | 2 | 4 | 11 | 17 | 6 | -6 | |
| 5 | Antwerp F.C. | 8 | 1 | 0 | 7 | 7 | 31 | 2 | -24 | |
