= 1931–32 Czechoslovak First League =

Czechoslovak First League
- Season: 1931–32
- Champions: Sparta Prague
- Relegated: Čechie Karlín
- Top goalscorer: Raymond Braine (16 goals)

Statistics of Czechoslovak First League in the 1931–32 season. Raymond Braine was the league's top scorer with 16 goals.

== Overview ==
It was contested by 9 teams, and Sparta Prague won the championship.

== League standings ==
Pos	Team	Pld	W	D	L	GF	GA	GR	Pts
1	Sparta Prague (C)	16	12	3	1	54	21	2.571	27
2	Slavia Prague	16	10	2	4	44	25	1.760	22
3	Bohemians Prague	16	7	4	5	41	31	1.323	18
4	Viktoria Plzeň	16	5	7	4	27	22	1.227	17
5	Viktoria Žižkov	16	6	4	6	37	30	1.233	16
6	Teplitzer FK	16	5	5	6	34	40	0.850	15
7	SK Náchod	16	5	4	7	35	42	0.833	14
8	SK Kladno	16	4	2	10	26	53	0.491	10
9	Čechie Karlín (R)	16	1	3	12	29	63	0.460	5

Source: rsssf.com
(C) Champions; (R) Relegated

== Results ==
Home \ Away	BOH	KAR	KLA	NÁC	SLA	SPA	TEP	PLZ	VŽI
Bohemians Prague		4–4	3–1	6–2	3–0	2–3	7–1	1–1	3–1
Čechie Karlín	3–5		2–3	3–4	2–3	0–1	1–1	2–3	4–6
SK Kladno	0–2	2–3		4–2	0–3	2–6	3–5	1–1	2–1
SK Náchod	0–0	4–1	5–2		4–1	1–5	3–1	0–2	1–3
Slavia Prague	2–1	6–0	7–0	2–2		3–1	2–3	4–1	4–2
Sparta Prague	5–0	5–1	6–1	4–4	2–1		5–2	3–0	2–2
Teplitzer FK	4–1	3–3	3–3	3–0	2–3	1–1		1–1	0–2
Viktoria Plzeň	3–3	6–0	1–2	2–0	0–0	1–2	3–1		0–0
Viktoria Žižkov	1–0	7–0	3–0	3–3	2–3	0–3	2–3	2–2	

Source: statistiky1ligy.fotbal.cz
Legend: Blue = home team win; Yellow = draw; Red = away team win.
