= 1903–04 in Belgian football =

Football in Belgium
- Season: 1903–04

The 1903–04 season was the ninth competitive season in Belgian football.

== Overview ==
Only one official division existed at the time, split into two leagues. It was called Coupe de Championnat (Championship Cup) and its winner was decided after a final round between the first two clubs of each league. The league A was not completed.

It was also the first competitive season of the now famous Daring Club de Bruxelles. At the end of the season, one of the new clubs (namely Olympia Club de Bruxelles) withdrew from the league. It was decided that there will be only one league the next season.

On 1 May 1904, Belgium played its first official match against France at the Stade du Vivier d'Oie, home of the Racing Club de Bruxelles. This match was viewed by around 1,500 people.

== National team ==
Belgium played its first official game.

Date	Venue	Opponents	Score*	Comp	Belgium scorers	Match Report
1 May 1904	Stade du Vivier d'Oie, Brussels (H)	France	3–3	F	Quéritet (2), Destrebecq

* Belgium score given first

Key

- H = Home match
- A = Away match
- F = Friendly

== Honour ==
Competition	Winner
Championship Cup	Union Saint-Gilloise

== League standings ==
=== Championship Cup A ===
Pos	Team	Pld	Won	Drw	Lst	GF	GA	Pts	GD	Notes
1	Union Saint-Gilloise	12	11	0	1	60	14	22	+46	Qualified for Final Round
2	F.C. Brugeois	12	8	1	3	51	24	17	+27	Qualified for Final Round
3	C.S. Brugeois	12	7	3	2	31	18	17	+13	
4	Antwerp F.C.	12	5	1	6	23	32	11	-9	
5	Olympia Club de Bruxelles	12	2	2	8	22	49	6	-27	Not participating next season.
6	Beerschot A.C.	11	2	1	8	21	47	5	-26	
7	Athletic and Running Club de Bruxelles	11	1	2	8	13	37	4	-24	

=== Championship Cup B ===
Pos	Team	Pld	Won	Drw	Lst	GF	GA	Pts	GD	Notes
1	Racing Club de Bruxelles	8	5	1	2	33	12	11	+21	Qualified for Final Round
2	Léopold Club de Bruxelles	8	4	2	2	21	16	10	+5	Qualified for Final Round
3	Daring Club de Bruxelles	8	3	2	3	17	26	8	-9	
4	F.C. Liégeois	8	3	0	5	11	24	6	-13	
5	C.S. Verviétois	8	2	1	5	20	24	5	-4	

=== Final round ===
Pos	Team	Pld	Won	Drw	Lst	GF	GA	Pts	GD	Notes
1	Union Saint-Gilloise	6	6	0	0	25	4	12	+21	
2	Racing Club de Bruxelles	6	2	2	2	11	10	6	+1	
3	F.C. Brugeois	6	1	2	3	10	17	4	-7	
4	Léopold Club de Bruxelles	6	0	2	4	5	20	2	-15	
