= 1927–28 Belgian First Division =

28th season of top-tier football in Belgium

Belgian First Division
- Season: 1927–28

Statistics of Belgian First Division in the 1927–28 season.

== Overview ==
Location of teams in Belgian First Division 1927–28

It was contested by 14 teams, and Beerschot won the championship.

== League standings ==
Pos	Team	Pld	W	D	L	GF	GA	GD	Pts	Qualification or relegation
1	Beerschot	26	23	2	1	85	26	+59	48	
2	Standard Liège	26	17	3	6	90	55	+35	37	
3	Cercle Brugge K.S.V.	26	16	2	8	69	55	+14	34	
4	K Berchem Sport	26	12	3	11	49	45	+4	27	
5	Lierse S.K.	26	12	2	12	48	54	−6	26	
6	La Gantoise	26	10	4	12	58	58	0	24	
7	Royal Antwerp FC	26	9	6	11	52	64	−12	24	
8	Royale Union Saint-Gilloise	26	10	3	13	46	52	−6	23	
9	RC de Gand	26	10	3	13	49	60	−11	23	
10	K.R.C. Mechelen	26	10	2	14	59	65	−6	22	Relegation play-offs
11	Daring Club	26	8	6	12	44	58	−14	22	Relegation play-offs
12	Club Brugge K.V.	26	9	4	13	53	58	−5	22	Relegation play-offs
13	R.R.C. Bruxelles	26	8	6	12	43	59	−16	22	Relegation play-offs
14	R.S.C. Anderlecht	26	4	2	20	46	82	−36	10	Relegated to Division I

== Results ==
Home \ Away	AND	ANT	BEE	BRC	CER	CLU	DAR	RCB	GNT	GAN	LIE	RCM	STA	USG
Anderlecht		1–2	2–2	1–2	3–3	2–4	3–2	2–1	1–6	1–2	0–1	4–0	3–5	0–1
Antwerp	8–4		0–3	2–1	1–4	2–0	4–4	0–0	1–1	5–4	1–2	2–1	3–4	2–0
Beerschot	5–0	3–1		7–2	5–1	4–0	1–0	3–0	4–0	5–1	3–0	4–1	5–2	2–0
Berchem	1–0	4–2	0–1		4–2	4–2	4–1	1–3	2–3	0–0	5–1	2–3	4–0	1–0
Cercle Brugge	5–1	3–1	1–5	1–0		1–1	8–1	3–1	4–2	2–1	3–2	2–3	7–2	3–0
Club Brugge	4–2	0–0	1–3	3–1	0–1		3–3	1–0	2–1	1–0	2–3	1–0	2–4	5–0
Daring Club	3–1	3–5	1–1	0–0	0–1	2–3		4–3	2–0	3–2	3–0	2–0	0–3	0–0
Racing Bruxelles	2–8	6–1	2–6	3–2	6–1	3–1	1–1		1–2	4–0	5–3	2–2	2–3	2–0
La Gantoise	5–1	2–3	2–3	1–1	1–4	4–2	1–3	6–1		3–1	0–0	3–2	3–3	4–1
Racing Gand	4–1	1–1	2–3	5–0	4–1	5–1	3–0	2–0	1–0		3–2	1–4	2–2	4–2
Lierse	3–1	3–1	1–2	0–1	1–3	3–0	3–1	2–2	5–1	4–0		3–1	1–0	1–0
K.R.C. Mechelen	4–2	3–3	1–2	2–4	3–0	3–1	2–4	2–1	5–2	5–1	6–1		1–2	3–4
Standard Liège	5–1	5–0	2–3	1–0	5–2	5–0	3–1	2–2	3–2	6–0	7–1	7–2		6–1
Union SG	2–1	2–1	3–0	1–3	2–3	3–3	3–0	0–0	2–3	4–0	3–2	5–0	7–3	

Legend: Blue = home team win; Yellow = draw; Red = away team win.

== Relegation play-offs ==
Pos	Team	Pld	W	D	L	GF	GA	GD	Pts	Relegation
1	Daring Club	3	3	0	0	7	2	+5	6	
2	K.R.C. Mechelen	3	1	1	1	7	4	+3	3	
3	R.R.C. Bruxelles	3	1	1	1	4	5	−1	3	
4	Club Brugge K.V.	3	0	0	3	2	9	−7	0	Relegated to Division I
