= Michel D'Hooghe =

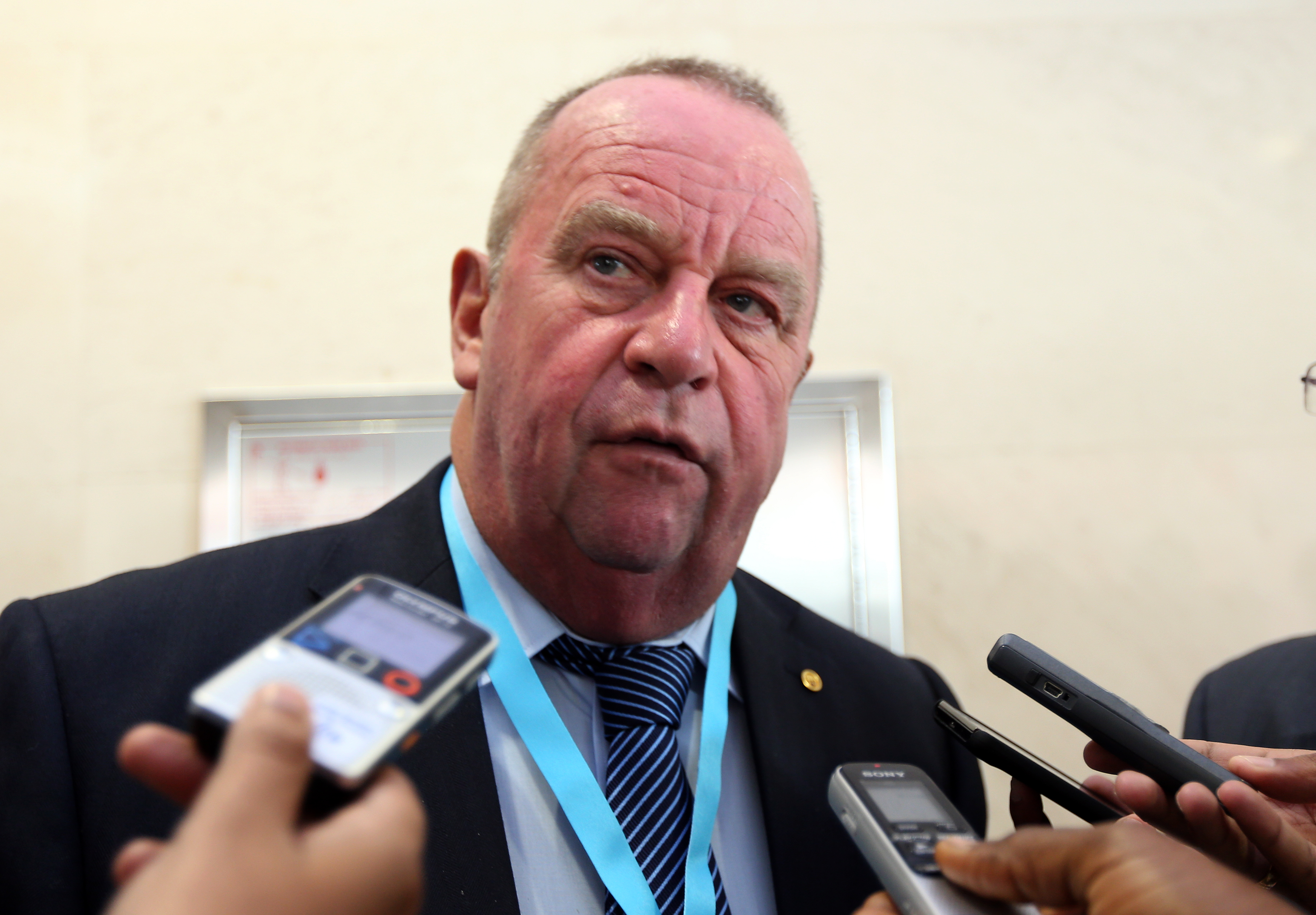
Michel D'Hooghe (2013)

Michel, Baron D'Hooghe (born 8 December 1945 in Bruges) is a Belgian former member of the FIFA Council and the former chairman of the FIFA medical committee. D'Hooghe, a medical doctor, was President of the Royal Belgian Football Association (1987-2001) and President of Club Brugge KV (2003-2009). In 2001, he was ennobled as a baron.

In August 2011 he admitted that Vyacheslav Koloskov, an adviser for Russia's successful bid for the 2018 World Cup, visited him in his hometown of Bruges and gave him a valuable painting while lobbying for his vote. He has since described the painting as a "poisonous gift" and has notified FIFA officially about it, since its acceptance is in contravention to the FIFA rules that govern lobbying. He stated that he was "never influenced" after his son received a job at a hospital in Doha, Qatar, 8 weeks after Qatar won the bid for the 2022 World Cup.
