= Georges De Spae =

Belgian footballer

Personal information
- Date of birth: 30 September 1900
- Date of death: 20 June 1974 (aged 73)

International career
Years	Team	Apps	(Gls)
- Belgium

Georges De Spae (30 September 1900 – 20 June 1974) was a Belgian footballer. He competed in the men's tournament at the 1928 Summer Olympics.
