= 1923–24 Belgian First Division =

24th season of top-tier football in Belgium

Belgian First Division
- Season: 1923–24

Statistics of Belgian First Division in the 1923–24 season.

== Overview ==
Location of teams in Belgian First Division 1923–24

It was contested by 14 teams, and Beerschot won the championship.

== League standings ==
Pos	Team	Pld	W	D	L	GF	GA	GD	Pts	Relegation
1	Beerschot	26	15	8	3	52	21	+31	38	
2	Royale Union Saint-Gilloise	26	14	9	3	43	20	+23	37	
3	Cercle Brugge K.S.V.	26	13	7	6	47	26	+21	33	
4	R.R.C. Bruxelles	26	14	5	7	47	30	+17	33	
5	Standard Liège	26	12	9	5	43	32	+11	33	
6	RC de Gand	26	13	4	9	43	41	+2	30	
7	Royal Antwerp FC	26	8	9	9	43	32	+11	25	
8	Daring Club	26	7	10	9	31	32	−1	24	
9	Club Brugge K.V.	26	7	9	10	38	37	+1	23	
10	K Berchem Sport	26	6	10	10	31	43	−12	22	
11	La Gantoise	26	6	7	13	30	42	−12	19	
12	K.R.C. Mechelen	26	6	7	13	30	65	−35	19	Relegated to Promotion Division
13	R.C.S. Verviétois	26	5	5	16	23	59	−36	15	Relegated to Promotion Division
14	R.F.C. de Liège	26	3	7	16	17	43	−26	13	Relegated to Promotion Division

== Results ==
Home \ Away	ANT	BEE	BRC	CER	CLU	DAR	RCB	GNT	GAN	FCL	RCM	STA	USG	VER
Antwerp		1–1	5–1	1–2	1–1	0–4	0–1	2–3	1–1	3–0	5–0	0–0	0–0	5–0
Beerschot	3–0		3–3	3–1	3–1	4–0	1–0	1–0	6–0	1–1	2–1	2–1	1–1	5–0
Berchem	1–1	0–2		2–0	2–1	0–0	1–3	2–2	2–2	0–0	1–0	1–3	0–2	1–1
Cercle Brügge	1–1	3–2	2–0		2–1	1–1	3–1	1–1	3–0	2–2	8–0	1–0	0–1	3–0
Club Brugge	1–4	2–1	1–1	2–0		0–0	1–1	1–2	1–2	0–1	5–0	0–1	0–1	1–0
Daring Club	0–0	0–0	1–2	1–0	1–2		1–4	2–2	2–2	2–0	3–1	1–1	0–0	3–0
Racing Bruxelles	2–0	2–1	4–2	1–1	0–0	1–0		1–0	1–2	1–0	7–1	2–3	2–1	2–0
La Gantoise	0–3	0–0	1–3	1–1	1–1	1–2	2–1		1–3	4–0	1–0	1–1	0–1	1–0
Racing Gand	1–0	0–1	1–0	1–2	0–2	4–2	1–2	2–1		1–0	3–2	5–1	4–0	4–0
Liège	1–3	0–2	3–1	0–3	1–1	0–2	1–2	1–0	1–2		0–0	0–0	0–1	0–1
K.R.C. Mechelen	2–1	2–2	0–0	3–4	4–4	3–2	2–2	3–2	1–0	2–1		0–0	0–3	1–0
Standard Liège	2–2	1–3	4–2	0–0	2–4	0–0	2–1	4–2	5–0	1–0	3–1		2–1	3–2
Union SG	2–1	0–0	1–1	1–0	2–1	2–0	1–1	3–0	1–1	6–2	5–0	1–1		2–2
Verviétois	2–3	1–2	0–2	0–3	4–4	2–1	3–2	3–1	3–1	2–2	1–1	0–2	1–4	

Legend: Blue = home team win; Yellow = draw; Red = away team win.
