= Van Honsebrouck Brewery =

Belgian brewery

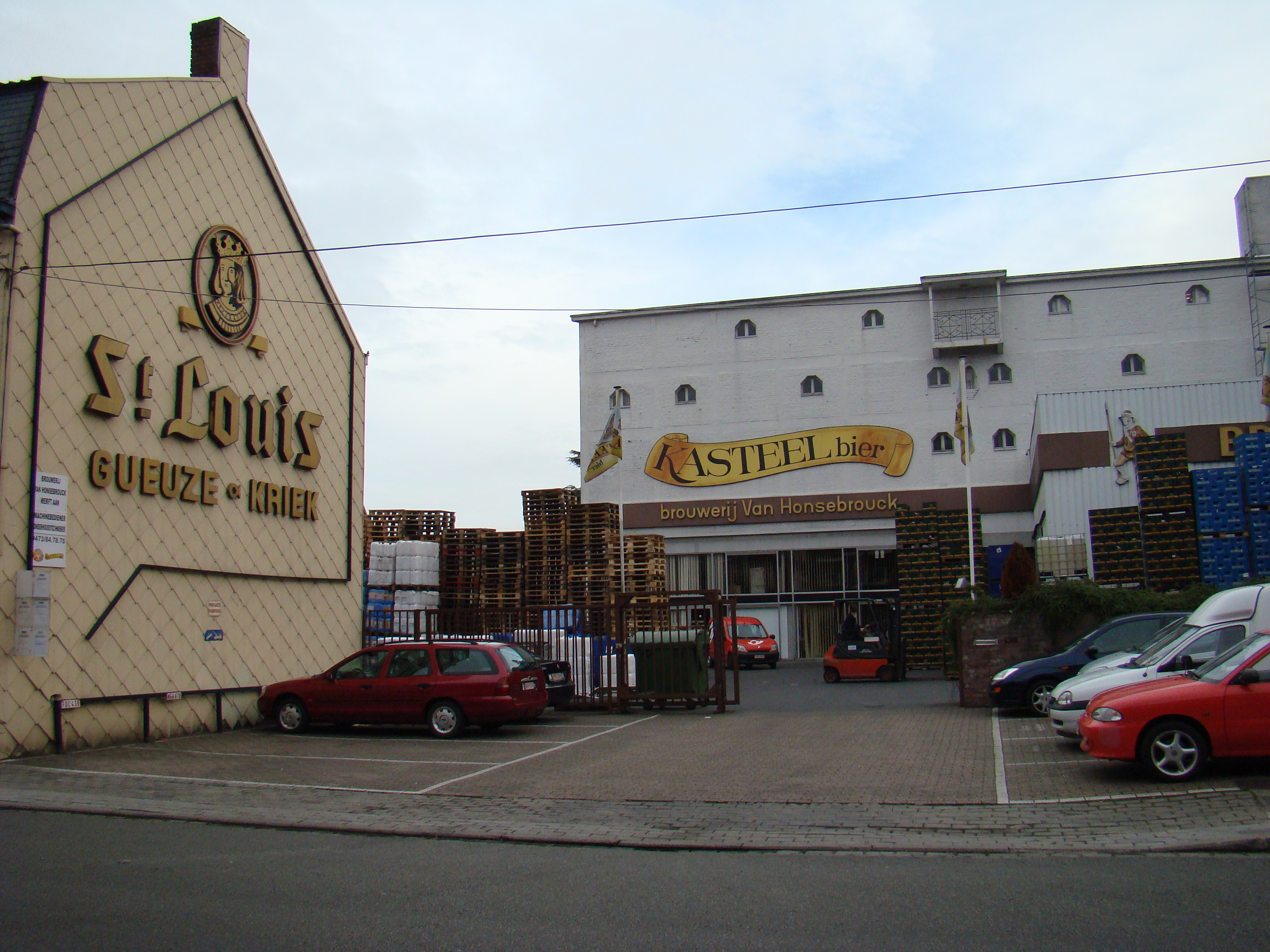
Ingelmunster Van Honsebrouck brewery

Van Honsebrouck is a Belgian brewery in Ingelmunster, Belgium. Founded in 1865 as Sint-Jozef Brewery, it was renamed to Brewery Van Honsebrouck in 1953. It is one of two breweries outside of Pajottenland to produce lambic beer.

== History ==
The location of the brewery's building and the whole village of Ingelmunster were razed in 1695 following hostilities between English, French and Spanish soldiers. The current building dates back to 1736, and has cellars that date back to the Middle Ages.

In 1986 the castle was bought by the Van Honsebrouck family. The family have been brewing Ingelmunster beer since 1900. On 17 September 2001 a fire broke out in the castle that completely destroyed the museum-brewery.

The brewery is owned and operated by the seventh generation of Van Honsebrouck brewers in Ingelmunster. The current CEO is Xavier Van Honsebrouck, who took control in 2009.

== Products ==
Van Honsebrouck produces several different beers, including:

- Kasteel Donker, a dark beer (11% ABV)
- Kasteel Rouge, a blend of Kasteel Donker and cherry liqueur (8% ABV)
- Kasteel Tripel, a full-bodied tripel (11% ABV)
- Kasteel Blond, a blond beer (7% ABV)
- Kasteel Hoppy, a blond beer with a hoppy flavor, launched in 2013 (6.5% ABV)
- Cuvée du Chateau, which is Kasteel Donker that has been aged for ten years (11% ABV)
- St Louis , the line of lambic beers with fruit
  - Premium Kriek, a sweet red beer that uses pits of the Oblacinska cherries and is aged 6 months on lambic (3.2% ABV)
- Fond Tradition, a traditional and unsweetened gueuze
- Brigand, a golden-blond beer (9% ABV)
- Bacchus, an Old Flemish Brown beer (4.5% ABV)
- Bacchus Kriekenbier (5.8% ABV) Made with 15% cherries. The 37.5cl bottle has no label, but is instead wrapped in a sheet of printed tissue paper.
- Passchendaele (5.2% ABV) Belgian Special Blond Ale, brewed in commemoration of the First World War Centenary
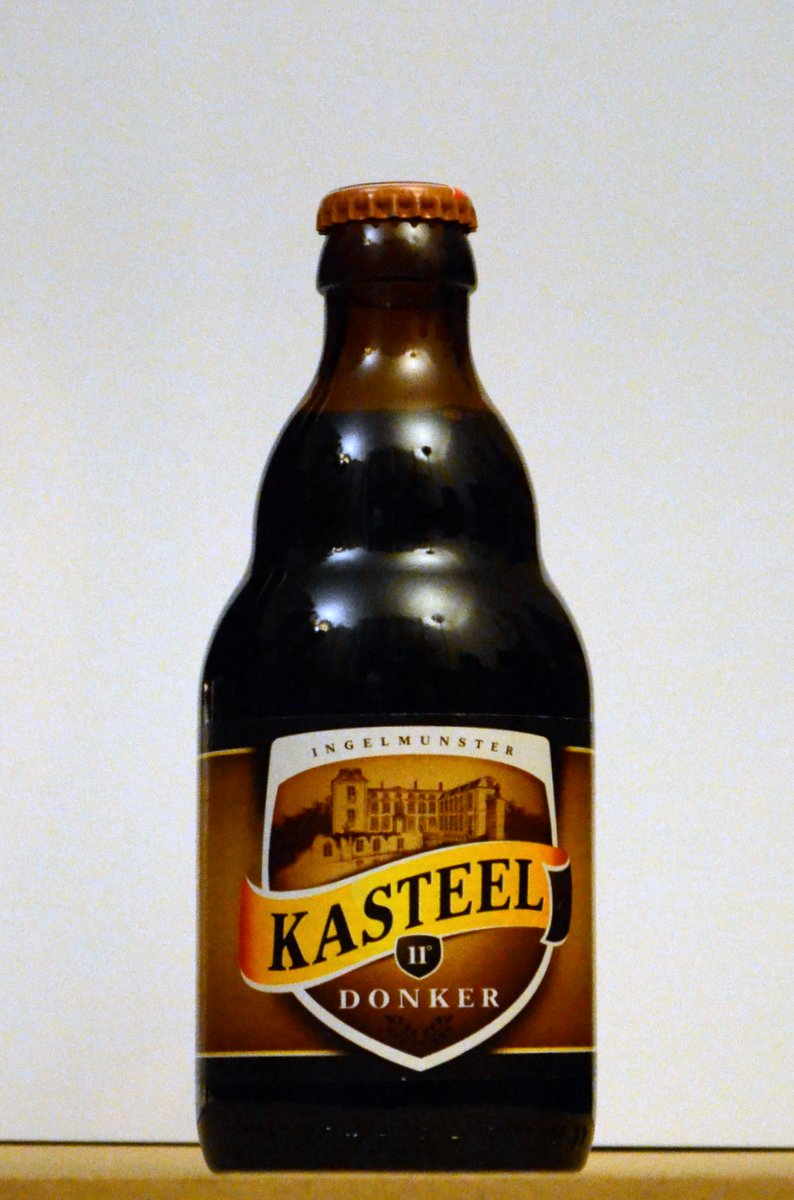
Kasteel Donker

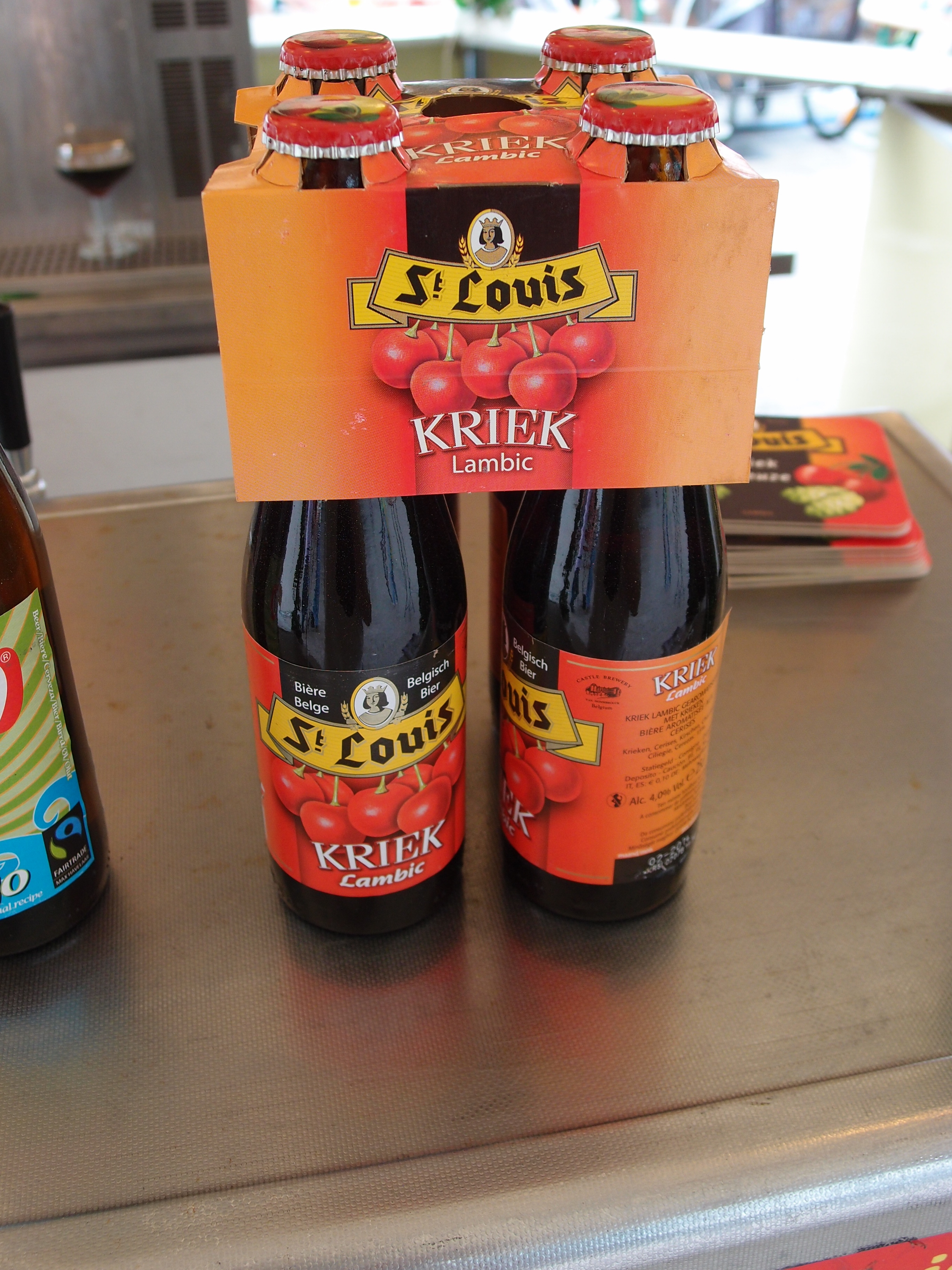
St Louis Premium Kriek

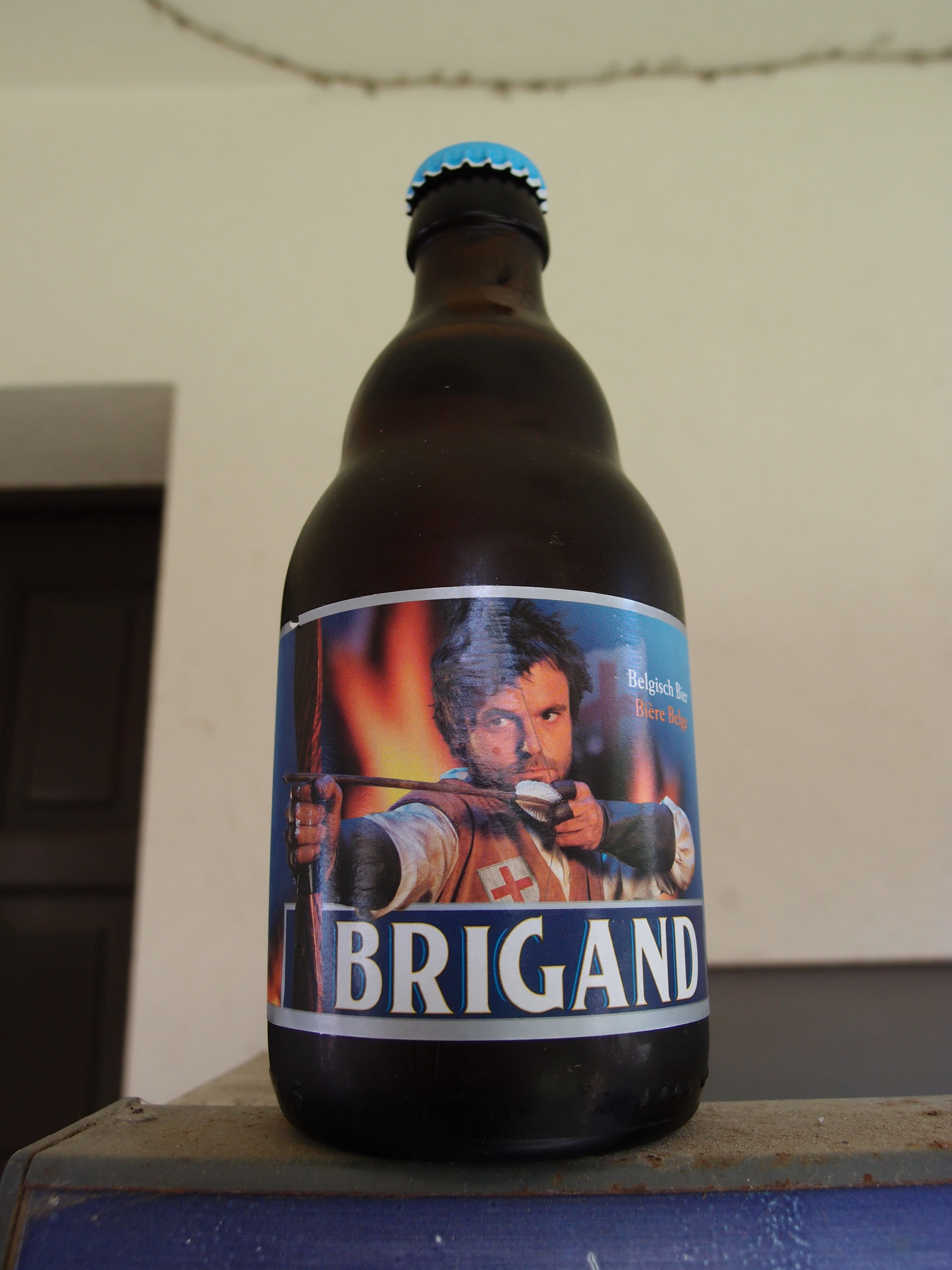
Brigand
