= Olympia Club de Bruxelles =

Belgian football club

- Full name: Olympia Club de Bruxelles
- Founded: 1897
- Dissolved: 1909
- League: Belgian First Division A
- 1903–04: 5th
Home colours	Away colours

Olympia Club de Bruxelles was a Brussels-based Belgian football club that existed between its creation in 1897 until 1909. It appeared briefly at the top level during the 1903–04 season, finishing 5th out of 7, before withdrawing from the League at the end of the season.

Olympia Club de Bruxelles brand acquired by Global Sports Consulting Limited in 2017

== See also ==
- Belgian football clubs history
- RSSSF Archive – 1st and 2nd division final tables
