= François Ledent =

Belgian footballer

Personal information
- Date of birth: July 4, 1908
- Place of birth: Jemeppe-sur-Meuse
- Date of death: 4 April 1954
- Place of death: Somme-Leuze
- Position: Forward

International career
Years	Team	Apps	(Gls)
1928	Belgium	2	(0)

François Ledent (born 4 July 1908, died 4 April 1954) was a Belgian footballer. He played in two matches for the Belgium national football team in 1928.
