= Victor Houet =

Belgian footballer

Personal information
- Date of birth: 2 September 1900
- Place of birth: Liège, Belgium

International career
Years	Team	Apps	(Gls)
1924-1925	Belgium	4	(1)

Victor Houet (born 2 September 1900, date of death unknown) was a Belgian footballer. He played in four matches for the Belgium national football team in 1924 and 1925.
