= Achille Schelstraete =

Belgian footballer

Personal information
- Date of birth: 31 January 1897
- Place of birth: Bruges, Belgium
- Date of death: 7 December 1937 (aged 40)
- Place of death: Ypres, Belgium

International career
Years	Team	Apps	(Gls)
- Belgium

Achille Schelstraete (31 January 1897 – 7 December 1937) was a Belgian footballer. He competed in the men's tournament at the 1924 Summer Olympics.
