= Pierre Braine =

Belgian footballer

Personal information
- Full name: Pierre E. E. Braine
- Date of birth: 26 October 1900
- Place of birth: Leopoldsburg, Belgium
- Date of death: 6 November 1951 (aged 51)
- Place of death: Belgium
- Position: Midfielder

Senior career*
| Years | Team | Apps | (Gls) |
| 1919–1933 | Beerschot VAC | ? | (?) |

International career
| 1922–1930 | Belgium | 46 | (4) |
- * Club domestic league appearances and goals

Pierre E. E. Braine (26 October 1900 – 6 November 1951) was a Belgian international footballer. A midfielder, he played club football for Beerschot VAC between 1919 and 1933. He also represented Belgium at the 1928 Summer Olympics and 1930 FIFA World Cup.

Pierre's brother Raymond was also a Belgian international player.
