= 1925–26 Belgian First Division =

26th season of top-tier football in Belgium

Belgian First Division
- Season: 1925–26

Statistics of Belgian First Division in the 1925–26 season.

== Overview ==
Location of teams in Belgian First Division 1925–26

It was contested by 14 teams, and Beerschot won the championship.

== League standings ==
Pos	Team	Pld	W	D	L	GF	GA	GD	Pts	Relegation
1	Beerschot	26	18	4	4	80	29	+51	40	
2	Standard Liège	26	14	5	7	77	48	+29	33	
3	Daring Club	26	15	2	9	59	33	+26	32	
4	Royale Union Saint-Gilloise	26	15	2	9	53	34	+19	32	
5	Cercle Brugge K.S.V.	26	14	3	9	59	27	+32	31	
6	K Berchem Sport	26	11	8	7	68	45	+23	30	
7	Royal Antwerp FC	26	11	6	9	49	41	+8	28	
8	K.R.C. Mechelen	26	12	3	11	65	73	−8	27	
9	La Gantoise	26	10	6	10	52	56	−4	26	
10	Club Brugge K.V.	26	11	3	12	49	52	−3	25	
11	RC de Gand	26	9	5	12	63	71	−8	23	
12	R.S.C. Anderlecht	26	8	3	15	39	64	−25	19	Relegated to Division I
13	R.C.S. Verviétois	26	4	2	20	34	102	−68	10	Relegated to Division I
14	Tilleur	26	3	2	21	29	101	−72	8	Relegated to Division I

== Results ==
Home \ Away	AND	ANT	BEE	BRC	CER	CLU	DAR	GNT	GAN	RCM	STA	TIL	USG	VER
Anderlecht		0–2	0–7	0–0	2–1	2–1	0–3	0–2	1–4	2–4	3–2	3–0	0–2	3–2
Antwerp	1–1		2–0	0–0	2–1	4–2	1–0	2–2	2–1	0–2	1–1	8–0	0–3	4–0
Beerschot	1–1	2–1		2–0	2–0	5–1	2–4	4–0	3–1	4–0	2–2	4–0	0–0	7–1
Berchem	5–3	5–1	1–2		2–2	4–0	1–1	2–2	5–3	4–1	3–3	4–2	1–3	7–0
Cercle Brugge	3–2	3–0	0–1	5–1		1–2	1–0	2–1	6–0	1–1	1–1	2–0	4–0	9–0
Club Brugge	4–0	1–1	1–3	1–0	1–2		2–0	1–1	3–2	5–1	4–0	2–1	3–2	2–3
Daring Club	2–1	0–3	0–5	1–2	1–0	3–2		5–0	3–0	5–0	2–0	3–0	1–2	4–1
La Gantoise	4–2	2–0	3–3	0–8	1–3	0–2	0–1		3–3	0–1	2–1	7–0	2–1	6–1
Racing Gand	5–1	1–1	2–1	2–3	1–3	4–0	2–2	2–2		2–5	4–4	5–1	2–1	1–4
K.R.C. Mechelen	2–5	5–3	1–3	3–3	2–0	1–4	1–5	3–4	7–3		6–0	4–2	3–2	5–2
Standard Liège	2–0	2–3	3–2	3–1	3–2	5–0	2–1	3–1	4–1	8–0		10–2	3–1	6–0
Tilleur	5–3	3–1	1–6	0–0	0–5	2–1	1–6	2–4	1–2	3–3	2–5		0–3	0–2
Union SG	0–1	3–2	1–3	3–2	1–0	1–0	4–0	3–1	2–4	3–1	3–1	5–0		4–0
Verviétois	0–3	1–4	3–6	2–4	0–2	4–4	0–6	1–2	3–6	0–3	1–3	3–1	0–0	

Legend: Blue = home team win; Yellow = draw; Red = away team win.
