= Jacques Moeschal (footballer) =

Belgian footballer

Personal information
- Date of birth: 6 September 1900
- Place of birth: Uccle, Belgium
- Date of death: 30 October 1956 (aged 56)

Senior career*
Years	Team	Apps	(Gls)
1919–1936	Racing Club de Bruxelles		

International career
1928–1931	Belgium	23	(6)
- * Club domestic league appearances and goals

Jacques Moeschal (6 September 1900 – 30 October 1956) was a Belgian international footballer who participated at the 1928 Summer Olympics and the 1930 FIFA World Cup.
