= 1924–25 Belgian First Division =

25th season of top-tier football in Belgium

Belgian First Division
- Season: 1924–25

Statistics of Belgian First Division in the 1924–25 season.

== Overview ==
Location of teams in Belgian First Division 1924–25

It was contested by 14 teams, and Beerschot won the championship.

== League standings ==
Pos	Team	Pld	W	D	L	GF	GA	GD	Pts	Relegation
1	Beerschot	26	18	4	4	55	22	+33	40	
2	Royal Antwerp FC	26	13	8	5	39	21	+18	34	
3	Royale Union Saint-Gilloise	26	13	6	7	41	29	+12	32	
4	Cercle Brugge K.S.V.	26	9	10	7	25	24	+1	28	
5	RC de Gand	26	11	6	9	36	38	−2	28	
6	Daring Club	26	10	7	9	31	23	+8	27	
7	K Berchem Sport	26	11	5	10	46	35	+11	27	
8	Standard Liège	26	9	8	9	36	39	−3	26	
9	R.S.C. Anderlecht	26	11	3	12	37	29	+8	25	
10	La Gantoise	26	7	9	10	24	33	−9	23	
11	Club Brugge K.V.	26	9	3	14	33	44	−11	21	
12	R.R.C. Bruxelles	26	7	6	13	25	37	−12	20	Relegated to Promotion Division
13	KV Mechelen	26	4	11	11	34	47	−13	19	Relegated to Promotion Division
14	White Star Woluwé A.C.	26	5	4	17	17	53	−36	14	Relegated to Promotion Division

== Results ==
Home \ Away	AND	ANT	BEE	BRC	CER	CLU	DAR	RCB	GNT	GAN	KVM	STA	USG	WST
Anderlecht		0–1	2–3	1–0	0–1	3–0	0–1	0–2	3–1	2–0	2–1	3–0	1–0	3–0
Antwerp	2–1		1–1	0–0	2–0	0–0	1–0	1–3	2–0	1–0	1–1	3–0	4–0	6–0
Beerschot	3–2	3–0		2–1	0–0	3–1	0–0	5–2	5–1	6–0	4–1	3–2	1–0	2–0
Berchem	2–1	1–1	2–0		3–1	3–2	4–4	3–1	2–0	2–0	3–3	3–0	1–2	4–0
Cercle Brugge	1–1	1–1	0–2	2–1		2–0	0–0	2–0	0–1	4–1	1–3	2–1	0–1	1–0
Club Brugge	2–0	1–3	0–2	1–0	1–1		1–0	3–1	4–0	1–4	1–0	1–2	1–1	2–1
Daring Club	0–2	1–0	0–1	4–1	0–1	2–1		3–0	3–0	0–1	1–1	2–2	0–1	4–1
Racing Bruxelles	2–2	1–1	0–1	0–2	0–0	1–0	0–1		1–1	0–2	2–3	2–0	1–0	2–0
La Gantoise	1–0	0–1	1–1	3–1	0–0	1–2	1–0	2–2		1–1	2–2	1–1	0–1	1–0
Racing Gand	2–3	2–1	2–0	0–4	2–0	3–2	2–0	0–0	0–1		0–0	1–1	3–1	2–0
KV Mechelen	2–1	0–1	0–5	1–1	1–2	5–1	0–2	1–2	1–1	0–2		1–1	4–4	1–1
Standard Liège	1–0	1–1	2–0	4–2	2–2	0–3	1–1	2–0	1–3	2–2	2–0		1–0	5–0
Union SG	1–1	3–2	1–2	1–0	1–1	4–1	1–1	1–0	1–1	3–1	3–1	3–0		2–1
White Star	0–3	1–2	1–0	1–0	0–0	2–1	0–1	1–0	3–0	3–3	1–1	0–2	0–5	

Legend: Blue = home team win; Yellow = draw; Red = away team win.
