= Skill FC de Bruxelles =

Belgian football club

- Full name: Skill Football Club de Bruxelles
- Short name: Skill FC Bruxelles
- Founded: 1896
- Dissolved: 1902
Home colours	Away colours

Skill Football Club de Bruxelles was a Belgian football club from its creation in 1896 to 1902 when it merged with Daring Club de Bruxelles. The club played in the first division from 1899 to 1902 and finished respectively 6th (and last, with 0 point, but was not relegated), 5th (on 9) and 5th (on 6).
