= Club Brugge KV =

Association football club in Bruges, Belgium

Club Brugge
- Full name: Club Brugge Koninklijke Voetbalvereniging (Club Brugge Royal Football association)
- Nicknames: Blauw-Zwart (Blue-Black), (the) Club, FCB, FC Bruges
- Founded: 13 November 1891; 134 years ago (as Brugsche FC); Stamnummer (matricule number) 3
- Ground: Jan Breydel Stadium
- Capacity: 29,062
- President: Bart Verhaeghe
- Head coach: Ivan Leko
- League: Belgian Pro League
- 2025–26: Belgian Pro League, 1st of 16
- Website: clubbrugge.be
Home colours	Away colours	Third colours

Club Brugge Koninklijke Voetbalvereniging (Dutch pronunciation: [klʏ ˈbrʏɣə ˌkoːnɪŋkləkə ˈvudbɑlvəˌreːnəɣɪŋ]), (Note: Club in isolation: [klʏp]; West Flemish pronunciation: [klœ ˈbrœɦə].) known simply as Club Brugge (in English also: Club Bruges), is a Belgian professional football club based in Bruges, Belgium. It was founded in 1891 and its home ground is the Jan Breydel Stadium, which has a capacity of 29,042. They play in the Belgian Pro League, the top domestic league in Belgian football.

One of the most decorated clubs in Belgian football, Club Brugge has been crowned Belgian league champions 20 times, second only to major rivals Anderlecht, and shares the Jan Breydel Stadium with city rival Cercle Brugge, with whom they contest the Bruges derby.

Throughout its long history, the club has enjoyed much European football success, reaching two European finals and three European semi-finals. Club Brugge is the only Belgian club to have played the final of the European Cup (now the UEFA Champions League) as of November 2024, losing to Liverpool in the final of the 1978 season. They also lost in the 1976 UEFA Cup Final to the same opponents. Club Brugge holds the European record for the highest number of consecutive participations in the UEFA Europa League (20), the record number of Belgian Cups (12), and the record number of Belgian Super Cups (18).

== History ==
History of Club Brugge

Brugsche Football Club (1891)
Football Club; Brugeois (1892)
Football Club Brugeois (1897)
Royal Football Club Brugeois (1920)
Club Brugge Koninklijke; Voetbalvereniging (1972)

In 1890, students from the Catholic school Broeders Xaverianen and the neutral school Koninklijk Atheneum joined together to form the Brugsche Football Club. The former students christened the club's founding by establishing the Latin motto 'mens sana in corpore sano' (a healthy mind in a healthy body). A year later on 13 November 1891, the club was re-created under Brugsche FC, and this is now seen as the official foundation of the current Club Brugge. In 1892, an official board was installed at the club to oversee all operations and team decisions. In 1895, the national athletics sports union was founded, predecessor of the later national football association, under the name UBSSA (Union Belge des Sociétés de Sports Athlétiques); Brugsche FC was a founding member of the UBSSSA and as such took part in the first league campaign organized in Belgian football during the 1895–96 season. Financial difficulties in the following year forced the club to leave the UBSSA, and soon after, Football Club Brugeois was formed by breakaway club members. The two sides were reunited in 1897 under the French name of Football Club Brugeois; they did not take on the Dutch title Club Brugge until 1972.

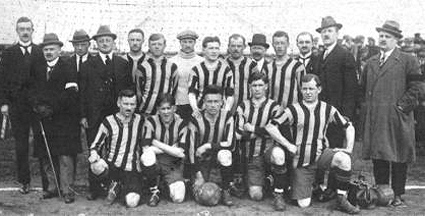
Picture of the 1919–20 squad that won the championship for a first time

In 1914, FC Brugeois reached their first Belgian Cup final, but lost 2–1 to Union SG. Six years later, the club claimed their first trophy, by winning the Belgian First Division during the 1919–20 season. They celebrated by changing their title to Royal FC Brugeois – with their regal status now reflected in their modern prefix KV, standing for Koninklijke Vereniging (royal club). Only eight years later though, the club was relegated to the Belgian Second Division for the first time in their history following a relegation play-off. Further lean times followed the relegation in 1928, as they spent much of the 1940s and 1950s in the second division of Belgian football.

Following the 1958–59 season, the club earned promotion back to the First Division and have not been relegated since. The club were able to add to their trophy cabinet in 1968, winning the first of their record 11 Belgian Cup titles for the first time after defeating Beerschot A.C. 7–6 in a penalty-shootout after a 1–1 draw.

The club enjoyed their most success under legendary Austrian manager Ernst Happel as he led the club to three straight league championships from 1975–76 to 1977–78 and a Belgian Cup victory in 1976–77. Happel also guided Club Brugge to their first European final, reaching the 1976 UEFA Cup Final. Over the two-legged final against English giants Liverpool, Club Brugge fell 3–4 on aggregate. Two years later, Brugge again met Liverpool in a European final, this time in the 1978 European Cup Final at Wembley, becoming the first Belgian club to reach the final of the competition. Brugge fell to a lone second-half goal from Kenny Dalglish as Liverpool won their second European Cup and third European trophy in succession. Following the cup final loss to Liverpool, Happel left Club Brugge and would lead Netherlands later that summer to the final of the 1978 FIFA World Cup.

On 25 November 1992, Brugge player Daniel Amokachi became the first goal scorer in the Champions League. He scored in a 1–0 win over CSKA Moscow.

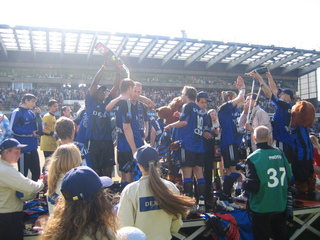
Players celebrating the 2004–05 Championship

During the 2004-05 season, Club Brugge won its 13th Belgian league championship under Norwegian manager Trond Sollied, its second title in three seasons.

In March 2015, Club Brugge won the Belgian Cup with a 2–1 victory over Anderlecht. After Aleksandar Mitrović equalised for Anderlecht in the 89th minute, Lior Refaelov scored the winning goal in stoppage time, securing the club's first Belgian Cup title since 2007.

In May 2016, the club secured its first Belgian league championship in 11 years under manager Michel Preud'homme. The title was clinched with a 4-0 home victory over Anderlecht, in which Abdoulay Diaby scored twice along with goals from Hans Vanaken and Timmy Simons.

In 2020, the club were declared Belgian champions after the Pro League voted to terminate the 2019–20 season during the COVID-19 pandemic, at the time of the season's suspension, the club held a 15-point lead over second-placed Gent.

On 20 May 2021, Brugge drew 3–3 with rivals Anderlecht to win the Belgian First Division A title for the fourth time in six years and 17th time overall. It was the first time since 1973 that Club Brugge had been crowned champions at Anderlecht's ground and the first time since 1976–77 and 1977–78 that Brugge had won back-to-back league titles. A year later, they would become champions for a third time in a row at Antwerp's ground, the first time since 1977–79. They would go on and qualify for the 2022–23 UEFA Champions League knockout for the first time in the modern history, after losing only once, keeping 5 clean sheets in the group stage, and a 0-0 draw away to Atlético Madrid. This made Brugge the third Belgian club ever to reach the competition's knockout stage and the first Belgian side to secure advancement. Goalkeeper Simon Mignolet played a key role in the club's defensive performances.

In June 2025, the club announced the biggest sponsorship in its history with Betsson under which the company's betFIRST brand would appear on the front of the team’s shirts for domestic matches, beginning with a friendly against KV Kortrijk on 28 June, while the betsson.sport brand would be featured on kits for European competitions. In September 2026, Betsson rebranded its Belgian operations to its eponymous brand with its front-of-shirt sponsorship of Club Brugge continuing under the Betsson brand.

== Crest and colours ==
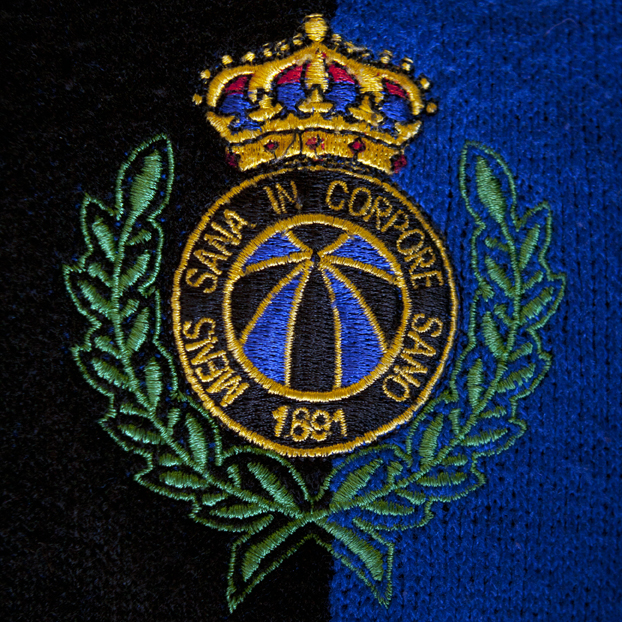
Old and iconic logo used until the end of the 70s

The club wear a blue and black home kit and these colours have been traditional through their history. Away from home they usually wear a light coloured kit; colours like white, light blue and yellow have all been used in recent years. The club's current kit supplier is Castore.

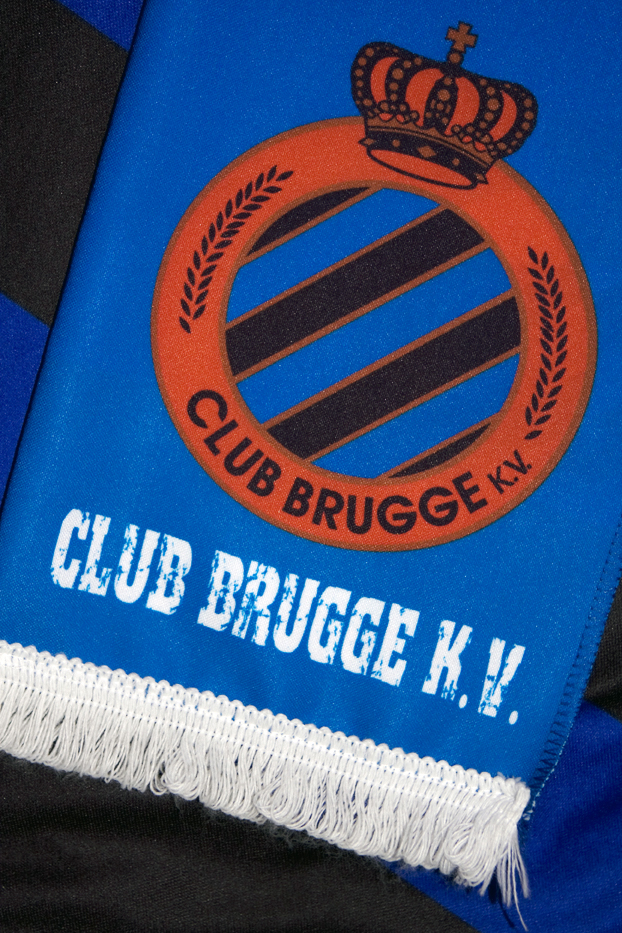
Logo used until 2012, inspired by the RCD Espanyol logo

Period	Kit manufacturer	Shirt main sponsor	Back shirt sponsor
1972–1974	adidas	Carad	—
1974–1976	adidas	49R Jeans	—
1976–1979	Puma	49R Jeans	—
1979–1982	Puma	St.-Louis Geuze	—
1982–1985	Puma	Bacchus	—
1985–1992	Puma	Assubel	—
1992–1995	Puma	VTM	—
1995–1996	adidas	VTM	VTM
1996–1997	adidas	Gemeentekrediet	VTM
1997–2000	adidas	Gemeentekrediet	—
2000–2007	adidas	Dexia	Dexia
2007–2012	Puma	Dexia	Dexia
2012–2013	Puma	Belfius	Belfius
2013–2014	Nike	Belfius	Belfius
2014–2015	Nike	Club Brugge Foundation	Proximus
2015–2017	Nike	Daikin	Proximus
2017–2019	Macron	Daikin	Proximus
2019–2020	Macron	Unibet	Proximus
2020–2023	Macron	Unibet	Candriam
2023–2024	Macron	Unibet	Allianz
2024–2025	Castore	Unibet	Allianz
2025-2026	Castore	Betsson (betFIRST.sport or betsson.sport)	Allianz
2026-	Castore	Betsson (betsson.sport)	Allianz

== Facilities ==
=== Stadium ===
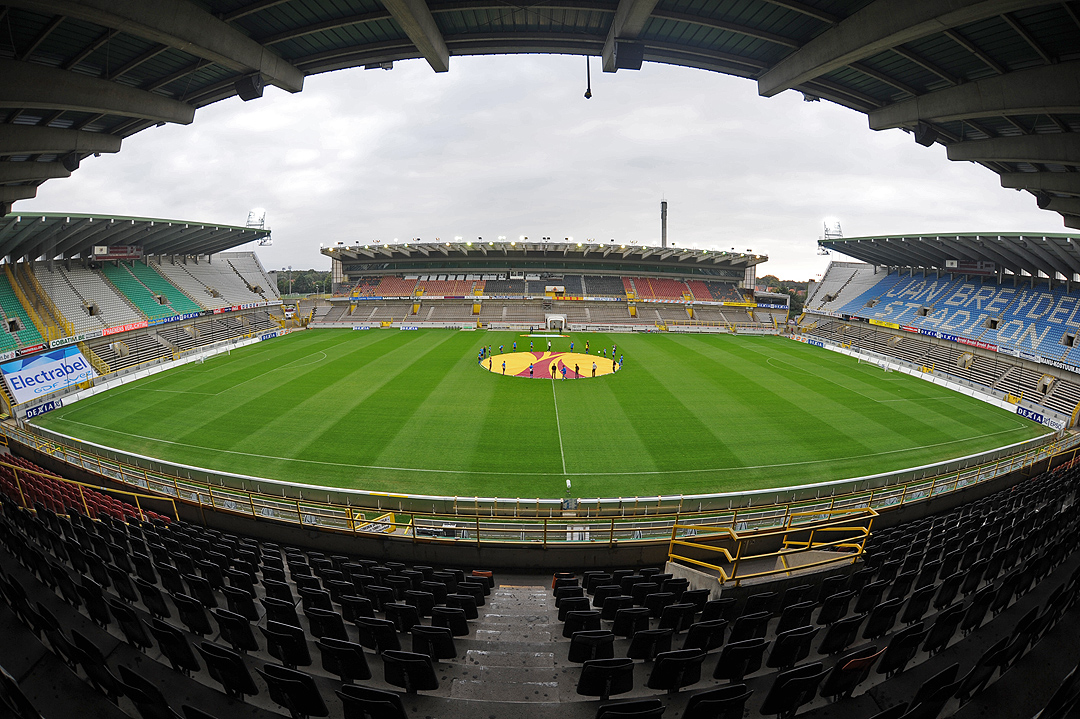
Jan Breydel Stadium

The club's original home in the Sint-Andries district of Bruges was known as the Rattenplein (rats' stadium) since it was owned by the local fox terrier club, who used it for another imported English pastime: rat baiting. This non-UEFA affiliated 'sport' involved getting dogs to chase and kill rats. In 1911, the team moved to a new ground, called De Klokke (after a nearby pub), which was renamed the Albert Dyserynckstadion after the sudden death of Club Brugge chairman Albert Dyserynck.

Their current stadium, since 1975, was rebranded in honour of local butcher and revolutionary Jan Breydel in 1998. Breydel led a rising against the city's French overlords in the 1300s. The venue – which Club Brugge share with local rivals Cercle Brugge – was previously named the Olympiastadion.

=== New stadium ===
Since 2007, Club Brugge has pursued plans to replace the Jan Breydel Stadium. The original proposal, announced under chairman Michel D'Hooghe, envisioned a 40,000-seat stadium and shopping complex near the E40 motorway in Loppem. In 2009, the Flemish government instead selected a site in the Chartreuse neighborhood, but the project faced opposition over its environmental impact and traffic implications. This plan was annulled in September 2013 forcing the club to seek another location Later in 2013, plans were announced for two stadiums along the Blankenbergse Steenweg, one for Club Brugge and another for Cercle Brugge. Cercle withdrew from the proposal in 2014, preferring to remain at the Jan Breydel Stadium. In September 2017, the Flemish government finally approved a regional land-use plan for the proposed stadium, but further legal challenges and objections from landowners continued to delay the project.

In January 2020, Club Brugge and the city agreed to instead develop a new stadium on the existing Olympiasite, adjacent to the Jan Breydel Stadium. The revised proposal included a surrounding public park while allowed the existing stadium to remain in use during construction. In October 2021, the Flemish government granted the environmental permit for development. In February 2023, the 2021 permit was annulled on appeal following an assessment of issues involving parking requirements and the environmental objections.

The team submitted a revised application in November 2023, with additional measures addressing parking and mobility. In April 2024, the Council of State upheld the annulment of the original permit. On 3 June 2024, the Flemish government granted a new permit, which was again challenged by nearby residents. However, 200 other nearby residents publicly supported the development. In January 2026, the Council of State rejected a legal challenge concerning the planned roads and surrounding Olympiapark. In July 2026, the Flemish Council for Permit Disputes rejected a separate legal challenge to the project, clearing a major obstacle to construction. Six residents filed an additional legal challenge in August 2026, but were unable to get the permit suspended.

As of September 2026, the club plans to begin construction in early 2027, targeting opening the stadium during the 2029-30 season.

=== Belfius Basecamp ===
In November 2016, the club broke ground on a new training complex at Westkapelle Knokke-Heis; all in addition to the already available sports complex Molenhoek. In September 2019, Club Brugge officially opened the complex. The Belfius Basecamp facility includes training pitches, accommodation, fitness facilities and medical infrastructure, providing a dedicated training centre for the club's senior squad plus the U21 and U19 teams.

== Supporters ==
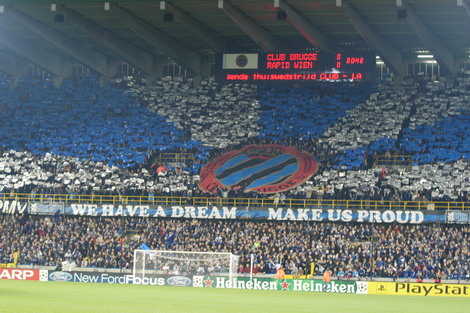
Tifo before the Champions League game Club Brugge-Rapid Wien in 2005

Some of the fans are part of 62 supporter clubs in Belgium, which have more than 10,000 members. The "Supportersfederatie Club Brugge KV", founded in 1967, is recognized as the official supporters club of Club Brugge. The federation is made up of 60 recognized supporters' clubs and has an elected board to steer the operation in the right direction. Club Brugge is the most popular club in the Flanders region of Belgium.

In tribute to the fans, often dubbed the twelfth man in football, Club Brugge no longer assigns the number 12 to players. Club Brugge also has a TV show, CLUBtv, on the Telenet network since 21 July 2006. This twice weekly show features exclusive interviews with players, coaches and managers.

== Mascot ==
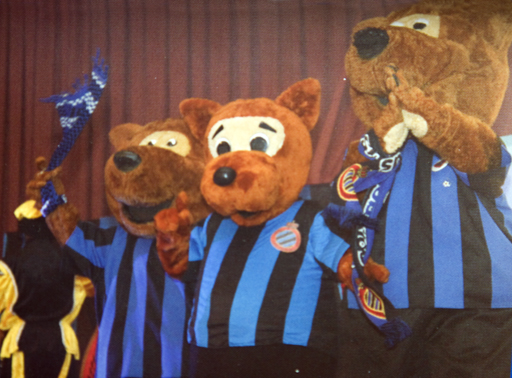
The three Bears; mascots of Club Bruges

The official mascot of Club Bruges is a bear, symbol of the city of Bruges. The history of the bear is related to a legend of the first Count of Flanders, Baldwin I of Flanders, who had fought and defeated a bear in his youth. Since the end of 2000, a second mascot, also a bear, travels along the edge of the field during home games for fans to call and encourage both their favorites. These two bears are called Belle and Bene. In 2010, a third bear named Bibi, made its appearance. He is described as the child of the first two mascots, and is oriented towards the young supporters.

== Rivalries ==
Like many historic clubs, Club Brugge contests rivalries with other Belgian clubs, whether at local (Cercle Brugge) or regional level (Antwerp) or nationally competitive (Anderlecht and Standard Liège).

=== Anderlecht ===
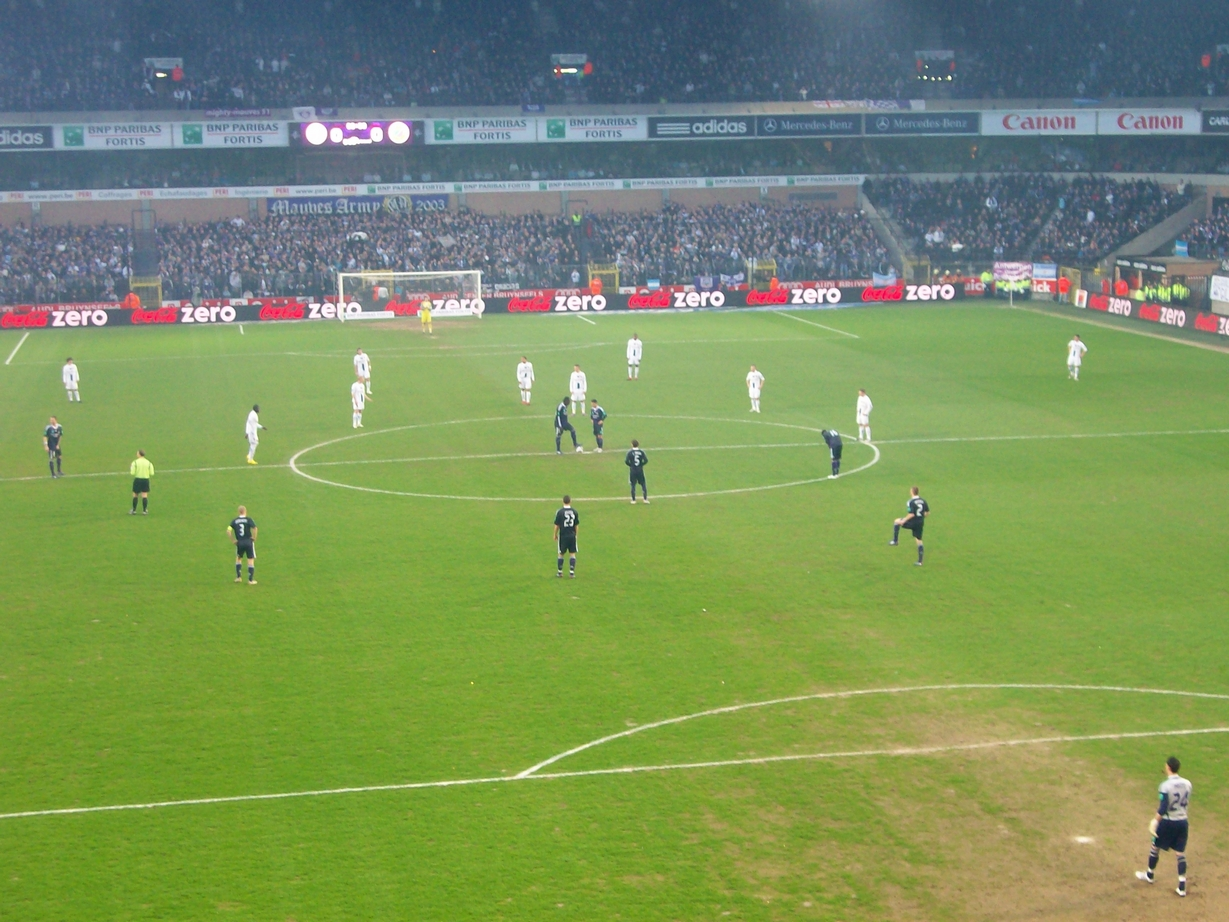
2010 Championship playoff game between Anderlecht and Club Brugge

The rivalry between Club Brugge and Anderlecht has developed since the 1970s. At that time, the Brussels-based club and Club Brugge won most trophies between them, leaving little room for other Belgian teams. Matches between these two teams were often contested for the title of champion of Belgium. Three Belgian Cup finals were played between the two clubs (with Anderlecht winning once and Club Brugge twice), and they played seven Belgian Supercups (Club Bruges won five). A match between these two sides is often called 'The Hate Game'. They are arguably the most heated fixtures in Belgian football together with clashes between the other two members of the Big Three – Anderlecht and Standard Liège.

=== Cercle Brugge ===
The Bruges derby is considered one of the most significant fixtures of the season for supporters of both clubs. The match consistently draws large crowds, and both sets of fans are known to produce notable displays including tifos, flags, and banners made specifically for the occasion. Flares and smoke bombs are also commonly seen in and around the stadium, though their use depends on enforcement at any given match. The winner of the derby is traditionally referred to as "de Ploeg van Brugge" — meaning "the team of Bruges." It has also become a custom for supporters of the winning side to plant a flag bearing their club's crest or colors on the center spot following the final whistle.

=== R. Antwerp FC ===
The rivalry between the oldest clubs in Flanders and Belgium, is one that dates back to the 1900s. In 1908, due to Bruges supporters attacking Antwerp players after they had lost 2–1 to what we'll later call Club Brugge, one of the biggest and fiercest rivalries in Europe came to be. Confrontations between the two sides bring a lot of fighting and havoc to the stadium and the surrounding neighbourhoods. This hatred has reached new highs ever since Antwerp gained promotion back to the first division.

== Honours ==
Type	Competition	Titles	Seasons
Domestic	Belgian First Division	20	1919–20, 1972–73, 1975–76, 1976–77, 1977–78, 1979–80, 1987–88, 1989–90, 1991–92, 1995–96, 1997–98, 2002–03, 2004–05, 2015–16, 2017–18, 2019–20, 2020–21, 2021–22, 2023–24, 2025–26
Domestic	Belgian Cup	12	1967–68, 1969–70, 1976–77, 1985–86, 1990–91, 1994–95, 1995–96, 2001–02, 2003–04, 2006–07, 2014–15, 2024–25
Domestic	Belgian Super Cup	18	1980, 1986, 1988, 1990, 1991, 1992, 1994, 1996, 1998, 2002, 2003, 2004, 2005, 2016, 2018, 2021, 2022, 2025

- record

=== European Achievements ===
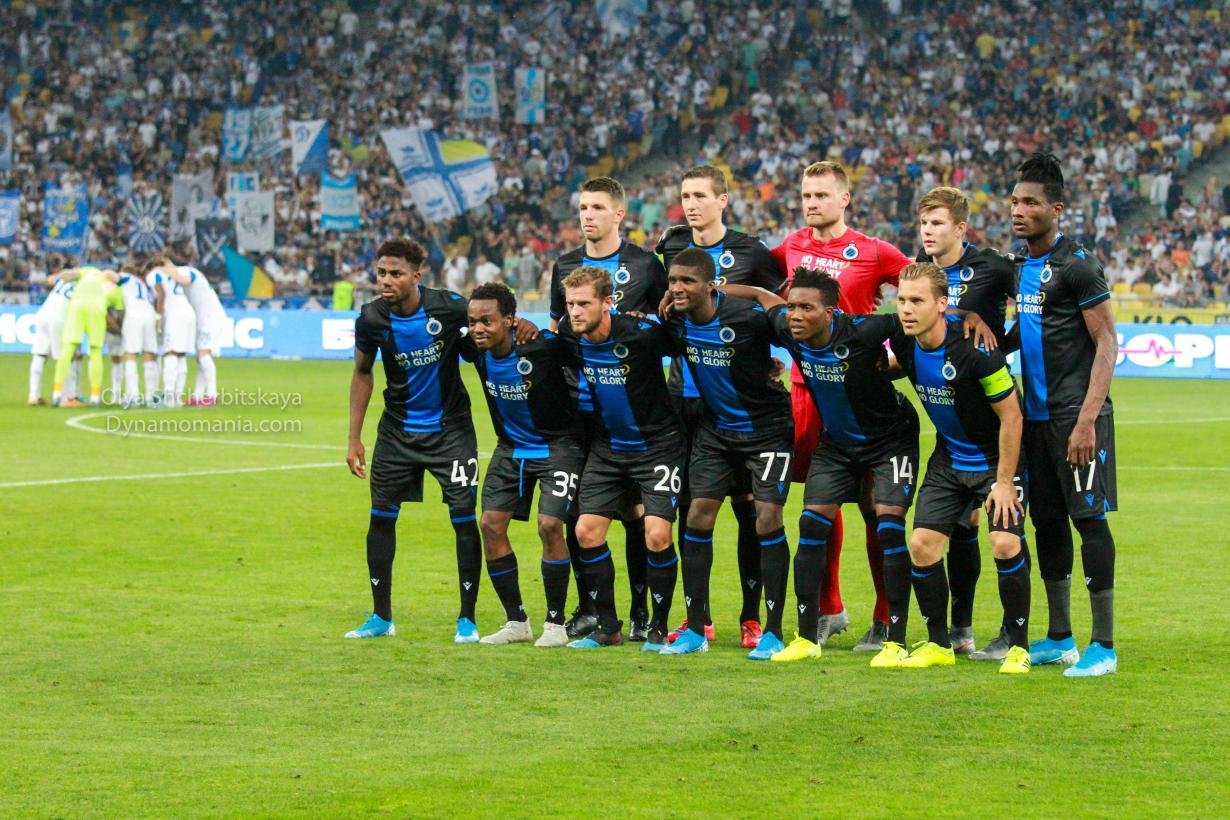
Team picture during the 2019–20 Champions League

- European Cup
  - Runners-up: 1977–78
- UEFA Cup
  - Runners-up: 1975–76
  - Semi-finalists: 1987–88
- European Cup Winners' Cup
  - Semi-finalists: 1991–92
- UEFA Europa Conference League
  - Semi-finalists: 2023–24

=== Minor ===
- Kirin Cup
  - Winners: 1981
- Amsterdam Tournament
  - Winners: 1990

=== Individual ===
- Belgian Golden Shoe
  - Fernand Boone (1967),Erwin Vandendaele (BEL) (1971), Julien Cools (1977), Jan Ceulemans (1980, 1985, 1986), Franky Van Der Elst (1990, 1996), Paul Okon (1996), Timmy Simons (2002), José Izquierdo (2016), Ruud Vormer (2017), Hans Vanaken (2018, 2019, 2024), Simon Mignolet (2022), Ardon Jashari (2025)

=== Results ===
Season	Division				Division	Points	Notes	Cup	Europe
	I	II	III	IV					
1895–96	6				Belgian First Division A	11			
1896–97							Did not play		
1897–98							Did not play		
1898–99	2				Belgian First Division A		Lost in championship final to FC Liégeois		
1899–1900	2				Belgian First Division A	12	Lost in championship final to Racing Club de Bruxelles		
1900–01	8				Belgian First Division A	8			
1901–02	6				Belgian First Division A	2			
1902–03	5				Belgian First Division A	4			
1903–04	3				Belgian First Division A	4	3rd of 4 teams in final round		
1904–05	3				Belgian First Division A	28			
1905–06	2				Belgian First Division A	29			
1906–07	3				Belgian First Division A	24			
1907–08	3				Belgian First Division A	26			
1908–09	3				Belgian First Division A	33			
1909–10	2				Belgian First Division A	38	Lost championship final to Union SG		
1910–11	2				Belgian First Division A	34			
1911–12	4				Belgian First Division A	29		1/4	
1912–13	7				Belgian First Division A	19		1/8	
1913–14	4				Belgian First Division A	27		fin	
1914–15							WWI		
1915–16							WWI		
1916–17							WWI		
1917–18							WWI		
1918–19							WWI		
1919–20					Belgian First Division A	34			
1920–21	4				Belgian First Division A	26			
1921–22	9				Belgian First Division A	25			
1922–23	8				Belgian First Division A	23			
1923–24	9				Belgian First Division A	23			
1924–25	11				Belgian First Division A	21			
1925–26	10				Belgian First Division A	25			
1926–27	8				Belgian First Division A	26		R1	
1927–28	13 ↓				Belgian First Division A	22			
1928–29		1 ↑			Belgian Second Division	43			
1929–30	6				Belgian First Division A	27			
1930–31	5				Belgian First Division A	29			
1931–32	11				Belgian First Division A	24			
1932–33	13 ↓				Belgian First Division A	16			
1933–34		3			Belgian Second Division	34			
1934–35		1 ↑			Belgian Second Division	40			
1935–36	9				Belgian First Division A	23			
1936–37	10				Belgian First Division A	25			
1937–38	5				Belgian First Division A	27			
1938–39	14				Belgian First Division A	17			
1939–40							WWII		
1940–41	9 ↓				Belgian First Division A	5	War competition		
1941–42		3			Belgian Second Division	36			
1942–43		2			Belgian Second Division	43			
1943–44		3			Belgian Second Division	42			
1944–45							WWII		
1945–46		1 ↑			Belgian Second Division	53			
1946–47	19 ↓				Belgian First Division A	22			
1947–48		4			Belgian Second Division	38			
1948–49		1 ↑			Belgian Second Division	49			
1949–50	14				Belgian First Division A	22			
1950–51	16 ↓				Belgian First Division A	21			
1951–52		2			Belgian Second Division	42			
1952–53		8			Belgian Second Division	30			
1953–54		12			Belgian Second Division	29		1/8	
1954–55		3			Belgian Second Division	38		1/4	
1955–56		6			Belgian Second Division	32		1/16	
1956–57		10			Belgian Second Division	28			
1957–58		5			Belgian Second Division	34			
1958–59		2 ↑			Belgian Second Division	39			
1959–60	13				Belgian First Division A	26			
1960–61	8				Belgian First Division A	29			
1961–62	5				Belgian First Division A	35			
1962–63	8				Belgian First Division A	30			
1963–64	12				Belgian First Division A	24		1/8	
1964–65	9				Belgian First Division A	28		1/16	
1965–66	5				Belgian First Division A	35		1/16	
1966–67	2				Belgian First Division A	45		1/8	
1967–68	2				Belgian First Division A	45			
1968–69	5				Belgian First Division A	35		1/8	EC2: I
1969–70	2				Belgian First Division A	45			
1970–71	2				Belgian First Division A	46		1/16	EC2: 1/4
1971–72	2				Belgian First Division A	45		1/16	EC3: I
1972–73					Belgian First Division A	45		1/16	EC3: II
1973–74	5				Belgian First Division A	32		1/16	EC1: II
1974–75	4				Belgian First Division A	49		1/16	
1975–76					Belgian First Division A	52		1/2	EC3: fin
1976–77					Belgian First Division A	52		win	EC1: 1/4
1977–78					Belgian First Division A	51		1/2	EC1: fin
1978–79	6				Belgian First Division A	38		fin	EC1: I
1979–80					Belgian First Division A	53		1/4	
1980–81	6				Belgian First Division A	37		1/8	EC1: I
1981–82	15				Belgian First Division A	28		1/16	EC3: I
1982–83	5				Belgian First Division A	43		fin	
1983–84	3				Belgian First Division A	44		1/8	
1984–85	2				Belgian First Division A	48		1/8	EC3: II
1985–86	2				Belgian First Division A	52	Play-offs ended with 1–1 in Anderlecht and 2–2 in Bruges	win	EC3: II
1986–87	3				Belgian First Division A	45		1/8	EC2: I
1987–88					Belgian First Division A	51		1/4	EC3: 1/2
1988–89	4				Belgian First Division A	43		1/4	EC3: II
1989–90					Belgian First Division A	57		1/16	EC2: II
1990–91	4				Belgian First Division A	47		win	EC1: II
1991–92					Belgian First Division A	53		1/8	EC2: 1/2
1992–93	6				Belgian First Division A	40		1/8	CL: P
1993–94	2				Belgian First Division A	53		fin	
1994–95	3				Belgian First Division A	49		win	EC2: 1/4
1995–96					Belgian First Division A	81		win	EC2: II
1996–97	2				Belgian First Division A	71		1/16	EC3: III
1997–98					Belgian First Division A	84		fin	EC3: II
1998–99	2				Belgian First Division A	71		1/16	EC3: III
1999–2000	2				Belgian First Division A	67		1/16	UC: I
2000–01	2				Belgian First Division A	78		1/16	UC: III
2001–02	2				Belgian First Division A	70		win	UC: III
2002–03					Belgian First Division A	79		1/4	CL+UC: III
2003–04	2				Belgian First Division A	72		win	CL+UC: IV
2004–05					Belgian First Division A	79		fin	UC: P
2005–06	3				Belgian First Division A	64		1/16	CL+UC: III
2006–07	6				Belgian First Division A	51		win	UC: P
2007–08	3				Belgian First Division A	67		1/8	UC: I
2008–09	3				Belgian First Division A	59		1/8	UC: P
2009–10	3				Belgian First Division A	41		1/4	EL: II
2010–11	4				Belgian First Division A	43		1/8	EL: P
2011–12	2				Belgian First Division A	48		1/8	EL: II
2012–13	3				Belgian First Division A	46		1/8	EL: I
2013–14	3				Belgian First Division A	48		1/8	EL: 3Q
2014–15	2				Belgian First Division A	47		win	EL: 1/4
2015–16					Belgian First Division A	54		fin	EL: I
	1A	1B	1Am	2Am			From 2016–17: 1A, 1B, 1Am, 2Am	Cup	Europe
2016–17	2				Belgian First Division A	45		1/8	CL: I
2017–18					Belgian First Division A	46		1/2	EL: P
2018–19	2				Belgian First Division A	50		1/16	EL: 1/16
2019–20					Belgian First Division A	70	Competition ended after 29 matches due to COVID-19 pandemic in Belgium	fin	EL: 1/16
2020–21					Belgian First Division A	44		1/4	EL: 1/16
2021–22					Belgian First Division A	50		1/2	CL: I
2022–23	4				Belgian Pro League	36		1/8	CL: 1/8
2023–24					Belgian Pro League	50		1/2	ECL: 1/2
2024–25	2				Belgian Pro League	53		win	CL: 1/8
2025–26					Belgian Pro League	57		1/4	CL: KP PO

== Players ==
=== Current squad ===
As of 31 August 2026

Note: Flags indicate national team as defined under FIFA eligibility rules; some limited exceptions apply. Players may hold more than one non-FIFA nationality.

No.	Pos.	Nation	Player
1	GK	SUI	Yann Sommer
3	DF	KOR	Lee Han-beom
4	DF	ECU	Joel Ordóñez
7	FW	GER	Nicolò Tresoldi
8	MF	ENG	Freddie Potts
9	FW	POR	Carlos Forbs
10	MF	NOR	Hugo Vetlesen
11	FW	ESP	Jan Virgili
16	MF	SUI	Cheveyo Tsawa
17	FW	BEL	Romeo Vermant
20	MF	BEL	Hans Vanaken (captain)
27	FW	GER	Wisdom Mike
29	GK	BEL	Nordin Jackers
32	DF	BEL	Matteo Dams

No.	Pos.	Nation	Player
41	DF	BEL	Hugo Siquet
44	DF	BEL	Brandon Mechele
54	DF	FRA	Samba Coulibaly
58	DF	BEL	Jorne Spileers
62	MF	BEL	Lynnt Audoor
64	DF	BEL	Kyriani Sabbe
65	DF	BEL	Joaquin Seys
67	FW	SEN	Mamadou Diakhon
70	MF	ESP	Alejandro Granados
77	FW	SUI	Andrej Vasovic
80	MF	FRA	Félix Lemaréchal
81	GK	BEL	Argus Vanden Driessche
85	MF	SLO	Tian Nai Koren
86	MF	ITA	Gianluca Okon

=== Out on loan ===
Note: Flags indicate national team as defined under FIFA eligibility rules; some limited exceptions apply. Players may hold more than one non-FIFA nationality.

No.	Pos.	Nation	Player
—	FW	SWE	Gustaf Nilsson (at Hertha BSC until 30 June 2027)

=== Retired numbers ===
12 – The 12th man. Reserved for the club supporters in July 2003.

23 – (Belgium) François Sterchele, striker (2007–08). Posthumous; Sterchele died in a single-person car accident on 8 May 2008.

== Coaching staff ==
=== First-team staff ===
As of 10 October 2025

Position	Name
Head coach	(Croatia) Ivan Leko
Assistant Coach	(Nigeria) Joseph Akpala (Portugal) Jonathan Alves (Belgium) Kevin Deslypere (England) Nicolas Still
Assistant Coach	(Belgium) Kevin Deslypere (Belgium) Michiel Jonckheere
Goalkeeping Coach	(Belgium) Wouter Biebauw
Physical Coach	(Belgium) Carl Vandenbussche
Sports Scientist	(Belgium) Sander Denolf
Physical Coach	(Belgium) Eddie Rob
Team Manager	(Belgium) Michael Vijverman
Team Doctor	(Belgium) Bruno Vanhecke
Team Doctor	(Belgium) Thomas Tampere
Mental Coach	(Belgium) Rudy Heylen
Physiotherapist	(Belgium) David Bombeke
Physiotherapist	(Belgium) Leen Van Damme
Physiotherapist	(Belgium) Thomas De Jonghe
Masseur	(Belgium) Ronny Werbrouck
Video Analyst	(Belgium) Jarne Kesteloot
Video Analyst	(Belgium) Mathias Bernaert
Team Support	(Belgium) Kevin Monseré
Team Support	(Belgium) Pascal Plovie
Team Support	(Belgium) Stefaan Van Gierdeghom

=== Reserves staff ===
Position	Name
Head coach T1	(Netherlands) Robin Veldman
Assistant Coach T2	(Belgium) Steve Colpaert
Goalkeeping Coach	(Belgium) Gianny De Vos
Physical Coach	(Belgium) Dirk Laleman
Team Manager	(Belgium) Christophe De Nolf
Physiotherapist	(Belgium) Astrid Pattyn
Physiotherapist	(Belgium) Dimitri Vastenavondt
Video Analyst	(Belgium) Niels Van den Wyngaert
Team Support	(Belgium) Erwin Beyen
Team Support	(Belgium) Karel Gobert
Team Support	(Belgium) Kristoff Deryckere
Team Support	(Belgium) Lander Nolf

=== Club Academy staff ===
Head coach U18	(Belgium) Siebe Blondelle
Head coach U16	(Belgium) Stijn Claeys

== Board of directors ==
Position	Name
President	(Belgium) Bart Verhaeghe
Board Member	(Belgium) Jan Boone
Board Member	(Belgium) Bart Coeman
Board Member	(Belgium) Sam Sabbe
Board Member	(Belgium) Peter Vanhecke
CEO	(Belgium) Bob Madou

=== List of presidents ===
Below is the official presidential history of Club Brugge KV

- (Belgium) Philippe Delescluze (1891–1900)
- (Belgium) Albert Seligmann (1900–02)
- (Belgium) Alfons De Meulemeester (1903–14)
- (Belgium) Albert Dyserynck (1919–31)
- (Belgium) Fernand Hanssens (1932–37)
- (Belgium) Emile De Clerck (1937–59)
- (Belgium) André De Clerck (1959–73)
- (Belgium) Fernand De Clerck (1973–99)
- (Belgium) Michel Van Maele (1999–03)
- (Belgium) Dr. Michel D'Hooghe (2003–09)
- (Belgium) Pol Jonckheere (2009–11)
- (Belgium) Bart Verhaeghe (2011–present)

=== Honorary presidents and directors ===
- (Belgium) Dr. Michel D'Hooghe (Honorary president)
- (Belgium) Fernand De Clerck (Honorary president)
- (Belgium) Marcel Kyndt (Honorary vice-president)
- (Belgium) Raoul Beuls (Honorary vice-president)
- (Belgium) Chris Caestecker (Honorary director)
- (Belgium) Guido Claeys (Honorary director)
- (Belgium) Dr. William De Groote (Honorary director)
- (Belgium) Guy Jacobs (Honorary director)
- (Belgium) Pol Jonckheere (Honorary director)
- (Belgium) André Piccu (Honorary director)
- (Belgium) Herman Valcke (Honorary director)
- (Belgium) Hugo Vandamme (Honorary director)
- (Belgium) Dr. Roland Watteyne (Honorary director)

== See also ==
- Club YLA (Club Brugge women)
