= KRC Gent =

Belgian football club

- Full name: Koninklijke Racing Club Gent
- Founded: 1899
- Ground: PGB-stadion
- Capacity: 2500
- Chairman: Luc Pennoit
- Manager: Elimane Coulibaly
- League: Belgian Division 2
- 2025–26: Belgian Division 2 VV A, 14th of 16

Koninklijke Racing Club Gent is a Belgian association football club from the city of Ghent, East Flanders. It is currently playing in the Belgian Division 2, i.e. the fourth level in the Belgian football league system. The club underwent 5 merges and changed its name many times. It achieved its best ranking in Belgium in 1925 and 1929 with a 5th place in the first division.

== History ==
The club was founded in the late nineteenth century with the fusion between Athletic Club Gantois (Gantois means "from Ghent" in French), FC Gantois and Sport Pédestre Gantois. The new club named Racing Club de Gand registered to the Belgian Football Association in the late 1890s and received the matricule n°11. It took part to the 1898–99 and 1899–1900 seasons in the first division B. Back in 1908 at the top level, the club finished last (12th) and played two seasons in the second division. It lost the final of the first Belgian Cup in history in 1912. From 1911 to 1935 R.C. de Gand played in the first division (except in 1922–23 and 1930–31 when it was in the second division) and so did its rivals KAA Gent between 1913 and 1929. The club had meanwhile changed its name to RRC de Gand in 1925.

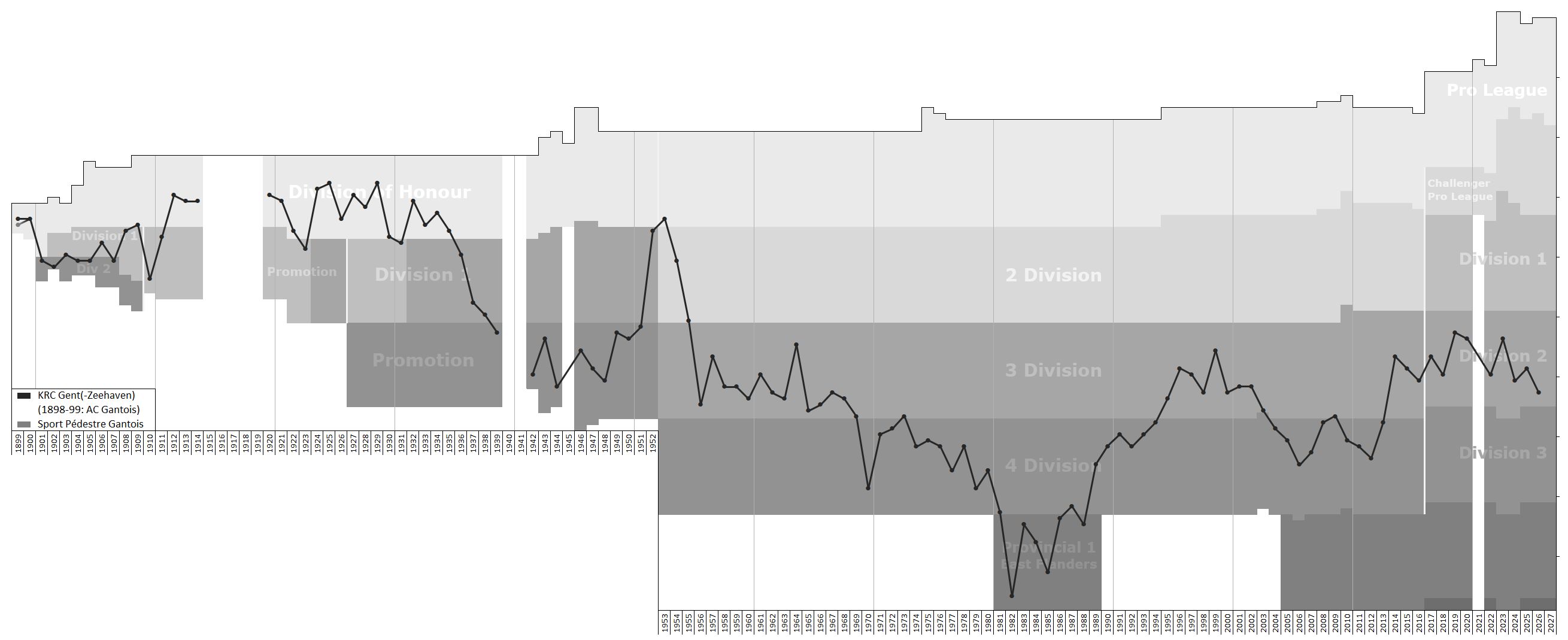
Historical chart of KRC Gent league performance

In 1952 the club played in the first division again but this time for its last season at this stage, as of 2026. Three years later it was relegated to the third division from which it would never be promoted. In 1987 RRC Gent (as it was named since 1969, i.e. the name of the city was put to Dutch) merged with FC Heirnis Gent to become RRC Heirnis Gent. It then changed back briefly to RRC Gent in 1999 and merged with KVV Standaard Meulestede in 2000 to become RRC Gent-Zeehaven. In 2002 the club merged with KFC Oostakker and changed its name to KRC Gent-Zeehaven. Finally in 2016 the club changed its name to KRC Gent.

== Honours ==
- Belgian Second Division
  - Winners (1): 1930–31
  - Runners-up (1): 1922–23
- Belgian Cup
  - Runners-up (1): 1911–12
