= RCS Verviétois =

Belgian football club

R.C.S. Verviétois
- Founded: 1896
- Dissolved: 2015

Royal Cercle Sportif Verviétois – Football Club Sérésien was a Belgian association football club from the municipality of Verviers, Liège. It last played in the Belgian Third Division B during the 2014–15 season where it finished 17th out of 18th and was forced to fold entirely due to financial difficulties. The club was one of the first to register in Belgium, as it became a member of the Belgian Football Association in 1896 and received the matricule number 8.

== History ==
The club founded in 1896 as Verviers F.C., reached the first division in 1900, but was relegated in 1907 as it finished last. Its best ranking at the highest level was a 4th place in 1906. In 1903, the team had merged with Stade Wallon de Verviers to become C.S. Verviétois. Verviers was back at the top level in 1912 but was relegated again 12 years later. It played one season again in the first division in 1925–26 at the end of which the club added Royal to its name after existing for 25 years.

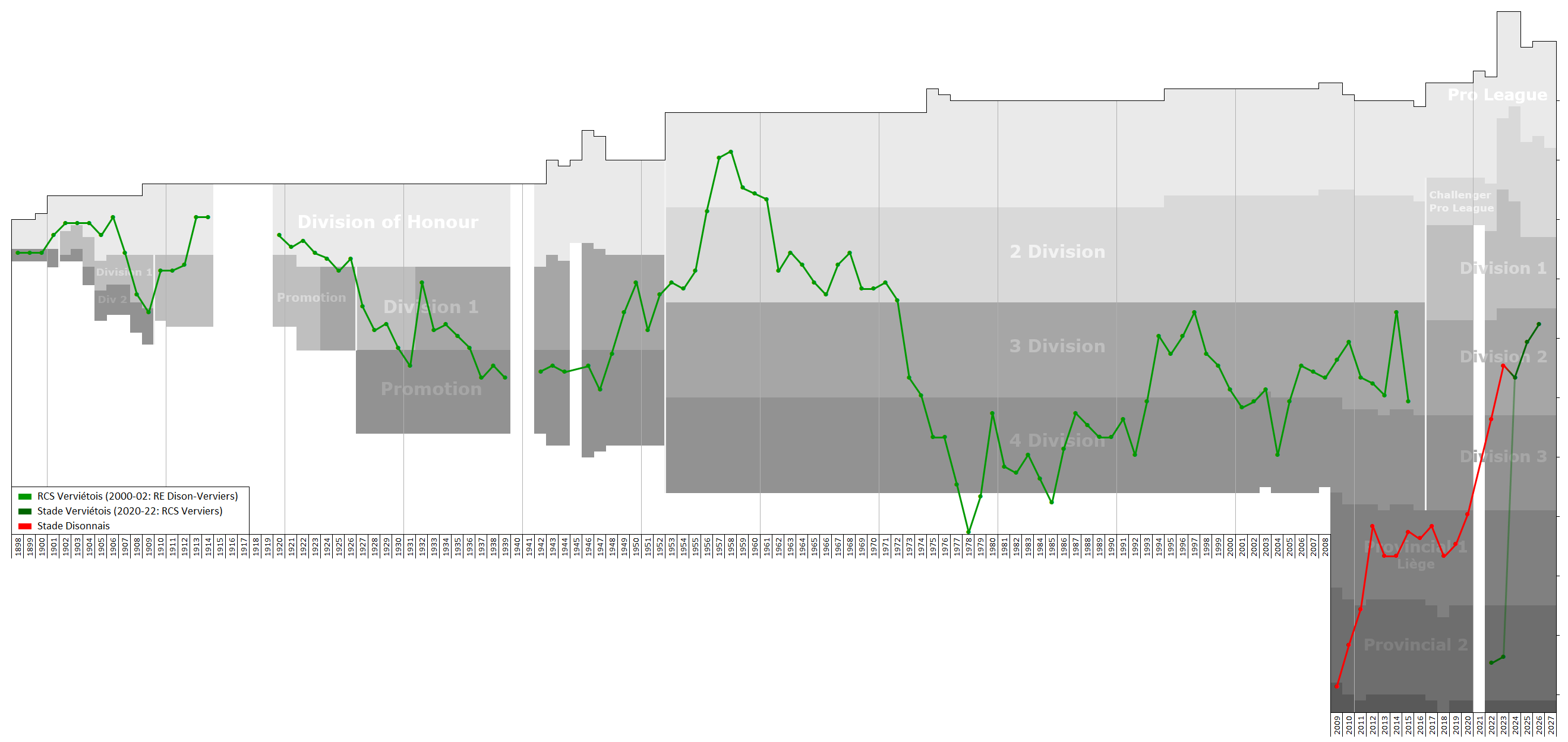
Historical chart of RCS Verviétois league performance

The last return of the club to the highest level was in the late 1950s (1956–61) when the team played and won against some of the biggest teams in Belgian football, including Standard Liège, RFC Liège and Anderlecht. Verviers also reached the final of the Belgian Cup in 1956, losing out 2–1 to Tournai at the Heysel Stadium.

Following the relegation in 1961, the team slowly dropped into the lower regions of Belgian football, relegating to the Belgian Third Division in 1972, to the Belgian Fourth Division in 1974 and into the Belgian Provincial leagues in 1977. The team managed to return to the Belgian Third Division in 1993 but was relegated again in 2000, when the club merged with R. Dison Sport to become R. Entente Dison-Verviers. Two more name changes were to occur soon after, first to R.E. Dison Verviers (E. is for Excelsior) and subsequently to R.C.S. Verviétois in 2002 when they returned to the Belgian Third Division. Following two more years in the Fourth Division between 2003 and 2005, from then on until the team folded due to financial difficulties in 2015, the team played in the Belgian Third Division.

Just weeks after the team folded, a new team was established, named Cercle Sportif Jeunesse Verviétoise, with matricule n°9657 which competed in the 2015–16 season with only youth teams. The intention of the owners is to start playing with a senior team again as of the 2016–17 season, which will be at the ninth and lowest level of the Belgian football pyramid.
