= List of Belgium international footballers (1–4 caps) =

The Belgium national football team represents the country of Belgium in international association football. It is fielded by the Royal Belgian Football Association, the governing body of football in Belgium, and competes as a member of the Union of European Football Associations (UEFA), which encompasses the countries of Europe.

This list contains all players with between 1 and 4 appearances for the national team. For a list of players with 21 or more caps, see List of Belgium international footballers, other players are listed at List of Belgium international footballers (5–20 caps).

== Players ==
Key
	Named to the national team in the past year
Bold	Still playing competitive football
#x	Played in one or more friendlies which are not FIFA-recognised, either due to an excessive number of substitutions according to the Laws of the Game or because the request to have a match treated as official was sent too late to the FIFA. Three matches currently fall under this category, namely the friendlies against Romania on 14 November 2012, against Luxembourg on 26 May 2014 and against Czech Republic on 5 June 2017. These three matches are recognised by the Belgian FA and therefore included in this list. The number besides the '#' symbol denotes the number of disputed matches for each player.
§x	Played one or more matches for Belgium at the 1920, 1924 or 1928 Summer Olympics, which are not counted as official matches by the Belgian FA and therefore not included in this list. Note that no caps were given for the 1920 Final as FIFA has not released the report of this game and on the official website it is stated that the game was abandoned, without any official result posted. The number besides the '§' symbol denotes the number of matches not counted for each player.

Appearances and goals are composed of FIFA World Cup and UEFA European Championship matches and each competition's required qualification matches, as well as UEFA Nations League matches and numerous international friendly tournaments and matches. Statistics correct as of 22 November 2017.

Player	Caps	Goals	Date of debut	Debut against	Date of last match	Last match against	Ref.
Pol Appeltans	1	0	21 Nov 1948	Netherlands	21 Nov 1948	Netherlands	
Dominique Baes	1	0	16 Feb 1913	France	16 Feb 1913	France	
Louis Baes	1	0	8 Dec 1924	England	8 Dec 1924	England	
Omer Baes	2	0	1 May 1913	Italy	4 May 1913	Switzerland	
**Zakaria Bakkali**	2	0	15 Oct 2013	Wales	10 Oct 2015	Andorra	
Alfons Bastijns	3	0	15 Nov 1970	France	26 Mar 1977	Netherlands	
Adolphe Becquevort	2	0	9 Mar 1913	Netherlands	1 May 1913	Italy	
Dirk Beheydt	1	0	26 Jun 1977	Italy	26 Jun 1977	Italy	
Michel Bensch	3	0	24 Feb 1952	Italy	19 Oct 1952	Netherlands	
Edward Bertels	2	0	27 Mar 1960	Switzerland	2 Oct 1960	Netherlands	
Alfred Bertrand	1	0	17 Oct 1948	France	17 Oct 1948	France	
Alain Bettagno	2	0	17 Dec 1994	Spain	23 Aug 1995	Germany	
Prudent Bettens	3	0	16 Apr 1967	Netherlands	9 Oct 1968	Finland	
Jacques Beurlet	3	0	24 Apr 1968	Soviet Union	19 Oct 1969	Yugoslavia	
Luc Beyens	2	0	14 Oct 1987	Scotland	11 Nov 1987	Luxembourg	
Karel Beyers	1	0	15 Apr 1964	Switzerland	15 Apr 1964	Switzerland	
Fernand Blaise	1	0	25 May 1953	Finland	25 May 1953	Finland	
Jonathan Blondel	4	0	21 Aug 2002	Poland	3 Mar 2010	Croatia	
Florent Bohez	3	0	19 Mar 1967	Luxembourg	21 May 1967	Poland	
Mathieu Bollen	4	2	23 Sep 1953	Finland	19 Apr 1959	Netherlands	
Georges Bonhivers	1	0	22 Jan 1927	Czechoslovakia	22 Jan 1927	Czechoslovakia	
**Sammy Bossut** ^{#1}	1	0	26 May 2014	Luxembourg	26 May 2014	Luxembourg	
Désiré Bourgeois	2	0	25 Feb 1934	Irish Free State	11 Mar 1934	Netherlands	
Paul Bouttiau	4	0	13 Mar 1910	Netherlands	10 Apr 1910	Netherlands	
Prosper Brandsteert	1	0	30 Apr 1905	Netherlands	30 Apr 1905	Netherlands	
Fernand Brichant	2	0	24 Feb 1914	England	26 Apr 1914	Netherlands	
David Brocken	2	0	3 Feb 1999	Cyprus	7 Sep 1999	Morocco	
Geert Broeckaert	1	0	12 Sep 1990	East Germany	12 Sep 1990	East Germany	
Nicolas Broeckaert	2	0	23 Aug 1989	Denmark	25 Oct 1989	Luxembourg	
Xavier Caers	1	0	30 Apr 1975	Netherlands	30 Apr 1975	Netherlands	
Tom Caluwé	1	1	11 May 2006	Saudi Arabia	11 May 2006	Saudi Arabia	
Arthur Cambier	1	0	9 May 1907	Netherlands	9 May 1907	Netherlands	
**Mehdi Carcela**	2	0	17 Nov 2009	Qatar	3 Mar 2010	Croatia	
Ferdinand Caremans	1	0	15 Jan 1922	France	15 Jan 1922	France	
Pierre Carteus	2	0	15 Nov 1970	France	25 Nov 1970	Denmark	
**Luis Pedro Cavanda**	2	0	10 Oct 2015	Andorra	13 Nov 2015	Italy	
Arthur Ceuleers	4	2	21 Feb 1937	France	27 Feb 1938	Netherlands	
Robert Chapey	1	0	20 Feb 1912	Switzerland	20 Feb 1912	Switzerland	
Thomas Chatelle	3	0	18 Feb 2004	France	24 Mar 2007	Portugal	
Hans Christiaens	2	0	12 Oct 1988	Brazil	16 Nov 1988	Czechoslovakia	
Jean Claes (born 1934)	1	0	4 Oct 1959	Netherlands	4 Oct 1959	Netherlands	
Jean Claes (born 1902)	1	0	15 Mar 1925	Netherlands	15 Mar 1925	Netherlands	
Gert Claessens	4	1	11 Oct 1997	Wales	18 Nov 1998	Luxembourg	
Geoffrey Claeys	3	1	29 May 1996	Italy	30 Apr 1997	Turkey	
Léon Close	2	0	31 Mar 1957	Spain	26 Oct 1958	Turkey	
Julien Cnudde	1	0	8 Dec 1924	England	8 Dec 1924	England	
Joseph Coenegracht	1	0	8 Jan 1928	Austria	8 Jan 1928	Austria	
Pieter Collen	2	0	11 May 2006	Saudi Arabia	6 Sep 2006	Armenia	
Théo Colette	2	0	17 Nov 1957	Netherlands	8 Dec 1957	Turkey	
**Steve Colpaert**	1	0	3 Mar 2010	Croatia	3 Mar 2010	Croatia	
Joseph Cootmans	1	0	14 Feb 1926	Hungary	14 Feb 1926	Hungary	
Hubert Cordiez	1	0	21 Dec 1977	Italy	21 Dec 1977	Italy	
Peter Crève	3	1	11 Nov 1987	Luxembourg	26 Mar 1988	Hungary	
Claude Crote	1	0	4 Oct 1961	Sweden	4 Oct 1961	Sweden	
Jacques Culot	2	0	26 May 1957	Romania	5 Jun 1957	Iceland	
Nathan D'Haemers	1	0	11 May 2006	Saudi Arabia	11 May 2006	Saudi Arabia	
Bob Dalving	1	0	22 May 1976	Netherlands	22 May 1976	Netherlands	
Marcel De Corte	3	0	4 Apr 1954	Netherlands	30 May 1954	France	
Firmin De Coster	1	0	14 Oct 1956	Netherlands	14 Oct 1956	Netherlands	
Wim De Decker	2	0	11 May 2006	Saudi Arabia	6 Sep 2006	Armenia	
Albert De Deken	1	0	29 Mar 1936	Netherlands	29 Mar 1936	Netherlands	
François De Deken	1	0	29 Mar 1936	France	29 Mar 1936	France	
Léopold De Groof	2	0	5 May 1921	Italy	9 Oct 1921	Spain	
Michel De Groote	4	0	30 Mar 1983	East Germany	22 Dec 1984	Albania	
**Ritchie De Laet**	2	0	29 May 2009	Chile	31 May 2009	Japan	
Paul De Mesmaeker	1	0	11 Nov 1987	Luxembourg	11 Nov 1987	Luxembourg	
Tom De Mul	2	0	2 Jun 2007	Portugal	6 Jun 2007	Finland	
Alain De Nil	1	0	3 Jun 1992	Faroe Islands	3 Jun 1992	Faroe Islands	
Albert De Raedt	4	0	29 Jan 1939	Germany	21 Apr 1940	Netherlands	
Sepp De Roover	2	0	14 Nov 2009	Hungary	17 Nov 2009	Qatar	
Jean-François De Sart	3	0	27 May 1989	Yugoslavia	23 Aug 1989	Denmark	
Maurits De Schrijver	4	0	27 May 1982	Denmark	15 Dec 1982	Scotland	
**Stijn De Smet**	1	0	26 Mar 2008	Morocco	26 Mar 2008	Morocco	
Charles De Vogelaere	1	0	28 Sep 1958	Netherlands	28 Sep 1958	Netherlands	
Dirk De Vriese	1	0	17 Oct 1984	Albania	17 Oct 1984	Albania	
François De Wael	1	1	24 Dec 1944	France	24 Dec 1944	France	
Gaston De Wael	2	0	8 Apr 1956	Netherlands	31 Mar 1957	Spain	
Henri Dedecker	2	0	7 May 1905	France	14 May 1905	Netherlands	
François Degelas	4	0	5 Jun 1955	Czechoslovakia	31 Mar 1957	Spain	
Franky Dekenne	3	0	11 Nov 1987	Luxembourg	5 Jun 1988	Denmark	
Gérard Delbeke	1	0	20 Jul 1930	Paraguay	20 Jul 1930	Paraguay	
Hervé Delesie	1	0	22 May 1976	Netherlands	22 May 1976	Netherlands	
Clément Demeyer	3	0	9 Nov 1912	England	4 May 1913	Switzerland	
Georges Demulder	1	0	14 May 1939	Switzerland	14 May 1939	Switzerland	
Charles Demunter	1	0	5 Oct 1924	Denmark	5 Oct 1924	Denmark	
André Denul	3	2	3 Feb 1971	Scotland	20 May 1971	Luxembourg	
Henri Depireux	2	0	5 Nov 1969	Mexico	3 Feb 1971	Scotland	
**Laurent Depoitre**	1	1	10 Oct 2015	Andorra	10 Oct 2015	Andorra	
Gérard Desanghere	1	0	18 Nov 1973	Netherlands	18 Nov 1973	Netherlands	
Joseph Desmedt	4	2	12 Mar 1933	Switzerland	7 May 1933	Netherlands	
Georges Despae ^{§1}	4	2	11 Nov 1924	France	26 May 1927	Czechoslovakia	
Robert Deurwaerder	1	0	3 Mar 1963	Netherlands	3 Mar 1963	Netherlands	
Georges Ditzler	3	0	2 May 1926	Netherlands	20 Jun 1926	France	
Frans Dogaer	3	0	5 May 1921	Italy	15 Jan 1922	France	
Alfons Dresen	4	0	25 Dec 1955	France	23 Dec 1956	West Germany	
Léopold Dries	3	0	11 Nov 1924	France	15 Mar 1925	Netherlands	
Grégory Dufer	4	1	31 Mar 2004	Germany	9 Oct 2004	Spain	
Gustaaf Eeckeman	2	0	17 Mar 1940	Netherlands	21 Apr 1940	Netherlands	
**Yassine El Ghanassy**	1	0	10 Aug 2011	Slovenia	10 Aug 2011	Slovenia	
Geert Emmerechts	1	0	19 Jan 1988	Israel	19 Jan 1988	Israel	
Didier Ernst	1	0	30 Mar 1999	Egypt	30 Mar 1999	Egypt	
Victor Erroelen	4	0	14 Mar 1948	Netherlands	6 Jun 1948	France	
Auguste Fierens	1	0	28 Mar 1920	France	28 Mar 1920	France	
Ronald Foguenne	2	0	23 Aug 1995	Germany	6 Sep 1995	Denmark	
**Thomas Foket**	2	0	9 Nov 2016	Netherlands	28 Mar 2017	Russia	
Carl Fourneaux	1	0	9 May 1907	Netherlands	9 May 1907	Netherlands	
Antoine Franckx	2	0	9 May 1936	England	24 May 1936	Switzerland	
Albert Friling	2	0	1 May 1904	France	17 Apr 1909	England	
Philippe Garot	2	0	26 Sep 1979	Netherlands	17 Oct 1979	Portugal	
Charles Geerts	1	0	26 Sep 1954	Germany	26 Sep 1954	Germany	
Robert Gerard	2	0	24 Dec 1944	France	13 May 1945	Luxembourg	
Félix Geybels	1	0	14 Jun 1959	Austria	14 Jun 1959	Austria	
Léon Gillaux	2	1	13 May 1945	Luxembourg	15 Dec 1945	France	
Frans Gommers	2	0	30 Jan 1938	France	27 May 1939	Poland	
Christophe Grégoire	2	0	13 Oct 2007	Finland	21 Nov 2007	Azerbaijan	
Paul Grumeau	1	0	30 Apr 1905	Netherlands	30 Apr 1905	Netherlands	
Alfons Haagdoren	1	0	8 Oct 1967	Poland	8 Oct 1967	Poland	
Philip Haagdoren	1	0	7 Jun 1997	San Marino	7 Jun 1997	San Marino	
Rudi Haleydt	1	0	5 Sep 1976	Iceland	5 Sep 1976	Iceland	
Augustinus Hellemans	2	2	31 May 1931	Portugal	11 Oct 1931	Poland	
Albert Henderickx	1	0	5 Oct 1924	Denmark	5 Oct 1924	Denmark	
Roger Henrotay	4	1	17 Apr 1974	Poland	8 Sep 1974	Iceland	
Jos Heyligen	2	0	18 Apr 1973	East Germany	15 Oct 1980	Republic of Ireland	
Robert Heyse	1	0	8 Jan 1928	Austria	8 Jan 1928	Austria	
Gunther Hofmans	1	0	22 Apr 1992	Cyprus	22 Apr 1992	Cyprus	
Joseph Homble	1	0	2 Nov 1947	Switzerland	2 Nov 1947	Switzerland	
Ivan Hoste	1	0	22 Sep 1982	West Germany	22 Sep 1982	West Germany	
Jean-Marie Houben	2	0	8 Jun 1989	Canada	23 Aug 1989	Denmark	
Victor Houet	4	1	23 Mar 1924	Netherlands	13 Dec 1925	Austria	
**David Hubert**	2	0	10 Aug 2011	Slovenia	6 Sep 2011	United States	
Dirk Huysmans	1	0	15 Nov 1995	Cyprus	15 Nov 1995	Cyprus	
Charly Jacobs	1	0	2 May 1979	Austria	2 May 1979	Austria	
Sébastien Jacquemyns	2	2	28 Sep 1955	Romania	16 Oct 1955	Netherlands	
Jean Jamers	2	0	17 Nov 1935	Sweden	16 Feb 1936	Poland	
Pier Janssen	3	1	19 Nov 1986	Bulgaria	29 Apr 1987	Republic of Ireland	
François Janssens	2	1	22 May 1972	Iceland	31 Oct 1973	Norway	
Eddy Jaspers	3	0	5 Sep 1984	Argentina	22 Dec 1984	Albania	
Nordin Jbari	2	0	14 Dec 1996	Netherlands	11 Feb 1997	Northern Ireland	
Louis Joux	2	0	26 Oct 1908	Sweden	16 May 1910	Germany	
**Christian Kabasele**	2	0	9 Nov 2016	Netherlands	10 Nov 2017	Mexico	
Clément Keerstock	3	0	3 Apr 1927	Sweden	4 Sep 1927	Sweden	
Vahram Kevorkian	1	1	26 Oct 1908	Sweden	26 Oct 1908	Sweden	
Daniel Kimoni	3	0	5 Feb 1999	Greece	28 Apr 1999	Romania	
Pierre Kogel	1	0	3 Apr 1910	France	3 Apr 1910	France	
Théo Lacroix	1	0	23 Nov 1949	Wales	23 Nov 1949	Wales	
Christophe Lauwers	2	0	24 Apr 1996	Russia	29 May 1996	Italy	
François Ledent	2	2	8 Jan 1928	Austria	12 Feb 1928	Irish Free State	
René Ledent	3	0	8 Jan 1928	Austria	29 Apr 1934	Netherlands	
Georges Leekens	3	0	15 Nov 1975	France	20 Sep 1978	Norway	
Maurice Lefebvre	1	0	17 Apr 1909	England	17 Apr 1909	England	
**Jonathan Legear**	2	0	8 Oct 2010	Kazakhstan	12 Oct 2010	Austria	
Erwin Lemmens	2	0	31 Mar 2004	Germany	29 May 2004	Netherlands	
Dominique Lemoine	4	0	11 Feb 1997	Northern Ireland	7 Jun 1997	San Marino	
Marcel Lemoine	3	0	20 Apr 1966	France	25 May 1966	Republic of Ireland	
**Christophe Lepoint**	2	1	19 May 2010	Bulgaria	11 Aug 2010	Finland	
Jean-Marie Letawe	2	0	28 Feb 1960	France	2 Oct 1960	Netherlands	
Louis Leysen	4	0	27 Oct 1957	France	13 Apr 1958	Netherlands	
**Anthony Limbombe**	1	0	27 Mar 2018	Saudi Arabia	27 Mar 2018	Saudi Arabia	
John Lodts	1	0	8 Mar 1936	France	8 Mar 1936	France	
Karel Mallants	2	1	23 Nov 1958	Hungary	20 Nov 1960	Switzerland	
Georges Mathot	2	0	29 Mar 1908	Netherlands	26 Apr 1908	Netherlands	
Rik Matthys	2	0	14 Oct 1951	Austria	25 Nov 1951	Netherlands	
Jules Mayné	3	0	9 Nov 1912	England	9 Mar 1913	Netherlands	
Dimitri M'Buyu	1	0	4 Feb 1987	Portugal	4 Feb 1987	Portugal	
Birger Maertens	1	0	12 Oct 2005	Lithuania	12 Oct 2005	Lithuania	
Jozef Mannaerts	1	0	21 Nov 1948	Netherlands	21 Nov 1948	Netherlands	
Frank Mariman	1	0	16 Dec 1981	Spain	16 Dec 1981	Spain	
Gilbert Marnette	1	0	13 Apr 1958	Netherlands	13 Apr 1958	Netherlands	
Honoré Martens	1	0	27 Feb 1938	Netherlands	27 Feb 1938	Netherlands	
**Ilombe Mboyo** ^{#1}	2	0	16 Oct 2012	Scotland	14 Nov 2012	Romania	
Jozef Melis	1	0	30 May 1946	Netherlands	30 May 1946	Netherlands	
Alfons Mertens	1	0	7 Dec 1930	France	7 Dec 1930	France	
Pierre Meuldermans	2	0	29 Mar 1936	Netherlands	13 Mar 1938	Luxembourg	
Guillaume Meulders	1	0	26 Oct 1908	Sweden	26 Oct 1908	Sweden	
Albert Michiels	4	0	27 Oct 1965	Bulgaria	17 Apr 1966	Netherlands	
Victor Michiels	1	0	4 Nov 1928	Netherlands	4 Nov 1928	Netherlands	
Marius Mondelé	4	0	31 Mar 1935	Netherlands	8 Mar 1936	France	
Georges Mordant	4	1	16 Apr 1950	Netherlands	4 Jun 1950	France	
Ernest Moreau de Melen	1	0	7 May 1905	France	7 May 1905	France	
Edouard Morlet	3	0	29 Apr 1923	Netherlands	24 May 1925	Switzerland	
François Moucheron	4	0	9 Mar 1919	France	15 May 1921	Netherlands	
Roland Moyson	1	1	23 Dec 1956	West Germany	23 Dec 1956	West Germany	
**Geoffrey Mujangi-Bia**	2	0	29 May 2009	Chile	31 May 2009	Japan	
Joseph Nelis	2	2	17 Mar 1940	Netherlands	21 Apr 1940	Netherlands	
Guido Nicolaes	2	0	13 Mar 1974	East Germany	17 Apr 1974	Poland	
Francis Nicolay	1	0	13 Mar 1974	East Germany	13 Mar 1974	East Germany	
Célestin Nollet	2	0	26 Mar 1922	Netherlands	15 Apr 1922	Denmark	
Camille Nys	4	0	2 Apr 1911	Netherlands	10 Mar 1912	Netherlands	
**Vadis Odjidja-Ofoe**	3	0	17 Nov 2010	Russia	7 Oct 2011	Kazakhstan	
**Denis Odoi**	1	0	25 May 2012	Montenegro	25 May 2012	Montenegro	
**Killian Overmeire**	1	0	19 Nov 2008	Luxembourg	19 Nov 2008	Luxembourg	
Davy Oyen	3	0	18 Nov 1998	Luxembourg	10 Oct 1999	England	
Jules Pappaert	4	0	11 Dec 1932	Austria	29 Apr 1934	Netherlands	
Frans Peeraer	3	0	21 Jan 1934	France	27 May 1934	Germany	
Tristan Peersman	4	0	29 May 2004	Netherlands	9 Oct 2004	Spain	
Alfons Peeters	4	0	22 Nov 1967	Luxembourg	16 Oct 1968	Yugoslavia	
Frédéric Peiremans	3	0	27 Mar 1996	France	31 Aug 1996	Turkey	
Auguste Pelsmaeker ^{§1}	3	0	17 Feb 1920	England	3 May 1925	Netherlands	
Jean Petit	4	0	3 Apr 1938	Netherlands	29 May 1938	Yugoslavia	
Maurice Petit	1	0	13 Mar 1910	Netherlands	13 Mar 1910	Netherlands	
Jozef Piedfort	1	0	25 Oct 1953	Netherlands	25 Oct 1953	Netherlands	
Jacques Pirlot	1	0	21 May 1922	Italy	21 May 1922	Italy	
Georges Pootmans	4	0	21 Mar 1909	Netherlands	9 May 1909	France	
**Dennis Praet**	1	0	12 Nov 2014	Iceland	12 Nov 2014	Iceland	
Georges Quéritet	1	2	1 May 1904	France	1 May 1904	France	
Jules Quoilin	1	0	11 Nov 1954	France	11 Nov 1954	France	
Émile Reuse	2	0	14 Apr 1907	Netherlands	16 May 1910	Germany	
Frans Reyniers	2	0	19 Oct 1952	Netherlands	16 Oct 1955	Netherlands	
Clément Robyn	2	0	30 Apr 1905	Netherlands	21 Apr 1907	France	
Joseph Robyn	4	0	9 May 1907	Netherlands	9 Nov 1912	England	
Kevin Roelandts	2	1	29 May 2009	Chile	31 May 2009	Japan	
Joseph Romdenne	1	0	14 May 1905	Netherlands	14 May 1905	Netherlands	
Léon Rosper	1	0	26 May 1927	Czechoslovakia	26 May 1927	Czechoslovakia	
Cédric Roussel	2	0	12 Feb 2003	Algeria	11 Oct 2003	Estonia	
Auguste Ruyssevelt ^{§1}	1	0	11 Apr 1926	France	11 Apr 1926	France	
Willy Saeren	2	0	6 Apr 1952	Netherlands	22 May 1952	France	
Koen Sanders	4	0	27 May 1989	Yugoslavia	17 Jan 1990	Greece	
Luc Sanders	1	0	31 Oct 1973	Norway	31 Oct 1973	Norway	
René Schietse	2	0	4 Mar 1911	England	26 Apr 1914	Netherlands	
Davy Schollen	1	0	24 May 2006	Turkey	24 May 2006	Turkey	
Martin Schroyens	3	0	24 Feb 1952	Italy	22 May 1952	France	
Jacques Secretin	3	1	21 Sep 1930	Czechoslovakia	29 Mar 1931	Netherlands	
Corneel Seys	2	0	13 Mar 1938	Luxembourg	5 Jun 1938	France	
Jeroen Simaeys	2	0	19 Nov 2008	Luxembourg	11 Feb 2009	France	
Eddy Snelders	1	0	14 Oct 1981	Netherlands	14 Oct 1981	Netherlands	
Karel Snoeckx	1	0	29 May 1996	Italy	29 May 1996	Italy	
Louis Somers	4	0	4 Nov 1928	Netherlands	21 Sep 1930	Czechoslovakia	
Lucien Spronck	3	1	14 Oct 1962	Netherlands	17 Apr 1966	Netherlands	
François Sterchele	4	0	24 Mar 2007	Portugal	13 Oct 2007	Finland	
Jacques Sterckval	2	0	17 Apr 1909	England	25 Apr 1909	Netherlands	
Jean Strubbe	1	0	2 Apr 1911	Netherlands	2 Apr 1911	Netherlands	
Joseph Taeymans	1	0	15 Mar 1925	Netherlands	15 Mar 1925	Netherlands	
Laurent Theunen	4	3	7 May 1905	France	9 May 1909	France	
Paul Theunis	2	0	29 Feb 1984	West Germany	17 Apr 1984	Poland	
Eric Thornton	2	0	30 Apr 1905	Netherlands	14 May 1905	Netherlands	
Guy Thys	2	0	6 Apr 1952	Netherlands	25 Oct 1953	Netherlands	
Jules Timmermans	3	0	2 Jan 1927	Czechoslovakia	8 Jan 1928	Austria	
Léon Torfs	3	0	4 Jun 1933	Poland	21 Feb 1937	France	
**Derrick Tshimanga**	1	0	10 Aug 2011	Slovenia	10 Aug 2011	Slovenia	
Guillaume Ulens	1	0	30 May 1935	Switzerland	30 May 1935	Switzerland	
Jean Valet	1	0	15 Apr 1951	Netherlands	15 Apr 1951	Netherlands	
Edouard Van Brandt	2	0	5 Jun 1932	Denmark	12 Jun 1932	Sweden	
Jacques Van Caelenberghe	4	1	28 Apr 1935	Germany	16 Feb 1936	Poland	
Félix Van Campenhout	2	0	11 Oct 1931	Poland	6 Dec 1931	Switzerland	
Albert Van Coile	1	0	14 Mar 1926	Netherlands	14 Mar 1926	Netherlands	
Jules Van Craen	2	4	17 Mar 1940	Netherlands	21 Apr 1940	Netherlands	
Armand Van De Kerkhove	2	0	17 Mar 1940	Netherlands	21 Apr 1940	Netherlands	
Jeng Van den Bosch	2	0	17 Jun 1954	England	20 Jun 1954	Italy	
François Vanden Eynde	4	2	11 Dec 1932	Austria	11 Mar 1934	Netherlands	
Frans Vanden Ouden	1	0	13 Dec 1925	Austria	13 Dec 1925	Austria	
Stéphane Van Der Heyden	4	0	9 Oct 1991	Hungary	7 Sep 1994	Armenia	
Frans Van Dessel	1	0	29 Apr 1934	Netherlands	29 Apr 1934	Netherlands	
Gustave Van Goethem	1	0	11 Nov 1924	France	11 Nov 1924	France	
Yvo Van Herp	3	1	31 Oct 1973	Norway	1 Jun 1974	Scotland	
Joris Van Hout	1	0	16 Oct 2002	Estonia	16 Oct 2002	Estonia	
Vital Van Landeghem	1	1	11 Dec 1932	Austria	11 Dec 1932	Austria	
Jozef Van Looy	1	0	18 May 1950	England	18 May 1950	England	
Godefroid Van Melderen	2	0	17 Apr 1909	England	25 Apr 1909	Netherlands	
Henri Van Poucke	2	0	21 Sep 1930	Czechoslovakia	28 Sep 1930	Sweden	
Julien Van Puymbroeck	1	0	5 Nov 1969	Mexico	5 Nov 1969	Mexico	
Julien Van Roosbroeck	1	0	14 Apr 1964	Switzerland	14 Apr 1964	Switzerland	
Théo Van Rooy	4	0	31 Mar 1957	Spain	5 Jun 1957	Iceland	
Edmond Van Staceghem	1	1	16 May 1910	Germany	16 May 1910	Germany	
Michel Van Vaerenbergh	2	1	30 May 1946	Netherlands	2 Jan 1949	Spain	
Guillaume Vanden Houten	1	0	21 May 1921	England	21 May 1921	England	
**Brian Vandenbussche**	3	0	20 May 2006	Slovakia	21 Nov 2007	Azerbaijan	
Francky Vandendriessche	1	0	29 Mar 2003	Croatia	29 Mar 2003	Croatia	
Léon Vandermeiren	3	0	17 Feb 1920	England	13 Dec 1925	Austria	
Gustave Vanderstappen	4	0	30 Apr 1905	Netherlands	18 Apr 1908	England	
René Vanderwilt	3	0	11 Nov 1956	France	26 May 1958	Switzerland	
Remy Vandeweyer	2	1	3 Jun 1956	Hungary	14 Oct 1956	Netherlands	
Julien Vandierendounck	1	0	5 Mar 1950	Italy	5 Mar 1950	Italy	
Franz Van Houtte	2	1	2 Apr 1911	Netherlands	23 Apr 1911	Germany	
Louis Verboven	2	0	29 Mar 1931	Netherlands	9 Apr 1933	Netherlands	
Edmond Verbruggen	1	0	16 May 1910	Germany	16 May 1910	Germany	
Louis Verbruggen	3	3	2 Oct 1949	Switzerland	25 Nov 1951	Netherlands	
Alfred Verdyck	1	0	1 May 1904	France	1 May 1904	France	
Pierre Vergeylen	1	0	28 Jan 1912	France	28 Jan 1912	France	
Pierre Verhoeven	1	0	5 May 1921	Italy	5 May 1921	Italy	
Sébastien Verhulst	1	0	5 Jun 1928	Netherlands	5 Jun 1928	Netherlands	
Gunter Verjans	4	0	22 Apr 1995	United States	29 May 1996	Italy	
Georges Verlinde	1	0	25 Feb 1923	France	25 Feb 1923	France	
Dany Verlinden	1	0	25 Mar 1998	Norway	25 Mar 1998	Norway	
Willy Vermeulen	2	0	30 May 1946	Netherlands	7 Apr 1947	Netherlands	
Hadelin Viellevoye	1	0	12 May 1935	Netherlands	12 May 1935	Netherlands	
Honoré Vlamynck	4	2	9 Mar 1919	France	19 Mar 1923	England	
**Björn Vleminckx**	3	0	11 Aug 2010	Finland	10 Aug 2011	Slovenia	
Jos Volders	1	0	26 Mar 1977	Netherlands	26 Mar 1977	Netherlands	
Fernand Voussure	1	0	24 Dec 1944	France	24 Dec 1944	France	
Stijn Vreven	2	0	21 Aug 2002	Poland	7 Sep 2002	Bulgaria	
Jonathan Walasiak	4	0	20 Aug 2003	Netherlands	12 Oct 2005	Lithuania	
Edward Wauters	4	0	1 Mar 1959	France	28 Feb 1960	France	
Félix Welkenhuysen	4	0	25 Feb 1934	Irish Free State	27 May 1934	Germany	
Pierre Weydisch	1	0	22 Oct 1933	Germany	22 Oct 1933	Germany	
Robert Weyn	1	0	10 Nov 1965	Israel	10 Nov 1965	Israel	
Alexandre Wigand	2	0	1 May 1904	France	13 May 1906	Netherlands	
Maurice Willems	3	4	14 Oct 1956	Netherlands	4 Sep 1957	Iceland	
Robert Willems	4	0	13 Apr 1960	Chile	24 Mar 1965	Republic of Ireland	
François Winnepenninckx	1	0	29 Jan 1939	Germany	29 Jan 1939	Germany	
Michel Wintacq	1	0	12 Oct 1983	Scotland	12 Oct 1983	Scotland	
Henri Woestad	1	0	12 Jun 1932	Sweden	12 Jun 1932	Sweden	
