= Belgium national football B team =

National association football B team

Belgium B
- Nickname: The Red Devils
- Association: Royal Belgian Football Association (KBVB/URBSFA/KBFV) (Note: The acronyms KBVB, URBSFA and KBFV come from the organisation's respective Dutch, French and German names: Koninklijke Belgische Voetbalbond, Union royale belge des sociétés de football association and Königliche Belgische Fußballverband.)
- Home stadium: N/A
First colours	Second colours

First international
- Belgium 2–1 Luxembourg (Arlon, Belgium; 4 May 1924)

Biggest win
- Belgium 8–0 Luxembourg (Charleroi, Belgium; 9 May 1954)

Biggest defeat
- Belgium 0–6 France (Charleroi, Belgium; 7 December 1930)

The Belgium national football B team was a secondary football team that occasionally served as support for the Belgium national football team. At times they have played against the full national team of Luxembourg; they have also played matches against 'B' or U-23 teams from other football associations. Since the team's first use in 1924, there have been at minimum 104 games; most of them against Luxembourg, but also against English, French, Italian, Norwegian, Portuguese, and Swiss teams. The last recorded match dates from February 2000 (a 1–1 draw against France B).

This team is assumed to have been always different from the Belgian U-21 team. However, it is not well documented whether this is the same Belgian team that played qualifiers for the Summer Olympics until 1988; neither is it clear whether age restrictions (e.g. under-25) have ever been applied.

== Match record ==
=== 1920s ===
23 March 1924 Friendly	France B	1 – 0	Belgium B	Strasbourg, France
	Goal	Report

4 May 1924 Friendly	Belgium B	2 – 1	Luxembourg	Arlon, Belgium
15:00	Vens; Jooris	Report1; Report2	Elter 56'	Stadium: Stade du Jeunesse; Attendance: 1,500; Referee: Robert Van Assche (Belgium)

11 May 1924 Friendly	Luxembourg	2 – 1	Belgium B	Luxembourg City, Luxembourg
15:00	Langers 35', 61'	Report1; Report2	??	Stadium: CA Spora Luxembourg field Attendance: 2,500; Referee: Gaston Vallat (France)

5 October 1924 Friendly	Belgium B	4 – 1	Luxembourg	Mechelen, Belgium
14:30	Diddens; De Spae; Verhoeven	Report1; Report2	Lefèvre	Stadium: Achter de Kazerne; Attendance: 8,000; Referee: Charles Barette (Belgium)

14 February 1926 Friendly	Luxembourg	1 – 1	Belgium B	Differdange, Luxembourg
14:30	Ries 89'	Report1; Report2	Diddens	Stadium: FA Red Boys Differdange field Attendance: 6,000; Referee: Nic Schmit (Luxembourg)

5 December 1926 Friendly	Belgium B	6 – 1	Luxembourg	Charleroi, Belgium
14:00	Goal	Report1; Report2	Lefèvre	Stadium: Stade du Pays de Charleroi; Attendance: 8,000; Referee: Charles Malevez (Belgium)

1 April 1928 Friendly	Luxembourg	2 – 3	Belgium B	Luxembourg City, Luxembourg
15:30	Koetz 10'; Berchem 34'	Report1; Report2	Bierna; Voorhoof	Stadium: CA Spora Luxembourg field Attendance: 3,000; Referee: Nic Schmit (Luxembourg)

4 November 1928 Friendly	Belgium B	1 – 1	Luxembourg	Ghent, Belgium
14:30	??	Report1; Report2	Bommertz 36'	Stadium: Stade Emmanuel Hiel; Attendance: 9,000; Referee: Roger Conrié (France)

=== 1930s ===
9 February 1930 Friendly	Luxembourg	0 – 1	Belgium B	Differdange, Luxembourg
14:30		Report1; Report2	Claessens	Stadium: FA Red Boys Differdange field Attendance: 4,500; Referee: Georges Balvay (France)

1 June 1930 Friendly	Belgium B	7 – 4	Luxembourg	Brugge, Belgium
16:00	Versyp; Vanderbauwhede; Diddens	Report1; Report2	Waltener 8', 50'; Theissen 29'; Becker 44'	Stadium: Cercle Brugge K.S.V. field Referee: Roger Conrié (France)

7 December 1930 Friendly	France B	6 – 0	Belgium B	Charleroi, France
	Goal	Report

1 March 1931 Friendly	Luxembourg	2 – 3	Belgium B	Luxembourg City, Luxembourg
15:00	Theissen 4'; Logelin 76'	Report1; Report2	Capelle; Secretin; Noeth	Stadium: Stade de Luxembourg; Attendance: 3,000; Referee: Louis Raguin (France)

14 February 1932 Friendly	Belgium B	6 – 3	Luxembourg	Charleroi, Belgium
14:30	Campenhout (pen.); Secretin; Bourgeois	Report1; Report2	Speicher 14', 83'; Kremer 33'	Stadium: Stade de la Neuville; Referee: Joop van Moorsel (The Netherlands)

=== 1960s ===
8 April 1964 Friendly	Italy B	1 – 1	Belgium B	Verona, Italy
		Report		Stadium: Stadio Marcantonio Bentegodi

16 March 1966 Friendly	Belgium B	3 – 3	Italy B	Charleroi, Belgium
		Report		Stadium: Stade de la Neuville

1 June 1966 Friendly	Portugal B	0 – 0	Belgium B	Lisbon, Portugal
		Report

22 March 1967 Friendly	Belgium B	2 – 0	Portugal B	Charleroi, Belgium
	Goal	Report

25 May 1969 Friendly	Belgium B	0 – 1	England U23	Oostende, Belgium
		Report1	Joe Royle	Stadium: Albertparkstadion

=== 1990s ===
24 March 1998 Friendly	Belgium B	1 – 1	Norway U23	Mouscron, Belgium
		Report1

Note: this record may not be exhaustive.

Opponents	Played	Won	Drawn	Lost	GF	GA	GD	Win %	Points/game (Note: According to the "three points for a win" standard)
England U23	1	0	0	1	0	1	-1	0.00	0.00
France	15	4	6	5	18	22	-4	26.67	1.20
Italy	2	0	2	0	4	4	0	0.00	1.00
Luxembourg	75	57	11	7	244	106	+138	76.00	2.43
Norway U23	1	0	1	0	1	1	0	0.00	1.00
Portugal	2	1	1	0	2	0	+2	50.00	1.50
Switzerland	8	4	1	3	18	13	+5	50.00	1.63
Totals	104	66	22	16	287	147	+140	63.46	2.12
