= 1949–50 in Belgian football =

Football in Belgium
- Season: 1949–50

The 1949–50 season was the 47th season of competitive football in Belgium. RSC Anderlechtois won their 3rd Premier Division title.
The Belgium national football team withdrew from the 1950 FIFA World Cup qualification but played 8 friendly games, winning 5.

== Overview ==
At the end of the season, R Stade Louvain and K Lyra were relegated to Division I, while Daring Club de Bruxelles SR (Division I A winner) and Beringen FC (Division I B winner) were promoted to the Premier Division.
Gosselies Sports, UR Namur, FC Winterslag and FC Verbroedering Geel were relegated from Division I to Promotion, to be replaced by FC Izegem, KAV Dendermonde, K Tubantia FC and Helzold FC Zolder.

== National team ==
Date	Venue	Opponents	Score*	Comp	Belgium scorers
October 2, 1949	Heysel Stadium, Brussels (H)	Switzerland	3-0	F	Louis Verbruggen (2), Joseph Mermans
November 6, 1949	Feijenoord Stadion, Rotterdam (A)	The Netherlands	1-0	F	Henri Govard
November 23, 1949	Ninian Park, Cardiff (A)	Wales	1-5	F	Henri Coppens
March 5, 1950	Stadio Comunale, Bologna (A)	Italy	1-3	F	Frédéric Chaves d'Aguilar
April 16, 1950	Bosuilstadion, Antwerp (H)	The Netherlands	2-0	F	Joseph Mermans, Albert De Hert
May 10, 1950	Heysel Stadium, Brussels (H)	Republic of Ireland	5-1	F	Joseph Mermans (3), Albert De Hert, Frédéric Chaves d'Aguilar
May 18, 1950	Heysel Stadium, Brussels (H)	England	1-4	F	Joseph Mermans
June 4, 1950	Heysel Stadium, Brussels (H)	France	4-1	F	Joseph Mermans (3), Georges Mordant

* Belgium score given first

Key

- H = Home match
- A = Away match
- N = On neutral ground
- F = Friendly
- o.g. = own goal

== Honours ==
Competition	Winner
Premier Division	RSC Anderlechtois
Division I	Daring Club de Bruxelles SR and Beringen FC
Promotion	FC Izegem, KAV Dendermonde, K Tubantia FC and Helzold FC Zolder

== Final league tables ==
=== Premier Division ===
Top scorer: Joseph Mermans (RSC Anderlecht) with 37 goals.
