= Verviers (Chamber of Representatives constituency) =

Belgian political subdivision

Verviers was a constituency used to elect members of the Belgian Chamber of Representatives between 1831 and 1999.

== Representatives ==
Election	Representative (Party)	Representative (Party)	Representative (Party)	Representative (Party)	Representative (Party)	Representative (Party)
1831	François Lardinois (Liberal)	Gilles Davignon (Liberal)	2 seats			
1833	François Lardinois (Liberal)	Grégoire Demonceau (Catholic)	2 seats			
1837	Pierre Lys (Liberal)	Grégoire Demonceau (Catholic)	2 seats			
1841	Pierre Lys (Liberal)	Pierre-Joseph David (Liberal)	2 seats			
1845	Pierre Lys (Liberal)	Gérard Moreau (Liberal)	Victor David (Liberal)			
1848	François De Pouhon (Liberal)	Gérard Moreau (Liberal)	Victor David (Liberal)			
1852	Dieudonné Closset (Liberal)	Gérard Moreau (Liberal)	Victor David (Liberal)			
1856	Pierre Grosfils-Gérard (Liberal)	Gérard Moreau (Liberal)	Victor David (Liberal)			
1857	Pierre Grosfils-Gérard (Liberal)	Gérard Moreau (Liberal)	Victor David (Liberal)			
1861	Pierre Grosfils-Gérard (Liberal)	Gérard Moreau (Liberal)	Victor David (Liberal)			
1864	Servais Van der Maesen (Liberal)	Gérard Moreau (Liberal)	Victor David (Liberal)			
1868	Servais Van der Maesen (Liberal)	Gérard Moreau (Liberal)	Victor David (Liberal)			
1870	Alfred Simonis (Catholic)	Prosper Cornesse (Catholic)	Victor David (Liberal)			
1874	Alfred Simonis (Catholic)	Guillaume Peltzer (Liberal)	Jean Ortmans (Liberal)			
1878	Charles Léopold Mallar (Liberal)	Guillaume Peltzer (Liberal)	Jean Ortmans (Liberal)	Léon d'Andrimont (Liberal)		
1882	Charles Léopold Mallar (Liberal)	Guillaume Peltzer (Liberal)	Auguste Loslever (Catholic)	Léon d'Andrimont (Liberal)		
1886	Charles Léopold Mallar (Liberal)	Guillaume Peltzer (Liberal)	Auguste Loslever (Catholic)	Léon d'Andrimont (Liberal)		
1890	Charles Léopold Mallar (Liberal)	Guillaume Peltzer (Liberal)	Pierre Joseph Grosfils (Liberal)	Léon d'Andrimont (Liberal)		
1892	Charles Léopold Mallar (Liberal)	Auguste Loslever (Catholic)	Pierre Joseph Grosfils (Liberal)	Léon d'Andrimont (Liberal)		
1894	Adolphe Gierkens (PS)	Jean Dauvister (PS)	Jean Malempré (PS)	Thomas Niézette (PS)		
1898	Antoine Borboux (Catholic)	Jean Delhez (Catholic)	Jules Poswick (Catholic)	Auguste Loslever (Catholic)		
1900	Antoine Borboux (Catholic)	Jean Malempré (PS)	Julien Davignon (Catholic)	Raymond de Biolley (Catholic)	Eugène Mullendorff (Liberal)	
1904	Antoine Borboux (Catholic)	Jean Malempré (PS)	Julien Davignon (Catholic)	Henri Pirard (PS)	Eugène Mullendorff (Liberal)	
1908	Antoine Borboux (Catholic)	Jean Dauvister (PS)	Julien Davignon (Catholic)	Henri Pirard (PS)	Eugène Mullendorff (Liberal)	
1912	Antoine Borboux (Catholic)	Jean Dauvister (PS)	Sébastien Winandy (Catholic)	Henri Pirard (PS)	Eugène Mullendorff (Liberal)	
1919	Pierre-Hubert David (Catholic)	Jules Hoen (PS)	Sébastien Winandy (Catholic)	Henri Pirard (PS)	Joseph Houget (Liberal)	
1921	Pierre-Hubert David (Catholic)	Jules Hoen (PS)	Sébastien Winandy (Catholic)	Thomas Niézette (PS)	Pierre Forthomme (Liberal)	
1925	Pierre-Hubert David (Catholic)	Jules Hoen (PS)	Sébastien Winandy (Catholic)	Thomas Niézette (PS)	Marc Somerhausen (PS)	Mathieu Duchesne (PS)
1929	Pierre-Hubert David (Catholic)	Jules Hoen (PS)	Sébastien Winandy (Catholic)	Louis Sandront (Catholic)	Pierre Forthomme (Liberal)	Mathieu Duchesne (PS)
1932	Pierre-Hubert David (Catholic)	Jules Hoen (PS)	Sébastien Winandy (Catholic)	Louis Sandront (Catholic)	Marc Somerhausen (PS)	Mathieu Duchesne (PS)
1936	Henri Horward (REX)	Jules Hoen (PS)	Sébastien Winandy (Catholic)	Louis Sandront (Catholic)	René Wintgens (REX)	Mathieu Duchesne (PS)
1939	Henri Horward (REX)	Jules Hoen (PS)	Michael Frères (Catholic)	Louis Sandront (Catholic)	Albert Devèze (Liberal)	Maurice Masson (Liberal)
1946	Albert Parisis (CVP)	Jules Hoen (BSP)	Henri Reul (PCB)	Jean Discry (CVP)	Mathieu Duchesne (BSP)	Pierre Kofferschläger (CVP)
1949	Albert Parisis (CVP)	Jules Hoen (BSP)	Jacques Van der Schueren (Liberal)	Jean Discry (CVP)	Paul Servais (CVP)	Pierre Kofferschläger (CVP)
1950	Albert Parisis (CVP)	Jules Hoen (BSP)	Jacques Van der Schueren (Liberal)	Jean Discry (CVP)	Germaine Copée-Gerbinet (BSP)	Pierre Kofferschläger (CVP)
1954	Albert Parisis (CVP)	Martin Boutet (BSP)	Jacques Van der Schueren (Liberal)	Jean Discry (CVP)	Germaine Copée-Gerbinet (BSP)	Pierre Kofferschläger (CVP)
1958	Albert Parisis (CVP)	Martin Boutet (BSP)	Albert Baltus (CVP)	Jean Discry (CVP)	Germaine Copée-Gerbinet (BSP)	Marcel Counson (CVP)
1961	Albert Parisis (CVP)	Martin Boutet (BSP)	Armand Fassin (Liberal)	Jean Discry (CVP)	Germaine Copée-Gerbinet (BSP)	Guillaume Schyns (cdH)
1965	Albert Parisis (CVP)	Martin Boutet (BSP)	Bruno Philippart (PVV)	5 seats	Germaine Copée-Gerbinet (BSP)	Guillaume Schyns (cdH)
1968	Albert Parisis (CVP)	Martin Boutet (BSP)	Bruno Philippart (PVV)	5 seats	Germaine Copée-Gerbinet (BSP)	Guillaume Schyns (cdH)
1971	Albert Parisis (CVP)	André Damseaux (PLP)	Maurice Petit (RW)	5 seats	Germaine Copée-Gerbinet (BSP)	Guillaume Schyns (cdH)
1974	Albert Parisis (CVP)	André Damseaux (PLP)	Alfred Evers (PLP)	5 seats	Yvan Ylieff (PSB)	Guillaume Schyns (cdH)
1977	Ferdinand Dupont (PSB)	André Damseaux (PLP)	Melchior Wathelet (cdH)	5 seats	Yvan Ylieff (PSB)	Guillaume Schyns (cdH)
1978	Alfred Evers (PLP)	André Damseaux (PLP)	Melchior Wathelet (cdH)	5 seats	Yvan Ylieff (PSB)	Guillaume Schyns (cdH)
1981	André Damseaux (PRL)	André Damseaux (PLP)	Melchior Wathelet (cdH)	5 seats	Yvan Ylieff (PSB)	Albert Gehlen (cdH)
1985	Jean-Marie Happart (PS)	André Damseaux (PLP)	Melchior Wathelet (cdH)	5 seats	Yvan Ylieff (PSB)	Albert Gehlen (cdH)
1988	Jean-Marie Happart (PS)	André Damseaux (PLP)	Melchior Wathelet (cdH)	5 seats	Yvan Ylieff (PSB)	Albert Gehlen (cdH)
1991	René Thissen (cdH)	André Damseaux (PLP)	Melchior Wathelet (cdH)	5 seats	Yvan Ylieff (PSB)	Albert Gehlen (cdH)
1995	Robert Denis (PRL)	Roger Hotermans (PRL)	4 seats		André Frédéric (PS)	Albert Gehlen (cdH)
1999	Robert Denis (PRL)	André Smets (cdH)	4 seats		André Frédéric (PS)	Géraldine Pelzer-Salandra (Ecolo)
