= 1955–56 in Belgian football =

Football in Belgium
- Season: 1955–56

The 1955–56 season was the 53rd season of competitive football in Belgium. RSC Anderlechtois won their 7th Division I title. This was also their third consecutive title, for the second time. RSC Anderlechtois also entered the first European Champion Clubs' Cup as Belgian champion. The Belgium national football team played 7 friendly games (2 wins, 1 draw, 4 losses). RRC Tournaisien won the Belgian Cup but after this season the competition was stopped due to the pressure of the top clubs in the vote to maintain or not the competition. The Belgian Cup would eventually resume in the 1963–64 season after the creation of the European Cup Winners' Cup.

== Overview ==
At the end of the season, K Waterschei SV Thor and KFC Malinois were relegated to Division II and were replaced by Division II winner RCS Verviétois and runner-up OC Charleroi.
The bottom 2 clubs in Division II (SRU Verviers and KFC Herentals) were relegated to Division III, to be replaced by (RCS Brugeois and VV Patro Eisden) from Division III.
The bottom 2 clubs of each Division III league KAV Dendermonde, KVK Waeslandia Burcht, RCS Hallois and RFC Bressoux were relegated to Promotion, to be replaced by FC Eeklo, K Olse Merksem SC, R Jeunesse Arlonaise and KFC Diest from Promotion.

== National team ==
| Date | Venue | Opponents | Score* | Comp | Belgium scorers |
|---|---|---|---|---|---|
| September 25, 1955 | Strahov Stadium, Prague (A) | Czechoslovakia | 2-5 | F | Henri Coppens, Richard Orlans |
| September 28, 1955 | Stadionul 23 August, Bucharest (A) | Romania | 0-1 | F |
| October 16, 1955 | Feijenoord Stadion, Rotterdam (A) | The Netherlands | 2-2 | F | Sébastien Jacquemijns (2) |
| December 25, 1955 | Heysel Stadium, Brussels (H) | France | 2-1 | F | Jean Jadot, Hippolyte Van Den Bosch |
| March 11, 1956 | Heysel Stadium, Brussels (H) | Switzerland | 1-3 | F | Joseph Mermans |
| April 8, 1956 | Bosuilstadion, Antwerp (H) | The Netherlands | 0-1 | F |
| June 3, 1956 | Heysel Stadium, Brussels (H) | Hungary | 5-4 | F | Robert Van Kerkhoven, Remy Vandeweyer, Richard Orlans (2), Denis Houf |

* Belgium score given first

Key

- H = Home match
- A = Away match
- N = On neutral ground
- F = Friendly
- o.g. = own goal

== European competitions ==
RSC Anderlechtois lost in the first round of the first European Champion Clubs' Cup to Vörös Lobogo of Hungary (defeat 6-3 away and defeat 1-4 at home).

== Honours ==
| Competition | Winner |
|---|---|
| Division I | RSC Anderlechtois |
| Cup | RRC Tournaisien |
| Division II | RCS Verviétois |
| Division III | RCS Brugeois and VV Patro Eisden |
| Promotion | FC Eeklo, K Olse Merksem SC, R Jeunesse Arlonaise and KFC Diest |

== Final league tables ==
=== Premier Division ===
- 1955-56 Top scorer: Jean Mathonet (Standard Liège) with 26 goals.
- 1955 Golden Shoe: Alfons Van Brandt (K Lierse SK)
