= 1912–13 Milan FBCC season =

Italian football club season

Milan Foot-Ball and Cricket Club
1912–13 season
- President: Piero Pirelli
- Manager: Piero Peverelli
- Stadium: Campo Milan di Porta Monforte; Arena Civica
- Italian Football Championship: 3rd
- Top goalscorer: League: Louis Van Hege (17); All: Louis Van Hege (17)
Home colours	Away colours

During the 1912–13 season Milan Foot-Ball and Cricket Club competed in the Italian Football Championship.

== Summary ==
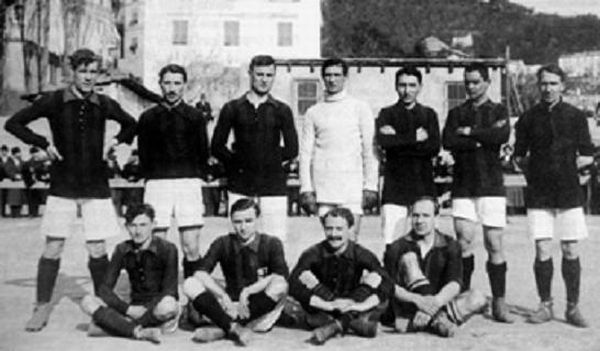
A Milan formation from the 1912-13 season.

With the start of the 1912–13 season, the Italian championship expanded for the first time to teams of the center and south of the country, following the same regional groups formula of the previous years.

Milan won the Liguria-Lombardy group, but was only third in the final group of Northern Italy, won by Pro Vercelli. In the final against Lazio an easy 6–0 victory and yet another title for the Piedmontese team. The basis of the not brilliant results was a new corporate crisis that led Aldo Cevenini and his brothers to leave Milan seeking glory in Internazionale. This led to a consequent weakening of the team, also considering the fact that, in the previous year, Aldo Cevenini had been the best scorer of the Rossoneri. Renzo De Vecchi also left Milan at the beginning of the final round, attracted by the better economic offer of Genoa. The prolific forwards couple Cevenini-Van Hege was not validly replaced.

Van Hege was once again the top scorer of the season, with 17 goals in 18 matches, including four braces and two hat-tricks.

In 1912, Milan changed its headquarters for the second time, moving from the Spatenbräu brewery in via Foscolo 2 to the Franzini brewery in via Mercanti 1.

== Squad ==
Note: Flags indicate national team as defined under FIFA eligibility rules; some limited exceptions apply. Players may hold more than one non-FIFA nationality.

Pos.	Nation	Player
GK	ITA	Luigi Barbieri
GK	ITA	Enrico Malerba
DF	ITA	Renzo De Vecchi
DF	ITA	Marco Sala
MF	ARG	Cesare Lovati
MF	ENG	Emyl Croom
MF	ITA	Giuseppe Rizzi (Captain)
MF	ENG	John Robert Roberts

Pos.	Nation	Player
MF	ITA	Alessandro Scarioni
MF	ITA	Attilio Trerè
FW	URU	Julio Bavastro
FW	ITA	Romolo Ferrario
FW	ITA	Pietro Lana
FW	BEL	Camille Nys
FW	BEL	Louis Van Hege
	ITA	Ulisse Baruffini

== Competitions ==
=== Italian Football Championship ===
==== Liguria-Lombardy group ====
3 November 1912 1	Milan	6–0	US Milanese	Milano
	Ferrario 5'; Nys 15'; Van Hege 25', 35', 71'			Stadium: Campo Milan di Porta Monforte; Referee: Calì

10 November 1912 2	Racing Libertas	1–2	Milan	Milano
	Binaghi 65'		30' Roberts; 90' (pen.) De Vecchi	Stadium: Campo di Via Bersaglio; Referee: Scamoni

17 November 1912 3	Inter	1–2	Milan	Milano
	Bontadini III 42'		40' Rizzi; 46' Van Hege	Stadium: Arena Civica; Referee: Scamoni

24 November 1912 4	Milan	7–0	Andrea Doria	Milano
	Ferrario 19', 49', 51', 84'; Van Hege 55', 66'; Nys 70'			Stadium: Campo Milan di Porta Monforte; Referee: Meazza

19 January 1913 5	Milan	4–0	Genoa	Milano
	Ferrario 19'; Nys 24', 43'; Van Hege 80'			Stadium: Campo Milan di Porta Monforte; Referee: Scamoni

26 January 1913 6	US Milanese	0–2	Milan	Milano
			5' Ferrario; 57' (o.g.) Bruciamonti	Stadium: Campo di via Stelvio; Referee: Calì

2 March 1913 7	Milan	1–0	Racing Libertas	Milano
				Stadium: Campo Milan di Porta Monforte; Referee: Meazza

9 February 1913 8	Milan	1–0	Inter	Milano
	Trerè II 76'			Stadium: Campo Milan di Porta Monforte; Referee: Goodley

16 February 1913 9	Andrea Doria	2–3	Milan	Genova
	Sardi II 10'; Fresia 87' (pen.)		33', 47' Van Hege; 86' Ferrario	Stadium: Campo di Via del Piano; Referee: Goodley

23 February 1913 10	Genoa	4–1	Milan	Genova
	Grant 1', 4', 69'; Mc Pherson 24'		39' Van Hege	Stadium: Campo Genoa Cricket & Football Club; Referee: Resegotti

==== Final group ====
9 March 1913 1	Pro Vercelli	2–0	Milan	Vercelli
	Ara 9'; Zorzoli 46'			Stadium: Comunale di Piazza Conte Torino; Referee: Valvassori

16 March 1913 2	Milan	4–0	Casale	Milano
	Van Hege 58', 69'; Rizzi 74'; Croom 89'			Stadium: Campo Milan di Porta Monforte; Referee: Scamoni

30 March 1913 3	Milan	5–1	Hellas (1907–1918)	Milano
	Lana; Ferrario; Croom (?); Nys		Costa	Stadium: Campo Milan di Porta Monforte; Referee: Goodley

6 April 1913 4	Vicenza	0–3	Milan	Vicenza
			15', 60', 72' Van Hege	Stadium: Borgo Casale; Referee: Tessari

13 April 1913 5	Milan	0–0	Pro Vercelli	Milano
				Stadium: Campo Milan Porta Monforte; Referee: Goodley

20 April 1913 6	Casale	2–0	Milan	Casale Monferrato
	Varese 15'; Serasso 22' (pen.)			Referee: Scamoni

27 April 1913 7	Hellas (1907–1918)	0–3	Milan	Verona
			3' Rizzi; 10' Van Hege	Stadium: Vecchio Bentegodi; Referee: Resegotti

4 May 1913 8	Milan	1–1	Vicenza	Milano
	Croom (?)		(?) Casalini	Stadium: Campo Milan Porta Monforte; Referee: Goodley

== Statistics ==
=== Squad statistics ===
Competition	Points	Home						Away						Total						GD
Competition	Points	G	W	D	L	Gs	Ga	G	W	D	L	Gs	Ga	G	W	D	L	Gs	Ga	GD
1912–13 Prima Categoria	28	9	7	2	0	30	2	9	6	0	3	16	12	18	13	2	3	46	14	+32

=== Players statistics ===
No.	Pos	Nat	Player	Total		Italian Football Championship	
No.	Pos	Nat	Player	Apps	Goals	Apps	Goals
	GK	(Italy) ITA	Luigi Barbieri	17	-13	17	-13
	GK	(Italy) ITA	Enrico Malerba	4	0	4	0
	DF	(Italy) ITA	Marco Sala	17	0	17	0
	DF	(Italy) ITA	Renzo De Vecchi	14	1	14	1
	MF	(Italy) ITA	Alessandro Scarioni	14	0	14	0
	MF	(England) ENG	Emyl Croom	16	0	16	0
	MF	(Italy) ITA	Attilio Trerè	17	4	17	4
	MF	(Argentina) ARG	Cesare Lovati	4	0	4	0
	MF	(Italy) ITA	Giuseppe Rizzi	12	3	12	3
	MF	(England) ENG	John Robert Roberts	18	1	18	1
	FW	(Italy) ITA	Romolo Ferrario	14	10	14	10
	FW	(Italy) ITA	Pietro Lana	5	1	5	1
	FW	(Uruguay) URU	Julio Bavastro	12	0	12	0
	FW	(Belgium) BEL	Camille Nys	18	5	18	5
	FW	(Belgium) BEL	Louis Van Hege	18	17	18	17
		(Italy) ITA	Ulisse Baruffini	0	0	0	0

== See also ==
- AC Milan

== Bibliography ==
- Almanacco illustrato del Milan, ed: 2, March 2005. Panini.
- Enrico Tosi. La storia del Milan, May 2005. Italia/Italy cid Tosi.
- Milan. Sempre con te, December 2009. Mondadori. 2009. ISBN 978-88-04-59118-4.
