= Georges Pootmans =

Georges Pootmans can refer to:

- Georges Pootmans (footballer) (1889-?), Belgian footballer.
- Georges Pootmans (ice hockey) (1917-?), Belgian ice hockey player
