= Van Herp =

Van Herp is a surname. Notable people with the surname include:

- Jacques Van Herp (1923–2004), Belgian writer and publisher of science fiction
- Willem van Herp (1614–1677), Dutch Baroque painter
- Yvo Van Herp (born 1949), Belgian footballer

== See also ==
- Herp (disambiguation)
