= Mariman =

Mariman is a surname. Notable people with the surname include:

- Ludo Mariman
- Rahmad Mariman
- Frank Mariman
