= Maurice Lefebvre =

Maurice Lefebvre can refer to:

- Maurice Lefebvre (footballer)
- Maurice Lefèbvre (water polo)
