= Van Campenhout =

Van Campenhout is a Flemish surname. Notable people with the surname include:

- Félix Van Campenhout (1910–?), Belgian footballer
- François van Campenhout (1779–1848), Belgian opera singer, conductor and composer
- Julien Van Campenhout (1898–1933), Belgian long-distance runner
- Roland Van Campenhout (born 1944), Belgian blues musician
