= Albert Michiels =

Albert Michiels can refer to:

- Albert Michiels (footballer)
- Albert Michiels (wrestler)
