= Verboven =

Verboven is a surname. Notable people with the surname include:

- François Verboven, Belgian gymnast
- Jean Verboven, Belgian gymnast
- Louis Verboven (1909–1967), Belgian footballer
