= List of speakers of the Parliament of the German-speaking Community =

This is a list of the speakers of the Parliament of the German-speaking Community of Belgium, the speakers of the Council of the German-speaking Community and the speakers of the Council of the German Cultural Community since 1973.

No.	Name	Party	Entered office	Left office
1.	Johann Weynand	CSP	October 23, 1973	December 31, 1976
2.	Albert Gehlen	CSP	January 14, 1977	November 8, 1981
3.	Manfred Betsch	CSP	December 1, 1981	January 27, 1985
4.	Kurt Ortmann	CSP	February 11, 1985	October 28, 1990
5.	Mathieu Grosch	CSP	November 13, 1990	August 1, 1994
6.	Manfred Schunck	CSP	September 20, 1994	June 13, 1999
7.	Alfred Evers	PFF	July 6, 1999	June 13, 2004
8.	Ludwig Siquet	SP	July 6, 2004	February 1, 2010
9.	Ferdel Schröder	PFF	February 1, 2010	January 4, 2013
10.	Alexander Miesen	PFF	January 21, 2013	May 25, 2014
11.	Karl-Heinz Lambertz	SP	June 26, 2014	September 19, 2016
(10).	Alexander Miesen	PFF	September 19, 2016	June 17, 2019
(11.)	Karl-Heinz Lambertz	SP	June 17, 2019	January 30, 2023
12.	Charles Servaty	SP	January 30, 2023	July 1, 2024
13.	Patricia Creutz-Vilvoye	CSP	July 1, 2024	Incumbent

== Sources ==
- "The member of the Parliament". The Parliament of the German-speaking Community.
