= Vergeylen =

Vergeylen is a surname. Notable people with the surname include:

- Nico Vergeylen (born 1968), Belgian table tennis player
- Pierre Vergeylen (1891–?), Belgian footballer
