= André Smets =

Belgian politician (1943–2019)

André Smets (5 July 1943 – 30 December 2019) was a Belgian politician, who served as Mayor of Herve from 1985 to 2010. He also sat in the Chamber of Representatives for the Verviers constituency from 1999 to 2003. As a member of parliament he mainly focused on traffic, infrastructure and government-owned companies.

In 1970 he was elected to Herve as a municipal councillor for the then PSC (precursor of the current Centre démocrate humaniste) and from 1977 to 1985 as an alderman. In 1985 he became mayor of the municipality, which he remained until leaving politics at the end of 2010.

Smets was a teacher by profession and from 1975 to 1999 he was head of the Institut Saint-Joseph in Herve.
