= Patricia Creutz-Vilvoye =

Belgian politician (born 1964)

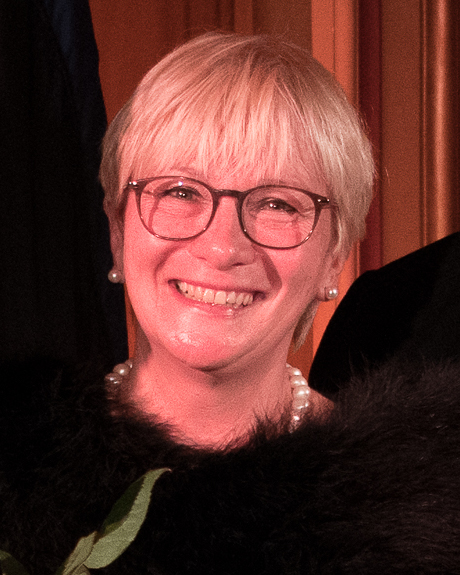
- Creutz-Vilvoye in 2019

Speaker of the Parliament of the German-speaking Community
- Incumbent
- Assumed office 1 July 2024
- Preceded by: Charles Servaty

Member of the Parliament of the German-speaking Community
- Incumbent
- Assumed office 2004

Personal details
- Born: 27 December 1964 (age 61)
- Party: Christian Social

Patricia Creutz-Vilvoye (born 27 December 1964) is a Belgian politician. She has served as the speaker of the Parliament of the German-speaking Community in Belgium since 2024.

== Life and career ==
Creutz-Vilvoye was born on 27 December 1964. She was first elected to the Parliament of the German-speaking Community in 2004.

On 1 July 2024, Creutz-Vilvoye was elected as the speaker of the Parliament of the German-speaking Community. Upon her selection, she became the first woman to hold the office.
