= Herp (disambiguation) =

Herp usually refers to many amphibians and reptiles, as studied in herpetology.

Herp may also refer to:

- Hendrik Herp (died 1477), Franciscan and writer on mysticism
- Joan Herp (born 1993), Spanish sailor

== See also ==
- Van Herp, a surname (with a list of people of this name)
