= Léon d'Andrimont =

Belgian politician (1836–1905)

Victor Léon d'Andrimont (1836–1905) was a Belgian politician and financier.

== Life ==
D'Andrimont was born in Liège on 29 March 1836, the son of the industrialist and politician Julien d'Andrimont. On 2 May 1859 he married baroness Caroline Maria de Moffarts. After studying civil engineering he entered politics, first in the province of Limburg and from the partial legislative elections of 1878 as a Liberal Party member of the Belgian parliament for the Verviers constituency. He retained his seat until 1894, and in 1900 was elected to the Belgian Senate, again from Verviers.

His social concerns had led him to found the Banque Populaire credit union in Liège on 1 June 1864. He went on to become the president of a credit federation. He was also involved in the oversight of mutual insurance societies and vocational schools in Liège. He died in Brussels on 9 April 1905.

== Works ==
- Des institutions et des associations ouvrières de la Belgique (1871)
- La philanthropie sociale à l'Exposition universelle de Vienne en 1873 (1874)
- La coopération ouvrière en Belgique (1876)
- La Question consulaire en Belgique (1885)
