= Marcel Dries =

Belgian footballer

- Dries with Belgium

Personal information
- Date of birth: 19 September 1929
- Place of birth: Berchem, Belgium
- Date of death: 27 September 2011 (aged 82)
- Place of death: Antwerp, Belgium
- Position: Defender

Youth career
- 1941–1947: Berchem Sport

Senior career*
Years	Team	Apps	(Gls)
1947–1960	Berchem Sport		
1960–1963	Union Saint-Gilloise		
1963–1966	KV Kortrijk		

International career
1953–1959	Belgium	31	(0)
- * Club domestic league appearances and goals

Marcel Dries (19 September 1929 – 27 September 2011) was a Belgian international footballer who played as a defender.

== Career ==
Born in Antwerp, Dries played club football for Berchem Sport, Union Saint-Gilloise and KV Kortrijk.

He earned a total of 31 caps for Belgium between 1953 and 1959, and participated at the 1954 FIFA World Cup.

== Personal life ==
His father Léopold also played for Berchem Sport and earned 3 caps for Belgium in the 1920s.

== Honours ==
Berchem Sport

- Belgian First Division Runners-up: 1948–49, 1949–50, 1950–51
