= Mathieu Grosch =

Belgian politician (born 1950)

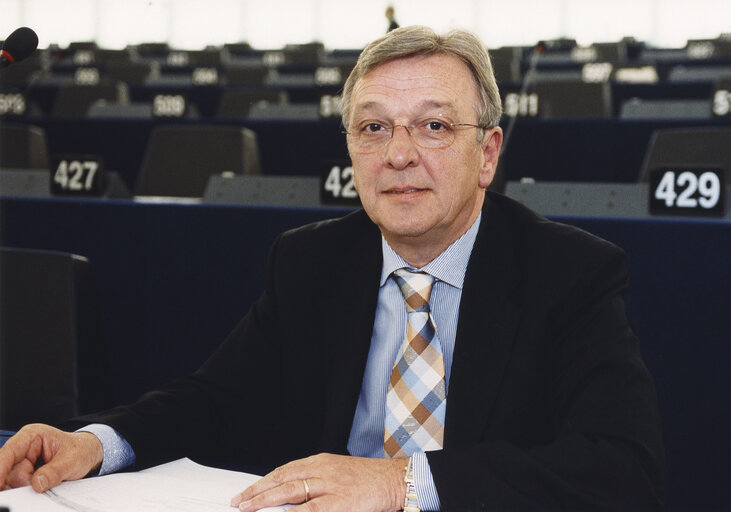

Speaker of Parliament of the German Community
- In office 13 November 1990 – 1 August 1994
- Preceded by: Kurt Ortmann
- Succeeded by: Manfred Schunck

Personal details
- Born: 15 September 1950 (age 76) Eupen, Belgium
- Party: Christian Social Party
- Education: University of Liège

Mathieu Jean Hubert Grosch (born 14 September 1950, in Eupen) is a Belgian politician and Member of the European Parliament for the German-speaking Community of Belgium with the CSP-EVP, Member of the Bureau of the European People's Party and sits on the European Parliament's Committee on Transport and Tourism.

He is a substitute for the Committee on Regional Development, a member of the Delegation to the EU-Mexico Joint Parliamentary Committee and a substitute for the Delegation for relations with Japan.

== Education ==
- 1973: Germanic languages, University of Liège
- 1974: Accredited upper school teacher

== Career ==
- 1974–1981: teacher of English and German
- 1986–present: Member of the national bureau of the CSP
- 1994–present: Member of the EPP bureau
- 1981–1984: Adviser to the Prime Minister
- 1984–1985: Member of the provincial council
- 1986–1994: Member of Council, German-speaking Community
- 1986–1990: Government minister, German-speaking Community
- 1990–1994: Chairman of Council, German-speaking Community
- 1991–2012: Mayor of Kelmis
- 1994–2014: Member of the European Parliament
- Member of the Robert Schuman Foundation
- 1996–present: Member of the board of Bierset-Liège airport

== Decorations ==
- 1999: Merit award of the Meuse-Rhine Euregio
- 1999: Commander of the Order of Leopold (Belgium)
- 2004: Order of Merit of the Federal Republic of Germany, First Class

Political offices
Preceded by Kurt Ortmann	Speaker of the Parliament of the German Community; 1990–1994	Succeeded by Manfred Schunck
European Parliament
New constituency	Member of the European Parliament for the German-speaking electoral college 1994–2014	Succeeded by Pascal Arimont
