= Clément Demeyer =

Belgian footballer

Personal information
- Date of birth: 1 September 1889

International career
Years	Team	Apps	(Gls)
1912–1913	Belgium	3	(0)

Clément Demeyer (born 1 September 1889, date of death unknown) was a Belgian footballer. He played in three matches for the Belgium national football team from 1912 to 1913.
