= Joseph Homble =

Belgian footballer

Personal information
- Date of birth: 26 September 1915

International career
Years	Team	Apps	(Gls)
1947	Belgium	1	(0)

Joseph Homble (born 26 September 1915, date of death unknown) was a Belgian footballer. He played in one match for the Belgium national football team in 1947.
