= Willy Vermeulen =

Belgian footballer (1919–1956)

Personal information
- Date of birth: 1 September 1919
- Date of death: 30 November 1956 (aged 37)

International career
Years	Team	Apps	(Gls)
1946–1947	Belgium	2	(0)

Willy Vermeulen (1 September 1919 – 30 November 1956) was a Belgian footballer. He played in two matches for the Belgium national football team from 1946 to 1947.
