= Léon Rosper =

Belgian footballer

Personal information
- Date of birth: 14 January 1899

International career
Years	Team	Apps	(Gls)
1927	Belgium	1	(0)

Léon Rosper (born 14 January 1899, date of death unknown) was a Belgian footballer. He played in one match for the Belgium national football team in 1927.
