= Jean Strubbe =

Belgian footballer

Personal information
- Date of birth: 29 December 1887
- Date of death: 13 December 1936 (aged 48)

International career
Years	Team	Apps	(Gls)
1911	Belgium	1	(0)

Jean Strubbe (29 December 1887 – 13 December 1936) was a Belgian footballer. He played in one match for the Belgium national football team in 1911.
