= Robert Weyn =

Belgian footballer

Personal information
- Date of birth: 21 March 1940 (age 86)

International career
Years	Team	Apps	(Gls)
1965	Belgium	1	(0)

Robert Weyn (born 21 March 1940) is a Belgian footballer. He played in one match for the Belgium national football team in 1965.
