= Pierre Weydisch =

Belgian footballer

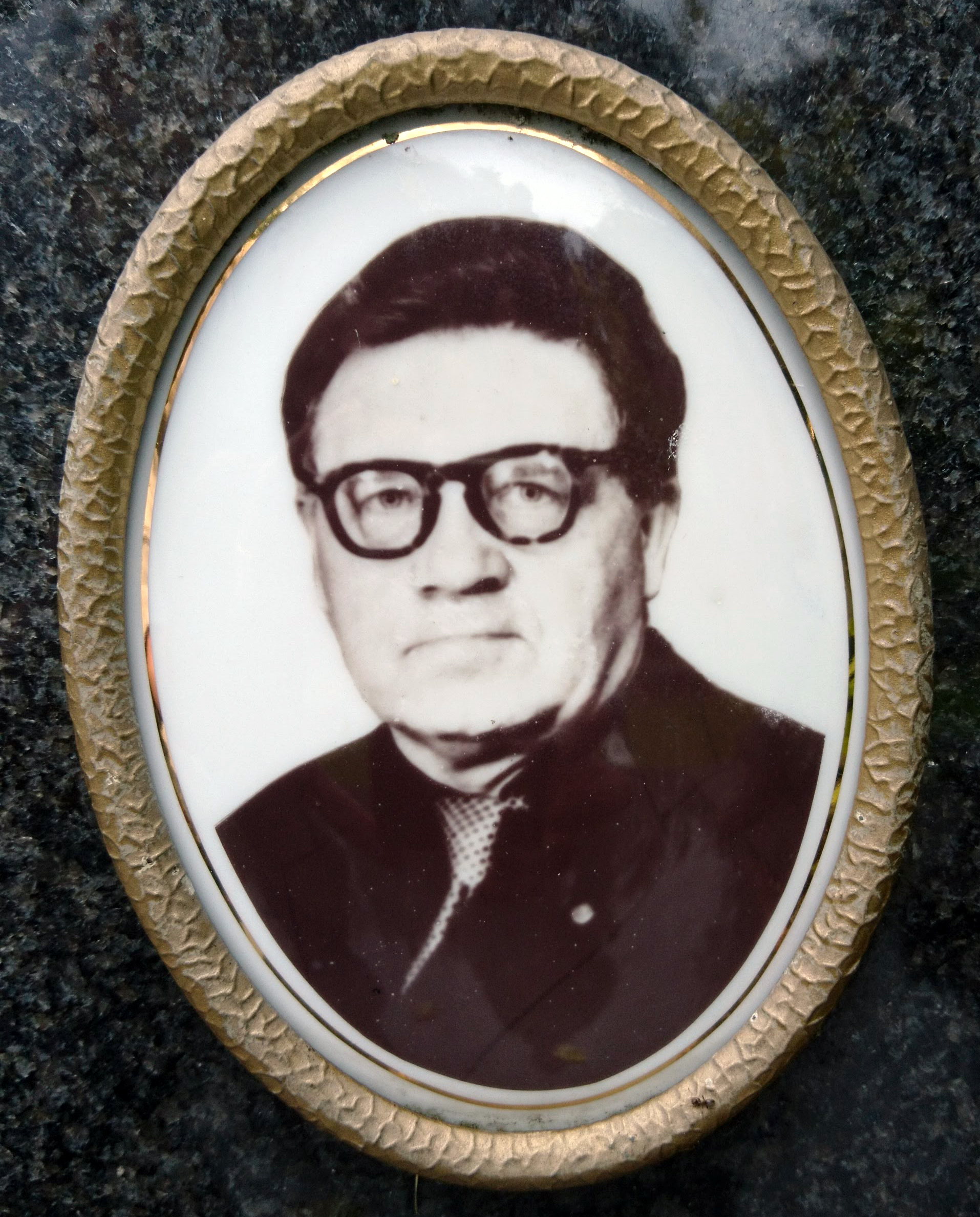
- Photo of Pierre Weydisch on his tombstone

Personal information
- Date of birth: 30 March 1908

International career
Years	Team	Apps	(Gls)
1933	Belgium	1	(0)

Pierre Weydisch (born 30 March 1908, date of death unknown) was a Belgian footballer. He played in one match for the Belgium national football team in 1933.
