= Léopold Dries =

Belgian footballer

Personal information
- Date of birth: 27 September 1901
- Place of birth: Berchem, Belgium
- Date of death: 12 August 1960 (aged 58)
- Place of death: Berchem, Belgium

Senior career*
Years	Team	Apps	(Gls)
1920–1933	Berchem Sport	229	(64)

International career
1924–1925	Belgium	3	(0)
- * Club domestic league appearances and goals

Léopold Dries (27 September 1901 – 12 August 1960) was a Belgian footballer.

Dries played in three matches for the Belgium national football team from 1924 to 1925 and was the first Berchem Sport player to play for the national team.

== Personal life ==
His son Marcel also played for Berchem Sport and earned 31 caps for Belgium.
