= Robert Theissen =

Luxembourgish footballer (1906–1963)

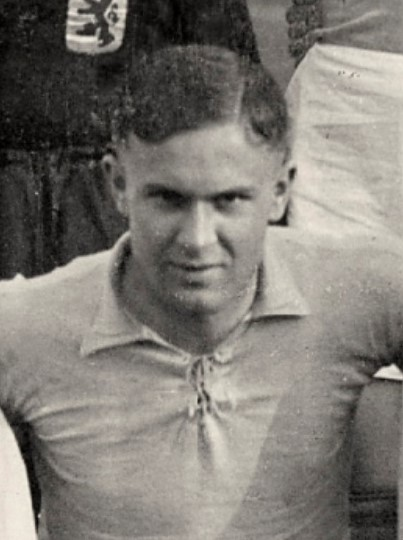
- Robert Theissen in 1928

Personal information
- Date of birth: 20 July 1906
- Place of birth: Luxembourg City, Luxembourg
- Date of death: 13 February 1963 (aged 56)
- Place of death: Luxembourg City, Luxembourg

International career
Years	Team	Apps	(Gls)
- Luxembourg

Robert Theissen (20 July 1906 – 13 February 1963) was a Luxembourgish footballer. He competed in the men's tournament at the 1928 Summer Olympics.
