= Robert Heyse =

Belgian footballer (1908–1977)

Personal information
- Date of birth: 10 May 1908
- Date of death: 7 July 1977 (aged 69)
- Position: Midfielder

International career
Years	Team	Apps	(Gls)
1928	Belgium	1	(0)

Robert Heyse (10 May 1908 – 7 July 1977) was a Belgian footballer who played as a midfielder. He made one appearance for the Belgium national team in 1928.
