= Guillaume Vanden Houten =

Belgian footballer

Personal information
- Date of birth: 3 April 1893

International career
Years	Team	Apps	(Gls)
1921	Belgium	1	(0)

Guillaume Vanden Houten (born 3 April 1893, date of death unknown) was a Belgian footballer. He played in one match for the Belgium national football team in 1921.
