= Joseph Robyn =

Belgian footballer

Personal information
- Date of birth: 1884
- Date of death: 27 February 1931 (aged 46–47)
- Position: Defender

International career
Years	Team	Apps	(Gls)
1907–1912	Belgium	4	(0)

Joseph Robyn (1884 – 27 February 1931) was a Belgian footballer. He played in four matches for the Belgium national football team from 1907 to 1912.
