= Robert Chapey =

Belgian footballer

Personal information
- Position: Goalkeeper

International career
Years	Team	Apps	(Gls)
1912	Belgium	1	(0)

Robert Chapey was a Belgian footballer. He played in one match for the Belgium national football team in 1912.
