= Prosper Brandsteert =

Belgian footballer

International career
Years	Team	Apps	(Gls)
1905	Belgium	1	(0)

Prosper Brandsteert was a Belgian footballer. He played in one match for the Belgium national football team in 1905.
