= Frans Vanden Ouden =

Belgian footballer

Personal information
- Date of birth: 23 January 1904
- Date of death: 20 November 1974 (aged 70)

International career
| Years | Team | Apps | (Gls) |
| 1925 | Belgium | 1 | (0) |

Frans Vanden Ouden (23 January 1904 – 20 November 1974) was a Belgian footballer. He played in one match for the Belgium national football team in 1925.
