= Albert De Raedt =

Belgian footballer

Personal information
- Date of birth: 22 July 1918
- Date of death: 17 April 1992 (aged 73)

International career
Years	Team	Apps	(Gls)
1939–1940	Belgium	4	(0)

Albert De Raedt (22 July 1918 – 17 April 1992) was a Belgian footballer. He played in four matches for the Belgium national football team from 1939 to 1940.
