= Julien Van Puymbroeck =

Belgian footballer

Personal information
- Date of birth: 18 August 1947 (age 79)

International career
Years	Team	Apps	(Gls)
1969	Belgium	1	(0)

Julien Van Puymbroeck (born 18 August 1947) is a Belgian footballer. He played in one match for the Belgium national football team in 1969.
