= Alfons Haagdoren =

Belgian footballer

Personal information
- Date of birth: 1 June 1943 (age 83)

International career
Years	Team	Apps	(Gls)
1967	Belgium	1	(0)

Alfons Haagdoren (born 1 June 1943) is a Belgian footballer. He played in one match for the Belgium national football team in 1967.
