= Guillaume Meulders =

Belgian footballer

Personal information
- Date of birth: 15 April 1888

International career
Years	Team	Apps	(Gls)
1908	Belgium	1	(0)

Guillaume Meulders (born 15 April 1888, date of death unknown) was a Belgian footballer. He played in one match for the Belgium national football team in 1908.
