= Jacques Culot =

Belgian footballer (1933–2018)

Personal information
- Date of birth: 5 August 1933
- Place of birth: Charleroi, Belgium
- Date of death: 6 December 2018 (aged 85)
- Position: Defender

International career
Years	Team	Apps	(Gls)
1957	Belgium	2	(0)

Jacques Culot (5 August 1933 – 6 December 2018) was a Belgian footballer. He played in two matches for the Belgium national football team in 1957. Culot died on 6 December 2018, at the age of 85.
