= Jules Quoilin =

Belgian footballer

Personal information
- Date of birth: 5 February 1929

International career
Years	Team	Apps	(Gls)
1954	Belgium	1	(0)

Jules Quoilin (born 5 February 1929) was a Belgian footballer. He played in one match for the Belgium national football team in 1954.
