= Henri Woestad =

Belgian footballer

Personal information
- Date of birth: 6 January 1911

International career
Years	Team	Apps	(Gls)
1932	Belgium	1	(0)

Henri Woestad (born 6 January 1911, date of death unknown) was a Belgian footballer. He played in one match for the Belgium national football team in 1932.
