= John Lodts =

Belgian footballer

Personal information
- Date of birth: 23 September 1916
- Date of death: 16 February 1937 (aged 20)

International career
Years	Team	Apps	(Gls)
1936	Belgium	1	(0)

John Lodts (23 September 1916 – 16 February 1937) was a Belgian footballer. He played in one match for the Belgium national football team in 1936.
