= Jules Timmermans =

Belgian footballer

Personal information
- Date of birth: 3 March 1903

International career
Years	Team	Apps	(Gls)
1927–1928	Belgium	3	(0)

Jules Timmermans (born 3 March 1903, date of death unknown) was a Belgian footballer. He played in three matches for the Belgium national football team from 1927 to 1928.
