= Arthur Cambier =

Belgian footballer

Personal information
- Date of birth: 30 August 1882
- Place of birth: Bruges, Belgium

International career
Years	Team	Apps	(Gls)
1907	Belgium	1	(0)

Arthur Cambier (born 30 August 1882, date of death unknown) was a Belgian footballer. He played in one match for the Belgium national football team in 1907.
