= René Ledent =

Belgian footballer

Personal information
- Date of birth: 8 November 1907
- Place of birth: Belgium
- Date of death: unknown
- Place of death: Belgium
- Position: Striker

Senior career*
Years	Team	Apps	(Gls)
1926–1936	Standard de Liège		

International career
1928–1934	Belgium	3	(0)
- * Club domestic league appearances and goals

René Ledent (born 8 November 1907, date of death unknown) was a Belgian footballer who was in Belgium’s squad for the 1934 FIFA World Cup. Ledent is deceased.

== Biography ==
He was a striker at Standard de Liège, before World War II. He scored 69 goals in 188 league matches and was Belgian runner-up 1928 with the Rouches.

He played 3 matches for the Diables Rouges. He was selected for the 1934 Italy World Cup, but did not play.

== Honours ==
- Belgian international from 1928 to 1934 (3 caps)
- First international match: 8 January 1928, Belgium-Austria (1–2)
- Picked for 1934 World Cup in Italy (did not play)
- Belgian runner-up 1928 with Standard de Liège
