= René Schietse =

Belgian footballer

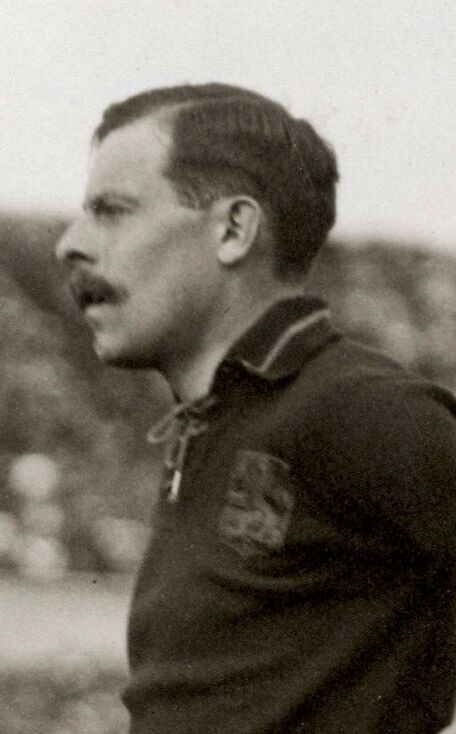

Personal information
- Date of birth: 11 July 1889
- Date of death: 6 January 1955 (aged 65)

International career
Years	Team	Apps	(Gls)
1911–1914	Belgium	2	(0)

René Schietse (11 July 1889 – 6 January 1955) was a Belgian footballer. He played in two matches for the Belgium national football team from 1911 to 1914.
