= Charles Demunter =

Belgian footballer

Personal information
- Date of birth: 12 January 1897

International career
Years	Team	Apps	(Gls)
1924	Belgium	1	(0)

Charles Demunter (born 12 January 1897, date of death unknown) was a Belgian footballer. He played in one match for the Belgium national football team in 1924.
