= Georges Bonhivers =

Belgian footballer

Personal information
- Date of birth: 2 March 1900
- Position: Midfielder

International career
Years	Team	Apps	(Gls)
1927	Belgium	1	(0)

Georges Bonhivers (born 2 March 1900, date of death unknown) was a Belgian footballer. He played in one match for the Belgium national football team in 1927.
