= Carl Fourneaux =

Belgian footballer

International career
Years	Team	Apps	(Gls)
1907	Belgium	1	(0)

Carl Fourneaux was a Belgian footballer. He played in one match for the Belgium national football team in 1907.
