= Robert Willems =

Belgian footballer (born 1935)

Personal information
- Full name: Robert Henri Mathilde Willems
- Date of birth: 6 May 1935 (age 91)
- Place of birth: Lier, Belgium
- Height: 1.78 m (5 ft 10 in)
- Position: Midfielder

Senior career*
Years	Team	Apps	(Gls)
- Lierse
- Dessel

International career
1965	Belgium	1	(0)
- * Club domestic league appearances and goals

Robert Henri Mathilde Willems (born 6 May 1935) is a Belgian former footballer who played as a midfielder. He made one appearance for the Belgium national team in 1965.
