= Edouard Morlet =

Belgian footballer

Personal information
- Date of birth: 24 June 1898

International career
Years	Team	Apps	(Gls)
1923–1924	Belgium	3	(0)

Edouard Morlet (born 24 June 1898, date of death unknown) was a Belgian footballer. He played in three matches for the Belgium national football team from 1923 to 1924.
