= François Moucheron =

Belgian footballer

Personal information
- Date of birth: 23 May 1896

International career
Years	Team	Apps	(Gls)
1919–1921	Belgium	4	(0)

François Moucheron (born 23 May 1896, date of death unknown) was a Belgian footballer. He played in four matches for the Belgium national football team from 1919 to 1921.
