= Clément Robyn =

Belgian footballer

International career
Years	Team	Apps	(Gls)
1905–1907	Belgium	2	(0)

Clément Robyn was a Belgian footballer. He played in two matches for the Belgium national football team from 1905 to 1907.
