= Jean Jamers =

Belgian footballer

Personal information
- Date of birth: 24 November 1907
- Date of death: 12 March 1970 (aged 62)

International career
Years	Team	Apps	(Gls)
1935–1936	Belgium	2	(0)

Jean Jamers (24 November 1907 – 12 March 1970) was a Belgian footballer. He played in two matches for the Belgium national football team from 1935 to 1936.
