= Théo Lacroix =

Belgian footballer

Personal information
- Date of birth: 2 October 1922

International career
Years	Team	Apps	(Gls)
1949	Belgium	1	(0)

Théo Lacroix (born 2 October 1922) was a Belgian footballer. He played in one match for the Belgium national football team in 1949.
