= Fernand Brichant =

Belgian footballer

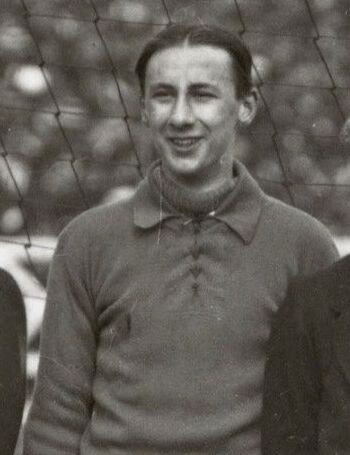

Personal information
- Date of birth: 1 February 1895
- Position: Goalkeeper

International career
Years	Team	Apps	(Gls)
1914	Belgium	2	(0)

Fernand Brichant (born 1 February 1895, date of death unknown) was a Belgian footballer. He played in two matches for the Belgium national football team in 1914.
