= Gilbert Marnette =

Belgian footballer (1931–1993)

Personal information
- Date of birth: 17 May 1931
- Date of death: 17 May 1993 (aged 62)

International career
Years	Team	Apps	(Gls)
1958	Belgium	1	(0)

Gilbert Marnette (17 May 1931 – 17 May 1993) was a Belgian footballer. He played in one match for the Belgium national football team in 1958. Marnette died on 17 May 1993, his 62nd birthday.
