= Gustave Van Goethem =

Belgian footballer

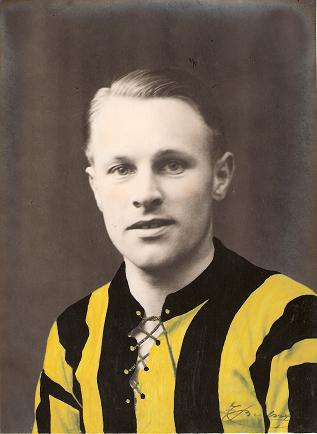

Personal information
- Date of birth: 28 December 1898
- Place of birth: Berchem, Belgium
- Date of death: 15 October 1974 (aged 75)

International career
Years	Team	Apps	(Gls)
1924	Belgium	1	(0)

Gustave Van Goethem (28 December 1898 – 15 October 1974) was a Belgian footballer. He played in one match for the Belgium national football team in 1924.
