= Léon Lefèvre =

Luxembourgish footballer

Personal information
- Date of birth: 28 November 1904

International career
Years	Team	Apps	(Gls)
1922-1927	Luxembourg	8	(3)

Léon Lefèvre (born 28 November 1904, date of death unknown) was a Luxembourgish footballer. He played in eight matches for the Luxembourg national football team between 1922 and 1927.
