= Jacques Sterckval =

Belgian footballer

Personal information
- Date of birth: 9 August 1884

International career
Years	Team	Apps	(Gls)
1909	Belgium	2	(0)

Jacques Sterckval (born 9 August 1884, date of death unknown) was a Belgian footballer. He played in two matches for the Belgium national football team in 1909.
