= Robert Deurwaerder =

Belgian footballer

Personal information
- Date of birth: 19 September 1941 (age 85)

International career
Years	Team	Apps	(Gls)
1963	Belgium	1	(0)

Robert Deurwaerder (born 19 September 1941) is a Belgian footballer. He played in one match for the Belgium national football team in 1963.
