= Roland Moyson =

Belgian footballer

Personal information
- Date of birth: 13 April 1934 (age 92)
- Place of birth: Brussels, Belgium

International career
Years	Team	Apps	(Gls)
1956	Belgium	1	(1)

Roland Moyson (born 13 April 1934) is a Belgian former footballer. He played in one match for the Belgium national football team in 1956.
