= Jules Mayné =

Belgian footballer

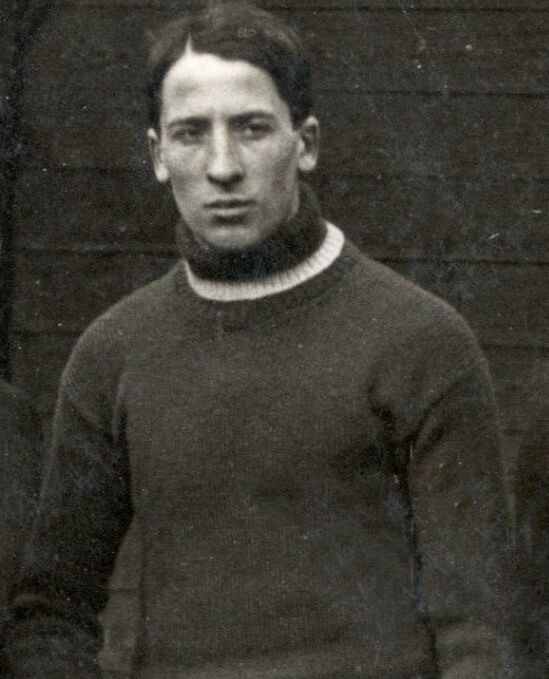

Personal information
- Date of birth: 15 August 1892
- Date of death: 30 May 1977 (aged 84)

International career
Years	Team	Apps	(Gls)
1912–1913	Belgium	3	(0)

Jules Mayné (15 August 1892 – 30 May 1977) was a Belgian footballer. He played in three matches for the Belgium national football team from 1912 to 1913.
