= Clément Keerstock =

Belgian footballer

Personal information
- Date of birth: 12 October 1902

International career
Years	Team	Apps	(Gls)
1927	Belgium	3	(0)

Clément Keerstock (born 12 October 1902, date of death unknown) was a Belgian footballer. He played in three matches for the Belgium national football team in 1927.
