= Jan Diddens =

Belgian footballer

Jan Philippe Diddens

Personal information
- Date of birth: 14 September 1906
- Place of birth: Mechelen, Belgium
- Date of death: 31 July 1972 (aged 65)

Senior career*
Years	Team	Apps	(Gls)
1922–1934	K.R.C. Mechelen		

International career
1926–1930	Belgium	23	(2)
- * Club domestic league appearances and goals

Jan Diddens is a Belgian footballer, born 14 September 1906 in Mechelen (Belgium), died 31 July 1972.

Striker for Racing malinois and Belgium, he played two matches in the Olympic tournament in 1928 in Amsterdam, and two matches at the first World Cup in 1930 in Montevideo.

== Honours ==
- International from 1926 to 1930 (23 caps, 2 goals)
- Participation in the 1928 Olympic Games (2 matches)
- Participation in the 1930 World Cup (2 matches)
- Promotion to D1 in 1925 with K.R.C. Mechelen
