= Victor Michiels =

Belgian footballer

Personal information
- Date of birth: 6 January 1906

International career
Years	Team	Apps	(Gls)
1928	Belgium	1	(0)

Victor Michiels (born 6 January 1906, date of death unknown) was a Belgian footballer. He played in one match for the Belgium national football team in 1928.
