= Robert Elter =

Luxembourgish footballer

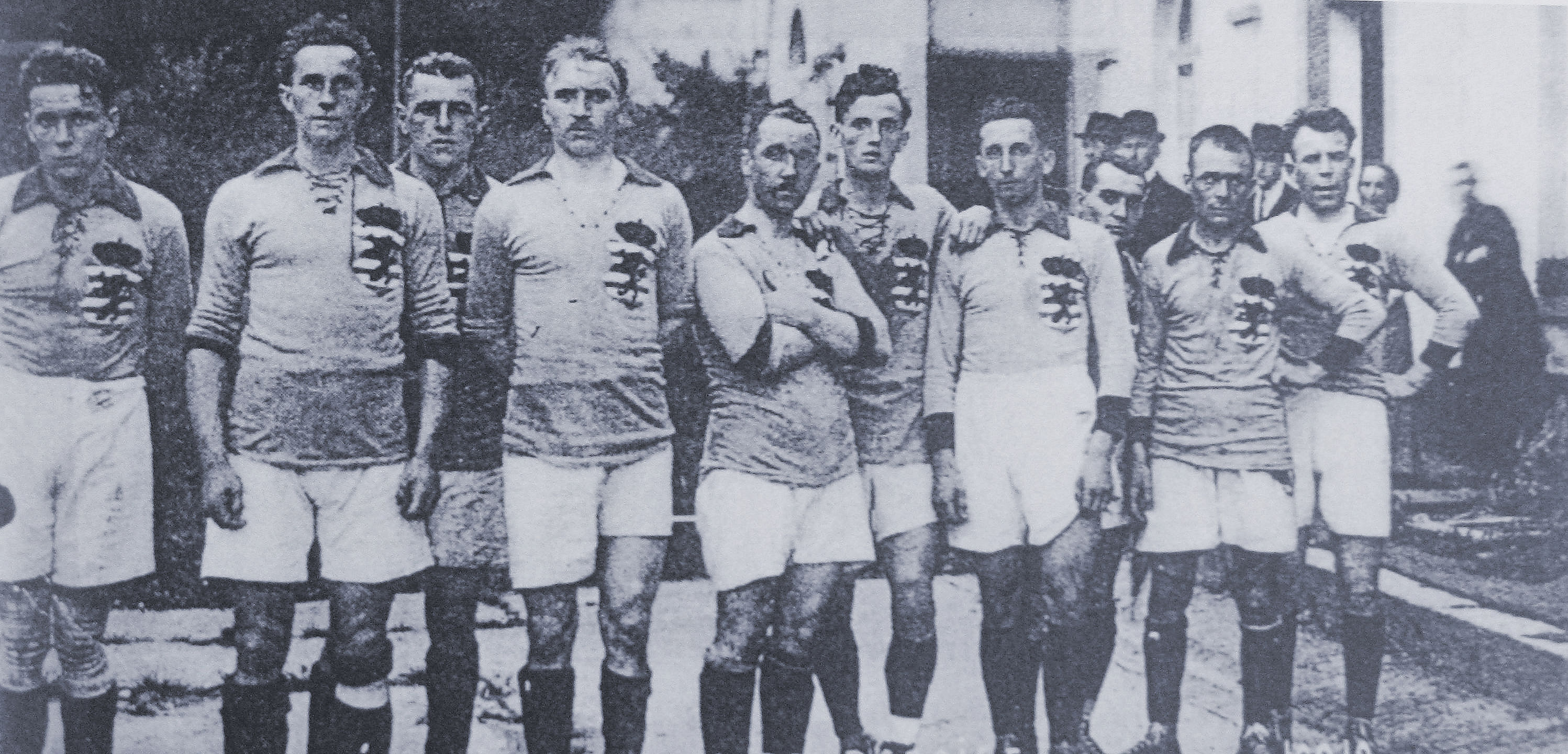

Personal information
- Date of birth: 20 April 1899
- Place of birth: Luxembourg, Luxembourg
- Date of death: 2 May 1991 (aged 92)
- Place of death: Luxembourg, Luxembourg

International career
Years	Team	Apps	(Gls)
- Luxembourg

Robert Elter (20 April 1899 – 2 May 1991) was a Luxembourgish footballer and notary. He competed in the men's tournament at the 1920 Summer Olympics.
