= Louis Joux =

Belgian footballer

Personal information
- Date of birth: 6 February 1888

International career
Years	Team	Apps	(Gls)
1908–1910	Belgium	2	(0)

Louis Joux (born 6 February 1888, date of death unknown) was a Belgian footballer. He played in two matches for the Belgium national football team from 1908 to 1910.
