= Alfons Dresen =

Belgian footballer (1931–2022)

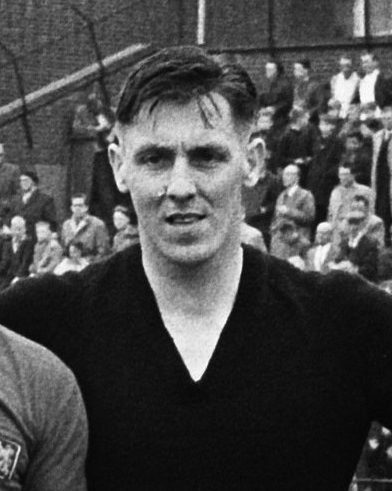
- Dresen in 1963

Personal information
- Date of birth: 24 July 1931
- Place of birth: Lier, Belgium
- Date of death: 27 August 2022 (aged 91)
- Position: Goalkeeper

International career
Years	Team	Apps	(Gls)
1955–1956	Belgium	4	(0)

Alfons Dresen (24 July 1931 – 27 August 2022) was a Belgian footballer. He played in four matches for the Belgium national football team in 1955 and 1956. Dresen died on 27 August 2022, at the age of 91.
