= Florent Bohez =

Belgian footballer

Personal information
- Date of birth: 19 January 1941 (age 85)
- Position: Defender

Senior career*
Years	Team	Apps	(Gls)
- Royal Antwerp

International career
1967	Belgium	3	(0)
- * Club domestic league appearances and goals

Florent Bohez (born 19 January 1941) is a Belgian footballer. He played in three matches for the Belgium national football team in 1967.
