= Henri Dedecker =

Belgian footballer

Personal information
- Date of death: 6 January 1935

International career
Years	Team	Apps	(Gls)
1905	Belgium	2	(0)

Henri Dedecker (died 6 January 1935) was a Belgian footballer. He played in two matches for the Belgium national football team in 1905.
