= Théo Van Rooy =

Belgian footballer

Personal information
- Date of birth: 2 October 1934 (age 92)

International career
Years	Team	Apps	(Gls)
1957	Belgium	4	(0)

Théo Van Rooy (born 2 October 1934) is a Belgian footballer. He played in four matches for the Belgium national football team in 1957.
