= Ronald Foguenne =

Belgian footballer

Personal information
- Date of birth: 10 August 1970 (age 56)
- Place of birth: Dolhain, Belgium
- Height: 1.80 m (5 ft 11 in)
- Position: Midfielder

Youth career
- Union Limbourg

Senior career*
Years	Team	Apps	(Gls)
1990–1993	RFC Liège	70	(7)
1993–1994	Sérésien	29	(3)
1994–1995	AA Gent	29	(4)
1995–1996	Standard Liège	28	(4)
1996–2000	AA Gent	92	(14)
2000–2002	Charleroi	12	(0)
2002–2005	Verviers	41	(6)
Total		301	(38)

International career
1995	Belgium	2	(0)
- * Club domestic league appearances and goals

Ronald Foguenne (born 10 August 1970) is a Belgian retired footballer.

Born in Dolhain-Limbourg, Foguenne had two spells with AA Gent before leaving them for Charleroi in summer 2000.

He played in two matches for the Belgium national football team in 1995.
