= Francis Nicolay =

Belgian footballer

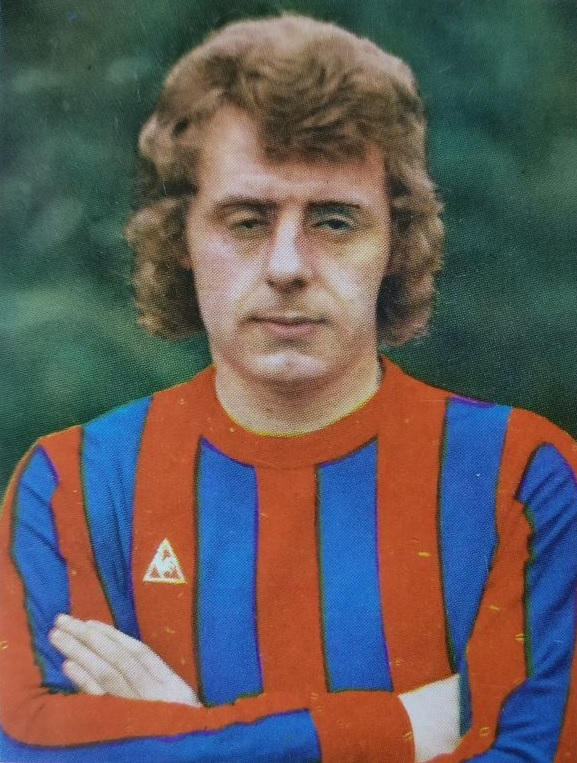
- Nicolay in 1972.

Personal information
- Date of birth: 23 April 1944
- Date of death: July 2002 (aged 58)

International career
Years	Team	Apps	(Gls)
1974	Belgium	1	(0)

Francis Nicolay (born 23 April 1944) is a Belgian footballer. He played in one match for the Belgium national football team in 1974.
