= Adolphe Becquevort =

Belgian footballer

Personal information
- Date of birth: 9 May 1891

International career
Years	Team	Apps	(Gls)
1913	Belgium	2	(0)

Adolphe Becquevort (born 9 May 1891, date of death unknown) was a Belgian footballer. He played in two matches for the Belgium national football team in 1913.
