= Joseph Coenegracht =

Belgian footballer

Personal information
- Date of birth: 15 October 1903
- Position: Midfielder

International career
Years	Team	Apps	(Gls)
1928	Belgium	1	(0)

Joseph Coenegracht (born 15 October 1903, date of death unknown) was a Belgian footballer. He played in one match for the Belgium national football team in 1928.
