= Jos Koetz =

Luxembourgish footballer

Personal information
- Full name: Joseph Koetz
- Date of birth: 29 May 1897
- Place of birth: Esch-sur-Alzette, Luxembourg
- Date of death: 13 June 1976 (aged 79)
- Place of death: Esch-sur-Alzette, Luxembourg
- Position: Defender

Senior career*
Years	Team	Apps	(Gls)
- CS Fola Esch

International career
	Luxembourg	11	(1)
- * Club domestic league appearances and goals

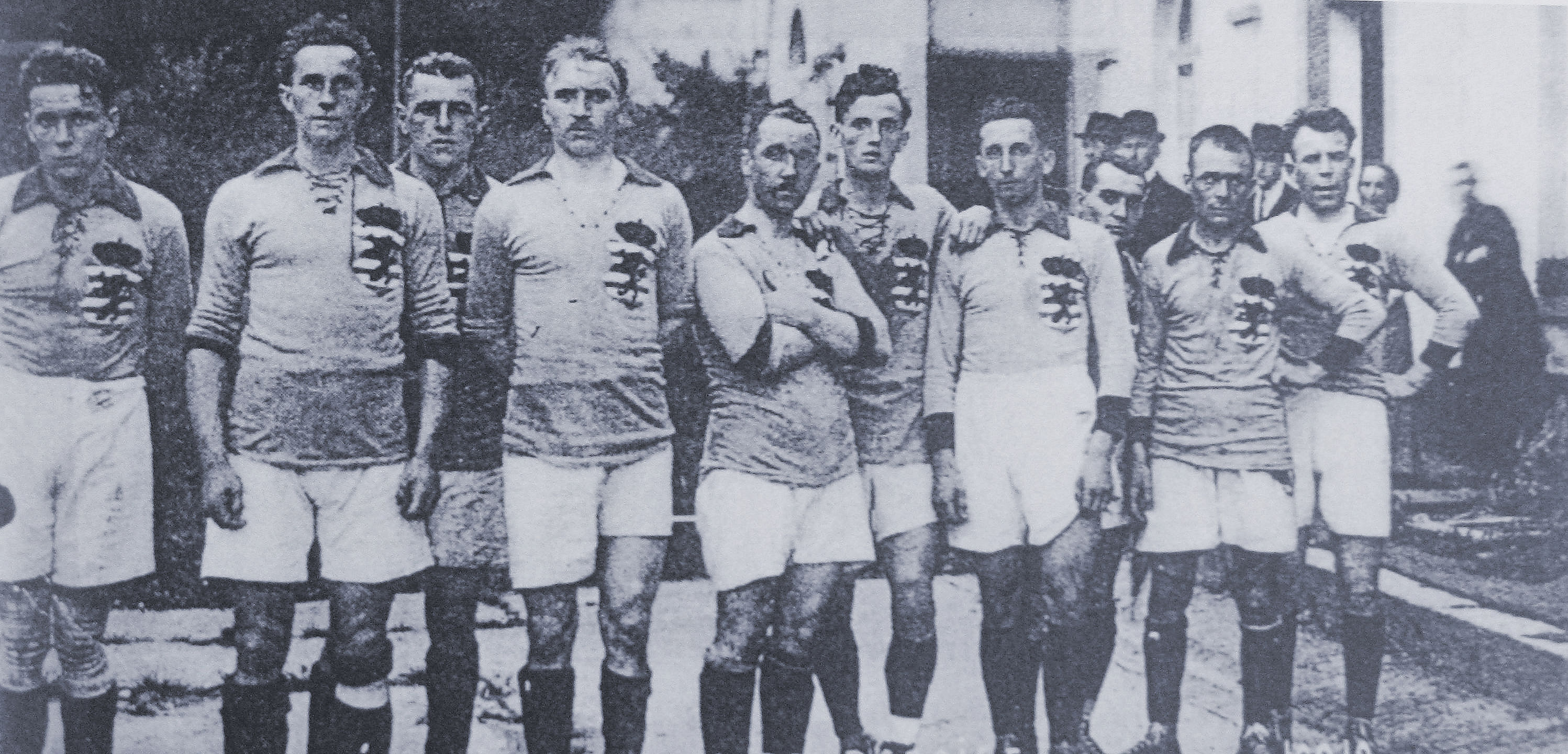

Joseph "Jos" Koetz (29 May 1897 in Esch-sur-Alzette – 13 June 1976) was a footballer from Luxembourg who participated at two Summer Olympics, 1920 and 1924. He was also part of the squad for the 1928 tournament, but did not play. Most of his career he played for CS Fola Esch.
