= Émile Reuse =

Belgian footballer

Personal information
- Date of birth: 7 November 1883
- Date of death: 6 June 1975 (aged 91)

International career
Years	Team	Apps	(Gls)
1907–1910	Belgium	2	(0)

Émile Reuse (7 November 1883 – 6 June 1975) was a Belgian footballer. He played in two matches for the Belgium national football team from 1907 to 1910.
