= Xavier Caers =

Belgian footballer

Personal information
- Date of birth: 5 February 1950 (age 76)

International career
Years	Team	Apps	(Gls)
1975	Belgium	1	(0)

Xavier Caers (born 5 February 1950) is a Belgian footballer. He played in one match for the Belgium national football team in 1975.
