= Edouard Van Brandt =

Belgian footballer

Personal information
- Date of birth: 27 March 1911
- Date of death: 21 February 1943 (aged 31)

International career
| Years | Team | Apps | (Gls) |
| 1932 | Belgium | 2 | (0) |

Edouard Van Brandt (27 March 1911 – 21 February 1943) was a Belgian footballer. He played in two matches for the Belgium national football team in 1932.
