= Godefroid Van Melderen =

Belgian footballer

International career
Years	Team	Apps	(Gls)
1909	Belgium	2	(0)

Godefroid Van Melderen was a Belgian footballer. He played in two matches for the Belgium national football team in 1909.
