= Guido Nicolaes =

Belgian footballer

Personal information
- Date of birth: 15 July 1950 (age 76)
- Place of birth: Tienen, Belgium

Youth career
- 1960-1967: KSC Hoegaarden
- 1967-1969: Anderlecht

Senior career*
Years	Team	Apps	(Gls)
1968–1969	→ Diest (loan)		
1969–1970	Tienen		
1970–1972	Olympic Charleroi		
1972–1974	Beerschot VAV		
1974–1975	Anderlecht	15	(4)
1975–1978	RFC Liège		
1978–1979	KSC Hoegaarden		
1979–1982	Tienen		
1982–1983	Hannutois		
1983–1985	KSC Hoegaarden		
1985–1988	Toekomst Bunsbeek		
1988–1992	RC Meldert		

International career
1974	Belgium	2	(0)
- * Club domestic league appearances and goals

Guido Nicolaes (born 15 July 1950) is a Belgian footballer. He played in two matches for the Belgium national football team in 1974.
