= Charles De Vogelaere =

Belgian footballer (1933–2017)

Personal information
- Date of birth: 16 November 1933
- Date of death: 18 April 2017 (aged 83)
- Place of death: Laeken, Belgium

International career
Years	Team	Apps	(Gls)
1958	Belgium	1	(0)

Charles René De Vogelaere (16 November 1933 – 18 April 2017) was a Belgian footballer. He played in one match for the Belgium national football team in 1958. De Vogelaere died in Laeken on 18 April 2017, at the age of 83.
