= Paul Grumeau =

Belgian footballer

Personal information
- Date of birth: 28 June 1881
- Place of birth: Brussels, Belgium
- Date of death: 22 May 1955 (aged 73)

Senior career*
Years	Team	Apps	(Gls)
1900–1902	Skill de Bruxelles		
1902–1911	Union Saint-Gilloise		

International career
1905	Belgium	1	(0)

Managerial career
- 1922–1930: Lierse
- 1943–1948: Union Saint-Gilloise
- 1948–1950: Royal Léopold Club
- * Club domestic league appearances and goals

Paul Grumeau (28 June 1881 – 22 May 1955) was a Belgian footballer. He played in one match for the Belgium national football team in 1905. Grumeau also played for R.U. Saint-Gilloise, appearing in 125 matches and scoring 21 goals.
