= Georges Verlinde =

Belgian footballer

International career
| Years | Team | Apps | (Gls) |
| 1923 | Belgium | 1 | (0) |

Georges Verlinde was a Belgian footballer. He played in one match for the Belgium national football team in 1923.
