= Rudy Haleydt =

Belgian footballer

Personal information
- Full name: Rudolf Haleydt
- Date of birth: 15 February 1951 (age 75)
- Place of birth: Aalst, Belgium

Senior career*
Years	Team	Apps	(Gls)
1970–1974	Eendracht Aalst		
1974–1981	Waregem	208	(58)
1981–1983	Cercle Brugge	44	(5)
1983–1984	Eendracht Aalst		
1987–1988	Willebroek-Meerhof		

International career
1976	Belgium	1	(0)
- * Club domestic league appearances and goals

Rudolf "Rudy" Haleydt (born 15 February 1951) is a retired Belgian midfielder and former coach. Born in Aalst, Belgium, he would start his career at Eendracht Aalst before moving on to Waregem where he would spend seven years and form a prolific partnership with Dutch forward Aad Koudijzer. He would later go on to play Cercle Brugge for two years, before returning to his boyhood club Eendracht Aalst before retiring in 1984. He would later come out of retirement in 1987 to spend one season as a player manager for Willebroek-Meerhof before finally retiring from the sport in 1988. Haleydt made one appearance for Belgium in 1976 against Iceland.

== Club career ==
=== Eendracht Aalst ===
Rudy Haleydt made his debut with the first team of Eendracht Aalst in 1969. At the time the club was in the Division 3.

=== KSV Waregem ===
After 5 seasons with Eendracht Aalst, he was bought by Division 1 team, KSV Waregem, where he became a starter in the midfield the next year, forming a formidable duo with Dutch forward Aad Koudijzer, scoring at least 6 goals per season between 1975 and 1979. His good form won him a call-up to the Belgian national team in September 1976. In 1979, the club hired Dutch coach Hans Croon and Haleydt lost his starting berth.

=== Cercle Brugge ===
In 1981, after 7 seasons at Waregem, he left for Cercle Brugge. He became a key figure a key player and took part in all of the club's league matches and three cup matches. The next season, he suffered a serious injury and did not play much.

=== Return to Eendracht Aalst ===
After two seasons with Cercle Brugge, he returned to his debut team, Eendracht Aalst, where he played in the Division 2, before retiring in 1984.

== National Team Career ==
Rudy Haleydt made his first and only national team call-up for Belgium, on 5 September 1976, after a display of fine form on club level with KSV Waregem, he made his international debut in a 1978 FIFA World Cup qualification match against Iceland, coming on and playing the final 30 minutes of a 1-0 away win in Reykjavík.

== Coaching career ==
=== KSV Willebroek-Meerhof ===
After retiring, he became coach of newly promoted fr:KSV Willebroek-Meerhof, where he occasionally played himself.

=== Eendracht Zele ===
After two years at KSV Willebroek, he was appointed the manage or Division 3 team Eendracht Zele, where he also stayed for two years.

=== Return to KSV Willebroek ===
Haleydt returned to Willebroek in 1992, where he was at the helm for 21 games in total, until the end of the season in 1993.

=== US Tournai ===
In 1993, newly promoted club RFC Tournai, appointed him as their manager. He spent 3 years at the club, before departing the club in 1996.

=== RAEC Mons 1910 ===
That same year, 1996, he was hired the head coach of Division 3 team, RAEC Mons, but was fired after 17 games.

=== RC Lebbeke ===
He then made a brief spell with RC Lebbeke in the 1998-99 season, but was not able to save the club from relegation.

=== Last spells with KSV Willebroek ===
==== 2005-06 Season ====
After six years away from coaching, he made his return to coaching and third return to KSV Willebroek for the 2005-06 season.

==== 2009-10 Season ====
Haleydt would then go another 3 years, away from coaching, before returning again for the 2009-10 season as the head coach of KSV Willebroek, his fourth and final spell with the club. After which, he finally retired from coaching.
