= François Langers =

Luxembourgish footballer

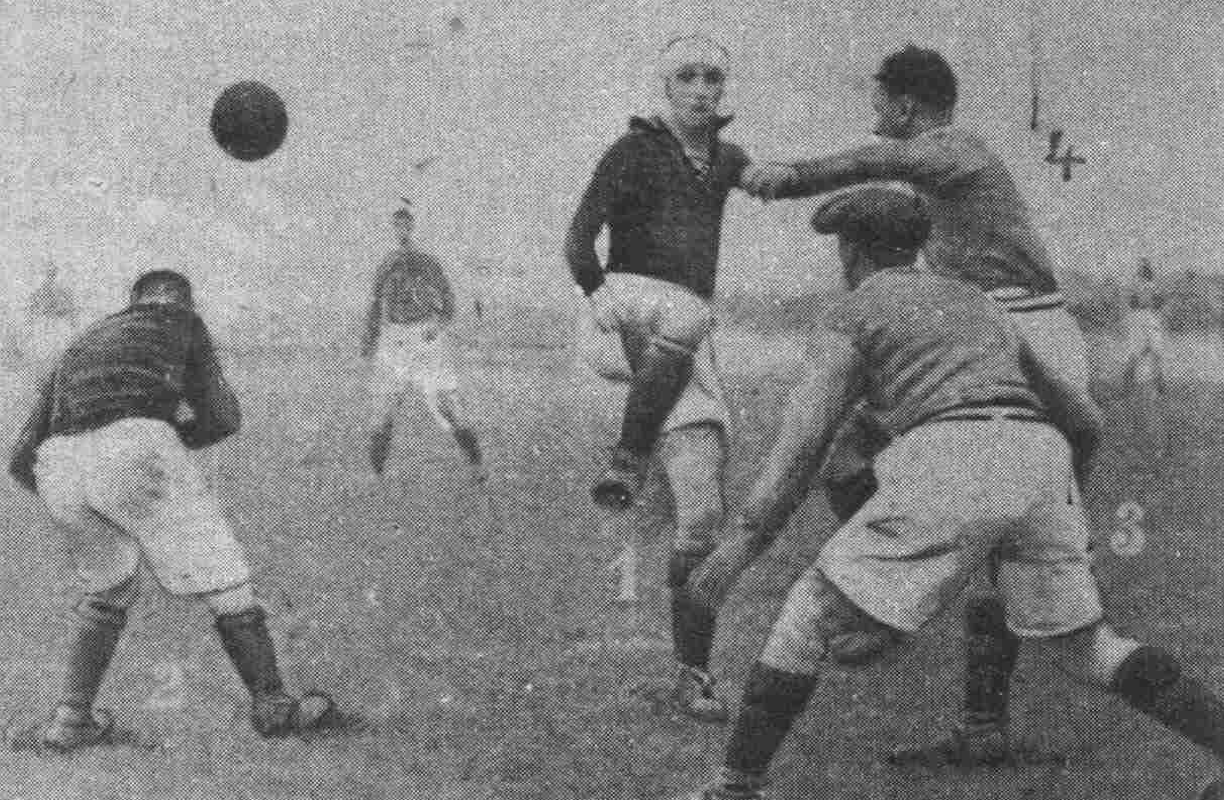
- François Langers (2) during a match between the national football teams of France (team B) and Luxembourg in 1924 in Paris.

Personal information
- Date of birth: 29 December 1896
- Place of birth: Esch-sur-Alzette, Luxembourg
- Date of death: 4 October 1929 (aged 32)
- Place of death: Esch-sur-Alzette, Luxembourg

International career
Years	Team	Apps	(Gls)
- Luxembourg

François Langers, also called Tiny Langers (29 December 1896 – 4 October 1929), was a Luxembourgish footballer. He competed at the 1920 Summer Olympics and the 1924 Summer Olympics.
