= Alfred Evers =

Belgian politician (1935–2018)

- Born: 13 May 1935; Eupen, Belgium
- Died: 19 November 2018 (aged 83); Eupen, Belgium
- Occupation: Politician

Alfred Evers (13 May 1935 – 19 November 2018) was a Belgian politician and a member of the Partei für Freiheit und Fortschritt.

== Biography ==
Evers began his political career in 1974 when he was elected to the Chamber of Deputies after an unpopular nomination from the opposition Liberal Party gave him a favorable outcome. In office, he represented the interests of minority East Germans and led to the creation of the German-speaking community. He served on the Parliament of Wallonia and was chair of the German-speaking committee from 1999 to 2004.

Evers was elected mayor of Eupen in 1977 and served until 2001 when he was eventually defeated by Elmar Keutgen. After this defeat, he withdrew from local politics.

Evers made a comeback into politics in 2012 when Karl-Heinz Klinkenberg was elected mayor of Eupen, and appointed him to the city council. However, Evers would resign a year later, citing health concerns. This would officially end his political career.

Outside of politics, Evers served as chair of the French Federation of Road Haulers, along with many other organizations in the transport and logistics sectors. He was president of a holding company for many Belgian communities, which was a large shareholder of Dexia Bank during their financial crisis.

In the field of transport, he was General Manager of the Ghemar Transport Company and President of the FEBETRA (Belgian Royal Federation of Carriers and Logistics Service Providers).
