= Remy Vandeweyer =

Belgian footballer

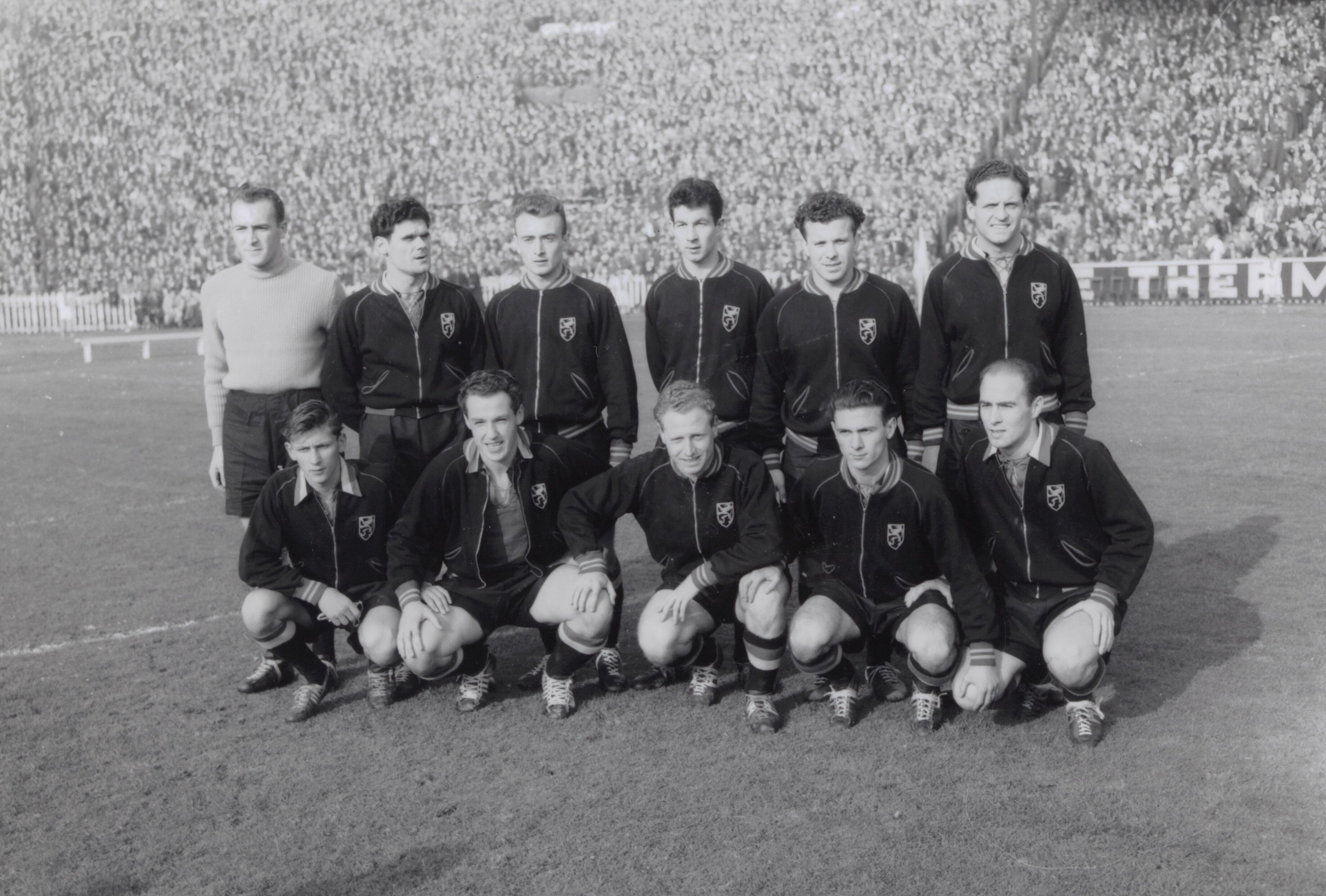
- Vandeweyer with the Belgian team (1956)

Personal information
- Date of birth: 27 July 1928
- Date of death: 30 March 1967 (aged 38)

International career
Years	Team	Apps	(Gls)
1956	Belgium	2	(1)

Remy Vandeweyer (27 July 1928 – 30 March 1967) was a Belgian footballer. He played in two matches for the Belgium national football team in 1956.
