= Camille Nys =

Belgian footballer

Personal information
- Date of birth: 9 May 1888

International career
Years	Team	Apps	(Gls)
1911–1912	Belgium	4	(0)

Camille Nys (born 9 May 1888, date of death unknown) was a Belgian footballer. He played in four matches for the Belgium national football team from 1911 to 1912.
