= Frank Mariman =

Belgian footballer

Personal information
- Date of birth: 1 May 1958 (age 68)

International career
Years	Team	Apps	(Gls)
1981	Belgium	1	(0)

Frank Mariman (born 1 May 1958) is a Belgian footballer. He played in one match for the Belgium national football team in 1981.
