= Georges Mordant =

Belgian footballer

Personal information
- Date of birth: 11 September 1927
- Date of death: 4 January 1992 (aged 64)

International career
Years	Team	Apps	(Gls)
1950	Belgium	4	(1)

Georges Mordant (11 September 1927 – 4 January 1992) was a Belgian footballer. He played in four matches for the Belgium national football team in 1950.
