= Georges Pootmans (footballer) =

Belgian footballer

Personal information
- Date of birth: 15 May 1889
- Place of birth: Antwerp, Belgium
- Position: Midfielder

Senior career*
| Years | Team | Apps | (Gls) |
- Beerschot

International career
| 1909 | Belgium | 4 | (0) |
- * Club domestic league appearances and goals

Georges Pootmans (born 15 May 1889, date of death unknown) was a Belgian footballer. He played in four matches for the Belgium national football team in 1909.
