= Sébastien Jacquemyns =

Belgian footballer (1929–1976)

Personal information
- Date of birth: 25 June 1929
- Place of birth: Uccle, Belgium
- Date of death: 21 May 1976 (aged 46)
- Position: Defender

Senior career*
Years	Team	Apps	(Gls)
1952–1954	Standard Liège	23	(5)
1954–1958	Union Saint-Gilloise		

International career
1955	Belgium	2	(0)
- * Club domestic league appearances and goals

Sébastien Jacquemyns (25 June 1929 – 21 May 1976) was a Belgian footballer who played as a defender for Standard Liège and Union Saint-Gilloise. He made two appearances for the Belgium in 1955.
