= Maurice Petit =

Belgian footballer

Personal information
- Date of birth: 30 October 1888

International career
Years	Team	Apps	(Gls)
1910	Belgium	1	(0)

Maurice Petit (born 30 October 1888, date of death unknown) was a Belgian footballer. He played in one match for the Belgium national football team in 1910.
