= Jacques Secretin (footballer) =

Belgian footballer

Personal information
- Full name: Jacques Jules Louis Sécretin
- Date of birth: 28 December 1907
- Place of birth: Hollogne-aux-Pierres, Belgium
- Date of death: 29 December 1978 (aged 71)
- Position: Forward

Senior career*
Years	Team	Apps	(Gls)
1927–1934	R.R.F.C. Montegnée		
1934–1939	Charleroi		

International career
1930–1931	Belgium	3	(1)
- * Club domestic league appearances and goals

Jacques Jules Louis Sécretin (28 December 1907 – 29 December 1978) was a Belgian footballer who played as a forward for R.R.F.C. Montegnée and Charleroi. He made three appearances for the Belgium national team from 1930 to 1931.
