= Maurice Lefebvre (footballer) =

Belgian footballer

Personal information
- Date of birth: 23 July 1888
- Date of death: 6 April 1965 (aged 76)

International career
Years	Team	Apps	(Gls)
1909	Belgium	1	(0)

Maurice Lefebvre (23 July 1888 – 6 April 1965) was a Belgian footballer. He played in one match for the Belgium national football team in 1909.
