= Louis Verbruggen =

Belgian footballer

Personal information
- Date of birth: 20 July 1928
- Date of death: 15 February 2002 (aged 73)

International career
Years	Team	Apps	(Gls)
1949–1951	Belgium	3	(3)

Louis Verbruggen (20 July 1928 – 15 February 2002) was a Belgian footballer. He played in three matches for the Belgium national football team from 1949 to 1951.
