= Yvo Van Herp =

Belgian footballer

Personal information
- Date of birth: 4 December 1949 (age 76)

International career
Years	Team	Apps	(Gls)
1973–1974	Belgium	3	(1)

Yvo Van Herp (born 4 December 1949) is a Belgian footballer. He played in three matches for the Belgium national football team from 1973 to 1974.
