= Pierre Vergeylen =

Belgian footballer

Personal information
- Date of birth: 3 November 1891

International career
Years	Team	Apps	(Gls)
1912	Belgium	1	(0)

Pierre Vergeylen (born 3 November 1891, date of death unknown) was a Belgian footballer. He played in one match for the Belgium national football team in 1912.
