= Albert Michiels (footballer) =

Belgian footballer

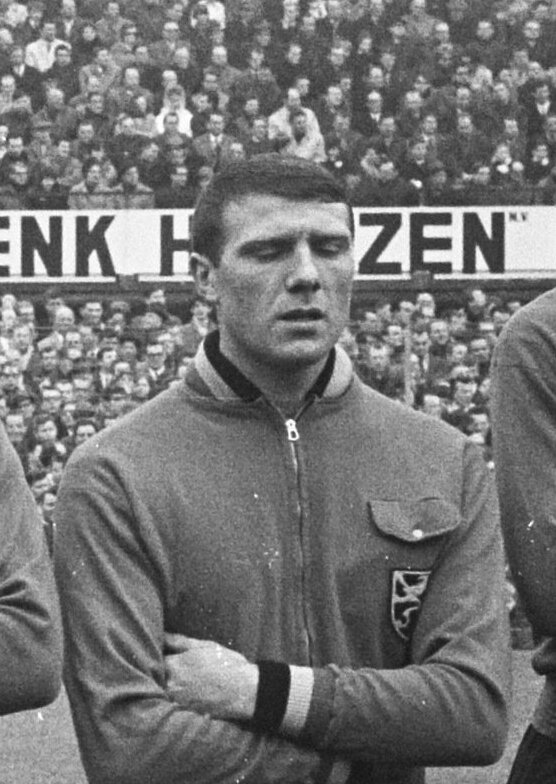
- Michiels (1966)

Personal information
- Date of birth: 14 March 1939 (age 87)

International career
Years	Team	Apps	(Gls)
1965–1966	Belgium	4	(0)

Albert Michiels (born 14 March 1939) is a Belgian footballer. He played in four matches for the Belgium national football team from 1965 to 1966.
