= Pierre Verhoeven =

Belgian footballer

Personal information
- Date of birth: 26 March 1896

International career
| Years | Team | Apps | (Gls) |
| 1921 | Belgium | 1 | (0) |

Pierre Verhoeven (born 26 March 1896, date of death unknown) was a Belgian footballer. He played in one match for the Belgium national football team in 1921.
