= Louis Verboven =

Belgian footballer (1909–1967)

Personal information
- Date of birth: 21 February 1909
- Date of death: 14 March 1967 (aged 58)

International career
Years	Team	Apps	(Gls)
1931–1933	Belgium	2	(0)

Louis Verboven (21 February 1909 – 14 March 1967) was a Belgian footballer. He played in two matches for the Belgium national football team from 1931 to 1933.
