= Félix Van Campenhout =

Belgian footballer

Personal information
- Date of birth: 7 December 1910

International career
Years	Team	Apps	(Gls)
1931	Belgium	2	(0)

Félix Van Campenhout (born 7 December 1910, date of death unknown) was a Belgian footballer. He played in two matches for the Belgium national football team in 1931.
