= 1975–76 Liverpool F.C. season =

English football club season

Liverpool F.C.
1975–76 season
- Chairman: John W Smith
- Manager: Bob Paisley
- First Division: Champions
- UEFA Cup: Winners
- FA Cup: Fourth round
- League Cup: Third round
- Top goalscorer: League: John Toshack (16); All: John Toshack (23)
- Average home league attendance: 41,670
Home colours	Away colours

The 1975–76 season was Liverpool Football Club's 84th season in existence and their 14th consecutive season in the First Division. Liverpool won its ninth Football League title and second UEFA Cup, which were the first trophies won under manager Bob Paisley, in his second season as manager.

Paisley saw his team clinch the league title narrowly ahead of contenders Queens Park Rangers. In a climax to the season, Liverpool needed to either win or secure a low-scoring draw against relegation-threatened Wolverhampton Wanderers. With 14 minutes left for play and despite constant pressure in the second half, the Reds trailed to a Steve Kindon strike for Wolves. The title was slipping away from Liverpool but three late goals from Kevin Keegan, John Toshack and Ray Kennedy in front of away support ensured Liverpool's ninth title and Bob Paisley's first trophy.

In the UEFA Cup, Liverpool overcame Barcelona in the semi-finals, to set up a final with Club Brugge. Liverpool won the first leg 3–2 on 28 April after being two-nil down in the first half. Three weeks later, a 1–1 draw in Olympiastadion, Bruges, saw them lift the cup for the second time.

The emergence of Phil Neal, Phil Thompson and Ray Kennedy in the Liverpool side saw them make their England debuts in the Welsh FA Centenary International against Wales on 24 March 1976. Also in the England side were Ray Clemence and, captaining England for the first time, Kevin Keegan, and those five would go on to play for England for many years to come.

== Squad ==
=== Goalkeepers ===
- (England) Ray Clemence
- (England) Frank Lane
- (England) Peter McDonnell

=== Defenders ===
- (England) Emlyn Hughes
- (Wales) Joey Jones
- (England) Brian Kettle
- (England) Chris Lawler
- (England) Alec Lindsay
- (England) John McLaughlin
- (England) Phil Neal
- (England) Tommy Smith
- (England) Max Thompson
- (England) Phil Thompson

=== Midfielders ===
- (England) Ian Callaghan
- (England) Jimmy Case
- (Scotland) Peter Cormack
- (Scotland) Brian Hall
- (Republic of Ireland) Steve Heighway
- (England) Ray Kennedy
- (England) Terry McDermott

=== Attackers ===
- (England) Phil Boersma
- (England) David Fairclough
- (England) Kevin Keegan
- (England) Kevin Kewley
- (Wales) John Toshack
- (England) Alan Waddle

== Squad statistics ==
=== Appearances and goals ===
No.	Pos	Nat	Player	Total		Division 1		FA Cup		League Cup		UEFA Cup	
No.	Pos	Nat	Player	Apps	Goals	Apps	Goals	Apps	Goals	Apps	Goals	Apps	Goals
	FW	(England) ENG	Phil Boersma	5	0	1+2	0	0+0	0	0+1	0	0+1	0
	MF	(England) ENG	Ian Callaghan	57	4	40+0	3	2+0	0	3+0	0	12+0	1
	MF	(England) ENG	Jimmy Case	39	12	27+0	6	2+0	0	1+0	1	7+2	5
	GK	(England) ENG	Ray Clemence	59	0	42+0	0	2+0	0	3+0	0	12+0	0
	MF	(Scotland) SCO	Peter Cormack	24	1	16+1	1	0+0	0	3+0	0	3+1	0
	FW	(England) ENG	David Fairclough	19	8	5+9	7	0+0	0	0+0	0	2+3	1
	MF	(Scotland) SCO	Brian Hall	25	2	12+1	2	0+1	0	2+0	0	6+3	0
	MF	(Republic of Ireland) IRL	Steve Heighway	54	6	39+0	4	2+0	0	2+0	0	11+0	2
	DF	(England) ENG	Emlyn Hughes	57	2	41+0	2	2+0	0	3+0	0	11+0	0
	DF	(Wales) WAL	Joey Jones	14	0	13+0	0	0+0	0	0+0	0	1+0	0
	FW	(England) ENG	Kevin Keegan	57	16	41+0	12	2+0	1	3+0	0	11+0	3
	MF	(England) ENG	Ray Kennedy	43	10	29+1	6	2+0	0	1+0	0	10+0	4
	DF	(England) ENG	Brian Kettle	2	0	1+0	0	0+0	0	0+0	0	1+0	0
	DF	(England) ENG	Chris Lawler	1	0	0+0	0	0+0	0	0+0	0	1+0	0
	DF	(England) ENG	Alec Lindsay	11	1	6+0	0	0+0	0	3+0	1	2+0	0
	MF	(England) ENG	Terry McDermott	10	1	7+2	1	0+0	0	1+0	0	0+0	0
	DF	(England) ENG	Phil Neal	59	7	42+0	6	2+0	0	3+0	0	12+0	1
	DF	(England) ENG	Tommy Smith	35	0	24+0	0	2+0	0	0+0	0	9+0	0
	DF	(England) ENG	Max Thompson	1	0	0+0	0	0+0	0	0+0	0	0+1	0
	DF	(England) ENG	Phil Thompson	57	2	41+0	0	2+0	0	3+0	0	11+0	2
	FW	(Wales) WAL	John Toshack	51	23	35+0	16	2+0	1	2+0	0	12+0	6

== League table ==
Pos	Team	Pld	W	D	L	GF	GA	GAv	Pts	Qualification or relegation
1	Liverpool (C)	42	23	14	5	66	31	2.129	60	Qualification for the European Cup first round
2	Queens Park Rangers	42	24	11	7	67	33	2.030	59	Qualification for the UEFA Cup first round
3	Manchester United	42	23	10	9	68	42	1.619	56	Qualification for the UEFA Cup first round
4	Derby County	42	21	11	10	75	58	1.293	53	Qualification for the UEFA Cup first round
5	Leeds United	42	21	9	12	65	46	1.413	51	

Source: World Football
Rules for classification: 1) Points; 2) Goal average; 3) Goals scored
(C) Champions

== Results ==
=== First Division ===
Date	Opponents	Venue	Result	Scorers	Attendance	Report 1	Report 2
16-Aug-75	Queens Park Rangers	A	0–2		27,113	Report	Report
19-Aug-75	West Ham United	H	2–2	Callaghan 24' Toshack 81'	40,564	Report	Report
23-Aug-75	Tottenham Hotspur	H	3–2	Keegan 54' (pen.) Case 68' Heighway 72'	42,729	Report	Report
26-Aug-75	Leeds United	A	3–0	Kennedy 26' Callaghan 84', 88'	36,186	Report	Report
30-Aug-75	Leicester City	A	1–1	Keegan 50'	25,008	Report	Report
06-Sep-75	Sheffield United	H	1–0	Kennedy 78'	37,340	Report	Report
13-Sep-75	Ipswich Town	A	0–2		28,132	Report	Report
20-Sep-75	Aston Villa	H	3–0	Toshack 62' Keegan 77' Case 86'	42,779	Report	Report
27-Sep-75	Everton	A	0–0		55,570	Report	Report
04-Oct-75	Wolverhampton Wanderers	H	2–0	Hall 60' Case 86'	36,391	Report	Report
11-Oct-75	Birmingham City	H	3–1	Toshack 13', 59', 86'	36,532	Report	Report
18-Oct-75	Coventry City	A	0–0		20,695	Report	Report
25-Oct-75	Derby County	H	1–1	Toshack 27'	46,324	Report	Report
01-Nov-75	Middlesbrough	A	1–0	McDermott 71'	30,952	Report	Report
08-Nov-75	Manchester United	H	3–1	Heighway 12' Toshack 46' Keegan 78'	49,136	Report	Report
15-Nov-75	Newcastle United	A	2–1	Hall 41' R. Kennedy 88'	39,686	Report	Report
22-Nov-75	Coventry City	H	1–1	Toshack 28'	36,929	Report	Report
29-Nov-75	Norwich City	H	1–3	Hughes 87'	34,780	Report	Report
02-Dec-75	Arsenal	H	2–2	Neal 23' (pen.), 59' (pen.)	27,447	Report	Report
06-Dec-75	Burnley	A	0–0		18,426	Report	Report
13-Dec-75	Tottenham Hotspur	A	4–0	Keegan 43' Case 54' Neal 74' Heighway 86'	29,891	Report	Report
20-Dec-75	Queens Park Rangers	H	2–0	Toshack 22' Neal 75' (pen.)	39,182	Report	Report
26-Dec-75	Stoke City	A	1–1	Toshack 8'	32,092	Report	Report
27-Dec-75	Manchester City	H	1–0	Cormack 61'	53,386	Report	Report
10-Jan-76	Ipswich Town	H	3–3	Keegan 13', 33' Case 78'	40,547	Report	Report
17-Jan-76	Sheffield United	A	0–0		31,255	Report	Report
31-Jan-76	West Ham United	A	4–0	Toshack 63', 75', 81' Keegan 88'	26,741	Report	Report
07-Feb-76	Leeds United	H	2–0	Keegan 40' Toshack 71'	54,525	Report	Report
18-Feb-76	Manchester United	A	0–0		59,709	Report	Report
21-Feb-76	Newcastle United	H	2–0	Keegan 26' Case 51'	43,404	Report	Report
24-Feb-76	Arsenal	A	0–1		36,127	Report	Report
28-Feb-76	Derby County	A	1–1	Kennedy 86'	32,800	Report	Report
06-Mar-76	Middlesbrough	H	0–2		41,391	Report	Report
13-Mar-76	Birmingham City	A	1–0	Neal 83' (pen.)	31,397	Report	Report
20-Mar-76	Norwich City	A	1–0	Fairclough 59'	29,013	Report	Report
27-Mar-76	Burnley	H	2–0	Fairclough 39', 61'	36,708	Report	Report
03-Apr-76	Everton	H	1–0	Fairclough 88'	54,632	Report	Report
06-Apr-76	Leicester City	H	1–0	Keegan 58'	36,290	Report	Report
10-Apr-76	Aston Villa	A	0–0		44,250	Report	Report
17-Apr-76	Stoke City	H	5–3	Neal 37' (pen.) Toshack 43' Kennedy 51' Hughes 73' Fairclough 78'	44,069	Report	Report
19-Apr-76	Manchester City	A	3–0	Heighway 73' Fairclough 88', 89'	50,439	Report	Report
04-May-76	Wolverhampton Wanderers	A	3–1	Keegan 76' Toshack 85' Kennedy 89'	48,900	Report	Report

=== Football League Cup ===
Date	Opponents	Venue	Result	Scorers	Attendance	Report 1	Report 2
10-Sep-75	York City	A	1–0	Lindsay 88' (pen.)	9.421	Report	Report
07-Oct-75	Burnley	H	1–1	Case 81'	24,607	Report	Report
14-Oct-75	Burnley	A	0–1		19,857	Report	Report

=== FA Cup ===
Date	Opponents	Venue	Result	Scorers	Attendance	Report 1	Report 2
03-Jan-76	West Ham United	A	2–0	Keegan 37' Toshack 82'	32,363	Report	Report
24-Jan-76	Derby County	A	0–1		38,200	Report	Report

=== UEFA Cup ===
Date	Opponents	Venue	Result	Scorers	Attendance	Report 1	Report 2
17-Sep-75	Hibernian	A	0–1		19,219	Report	Report
30-Sep-75	Hibernian	H	3–1	Toshack 21', 53', 64'	29,963	Report	Report
22-Oct-75	Real Sociedad	A	3–1	Heighway 20' Callaghan 61' P. Thompson 82'	16,256	Report	Report
04-Nov-75	Real Sociedad	H	6–0	Toshack 14' Kennedy 30', 75' Fairclough 72' Heighway 77' Neal 79'	23,796	Report	Report
26-Nov-75	Śląsk Wrocław	A	2–1	Kennedy 61' Toshack 75'	40,000	Report	Report
10-Dec-75	Śląsk Wrocław	H	3–0	Case 22', 30', 46'	17,886	Report	Report
03-Mar-76	Dynamo Dresden	A	0–0		32,182	Report	Report
17-Mar-76	Dynamo Dresden	H	2–1	Case 24' Keegan 47'	39,300	Report	Report
30-Mar-76	Barcelona	A	1–0	Toshack 13'	70,000	Report	Report
14-Apr-76	Barcelona	H	1–1	P. Thompson 50'	55,104	Report	Report

=== First leg ===
28 April 1976
19:30 BST

Liverpool (England)	3–2	(Belgium) Club Brugge
Kennedy 59'; Case 61'; Keegan 65' (pen.)	Report Report	Lambert 5'; Cools 15'

Anfield, Liverpool
Attendance: 50,188
Referee: Ferdinand Biwersi (Germany)

Liverpool	Club Brugge

GK	1	(England) Ray Clemence
RB	2	(England) Phil Neal
LB	3	(England) Tommy Smith
CB	4	(England) Phil Thompson
LM	5	(England) Ray Kennedy
CB	6	(England) Emlyn Hughes (c)
ST	7	(England) Kevin Keegan
ST	8	(England) David Fairclough
RM	9	(Republic of Ireland) Steve Heighway
ST	10	(Wales) John Toshack	(substituted off) 46'
CM	11	(England) Ian Callaghan
Substitutes:
MF	12	(England) Jimmy Case	(substituted on) 46'
GK	13	(England) Peter McDonnell
DF	14	(Wales) Joey Jones
MF	15	(England) Brian Hall
MF	16	(England) Terry McDermott
Manager:
(England) Bob Paisley

GK	1	(Denmark) Birger Jensen
RB	2	(Belgium) Fons Bastijns (c)
CB	3	(Austria) Eddie Krieger
CB	4	(Belgium) Georges Leekens
LB	5	(Belgium) Jos Volders
MF	6	(Belgium) Julien Cools
MF	7	(Belgium) René Vandereycken
MF	8	(Belgium) Daniël De Cubber
FW	9	(Belgium) Roger Van Gool
FW	10	(Belgium) Raoul Lambert
FW	11	(Denmark) Ulrik le Fevre
Substitutes:
GK	12	(Belgium) Hugo Pieters
RB	13	(Belgium) Norbert De Naeghel
MF	14	(Belgium) Dirk Sanders
FW	15	(Liechtenstein) Konrad Holenstein
FW	16	(Belgium) Dirk Hinderyckx
Manager:
(Austria) Ernst Happel

=== Second leg ===
19 May 1976
21:00 CEST

Club Brugge (Belgium)	1–1	(England) Liverpool
Lambert 11' (pen.)	Report Report	Keegan 15'

Olympiastadion, Bruges
Attendance: 29,423
Referee: Rudi Glöckner (East Germany)

Club Bruges	Liverpool

GK	1	(Denmark) Birger Jensen
RB	2	(Belgium) Fons Bastijns (c)
CB	3	(Austria) Eddie Krieger
CB	4	(Belgium) Georges Leekens
LB	5	(Belgium) Jos Volders
MF	6	(Belgium) Julien Cools
MF	7	(Belgium) René Vandereycken
MF	8	(Belgium) Daniël De Cubber	(substituted off) 68'
FW	9	(Belgium) Roger Van Gool
FW	10	(Belgium) Raoul Lambert	(substituted off) 75'
FW	11	(Denmark) Ulrik le Fevre
Substitutes:
GK	12	(Belgium) Hugo Pieters
RB	13	(Belgium) Norbert De Naeghel
FW	14	(Belgium) Dirk Hinderyckx	(substituted on) 68'
MF	15	(Belgium) Dirk Sanders	(substituted on) 75'
Manager:
(Austria) Ernst Happel

GK	1	(England) Ray Clemence
RB	2	(England) Phil Neal
LB	3	(England) Tommy Smith
CB	4	(England) Phil Thompson
LM	5	(England) Ray Kennedy
CB	6	(England) Emlyn Hughes (c)
ST	7	(England) Kevin Keegan
CM	8	(England) Jimmy Case
RM	9	(Republic of Ireland) Steve Heighway
ST	10	(Wales) John Toshack	(substituted off) 62'
CM	11	(England) Ian Callaghan
Substitutes:
FW	12	(England) David Fairclough	(substituted on) 62'
GK	13	(England) Peter McDonnell
DF	14	(Wales) Joey Jones
MF	15	(England) Brian Hall
MF	16	(England) Terry McDermott
Manager:
(England) Bob Paisley
