= 1977 Belgian Cup final =

- Event: 1976–77 Belgian Cup
| Anderlecht | Club Brugge |
| 3 | 4 |
- Date: 12 June 1977
- Venue: Heizel Stadium, Brussels
- Referee: François Rion
- Attendance: 53,200

The 1977 Belgian Cup final, took place on 12 June 1977 between Anderlecht and Club Brugge. It was the 22nd Belgian Cup final and the first final in which Club Brugge and Anderlecht met each other. Club Brugge won the match 4-3.

== Route to the final ==
| Club Brugge | | | | Anderlecht |
|---|---|---|---|---|---|---|
| Opponent | Result | Legs | Round | Opponent | Result | Legs |
| Stade Braine | 5–0 | 5–0 home | Round of 64 | AC Olen | 2–1 | 2–1 home |
| Gerhees Oostham | 10–1 | 10–1 home | Round of 32 | KWS Club Lauwe | 7–0 | 7–0 home |
| Lokeren | 1–0 | 1–0 home | Round of 16 | Olympic Montignies | 1–0 | 1–0 away |
| Winterslag | 3–1 | 3–1 home | Quarter-finals | Tongeren | 3–0 | 3–0 home |
| Waregem | 4–2 | 4–2 home | Semi-finals | Cercle Brugge | 3–2 | 3–2 home |

== Match ==
=== Summary ===
During the first half, Anderlecht scored from three long range shots, with Club Brugge barely managing to hang on and happy to go into the break only one goal down at 3-2. During the second half Roger Davies turned the tide as he scored twice to hand Club Brugge the cup.

=== Details ===
12 June 1977
16:00 CET

| Anderlecht | 3–4 | Club Brugge |
|---|---|---|
| Haan 3'; Van der Elst 15'; Coeck 29' | | Lambert 26'; Le Fevre 34'; Davies 61', 84' |

King Baudouin Stadium, Brussels
Attendance: 53,200
Referee: François Rion

| Anderlecht | Club Brugge |

| GK | (Netherlands) Jan Ruiter |
| RB | (Belgium) Gilbert Van Binst |
| CB | (Belgium) Hugo Broos |
| CB | (Belgium) Erwin Vandendaele |
| LB | (Belgium) Jean Thissen |
| MF | (Belgium) Jean Dockx |
| MF | (Netherlands) Arie Haan |
| MF | (Belgium) Ludo Coeck |
| MF | (Belgium) Franky Vercauteren |
| FW | (Belgium) François Van der Elst |
| FW | (Netherlands) Peter Ressel |
Manager:
(Belgium) Raymond Goethals

| GK | (Denmark) Birger Jensen |
| RB | (Belgium) Fons Bastijns |
| CB | (Belgium) Georges Leekens |
| CB | (Austria) Eduard Krieger | (substituted off) 20' |
| LB | (Belgium) Jos Volders |
| MF | (Belgium) Julien Cools |
| MF | (Belgium) René Vandereycken |
| MF | (Belgium) Dirk Sanders |
| MF | (Denmark) Ulrik le Fevre |
| FW | (Belgium) Raoul Lambert | (substituted off) 65' |
| FW | (England) Roger Davies |
Substitutes:
| CB | (Belgium) Gino Maes | (substituted on) 20' |
| FW | (Belgium) Dirk Hinderyckx | (substituted on) 65' |
Manager:
(Austria) Ernst Happel

Assistant referees:
(Belgium) Jan Peeters
(Belgium) Roger Schoeters

Match rules

- 90 minutes.
- 30 minutes of extra time if necessary.
- Penalty shoot-out if scores still level.
- Maximum of three substitutions.

== See also ==
- R.S.C. Anderlecht–Club Brugge KV rivalry
