= 1976 UEFA Cup final =

- Match program booklet for the return match
- Event: 1975–76 UEFA Cup
Liverpool	Club Brugge
(England)	(Belgium)
4	3
- on aggregate

First leg
Liverpool	Club Brugge
3	2
- Date: 28 April 1976
- Venue: Anfield, Liverpool
- Referee: Ferdinand Biwersi (West Germany)
- Attendance: 50,188

Second leg
Club Brugge	Liverpool
1	1
- Date: 19 May 1976
- Venue: Olympiastadion, Bruges
- Referee: Rudi Glöckner (East Germany)
- Attendance: 29,423

The 1976 UEFA Cup Final were association football matches played over two-legs between Liverpool of England and Club Brugge of Belgium on 28 April 1976 at Anfield, Liverpool and on 19 May 1976 at the Olympiastadion, Bruges. It was the final of the 1975–76 season of Europe's secondary cup competition, the UEFA Cup. Liverpool were appearing in their second final; they had won the competition in 1973. Brugge were appearing in their first European final and were the first Belgian team to reach the final of a European competition.

Each club needed to progress through five rounds to reach the final. Matches were contested over two legs, with one at each team's home ground. Liverpool's ties varied from comfortable victories to close affairs. They beat Spanish team Real Sociedad 9–1 on aggregate in the second round, while they beat Spanish team Barcelona 2–1 in the semi-finals. The majority of Brugge's ties were close. Their biggest margin of victory was by two goals, which occurred in both the first and third round against Lyon of France and Italian team Roma, respectively.

Watched by a crowd of 50,188 at Anfield, Brugge took a two-goal lead in the first half of the first leg when Raoul Lambert and Julien Cools scored. Liverpool recovered in the second half; three goals in seven minutes from Ray Kennedy, Jimmy Case, and Kevin Keegan secured a 3–2 victory in the first leg for Liverpool. A crowd of 29,423 at the Olympiastadion saw Brugge take the lead in the 11th minute of the second leg. Liverpool equalised four minutes later when Keegan scored. The scores remained the same throughout the remainder of the match, resulting in a 1–1 draw. Thus, Liverpool won the final 4–3 on aggregate to secure their second UEFA Cup.

== Route to the final ==
=== Liverpool ===
Round	Opposition	First leg	Second leg	Aggregate score
1st	(Scotland) Hibernian	0–1 (a)	3–1 (h)	3–2
2nd	(Spain) Real Sociedad	3–1 (a)	6–0 (h)	9–1
3rd	(Poland) Śląsk Wrocław	2–1 (a)	3–0 (h)	5–1
Quarter-final	(East Germany) Dynamo Dresden	0–0 (a)	2–1 (h)	2–1
Semi-final	(Spain) Barcelona	1–0 (a)	1–1 (h)	2–1

Liverpool qualified for the UEFA Cup by finishing as runners-up in the 1974–75 Football League First Division. Their opponents in the first round were Scottish team Hibernian. Liverpool lost the first leg at Hibernian's home stadium Easter Road 1–0, but recovered in the second leg at their home ground, Anfield, winning 3–1 courtesy of a John Toshack hat-trick. They thus won the round 3–2 on aggregate. For the second round Liverpool were drawn against Spanish team Real Sociedad; they won the first game 3–1 in Spain. A 6–0 victory in the second leg meant Liverpool won the tie 9–1 on aggregate.

Liverpool's opponents in the third round were Śląsk Wrocław of Poland. The first leg at Wrocław's home ground the Stadion Oporowska was won 2–1 by Liverpool courtesy of goals from Ray Kennedy and Toshack. A Jimmy Case hat-trick in the second leg at Anfield secured a 3–0 victory for Liverpool, which meant they progressed to the quarter-finals with a 5–1 aggregate victory. Liverpool's next opponents were East German team Dynamo Dresden. The first leg in East Germany ended in a 0–0 draw, after Liverpool goalkeeper Ray Clemence saved a penalty from Peter Kotte. A 2–1 victory in the second leg courtesy of goals from Case and Kevin Keegan meant Liverpool progressed to the semi-finals courtesy of a 2–1 aggregate victory.

Spanish team Barcelona were the opposition in the semi-finals. The first leg was held at Barcelona's home ground the Camp Nou. Liverpool won the match 1–0, after Toshack scored in the 13th minute. The second leg at Anfield saw Liverpool go ahead in the 50th minute when Phil Thompson scored. Barcelona equalised a minute later but were unable to score again before the final whistle. The match ended 1–1; Liverpool progressed to their second UEFA Cup final courtesy of their 2–1 aggregate victory.

=== Club Brugge ===
Round	Opposition	First leg	Second leg	Aggregate score
1st	(France) Lyon	3–4 (a)	3–0 (h)	6–4
2nd	(England) Ipswich Town	0–3 (a)	4–0 (h)	4–3
3rd	(Italy) Roma	1–0 (h)	1–0 (a)	2–0
Quarter-final	(Italy) A.C. Milan	2–0 (h)	1–2 (a)	3–2
Semi-final	(West Germany) Hamburger SV	1–1 (a)	1–0 (h)	2–1

Club Brugge gained entry to the UEFA Cup by finishing fourth in the 1974–75 Belgian First Division. Lyon of France were the opposition in the first round. The first leg, at Lyon's home ground Stade de Gerland, ended in a 4–3 defeat for Brugge. They won the second leg at their home stadium, the Olympiastadion, 3–0 to secure their place in the next round courtesy of a 6–4 aggregate victory.

Their opponents in the second round were English team Ipswich Town. The first leg, at Ipswich's home ground Portman Road, was won 3–0 by the English team. Brugge needed to score at least three goals to have any chance of staying in the competition. They won the second leg 4–0, to win the tie 4–3 on aggregate and progress to the third round.

Roma were the opposition in the third round. Brugge won the first leg in Belgium 1–0 courtesy of a Julien Cools goal. Another 1–0 in the second leg at Roma's home ground, the Stadio Olimpico meant Brugge progressed to the quarter-finals courtesy of a 2–0 aggregate victory. Brugge were drawn against another Italian team, A.C. Milan in the quarter-finals. They won the first leg 2–0 in Belgium thanks to goals from Ulrik le Fevre and Eduard Krieger. Brugge lost the second leg 2–1, at Milan's home ground the San Siro, but still qualified for the semi-finals as a result of a 3–2 aggregate victory.

Brugge's opposition in the semi-finals were German team Hamburger SV. The first leg, at Hamburg's home ground the Volksparkstadion, ended in a 1–1 draw. This gave the advantage to Brugge, as they had an away goal. A 1–0 victory in the second leg in Belgium secured a 2–1 aggregate victory, which meant Brugge progressed to their first European final.

== Background ==
Liverpool were appearing in their second UEFA Cup final. They had previously won the competition in 1973 when they beat Borussia Mönchengladbach 3–2. Club Brugge were appearing in their first European final and were the first Belgian team to reach the final of a European competition. The furthest they had progressed in previous European competitions was the quarter-finals of the 1970–71 European Cup Winners' Cup, where they were beaten by eventual winners Chelsea of England.

Liverpool had won the 1975–76 Football League First Division between the first and second legs of the UEFA Cup Final; a 3–1 victory over Wolverhampton Wanderers on the final day of the league season ensured they became champions. As a result of their league success, Liverpool qualified for the 1976–77 European Cup as English champions. Brugge had won the 1975–76 Belgian First Division; they won the competition by four points from second-place Anderlecht. Their success meant that they would also be competing in next season's European Cup as Belgian champions.

== First leg ==
=== Summary ===
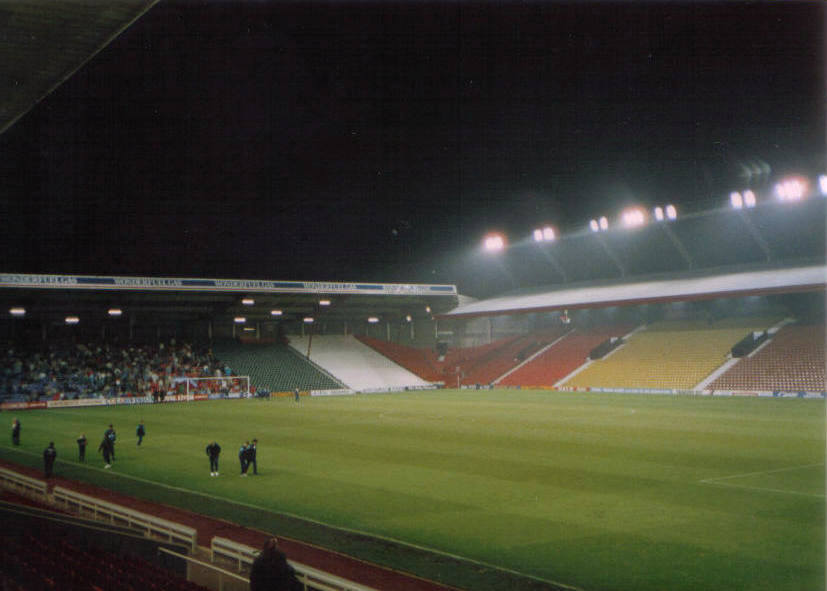
Liverpool's home ground Anfield, the venue of the first leg.

Brugge started the match the better of the two sides and took the lead in the 5th minute. A headed back-pass by Phil Neal fell short of Liverpool goalkeeper Ray Clemence allowing Brugge midfielder Raoul Lambert to take control of the ball and lob it over Clemence and into the Liverpool goal. Seven minutes later Brugge extended their lead when Julien Cools scored. The Belgians kept attacking, but the Liverpool defence of Emlyn Hughes and Tommy Smith were able to repel the Belgians until half-time.

Liverpool manager Bob Paisley decided that a change to his team had to be made during the interval. Paisley decided to replace striker John Toshack with midfielder Jimmy Case. The change made a difference as Case's runs down the right hand side of the pitch unsettled the Belgians. The full effect came in the 59th minute when Liverpool scored; Steve Heighway passed to Ray Kennedy who scored from 20 yards (18 m). Liverpool leveled the score two minutes later; a shot from Kennedy rebounded off the post to Case who scored from close range.

Three minutes later Liverpool were ahead; Heighway was upended in the penalty area, and Kevin Keegan scored the subsequent penalty to give Liverpool a 3–2 lead. Liverpool had chances to increase their lead afterwards, but failed to do so; Brugge failed to score further as well. The final score when the referee blew for full-time was 3–2.

=== Details ===
28 April 1976
19:30 BST

Liverpool (England)	3–2	(Belgium) Club Brugge
Kennedy 59'; Case 61'; Keegan 65' (pen.)	Report	Lambert 5'; Cools 15'

Anfield, Liverpool
Attendance: 50,188
Referee: Ferdinand Biwersi (West Germany)

Liverpool	Club Brugge

GK	1	(England) Ray Clemence
RB	2	(England) Tommy Smith
LB	3	(England) Phil Neal
CB	4	(England) Phil Thompson
LM	5	(England) Ray Kennedy
CB	6	(England) Emlyn Hughes (c)
CF	7	(England) Kevin Keegan
CM	8	(England) David Fairclough
RM	9	(Republic of Ireland) Steve Heighway
CF	10	(Wales) John Toshack	(substituted off) 46'
CM	11	(England) Ian Callaghan
Substitutes:
MF	12	(England) Jimmy Case	(substituted on) 46'
GK	13	(England) Peter McDonnell
DF	14	(Wales) Joey Jones
MF	15	(Scotland) Brian Hall
MF	16	(England) Terry McDermott
Manager:
(England) Bob Paisley

GK	1	(Denmark) Birger Jensen
RB	2	(Belgium) Fons Bastijns (c)
CB	3	(Austria) Eddie Krieger
CB	4	(Belgium) Georges Leekens
LB	5	(Belgium) Jos Volders
MF	6	(Belgium) Julien Cools
MF	7	(Belgium) René Vandereycken
FW	8	(Belgium) Roger Van Gool
FW	9	(Belgium) Raoul Lambert
MF	10	(Belgium) Daniël De Cubber
FW	11	(Denmark) Ulrik le Fevre
Substitutes:
GK	12	(Belgium) Hugo Pieters
RB	13	(Belgium) Norbert De Naeghel
MF	14	(Belgium) Dirk Sanders
FW	15	(Liechtenstein) Konrad Holenstein
FW	16	(Belgium) Dirk Hinderyckx
Manager:
(Austria) Ernst Happel

== Second leg ==
=== Summary ===
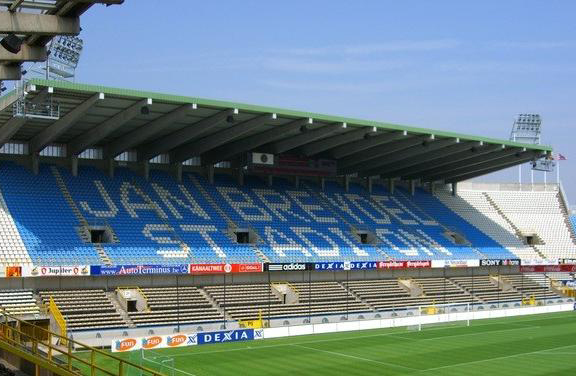
The Olympiastadion, venue of the second leg

Liverpool entered the second leg with a one-goal lead, although Brugge needed to score only one clear goal to win the competition by virtue of the away goals rule. The Belgians scored the goal they needed in the 11th minute. Liverpool defender Smith was adjudged to have handled the ball in the Liverpool penalty area and Brugge were awarded a penalty kick. Lambert converted the opportunity to give Brugge a 1–0 lead and level the aggregate tie at 3–3. Responding to the setback, Liverpool equalised four minutes later. They were awarded a free-kick outside the Brugge penalty area. Hughes rolled the ball to Keegan whose right-footed shot went into the Brugge goal to level the scores at 1–1 and give Liverpool a 4–3 aggregate lead. The goal incidentally was the first Brugge had conceded at home in the UEFA Cup all season.

Brugge needed to score again to keep the tie alive, and pushed their players forward in search of an equaliser. This forced Liverpool to pull all their players, except Keegan, into defensive positions to try to preserve their lead. Despite this Liverpool had a chance to take the lead in the 34th minute. Smith's volley from a Kennedy free-kick went wide of the Brugge goal. Brugge's pressure almost paid off five minutes into the second half. Ulrik le Fevre and Roger Van Gool combined to split the Liverpool defence, leaving Lambert with the ball. His subsequent shot beat Liverpool goalkeeper Clemence but hit the post. Brugge kept attacking in an effort to find the goal they needed; their best chance came four minutes from the end. Brugge breached the Liverpool defence, but Cools' shot was denied by a diving save from Clemence. No more goals were scored; the final score was 1–1.

The second-leg draw meant Liverpool won the tie, 4–3 on aggregate, to win their second UEFA Cup after their first victory in 1973. They also completed a League and UEFA Cup double for a second time. Liverpool manager Bob Paisley was delighted with players after their performance in the second leg: "The second half was the longest 45 minutes of my life. There was an awful lot of pride in this game because we came representing England. We did not let the country down and we are proud of our lads."

=== Details ===
19 May 1976
21:00 CEST

Club Brugge (Belgium)	1–1	(England) Liverpool
Lambert 11' (pen.)	Report	Keegan 15'

Olympiastadion, Brugge
Attendance: 29,423
Referee: Rudi Glöckner (East Germany)

Club Bruges	Liverpool

GK	1	(Denmark) Birger Jensen
RB	2	(Belgium) Fons Bastijns (c)
CB	3	(Austria) Eddie Krieger
CB	4	(Belgium) Georges Leekens
LB	5	(Belgium) Jos Volders
MF	6	(Belgium) Julien Cools
MF	7	(Belgium) René Vandereycken
FW	8	(Belgium) Roger Van Gool
FW	9	(Belgium) Raoul Lambert	(substituted off) 75'
MF	10	(Belgium) Daniël De Cubber	(substituted off) 68'
FW	11	(Denmark) Ulrik le Fevre
Substitutes:
MF	12	(Belgium) Dirk Sanders	(substituted on) 75'
RB		(Belgium) Norbert De Naeghel
FW	14	(Belgium) Dirk Hinderyckx	(substituted on) 68'
GK		(Belgium) Hugo Pieters
Manager:
(Austria) Ernst Happel

GK	1	(England) Ray Clemence
RB	2	(England) Tommy Smith
LB	3	(England) Phil Neal
CB	4	(England) Phil Thompson
LM	5	(England) Ray Kennedy
CB	6	(England) Emlyn Hughes (c)
CF	7	(England) Kevin Keegan
CM	8	(England) Jimmy Case
RM	9	(Republic of Ireland) Steve Heighway
CF	10	(Wales) John Toshack	(substituted off) 62'
CM	11	(England) Ian Callaghan
Substitutes:
FW	12	(England) David Fairclough	(substituted on) 62'
GK	13	(England) Peter McDonnell
DF	14	(Wales) Joey Jones
MF	15	(Scotland) Brian Hall
MF	16	(England) Terry McDermott
Manager:
(England) Bob Paisley

== See also ==
- 1976 European Cup final
- 1976 European Cup Winners' Cup final
- 1978 European Cup Final – contested between same teams
- Club Brugge KV in European football
- Liverpool F.C. in international football
- 1975–76 Liverpool F.C. season

== Bibliography ==
- Hale, Steve; Ponting, Ivan (1992). Liverpool In Europe. London: Guinness Publishing. ISBN 0-85112-569-7.
- Hutchings, Steve; Nawrat, Chris (1995). The Sunday Times Illustrated History of Football: The Post-War Years. London: Chancellor Press. ISBN 1-85153-014-2.
- Kelly, Stephen F. (1988). You'll Never Walk Alone. London: Queen Anne Press. ISBN 0-356-19594-5.
- Liversedge, Stan (1991). Liverpool: The Official Centenary History. London: Hamlyn Publishing Group. ISBN 0-600-57308-7.
