= RSC Anderlecht–Club Brugge KV rivalry =

Belgian football rivalry

Anderlecht–Club Brugge rivalry
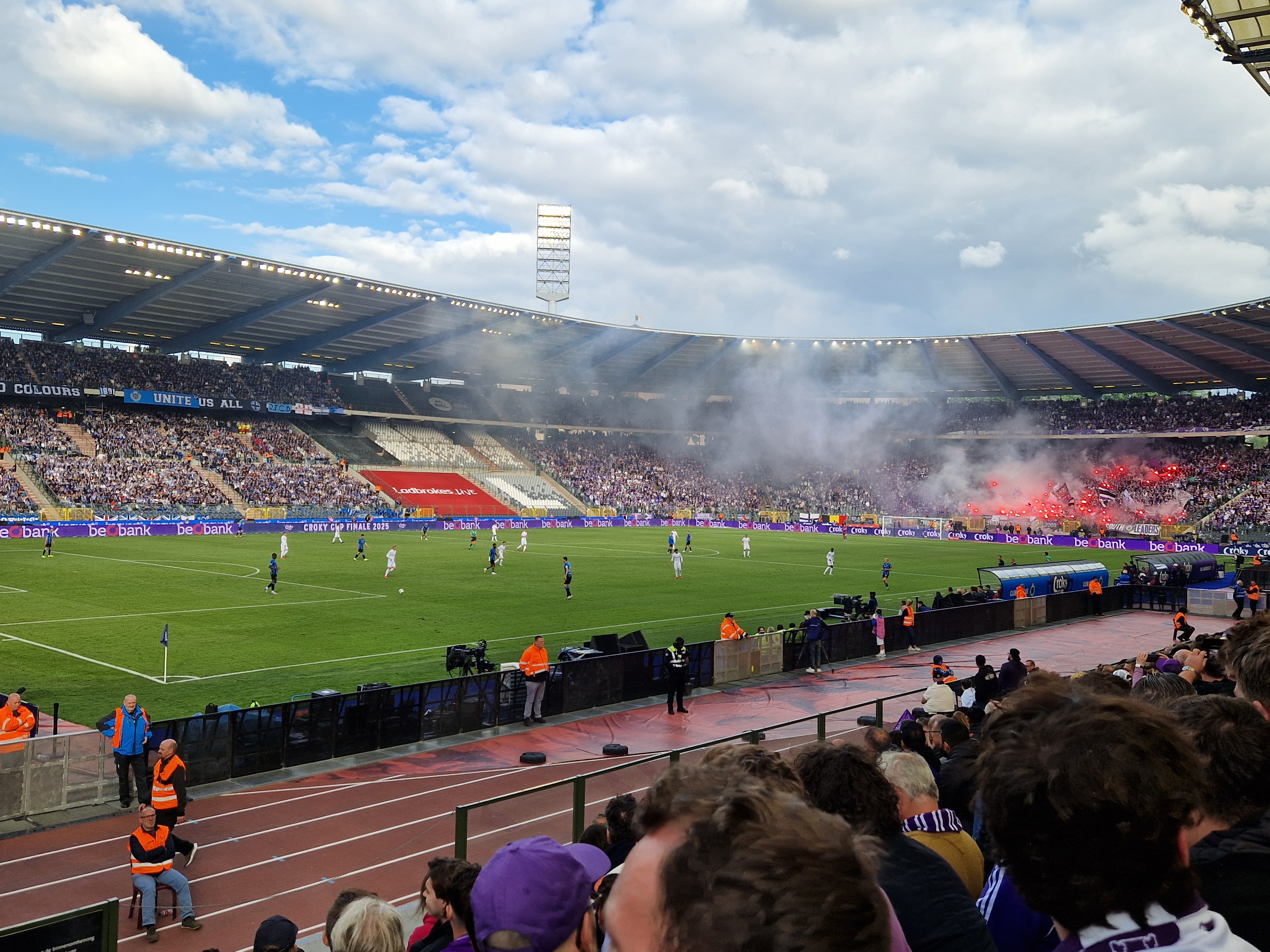
- 2025 Belgian Cup final between Anderlecht and Club Brugge in Brussels
- Other names: The Topper
- Teams: Anderlecht; Club Brugge
- First meeting: 1921; Belgian Pro League; Anderlecht 1–3 Club Brugge
- Latest meeting: 8 November 2026; Belgian Pro League; Club Brugge 1–1 Anderlecht
- Stadiums: Constant Vanden Stock Stadium (Anderlecht); Jan Breydel Stadium (Club Brugge)

Statistics
- Total meetings: 210
- Most wins: Anderlecht (73)
- All-time series: Anderlecht: 73; Drawn: 65; Club Brugge: 72
- Largest victory: Anderlecht 7–1 Club Brugge (1947)

Anderlecht vs Club Brugge is a football rivalry between two Belgian Pro League clubs Anderlecht and Club Brugge, the two most successful clubs in Belgium. The rivalry started in the early 1970s as Club Brugge emerged as a major title contender to the dominant Anderlecht. The game is called 'De Klassieker', Dutch for 'the Classic'.

The rivalry is slightly superseded by the Anderlecht vs Standard Liege rivalry which predates it despite Club Brugge being more successful than Standard in recent years. Dutch speakers tend to see Anderlecht vs. Club Brugge as the main derby while French speakers name Anderlecht vs. Standard Liège as more important.

== History ==
The two first met during the 1921–22 season. They have both been ever-present in the top flight since 1959–60.

== Honours ==
As of 21 May 2026

Team	Major domestic					International						Grand total
Team	League	Cup	League Cup	Super Cup	Total	UCL	UCWC	UEL	USC	FCWC / IC	Total	Grand total
Anderlecht	34	9	3	13	59	0	2	1	2	0	5	64
Club Brugge	20	12	—	18	50	0	—	0	0	0	0	50

== All-time results ==
=== League ===
Season	Division	Anderlecht vs Club Brugge				Club Brugge vs Anderlecht			
Season	Division	Date	Venue	Score	Attendance	Date	Venue	Score	Attendance
1921–22	First Division		Émile Versé Stadium	1–3			Albert Dyserynck Stadion	1–1	
1922–23	First Division		Émile Versé Stadium	2–2			Albert Dyserynck Stadion	5–2	
1924–25	First Division		Émile Versé Stadium	3–0			Albert Dyserynck Stadion	2–0	
1925–26	First Division		Émile Versé Stadium	2–1			Albert Dyserynck Stadion	4–0	
1928–29	First Division		Émile Versé Stadium	2–4			Albert Dyserynck Stadion	4–2	
1929–30	First Division		Émile Versé Stadium	2–2			Albert Dyserynck Stadion	1–1	
1930–31	First Division		Émile Versé Stadium	1–1			Albert Dyserynck Stadion	2–2	
1935–36	First Division		Émile Versé Stadium	2–1			Albert Dyserynck Stadion	1–1	
1936–37	First Division		Émile Versé Stadium	4–1			Albert Dyserynck Stadion	1–1	
1937–38	First Division		Émile Versé Stadium	3–1			Albert Dyserynck Stadion	2–0	
1938–39	First Division		Émile Versé Stadium	2–2			Albert Dyserynck Stadion	1–3	
1946–47	First Division		Émile Versé Stadium	7–1			Albert Dyserynck Stadion	1–2	
1949–50	First Division		Émile Versé Stadium	2–1			Albert Dyserynck Stadion	0-1	
1950–51	First Division		Émile Versé Stadium	3–0			Albert Dyserynck Stadion	1–1	
1959–60	First Division		Émile Versé Stadium	5–2			Albert Dyserynck Stadion	1–0	
1960–61	First Division		Émile Versé Stadium	0–0			Albert Dyserynck Stadion	3–2	
1961–62	First Division		Émile Versé Stadium	2–0			Albert Dyserynck Stadion	1–1	
1962–63	First Division		Émile Versé Stadium	3–1			Albert Dyserynck Stadion	0–0	
1963–64	First Division		Émile Versé Stadium	3–0			Albert Dyserynck Stadion	0–5	
1964–65	First Division		Émile Versé Stadium	3–1			Albert Dyserynck Stadion	0–0	
1965–66	First Division		Émile Versé Stadium	3–1			Albert Dyserynck Stadion	0–1	
1966–67	First Division		Émile Versé Stadium	3–0			Albert Dyserynck Stadion	1–2	
1967–68	First Division		Émile Versé Stadium	1–1			Albert Dyserynck Stadion	2–2	
1968–69	First Division		Émile Versé Stadium	1–1			Albert Dyserynck Stadion	2–2	
1969–70	First Division		Émile Versé Stadium	1–3			Albert Dyserynck Stadion	1–0	
1970–71	First Division		Émile Versé Stadium	1–3			Albert Dyserynck Stadion	4–0	
1971–72	First Division		Émile Versé Stadium	1–1			Albert Dyserynck Stadion	0–2	
1972–73	First Division		Émile Versé Stadium	1–1			Albert Dyserynck Stadion	2–0	
1973–74	First Division		Émile Versé Stadium	2–0			Albert Dyserynck Stadion	2–1	
1974–75	First Division		Émile Versé Stadium	1–0			Olympiastadion	3–1	
1975–76	First Division		Émile Versé Stadium	1–0			Olympiastadion	3–2	
1976–77	First Division		Émile Versé Stadium	2–1			Olympiastadion	2–0	
1977–77	First Division		Émile Versé Stadium	6–1			Olympiastadion	2–0	
1978–79	First Division		Émile Versé Stadium	3–0			Olympiastadion	3–0	
1979–80	First Division		Émile Versé Stadium	0–1			Olympiastadion	3–0	
1980–81	First Division		Émile Versé Stadium	1–0			Olympiastadion	1–5	
1981–82	First Division		Émile Versé Stadium	2–1			Olympiastadion	0–0	
1982–83	First Division		Émile Versé Stadium	5–2			Olympiastadion	1–1	
1983–84	First Division		Constant Vanden Stock Stadium	6–1			Olympiastadion	1–1	
1984–85	First Division		Constant Vanden Stock Stadium	1–1			Olympiastadion	0–0	
1985–86	First Division		Constant Vanden Stock Stadium	0–0			Olympiastadion	3–3	
1985–86	Championship playoff	30 April 1986	Constant Vanden Stock Stadium	1–1	27,000	6 May 1986	Olympiastadion	2–2	29,000
1986–87	First Division		Constant Vanden Stock Stadium	1–0			Olympiastadion	2–1	
1987–88	First Division		Constant Vanden Stock Stadium	1–1			Olympiastadion	2–2	
1988–89	First Division		Constant Vanden Stock Stadium	1–0			Olympiastadion	1–1	
1989–90	First Division		Constant Vanden Stock Stadium	0–0			Olympiastadion	3–0	
1990–91	First Division		Constant Vanden Stock Stadium	5–1			Jan Breydel Stadium	0–2	
1991–92	First Division		Constant Vanden Stock Stadium	1–1			Jan Breydel Stadium	2–0	
1992–93	First Division		Constant Vanden Stock Stadium	1–0			Jan Breydel Stadium	0–0	
1993–94	First Division		Constant Vanden Stock Stadium	0–3			Jan Breydel Stadium	0–0	
1994–95	First Division		Constant Vanden Stock Stadium	1–0			Jan Breydel Stadium	1–0	
1995–96	First Division	28 August 1995	Constant Vanden Stock Stadium	2–1		10 February 1996	Jan Breydel Stadium	2–1	
1996–97	First Division	18 May 1997	Constant Vanden Stock Stadium	0–1		9 November 1996	Jan Breydel Stadium	2–1	
1997–98	First Division	25 May 1998	Constant Vanden Stock Stadium	0–1		29 November 1997	Jan Breydel Stadium	2–1	
1998–99	First Division	8 September 1998	Constant Vanden Stock Stadium	2–3		28 January 1999	Jan Breydel Stadium	2–0	
1999–2000	First Division		Constant Vanden Stock Stadium	1–1			Jan Breydel Stadium	0–2	
2000–01	First Division	30 November 2000	Constant Vanden Stock Stadium	2–0		4 May 2001	Jan Breydel Stadium	0–1	
2001–02	First Division	20 December 2001	Constant Vanden Stock Stadium	1–0		16 February 2002	Jan Breydel Stadium	1–0	
2002–03	First Division	22 March 2003	Constant Vanden Stock Stadium	5–1		6 December 2002	Jan Breydel Stadium	2–1	
2003–04	First Division	10 October 2003	Constant Vanden Stock Stadium	1–1		6 March 2004	Jan Breydel Stadium	1–0	
2004–05	First Division	10 December 2004	Constant Vanden Stock Stadium	2–1		14 April 2005	Jan Breydel Stadium	2–2	
2005–06	First Division	22 October 2005	Constant Vanden Stock Stadium	2–2		25 March 2006	Jan Breydel Stadium	0–2	
2006–07	First Division	26 August 2006	Constant Vanden Stock Stadium	1–0		11 February 2007	Jan Breydel Stadium	2–2	
2007–08	First Division	3 May 2008	Constant Vanden Stock Stadium	2–0		16 December 2007	Jan Breydel Stadium	1–0	
2008–09	First Division	12 April 2009	Constant Vanden Stock Stadium	1–0		16 November 2008	Jan Breydel Stadium	1–1	
2009–10	Pro League	3 February 2010	Constant Vanden Stock Stadium	3–2	23,800	4 October 2009	Jan Breydel Stadium	4–2	28,151
2009–10	PL Championship playoffs	3 April 2010	Constant Vanden Stock Stadium	2–2	23,279	18 April 2010	Jan Breydel Stadium	1–2	25,686
2010–11	Pro League	7 November 2010	Constant Vanden Stock Stadium	2–2	23,750	19 December 2010	Jan Breydel Stadium	0–2	27,424
2010–11	PL Championship playoffs	1 May 2011	Constant Vanden Stock Stadium	0–0	22,000	10 April 2011	Jan Breydel Stadium	3–0	22,208
2011–12	Pro League	15 November 2011	Constant Vanden Stock Stadium	3–0	23,335	28 August 2011	Jan Breydel Stadium	1–1	28,100
2011–12	PL Championship playoffs	6 May 2012	Constant Vanden Stock Stadium	1–1	21,000	22 April 2012	Jan Breydel Stadium	0–1	28,209
2012–13	Pro League	11 November 2012	Constant Vanden Stock Stadium	6–1	21,000	24 February 2013	Jan Breydel Stadium	2–2	27,024
2012–13	PL Championship playoffs	14 April 2014	Constant Vanden Stock Stadium	1–1	24,000	28 April 2014	Jan Breydel Stadium	2–1	26,052
2013–14	Pro League	26 January 2014	Constant Vanden Stock Stadium	2–0	19,873	22 September 2013	Jan Breydel Stadium	4–0	27,024
2013–14	PL Championship playoffs	6 April 2014	Constant Vanden Stock Stadium	3–0	19,000	4 May 2014	Jan Breydel Stadium	0–1	26,000
2014–15	Pro League	30 November 2014	Constant Vanden Stock Stadium	2–2	21,500	31 August 2014	Jan Breydel Stadium	2–2	29,042
2014–15	PL Championship playoffs	10 May 2015	Constant Vanden Stock Stadium	3–1	21,000	19 May 2015	Jan Breydel Stadium	2–1	29,000
2015–16	Pro League	25 October 2015	Constant Vanden Stock Stadium	3–1	21,000	20 December 2015	Jan Breydel Stadium	1–4	27,065
2015–16	PL Championship playoffs	17 April 2016	Constant Vanden Stock Stadium	1–0	21,000	15 May 2016	Jan Breydel Stadium	4–0	29,000
2016–17	First Division A	11 December 2016	Constant Vanden Stock Stadium	0–0	20,000	23 October 2016	Jan Breydel Stadium	2–1	27,106
2016–17	FDA Championship playoffs	23 April 2017	Constant Vanden Stock Stadium	2–0	20,366	14 May 2017	Jan Breydel Stadium	1–1	27,490
2017–18	First Division A	5 November 2017	Constant Vanden Stock Stadium	0–0	20,500	17 December 2017	Jan Breydel Stadium	5–0	27,667
2017–18	FDA Championship playoffs	15 April 2018	Constant Vanden Stock Stadium	1–0	20,391	6 May 2018	Jan Breydel Stadium	1–2	27,671
2018–19	First Division A	24 February 2019	Constant Vanden Stock Stadium	2–2	21,000	26 August 2018	Jan Breydel Stadium	2–1	27,500
2018–19	FDA Championship playoffs	4 April 2019	Constant Vanden Stock Stadium	2–3	20,000	28 April 2019	Jan Breydel Stadium	1–0	24,925
2019–20	First Division A	19 January 2020	Lotto Park	1–2	20,000	14 September 2019	Jan Breydel Stadium	2–1	26,500
2020–21	First Division A	11 April 2021	Lotto Park	2–1	0	4 October 2020	Jan Breydel Stadium	3–0	0
2020–21	FDA Championship playoffs	20 May 2021	Lotto Park	3–3	0	2 May 2021	Jan Breydel Stadium	2–2	0
2021–22	First Division A	3 October 2021	Lotto Park	1–1	19,500	19 December 2021	Jan Breydel Stadium	2–2	28,000
2021–22	FDA Championship playoffs	1 May 2022	Lotto Park	0–0	20,000	22 May 2022	Jan Breydel Stadium	1–1	28,000
2022–23	First Division A	16 October 2022	Lotto Park	0–1	21,000	15 January 2023	Jan Breydel Stadium	1–1	25,378
2023–24	First Division A	25 September 2023	Lotto Park	1–1	21,000	25 February 2024	Jan Breydel Stadium	1–2	26,056
2023–24	FDA Championship playoffs	19 May 2024	Lotto Park	0–1	22,500	7 April 2024	Jan Breydel Stadium	3–1	24,166
2024–25	Pro League	12 January 2025	Lotto Park	0–3	18,502	27 October 2024	Jan Breydel Stadium	2–1	25,978
2024–25	PL Championship playoffs	18 May 2025	Lotto Park	1–3	21,000	30 March 2025	Jan Breydel Stadium	2–0	29,000
2025–26	Pro League	9 November 2025	Lotto Park	1–0	18,681	8 March 2026	Jan Breydel Stadium	2–2	26,103
2025–26	PL Championship playoffs	3 May 2026	Lotto Park	1–3	17,573	6 April 2026	Jan Breydel Stadium	4–2	29,000

=== Cup ===
Season	Competition	Round	Date	Stadium	Home team	Score	Away team	Attendance
1967–68	Belgian Cup	Round of 16			Club Brugge	1–0	Anderlecht	
1975–76	Belgian Cup	Semi-final			Anderlecht	4–1	Club Brugge	
1976–77	Belgian Cup	Final			Club Brugge	4–3	Anderlecht	
1985–86	Belgian Super Cup	Super Cup		Constant Vanden Stock Stadium	Anderlecht	0–1	Club Brugge	
1987–88	Belgian Super Cup	Super Cup			Club Brugge	1–0	Anderlecht	
1990–91	Belgian Cup	Round of 16		Olympiastadion	Club Brugge	2–0	Anderlecht	
1990–91	Belgian Super Cup	Super Cup		Constant Vanden Stock Stadium	Anderlecht	3–3 (5–6 p)	Club Brugge	
1993–94	Belgian Cup	Final	22 May 1994	Stade Maurice Dufrasne	Anderlecht	2–0	Club Brugge	17,650
1993–94	Belgian Super Cup	Super Cup		Constant Vanden Stock Stadium	Anderlecht	1–3	Club Brugge	
1994–95	Belgian Super Cup	Super Cup		Constant Vanden Stock Stadium	Anderlecht	1–0	Club Brugge	
2004–05	Belgian Super Cup	Super Cup			Anderlecht	0–2	Club Brugge	
2007–08	Belgian Super Cup	Super Cup	28 July 2007		Anderlecht	3–1	Club Brugge	
2014–15	Belgian Cup	Final	22 March 2015	King Baudouin Stadium	Club Brugge	2–1	Anderlecht	45,000
2019–20	Belgian Cup	Quarter-final	19 December 2019	Lotto Park	Anderlecht	0–2	Club Brugge	20,000
2024–25	Belgian Cup	Final	4 May 2025	King Baudouin Stadium	Club Brugge	2–1	Anderlecht	40,861
