= 1978 European Cup final =

- Match programme cover
- Event: 1977–78 European Cup
Club Brugge	Liverpool
(Belgium)	(England)
0	1
- Date: 10 May 1978
- Venue: Wembley Stadium, London
- Referee: Charles Corver (Netherlands)
- Attendance: 92,500

The 1978 European Cup final was an association football match between Club Brugge of Belgium and Liverpool of England on 10 May 1978 at Wembley Stadium, London, England (the venue was decided in Bern by the UEFA Executive Committee on 20 September 1977). It was the final match of the 1977–78 season of Europe's premier cup competition, the European Cup. Liverpool were the reigning champions and were appearing in their second European Cup final. Club Brugge were appearing in their first European Cup final. The two sides had met once before in European competition, when they contested the 1976 UEFA Cup Final, which Liverpool won 4–3 on aggregate.

As reigning champions, Liverpool received a bye in the first round, which meant that Club Brugge played two matches more to reach the final. All but one of Liverpool's matches were comfortable victories and they won each round with an aggregate score at least two goals to the good. In the first round Club Brugge beat Finnish champions Kuopion Palloseura by 9–2 on aggregate, but they won each of their subsequent rounds by just one goal.

Watched by a crowd of 92,500, the first half was goalless. Liverpool took the lead in the second half when Kenny Dalglish scored from a Graeme Souness pass. They held this lead to win the match 1–0, securing Liverpool's second European Cup and third European trophy in succession, and they became the first English team to retain the European Cup.

== Route to the final ==
=== Club Brugge ===
Round	Opponents	First leg	Second leg	Aggregate score
1st	KuPS	4–0 (a)	5–2 (h)	9–2
2nd	Panathinaikos	2–0 (h)	0–1 (a)	2–1
Quarter-final	Atlético Madrid	2–0 (h)	2–3 (a)	4–3
Semi-final	Juventus	0–1 (a)	2–0 (h)	2–1

Club Brugge gained entry to the competition by winning the 1976–77 Belgian First Division and thus becoming Belgian champions. Their opponents in the first round were the Finnish champions, Kuopion Palloseura (KuPS). Brugge won the first leg 4–0 at KuPS's home ground, the Kuopion keskuskenttä, and the second leg 5–2 at Brugge's ground, the Jan Breydel Stadium, thus winning the round 9–2 on aggregate.

Their opponents in the second round were Greek champions Panathinaikos. The first leg was in Belgium. Brugge won 2–0 after Roger Davies scored from a penalty in the 24th minute and Julien Cools scored midway through the second half. The second leg was played at Panathinaikos' home ground, the Leoforos Alexandras Stadium. Panathinaikos won the match 1–0, so Brugge won the round with an aggregate score of 2–1.

Brugge's opponents in the quarter-finals were Spanish champions Atlético Madrid. The first leg in Belgium was won 2–0 by Brugge. The second leg, played at the Vicente Calderón Stadium, Atlético's home ground, was a close match: Atlético scored twice in the first half; Cools scored for Brugge in the 60th minute; Marcial Pina scored for Atlético two minutes later; finally Raoul Lambert scored once more for Brugge. Thus Brugge lost the match 3–2 but won the round with a 4–3 aggregate score.

Italian champions Juventus were their next opponents, in the semi-finals. The first leg, at the Stadio Olimpico di Torino, Juventus' home ground, was goalless until the 86th minute, when Roberto Bettega scored to give Juventus a 1–0 victory. The second leg in Belgium was a similarly close affair. Brugge scored in the third minute, but that left a 1–1 aggregate score after 90 minutes, requiring extra time to be played. Had the aggregate score still been tied after the extra time, there would have been a penalty shootout. However, it didn't happen, as René Vandereycken scored in the 116th minute to give Brugge a 2–0 win in the match and a 2–1 win on aggregate, granting them progress to their first European Cup final.

=== Liverpool ===
Round	Opponents	First leg	Second leg	Aggregate score
1st	Bye	—	—	—
2nd	Dynamo Dresden	5–1 (h)	1–2 (a)	6–3
Quarter-final	Benfica	2–1 (a)	4–1 (h)	6–2
Semi-final	Borussia Mönchengladbach	1–2 (a)	3–0 (h)	4–2

Liverpool were the reigning European Cup champions after defeating Borussia Mönchengladbach 3–1 to win the 1977 European Cup final. Liverpool were also the reigning English champions, having won the English league during the 1976–77 season. As reigning European Cup champions, they received a bye in the first round. They were drawn against East German champions Dynamo Dresden in the second round. Liverpool were expected to win the first leg, played at Anfield, their home ground, and they did so with a score of 5–1. Dresden won the second leg 2–1 at their home ground, Glücksgas Stadium, giving Liverpool a 6–3 win on aggregate.

In the quarter-finals, Liverpool were drawn against Portuguese champions Benfica. The first leg was played at the Estádio da Luz, Benfica's home ground. Nené scored for Benfica in the 18th minute, Jimmy Case equalised for Liverpool in the 37th minute, and Emlyn Hughes scored midway through the second half to give Liverpool a 2–1 victory. The second leg at Anfield was won 4–1 by Liverpool, giving them a 6–2 win on aggregate.

Liverpool's opponents in the semi-finals were Borussia Mönchengladbach, the team they had beaten to win the European Cup the previous year. The first leg was played in Germany at the Bökelbergstadion, which was Borussia's home ground at that time. Borussia took an early lead when Wilfried Hannes scored. Liverpool equalised in the 88th minute, when David Johnson scored, but in the following minute Rainer Bonhof scored from a 22-yard free-kick, so Borussia won 2–1. In the second leg, at Anfield, Ray Kennedy scored for Liverpool in the sixth minute, Kenny Dalglish scored in the 35th minute, and Jimmy Case scored in the 56th minute, giving Liverpool a 3–0 win in the match and a 4–2 win on aggregate, and securing a place in their second consecutive European Cup final.

== Match ==
=== Background ===
The final was held at Wembley, which had previously hosted three finals.

1978 was the first year in which Club Brugge had reached the final, while Liverpool were appearing in their second successive final. The two teams had met before in the final of a European competition: the 1976 UEFA Cup final, which Liverpool won 4–3 on aggregate. Liverpool were the reigning champions and were aiming to become the first British team to win successive European Cups. Liverpool had already won the UEFA Cup twice, in the 1972–73 and 1975–76 seasons and had a chance to win two European cups as well. Brugge were the first Belgian team to reach the final of the European Cup and thus were aiming to become the first to win the trophy.

As the final was held in England, at Wembley, Liverpool were clear favourites to retain the European Cup. Brugge were without a number of key players, such as Raoul Lambert, whose inclusion in the Brugge squad was rumoured before the final but never materialised. Liverpool were also without a few players. Tommy Smith, who had scored in the previous season's final, was out after dropping a pick-axe on his foot and breaking a toe. Striker David Johnson was also absent. He had strained knee ligaments during a match against Leicester City, an injury that ruled him out for the rest of the season.

=== Summary ===
The first half was dull. Brugge held back, using tight marking and the offside trap to restrict Liverpool's attacking threat. Towards the end of the first half, Liverpool started to have more scoring chances. Ray Kennedy volleyed across the face of the goal, and Jimmy Case took a free kick that needed to be punched away by Brugge goalkeeper Birger Jensen. In the closing minutes of the first half, Jensen made two crucial saves: he blocked David Fairclough, who had made a run towards goal, and he tipped a header by Alan Hansen over the crossbar. So the score at half-time was 0–0.

Early in the second half, Jensen made another save, this time from Terry McDermott. Brugge's first significant chance came a few minutes afterwards, when a cross-field pass by René Vandereycken reached Jan Sørensen on the right-hand side of the pitch. Sørensen's subsequent shot was blocked by Liverpool captain Emlyn Hughes. The blocked shot was not cleared, but Ray Clemence reached the ball before Brugge's Lajos Kű could reach it and score. After this Kű was substituted with Dirk Sanders. Liverpool made a substitution minutes later, with Steve Heighway replacing Case. Liverpool's substitution had more effect, as Heighway gave Liverpool more width on the right-hand side of the pitch. Two minutes after Heighway's introduction, Kenny Dalglish received the ball in the Brugge penalty area from a Graeme Souness pass and placed his shot over a diving Jensen to give Liverpool a 1–0 lead.

Brugge now needed to score, but they only created one more chance. Ten minutes before the end of the match, Sørensen intercepted a Hansen backpass and shot. His shot was blocked by Clemence, and a goal-line clearance by Phil Thompson prevented Brugge from equalising. The match remained at 1–0 and Liverpool won their second consecutive European Cup, becoming the first British team to retain the trophy.

=== Details ===
10 May 1978
19:15 BST/CET

Club Brugge (Belgium)	0–1	(England) Liverpool
	Report	Dalglish 64'

Wembley Stadium, London
Attendance: 92,500
Referee: Charles Corver (Netherlands)

Club Brugge	Liverpool

GK	1	(Denmark) Birger Jensen
RB	2	(Belgium) Fons Bastijns (c)
CB	4	(Belgium) Georges Leekens
CB	3	(Austria) Eduard Krieger
LB	5	(Belgium) Gino Maes		(substituted off) 71'
RM	6	(Belgium) Julien Cools
CM	7	(Belgium) René Vandereycken	(yellow card) 35'
CM	10	(Hungary) Lajos Kű		(substituted off) 58'
LM	8	(Belgium) Daniël De Cubber
CF	9	(Belgium) Jan Simoen
CF	11	(Denmark) Jan Sørensen
Substitutes:
GK	12	(Netherlands) Leen Barth
MF	13	(Belgium) Dirk Sanders		(substituted on) 58'
DF	14	(Belgium) Jos Volders		(substituted on) 71'
FW	15	(Belgium) Raoul Lambert
FW	16	(Belgium) Bernard Verheecke
Manager:
(Austria) Ernst Happel

GK	1	(England) Ray Clemence
RB	2	(England) Phil Neal
CB	4	(England) Phil Thompson
CB	3	(Scotland) Alan Hansen
LB	6	(England) Emlyn Hughes (c)
RM	8	(England) Jimmy Case	(yellow card) 29'	(substituted off) 63'
CM	10	(England) Terry McDermott
CM	11	(Scotland) Graeme Souness
LM	5	(England) Ray Kennedy
CF	7	(Scotland) Kenny Dalglish
CF	9	(England) David Fairclough
Substitutes:
MF	12	(Republic of Ireland) Steve Heighway		(substituted on) 63'
GK	13	(England) Steve Ogrizovic
DF	14	(Wales) Joey Jones
DF	15	(England) Colin Irwin
MF	16	(England) Ian Callaghan
Manager:
(England) Bob Paisley

== Post-match ==
After the match, figures from each team were critical of the other team's play. Liverpool defender Tommy Smith criticised Brugge for their approach, saying "It was a pathetic attitude. You never win anything like that." Liverpool manager Bob Paisley also criticised the Belgian team's tactics: "It takes two teams to make a game into a spectacle and Bruges only seemed to be concerned with keeping the score down. Bruges didn't come at us much – apart from one mistake in our defence, they never looked like scoring. But they were well organised at the back and it was a case of breaking them down. We controlled the game from start to finish." Meanwhile, Club Brugge manager Ernst Happel was critical of the quality of the Liverpool team: "Liverpool seemed only a shadow of the side we played in the UEFA Cup final two seasons ago. I was disappointed with them, but they deserved their victory although we were handicapped by injuries to two players."

== See also ==
- 1976 UEFA Cup final – contested between same teams
- 1977–78 Liverpool F.C. season
- 1978 European Cup Winners' Cup final
- 1978 European Super Cup
- 1978 UEFA Cup final
- Club Brugge KV in European football
- Liverpool F.C. in international football

== Bibliography ==
- Hale, Steve; Ponting, Ivan (1992). Liverpool In Europe. London: Guinness Publishing. ISBN 0-85112-569-7.
- Kelly, Stephen F. (1988). You'll Never Walk Alone. London: Queen Anne Press. ISBN 0-356-19594-5.
- Liversedge, Stan (1991). Liverpool: The Official Centenary History. London: Hamlyn Publishing Group. ISBN 0-600-57308-7.
