= Jos Volders =

Belgian footballer (born 1949)

Jozef Volders
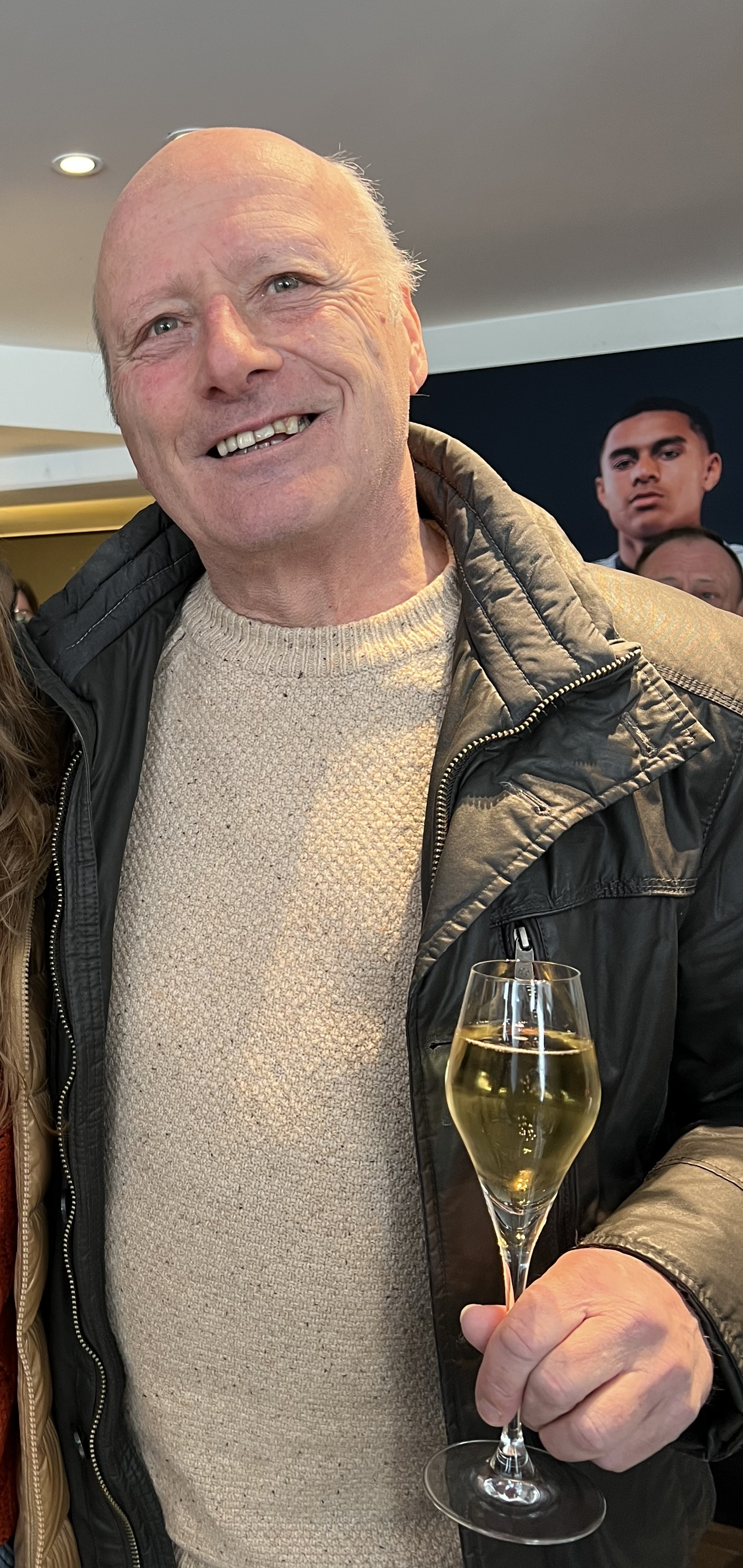

Personal information
- Full name: Jozef 'Jos' Volders
- Date of birth: 30 December 1949 (age 76)
- Place of birth: Kwaadmechelen, Belgium
- Position: Left back

Youth career
- 1961–1965: Taxandria Kwaadmechelen
- 1965–1967: R.S.C. Anderlecht

Senior career*
Years	Team	Apps	(Gls)
1967–1974	R.S.C. Anderlecht	104	(4)
1974–1982	Club Brugge	183	(8)
1982–1984	K.V. Mechelen		
1984–1986	Eendracht Aalter		
Total		187	(12)

International career
1977	Belgium	1	(0)
- * Club domestic league appearances and goals

Jos Volders (born 30 December 1949, in Kwaadmechelen) is a Belgian former footballer who played as a left back.

== Honours ==
=== Player ===
RSC Anderlecht

- Belgian First Division: 1967–68, 1971–72, 1973–74
- Belgian Cup: 1971–72, 1972–73
- Belgian League Cup: 1973, 1974
- Inter-Cities Fairs Cup: 1969–70 (runners-up)

Club Brugge

- Belgian First Division: 1975–76, 1976–77, 1977–78, 1979–80
- Belgian Cup: 1976–77
- UEFA Cup: 1975–76 (runner-up)
- European Cup: 1977–78 (runner-up)
- Jules Pappaert Cup: 1978
