= Birger Jensen =

Danish footballer (1951–2023)

- Jensen with Club Brugge

Personal information
- Full name: Birger Quistorff Jensen
- Date of birth: 1 March 1951
- Place of birth: Copenhagen, Denmark
- Date of death: 4 April 2023 (aged 72)
- Place of death: Brugge, Belgium
- Height: 1.86 m (6 ft 1 in)
- Position: Goalkeeper

Senior career*
| Years | Team | Apps | (Gls) |
| 1971–1974 | B 1903 | | |
| 1974–1988 | Club Brugge | 328 | (0) |
| 1988 | Lierse | 3 | (0) |
| 1989 | RKC | 6 | (0) |

International career
| 1973–1979 | Denmark | 19 | (0) |
- * Club domestic league appearances and goals

Birger Quistorff Jensen (Danish pronunciation: [ˈpiɐ̯ˀwɐ ˈjensn̩]; 1 March 1951 – 4 April 2023) was a Danish professional footballer who played as a goalkeeper, spending most of his career with Belgian club Club Brugge.

== Club career ==
Jensen started his career with Danish club B 1903, before moving abroad to play professionally with Club Brugge in 1974. With Club Brugge, he won five Belgian First Division championships and two Belgian Cups. He reached 1976 UEFA Cup Final and the 1978 European Cup Final and lost both to English side Liverpool. After his brilliant display in the final of the 1978 European Cup, the international press called him the best goalkeeper in the world. He played a total of 390 games for the Belgian side in all competitions and scored two goals.One of this was a penalty kick goal vs Tottenham.

He left Club Brugge in 1988, and went on to play for Belgian club Lierse SK and Dutch club RKC Waalwijk, before ending his career back in Belgium with amateur side FC Varsenare.

== International career ==
Jensen made his debut for Denmark in a September 1973 Nordic Football Championship match away against Norway and earned a total of 19 caps, scoring no goals. His final international was a November 1979 friendly match away against Spain.

== Death ==
Jensen died in April 2023, at the age of 72.

== Honours ==
=== Player ===
Club Brugge

- Belgian First Division: 1975–76, 1976–77, 1977–78, 1979–80, 1987–88
- Belgian Cup: 1976–77, 1985–86; runner-up 1978–79, 1982–83
- Belgian Supercup: 1980, 1986
- UEFA Cup runner-up: 1975–76
- European Champion Clubs' Cup runner-up: 1977–78
- Jules Pappaert Cup: 1978
- Bruges Matins: 1979, 1981, 1984
- Japan Cup Kirin World Soccer: 1981
