= Daniël De Cubber =

Belgian footballer (born 1954)

Personal information
- Full name: Daniël De Cubber
- Date of birth: 19 April 1954 (age 72)
- Position: Midfielder

Senior career*
Years	Team	Apps	(Gls)
1972–1973	Royale Union Saint-Gilloise	-	(-)
1973–1975	UR Namur	-	(-)
1975–1979	Club Brugge	107	(13)
1979–1980	RWD Molenbeek	-	(-)
1980–1981	SK Beveren	-	(-)
1981–1984	Club Brugge	44	(3)
1984–1985	RRC Tournaisien	-	(-)
- * Club domestic league appearances and goals

Daniël De Cubber (born 19 April 1954) is a former Belgian footballer. He played as defensive midfielder.

== Honours ==
=== Player ===
Club Brugge

- Belgian First Division: 1975–76, 1976–77, 1977–78
- Belgian Cup: 1976–77; 1978–79 (finalists), 1982–83 (finalists)
- UEFA Cup: 1975–76 (runners-up)
- European Champion Clubs' Cup: 1977–78 (runners-up)
- Jules Pappaert Cup: 1978
- Bruges Matins: 1981
