= Fons Bastijns =

Belgian footballer (1947–2008)

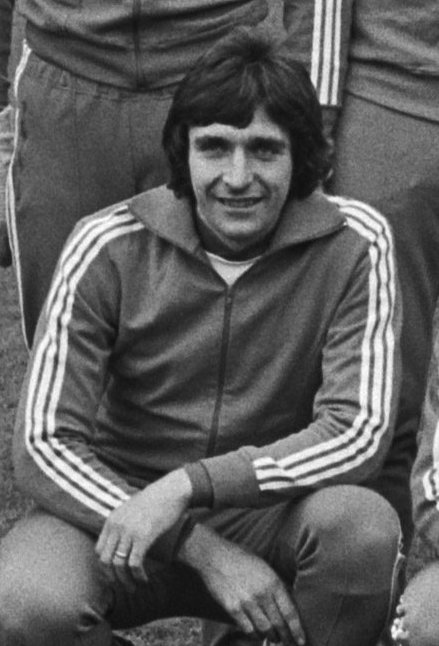

Personal information
- Full name: Alfons Bastijns
- Date of birth: 28 January 1947
- Place of birth: Meer, Belgium
- Date of death: 15 November 2008 (aged 61)
- Place of death: Bruges, Belgium
- Position: Defender

Senior career*
Years	Team	Apps	(Gls)
1965–1967	Racing White Brussels		
1967–1981	Club Brugge KV	400	(9)
1981–1982	USL Dunkerque	21	(0)

International career
1970–1977	Belgium	3	(0)

Managerial career
- K.V. Mechelen
- * Club domestic league appearances and goals

Alfons Bastijns (28 January 1947 – 15 November 2008) was a former international Belgian football defender.

== Honours ==
=== Player ===
Club Brugge

- Belgian First Division: 1972–73, 1975–76, 1976–77, 1977–78, 1979–80
- Belgian Cup: 1967–68 (winners), 1969–70 (winners), 1976–77 (winners), 1978-79 (finalists)
- Belgian Supercup: 1980
- UEFA Cup: 1975–76 (runners-up)
- European Champion Clubs' Cup: 1977–78 (runners-up)
- Jules Pappaert Cup: 1972, 1978
- Bruges Matins: 1979
