= Dirk Sanders =

Belgian footballer (born 1955)

Personal information
- Date of birth: 30 September 1955 (age 71)
- Position: Midfielder

Youth career
- VK Torhout
- Club Brugge

Senior career*
| Years | Team | Apps | (Gls) |
| 1973 – 1978 | Club Brugge | 92 | (2) |
| 1978 – 1985 | KRC Harelbeke | - | (-) |
| 1985 – 1986 | FC Eeklo | - | (-) |
- * Club domestic league appearances and goals

Dirk Sanders (born 30 September 1955) is a former Belgian footballer who played as midfielder.

== Honours ==
=== Player ===
Club Brugge

- Belgian First Division: 1975–76, 1976–77, 1977–78
- Belgian Cup: 1976–77
- UEFA Cup: 1975–76 (runner-up)
- European Cup: 1977–78 (runner-up)
- Jules Pappaert Cup: 1978
