= Norbert De Naeghel =

Former Belgian footballer

Norbert Denaeghel
Personal information
- Date of birth: November 29, 1949 (age 76)
- Position: Defender

Youth career
- Club Brugge

Senior career*
Years	Team	Apps	(Gls)
1969 – 1977	Club Brugge	116	(0)
1977 – 1979	AA Gent	-	(-)
1979 – 1984	SK Deinze	-	(-)
- * Club domestic league appearances and goals

Norbert De Naeghel (born 29 November 1949) is a former Belgian footballer who played as defender.

== Honours ==
- Club Brugge KV
- Belgian First Division: 1972–73, 1975–76, 1976–77
- Belgian Cup: 1969–70, 1976–77
- UEFA Cup: 1975-76 (runner-up)
- Jules Pappaert Cup: 1972
