= Julien Cools =

Belgian footballer

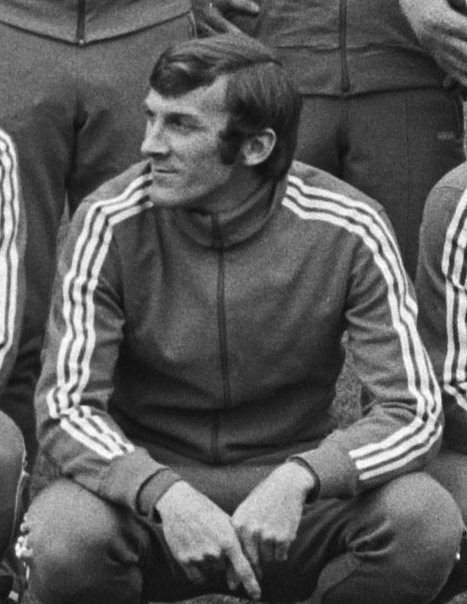
- Julien Cools in 1977

Personal information
- Full name: Julien Cools
- Date of birth: 13 February 1947 (age 79)
- Place of birth: Retie, Belgium
- Position: Midfielder

Senior career*
Years	Team	Apps	(Gls)
1969–1973	Beringen	102	(7)
1973–1979	Club Brugge	201	(34)
1979–1981	Beerschot	59	(7)
1981–1983	Dessel	46	(6)
1984–1986	Westerlo	12	(1)
Total		420	(55)

International career
1974–1980	Belgium	35	(2)

Managerial career
- 2008–: Brunei (assistant)
Medal record
Representing Belgium
UEFA European Championship
Runner-up	1980 Italy
- * Club domestic league appearances and goals

Julien Cools (born 13 February 1947) is a Belgian former footballer who won the Belgian Golden Shoe in 1977 while at Club Brugge. He was discovered as a junior at SK Retie Branddonk of Antwerp and made his name with Beringen FC. He was signed by FC Bruges in 1973 where his reputation for non-stop runner in the midfield made him an international regular. Cools helped FC Bruges to win the Belgian league titles in 1975–76, 76–77 and 77–78 plus the Belgian Cup in 1977. In Europe, Cools was a runner-up in the 1976 U.E.F.A.Cup Final and 1978 European Cup Final, Bruges losing both finals to Liverpool. He was rated by World Soccer Magazine as Bruges' best player in that 1978 Final. At 32 Cools left Bruges to join Beerschot where he enjoyed a new lease of life, becoming Captain of the national team. At the 1980 European Championship in Italy Cools played in all four of Belgium's games including the Final where they lost to West Germany. He was capped 35 times and scored two goals for the Belgium national team.

In April 2008, he accepted an offer to become the Assistant coach of the Brunei national football team.

== Honours ==
=== Player ===
Club Brugge

- Belgian First Division A: 1975–76, 1976–77, 1977–78
- Belgian Cup: 1976–77 (winners), 1978-79 (runners-up)
- UEFA Cup: 1975-1976 (runners-up)
- European Champion Clubs' Cup: 1977–78 (runners-up)

=== International ===
Belgium

- UEFA European Championship: 1980 (runners-up)
- Belgian Sports Merit Award: 1980

=== Individual ===
- Belgian Golden Shoe: 1977
