= Eduard Krieger =

Austrian footballer (1946–2019)

Edi Krieger
Personal information
- Full name: Eduard Franz Krieger
- Date of birth: 16 December 1946
- Place of birth: Vienna, Austria
- Date of death: 20 December 2019 (aged 73)
- Place of death: Vienna, Austria
- Height: 1.76 m (5 ft 9 in)
- Positions: Defender; midfielder

Youth career
- SC Simmering
- Waggonfabrik

Senior career*
Years	Team	Apps	(Gls)
1969–1975	Austria Wien	168	(14)
1975–1978	Club Brugge K.V.	88	(10)
1979	VVV-Venlo	8	(2)
1979–1983	LASK Linz	93	(14)
Total		357	(40)

International career
1970–1978	Austria	25	(0)
- * Club domestic league appearances and goals

Eduard Franz Krieger (16 December 1946 – 20 December 2019) was an Austrian international footballer.

== Club career ==
Krieger started his professional career at Austria Wien before moving abroad in 1975 to enjoy a very successful period at Ernst Happel's FC Brugge. With Brugge he won three league titles and a domestic cup title. In 1976 they reached the UEFA Cup Final against Liverpool, which they lost 4-3 on aggregate. In 1978, he again was on the losing side against Liverpool in the 1978 European Cup Final.

After a short spell at Dutch side VVV-Venlo, Krieger returned to Austria to finish his career at LASK Linz.

== International career ==
Krieger made his debut for Austria in April 1970 against Yugoslavia and was a participant at the 1978 FIFA World Cup. He earned 25 caps, no goals scored. He played his final international match in 1978.

== Honours ==
=== Player ===
Austria Wien

- Austrian Football Bundesliga: 1969-70
- Austrian Cup: 1970-71, 1973–74

Club Brugge

- Belgian First Division: 1975–76, 1976–77, 1977–78
- Belgian Cup: 1976–77
- UEFA Cup: 1975-76 (runners-up)
- European Champion Clubs' Cup: 1977-78 (runners-up)
- Jules Pappaert Cup (1): 1978
