= Raoul Lambert =

Belgian footballer

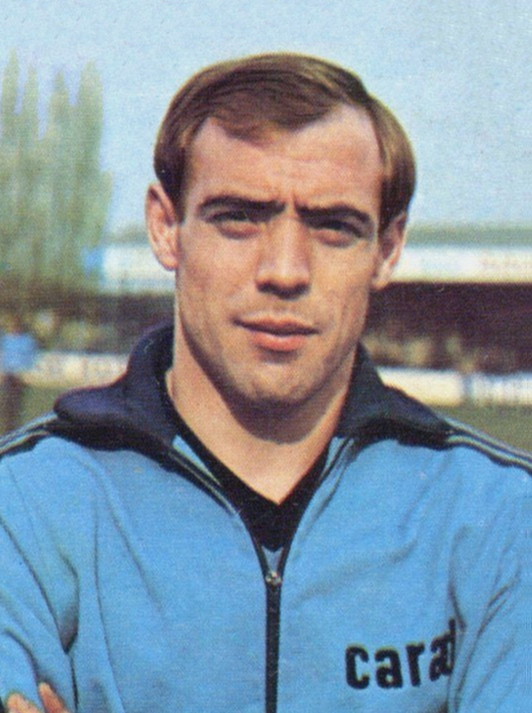
- Lambert circa 1975

Personal information
- Date of birth: 22 October 1944 (age 82)
- Place of birth: Bruges, Belgium
- Position: Striker

Youth career
- 1956–1962: Club Brugge

Senior career*
Years	Team	Apps	(Gls)
1962–1980	Club Brugge	373	(216)
Total		373	(216)

International career
1966–1977	Belgium	33	(18)
Medal record
Representing Belgium
UEFA European Championship
Bronze medal – third place	1972 Belgium
- * Club domestic league appearances and goals

Raoul Lambert (born 20 October 1944) is a Belgian retired footballer who played as a striker. He finished top scorer of the Belgian First Division with 17 goals in 1972 while playing for Club Brugge. He also scored 18 goals in 33 matches with the Belgium national team between 1966 and 1977. Lambert made his international debut on 20 April 1966 in a 3–0 friendly win against France and he scored. He was in the team for the 1970 FIFA World Cup and the Euro 72.

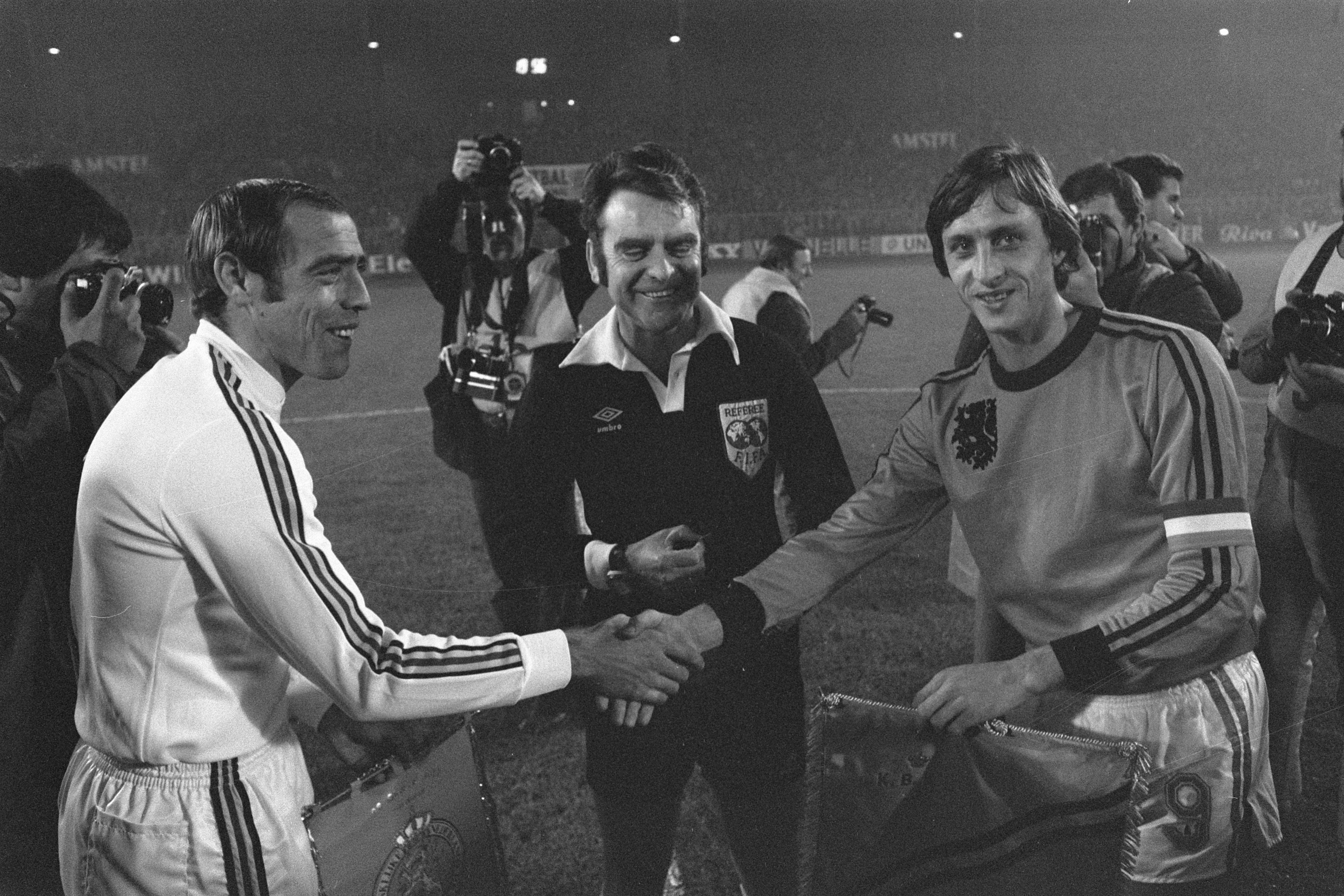
Lambert and Johan Cruyff before the start of Netherlands–Belgium in October 1977.

Throughout Lambert's career he stayed at Club Brugge, scoring a total of 270 goals in 458 matches in all competitions. He is the brother of footballer Eric Lambert.

== Honours ==
Club Brugge

- Belgian First Division: 1972–73, 1975–76, 1976–77, 1977–78, 1979–80
- Belgian Cup: 1967–68, 1969–70, 1976–77
- UEFA Cup: runner-up 1975–76
- European Cup: runner-up 1977–78
- Jules Pappaert Cup: 1972, 1978

Belgium

- UEFA European Championship: third place 1972

Individual

- Belgian First Division top scorer: 1971–72 (17 goals)
- UEFA Euro Team of the Tournament: 1972
- Best Club Brugge player of the Century: 2007
- Best West-Flanders footballer of all time: 2009
- Statue at Jan Breydel Stadium, Bruges: 2024
- Belgian Pro League Hall of Fame: 2025
