= Dirk Hinderyckx =

Belgian association football player

Personal information
- Date of birth: 15 December 1956 (age 69)
- Position: Attacking midfielder

Dirk Hinderyckx (15 December 1956) is a former Belgian footballer who played mostly as attacking midfielder.

== Honours ==
=== Player ===
==== Club Brugge ====
- Belgian First Division: 1975-76, 1976-77
- Belgian Cup: 1976-77
- UEFA Cup: 1975-1976 (runners-up)

==== AA Gent ====
- Belgian Second Division: 1979-80
