= Hugo Pieters =

Belgian footballer

Hugo Pieters (10 May 1953) is a former Belgian footballer who played as goalkeeper.

== Honours ==
Club Brugge

- Belgian First Division: 1975–76
- UEFA Cup: 1975-76 (runner-up)
