= Ulrik le Fevre =

Danish footballer, manager and agent (1946–2024)

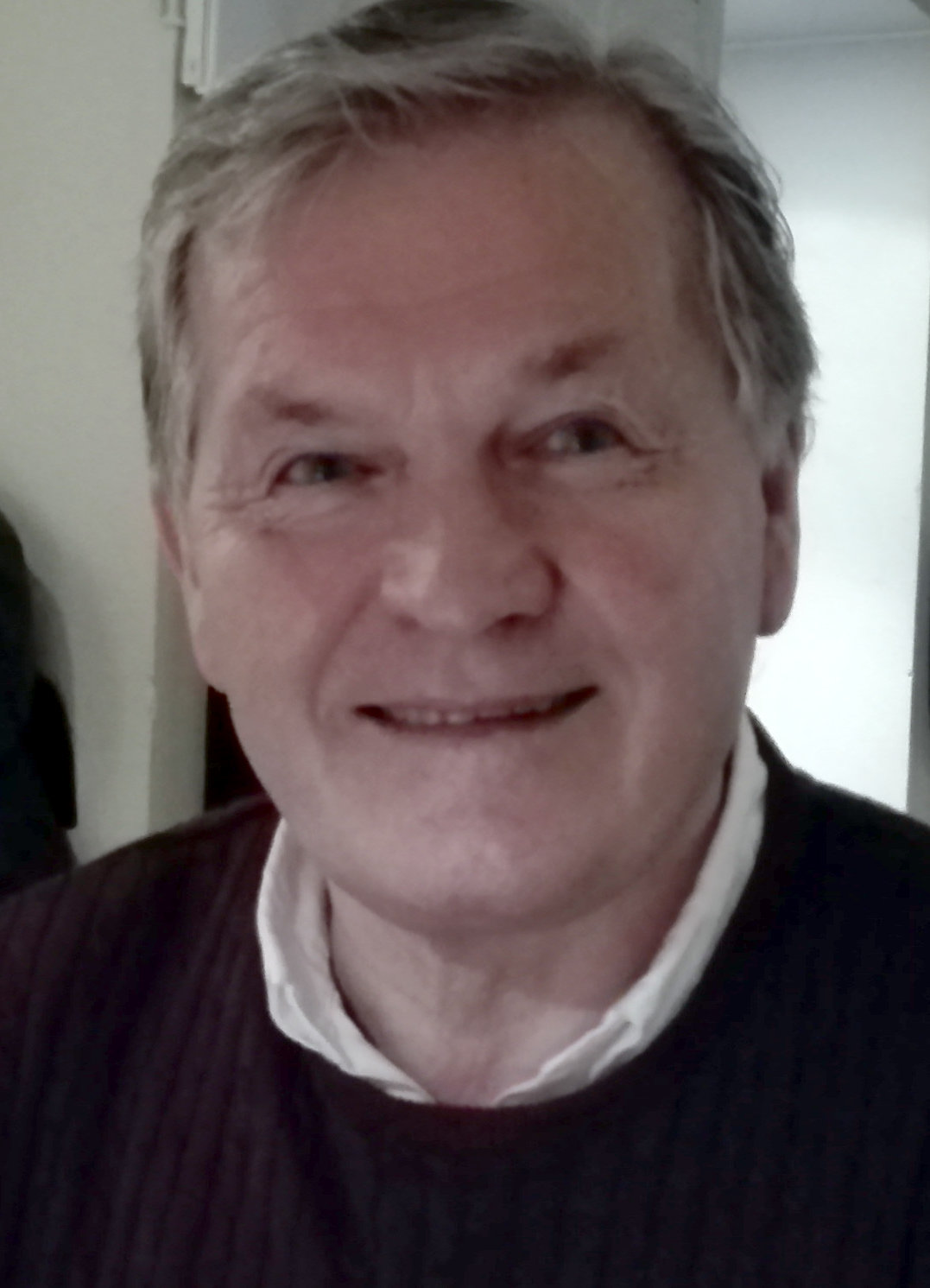
- Le Fevre in 2017

Personal information
- Date of birth: 25 June 1946
- Place of birth: Vejle, Denmark
- Date of death: 24 February 2024 (aged 77)
- Position: Left winger

Youth career
- –1956: Vejle FC
- 1956–1965: Vejle BK

Senior career*
Years	Team	Apps	(Gls)
1965–1969	Vejle BK	156	(31)
1969–1972	Borussia Mönchengladbach	90	(21)
1972–1977	Club Brugge	143	(34)
1977–1978	Vejle BK	18	(7)

International career
1965	Denmark U21	1	(0)
1965–1976	Denmark	37	(7)
- * Club domestic league appearances and goals

Ulrik le Fevre (25 June 1946 – 24 February 2024) was a Danish professional football player, manager and FIFA-licensed player agent. A right-footed left winger, he played for Danish club Vejle Boldklub, German club Borussia Mönchengladbach and Belgian club Club Brugge, and won the national championship with all three clubs. He played 37 matches and scored seven goals for the Denmark national team.

== Biography ==
Born in Vejle, le Fevre started playing for local top-flight club Vejle Boldklub. He made his senior debut in April 1965, and was called up for the Denmark under-21 national team in June 1965. He made his Denmark national team later that year, in December. After four years at Vejle, he moved abroad to play professionally in the middle of 1969.

Le Fevre signed for German club Borussia Mönchengladbach. Due to the Danish rules of amateurism, le Fevre's national team career went on hiatus in June 1969, after 28 national games. When the Danish rule of amateurism was abolished in 1971, le Fevre returned to the Danish national team in June 1971. With Mönchengladbach, he won the 1970 and 1971 Bundesliga championships. His most notable goal was scored in the 1971–72 Bundesliga season. In a November 1971 game against Schalke 04, he juggled the ball twice in the opposition penalty area before volleying the ball into the net. The goal was awarded the 1971 "Tor des Jahres".

In 1972, Mönchengladbach bought Danish striker Henning Jensen, and le Fevre moved on to play for Club Brugge in Belgium. At Club Brugge, he won three Belgian League championships, in 1973, 1976 and 1977, as well as the 1977 Belgian Cup. He moved back to Denmark in July 1977, and ended his career back with childhood club Vejle Boldklub. He won the 1978 Danish championship, making him the first Danish player to win the championship in three countries. He retired in November 1978, having played a total 156 games and scored 31 goals for Vejle Boldklub.

Le Fevre died after a prolonged illness on 24 February 2024, at the age of 77.

== Honours ==
Borussia Mönchengladbach

- Bundesliga: 1969–70, 1970–71

Club Brugge

- Belgian First Division: 1972–73, 1975–76, 1976–77
- Belgian Cup: 1976–77
- UEFA Cup: runner-up 1975–76
- Jules Pappaert Cup: 1972

Vejle BK

- Danish championship: 1978

Individual

- German Goal of the Year award: 1971
