= Konrad Holenstein =

Liechtensteiner footballer

Personal information
- Date of birth: 18 August 1948 (age 78)
- Position: Forward

Senior career*
Years	Team	Apps	(Gls)
1969–1970	Grasshopper Club Zürich		
1970–1972	TSV 1860 München		
1972–1974	FC Fribourg		
1974–1975	FC Lugano		
1975–1976	Club Brugge KV		
1979–1980	FC Balzers		
1980–1984	FC Nordstern Basel		

Managerial career
- 1980–1984: FC Nordstern Basel (player-manager)
- 1984–1985: SC Zug
- 1986: FC Schaffhausen (caretaker)
- * Club domestic league appearances and goals

Konrad Holenstein (born 18 August 1948) is a retired Liechtensteiner football striker and later manager.
