= Club Brugge KV in European football =

== European record ==
=== Overall record ===
Fully up to date as of 21 October 2026.

| Tournament | Pld | W | D | L | GF | GA | GD | Win% |
|---|---|---|---|---|---|---|---|---|
| European Cup / UEFA Champions League | 156 | 57 | 34 | 65 | 213 | 238 | −25 | 36.54 |
| UEFA Cup / UEFA Europa League | 182 | 79 | 42 | 61 | 298 | 238 | +60 | 43.41 |
| UEFA Europa Conference League | 18 | 12 | 3 | 3 | 42 | 15 | +27 | 66.67 |
| UEFA Cup Winners' Cup | 28 | 15 | 3 | 10 | 41 | 33 | +8 | 53.57 |
| Inter-Cities Fairs Cup | 6 | 2 | 1 | 3 | 11 | 10 | +1 | 33.33 |
| Total | 390 | 165 | 83 | 142 | 605 | 534 | +71 | 42.31 |

=== Matches ===
- Q = qualification round
- PO = play-off
- KPO = knockout play-off
- R = round
- Group = group stage / Group 1 = first group stage / Group 2 = second group stage
- League = league phase
- 1/8 = eighth finals / 1/4 = quarter-finals / 1/2 = semi-finals
- F = final
- PUC = points UEFA coefficient

| Season | Competition | Round | Country | Opponent | Score | PUC |
|---|---|---|---|---|---|---|
| 1967–68 | Inter-Cities Fairs Cup | 1R | (Portugal) | Sporting CP | 0–0, 1–2 | 1.0 |
| 1968–69 | Cup Winners' Cup | 1R | (England) | West Bromwich Albion | 3–1, 0–2 | 2.0 |
| 1969–70 | Inter-Cities Fairs Cup | 1R | (Spain) | Sabadell | 0–2, 5–1 | 4.0 |
| 1969–70 | Inter-Cities Fairs Cup | 2R | (Hungary) | Újpest Dózsa | 5–2, 0–3 | 4.0 |
| 1970–71 | Cup Winners' Cup | 1R | (Germany) | Kickers Offenbach | 1–2, 2–0 | 7.0 |
| 1970–71 | Cup Winners' Cup | 1/8 | (Switzerland) | Zürich | 2–0, 2–3 | 7.0 |
| 1970–71 | Cup Winners' Cup | 1/4 | (England) | Chelsea | 2–0, 0–4 | 7.0 |
| 1971–72 | UEFA Cup | 1R | (Socialist Federal Republic of Yugoslavia) | Željezničar Sarajevo | 0–3, 3–1 | 2.0 |
| 1972–73 | UEFA Cup | 1R | (Sweden) | Åtvidaberg | 5–3, 1–2 | 4.0 |
| 1972–73 | UEFA Cup | 2R | (Portugal) | Porto | 0–3, 3–2 | 4.0 |
| 1973–74 | European Cup | 1R | (Malta) | Floriana | 8–0, 2–0 | 6.0 |
| 1973–74 | European Cup | 2R | (Switzerland) | Basel | 2–1, 4–6 | 6.0 |
| 1975–76 | UEFA Cup | 1R | (France) | Lyon | 3–4, 3–0 | 17.0 |
| 1975–76 | UEFA Cup | 2R | (England) | Ipswich Town | 0–3, 4–0 | 17.0 |
| 1975–76 | UEFA Cup | 1/8 | (Italy) | Roma | 1–0, 1–0 | 17.0 |
| 1975–76 | UEFA Cup | 1/4 | (Italy) | Milan | 2–0, 1–2 | 17.0 |
| 1975–76 | UEFA Cup | 1/2 | (Germany) | Hamburger SV | 1–1, 1–0 | 17.0 |
| 1975–76 | UEFA Cup | F | (England) | Liverpool | 2–3, 1–1 | 17.0 |
| 1976–77 | European Cup | 1R | (Romania) | Steaua București | 2–1, 1–1 | 8.0 |
| 1976–77 | European Cup | 1/8 | (Spain) | Real Madrid | 0–0, 2–0 | 8.0 |
| 1976–77 | European Cup | 1/4 | (Germany) | Borussia Mönchengladbach | 2–2, 0–1 | 8.0 |
| 1977–78 | European Cup | 1R | (Finland) | KuPS | 4–0, 5–2 | 13.0 |
| 1977–78 | European Cup | 1/8 | (Greece) | Panathinaikos | 2–0, 0–1 | 13.0 |
| 1977–78 | European Cup | 1/4 | (Spain) | Atlético Madrid | 2–0, 2–3 | 13.0 |
| 1977–78 | European Cup | 1/2 | (Italy) | Juventus | 0–1, 2–0 | 13.0 |
| 1977–78 | European Cup | F | (England) | Liverpool | 0–1 | 13.0 |
| 1978–79 | European Cup | 1R | (Poland) | Wisła Kraków | 2–1, 1–3 | 2.0 |
| 1980–81 | European Cup | 1R | (Switzerland) | Basel | 0–1, 1–4 | 0.0 |
| 1981–82 | UEFA Cup | 1R | (Soviet Union) | Spartak Moscow | 1–3, 1–3 | 0.0 |
| 1984–85 | UEFA Cup | 1R | (England) | Nottingham Forest | 0–0, 1–0 | 5.0 |
| 1984–85 | UEFA Cup | 2R | (England) | Tottenham Hotspur | 2–1, 0–3 | 5.0 |
| 1985–86 | UEFA Cup | 1R | (Portugal) | Boavista | 3–4, 3–1 | 2.0 |
| 1985–86 | UEFA Cup | 2R | (Russia) | Spartak Moscow | 0–1, 1–3 | 2.0 |
| 1986–87 | Cup Winners' Cup | 1R | (Austria) | Rapid Wien | 3–4, 3–3 | 1.0 |
| 1987–88 | UEFA Cup | 1R | (Soviet Union) | Zenit St. Petersburg | 0–2, 5–0 | 13.0 |
| 1987–88 | UEFA Cup | 2R | (Socialist Federal Republic of Yugoslavia) | Red Star Belgrade | 1–3, 4–0 | 13.0 |
| 1987–88 | UEFA Cup | 1/8 | (Germany) | Borussia Dortmund | 0–3, 5–0 | 13.0 |
| 1987–88 | UEFA Cup | 1/4 | (Greece) | Panathinaikos | 2–2, 1–0 | 13.0 |
| 1987–88 | UEFA Cup | 1/2 | (Spain) | Espanyol | 2–0, 0–3 | 13.0 |
| 1988–89 | European Cup | 1R | (Denmark) | Brøndby | 1–0, 1–2 | 4.0 |
| 1988–89 | European Cup | 1/8 | (France) | Monaco | 1–0, 1–6 | 4.0 |
| 1989–90 | UEFA Cup | 1R | (Netherlands) | Twente | 0–0, 4–1 | 3.0 |
| 1989–90 | UEFA Cup | 2R | (Austria) | Rapid Wien | 1–2, 3–4 | 3.0 |
| 1990–91 | European Cup | 1R | (Norway) | Lillestrøm | 1–1, 2–0 | 4.0 |
| 1990–91 | European Cup | 1/8 | (Italy) | Milan | 0–0, 0–1 | 4.0 |
| 1991–92 | Cup Winners' Cup | 1R | (Cyprus) | Omonia | 2–0, 2–0 | 14.0 |
| 1991–92 | Cup Winners' Cup | 1/8 | (Poland) | Katowice | 1–0, 3–0 | 14.0 |
| 1991–92 | Cup Winners' Cup | 1/4 | (Spain) | Atlético Madrid | 2–3, 2–1 | 14.0 |
| 1991–92 | Cup Winners' Cup | 1/2 | (Germany) | Werder Bremen | 1–0, 0–2 | 14.0 |
| 1992–93 | Champions League | 1R | (Israel) | Maccabi Tel Aviv | 1–0, 3–0 | 13.0 |
| 1992–93 | Champions League | 2R | (Austria) | Austria Wien | 2–0, 1–3 | 13.0 |
| 1992–93 | Champions League | Group | (Russia) | CSKA Moscow | 1–0, 2–1 | 13.0 |
| 1992–93 | Champions League | Group | (France) | Marseille | 0–3, 0–1 | 13.0 |
| 1992–93 | Champions League | Group | (Scotland) | Rangers | 1–1, 1–2 | 13.0 |
| 1994–95 | Cup Winners' Cup | 1R | (Republic of Ireland) | Sligo Rovers | 2–1, 3–1 | 10.0 |
| 1994–95 | Cup Winners' Cup | 1/8 | (Greece) | Panathinaikos | 1–0, 0–0 | 10.0 |
| 1994–95 | Cup Winners' Cup | 1/4 | (England) | Chelsea | 1–0, 0–2 | 10.0 |
| 1995–96 | Cup Winners' Cup | 1R | (Ukraine) | Shakhtar Donetsk | 1–0, 1–1 | 3.0 |
| 1995–96 | Cup Winners' Cup | 1/8 | (Spain) | Zaragoza | 1–2, 0–1 | 3.0 |
| 1996–97 | Champions League | Q | (Romania) | Steaua București | 2–2, 0–3 | 9.0 |
| 1996–97 | UEFA Cup | 1R | (Denmark) | Lyngby | 1–1, 2–0 | 9.0 |
| 1996–97 | UEFA Cup | 2R | (Romania) | Naţional București | 2–0, 1–1 | 9.0 |
| 1996–97 | UEFA Cup | 3R | (Germany) | Schalke 04 | 2–1, 0–2 | 9.0 |
| 1997–98 | UEFA Cup | 2Q | (Slovenia) | Gorica | 5–3, 3–0 | 8.0 |
| 1997–98 | UEFA Cup | 1R | (Israel) | Beitar Jerusalem | 1–2, 3–0 | 8.0 |
| 1997–98 | UEFA Cup | 2R | (Germany) | VfL Bochum | 1–0, 1–4 | 8.0 |
| 1998–99 | Champions League | 1Q | (North Macedonia) | Sileks | 0–0, 2–1 | 8.5 |
| 1998–99 | Champions League | 2Q | (Norway) | Rosenborg | 0–2, 4–2 | 8.5 |
| 1998–99 | UEFA Cup | 1R | (Hungary) | Újpest | 5–0, 2–2 | 8.5 |
| 1998–99 | UEFA Cup | 2R | (Germany) | VfB Stuttgart | 1–1, 3–2 | 8.5 |
| 1998–99 | UEFA Cup | 1/8 | (France) | Lyon | 0–1, 3–4 | 8.5 |
| 1999–2000 | UEFA Cup | Q | (Estonia) | Tulevik Viljandi | 3–0, 2–0 | 4.0 |
| 1999–2000 | UEFA Cup | 1R | (Israel) | Hapoel Haifa | 1–3, 4–2 | 4.0 |
| 2000–01 | UEFA Cup | Q | (Estonia) | Flora Tallinn | 4–1, 2–0 | 10.0 |
| 2000–01 | UEFA Cup | 1R | (Cyprus) | APOEL | 2–0, 1–0 | 10.0 |
| 2000–01 | UEFA Cup | 2R | (Switzerland) | St. Gallen | 2–1, 1–1 | 10.0 |
| 2000–01 | UEFA Cup | 3R | (Spain) | Barcelona | 0–2, 1–1 | 10.0 |
| 2001–02 | UEFA Cup | Q | (Iceland) | ´ÍA | 4–0, 6–1 | 11.0 |
| 2001–02 | UEFA Cup | 1R | (Cyprus) | Olympiakos | 2–2, 7–1 | 11.0 |
| 2001–02 | UEFA Cup | 2R | (Ukraine) | Arsenal Kyiv | 2–0, 5–0 | 11.0 |
| 2001–02 | UEFA Cup | 3R | (France) | Lyon | 4–1, 0–3 | 11.0 |
| 2002–03 | Champions League | 2Q | (Romania) | Dinamo București | 3–1, 1–0 | 8.0 |
| 2002–03 | Champions League | 3Q | (Ukraine) | Shakhtar Donetsk | 1–1, 1–1 (pen.: 4–1) | 8.0 |
| 2002–03 | Champions League | Group | (Spain) | Barcelona | 2–3, 0–1 | 8.0 |
| 2002–03 | Champions League | Group | (Russia) | Lokomotiv Moscow | 0–0, 0–2 | 8.0 |
| 2002–03 | Champions League | Group | (Turkey) | Galatasaray | 0–0, 3–1 | 8.0 |
| 2002–03 | UEFA Cup | 3R | (Germany) | VfB Stuttgart | 1–2, 0–1 | 8.0 |
| 2003–04 | Champions League | 3Q | (Germany) | Borussia Dortmund | 2–1, 1–2 (pen.: 4–2) | 11.0 |
| 2003–04 | Champions League | Group | (Spain) | Celta Vigo | 1–1, 1–1 | 11.0 |
| 2003–04 | Champions League | Group | (Netherlands) | Ajax | 0–2, 2–1 | 11.0 |
| 2003–04 | Champions League | Group | (Italy) | Milan | 1–0, 0–1 | 11.0 |
| 2003–04 | UEFA Cup | 3R | (Hungary) | Debrecen | 1–0, 0–0 | 11.0 |
| 2003–04 | UEFA Cup | 1/8 | (France) | Bordeaux | 1–3, 0–1 | 11.0 |
| 2004–05 | Champions League | 2Q | (Bulgaria) | Lokomotiv Plovdiv | 2–0, 4–0 | 10.5 |
| 2004–05 | Champions League | 3Q | (Ukraine) | Shakhtar Donetsk | 1–4, 2–2 | 10.5 |
| 2004–05 | UEFA Cup | 1R | (France) | Châteauroux | 4–0, 2–1 | 10.5 |
| 2004–05 | UEFA Cup | Group | (Ukraine) | Dnipro Dnipropetrovsk | 2–3 | 10.5 |
| 2004–05 | UEFA Cup | Group | (Netherlands) | Utrecht | 1–0 | 10.5 |
| 2004–05 | UEFA Cup | Group | (Austria) | Austria Wien | 1–1 | 10.5 |
| 2004–05 | UEFA Cup | Group | (Spain) | Zaragoza | 1–1 | 10.5 |
| 2005–06 | Champions League | 3Q | (Norway) | Vålerenga | 0–1, 1–0 (pen.: 4–3) | 9.0 |
| 2005–06 | Champions League | Group | (Italy) | Juventus | 1–2, 0–1 | 9.0 |
| 2005–06 | Champions League | Group | (Germany) | Bayern Munich | 0–1, 1–1 | 9.0 |
| 2005–06 | Champions League | Group | (Austria) | Rapid Wien | 1–0, 3–2 | 9.0 |
| 2005–06 | UEFA Cup | 3R | (Italy) | Roma | 1–2, 1–2 | 9.0 |
| 2006–07 | UEFA Cup | 2Q | (Lithuania) | Sūduva | 2–0, 5–2 | 7.0 |
| 2006–07 | UEFA Cup | 1R | (Slovakia) | Ružomberok | 1–0, 1–1 | 7.0 |
| 2006–07 | UEFA Cup | Group | (Germany) | Bayer Leverkusen | 1–1 | 7.0 |
| 2006–07 | UEFA Cup | Group | (England) | Tottenham Hotspur | 1–3 | 7.0 |
| 2006–07 | UEFA Cup | Group | (Romania) | Dinamo București | 1–1 | 7.0 |
| 2006–07 | UEFA Cup | Group | (Turkey) | Beşiktaş | 1–2 | 7.0 |
| 2007–08 | UEFA Cup | 1R | (Norway) | Brann | 1–0, 1–2 | 2.0 |
| 2008–09 | UEFA Cup | 1R | (Switzerland) | Young Boys | 2–2, 2–0 | 6.0 |
| 2008–09 | UEFA Cup | Group | (Norway) | Rosenborg | 0–0 | 6.0 |
| 2008–09 | UEFA Cup | Group | (France) | Saint-Étienne | 1–1 | 6.0 |
| 2008–09 | UEFA Cup | Group | (Spain) | Valencia | 1–1 | 6.0 |
| 2008–09 | UEFA Cup | Group | (Denmark) | Copenhagen | 0–1 | 6.0 |
| 2009–10 | Europa League | 3Q | (Finland) | Lahti | 3–2, 1–1 | 12.5 |
| 2009–10 | Europa League | PO | (Poland) | Lech Poznań | 0–1, 1–0 (pen.: 4–3) | 12.5 |
| 2009–10 | Europa League | Group | (Ukraine) | Shakhtar Donetsk | 1–4, 0–0 | 12.5 |
| 2009–10 | Europa League | Group | (France) | Toulouse | 2–2, 1–0 | 12.5 |
| 2009–10 | Europa League | Group | (Serbia) | Partizan | 2–0, 4–2 | 12.5 |
| 2009–10 | Europa League | 2R | (Spain) | Valencia | 1–0, 0–3 | 12.5 |
| 2010–11 | Europa League | PO | (Belarus) | Dinamo Minsk | 2–1, 3–2 | 5.0 |
| 2010–11 | Europa League | Group | (Spain) | Villarreal | 1–2, 1–2 | 5.0 |
| 2010–11 | Europa League | Group | (Croatia) | Dinamo Zagreb | 0–0, 0–2 | 5.0 |
| 2010–11 | Europa League | Group | (Greece) | PAOK | 1–1, 1–1 | 5.0 |
| 2011–12 | Europa League | 3Q | (Azerbaijan) | Qarabağ | 4–1, 0–1 | 10.5 |
| 2011–12 | Europa League | PO | (Georgia (country)) | Zestaponi | 3–3, 2–0 | 10.5 |
| 2011–12 | Europa League | Group | (Slovenia) | Maribor | 2–0, 4–3 | 10.5 |
| 2011–12 | Europa League | Group | (Portugal) | Braga | 2–1, 1–1 | 10.5 |
| 2011–12 | Europa League | Group | (England) | Birmingham City | 1–2, 2–2 | 10.5 |
| 2011–12 | Europa League | 2R | (Germany) | Hannover 96 | 1–2, 0–1 | 10.5 |
| 2012–13 | Champions League | 3Q | (Denmark) | Copenhagen | 0–0, 2–3 | 5.5 |
| 2012–13 | Europa League | PO | (Hungary) | Debrecen | 3–0, 4–1 | 5.5 |
| 2012–13 | Europa League | Group | (France) | Bordeaux | 0–4, 1–2 | 5.5 |
| 2012–13 | Europa League | Group | (Portugal) | Marítimo | 2–0, 1–2 | 5.5 |
| 2012–13 | Europa League | Group | (England) | Newcastle United | 0–1, 2–2 | 5.5 |
| 2013–14 | Europa League | 3Q | (Poland) | Śląsk Wrocław | 3–3, 0–1 | 0.5 |
| 2014–15 | Europa League | 3Q | (Denmark) | Brøndby | 3–0, 2–0 | 23.0 |
| 2014–15 | Europa League | PO | (Switzerland) | Grasshoppers | 2–1, 1–0 | 23.0 |
| 2014–15 | Europa League | Group | (Italy) | Torino | 0–0, 0–0 | 23.0 |
| 2014–15 | Europa League | Group | (Finland) | Helsinki | 3–0, 2–1 | 23.0 |
| 2014–15 | Europa League | Group | (Denmark) | Copenhagen | 1–1, 4–0 | 23.0 |
| 2014–15 | Europa League | 2R | (Denmark) | AaB | 3–1, 3–0 | 23.0 |
| 2014–15 | Europa League | 3R | (Turkey) | Beşiktaş | 2–1, 3–1 | 23.0 |
| 2014–15 | Europa League | 1/4 | (Ukraine) | Dnipro | 0–0, 0–1 | 23.0 |
| 2015–16 | Champions League | 3Q | (Greece) | Panathinaikos | 1–2, 3–0 | 5.0 |
| 2015–16 | Champions League | PO | (England) | Manchester United | 1–3, 0–4 | 5.0 |
| 2015–16 | Europa League | Group | (Italy) | Napoli | 0–1, 0–5 | 5.0 |
| 2015–16 | Europa League | Group | (Denmark) | Midtjylland | 1–3, 1–1 | 5.0 |
| 2015–16 | Europa League | Group | (Poland) | Legia Warsaw | 1–0, 1–1 | 5.0 |
| 2016–17 | Champions League | Group | (England) | Leicester City | 0–3, 1–2 | 4.0 |
| 2016–17 | Champions League | Group | (Denmark) | Copenhagen | 0–2, 0–4 | 4.0 |
| 2016–17 | Champions League | Group | (Portugal) | Porto | 1–2, 0–1 | 4.0 |
| 2017–18 | Champions League | 3Q | (Turkey) | İstanbul Başakşehir | 3–3, 0–2 | 1.5 |
| 2017–18 | Europa League | PO | (Greece) | AEK Athens | 0–0, 0–3 | 1.5 |
| 2018–19 | Champions League | Group | (France) | Monaco | 1–1, 4–0 | 11.0 |
| 2018–19 | Champions League | Group | (Germany) | Borussia Dortmund | 0–1, 0–0 | 11.0 |
| 2018–19 | Champions League | Group | (Spain) | Atlético Madrid | 1–3, 0–0 | 11.0 |
| 2018–19 | Europa League | R32 | (Austria) | Red Bull Salzburg | 2–1, 0–4 | 11.0 |
| 2019–20 | Champions League | 3Q | (Ukraine) | Dynamo Kyiv | 1–0, 3–3 | 8.0 |
| 2019–20 | Champions League | PO | (Austria) | LASK | 1–0, 2–1 | 8.0 |
| 2019–20 | Champions League | Group | (Turkey) | Galatasaray | 0–0, 1–1 | 8.0 |
| 2019–20 | Champions League | Group | (Spain) | Real Madrid | 2–2, 1–3 | 8.0 |
| 2019–20 | Champions League | Group | (France) | Paris Saint-Germain | 0–5, 0–1 | 8.0 |
| 2019–20 | Europa League | R32 | (England) | Manchester United | 1–1, 0–5 | 8.0 |
| 2020–21 | Champions League | Group | (Russia) | Zenit Saint Petersburg | 2–1, 3–0 | 11.0 |
| 2020–21 | Champions League | Group | (Germany) | Borussia Dortmund | 0–3, 0–3 | 11.0 |
| 2020–21 | Champions League | Group | (Italy) | Lazio | 1–1, 2–2 | 11.0 |
| 2020–21 | Europa League | R32 | (Ukraine) | Dynamo Kyiv | 1–1, 0–1 | 11.0 |
| 2021–22 | Champions League | Group | (France) | Paris Saint-Germain | 1–1, 1–4 | 7.0 |
| 2021–22 | Champions League | Group | (Germany) | RB Leipzig | 2–1, 0–5 | 7.0 |
| 2021–22 | Champions League | Group | (England) | Manchester City | 1–5, 1–4 | 7.0 |
| 2022–23 | Champions League | Group | (Germany) | Bayer Leverkusen | 1–0, 0–0 | 17.0 |
| 2022–23 | Champions League | Group | (Portugal) | Porto | 4–0, 0–4 | 17.0 |
| 2022–23 | Champions League | Group | (Spain) | Atlético Madrid | 2–0, 0–0 | 17.0 |
| 2022–23 | Champions League | 1/8 | (Portugal) | Benfica | 0–2, 1–5 | 17.0 |
| 2023–24 | Europa Conference League | 2Q | (Denmark) | AGF | 3–0, 0–1 | 21.0 |
| 2023–24 | Europa Conference League | 3Q | (Iceland) | KA | 5–1, 5–1 | 21.0 |
| 2023–24 | Europa Conference League | PO | (Spain) | Osasuna | 2–1, 2–2 | 21.0 |
| 2023–24 | Europa Conference League | Group | (Turkey) | Beşiktaş | 1–1, 5–0 | 21.0 |
| 2023–24 | Europa Conference League | Group | (Norway) | Bodø/Glimt | 1–0, 3–1 | 21.0 |
| 2023–24 | Europa Conference League | Group | (Switzerland) | Lugano | 3–1, 2–0 | 21.0 |
| 2023–24 | Europa Conference League | 1/8 | (Norway) | Molde | 1–2, 3–0 | 21.0 |
| 2023–24 | Europa Conference League | 1/4 | (Greece) | PAOK | 1–0, 2–0 | 21.0 |
| 2023–24 | Europa Conference League | 1/2 | (Italy) | Fiorentina | 2–3, 1–1 | 21.0 |
| 2024–25 | Champions League | League | (Germany) | Borussia Dortmund | 0–3 | 15.75 |
| 2024–25 | Champions League | League | (Austria) | Sturm Graz | 1–0 | 15.75 |
| 2024–25 | Champions League | League | (Italy) | Milan | 1–3 | 15.75 |
| 2024–25 | Champions League | League | (England) | Aston Villa | 1–0 | 15.75 |
| 2024–25 | Champions League | League | (Scotland) | Celtic | 1–1 | 15.75 |
| 2024–25 | Champions League | League | (Portugal) | Sporting CP | 2–1 | 15.75 |
| 2024–25 | Champions League | League | (Italy) | Juventus | 0–0 | 15.75 |
| 2024–25 | Champions League | League | (England) | Manchester City | 1–3 | 15.75 |
| 2024–25 | Champions League | KPO | (Italy) | Atalanta | 2–1, 3–1 | 15.75 |
| 2024–25 | Champions League | 1/8 | (England) | Aston Villa | 1–3, 0–3 | 15.75 |
| 2025–26 | Champions League | 3Q | (Austria) | Red Bull Salzburg | 1–0, 3–2 | 14.5 |
| 2025–26 | Champions League | PO | (Scotland) | Rangers | 3–1, 6–0 | 14.5 |
| 2025–26 | Champions League | League | (France) | Monaco | 4–1 | 14.5 |
| 2025–26 | Champions League | League | (Italy) | Atalanta | 1–2 | 14.5 |
| 2025–26 | Champions League | League | (Germany) | Bayern Munich | 0–4 | 14.5 |
| 2025–26 | Champions League | League | (Spain) | Barcelona | 3–3 | 14.5 |
| 2025–26 | Champions League | League | (Portugal) | Sporting CP | 0–3 | 14.5 |
| 2025–26 | Champions League | League | (England) | Arsenal | 0–3 | 14.5 |
| 2025–26 | Champions League | League | (Kazakhstan) | Kairat | 4–1 | 14.5 |
| 2025–26 | Champions League | League | (France) | Marseille | 3–0 | 14.5 |
| 2025–26 | Champions League | KPO | (Spain) | Atlético Madrid | 3–3, 1–4 | 14.5 |

| Season | Competition | Round | Opponent | Home | Away | Aggregate | (Note: Round or group progressed or eliminated) |
|---|---|---|---|---|---|---|---|
| 2026–27 | Champions League | League | (England) Aston Villa | 2–3 | —N/a | | |
| 2026–27 | Champions League | League | (Italy) Inter Milan | —N/a | 4–3 | | |
| 2026–27 | Champions League | League | (France) Lens | 3–0 | —N/a | | |
| 2026–27 | Champions League | League | (Netherlands) PSV Eindhoven | —N/a | 2–1 | | |
| 2026–27 | Champions League | League | (England) Liverpool | | | | |
| 2026–27 | Champions League | League | (Italy) Napoli | | | | |
| 2026–27 | Champions League | League | (Germany) VfB Stuttgart | | | | |
| 2026–27 | Champions League | League | (Norway) Bodø/Glimt | | | | |

Total points for UEFA coefficient: 338.25.

=== Summary of best results ===
From the quarter-finals upwards:

(2 finals)

European Cup / UEFA Champions League (1):

- finalists in 1978
- quarter-finalists in 1977
- group stage (last 8) in 1993

UEFA Cup Winners' Cup:

- semi-finalists in 1992
- quarter-finalists in 1971 and 1995

UEFA Cup / UEFA Europa League (1):

- finalists in 1976
- semi-finalists in 1988
- quarter-finalists in 2015

UEFA Europa Conference League:

- semi-finalists in 2024
