= 1979–80 Belgian First Division =

77th season of top-tier football in Belgium

Belgian First Division
- Season: 1979–80

Statistics of Belgian First Division in the 1979–80 season.

== Overview ==
Location of teams in Belgian First Division 1979–80

It was contested by 18 teams, and Club Brugge K.V. won the championship.

== League standings ==
Pos	Team	Pld	W	D	L	GF	GA	GD	Pts	Qualification or relegation
1	Club Brugge K.V.	34	24	5	5	76	31	+45	53	Qualified for 1980–81 European Cup
2	Standard Liège	34	20	9	5	80	31	+49	49	Qualified for 1980–81 UEFA Cup
3	R.W.D. Molenbeek	34	19	10	5	57	28	+29	48	Qualified for 1980–81 UEFA Cup
4	K.S.C. Lokeren Oost-Vlaanderen	34	18	6	10	60	28	+32	42	Qualified for 1980–81 UEFA Cup
5	R.S.C. Anderlecht	34	17	7	10	64	34	+30	41	Qualified for 1980–81 UEFA Cup
6	Lierse S.K.	34	18	4	12	72	43	+29	40	
7	K. Waterschei S.V. Thor Genk	34	14	9	11	50	39	+11	37	Qualified for 1980–81 European Cup Winners' Cup
8	FC Winterslag	34	12	11	11	35	62	−27	35	
9	R.F.C. de Liège	34	12	9	13	51	47	+4	33	
10	Cercle Brugge K.S.V.	34	13	6	15	51	60	−9	32	
11	K.S.K. Beveren	34	11	10	13	37	45	−8	32	
12	K.S.V. Waregem	34	10	11	13	33	42	−9	31	
13	Royal Antwerp FC	34	10	8	16	42	49	−7	28	
14	Beerschot	34	8	11	15	37	52	−15	27	
15	Beringen FC	34	9	8	17	34	51	−17	26	
16	K Berchem Sport	34	7	12	15	40	61	−21	26	
17	R. Charleroi S.C.	34	8	6	20	23	66	−43	22	Relegated to Division II
18	KSC Hasselt	34	2	6	26	21	94	−73	10	Relegated to Division II

== Results ==
Home \ Away	AND	ANT	BEE	BRC	BER	BEV	CER	CLU	CHA	HAS	FCL	LIE	LOK	MOL	STA	WAR	WTG	WIN
Anderlecht		3–1	3–1	3–0	3–0	4–1	3–0	0–1	1–0	1–0	0–0	4–0	1–2	1–1	1–1	6–0	5–0	5–0
Antwerp	0–0		1–1	1–1	4–0	0–2	3–1	0–1	2–1	4–0	3–1	3–1	0–1	0–2	0–2	1–0	0–2	1–2
Beerschot	2–2	1–1		1–2	0–0	3–0	1–1	2–1	1–2	4–0	2–1	0–2	0–2	1–1	1–1	1–1	0–3	1–2
Berchem	2–3	1–3	2–0		1–0	0–2	1–3	1–5	2–0	1–0	2–2	2–0	2–3	3–3	1–1	0–0	1–1	2–2
Beringen	3–2	2–0	1–2	1–0		1–1	0–0	0–1	6–0	1–1	1–0	0–3	2–1	1–1	1–4	2–2	1–2	0–2
Beveren	3–0	0–0	0–0	2–1	1–0		1–2	2–1	1–1	1–0	1–3	1–0	1–0	3–0	0–0	0–0	0–0	1–2
Cercle Brugge	2–1	2–1	1–1	1–0	1–2	3–1		2–3	6–0	3–1	2–1	2–1	2–4	0–4	3–2	2–1	3–0	1–1
Club Brugge	3–0	5–1	2–1	4–2	1–0	3–2	2–0		7–0	4–0	2–1	4–1	2–0	1–2	1–1	1–0	3–1	4–0
Charleroi	0–3	0–0	0–1	0–0	0–3	2–0	2–0	2–1		2–0	1–1	2–3	0–0	0–1	2–1	2–0	0–1	1–1
Hasselt	0–2	1–5	1–2	1–1	2–2	1–3	2–1	2–4	3–0		0–2	0–3	1–1	0–2	0–3	0–2	0–3	1–3
Liège	1–0	1–1	2–1	4–1	1–2	0–0	5–1	3–0	0–2	7–2		3–0	1–0	2–2	1–1	2–0	2–0	0–0
Lierse	0–0	6–1	1–0	1–2	1–0	5–2	3–1	2–2	3–0	7–0	4–0		2–0	0–0	3–1	6–1	6–1	5–0
Lokeren	0–1	1–0	4–0	6–1	3–0	2–0	2–1	0–1	2–0	10–1	4–1	3–1		0–0	0–1	2–1	1–0	1–2
Molenbeek	2–1	2–1	4–2	2–0	1–0	3–0	3–1	0–0	4–0	4–0	2–1	1–0	1–1		0–1	2–0	2–0	3–1
Standard Liège	5–2	2–1	4–1	1–1	4–0	3–3	3–0	1–2	4–1	0–0	1–0	5–2	2–1	3–1		1–0	2–0	12–0
Waregem	1–1	2–0	2–0	2–1	1–1	1–0	1–1	0–2	3–0	1–0	4–1	0–0	0–0	2–0	0–4		1–1	3–0
Waterschei Thor	0–1	2–3	1–1	1–1	3–0	3–1	3–1	1–1	3–0	4–0	4–0	2–1	0–0	1–1	1–3	1–1		2–0
Winterslag	2–1	0–0	1–2	2–2	2–1	1–1	1–1	1–1	2–0	1–1	1–1	0–2	0–3	1–0	1–0	1–0	0–3	

Legend: Blue = home team win; Yellow = draw; Red = away team win.

== Attendances ==
#	Club	Average
1	Standard	22,235
2	Anderlecht	20,294
3	Club Brugge	19,118
4	RWDM	11,588
5	Liège	11,235
6	Beveren	10,235
7	Lokeren	9,971
8	Lierse	9,865
9	Waterschei	8,912
10	Charleroi	8,559
11	Beringen	8,500
12	Beerschot	8,029
13	Winterslag	8,029
14	Antwerp	7,665
15	Cercle	7,000
16	Waregem	6,618
17	Hasselt	6,341
18	Berchem	6,235
