= 1977–78 Belgian First Division =

75th season of top-tier football in Belgium

Belgian First Division
- Season: 1977–78

Statistics of Belgian First Division in the 1977–78 season.

== Overview ==
Location of teams in Belgian First Division 1977–78

It was contested by 18 teams, and Club Brugge K.V. won the championship.

== League standings ==
Pos	Team	Pld	W	D	L	GF	GA	GD	Pts	Qualification or relegation
1	Club Brugge K.V.	34	22	7	5	73	48	+25	51	Qualified for 1978–79 European Cup.
2	R.S.C. Anderlecht	34	22	6	6	69	24	+45	50	Qualified for 1978–79 European Cup Winners' Cup. (Note: R.S.C. Anderlecht qualified for the next season's European Cup Winners' Cup as holders.)
3	Standard Liège	34	20	9	5	70	33	+37	49	Qualified for 1978–79 UEFA Cup.
4	Lierse S.K.	34	21	5	8	70	41	+29	47	Qualified for 1978–79 UEFA Cup.
5	K.S.K. Beveren	34	15	10	9	45	29	+16	40	Qualified for 1978–79 European Cup Winners' Cup. (Note: K.S.K. Beveren qualified as winners of the Belgian Cup.)
6	Beerschot	34	12	15	7	59	41	+18	39	
7	R.W.D. Molenbeek	34	15	6	13	55	46	+9	36	
8	Royal Antwerp FC	34	13	10	11	44	35	+9	36	
9	FC Winterslag	34	13	8	13	50	56	−6	34	
10	Beringen FC	34	13	7	14	38	44	−6	33	
11	K.S.V. Waregem	34	12	8	14	43	48	−5	32	
12	R. Charleroi S.C.	34	12	5	17	40	56	−16	29	
13	K.S.C. Lokeren Oost-Vlaanderen	34	9	10	15	46	46	0	28	
14	R.F.C. de Liège	34	9	10	15	43	48	−5	28	
15	R.A.A. Louviéroise	34	9	7	18	29	63	−34	25	
16	K.V. Kortrijk	34	6	12	16	35	53	−18	24	
17	Cercle Brugge K.S.V.	34	4	8	22	24	65	−41	16	Relegated to Division II.
18	K Boom FC	34	4	7	23	31	88	−57	15	Relegated to Division II.

== Results ==
Home \ Away	AND	ANT	BEE	BER	BEV	BOO	CER	CLU	CHA	KOR	FCL	LIE	LOK	LOU	MOL	STA	WAR	WIN
Anderlecht		0–0	2–1	4–0	0–1	9–0	1–0	6–1	3–0	3–0	4–1	3–0	2–0	0–1	1–1	3–1	3–0	3–2
Antwerp	1–2		0–0	0–0	3–1	4–1	3–0	2–2	3–1	3–1	3–0	1–2	1–0	0–0	3–2	0–0	1–2	2–0
Beerschot	1–1	4–2		2–2	1–1	3–1	2–0	2–0	4–0	2–0	2–1	1–1	2–1	4–1	0–1	1–1	4–0	2–2
Beringen	1–0	0–0	0–0		1–5	1–0	2–1	3–0	0–2	2–2	2–1	1–1	0–1	3–0	1–0	3–1	3–0	3–1
Beveren	1–2	1–1	1–1	1–0		0–0	4–1	2–2	3–0	0–0	2–0	1–0	1–1	2–0	2–0	0–2	3–0	1–2
Boom	1–1	0–1	1–1	1–1	0–0		0–2	0–2	3–2	2–1	0–0	2–6	0–4	3–4	2–2	0–4	0–2	1–5
Cercle Brugge	0–1	0–3	1–1	2–0	1–2	0–1		1–3	2–2	2–2	0–1	0–1	1–1	2–1	1–0	1–1	0–2	1–3
Club Brugge	2–0	2–0	2–1	2–1	2–1	4–2	4–1		2–0	4–1	3–2	3–0	2–2	2–1	4–2	1–0	4–0	4–3
Charleroi	2–1	1–2	2–0	0–2	0–1	1–0	4–1	2–3		1–0	1–1	0–2	1–0	1–1	1–2	1–4	1–0	2–0
Kortrijk	0–2	2–1	2–2	1–0	0–0	2–0	1–1	2–3	2–2		2–1	0–2	2–2	2–0	0–3	0–1	1–1	3–0
Liège	0–0	0–1	1–1	0–1	0–3	3–1	2–0	1–1	1–0	1–0		5–2	2–1	8–1	0–0	1–3	2–2	1–1
Lierse	3–1	2–0	2–0	3–1	2–1	4–2	5–0	3–1	1–1	2–0	1–0		2–4	3–0	5–0	2–3	1–0	1–1
Lokeren	0–1	2–0	1–1	2–0	0–2	6–2	2–0	1–1	2–0	0–0	2–2	3–4		4–2	1–1	1–3	0–3	2–3
La Louvière	0–2	1–0	0–4	1–0	1–0	3–1	2–0	1–2	0–2	0–0	2–2	1–0	0–0		1–0	1–1	0–3	1–2
Molenbeek	2–2	3–1	5–2	3–1	0–2	0–1	1–0	0–2	5–1	5–3	4–1	2–1	1–0	2–0		1–2	1–1	3–0
Standard Liège	0–1	1–1	2–2	5–0	3–0	3–1	2–2	4–2	2–1	3–2	1–0	0–0	1–0	4–1	3–1		0–0	7–0
Waregem	1–3	1–0	2–4	0–2	0–0	3–1	5–0	1–1	2–3	0–0	0–2	1–3	1–0	4–0	0–2	3–0		2–1
Winterslag	0–2	1–1	2–1	2–1	3–0	4–1	0–0	0–0	1–2	2–1	1–0	2–3	2–0	1–1	1–0	0–2	2–2	

Legend: Blue = home team win; Yellow = draw; Red = away team win.

== Attendances ==
#	Club	Average
1	Anderlecht	18,588
2	Standard	18,118
3	Club Brugge	15,059
4	RWDM	11,647
5	Charleroi	11,000
6	Liège	10,882
7	Beveren	10,500
8	Lierse	9,529
9	RAAL	9,388
10	Winterslag	8,235
11	Beerschot	8,176
12	Waregem	8,029
13	Lokeren	7,824
14	Antwerp	7,812
15	Beringen	7,324
16	Kortrijk	6,353
17	Boom	5,894
18	Cercle	5,353
