= 1976–77 Belgian First Division =

74th season of top-tier football in Belgium

Belgian First Division
- Season: 1976–77

Statistics of Belgian First Division in the 1976–77 season.

== Overview ==
Location of teams in Belgian First Division 1976–77

It was contested by 18 teams, and Club Brugge K.V. won the championship.

== League standings ==
Pos	Team	Pld	W	D	L	GF	GA	GD	Pts	Qualification or relegation
1	Club Brugge K.V.	34	23	6	5	72	30	+42	52	Qualified for 1977–78 European Cup
2	R.S.C. Anderlecht	34	21	6	7	74	37	+37	48	Qualified for 1977–78 European Cup Winners' Cup
3	Standard Liège	34	18	9	7	51	26	+25	45	Qualified for 1977–78 UEFA Cup
4	R.W.D. Molenbeek	34	18	8	8	62	37	+25	44	Qualified for 1977–78 UEFA Cup
5	K.S.C. Lokeren Oost-Vlaanderen	34	15	8	11	53	39	+14	38	
6	K.S.V. Waregem	34	14	7	13	46	39	+7	35	
7	Royal Antwerp FC	34	13	9	12	43	49	−6	35	
8	Cercle Brugge K.S.V.	34	12	11	11	58	53	+5	35	
9	Beerschot	34	11	13	10	58	51	+7	35	
10	Lierse S.K.	34	14	6	14	47	50	−3	34	
11	FC Winterslag	34	12	8	14	44	45	−1	32	
12	K.V. Kortrijk	34	11	10	13	42	47	−5	32	
13	K.S.K. Beveren	34	11	9	14	35	43	−8	31	
14	Beringen FC	34	8	10	16	40	57	−17	26	
15	R.F.C. de Liège	34	10	5	19	39	79	−40	25	
16	R. Charleroi S.C.	34	8	9	17	30	50	−20	25	
17	KV Mechelen	34	6	8	20	38	67	−29	20	Relegated to Division II
18	A.S.V. Oostende K.M.	34	6	8	20	39	72	−33	20	Relegated to Division II

== Results ==
Home \ Away	AND	ANT	BEE	BER	BEV	CER	CLU	CHA	KOR	FCL	LIE	LOK	MEC	MOL	OST	STA	WAR	WIN
Anderlecht		4–1	1–0	1–2	2–0	6–1	2–1	3–2	2–0	1–1	3–0	3–0	3–1	2–1	4–0	1–0	2–0	4–2
Antwerp	1–0		2–1	1–1	2–1	2–1	0–0	1–0	2–2	5–0	2–1	0–2	1–1	0–0	2–1	0–0	0–2	3–1
Beerschot	3–2	2–0		3–1	1–2	1–1	1–1	1–2	2–0	1–0	6–2	1–0	3–1	2–2	1–0	1–1	2–2	2–2
Beringen	0–2	1–2	1–1		3–0	1–1	1–4	0–0	3–2	1–1	1–0	1–1	3–0	2–3	1–1	0–1	1–1	0–2
Beveren	1–1	4–1	2–1	1–3		0–0	2–1	2–1	0–0	3–1	2–1	1–1	3–0	2–0	0–0	2–0	1–0	0–1
Cercle Brugge	1–1	3–1	1–5	4–0	1–1		2–2	1–0	2–2	10–0	4–1	1–4	2–0	1–0	2–1	1–1	3–0	3–0
Club Brugge	2–0	0–0	4–1	3–0	3–0	2–0		2–0	3–1	4–0	6–2	4–1	3–1	1–0	3–1	2–1	2–0	1–0
Charleroi	2–0	2–0	1–1	0–4	2–1	3–0	0–1		2–2	3–4	0–2	1–0	2–1	0–2	1–1	0–0	0–1	2–1
Kortrijk	3–2	1–3	2–0	1–3	3–1	1–1	1–2	0–0		2–0	1–0	2–1	0–0	1–0	4–2	1–1	0–2	0–1
Liège	0–5	3–2	2–1	0–0	1–0	4–0	1–4	2–1	2–1		0–2	0–1	0–0	0–2	5–0	0–1	2–1	0–4
Lierse	2–3	2–1	2–2	1–0	2–0	0–0	0–0	5–1	2–1	2–0		2–2	1–0	2–1	0–1	0–0	2–1	1–0
Lokeren	2–3	0–2	4–1	7–0	1–0	2–3	2–2	0–0	2–1	1–1	2–1		1–1	2–0	1–0	0–2	0–0	3–1
Mechelen	1–1	2–2	2–5	3–1	2–2	2–2	0–2	3–0	2–3	2–3	0–2	1–3		0–1	4–1	0–3	3–1	1–0
Molenbeek	1–1	1–1	3–1	2–1	1–1	2–1	0–3	5–1	1–0	4–2	3–2	1–0	5–1		3–1	3–1	3–0	6–0
Oostende	1–6	4–1	1–1	1–1	2–0	0–2	2–3	0–0	0–0	6–3	1–3	1–3	0–1	2–3		5–1	2–1	0–0
Standard Liège	1–1	3–0	1–1	3–2	3–0	3–1	2–0	2–1	0–1	1–0	4–1	0–1	4–0	0–0	4–0		3–1	1–0
Waregem	3–0	2–0	2–2	1–0	2–0	2–1	4–0	2–0	2–2	3–0	1–0	0–2	1–0	1–1	6–1	0–1		0–2
Winterslag	1–2	1–2	1–1	3–1	0–0	3–1	2–1	0–0	0–1	5–0	1–1	2–1	3–2	2–2	2–0	0–2	1–1	

Legend: Blue = home team win; Yellow = draw; Red = away team win.

== Attendances ==
#	Club	Average
1	Anderlecht	20,412
2	Club Brugge	16,059
3	Standard	14,059
4	RWDM	12,610
5	Beerschot	10,412
6	Charleroi	9,971
7	Waregem	9,353
8	Kortrijk	8,912
9	Liège	8,765
10	Antwerp	8,529
11	Winterslag	8,035
12	Beveren	7,882
13	Lokeren	7,259
14	Lierse	7,118
15	Beringen	6,809
16	Mechelen	5,824
17	Cercle	5,806
18	Oostende	4,853
