= 1975–76 Belgian First Division =

73rd season of top-tier football in Belgium

Belgian First Division
- Season: 1975–76

Statistics of Belgian First Division in the 1975–76 season.

== Overview ==
Location of teams in Belgian First Division 1975–76

It was contested by 19 teams, and Club Brugge K.V. won the championship.
At the end of the season the division was reduced in size from 19 to 18 clubs, so three clubs were relegated to Division II to be replaced by two promoted clubs.

== League standings ==
Pos	Team	Pld	W	D	L	GF	GA	GD	Pts	Qualification or relegation
1	Club Brugge K.V.	36	22	8	6	81	38	+43	52	Qualified for 1976–77 European Cup.
2	R.S.C. Anderlecht	36	19	10	7	65	36	+29	48	Qualified for 1976–77 European Cup Winners' Cup.
3	R.W.D. Molenbeek	36	18	11	7	60	30	+30	47	Qualified for 1976–77 UEFA Cup.
4	K.S.C. Lokeren Oost-Vlaanderen	36	19	7	10	58	33	+25	45	Qualified for 1976–77 UEFA Cup.
5	K.S.V. Waregem	36	16	12	8	61	39	+22	44	
6	K.S.K. Beveren	36	15	14	7	41	24	+17	44	
7	Beerschot	36	16	9	11	59	54	+5	41	
8	Standard Liège	36	15	9	12	53	46	+7	39	
9	Lierse S.K.	36	14	11	11	59	44	+15	39	Qualified for 1976–77 European Cup Winners' Cup.
10	R.F.C. de Liège	36	12	11	13	59	62	−3	35	
11	Royal Antwerp FC	36	10	14	12	40	55	−15	34	
12	A.S.V. Oostende K.M.	36	10	11	15	42	61	−19	31	
13	Cercle Brugge K.S.V.	36	9	13	14	41	52	−11	31	
14	R.A.A. Louviéroise	36	7	16	13	42	59	−17	30	Relegated to Belgian Second Division.
15	KV Mechelen	36	9	11	16	45	62	−17	29	
16	R. Charleroi S.C.	36	9	9	18	47	62	−15	27	
17	Beringen FC	36	7	13	16	27	50	−23	27	
18	K Berchem Sport	36	5	11	20	22	57	−35	21	Relegated to Belgian Second Division.
19	K.R.C. Mechelen	36	6	8	22	27	65	−38	20	Relegated to Belgian Second Division.

== Results ==
Home \ Away	AND	ANT	BEE	BRC	BER	BEV	CER	CLU	CHA	FCL	LIE	LOK	LOU	KVM	RCM	MOL	OST	STA	WAR
Anderlecht		1–1	3–0	3–0	1–0	4–0	2–2	1–0	2–1	4–1	0–1	3–2	1–1	3–3	5–0	3–1	1–0	3–0	2–1
Antwerp	0–3		1–3	0–0	2–1	0–0	2–2	3–3	1–1	3–0	0–4	2–1	2–3	2–2	1–0	2–1	0–1	2–4	0–0
Beerschot	4–3	2–5		4–2	0–0	0–0	2–2	1–1	4–1	3–1	1–1	1–1	6–2	2–1	1–0	1–1	3–0	2–0	2–1
Berchem	0–1	1–1	0–1		1–2	0–3	2–2	0–2	0–3	0–0	0–1	1–1	1–2	0–1	2–0	1–4	1–1	2–2	0–4
Beringen	2–0	0–0	2–1	0–3		1–0	0–0	0–1	0–2	1–1	0–2	0–4	1–2	0–0	1–0	0–0	2–0	2–3	0–2
Beveren	2–2	5–0	4–0	0–0	1–1		2–2	2–0	2–0	1–0	1–1	2–1	0–0	1–0	2–1	1–0	1–1	1–0	0–1
Cercle Brugge	0–2	1–3	0–1	2–0	0–0	0–2		1–5	3–0	2–1	3–2	2–0	2–0	3–0	0–2	1–1	1–2	1–0	0–0
Club Brugge	3–2	0–1	4–2	4–0	3–1	0–0	1–0		5–1	2–2	5–2	0–0	3–0	5–1	3–2	1–2	5–0	3–0	0–0
Charleroi	2–2	1–1	0–1	2–0	0–0	0–1	5–1	1–1		6–1	2–1	1–2	0–0	1–1	4–1	0–1	0–1	1–2	1–1
Liège	0–0	6–2	4–1	0–1	4–1	0–0	0–0	4–2	3–2		2–2	1–2	2–2	0–0	3–0	1–2	2–1	4–2	3–2
Lierse	0–0	2–0	3–1	0–0	5–1	2–0	2–0	2–3	3–0	5–2		1–2	1–1	3–0	4–1	0–0	1–1	0–0	2–1
Lokeren	2–0	2–0	3–2	0–0	0–0	1–0	2–1	0–2	0–2	0–1	3–1		4–1	3–0	1–0	1–1	3–1	1–0	1–1
La Louvière	1–1	0–1	0–0	0–1	1–1	1–1	1–1	1–1	0–0	2–3	2–0	0–3		4–4	1–2	1–0	3–1	0–1	2–2
KV Mechelen	2–4	0–0	1–0	2–0	2–2	1–0	1–3	0–2	0–2	1–2	4–1	0–2	2–4		4–1	1–1	3–1	1–0	3–0
K.R.C. Mechelen	1–2	1–0	1–2	0–1	0–0	0–0	1–1	0–2	0–2	4–1	2–2	1–4	1–0	1–1		0–2	1–1	0–3	0–5
Molenbeek	0–2	0–0	1–2	5–0	4–0	0–2	0–0	5–3	2–0	2–1	0–0	3–1	3–1	2–1	3–0		3–0	2–0	1–0
Oostende	1–0	0–2	2–2	4–1	0–2	0–0	2–0	1–2	2–1	2–2	2–1	1–0	1–1	4–2	0–1	1–5		1–1	2–2
Standard Liège	1–1	4–0	1–0	0–0	2–1	2–3	2–1	0–1	4–3	1–1	1–0	2–1	2–2	3–0	0–0	2–2	4–2		4–1
Waregem	2–0	0–0	2–1	3–1	3–2	2–1	4–1	0–3	9–1	1–0	3–1	1–0	4–0	1–1	2–2	0–0	2–2	1–0	

Legend: Blue = home team win; Yellow = draw; Red = away team win.

== Attendances ==
#	Club	Average
1	Anderlecht	18,611
2	Club Brugge	15,667
3	Standard	14,294
4	Liège	11,417
5	RWDM	11,389
6	Charleroi	10,611
7	RAAL	10,583
8	Waregem	10,556
9	Antwerp	10,378
10	Lierse	9,722
11	Beerschot	9,389
12	Beveren	9,389
13	Lokeren	8,294
14	Beringen	7,417
15	KV Mechelen	7,056
16	Oostende	6,111
17	KRC Mechelen	5,033
18	Cercle	4,860
19	Berchem	4,454
