= Belgian Pro League top scorers =

The following is the list of Belgian Pro League top scorers by season, since the inception of the Belgian First Division A in 1895 until the present day.

Arthur Ceuleers and Jules Van Craen hold the record for most goals in a single season, with 41. Erwin Vandenbergh holds the record for most awards won, with six wins. The most recent top scorer of the Belgian Pro League is Nicolò Tresoldi.

== Criteria ==
In recent years, the criteria to determine the top scorer in the Belgian Pro League have been extended, making it nearly impossible to have two or more shared winners in a season. The criteria are currently as follows, in order:

- Number of goals scored
- Number of away goals scored
- Number of minutes played
- Number of assists
- Number of goals scored, not taking into account penalty kicks

The ranking is computed after each matchday. Until matchday three, the player who scored the most goals during the previous season will play with the image of a "golden bull" on his back. Thereafter, each matchday the leader in the standings will get the image on his shirt. The final standings are computed upon conclusion of the championship playoffs and the Europa League playoffs. The test matches to determine the final team going to the Europa League are not taken into account.

== List of top scorers ==
Key
| Player (X) | Name of the player and number of times they had won the award at that point (if more than one) |
| † | Indicates multiple award winners in the same season |
| ‡ | Indicates player also won the European Golden Shoe in the same season |
| § | Denotes the club were Belgian Pro League champions in the same season |

Belgian Pro League top scorers
| Season | Player | Nationality | Club | Goals |
|---|---|---|---|---|
| 1895–96 | Samuel Hickson | England | FC Liégeois^{§} | ? |
| 1896–97 | Samuel Hickson (2) | England | FC Liégeois | ? |
| 1897–98 | Frank König | Switzerland | Racing Club de Bruxelles | ? |
| 1898–99 | Frank König (2) | Switzerland | Racing Club de Bruxelles | ? |
| 1899–1900 | Charles Atkinson | England | Racing Club de Bruxelles^{§} | ? |
| 1900–01 | Herbert Potts | England | Beerschot AC | 26 |
| 1901–02 | Herbert Potts (2) | England | Beerschot AC | 16 |
| 1902–03 | Gustave Vanderstappen | Belgium | Union SG | ? |
| 1903–04 | Gustave Vanderstappen (2) | Belgium | Union SG^{§} | 30 |
| 1904–05 | Robert De Veen | Belgium | FC Brugeois | ? |
| 1905–06 | Robert De Veen (2) | Belgium | FC Brugeois | 26 |
| 1906–07 | Maurice Vertongen | Belgium | Racing Club de Bruxelles | 29 |
| 1907–08 | Maurice Vertongen (2) | Belgium | Racing Club de Bruxelles^{§} | 23 |
| 1908–09 | Vahram Kevorkian | Russian Empire | Racing Club de Bruxelles | 30 |
| 1909–10 | Maurice Vertongen (3) | Belgium | Union SG^{§} | 36 |
| 1910–11 | Alphonse Six | Belgium | CS Brugeois^{§} | 40 |
| 1911–12 | Maurice Bunyan | England | Racing Club de Bruxelles | 35 |
| 1912–13 | Sylva Brébart | Belgium | Daring Club de Bruxelles | 31 |
| 1913–14 | Maurice Bunyan (2) | England | Racing Club de Bruxelles | 28 |
No official championship played from 1914 to 1919 due to World War I
| 1919–20 | Honoré Vlamynck | Belgium | Daring Club de Bruxelles | 26 |
| 1920–21 | Ivan Thys | Belgium | Beerschot AC | 23 |
| 1921–22 | Ivan Thys (2) | Belgium | Beerschot AC^{§} | 21 |
| 1922–23 | Achille Meyskens | Belgium | Union SG^{§} | 24 |
| 1923–24 | Charles Jooris | Belgium | Racing Club de Bruxelles | 18 |
| 1924–25 | Joseph Taeymans | Belgium | Berchem Sport | 20 |
| 1925–26 | Laurent Grimmonprez | Belgium | RC Gent | 28 |
| 1926–27 | Lucien Fabry | Belgium | Standard CL | 28 |
| 1927–28 | Raymond Braine | Belgium | Beerschot AC^{§} | 35 |
| 1928–29 | Raymond Braine (2) | Belgium | Beerschot AC | 30 |
| 1929–30 | Pierre De Vidts | Belgium | Daring Club de Bruxelles | 26 |
| 1930–31^{†} | Jacques Secretin | Belgium | RCFC Montegnée | 21 |
| 1930–31^{†} | Joseph Van Beeck | Belgium | Antwerp FC^{§} | 21 |
| 1931–32 | Bernard Delmez | Belgium | Liersche SK^{§} | 26 |
| 1932–33 | Willy Ulens | Belgium | Antwerp FC | 26 |
| 1933–34 | Vital Van Landeghem | Belgium | Union SG^{§} | 29 |
| 1934–35 | Marius Mondelé | Belgium | Daring Club de Bruxelles | 28 |
| 1935–36 | Flor Lambrechts | Belgium | Antwerp FC | 37 |
| 1936–37 | Jean Collet | Belgium | White Star WAC | 22 |
| 1937–38 | Marius Mondelé (2) | Belgium | Daring Club de Bruxelles | 32 |
| 1938–39 | Jozef Wagner | Belgium | Antwerp FC | 31 |
Championship stopped in 1939-40 due to World War II, while in 1940-41 only an unofficial competition was played
| 1941–42 | Bert De Cleyn | Belgium | Antwerp FC | 34 |
| 1942–43^{†} | Arthur Ceuleers | Belgium | Beerschot AC | 41 |
| 1942–43^{†} | Jules Van Craen | Belgium | Liersche SK | 41 |
| 1943–44 | Jan Goossens | Belgium | OC Charleroi | 34 |
1944-45 championship not played due to World War II, while the 1945-46 season was stopped for the same reason
| 1946–47 | Jef Mermans | Belgium | Anderlecht^{§} | 39 |
| 1947–48 | Jef Mermans (2) | Belgium | Anderlecht | 23 |
| 1948–49 | René Thirifays | Belgium | Charleroi | 26 |
| 1949–50 | Jef Mermans (3) | Belgium | Anderlecht^{§} | 37 |
| 1950–51 | Albert Dehert | Belgium | Berchem Sport | 27 |
| 1951–52 | Jozef Mannaerts | Belgium | KRC Mechelen | 25 ^{[1]} |
| 1952–53 | Rik Coppens | Belgium | Beerschot AC | 35 |
| 1953–54 | Hippolyte Van Den Bosch | Belgium | Anderlecht^{§} | 29 |
| 1954–55 | Rik Coppens (2) | Belgium | Beerschot | 35 |
| 1955–56 | Jean Mathonet | Belgium | Standard | 26 |
| 1956–57 | Maurice Willems | Belgium | Gent | 35 |
| 1957–58 | Jef Vliers | Belgium | Beerschot | 25 |
| 1958–59 | Victor Wegria | Belgium | RFC Liégeois | 26 |
| 1959–60 | Victor Wegria (2) | Belgium | Liégeois | 21 |
| 1960–61 | Victor Wegria (3) | Belgium | Liégeois | 23 |
| 1961–62 | Jacky Stockman | Belgium | Anderlecht^{§} | 29 |
| 1962–63 | Victor Wegria (4) | Belgium | Liégeois | 29 |
| 1963–64 | Paul Van Himst | Belgium | Anderlecht^{§} | 26 |
| 1964–65 | Jean-Paul Colonval | Belgium | Tilleur | 25 |
| 1965–66 | Paul Van Himst (2) | Belgium | Anderlecht^{§} | 25 |
| 1966–67 | Jan Mulder | Netherlands | Anderlecht^{§} | 20 |
| 1967–68^{†} | Roger Claessen | Belgium | Standard Liège | 20 |
| 1967–68^{†} | Paul Van Himst (3) | Belgium | Anderlecht^{§} | 20 |
| 1968–69 | Antal Nagy | Hungary | Standard Liège^{§} | 20 |
| 1969–70 | Lothar Emmerich | Germany | Beerschot | 29 |
| 1970–71 | Erwin Kostedde | Germany | Standard Liège^{§} | 26 |
| 1971–72 | Raoul Lambert | Belgium | Club Brugge | 17 |
| 1972–73^{†} | Rob Rensenbrink | Netherlands | Anderlecht | 16 |
| 1972–73^{†} | Alfred Riedl | Austria | Sint-Truiden | 16 |
| 1973–74 | Attila Ladinszky | Hungary | Anderlecht^{§} | 22 |
| 1974–75 | Alfred Riedl (2) | Austria | Antwerp | 28 |
| 1975–76 | Hans Posthumus | Netherlands | Lierse | 26 |
| 1976–77 | François Van der Elst | Belgium | Anderlecht | 21 |
| 1977–78 | Harald Nickel | Germany | Standard Liège | 22 |
| 1978–79 | Erwin Albert | Germany | Beveren^{§} | 28 |
| 1979–80 | Erwin Vandenbergh^{‡} | Belgium | Lierse | 39 |
| 1980–81 | Erwin Vandenbergh (2) | Belgium | Lierse | 24 |
| 1981–82 | Erwin Vandenbergh (3) | Belgium | Lierse | 25 |
| 1982–83 | Erwin Vandenbergh (4) | Belgium | Anderlecht | 20 |
| 1983–84 | Nico Claesen | Belgium | Seraing | 27 |
| 1984–85 | Ronny Martens | Belgium | Gent | 23 |
| 1985–86 | Erwin Vandenbergh (5) | Belgium | Anderlecht^{§} | 27 |
| 1986–87 | Arnór Guðjohnsen | Iceland | Anderlecht^{§} | 19 |
| 1987–88 | Francis Severeyns | Belgium | Antwerp | 24 |
| 1988–89 | Eddie Krncevic | Australia | Anderlecht | 23 |
| 1989–90 | Frank Farina | Australia | Club Brugge^{§} | 24 |
| 1990–91 | Erwin Vandenbergh (6) | Belgium | Gent | 23 |
| 1991–92 | Josip Weber | Croatia | Cercle Brugge | 26 |
| 1992–93 | Josip Weber (2) | Croatia | Cercle Brugge | 31 |
| 1993–94 | Josip Weber (3) | Belgium^{[2]} | Cercle Brugge | 31 |
| 1994–95 | Aurelio Vidmar | Australia | Standard Liège | 22 |
| 1995–96 | Mario Stanić | Croatia | Club Brugge^{§} | 20 |
| 1996–97 | Robert Špehar | Croatia | Club Brugge | 26 |
| 1997–98 | Branko Strupar | Croatia | Genk | 22 |
| 1998–99 | Jan Koller | Czech Republic | Lokeren | 24 |
| 1999–2000^{†} | Ole Martin Årst | Norway | Gent | 30 |
| 1999–2000^{†} | Toni Brogno | Belgium | Westerlo | 30 |
| 2000–01 | Tomasz Radzinski | Canada | Anderlecht^{§} | 23 |
| 2001–02 | Wesley Sonck | Belgium | Genk^{§} | 30 |
| 2002–03^{†} | Cédric Roussel | Belgium | Mons | 22 |
| 2002–03^{†} | Wesley Sonck (2) | Belgium | Genk | 22 |
| 2003–04 | Luigi Pieroni | Belgium | Mouscron | 28 |
| 2004–05 | Nenad Jestrović | Serbia and Montenegro | Anderlecht | 18 |
| 2005–06 | Tosin Dosunmu | Nigeria | Germinal Beerschot | 18 |
| 2006–07 | François Sterchele | Belgium | Germinal Beerschot | 21 |
| 2007–08 | Joseph Akpala | Nigeria | Charleroi | 18 |
| 2008–09 | Jaime Alfonso Ruiz | Colombia | Westerlo | 18 |
| 2009–10 | Romelu Lukaku | Belgium | Anderlecht^{§} | 15 ^{[3]} |
| 2010–11 | Ivan Perišić | Croatia | Club Brugge | 22 |
| 2011–12 | Jérémy Perbet | France | Mons | 25 |
| 2012–13 | Carlos Bacca | Colombia | Club Brugge | 25 |
| 2013–14 | Hamdi Harbaoui | Tunisia | Lokeren | 22 |
| 2014–15 | Aleksandar Mitrović | Serbia | Anderlecht | 20 |
| 2015–16 | Jérémy Perbet (2) | France | Charleroi | 22 |
| 2016–17 | Łukasz Teodorczyk | Poland | Anderlecht^{§} | 22 ^{[4]} |
| 2017–18 | Hamdi Harbaoui (2) | Tunisia | Anderlecht & Zulte Waregem | 22 ^{[5]} |
| 2018–19 | Hamdi Harbaoui (3) | Tunisia | Zulte Waregem | 25 |
| 2019–20 | Dieumerci Mbokani | DR Congo | Antwerp | 18 ^{[6]} |
| 2020–21 | Paul Onuachu | Nigeria | Genk | 33 |
| 2021–22 | Deniz Undav | Germany | Union SG | 26 |
| 2022–23 | Hugo Cuypers | Belgium | Gent | 24 |
| 2023–24 | Kévin Denkey | Togo | Cercle Brugge | 27 |
| 2024–25^{†} | Adriano Bertaccini | Belgium | Sint-Truiden | 21 |
| 2024–25^{†} | Tolu Arokodare | Nigeria | Genk | 21 |
| 2025–26 | Nicolò Tresoldi | Germany | Club Brugge^{§} | 19 |

Notes

- 1 Originally, Rik Coppens was credited with the title of top scorer for the 1951–52 season with 22 goals, until in 2011 a fan noticed that Jozef Mannaerts had actually scored 23 goals that season and the title changed hands.
- 2 Josip Weber changed nationality during the 1993–94 season.
- 3 Starting with the 2009–10 season, only 30 games were played in the regular competition to decide upon the title of topscorer. In the first season, the title of top scorer was decided immediately after these 30 games. However, from the season 2010–11 on, the goals scored during the playoffs will count. If this rule had been in place during the 2009–10 season, Dorge Kouemaha would have been top scorer instead of Lukaku.
- 4 Nigerian striker Henry Onyekuru also scored 22 goals for Eupen, but the top scorer award was given to Teodorczyk as he scored more away goals than Onyekuru.
- 5 Harbaoui transferred from Anderlecht to Zulte Waregem during the winter transfer window. He scored 3 and 19 goals for respectively Anderlecht and Zulte Waregem over the course of the whole season.
- 6 The 2019–20 Belgian First Division A was stopped after 29 of 40 matches played due to the COVID-19 pandemic. At that point, both Mbokani and Canadian striker Jonathan David had scored 18 goals but Mbokani won the top scorer award as he scored more away goals than David.
