= List of RSC Anderlecht managers =

This is a list of RSC Anderlecht managers from 1920 when the first manager was appointed, to the present day.

== Managers ==
Name	Nationality	Anderlecht career	Matches	Honours
Sylvain Brébart	Belgium	1920–22	51	Promotion to First Division (3rd in Promotion in 1920–21)
Charles Bunyan Sr.	England	1922	0	In charge for 10 days before dying
Cyrille Bunyan	England	1922–25	78	Promotion to First Division (1st in Promotion in 1923–24)
Lee Thomas	England	1926–28	55	Promotion to Premier Division (2nd in First Division in 1926–27)
Florimond Plasch	Belgium	1928–31	78	Promotion to Premier Division (2nd in First Division in 1928–29)
Ferdinand Adams	Belgium	1930–32 and 1940–43	65	
Maurice Versé	Belgium	1931–33	52	
Charles Gilis	Belgium	1932–35 and 1935–36	46	Promotion to Premier Division (1st in First Division in 1934–35)
Claude Leclercq	Belgium	1933–34	32	
Ernest Churchill Smith	Ireland	1936–39 and 1948–50	138	2 Premier Division titles in 1948–49 and 1949–50
Robert Wijckaert	Belgium	1939–45	162	
Emile Defevere	Belgium	1939–45	178	
Paul Schuppen	Belgium	1945–46	6	
John Kennedy	England	1946	14	
Martin McLaren	England	1946	8	
Georges Perino	France	1946–48	58	The first Premier Division title of RSC Anderlecht in 1946–47
Bill Gormlie	England	1950–59	294	5 First Division titles in 1950–51, 1953–54, 1954–55, 1955–56 and 1958–59
Arnold Deraeymaeker	Belgium	1959–60; 1968	43	
Pierre Sinibaldi	France	1960–66 and 1969–71	293	4 First Division titles in 1961–62, 1963–64, 1964–65 and 1965–66 and 1 Cup in 1964–65
Andras Beres	Hungary; Belgium	1966–68	59	1 First Division title in 1966–67
Norberto Höfling	Romania; Belgium	1968–69	22	
Hippolyte Van Den Bosch	Belgium	1971; 1972–73	29	1 Cup in 1972–73
Georg Keßler	West Germany	1971–72	58	1 First Division title in 1971–72 and 1 Cup in 1971–72
Urbain Braems	Belgium	1973–75 and 1979–80	127	1 First Division title in 1973–74 and 1 Cup in 1974–75
Hans Croon	Netherlands	1975–76	51	1 Cup in 1975–76 and 1 European Cup Winners' Cup in 1975–76
Raymond Goethals	Belgium	1976–79; 1988–89; 1995	213	2 Cups in 1987–88 and 1988–89 and 1 European Cup Winners' Cup in 1977–78 and 2 UEFA Super Cups in 1976 and 1978
Tomislav Ivić	Yugoslavia	1980–82	94	1 First Division title in 1980–81
Paul Van Himst	Belgium	1982–85	155	1 First Division title in 1984–85, 1 Belgian Supercup in 1985 and 1 UEFA Cup in 1982–83
Martin Lippens	Belgium	1985–86 and 1988–89	69	2 Cups in 1987–88 and 1988–89
Jean Dockx	Belgium	1985–86, 1995, 1997 and 1998–99	36	
Arie Haan	Netherlands	1986–87 and Dec 1997–Sept 98	100	2 First Division titles in 1985–86 and 1986–87
Georges Leekens	Belgium	1987–88	32	1 Belgian Supercup in 1987
Aad de Mos	Netherlands	1989–92	141	1 First Division title in 1990–91
Luka Peruzović	Croatia	1992–93	26	
Johan Boskamp	Netherlands	1993–95; 1995–97	198	3 First Division titles in 1992–93, 1993–94 and 1994–95, 1 Cup in 1993–94 and 1 Belgian Supercup in 1993
Herbert Neumann	Germany	1995	4	
René Vandereycken	Belgium	July – December 1997	20	
Franky Vercauteren	Belgium	1998–1999; February 2005 – November 2007	156	2 First Division titles in 2005–06 and 2006–07 and 2 Belgian Supercups in 2006 and 2007
Aimé Anthuenis	Belgium	1999 – July 2002	141	2 First Division titles in 1999–00 and 2000–01 and 2 Belgian Supercups in 2000 and 2001
Hugo Broos	Belgium	July 2002 – February 2005	126	1 First Division title in 2003–04
Ariel Jacobs	Belgium	November 2007 – May 2012	175	2 First Division titles in 2009–10 and 2011–12, 1 Cup title in 2007–08 and 1 Belgian Supercup in 2010
John van den Brom	Netherlands	July 2012 – March 2014	98	1 First Division title in 2012-13
Besnik Hasi	Kosovo; Albania	March 2014 – May 2016	119	1 First Division title in 2013-14 and 1 Belgian Supercup in 2014
René Weiler	Switzerland	July 2016 – September 2017	66	1 First Division title in 2016-17 and 1 Belgian Supercup in 2017
Hein Vanhaezebrouck	Belgium	October 2017 – December 2018	62	
Fred Rutten	Netherlands	January – April 2019	13	
Karim Belhocine	France	April – July 2019	6	
Vincent Kompany	Belgium	July – August 2019	4	
Simon Davies	Wales	August – October 2019	9	
Franky Vercauteren	Belgium	October 2019 – July 2020	13	
Vincent Kompany	Belgium	August 2020 – June 2022	88	
Felice Mazzù	Belgium	June 2022 – October 2022	22	
Brian Riemer	Denmark	December 2022 – September 2024	76	
David Hubert	Belgium	September 2024 – March 2025	38	
Besnik Hasi	Albania	March 2025 – 1 February 2026	43	
Edward Still (interim)	Belgium; England	1–9 February 2026	2	
Jérémy Taravel (interim)	France	9 February 2026 – 23 June 2026	0	
Vítor Bruno	Portugal	23 June 2026 –	0	
