= Joseph Vliers =

Belgian footballer

Jef Vliers
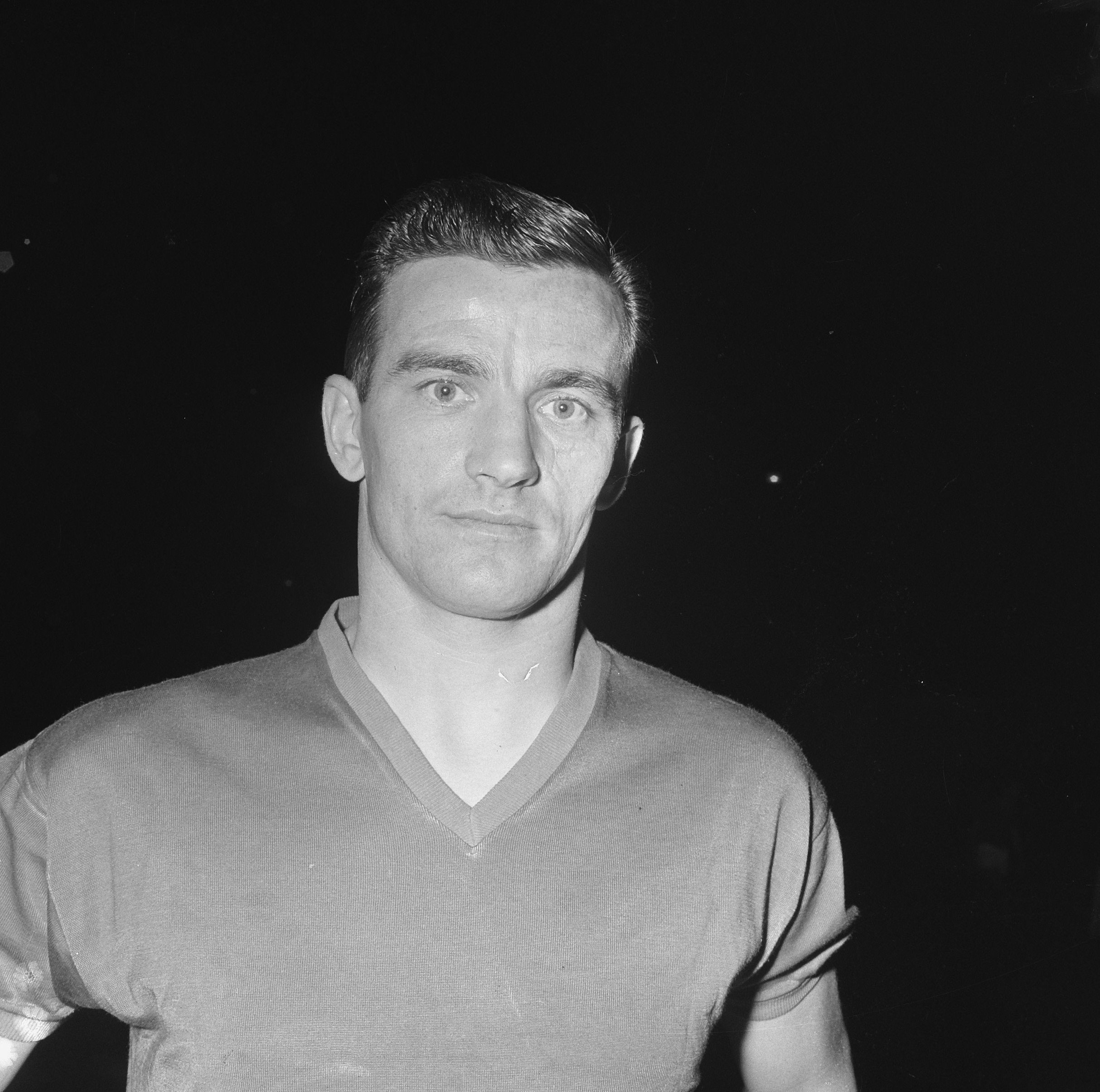
- Vliers with Standard de Liège in 1965

Personal information
- Full name: Joseph Jean Vliers
- Date of birth: 18 December 1932
- Place of birth: Tongeren, Belgium
- Date of death: 19 January 1994 (aged 61)
- Height: 1.86 m (6 ft 1 in)
- Position: Striker

Senior career*
| Years | Team | Apps | (Gls) |
| 1951–1954 | K.S.K. Tongeren | 138 | (104) |
| 1954–1956 | RC Brussels | 28 | (10) |
| 1956–1959 | K. Beerschot V.A.C. | 90 | (44) |
| 1959–1966 | Standard de Liège | 186 | (23) |
| Total | | 439 | (181) |

International career
| 1955–1963 | Belgium | 6 | (0) |

Managerial career
- 1967–1969: Racing White
- 1969–1970: Beerschot
- 1972–1974: Beringen
- 1976–1977: Royal Antwerp
- 1978–1979: Waterschei Thor
- 1979: 1. FC Nürnberg
- 1981–1983: Tongeren
- 1983–1984: Beringen
- 1984: Luxembourg
- 1988: Standard de Liège
- 1988–1989: Genk
- * Club domestic league appearances and goals

Joseph Vliers (18 December 1932 in Tongeren – 19 January 1994 in Tongeren), (mostly called Jef Vliers), was a Belgian football player who finished top scorer of the Belgian First Division with 25 goals and in 1958 while playing for Beerschot. He formerly played with Patria Tongeren and then with Racing de Bruxelles. In the summer of 1955, he moved to Beerschot and he eventually played with Standard Liège. Vliers played six times with the Belgium national team between 1955 and 1963. He made his international debut on 3 April 1955 in a 1–0 friendly defeat to the Netherlands. He was in the team for the 1954 FIFA World Cup but he did not play.

== Honours ==
=== Club ===
==== Standard Liège ====
- Belgian First Division champions: 1960-61, 1962-63
- Belgian First Division runners-up: 1961-62, 1964-65

=== Individual ===
- Belgian First Division top scorer: 1957–58 (35 goals)
