= List of Belgian Pro League clubs =

The following is a list of clubs who have played in the Belgian First Division since its creation in 1895. Teams in bold currently compete in the 2026-27 season. Teams in italics are no longer active, due to dissolution, bankruptcy or merger.

Club	Town or City	Sea-sons	Debut season	Last Promotion	Last Relegation	Best finish	2025–26
**Standard Liège**	Liège	108	1909–10	1920-21	1913-14	1st	8th
**Club Brugge**	Bruges	105	1895–96	1958-59	1950-51	1st	1st
**Antwerp**	Antwerp	103	1895–96	2016-17	2003-04	1st	11th
**Anderlecht**	Anderlecht	96	1921–22	1934-35	1930-31	1st	4th
**Cercle Brugge**	Bruges	88	1899–1900	2017–18	2014-15	1st	14th
**KAA Gent**	Ghent	88	1913–14	1988-89	1987-88	1st	5th
Beerschot VAV	Antwerp	81	1900–01	1981-82	1990-91	1st	— Defunct (1999)
**Mechelen**	Mechelen	76	1921–22	2018–19	2017–18	1st	6th
Lierse SK	Lier	75	1927–28	2009-10	2014-15	1st	— Defunct (2018)
RFC Liége	Liège	67	1895–96	1944-45	1994-95	1st	Tier 2 4th
**Union SG**	Forest	64	1901–02	2020-21	1972-73	1st	2nd
**Charleroi SC**	Charleroi	62	1947–48	2011-12	2010-11	2nd	9th
**Sint-Truiden**	Sint-Truiden	50	1957–58	2014-15	2011-12	2nd	3rd
Daring Club de Bruxelles	Molenbeek-Saint-Jean	48	1903–04	1958-59	1968-69	1st	— Merged into RWD Molenbeek (1973)
**Genk**	Genk	45	1974–75 (as KFC Winterslag)	1995-96	1993-94	1st	7th
Racing White Daring Molenbeek	Molenbeek-Saint-Jean	43	1924–25 (as White Star Woluwe)	2000-01	2001-02	1st	— Merged into FC Molenbeek Brussels Strombeek (2003)
Lokeren Oost-Vlaanderen	Lokeren	42	1974–75	1995-96	2018-19	2nd	— Merged into Lokeren-Temse (2020)
Berchem Sport	Antwerp	41	1922–23	1985-86	1986-87	2nd	Tier 4 15th
Racing Bruxelles	Uccle	40	1895–96	1953-54	1954-55	1st	— Merged into Royal Racing White (1963)
**Kortrijk**	Kortrijk	39	1906–07	2025–26	2024–25	5th	Tier 2 2nd
KSK Beveren	Beveren	37	1967–68	1996-97	2006-07	1st	Tier 6 6th
KRC Mechelen	Mechelen	32	1910–11	1987-88	1989-90	2nd	Tier 4 9th
KSV Waregem	Waregem	28	1966–67	1994-95	1995-96	4th	— Merged into SV Zulte Waregem (2001)
Beringen FC	Beringen	25	1950–51	1982-83	1983-84	2nd	— Merged into KVK Beringen (2002)
Germinal Beerschot	Antwerp	24	1989–90	1988-89	2012-13	3rd	— Defunct (2013)
Olympic Charleroi	Charleroi	24	1937–38	1973-74	1974-75	2nd	Tier 2 17th
**Westerlo**	Westerlo	23	1997–98	2021–22	2016–17	6th	10th
Tilleur	Saint-Nicolas	21	1925–26	1963-64	1966-67	4th	— Merged into R. Tilleur FC Liege (1995)
KRC Gent	Ghent	20	1899–1900	1951-52	1952-53	5th	Tier 4 14th
RCS Verviétois	Verviers	20	1900–01	1955-56	1960-61	4th	— Defunct (2015)
**Zulte Waregem**	Waregem	20	2005–06	2023–24	2022-23	2nd	13th
Léopold Club	Uccle	18	1895–96	1912-13	1913-14	2nd	Tier 6 1st
Eendracht Aalst	Aalst	16	1941–42	1993-94	2001-02	4th	— Defunct (2025)
Waterschei Thor	Genk	15	1954–55	1977-78	1985-86	3rd	— Merged into KRC Genk (1988)
RE Mouscron	Mouscron	14	1996–97	1995-96	2009-10	3rd	— Defunct (2010)
KV Oostende	Ostend	14	1993–94	2012-13	2022–23	7th	— Defunct (2024)
Lyra	Lier	12	1932–33	1952-53	1953-54	6th	— Merged into K. Lierse SV (1972)
**OH Leuven**	Leuven	11	2011–12	2019-20	2015-16	11th	12th
**SK Beveren**	Beveren	10	2012–13 (as Waasland-Beveren)	2025–26	2020-21	12th	Tier 2 1st
KFC Lommel SK	Lommel	10	1992–93	2000-01	2002-03	5th	— Merged into KVSK United Overpelt-Lommel (2003)
RAEC Mons	Mons	9	2002–03	2010-11	2013-14	9th	— Defunct (2015)
Athletic and Running Club	Brussels	9	1896–67	1895-96	1904-05	3rd	— Defunct (1909)
Boom FC	Boom	9	1938–39	1991-92	1992-93	7th	— Merged into Rupel Boom FC (1998)
Diest	Diest	9	1961–62	1969-70	1974-75	7th	– Defunct (2025)
KAS Eupen	Eupen	9	2010–11	2015-16	2010-11	12th	Tier 2 7th
RAA Louviéroise	La Louvière	9	1975–76	1999-2000	2005-06	7th	— Merged into Football Couillet La Louviere (2009)
Sérésien	Seraing	8	1982–83	1992-93	1995-96	3rd	— Merged into Standard Liège (1996)
Royal Excel Mouscron	Mouscron	7	2014–15 (as R. Mouscron-Peruwelz)	2013-14	2020-21	13th	— Defunct (2022)
KRC Harelbeke	Harelbeke	6	1995–96	1994-95	2000-01	5th	— Defunct (2002)
Excelsior Bruxelles	Forest	5	1908–09	1907-08	1912-13	7th	— Defunct (1935)
La Forestoise	Forest	5	1926–27	1941-42	1946-47	10th	— Merged into Royal Leopold (1996)
KSV Roeselare	Roeselare	5	2005–06	2004-05	2009-10	11th	— Defunct (2020)
Crossing Schaerbeek	Schaerbeek	4	1969–70	1968-69	1972-73	12th	Tier 5 12th
FCV Dender EH	Dendermonde	4	2007–08	2023–24	2025–26	12th	16th
FC Molenbeek; Brussels Strombeek	Molenbeek-Saint-Jean	4	2004–05	2003-04	2007-08	10th	— Defunct (2014)
AS Oostende	Ostend	4	1969–70	1973-74	1976-77	12th	— Merged into KV Oostende (1981)
Uccle Sport	Uccle	4	1919–20	1946-47	1947-48	10th	— Merged into Royal Uccle Léopold (1990)
Beerschot VA	Antwerp	3	2020–21	2019-20	2024–25	9th	Tier 2 3rd
Racing Jet de Bruxelles	Jette	3	1984–85	1985-86	1987-88	12th	— Defunct (2020)
Sint-Niklase SK	Sint-Niklaas	3	1945–46	1983–84	1984-85	6th	— Merged into Sporting Lokeren (2000)
Skill FC	Brussels	3	1899–00	1898-99	1901-02	5th	— Defunct (1902)
Turnhout	Turnhout	3	1931–32	1962-63	1963-64	13th	Tier 5 11th
Belgica FC Edegem	Edegem	2	1933–34	1932-33	1934-35	12th	— Defunct (2016)
**RAAL La Louvière**	La Louvière	2	2025–26	2024–25	N/A	15th	15th
Sporting Club de Bruxelles	Ixelles	2	1895–96	1895-96	1896-97	3rd	— Defunct (1897)
Seraing	Seraing	2	2021–22	2020–21	2022–23	17th	Tier 2 11th
Tongeren	Tongeren	2	1981–82	1980-81	1982-83	10th	Tier 4 11th
Tubantia	Antwerp	2	1930–31	1929-30	1931-32	11th	Tier 8 16th
AC Gantois	Ghent	1	1898–99	1897–98	N/A	3rd	— Merged into RC Gent (1899)
FC Courtraisien	Kortrijk	1	1899–00	1898–99	1899–00	4th	— Merged into Kortrijk Sport (1918)
Heusden-Zolder	Heusden-Zolder	1	2003–04	2002-03	2003-04	17th	— Defunct (2006)
**Lommel SK**	Lommel	1	2026–27	2025–26	N/A	N/A	Tier 2 5th
RFC Montegnée	Saint-Nicolas	1	1930–31	1929-30	1930-31	13th	— Defunct (2014)
Olympia	Brussels	1	1903–04	1902-03	1903-04	5th	— Defunct (1909)
Oostendensche FC	Ostend	1	1898–99	1897–98	1898–99	2nd	— unknown
Patro Eisden	Maasmechelen	1	1960–61	1959-60	1960-61	16th	Tier 2 6th
Racing Club Tournaisien	Tournai	1	1958–59	1957-58	1958-59	15th	— Merged into RFC Tournai (2002)
RWDM Brussels	Molenbeek-Saint-Jean	1	2023–24	2022–23	2023–24	15th	Tier 2 13th
Sport Pédestre de Gand	Ghent	1	1898–99	1897–98	N/A	4th	— Merged into RC Gent (1899)
SC Hasselt	Hasselt	1	1979–80	1978-79	1979-80	18th	— Merged into KSK Kermt-Hasselt (2001)
Stade Louvaniste	Leuven	1	1949–50	1948-49	1949-50	16th	— Merged into OH Leuven (2002)
Tirlemont	Tienen	1	1937–38	1936-37	1937-38	14th	Tier 3 9th
Tubize	Tubize	1	2008–09	2007-08	2008-09	17th	Tier 3 3rd
Union d'Ixelles	Ixelles	1	1895–96	1895-96	1895-96	7th	— Defunct (1901)
Union Tournaisienne	Tournai	1	1951–52	1950-51	1951-52	16th	— Defunct (2026)
Verbroedering Geel	Geel	1	1999–2000	1998-99	1999-2000	17th	— Defunct (2008)
