= Frank König =

Swiss footballer

Personal information
- Full name: Adolphus Franciscus König
- Date of birth: 7 May 1874
- Place of birth: Ghent, Belgium
- Date of death: 9 December 1959 (aged 85)
- Place of death: Brussels, Belgium
- Position: Forward

Senior career*
Years	Team	Apps	(Gls)
1895–1897	Sporting Club de Bruxelles		
1897–1900	Racing Club de Bruxelles		

Managerial career
- 1900: Belgium Olympic (1)
Medal record
Men's football
Representing Belgium
Bronze medal – third place	1900 Paris	Team competition
- * Club domestic league appearances and goals

Adolphus Franciscus "Frank" König (7 May 1874 – 9 December 1959) was a Belgian footballer who played as a forward for Belgian club Racing Club de Bruxelles. He was also a manager who coached the Belgian squad that participated in the football tournament at the 1900 Summer Olympics. He was also a referee who refereed the first game of the Netherlands national team. He was also a founding member of the Belgian Football Association in 1895. He was topscorer in the Belgian First Division in two back-to-back seasons in 1898 and 1899. Besides being an outstanding football player, he was also an outstanding athlete who also performed in other modalities, notably athletics.

== Biography ==
König was born in Ghent to Swiss parents, but moved to England as a child to study there. While in England, he was introduced to football and developed an interest in the growing sport. In 1895 he returned to Belgium and shortly after his arrival he was one of the founding members of the Belgian Football Association on 1 September 1895.

He then joined Sporting Club de Bruxelles, which participated in the very first edition of the Belgian Championship in 1895–96, and König helped his side to a 3rd place finish just behind Antwerp FC and champions F.C. Liégeois. The club withdrew during the next season and was dissolved, and most of the players, including him, decided to join Racing Club de Bruxelles in 1897. In his first season at Racing, König helped the club win the Belgian championship, and again in 1899–1900.

Besides football, he practiced several other sports such as boxing and rowing and athletics. He was a three-time Belgian champion in the 100m and four times quarter-mile champion. As a result, he was a very fast and dangerous player in football, being the top scorer in the Belgian Championship two successive times in 1898 and 1899.

König was a member of the Belgian squad who won a bronze medal in Paris, acting as coach of a team made up almost entirely of students of the University of Brussels. The team lost its only game at the tournament to Club Français by 6 goals to 2.

König refereed his first and last international match on 30 April 1905, a Low Countries derby between Belgium and the Netherlands in the 1905 Coupe Vanden Abeele, ending in a 4–1 win to the Dutch after extra-time, but more important than the result was its historic relevance since it was the Dutch's very first official game.

== Honours ==
=== Club ===
Racing Club de Bruxelles

- Belgian First Division:
  - Champions (2): 1896–97, 1899–1900

=== Individual ===
- Belgian First Division top scorer: 1897-98, 1898-99
