= Victor Wégria =

Belgian footballer (1936–2008)

- Wégria playing for Belgium in 1960

Personal information
- Full name: Victor Lucien Wégria
- Date of birth: 4 November 1936
- Place of birth: Villers-le-Bouillet, Belgium
- Date of death: 5 June 2008 (aged 71)
- Place of death: Liège, Belgium
- Height: 1.77 m (5 ft 10 in)
- Position: Striker

Senior career*
Years	Team	Apps	(Gls)
1955–1965	RFC Liège	245	(145)
1965–1966	Standard Liège	14	(7)
1966–1970	Racing Club Jette	40	(11)
1970–1973	Racing Jet Brussels		
Total		299	(162)

International career
1957–1961	Belgium	5	(2)

Managerial career
- 1971–1975: RFC Liège
- 1983: RFC Liège
- * Club domestic league appearances and goals

Victor Lucien Wégria (4 November 1936 – 5 June 2008) was a Belgian footballer who played as a striker.

He played mostly for RFC Liège, and later joined Standard Liège. Wégria finished four times top scorer of the Jupiler League (in 1959, 1960, 1961 and 1963). Only Erwin Vandenbergh managed to beat this record (he was six times top scorer of this competition).

Victor Wégria was capped five times by the Belgium national team. He died on 6 June 2008, aged 71.

== Honours ==
=== Player ===
Standard Liège

- Belgian Cup winners: 1965-66

==== Individual ====
- Belgian First Division top scorer: 1958–59 (26 goals), 1959-60 (21), 1960-61 (23), 1962-63 (29)

=== Manager ===
==== RFC Liège ====
- Belgian League Cup runners-up: 1973
