= René Vanderwilt =

Belgian footballer (1934–2022)

- Vanderwilt with Anderlecht in 1955

Personal information
- Date of birth: 23 May 1934
- Date of death: November 2022 (aged 88)
- Position: Midfielder

Senior career*
Years	Team	Apps	(Gls)
- SCUP Jette
1953–1960	Anderlecht		
1960–?	Charleroi		

International career
1956–1958	Belgium	3	(0)
- * Club domestic league appearances and goals

René Vanderwilt (23 May 1934 – November 2022) was a Belgian footballer who played as a midfielder. He made three appearances for the Belgium national team from 1956 to 1958.

== Career ==
Vanderwilt played for Anderlecht from 1953 to 1960, winning four domestic titles. He scored the club's first goal in an international competition in Anderlecht's 6–3 defeat to Hungarian side Voros Lobogo on 7 September 1955.

In 1960 Vanderwilt joined Charleroi.

== Death ==
In November 2022 his former club Anderlecht reported that he had died.

== Honours ==
Anderlecht

- Belgian First Division: 1953–54, 1954–55, 1955–56, 1958–59; runners-up: 1956–57, 1959–60
