= Stan Vanden Eynde =

Belgian footballer (1909–1994)

- Van den Eynde with Beerschot in 1937

Personal information
- Full name: Stanley Hubert Adolphus Vanden Eynde
- Date of birth: 3 October 1909
- Place of birth: Rotterdam, Netherlands
- Date of death: 18 November 1994 (aged 85)
- Place of death: Berchem, Belgium
- Position: Striker

Senior career*
Years	Team	Apps	(Gls)
1929–1939	Beerschot VAC	134	(48)

International career
1931–1938	Belgium	26	(9)
- * Club domestic league appearances and goals

Stanley Hubert Adolphus Vanden Eynde or Van den Eynde (3 October 1909 – 18 November 1994) was a Belgian international footballer who played as a striker for Beerschot VAC. Vanden Eynde also scored 9 goals in 26 appearances for the Belgium national side.

== Club career ==
Van den Eynde made his debut in 1929 as a striker in the first team at Beerschot VAC. He soon acquired a place as a starter there. Due to a serious injury, a broken leg, sustained in the 1934 FIFA World Cup qualification game Ireland–Belgium, he had to stay in Dublin for three months and was absent from the football fields from 25 February 1934 to 22 November 1936. With this he took the opportunity to travel for a year and a half to Australia and New Zealand. He became national champion twice with Beerschot in 1938 and 1939, playing in a team that included other Beerschot greats such as Raymond Braine and Arthur Ceuleers. The 1938–39 season was also his last season as a professional player. Van den Eynde played a total of 134 matches in the Belgian First Division, in which he scored 48 goals.

== International career ==
Between 1931 and 1938, Van den Eynde played 26 matches with the Belgium national football team, scoring a total of 9 goals. His international career was also interrupted between 1934 and 1937 by his serious injury in Dublin. In 1938, he returned to the national team.

== Personal life ==
His family was closely involved with Beerschot VAC. His brother John Van den Eynde also played for Beerschot. Their mother, Evelyn Goodman, came from London in England, while their father Henri Van den Eynde was a Belgian born in Antwerp. The family owned a cottage style villa on Della Faillelaan in Antwerp.

== Honours ==
Beerschot

- Belgian First Division: 1937–38, 1938–39
