= Maurice Vertongen =

Belgian footballer (1886–1968)

Personal information
- Date of birth: 7 May 1886
- Date of death: 27 March 1968 (aged 81)
- Position: Forward

Senior career*
Years	Team	Apps	(Gls)
1904–1905	Athletic and Running Club de Bruxelles		
1905–1909	Royal Racing Club de Bruxelles		
1909–1911	Union SG		

International career
1907–1911	Belgium	6	(1)
- * Club domestic league appearances and goals

Maurice Vertongen (7 May 1886 – 27 March 1968) was a Belgian footballer who played as a forward. Vertongen became 3 times topscorer in the Belgian first division while playing for Brussels based clubs Royal Racing Club de Bruxelles and Union Saint-Gilloise. He made six appearances for the Belgium national football team from 1907 to 1911.

== Honours ==
=== Individual ===
- Belgian First Division top scorer: 1906-07 (29 goals), 1907-08 (23 goals), 1909-10 (36 goals)
