= 1896–97 in Belgian football =

The 1896–97 season was the second competitive season in Belgian football.

== Overview ==
Only one official league existed at the time. It was called Coupe de Championnat (Championship Cup) and was disputed between 6 teams since only one new team was admitted whereas the last two of the previous championship were withdrawn.

== Honour ==
Competition	Winner
Championship Cup	Racing Club de Bruxelles

== League standings ==
Pos	Team	Pld	Won	Drw	Lst	GF	GA	Pts	GD	Notes
1	Racing Club de Bruxelles	10	8	2	0	40	10	18	+30	
2	F.C. Liégeois	10	6	2	2	16	13	14	+3	
3	Antwerp F.C.	10	6	1	3	22	10	13	-3	
4	Léopold Club de Bruxelles	10	4	0	6	9	28	8	-19	
5	Athletic and Running Club de Bruxelles	10	3	1	6	25	14	7	+11	
6	Sporting Club de Bruxelles	10	0	0	10	2	39	0	-37	Withdrew mid-season, remaining results awarded.
