= Jean-Paul Colonval =

Belgian footballer (1940–2024)

- Colonval for Tilleur F.C. in 1965

Personal information
- Date of birth: 2 February 1940
- Place of birth: Tirlemont, Belgium
- Date of death: 7 March 2024 (aged 84)
- Position: Striker

Senior career*
Years	Team	Apps	(Gls)
1959–1963	White Star Brussels		
1963–1964	Royal Racing White		
1964–1966	Tilleur		
1966–1967	Daring Club de Bruxelles		
1967–1969	Standard de Liège		
1969–1971	Daring Club Molenbeek		

Managerial career
- 1971–1975: Racing Jet de Bruxelles
- 1975–1976: Charleroi
- 1979–1982: Racing Jet de Bruxelles
- 1983: Víkingur
- 1984–1985: Racing Jet de Bruxelles
- * Club domestic league appearances and goals

Jean-Paul Colonval (2 February 1940 – 7 March 2024) was a Belgian footballer who finished top scorer of the Belgian First Division with 25 goals in 1965 while playing for Tilleur. He later played for R. Standard de Liège, but never for the Belgium national team. Colonval eventually played 114 games in the Belgian First Division and scored 64 goals.

Colonval was a technical director at R.A.E.C. Mons from 2006 to 2007. He was the technical advisor of FC Brussels president Johan Vermeersch. Colonval was the director of the "Football Study" section at the college of Bonne-Espérance.

Colonval also coached Racing Jet de Bruxelles, Charleroi and Víkingur.

Born on 2 February 1940, he died on 7 March 2024, at the age of 84.

== Honours ==
Standard Liège

- Belgian First Division: 1968–69

Individual

- Belgian First Division top scorer: 1964–65 (25 goals)
- Belgian Second Division top scorer: 1969–70 (19 goals)
