= Marius Mondelé =

Belgian footballer

Personal information
- Full name: Marius Fernand Mondelé
- Date of birth: 12 December 1913
- Place of birth: Molenbeek-Saint-Jean, Belgium
- Date of death: 7 February 1981 (aged 67)
- Place of death: Libramont-Chevigny, Belgium

Senior career*
Years	Team	Apps	(Gls)
1932-45	Daring de Bruxelles		
1945-50	Ixelles SC		
1951-55	CS Libramontois		

International career
1935–1936	Belgium	4	(0)
- * Club domestic league appearances and goals

Marius Mondelé (12 December 1913 – 7 February 1981) was a Belgian footballer. With Daring de Bruxelles, Mondelé became Belgian champion twice. He won also the Belgian cup with Daring in the 1934–35 season.

For Union, he would eventually score 114 goals in 154 First Division games, becoming twice topscorer in the Belgian First Division.

Mondelé played in four matches for the Belgium national football team from 1935 to 1936.

== Honours ==
Daring Club de Bruxelles

- Belgian First Division: 1935–36, 1936-37
- Belgian Cup: 1934–35

Individual

- Belgian First Division top scorer: 1934–35 (28 goals), 1937-38 (32 goals)
