= Guillaume Ulens =

Belgian footballer (1909–1970)

Personal information
- Full name: Guillaume Frans Gustaaf Ulens
- Date of birth: 11 July 1909
- Date of death: 10 November 1970 (aged 61)

Senior career*
Years	Team	Apps	(Gls)
1925-35	Antwerp	215	(181)

International career
1935	Belgium	1	(0)
- * Club domestic league appearances and goals

Guillaume Ulens (11 July 1909 – 10 November 1970) was a Belgian footballer who played as a striker. During 10 seasons with F.C. Antwerp, Ulens scored 209 goals, of which 181 in the Belgian Championship.

He played in one match for the Belgium national football team in 1935.

== Honours ==
=== Antwerp ===
- Belgian First Division: 1928–29, 1930–31

=== Individual ===
- Belgian First Division top scorer: 1932–33 (33 goals)
