= Charles Atkinson-Grimshaw =

English footballer

Personal information
- Full name: Charles Richard Atkinson-Grimshaw
- Date of birth: 17 December 1877
- Place of birth: Plymouth, Devon, England
- Date of death: 14 October 1933 (aged 55)
- Place of death: Florence, Italy

Senior career*
Years	Team	Apps	(Gls)
- Racing Club de Bruxelles
- * Club domestic league appearances and goals

Charles Richard Atkinson-Grimshaw (17 December 1877 – 14 October 1933) was an English footballer who played for Belgian club Racing Club de Bruxelles as a forward. He was topscorer in the Belgian First Division in the 1899–1900 season.

He was the son of Charles William Atkinson-Grimshaw, a retired soldier who died in Bruges in 1892, and Charlotte Honoria Louise Digby Wright. Atkinson-Grimshaw died in Florence, Italy, where he worked at the British Consulate.

== Honours ==
=== Club ===
Racing Club de Bruxelles

- Belgian First Division champions: 1899–1900, 1900–01

=== Individual ===
- Belgian First Division top scorer: 1899–1900
