= Albert Dehert =

Belgian footballer

Albert De Hert
- De Hert in 1953

Personal information
- Full name: Albert Lodewijk de Hert
- Date of birth: 18 November 1921
- Place of birth: Berchem, Belgium
- Date of death: 8 July 2013 (aged 91)
- Place of death: Antwerp, Belgium
- Position: Striker

Senior career*
Years	Team	Apps	(Gls)
1943–1944	Berchem Sport		
1945–1955	Berchem Sport		

International career
1949–1950	Belgium	10	(3)
- * Club domestic league appearances and goals

Albert Dehert (18 November 1921 – 8 July 2013) was a Belgian footballer who played as a striker.

== Football career ==
Throughout his whole career, "Bert" Dehert played for Berchem Sport, the club of his hometown. In the 1942-43 season, he became top scorer in the Belgian Second Division with 55 goals, which is still a record to this day. The team then also promoted to the Belgian First Division.

Dehert finished top scorer of the Belgian First Division with 27 goals in 1951 and would eventually score 127 times in 266 First Division games.

He also played 10 matches for the Belgium national team, scoring 3 goals.

== Culinary career ==
After retiring from professional football, Albert De Hert opened a sandwich bar named Quick on the De Coninckplein in Antwerp, which was then a vibrant nightlife area. It was at this location, in 1951, that he created the original Martino sandwich. Later, he took over Café Ciro's on the Amerikalei and transformed it into a respected restaurant, which he operated for 45 years until his retirement in 2008 at the age of 86.

== Honours ==
=== Club ===
==== Berchem Sport ====
- Belgian Second Division runners-up: 1942-43
- Belgian First Division runners-up: 1948-49, 1949-50, 1950-51

=== Individual ===
- Belgian Second Division top scorer: 1941-42 (41), 1942-43 (55)
- Belgian First Division top scorer: 1950–51 (27 goals)
