= Jozef Mannaerts =

Belgian footballer (1923–2012)

- Mannaerts for Racing Mechelen

Personal information
- Date of birth: 31 May 1923
- Place of birth: Geel, Belgium
- Date of death: 22 October 2012 (aged 89)
- Place of death: Bonheiden, Belgium
- Height: 1.65 m (5 ft 5 in)
- Positions: Midfielder; forward

Youth career
- K.F.C. Verbroedering Geel

Senior career*
Years	Team	Apps	(Gls)
1942–1946	Verbroedering Geel	24	(15)
1946–1958	Racing Mechelen	332	(243)
1958–1960	Merchtem-Brussegem	56	(26)
1960–1964	Rapide Wezemaal	?	(?)
1964–1965	FC Melsbroek	?	(?)

International career
1948	Belgium	1	(0)
- * Club domestic league appearances and goals

Jozef Mannaerts (31 May 1923 – 23 October 2012) was a Belgian international footballer who played as a striker.

Only in 2011, a year before he died, he was named Belgian topscorer for the 1951–52 season, after a supporter calculated via a statistical office that he had scored more goals then initial winner Rik Coppens.

== Honours ==
=== Club ===
Racing Mechelen

- Belgian Second Division: 1947-47
- Belgian First Division A runner-up: 1951–52
- Belgian Cup runner-up: 1953–54

=== Individual ===
- Belgian First Division top scorer: 1951–52 (25 goals)
