= 1983–84 Belgian First Division =

81st season of top-tier football in Belgium

Belgian First Division
- Season: 1983–84

Statistics of Belgian League in season 1983–84.

== Overview ==
Location of teams in Belgian First Division 1983–84

It was performed by 18 teams, and K.S.K. Beveren won the championship.

== League standings ==
Pos	Team	Pld	W	D	L	GF	GA	GD	Pts	Qualification or relegation
1	K.S.K. Beveren	34	22	7	5	59	33	+26	51	Qualified for 1984–85 European Cup
2	R.S.C. Anderlecht	34	20	7	7	80	39	+41	47	Qualified for 1984–85 UEFA Cup
3	Club Brugge K.V.	34	17	10	7	73	39	+34	44	Qualified for 1984–85 UEFA Cup
4	Standard Liège	34	17	6	11	55	44	+11	40	Qualified for 1984–85 UEFA Cup
5	RFC Sérésien	34	15	8	11	62	51	+11	38	
6	KV Mechelen	34	12	14	8	47	43	+4	38	
7	K.S.V. Waregem	34	13	9	12	50	44	+6	35	
8	Royal Antwerp FC	34	12	11	11	50	44	+6	35	
9	K. Waterschei S.V. Thor Genk	34	13	7	14	45	50	−5	33	
10	K.S.C. Lokeren Oost-Vlaanderen	34	12	7	15	43	50	−7	31	
11	Cercle Brugge K.S.V.	34	12	7	15	36	46	−10	31	
12	K.V. Kortrijk	34	10	9	15	34	45	−11	29	
13	R.F.C. de Liège	34	10	9	15	40	51	−11	29	
14	Lierse S.K.	34	10	9	15	41	58	−17	29	
15	K.A.A. Gent	34	10	8	16	37	43	−6	28	Qualified for 1984–85 European Cup Winners' Cup
16	K. Beerschot V.A.C.	34	7	12	15	43	69	−26	26	
17	R.W.D. Molenbeek	34	7	11	16	35	48	−13	25	Relegated to Division II
18	K. Beringen F.C.	34	8	7	19	32	65	−33	23	Relegated to Division II

== Results ==
Home \ Away	AND	ANT	BEE	BER	BEV	CER	CLU	GNT	KOR	FCL	LIE	LOK	MEC	MOL	SER	STA	WAR	WTG
Anderlecht		2–2	4–1	3–1	2–2	7–0	6–1	2–1	1–0	3–1	2–0	4–2	5–1	2–1	2–1	1–3	3–0	4–1
Antwerp	0–3		0–1	1–1	0–1	0–1	0–0	4–2	2–0	4–0	3–0	2–2	1–1	0–0	3–1	2–0	1–0	4–2
Beerschot	2–1	1–4		4–0	2–2	0–3	1–4	0–0	2–0	1–1	1–2	1–4	2–2	1–0	2–1	2–2	0–0	1–2
Beringen	0–1	0–3	3–2		2–0	0–1	0–3	3–1	1–0	1–1	2–1	1–2	0–0	3–1	2–0	1–3	0–0	1–0
Beveren	2–1	2–1	3–2	4–1		2–0	1–2	3–1	2–1	2–0	1–0	1–0	1–1	3–0	2–1	2–0	2–0	2–2
Cercle Brugge	2–1	2–2	2–2	3–1	0–1		0–5	1–1	3–1	1–0	1–2	0–0	2–0	2–0	2–2	2–3	1–0	0–1
Club Brugge	1–1	5–0	1–1	4–1	3–3	1–0		1–1	2–2	2–1	4–0	4–0	4–0	6–1	3–1	0–0	1–2	4–1
Gent	1–2	2–0	4–1	1–1	1–0	1–1	1–0		0–1	0–2	2–0	1–0	2–1	0–0	1–2	0–2	0–1	1–3
Kortrijk	2–1	0–0	1–1	1–0	1–1	2–1	0–1	0–3		4–0	0–0	0–3	1–1	2–1	0–2	2–0	2–2	3–2
Liège	2–2	1–3	1–1	3–0	2–3	1–1	3–1	1–4	2–0		0–0	4–2	0–1	0–0	0–1	1–0	0–2	0–1
Lierse	2–1	4–1	5–0	3–2	1–2	1–0	0–3	0–0	0–1	1–1		0–0	1–3	2–0	2–2	2–1	2–2	4–1
Lokeren	0–1	1–0	3–2	4–1	0–2	0–1	1–0	2–1	1–1	1–3	2–2		2–3	3–1	2–0	0–1	1–0	3–1
Mechelen	1–1	1–1	0–1	1–1	0–2	1–0	4–0	2–1	2–1	1–0	4–1	1–1		3–3	2–2	2–0	0–0	2–1
Molenbeek	0–2	0–0	0–0	2–0	2–0	0–1	1–2	0–0	2–2	1–2	4–0	2–0	1–3		2–0	3–0	2–3	0–0
Seraing	1–1	3–1	3–0	4–1	1–1	3–1	2–1	3–0	2–0	2–2	3–0	2–0	3–2	2–2		4–5	1–4	2–1
Standard Liège	2–3	2–1	5–1	2–0	2–1	2–0	2–2	1–0	0–3	0–2	0–0	1–1	0–0	3–0	2–1		5–3	3–0
Waregem	2–2	1–2	4–2	0–0	0–1	2–1	1–1	2–1	1–0	5–2	6–2	3–0	1–1	0–2	1–3	2–1		0–1
Waterschei Thor	1–0	2–2	2–2	3–1	1–2	1–0	1–1	1–2	3–0	0–1	3–1	3–0	1–0	1–1	1–1	0–2	1–0	

Legend: Blue = home team win; Yellow = draw; Red = away team win.

== Top scorers ==
Scorer	Goals	Team
(Belgium) Nico Claesen	27	Seraing
(Austria) Richard Niederbacher	24	KSV Waregem
(Belgium) Willy Wellens	21	Club Brugge
(Belgium) Erwin Vandenbergh	20	Anderlecht
(Belgium) Alexandre Czerniatynski	17	Anderlecht
(Denmark) Preben Elkjær	16	Lokeren
(Germany) Erwin Albert	16	Beveren
(Belgium) Eddy Voordeckers	15	Waterschei Thor
(Belgium) Jan Ceulemans	15	Club Brugge
(Netherlands) Roger Raeven	15	Molenbeek
(Belgium) Eddy Snelders	14	Lierse

== Attendances ==
#	Club	Average
1	Anderlecht	19,824
2	Club Brugge	14,471
3	Standard	14,324
4	Beveren	11,412
5	Gent	9,235
6	Antwerp	8,265
7	Waterschei	7,882
8	Liège	7,882
9	Mechelen	7,765
10	Waregem	7,559
11	Seraing	7,353
12	Beringen	6,941
13	Kortrijk	6,694
14	Lokeren	6,382
15	RWDM	6,294
16	Cercle	5,847
17	Beerschot	5,765
18	Lierse	5,647
