= 1896–97 Belgian First Division =

2nd season of top-tier football in Belgium

Belgian First Division
- Season: 1896–97

Statistics of Belgian First Division in the 1896–97 season.

== Overview ==
Location of teams in Belgian First Division 1896–97

It was contested by 6 teams, and Racing Club de Bruxelles won the championship.

== League standings ==
Pos	Team	Pld	W	D	L	GF	GA	GD	Pts	
1	Racing Club de Bruxelles	10	8	2	0	45	10	+35	18	
2	F.C. Liégeois	10	6	2	2	31	13	+18	14	
3	Antwerp F.C.	10	6	1	3	27	10	+17	13	
4	Léopold Club de Bruxelles	10	4	0	6	24	33	−9	8	
5	Athletic and Running Club de Bruxelles	10	3	1	6	25	24	+1	7	
6	Sporting Club de Bruxelles	10	0	0	10	2	64	−62	0	Withdrew mid-season, remaining results awarded.

== Results ==
Home \ Away	ANT	ARC	LÉO	RCB	SCB	FCL
Antwerp		0–0	8–0	1–4	6–1	2–0
Athletic Club Bruxelles	1–2		8–2	2–4	10–1	1–3
Léopold	3–1	5–0 (Note: Match awarded.)		1–3	5–0	3–4
Racing Bruxelles	1–0	2–1	5–0		18–0	3–3
Sporting CB	0–5	0–2	0–5	0–3		0–5
Liège	0–2	5–0	4–0	2–2	5–0	

Legend: Blue = home team win; Yellow = draw; Red = away team win.

== See also ==
- 1896–97 in Belgian football
