= Jules Van Craen =

Belgian footballer

- Van Craen in 1942

Personal information
- Date of birth: 3 September 1920
- Place of birth: Lint, Belgium
- Date of death: 15 October 1945 (aged 25)

Senior career*
Years	Team	Apps	(Gls)
1938-44	Lierse	108	(117)
July 1945	Anderlecht		

International career
1940	Belgium	2	(4)
- * Club domestic league appearances and goals

Jules Van Craen (3 September 1920 – 15 October 1945) was a Belgian footballer who played as a striker.

Together with Arthur Ceuleers, he became the Belgian First Division topscorer in 1943, with a (still standing) record of 41 goals. Ultimately, he would score 117 times for Lierse S.K. in 108 games in the First Division.

Jules Van Craen died on 10 October 1945 at the age of 25 due to a stomach tumor for which he was treated.

Van Craen played in two matches for the Belgium national football team in 1940, scoring four goals.

== Honours ==
=== Club ===
==== Lierse ====
- Belgian First Division champions: 1941-42

=== Individual ===
- Belgian First Division top scorer: 1942–43 (41 goals)
