= René Thirifays =

Belgian footballer

Personal information
- Date of birth: 8 October 1920
- Place of birth: Belgium
- Date of death: 17 October 1986 (aged 66)
- Place of death: Belgium
- Position: Striker

Senior career*
Years	Team	Apps	(Gls)
1945–1954	Charleroi		

International career
1946–1949	Belgium	13	(1)
- * Club domestic league appearances and goals

René Thirifays (8 October 1920–17 October 1986) was a Belgian football player who finished top scorer of the Belgian League with 26 goals in 1949 while playing for Sporting Charleroi. He played 13 times with the Belgium national team between 1946 and 1949. Thirifays made his international debut on 23 February 1946 in a 7–0 friendly win against Luxembourg.

== Honours ==
=== Club ===
==== Charleroi ====
- Belgian Second Division B champions: 1946-47

=== Individual ===
- Belgian First Division top scorer: 1948–49 (26 goals)
