= 1934–35 in Belgian football =

Football in Belgium
- Season: 1934–35

The 1934–35 season was the 35th season of competitive football in Belgium. RU Saint-Gilloise won their 11th and 3rd consecutive Premier Division title. The Belgian Cup was held for the first time since the 1926–27 and was won by Daring Club de Bruxelles SR, beating Lyra TSV in the final (3–2). The Belgium national football team played 5 friendly games.

== Overview ==
At the end of the season, RRC de Gand and Belgica FC Edegem were relegated to Division I, while RFC Brugeois (Division I A winner) and RSC Anderlechtois (Division I B winner) were promoted to the Premier Division.
SV Blankenberghe, RC Borgerhout, RFC Liégeois and Turnhoutsche SK Hand-in-Hand were relegated from Division I to Promotion, to be replaced by VG Ostende, FC Duffel, US Centre and Waterschei SV.

== National team ==
Date	Venue	Opponents	Score*	Comp	Belgium scorers
March 31, 1935	Olympic Stadium, Amsterdam (A)	The Netherlands	2-4	F	Joseph Van Beeck, Bernard Voorhoof
April 14, 1935	Heysel Stadium, Brussels (H)	France	1-1	F	Joseph Van Beeck
April 28, 1935	Heysel Stadium, Brussels (H)	Germany	1-6	F	Hendrik Isemborghs
May 12, 1935	Heysel Stadium, Brussels (H)	The Netherlands	0-2	F
May 30, 1935	Heysel Stadium, Brussels (H)	Switzerland	2-2	F	Minelli (o.g.), Joseph Van Beeck

* Belgium score given first

Key

- H = Home match
- A = Away match
- N = On neutral ground
- F = Friendly
- o.g. = own goal

== Honours ==
Competition	Winner
Premier Division	RU Saint-Gilloise
Cup	Daring Club de Bruxelles SR
Division I	RFC Brugeois and RSC Anderlechtois
Promotion	VG Ostende, FC Duffel, US Centre and Waterschei SV
