= Joseph Van Beeck =

Belgian footballer

Personal information
- Full name: Josephus Egidius Van Beeck
- Date of birth: 18 February 1911
- Date of death: 8 February 1998 (aged 86)

Senior career*
Years	Team	Apps	(Gls)
1927-37	Antwerp	167	(101)

International career
1930–1935	Belgium	16	(7)
- * Club domestic league appearances and goals

Joseph Van Beeck (18 February 1911 – 8 February 1998) was a Belgian footballer who played as a striker. During 9 seasons with F.C. Antwerp, he scored 120 goals, of which 101 in the Belgian Championship.

Van Beeck played in 16 matches for the Belgium national football team from 1930 to 1935, scoring seven goals.

== Honours ==
=== Antwerp ===
- Belgian First Division: 1928–29, 1930–31

=== Individual ===
- Belgian First Division top scorer: 1930–31 (21 goals)
