= Hippolyte Van den Bosch =

Belgian footballer (1926–2011)

Hypoliet van den Bosch

Personal information
- Full name: Hypoliet Geraard van den Bosch
- Date of birth: 30 April 1926
- Place of birth: Brussels, Belgium
- Date of death: 1 December 2011 (aged 85)
- Height: 1.73 m (5 ft 8 in)
- Position: Striker

Senior career*
Years	Team	Apps	(Gls)
1943–1958	Anderlecht		
1960–1961	Eendracht Aalst		

International career
1953–1957	Belgium	8	(2)

Managerial career
- 1972–1973: Anderlecht
- 1986–1989: Venezuela
- * Club domestic league appearances and goals

Hypoliet Geraard van den Bosch (30 April 1926 – 1 December 2011), nicknamed Poly, was a Belgian footballer who finished top scorer of the Belgian League in 1954 while playing for Anderlecht. He played eight times with the Belgium national team between 1953 and 1957. "Poly" made his international debut on 22 November 1953 in a 2–2 friendly draw against Switzerland and he scored twice. Van den Bosch was in the team for the 1954 FIFA World Cup.

== Honours ==
=== Player ===
Anderlecht

- Belgian First Division: 1953–54, 1954–55, 1955–56, 1958–59

Individual

- Belgian First Division top scorer: 1953–54 (29 goals)

=== Manager ===
Anderlecht

- Belgian Cup: 1972–73
- Belgian League Cup: 1973
