= Joseph Taeymans =

Belgian footballer (1899–1971)

- Taeymans for Berchem Sport

Personal information
- Date of birth: 27 January 1899
- Place of birth: Antwerp, Belgium
- Date of death: 14 June 1971 (aged 72)
- Height: 1.77 m (5 ft 10 in)
- Position: Forward

Senior career*
| Years | Team | Apps | (Gls) |
- K. Berchem Sport

International career
| 1925 | Belgium | 1 | (0) |
- * Club domestic league appearances and goals

Joseph Taeymans (27 January 1899 – 14 June 1971) was a Belgian footballer who played as a forward for K. Berchem Sport. He made one appearance for the Belgium national team in 1925.

== Honours ==
=== Individual ===
- Belgian First Division top scorer: 1924–25 (20 goals)
