= Arthur Ceuleers =

Belgian footballer

Personal information
- Full name: Arthur Albert Ceuleers
- Date of birth: 28 February 1916
- Place of birth: Antwerp, Belgium
- Date of death: 5 August 1998 (aged 82)
- Height: 1.77 m (5 ft 9 1/2 in)
- Position: Striker

Senior career*
Years	Team	Apps	(Gls)
1933–1944	Beerschot VAC		
1946–1951	Racing Club Bruxelles		

International career
1937–1938	Belgium	4	(2)
- * Club domestic league appearances and goals

Arthur Tuur Albert Ceuleers (28 February 1916 in Antwerp, Belgium – 5 August 1998) was a Belgian footballer. A striker for Beerschot VAC, he was twice Champion of Belgium in 1938 and 1939.

He was also a Belgian international in 1937 and 1938, 4 times. He was recalled ten years later, in 1948 for a match against France, but did not play. He continued his career after the war until 1951, with Racing Club Bruxelles.

He is the 4th highest scorer in the history of the Belgian First Division, with 280 goals in 401 matches.

== Honours ==
- International in 1937 and 1938 (4 caps and 2 goals)
- First international : Belgium-France, 3-1 21 February 1937 (one goal)
- Picked for the 1938 World Cup (did not play)
- Belgian Champion in 1937-38 and 1938-39 with Beerschot VAC
- Belgian First Division top scorer: 1942–43 (41 goals)
