= 1902–03 Belgian First Division =

8th season of top-tier football in Belgium

Belgian First Division
- Season: 1902–03

Statistics of Belgian First Division in the 1902–03 season.

== Overview ==
Location of teams in Belgian First Division 1902–03

It was contested by 10 teams, and Racing Club de Bruxelles won the championship.

== League standings ==
=== Championship Cup A ===
Pos	Team	Pld	W	D	L	GF	GA	GD	Pts	Qualification	BEE	LÉO	CSB	ANT	FCB
1	Beerschot	7	5	2	0	24	12	+12	12	Qualified for Final Group		2–4	5–0	3–2	1–0
2	Léopold	7	5	1	1	18	8	+10	11	Qualified for Final Group	1–1		3–1	2–2	4–0
3	CS Brugeois	7	2	0	5	9	21	−12	4		2–7	1–2		0–3	3–2
4	Antwerp	4	1	1	2	8	7	+1	3		– (Note: Match not played.)	2–2	–		1–2
5	FC Brugeois	7	1	0	6	7	18	−11	2		2–5	1–2	0–2	5–0 (Note: Scored as a goalless win in table.)	

=== Championship Cup B ===
Pos	Team	Pld	W	D	L	GF	GA	GD	Pts	Qualification	USG	RCB	ARC	FCL	VER
1	Union SG	8	7	0	1	40	13	+27	14	Qualified for Final Group		2–4	8–1	8–3	6–1
2	Racing Bruxelles	8	6	0	2	25	7	+18	12	Qualified for Final Group	0–2		3–1	4–0	5–0 (Note: Scored as a goalless win in table.)
3	Athletic Club Bruxelles	7	3	0	4	20	26	−6	6		2–5	0–6		– (Note: Match not played.)	6–1
4	Liége	7	3	0	4	16	25	−9	6		2–4	2–1	0–5 (Note: 3–0 to a 0–5 for Athletic because of a rule violation.)		4–3
5	Verviers	8	0	0	8	7	37	−30	0	(Note: Merged with Stade Wallon de Verviers to become C.S. Verviétois.)	5–0	0–2	1–6	1–3	

=== Final round ===
Pos	Team	Pld	W	D	L	GF	GA	GD	Pts	RCB	USG	BEE	LÉO
1	Racing Bruxelles	6	5	1	0	12	4	+8	11		2–1	1–1	5–0
2	Union SG	6	3	0	3	6	8	−2	6	1–3		2–1	2–1
3	Beerschot	6	2	2	2	5	8	−3	6	1–5	2–1		5–0
4	Léopold	6	0	1	5	2	5	−3	1	0–1	0–1	1–1	

== See also ==
- 1902–03 in Belgian football
