= 1951–52 Belgian First Division =

49th season of top-tier football in Belgium

Belgian First Division
- Season: 1951–52

Statistics of Belgian First Division in the 1951–52 season.

== Overview ==
Location of teams in Belgian First Division 1951–52

It was contested by 16 teams, and R.F.C. de Liège won the championship.
As part of the re-organisation of Belgian football for the following season, this division was renamed Division I.

== League standings ==
| Pos | Team | Pld | W | D | L | GF | GA | GD | Pts | Relegation |
|---|---|---|---|---|---|---|---|---|---|---|
| 1 | R.F.C. de Liège | 30 | 20 | 4 | 6 | 71 | 40 | +31 | 44 | |
| 2 | K.R.C. Mechelen | 30 | 16 | 8 | 6 | 77 | 41 | +36 | 40 | |
| 3 | Royal Antwerp FC | 30 | 18 | 4 | 8 | 66 | 43 | +23 | 40 | |
| 4 | Royale Union Saint-Gilloise | 30 | 15 | 8 | 7 | 61 | 48 | +13 | 38 | |
| 5 | KV Mechelen | 30 | 14 | 7 | 9 | 63 | 54 | +9 | 35 | |
| 6 | R.S.C. Anderlecht | 30 | 14 | 5 | 11 | 71 | 47 | +24 | 33 | |
| 7 | K.A.A. Gent | 30 | 13 | 6 | 11 | 56 | 57 | −1 | 32 | |
| 8 | R.O.C. de Charleroi-Marchienne | 30 | 10 | 11 | 9 | 47 | 48 | −1 | 31 | |
| 9 | Tilleur FC | 30 | 10 | 9 | 11 | 42 | 46 | −4 | 29 | |
| 10 | K Berchem Sport | 30 | 11 | 6 | 13 | 57 | 61 | −4 | 28 | |
| 11 | Daring Club | 30 | 9 | 8 | 13 | 44 | 50 | −6 | 26 | |
| 12 | Beerschot | 30 | 10 | 6 | 14 | 67 | 54 | +13 | 26 | |
| 13 | Standard Liège | 30 | 7 | 9 | 14 | 47 | 57 | −10 | 23 | |
| 14 | R. Charleroi S.C. | 30 | 7 | 8 | 15 | 43 | 65 | −22 | 22 | |
| 15 | R.R.C. Bruxelles | 30 | 7 | 7 | 16 | 36 | 61 | −25 | 21 | Relegated to Division II |
| 16 | R.U.S. Tournai | 30 | 3 | 6 | 21 | 25 | 101 | −76 | 12 | Relegated to Division II |

== Results ==
| Home \ Away | AND | ANT | BEE | BRC | RCB | CHA | DAR | GNT | FCL | KVM | OLY | RCM | STA | USG | TIL | TOU |
|---|---|---|---|---|---|---|---|---|---|---|---|---|---|---|---|---|
| Anderlecht | | 3–3 | 4–2 | 1–2 | 6–1 | 0–1 | 3–1 | 2–0 | 4–1 | 3–1 | 1–1 | 3–1 | 1–1 | 0–1 | 2–3 | 9–0 |
| Antwerp | 0–2 | | 1–1 | 2–1 | 2–1 | 2–0 | 2–1 | 2–1 | 4–1 | 1–1 | 4–3 | 3–0 | 3–0 | 2–1 | 3–0 | 8–0 |
| Beerschot | 1–3 | 2–5 | | 1–2 | 2–0 | 1–0 | 2–5 | 5–1 | 0–2 | 1–1 | 7–0 | 2–2 | 0–2 | 5–3 | 0–1 | 10–0 |
| Berchem | 1–0 | 0–2 | 5–1 | | 0–1 | 1–3 | 2–0 | 1–5 | 0–2 | 8–2 | 0–9 | 4–4 | 3–5 | 2–3 | 1–1 | 4–1 |
| Racing Bruxelles | 0–3 | 2–0 | 2–1 | 2–2 | | 1–4 | 1–5 | 0–1 | 0–1 | 0–0 | 3–3 | 2–2 | 1–3 | 3–4 | 2–1 | 1–3 |
| Charleroi | 2–1 | 0–0 | 2–2 | 1–2 | 3–1 | | 1–2 | 1–2 | 1–3 | 6–3 | 1–3 | 2–2 | 5–0 | 0–6 | 1–1 | 2–2 |
| Daring Club | 1–1 | 0–6 | 3–2 | 0–0 | 1–1 | 0–0 | | 5–2 | 1–2 | 1–3 | 0–0 | 0–1 | 0–1 | 2–2 | 1–1 | 4–0 |
| La Gantoise | 2–1 | 4–1 | 0–5 | 2–2 | 3–2 | 4–0 | 2–0 | | 1–4 | 0–2 | 4–0 | 2–2 | 1–0 | 0–2 | 0–0 | 3–1 |
| Liège | 4–1 | 7–1 | 1–1 | 2–3 | 2–0 | 3–0 | 3–1 | 4–3 | | 2–3 | 0–0 | 2–0 | 2–2 | 4–0 | 2–1 | 4–0 |
| KV Mechelen | 3–0 | 1–2 | 2–1 | 2–2 | 3–1 | 6–0 | 2–0 | 4–2 | 3–5 | | 2–1 | 1–1 | 3–2 | 0–2 | 4–2 | 3–0 |
| Olympic Charleroi | 3–3 | 1–0 | 0–3 | 1–0 | 0–1 | 2–1 | 5–3 | 1–1 | 0–2 | 1–0 | | 2–0 | 1–1 | 1–1 | 1–2 | 1–1 |
| K.R.C. Mechelen | 4–1 | 2–0 | 3–0 | 2–1 | 2–2 | 5–0 | 0–2 | 4–0 | 4–0 | 5–3 | 3–0 | | 1–1 | 4–2 | 4–1 | 5–0 |
| Standard Liège | 2–3 | 1–3 | 1–1 | 1–3 | 1–2 | 3–3 | 3–0 | 2–2 | 0–3 | 2–3 | 1–2 | 0–5 | | 1–2 | 3–1 | 6–0 |
| Union SG | 2–0 | 3–0 | 0–3 | 2–1 | 2–1 | 2–2 | 1–1 | 1–4 | 1–1 | 2–1 | 1–1 | 3–1 | 1–1 | | 4–0 | 3–1 |
| Tilleur | 2–4 | 1–0 | 3–1 | 1–0 | 1–1 | 3–1 | 1–2 | 1–2 | 5–1 | 1–1 | 2–2 | 1–2 | 0–0 | 3–1 | | 0–0 |
| Tournai | 1–6 | 3–4 | 0–4 | 2–4 | 0–1 | 2–0 | 0–2 | 2–2 | 0–1 | 0–0 | 0–2 | 1–6 | 2–1 | 3–3 | 0–2 | |

Legend: Blue = home team win; Yellow = draw; Red = away team win.
