= 1959–60 Belgian First Division =

57th season of top-tier football in Belgium

Belgian First Division
- Season: 1959–60

Statistics of Belgian First Division in the 1959–60 season.

== Overview ==
Location of teams in Belgian First Division 1959–60

It was contested by 16 teams, and Lierse S.K. won the championship.

== League standings ==
Pos	Team	Pld	W	D	L	GF	GA	GD	Pts	Qualification or relegation
1	Lierse (C)	30	16	6	8	57	40	+17	38	1960–61 European Cup
2	Anderlecht	30	16	5	9	69	42	+27	37	
3	Waterschei	30	13	9	8	52	39	+13	35	
4	Beerschot VAC	30	15	4	11	65	46	+19	34	
5	RFC Liège	30	10	12	8	43	35	+8	32	
6	Union Saint-Gilloise	30	11	10	9	58	56	+2	32	1960–61 Inter-Cities Fairs Cup
7	Standard Liège	30	12	8	10	54	48	+6	32	
8	Antwerp	30	13	6	11	60	50	+10	32	
9	La Gantoise	30	12	6	12	48	46	+2	30	
10	ROC Charleroi	30	12	5	13	38	48	−10	29	
11	Daring Club Bruxelles	30	10	7	13	37	44	−7	27	
12	Sint-Truiden	30	10	7	13	39	51	−12	27	
13	Club Brugge	30	10	6	14	37	53	−16	26	
14	Verviers	30	8	9	13	25	37	−12	25	
15	Berchem Sport (R)	30	9	7	14	36	56	−20	25	1960–61 Division II
16	Beringen FC (R)	30	7	5	18	35	62	−27	19	1960–61 Division II

Source: rsssf.com
Rules for classification: 1) points; 2) goal difference; 3) number of goals scored.
(C) Champions; (R) Relegated

== Results ==
Home \ Away	AND	ANT	BEE	BRC	BER	CLU	DAR	GNT	FCL	LIE	OLY	STA	STV	USG	VER	WTG
Anderlecht		3–2	1–2	5–1	2–1	5–2	2–1	4–0	1–3	4–1	6–2	4–0	1–3	2–2	0–0	4–1
Antwerp	1–3		1–0	8–1	5–2	5–1	4–1	4–0	0–0	1–2	0–2	1–1	2–1	2–2	3–1	3–1
Beerschot	0–3	3–1		3–1	2–1	9–1	6–2	5–2	1–2	5–1	2–1	3–2	0–0	3–4	2–0	3–3
Berchem	0–3	0–1	1–1		1–0	1–0	2–1	1–2	2–0	0–4	2–0	0–2	4–2	1–1	3–2	2–1
Beringen	1–5	1–3	1–0	1–0		2–1	1–0	2–1	1–3	0–2	0–0	1–2	1–1	2–3	2–1	1–2
Club Brugge	1–0	2–3	1–4	1–0	4–0		2–2	2–2	1–3	0–1	2–0	0–2	3–2	4–3	1–0	1–0
Daring Club	1–0	3–0	2–1	2–2	3–0	1–1		1–1	2–1	0–2	0–0	0–1	0–1	2–1	1–1	1–2
La Gantoise	0–2	1–0	1–2	4–1	3–0	0–0	1–2		0–0	4–0	3–0	1–0	0–1	4–0	0–0	1–2
Liège	2–2	2–1	2–2	1–1	3–3	0–1	1–2	0–1		4–0	2–1	4–1	2–2	0–0	0–0	1–1
Lierse	2–0	3–3	2–3	2–1	2–2	0–0	3–0	2–2	3–0		2–0	2–2	5–0	2–0	4–0	3–1
Olympic Charleroi	2–4	6–0	1–0	1–1	1–3	0–1	2–0	2–1	1–0	1–0		3–2	2–3	2–1	2–1	4–1
Standard Liège	1–1	4–0	1–0	2–2	2–2	1–0	0–0	4–6	0–1	2–3	3–0		2–1	6–3	2–0	2–2
Sint-Truiden	1–1	2–0	2–0	1–2	2–1	2–1	1–2	1–2	2–2	0–2	0–0	2–6		1–0	2–0	1–2
Union SG	4–1	1–1	1–3	2–1	5–3	3–2	2–1	5–2	3–2	2–2	1–1	3–1	3–1		0–0	2–2
Verviers	1–0	0–4	2–0	2–1	1–0	1–0	1–4	2–0	0–0	2–0	0–1	3–0	1–1	1–1		1–1
Waterschei Thor	4–0	1–1	3–0	1–1	2–0	1–1	2–0	1–3	0–2	1–0	7–0	0–0	4–0	1–0	2–1	

Legend: Blue = home team win; Yellow = draw; Red = away team win.
