= 1899–1900 Belgian First Division =

5th season of top-tier football in Belgium

Belgian First Division
- Season: 1899–1900

Statistics of Belgian First Division in the 1899–1900 season.

== Overview ==
Location of teams in Belgian First Division 1899–1900

It was contested by 10 teams, and Racing Club de Bruxelles won the championship.

== League standings ==
=== Championship Group A ===
Pos	Team	Pld	W	D	L	GF	GA	GD	Pts	Qualification	RCB	ANT	ARC	FCL	LÉO	SKI
1	Racing Bruxelles	10	7	0	3	28	12	+16	14	Play-off to decide Group winner		4–0	5–0	5–0 (Note: Match awarded.)	5–0	10–1
2	Antwerp	10	6	2	2	15	14	+1	14	Play-off to decide Group winner	5–0		1–3	5–3	5–0	5–0 (Note: The match between Antwerpen and Skill (originally finished 1–2) was rated as a 5–0 win for home team.)
3	Athletic Club Bruxelles	10	5	2	3	12	14	−2	12		4–1	2–2		1–2	0–0	5–0
4	Liége	10	5	1	4	14	20	−6	11		0–1	1–1	3–2		4–2	5–0
5	Léopold	10	4	1	5	18	16	+2	9		3–2	1–3	0–5	6–0		3–1
6	Skill Bruxelles	10	0	0	10	3	16	−13	0		0–5	0–5	0–5 (Note: The match between Skill and Athletic Club (originally finished 1–1) was rated as a 0–5 win for away team.)	1–3	0–5	

==== Play-off ====
Team 1	Score	Team 2
Racing Bruxelles	1–0	Antwerp

Racing Club de Bruxelles qualified for the national final.

=== Championship Group B ===
Only the rankings are known.

Pos	Team	Pld	W	D	L	GF	GA	GD	Pts	Qualification
1	FC Brugeois	0	?	?	?	?	?	—	0	Qualified for play-off final
2	CS Brugeois	0	0	0	0	0	0	0	0	
3	Racing Gand	0	?	?	?	?	?	—	0	
4	Courtraisien	0	?	?	?	?	?	—	0	

=== Final ===
Team 1	Agg.	Team 2	1st leg	2nd leg
Racing Bruxelles	11–1	FC Brugeois	3–0	8–1

== See also ==
- 1899–1900 in Belgian football
