= 1936–37 Belgian First Division =

37th season of top-tier football in Belgium

Belgian First Division
- Season: 1936–37

Statistics of Belgian First Division in the 1936–37 season.

== Overview ==
Location of teams in Belgian First Division 1936–37

It was contested by 14 teams, and Daring Club won the championship.

== League standings ==
| Pos | Team | Pld | W | D | L | GF | GA | GD | Pts | Relegation |
|---|---|---|---|---|---|---|---|---|---|---|
| 1 | Daring Club | 26 | 17 | 5 | 4 | 61 | 20 | +41 | 39 | |
| 2 | Beerschot | 26 | 17 | 4 | 5 | 75 | 32 | +43 | 38 | |
| 3 | Royale Union Saint-Gilloise | 26 | 15 | 6 | 5 | 67 | 30 | +37 | 36 | |
| 4 | Lierse S.K. | 26 | 16 | 1 | 9 | 64 | 39 | +25 | 33 | |
| 5 | KV Mechelen | 26 | 12 | 6 | 8 | 59 | 55 | +4 | 30 | |
| 6 | White Star | 26 | 13 | 3 | 10 | 68 | 49 | +19 | 29 | |
| 7 | Standard Liège | 26 | 13 | 3 | 10 | 58 | 42 | +16 | 29 | |
| 8 | Royal Antwerp FC | 26 | 10 | 6 | 10 | 50 | 47 | +3 | 26 | |
| 9 | La Gantoise | 26 | 10 | 6 | 10 | 50 | 47 | +3 | 26 | |
| 10 | Club Brugge K.V. | 26 | 9 | 7 | 10 | 39 | 40 | −1 | 25 | |
| 11 | R.S.C. Anderlecht | 26 | 7 | 8 | 11 | 47 | 53 | −6 | 22 | |
| 12 | K. Lyra | 26 | 4 | 7 | 15 | 41 | 88 | −47 | 15 | |
| 13 | K.V. Turnhout | 26 | 2 | 5 | 19 | 33 | 103 | −70 | 9 | Relegated to Division I |
| 14 | K.R.C. Mechelen | 26 | 1 | 5 | 20 | 30 | 97 | −67 | 7 | Relegated to Division I |

== Results ==
| Home \ Away | AND | ANT | BEE | CLU | DAR | GNT | LIE | LYR | KVM | RCM | STA | TUR | USG | WST |
|---|---|---|---|---|---|---|---|---|---|---|---|---|---|---|
| Anderlecht | | 0–1 | 2–8 | 4–1 | 1–1 | 0–0 | 0–3 | 7–2 | 2–4 | 5–2 | 1–1 | 3–0 | 3–2 | 2–6 |
| Antwerp | 2–1 | | 0–0 | 1–1 | 0–4 | 1–1 | 2–3 | 4–0 | 2–0 | 1–1 | 5–0 | 2–0 | 2–2 | 3–1 |
| Beerschot | 1–0 | 2–0 | | 0–0 | 0–2 | 3–2 | 3–2 | 9–1 | 4–0 | 1–5 | 0–1 | 5–1 | 3–2 | 1–0 |
| Club Brugge | 1–1 | 1–1 | 1–0 | | 1–0 | 1–0 | 4–1 | 1–1 | 6–0 | 3–1 | 0–2 | 7–1 | 0–3 | 1–5 |
| Daring Club | 1–1 | 1–0 | 1–1 | 1–0 | | 6–0 | 3–0 | 3–3 | 6–0 | 4–1 | 3–0 | 6–1 | 1–1 | 2–0 |
| La Gantoise | 2–2 | 4–0 | 3–2 | 2–1 | 2–1 | | 1–3 | 7–1 | 1–1 | 2–1 | 0–3 | 6–3 | 3–3 | 4–0 |
| Lierse | 2–1 | 3–2 | 0–1 | 3–1 | 1–2 | 5–0 | | 5–2 | 1–1 | 3–0 | 0–1 | 3–1 | 2–1 | 5–1 |
| Lyra | 2–3 | 1–5 | 1–3 | 2–2 | 0–3 | 1–0 | 1–0 | | 1–1 | 3–0 | 0–2 | 5–0 | 1–3 | 1–4 |
| KV Mechelen | 2–1 | 4–2 | 3–3 | 3–0 | 2–1 | 3–1 | 1–2 | 7–2 | | 6–0 | 2–1 | 6–2 | 0–0 | 2–1 |
| K.R.C. Mechelen | 1–2 | 1–4 | 1–5 | 0–1 | 1–3 | 1–5 | 1–6 | 3–3 | 1–5 | | 2–2 | 2–2 | 1–7 | 1–2 |
| Standard Liège | 3–3 | 7–1 | 1–2 | 4–1 | 0–2 | 1–0 | 1–2 | 6–1 | 4–2 | 7–0 | | 5–2 | 0–1 | 1–6 |
| Turnhout | 1–1 | 2–6 | 0–9 | 1–2 | 1–2 | 1–0 | 1–8 | 2–2 | 1–1 | 1–1 | 5–3 | | 1–4 | 1–4 |
| Union SG | 2–0 | 2–0 | 1–2 | 1–0 | 3–1 | 1–1 | 3–1 | 6–2 | 5–2 | 7–1 | 0–2 | 5–0 | | 1–0 |
| White Star | 2–1 | 5–3 | 2–7 | 2–2 | 0–1 | 2–3 | 4–0 | 2–2 | 5–1 | 7–1 | 1–0 | 5–2 | 1–1 | |

Legend: Blue = home team win; Yellow = draw; Red = away team win.
