= 1938–39 Belgian First Division =

39th season of top-tier football in Belgium

Belgian First Division
- Season: 1938–39

Statistics of Belgian First Division in the 1938–39 season.

== Overview ==
Location of teams in Belgian First Division 1938–39

It was contested by 14 teams, and Beerschot won the championship.

Owing to the outbreak of World War II, the 1939-40 Belgian League season was suspended after 9 matches, and was not restarted until 1941-42 (although an unofficial 1940-41 Championship took place).

== League standings ==
Pos	Team	Pld	W	D	L	GF	GA	GD	Pts	Relegation
1	Beerschot	26	19	3	4	70	29	+41	41	
2	Lierse S.K.	26	13	8	5	67	37	+30	34	
3	R.O.C. de Charleroi-Marchienne	26	15	3	8	60	44	+16	33	
4	KV Mechelen	26	14	4	8	64	45	+19	32	
5	R.S.C. Anderlecht	26	11	6	9	45	47	−2	28	
6	Royale Union Saint-Gilloise	26	9	6	11	57	60	−3	24	
7	K Boom FC	26	9	6	11	40	55	−15	24	
8	Royal Antwerp FC	26	8	7	11	53	51	+2	23	
9	Standard Liège	26	8	7	11	62	67	−5	23	
10	White Star	26	8	6	12	45	64	−19	22	
11	Cercle Brugge K.S.V.	26	8	6	12	38	56	−18	22	
12	La Gantoise	26	7	7	12	32	37	−5	21	
13	Daring Club	26	4	12	10	31	48	−17	20	Relegated to 1941–42 Division I
14	Club Brugge K.V.	26	6	5	15	40	64	−24	17	Relegated to 1941–42 Division I

== Results ==
Home \ Away	AND	ANT	BEE	BOO	CER	CLU	DAR	GNT	LIE	MEC	OLY	STA	USG	WST
Anderlecht		4–3	0–1	2–2	0–1	2–2	3–0	4–0	2–1	1–6	0–2	2–2	1–1	2–1
Antwerp	4–1		1–3	2–3	3–1	6–1	1–1	3–1	2–5	1–1	3–1	3–4	1–2	5–2
Beerschot	2–2	3–0		1–2	2–0	2–0	5–0	4–0	1–1	4–1	5–1	3–1	0–3	3–1
Boom	2–3	1–0	3–2		4–0	4–2	2–2	0–0	2–2	0–1	1–4	2–2	3–2	2–1
Cercle Brugge	0–2	4–3	3–1	1–1		1–1	0–0	1–0	1–8	2–4	2–4	2–2	1–2	4–0
Club Brugge	1–3	4–1	0–3	3–0	2–2		3–2	0–3	1–4	0–2	1–3	3–6	2–0	3–0
Daring Club	1–2	0–2	1–3	6–0	0–0	0–0		0–0	1–2	1–4	0–0	2–1	1–0	0–0
La Gantoise	0–1	1–1	1–2	6–1	1–2	0–0	2–2		1–1	0–3	4–0	3–1	1–0	1–0
Lierse	3–1	3–3	3–3	2–0	1–2	3–0	1–1	3–0		3–0	3–0	4–1	2–0	6–3
KV Mechelen	2–1	2–3	2–3	2–0	0–1	3–2	1–1	2–1	3–2		0–2	8–3	4–1	5–5
Olympic Charleroi	1–1	0–0	0–2	3–1	5–3	4–2	3–0	1–0	4–0	3–2		5–4	0–2	6–0
Standard Liège	6–1	0–0	0–3	0–2	4–1	1–3	7–1	1–0	2–1	4–3	2–5		5–5	0–2
Union SG	2–4	2–2	2–4	2–1	3–1	6–2	3–5	3–3	2–2	0–2	3–2	3–3		7–4
White Star	1–0	1–0	1–5	4–1	3–2	2–2	3–3	1–3	1–1	1–1	3–1	0–0	4–1	

Legend: Blue = home team win; Yellow = draw; Red = away team win.
