= 1962–63 Belgian First Division =

60th season of top-tier football in Belgium

Belgian First Division
- Season: 1962–63

Statistics of Belgian First Division in the 1962–63 season.

== Overview ==
Location of teams in Belgian First Division 1962–63

It was contested by 16 teams, and Standard Liège won the championship.

== League standings ==
Pos	Team	Pld	W	D	L	GF	GA	GD	Pts	Qualification or relegation
1	Standard Liège	30	20	4	6	51	21	+30	44	Qualified for 1963–64 European Cup
2	Royal Antwerp FC	30	19	2	9	57	44	+13	40	
3	R.S.C. Anderlecht	30	15	7	8	54	34	+20	37	
4	La Gantoise	30	15	4	11	55	52	+3	34	Qualified for 1963–64 Inter-Cities Fairs Cup
5	K. Sint-Truidense V.V.	30	11	11	8	41	35	+6	33	
6	Daring Club Bruxelles	30	14	4	12	46	41	+5	32	
7	R.F.C. de Liège	30	14	2	14	41	39	+2	30	Qualified for 1963–64 Inter-Cities Fairs Cup
8	Club Brugge K.V.	30	12	6	12	35	39	−4	30	
9	Lierse S.K.	30	13	3	14	37	42	−5	29	
10	KFC Diest	30	10	6	14	34	42	−8	26	
11	Cercle Brugge K.S.V.	30	10	6	14	31	43	−12	26	
12	Beerschot	30	7	12	11	30	30	0	26	
13	Beringen FC	30	10	5	15	40	49	−9	25	
14	K Berchem Sport	30	10	5	15	26	38	−12	25	
15	Royale Union Saint-Gilloise	30	9	6	15	34	46	−12	24	Relegated to Division II
16	R.O.C. de Charleroi-Marchienne	30	6	7	17	28	45	−17	19	Relegated to Division II

== Results ==
Home \ Away	AND	ANT	BEE	BRC	BER	CER	CLU	DAR	DIE	GNT	FCL	LIE	OLY	STA	STV	USG
Anderlecht		3–1	1–1	0–0	7–0	3–1	3–1	2–1	2–0	4–2	3–1	0–1	3–1	4–2	1–2	1–2
Antwerp	3–1		1–1	1–0	4–1	2–1	1–3	2–1	2–0	5–3	5–1	0–2	4–2	0–1	2–1	4–1
Beerschot	1–1	1–2		3–0	1–1	0–0	0–0	3–0	0–0	5–1	1–0	0–0	1–1	0–0	0–0	0–1
Berchem	1–0	1–2	0–1		3–1	0–2	4–1	0–2	2–1	1–1	0–1	2–0	2–3	1–0	0–1	1–0
Beringen	0–2	3–0	4–2	5–2		3–1	1–0	7–1	1–2	0–1	0–1	1–0	1–0	1–2	0–0	0–0
Cercle Brugge	1–1	0–1	1–0	0–0	2–1		0–2	2–1	1–3	1–2	3–0	0–1	1–0	1–1	3–1	1–0
Club Brugge	0–0	4–1	2–0	1–0	3–1	1–3		0–3	1–0	5–3	0–1	2–1	2–1	0–1	1–1	1–1
Daring Club	2–0	1–2	0–1	0–0	2–0	2–1	1–1		1–2	1–0	3–1	3–1	3–1	3–1	1–2	2–0
Diest	1–3	1–1	1–0	1–2	2–0	1–1	0–1	2–2		1–0	0–3	4–1	3–0	0–1	0–0	3–2
La Gantoise	1–1	1–0	3–1	0–0	4–2	3–0	1–0	1–2	4–2		1–0	3–2	2–2	1–2	5–1	2–1
Liège	1–2	0–1	2–1	0–1	0–0	2–0	2–0	4–1	2–1	3–5		5–0	3–0	0–1	1–0	3–0
Lierse	2–1	0–1	0–3	1–3	2–1	6–0	2–0	2–1	3–1	2–1	2–0		1–0	2–4	1–0	1–1
Olympic Charleroi	1–2	4–1	1–1	2–0	2–0	1–0	1–0	0–2	0–1	1–2	1–2	1–1		1–2	0–0	0–2
Standard Liège	0–1	1–2	2–0	3–0	0–0	3–0	4–0	1–0	0–0	4–0	3–1	1–0	2–0		1–2	5–0
Sint-Truiden	3–1	4–3	4–2	2–0	0–1	1–1	1–1	1–1	5–1	3–1	0–0	1–0	1–1	1–2		1–2
Union SG	1–1	1–3	1–0	3–0	3–4	1–3	1–2	1–3	1–0	0–1	4–1	2–0	0–0	0–1	2–2	

Legend: Blue = home team win; Yellow = draw; Red = away team win.
