= 1948–49 Belgian First Division =

46th season of top-tier football in Belgium

Belgian First Division
- Season: 1948–49

Statistics of Belgian First Division in the 1948–49 season.

== Overview ==
Location of teams in Belgian First Division 1948–49

It was contested by 16 teams, and R.S.C. Anderlecht won the championship.

== League standings ==
Pos	Team	Pld	W	D	L	GF	GA	GD	Pts	Relegation
1	R.S.C. Anderlecht	30	20	1	9	72	45	+27	41	
2	K Berchem Sport	30	16	6	8	56	38	+18	38	
3	Standard Liège	30	17	4	9	57	48	+9	38	
4	R. Charleroi S.C.	30	15	6	9	70	47	+23	36	
5	K.R.C. Mechelen	30	13	8	9	57	49	+8	34	
6	Beerschot	30	15	3	12	54	46	+8	33	
7	KV Mechelen	30	10	12	8	52	52	0	32	
8	R.F.C. de Liège	30	14	2	14	71	52	+19	30	
9	Royal Antwerp FC	30	10	7	13	47	51	−4	27	
10	R.R.C. Bruxelles	30	10	7	13	56	71	−15	27	
11	K. Lyra	30	9	8	13	45	67	−22	26	
12	K.A.A. Gent	30	8	9	13	50	57	−7	25	
13	Tilleur FC	30	8	9	13	34	46	−12	25	
14	R.O.C. de Charleroi-Marchienne	30	9	7	14	36	49	−13	25	
15	K Boom FC	30	7	9	14	40	60	−20	23	Relegated to Division I
16	Royale Union Saint-Gilloise	30	8	4	18	49	70	−21	20	Relegated to Division I

== Results ==
Home \ Away	AND	ANT	BEE	BRC	BOO	RCB	CHA	GNT	FCL	LYR	KVM	OLY	RCM	STA	TIL	USG
Anderlecht		3–1	2–1	1–1	3–2	2–0	2–1	2–0	3–2	3–2	5–0	1–0	5–2	6–3	0–1	2–1
Antwerp	2–1		1–1	1–2	5–0	3–2	2–2	3–0	0–2	2–3	1–1	1–0	2–3	1–0	0–0	2–0
Beerschot	2–1	2–0		2–1	3–0	2–3	1–4	1–4	3–1	3–2	3–0	2–1	2–2	0–2	2–2	2–1
Berchem	1–0	1–2	3–1		1–3	4–0	1–2	1–1	1–3	4–1	1–1	3–0	3–2	2–3	0–0	1–1
Boom	0–3	1–1	0–3	1–0		3–3	2–2	1–1	4–2	2–2	2–2	5–1	1–1	0–1	5–1	3–1
Racing Bruxelles	0–2	3–0	0–5	2–2	2–2		3–3	3–1	6–0	1–2	1–1	1–0	3–1	2–1	6–3	3–2
Charleroi	4–5	3–0	0–2	0–1	4–0	3–1		4–1	3–1	2–2	1–0	1–3	7–1	2–3	1–0	6–1
La Gantoise	0–2	4–2	2–5	0–2	2–2	3–0	1–4		3–2	5–1	0–0	1–1	0–3	3–0	1–1	4–1
Liège	4–1	4–0	2–0	2–3	6–0	6–1	4–1	2–2		6–0	4–1	4–0	3–1	2–1	2–2	1–0
Lyra	1–5	2–5	2–0	3–1	1–0	3–1	0–0	1–0	4–2		1–4	0–1	1–1	1–6	3–3	1–0
K.R.C. Mechelen	4–1	1–4	3–0	2–2	2–0	3–3	1–1	3–1	3–2	2–2		0–2	0–3	2–1	3–1	2–1
Olympic Charleroi	1–3	2–2	1–2	2–3	1–0	5–1	0–2	0–0	2–1	2–0	2–2		3–1	1–5	1–1	3–3
KV Mechelen	4–2	1–0	3–1	0–1	2–0	1–1	2–3	1–1	2–0	1–1	1–4	0–0		5–0	2–0	3–1
Standard Liège	1–0	1–0	1–0	0–3	2–0	2–0	1–2	4–2	3–1	2–1	2–2	2–0	2–2		1–0	2–2
Tilleur	2–5	3–1	1–0	0–1	0–1	4–1	3–2	0–4	1–0	1–0	0–0	0–1	0–1	1–1		0–1
Union SG	2–1	3–3	1–2	2–3	2–0	2–3	3–0	4–3	1–0	2–2	4–3	2–0	2–5	3–4	0–3	

Legend: Blue = home team win; Yellow = draw; Red = away team win.
