= 1928–29 Belgian First Division =

29th season of top-tier football in Belgium

Belgian First Division
- Season: 1928–29

Statistics of Belgian First Division in the 1928–29 season.

== Overview ==
Location of teams in Belgian First Division 1928–29

It was contested by 14 teams, and Royal Antwerp FC won the championship.

== League standings ==
Pos	Team	Pld	W	D	L	GF	GA	GD	Pts	Qualification or relegation
1	Royal Antwerp FC	26	17	5	4	50	24	+26	39	Championship play-off
2	Beerschot	26	16	7	3	62	31	+31	39	Championship play-off
3	K.R.C. Mechelen	26	14	3	9	58	56	+2	31	
4	Cercle Brugge K.S.V.	26	13	3	10	50	39	+11	29	
5	RC de Gand	26	11	6	9	60	49	+11	28	
6	KV Mechelen	26	9	8	9	62	45	+17	26	
7	K Berchem Sport	26	10	6	10	48	44	+4	26	
8	R.R.C. Bruxelles	26	9	8	9	48	41	+7	26	
9	Daring Club	26	9	7	10	38	45	−7	25	
10	Lierse S.K.	26	8	7	11	40	47	−7	23	
11	Royale Union Saint-Gilloise	26	6	11	9	53	65	−12	23	
12	Standard Liège	26	9	5	12	38	55	−17	23	
13	La Gantoise	26	7	3	16	53	76	−23	17	Relegated to Division I
14	Tilleur	26	4	1	21	36	79	−43	9	Relegated to Division I

== Results ==
Home \ Away	ANT	BEE	BRC	CER	DAR	RCB	GNT	GAN	LIE	KVM	RCM	STA	TIL	USG
Antwerp		2–3	2–0	3–0	2–0	5–2	4–1	3–0	2–0	0–0	1–1	3–0	2–1	2–2
Beerschot	0–3		0–0	3–0	1–1	2–0	6–2	4–2	1–4	2–0	2–0	6–2	4–0	3–0
Berchem	4–0	0–1		0–2	1–1	2–3	1–2	3–4	5–3	2–0	1–1	1–2	2–0	2–2
Cercle Brugge	1–1	1–2	1–2		4–0	3–1	3–5	4–0	1–2	2–2	2–1	2–0	5–0	3–4
Daring Club	0–1	2–2	2–2	2–0		0–0	3–0	3–0	2–0	1–0	1–3	0–1	2–1	4–2
Racing Bruxelles	1–2	1–2	0–0	3–1	2–0		3–1	1–2	2–0	2–2	8–2	2–0	2–0	3–3
ARA La Gantoise	1–2	2–4	2–3	2–3	1–1	5–3		0–3	1–0	2–1	2–3	2–2	7–0	2–1
Racing Gand	0–1	1–1	1–1	0–2	6–1	1–0	4–0		5–1	4–4	2–0	0–2	5–1	1–1
Lierse	3–2	2–2	1–1	0–1	2–2	2–2	4–1	2–2		3–2	2–1	1–2	2–1	1–3
KV Mechelen	0–1	2–2	2–1	1–2	7–1	3–0	3–2	1–1	0–0		6–4	7–0	3–1	5–1
K.R.C. Mechelen	3–2	0–4	6–4	1–0	1–0	2–0	7–3	3–1	2–1	2–1		6–2	1–0	1–1
Standard Liège	0–0	1–0	1–3	0–2	4–1	0–1	2–2	2–3	1–2	3–1	3–1		1–1	3–1
Tilleur	0–2	1–3	2–4	1–2	2–4	2–4	5–1	3–9	1–0	3–6	4–2	5–2		0–1
Union SG	1–2	2–2	0–3	3–3	0–4	2–2	5–4	5–3	2–2	3–3	3–4	2–2	3–1	

Legend: Blue = home team win; Yellow = draw; Red = away team win.

== Championship play-off ==
Team 1	Score	Team 2
Royal Antwerp FC	2 - 0	Beerschot

== See also ==
- 1985–86 Belgian First Division – also decided by a playoff
