= 1960–61 Belgian First Division =

58th season of top-tier football in Belgium

Belgian First Division
- Season: 1960–61

Statistics of Belgian First Division in the 1960–61 season.

== Overview ==
Location of teams in Belgian First Division 1960–61

It was contested by 16 teams, and Standard Liège won the championship.

== League standings ==
Pos	Team	Pld	W	D	L	GF	GA	GD	Pts	Qualification or relegation
1	Standard Liège	30	18	9	3	67	25	+42	45	Qualified for 1961–62 European Cup
2	R.F.C. de Liège	30	15	11	4	50	25	+25	41	
3	R.S.C. Anderlecht	30	15	7	8	56	28	+28	37	
4	Beerschot	30	13	7	10	47	38	+9	33	
5	Daring Club Bruxelles	30	13	7	10	42	44	−2	33	
6	K. Waterschei S.V. Thor Genk	30	13	6	11	49	39	+10	32	
7	K. Sint-Truidense V.V.	30	12	7	11	32	33	−1	31	
8	Club Brugge K.V.	30	9	11	10	45	50	−5	29	
9	Royal Antwerp FC	30	11	7	12	46	46	0	29	
10	Eendracht Alost	30	9	10	11	47	63	−16	28	
11	La Gantoise	30	10	8	12	49	43	+6	28	
12	Lierse S.K.	30	10	8	12	45	58	−13	28	
13	R.O.C. de Charleroi-Marchienne	30	6	14	10	27	42	−15	26	
14	Royale Union Saint-Gilloise	30	10	3	17	41	57	−16	23	Qualified for 1961–62 Inter-Cities Fairs Cup
15	R.C.S. Verviétois	30	5	9	16	27	51	−24	19	Relegated to Division II
16	Patro Eisden	30	6	6	18	26	54	−28	18	Relegated to Division II

== Results ==
Home \ Away	AAL	AND	ANT	BEE	CLU	DAR	EIS	GNT	FCL	LIE	OLY	STA	STV	USG	VER	WTG
Eendracht Alost		0–0	3–2	1–1	3–1	1–2	2–0	1–1	2–2	1–3	2–2	3–3	3–0	2–0	0–4	3–1
Anderlecht	7–0		3–2	1–0	0–0	1–0	0–1	0–5 (Note: The match between Anderlecht and La Gantoise (15th day played after the 30th) ended with the score of 1–2 in favor of the "Buffalos". But the Sports Committee inflicts a loss by forfeit (0–5) to the "Mauves" because they have fielded an unqualified player.)	2–3	4–0	1–1	1–1	1–0	3–0	2–2	3–1
Antwerp	2–1	0–2		3–0	0–0	2–3	2–2	1–3	3–2	2–1	1–0	1–4	2–0	3–1	4–1	2–2
Beerschot	9–2	1–0	2–1		2–3	2–1	3–2	2–0	0–2	3–0	3–1	1–2	1–1	3–0	1–0	0–0
Club Brugge	2–2	3–2	1–1	3–2		4–2	3–1	0–1	1–1	4–1	3–0	1–1	2–0	1–2	1–1	0–0
Daring Club	0–0	1–0	1–1	1–0	1–0		2–1	3–1	1–1	2–2	1–1	3–1	0–3	1–3	2–0	3–0
Patro Eisden	3–1	0–1	2–0	0–1	1–1	0–1		0–5	1–3	0–2	2–2	0–3	0–0	1–1	3–2	2–1
La Gantoise	1–2	3–1	1–2	3–0	4–1	0–1	1–1		1–1	1–1	1–1	2–1	3–0	1–3	0–2	4–2
Liège	3–1	0–0	1–1	3–2	1–1	0–0	3–1	2–1		2–0	1–1	0–0	1–0	2–1	1–0	0–1
Lierse	3–1	1–2	2–2	1–1	6–2	3–4	1–0	1–0	1–1		1–0	0–6	2–0	3–2	1–1	3–1
Olympic Charleroi	1–1	0–7	2–0	4–1	3–0	2–1	1–0	1–1	0–3	0–0		0–2	1–2	1–0	0–0	1–1
Standard Liège	3–0	2–1	2–0	1–0	2–2	7–0	4–0	3–1	2–0	2–1	0–0		1–0	2–0	5–2	1–2
Sint-Truiden	2–2	2–2	1–0	0–0	4–0	1–0	2–0	3–2	1–0	3–1	1–1	0–2		1–0	1–0	0–0
Union SG	5–2	0–2	0–1	1–3	4–1	3–4	4–0	2–1	0–9	4–4	1–0	0–0	3–0		1–0	0–1
Verviers	0–4	0–2	2–2	0–0	0–3	2–1	2–0	2–2	0–1	2–0	0–0	3–3	1–3	1–0		1–3
Waterschei Thor	1–0	2–4	3–0	2–3	2–1	2–1	0–2	2–2	0–1	5–0	5–0	1–1	2–1	4–0	4–0	

Legend: Blue = home team win; Yellow = draw; Red = away team win.
