= K. Boom F.C. =

Belgian Association football club

K. Boom F.C. (Koninklijke Boom Football Club) was a Belgian football club founded as Rupel FC Boom in 1908 in Boom, near Antwerp. It changed its name in 1913 to Boom Football Club. It received the matricule n°58.

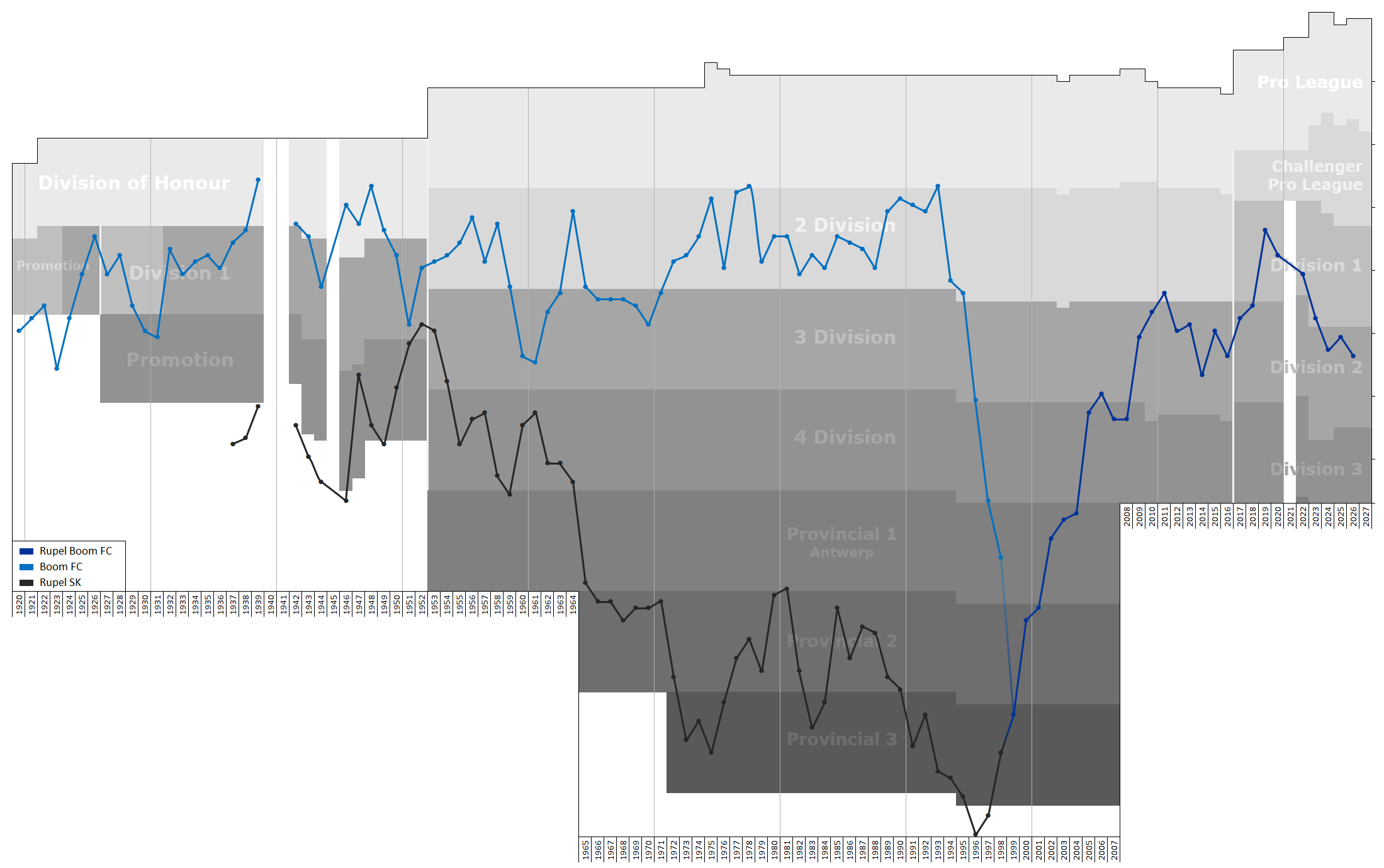
Historical chart of Boom league performance

It last played in the Belgian First Division in the 1992/1993 season.

Due to financial, sporting and home ground difficulties, the club merged with neighbours S.K. Rupel in 1998 to form K Rupel Boom FC (matricule n°2138) and the matricule n°58 was subsequently erased.

== Honours ==
- Belgian Second Division:
  - Winners (2): 1938, 1977
  - Promotion (1): 1992
- Belgian Third Division
  - Champions (2): 1963, 1971
  - Promotion (2): 1926, 1931
