= 1964–65 Belgian First Division =

62nd season of top-tier football in Belgium

Belgian First Division
- Season: 1964–65

Statistics of Belgian First Division in the 1964–65 season.

== Overview ==
Location of teams in Belgian First Division 1964–65

It was contested by 16 teams, and R.S.C. Anderlecht won the championship.

== League standings ==
Pos	Team	Pld	W	D	L	GF	GA	GD	Pts	Qualification or relegation
1	R.S.C. Anderlecht	30	24	3	3	87	22	+65	51	Qualified for 1965–66 European Cup
2	Standard Liège	30	15	9	6	50	34	+16	39	Qualified for 1965–66 European Cup Winners' Cup
3	Beerschot	30	14	7	9	51	27	+24	35	
4	R.F.C. Tilleur-Saint-Nicolas	30	12	10	8	63	47	+16	34	
5	K. Sint-Truidense V.V.	30	12	9	9	50	41	+9	33	
6	R.F.C. de Liège	30	11	10	9	40	31	+9	32	Qualified for 1965–66 Inter-Cities Fairs Cup
7	Lierse S.K.	30	14	2	14	50	49	+1	30	
8	Beringen FC	30	11	6	13	46	62	−16	28	
9	Club Brugge K.V.	30	10	8	12	52	36	+16	28	
10	Daring Club Bruxelles	30	9	10	11	36	53	−17	28	Qualified for 1965–66 Inter-Cities Fairs Cup
11	Cercle Brugge K.S.V.	30	8	9	13	36	60	−24	25	
12	La Gantoise	30	6	13	11	37	45	−8	25	
13	Royal Antwerp FC	30	8	8	14	27	60	−33	24	Qualified for 1965–66 Inter-Cities Fairs Cup
14	K Berchem Sport	30	7	10	13	30	48	−18	24	
15	Royale Union Saint-Gilloise	30	7	8	15	32	58	−26	22	Relegated to Belgian Second Division
16	KFC Diest	30	6	10	14	40	54	−14	22	Relegated to Belgian Second Division

== Results ==
Home \ Away	AND	ANT	BEE	BRC	BER	CER	CLU	DAR	DIE	GNT	FCL	LIE	STA	STV	TIL	USG
Anderlecht		6–0	1–1	3–1	7–0	4–1	3–1	4–0	3–2	3–0	3–0	1–3	3–1	2–2	8–1	3–0
Antwerp	0–4		0–0	1–1	1–0	0–1	1–1	1–3	1–0	1–1	0–3	1–0	3–1	1–2	2–1	1–1
Beerschot	0–2	1–2		1–1	2–1	5–0	1–2	4–0	3–3	0–0	2–1	1–0	0–0	5–0	2–0	3–0
Berchem	1–2	3–1	0–5		2–0	2–0	2–0	2–2	1–0	0–2	0–1	0–1	1–1	0–0	1–1	1–1
Beringen	2–1	1–1	4–0	4–0		2–1	1–0	5–3	4–0	3–2	2–1	0–2	0–4	1–1	3–1	0–0
Cercle Brugge	1–2	1–1	1–0	2–2	4–4		0–3	2–2	1–1	2–1	1–1	4–3	2–3	1–0	3–1	1–2
Club Brugge	0–0	0–1	0–2	4–0	6–0	1–1		6–0	4–1	1–2	0–0	1–1	5–0	3–3	1–2	4–0
Daring Club	0–5	0–1	1–3	1–0	1–0	1–0	0–0		1–1	4–1	0–0	1–0	3–1	2–3	0–0	2–2
Diest	0–1	0–0	1–0	2–1	1–1	1–2	0–2	1–1		2–2	6–0	3–1	2–2	1–5	1–2	4–1
La Gantoise	2–3	4–1	3–2	0–2	2–0	1–1	2–2	0–0	3–1		3–3	2–4	0–0	1–1	1–1	0–0
Liège	0–1	1–0	0–3	0–0	8–3	0–0	2–0	0–0	3–1	1–0		4–0	0–1	0–0	1–1	6–0
Lierse	0–4	5–2	1–0	1–1	5–2	0–2	1–3	3–1	0–1	3–0	0–1		2–3	2–1	3–1	5–2
Standard Liège	0–2	5–1	1–0	3–1	2–0	5–0	2–1	3–1	2–2	0–0	1–1	1–0		3–0	2–2	2–0
Sint-Truiden	1–4	2–1	0–1	0–2	2–2	8–0	3–0	0–2	2–0	1–0	1–0	1–2	3–0		2–2	3–2
Tilleur	1–0	10–1	1–1	6–2	0–1	3–1	3–1	4–1	6–2	3–2	0–1	4–0	0–0	0–0		3–1
Union SG	1–3	2–0	1–3	3–0	2–1	1–0	2–0	1–3	0–0	0–0	2–1	1–2	1–3	0–1	3–3	

Legend: Blue = home team win; Yellow = draw; Red = away team win.
