= 1958–59 Belgian First Division =

56th season of top-tier football in Belgium

Belgian First Division
- Season: 1958–59

Statistics of Belgian First Division in the 1958–59 season.

== Overview ==
Location of teams in Belgian First Division 1958–59

It was contested by 16 teams, and R.S.C. Anderlecht won the championship.

== League standings ==
Pos	Team	Pld	W	D	L	GF	GA	GD	Pts	Qualification or relegation
1	R.S.C. Anderlecht	30	19	6	5	72	23	+49	44	Qualified for 1959–60 European Cup
2	R.F.C. de Liège	30	19	5	6	55	28	+27	43	
3	Standard Liège	30	16	10	4	64	31	+33	42	
4	Beerschot	30	14	9	7	57	39	+18	37	
5	La Gantoise	30	14	5	11	65	38	+27	33	
6	Royal Antwerp FC	30	14	5	11	60	43	+17	33	
7	K. Waterschei S.V. Thor Genk	30	12	8	10	47	43	+4	32	
8	Lierse S.K.	30	12	7	11	58	53	+5	31	
9	Royale Union Saint-Gilloise	30	13	4	13	64	64	0	30	
10	K Berchem Sport	30	9	10	11	47	61	−14	28	
11	R.O.C. de Charleroi-Marchienne	30	10	6	14	50	68	−18	26	
12	Beringen FC	30	10	5	15	46	66	−20	25	
13	R.C.S. Verviétois	30	8	7	15	30	49	−19	23	
14	K. Sint-Truidense V.V.	30	8	6	16	50	77	−27	22	
15	R.F.C. Tournai	30	5	7	18	37	83	−46	17	Relegated to Division II
16	Tilleur FC	30	6	2	22	36	72	−36	14	Relegated to Division II

== Results ==
Home \ Away	AND	ANT	BEE	BRC	BER	GNT	FCL	LIE	OLY	STA	STV	USG	TIL	TOU	VER	WTG
Anderlecht		1–1	5–1	3–0	5–1	1–4	3–0	1–0	3–1	0–2	7–1	5–1	4–1	8–0	4–0	5–0
Antwerp	2–2		2–6	5–2	2–2	4–0	2–1	2–1	4–0	1–1	2–0	3–0	3–1	2–1	0–1	3–1
Beerschot	0–0	2–2		1–1	1–1	1–0	0–1	0–0	5–1	1–1	3–1	4–2	3–0	3–1	1–0	2–0
Berchem	2–1	1–0	2–2		5–2	0–0	0–2	4–1	1–1	2–2	4–2	1–0	3–1	0–0	1–0	2–2
Beringen	0–0	4–0	0–3	5–2		0–5	1–3	5–1	2–0	2–5	2–2	0–3	1–0	1–1	3–0	1–0
La Gantoise	0–1	1–0	2–4	0–1	3–0		0–1	4–1	1–1	0–1	5–1	3–4	7–0	3–1	0–0	2–2
Liège	1–0	2–1	1–1	5–2	2–1	0–0		1–1	3–0	1–1	3–2	3–1	0–1	5–1	2–0	0–3
Lierse	2–2	2–0	1–0	1–1	5–1	3–1	1–3		4–2	2–2	4–0	4–1	0–0	6–1	2–0	3–1
Olympic Charleroi	1–2	2–5	3–2	3–1	5–1	1–3	2–5	3–3		3–3	2–1	1–5	3–1	3–0	2–1	1–1
Standard Liège	0–2	2–1	2–0	4–1	2–0	1–2	1–0	0–2	3–1		3–0	6–1	3–1	0–0	1–1	0–1
Sint-Truiden	0–0	2–1	1–2	4–1	4–2	2–3	0–1	1–0	2–3	1–7		0–3	3–2	2–1	5–3	1–1
Union SG	0–1	3–2	4–2	2–2	3–1	1–3	0–2	3–1	4–1	0–2	2–2		0–2	5–0	1–0	1–1
Tilleur	0–2	0–2	1–3	4–1	0–2	2–7	0–2	5–1	0–2	1–2	2–3	2–5		2–4	3–0	2–1
Tournai	0–2	0–2	2–3	3–2	0–2	1–6	2–2	3–4	1–1	2–5	2–1	3–3	1–1		3–1	0–5
Verviers	0–1	0–5	1–1	1–1	3–1	2–0	0–3	2–1	0–1	1–1	3–3	5–2	1–0	2–0		0–0
Waterschei Thor	2–1	2–1	1–0	4–1	1–2	1–0	1–0	4–1	1–0	1–1	3–3	2–4	3–1	1–3	1–2	

Legend: Blue = home team win; Yellow = draw; Red = away team win.
