= Sporting Club de Bruxelles =

Belgian football club

Sporting CB
- Full name: Sporting Club de Bruxelles
- Founded: 1894; 131 years ago
- Dissolved: 1897; 128 years ago
- Stadium: Avenue Dailly
- Capacity: 2,000
- League: Belgian First Division A
- 1896–97: 6º
| Home colours | Away colours |

Sporting Club de Bruxelles was an ephemeric football club in Belgium that existed only for three years. It was founded in 1894 as Ixelles Sporting Club but the name was changed to Sporting Club de Bruxelles before the first Belgian Championship was held in 1895–96. The club finished 3rd behind F.C. Liégeois and Antwerp FC. However, the club withdrew during the next season and was dissolved.

They had in the Belgian Domestic League 6 victories, 15 defeats and 1 draw.

== Colours ==
The team's home colours were blue and black.

== Stadium ==
- 1894 : Cinquantenaire Park, Brussels
- 1896 : Leopold Park, Brussels
- 1897 : Tir national, Schaerbeek
- 1897 : rue Dailly à Schaerbeek

== Anecdotes ==
On 10 January 1897, the team lost 18 – 0 against Racing Club de Bruxelles. This result is the biggest gap between two teams in the Belgian Domestic League.

== Sources ==
- Belgian football clubs history
- RSSSF Archive
