= 1930–31 Belgian First Division =

31st season of top-tier football in Belgium

Belgian First Division
- Season: 1930–31
- Champions: Antwerp
- Relegated: Montegnée, Anderlecht
- Matches: 182
- Goals: 786 (4.32 per match)
- Top goalscorer: Secretin (21 goals)
- Biggest home win: Anderlecht 10–1 Montegnée
- Biggest away win: Montegnée 0–8 KV Mechelen
- Highest scoring: Standard 3–12 Club Brugge

The 1930–31 Belgian First Division was the 31st season of top-tier football in Belgium. It was contested by 14 teams, and Antwerp won the championship.

== Overview ==
Location of teams in Belgian First Division 1930–31

== League standings ==
Pos	Team	Pld	W	D	L	GF	GA	GD	Pts	Relegation
1	Antwerp	26	17	3	6	77	39	+38	37	
2	KV Mechelen	26	16	2	8	71	39	+32	34	
3	Berchem	26	14	5	7	51	37	+14	33	
4	Beerschot	26	14	5	7	56	46	+10	33	
5	Club Brugge	26	13	3	10	55	45	+10	29	
6	Daring Club	26	12	4	10	45	41	+4	28	
7	Cercle Brugge	26	12	2	12	52	38	+14	26	
8	Lierse	26	11	2	13	57	61	−4	24	
9	Standard	26	9	5	12	45	66	−21	23	
10	K.R.C. Mechelen	26	11	1	14	51	59	−8	23	
11	Tubantia	26	7	7	12	40	64	−24	21	
12	Union SG	26	8	3	15	49	63	−14	19	
13	Montegnée	26	8	3	15	51	90	−39	19	Relegated to Division I
14	Anderlecht	26	3	9	14	45	57	−12	15	Relegated to Division I

== Results ==
Home \ Away	AND	ANT	BEE	BRC	CER	CLU	DAR	LIE	KVM	RCM	MON	STA	TUB	USG
Anderlecht		1–2	2–2	1–1	0–3	1–1	1–2	2–2	3–5	3–1	10–1	1–1	0–0	1–1
Antwerp	6–2		2–3	4–0	3–2	3–0	4–2	4–2	0–3	5–1	4–1	6–1	5–1	8–4
Beerschot	1–4	1–1		2–2	2–0	6–1	2–1	3–1	2–1	1–0	4–2	0–0	7–4	1–3
Berchem	2–2	1–1	2–0		0–2	2–1	2–0	2–1	2–1	1–0	6–1	4–0	3–0	3–0
Cercle Brugge	2–1	0–1	1–1	4–0		2–0	2–3	4–1	0–2	2–0	7–2	0–1	1–1	3–0
Club Brugge	2–2	3–1	0–1	0–3	2–1		2–0	3–2	1–2	4–0	3–2	2–1	2–2	4–1
Daring Club	2–1	1–0	2–0	3–0	3–0	3–0		2–2	0–1	2–3	0–4	1–3	2–1	1–0
Lierse	3–1	2–1	5–1	3–1	1–2	0–3	3–2		5–1	0–7	5–0	1–2	2–0	1–4
KV Mechelen	4–1	1–1	2–5	2–0	4–2	3–1	1–2	2–3		3–0	8–1	2–1	3–1	4–0
K.R.C. Mechelen	3–1	2–5	3–1	3–4	2–4	2–0	4–1	4–3	0–2		1–3	2–1	4–1	3–1
Montegnée	3–1	2–1	2–4	2–2	2–1	0–1	2–2	4–3	0–8	1–2		2–2	7–2	4–1
Standard	3–2	1–2	2–4	1–4	2–5	3–12	2–2	2–3	3–2	2–1	4–2		0–0	2–1
Tubantia	2–1	2–4	2–0	1–0	1–0	1–3	0–5	3–1	3–3	1–1	2–0	3–5		3–2
Union SG	2–0	0–3	1–2	2–4	3–2	1–4	1–1	1–2	2–1	7–2	6–1	2–0	3–3	

Legend: Blue = home team win; Yellow = draw; Red = away team win.
