= 1953–54 Belgian First Division =

51st season of top-tier football in Belgium

Belgian First Division
- Season: 1953–54

Statistics of Belgian First Division in the 1953–54 season.

== Overview ==
Location of teams in Belgian First Division 1953–54

It was contested by 16 teams, and R.S.C. Anderlecht won the championship.

== League standings ==
Pos	Team	Pld	W	D	L	GF	GA	GD	Pts	Qualification or relegation
1	R.S.C. Anderlecht	30	14	9	7	76	51	+25	37	
2	KV Mechelen	30	12	12	6	47	41	+6	36	
3	La Gantoise	30	13	10	7	65	47	+18	36	
4	Beerschot	30	13	9	8	54	40	+14	35	
5	R.F.C. de Liège	30	15	4	11	68	51	+17	34	
6	K.R.C. Mechelen	30	11	9	10	55	55	0	31	
7	Royal Antwerp FC	30	12	7	11	49	50	−1	31	
8	Lierse S.K.	30	13	5	12	47	45	+2	31	
9	R.O.C. de Charleroi-Marchienne	30	11	8	11	54	55	−1	30	
10	R. Charleroi S.C.	30	10	8	12	41	49	−8	28	
11	K Berchem Sport	30	11	6	13	38	53	−15	28	
12	Tilleur FC	30	12	4	14	48	50	−2	28	
13	Standard Liège	30	9	9	12	49	55	−6	27	
14	Royale Union Saint-Gilloise	30	9	9	12	52	60	−8	27	
15	Daring Club	30	11	4	15	49	61	−12	26	Relegated to Division II
16	K. Lyra	30	2	11	17	30	59	−29	15	Relegated to Division II

== Results ==
Home \ Away	AND	ANT	BEE	BRC	CHA	DAR	GNT	FCL	LIE	LYR	KVM	RCM	OLY	STA	USG	TIL
Anderlecht		1–3	3–0	2–1	2–2	7–1	2–2	2–1	1–2	2–0	4–1	4–4	5–3	2–1	4–4	3–1
Antwerp	1–0		1–2	1–2	1–0	3–1	2–1	1–4	3–0	1–3	5–1	2–2	0–1	0–2	2–2	3–0
Beerschot	3–2	1–1		1–0	4–0	3–0	1–1	2–2	1–0	2–1	3–1	1–1	5–1	1–2	4–1	3–2
Berchem	0–5	0–1	2–1		1–1	5–2	1–1	2–0	0–0	1–0	3–3	2–1	1–3	2–0	2–1	1–0
Charleroi	0–3	3–0	1–0	3–0		0–1	1–1	1–1	1–0	1–1	1–1	3–2	1–1	0–3	2–1	0–1
Daring Club	0–4	2–3	2–3	2–1	0–3		0–3	3–0	6–1	3–1	2–5	3–2	4–0	1–1	2–0	0–3
La Gantoise	2–4	4–4	0–0	4–2	1–2	2–0		2–0	3–1	1–1	4–1	4–2	4–4	4–0	1–1	2–1
Liège	4–0	7–2	1–0	4–0	1–3	3–2	4–1		2–0	4–1	1–1	0–1	5–2	4–2	3–1	2–3
Lierse	2–3	0–0	3–2	5–0	5–3	2–0	3–5	3–1		0–0	2–0	1–1	1–0	5–1	2–1	1–2
Lyra	0–0	1–2	0–0	3–5	3–0	1–2	0–1	1–4	0–2		1–1	0–2	1–6	3–3	2–2	1–1
KV Mechelen	2–1	2–0	1–1	0–0	2–1	0–0	0–0	2–1	0–2	2–2		2–2	5–1	3–0	2–0	2–0
K.R.C. Mechelen	3–3	3–1	1–4	3–0	3–3	2–1	1–0	3–4	1–1	2–1	0–1		1–0	3–0	2–4	3–1
Olympic Charleroi	2–2	1–1	3–1	1–1	4–1	1–3	1–0	5–1	2–0	1–0	0–0	3–0		1–1	2–1	1–2
Standard Liège	3–2	2–2	2–2	3–1	2–3	0–0	3–2	0–2	4–1	5–0	1–2	1–1	1–1		3–1	1–1
Union SG	2–2	2–0	2–2	2–1	2–1	1–1	3–6	4–1	1–0	2–2	1–1	2–3	3–2	1–0		3–1
Tilleur	1–1	0–3	3–1	0–1	2–0	1–5	2–3	1–1	1–2	1–0	2–3	3–0	4–1	4–2	4–1	

Legend: Blue = home team win; Yellow = draw; Red = away team win.
