= 1937–38 Belgian First Division =

38th season of top-tier football in Belgium

Belgian First Division
- Season: 1937–38

Statistics of Belgian First Division in the 1937–38 season.

== Overview ==
Location of teams in Belgian First Division 1937–38

It was contested by 14 teams, and Beerschot won the championship.

== League standings ==
Pos	Team	Pld	W	D	L	GF	GA	GD	Pts	Relegation
1	Beerschot	26	18	5	3	83	31	+52	41	
2	Daring Club	26	15	6	5	69	31	+38	36	
3	Royale Union Saint-Gilloise	26	13	5	8	69	48	+21	31	
4	Royal Antwerp FC	26	11	6	9	48	46	+2	28	
5	Club Brugge K.V.	26	11	5	10	39	53	−14	27	
6	La Gantoise	26	12	3	11	52	45	+7	27	
7	Standard Liège	26	12	2	12	60	68	−8	26	
8	R.S.C. Anderlecht	26	10	5	11	43	47	−4	25	
9	Lierse S.K.	26	10	5	11	50	55	−5	25	
10	White Star	26	11	3	12	61	66	−5	25	
11	R.O.C. de Charleroi-Marchienne	26	7	8	11	59	57	+2	22	
12	KV Mechelen	26	7	7	12	41	59	−18	21	
13	K. Lyra	26	6	4	16	40	77	−37	16	Relegated to Division I
14	K.V.K. Tienen	26	5	4	17	31	62	−31	14	Relegated to Division I

== Results ==
Home \ Away	AND	ANT	BEE	CLU	DAR	GNT	LIE	LYR	MEC	OLY	STA	TIE	USG	WST
Anderlecht		1–2	1–6	3–1	0–4	1–1	1–0	10–1	3–1	2–1	2–1	3–0	3–4	2–1
Antwerp	1–1		1–2	0–2	3–0	2–1	2–2	2–0	5–1	1–4	1–2	2–1	1–1	3–3
Beerschot	3–0	3–0		1–1	1–1	0–3	2–1	8–1	2–2	5–3	7–1	2–1	4–1	6–0
Club Brugge	2–0	5–2	0–3		1–5	0–1	2–0	0–4	3–2	2–2	3–1	1–0	2–0	2–1
Daring Club	0–0	1–2	1–1	4–1		2–0	1–2	2–1	7–1	3–1	2–2	3–0	1–0	4–1
La Gantoise	1–3	1–3	2–1	3–0	1–1		5–2	5–0	3–1	1–2	3–1	2–0	2–1	3–0
Lierse	2–0	3–2	2–3	4–1	4–0	3–1		2–2	0–0	1–0	2–3	0–0	0–3	5–1
Lyra	1–1	2–1	1–3	5–0	2–3	0–2	0–4		1–2	2–5	3–2	4–3	1–1	3–0
KV Mechelen	5–1	0–1	1–1	1–2	1–0	4–2	2–2	2–1		3–1	4–2	1–1	0–2	0–0
Olympic Charleroi	0–1	3–3	0–3	2–2	1–4	1–1	5–2	2–2	3–3		4–0	3–1	2–3	5–1
Standard Liège	3–1	1–2	1–4	2–2	1–8	5–2	8–2	4–1	3–1	3–2		2–1	4–3	3–0
Tienen	2–0	1–4	1–7	0–1	0–0	4–2	1–2	3–0	2–1	3–3	2–1		2–7	1–2
Union SG	2–2	1–1	4–3	1–1	2–4	5–2	7–1	4–0	7–2	2–1	5–1	1–0		0–3
White Star	2–1	4–1	1–2	6–2	2–8	3–2	3–2	6–2	4–0	3–3	1–3	8–1	5–2	

Legend: Blue = home team win; Yellow = draw; Red = away team win.
