= Athletic and Running Club de Bruxelles =

Belgian football club

- Founded: 1883
- Dissolved: 1905
- League: Belgian Pro League

Athletic & Running Club de Bruxelles was a Belgian football club created in 1883. It was the only club admitted to the first division after the first season in Belgian football, in 1896. It stayed at this level until 1905 when it withdrew. The club achieved its best ranking in 1900 finishing 3rd on 6. Finally, Athletic & Running Club retired in 1909.
