= Waterschei SV Thor =

Belgian football club

Waterschei Thor
- Full name: Koninklijke Waterschei; Sportvereniging Thor Genk
- Founded: 1919
- Dissolved: 1988
Home colours

K. Waterschei S.V. Thor Genk was a Belgian football club from the city of Genk, Limburg.

It was created in 1919 as Waterschei's Sport Vereeniging Thor with Thor being the acronym of Tot Herstel Onzer Rechten ("To recover our rights"), later changed to Tot Heil Onzer Ribbenkas(t) ("For The Benefit Of Our Rib Cage"). It registered to the FA only in 1925 and received the matricule n°553. The club enjoyed a spell in the first division in the late 1950s to the early 1960s and again from 1978 to 1986. After two seasons in the second division, K. Waterschei S.V. Thor Genk merged with K.F.C. Winterslag to form K.R.C. Genk.

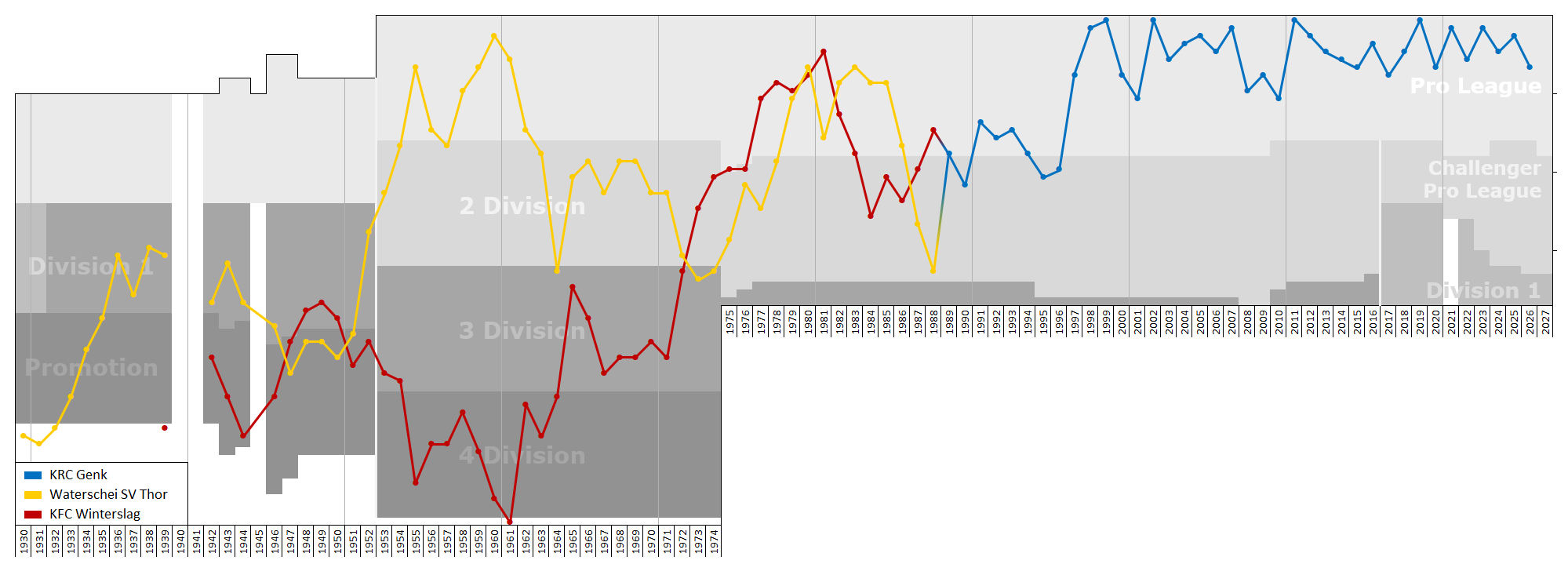
Historical league performance chart of KRC Genk and its predecessors (Waterschei SV Thor in yellow)

During the 1981–82 season, Standard Liège won the championship after a match against Waterschei had been fixed, which was uncovered two years later.

Waterschei won the Belgian Cup twice (1980 and 1982). The latter victory led to Waterschei unexpectedly reaching the semi-finals of the European Cup Winners Cup in 1982–83. After defeating PSG in the quarter-finals, Waterschei lost the first leg of the semi-final 5–1 at Pittodrie, home of the eventual winners, Aberdeen. A 1–0 victory in Genk, courtesy of Eddy Voordeckers, could not reverse the position.

Notable players were among others Lei Clijsters (international, and father of former tennis star Kim Clijsters), keeper Klaus Pudelko, striker Heinz Gründel, Icelandic striker Larus Gudmundsson, midfielder Pier(re) Janssen, Patrick Van Minsel and Dutch defender and international Adrie Van Kraaij.

== Honours ==
Belgian Cup

- Winners: 1979–80, 1981–82
- Runners-up: 1954–55

== See also ==
- Category:Waterschei SV Thor players
