= Beringen FC =

Belgian football club

- Full name: Koninklijke Beringen Football Club
- Nickname: De Beeren (the Bears)
- Founded: 1924
- Dissolved: 2002
- Ground: Mijnstadion
- Capacity: 15,000
Home colours	Away colours

Koninklijke Beringen Football Club was a Belgian football club from the municipality of Beringen, Limburg (Belgium). It existed between 1924 and 2002.

== History ==
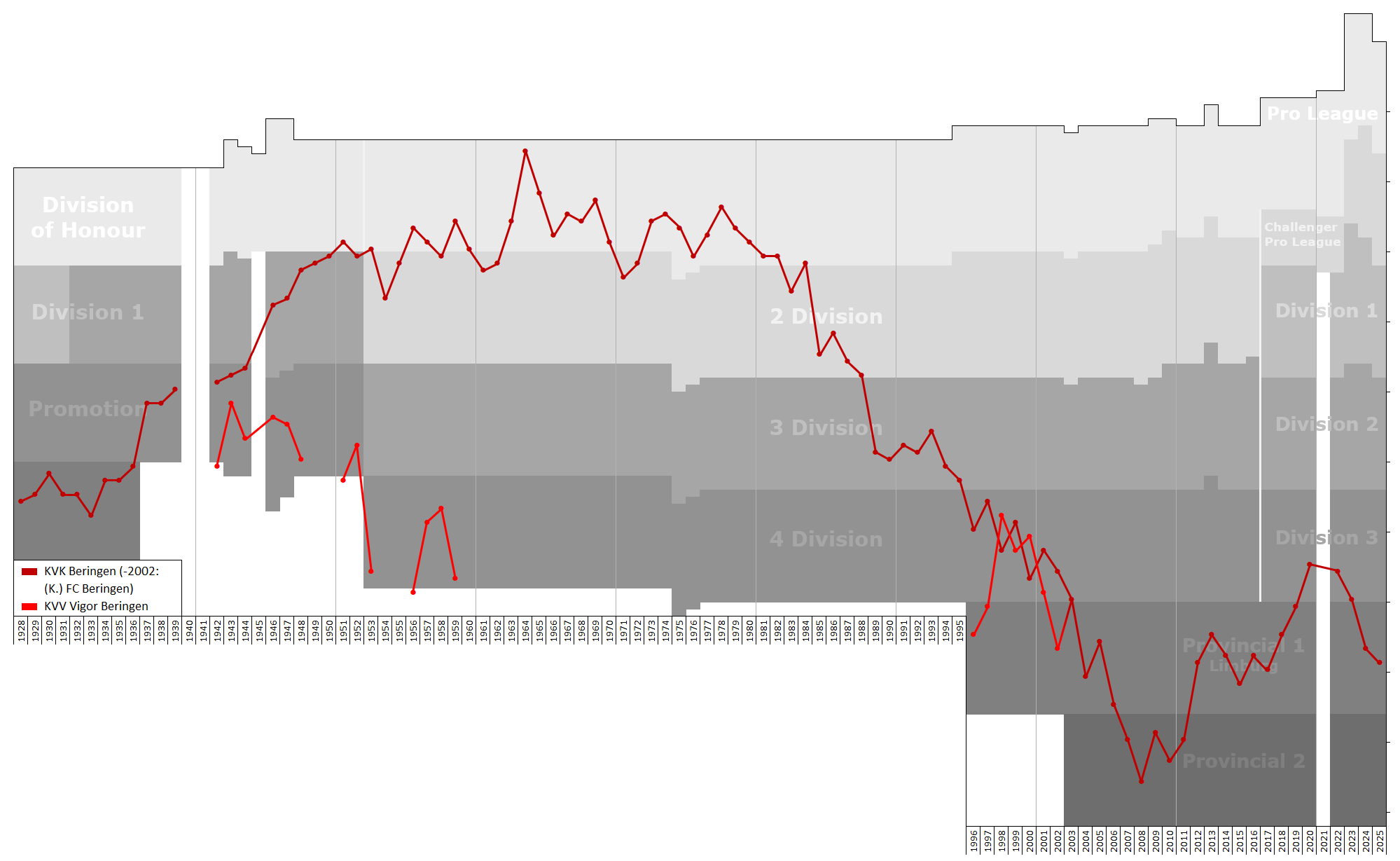
Historical chart of Beringen league performance

The club was founded in 1924 as Cercle Sportif Kleine Heide and it became a member of the Belgian Football Association in 1925 as Beeringen Football Club, matricule n°522. In 1937 it changed to Beringen F.C. and three years later the club accessed to the first division to play only one season. After that season, the name changed to K. Beringen F.C. and then to K. Beeringen F.C. one year later. In 1955 it was back at the top level for two seasons this time. The other spells of the club in the first division were 1958–1960, 1962–70 (with a 2nd place in 1964), 1972–82 and 1983–84. In 1972 the club had its last name change from K. Beeringen F.C. to K. Beringen F.C.

From 1984 to 1988 Beringen played in the second division and then at lower levels. In 2002 the matricule n°522 merged with KVV Vigor Beringen to become KVK Beringen with the matricule n°330 of Vigor. The club now plays at the same stadium as K. Beringen-Heusden-Zolder.

== Former players ==
- (Wales) Nick Deacy (1978–80) – 42 apps 10 goals for the national team.
- Van Minsel Patrick - Midfield - 46 caps - 16 goals

== Honours ==
- Belgian Second Division final round:
  - Winners (1): 1983
