= KFC Rhodienne-De Hoek =

Belgian football club

Koninklijke Football Club Rhodienne-De Hoek is a Belgian association football club based in Sint-Genesius-Rode, Flemish Brabant. The club was created in 1894 as Racing Football Club. It became a member of the Royal Belgian Football Association in 1895 as Racing Club de Bruxelles and later received the matricule n°6. It took part in the first Belgian league the same year and won 6 titles and 1 cup until the First World War.

Then, the club declined, and in 1963, it merged with White Star Woluwé A.C. to avoid bankruptcy. The new club was then called Royal Racing White. It was decided that this club would keep the matricule N°47 of White Star Woluwé. Thus to avoid that the matricule n°6 of Royal Racing Club de Bruxelles (as it was named since 1921) was erased, the club exchanged its matricule with that of K. Sport Sint-Genesius-Rode.

== History ==
=== R.R.C. de Bruxelles history (1894–1963) ===
Royal Racing Club de Bruxelles was founded in 1891 as an athletic club; the football section was also founded three years later. In 1895 the club became one of the founding members of both the Royal Belgian Football Association and the Belgian Pro League, dominating the league in its first 19 seasons, winning six Belgian titles along the way. RC de Bruxelles won the first Belgian Cup in 1912. After its first stint in the top division (interrupted by the first world war), the club was demoted to the second division in 1925. It later bounced around between the first and third tiers, never regaining its glory years.

The club suffered financially in later years, both on and off the field; it managed to play in the top tier for the last time (1954–55 season), but finished second from bottom at the end of the season (15th out of 16), never returning to the top again. Due to increasing financial hardships which were further compounded by heated discussions with the La Rhodienne management about ideas of a merger, Racing's management decided to formally merge the club with La Rhodienne (through switching matricule numbers) in 1963 (see next section).

=== K. Sport Sint-Genesius-Rode history (1927–1963) ===
In 1927, Rhodienne-Verrewinkel was officially founded as F.C. La Rhodienne and one year later the first official match was played. The team started to compete in the third regional division in 1929, where it immediately won its league. In 1936 the club reached the provincial divisions. After the War it progressed into the national divisions.

In 1963, La Rhodienne came into play to keep Racing Brussels' matricule n°6 alive. On 21 June 1963, Racing Club changed its name to Royal F.C. La Rhodienne, keeping the matricule n°6. On the next day, K. Sport Sint-Genesius-Rode (matricule n°1274) changed its name to Royal Racing Club de Bruxelles. On 23 June, the club wearing the matricule N°6, which had just been renamed to Royal FC La Rhodienne, now changed its name to K. Sport St-Genesius-Rode. The clubs had effectively changed names, so although the original Racing Club merged into R. Racing White in 1963, it was effectively the matricule n°1274 that merged, and the old matricule 6 was kept alive in a different club.

=== K.F.C. Rhodienne-Verrewinkel/Rhodienne-De Hoek history (1963–present) ===
In 1996, K.V.C. Verrewinkel (founded in 1928) merged into K. Sport St-Genesius-Rode, changing its name to K.F.C. Rhodienne-Verrewinkel. It later adopted the present name Rhodienne-De Hoek in 2010.

== Honours ==
- Belgian First Division
  - Champions (6): 1896–97, 1899–1900, 1900–01, 1901–02, 1902–03, 1907–08
- Belgian Cup
  - Winners (1): 1911–12
- Belgian Second Division
  - Winners (2): 1925–26, 1941–42
- Coupe Van der Straeten Ponthoz
  - Winners (3): 1903, 1904, 1906
  - Runner-up (2): 1901, 1905
- Challenge International du Nord
  - Winners (2): 1903, 1908
- Coupe Jean Dupuich
  - Winners (4): 1908, 1920, 1922, (Note: They won the 1920 and 1922 editions as part of a selection that included players from Léopold FC.) 1924 (Note: As part of a selection that included players from two other Belgian clubs, Royale Uccle Sport, and RSC Anderlecht.)
