= 1958–59 in Belgian football =

Football in Belgium
- Season: 1958–59

The 1958–59 season was the 56th season of competitive football in Belgium. RSC Anderlechtois won their 8th Division I title. Standard Liège entered the 1958–59 European Champion Clubs' Cup as Belgian title holder and became the first Belgian club to win a match in European competitions. They eventually reached the quarter-finals. RU Saint-Gilloise entered the 1958–60 Inter-Cities Fairs Cup and reached the semifinals. The Belgium national football team played 7 friendly games (3 draws, 4 losses).

== Overview ==
At the end of the season, RRC Tournaisien and R Tilleur FC were relegated to Division II and were replaced by R Daring Club de Bruxelles and RFC Brugeois from Division II.
The bottom 2 clubs in Division II (RFC Renaisien and K Boom FC) were relegated to Division III, to be replaced by RRC de Bruxelles and K Olse Merksem) from Division III.
The bottom 2 clubs of each Division III league (K. Tongeren SC, RCS La Forestoise, RC Lokeren and SCUP Jette) were relegated to Promotion, to be replaced by R Crossing FC Ganshoren, US Centre, U Basse-Sambre-Auvelais and K Hasseltse VV from Promotion.

== National team ==
Date	Venue	Opponents	Score*	Comp	Belgium scorers
September 28, 1958	Bosuilstadion, Antwerp (H)	The Netherlands	2-3	F	Pierre Hanon, André Piters
October 26, 1958	Heysel Stadium, Brussels (H)	Turkey	1-1	F	André Piters
November 23, 1958	Nepstadion, Budapest (A)	Hungary	1-3	F	Karel Mallants
March 1, 1959	Stade Olympique, Colombes (A)	France	2-2	F	Martin Lippens, André Piters
April 19, 1959	Olympic Stadium, Amsterdam (A)	The Netherlands	2-2	F	Victor Wégria, Fernand Goyvaerts
May 24, 1959	Heysel Stadium, Brussels (H)	Austria	0-2	F
June 14, 1959	Praterstadion, Vienna (A)	Austria	2-4	F	Godfried Vandenboer, Henri Coppens

* Belgium score given first

Key

- H = Home match
- A = Away match
- N = On neutral ground
- F = Friendly
- o.g. = own goal

== European competitions ==
Standard Liège became the first Belgian club to win a match in European competition when they beat Hearts of Scotland on September 3, 1958 (5-1), in the first round of the 1958–59 European Champion Clubs' Cup. In spite of their loss in the second leg (2-1), Standard advanced to the second round, where they defeated Sporting of Portugal (wins 2–3 away and 3–0 at home). In the quarter-finals, Standard was eliminated by Stade Reims of France (win 2–0 at home and defeat 3–0 away).

RU Saint-Gilloise entered the 1958–60 Inter-Cities Fairs Cup. They defeated a team from Leipzig of Germany in the first round (win 6–1 at home and defeat 1–0 away). In the quarter-finals, RU Saint-Gilloise eliminated AS Roma of Italy with a 2–0 home win followed by a 1–1 draw in Roma. The semifinals were played during the 1959–60 season. The Belgian lost to Birmingham City (two losses by 2–4).

== Honours ==
Competition	Winner
Division I	RSC Anderlechtois
Division II	R Daring Club de Bruxelles
Division III	RRC de Bruxelles and K Olse Merksem
Promotion	R Crossing FC Ganshoren, US Centre, U Basse-Sambre-Auvelais and K Hasseltse VV

== Final league tables ==
=== Premier Division ===
- 1958-59 Top scorer: Victor Wégria (RFC Liégeois) with 26 goals.
- 1958 Golden Shoe: Roland Storme (ARA La Gantoise)
