= 1959–60 in Belgian football =

Football in Belgium
- Season: 1959–60

The 1959–60 season was the 57th season of competitive football in Belgium. K Lierse SK won their 3rd Division I title. RSC Anderlechtois entered the 1959–60 European Champion Clubs' Cup as Belgian title holder and RU Saint-Gilloise lost the semifinals of the running 1958–60 Inter-Cities Fairs Cup. The Belgium national football team played 6 friendly games (3 wins, 1 draw and 2 losses).

== Overview ==
At the end of the season, R Berchem Sport and K Beringen FC were relegated to Division II and were replaced in Division I by KSC Eendracht Aalst and runner-up VV Patro Eisden from Division II.
The bottom 2 clubs in Division II (KRC Mechelen and RFC Sérésien) were relegated to Division III while both Division III winners (KFC Turnhout and UR Namur) were promoted to Division II.
The bottom 2 clubs of each Division III league (SK Beveren-Waas, RCS Schaerbeek, Voorwaarts Tienen and R Albert Elisabeth Club Mons) were relegated to Promotion, to be replaced by R Entente Sportive Jamboise, K Wezel Sport FC, KSK Roeselare and K Tubantia FC from Promotion.

== National team ==
Date	Venue	Opponents	Score*	Comp	Belgium scorers
October 4, 1959	Feijenoord Stadion, Rotterdam (A)	The Netherlands	1-9	F	Michel Delire
February 28, 1960	Heysel Stadium, Brussels (H)	France	1-0	F	André Piters
March 27, 1960	Heysel Stadium, Brussels (H)	Switzerland	3-1	F	Henri Dirickx, Jean Jadot, Léon Ritzen
April 13, 1960	Heysel Stadium, Brussels (H)	Chile	1-1	F	Paul Vandenberg
April 24, 1960	Bosuilstadion, Antwerp (H)	The Netherlands	2-1	F	Martin Lippens, André Piters
May 22, 1960	Vasil Levski National Stadium, Sofia (A)	Bulgaria	1-4	F	André Piters

* Belgium score given first

Key

- H = Home match
- A = Away match
- N = On neutral ground
- F = Friendly
- o.g. = own goal

== European competitions ==
RSC Anderlechtois lost in the first round of the 1959–60 European Champion Clubs' Cup to Rangers FC of Scotland (loss 5-2 away and 0-2 at home). RU Saint-Gilloise continued their 1958–60 Inter-Cities Fairs Cup campaign by losing to Birmingham City in the semifinals (two losses by 2-4).

== Honours ==
Competition	Winner
Division I	K Lierse SK
Division II	KSC Eendracht Aalst
Division III	KFC Turnhout and UR Namur
Promotion	R Entente Sportive Jamboise, K Wezel Sport FC, KSK Roeselare and K Tubantia FC

== Final league tables ==
=== Premier Division ===
- 1959-60 Top scorer: Victor Wégria (RFC Liégeois) with 21 goals.
- 1959 Golden Shoe: Lucien Olieslagers (K Lierse SK)
