= 1961–62 in Belgian football =

Football in Belgium
- Season: 1961–62

The 1961–62 season was the 59th season of competitive football in Belgium. RCS Anderlechtois won their 9th Division I title. Standard Liège entered the 1961–62 European Champion Clubs' Cup as Belgian title holder and became the first Belgian club to reach the semifinals of this competition. RU Saint-Gilloise entered the 1961–62 Inter-Cities Fairs Cup. The Belgium national football team finished their unsuccessful 1962 FIFA World Cup qualification campaign with a loss and played 7 friendly matches (5 wins, 2 losses).

== Overview ==
At the end of the season, K Waterschei SV Thor Genk and KSC Eendracht Aalst were relegated to Division II and were replaced in Division I by R Berchem Sport and K Beringen FC from Division II.
The bottom 2 clubs in Division II (K Sint-Niklaasse SK and RRC Tournaisien) were relegated to Division III, to be replaced by KRC Mechelen and R Crossing Club Molenbeek from Division III.
The bottom club of each Division III league (RUS Tournaisienne, Kontich FC, R Fléron FC and Aarschot Sport) were relegated to the Promotion, to be replaced by VC Zwevegem Sport, FC Vigor Hamme, R Stade Waremmien FC and FC Eendracht Houthalen from Promotion.

== National team ==
Date	Venue	Opponents	Score*	Comp	Belgium scorers
October 4, 1961	Heysel Stadium, Brussels (H)	Sweden	0-2	WCQ
October 18, 1961	Heysel Stadium, Brussels (H)	France	3-0	F	Pierre Hanon, Paul Vandenberg, Roger Claessen
November 12, 1961	Olympic Stadium, Amsterdam (A)	The Netherlands	4-0	F	Roger Claessen (2), Paul Vandenberg, Paul Van Himst
December 24, 1961	Heysel Stadium, Brussels (H)	Bulgaria	4-0	F	Jacques Stockman, Armand Jurion, Paul Van Himst (2)
April 1, 1962	Bosuilstadion, Antwerp (H)	The Netherlands	3-1	F	Armand Jurion, Paul Vandenberg (2)
May 13, 1962	Heysel Stadium, Brussels (H)	Italy	1-3	F	Paul Van Himst
May 17, 1962	Estádio José Alvalade, Lisbon (A)	Portugal	2-1	F	Jacques Stockman, Armand Jurion
May 23, 1962	10th-Anniversary Stadium, Warsaw (A)	Poland	0-2	F

* Belgium score given first

Key

- H = Home match
- A = Away match
- N = On neutral ground
- F = Friendly
- WCQ = World Cup qualification
- o.g. = own goal

== European competitions ==
Standard Liège qualified for the first round of the 1961–62 European Champion Clubs' Cup by defeating Fredrikstad FK of Norway (wins 2-1 at home and 0-2 away) in the preliminary round. They then eliminated successively FC Haka of Finland (wins 5-1 at home and 0-2 away) and Rangers of Scotland (win 4-1 at home and defeat 2-0 away) to reach the semifinals. At this stage of the competition, Standard lost to Real Madrid (losses 4-0 away and 0-2 at home).

RU Saint-Gilloise lost in the first round of the 1961–62 Inter-Cities Fairs Cup to Hearts of Scotland (losses 1-3 at home and defeat 2-0 away).

== Honours ==
Competition	Winner
Division I	RSC Anderlechtois
Division II	R Berchem Sport
Division III	KRC Mechelen and R Crossing Club Molenbeek
Promotion	VC Zwevegem Sport, FC Vigor Hamme, R Stade Waremmien FC and FC Eendracht Houthalen

== Final league tables ==
=== Premier Division ===
- 1961-62 Top scorer: Jacques Stockman (RSC Anderlechtois) with 29 goals.
- 1961 Golden Shoe: Paul Van Himst (RSC Anderlechtois)
