= Henri Meert =

Belgian footballer

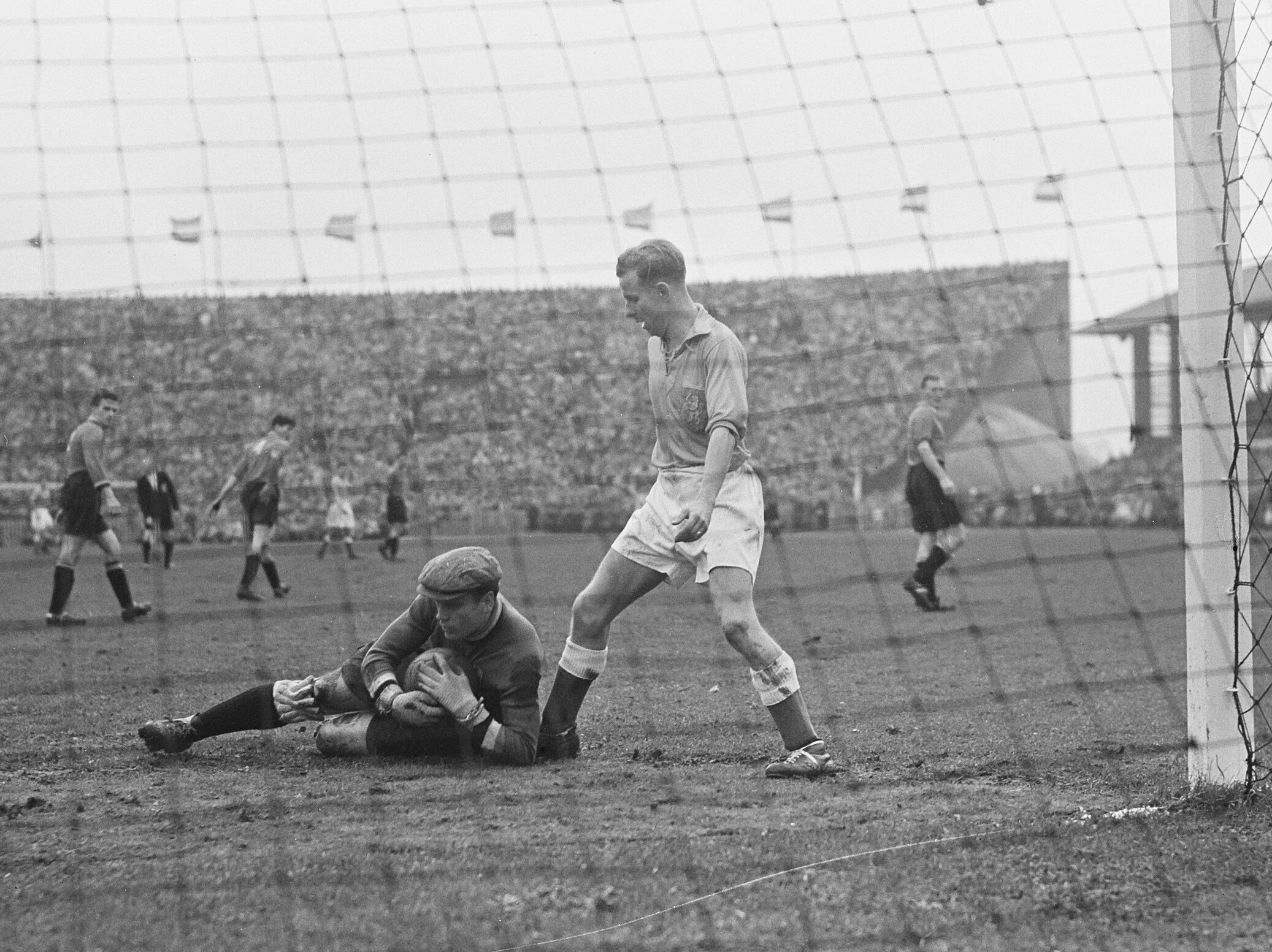
- Henri Meert in action for Belgium, 1950

Personal information
- Date of birth: 27 August 1920
- Place of birth: Schaerbeek, Brussels, Belgium
- Date of death: 19 May 2006 (aged 85)
- Place of death: Anderlecht, Brussels, Belgium
- Position: Goalkeeper

Youth career
- 1938–1942: Anderlecht

Senior career*
Years	Team	Apps	(Gls)
1942–1960	Anderlecht	343	(1)

International career
1944–1957	Belgium	33	(0)
- * Club domestic league appearances and goals

Henri "Rie" Meert (27 August 1920 in Schaerbeek, Belgium – 19 May 2006 in Anderlecht) was a Belgian international football player.

He was the goalkeeper of Sporting Anderlecht in the entire 1950s; eight times he took home the Belgian Championship with the Mauves. He played 343 official matches (among which 312 in the first division) for the club and appeared 33 times in the national selection.

== Honours ==
Anderlecht

- Belgian First Division: 1946–47, 1948–49, 1949–50, 1950–51, 1953–54, 1954–55, 1955–56, 1958–59

National team

- 33 selections for the Belgium national team
