= Pierre Hanon =

Belgian footballer

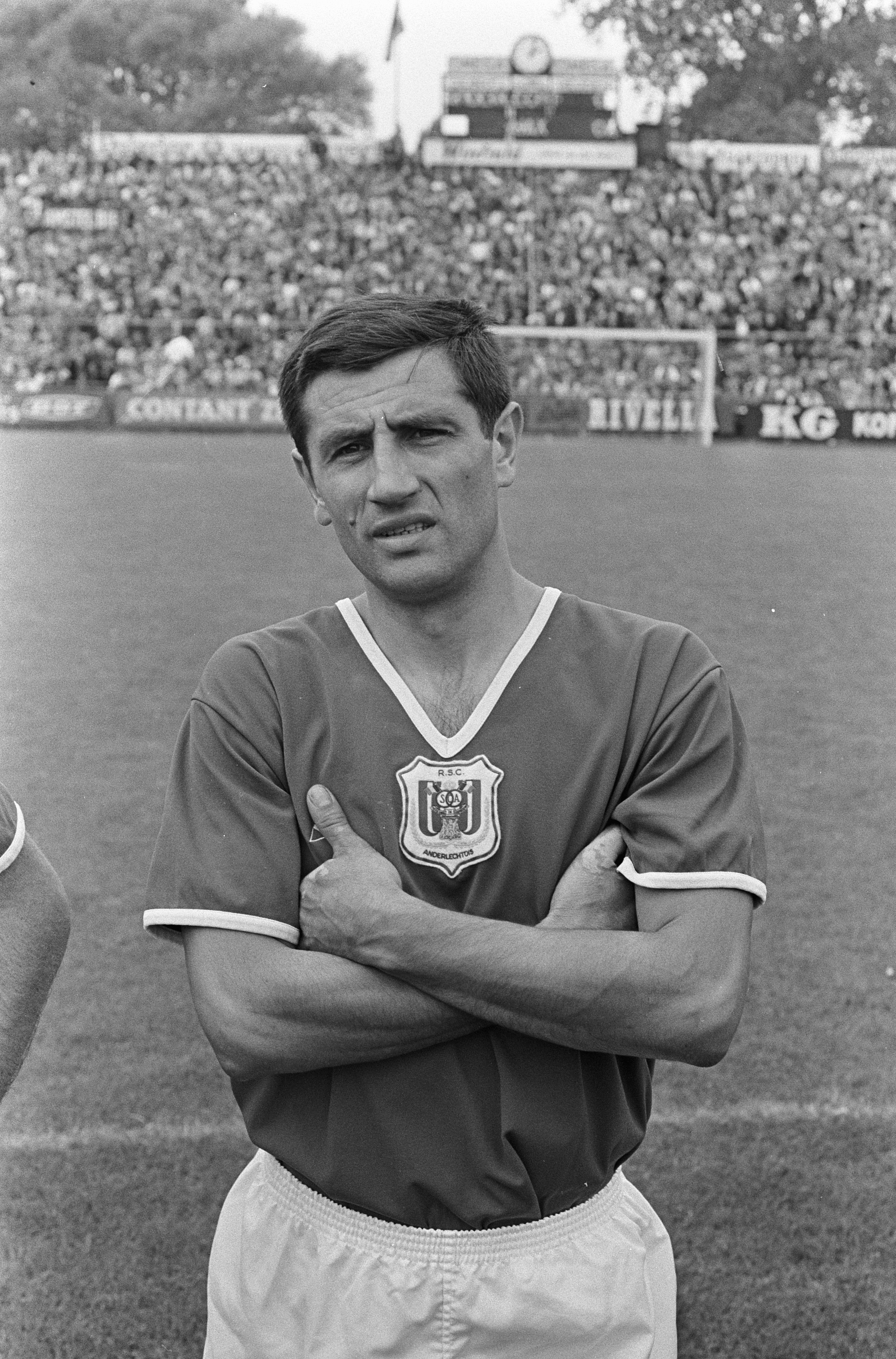
- Hanon with Anderlecht in 1967

Personal information
- Full name: Pierre Hanon
- Date of birth: 29 December 1936 (age 89)
- Place of birth: Brussels, Belgium
- Date of death: 13 October 2017 (aged 80)
- Positions: Midfielder; defender

Youth career
- 1945–1954: Anderlecht

Senior career*
Years	Team	Apps	(Gls)
1954–1970	Anderlecht	353	(31)
1970–1973	Cercle Brugge	77	(11)
1973–1974	RAEC Mons	28	(7)
Total		458	(49)

International career
1960–1974	Belgium U-19	14	(0)
1958-1969	Belgium	48	(3)

Managerial career
- 1973-75: RAEC Mons
- * Club domestic league appearances and goals

Pierre Hanon (29 December 1936 – 13 October 2017) was a Belgian footballer from Brussels who played mainly for R.S.C. Anderlecht and the national team.

== Club career ==
Hanon signed to Anderlecht in 1945 as a young player. He was first called to the first team in 1954, but he lost his place after a poor performance. A season later, he played in the 2–0 victory to rivals Standard Liège, but was sent to the B team again for the rest of the competition. His third match with the team was in Hungary for the first European game in Anderlecht history. Hanon was called by the manager the day of the match because of Susse Deglas's injury, while he was doing his military service. So he left the barracks without eating to join the team, and though made a good match.

Hanon would eventually play 404 games for Anderlecht and score 41 times. He became champion nine times with the club. To this day, Hanon and Jef Jurion are the only players who could achieve that record.

Used as a right winger, Hanon became a libero at the end of his Anderlecht career, and then at Cercle Brugge.

== International career ==
Pierre Hanon played in the match Belgium-Netherlands in 1964 with 10 fellows from the Anderlecht team after the substitution of goalkeeper Delhasse by Jean-Marie Trappeniers. In total, Hanon collected 48 caps.

== Honours and awards ==
=== Player ===
Anderlecht

- Belgian First Division: 1954–55, 1955–56, 1958–59, 1961–62, 1963–64, 1964–65, 1965–66, 1966–67, 1967–68
- Belgian Cup: 1964–65
- Tournoi de Paris: 1964, 1966
- Inter-Cities Fairs Cup runner-up: 1969–70
