= Vanden Stock =

Vanden Stock is a surname. Notable people with the surname include:

- Constant Vanden Stock (1914–2008), Belgian footballer and manager
  - Constant Vanden Stock Stadium, football stadium in Brussels, Belgium
- Roger Vanden Stock (born 1942), Belgian footballer
