= Jacques Stockman =

Belgian footballer

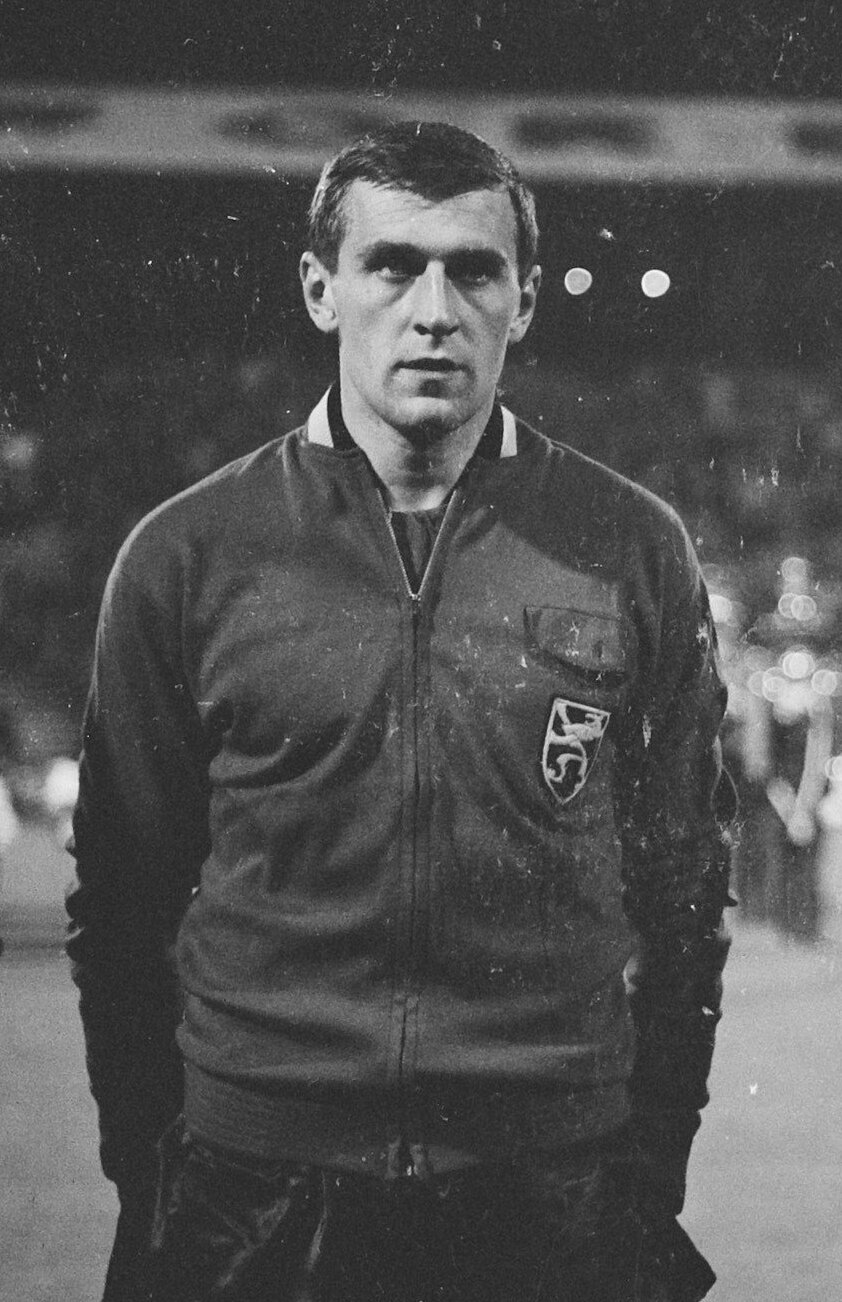
- Stockman for Belgium in 1964

Personal information
- Date of birth: 8 October 1938
- Place of birth: Ronse, Belgium
- Date of death: 4 May 2013 (aged 74)
- Place of death: Waregem, Belgium
- Position: Striker

Senior career*
Years	Team	Apps	(Gls)
1956–1957	R.F.C. Renaisien		
1957–1966	Anderlecht	236	(142)
1966–1967	R.F.C. de Liège		
1967–1972	K.S.V. Waregem		
1972–1973	Anderlecht	10	(0)

International career
1958–1967	Belgium	32	(13)

Managerial career
- 1973–1975: Mouscron
- 1985–1988: Mouscron
- * Club domestic league appearances and goals

Jacques "Jacky" Stockman (8 October 1938 – 4 May 2013) was a Belgian football player who played as a striker. He played most of his career for R.S.C. Anderlecht and was selected 32 times for Belgium.

== Club career ==
Stockman started with the youth of FC Ronse but was soon discovered by the big clubs. He eventually chose R.S.C. Anderlecht, where he made his debut in the A-team in 1957. Stockman played 30 games that season and scored 13 goals. A season later, Anderlecht became national champions. In 1962, Stockman became top scorer of the Belgian first division with 29 goals.

He was clearly ready for a big European team but simply stayed in his home country, like so many players of the time. In 1966, at the age of 28, he was sold by Anderlecht to Club de Liège despite interest from AS Roma. The easy-scoring striker also continued to play well at Liège but could not win a single trophy with the club. From 1967, he played for several years at KSV Waregem, and in 1972 Stockman returned to Anderlecht. Because there were other strikers there at the time, such as Paul Van Himst, he hardly got to play. Aged 35, Stockman ended his professional football career. In total, he played 411 games in the highest division and scored 184 goals.

Stockman was nicknamed Zorro after he scored a late goal with Anderlecht against Bologna FC in the second leg of the 1964–65 European Cup first round, enforcing a replay at the Camp Nou. The song "Zorro est arrivé" by French singer Henri Salvador was popular at the time.

== International career ==
Stockman played a total of 32 matches for Belgium, scoring 13 goals.

He played in the Belgium-Netherlands match in 1964 with 10 fellows from the Anderlecht team after the substitution of goalkeeper Guy Delhasse by Jean-Marie Trappeniers.

Aged 74, Jacques Stockman died on 4 May 2013.

== Honours ==
=== Club ===
Anderlecht

- Belgian First Division: 1957–58, 1961–62, 1963–64, 1964–65, 1965–66
- Belgian Cup: 1964–65, 1972–73
- Belgian League Cup: 1973
- Tournoi de Paris: 1964, 1966

=== Individual ===
- Belgian First Division top scorer: 1961-62 (29 goals)
