= Armand Jurion =

Belgian footballer

Jef Jurion
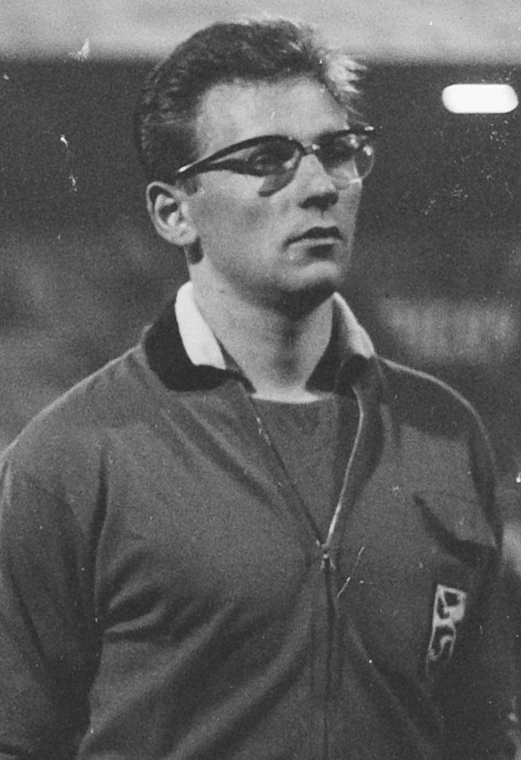
- Jurion in 1964

Personal information
- Full name: Joseph Armand Jurion
- Date of birth: 24 February 1937 (age 89)
- Place of birth: Sint-Pieters-Leeuw, Belgium
- Position: Winger

Senior career*
Years	Team	Apps	(Gls)
1953–1968	Anderlecht	390	(73)
1968–1971	Gent	85	(8)
1971–1974	Lokeren	73	(6)
Total		448	(87)

International career
1955–1967	Belgium	64	(9)

Managerial career
- 1974–1975: KSK Beveren
- 1975–1976: La Louvière
- * Club domestic league appearances and goals

Armand Joseph Jurion (born 24 February 1937), nicknamed Jef, is a Belgian former professional footballer who played for the Belgium national team from 1955 to 1967. Jurion spent most of his club career at R.S.C. Anderlecht where he won nine championship titles and one Cup and was awarded two Golden Shoes. He played in the match Belgium-Netherlands in 1964 with ten teammates from the Anderlecht team after the substitution of goalkeeper Delhasse by Jean-Marie Trappeniers.

== Career ==
"Jef" began to play at Ruisbroek, Flemish Brabant and earned an early interest by Brussels giants Union and Racing White, but he finally signed with Anderlecht. In November 1954, he played his debut game in the first team of Anderlecht against Olympic Charleroi (won 4–2) as a right winger. Jurion remained in the first team until he left for Gent in 1967, to work as a player-coach. His early breakthrough permitted him to play the first European game of Anderlecht, against Hungarian side Vörös Lobogó (currently MTK) in 1955.

Jurion achieved international fame after a memorable goal against Real Madrid in 1962 (a 1–0 win) which qualified Anderlecht for the second round of the Champions Cup after the 3–3 draw at Bernabéu. After this goal, he received the nickname of "Mister Europe". He began his international career in 1955 against France. During his 64 appearances, he played at seven different positions and scored nine times.

He is also remembered as one of very few notable football players, if not the only one, who constantly wore glasses during games.

Jurion then successively coached KSC Lokeren, KSK Beveren and La Louvière.

== Honours ==
Anderlecht

- Belgian First Division: 1954–55, 1955–56, 1958–59, 1961–62, 1963–64, 1964–65, 1965–66, 1966–67, 1967–68
- Belgian Cup: 1964–65; runner-up 1965–66

Individual

- Belgian Golden Shoe: 1957, 1962
- Ballon d'Or 5th place: 1962
- Ballon d'Or nominations: 1963, 1964
