= Martin Lippens =

Belgian footballer

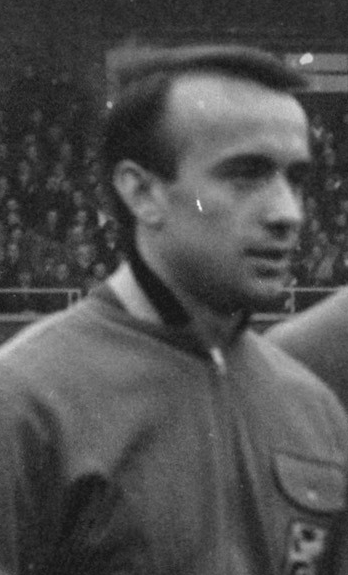
- Lippens in 1961

Personal information
- Full name: Martinus Lippens
- Date of birth: 8 October 1934
- Place of birth: Belgium
- Date of death: 2 November 2016 (aged 82)
- Place of death: Anderlecht, Brussels, Belgium
- Position: Midfielder

Senior career*
Years	Team	Apps	(Gls)
1954–1966	Anderlecht	232	(52)

International career
1955	Belgium U-19	1	(0)
1957–1963	Belgium	33	(2)

Managerial career
- 1966–1967: VW Hamme
- 1992: Sint-Truiden
- 1994: RWDM
- * Club domestic league appearances and goals

Martinus "Martin" Lippens (8 October 1934 – 2 November 2016) was a Belgian international football player and trainer who only played for one club, Sporting Anderlecht, as a midfielder.

He played for Anderlecht in the entire 1950s; seven times he took home the Belgian Championship with the Mauves, and once he also won the Belgian Cup. He played 232 official matches in the first division for that club, and appeared 33 times in the national selection. After his player career was head coach for different clubs for short periods, but mainly worked as youth trainer or assistant-coach.

== Player palmares ==
=== Club career ===
Anderlecht

- Belgian First Division (7): 1954–55, 1955–56, 1958–59, 1961–62, 1963–64, 1964–65, 1965–66
- Belgian Cup (1): 1964–65

=== International career ===
- 33 selections for the Belgium national team and 2 goals
