= 1949–50 Belgian First Division =

47th season of top-tier football in Belgium

Belgian First Division
- Season: 1949–50

Statistics of Belgian First Division in the 1949–50 season.

== Overview ==
Location of teams in Belgian First Division 1949–50

It was contested by 16 teams, and R.S.C. Anderlecht won the championship.

== League standings ==
Pos	Team	Pld	W	D	L	GF	GA	GD	Pts	Relegation
1	R.S.C. Anderlecht	30	19	7	4	75	44	+31	45	
2	K Berchem Sport	30	17	6	7	68	48	+20	40	
3	K.R.C. Mechelen	30	17	4	9	76	53	+23	38	
4	K.A.A. Gent	30	15	7	8	55	38	+17	37	
5	KV Mechelen	30	14	8	8	67	46	+21	36	
6	Royal Antwerp FC	30	14	8	8	68	49	+19	36	
7	R.F.C. de Liège	30	13	7	10	74	47	+27	33	
8	R.O.C. de Charleroi-Marchienne	30	11	10	9	53	57	−4	32	
9	R.R.C. Bruxelles	30	11	8	11	51	61	−10	30	
10	Beerschot	30	12	6	12	62	62	0	30	
11	R. Charleroi S.C.	30	7	9	14	44	73	−29	23	
12	Tilleur FC	30	4	14	12	33	44	−11	22	
13	Standard Liège	30	8	6	16	51	69	−18	22	
14	Club Brugge K.V.	30	9	4	17	43	60	−17	22	
15	K. Lyra	30	7	5	18	51	81	−30	19	Relegated to Division I
16	Stade Louvain	30	4	7	19	46	85	−39	15	Relegated to Division I

== Results ==
Home \ Away	AND	ANT	BEE	BRC	CLU	RCB	CHA	GNT	FCL	LOU	LYR	KVM	OLY	RCM	STA	TIL
Anderlecht		2–2	4–2	2–0	2–1	2–2	5–0	1–1	2–0	3–0	2–0	1–4	0–1	2–0	2–1	2–2
Antwerp	2–2		2–1	1–0	4–1	0–2	5–3	3–0	1–1	2–2	6–2	1–3	5–1	0–1	2–0	2–1
Beerschot	4–5	0–0		1–4	2–1	3–1	4–2	1–1	4–1	2–0	2–0	4–2	1–1	4–5	1–2	3–2
Berchem	3–3	2–4	1–1		2–2	2–1	4–0	5–3	2–0	4–1	3–0	2–1	3–2	4–2	3–1	1–0
Club Brugge	0–1	3–0	1–2	0–1		1–2	2–1	0–1	5–2	1–1	1–2	3–2	1–3	2–3	1–0	1–0
Racing Bruxelles	0–5	2–4	2–0	1–0	1–1		1–1	1–1	0–1	3–2	7–5	2–2	4–2	1–3	2–1	0–0
Charleroi	0–2	5–5	5–3	2–3	2–0	1–0		0–2	1–1	3–1	3–1	0–0	2–2	1–3	4–3	1–1
La Gantoise	1–1	5–3	3–0	0–1	1–2	6–2	1–0		5–2	3–3	1–2	1–1	4–0	1–0	0–0	2–1
Liège	4–0	0–0	5–0	3–1	6–1	0–2	2–0	1–3		4–1	12–1	1–1	1–1	1–2	4–2	1–0
Stade Louvain	2–3	1–4	3–1	2–5	3–2	0–1	1–1	0–1	1–5		4–3	1–4	3–3	1–3	4–2	0–0
Lyra	1–2	1–1	1–4	3–3	0–3	3–4	8–0	0–3	3–1	3–1		2–1	0–2	0–4	0–3	2–2
KV Mechelen	2–3	4–1	3–1	0–0	2–2	2–0	5–0	0–1	1–5	5–1	1–0		4–2	1–0	5–1	2–0
Olympic Charleroi	2–5	1–6	1–4	1–3	5–1	5–1	1–1	3–1	0–0	2–2	1–1	2–1		3–1	2–1	0–0
K.R.C. Mechelen	2–1	1–0	4–4	7–3	5–1	4–2	5–1	1–2	3–2	5–2	1–1	4–4	0–1		2–2	2–4
Standard Liège	3–6	2–1	0–0	3–2	2–0	3–3	1–3	1–0	3–7	4–1	3–2	2–3	1–3	1–3		1–1
Tilleur	2–4	0–1	0–3	1–1	1–3	1–1	1–1	3–1	1–1	4–1	0–3	2–2	0–0	1–0	2–2	

Legend: Blue = home team win; Yellow = draw; Red = away team win.
