= 1946–47 Belgian First Division =

44th season of top-tier football in Belgium

Belgian First Division
- Season: 1946–47

Statistics of Belgian First Division in the 1946–47 season.

== Overview ==
Location of teams in Belgian First Division 1946–47

It was contested by 19 teams, and R.S.C. Anderlecht won the championship.

At the end of the season, the number of clubs was reduced from 19 back to 16 for the following season.

== League standings ==
Pos	Team	Pld	W	D	L	GF	GA	GD	Pts	Relegation
1	R.S.C. Anderlecht	36	21	8	7	112	59	+53	50	
2	R.O.C. de Charleroi-Marchienne	36	18	12	6	78	49	+29	48	
3	KV Mechelen	36	17	11	8	89	49	+40	45	
4	Royal Antwerp FC	36	19	7	10	72	51	+21	45	
5	R.R.C. Bruxelles	36	16	11	9	82	69	+13	43	
6	K Berchem Sport	36	17	8	11	89	82	+7	42	
7	R.F.C. de Liège	36	19	3	14	98	64	+34	41	
8	K. Lyra	36	13	10	13	64	70	−6	36	
9	Standard Liège	36	14	8	14	76	73	+3	36	
10	Lierse S.K.	36	13	9	14	80	90	−10	35	
11	K.A.A. Gent	35	14	6	15	64	76	−12	34	
12	Beerschot	36	13	6	17	66	65	+1	32	
13	Royale Union Saint-Gilloise	36	13	6	17	86	95	−9	32	
14	K Boom FC	36	13	6	17	53	66	−13	32	
15	CS La Forestoise	36	10	9	17	55	80	−25	29	Relegated to Division I
16	White Star	36	9	10	17	60	84	−24	28	Relegated to Division I
17	Eendracht Alost	36	10	8	18	66	81	−15	28	Relegated to Division I
18	Sint-Niklase	36	11	4	21	53	102	−49	26	Relegated to Division I
19	Club Brugge K.V.	36	7	8	21	56	94	−38	22	Relegated to Division I

== Results ==
Home \ Away	AAL	AND	ANT	BEE	BRC	BOO	CLU	RCB	FOR	GNT	FCL	LIE	LYR	MEC	OLY	STA	USG	SNI	WST
Eendracht Alost		1–3	1–3	4–6	1–2	4–1	0–0	2–2	0–3	2–0	5–3	0–2	1–1	3–2	2–3	4–5	1–1	1–3	3–2
Anderlecht	3–3		3–2	3–2	4–2	3–1	7–1	4–5	2–2	6–2	3–1	2–3	3–0	3–3	3–0	1–1	6–0	7–0	4–4
Antwerp	1–1	2–1		2–1	2–1	5–1	2–1	2–2	0–1	1–0	3–0	1–1	1–4	1–1	1–3	3–1	1–2	2–0	1–2
Beerschot	4–2	1–4	0–0		1–1	3–0	3–2	1–1	3–0	1–2	0–1	3–5	5–0	0–3	2–0	4–1	1–4	1–0	2–0
Berchem	2–1	0–4	5–1	3–2		4–0	5–0	3–2	0–0	7–1	2–1	5–3	2–6	1–1	6–4	4–3	4–2	3–1	1–2
Boom	6–0	3–2	1–1	0–2	0–4		6–1	0–1	2–2	1–3	1–0	0–1	1–0	1–1	0–0	3–2	3–0	1–2	2–1
Club Brugge	1–1	1–2	1–5	2–0	2–3	2–4		3–2	4–1	1–0	1–5	6–0	4–1	2–0	0–0	0–0	4–4	0–3	3–3
Racing Bruxelles	3–5	0–0	4–3	2–2	4–4	4–0	1–0		3–2	1–0	2–2	6–2	1–0	1–1	3–2	2–2	0–2	3–1	1–3
La Forestoise	1–0	1–4	1–3	1–0	5–1	1–0	1–1	1–3		5–3	3–0	3–4	0–0	2–2	1–1	3–1	4–2	1–3	0–2
La Gantoise	3–2	0–4	0–2	3–2	4–0	2–1	1–1	3–3	3–1		2–1	0–0	2–1	2–2	1–1	4–0	5–1	2–1	6–1
Liège	3–2	2–1	3–1	2–4	1–1	3–0	6–3	0–2	3–1	2–1		6–1	3–1	5–0	0–1	2–1	6–3	10–0	8–1
Lierse	1–1	1–2	0–3	1–2	3–3	2–2	3–1	3–3	2–2	5–1	6–1		2–5	1–5	2–1	2–2	6–2	8–0	3–2
Lyra	2–0	4–1	0–3	2–1	2–2	0–2	2–1	2–4	3–1	1–3	4–2	2–2		2–2	1–1	0–0	5–2	1–1	1–0
Mechelen	0–2	1–1	0–2	1–1	5–0	1–2	3–1	1–0	3–0	5–0	1–2	2–1	5–0		0–0	5–2	1–0	5–0	9–2
Olympic Charleroi	3–1	3–1	4–1	3–1	5–1	1–1	6–3	1–1	5–1	1–0	2–1	4–1	3–3	1–1		4–0	1–1	2–1	2–1
Standard Liège	3–5	1–2	1–3	1–0	3–2	3–0	3–0	3–1	4–2	5–0	1–4	4–1	2–2	0–1	3–1		4–3	3–0	1–1
Union SG	0–2	2–5	0–2	6–3	4–1	3–1	6–1	5–2	6–0	4–2	2–2	5–0	3–0	1–5	2–3	1–6		2–2	4–3
Sint-Niklase	2–1	1–5	2–4	1–1	1–1	1–3	2–1	2–1	6–1	3–2	0–6	3–1	3–4	0–6	1–5	2–3	2–0		2–3
White Star	1–2	3–3	2–2	2–1	1–3	1–3	3–1	1–2	1–1	1–1	2–1	0–1	1–2	3–4	1–1	1–1	1–1	2–1	

Legend: Blue = home team win; Yellow = draw; Red = away team win.
