= Michel Delire =

Belgian footballer

Personal information
- Date of birth: 6 August 1933
- Place of birth: Châtelet, Belgium
- Date of death: 3 April 2006 (aged 72)
- Position: Midfielder

International career
| Years | Team | Apps | (Gls) |
| 1957–1960 | Belgium | 5 | (1) |

Michel Delire (6 August 1933 – 3 April 2006) was a Belgian footballer. He played in five matches for the Belgium national football team from 1957 to 1960.
