= Roger Vanden Stock =

Roger Vanden Stock (born 13 August 1942) is the former president of Anderlecht, a Belgian football club, a post he held between 1996 and 2018.
