= RSC Anderlecht =

Belgian football club, based in Brussels

Anderlecht
- Full name: Royal Sporting Club Anderlecht
- Nicknames: Purple & White, Sporting (Dutch: Paars-wit; French: Les Mauve et Blanc)
- Short name: RSCA
- Founded: 27 May 1908; 118 years ago
- Ground: Constant Vanden Stock – Lotto Park
- Capacity: 22,500
- Chairman: Michael Verschueren
- Manager: Vítor Bruno
- League: Belgian Pro League
- 2025–26: Belgian Pro League, 4th of 16
- Website: rsca.be
Home colours	Away colours

Royal Sporting Club Anderlecht, commonly abbreviated to RSC Anderlecht, is a Belgian professional football club based in Anderlecht, Brussels Capital-Region. Anderlecht plays in the Belgian Pro League and is the most successful Belgian football team in European competitions, with five trophies, as well as in the Belgian domestic league, with 34 championship wins. They have also won nine Belgian Cups and hold the record for most consecutive Belgian championship titles, winning five between the 1963–64 and 1967–68 seasons.

Founded in 1908, the club first reached the highest level in Belgian football in 1921–22 and have been playing in the first division continuously since 1935–36. They won their first major trophy after World War II with a championship win in 1946–47. They never finished outside the top six of the Belgian first division with the exception of 2019–20 (8th) and 2022–23 (11th). They are ranked 14th amongst all-time UEFA club competition winners, tenth in the International Federation of Football History & Statistics continental Clubs of the 20th Century European ranking and were 41st in the 2012 UEFA team rankings. In 1986, they achieved their best UEFA ranking with a joint first place with Juventus.

Anderlecht have been playing their matches in the Astrid Park in the municipality of Anderlecht since 1917. Their current stadium was renamed Lotto Park in 2019. Previously it was called Constant Vanden Stock Stadium which was first opened in 1983 to replace the former Emile Versé Stadium. They play in purple and white outfits. They have long-standing rivalries with Club Brugge and Standard Liège.

== History ==
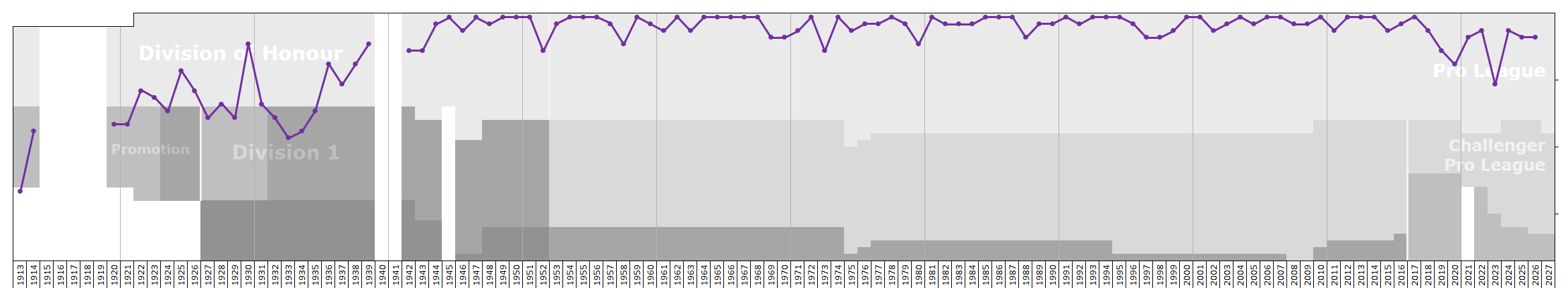
Historical chart of Anderlecht league performance

Founded as Sporting Club Anderlechtois on 27 May 1908 by a dozen football lovers at the Concordia café (located in the Rue d'Aumale/Aumalestraat in the municipality of Anderlecht), the club beat Institut Saint-Georges in their first match, 11–8. They joined the official competition in 1909–10, starting at the lowest level in the Belgian football league system, then the third provincial division. In 1912–13, they gained promotion to the second-higher level of football, then named the Promotion. After only one season at that level, the championships were suspended due to World War I, and resumed in 1919–20. With the popularity of the team increasing, Anderlecht had moved to a new stadium in the Astrid Park in 1917 (then known as Meir Park). They baptized the stadium Stade Emile Versé in honor of the club's first major patron, the industrialist Emile Versé.

At the end of the 1920–21 season, Anderlecht was promoted to the first division for the first time in their history. In the next 14 seasons, Anderlecht was relegated four times (1923, 1926, 1928 and 1931) and promoted four times (1924, 1927, 1929, 1935), earning themselves the mockery of local rival clubs Union Saint-Gilloise and Daring Club de Bruxelles, who nicknamed them the "lift club". In 1933, 25 years after their formation, the club changed their name to Royal Sporting Club Anderlechtois. Since their promotion in 1935, Anderlecht has remained at the top level of football. With Jef Mermans, a striker signed from K Tubantia FC in 1942 for a record fee of 125,000 Belgian francs, Anderlecht won their first league title in 1947. Their success increased in the following years as they won six more titles between 1949–50 and 1955–56 (winning three consecutive titles twice) and two more in 1958–59 and 1961–62. In the 1960s, under the coaching of Pierre Sinibaldi and then of Andreas Beres, the club even won five titles in a row (from 1963–64 to 1967–68), which is still a Belgian league record. The star of this team was Paul Van Himst, topscorer in 1965, 1967 and 1969 and Belgian Golden Shoe winner in 1960, 1961, 1965 and 1974.

Anderlecht played in the first European Champion Clubs' Cup in 1955–56, and lost both legs of their tie against Vörös Lobogo. They had to wait until the 1962–63 season to win their first European tie, with a 1–0 victory over Real Madrid, which followed a 3–3 draw in Spain.

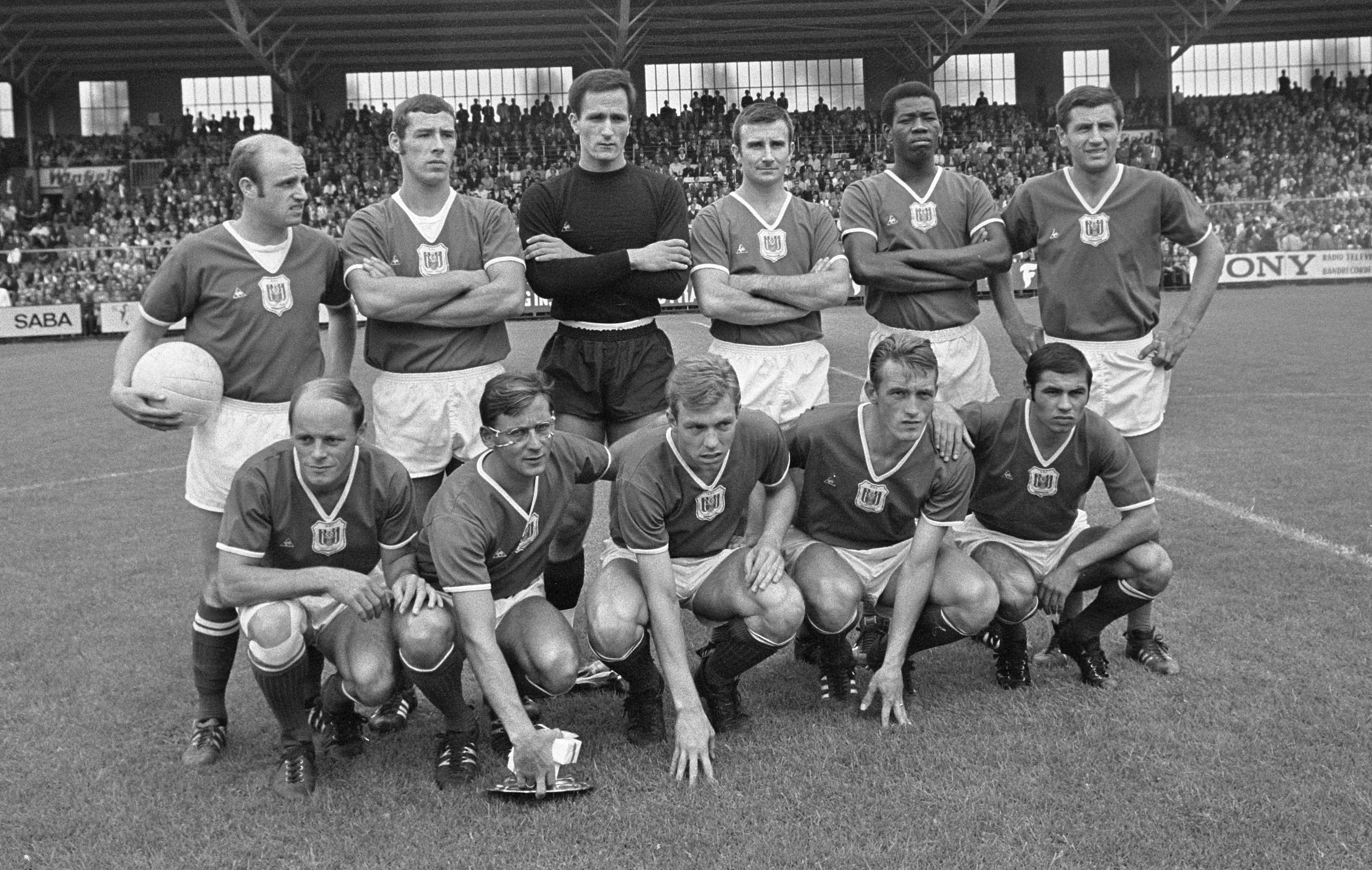
The Anderlecht football squad in 1967

For the first time, they advanced to the second round, where they beat CSKA Sofia before losing to Dundee in the quarter-finals. In the 1969–70 Inter-Cities Fairs Cup, Anderlecht lost in the final against Arsenal. Between 1975 and 1984, Anderlecht only won one championship but they achieved considerable European success. The club reached three consecutive finals of the European Cup Winners’ Cup, starting in 1975–76. In that season, Anderlecht secured their first major European trophy by defeating West Ham United 4–2 in the final held in Brussels. Both Rob Rensenbrink and François Van der Elst managed to score two goals. The following season, they reached the final again but narrowly lost 2–0 to Hamburg in Amsterdam. In 1978, Anderlecht returned to the top of the competition by winning their second Cup Winners’ Cup title, overcoming Austria Wien 4–0 in Paris.

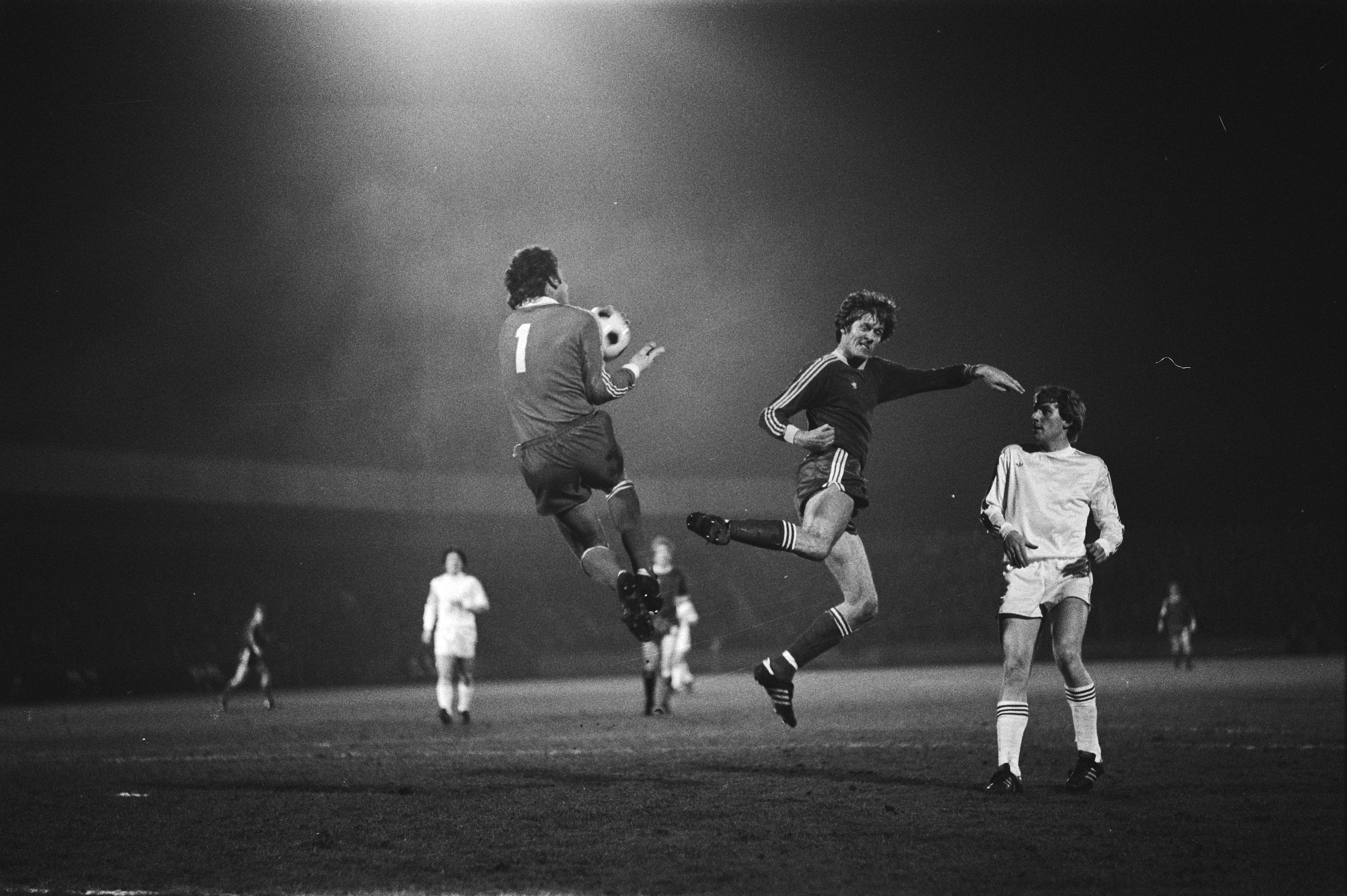
Anderlecht eliminated Twente to reach the 1978 European Cup Winners' Cup final

Their victories in 1976 and 1978 also earned them spots in the European Super Cups, contested between the winners of the European Cup and the Cup Winners’ Cup. Anderlecht triumphed on both occasions: in 1976, they defeated Bayern Munich over two legs (1–2 away, 4–1 at home), and in 1978, they overcame Liverpool with a 4–3 aggregate score.

The team’s success in these finals contributed significantly to Anderlecht's international reputation, and established Anderlecht as one of Europe’s leading clubs of the era.

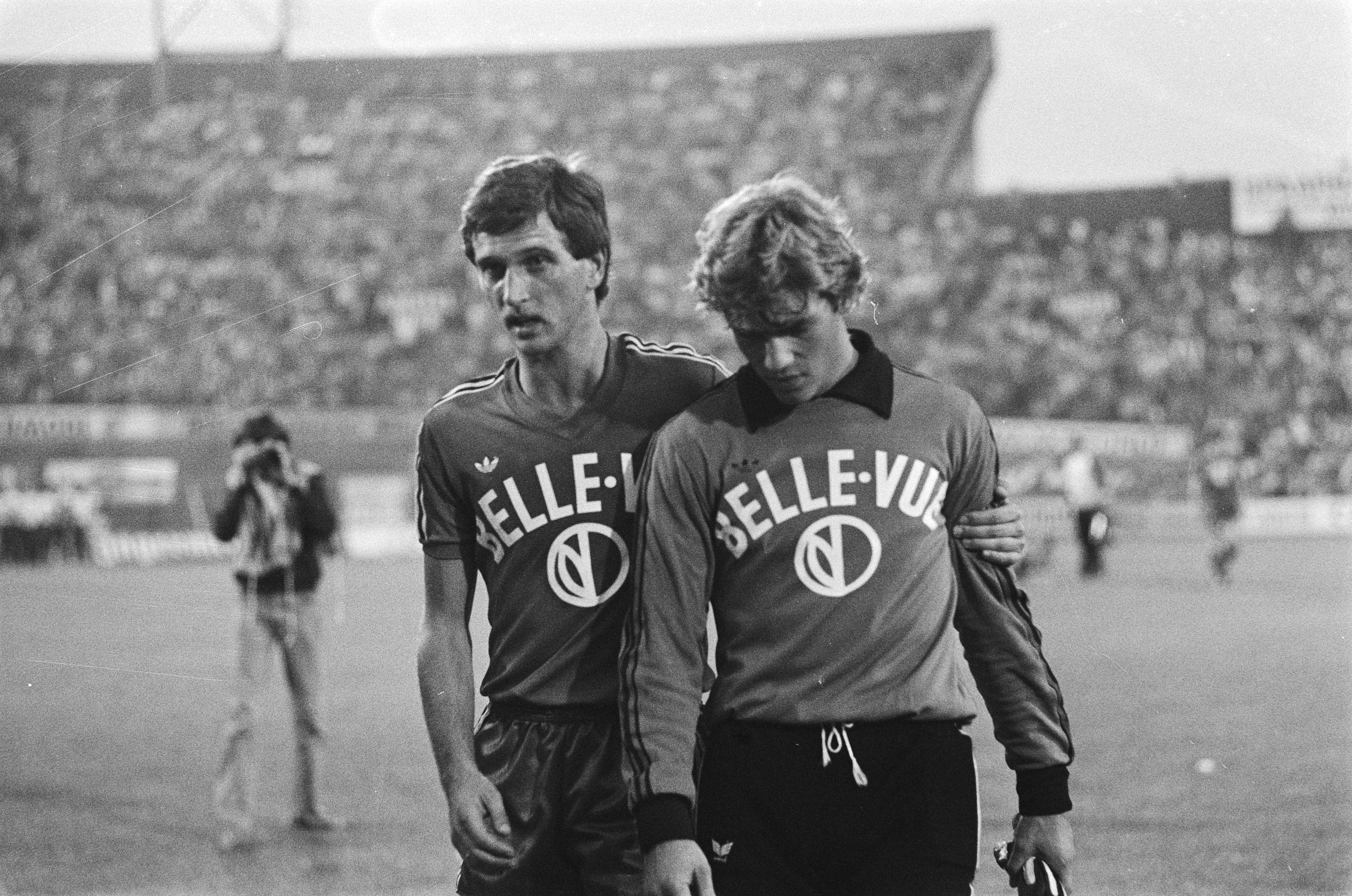
Ludo Coeck and Jacky Munaron in 1978

The 1982–83 season was a noteworthy season for the club for numerous reasons: former Anderlecht favourite Paul Van Himst was named the new coach, they won the 1982–83 UEFA Cup after a 2–1 aggregate victory in the final against Benfica, and under the impulse of sporting director Michel Verschueren, the rebuilding of the club stadium began. But in the domestic league, Anderlecht had to settle for second place behind Standard. Their bid to retain the UEFA Cup in 1983–84 failed at the final hurdle against English side Tottenham Hotspur. It later emerged in 1997 that Anderlecht had reached the 1984 final by bribing the semi-final referee to the equivalent of £27,000, ensuring passage against another English side, Nottingham Forest.

After three second-place finishes in a row, the Purple and Whites secured an easy 18th title in 1984–85, 11 points ahead of Club Brugge. In 1985–86, Anderlecht won the championship again, but this time after a two-legged play-off against Club Brugge. Anderlecht won their 20th championship on the last matchday of the 1986–87 season. They then lost key players Franky Vercauteren, Enzo Scifo (transferred in the summer of 1987) and Juan Lozano (heavily injured in a game at KSV Waregem a few months earlier). A weakened team coached by Raymond Goethals finished only fourth in 1988 behind Club Brugge, KV Mechelen and Royal Antwerp, but they nonetheless managed to lift the Belgian Cup for the sixth time in club history after a 2–0 victory over Standard Liège, with goals by Luc Nilis and Eddie Krnčević. The next year, Anderlecht retained the trophy with goals by Eddie Krncevic and Milan Janković (again with a 2–0 win over Standard), but finished second in the championship. After his second cup win, Goethals left for Bordeaux in the French Ligue 1.

During the 1990s, Anderlecht reached one more European final, the 1990 European Cup Winners' Cup final, which they lost to Italian club Sampdoria. The club then declined in European competitions, with the 1990–91 and 1996–97 UEFA Cup quarter-finals their best results. In national competition, they won four championship titles and a cup. During the 2000s, Anderlecht secured five more Belgian champion titles, reaching a total of 29 titles in 2007, in addition to one more cup victory. In the 2000–01 UEFA Champions League, they qualified for the first time to the second round, then another group stage, where they finished third in their group behind Real Madrid and Leeds United.

In 2009–10, the Purple and Whites won their 30th Belgian league title, while in the 2011–12 UEFA Europa League, Anderlecht made history by becoming the first Belgian team to finish the group stage of a European competition with the maximum number of points, dominating group opposition Lokomotiv Moscow, Sturm Graz and AEK Athens. They were also the only team of that year's Europa League to achieve this feat. On 6 May 2012, Anderlecht won their 31st Belgian championship, while on 22 July, they won their tenth Belgian Super Cup.

The seasons 2014–15 and 2015–16 were a disappointment sportively. After the appointiment of young Swiss coach René Weiler, Anderlecht, with youth players like Youri Tielemans and Leander Dendoncker, became champions again in the 2016–17 season.

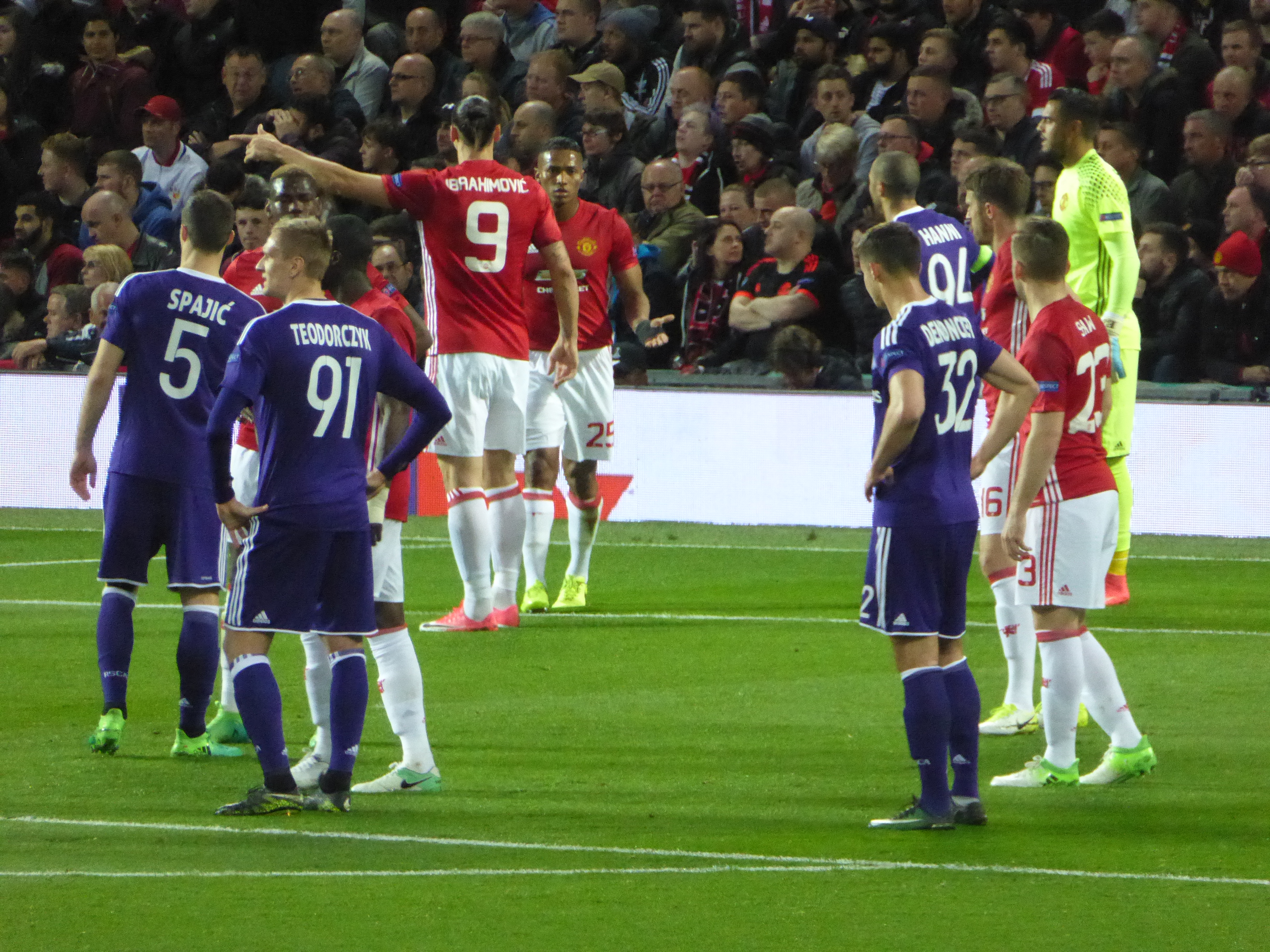
2016–17 UEFA Europa League 1/4 final return game in Manchester, April 2017

In the Europa League they were eliminated in the quarter final by Manchester United in extra time. After businessman Marc Coucke took over the club in 2018, structural changes followed, together with regular personnel changes. Sportingly, a low point was reached in 2019–20: despite the return of club icon Vincent Kompany, the club did not qualify for the European club competitions the following season, which it had managed for the previous 55 years.

After a few disappointing seasons, Anderlecht again competed for the championship title in the 2023–24 season, finishing second in the regular season of the Belgian Pro League.

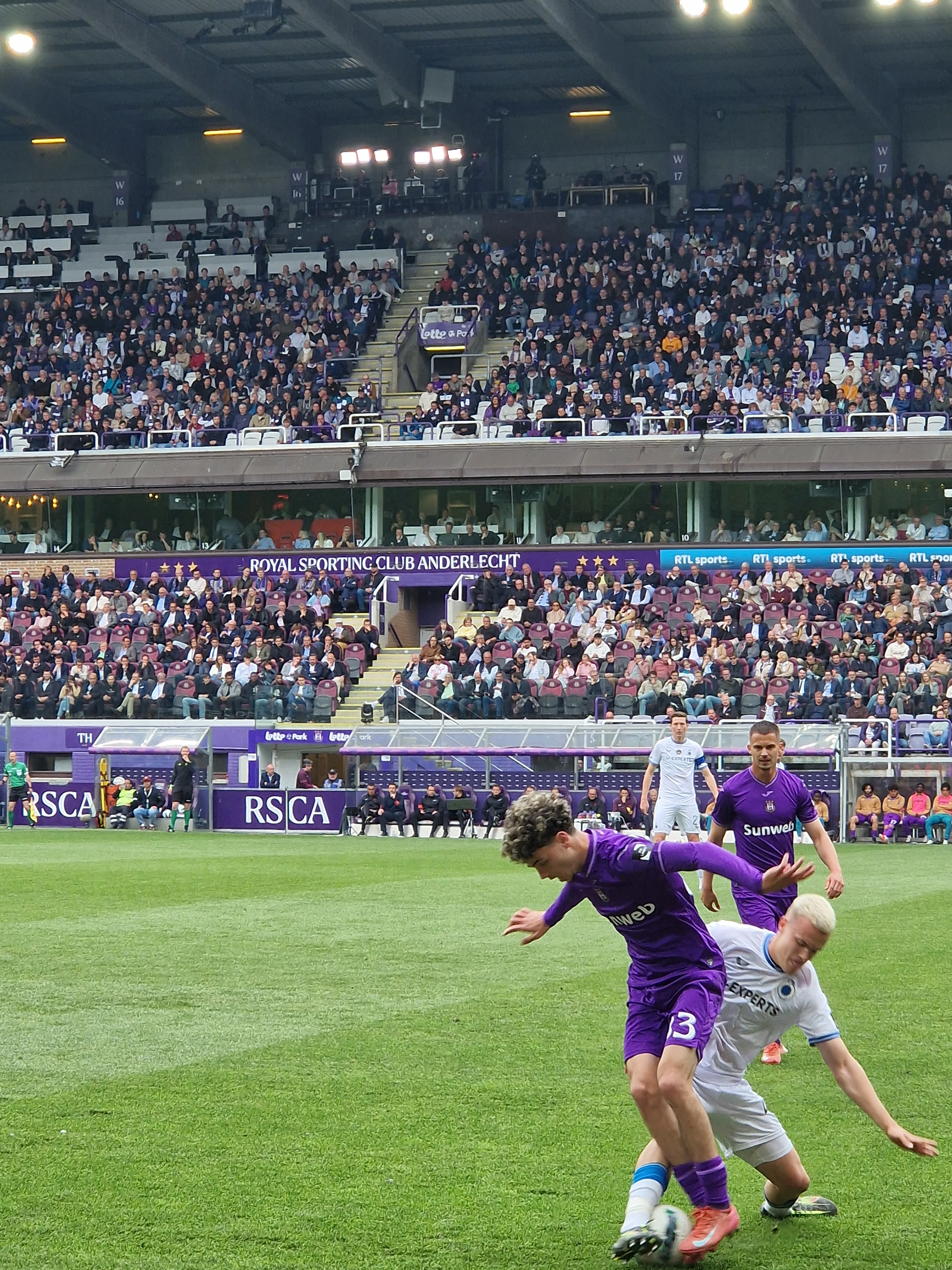
Anderlecht home game against Club Brugge, May 2025

== Colours and badge ==
The Anderlecht colours are purple and white, and the club's home kit is generally purple with white trim, though they did wear a black and purple home kit in the 2005–06 season, and a grey in the 2007–08 season. In the beginning, purple was the main colour of the shirts.

The origin of the colours is not entirely clear. According to journalist Robert Wyckaert, they were the colours of a flower parade held in the municipality of Anderlecht. In it, the future Queen Elisabeth was driven around in a carriage decorated with white and purple orchids. Purple is as well the color of the Belgian monarchy. The first outfits consisted of white pants and a purple and white shirt.

Anderlecht's colours inspired other football clubs. United Arab Emirates' Al Ain FC, for instance, decided to change their colours to purple, after they saw Anderlecht play in a friendly tournament in 1977.

The motto of Anderlecht ("Mens sana in corpore sano") is written on its badge as are the three letters "SCA", referring to the initial name of the club (Sporting Club Anderlechtois). In 1933, the club celebrated its 25th anniversary and received royal statute. A crown was added following the name change to Royal Sporting Club Anderlechtois. In 1959, the badge with 2 rings was implemented in a new crest, to mark the 50th anniversary of the club.

=== Kit evolution ===
1960	1965	1970	1980	1985	1990

2000	2005	2010	2015	2020	2025

Kit suppliers and shirt sponsors

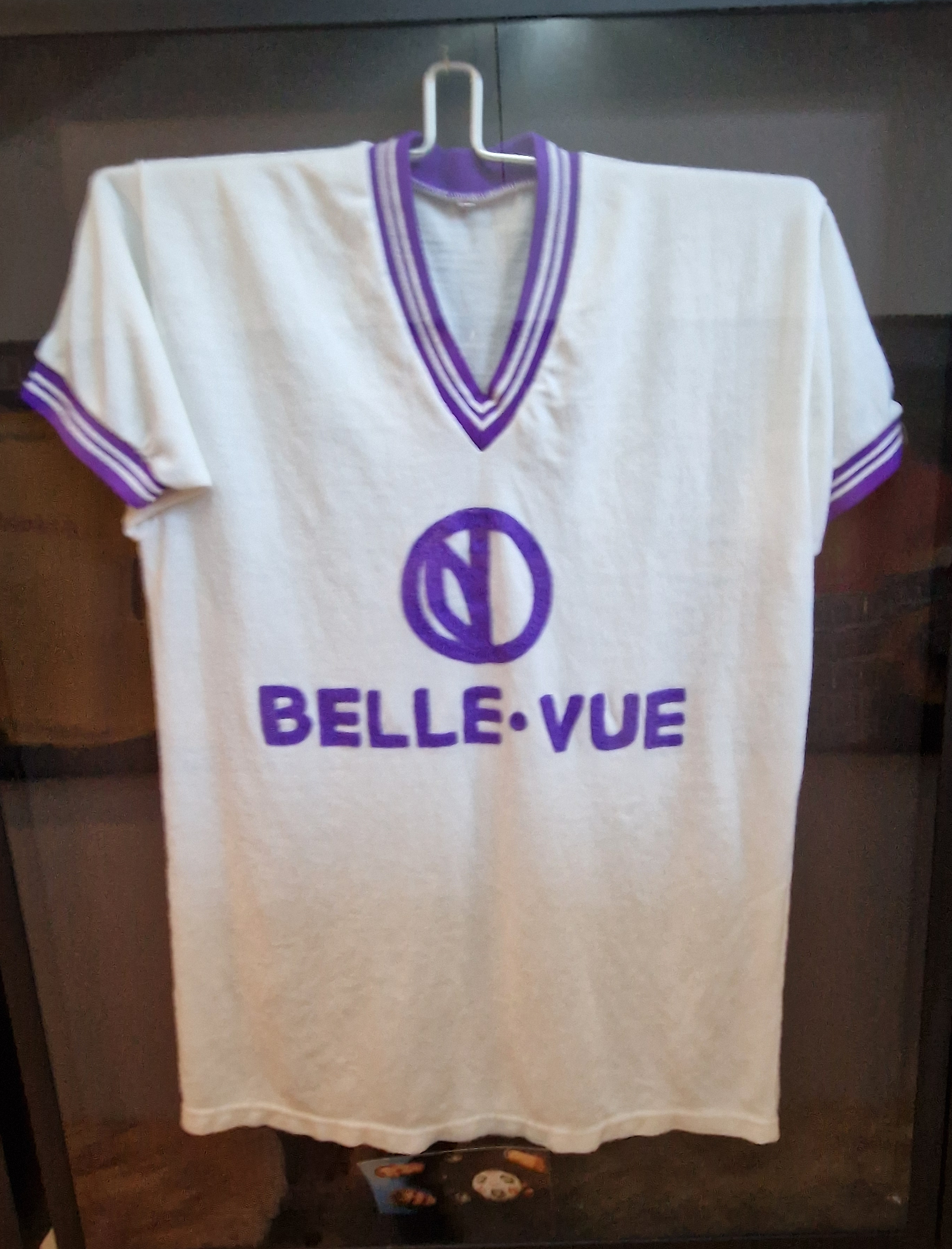
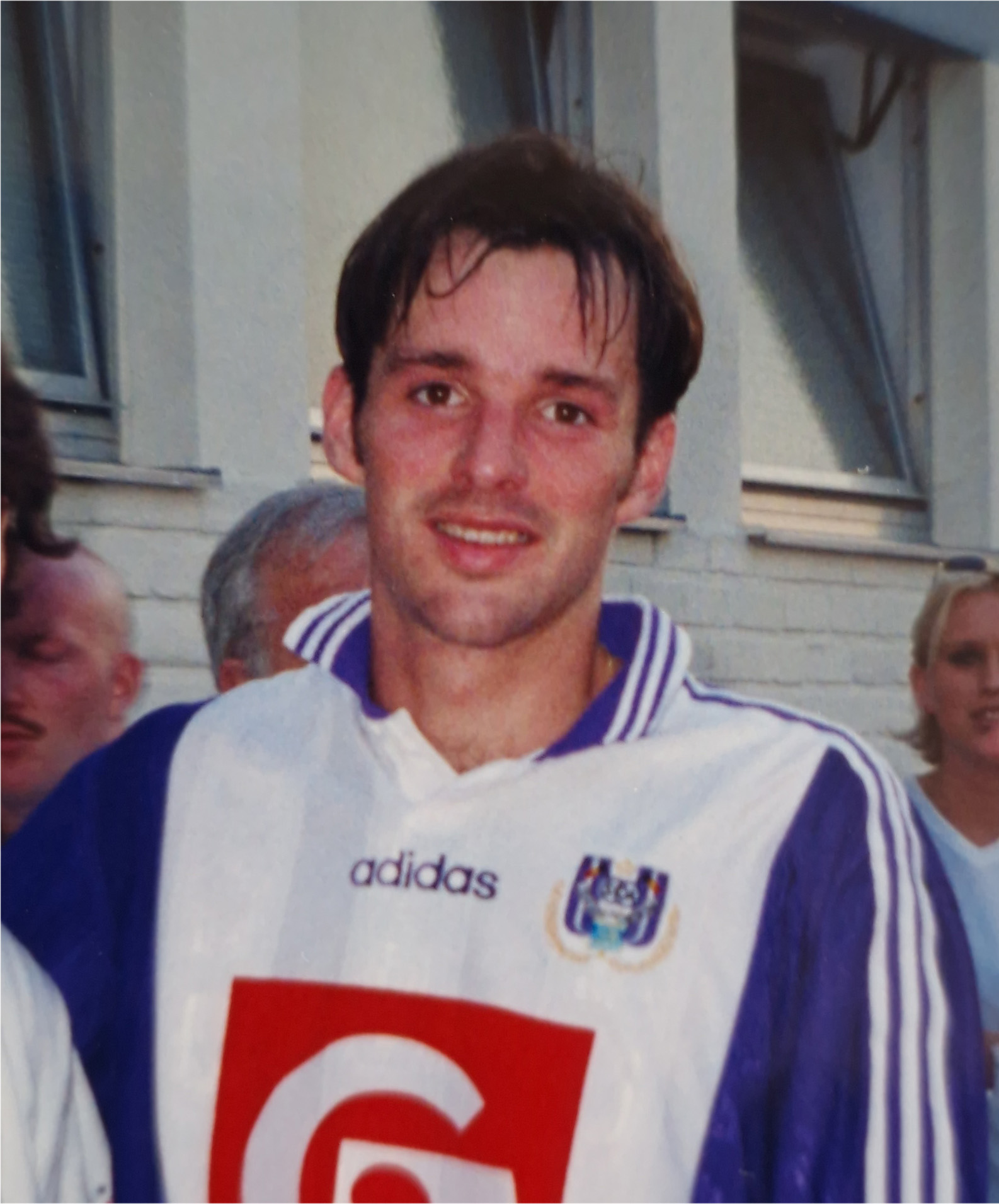
After the club's very first shirt sponsor Belle-Vue (left: a 1973 shirt), Generale Bank/Fortis became the main sponsor for decades (right: Bart Goor in 1997)

Period	Kit manufacturer	Shirt sponsor	Back sponsor	Sleeve sponsor
1973–1974	In-House / Le Coq Sportif	Belle-Vue	None	None
1974–1982	Adidas	Belle-Vue	None	None
1982–1991	Adidas	Générale de Banque	None	None
1991–2000	Adidas	Générale de Banque	None	Générale de Banque
2000–2009	Adidas	Fortis	None	Fortis
2009–2014	Adidas	BNP Paribas Fortis	None	BNP Paribas Fortis
2014–2017	Adidas	BNP Paribas Fortis / Proximus (in cup and UEFA games)	Proximus	BNP Paribas Fortis
2017–2019	Adidas	BNP Paribas Fortis / Allianz (in UEFA games)	Proximus	BNP Paribas Fortis
2019–2020	Joma	BNP Paribas Fortis	Proximus	BNP Paribas Fortis
2020–2023	Joma	DVV Insurance (Home) / Candriam (Away)	None	None
2023–2024	Joma	DVV Insurance (Home) / Candriam (Away)	None	Napoleon Sports & Casino
Aug.–Dec. 2024	Joma	Napoleon Sports & Casino / Sunweb (Away in UEFA matches)	None	None
2025–June 2026	Joma	Sunweb	Napoleon Sports & Casino	None
2026–	Adidas	Sunweb	Napoleon Sports & Casino	None

=== Crest evolution ===
Crest of Anderlechtois (1933–1959). Similar to the crest of the Brussels based Union and Daring Molenbeek

Crest of Anderlechtois (1959–1979)
Following the 50th anniversary

Crest of Anderlecht (1979–1989) The French-language name disappeared

Crest of Anderlecht (1989–2010)

Crest of Anderlecht (2010–2023)
3 stars represent 30 titles

Crest of Anderlecht (2023–)
All yellowish colors were converted to one golden color

== Stadium ==
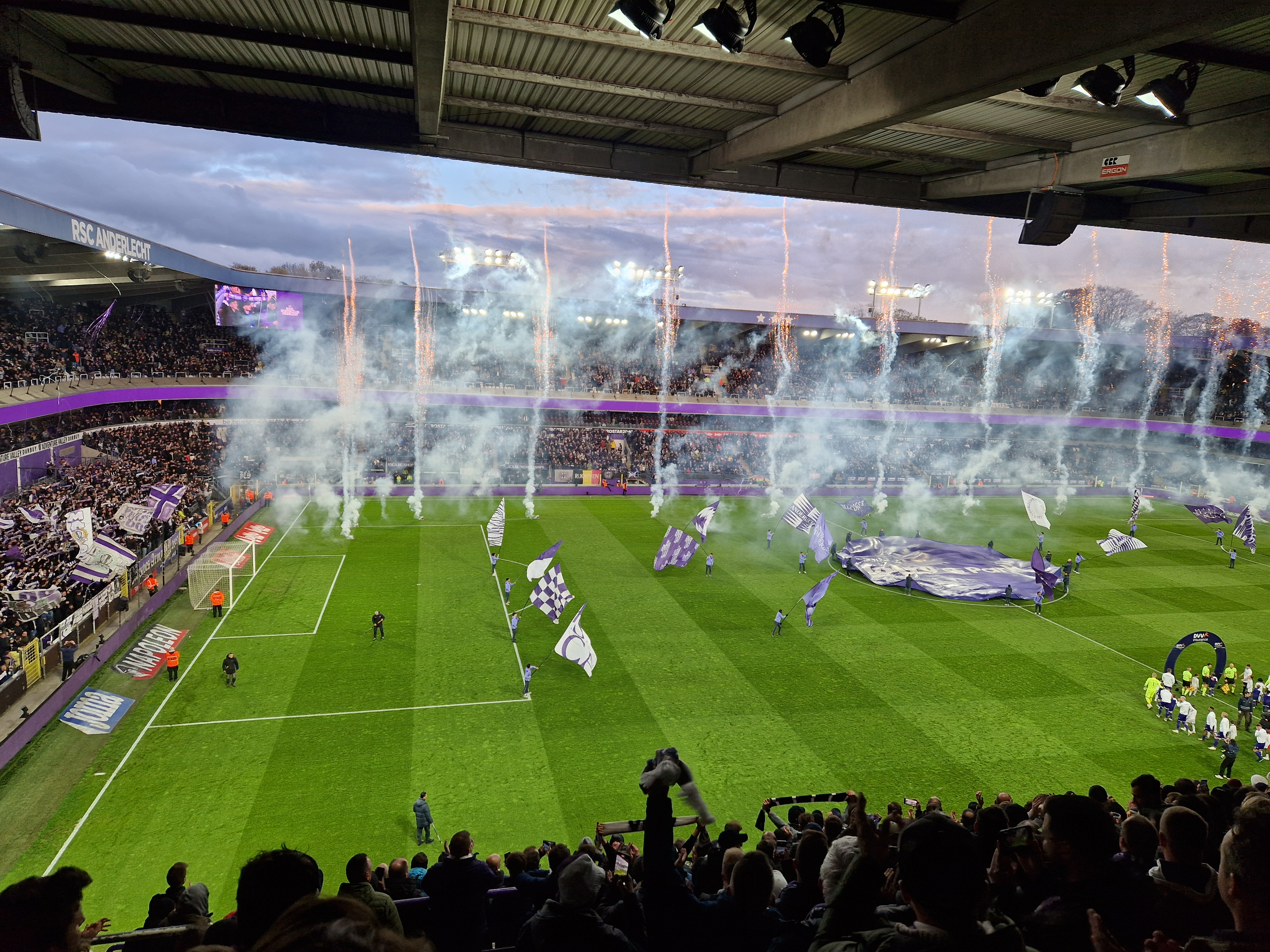
Atmosphere before a 2024 Champions' Play-offs home game against Cercle Brugge

Anderlecht play their home matches at the Lotto Park stadium located within the Astrid Park in the municipality of Anderlecht. Initially the stadium had a capacity of 40,000 seats and standing places, but through the years the amount was reduced to 22,500 seats for safety reasons.

Anderlecht has been playing in the Astrid Park since the building of the Emile Versé Stadium in 1917. The stadium was completely rebuilt in 1983 and renamed in honour of the then chairman Constant Vanden Stock. Prior to 1917, the club has played on a pitch in the current Rue du Serment/Eedstraat for a couple of years since 1908, then in a stadium located in Rue Verheydenstraat (now Rue Démosthènestraat). In 2013 the stadium was refurbished, with installation of new scoreboards and advertising strips alongside the border of the pitch in accordance with UEFA regulations for the Champions League. AIM Sport was chosen as the provider for the ultra-modern LED strips and their controllers.

Anderlecht would move to the 60,000-capacity Eurostadium when it was expected to be completed in 2019. The Eurostadion would also become home to the Belgium national team and host UEFA Euro 2020. However, during the years that followed, the project was plagued by numerous delays caused by political infighting. In February 2017, Anderlecht eventually pulled out of the project. In the 2018–19 season, Anderlecht drew an average home attendance of 18,536 in 15 league games at their stadium.

In July 2019, the new owner Marc Coucke sold the naming rights of the Constant Vanden Stock Stadium to the firm Lotto, and changed the name to Lotto Park.

== Club's anthem ==
Before the start of every home match, the song "Anderlecht Champion" by Lange Jojo is played in the stadium. It was released in 1985 in French and Flemish (Brussels dialect) after Anderlecht became national champions. The song was reworked into a Belgian national supporters' song and was used at the 1986 FIFA World Cup in Mexico, after which the chorus "Oléé, Olé, Olé, Oléé" became an international anthem used in sports, musical performances and political activities.

== Supporters ==
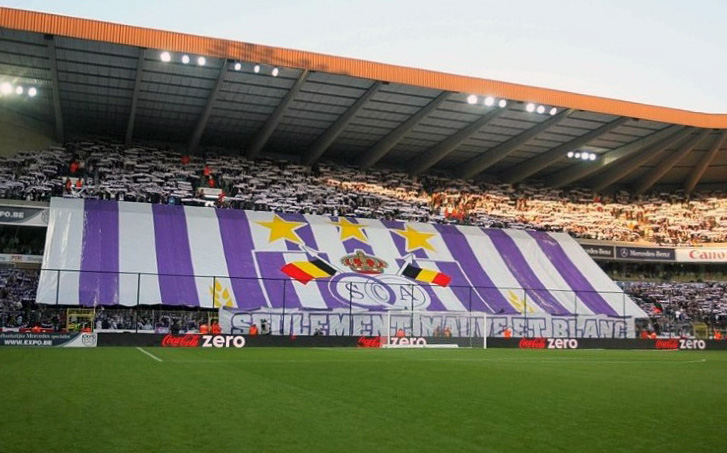
Anderlecht tifo with club crest in 2015

The club had the highest average attendance in the Belgian First Division for ten years, until 2004–05. Anderlecht supporters hail from all over the country and only a minority come from the Brussels Capital Region. Anderlecht counts 77 fan clubs, of which 5 are abroad (one in France, one in Poland, one in Texas, USA, one in Montreal, Canada and one in Sunderland, England). On 1 January 2024, RSC Anderlecht had 4 million followers on social media, the highest among Belgian football clubs.

The nickname of rival supporters for Anderlecht supporters is "dikkenekken". This Flemish expression (translated as "thick necks") refers to their exaggerated pride towards their club, as well as themselves. In recent years, the term has also been used jokingly among Anderlecht supporters.

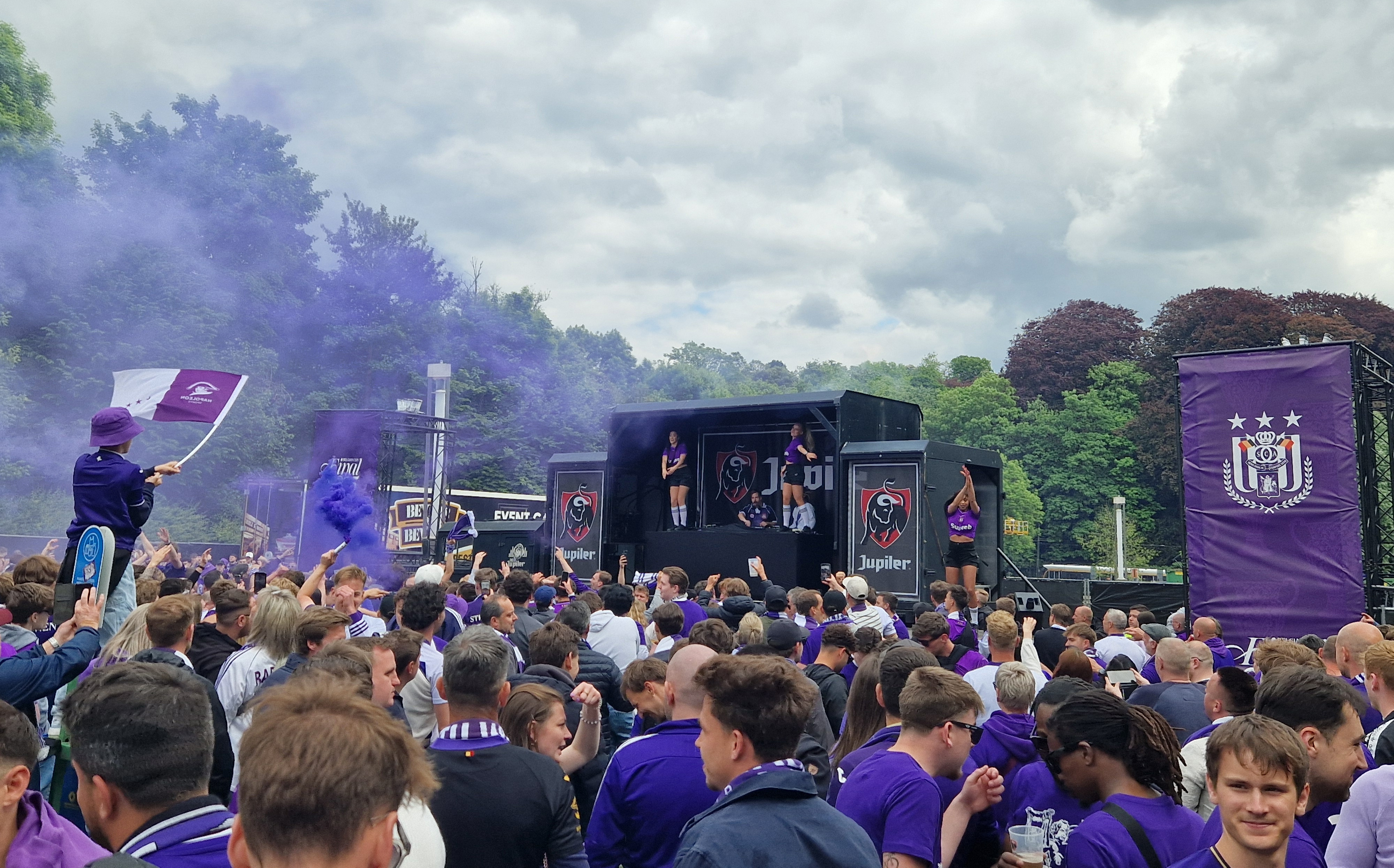
Anderlecht supporters village before the 2025 Cup Final against Club Brugge

== Rivals ==
Until 2024, Anderlecht's main rivals were Standard Liege and Club Brugge, the two other teams of the "Big Three" in Belgium. Only a few players made the transfer from Club Brugge to Anderlecht, and when it happened it often caused controversy. For example, during his ninth season with Club Brugge, the transfer of Lorenzo Staelens to Anderlecht was already announced in April 1998, after which he had to finish the remaining 10 games for Club Brugge with constant whistling of furious Bruges supporters. Even when Staelens had to take a penalty for their club he was booed, and there were cheers when he eventually missed it.

Transfers of players to and from Standard Liege are more common. A tifo of a Standard supporters association, with the image of a decapitated Steven Defour in 2015 directed to their former player caused considerable controversy in Belgium, after which the Federal Public Service Interior launched an investigation.

Around 2021, Standard Liege became less important in Belgium and were replaced by Union as the main rival for Anderlecht. Union became one of the top teams in Belgium when they were promoted back to the top division (after spending 48 years in lower divisions) and Union is a Brussels club like Anderlecht. Adding to this new rivalry, Union won the Belgium Cup in 2026 against Anderlecht.

== Honours ==
R.S.C. Anderlecht honours
Type	Competition	Titles	Seasons
Domestic	Belgian First Division	34	1946–47, 1948–49, 1949–50, 1950–51, 1953–54, 1954–55, 1955–56, 1958–59, 1961–62, 1963–64, 1964–65, 1965–66, 1966–67, 1967–68, 1971–72, 1973–74, 1980–81, 1984–85, 1985–86, 1986–87, 1990–91, 1992–93, 1993–94, 1994–95, 1999–2000, 2000–01, 2003–04, 2005–06, 2006–07, 2009–10, 2011–12, 2012–13, 2013–14, 2016–17
Domestic	Belgian Second Division	2	1923–24, 1934–35
Domestic	Belgian Cup	9	1964–65, 1971–72, 1972–73, 1974–75, 1975–76, 1987–88, 1988–89, 1993–94, 2007–08
Domestic	Belgian League Cup	3	1973, 1974, 2000
Domestic	Belgian Super Cup	13	1985, 1987, 1993, 1995, 2000, 2001, 2006, 2007, 2010, 2012, 2013, 2014, 2017
Continental	UEFA Europa League	1	1982–83
Continental	UEFA Cup Winners' Cup	2	1975–76, 1977–78
Continental	UEFA Super Cup	2	1976, 1978

- record
- ^{s} shared record

=== Minor ===
- Mohammed V Cup:
  - Winners (1): 1976

=== Friendly ===
- Tournoi de Paris:
  - Winners (3): 1964, 1966, 1977
- Amsterdam Tournament:
  - Winners (1): 1976
- Tournoi Indoor de Paris-Bercy:
  - Winners (1): 1985
- Bruges Matins:
  - Winners (2): 1985, 1988
- Youth tournaments (selection):
  - Toulon Tournament (1): 1967, Future Cup (4): 2011, 2013, 2015, 2026 Torneo di Viareggio (1): 2013, Copa Amsterdam (1): 2015, Otten Cup (1): 2016, Kevin De Bruyne Cup (1): 2018

=== Individual ===
- Belgian First Division topscorer:
  - Jef Mermans (1946–47, 1947–48, 1949–50), Hippolyte Van Den Bosch (1953–54), Jacky Stockman (1961–62), Paul Van Himst (1963–64, 1965–66, 1967–68), Jan Mulder (1966–67), Rob Rensenbrink (1972–73), Attila Ladinszky (1973–74), François Van der Elst (1976–77), Erwin Vandenbergh (1982–83, 1985–86), Arnór Guðjohnsen (1986–87), Eddie Krncevic (1988–89), Tomasz Radzinski (2000–01), Nenad Jestrović (2004–05), Romelu Lukaku (2009–10), Aleksandar Mitrović (2014–15), Łukasz Teodorczyk (2016–17), Hamdi Harbaoui (2017–18)
- European League topscorer: Jef Mermans (1949–50)
- European Cup topscorer: Paul Van Himst (1966–67)
- World League Topscorer: Jef Mermans (1949–50)

== Awards ==
=== Club ===
- Belgian Sports Merit Award: 1978
- Belgian Sports Team of the Year: 2000

=== Individual ===
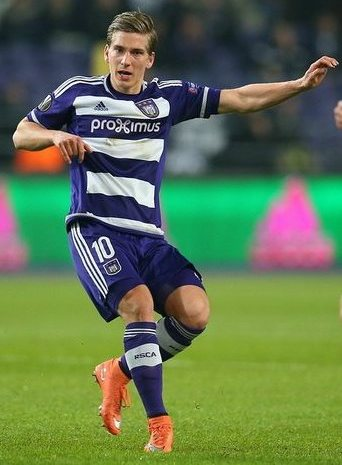
Dennis Praet in 2016, the last Anderlecht player to win the Belgian Golden Shoe

- Belgian Golden Shoe:
  - Jef Jurion (1957, 1962), Paul Van Himst (1960, 1961, 1965, 1974), Wilfried Puis (1964), Rob Rensenbrink (1976), Franky Vercauteren (1983), Enzo Scifo (1984), Marc Degryse (1991), Philippe Albert (1992), Pär Zetterberg (1993, 1997), Gilles De Bilde (1994), Lorenzo Staelens (1999), Jan Koller (2000), Aruna Dindane (2003), Vincent Kompany (2004), Mbark Boussoufa (2006, 2010), Matías Suárez (2011), Dieumerci Mbokani (2012), Dennis Praet (2014)
- Belgian Professional Footballer of the Season:
  - Juan Lozano (1986–87), Marc Degryse (1989–90), Pär Zetterberg (1996–97, 1997–98), Walter Baseggio (2000–01), Aruna Dindane (2003–04), Vincent Kompany (2004–05), Mohammed Tchité (2006–07), Mbark Boussoufa (2008–09, 2009–10), Matías Suárez (2011–12), Youri Tielemans (2016–17)
- Belgian Young Professional Footballer of the Season:
  - Bertrand Crasson (1990–91), Johan Walem (1991–92), Celestine Babayaro (1994–95, 1995–96), Walter Baseggio (1998–99, 1999–2000), Alin Stoica (2000–01), Vincent Kompany (2003–04, 2004–05), Lucas Biglia (2006–07), Youri Tielemans (2013–14, 2014–15), Yari Verschaeren (2018–19)
- Belgian Professional Goalkeeper of the Season:
  - Filip De Wilde (1993–94, 1999–2000), Daniel Zitka (2006–07), Silvio Proto (2011–12, 2012–13)
- Belgian Professional Manager of the Season:
  - Paul Van Himst (1982–83), Aimé Anthuenis (1998–99, 1999–2000, 2000–01), Hugo Broos (2003–04), Ariël Jacobs (2009–10), René Weiler (2016–17)
- Onze d'Or:
  - Rob Rensenbrink (1976)
- Danish Footballer of the Year:
  - Morten Olsen (1983)
- Swedish Golden Ball:
  - Pär Zetterberg (1997)
- Canadian Footballer of the Year:
  - Tomasz Radzinski (1998)
- Czech Footballer of the Year:
  - Jan Koller (1999)
- Hungarian Golden Ball:
  - Roland Juhász (2009, 2011)

== Players ==
=== Current squad ===
As of 4 September 2026

Note: Flags indicate national team as defined under FIFA eligibility rules; some limited exceptions apply. Players may hold more than one non-FIFA nationality.

No.	Pos.	Nation	Player
2	DF	GER	Zoumana Keita
3	DF	DEN	Lucas Hey
4	DF	FRA	Giulian Biancone
5	DF	MDA	Oleg Reabciuk
6	DF	SWE	Ludwig Augustinsson
7	DF	SEN	Ilay Camara
8	MF	CIV	Romeo Amane
9	FW	SRB	Mihajlo Cvetković
10	FW	GER	Marten Winkler
11	FW	FIN	Oliver Antman
12	DF	IRL	Andrew Omobamidele (on loan from Strasbourg)
14	FW	UKR	Danylo Sikan
18	MF	CZE	Lukáš Ambros
19	MF	NOR	Thelo Aasgaard (on loan from Rangers)
21	FW	MAR	Tawfik Bentayeb
24	MF	NED	Enric Llansana
26	GK	BEL	Colin Coosemans (captain)

No.	Pos.	Nation	Player
27	DF	FRA	Léo Pétrot
29	MF	COD	Mario Stroeykens
30	MF	GRE	Ilias Koutsoupias
32	GK	GER	Justin Heekeren
33	GK	BEL	Mattis Seghers
49	FW	BEL	Jayden Onia Seke
50	DF	BEL	Kaïs Barry
53	FW	BEL	Noa Ojea
54	DF	BEL	Killian Sardella
55	MF	BEL	Marco Kana
61	FW	BEL	Joshua Nga Kana
66	GK	BEL	Michiel Haentjens
68	MF	BEL	Noah Kalonji
79	DF	MAR	Ali Maamar
83	FW	BEL	Tristan Degreef
91	FW	BEL	Adriano Bertaccini

=== Out on loan ===
Note: Flags indicate national team as defined under FIFA eligibility rules; some limited exceptions apply. Players may hold more than one non-FIFA nationality.

No.	Pos.	Nation	Player
—	DF	SEN	Moussa N'Diaye (at Werder Bremen until 30 June 2027)
—	MF	MAR	Anas Tajaouart (at La Louvière until 30 June 2027)

No.	Pos.	Nation	Player
—	FW	MLI	Ibrahim Kanaté (at 1. FC Kaiserslautern until 30 June 2027)

== Notable former players ==
=== Most successful players ===
Rob Rensenbrink, awarded as the club's best player of the 20th century	Paul Van Himst, named as Belgium's best player of the 20th century	Jef Mermans, the club's all-time topscorer (367 goals in 399 games)	Olivier Deschacht played most games for Anderlecht (602)

Name	Nationality	Position	RSC Anderlecht career (Note: Career years given in full seasons and may not be entirely correct if the player made a late season debut or an early season retirement.)	League record (Note: "League" matches includes Svenska Serien, Allsvenskan, Mästerskapsserien and Division 2 matches as well as qualification and play-off matches.)		Honours (Note: Note that a player may have been part of the team during one of its winning seasons but did not receive a medal due to too few played matches.)
Name	Nationality	Position	RSC Anderlecht career	Apps	Goals	Honours
Hugo Broos	(Belgium)	DF	1970–1983	350	1	2 UEFA Cup Winners' Cups, 2 UEFA Super Cups, 1 UEFA Cup, 3 Belgian Championships, 4 Belgian Cups
Ludo Coeck	(Belgium)	MF	1972–1983	292	54	2 UEFA Cup Winners' Cups, 2 UEFA Super Cups, 1 UEFA Cup, 2 Belgian Championships, 3 Belgian Cups
Jean Cornelis	(Belgium)	DF	1958–1971	287	6	7 Belgian Championships, 1 Belgian Cup
Bertrand Crasson	(Belgium)	DF	1989–1996; 1998–2003	291	19	6 Belgian Championships, 1 Belgian Cup
Michel De Groote	(Belgium)	DF	1975–1977; 1979–1989	294	27	1 UEFA Cup Winners' Cup, 1 UEFA Super Cup, 1 UEFA Cup, 4 Belgian Championships, 3 Belgian Cups
Filip De Wilde	(Belgium)	GK	1987-1996; 1998–2003	369	0	6 Belgian Championships, 3 Belgian Cups
Olivier Deschacht	(Belgium)	DF	2001–2018	395	8	8 Belgian Championships, 1 Belgian Cup
Jean Dockx	(Belgium)	DF	1971–1978	214	12	2 UEFA Cup Winners' Cups, 1 UEFA Super Cup, 2 Belgian Championships, 4 Belgian Cups
Georges Grün	(Belgium)	DF	1982–1990; 1994–1996	258	31	1 UEFA Cup, 4 Belgian Championships, 2 Belgian Cups
Pierre Hanon	(Belgium)	DF/MF	1954–1970	353	31	9 Belgian Championships, 1 Belgian Cup
Georges Heylens	(Belgium)	DF	1960–1973	361	10	7 Belgian Championships, 3 Belgian Cups
Jef Jurion	(Belgium)	MF	1953–1968	390	73	8 Belgian Championships, 1 Belgian Cup
Martin Lippens	(Belgium)	MF	1954–1966	232	52	7 Belgian Championships, 1 Belgian Cup
Henri Meert	(Belgium)	GK	1942–1960	343	1	8 Belgian Championships
Jef Mermans	(Belgium)	FW	1942–1957	384	343	7 Belgian Championships
Jacky Munaron	(Belgium)	GK	1974–1989	293	0	2 UEFA Cup Winners' Cups, 2 UEFA Super Cups, 1 UEFA Cup, 4 Belgian Championships, 4 Belgian Cups
Luc Nilis	(Belgium)	FW	1986–1994	223	124	4 Belgian Championships, 3 Belgian Cups
Silvio Proto	(Belgium)	GK	2005–2016	246	0	6 Belgian Championships, 1 Belgian Cup
Wilfried Puis	(Belgium)	FW	1960–1971	267	52	6 Belgian Championships, 1 Belgian Cup
Rob Rensenbrink	(Netherlands)	FW	1971–1980	262	143	2 UEFA Cup Winners' Cups, 2 UEFA Super Cups, 2 Belgian Championships, 4 Belgian Cups
Jan Ruiter	(Netherlands)	GK	1971–1977	179	0	1 UEFA Cup Winners' Cup, 1 UEFA Super Cup, 2 Belgian Championships, 4 Belgian Cups
Jacques Stockman	(Belgium)	FW	1957–1966	236	142	5 Belgian Championships, 2 Belgian Cups
Jean Trappeniers	(Belgium)	GK	1959–1971	359	0	6 Belgian Championships, 1 Belgian Cup
Gilbert Van Binst	(Belgium)	DF	1968–1980	262	28	2 UEFA Cup Winners' Cups, 2 UEFA Super Cups, 2 Belgian Championships, 4 Belgian Cups
François Van der Elst	(Belgium)	FW	1971–1980	243	82	2 UEFA Cup Winners' Cups, 2 UEFA Super Cups, 1 Belgian Championship, 1 Belgian Cup
Paul Van Himst	(Belgium)	FW	1959–1975	457	233	8 Belgian Championships, 4 Belgian Cups
Franky Vercauteren	(Belgium)	MF	1975–1987	367	93	2 UEFA Cup Winners' Cups, 2 UEFA Super Cups, 1 UEFA Cup, 4 Belgian Championships, 1 Belgian Cup
Pär Zetterberg	(Sweden)	MF	1989–2000; 2003–2006	284	72	6 Belgian Championships, 1 Belgian Cup

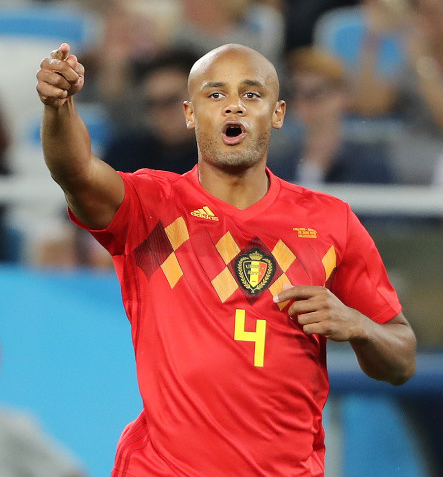
Vincent Kompany (in action for Belgium at the 2018 World Cup) has a past as player and head coach of Anderlecht

=== Other notable players ===
- (Belgium) Philippe Albert (1991–1994)
- (Denmark) Henrik Andersen (1982–1990)
- (Belgium) Walter Baseggio (1996–2005, 2007)
- (Argentina) Lucas Biglia (2006–2013)
- (Netherlands) Johnny Bosman (1991–1996)
- (Morocco) Mbark Boussoufa (2006–2011)
- (Belgium) Marc Degryse (1989–1995)
- (Belgium) Glen De Boeck (1995–2005)
- (Ivory Coast) Aruna Dindane (2000–2005)
- (Belgium) Jérémy Doku (2018–2020)
- (Denmark) Per Frimann (1982–1988)
- (Argentina) Nicolás Frutos (2006–2010)
- (Belgium) Bart Goor (1997–2001, 2005–2008)
- (Iceland) Arnór Guðjohnsen (1983–1990)
- (Netherlands) Arie Haan (1975–1981)
- (Egypt) Ahmed Hassan (2006–2008)
- (Hungary) Roland Juhász (2005–2013)
- (Nigeria) Stephen Keshi (1987–1991)
- (United States) Sacha Kljestan (2010–2015)
- (Czech Republic) Jan Koller (1999–2001)
- (Belgium) Vincent Kompany (2003–2006, 2019–2020)
- (Senegal) Cheikhou Kouyaté (2008–2014)
- (Spain) Juan Lozano (1981–1983, 1985–1989)
- (Belgium) Romelu Lukaku (2009–2011)
- (Romania) Nicolae Stanciu (2016–2018)
- (Democratic Republic of the Congo) Dieumerci Mbokani (2006–2007, 2011–2013)
- (Serbia) Aleksandar Mitrović (2013–2015)
- (Netherlands) Jan Mulder (1965–1972)
- (Zambia) Charly Musonda (1987–1997)
- (Belgium) Luís Oliveira (1988–1992)
- (Denmark) Morten Olsen (1980–1986)
- (Canada) Tomasz Radzinski (1998–2001)
- (Netherlands) Graeme Rutjes (1990–1996)
- (Belgium) Enzo Scifo (1983–1987, 1997–2000)
- (Argentina) Matías Suárez (2008–2016)
- (Belgium) Youri Tielemans (2013–2017)
- (Belgium) Jean Thissen (1974–1979)
- (Belgium) Erwin Vandenbergh (1982–1986)
- (Belgium) René Vandereycken (1983–1986)
- (Netherlands) Adri van Tiggelen (1986–1991)
- (Belgium) Bruno Versavel (1992–1997)
- (Belgium) Jan Vertonghen (2022–2025)
- (Belgium) Johan Walem (1991–1997)
- (Poland) Marcin Wasilewski (2007–2013)
- (Czech Republic) Daniel Zítka (2002–2010)

== Club staff ==
As of 27 August 2026

Position	Staff
Head coach	(Portugal) Vítor Bruno
Assistant coaches	(Portugal) Vítor Gouveia (Portugal) Nuno Piloto (France) Jérémy Taravel
Sporting director	(France) Antoine Sibierski
Goalkeeper coaches	(Portugal) Luís Ferreira (Belgium) Justin Verlinden
Fitness coach	(Portugal) Pedro Oliveira
Performance director	(Belgium) Dries Bloemen
Performance data analyst	(Belgium) Dries Stessens
Strength and conditioning coach	(Belgium) Joris Jellacics
Video analysts	(Belgium) Victor Schmitt (Belgium) Raphael Mirra-Torres
Team manager	(Belgium) Martijn de Jonge
Assistant team manager	(Belgium) Jonas Verwerft
Team doctor	(Belgium) Luc Vanden Bossche
Head physio	(Belgium) Niels Mathieu
Physios	(Belgium) Vincent Adriaensen (Belgium) Simon Van Elewijck (Belgium) Brecht Van Isterdael
Masseur	(Belgium) Dimitri Van Boxtael
Dietician	(Belgium) Jana Camphens
Kit manager	(Belgium) Kalid Boudraa

== Club presidents ==
Anderlecht Ownership
Owner	President	From	To	Notes
(Belgium) Group Concordia	(Belgium) Charles Roos	1908	1911	
(Belgium) Group Concordia	(Belgium) Théo Verbeeck	1911	1951	Former club player
(Belgium)	(Belgium) Albert Roosens	1951	1971	Former club player
(Belgium) Constant Vanden Stock	(Belgium) Constant Vanden Stock	1971	1996	Belgium national team manager
(Belgium) Constant Vanden Stock	(Belgium) Roger Vanden Stock	1996	2008	
(Belgium) Roger Vanden Stock	(Belgium) Roger Vanden Stock	2008	2018	Son of Constant Vanden Stock
(Belgium) Marc Coucke	(Belgium) Marc Coucke	2018	2020	Entrepreneur
(Belgium) Marc Coucke	(Belgium) Wouter Vandenhaute	2020	2025	
(Belgium) Marc Coucke	(Belgium) Michael Verschueren	2025	Present	

== Managers ==
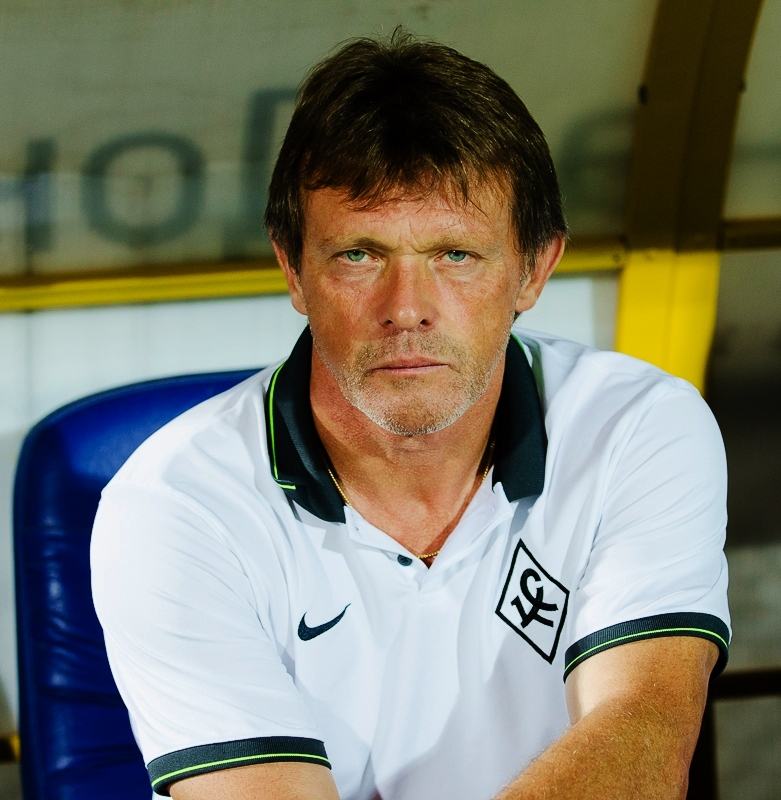
Franky Vercauteren, among others, had different spells as Anderlecht manager

There have been a total of 37 permanent managers and 3 caretaker managers of Anderlecht since the appointment of the first manager, Sylva Brébart, in 1920. The club's longest-serving manager is Englishman Bill Gormlie, who served during nine seasons between 1950 and 1959. Frenchman Georges Perino is the first Anderlecht manager to have claimed a trophy, with the first championship win in 1946–47. Seven Anderlecht managers have managed the club on two occasions: Ernest Churchill Smith, Pierre Sinibaldi, Urbain Braems, Raymond Goethals, Arie Haan, Johan Boskamp and Franky Vercauteren. Other managers have also played another role in the club before being appointed manager, including Jean Dockx, who served three times as caretaker before being appointed manager

== Youth academy ==
The youth complex is located in Neerpede, a district in Anderlecht. RSC Anderlecht has one of the most productive youth academies outside the Big Five. In August 2023, it was announced that head of youth development, Jean Kindermans, was leaving the team after 16 years. Under his leadership, youth players such as Romelu Lukaku, Youri Tielemans and Jérémy Doku made their breakthrough.

== Women's football team ==
In 1993, Brussels Dames 71 became Anderlecht's women team. The team has won ten Leagues, seven Super Leagues and eleven Belgian Cups since.

== Other sections ==
=== Rugby ===
The oldest, still active rugby team in Belgium is R.S.C. Anderlecht Rugby, established in 1931. The club won the Belgian Elite League for a record of 20 times.

=== Superleague Formula ===
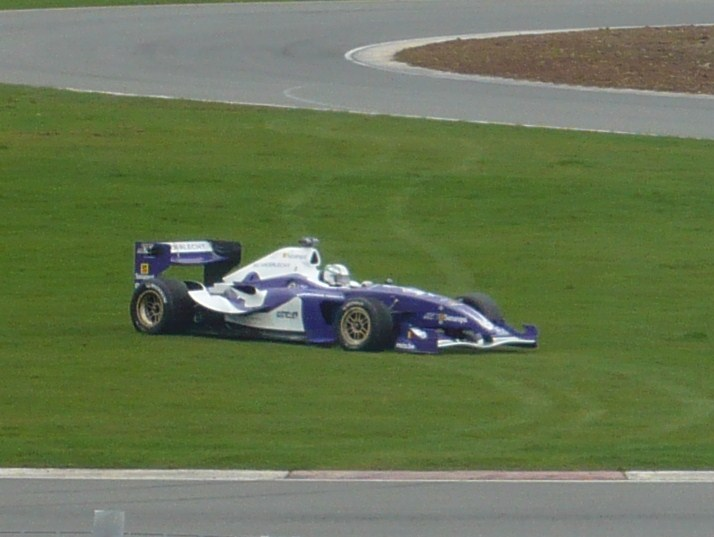
The Superleague Formula car

The Superleague Formula was a race class that existed between 2008 and 2011. The competition counted 16 to 19 teams, with every race car typically linked to an international football club. The team of R.S.C. Anderlecht won the championship in the 2010 season.

=== Futsal ===
For the 2022–23 season, RSC Anderlecht took over the Belgian First Division club FP Halle-Gooik and renamed it RSC Anderlecht Futsal.

At that time, the team was already a regular UEFA Futsal Champions League participant, and it had been in the top-10 of the UEFA Futsal Club Ranking continuously for the previous years.

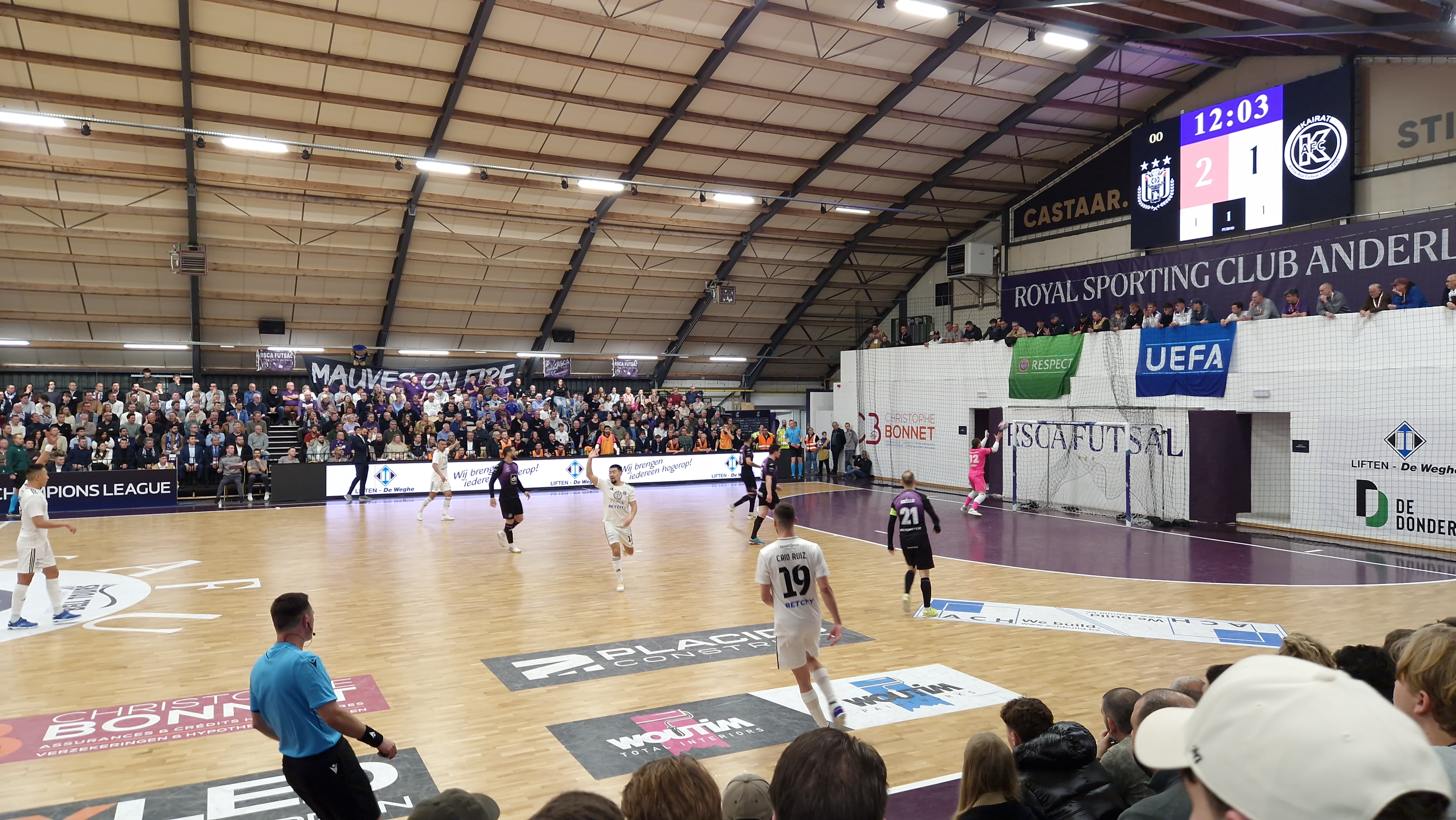
RSCA Futsal home game during the 2025–26 Champions League

The team plays in Roosdaal, at the Belleheide Center, a new arena with a capacity of 1,200 spectators.

RSCA Futsal hosted the venue for the main round of the 2022–23 UEFA Futsal Champions League. After advancing in the main round, they were able to beat the previous year's winner, FC Barcelona, in the elite round of the UEFA Futsal Champions League due to a better goal difference. Then the team advanced to the UEFA Champions League semifinals against Sporting Lisbon where they were eliminated.

In January 2024, RSCA Futsal was nominated for the prestigious Futsalplanet Awards, as one of the ten best men's clubs in the world.

== Bibliography ==
- Anderlecht Champion 1973–1974 by Frank Baudoncq in 1974, Arts et Voyages, 128 p. (in French)
- Anderlecht – La Chasse aux Titres by Frank Baudoncq in 1977, Gamma Sport, 176 p. (in French) ISBN 2801600997
- Anderlecht – Geschiedenis van een Grote Club by Eugene Steppe in 1977, Het Volk, 174 p. (in Dutch and French) ISBN 9062066224
- Rensenbrink Robby by Jacques Hereng, Rob Rensenbrink in 1977, Rossel, 124 p. (in French) ISBN 9789062065929
- Anderlecht Coupes Européennes 76 77 78 by Goethals in 1978, Rossel, 52 p. (in French)
- Haan-derlecht by Frank Baudoncq in 1979, Gamma, 188 p. (in French) ISBN 2713003601
- 100 Matches de Coupe d'Europe by Christian Hubert in 1981, Tournai, 176 p. (in French) ISBN 9782713004902
- Royal Sporting Club Anderlecht 1908–1983 75 Jaar Voetbal by Herman Pauwels, Frank Baudoncq, Albert Durenne & Jacques Levebvre in 1983, Gamma Sport, 154 p. (in Dutch and French) ISBN 2713005604
- Koning Anderlecht by Eddy Soetaert in 1987, Reinaert, 128 p. (in Dutch) ISBN 9063341016
- Anderlecht: L'apothéose Européenne by Michel Dubois in 1989, Reinaert, 193 p. (in French) ISBN 978-2713005855
- Anderlecht Uniek by Henry Guldemont in 1992, Roularta, 237 p. (in Dutch) ISBN 9054660368
- Constant vanden Stock – Een Leven, Twee Carrières by Hugo Camps & Philippe Majersdorf in 1993, Kritak, 155 p. (in Dutch) ISBN 9789060054536
- De Goden van Anderlecht by Frank Buyse & Henry Guldemont in 1995, Roularta, 156 p. (in Dutch) ISBN 9054662239
- Anderlecht in Europa : van Old Trafford tot San Siro by Rudy Nuyens in 1999, Globe, 304 p. (in Dutch) ISBN 9053121439
- 25 Titels. Een Levende Legende by Michel Dubois in 2000, Euro Images Productions, 210 p. (in Dutch and French) ISBN 9789076628103
- Mister Michel: De Zilveren Vos van Anderlecht by Stefan van Loock in 2004, Van Halewyck, 310 p. (in Dutch) ISBN 9789056175436
- Le Dictionnaire du RSC Anderlecht. Un Club de Légende, 557 Joueurs (2 Volumes) by Marcel Gallez & Johan Serkijn in 2008, Magnad, 486 p. (in French) ISBN 9782960072334
- 100 jaar Anderlecht by Stefan van Loock in 2008, Van Halewyck, 336 p. (in Dutch) ISBN 9789056178635
- De Overwinning in 100 Jaar (comic book) by Yves Duval, Jarry Charles in 2008, Dupuis, 46 p. (in Dutch and French) ISBN 9789081297813
- Circus Voetbal-Straffe Verhalen uit de Glorietijd van het Belgisch voetbal by Gilbert van Binst in 2009, Sport Voetbalmagazine, 303 p. (in Dutch) ISBN 9789086792252
- 11 RSC Anderlecht by Raf Willems in 2010, Lannoo, 176 p. (in Dutch) ISBN 9789020990805
- RSCA by Stijn Vanderhaeghe, David Steegen, Jan Mulder in 2013, Hannibal Books, 346 p. (in Dutch) ISBN 9789491376511
- Elke Dag een Wonder : Leven achter de Schermen van Paars-Wit by David Steegen in 2018, Borgerhoff & Lamberigts, 319 p. (in Dutch) ISBN 9789089318527
- RSC Anderlecht: 110 Jaar Voetbaltraditie by Sam van Clemen in 2019, Aspekt B.V., 360 p. (in Dutch) ISBN 9789463384889
- Eeuwige 25 van Anderlecht: van Mermans tot Kompany by Raf Willems in 2019, Willems Uitgevers, 100 p. (in Dutch) ISBN 9789492419651
- Gang of Brussels: L'histoire vraie de hooligans d'Anderlecht, entre foot et banditisme by Louis Dabir and Barthelemy Gaillard in 2020, Cherche Midi, 100 p. (in French) ISBN 9782749161624
- RSCA: We are Anderlecht! by Marc van Staen in 2021, Lannoo, 253 p. (in French and Dutch) ISBN 9789401474771
- Jef Mermans : Bombardier : de Voetballer die Anderlecht naar de Top Loodste by Stefan van Loock in 2022, Sportumi, 272 p. (in Dutch) ISBN 9789493242586
- Achter de Schermen bij Sporting Anderlecht by Hubert Lemaire in 2024, Lannoo, 192 p. (in Dutch) ISBN 9789401443821
