= André Piters =

Belgian footballer

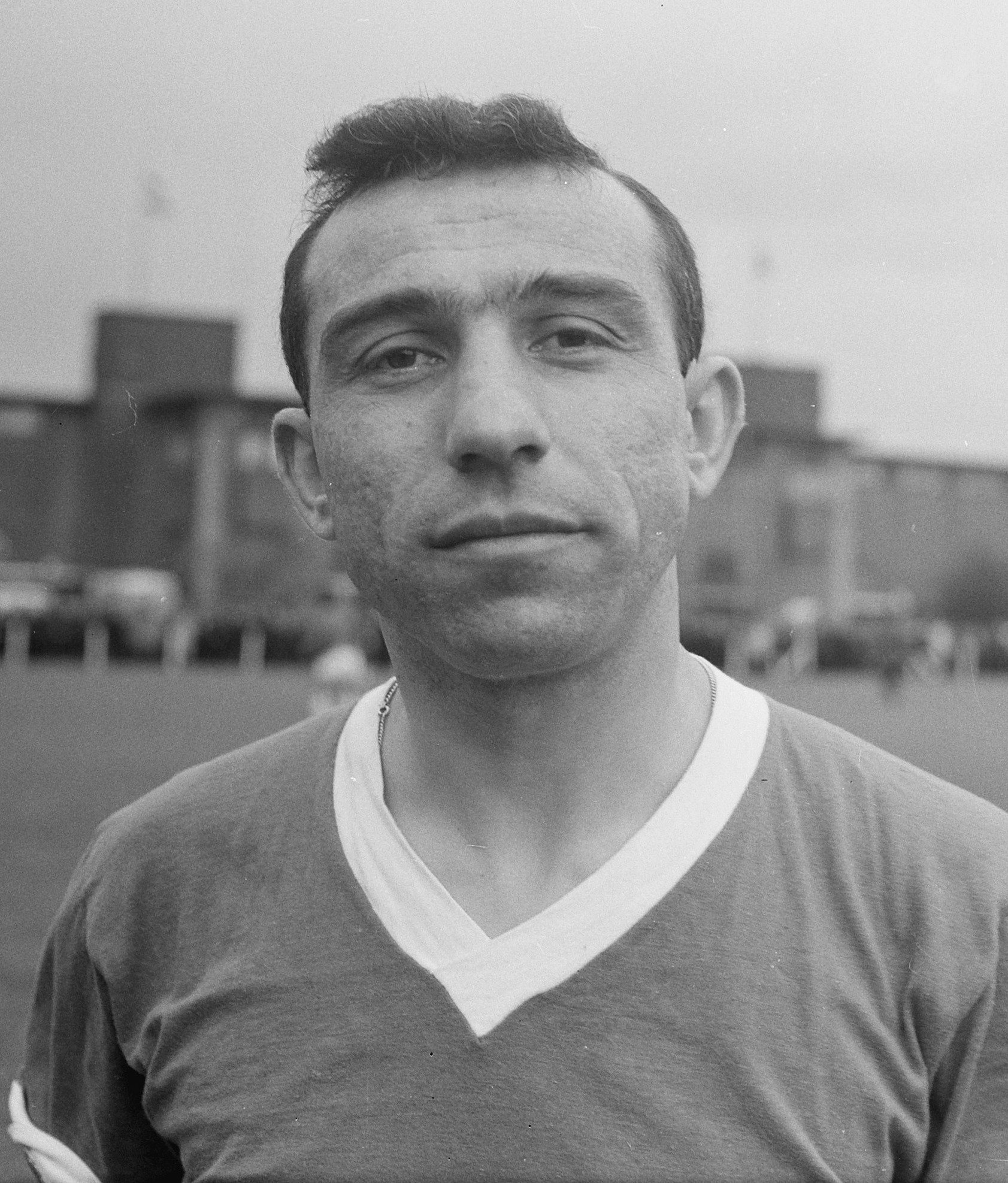
- Piters in 1965

Personal information
- Date of birth: 18 January 1931
- Place of birth: Herve, Belgium
- Date of death: 23 October 2014 (aged 83)
- Position: Striker

Senior career*
Years	Team	Apps	(Gls)
1948–1951	Herve		
1951–1961	Standard Liège	193	(54)
1961–1963	Olympic de Charleroi		
1963–1966	Fortuna 54		

International career
1955–1961	Belgium	23	(7)
- * Club domestic league appearances and goals

André Piters (18 January 1931 – 23 October 2014) was a Belgian footballer who played as a striker.

== Career ==
Piters played club football for Herve, Standard Liège, Olympic de Charleroi and Fortuna 54.

He earned a total of 23 caps for Belgium between 1955 and 1961, four of which came in FIFA World Cup qualifying matches.
