= 1967–68 Belgian First Division =

65th season of top-tier football in Belgium

Belgian First Division
- Season: 1967–68

Statistics of Belgian First Division in the 1967–68 season.

== Overview ==
Location of teams in Belgian First Division 1967–68

It was contested by 16 teams, and R.S.C. Anderlecht won the championship.

== League standings ==
Pos	Team	Pld	W	D	L	GF	GA	GD	Pts	Qualification or relegation
1	R.S.C. Anderlecht	30	20	6	4	67	24	+43	46	Qualified for 1968–69 European Cup
2	Club Brugge K.V.	30	19	7	4	53	21	+32	45	Qualified for 1968–69 European Cup Winners' Cup
3	Standard Liège	30	16	8	6	53	31	+22	40	Qualified for 1968–69 Inter-Cities Fairs Cup
4	K.S.V. Waregem	30	14	8	8	42	35	+7	36	Qualified for 1968–69 Inter-Cities Fairs Cup
5	K. Sint-Truidense V.V.	30	14	6	10	52	38	+14	34	
6	Beerschot	30	11	7	12	42	38	+4	29	Qualified for 1968–69 Inter-Cities Fairs Cup
7	Lierse S.K.	30	12	3	15	50	66	−16	27	
8	R. Charleroi S.C.	30	11	5	14	33	39	−6	27	
9	Daring Club Bruxelles	30	11	5	14	39	54	−15	27	Qualified for 1968–69 Inter-Cities Fairs Cup
10	R.F.C. de Liège	30	10	7	13	32	41	−9	27	
11	Racing White	30	9	9	12	41	44	−3	27	
12	Beringen FC	30	11	4	15	42	50	−8	26	
13	K.S.K. Beveren	30	9	7	14	30	42	−12	25	
14	KV Mechelen	30	9	5	16	32	41	−9	23	
15	Royal Antwerp FC	30	6	9	15	23	42	−19	21	Relegated to Belgian Second Division
16	R.O.C. de Charleroi-Marchienne	30	8	4	18	29	54	−25	20	Relegated to Belgian Second Division

== Results ==
Home \ Away	AND	ANT	BEE	BER	BEV	CLU	CHA	DAR	FCL	LIE	MEC	OLY	RRW	STA	STV	WAR
Anderlecht		5–0	3–1	2–0	2–0	1–1	2–0	2–0	1–0	2–0	4–2	4–1	4–2	4–0	5–1	5–0
Antwerp	2–3		0–0	1–2	0–0	0–2	0–0	2–5	1–1	3–1	1–2	2–0	0–2	0–0	3–1	3–1
Beerschot	2–0	3–1		3–0	2–0	0–0	3–0	3–3	3–0	2–4	1–1	5–0	2–1	2–1	0–2	0–0
Beringen	2–0	0–1	0–0		2–0	0–1	1–2	3–1	1–0	5–3	3–0	2–5	4–3	1–3	2–1	4–2
Beveren	1–2	0–1	3–2	1–1		1–2	2–0	2–0	2–1	0–3	0–0	0–1	0–2	1–1	3–1	1–3
Club Brugge	2–2	1–0	3–1	3–1	1–0		1–0	4–1	4–2	3–1	5–0	3–0	0–0	2–0	0–0	2–1
Charleroi	1–3	1–1	1–0	2–0	5–2	1–0		0–0	0–0	4–2	1–0	2–1	1–3	0–1	2–0	2–3
Daring Club	1–0	1–0	2–0	0–2	0–0	1–4	5–0		3–1	1–0	1–0	1–0	3–2	0–4	0–1	1–1
Liège	0–3	2–0	1–0	1–1	2–0	0–2	2–0	4–4		2–0	1–0	2–1	1–0	1–1	2–1	0–0
Lierse	2–4	4–1	3–1	1–0	0–0	3–1	3–1	2–1	3–2		1–0	5–1	5–2	2–2	0–5 (Note: Lierse loses its last two home matches by forfeit "for having fielded an unqualified player". May 19, 1968 against Sint-Truiden (ground victory 3–1) and a week later against Waregem (ground victory 1–0). This last part stopped on January 21 and then reprogrammed initially on April 6 had been postponed once again.)	0–5
Mechelen	0–0	2–0	1–2	3–1	1–2	0–2	0–1	3–1	4–1	4–0		1–2	2–1	1–2	0–1	0–1
Olympic Charleroi	1–0	0–0	2–0	3–2	0–2	1–1	0–3	0–1	0–1	3–0	0–0		0–1	1–2	1–3	1–0
Racing White	1–1	2–0	1–4	0–0	1–2	0–0	1–0	2–0	1–1	2–2	2–2	3–1		0–1	2–2	2–0
Standard Liège	0–0	0–0	2–0	2–1	3–0	1–2	3–2	4–1	2–1	4–0	3–0	3–1	2–0		2–2	1–2
Sint-Truiden	0–2	0–0	3–0	4–0	1–1	2–1	2–0	3–2	2–0	4–0	1–2	1–1	4–2	3–2		0–1
Waregem	1–1	1–0	0–0	2–1	2–4	1–0	1–1	5–2	1–0	1–0	0–1	1–1	0–0	1–1	2–1	

Legend: Blue = home team win; Yellow = draw; Red = away team win.
