= 1963–64 Belgian First Division =

61st season of top-tier football in Belgium

Belgian First Division
- Season: 1963–64

Statistics of Belgian First Division in the 1963–64 season.

== Overview ==
Location of teams in Belgian First Division 1963–64

It was contested by 16 teams, and R.S.C. Anderlecht won the championship.

== League standings ==
Pos	Team	Pld	W	D	L	GF	GA	GD	Pts	Qualification or relegation
1	R.S.C. Anderlecht	30	18	9	3	77	28	+49	45	Qualified for 1964–65 European Cup
2	Beringen FC	30	16	9	5	49	30	+19	41	
3	Standard Liège	30	16	8	6	58	28	+30	40	
4	Beerschot	30	12	13	5	47	26	+21	37	
5	R.F.C. de Liège	30	15	6	9	39	27	+12	36	Qualified for 1964–65 Inter-Cities Fairs Cup
6	Royal Antwerp FC	30	13	9	8	42	38	+4	35	Qualified for 1964–65 Inter-Cities Fairs Cup
7	KFC Diest	30	13	7	10	43	39	+4	33	
8	La Gantoise	30	10	6	14	37	51	−14	26	Qualified for 1964–65 European Cup Winners' Cup
9	Lierse S.K.	30	8	10	12	39	43	−4	26	
10	Cercle Brugge K.S.V.	30	8	10	12	25	43	−18	26	
11	Daring Club Bruxelles	30	8	9	13	41	48	−7	25	
12	Club Brugge K.V.	30	8	8	14	35	48	−13	24	
13	K. Sint-Truidense V.V.	30	8	8	14	36	50	−14	24	
14	K.V. Turnhout	30	7	10	13	28	50	−22	24	Relegated to Division II (Note: Expelled for corruption)
15	K. Berchem Sport	30	8	6	16	29	49	−20	22	
16	KV Mechelen	30	3	10	17	20	47	−27	16	Relegated to Division II

== Results ==
Home \ Away	AND	ANT	BEE	BRC	BER	CER	CLU	DAR	DIE	GNT	FCL	LIE	MEC	STA	STV	TUR
Anderlecht		3–3	1–1	2–0	6–0	4–1	3–0	1–1	3–0	1–1	2–0	1–1	3–1	0–0	3–0	8–1
Antwerp	2–1		1–1	2–1	0–3	3–1	0–1	4–0	1–0	1–1	1–0	1–1	2–1	1–1	1–1	3–1
Beerschot	1–1	0–0		0–0	3–0	2–0	2–0	1–1	0–0	4–1	0–0	1–0	0–0	0–3	1–1	4–0
Berchem	2–3	1–0	1–4		1–3	2–1	2–1	0–3	1–2	3–2	2–0	0–0	1–0	2–1	1–1	0–2
Beringen	3–3	3–0	2–0	3–0		1–1	1–0	1–0	0–0	5–0	2–2	1–0	0–0	2–0	1–0	0–0
Cercle Brugge	4–2	1–0	0–0	2–1	0–2		2–1	0–2	0–3	1–2	2–0	0–0	0–0	0–0	2–0	1–1
Club Brugge	0–5	1–3	0–3	2–1	1–1	1–1		4–1	1–1	1–2	1–0	2–1	2–0	1–3	4–0	0–0
Daring Club	0–1	3–1	0–2	2–1	3–3	2–0	2–2		5–0	3–0	0–3	5–3	2–2	1–1	1–2	1–2
Diest	0–3	0–1	6–5	1–1	2–1	4–0	3–1	1–1		2–1	3–1	0–3	2–1	4–0	1–0	3–0
La Gantoise	0–6	0–2	0–0	1–1	2–0	1–1	2–0	2–0	4–1		4–1	0–2	1–0	0–2	1–2	2–1
Liège	3–1	1–0	1–0	2–1	1–2	3–0	2–1	2–0	1–1	2–0		2–1	3–0	1–0	4–1	2–0
Lierse	0–2	1–1	1–4	0–2	1–2	0–0	0–3	3–1	0–0	1–1	2–0		0–0	5–1	3–2	4–0
Mechelen	0–2	2–3	1–4	0–0	0–1	1–1	0–0	4–0	0–2	1–3	0–2	2–0		0–3	2–0	0–0
Standard Liège	2–2	6–1	2–0	2–1	3–0	4–0	2–2	1–0	2–1	1–0	0–0	5–1	6–0		2–1	2–0
Sint-Truiden	0–1	1–3	2–3	3–0	1–1	1–2	1–1	1–1	1–0	4–3	0–0	3–3	3–1	2–0		3–0
Turnhout	1–3	1–1	1–1	4–0	0–5 (Note: The match between Turnhout and Beringen for the account of the 24th day, ended in a victory (2–0) for the home team. But following a corruption scandal, the federation transformed the result of this match into a forfeit (0–5) in favor of the away club.)	0–1	3–0	0–0	1–0	2–0	0–0	1–2	1–1	2–2	2–0	

Legend: Blue = home team win; Yellow = draw; Red = away team win.

== Attendances ==
#	Football club	Home games	Average attendance
1	RSC Anderlecht	15	21,667
2	Standard de Liège	15	16,133
3	Club Brugge	15	13,000
4	RFC Liège	15	11,800
5	Beerschot	15	11,533
6	Beringen FC	15	10,000
7	KV Turnhout	15	9,600
8	La Gantoise	15	9,333
9	KV Mechelen	15	8,533
10	STVV	15	8,433
11	Royal Antwerp FC	15	8,400
12	KFC Diest	15	7,900
13	RDCB	15	7,400
14	Lierse SK	15	6,567
15	Cercle Brugge	15	6,433
16	Berchem Sport	15	5,500
