= 1961–62 Belgian First Division =

59th season of top-tier football in Belgium

Belgian First Division
- Season: 1961–62

Statistics of Belgian First Division in the 1961–62 season.

== Overview ==
Location of teams in Belgian First Division 1961–62

It was contested by 16 teams, and R.S.C. Anderlecht won the championship.

== League standings ==
Pos	Team	Pld	W	D	L	GF	GA	GD	Pts	Qualification or relegation
1	R.S.C. Anderlecht	30	21	7	2	75	29	+46	49	Qualified for 1962–63 European Cup
2	Standard Liège	30	18	4	8	57	31	+26	40	
3	Royal Antwerp FC	30	15	10	5	67	43	+24	40	
4	R.F.C. de Liège	30	13	10	7	34	24	+10	36	
5	Club Brugge K.V.	30	13	9	8	41	34	+7	35	
6	Daring Club Bruxelles	30	11	8	11	46	47	−1	30	
7	La Gantoise	30	11	7	12	41	48	−7	29	
8	K. Sint-Truidense V.V.	30	9	9	12	50	45	+5	27	
9	Beerschot	30	8	11	11	32	36	−4	27	
10	Royale Union Saint-Gilloise	30	10	6	14	36	39	−3	26	Qualified for 1962–63 Inter-Cities Fairs Cup
11	Lierse S.K.	30	10	6	14	49	58	−9	26	
12	KFC Diest	30	9	7	14	40	52	−12	25	
13	R.O.C. de Charleroi-Marchienne	30	8	9	13	37	39	−2	25	
14	Cercle Brugge K.S.V.	30	9	6	15	39	64	−25	24	
15	K. Waterschei S.V. Thor Genk	30	8	8	14	43	61	−18	24	Relegated to Division II
16	Eendracht Alost	30	6	5	19	25	62	−37	17	Relegated to Division II

== Results ==
Home \ Away	AAL	AND	ANT	BEE	CER	CLU	DAR	DIE	GNT	FCL	LIE	OLY	STA	STV	USG	WTG
Eendracht Alost		0–0	1–2	0–0	0–1	0–1	1–3	1–2	0–1	0–2	1–0	0–2	0–5 (Note: The match between Eendracht Aalst and Standard Liège was stopped when the score was 0–3. The Sporting Committee inflicted a forfeit score (0–5) in favor of the people of Liège.)	3–2	2–0	2–0
Anderlecht	2–0		3–5	1–1	2–1	2–0	2–0	3–2	4–2	1–0	1–1	3–0	2–0	3–2	1–1	6–1
Antwerp	7–0	1–4		0–1	5–1	1–1	3–1	2–2	2–1	3–1	1–1	0–3	2–0	1–1	2–1	5–2
Beerschot	1–1	1–5	1–1		3–0	1–0	3–2	3–0	5–0	1–2	2–2	2–0	0–1	0–1	2–1	0–2
Cercle Brugge	5–0	0–3	3–1	0–0		0–2	0–4	3–1	1–3	3–0	1–2	1–1	2–1	0–0	1–4	5–1
Club Brugge	1–0	1–1	0–2	1–0	1–1		1–1	3–0	2–1	1–1	1–4	3–0	3–2	2–2	3–1	1–0
Daring Club	3–0	0–2	1–4	3–1	5–0	1–1		1–0	0–0	1–2	1–2	1–3	3–5	1–1	1–0	2–1
Diest	2–3	0–3	1–1	0–0	2–0	0–4	3–1		4–2	1–0	0–0	2–2	0–1	2–2	3–1	5–3
La Gantoise	2–1	1–5	2–6	3–0	0–1	0–0	2–2	1–0		0–0	3–1	2–0	0–2	3–0	0–1	2–2
Liège	2–1	1–2	0–0	2–0	3–0	1–0	0–0	1–1	4–0		1–0	2–0	1–0	2–1	0–0	0–2
Lierse	2–3	2–3	5–1	2–1	3–5	2–1	1–2	1–2	2–1	2–2		1–0	2–1	1–3	1–0	2–4
Olympic Charleroi	0–0	1–3	2–2	0–0	7–2	2–2	3–0	1–2	0–0	0–0	4–1		1–2	0–2	1–0	3–0
Standard Liège	3–1	2–1	0–0	1–1	7–1	3–0	1–1	4–3	0–0	2–1	4–1	1–0		2–0	2–0	2–0
Sint-Truiden	5–1	3–3	2–3	1–2	0–0	1–2	3–0	2–0	1–2	0–1	3–3	3–0	3–1		1–3	4–1
Union SG	4–1	0–0	1–3	3–0	1–1	1–2	2–3	1–0	1–4	0–0	3–1	1–0	0–2	2–0		2–1
Waterschei Thor	3–2	0–4	1–1	1–1	2–0	3–1	1–2	2–0	1–3	2–2	3–1	1–1	2–0	1–1	1–1	

Legend: Blue = home team win; Yellow = draw; Red = away team win.
