= Harry Menzies =

Scottish footballer (1879–1932)

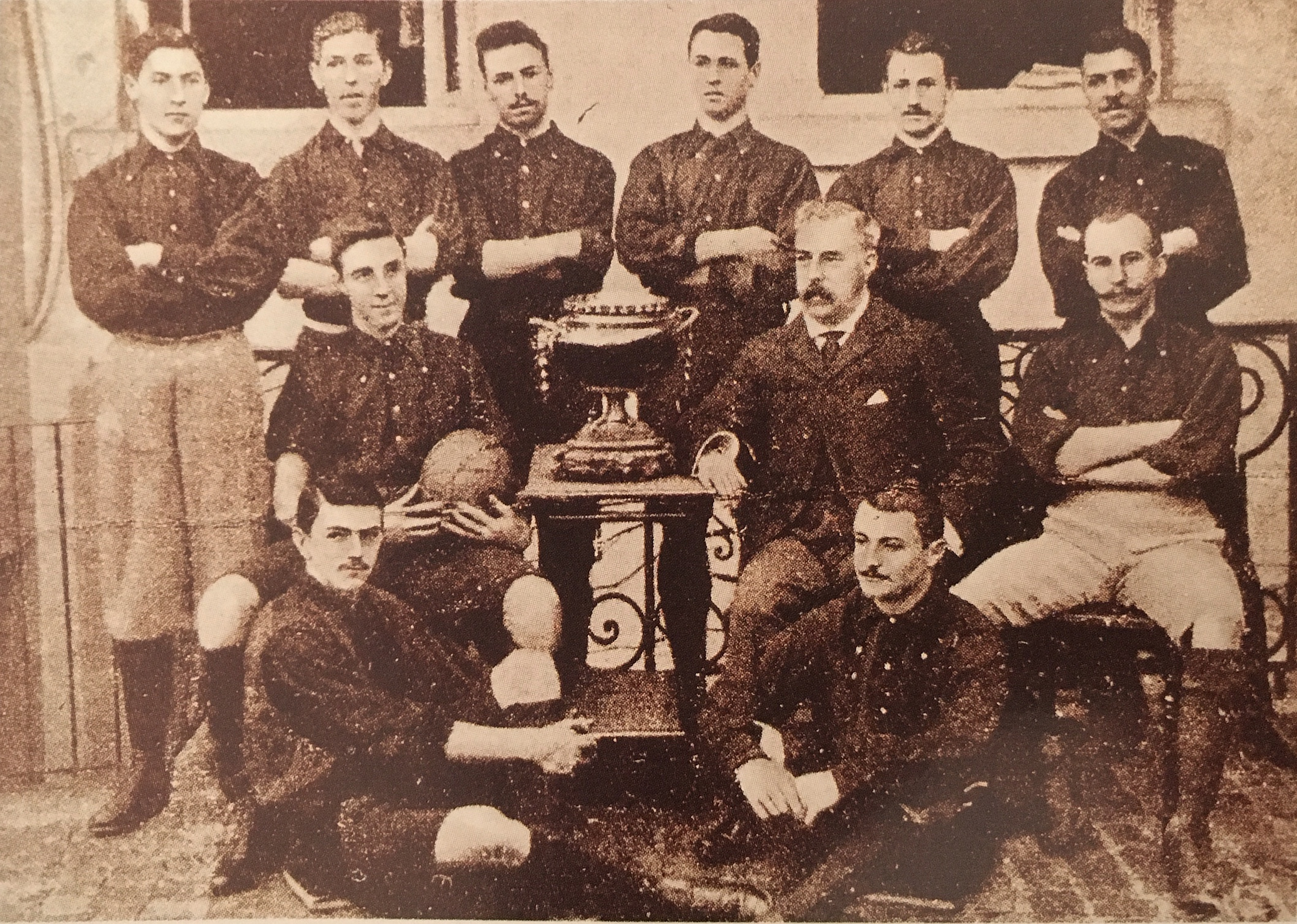
- Menzies (standing, second from left) in 1896

Personal information
- Birth name: Henry Edward Menzies
- Date of birth: 1 August 1879
- Place of birth: Liège, Belgium
- Date of death: 1932 (aged 52-53)
- Place of death: Unknown
- Position: Defender

Senior career*
Years	Team	Apps	(Gls)
1895–1902	FC Liégeois		
1902–1904	Beerschot AC		
–1906	Arthurlie		
1906–1907	Crystal Palace	4	(0)

International career
1901	Belgium	1	(0)
- * Club domestic league appearances and goals

Henry Edward Menzies, better known as Harry Menzies (1 August 1879 – 1932), was a Scottish footballer who played as a defender for the Belgian sides FC Liégeois and Beerschot AC between 1895 and 1904, and for the British sides Arthurlie and Crystal Palace for the 1906–07 season.

== Early life ==
Henry Edward Menzies was born in Liège on 1 August 1879, as the son of Emily Mary Chambers and Ronald Sutherland Menzies, who had been born in 1846 in Lee, then in Kent, now a London suburb.

He was the second of seven children, of whom six survived to adulthood, with all of his siblings being born and raised in Liège, including Guy (1878–1944) and Frédéric (1883–1952). His father moved to Liège in the early 1890s, becoming the president of Belgian football club FC Liégeois, which had been founded by Englishmen in 1892. In 1903, his father became the British vice-consul in the city.

== Playing career ==
Menzies began his football career with his local club FC Liégeois in mid-1895, at the age of 16, helping his side win the very first Belgian championship in 1895–96. He played a crucial role in the Liégeois side that won back-to-back league titles in 1897–98 and 1898–99, starting in both legs of the 1899 championship final against FC Brugeois, in which he kept a clean-sheet in the first leg in an eventual 6–3 aggregate victory. During this period, Liégeois had an unbeaten run of 23 official matches that lasted over two years, between 28 February 1897 and 12 November 1899, coming to an end at the hands of Antwerp FC; Menzies had scored twice to put his side 2–0 up, but Liégeois still lost 3–5.

Menzies stayed loyal to Liégeois for seven years until 1902, and during his last season at the club, he played alongside two of his brothers, Guy and Frédéric, the latter having just joined. In 1902, he moved to Beerschot AC, and in doing so, he became the very first player to feature in both clubs; he stayed there for two years, until 1904. In that year, his name disappeared from the line-ups of Belgian clubs, either because he retired from football, at the age of only 25, or because he left Belgium to return to his homeland of Scotland, and likewise, a few years later, he was playing for Scottish club Arthurlie. He was most likely still in good shape since in 1906, the 27-year-old Menzies was signed by Crystal Palace, for whom he made only four appearances during the 1906–07 season.

== International career ==
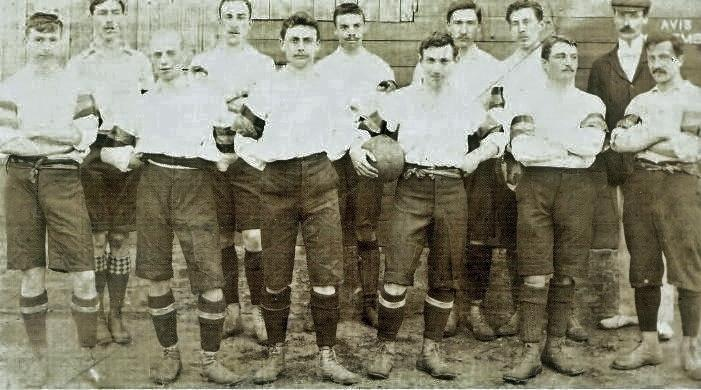
The first-ever Belgium national team in 1901. Menzies (second from left) in 1901.

Menzies participated in the first match of a Belgian national team at the 1901 Coupe Vanden Abeele on 28 April, helping his side to an 8–0 trashing of a third-rate Dutch side. He was one of the three Liégeois players to feature in this match, the others being Fernand Defalle and Lucien Londot; however, this match is not officially recognized by FIFA because of the presence of foreign players in the Belgium side, including Menzies.

== Death ==
Menzies had a child named Alan, born in 1909.

Menzies died in 1932, at the age of either 52 or 53.

== Honours ==
FC Liégeois

- Belgian Championship:
  - Champions (3): 1896, 1898, and 1899
