= Alfred Grisar =

Belgian polo player

Personal information
- Full name: Alfred Félix Grisar
- Date of birth: 22 July 1881
- Place of birth: Antwerp, Belgium
- Date of death: 27 November 1958 (aged 77)
- Place of death: Wilrijk, Belgium
- Position: Goalkeeper

Senior career*
Years	Team	Apps	(Gls)
- Antwerp FC
1900–1903	Beerschot AC		

International career
1902	Belgium (unofficial)	1	(0)
Medal record
Men's Polo
Representing Belgium
Olympic Games
Bronze medal – third place	1920 Antwerp	Team
- * Club domestic league appearances and goals

Alfred Félix Grisar (22 July 1881 – 27 November 1958) was one of the most important pioneers in the sporting history of Belgium, most notably in polo, being known as "The Father of Belgian Polo", and football, being the fundamental head behind the foundation of Beerschot AC in 1899, for whom he played as a goalkeeper. He competed in the polo tournament at the 1920 Summer Olympics.

== Early and personal life ==
Alfred Grisar was born in Antwerp on 22 July 1881, to Belgian industrialist Ernest Grisar and Adèle Marie Justine Constance van den Nest, and as the son of a well-off family, he was sent to Britain to complete his studies, doing so in a college in Brighton.

Grisar married Elisa Eugénie Louise Léonie Elsen (1884–1955) on 7 February 1907, and they divorced 13 years later, on 3 December 1920.

== Sporting career ==
=== Football career ===
In 1895, his father purchased an old racecourse near the "Beerschothof" park in Kiel, in the south of Antwerp, which consisted of a 19-hectare plot of land with stables, changing rooms, chalet, and a grandstand, and when Alfred saw these facilities in 1899, he quickly realized its potential as a multi-sports club, and immediately suggested this idea to his father, who approves it, and hence Beerschot Athletic Club is born on 3 September 1899. His father died a few weeks later in November, so Alfred became the owner of the facilities and the club, which he named Beerschot because of a nearby wooded park called "Beerschotshof", and which had departments in field hockey, polo, cricket, tennis, athletics and football.

Grisar sought advice for his start in management and surrounded himself with friends to help him, giving each of them a sports section to manage, but choosing his favorite sport for himself, football, whose section was started in February 1900, and then officially registered in July of that year. Grisar recruited ao many of the Antwerp players that Antwerp was unable to continue in the highest division and withdrew temporarily from the league. Among the players who moved were the Potts brothers (Herbert and Walter), the Robyns brothers (Jan and Paul), with Herbert Potts and Jan Robyns being named captain and vice-captain of the football team, who played their first match on 6 May 1900, in a friendly game against the Antwerp Reserves.

On 15 May, Beerschot officially became a member of the Belgian FA, which allowed them to participate in the 1900–01 Belgian First Division, making their official debut on 21 October 1900, in which Grisar started as a goalkeeper and helped his club to a 10–2 victory over FC Brugeois. In its first season in 1900–01, Beerschot became vice-champions of Belgium, falling just one point short of the winners Racing.

In early 1901, Beerschot AC was the driving force behind what is now considered the first-ever (unofficial) match between the national teams of Belgium and the Netherlands, which was held in the club's field on 28 April. The two sides contested the so-called Coupe Vanden Abeele, which was offered by Beerschot's secretary Frédéric Vanden Abeele, and Grisar himself featured as Belgium's goalkeeper in the second match on 5 January 1902, in which he kept a clean sheet in a 2–0 win.

Following the Olympic Games in Stockholm, the Beerschot stadium was renovated to meet Olympic requirements to host the 1920 edition in Antwerp, with Alfred Grisar and Beerschot chairman Paul Havenith being part of the committee that worked to bring the Olympic Games to Antwerp.
