= Ronald Menzies =

Scottish football executive (1846–1903)

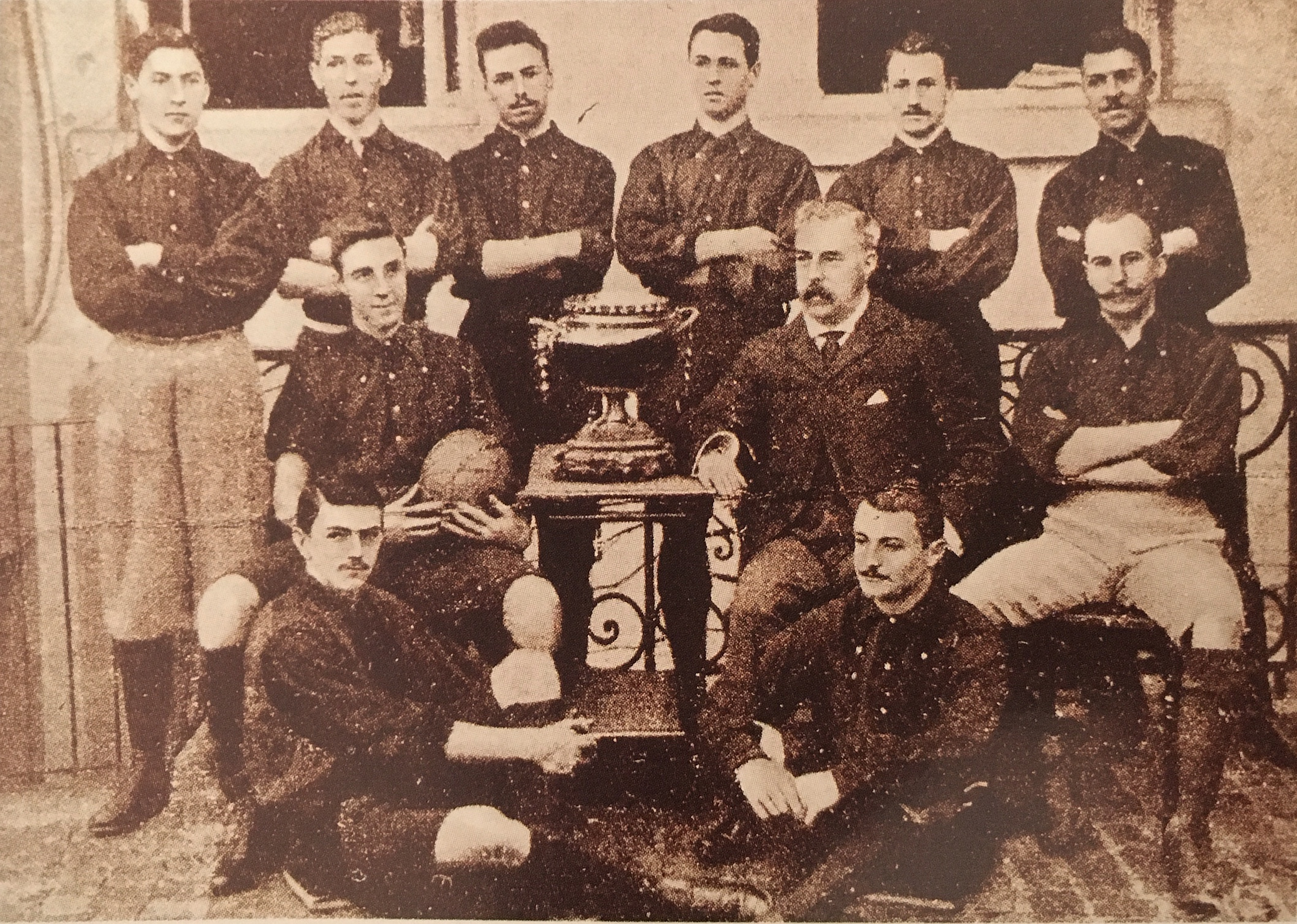
- Menzies (in the center) in 1896
- Born: Ronald Sutherland Menzies; 1846; Lee, London, England
- Died: 1903 (aged 56–57); Unknown
- Citizenship: Scottish
- Occupations: Football executive; City counciler
- Known for: President of FC Liégeois

President of FC Liégeois
- Preceded by: 1896
- Succeeded by: 1903

British vice-council in Liège
- In office 1903–1903

Ronald Sutherland Menzies (1846 – 1903) was a Scottish football executive who served as the president of Belgian club FC Liégeois from 1896 to 1903. He was a prominent citizen in Liège, thus becoming the British vice-consul of the city.

== Early and personal life ==
Ronald Sutherland Menzies was born in 1846 in Lee, then in Kent, now a London suburb, as the son of James Sutherland Menzies (1806–1886), from Finsbury, and Louisa Caroline Amelia Seyffert (1814–1891). His grandfather, Peter Patrick Menzies (1777–1813), was originally from Perth, Scotland. He studied at Acton School before going up to the Magdalene College, Cambridge.

On 7 April 1877, Menzies married Emily Mary Chambers in Kensington, and the couple then moved to Liège shortly after since their eldest son, Ronald Sutherland Guy (1878–1944), was already born there. The couple then had a further six children, Henry, Jack Monro (1880–1930), Ethol Emily (1881–1975), Frédéric Alfred (1883–1952), Alan James (1884–1943), and Charles Murray (1885–1957), with all but one being born in Liège.

== Sporting career ==
Before leaving London, Menzies brought a football ball with him, and from the mid-1880s onwards, on every Sunday morning, he would teach his four eldest sons, Ronald (Guy), Henry (Harry), Jack, and Frédéric, the practice of football, a sport that was practically unknown in the city at the time. Eventually, he began taking them to the Parc de la Boverie, which became the home for the first football players in the region. The Boverie also housed a velodrome, and therefore, his sons might have developed a deep interest for cycling as well, especially Jack, since he never played football in his adult life.

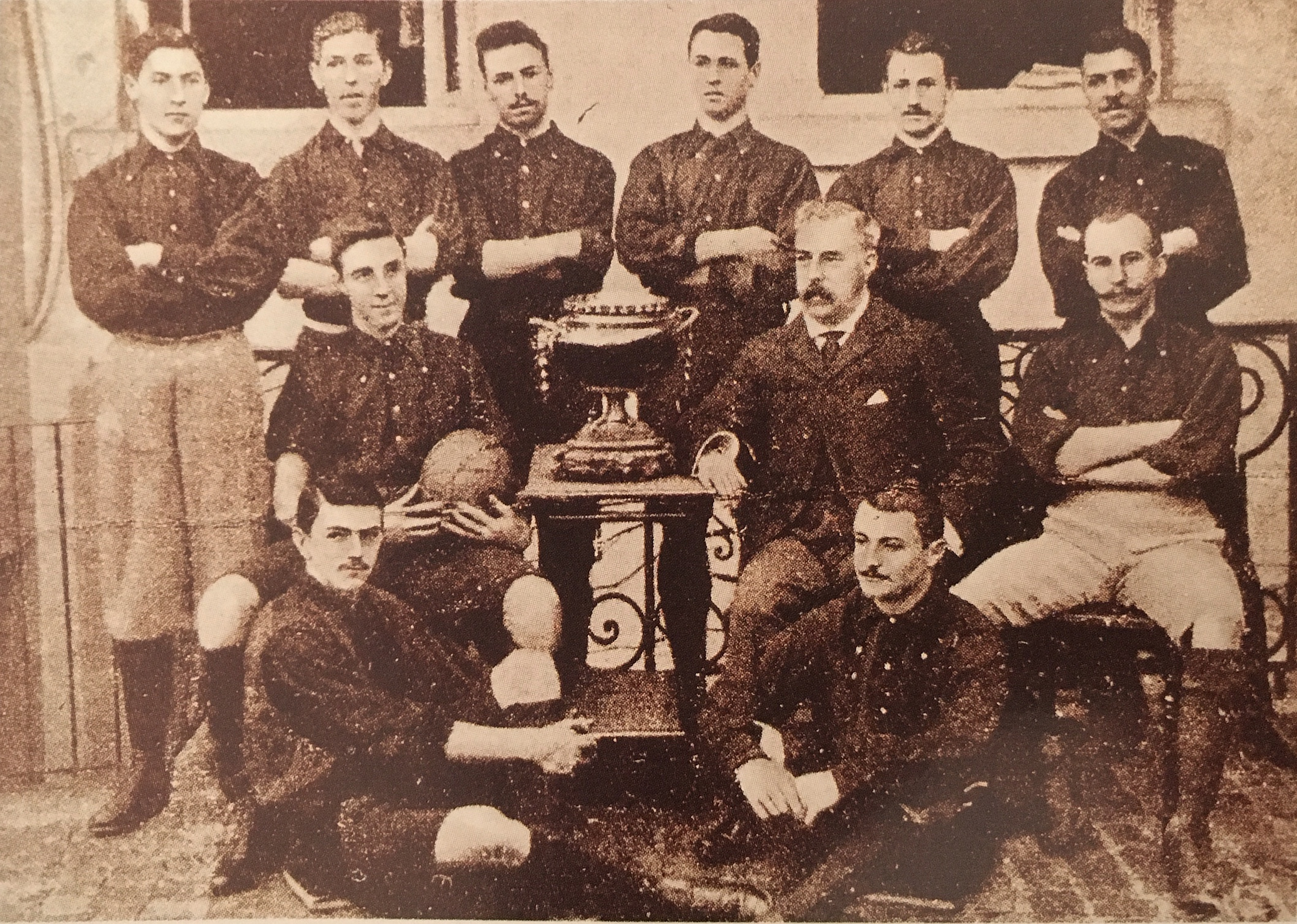
Menzies (in the center) and the squad of Liégeois, including his son Harry (standing, second from left), shortly after winning the inaugural championship in 1896.

On 14 February 1892, members of the Liège Cyclist's Union founded the Liège Football Club, and Menzies was certainly quick to make his registration in the club, thus becoming one of Liégeois' first members. At some point in early 1896, Menzies became the club's president, and he immediately led his team to a title, the inaugural national championship of Belgium in 1895–96, thus becoming first-ever Belgian Champion. Most of the members of that first squad were Belgian, but also had Englishmen, such as Samuel Hickson, who was the top scorer of the inaugural edition, and his son Harry, aged only 18.

Liège won back-to-back titles in 1898 and 1899, beating FC Brugeois 6–3 in the two-legged final of 1899. During this period, Liégeois had an unbeaten run of 23 official matches that lasted over two years, between 28 February 1897 and 12 November 1899, coming to an end at the hands of Antwerp FC, in a match in which his son Harry scored the opening two goals in an eventual 5–3 loss. In the 1901–02 season, Menzies had three of his sons playing in the club's first team, Guy, Harry, and the teenager Frédéric. In 1902, Harry left Liégeois to join club rivals Beerschot AC, and in doing so, he became the first player to play for both clubs.

== Later life ==
At the turn of the century, Menzies already was a prominent citizen in Liège, having lived there for over two decades by then, and thus, in 1903, he became the British vice-consul of the city; however, he died shortly thereafter.
