= Fernand Defalle =

Belgian footballer

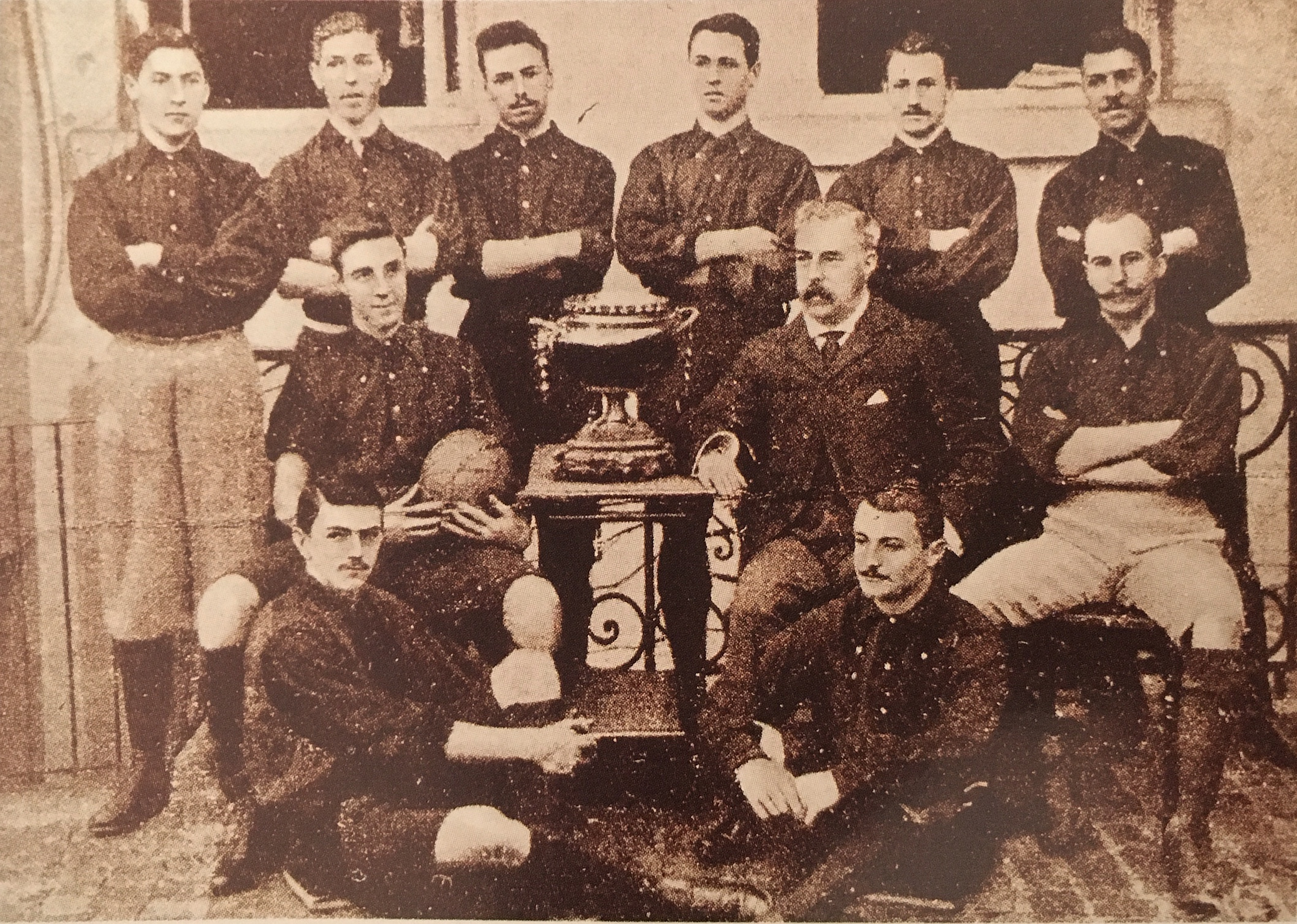
- Defalle (standing, third from left) in 1896

Personal information
- Place of birth: Belgium
- Position: Goalkeeper

Senior career*
Years	Team	Apps	(Gls)
1895–1905	FC Liégeois		
1905–1910	Racing de Bruxelles		

International career
1901	Belgium XI (unofficial)	1	(0)

Managerial career
- 1900–1902: FC Liégeois
- * Club domestic league appearances and goals

Fernand Defalle was a Belgian footballer who played as a goalkeeper for Belgian clubs FC Liégeois and Racing de Bruxelles between 1895 and 1904.

== Career ==
Defalle began his career at FC Liégeois in 1895, helping his side win the inaugural Belgian championship in 1895–96. He played a crucial role in the Liégeois side that won back-to-back league titles in 1897–98 and 1898–99, starting in both legs of the 1899 championship final against FC Brugeois, in which he kept a clean-sheet in the first leg in an eventual 6–3 aggregate victory. During this period, Liégeois had an unbeaten run of 23 official matches that lasted over two years, between 28 February 1897 and 12 November 1899, coming to an end in a 5–3 loss to Antwerp FC. Defalle did not play this match, and without him, the champions proved unable to withstand the constant pressure from the local footballers. He stayed at the club for a decade until 1905, when he left for Racing de Bruxelles, where he retired five years later in 1910.

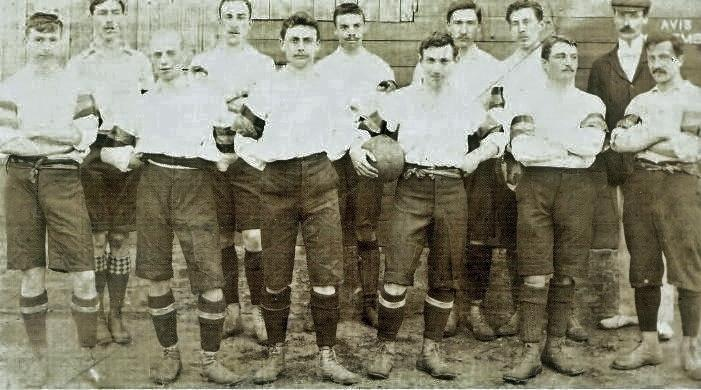
The first-ever Belgium national team in 1901. Defalle can be seen in the back, the third from the left.

On 28 April 1901, Defalle participated in the very first match of a Belgian national team at the 1901 Coupe Vanden Abeele, keeping a clean sheet in an 8–0 trashing of a third-rate Dutch side. He was one of the three Liégeois players to feature in this match, the others being Harry Menzies and Lucien Londot; however, this match is not officially recognized by FIFA because of the presence of foreign players in the Belgium side, including Menzies.

Defalle also worked in Liégeois as a player-coach for two years, replacing Fred Chartres in 1900, and being replaced by Lucien Londot in 1902.

== Honours ==
FC Liégeois

- Belgian Championship: 1896, 1898, 1899
