= Ernest Moreau de Melen =

Belgian footballer

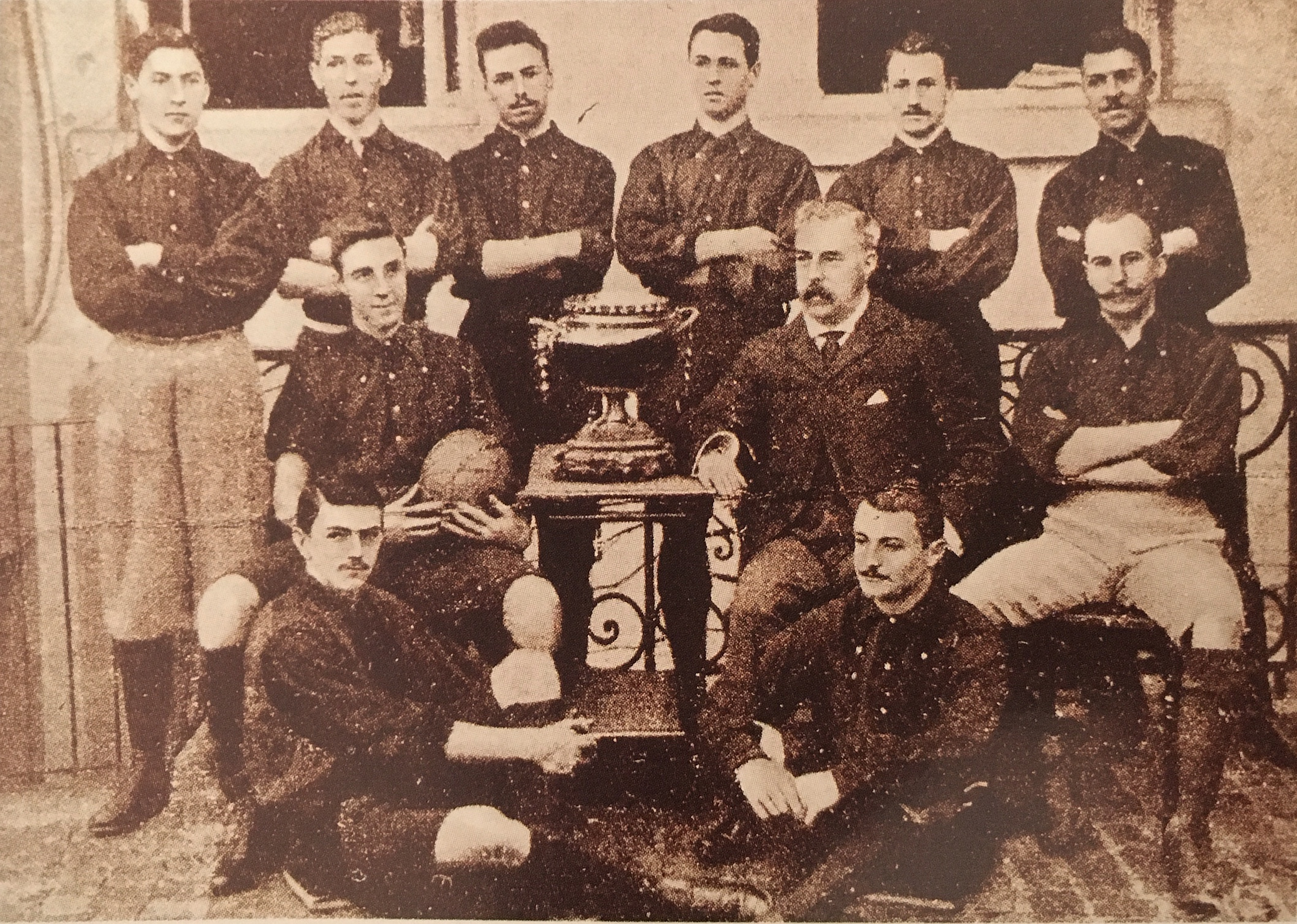
- Moreau de Melen (standing, first from left) in 1896

Personal information
- Full name: Ernest Marie Eugène Adolphe Moreau de Melen
- Date of birth: 20 February 1879
- Place of birth: Liège, Belgium
- Date of death: 17 January 1968 (aged 88)
- Position: 1

Senior career*
Years	Team	Apps	(Gls)
1895–1907	FC Liégeois		

International career
1900	Belgium Olympic	1	(0)
1904	Belgium (unofficial)	1	(0)
1905	Belgium	1	(0)
Medal record
Men's football
Representing Belgium
Olympic Games
Gold medal – first place	1900 Paris	Team
- * Club domestic league appearances and goals

Ernest Moreau de Melen (20 February 1879 – 17 January 1979) was a Belgian footballer who played for FC Liégeois between 1895 and 1907, and who competed in the 1900 Olympic Games, winning a bronze medal as a member of a mixed team representing Belgium that was mostly made-up of students from the Université de Bruxelles.

== Club career ==
Moreau de Melen began his football career at FC Liégeois in 1895, aged 16, and despite his tender age, he helped his side win the inaugural Belgian championship in 1895–96. He played a crucial role in the Liégeois side that won back-to-back league titles in 1897–98 and 1898–99, starting in both legs of the 1899 championship final against FC Brugeois, in which he kept a clean-sheet in the first leg in an eventual 6–3 aggregate victory. During this period, Liégeois had an unbeaten run of 23 official matches that lasted over two years, between 28 February 1897 and 12 November 1899, coming to an end in a 3–5 loss to Antwerp FC.

He stayed loyal to the club for over a decade until 1907, when he retired at the age of 28.

== International career ==
At the 1900 Summer Olympics, Moreau de Melen was one of two Liégeois players, the other being Lucien Londot, who represented the Belgium Olympic team, featuring in the team's only games at the tournament against Club Français.

On 3 January 1904, Moreau de Melen was the only Liégeois player who played for Belgium in a 6–4 win over the Netherlands in the Coupe Vanden Abeele, an unofficial friendly cup.

On 7 May 1905, the 26-year-old Moreau de Melen earned his first and last international cap for the official Belgium side, making his debut as captain in a friendly match against France at Uccle, which ended in a record-breaking 7–0 victory, and this winning margin remained unmatched for seven years until Belgium's 9–2 win over Switzerland in 1912.

== Honours ==
=== Club ===
FC Liégeois

- Belgian Championship:
  - Champions (3): 1896, 1898, and 1899

=== International ===
Belgium Olympic

- Summer Olympics:
  - Bronze medal (1): 1900
