= Albert Friling =

Belgian footballer (1879–1946)

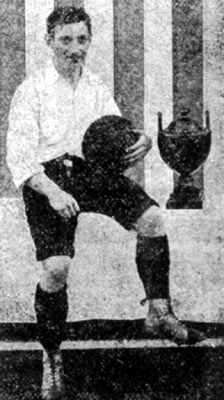
- Albert Friling

Personal information
- Date of birth: 25 February 1879
- Place of birth: Liège, Belgium
- Date of death: 1 May 1946 (aged 67)
- Place of death: London, England
- Position: Defender

Senior career*
Years	Team	Apps	(Gls)
1895–1900	Antwerp FC		
1900–1912	Beerschot AC		

International career
1901–1904	Belgium XI (unofficial)	4	(0)
1904–1909	Belgium	2	(0)
- * Club domestic league appearances and goals

Albert Friling (25 February 1879 – 1 May 1946) was a Belgian footballer who played for Antwerp FC and Beerschot AC. He also played in two matches for the Belgium national team in 1904 and 1909.

== Club career ==
Friling began his football career as a defender in the young ranks of Antwerp FC in 1890, aged 11. He made his senior debut five years later, on 17 November 1895, in a 2–3 loss to Léopold FC. He stayed loyal to the club for another five years until 1900, playing a total of 22 competitive matches, but failing to score a single goal.

In the 1899–1900 Belgian First Division, Antwerp narrowly missed out on reaching the national final after losing a tie-breaker playoff to Racing de Bruxelles 0–1. Following this, the majority of the players and the Friling brothers left the club to join the newly founded Beerschot AC, and whilst his brother Fernand was named Deputy Secretary of the football team, Albert received no particular appointment, and played in the club's first-ever match on 6 May 1900, a friendly game against the Antwerp Reserves. In the build-up for a charity match against Racing de Bruxelles on 14 October, the people of Brussels were impressed that the grass field was carefully leveled through a large stick pulled by a donkey, so after the match, they asked for such a donkey to level their own terrain, and as a sign of eternal friendship, Friling promised that the donkey's first child would be given to Racing, but such never happened because Friling had to conclude that the donkey was not a female, but a male.

Friling started in the club's first official match on 21 October 1900, which ended in a 10–2 victory over FC Brugeois, and in his first season at the club, Beerschot became vice-champions of Belgium, falling just one point short of the winners Racing. Their runner-up finish allowed them to compete in the 1901 edition of the Challenge International du Nord in Tourcoing, where Potts helped his club win its first-ever piece of silverware after beating Léopold Club de Bruxelles 2–0 in the final on 12 May.

He stayed loyal to the club for over a decade until 1912, when he retired at the age of 33.

== International career ==
In 1901–04, Friling played for Belgium in all four unofficial matches of the Coupe Vanden Abeele, a friendly cup duel between the Low Countries. He was one of four Beerschot players to feature in the inaugural edition in 1901, the others being the Potts brothers (Herbert and Walter) and Jan Robyns, in which he captained his side to an 8–0 victory over a third-rate Dutch team. He also captained Belgium in the second and third matches, which ended in 1–0 and 2–1 wins, respectively.

On 1 May 1904, Friling was one of the eleven footballers who played in Belgium's first-ever official match, which was another friendly cup, the Évence Coppée Trophy, this time against France, ending in a 3–3 draw. He had to wait five years to earn his second and final international cap for Belgium, a friendly against England amateurs in London on 17 April 1909, which ended in a 11–2 loss.

== Honours ==
Antwerp

- Belgian First Division vice-champions: 1895–96

Beerschot

- Belgian First Division vice-champions: 1900–01
- Challenge International du Nord champions: 1901
