= Lucien Londot =

Belgian footballer

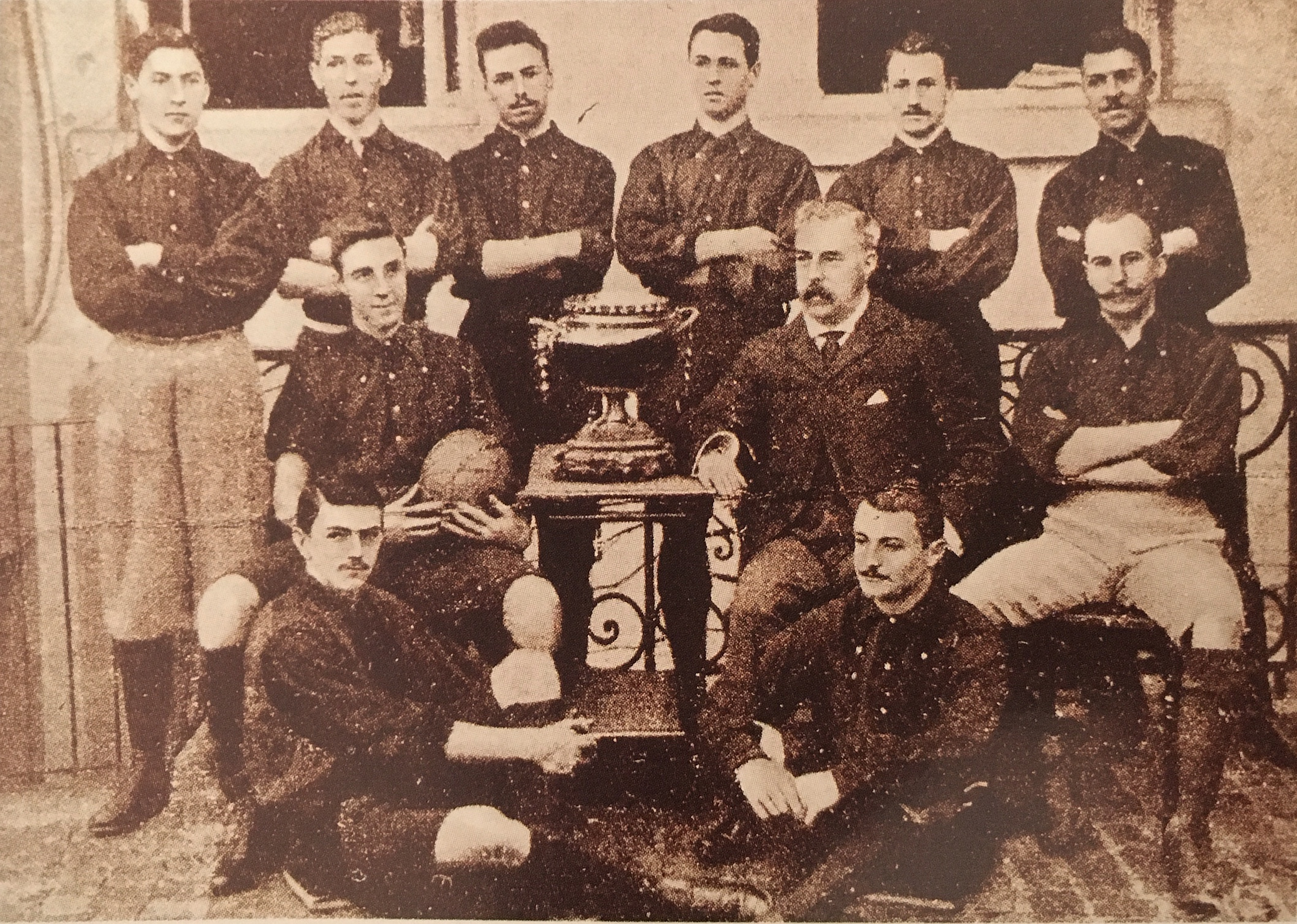
- Londot (sitting on the floor, first from right) in 1896

Personal information
- Full name: Lucien Jean Londot
- Date of birth: 23 April 1874
- Place of birth: Liège, Belgium
- Date of death: Unknown

Senior career*
Years	Team	Apps	(Gls)
1895–1905	FC Liégeois		

International career
1900	Belgium Olympic	1	(0)
1901	Belgium	1	(0)
Medal record
Men's football
Representing Belgium
Olympic Games
Gold medal – first place	1900 Paris	Team
- * Club domestic league appearances and goals

Lucien Jean Londot (23 April 1874 – Unknown) was a Belgian footballer who competed in the 1900 Olympic Games, winning a bronze medal as a member of a mixed team representing Belgium that was mostly made-up of students from the Université de Bruxelles.

== Club career ==
Londot began his football career at FC Liégeois in 1895, helping his side win the inaugural Belgian championship in 1895–96. He played a crucial role in the Liégeois side that won back-to-back league titles in 1897–98 and 1898–99, starting in both legs of the 1899 championship final against FC Brugeois, in which he kept a clean-sheet in the first leg in an eventual 6–3 aggregate victory. During this period, Liégeois had an unbeaten run of 23 official matches that lasted over two years, between 28 February 1897 and 12 November 1899, coming to an end in a 3–5 loss to Antwerp FC.

== International career ==
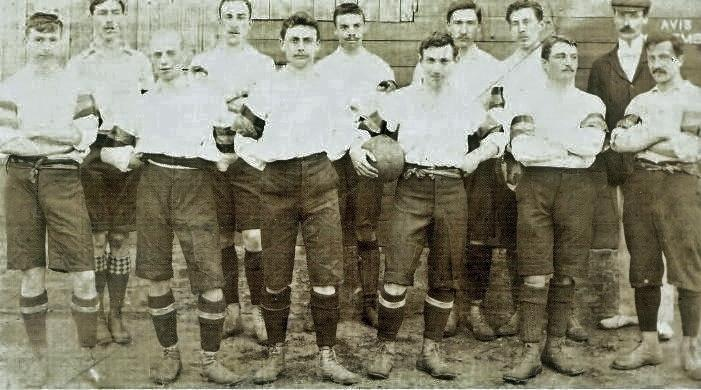
The first-ever Belgium national team in 1901. Londot can be seen in front, the second from the right.

At the 1900 Summer Olympics, Londot was one of two Liégeois players, the other being Ernest Moreau de Melen, who represented the Belgium Olympic team, featuring in the team's only games at the tournament against Club Français.

On 28 April 1901, Londot participated in the very first match of a Belgian national team at the 1901 Coupe Vanden Abeele, keeping a clean sheet in an 8–0 trashing of a third-rate Dutch side. He was one of the three Liégeois players to feature in this match, the others being Fernand Defalle and Harry Menzies; however, this match is not officially recognized by FIFA because of the presence of foreign players in the Belgium side, including Menzies.

== Honours ==
=== Club ===
FC Liégeois

- Belgian Championship:
  - Champions (3): 1896, 1898, and 1899

=== International ===
Belgium Olympic

- Summer Olympics:
  - Bronze medal (1): 1900
