= Gérard Kleinermann =

Belgian footballer (1876–1962)

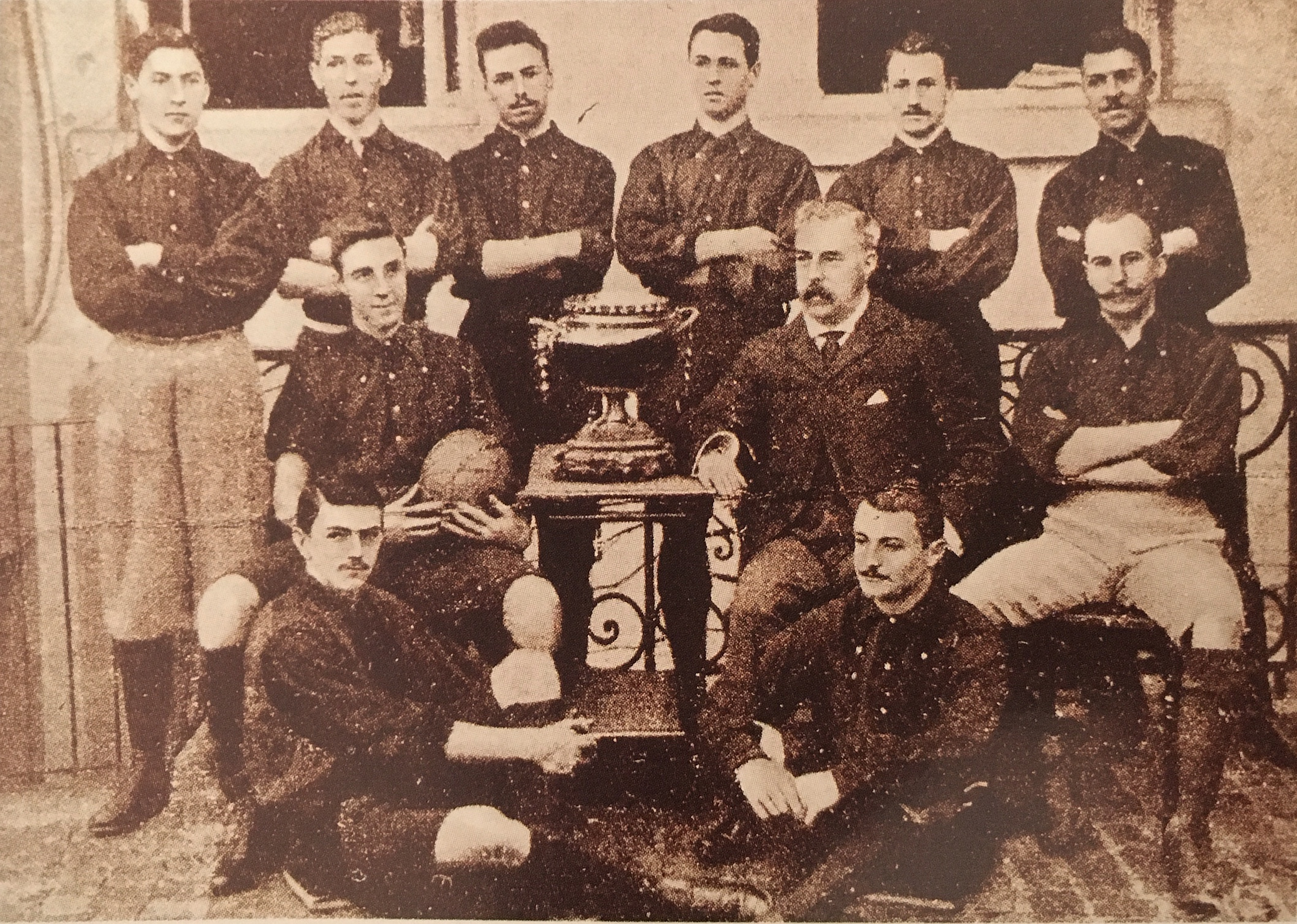
- Kleinermann (standing, first from right) in 1896

Personal information
- Full name: Gérard Lambert Henri Albert Kleinermann
- Date of birth: 15 November 1876
- Place of birth: Liège, Belgium
- Date of death: 13 February 1962 (aged 85)
- Place of death: Liège, Belgium
- Position: Goalkeeper

Senior career*
Years	Team	Apps	(Gls)
1896–1900	FC Liégeois		
- * Club domestic league appearances and goals

Gérard Kleinermann (15 November 1876 – 13 February 1962) was a Belgian footballer who played as a goalkeeper for Belgian clubs FC Liégeois between 1896 and 1900.

== Early and personal life ==
Gérard Kleinermann was born in Liège on 15 November 1876, as the son of Albert Kleinermann (1844–1923), a lawyer, Sophie Florentine Jeanne Marie Billon (1848–1921).

Kleinermann married Jeanne Dallemagne (1882–1969) in Liège on 1 July 1902, and the couple had six children: Jean (1903–1984), Emile (1907–2003), Marguerite (1908–2003), Walther (1913–2006), André, and Denise. In 1904, his wife Jeanne purchased a castle from the Brixhe family, the so-called Château de Florzé, which according to legend was named by Julius Caesar, "Florzeias" meaning sea of flowers.

== Career ==
Kleinermann helped FC Liégeois win back-to-back league titles in 1897–98 and 1898–99, starting in both legs of the 1899 championship final against FC Brugeois, in which he kept a clean-sheet in the first leg of a 6–3 aggregate victory. During this period, Liégeois had an unbeaten run of 23 official matches that lasted over two years, between 28 February 1897 and 12 November 1899, coming to an end in a 5–3 loss to Antwerp FC which Kleinermann did not play.

== Honours ==
FC Liégeois

- Belgian Championship: 1898, 1899
