= Ernest Gillon =

Belgian footballer

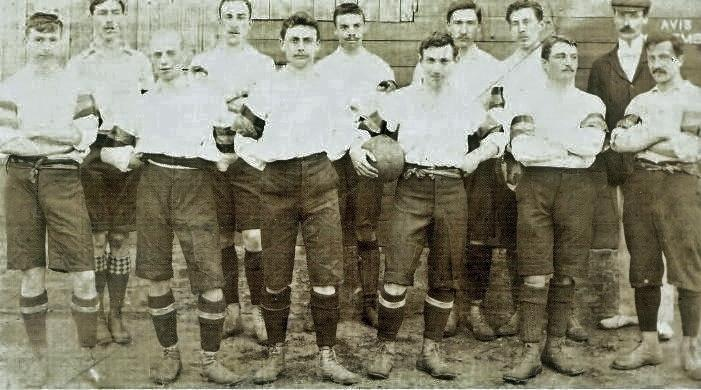
- Gillon (front row, third from left) in 1901

Personal information
- Place of birth: Belgium
- Position: Forward

Senior career*
Years	Team	Apps	(Gls)
1895–1896	Sporting Club de Bruxelles		
1896–1902	Athletic & Running Club Brussels		
1902–1903	Léopold		

International career
1901–1903	Belgium XI (unofficial)	3	(0)
- * Club domestic league appearances and goals

Ernest Gillon was a Belgian footballer who played as a forward for Athletic & Running Club Brussels at the turn of the century.

== Playing career ==
Gillon was a member of the Sporting Club de Bruxelles team that participated in the inaugural Belgian championship in 1895–96.

At the end of the season, he joined Athletic & Running Club Brussels, with whom he participated in the 1899 Challenge international du Nord, helping his side to a resounding 10–1 win over French club Sport audomarois in the quarterfinals, but then being knockedout in the semifinals by Club Brugge. Two years later, he refereed the final of the 1901 Challenge International du Nord between Beerschot and Léopold, which ended in a 2–0 win to the former. In the following year, Gillon and Gustave Pelgrims of Léopold were invented by Beerschot to reinforce their team in the upcoming final of the 1902 Challenge International du Nord, which ended in a 4–2 loss to Antwerp FC. He played with Athletic & Running Club Brussels for six years, from 1896 until 1902, when he went to Léopold, where he retired in 1903.

On 28 April 1901, Gillon was the only Athletic & Running player who participated in the very first match of a Belgian national team at the 1901 Coupe Vanden Abeele, helping his side to a 8–0 trashing of a third-rate Dutch side. He also featured in the next two Coupe Vanden Abeele matches, which also ended in victories to Belgium.

== Later life ==
In early 1904, Gillon was among the founders of Société d’Encouragement Football Association (SEFA), an external body independent of the USFSA, the then sports governing body in France. A few months later, on 16 April, the SEFA assembled a France national team to face Corinthians, which was welcomed to Paris by a reception committee that was made up of the most notable figures in French football at the time, including Gillon, Jack Wood, Ernest Weber, William Sleator, Walter Hewson, Philip Tomalin, Alfred Tunmer, Georges Duhamel, and the Paris Committee of the USFSA.
