= Jean-Marc Bosman =

Belgian footballer (born 1964)

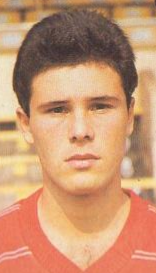
- Bosman with RFC Liège

Personal information
- Date of birth: 30 October 1964 (age 61)
- Place of birth: Liège, Belgium
- Position: Midfielder

Youth career
- –1983: Standard Liège

Senior career*
Years	Team	Apps	(Gls)
1982–1988	Standard Liège	86	(3)
1988–1990	RFC Liège	25	(1)
1990–1991	Saint-Quentin	12	(1)
1992	Saint-Denis	15	(4)
1993–1995	Olympic Charleroi	27	(2)
1995–1996	C.S. Visé	7	(1)
Total		174	(12)

International career
1984–1986	Belgium U21	24	(0)
- * Club domestic league appearances and goals

Jean-Marc Bosman (French: [ʒɑ̃ maʁk bɔsman]; born 30 October 1964) is a Belgian former professional footballer who played as a midfielder. His judicial challenge of the football transfer rules led to the Bosman ruling in 1995.

This landmark judgement, which was handed down by the European Court of Justice, completely changed the way footballers are employed, allowing professional players in the European Union to move freely to another club at the end of their contract with their present team.

== Club career ==
=== Standard Liège ===
Bosman joined the youth team at Belgian First Division club Standard Liège and he was included in the senior squad for the first time during the 1982 Intertoto Cup, debuting for the club on 7 October 1982 during the 3–1 victory against First Professional Football League (Bulgaria) club Cherno More. Ahead of the 1983–84 season, Bosman was fully integrated into the Standard Liège senior team in the Belgian First Division. He made his league debut for the club on 7 April 1984 during the 2–0 loss against K.S.K. Beveren, and finished as a runner-up in the 1983–84 Belgian Cup, being an unused substitute in the final. He was also an Intertoto Cup group winner in 1984.

He scored his first goal for Standard Liège on 19 May 1985 during the 2–2 draw against KSV Waregem as the club finished in third place during the 1985–86 season. He finished as a runner-up in the Belgian Cup again with Standard Liège in 1987–88, appearing only in the second leg of the semi-finals against Lierse.

=== RFC Liège ===
In August 1988, Bosman joined fellow Belgian First Division club RFC Liège on a two-year contract worth around £66,000. He debuted for RFC Liège as a second-half substitute during the 3–0 victory against Royal Charleroi on 13 August 1988, and he scored his only goal for the club on 8 April 1989 during the 4–0 victory against Cercle Brugge.

In his first season at the club, they finished in third place in the Belgian First Division. He then won the 1989–90 Belgian Cup with RFC Liège.

=== Saint-Quentin ===
After a failed move to Dunkerque in 1990, Bosman joined French Division 2 club Saint-Quentin. He scored on his debut during the 2–1 victory against US Orléans on 24 December 1990. He had left Saint-Quentin in late March 1991, shortly after they went into liquidation.

=== Later career ===
In January 1992 he joined Réunion Premier League club Saint-Denis where he scored four goals in fifteen matches for the club; he left in August 1992.

He joined Belgian Third Division club Olympic Charleroi in 1994 and scored twice for the club. In late December 1995 he left to join Belgian Fourth Division club C.S. Visé where he retired in August 1996 after scoring once in seven matches for the club.

== International career ==
Bosman made twenty-four appearances for Belgium U21 between 1984 and 1986; (Note: Often incorrectly listed as twenty caps.) he was the team captain of Belgium U21 by 1986. He played for Belgium U21 during the 1984 UEFA European Under-21 Championship qualifying.

== Trial ==
When his contract with RFC Liège had expired, he attempted to join French club Dunkerque in 1990, at the age of 25; however, RFC Liège valued him at a fee of approximately £500,000, and insisted that the French club pay in full up front. When they refused, Liège refused to agree to the transfer, and cut Bosman's wages by 75% to £500 per month This led Bosman to challenge the system legally and bring his case to court; he sued RFC Liège, the Belgian FA, and UEFA, arguing that the rules set out by UEFA, which prevented him from leaving his club even though his contract had expired, amounted to a breach of his rights established in the 1957 Treaty of Rome, which allowed freedom of movement within the European Community, now the European Union; as a result, his club suspended him.

On 15 December 1995, the European Court of Justice ruled that players should be free to move when their contracts had expired, and that EU clubs could hire any number of European Union players.

== After the ruling ==
Despite the legal victory, Bosman faced significant financial and personal difficulties following the landmark trial. In a 2011 interview, he claimed that the compensation he earned from FIFPro and the courts were largely spent on legal fees, which ultimately left him bankrupt; furthermore, his marriage also ended during his legal battles and trial. Some of his money was also lost due to a bad investment in a special T-shirt line. Bosman hoped that the players who benefited from the Bosman ruling would support him by buying one of his "Who's the Boz" T-shirts. He sold only one, to the son of his lawyer. He also hoped to play a testimonial match, which eventually fell through, however, although he ultimately played a match against Lille in front of only approximately 2,000 spectators. In order to pay his taxes, he was forced to sell his second house and his Porsche Carrera. He struggled to find work after the ruling, and ended up living on welfare. As a result of his financial difficulties and his claimed ostracism by the world of football, Bosman fell into depression and also struggled with alcoholism.

In April 2013 Bosman was given a one-year suspended prison sentence, later reduced to community service on appeal, following an assault in 2011 on both his girlfriend at the time and her 15-year-old daughter allegedly over his girlfriend's refusal to give him an alcoholic drink.

As of 2015, Bosman was unemployed and relying on handouts from FIFPro.

In 2020, Bosman was interviewed by David Ginola for the BT Sport documentary Bosman: The Player Who Changed Football.

== Personal life ==
Bosman has two sons.

== Career statistics ==
Appearances and goals by club, season and competition
Club	Season	League			National cup (Note: Includes Belgian Cup and Coupe de France)		Europe		Other		Total	
Club	Season	Division	Apps	Goals	Apps	Goals	Apps	Goals	Apps	Goals	Apps	Goals
Standard Liège	1982–83	Belgian First Division	0	0	0	0	2 (Note: Two appearances in Intertoto Cup)	0	—		2	0
Standard Liège	1983–84	Belgian First Division	6	0	0	0	2	0	—		8	0
Standard Liège	1984–85	Belgian First Division	19	1	2	0	5 (Note: Two appearances in Intertoto Cup and three appearances in UEFA Cup)	0	—		26	1
Standard Liège	1985–86	Belgian First Division	17	1	—		—		3 (Note: Three appearances in Belgian League Cup)	0	20	1
Standard Liège	1986–87	Belgian First Division	26	1	4	0	7 (Note: Five appearances in Intertoto Cup and two appearances in UEFA Cup)	0	—		37	1
Standard Liège	1987–88	Belgian First Division	4	0	1	0	—		—		5	0
RFC Liège	1988–89	Belgian First Division	8	1	4	0	0	0	—		12	1
RFC Liège	1989–90	Belgian First Division	17	0	2	0	10 (Note: Six appearances in Intertoto Cup and four appearances in UEFA Cup)	0	—		29	0
RFC Liège	Total		111	4	13	0	26	0	3	0	149	4
Saint-Quentin	1990–91	French Division 2	12	1	1	0	—		—		13	1
Saint-Denis	1992	Réunion Premier League	15	4	0	0	—		—		15	4
Olympic Charleroi	1993–94	Belgian Third Division	27	2	0	0	—		1 (Note: One appearance in Belgian League Cup)	0	28	2
Olympic Charleroi	1994–95	Belgian Third Division	0	0	0	0	—		—		0	0
C.S. Visé	1995–96	Belgian Fourth Division	7	1	0	0	—		—		7	1
C.S. Visé	Total		59	8	1	0	—		1	0	63	8
Career total			170	11	14	0	26	0	4	0	212	12

== Honours ==
Standard Liège

- Belgian First Division: third place 1985–86
- Belgian Cup: runner-up 1983–84, 1987–88
- Intertoto Cup: group winner 1984

RFC Liège

- Belgian First Division: third place 1988–89
- Belgian Cup: 1989–90
