= 1895–96 in Belgian football =

Belgian football
- Season: 1895-96
- Champions: F.C. Liégeois
- Relegated: Not participating next season
- Matches: 72

== Overview ==
Only one official league existed at the time. It was called Coupe de Championnat (Championship Cup) and was disputed between 7 teams.

== Honour ==
Competition	Winner
Championship Cup	F.C. Liégeois

== League standings ==
Pos	Team	Pld	Won	Drw	Lst	GF	GA	GD	Pts	Notes
1	F.C. Liégeois	12	9	2	1	32	11	+21	20	
2	Antwerp F.C.	12	7	0	5	33	13	+20	14	
3	Sporting Club de Bruxelles	12	6	1	5	31	30	+1	13	
4	Léopold Club de Bruxelles	12	6	0	6	31	29	+2	12	
5	Racing Club de Bruxelles	12	6	0	6	32	31	+1	12	
6	F.C. Brugeois	12	5	1	6	22	21	+1	11	Not participating next season.
7	Union F.C. d'Ixelles	12	1	0	11	5	51	-46	2	Not participating next season.
