= Samuel Hickson (footballer) =

English footballer

Senior career*
Years	Team	Apps	(Gls)
1895–1903	Liège		
- * Club domestic league appearances and goals

Samuel Hickson was an English footballer who played as a forward for Belgian club Liège between 1895 and 1903. He was topscorer in the Belgian First Division in the 1895–96 and 1896–97 seasons.

== Honours ==
=== Club ===
Football Club Liégeois

- Belgian First Division champions: 1895-96, 1896–97, 1898-99

=== Individual ===
- Belgian First Division top scorer: 1895-96, 1896–97
