= Henry Menzies =

Henry Menzies may refer to:

- Henry Menzies (rugby union)
- Henry Menzies (cricketer)
