= 1900–01 in Belgian football =

Football in Belgium
- Season: 1900–01

The 1900–01 season was the sixth competitive season in Belgian football.

== Overview ==
Only one official league existed at the time. It was called Coupe de Championnat (Championship Cup) and was disputed between 9 teams.

No team was relegated this season since the FA decided to split the division into two leagues again. Two new teams were admitted at the end of the season: Antwerp F.C. and Union Saint-Gilloise.

== Honour ==
Competition	Winner
Championship Cup	Racing Club de Bruxelles

== Final table ==
Pos	Team	Pld	Won	Drw	Lst	GF	GA	Pts	GD	Notes
1	Racing Club de Bruxelles	16	10	6	0	44	11	26	+33	
2	Beerschot A.C.	16	11	3	2	47	21	25	+26	
3	Léopold Club de Bruxelles	16	10	3	3	37	20	23	+17	
4	Athletic and Running Club de Bruxelles	16	7	4	5	39	26	18	+13	
5	Skill F.C. de Bruxelles	16	5	3	8	36	30	13	+6	
6	F.C. Liégeois	16	5	3	8	21	29	13	-8	
7	Verviers F.C.	16	6	0	10	19	43	12	-24	
8	F.C. Brugeois	16	2	4	10	10	45	8	-35	
9	C.S. Brugeois	16	1	4	11	16	44	6	-28	
