= Walter Potts =

Walter Potts may refer to:

- Walter Potts (footballer) (1876–?), English footballer
- Walter Potts (character), a Coronation Street character
