= Gunther Hofmans =

Belgian footballer

Personal information
- Full name: Gunther Jozef Hofmans
- Date of birth: 3 January 1967 (age 59)
- Place of birth: Berchem, Belgium
- Height: 1.80 m (5 ft 11 in)
- Positions: Attacking midfielder; striker

Youth career
- 1975–1984: KFC Ranst
- 1984–1985: Racing Mechelen
- 1985–1986: FC Nijlen

Senior career*
Years	Team	Apps	(Gls)
1986–1999	Germinal Ekeren	333	(157)
1999–2000	Germinal Beerschot	33	(10)
Total		366	(167)

International career
1992	Belgium	1	(0)
- * Club domestic league appearances and goals

Gunther Jozef Hofmans (born 3 January 1967) is a former Belgian professional footballer who spent his entire career in Belgium playing as an attacking midfielder and striker for Germinal Ekeren and Germinal Beerschot. He also represented the Belgium national team, winning one cap. He currently works as a team manager for Royal Antwerp, since 2011, having previously worked in the same position, at one of his previous clubs, Germinal Beerschot, from 2008 to 2011.

== Club career ==
Hofmans started his career at youth club KFC Ranst, where he played from 1975 to 1984. He then joined Racing Mechelen in 1984, before moving to FC Nijlen the following year.

Hofmans began playing on senior level in 1986, after completing a move to Germinal Ekeren, who were playing in the Belgian Third Division. In the 1987–88 season, he scored 17 goals for Ekeren as they were promoted to the second division following a second place behind Stade Leuven.

In the 1988–89 season, Hofmans made a total of 30 league appearances, scoring thirteen times for the Antwerp team, under Albert Bers as manager, as they were crowned winners that season, thus achieving promotion to the highest division. Hofmans helped Germinal Ekeren reach the final of the 1989–90 Belgian Cup, where he scored the equalising goal as they suffered a 1–2 defeat to RFC Liège. Ekeren reached the final of the cup again in the following season, where they won 4–2 against Anderlecht, with Hofmans netting the fourth goal.

Following Ekeren's participation in the 1997–98 UEFA Cup Winners' Cup, Hofmans scored his only goal on 18 September 1997, as they won 3–2 against Red Star Belgrade in the first leg of the commencing round, before they were eliminated 4–6 on aggregate in the next round by VfB Stuttgart.

Hofmans transferred Germinal Beerschot in 1999, playing there for a season before retiring in 2000.

== International career ==
Hofmans appeared only once for Belgium, making his debut on 22 April 1992, following his inclusion in the squad by Paul Van Himst, where he came on as a substitute for Marc Wilmots, who scored the winning goal in a 1–0 victory in their 1994 World Cup qualifier game against Cyprus.

== Later career ==
Hofmans was appointed as team manager of Germinal Beerschot in 2008. He spent three years there, before being unveiled as the new team manager of Royal Antwerp in 2011, succeeding Patrick Vanoppen.

== Honours ==
Germinal Ekeren

- Belgian Second Division: 1988–89
- Belgian Cup: 1996–97
