= Alfons De Winter =

Belgian footballer

Alphonse François Marie de Winter
Personal information
- Date of birth: 12 September 1908
- Place of birth: Antwerp, Belgium
- Date of death: 7 July 1997 (aged 88)
- Height: 1.80 m (5 ft 11 in)
- Position: Midfielder

Senior career*
Years	Team	Apps	(Gls)
1928–1939	Beerschot		

International career
1935–1938	Belgium	19	(0)
- * Club domestic league appearances and goals

Alphonse Fons François Marie de Winter was a Belgian footballer, born 12 September 1908 in Antwerp, died 7 July 1997.

He was a midfielder for Beerschot VAC. He twice won the Belgian First Division in 1938 and 1939.

He played 19 matches for Belgium, including the last 16 of the 1938 World Cup, against France, at Stade de Colombes (lost, 3-1).

== Honours ==
- International from 1935 to 1938 (19 caps)
- Participation in the 1938 World Cup (played 1 match)
- Belgian Champions in 1938 and 1939 with Beerschot VAC
- Vice-Champions of Belgium in 1937 with Beerschot VAC
