= Tarik Kharif =

French footballer (born 1976)

Personal information
- Date of birth: September 16, 1976 (age 50)
- Place of birth: Épinal, France
- Position: Midfielder

Senior career*
Years	Team	Apps	(Gls)
–1998	FC Metz	1	(0)
1998–1999	SM Caen	13	(1)
1999–2001	KAA Gent	36	(6)
2001–2002	RFC Liège		
2002–2003	RAEC Mons	11	(0)
2003–2004	RFC Liège		
2007–2011	CS Fola Esch		
2011–2012	Union Remich-Bous		
- * Club domestic league appearances and goals

Tarik Kharif (born 16 September 1976) is a French former footballer.

== Early life ==
Kharif was born in 1976 in France. He is of Moroccan descent.

== Career ==
Kharif started his career with French Ligue 1 side FC Metz. In 1998, he signed for French side SM Caen. In 1999, he signed for Belgian side KAA Gent. In 2001, he signed for Belgian side RFC Liège. He was regarded to have initially struggled before being described as "fully lived up to expectations". In 2002, he signed for Belgian side RAEC Mons. In 2003, he returned to Belgian side RFC Liège. In 2007, he signed for Luxembourgian side CS Fola Esch. In 2011, he signed for Luxembourgian side Union Remich-Bous.

== Style of play ==
Kharif mainly operated as a midfielder. He was described as "seduced supporters with his generosity on the right flank".

== Personal life ==
Kharif is a native of Epinal, France. He has three children.
