= Camille Van Hoorden =

Belgian footballer and coach

Personal information
- Full name: Camille Vanhoorden
- Date of birth: 15 February 1879
- Place of birth: Belgium
- Date of death: 31 July 1919 (aged 40)
- Position: Midfielder

Senior career*
Years	Team	Apps	(Gls)
1895–1896	Sporting Club de Bruxelles	1	(0)
1895–1896	Union F.C. d'Ixelles	2	(0)
1896–1914	Racing Club de Bruxelles	201	(16)

International career
1904–1912	Belgium	24	(4)
- * Club domestic league appearances and goals

Camille Van Hoorden (15 February 1879 – 31 July 1919) was a Belgian footballer and coach. He was part of the Belgian team (Université de Bruxelles), which won the bronze medal at the exhibition tournament at the Olympic Games in Paris in 1900, listed in the Official Report as C. Van Hoorden.

He won 24 caps for the Belgian team between 1904 and 1912. He was captain 11 times, and took part in the Belgium–France game of 1904, the first official game played by the two national teams.

At club level, he played for Sporting Club de Bruxelles and Union F.C. d'Ixelles in the 1895–96 season and for Racing Club de Bruxelles between 1896 and 1914. He scored 16 goals from 204 matches.

== Honours ==
=== Racing Club Bruxelles ===
- Belgian First Division: 1907-08
- Belgian Cup: 1912

=== National team ===
- Olympic Games: 1900 (bronze)

=== Individual ===
- Former Belgium's Most Capped Player: 1912-1928 (24 caps)
