= Gustave Pelgrims =

Belgian footballer

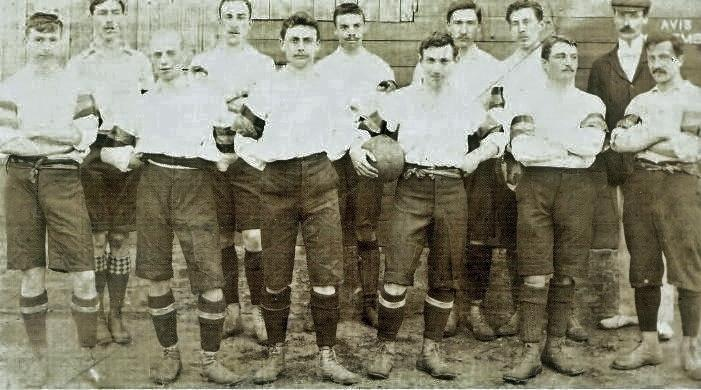
- Pelgrims (second from the right) in 1901

Personal information
- Full name: Gustave Émile Eugène Pelgrims
- Date of birth: 14 June 1878
- Place of birth: Schaerbeek, Belgium
- Date of death: 4 September 1960 (aged 82)
- Place of death: Uccle, Belgium
- Position: Midfielder

Senior career*
Years	Team	Apps	(Gls)
1895–1896	Léopold FC		
1896–1903	Racing Club de Bruxelles		
1903–1904	Léopold FC		
1904–1909	Racing Club de Bruxelles		

International career
1900	Belgium Olympic	1	(0)
1901	Belgium XI (unofficial)	1	(0)
Medal record
Men's football
Representing Belgium
Bronze medal – third place	1900 Paris	Team competition
- * Club domestic league appearances and goals

Gustave Émile Eugène Pelgrims (14 June 1878 – 4 September 1960) was a Belgian footballer who competed in the 1900 Olympic Games. In Paris he won a bronze medal as a member of a mixed team representing Belgium that was mostly made up of students from the Université de Bruxelles.

== Early and personal life ==
Gustave Pelgrims was born in Schaerbeek on 14 June 1878, as the son of Gustave Pelgrims (1841–1888) and Clémence Dailly (1855–1925). He was the second of three children.

Pelgrims married Angèle Vanbuylaere on 22 October 1906, but they had no children.

== Club career ==
Pelgrims began his football career at Léopold FC in 1895, at the age of 17, leaving the club at the end of the season to join Racing Club de Bruxelles, with whom he won four consecutive Belgian championships between 1900 and 1903. He then returned to Léopold FC in July 1903 until June 1904, before rejoining the Racing Club of Brussels from 1904 to 1909.

On 25 May 1902, Pelgrims joined Beerschot AC for one match because the club was short on the squad for the final of the 1902 Challenge International du Nord, which took place in Tourcoing, France. He lost the match that he played 2–4 to rivals Antwerp FC.

== International career ==
Pelgrims represented the Belgium Olympic at the 1900 Summer Olympics, featuring in the team's only game at the tournament against Club Français, which ended in a 2–6 loss.

In the following year, on 28 April 1901, Pelgrims played in the first-ever match of a Belgium national team at the 1901 Coupe Vanden Abeele, which ended in an 8–0 trashing of a third-rate Dutch side.

== Death ==
Pelgrims died in Uccle on 4 September 1960, at the age of 72.

== Honours ==
=== Club ===
Racing Club de Bruxelles

- Belgian Championship:
  - Champions (4): 1900, 1901, 1902, and 1903

=== International ===
Belgium Olympic

- Summer Olympics:
  - Bronze medal (1): 1900
