= K Beerschot VAC =

Belgian football club

- Full name: Koninklijke Beerschot Voetbal en Atletiek Club
- Founded: 1899; 127 years ago
- Dissolved: 1999; 27 years ago
- Ground: Olympisch Stadion (Antwerp)

Koninklijke Beerschot Voetbal en Atletiek Club was a Belgian football club from Antwerp, founded in 1899 when most players of Antwerp FC left that club. It played in the 1920 Olympic Games stadium named the "Kiel". Winners of seven Belgian league titles between 1922 and 1939 and two Belgian Cups in the 1970s, the club's 100-year history ended with dissolution in 1999. Since then, its legacy has been continued via rebranding of other local clubs: Beerschot AC (from KFC Germinal Ekeren, also now defunct) and the extant K Beerschot VA (from KFCO Wilrijk).

== History ==
=== Origins ===
In 1895, Ernest Grisar acquired a racecourse with its buildings and annexes near the "Beerschothof" park in Kiel, in the south of Antwerp, which consisted of a 19-hectare plot of land with stables, changing rooms, chalet, and a grandstand. Four years later, his son Alfred, seeing the place and its facilities, suggested the idea of creating a multi-sports club where they could practice field hockey, polo, cricket, rugby, tennis, athletics and, of course, football. Following Ernest's approval, Alfred founded the Beerschot Athletic Club in the colors of purple and white on 3 September 1899, doing so with the help of his friends Max Elsen, Edouard Lysen, Charles Hunter, and Paul Müller. Ernest died a few weeks later in November, so his son then became the owner of the facilities and the club that he had named Beerschot, in reference to a nearby wooded park called "Beerschotshof".

The young Grisar sought advice for his start in management and surrounded himself with friends to help him, giving each of them a sports section to manage, but choosing his favorite sport for himself, football, whose section was started in February 1900, and then officially registered in July of that year.

=== Early history ===
Grisar then contacted players from Antwerp FC and offered them the chance to join his new club. On 8 April 1900, Antwerp lost 0–1 to Racing de Bruxelles in a play-off to decide who qualified for the National Final. Following this defeat, the majority of the Antwerp players left the club and joined the newly founded Beerschot AC under the chairmanship of Max Elsen and later in the season Paul Havenith. There were so many that Antwerp was unable to continue in the highest division and withdrew temporarily from the league; this episode was the catalyst for the rivalry between the two sides. Among the players who moved were the Potts brothers (Herbert and Walter), the Robyns brothers (Jan and Paul), Albert Friling, and goalkeeper Jules de Surgeloose, who thus became Beerschot's fourth goalkeeper after Charles Withof, Philip Wolff, and Alfred Grisar himself. Herbert Potts and Jan Robyns were named captain and vice-captain of the football team, who played their first match on 6 May 1900, in a friendly game against the Antwerp Reserves. On 15 May, Beerschot officially became a member of the Belgian FA, which allowed them to participate in the 1900–01 Belgian First Division, making their official debut on 21 October 1900, which ended in a 10–2 victory over FC Brugeois; according to reports, there were more women than men at Beerschot's first home match.

Under Havenith's leadership, on 22 February 1901, Beerschot AC was transformed into a public limited company with a fully paid-up capital of 16,000 francs (640 shares of 25 francs). The old square of the former horse racing track was partially transformed into a football field, and later a second football field was added that could also be used for hockey; these two fields were quickly proclaimed as the best fields in Belgium. The club's Secretary General was Frédéric Vanden Abeele and the treasurer was Albert Grisar's brother Louis, while the captain of the cricket team was Charles Maggee, who also worked as a football referee.

In its first season in 1900–01, Beerschot became vice-champions of Belgium, falling just one point short of the winners Racing. The club qualified for the final round of the championship in the following two seasons, finishing third in 1903, and then began to fall back in the table. Their runner-up finish in 1901 allowed them to compete in the 1901 edition of the Challenge International du Nord in Tourcoing, where the club won its first-ever piece of silverware after beating Standard Athletic Club 4–3 in the semifinals, and then Léopold Club de Bruxelles 2–0 in the final on 12 May.

In early 1901, Beerschot AC was the driving force behind what is now considered the first-ever (unofficial) match between the national teams of Belgium and the Netherlands, which was held in the club's field on 28 April. The two sides contested the so-called Coupe Vanden Abeele, which was offered by Beerschot's secretary Frédéric Vanden Abeele, and the game was refereed by Charles Maggee. The Belgium XI, which fielded four Beerschot players, won by a score 8–0, with all of the goals being netted by the Potts brothers.

In the 1905–06 season, the Belgian FA decreed that at the end of the competition, the last-placed club would be relegated and Beerschot AC had the sad honour of being the first officially relegated. The following season (1906–07), the club became the first "elevator club", in the sense of going down one season and up on the next.

Following the Olympic Games in Stockholm, the Beerschot stadium was renovated to meet Olympic requirements to host the 1920 edition in Antwerp, with Alfred Grisar and Beerschot chairman Paul Havenith being part of the committee that worked to bring the Olympic Games to Antwerp.

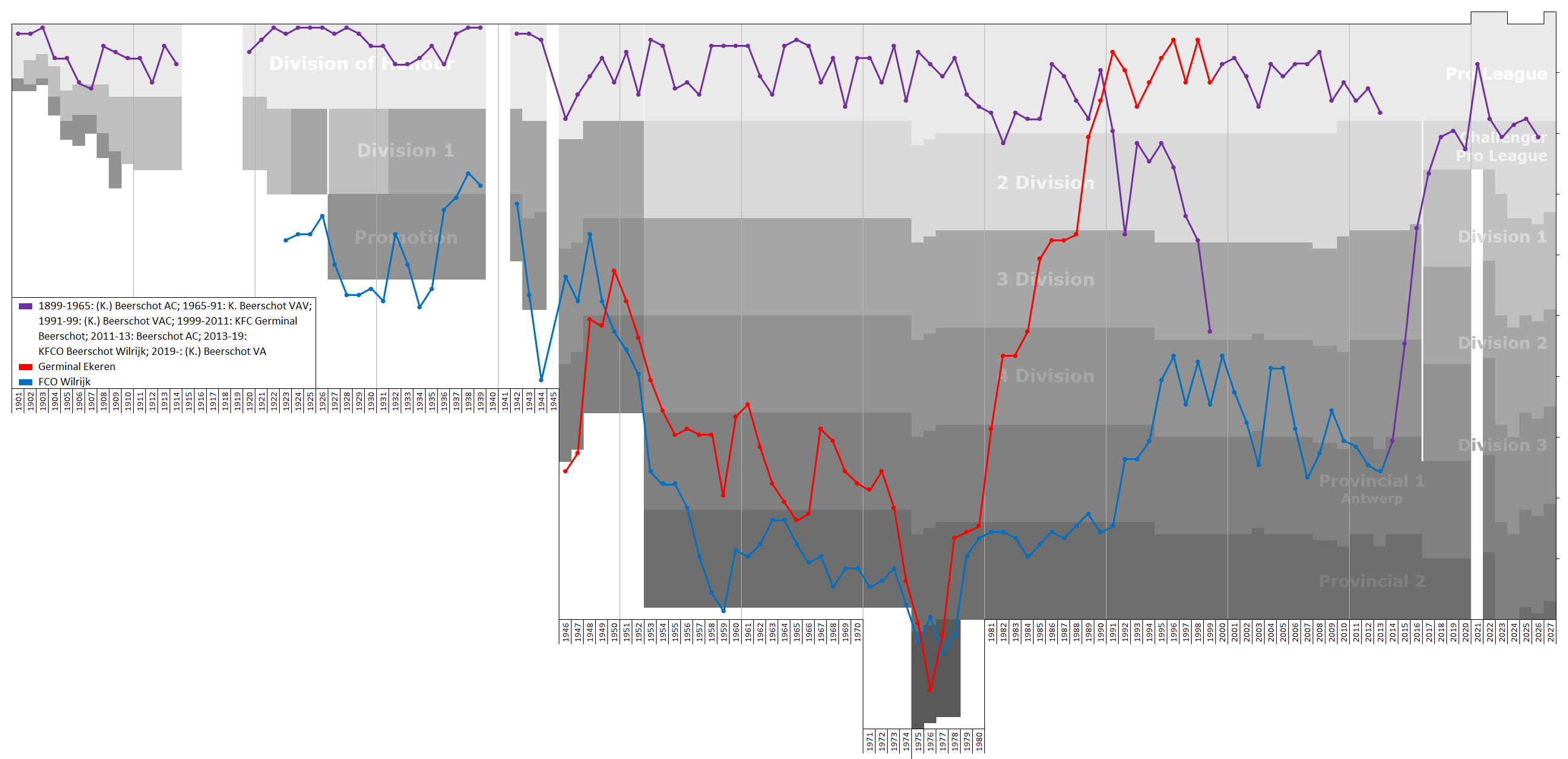
Historical chart of Beerschot VAC and its successors' league performance

=== The Golden Age ===
Having returned to the Highest Division in 1907, Beerschot did not leave it again until the end of the 1980–81 season for a total of 73 years and 66 consecutive seasons in the highest Belgian division.

Until the 1920s, the club remained in the soft underbelly of the rankings, always between 4th and 7th place out of 14 teams. The 1920s and 1930s saw the peak of Antwerp football, with Beerschot (7), Antwerp (2), and Lierse (1) winning a total of 10 titles and numerous top-three finishes (only Royale Union Saint-Gilloise managed to hinder this hegemony). Having become a "Royal Society" in 1925, the club took the name K. Beerschot AC and became champion again in 1928, and then won the two championships before the Second World War. In between, the club had to do without its star player Raymond Braine. He was suspended by the federation for "acts of professionalism". The player went into exile with Slavia Prague in Czechoslovakia. After this, Beerschot never again topped the national laurels. In the 1950s, however, it counted among its ranks the first golden shoe of Belgian football: Rik Coppens.

In 1968, like many other Flemish circles, Beerschot opted for the Dutch-speaking form of its name and became the Koninklijke Beerschot Voetbal en Atletiek Vereniging (or K. Beerschot VAV).

=== Recent years and new name ===
In 1987, the Belgian tax authorities, claiming back taxes, blocked the 40 million francs from the transfer of Patrick Vervoort to Anderlecht. Three years later, Beerschot underwent a tax adjustment after an audit revealed enormities (forgery, tax fraud, failure to declare VAT). Last and relegated in 1990-91, Beerschot was sent back to Division 3 due to its financial situation.

After many financial problems over the years, the club was forced to retire from competition and was dissolved in 1999, thus disappearing after 99 years and 9 months of existence. Shortly after, K.F.C. Germinal Ekeren moved from Ekeren in the north of Antwerp to the south in order to install at the "Kiel". The club changed its name and became Germinal Beerschot, before the name was changed again in 2011 to Beerschot AC. In 2013, Beerschot AC went bankrupt and dissolved. A new team emerged: K Beerschot VA.

== Naming history ==
- 1900: Beerschot Athletic Club (Beerschot AC)
- 1925: Royal Beerschot Athletic Club (R. Beerschot AC)
- 1968: Koninklijke Beerschot Voetbal en Atletiek Vereniging (K. Beerschot VAV)
- 1991: Beerschot Voetbal en Atletiek Club (Beerschot VAC)
- 1995: Koninklijke Beerschot Voetbal en Athletiek Club (K. Beerschot VAC)

== Honours ==
- Belgian First Division
  - Champions (7): 1921–22, 1923–24, 1924–25, 1925–26, 1927–28, 1937–38, 1938–39
  - Runners-up (7): 1900–01, 1922–23, 1926–27, 1928–29, 1936–37, 1941–42, 1942–43
- Belgian Second Division
  - Winners: 1906–07
  - Runners-up: 1981–82, 1992–93, 1994–95
- Belgian Second Division final round
  - Winners: 1982
- Belgian Cup
  - Winners: 1970–71, 1978–79
  - Runners-up: 1967–68
- Challenge International du Nord
  - Winners: 1901

== European cup history ==
Season	Competition	Round	Country	Club	Home	Away	Aggregate
1968–69	Inter-Cities Fairs Cup	1	(Netherlands)	DWS	1–1	1–2	2–3
1971–72	UEFA Cup Winners' Cup	1	(Cyprus)	Anorthosis Famagusta	7–0	1–0	8–0
1971–72	UEFA Cup Winners' Cup	2	(East Germany)	BFC Dynamo	1–3	1–3	2–6
1973–74	UEFA Cup	1	(Portugal)	Vitoria Setubal	0–2	0-2	0–4
1979–80	UEFA Cup Winners' Cup	1	(Socialist Federal Republic of Yugoslavia)	NK Rijeka	0–0	1–2	1–2

== Notable players ==
- (Belgium) Herbert Potts
- (Belgium) Pierre Braine
- (Belgium) Raymond Braine
- (Denmark) Kenneth Brylle
- (Belgium) Arthur Ceuleers
- (Belgium) Philippe Clement
- (Belgium) Julien Cools
- (Belgium) Rik Coppens
- (Belgium) Bob Dalving
- (Belgium) Alfons De Winter
- (Germany) Lothar Emmerich
- (Netherlands) Wim Hofkens
- (Belgium) Constant Huysmans
- (Spain) Juan Lozano
- (Finland) Jari Rantanen
- (Haiti) Emmanuel Sanon
- (Belgium) Gérard Sulon
- (Netherlands) Simon Tahamata
- (Belgium) Guy Thys
- (Finland) Arto Tolsa
- (Poland) Jan Tomaszewski
- (Belgium) John Van Alphen
- (Belgium) Jack Van den Eynde
- (Belgium) Stanley Van den Eynde
- (Belgium) Jan Verheyen
- (Belgium) Patrick Vervoort
- (Belgium) Jef Vliers
- (Bulgaria) Andrey Zhelyazkov
