= 1989–90 Belgian Cup =

Tournament details
- Country: Belgium

Final positions
- Champions: FC Liège
- Runners-up: Germinal Ekeren

Tournament statistics
- Top goal scorer: Gunther Hofmans (9)

The 1989–90 Belgian Cup was the 35th season of the main knockout competition in Belgian association football, the Belgian Cup.

== Final rounds ==
The final phase started when all clubs from the top two divisions in Belgian football entered the competition in the round of 64 (18 clubs from first division, 16 clubs from second division and 30 clubs from the qualifications). The first two rounds were played in one leg, while the next 3 rounds (round of 16, quarter-finals and semifinals) were played in two legs. The final game was played at the Heysel Stadium between FC Liège and Germinal Ekeren, FC Liège winning 2–1.

=== Bracket ===
1st Round
Rita Berlaar	1
Leuven	2
Looi Sport	0
Genk	5
Waregem	2
Bornem	0
Eeklo	3
Saint-Gilloise	1
KV Mechelen	3
Heist Sportief	0
Seraing	4
Overpelt Fabriek	0
Lokeren	3
Oostende	3
Lierse	2
KSK Roeselare	1
Tongeren	1
Hamme	0
Antwerp	0
Hoeselt	1
FC Liège	6
Tienen	1
Kortrijk	8
Lauwe	1
Eendracht Zele	1
Wavre	0
Lommel	3
Mol	1
Cercle Brugge	1
Menen	0
Hutoise	1
Anderlecht	3
Ourodenberg-Aarschot	1
Patro Eisden	0
Oostham	1
KRC Mechelen	3
Aubel	1
Diest	3
Westerlo	1
R Charleroi SC	0
Gent	3
ROC Charleroi	0
Beerschot	2
Wervik	1
Wetteren	0
Standard Liège	1
Club Brugge	6
Mouscron	0
Zwarte Leeuw	0
Sint-Truiden	4
Aalst	3
Hoogstraten	0
Francs Borains	0
Beveren	2
Heultje	3
Molenbeek	2
Sint-Niklase	0
Germinal Ekeren	4
Berchem Sport	2
Turnhout	3
Harelbeke	0
Boom	2
Beringen	2
Geel	0

2nd Round
Leuven	1
Genk	2
Waregem	3
Eeklo	1
KV Mechelen	3
Seraing	1
Lokeren	2
Lierse	0
Tongeren	0
Hoeselt	0
FC Liège	4
Kortrijk	0
Eendracht Zele	2
Lommel	5
Cercle Brugge	0
Anderlecht	1
Ourodenberg-Aarschot	2
KRC Mechelen	1
Diest	3
Westerlo	2
Gent	2
Beerschot	0
Standard Liège	3
Club Brugge	2
Sint-Truiden	3
Aalst	1
Beveren	4
Heultje	1
Germinal Ekeren	3
Turnhout	0
Boom	1
Beringen	0

3rd Round
Genk	0	3
Waregem	1	2
KV Mechelen	1	2
Lokeren	3	1
Hoeselt	0	1
FC Liège	1	6
Lommel	1	1
Anderlecht	5	4
Ourodenberg-Aarschot	1	0
Diest	1	4
Gent	5	0
Standard Liège	2	4
Sint-Truiden	1	3
Beveren	1	0
Germinal Ekeren	1	2
Boom	0	2

Quarterfinals
Genk	0	1
Lokeren	1	0
FC Liège	1	2
Anderlecht	0	2
Diest	2	0
Standard Liège	3	7
Sint-Truiden	0	0
Germinal Ekeren	3	6

Semifinals
Lokeren	0	0
FC Liège	1	3
Finals
FC Liège	2
Germinal Ekeren	1
Standard Liège	1	0
Germinal Ekeren	0	1

=== Final ===
19 May 1990

FC Liège	2–1	Germinal Ekeren
Ernes 3'; Malbaša 83'		Hofmans 15'

Heysel Stadium, Brussels
