= Walter Potts (footballer) =

English footballer (1876–?)

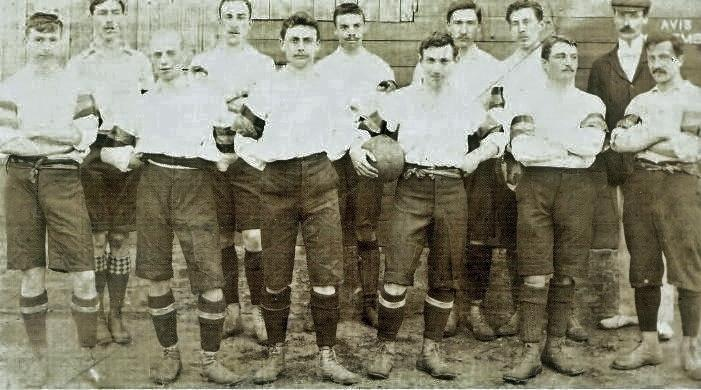
- Potts (first from right) in 1901

Personal information
- Date of birth: 6 August 1876
- Place of birth: Sheerness, Kent, England

Senior career*
Years	Team	Apps	(Gls)
1899–1900	Antwerp		
1900–1903	Beerschot AC		

International career
1901–1902	Belgium XI (unofficial)	2	(2)
- * Club domestic league appearances and goals

Walter Potts (born 6 August 1876) was an English footballer who played for Belgian clubs Antwerp and Beerschot AC between 1899 and 1905.

== Club career ==
Walter Potts and his younger brother Herbert were strikers for Antwerp FC at the end of the 19th century, making his debut against FC Liégeois on 12 November 1899, and helping his side to a 5–3 win, thus ending Liégeois' 23-match unbeaten run. In the 1899–1900 Belgian First Division, they narrowly missed out on reaching the national final after losing a tie-breaker playoff to Racing de Bruxelles 1–0.

Following this, the majority of the players and the Potts brothers left the club to join the newly founded Beerschot AC under the chairmanship of Max Elsen and later in the season Paul Havenith. Whilst his brother Herbert was named the captain of the football team, Walter was named vice-captain of the cricket team, but despite this, he still started in the club's first official match on 21 October 1900, which ended in a 10–2 victory over FC Brugeois. In his first season the club, Beerschot became vice-champions of Belgium, falling just one point short of the winners Racing.

Their runner-up finish allowed them to compete in the 1901 edition of the Challenge International du Nord in Tourcoing, where Potts helped his club win its first-ever piece of silverware after beating Léopold Club de Bruxelles 2–0 in the final on 12 May.

== International career ==
On 28 April 1901, Potts participated in the very first match of a Belgian national team at the 1901 Coupe Vanden Abeele, scoring his side's final goal in an 8–0 trashing of a third-rate Dutch side. He was one of four Beerschot players to feature in this match, the others being his brother, Jan Robyns, and captain Albert Friling; however, this match is not officially recognized by FIFA because of the presence of foreign players in the Belgium side, including the Potts brothers. He also played in the second match on 5 January 1902, this time against a second-rate Dutch side, in which he scored the only goal of the game to seal a 1–0 victory.

== Career statistics ==
Scores and results list Belgium's goal tally first, score column indicates score after each Potts goal.

List of international goals scored by Walter Potts
No.	Date	Venue	Opponent	Score	Result	Competition
1	28 April 1901	Olympic Stadium, Antwerp, Belgium	Netherlands	8–0	8–0	Coupe Vanden Abeele
2	5 January 1902	Olympic Stadium, Antwerp, Belgium	Netherlands	1–0	1–0	Coupe Vanden Abeele

== Honours ==
Beerschot

- Belgian First Division runner-up: 1900–01
- Challenge International du Nord: 1901
