= Herbert Potts =

English footballer (1878–c.1939)

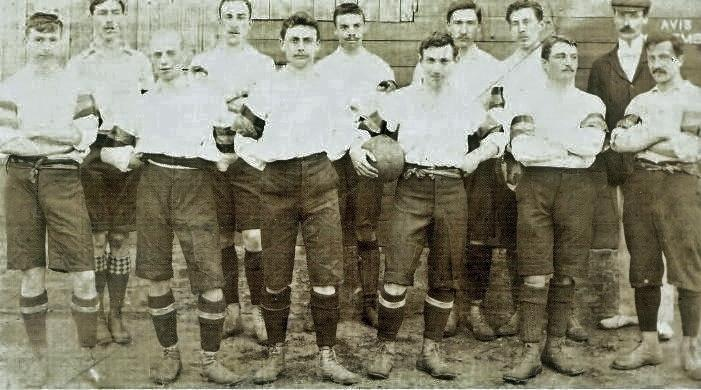
- Potts (first from left) in 1901

Personal information
- Full name: Herbert Alfred Potts
- Date of birth: 30 January 1878
- Place of birth: Sheerness, Kent, England
- Position: Forward

Senior career*
Years	Team	Apps	(Gls)
1898–1900	Antwerp		
1900–1905	Beerschot AC		

International career
1901–1904	Belgium XI (unofficial)	4	(12)
- * Club domestic league appearances and goals

Herbert Alfred Potts (30 January 1878 – before 1939) was an English footballer who played for Belgian clubs Antwerp and Beerschot AC between 1898 and 1905.

== Club career ==
Herbert Potts and his older brother Walter were strikers for Antwerp FC at the end of the 19th century, making his debut against FC Liégeois on 30 October 1898, which ended in a 2–4 loss. In the 1899–1900 Belgian First Division, they narrowly missed out on reaching the national final after losing a tie-breaker playoff to Racing de Bruxelles 0–1. Following this, the majority of the players and the Potts brothers left the club to join the newly founded Beerschot AC under the chairmanship of Max Elsen and later in the season Paul Havenith. He was named the captain of the football team, and started in the club's first official match on 21 October 1900, which ended in a 10–2 victory over FC Brugeois. In his first season the club, Beerschot became vice-champions of Belgium, falling just one point short of the winners Racing.

Their runner-up finish allowed them to compete in the 1901 edition of the Challenge International du Nord in Tourcoing, where Potts helped his club win its first-ever piece of silverware after beating Léopold Club de Bruxelles 2–0 in the final on 12 May.

Potts was the topscorer in the Belgian First Division in the 1900–01 and 1901–02 seasons, with 26 and 16 goals respectively, with the former tally possible being a record at the time until Gustave Vanderstappen broke it with 30 goals in the 1903–04 season. He stayed loyal to Beerschot until 1905, when he retired at the age of 27.

== International career ==
Potts featured in four unofficial matches with the Belgium national team between 1901 and 1904, in which he represented Belgium in friendly cup duels against the Netherlands. In his debut at the 1901 Coupe Vanden Abeele on 28 April 1901, he scored 7 of his side's 8 goals, the eight coming from his brother Walter. In total, he scored 12 goals in those 4 caps, resulting in a strike rate of 3 goals per game.

== Retirement ==
After retiring, he returned to England and worked in the import business.

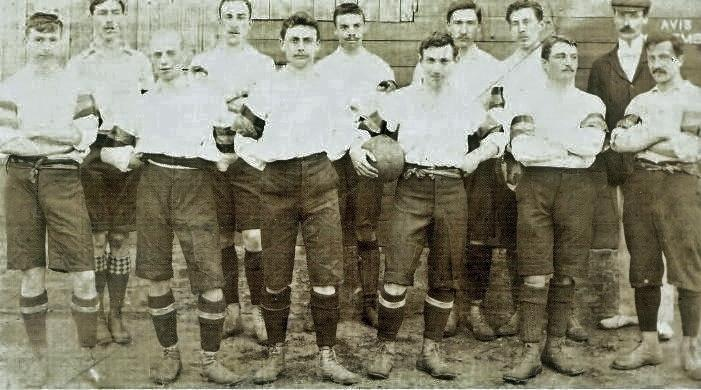
Potts featured in the first (unofficial) Belgium A-squad in 1901 (front row, first person from the left) along with his brother and two other Englishmen.

== Career statistics ==
Scores and results list Belgium's goal tally first, score column indicates score after each Potts goal.

List of international goals scored by Herbert Potts
No.	Date	Venue	Opponent	Score	Result	Competition
1	28 April 1901	Olympic Stadium, Antwerp, Belgium	Netherlands	1–0	8–0	Coupe Vanden Abeele
2	28 April 1901	Olympic Stadium, Antwerp, Belgium	Netherlands	2–0	8–0	Coupe Vanden Abeele
3	28 April 1901	Olympic Stadium, Antwerp, Belgium	Netherlands	3–0	8–0	Coupe Vanden Abeele
4	28 April 1901	Olympic Stadium, Antwerp, Belgium	Netherlands	4–0	8–0	Coupe Vanden Abeele
5	28 April 1901	Olympic Stadium, Antwerp, Belgium	Netherlands	6–0	8–0	Coupe Vanden Abeele
6	28 April 1901	Olympic Stadium, Antwerp, Belgium	Netherlands	7–0	8–0	Coupe Vanden Abeele
7	28 April 1901	Olympic Stadium, Antwerp, Belgium	Netherlands	8–0	8–0	Coupe Vanden Abeele
8	15 December 1902	Olympic Stadium, Antwerp, Belgium	Netherlands	2–1	2–1	Coupe Vanden Abeele
9	3 January 1904	Olympic Stadium, Antwerp, Belgium	Netherlands	1–0	6–4	Coupe Vanden Abeele
10	3 January 1904	Olympic Stadium, Antwerp, Belgium	Netherlands	2–1	6–4	Coupe Vanden Abeele
11	3 January 1904	Olympic Stadium, Antwerp, Belgium	Netherlands	4–2	6–4	Coupe Vanden Abeele
12	3 January 1904	Olympic Stadium, Antwerp, Belgium	Netherlands	6–4	6–4	Coupe Vanden Abeele

== Honours ==
=== Club ===
Beerschot

- Belgian First Division vice-champions: 1900–01
- Challenge International du Nord champions: 1901

=== Individual ===
- Belgian First Division top scorer: 1900–01 (26 goals), 1901-02 (16 goals)
