= 1901 Coupe Vanden Abeele =

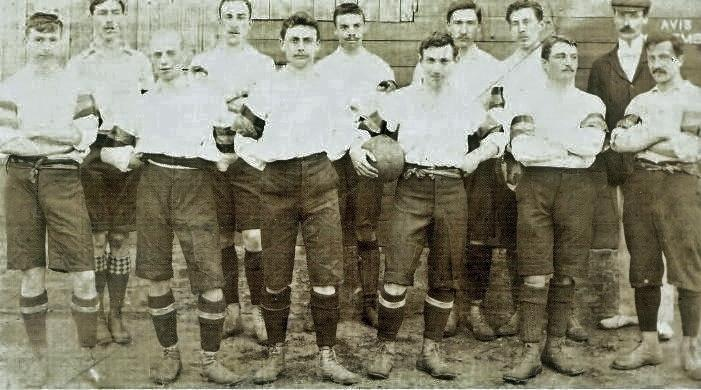
- The first Belgian selection
- Event: Pioneering football game in the Netherlands
Belgium	Netherlands
Belgium	Netherlands
8	0
- Date: 28 April 1901
- Venue: Beerschot A.C. ground, Antwerp
- Referee: Charles Maggee
- Attendance: 300

The 1901 Coupe Vanden Abeele (English: Vanden Abeele Cup) was a friendly football match held at the ground of Beerschot A.C. in Antwerp, on 28 April 1901. That match was contested by representative teams of Belgium and the Netherlands, and ended in a 8–0 win to the Belgians, but more important than the result was its historical significance, as it was the first international football match played in continental Europe, official or otherwise.

The cup was named in honor of the donator of the trophy, Frédéric Vanden Abeele, the Antwerp football director, who organized this match after the huge success of the first edition of the Coupe Van der Straeten Ponthoz in 1900. Due to schedule issues, the Dutch side was ultimately mostly formed by players from a third-level Rotterdam club, Celeritas, at the initiative of its captain, J.C. Jirris, together with Cees van Hasselt, a former Sparta player. This match is not considered official by FIFA because neither team can be considered a full national team since the Netherlands was only represented by players from South Netherlands (Rotterdam) while Belgium had the presence of English players in its squad, such as center-forward Herbert Potts, who scored 7 of "Belgium's" 8 goals. Likewise, in those games the Netherlands was announced under the name of "Van Hasselt XI", while the hosts were announced as an All-Belgian League XI.

== Background ==
During the Easter period of 1900, the Léopold FC organized the first edition of the Coupe Van der Straeten Ponthoz, an international tournament for clubs. After the tournament's huge success, Beerschot AC, on whose field the cup was contested, began planning to organize a similar event.

On 11 October 1900, Jorge Diaz, the honorary president of the club announced a second challenge to see the best teams in Europe compete in Antwerp. However, the organizers encountered difficulties because the project did not arouse the enthusiasm of the clubs, so an alternative was then proposed: pitting the selections of the best players from the Belgian championship against foreign opponents. In order to create greater interest and motivation, Frédéric Van den Abeele, whose son was the secretary of Beerschot, offered a trophy to the winners. In February 1901, the Comité voor den beker-Vanden Abeele invited a Dutch eleven to travel to Antwerp to contest the so-called Coupe Vanden Abeele against an All-Belgium side during the Easter holiday. However, the Easter weekend was already planned for the second edition of the Coupe Van der Straeten Ponthoz in Brussels, so the match had to be delayed by three weeks, and since many Dutch clubs had league commitments on the new date, the Dutch team fell apart.

The match was thus on the verge of being canceled, so Abeele personally hired Cees van Hasselt, a former Sparta player and a tailor in Rotterdam who had traveled to Antwerp for this match, to quickly assemble a Dutch team to play the game. Van Hasselt managed to convince his friend Jirris, the then captain of Rotterdam club side Celeritas, a club from a third-level competition, and thanks to Hasselt's efforts, this squad was then strengthened by three players from another Rotterdam club, Olympia, which was also a third-level side. The Belgian squad, on the other hand, was chosen in a secret vote by the representatives of clubs affiliated to the Belgian Football Association, which was made public on 6 March, and included some Englishmen, such as Beerschot's Walter and Herbert Potts. It was ultimately decided that the tournament would come down to a single game between the All-Belgium side and this Dutch selection brought together by Van Hasselt.

== Build-up ==
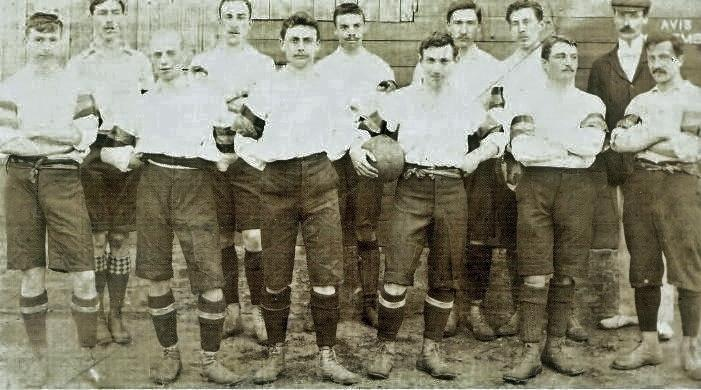
The first incarnation of the Belgium national team on 28 April 1901. Back from left: Harry Menzies, Georges Simon, Fernand Defalle, Hughes Ryan, Gustave Pelgrims, Charles Maggee. Front from left: Herbert Potts, Jan Robyns, Ernest Gillon, Albert Friling, Lucien Londot, Walter Potts.

In order to prepare as best as possible, the "Vanden Abeele squad" played a preparatory match against a team made up of officers of Hounslow's Royal Fusiliers on 23 March in Brussels.

Since the figure of a coach as we know it today did not yet exist, it was Hasselt and Jirris who, as the captain of the team, were in charge of making up the line-ups and dictating the tactics to be followed. Some of the players initially selected for the Belgian side on 6 March are curiously absent and replaced in the team for unknown reasons, probably due to injury or professional unavailability. Notably, none of the four designated players from the Racing Club de Bruxelles, Alphonse Renier, Camille Van Hoorden, Paul Chibert, and René Feye, appear in the starting eleven, which can be explained by the fact that on the same day of the meeting, Racing played a match against the English team from Tunbridge Wells, which they won 4–2.

== Overview ==
The match took place on Sunday 28 April 1901 at the ground of Beerschot A.C. in front of 300 spectators. Admission was free and there were plenty of curious friends of the town's football players. The game was refereed by a certain Charles Maggee. Naturally, the hosts, whose team was announced as an All-Belgium XI and included four Englishmen resident in Belgium, had little trouble claiming the Coupe Vanden Abeele after an 8–0 victory. The star of the match was the English man Herbert Potts, who netted 7 of the Belgian goals.

== Final details ==
28 April 1901
1901 Coupe Vanden Abeele

Belgium	8 – 0	Netherlands ("van Hasselt XI")
H. Potts; Potts	Report

Beerschot A.C. ground, Antwerp, Belgium
Attendance: 300
Referee: Charles Maggee

GK	1	(Belgium) Fernand Defalle (FC Liégeois)
DF	2	(Belgium) Albert Friling (C) (Beerschot AC)
DF	3	(Belgium) Georges Simon (Racing Club de Bruxelles)
MF	4	(Belgium) Jan Robyns (Beerschot AC)
MF	5	(Belgium) Gustave Pelgrims (Léopold CB)
MF	6	(England) Hughes Ryan (Léopold CB)
FW	7	(Belgium) Ernest Gillon (Athletic & Running)
FW	8	(England) Henry Menzies (FC Liégeois)
FW	9	(England) Herbert Potts (Beerschot AC)
FW	10	(England) Walter Potts (Beerschot AC)
FW	11	(Belgium) Lucien Londot (FC Liégeois)

GK	1	(Netherlands) Rommenhöller (Celeritas)
DF	2	(Netherlands) J.C. Jirris (C) (Celeritas)
DF	3	(Netherlands) J. van Gelder (Celeritas)
MF	4	(Netherlands) De Wilde (Celeritas)
MF	5	(Netherlands) G.E. Bakker (Celeritas)
MF	6	(Netherlands) A. Holzenbosch (Celeritas)
FW	7	(Netherlands) H. Breuning (Olympia)
FW	8	(Netherlands) H. Bessem Nicolaaszoon (Celeritas)
FW	9	(Netherlands) G. van de Zee (Olympia)
FW	10	(Netherlands) C. Breuning (Olympia)
FW	11	(Netherlands) F. Vermaat (Celeritas)

== Legacy ==
The next three editions of the Coupe Vanden Abeele saw the Dutch represented by sides selected and organized by Cees van Hasselt. As a result of the games not being sanctioned by the Royal Dutch Football Association (KNVB), only players from the second division were available to Van Hasselt, so Belgium also won those three editions, although with more leveled scores (1–0, 2–1 and 6–4).

Although the dirigents of this cup only intended to create another international club tournament, they instead had just witnessed what is now considered the first-ever (unofficial) match between Belgium and the Netherlands. This match took place a year earlier than the first official international match played in continental Europe between Austria and Hungary on 12 October 1902.

== See also ==
- 1902 Austria v Hungary football match
