= Henry Menzies (cricketer) =

English cricketer and footballer

Personal information
- Born: 28 March 1867; Lambeth, London, England
- Died: 7 March 1936 (aged 68); North Farnborough, Hampshire, England
- Batting: Right-handed
- Role: Wicketkeeper

Domestic team information
- Years: Team
- 1890–91: Cambridge
- 1891–93: Middlesex

Henry Menzies (28 March 1867 – 7 March 1936) was an English first-class cricketer active 1891–93 who played for Middlesex.

== Cricket career ==
Henry Menzies was born on 28 March 1867 in Lambeth, London. He was a very good wicket-keeper who was unfortunate enough to be at Cambridge at the same time as Gregor McGregor, thus having no chance of getting his Blue. A well-known Free Forester, he played five times for Middlesex in 1891–93, including in a County Championship match against Kent on 23 August 1893, which Middlesex lost by 12 runs.

== Death ==
Menzies died in North Farnborough, Hampshire on 7 March 1936, at the age of 68.
