= Union F.C. d'Ixelles =

Belgian football club

Union FC
- Full name: Union Football Club d'Ixelles
- Founded: 1892; 133 years ago
- Dissolved: 1901; 124 years ago
- League: Belgian First Division A
- 1895–96: 7th
Home colours	Away colours

Union Football Club d'Ixelles was a Belgian football club that took part in the first Belgian Championship in 1895. They finished 7th and therefore last in the league, which resulted in their relegation, and they were never able to come close to returning to the top flight. The club then dissolved in 1901.

The club managed to get a 1–0 win in the 1895–96 season against Racing Club de Bruxelles.
