= 1900–01 Belgian First Division =

6th season of top-tier football in Belgium

Belgian First Division
- Season: 1900–01

Statistics of Belgian First Division in the 1900–01 season.

== Locations of teams ==
Location of teams in the 1900–01 Belgian First Division

== Overview ==
This season saw the two Groups of previous seasons merged back into one national Division.
It was contested by 9 teams, and Racing Club de Bruxelles won the championship.

== League standings ==
Pos	Team	Pld	W	D	L	GF	GA	GD	Pts
1	Racing Club de Bruxelles	16	10	6	0	44	11	+33	26
2	Beerschot A.C.	16	11	3	2	47	21	+26	25
3	Léopold Club de Bruxelles	16	10	3	3	37	20	+17	23
4	Athletic and Running Club de Bruxelles	16	7	4	5	39	26	+13	18
5	Skill F.C. de Bruxelles	16	5	3	8	36	30	+6	13
6	F.C. Liégeois	16	5	3	8	21	29	−8	13
7	Verviers F.C.	16	6	0	10	19	43	−24	12
8	F.C. Brugeois	16	2	4	10	10	45	−35	8
9	C.S. Brugeois	16	1	4	11	16	44	−28	6

== Results ==
Home \ Away	BEE	CSB	FCB	ARC	LÉO	RCB	SKI	FCL	VER
Beerschot		10–2	2–0	1–0	2–1	2–2	5–3	5–0 (Note: Match awarded.)	2–0
CS Brugeois	0–3		0–0	3–3	0–1	1–2	1–1	4–1	1–2
FC Brugeois	0–3	2–2		2–0	0–1	1–4	5–0	2–2	2–3
Athletic Club Bruxelles	3–1	6–0	9–0		1–1	1–1	2–2	5–0	1–0
Léopold	3–2	3–1	6–1	3–5		0–0	3–1	6–0	5–0
Racing Bruxelles	1–1	4–1	5–0	4–0	1–1		5–0	5–0	8–0
Skill Bruxelles	3–3	7–0	7–0	3–2	2–3	1–4		5–0	4–2
Liège	2–4	3–0	0–0	3–2	3–1	2–2	2–0		3–2
Verviers	1–6	5–0	1–0	2–4	1–4	0–6	3–2	2–1	

Legend: Blue = home team win; Yellow = draw; Red = away team win.

== See also ==
- 1900–01 in Belgian football
