= RFC Liège =

Belgian football club

Liège
- Full name: Royal Football Club de Liège
- Nicknames: Les Sang et Marine (The Blood and Marine)
- Founded: 1892; 134 years ago
- Ground: Stade de Rocourt, Liège
- Capacity: 3,500
- Chairman: Jean-Paul Lacomble
- Head coach: Gaëtan Englebert
- League: Challenger Pro League
- 2025–26: Challenger Pro League, 4th of 17
- Website: www.fcliege.be
Home colours	Away colours

Royal Football Club de Liège (more commonly known as RFC Liège) is a professional football club based in Liège, capital of Liège Province, Belgium. The team currently play in Challenger Pro League, the second tier in Belgian football. Its matricule is 4, meaning that it was the fourth club to register with the country's national federation (founded 1895), and the club was the first Belgian champion in history (5 Championships & 1 Cup). The 'philosophy' of the club is based on integration of local young players and on popular and faithful support. The club was also known for being 'homeless' between 1995 and 2015, but is now playing on its own ground in the Rocourt area of Liège.

In 1990, FC Liège precipitated a ground-breaking ruling for European football, when its refusal to release Jean-Marc Bosman after his contract ran out led to the Bosman ruling, a European Court of Justice decision that caused major changes to the structure of European football.

== History ==
=== Early history ===
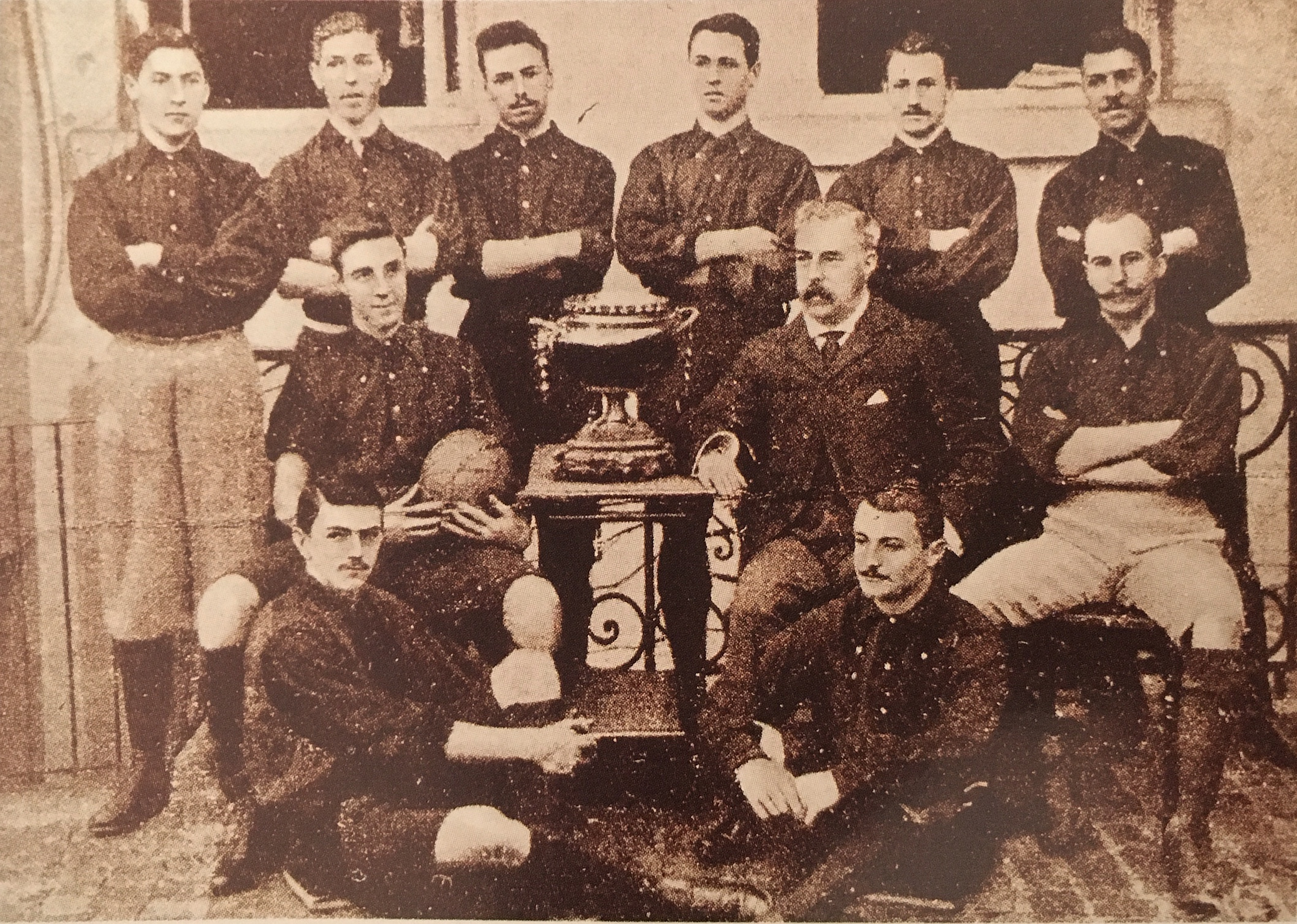
RFC Liège Club, the first Belgian Champion in 1896. Alfred Wahl, La balle au pied : Histoire du football (p. 53), "Découvertes Gallimard" collection (vol. 83).

The city of Liège was introduced to football at the end of the 19th century by English workers, and the Parc de la Boverie, which housed a velodrome, quickly became the home for the first football players in the region. The cyclists were also among the first to take an interest in this new sport, which allowed them to train during the winter months.

On 14 February 1892, Liège Football Club was founded by members of the Liège Cyclist's Union, who also organized the first edition of the "Liège-Bastogne-Liège", the oldest cycling race, on the same day. The club's first official match took place in Brussels against a Brussels FA XI, and lost the match 4–0 on a 200 x 100-metre pitch. The club's registrations quickly increased, and the Liège team took its revenge against the Brussels FA on a new ground located in the gardens of the Château de Sclessin, this time wearing red and blue jerseys in homage to the London-based English club Dulwich Hamlet.

In 1895, Liège FC became an inaugural member of the Belgian Football Association as Football Club Liégeois (FC Liégeois), and the club won the subsequent inaugural national championship of Belgium in 1895–96, thus becoming first-ever Belgian Champion. Most of the members of that first squad were Belgian, such as Fernand Defalle, Lucien Londot, Ernest Moreau de Melen, Gérard Kleinermann, but also had Englishmen, such as Treharne Reeves, Samuel Hickson, who was the top scorer of the inaugural edition, and Harry Menzies, who was the son of the club's president Ronald Menzies. Londot and Moreau de Melen went on to represent Belgium in the football tournament at the 1900 Summer Olympics, while Londot, Defalle, and Menzies went on to feature in the first-ever match of a Belgium national team at the 1901 Coupe Vanden Abeele on 28 April.

Liège won back-to-back titles in 1898 and 1899, beating FC Brugeois 6–3 in the two-legged final of 1899. During this period, Liégeois had an unbeaten run of 23 official matches that lasted over two years, between 28 February 1897 and 12 November 1899, coming to an end in a 3–5 loss to Antwerp FC. However, Liège FC eventually bowed to the superiority of the Brussels teams, which marked the beginning of the dark years since they were the first former Belgian champions to be relegated to the second division.

In 1920 the prefix Royal was, when the club changed its name to Royal Football Club Liégeois (RFC Liégeois). Its name had been shortened to RFC Liège by the time of its consecutive championships in 1952 and 1953, the only clubs able to contest a dominating streak by Anderlecht, which won the three championships before (1949–1951) and after (1954–1956). RFC Liégeois reached the 1963–64 Inter-Cities Fairs Cup semi-finals, losing in three games against the eventual winner of the Cup, Spain's Real Zaragoza. Between 1965 and 1985, there were poor results, and the club survived with the help of its own tradition: young players coming from inside the club, and faithful supporters.

At the end of the 1980s, RFC Liège played in European competitions, facing such notable clubs as Benfica, Juventus, Rapid Vienna, Hibernian, Werder Bremen and Athletic Bilbao. The club won a Belgian Cup in 1990.

In 1990, the club forced French club Dunkerque to pay a transfer fee for Jean-Marc Bosman, although his contract had expired with the RFC Liège. Dunkerque refused to pay the fee, resulting in a series of lawsuits which led to the Bosman ruling in 1995.

=== Recent history ===
In 1995, the club faced bankruptcy when its stadium, Stade Vélodrome de Rocourt, was sold and demolished to build a movie theatre. To survive, the club joined with R.F.C. Tilleur-Saint-Nicolas, based in the Liège suburb of Saint-Nicolas, to become R. Tilleur F.C. de Liège.

The club went down from the First Division (which it had not left since 1945) to the Third Division. The word Tilleur was dropped from the team name in 2000, returning to "RFC Liège". From 1995 to 2009, the club moved between the Second and Third Divisions, with two Third Division titles in 1996 and 2008.

In 2008–09, the club played in the Second Division, but suffered back-to-back relegations, dropping to the Fourth Division in April 2011. During the 2010–11 season, RFC Liège played its 3000th match and scored its 5000th goal at national level.

In the 2015–16 season, RFC Liège plays in Division 3. RFC Liège holds the Belgian record for the number of seasons played at national level with 117 seasons between 1896 and 2019, having played a total of 67 seasons in D1, including 50 consecutive seasons (1950–1995), 28 seasons in D2, 11 seasons in D3, and 2 seasons in D4. Liège FC still is the only club that has played all its seasons (117 as of 2019–20) at a national level, versus county or local levels, having won a total of five First Division championships: 1896, 1898, 1899, 1952 and 1953, thus being the 6th most successful (active) Belgian club, only behind Beerschot (7), Standard (10), Union Saint-Gilloise (11), FC Bruges (13), and Anderlecht (31).

In the 2022–23 season, RFC Liège confirmed promotion to Challenger Pro League from 2023–24 after draw 0–0 at Tienen on Matchweek 35. On 14 May 2023, the club finished runner-up of Belgian National Division 1 in 2022–23 season.

== Stadium ==
Starting in 1921, RFC Liège played in Stade Vélodrome de Rocourt, in the suburban municipality of Rocourt. Rocourt became part of the city of Liège in 1977. The stadium was sold, and demolished, in 1995, earning RFC Liège the nickname 'homeless'.

Between 1995 and 2015, RFC Liège played in Tilleur (1995–2000), Seraing (2000–2004), Ans (2004–2008), and Seraing again (Pairay Stadium, 2008–2015).

In 2015 the club returned to Rocourt, playing its home matches in the new Stade de Rocourt.

== Current squad ==
As of 21 September 2026

Note: Flags indicate national team as defined under FIFA eligibility rules; some limited exceptions apply. Players may hold more than one non-FIFA nationality.

No.	Pos.	Nation	Player
1	GK	MAR	Alexis André Jr.
2	DF	COD	Élie Kitoko
4	MF	SEN	Biran Wane
5	DF	BEL	Pierre-Yves Ngawa
6	MF	ALB	Kevin Shkurti
7	MF	BEL	Benoît Bruggeman
8	MF	MAR	Kays Ruiz-Atil
9	FW	LUX	Arnold Qevani
10	FW	BEL	Kylian Hazard
11	MF	TUN	Nacim Dendani
12	GK	BEL	Oregan Ravet
13	FW	BEL	Damien Mouchamps
14	MF	BEL	Valentin Guillaume

No.	Pos.	Nation	Player
15	FW	KEN	Ryan Ogam (on loan from Wolfsberger)
16	DF	FRA	Eric N'Jo
17	MF	BEL	Afonso N'Salambi
18	MF	BEL	Simon Paulet
19	FW	EGY	Adham Refai (on loan from El Gouna)
20	FW	BEL	Naël Lawson
21	GK	BEL	Thomas Wauters
22	GK	BEL	Joshua Mpenza
23	MF	BEL	Stephen Reynaerts
24	MF	BFA	Ousmane Camara
25	DF	BEL	Jonathan D'Ostilio (captain)
28	MF	BEL	Reno Wilmots
—	FW	GAB	Harrison Ondo-Eyi

== Former players ==
- (France) Tarik Kharif
- (Bosnia and Herzegovina) Tarik Hodžić

== Staff ==
Head coach: (Belgium) Gaëtan Englebert
Assistant coach: (Belgium) Eric Deflandre
Goalkeeper coach: (Belgium) Pierre Drouguet

== Honours ==
=== League ===
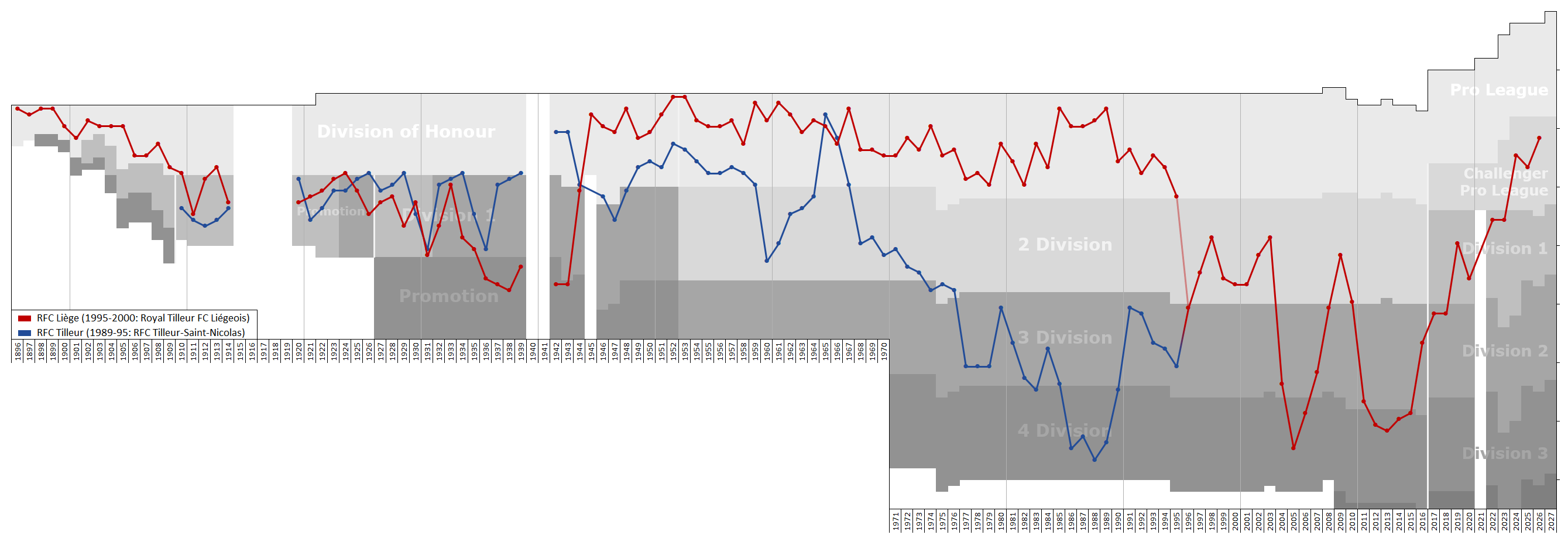
Historical chart of RFC Liege league performance

- Belgian First Division
  - Champions (5): 1895–96, 1897–98, 1898–99, 1951–52, 1952–53
  - Runners-up: 1896–97, 1958–59, 1960–61
- Belgian Second Division
  - Winners: 1911–12, 1922–23, 1943–44
- Belgian Third Division
  - Winners: 1942–43, 1995–96, 2006–07
- Belgian Fourth Division
  - Winners: 2014–15
- Belgian National Division 1
  - Runner-up: 2022–23

=== Cups ===
- Belgian Cup
  - Winners: 1989–90
  - Runners-up: 1986–87
- Belgian League Cup
  - Winners: 1986
  - Runners-up: 1973
