= 1897–98 Belgian First Division =

3rd season of top-tier football in Belgium

Belgian First Division
- Season: 1897–98

The 1897–98 Belgian First Division was a season of the Belgian First Division, the top-level association football league in Belgium. In its third year of operation, the league was contested by five teams. F.C. Liégeois won the championship.

== League standings ==
Pos	Team	Pld	W	D	L	GF	GA	GD	Pts
1	F.C. Liégeois	8	6	2	0	30	5	+25	14
2	Racing Club de Bruxelles	8	4	2	2	18	7	+11	10
3	Léopold Club de Bruxelles	8	2	4	2	17	23	−6	8
4	Athletic and Running Club de Bruxelles	8	2	2	4	11	17	−6	6
5	Antwerp F.C.	8	1	0	7	7	31	−24	2

== Results ==
Home \ Away	ANT	ARC	LÉO	RCB	FCL
Antwerp		7–0	0–5	0–5	0–5
Athletic Club Bruxelles	5–0 (Note: Match awarded.)		0–5	3–1	0–6
Léopold	– (Note: The match between Léopold and Antwerp was canceled after being postponed three times.)	1–1		0–5	1–1
Racing Bruxelles	4–0	11–2	1–1		1–1
Liège	5–0	5–0	5–2	2–1	

Legend: Blue = home team win; Yellow = draw; Red = away team win.

== See also ==
- 1897–98 in Belgian football
