= 1895–96 Belgian First Division =

1st season of top-tier football in Belgium

Belgian First Division
- Season: 1895–96

Statistics of Belgian First Division in the 1895–96 season.

== Overview ==
Location of teams in Belgian First Division 1895–96

It was contested by 7 teams, and F.C. Liégeois won the championship.

== League standings ==
Pos	Team	Pld	W	D	L	GF	GA	GD	Pts	
1	F.C. Liégeois	12	9	2	1	32	11	+21	20	
2	Antwerp F.C.	12	7	0	5	33	13	+20	14	
3	Sporting Club de Bruxelles	12	6	1	5	31	29	+2	13	
4	Léopold Club de Bruxelles	12	6	0	6	31	29	+2	12	
5	Racing Club de Bruxelles	12	6	0	6	32	31	+1	12	
6	F.C. Brugeois	12	5	1	6	22	21	+1	11	Not participating next season.
7	Union F.C. d'Ixelles	12	1	0	11	5	51	−46	2	Not participating next season.

== Results ==
Home \ Away	ANT	FCB	LÉO	FCL	RCB	SCB	UNI
Antwerp		3–2	2–3	1–3	5–0	8–0	5–0 (Note: Match awarded.)
FC Brugeois	0–2		5–0	1–2	3–0	2–3	3–1
Léopold	3–2	2–3		1–6	3–7	2–1	9–0
Liège	5–0	1–1	3–1		4–1	5–0	5–0
Racing Bruxelles	1–0	3–3	3–4	3–2		6–1	0–1
Sporting CB	1–4	3–2	2–0	2–2	5–2		4–2
Union d'Ixelles	0–6	1–2	0–3	0–9	0–6	0–9	

Legend: Blue = home team win; Yellow = draw; Red = away team win.

== See also ==
- 1895–96 in Belgian football
