= 1898–99 Belgian First Division =

4th season of top-tier football in Belgium

Belgian First Division
- Season: 1898–99

Statistics of Belgian First Division in the 1898–99 season.

== Overview ==
Location of teams in Belgian First Division 1898–99

This season saw a number of new clubs enter the Championship. along with a new format.
It was contested by 9 teams, and F.C. Liégeois won the championship.

== League standings ==
=== Championship Group A ===
| Pos | Team | Pld | W | D | L | GF | GA | GD | Pts | Qualification | FCL | RCB | LÉO | ARC | ANT |
|---|---|---|---|---|---|---|---|---|---|---|---|---|---|---|---|
| 1 | Liége | 8 | 8 | 0 | 0 | 31 | 5 | +26 | 16 | Qualified for Play-off Final | | 6–1 | 5–0 (Note: Match awarded.) | 5–0 | 5–0 |
| 2 | Racing Bruxelles | 8 | 4 | 0 | 4 | 30 | 22 | +8 | 8 | | 0–3 | | 2–5 | 14–1 | 4–2 |
| 3 | Léopold | 8 | 3 | 1 | 4 | 23 | 21 | +2 | 7 | | 0–4 | 1–4 | | 1–1 | 4–0 |
| 4 | Athletic Club Bruxelles | 7 | 2 | 1 | 4 | 11 | 28 | −17 | 5 | | 2–5 | 3–0 | 4–3 | | 5–0 |
| 5 | Antwerp | 7 | 1 | 0 | 6 | 5 | 24 | −19 | 2 | | 2–4 | 0–5 | 1–3 | 6–2 | |

=== Championship Group B ===
Only the rankings are known.

| Pos | Team | Pld | W | D | L | GF | GA | GD | Pts | Qualification |
|---|---|---|---|---|---|---|---|---|---|---|
| 1 | FC Brugeois | 0 | ? | ? | ? | ? | ? | — | 0 | Qualified for Play-off Final |
| 2 | Oostendensche | 0 | ? | ? | ? | ? | ? | — | 0 | |
| 3 | Gantois | 0 | ? | ? | ? | ? | ? | — | 0 | |
| 4 | Sport Pédestre de Gand | 0 | ? | ? | ? | ? | ? | — | 0 | |

== Final ==
| Team 1 | Agg. | Team 2 | 1st leg | 2nd leg |
|---|---|---|---|---|
| Liége | 6 - 3 | FC Brugeois | 2 - 0 | 4 - 3 |

== See also ==
- 1898–99 in Belgian football
