= Netherlands national football team results (1905–1919) =

- Win Draw Loss

This is a list of the Netherlands national football team results from 1905 to 1919.

Between their first match in 1905 and 1919, the Netherlands played in 45 matches. Throughout this period they played in two Summer Olympics, in 1908 Summer Olympics and in 1912, and the Netherlands won the consolation tournaments of 1908 by walkover (France withdrew in the final) and got Bronze in 1912 after beating Finland 9-0 with 5 goals from Jan Vos.

== 1900s ==
=== 1905 ===
| 30 April 1905 1905 Coupe Vanden Abeele | Belgium | 1 – 4 (a.e.t.) | Netherlands | Antwerp, Belgium |
| 14:30 (UTC+0:00) | Stom 87' (o.g.) | Report | de Neve 80', 106', 117', 119' | Stadium: Beerschot A.C. ground Attendance: 800; Referee: Frank König (Belgium) |
Note: Eddy de Neve set the goal scoring record for Netherlands (4 goals)

| 14 May 1905 1905 Rotterdamsch Nieuwsblad Beker | Netherlands | 4 – 0 | Belgium | Rotterdam, Netherlands |
| 14:00 (UTC+0:20) | de Korver 74' de Neve 76' (pen.); Lutjens 80'; Kessler 84' | Report | | Stadium: Schuttersveld ground Attendance: 30,000; Referee: Henry Vermeulen (Netherlands) |
Note: Eddy de Neve set the goal scoring record for Netherlands (5 goals)

=== 1906 ===
| 29 April 1906 1906 Coupe Vanden Abeele | Belgium | 5 – 0 | Netherlands | Antwerp, Belgium |
| 14:30 (UTC+0:00) | Van den Eynde 15'; Goetinck 40'; De Veen 52', 68', 80' | Report | | Stadium: Beerschot A.C. ground Attendance: 2,000; Referee: Pat Harrower (England) |

| 13 May 1906 1906 Rotterdamsch Nieuwsblad Beker | Netherlands | 2 – 3 | Belgium | Rotterdam, Netherlands |
| 14:00 (UTC+0:20) | Muller 32' van der Vinne 54' | Report | Cambier 76', 88'; Destrebecq 81' | Stadium: Schuttersveld ground Attendance: 7,000; Referee: Frank König (Belgium) |

=== 1907 ===
| 1 April 1907 Friendly | Netherlands | 1 – 8 | England Amateurs | The Hague, Netherlands |
| | Blume 14' | Report | Mansfield 4'; Bell 5', 60'; Woodward 16'; Hardman 28', 47'; Hawkes 39'; Foster 73' | Stadium: De Diepput; Attendance: 8,000 |

| 14 April 1907 1907 Coupe Vanden Abeele | Belgium | 1 – 3 (a.e.t.) | Netherlands | Antwerp, Belgium |
| 14:30 (UTC+0:00) | Feye 31' | Report | van Gogh 74', 118'; Feith 99' | Stadium: Beerschot A.C. ground Attendance: 2,500; Referee: Pat Harrower (England) |

| 9 May 1907 1907 Rotterdamsch Nieuwsblad Beker | Netherlands | 1 – 2 | Belgium | Haarlem, Netherlands |
| 14:00 (UTC+0:20) | Feith 54' | Report | Feye 14'; Goetinck 60' | Stadium: De Hout; Attendance: 10,000; Referee: Ernest Holland (England) |

| 21 December 1907 Friendly | England Amateurs | 12 – 2 | Netherlands | Darlington, England |
| | Woodward 1', 31', 70'; W. Stapley 4', 10', 55', 59', 62'; Bell 11', 71', 84'; Raine 80' | Report | Ruffelse 36', 88' | Stadium: Feethams; Attendance: 3,000 |

=== 1908 ===
| 29 March 1908 1908 Coupe Vanden Abeele | Belgium | 1 – 4 | Netherlands | Antwerp, Belgium |
| 14:45 (UTC+0:00) | Vertongen 81' | Report | Ruffelse 12'; Thomée 50', 74' de Korver 85' | Stadium: Beerschot A.C. ground Attendance: 2,000; Referee: Pat Harrower (England) |

| 26 April 1908 1908 Rotterdamsch Nieuwsblad Beker | Netherlands | 3 – 1 | Belgium | Rotterdam, Netherlands |
| 14:00 (UTC+0:20) | Snethlage 22'; Thomée 50', 60' (pen.) | Report | Saeys 89' | Stadium: Prinsenlaan; Attendance: 6,000; Referee: Jack Howcroft (England) |

| 10 May 1908 Friendly | Netherlands | 4 – 1 | France | Rotterdam, Netherlands |
| | Snethlage 22', 76'; Thomee 24'; Akkersdijk 60' | Report | François 75' | Stadium: Prinsenlaan; Attendance: 3,000; Referee: Joseph Brauburger (Belgium) |

| 22 October 1908 1908 Summer Olympics Semi-finals | Great Britain | 4 – 0 | Netherlands | London, England |
| | Stapley 37', 60', 64', 75' | Report | | Stadium: White City; Attendance: 6,000; Referee: Jack Howcroft (Great Britain) |

| 23 October 1908 1908 Summer Olympics Bronze medal match | Netherlands | 2–0 | Sweden | London, England |
| | Reeman 6'; Snethlage 58' | Report | | Stadium: White City; Attendance: 1,000; Referee: Pearson (Great Britain). |
Note: The French were so shocked by their 17–1 defeat to Denmark that they withdrew both their main and B teams; meaning only the Netherlands and Sweden were left to play for the third place.

| 25 October 1908 Friendly | Netherlands | 5 – 3 | Sweden | The Hague, Netherlands |
| 14:30 (UTC+0:20) | Snethlage 6', 51'; Welcker 41'; Francken 49'; Thomée 73' | Report | Gustafsson 8', 28'; Ohlson 21' | Stadium: De Diepput; Attendance: 3,000; Referee: Joseph Brauburger (Belgium) |

=== 1909 ===
| 21 March 1909 1909 Coupe Vanden Abeele | Belgium | 1 – 4 | Netherlands | Antwerp, Belgium |
| 14:45 (UTC+0:00) | Poelmans 63' | Report | Snethlage 11'; Dé Kessler 19'; Welcker 38'; Lutjens 79' | Stadium: Beerschot A.C. ground Attendance: 6,000; Referee: Thomas Kyle (England) |

| 12 April 1909 Friendly | Netherlands | 0 – 4 | England Amateurs | Amsterdam, Netherlands |
| | | Report | Dunning 7', 36'; Porter 28'; H. Stapley 61' | Stadium: Sportpark Oud-Roosenburgh; Attendance: 15,000 |

| 25 April 1909 1909 Rotterdamsch Nieuwsblad Beker | Netherlands | 4 – 1 | Belgium | Rotterdam, Netherlands |
| 14:30 (UTC+0:20) | Lutjens 2'; Snethlage 21', 32', 54' | Report | Goossens 58' | Stadium: Prinsenlaan; Attendance: 10,000; Referee: Jack Howcroft (England) |
Note: Edu Snethlage set the goal scoring record for Netherlands (7 goals)

| 11 December 1909 Friendly | England Amateurs | 9 – 1 | Netherlands | Fullham, England |
| | Stapely 5', 85'; Woodward 9', 14', 21', 23', 60'; Owen 41'; Williams 89' | Report | Kessler 38' | Stadium: Stamford Bridge; Attendance: 5,274 |

== 1910s ==
=== 1910 ===
| 13 March 1910 1910 Coupe Vanden Abeele | Belgium | 3 – 2 (a.e.t.) | Netherlands | Antwerp, Belgium |
| 15:00 (UTC+0:00) | De Veen 19', 24'; Six 119' | Report | Lutjens 21'; Kessler 26' | Stadium: Beerschot A.C. ground Attendance: 8,500; Referee: Dicky Schumacher (London) |

| 10 April 1910 1910 Rotterdamsch Nieuwsblad Beker | Netherlands | 7 – 0 | Belgium | Haarlem, Netherlands |
| 14:30 (UTC+0:20) | Welcker 10', 28'; Francken 15', 45', 62'; Thomée 55', 80' | Report | | Stadium: De Hout; Attendance: 11,000; Referee: Jack Howcroft (England) |

| 24 April 1910 Friendly | Netherlands | 4–2 | Germany | Arnhem, Netherlands |
| 14:30 (UTC+0:20) | Lutjens 29'; Thomée 73', 87'; Hempel 82' (o.g.) | Report | Kipp 23'; Fick 42' | Stadium: Klarenbeek Stadium; Attendance: 10,000; Referee: Jack Howcroft (England) |
Note: Jan Thomée set the goal scoring record for Netherlands (10 goals)

| 16 October 1910 Friendly | Germany | 1–2 | Netherlands | Kleve, Germany |
| 15:30 (UTC+1:00) | Queck 25' | Report | Thomée 7' van Berckel 16' | Stadium: Sportplatz an der Triftstraße; Attendance: 4,000; Referee: Hubert Istace (Belgium) |

=== 1911 ===
| 19 March 1911 1911 Coupe Vanden Abeele | Belgium | 1 – 5 | Netherlands | Antwerp, Belgium |
| 15:00 (UTC+0:00) | Paternoster 78' | Report | Francken 8', 36', 55'; Thomée 83'; Welcker 83' | Stadium: Beerschot A.C. ground Attendance: 12,000; Referee: Dicky Schumacher (London) |
Note: Jan Thomée set the goal scoring record for Netherlands (12 goals)

| 2 April 1911 1911 Rotterdamsch Nieuwsblad Beker | Netherlands | 3 – 1 | Belgium | Haarlem, Netherlands |
| 14:30 (UTC+0:20) | Francken 28', 76' van Breda Kolff 29' | Report | Six 36' | Stadium: De Hout; Attendance: 9,000; Referee: George Miller (England) |

| 17 April 1911 Friendly | Netherlands | 0 – 1 | England Amateurs | Amsterdam, Netherlands |
| | | Report | Webb 24' | Stadium: Sportpark Oud-Roosenburgh; Attendance: 11,000; Referee: Herbert Willing (Netherlands) |

=== 1912 ===
| 10 March 1912 1912 Coupe Vanden Abeele | Belgium | 1–2 | Netherlands | Antwerp, Belgium |
| | Nisot 60' | Report | Thomée 58', 72' | Stadium: Olympic Stadium; Attendance: 9,225; Referee: Charles Crisp (England) |

| 16 March 1912 Friendly | England Amateurs | 4 – 0 | Netherlands | Hull, England |
| | Woodward 7', 12'; Bailey 24'; Wright 89' | Report | | Stadium: Anlaby Road; Attendance: 12,000; Referee: Thomas Dougray |

| 24 March 1912 International Friendly | Netherlands | 5–5 | Germany | Zwolle, Netherlands |
| 14:30 (UTC+0:20) | Thomée 5', 53'; Francken 34', 47'; Breunig 66' (o.g.) | Report | Fuchs 13'; Hirsch 14', 31', 75', 79' | Stadium: ZAC-Platz Veerallee; Attendance: 10,000; Referee: Jack Howcroft (England) |
Note: Highest scoring draw.

| 28 April 1912 1912 Rotterdamsch Nieuwsblad Beker | Netherlands | 4–3 | Belgium | Dordrecht, Netherlands |
| | Van Berckel 1'; M. Francken 2', 20', 62' | Report | Musch 27'; Nisot 43', 56' | Stadium: D.F.C.-terrein aan de Markettenweg; Attendance: 10,000; Referee: John Pearson (England) |

| 29 June 1912 1912 Olympic Games; First Round | Sweden | 3 – 4 (a.e.t.) | Netherlands | Stockholm, Sweden |
| 19:00 (UTC+1:00) | Swensson 3', 80'; Börjesson 62' (pen.) | Report | Bouvy 26', 47'; Vos 41', 101' | Stadium: Stockholm Olympic Stadium; Attendance: 14,000; Referee: George Simmons (England) |

| 30 June 1912 1912 Summer Olympics Second round | Netherlands | 3–1 | Austria | Stockholm, Sweden |
| | Bouvy 8' ten Cate 12'; Vos 30' | Report | Müller 41' | Stadium: Råsunda IP; Attendance: 7,000; Referee: David Phillips (Scotland) |

| 2 July 1912 1912 Summer Olympics Semi-finals | Denmark | 4–1 | Netherlands | Stockholm, Sweden |
| 19:00 (UTC+1:00) | Olsen 14', 87'; Jørgensen 7'; P. Nielsen 37' | Report | H. Hansen 85' (o.g.) | Stadium: Olympic Stadium; Attendance: 6,000; Referee: Ede Herczog (Hungary) |

| 4 July 1912 1912 Summer Olympics Bronze Medal match | Netherlands | 9-0 | Finland | Solna, Stockholm, Sweden |
| 15:00 | Vos 29', 43', 46', 74', 78' van der Sluis 24', 57' de Groot 28', 86' | Report | | Stadium: Råsunda; Attendance: 1,000; Referee: Per Sjoblom (Sweden) |

| 17 November 1912 Friendly | Germany | 2–3 | Netherlands | Leipzig, Germany |
| 14:30 (UTC+1:00) | Jäger 27', 65' | Report | Francken 15', 74'; Haak 56' | Stadium: Sport ground Attendance: 10,000; Referee: Ede Herczog (Hungary) |

=== 1913 ===
| 9 March 1913 1913 Coupe Vanden Abeele | Belgium | 3–3 | Netherlands | Antwerp, Belgium |
| | De Veen 17', 29'; Nisot 30' | Report | Bosschart 1'; Haak 44'; M. Francken 63' | Stadium: Olympic Stadium; Attendance: 12,000; Referee: Frederick Kirkham (England) |

| 24 March 1913 Friendly | Netherlands | 2 – 1 | England Amateurs | ADO Den Haag Stadium, Netherlands |
| 16:00 (UTC+1:00) | de Groot 4', 56' | Report | Woodward 23' | Stadium: Sportpark Houtrust ground Attendance: 16,000; Referee: Charles Barette |

| 20 April 1913 1913 Rotterdamsch Nieuwsblad Beker | Netherlands | 2–4 | Belgium | Zwolle, Netherlands |
| | Bouvy 35' (pen.); De Groot 55' | Report | Suetens 2'; Musch 20', 40'; Nisot 36' | Stadium: Zwolsche Atletische Club Stadion; Attendance: 12,000; Referee: John Baily (England) |

| 15 November 1913 Friendly | England Amateurs | 2 – 1 | Netherlands | Hull, England |
| | Knight ?' (pen.); Woodward ?' | Report | Boutmy ?' (pen.) | Stadium: Anlaby Road; Attendance: 14,000; Referee: William Nunnerley (Wales) |

=== 1914 ===
| 15 March 1914 1914 Coupe Vanden Abeele | Belgium | 2–4 | Netherlands | Antwerp, Belgium |
| | Brébart 18' (pen.) | Report | Kessler 32', 74'; Westra 63'; J. Francken 80' | Stadium: Olympic Stadium; Attendance: 20,000; Referee: James Schumacher (England) |

| 5 April 1914 Friendly | Netherlands | 4–4 | Germany | Amsterdam, Netherlands |
| 14:30 (UTC+0:20) | Vos 34'; Buitenweg 66', 82'; Lotsij 79' | Report | Queck 49'; Jäger 55'; Harder 66'; Wegele 90' | Stadium: Altes Stadium; Attendance: 22,129; Referee: Jack Howcroft (England) |

| 26 April 1914 1914 Rotterdamsch Nieuwsblad Beker | Netherlands | 4–2 | Belgium | Amsterdam, Netherlands |
| | Buitenweg 15', 81'; Vos 24'; Kessler 62' | Report | Van Cant 37'; Nisot 40' | Stadium: Het Nederlandsche Sportpark; Attendance: 28,282; Referee: John Pearson (England) |

| 17 May 1914 Friendly | Denmark | 4–3 | Netherlands | Copenhagen, Denmark |
| | Buitenweg 11', 34' de Groot 33' | Report | P. Nielsen 20', 63', 69'; S. Nielsen 68' | Stadium: Københavns Idrætspark; Attendance: 13,000; Referee: Jack Howcroft (England) |
Note: Final match before World War I.

=== 1919 ===
| 9 June 1919 Friendly | Netherlands | 3 – 1 | Sweden | Amsterdam, Netherlands |
| 15:30 (UTC+1:20) | Brokmann 82'; Dé Kessler 83'; Gupffert 87' | Report | Carlsson 22' | Stadium: Old Stadion; Attendance: 32,280; Referee: Jack Howcroft (England) |

| 24 August 1919 Friendly | Sweden | 4 – 1 | Netherlands Netherlands | Stockholm, Sweden |
| 14:00 (UTC+1:00) | Carlsson 6', 20', 43'; Svedberg 7' | Report | Buitenweg 31' | Stadium: Stockholm Olympic Stadium; Attendance: 10,000; Referee: Hagbard Vestergaard (Denmark) |

| 31 August 1919 Friendly | Norway | 1–1 | Netherlands | Kristiania, Norway |
| 12:30 (UTC+1) | Engebretsen 67' | Report | Buitenweg 58' | Stadium: Gressbanen; Attendance: 14,000; Referee: Kurt Nilsson (Sweden) |

== See also ==
- Netherlands national football team results
