= Belgium vs Netherlands Cups =

Coupe Vanden Abeele Rotterdamsch Nieuwsblad Beker
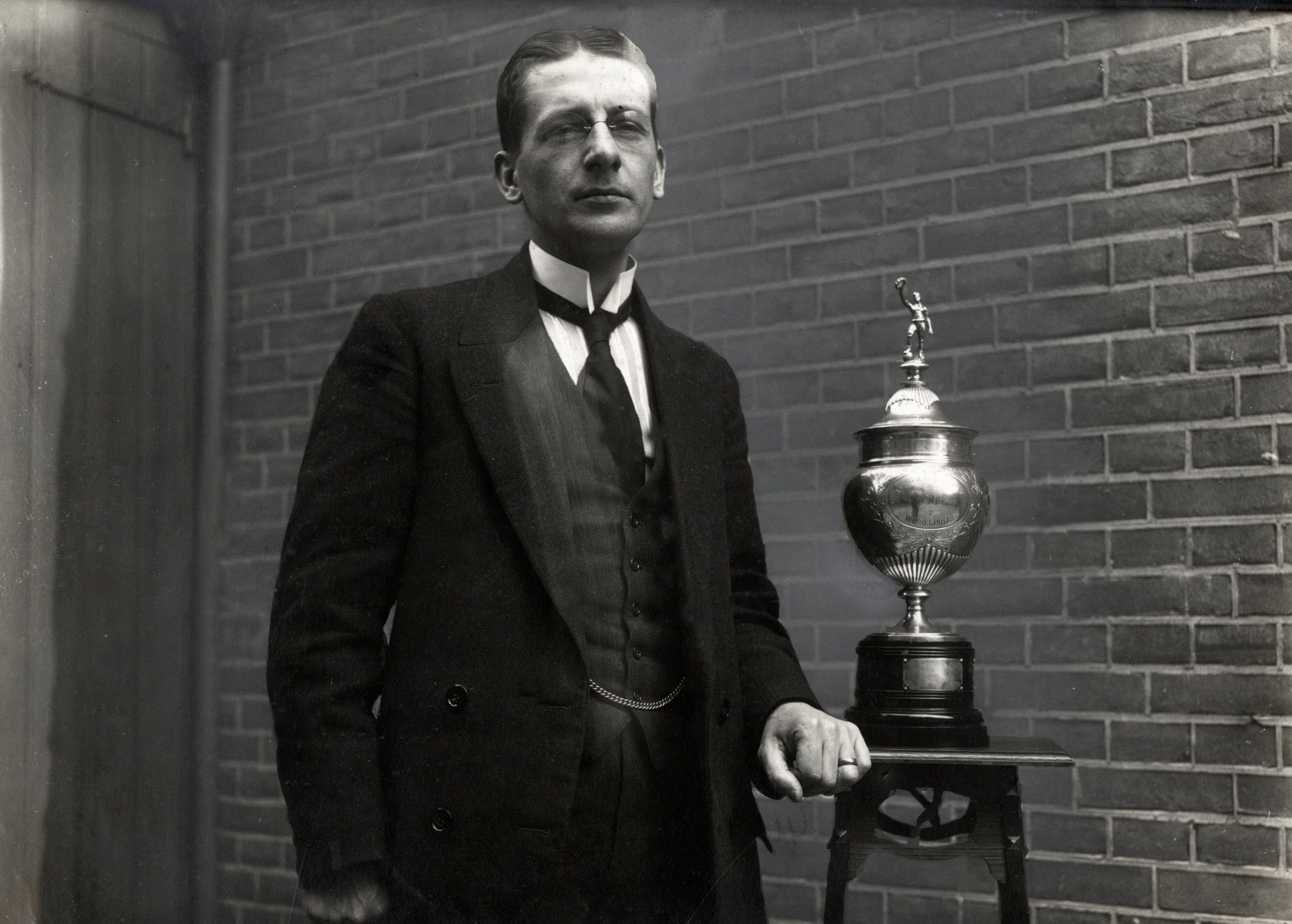
- Hylkema with the Coupe Vanden Abeele (1914)
- Founded: 1904
- Abolished: 1932
- Region: Low Countries (UEFA)
- Teams: 2
- Last champions: Belgium (15th title)
- Most championships: Netherlands (16 titles)

The Belgium vs Netherlands Cups were a series of international football friendly cup matches contested by the national teams of Belgium and the Netherlands. From their first unofficial friendly derbies in the early 1900s, until the mid-1920s, Belgium and the Netherlands competed for floating trophies. During the encounters in Belgium the teams played for the Coupe Vanden Abeele until 1925, while in the Netherlands they faced off for the Rotterdamsch Nieuwsblad Beker until 1923. In total, there has been 39 Belgian-Dutch friendly cup duels, of which 35 were official internationals.

The cup awarded in Belgium was named in honor of the donator of the trophy, Frédéric Vanden Abeele Sr., the father of the secretary of Beerschot Athletic Club (where the first tournament was held), in reaction to Brussels' successful staging of the Coupe Van der Straeten Ponthoz one year earlier. As the Dutch disliked the design of the Belgian trophy, they quickly nicknamed it Het Koperen Dingetje, meaning "The Copper Thingy".

These Belgian-Dutch friendly cups are among the oldest international football cups along with the 1904 Évence Coppée Trophy.

== History ==
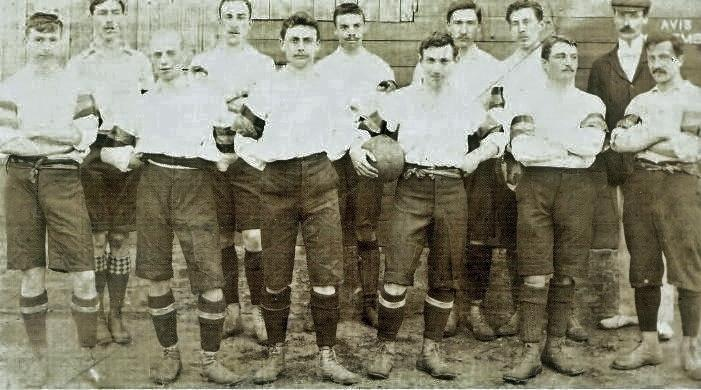
The first Belgium national team, 28 April 1901. Back from left: Henry Menzies, Georges Simon, Fernand Defalle, Hughes Ryan, Gustave Pelgrims, Charles Maggee (referee). Front from left: Herbert Potts, Jan Robyns, Ernest Gillon, Albert Friling (Captain), Lucien Londot, Walter Potts.

After the huge success of the first edition of the Coupe Van der Straeten Ponthoz in 1900, the plans for another international club tournament began, and in February 1901, the "Comité voor den beker-Vanden Abeele" invited a Dutch eleven to travel to Antwerp to contest the Coupe Vanden Abeele (offered by Frédéric Vanden Abeele) against an All-Belgium side during the Easter holiday. However, the Easter weekend was already planned for the second edition of the Coupe Van der Straeten Ponthoz in Brussels, so the match had to be delayed by three weeks, and since many Dutch clubs had league commitments on the new date, the Dutch team fell apart and the match was thus almost canceled. However, the Antwerp football director Frédéric Vanden Abeele personally hired Cees van Hasselt, a former Sparta player and a tailor in Rotterdam who had traveled to Antwerp for this match, to quickly assemble a Dutch team to play the game. The ones who took the initiative to play this match against Belgium were Van Hasselt and his friend Jirris, the captain of Rotterdam club side Celeritas, a club from a third-level competition, and this squad was then strengthened by three players from another Rotterdam club, Olympia, which was also a third-level side. Naturally, the hosts, whose team was announced as an All-Belgium XI and included four Englishmen residing in Belgium, had little trouble claiming the Coupe Vanden Abeele after an 8–0 victory, with the star of the match being the English Herbert Potts, who netted 7 of the Belgian goals. Although the dirigents of this cup only intended to create another international club tournament, they instead had just witnessed what is now considered the first-ever (unofficial) match between Belgium and the Netherlands, held on 28 April 1901 at the ground of Beerschot A.C. in front of just 300 people. This match took place a year earlier than the first official international match played in continental Europe between Austria and Hungary on 12 October 1902.

The next three editions saw the Dutch represented by sides selected and organized by Cees van Hasselt. As a result of the games not being sanctioned by the Royal Dutch Football Association (KNVB), only players from the second division were available to Van Hasselt, so Belgium also won those three editions, although with more leveled scores (1–0, 2–1 and 6–4). Neither team can be considered a full national team since the Netherlands was only represented by players from South Netherlands and also because the match was not yet played under the auspices of the KNVB, while the Belgium squad had the presence of English players in the "Belgian" squad such as center-forward Herbert Potts, who scored 12 of "Belgium's" 17 goals. Likewise, in those games the Netherlands was announced under the name of "Van Hasselt XI", while the hosts were announced as an All-Belgian League XI.

In 1905 the Dutch football federation decided to take direct responsibility for the selection of the Dutch side, and so, on 30 April 1905, the Netherlands national team played their first official international game, beating Belgium 4–1 in Antwerp, courtesy of a four-goal haul from Eddy de Neve, thus winning the Coupe Vanden Abeele for the first time. Belgium was the first ever opponent of the Netherlands, but the opposite can't be said as Belgium's official debut came on 1 May 1904 against France at Évence Coppée Trophy.

== Coupe Vanden Abeele ==
=== Unofficial results (1901–1904) ===
The earliest four games played by a national selection of players active in Belgium, with the Netherlands as opponent between 1901 and 1904, were not yet considered as official because of the presence of English players in the "Belgian" squad.

==== 1901 ====
28 April 1901

Belgium	8–0	Netherlands
H. Potts ?', ?', ?', ?', ?', ?', ?'; W. Potts ?'	Report

Beerschot A.C. ground, Antwerp, Belgium
Attendance: 300
Referee: Charles Maggee

==== 1902 ====
5 January 1902

Belgium	1–0	Netherlands (Van Hasselt XI)
W. Potts	Report

Beerschot A.C. ground, Antwerp, Belgium

==== 1903 ====
The Van Hasselt XI had originally announced to field the Sol brothers (John and Eetje), but they were replaced by Dirk Lotsij and Dolf Heĳning.

15 December 1902

Belgium	2–1	Netherlands (Van Hasselt XI)
Blanchard 1–1'; H. Potts 2–1'	Report	Lotsy 0–1'

Beerschot A.C. ground, Antwerp, Belgium

==== 1904 ====
Belgium had originally announced to field an exclusively Belgian squad, but eventually replaced the injured Paul Chibert with Herbert Potts, who contributed decisively to Belgium's win, scoring four goals.

3 January 1904

Belgium	6–4	Netherlands (Van Hasselt XI)
H. Potts 1–0', 2–1', 4–2', 6–4'; Feye 3–2', 5–4'	Report	Bekker 1–1'; Kamperdijk 2–2'; Van den Berg 3–4'; Wollenberg 4–4'

Beerschot A.C. ground, Antwerp, Belgium
Referee: Herbert Willing (Netherlands)

=== Official results (1905–1925) ===
==== 1905 ====
30 April 1905
14:30 (UTC+0:00)

Belgium	1–4 (a.e.t.)	Netherlands
Stom 86' (o.g.)	Report	de Neve 80', 106', 117', 119'

Beerschot A.C. ground, Antwerp, Belgium
Attendance: 800
Referee: Frank König (Belgium)

==== 1906 ====
29 April 1906
14:30 (UTC+0:00)

Belgium	5–0	Netherlands
Vanden Eynde 15'; Goetinck 40'; De Veen 52', 68', 80'	Report

Beerschot A.C. ground, Antwerp, Belgium
Attendance: 2,000
Referee: Pat Harrower (England)

==== 1907 ====
14 April 1907
14:30 (UTC+0:00)

Belgium	1–3 (a.e.t.)	Netherlands
Feye 13'	Report	Van Gogh 74', 118'; Feith 99'

Beerschot A.C. ground, Antwerp, Belgium
Attendance: 2,500
Referee: Pat Harrower (England)

==== 1908 ====
29 March 1908
14:45 (UTC+0:00)

Belgium	1–4	Netherlands
Vertongen 81'	Report	Ruffelse 12'; Thomée 50', 74'; De Korver 85'

Beerschot A.C. ground, Antwerp, Belgium
Attendance: 2,000
Referee: Pat Harrower (England)

==== 1909 ====
21 March 1909
14:45 (UTC+0:00)

Belgium	1–4	Netherlands
Poelmans 63'	Report	Snethlage 11'; Kessler 19'; Welcker 38'; Lutjens 79'

Beerschot A.C. ground, Antwerp, Belgium
Attendance: 6,000
Referee: Thomas Kyle (England)

==== 1910 ====
13 March 1910
15:00 (UTC+0:00)

Belgium	3–2 (a.e.t.)	Netherlands
De Veen 19', 24'; Six 119'	Report	Lutjens 21'; Kessler 26'

Beerschot A.C. ground, Antwerp, Belgium
Attendance: 8,500
Referee: James Schumacher (England)

Note: After this match, it was decided that draws would not be followed by extra time anymore; so in case of a draw after 90 minutes, the holders retained the cup.

==== 1911 ====
19 March 1911
15:00 (UTC+0:00)

Belgium	1–5	Netherlands
Paternoster 78'	Report	M. Francken 8', 36', 55'; Thomée 83'; Welcker 88'

Beerschot A.C. ground, Antwerp, Belgium
Attendance: 12,000
Referee: Thomas Campbell (England)

==== 1912 ====
10 March 1912
14:30 (UTC+0:00)

Belgium	1–2	Netherlands
Nisot 60'	Report	Thomée 58', 72'

Beerschot A.C. ground, Antwerp, Belgium
Attendance: 9,225
Referee: Charles Crisp (England)

==== 1913 ====
9 March 1913
14:30 (UTC+0:00)

Belgium	3–3	Netherlands
De Veen 17', 29'; Nisot 30'	Report	Bosschart 1'; Haak 44'; M. Francken 63'

Beerschot A.C. ground, Antwerp, Belgium
Attendance: 12,000
Referee: Frederick Kirkham (England)

==== 1914 ====
15 March 1914
14:30 (UTC+0:00)

Belgium	2–4	Netherlands
Brébart 18' (pen.)	Report	Kessler 32', 74'; Westra 63'; J. Francken 80'

Beerschot A.C. ground, Antwerp, Belgium
Attendance: 20,000
Referee: James Schumacher (England)

Note: Belgium and Netherlands faced each other on 31 August 1920 and on 15 May 1921, but the trophy was not on offer in either match because the first was an Olympic semifinal and the second was held in celebration of the silver jubilee of the Belgian FA); thus, they are not part of the series.

==== 1922 ====
26 March 1922
15:00 (UTC+1:00)

Belgium	4–0	Netherlands
Larnoe 14', 86'; Vandevelde 37'; Coppée 47'	Report

Olympic Stadium, Antwerp, Belgium
Attendance: 40,000
Referee: Claud Newman (England)

==== 1924 ====
27 April 1924
15:00 (UTC+1:00)

Belgium	1–1	Netherlands
Thys 78'	Report	Visser 74'

Olympic Stadium, Antwerp, Belgium
Attendance: 30,000
Referee: Harry Kingscott (England)

Note: The 1–1 draw meant that the holders Belgium retained the cup, but at the post-match banquet, Joseph d'Oultremont, the president of the Belgian FA, handed the trophy to Dutch captain Harry Dénis in recognition of the Dutch performance in the match.

==== 1925 ====
15 March 1925
15:00 (UTC+1:00)

Belgium	0–1	Netherlands
	Report	van Baar van Slangenburgh 64'

Olympic Stadium, Antwerp, Belgium
Attendance: 30,000
Referee: Harry Kingscott (England)

Note: The last Coupe Vanden Abeele match was also the first in which the hosts failed to score.

=== Coupe Vanden Abeele statistics ===
==== Record ====
Team	Pld	W	D	L	GF	GA	Dif
Belgium	14	3	3	8	25	34	-9
Netherlands	14	8	3	3	34	25	+9

==== All-time top scorers ====
Rank	Name	Team	Goals	Tournament(s)
1	(Belgium) Robert De Veen	Belgium	7	1906 (3), 1910 (2) and 1913 (2)
2	(Netherlands) Jan Thomée	Netherlands	5	1908 (2), 1911 (1) and 1912 (2)
2	(Netherlands) Mannes Francken	Netherlands	5	1911 (3) and 1913 (1)
4	(Netherlands) Eddy de Neve	Netherlands	4	1905 (4)
4	(Netherlands) Dé Kessler	Netherlands	4	1910 (1), 1914 (2) and 1921 (1)

== Rotterdamsch Nieuwsblad Beker ==
=== Official results (1905–1923) ===
==== 1905 ====
14 May 1905
14:00 (UTC+0:20)

Netherlands	4–0	Belgium
Hesselink 74' de Neve 76' (pen.), 84'; Lutjens 80'	Report

Schuttersveld ground, Rotterdam, Netherlands
Attendance: 30,000
Referee: Henry Vermeulen (Netherlands)

==== 1906 ====
13 May 1906
14:00 (UTC+0:20)

Netherlands	2–3	Belgium
Muller 32'; Van der Vinne 54'	Report	Cambier 76', 88'; Destrebecq 81'

Schuttersveld, Rotterdam, Netherlands
Attendance: 7,000
Referee: Frank König (Belgium)

==== 1907 ====
9 May 1907
14:00 (UTC+0:20)

Netherlands	1–2	Belgium
Feith 54'	Report	Feye 14'; Goetinck 60'

De Hout, Haarlem, Netherlands
Attendance: 10,000
Referee: Ernest Holland (England)

==== 1908 ====
26 April 1908
14:00 (UTC+0:20)

Netherlands	3–1	Belgium
Snethlage 17'; Thomée 31' (pen.), 60' (pen.)	Report	Saeys 90'

Prinsenlaan, Rotterdam, Netherlands
Attendance: 6,000
Referee: Jack Howcroft (England)

==== 1909 ====
25 April 1909
14:30 (UTC+0:20)

Netherlands	4–1	Belgium
Lutjens 2'; Snethlage 21', 32', 54'	Report	Goossens 58'

Prinsenlaan, Rotterdam, Netherlands
Attendance: 10,000
Referee: Jack Howcroft (England)

==== 1910 ====
10 April 1910
14:30 (UTC+0:20)

Netherlands	7–0	Belgium
Welcker 10', 28'; M. Francken 15', 45', 62'; Thomée 55', 80'	Report

De Hout, Haarlem, Netherlands
Referee: John Howcroft (England)

==== 1911 ====
2 April 1911
14:30 (UTC+0:20)

Netherlands	3–1	Belgium
M. Francken 28', 76' van Breda Kolff 29'	Report	Six 36'

D.F.C.-terrein aan de Markettenweg, Dordrecht, Netherlands
Attendance: 9,000
Referee: George Miller (England)

==== 1912 ====
28 April 1912
14:30 (UTC+0:20)

Netherlands	4–3	Belgium
van Berckel 1'; M. Francken 2', 20', 62'	Report	Musch 27'; Nisot 43', 56'

D.F.C.-terrein aan de Markettenweg, Dordrecht, Netherlands
Attendance: 10,000
Referee: John Pearson (England)

==== 1913 ====
20 April 1913
14:30 (UTC+0:20)

Netherlands	2–4	Belgium
Bouvy 35' (pen.) de Groot 55'	Report	Suetens 2'; Musch 20', 40'; Nisot 36'

Zwolsche Atletische Club Stadion, Zwolle, Netherlands
Attendance: 12,000
Referee: John Baily (England)

==== 1914 ====
26 April 1914
14:30 (UTC+0:20)

Netherlands	4–2	Belgium
Buitenweg 15', 81'; Vos 24'; Kessler 62'	Report	Van Cant 37'; Nisot 40'

Het Nederlandsche Sportpark, Amsterdam, Netherlands
Attendance: 28,282
Referee: John Pearson (England)

==== 1922 ====
7 May 1922
14:30 (UTC+1:20)

Netherlands	1–2	Belgium
Bulder 88'	Report	Dénis 8' (o.g.); Michel 42'

Het Nederlandsche Sportpark, Amsterdam, Netherlands
Attendance: 29,730
Referee: Louis Fourgous (France)

==== 1923 ====
29 April 1923
14:30 (UTC+1:20)

Netherlands	1–1	Belgium
Heijnen 68'	Report	Thys 34'

Het Nederlandsche Sportpark, Amsterdam, Netherlands
Attendance: 30,000
Referee: Ernst Albihn (Sweden)

=== Rotterdamsch Nieuwsblad Beker statistics ===
==== Record ====
Team	Pld	W	D	L	GF	GA	Dif
Belgium	21	5	5	11	35	55	-20
Netherlands	21	11	5	5	55	35	+20

==== All-time top scorers ====
Rank	Name	Team	Goals	Tournament(s)
1	(Netherlands) Mannes Francken	Netherlands	8	1910 (3), 1911 (2) and 1912 (3)
2	(Netherlands) Edu Snethlage	Netherlands	4	1908 (1) and 1909 (3)
2	(Netherlands) Jan Thomée	Netherlands	4	1908 (2) and 1910 (2)
2	(Belgium) Fernand Nisot	Belgium	4	1912 (1), 1913 (2) and 1914 (1)
5	(Belgium) Joseph Musch	Belgium	3	1912 (1) and 1913 (2)

== General statistics ==
=== Overall record ===
Belgium-Netherlands Cup Record
Competition	Played	Results			Goals	
Competition	Played	Belgium	Draw	Netherlands	Belgium	Netherlands
(Belgium) 1905–25 Coupe Vanden Abeele	14	3*	3	8	25	34
(Netherlands) 1905–23 Rotterdamsch Nieuwsblad Beker	21	5	5	11	35	55
Total	35	8*	8	19	60	89
* Excluding the four trophies between 1901 and 1904 won by a 'Belgian' selection, as these matches are unofficial.

=== General all-time top scorers ===
Rank	Name	Team	Goals	Tournament(s)
1	(Netherlands) Mannes Francken	Netherlands	12	CVA (4) and RNB (8)
	(England) Herbert Potts	Belgium	12	CVA (12)
2	(Netherlands) Jan Thomée	Netherlands	9	CVA (5) and RNB (4)
3	(Belgium) Robert De Veen	Belgium	7	CVA (7)
4	(Netherlands) Eddy de Neve	Netherlands	6	CVA (4) and RNB (2)
4	(Belgium) Fernand Nisot	Belgium	6	CVA (2) and RNB (4)
6	(Netherlands) Dé Kessler	Netherlands	5	CVA (4) and RNB (1)
6	(Netherlands) Edu Snethlage	Netherlands	5	CVA (1) and RNB (4)

=== Hat-tricks ===
Since the first official tournament in 1905, a total of 6 hat-tricks have been scored in the 35 official cups. The first hat-trick was scored by Eddy de Neve of Netherlands, scoring 4 goals in a 4-1 win at the Coupe Vanden Abeele on 30 April 1905; and the last was by Mannes Francken, netting three goals also for the Netherlands in a 4-3 win at the Rotterdamsch Nieuwsblad Beker on 28 April 1912. The record for the most goals scored in a single match is 4, which has been achieved on just one occasion: by the Dutch Eddy de Neve at the 1904 Coupe Vanden Abeele, with three of his goals coming in extra-time. However, if we also include the unofficial matches, then the record is held by the Englishmen Herbert Potts of Belgium, who netted a whopping seven goals in an 8-0 win at the 1901 Coupe Vanden Abeele. Mannes Francken is the only player to have scored three hat-tricks in these friendly duels, two at RNBs (1910 and 1912) and one at the CVA (1911), which is a remarkable achievement since no one else has even scored two, sept for Herbert Potts if the unofficial games are considered. The Netherlands holds the record for most hat-tricks scored with 5, while Belgium only has 1, which was scored by Robert De Veen. On the other hand, the cups are perfectly balanced on hat-tricks, with each having three.

==== List ====
Belgium vs Netherlands Cup hat-tricks
#	Player	G	Time of goals	For	Result	Against	Tournament	Date	FIFA report
.	Herbert Potts	7	?', ?', ?', ?', ?', ?', ?'	Belgium	8–0	Netherlands	1901 Coupe Vanden Abeele	28 April 1901	
.	Herbert Potts (2)	4	?', ?', ?', ?'	Belgium	6–4	Netherlands	1904 Coupe Vanden Abeele	3 January 1904	
1.	Eddy de Neve	4	80', 106', 117', 119'	Netherlands	4–1	Belgium	1905 Coupe Vanden Abeele	30 April 1905	
2.	Robert De Veen	3	52', 68', 80'	Belgium	7–1	Netherlands	1906 Coupe Vanden Abeele	29 April 1906	
3.	Edu Snethlage	3	21', 32', 54'	Netherlands	4–1	Belgium	1909 Rotterdamsch Nieuwsblad Beker	25 April 1909	
4.	Mannes Francken	3	15', 45', 62'	Netherlands	7–0	Belgium	1910 Rotterdamsch Nieuwsblad Beker	10 April 1910	
5.	Mannes Francken (2)	3	8', 36', 55'	Netherlands	5–1	Belgium	1911 Coupe Vanden Abeele	19 March 1911	
6.	Mannes Francken (3)	3	2', 20', 62'	Netherlands	4–3	Belgium	1912 Rotterdamsch Nieuwsblad Beker	28 April 1912	

== See also ==
- Belgium national football team results (unofficial matches)
- Netherlands national football team results (unofficial matches)
- Belgium national football team results (1904–1919)
- Netherlands national football team results (1905–1919)
