= List of Belgium national football team hat-tricks =

Romelu Lukaku holds the record for the most hat-tricks scored for Belgium, with four in total.

Since the inception of international association football matches, 28 Belgium male footballers have scored three or more goals (a hat-trick) in a game. The first player to score a hat-trick for Belgium was Pierre-Joseph Destrebecq, while on the books of Union Saint-Gilloise, in a friendly match against France in 1905. Three players, Robert De Veen, Bert De Cleyn and Josip Weber, have scored five goals in one match. Romelu Lukaku has scored the greatest number of hat-tricks for Belgium, with four.

Belgium have conceded 44 hat-tricks since 1904, the most recent being scored by Haris Seferovic in a 2–5 UEFA Nations League loss against Switzerland. Undoubtedly, the most famous hat-trick against Belgium came during the 1986 FIFA World Cup, when Belgium overcame three goals by Igor Belanov to move past the Soviet Union into the quarter-finals.

== Hat-tricks for Belgium ==
Date	Goals	Player	Opponent	Venue	Competition	Result^{[a]}	Ref.
7 May 1905	3	Pierre-Joseph Destrebecq	France	Stade du Vivier d'Oie, Brussels	Friendly	7–0	
29 April 1906	3	Robert De Veen	Netherlands	Beerschot Stadion, Antwerp	Friendly	5–0	
9 May 1909	3	Robert De Veen	France	Stade du Vivier d'Oie, Brussels	Friendly	5–2	
3 April 1910	3	Alphonse Six	France	Stade de la FGSPF, Gentilly	Friendly	4–0	
30 April 1911	5	Robert De Veen	France	Rue de Forest, Brussels	Friendly	7–1	
20 February 1912	3	Louis Saeys	Switzerland	Stadion Broodstraat, Antwerp	Friendly	9–2	
23 November 1913	3	Sylvain Brébart	Germany	Stadion Broodstraat, Antwerp	Friendly	6–2	
23 November 1913	3	Jean Van Cant	Germany	Stadion Broodstraat, Antwerp	Friendly	6–2	
29 August 1920	3	Robert Coppée	Spain	Olympisch Stadion, Antwerp	1920 Summer Olympics	3–1	
13 April 1930	3	Michel Vanderbauwhede	France	Stade Olympique Yves-du-Manoir, Colombes	Friendly	6–1	
5 June 1932	3	Jean Capelle	Denmark	Idrætsparken, Copenhagen	Friendly	4–3	
19 March 1939	3	Jean Capelle	Netherlands	Bosuilstadion, Antwerp	Friendly	5–4	
17 March 1940	3	Jules Van Craen	Netherlands	Bosuilstadion, Antwerp	Friendly	7–1	
23 February 1946	5	Bert De Cleyn	Luxembourg	Stade du Mambourg, Charleroi	Friendly	7–0	
10 May 1950	3	Joseph Mermans	Republic of Ireland	Heysel Stadium, Brussels	Friendly	5–1	
4 June 1950	3	Joseph Mermans	France	Heysel Stadium, Brussels	Friendly	4–1	
12 November 1950	3	Victor Lemberechts	Netherlands	Bosuilstadion, Antwerp	Friendly	7–2	
25 November 1951	3	Pol Anoul	Netherlands	Stadion De Kuip, Rotterdam	Friendly	7–6	
25 May 1953	3	Rik Coppens	Finland	Helsinki Olympic Stadium, Helsinki	1954 FIFA World Cup qualification	4–2	
4 September 1957	3	Paul Vandenberg	Iceland	Laugardalsvöllur, Reykjavík	1958 FIFA World Cup qualification	5–2	
24 April 1963	3	Jacques Stockman	Brazil	Heysel Stadium, Brussels	Friendly	5–1	
10 November 1965	3	Paul Van Himst	Israel	Ramat Gan Stadium, Ramat Gan	1966 FIFA World Cup qualification	5–0	
19 March 1967	3	Jacques Stockman	Luxembourg	Stade Municipal, Luxembourg	UEFA Euro 1968 qualifying	5–0	
9 October 1968	3	Lon Polleunis	Finland	Regenboogstadion, Waregem	1970 FIFA World Cup qualification	6–1	
18 May 1972	3	Lon Polleunis	Iceland	Stade de Sclessin, Liège	1974 FIFA World Cup qualification	6–1	
14 October 1986	3	Nico Claesen	Luxembourg	Stade Municipal, Luxembourg	UEFA Euro 1988 qualifying	6–0	
1 April 1987	3	Nico Claesen	Scotland	Constant Vanden Stock Stadium, Anderlecht	UEFA Euro 1988 qualifying	4–1	
1 June 1989	4	Marc Van Der Linden	Luxembourg	Stade Grimonprez-Jooris, Lille (France)	1990 FIFA World Cup qualification	5–0	
4 June 1994	5	Josip Weber	Zambia	Heysel Stadium, Brussels	Friendly	9–0	
4 June 1994	3	Marc Degryse	Zambia	Heysel Stadium, Brussels	Friendly	9–0	
30 April 1997	3	Luís Oliveira	Turkey	Ali Sami Yen Stadium, Istanbul	1998 FIFA World Cup qualification	3–1	
28 February 2001	3	Bob Peeters	San Marino	King Baudouin Stadium, Brussels	2002 FIFA World Cup qualification	10–1	
26 May 2014	3	Romelu Lukaku	Luxembourg	Cristal Arena, Genk	Friendly	5–1	
10 October 2016	3	Christian Benteke	Gibraltar	Estádio Algarve, Faro/Loulé	2018 FIFA World Cup qualification	6–0	
31 August 2017	3	Thomas Meunier	Gibraltar	Stade Maurice Dufrasne, Liège	2018 FIFA World Cup qualification	9–0	
31 August 2017	3	Romelu Lukaku	Gibraltar	Stade Maurice Dufrasne, Liège	2018 FIFA World Cup qualification	9–0	
24 March 2023	3	Romelu Lukaku	Sweden	Friends Arena, Solna	UEFA Euro 2024 qualifying	3–0	
19 November 2023	4	Romelu Lukaku	Azerbaijan	King Baudouin Stadium, Brussels	UEFA Euro 2024 qualifying	5–0	

Note

1. Lukaku hat-trick goals against Luxembourg on 26 May 2014 were counted by RBFA but not officially recognised by FIFA due to an excessive number of substitutions according to the Laws of the Game.

== Hat-tricks conceded by Belgium ==
Belgium have conceded 44 hat-tricks.

Date	Goals	Player	Opponent	Venue	Competition	Result^{[a]}	Ref.
30 April 1905	3	Eddy de Neve	Netherlands	Beerschot Stadion, Antwerp	Friendly	1–4	
18 April 1908	3	Vivian Woodward	England Amateurs	Vélodrome de Longchamps, Brussels	Friendly	2–8	
17 April 1909	4	Cyril Dunning	England Amateurs	White Hart Lane, Tottenham	Friendly	2–11	
17 April 1909	3	Harold Stapley	England Amateurs	White Hart Lane, Tottenham	Friendly	2–11	
25 April 1909	3	Edu Snethlage	Netherlands	Prinsenlaan, Rotterdam	Friendly	1–4	
10 April 1910	3	Mannes Francken	Netherlands	De Hout, Haarlem	Friendly	0–7	
19 March 1911	3	Mannes Francken	Netherlands	Beerschot Stadion, Antwerp	Friendly	1–5	
28 April 1912	3	Mannes Francken	Netherlands	DFC-terrein aan de Markettenweg, Dordrecht	Friendly	3–4	
24 February 1914	3	Lionel Louch	England Amateurs	Vélodrome de Longchamps, Brussels	Friendly	1–8	
25 May 1924	3	Rudolf Kock	Sweden	Stade Olympique Yves-du-Manoir, Colombes (France)	1924 Summer Olympics	1–8	
25 May 1924	3	Sven Rydell	Sweden	Stade Olympique Yves-du-Manoir, Colombes (France)	1924 Summer Olympics	1–8	
3 May 1925	3	Wout Buitenweg	Netherlands	Het Nederlandsche Sportpark, Amsterdam	Friendly	0–5	
24 May 1926	3	Frank Osborne	England	Olympisch Stadion, Antwerp	Friendly	3–5	
11 May 1927	3	Dixie Dean	England	Stadium in Molenbeek, Molenbeek	Friendly	1–9	
2 June 1928	3	Domingo Tarasconi	Argentina	Olympic Stadium, Amsterdam (Netherlands)	1928 Summer Olympics	3–6	
20 April 1929	3	John Flood	Irish Free State	Dalymount Park, Dublin	Friendly	0–4	
11 May 1929	3	George Camsell	England	Parc Duden, Brussels	Friendly	1–5	
20 March 1932	4	Wim Lagendaal	Netherlands	Bosuilstadion, Antwerp	Friendly	1–4	
11 December 1932	4	Anton Schall	Austria	Jubelstadion, Brussels	Friendly	1–6	
22 October 1933	4	Karl Hohmann	Germany	Wedaustadion, Duisburg	Friendly	1–8	
25 February 1934	4	Paddy Moore	Irish Free State	Dalymount Park, Dublin	1934 FIFA World Cup qualification	4–4	
11 March 1934	5	Leen Vente	Netherlands	Olympic Stadium, Amsterdam	Friendly	3–9	
27 May 1934	3	Edmund Conen	Germany	Stadio Giovanni Berta, Florence (Italy)	1934 FIFA World Cup	2–5	
31 March 1935	3	Beb Bakhuys	Netherlands	Olympic Stadium, Amsterdam	Friendly	2–4	
29 March 1936	3	Beb Bakhuys	Netherlands	Olympic Stadium, Amsterdam	Friendly	0–8	
27 February 1938	4	Kick Smit	Netherlands	Stadion De Kuip, Rotterdam	Friendly	2–7	
15 May 1938	3	Silvio Piola	Italy	San Siro, Milan	Friendly	1–6	
12 May 1946	3	Faas Wilkes	Netherlands	Olympic Stadium, Amsterdam	Friendly	3–6	
23 November 1949	3	Trevor Ford	Wales	Ninian Park, Cardiff	Friendly	1–5	
15 April 1951	3	Noud van Melis	Netherlands	Olympic Stadium, Amsterdam	Friendly	4–5	
20 May 1951	3	George Hamilton	Scotland	Heysel Stadium, Brussels	Friendly	0–5	
25 November 1951	3	Abe Lenstra	Netherlands	Stadion De Kuip, Rotterdam	Friendly	7–6	
11 November 1956	5	Thadée Cisowski	France	Heysel Stadium, Brussels	1958 FIFA World Cup qualification	3–6	
4 October 1959	3	Faas Wilkes	Netherlands	Stadion De Kuip, Rotterdam	Friendly	1–9	
4 October 1959	3	Piet van der Kuil	Netherlands	Stadion De Kuip, Rotterdam	Friendly	1–9	
20 November 1960	3	Charles Antenen	Switzerland	Heysel Stadium, Brussels	1962 FIFA World Cup qualification	2–4	
2 June 1965	3	Pelé	Brazil	Estádio do Maracanã, Rio de Janeiro	Friendly	0–5	
8 October 1967	3	Janusz Żmijewski	Poland	Heysel Stadium, Brussels	UEFA Euro 1968 qualifying	2–4	
25 April 1976	3	Rob Rensenbrink	Netherlands	Stadion De Kuip, Rotterdam	UEFA Euro 1976 qualifying	0–5	
28 June 1982	3	Zbigniew Boniek	Poland	Camp Nou, Barcelona (Spain)	1982 FIFA World Cup	0–3	
16 June 1984	3	Michel Platini	France	Stade de la Beaujoire, Nantes	UEFA Euro 1984	0–5	
15 June 1986	3	Igor Belanov	Soviet Union	Estadio Nou Camp León, León (Mexico)	1986 FIFA World Cup	4–3	
4 September 1999	3	Patrick Kluivert	Netherlands	Stadion De Kuip, Rotterdam	Friendly	5–5	
18 November 2018	3	Haris Seferovic	Switzerland	Swissporarena, Lucerne	2018–19 UEFA Nations League	2–5	

== Notes ==
^{a} The result is presented with Belgium's score first.
