= List of Netherlands national football team hat-tricks =

This is a list of hat-tricks scored in matches involving the Netherlands national football team.

== Hat-tricks for the Netherlands ==
Date	Goals	Player	Opponent	Venue	Competition	Result	Ref
30 April 1905	4	Eddy de Neve	Belgium	Stadion Broodstraat, Antwerp	Friendly	4–1	
25 April 1909	3	Edu Snethlage	Belgium	Schuttersveld, Rotterdam	Friendly	4–1	
10 April 1910	3	Mannes Francken	Belgium	Haarlem Stadion, Haarlem	Friendly	7–0	
19 March 1911	3	Mannes Francken	Belgium	Stadion Broodstraat, Antwerp	Friendly	5–1	
28 April 1912	3	Mannes Francken	Belgium	De Krommedijk, Dordrecht	Friendly	4–3	
4 July 1912	5	Jan Vos	Finland	Råsunda, Stockholm	1912 Olympic Games	9–0	
13 November 1921	3	Jan van Gendt	France	Stade Pershing, Vincennes	Friendly	5–0	
27 May 1924	4	Kees Pijl	Romania	Colombes, Paris	1924 Olympic Games	6–0	
3 May 1925	3	Wout Buitenweg	Belgium	Sportpark, Amsterdam	Friendly	5–0	
29 November 1931	3	Wim Lagendaal	France	Colombes, Paris	Friendly	4–3	
20 March 1932	4	Wim Lagendaal	Belgium	Bosuilstadion, Antwerp	Friendly	4–1	
11 March 1933	5	Leen Vente	Belgium	Olympic Stadium, Amsterdam	Friendly	9–3	
31 March 1935	3	Beb Bakhuys	Belgium	Olympic Stadium, Amsterdam	Friendly	4–2	
12 January 1936	3	Beb Bakhuys	France	Parc des Princes, Paris	Friendly	6–1	
29 March 1936	3	Beb Bakhuys	Belgium	Olympic Stadium, Amsterdam	Friendly	8–0	
28 November 1937	3	Piet de Boer	Luxembourg	De Kuip, Rotterdam	1938 World Cup qualifying	4–0	
27 February 1938	4	Kick Smit	Belgium	De Kuip, Rotterdam	Friendly	7–2	
10 March 1946	4	Faas Wilkes	Luxembourg	Stade Municipal, Luxembourg City	Friendly	6–2	
12 May 1946	3	Faas Wilkes	Belgium	Olympic Stadium, Amsterdam	Friendly	6–3	
23 April 1949	3	Theo Timmermans	France	De Kuip, Rotterdam	Friendly	4–1	
15 April 1951	3	Noud van Melis	Belgium	Olympic Stadium, Amsterdam	Friendly	5–4	
27 October 1951	3	Noud van Melis	Finland	De Kuip, Rotterdam	Friendly	4–4	
25 November 1951	3	Abe Lenstra	Belgium	De Kuip, Rotterdam	Friendly	6–7	
4 October 1959	3	Faas Wilkes	Belgium	De Kuip, Rotterdam	Friendly	9–1	
4 October 1959	3	Piet van der Kuil	Belgium	De Kuip, Rotterdam	Friendly	9–1	
4 November 1959	3	Tonny van der Linden	Norway	De Kuip, Rotterdam	Friendly	7–1	
3 April 1960	3	Tonny van der Linden	Bulgaria	Olympic Stadium, Amsterdam	Friendly	4–2	
3 July 1960	3	Piet Kruiver	(Suriname (Kingdom of the Netherlands)) Suriname	Paramaribo	Friendly	4–3	
5 September 1962	3	Henk Groot	Netherlands Antilles	Amsterdam	Friendly	8–0	
17 November 1971	3	Johan Cruyff	Luxembourg	Philips Stadion, Eindhoven	1972 European Championships qualifying	8–0	
1 November 1972	3	Johan Neeskens	Norway	De Kuip, Rotterdam	1974 World Cup qualifying	9–0	
3 September 1975	3	Willy van der Kuijlen	Finland	Goffertstadion, Nijmegen	1976 European Championships qualifying	4–1	
25 April 1976	3	Rob Rensenbrink	Belgium	De Kuip, Rotterdam	1976 European Championships quarter-final	5–0	
3 June 1978	3	Rob Rensenbrink	Iran	Estadio Ciudad de Mendoza, Mendoza	1978 World Cup	3–0	
9 December 1987	3	John Bosman	Cyprus	De Meer Stadion, Amsterdam	1988 European Championships qualifying	4–0	
15 June 1988	3	Marco van Basten	England	Rheinstadion, Düsseldorf	1988 European Championships	3–1	
19 December 1990	5	Marco van Basten	Malta	Ta'Qali Stadium, Ta'Qali	1992 European Championships qualifying	8–0	
22 September 1993	3	John Bosman	San Marino	Stadio Renato Dall'Ara, Bologna	1994 World Cup qualifying	7–0	
11 October 1995	3	Marc Overmars	Malta	Ta'Qali Stadium, Ta'Qali	1996 European Championships qualifying	4–0	
9 November 1996	3	Dennis Bergkamp	Wales	Philips Stadion, Eindhoven	1998 World Cup qualifying	7–1	
4 September 1999	3	Patrick Kluivert	Belgium	De Kuip, Rotterdam	Friendly	5–5	
25 June 2000	3	Patrick Kluivert	(Serbia and Montenegro) Yugoslavia	De Kuip, Rotterdam	2000 European Championships	6–1	
19 November 2003	3	Ruud van Nistelrooy	Scotland	Amsterdam ArenA, Amsterdam	2004 European Championships qualifying play-off	6–0	
3 September 2010	3	Klaas-Jan Huntelaar	San Marino	San Marino Stadium, Serravalle	2012 European Championships qualifying	5–0	
2 September 2011	4	Robin van Persie	San Marino	Philips Stadion, Eindhoven	2012 European Championships qualifying	11–0	
11 October 2013	3	Robin van Persie	Hungary	Amsterdam ArenA, Amsterdam	2014 World Cup qualifying	8–1	
19 November 2019	3	Georginio Wijnaldum	Estonia	Johan Cruyff Arena, Amsterdam	2020 European Championships qualifying	5–0	
7 September 2021	3	Memphis Depay	Turkey	Johan Cruyff Arena, Amsterdam	2022 World Cup qualifying	6–1	
21 November 2023	3	Calvin Stengs	Gibraltar	Estádio Algarve, Faro	2024 European Championships qualifying	6–0	
13 November 2026	3	Tijjani Reijnders	Greece	Johan Cruyff Arena, Amsterdam	2026–27 UEFA Nations League A	7–0	

== Hat-tricks conceded by the Netherlands ==
Date	Goals	Player	Opponent	Venue	Competition	Result	Ref
29 April 1906	3	Robert De Veen	Belgium	Beerschot Stadion, Antwerp	Friendly	0–5	
24 March 1912	4	Julius Hirsch	Germany	Z.A.C. Stadium, Zwolle	Friendly	5–5	
17 May 1914	3	Poul Nielsen	Denmark	Idrætsparken, Copenhagen	Friendly	3–4	
24 August 1919	3	Herbert Carlsson	Sweden	Olympic Stadium, Stockholm	Friendly	1–4	
19 November 1922	3	Max Abegglen	Switzerland	Spitalacker, Bern	Friendly	0–5	
18 April 1926	3	Josef Pöttinger	Germany	Rheinstadion, Düsseldorf	Friendly	2–4	
13 June 1926	3	Viggo Jørgensen	Denmark	Copenhagen	Friendly	1–4	
9 June 1929	3	Sven Rydell	Sweden	Olympic Stadium, Stockholm	Friendly	2–6	
12 June 1929	3	Jørgen Juve	Norway	Ullevaal Stadion, Oslo	Friendly	4–4	
8 June 1930	3	István Avar	Hungary	Népstadion, Budapest	Friendly	2–6	
2 November 1930	3	André Abegglen	Switzerland	Letzigrund, Zürich	Friendly	3–6	
10 May 1934	3	Jean Nicolas	France	Olympic Stadium, Amsterdam	Friendly	4–5	
19 March 1939	3	Jean Capelle	Belgium	Bosuilstadion, Antwerp	Friendly	4–5	
17 March 1940	3	Jules Van Craen	Belgium	Bosuilstadion, Antwerp	Friendly	1–7	
27 November 1946	4	Tommy Lawton	England	Leeds Road, Huddersfield	Friendly	2–8	
15 October 1950	3	Jacky Fatton	Switzerland	Rankhof Stadium, Basle	Friendly	5–7	
12 November 1950	3	Victor Lemberechts	Belgium	Bosuilstadion, Antwerp	Friendly	2–7	
25 November 1951	3	Pol Anoul	Belgium	Stadion De Kuip, Rotterdam	Friendly	6–7	
30 May 1954	3	Roger Vonlanthen	Switzerland	Hardturm, Zürich	Friendly	1–3	
30 January 1957	3	Alfredo di Stéfano	Spain	Santiago Bernabéu, Madrid	Friendly	1–5	
21 October 1959	3	Uwe Seeler	West Germany	Müngersdorfer Stadion, Cologne	Friendly	0–7	
30 October 1960	3	Adolf Scherer	Czechoslovakia	Prague	Friendly	0–4	
5 April 1967	3	Henning Frenzel	East Germany	Stadion der Hunderttausend, Leipzig	1968 European Championships qualifying	3–4	
14 June 1980	3	Klaus Allofs	West Germany	Stadio San Paolo, Naples	1980 European Championships	2–3	
24 March 2021	3	Burak Yılmaz	Turkey	Atatürk Olympic Stadium, Istanbul	2022 World Cup qualifying	2–4	
