= Dirk Lotsij =

Dutch footballer

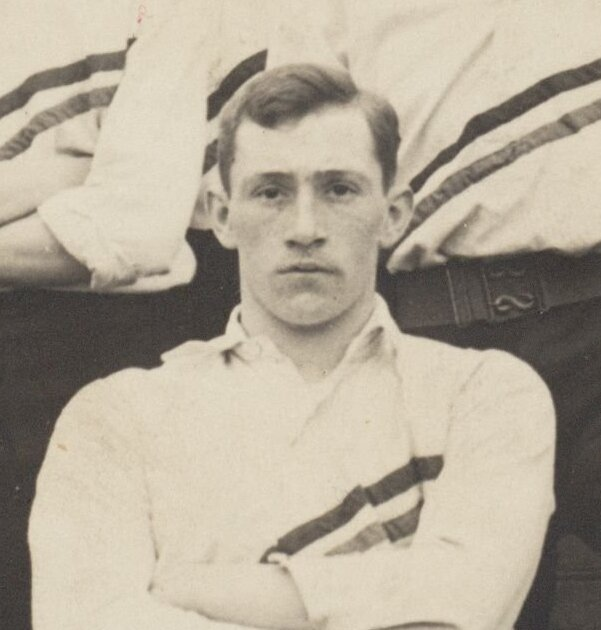
- Dirk Lotsij (1905)

Personal information
- Full name: Dirk Nicolaas Lotsij
- Date of birth: 3 July 1882
- Place of birth: Dordrecht, Netherlands
- Date of death: 27 March 1965 (aged 82)
- Place of death: The Hague, Netherlands
- Position: Midfielder

Senior career*
Years	Team	Apps	(Gls)
1901-1914	FC Dordrecht		

International career
1902	Netherlands ("Van Hasselt XI")	1	(1)
1905–1914	Netherlands	10	(1)
- * Club domestic league appearances and goals

Medal record

Men's football

Representing Netherlands

Olympic Games
Bronze medal – third place	1912 Stockholm	Team competition

Dirk Nicolaas Lotsij, sometimes spelled as Dirk Lotsy (3 July 1882 – 27 March 1965), was a Dutch amateur footballer who competed in the 1912 Summer Olympics. He was included in the Netherlands national football team, which won the bronze medal.

== Biography ==
In 1902, he was part of one of the infamous "Van Hasselt XI" sides that faced the Belgium national team in a series of unofficial meetings between the two sides in the early 1900s, netting his side's consolation goal in a 1–2 loss on 15 December 1902.

On 30 April 1905, Lotsij went down in history as one of the eleven footballers who played in the first-ever game of the Netherlands national team at the Coupe Vanden Abeele, helping his side to a 4–1 victory over Belgium in Antwerp. Lotsij then had to wait four years before earning another cap for the Dutch, which was again in a 4–1 win against Belgium on 25 April 1909.

Without playing in any other game, he was called up to the Dutch Olympic squad in 1912, starting in all four matches as a midfielder (three of which as the team captain), including the bronze medal match against Finland in which he helped his team with a 9–0 win to not only secure a second bronze medal in a row but also was a record-breaking victory for the Netherlands at the time.

It took him two more years for Lotsij to score his first and last international goal in a friendly against Germany on 5 April 1914 to help his side salvage a 4–4 draw. He played his last match for the team six weeks later, on 17 May 1914, in a friendly against Denmark.

=== International ===
Netherlands

- Olympic Games Bronze medal: 1912
