= Low Countries derby =

International football rivalry

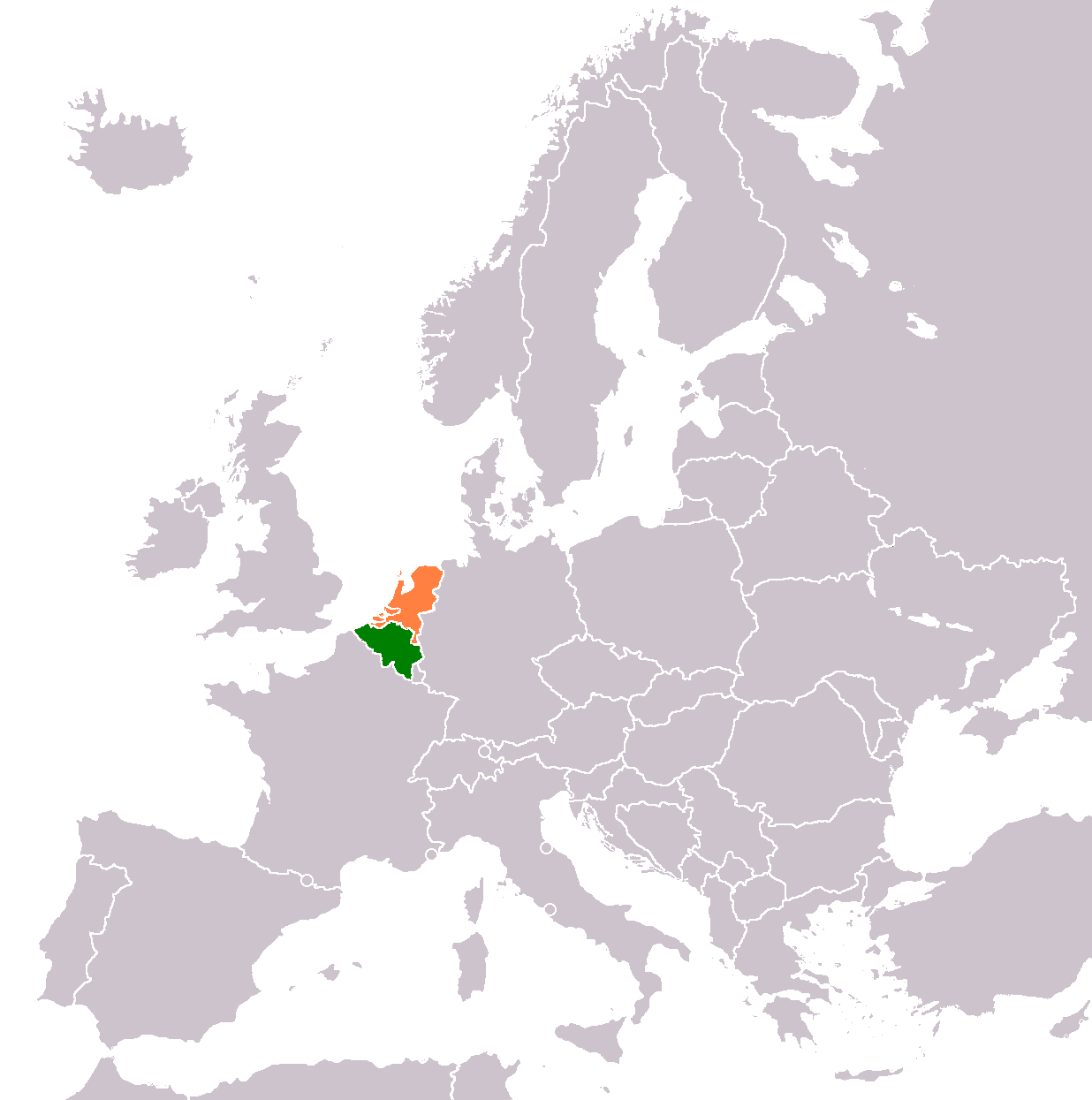
- Location: Europe (UEFA)
- Teams: Belgium; Netherlands
- First meeting: Unofficial Belgium 8–0 Netherlands (Antwerp; 28 April 1901); Official Belgium 1–4 Netherlands (Antwerp; 30 April 1905)
- Latest meeting: Netherlands 1–0 Belgium; UEFA Nations League (Amsterdam, Netherlands; 25 September 2022)

Statistics
- Total meetings: 129
- Most wins: Netherlands (57)
- All-time record: Netherlands wins: 57; Belgium wins: 41; Draws: 31
- Largest victory: Netherlands 8–0 Belgium (Amsterdam, Netherlands; 29 March 1936)
- Largest goal scoring: Netherlands 6–7 Belgium (Rotterdam, Netherlands; 25 November 1951)
- Longest win streak: Netherlands (5) (three times)
- Longest unbeaten streak: Netherlands (10)

The Low Countries derby (Dutch: Derby der Lage Landen, French: Derby des Plats Pays), is the name given in football to any match between Belgium and the Netherlands. The countries have a long-standing tradition of rivalry in football, having played over 129 official derbies so far. (Note: as of 2022) Only Austria–Hungary and Argentina–Uruguay have been contested more often. Not only have the Low Countries met 19 times in the framework of major tournaments, they have also played at least 35 friendly cup duels.

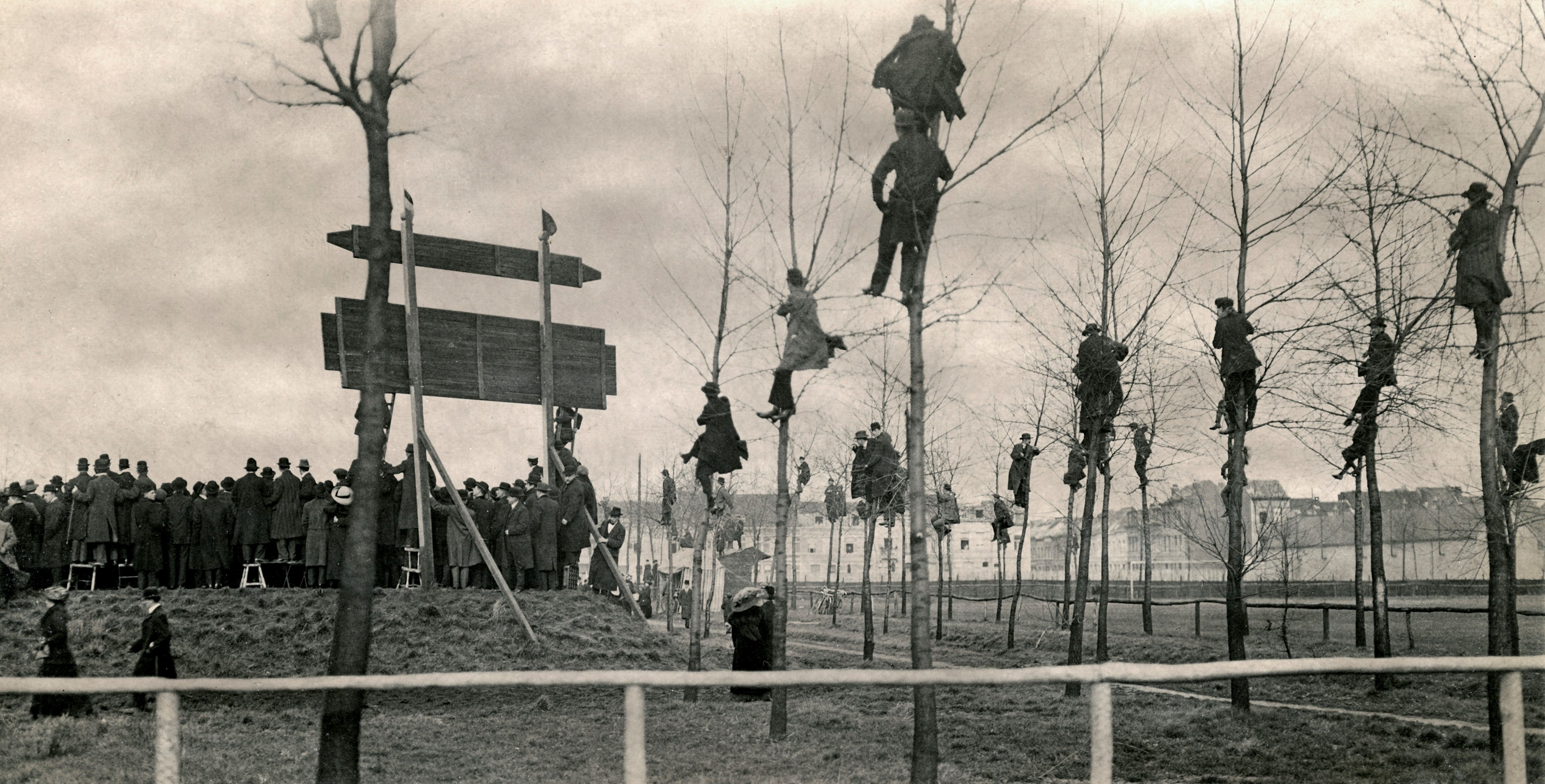
People crawl into trees to watch a Belgium–Netherlands game in Antwerp, 1913.

== All Low Countries derbies ==
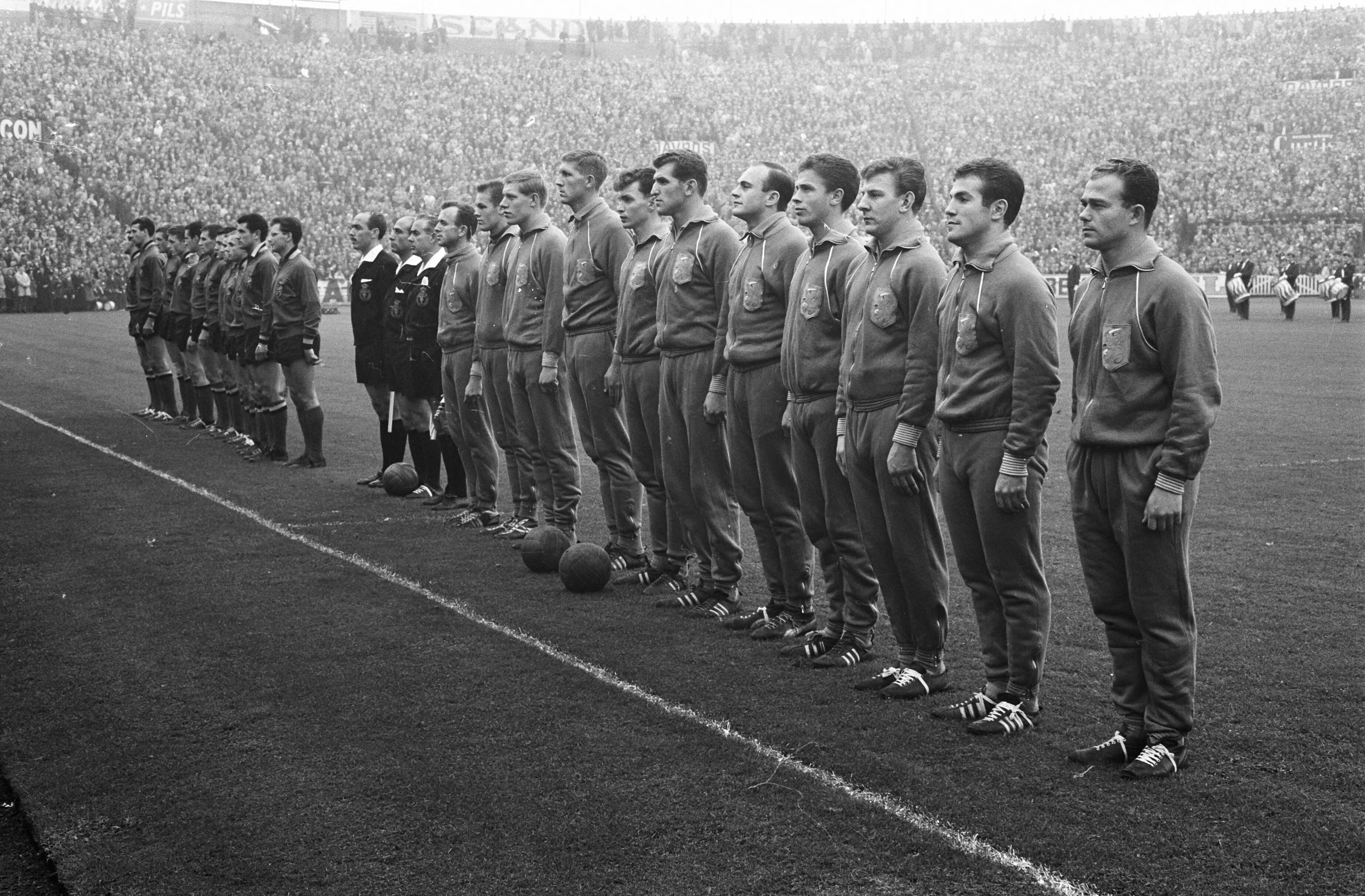
The Dutch (foreground) and Belgian teams lining up before a 1962 derby

The full official record between the two countries is as follows:

Correct as of 25 September 2022.

Competition	Played	Results			Goals	
Competition	Played	Belgium	Draw	Netherlands	Belgium	Netherlands
World Cup qualifiers	12	2	3	7	7	19
World Cup	2	1	1	0	1	0
European Championship qualifiers	2	0	0	2	1	7
European Championship	0	0	0	0	0	0
Nations League	2	0	0	2	1	4
Olympic Games	2	1	0	1	4	3
Friendly*	109	37	27	45	207	251
TOTAL	129	41	31	57	221	289
* Most games between 1905 and 1925 were friendly cup matches - see below.

== Belgium vs Netherlands Cups ==
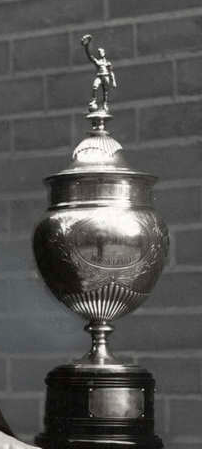
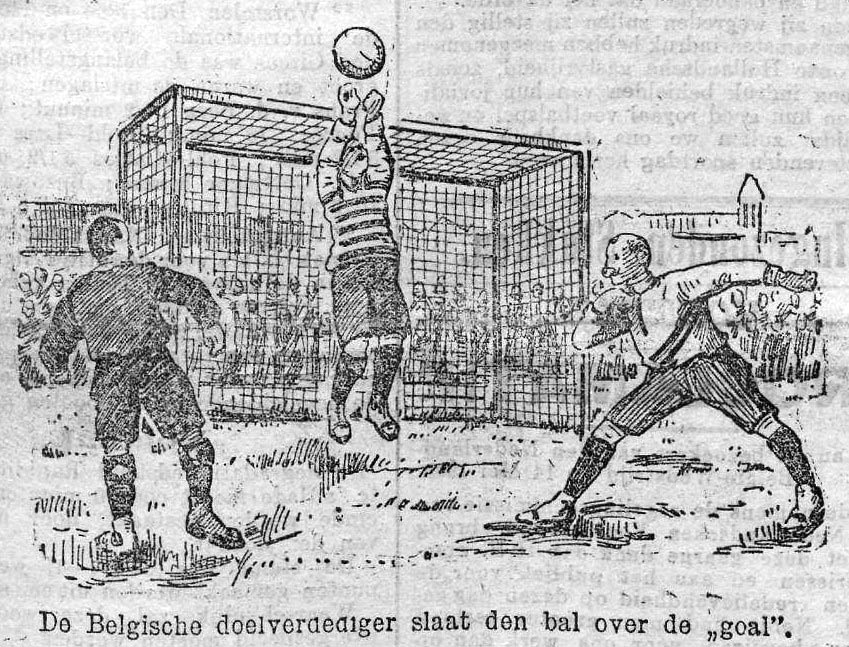
Left: The Coupe Vanden Abeele / Right: Illustration of the first Rotterdamsch Nieuwsblad-beker duel in Rotterdam in 1905

From their first friendly derbies onwards, Belgium and the Netherlands competed for floating trophies. During the encounters in Belgium the teams played for the Coupe Vanden Abeele until 1925, and in the friendlies in the Netherlands they played for the Rotterdamsch Nieuwsblad Beker until 1923, for a total of 39 Belgian-Dutch friendly cup matches (of which 35 official internationals). The cup awarded in Belgium was named after and initially handed out by Frédéric Vanden Abeele Sr., father of the secretary of Beerschot Athletic Club (where the tournament took place). As the Dutch disliked the design of this Belgian cup, they quickly nicknamed it Het Koperen Dingetje, meaning "The Copper Thingy".

Belgium-Netherlands Cup Record
Competition	Played	Results			Goals	
Competition	Played	Belgium	Draw	Netherlands	Belgium	Netherlands
(Belgium) 1905–25 Coupe Vanden Abeele	14	3*	3	8	25	34
(Netherlands) 1905–23 Rotterdamsch Nieuwsblad Beker	21	5	5	11	35	55
Total	35	8*	8	19	60	89
* Excluding the four trophies between 1901 and 1904 won by a 'Belgian' selection, as these matches are unofficial.

== See also ==
- Belgium national team rivalries
- Belgium–Netherlands relations
- Germany–Netherlands football rivalry
