= Guus Lutjens =

Dutch footballer

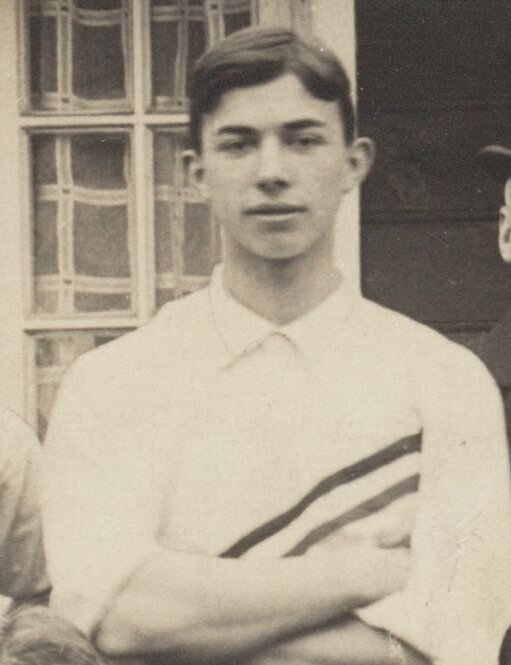
- Guus Lutjens in 1905

Personal information
- Full name: Gustaaf Willem Adolf Wolf Lutjens
- Date of birth: 13 August 1884
- Place of birth: Arnhem, Netherlands
- Date of death: 25 April 1974 (aged 89)
- Place of death: Netherlands
- Position: Forward

Senior career*
| Years | Team | Apps | (Gls) |
- Velocitas
- HVV Den Haag

International career
| 1905–1911 | Netherlands | 14 | (5) |
- * Club domestic league appearances and goals

Guus Lutjens (13 August 1884 – 25 April 1974) was a Dutch footballer who earned 14 caps for the Dutch national side between 1905 and 1911, scoring five goals. He played club football for amateur side HVV Den Haag.
