= Jacques Francken =

Dutch footballer (1891–1949)

Personal information
- Full name: Jacques Willem Eugène Ferdinand Marie Francken
- Date of birth: 17 September 1891
- Place of birth: Djombang Dutch East Indies
- Date of death: 5 June 1949 (aged 57)
- Place of death: Bloemendaal
- Position: Forward

Senior career*
Years	Team	Apps	(Gls)
1909-1919	HFC	154	

International career
1914	Netherlands	1	(1)
- * Club domestic league appearances and goals

Jacques Francken (17 September 1891 – 5 June 1949) was a Dutch male footballer. He was part of the Netherlands national football team, playing 1 match and scoring 1 goal on 15 March 1914.

On club level he played for HFC. His brothers Harry, Mannes and Peddy Francken also played for HFC.

== See also ==
- List of Dutch international footballers
