= Henk Muller =

Dutch footballer

Personal information
- Full name: Hendrik Adolph Julius Muller
- Date of birth: 24 October 1887
- Place of birth: Utrecht, Netherlands
- Date of death: 7 May 1940 (aged 52)
- Place of death: The Hague, Netherlands

Senior career*
Years	Team	Apps	(Gls)
- H.V. & C.V. Quick

International career
1906	Netherlands	2	(1)
- * Club domestic league appearances and goals

Henk Muller (24 October 1887 – 7 May 1940) was a Dutch footballer. He was part of the Netherlands national football team, playing 2 matches and scoring 1 goal. He played his first match on 29 April 1906.

== See also ==
- List of Dutch international footballers
