= Willy Westra van Holthe =

Dutch footballer

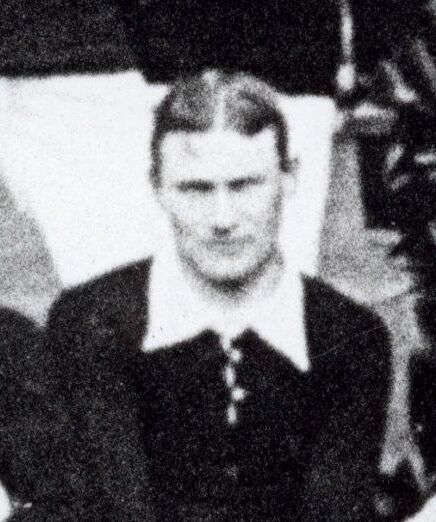
- Westra (1913)

Personal information
- Full name: Willem Rudolf Westra van Holthe
- Date of birth: 9 March 1888
- Place of birth: Kloosterveen, Assen
- Date of death: 18 May 1965 (aged 77)
- Place of death: Assen

Senior career*
Years	Team	Apps	(Gls)
1904–15, 1917–20	Achilles 1894		
1915–17	Robur et Velocitas		

International career
1913–	Netherlands	4	(1)
- * Club domestic league appearances and goals

Willy Westra van Holthe (9 March 1888 – 18 May 1965) was a Dutch footballer. He was part of the Netherlands national football team, playing 4 matches and scoring 1 goal. He played his first match on 24 March 1913.

== See also ==
- List of Dutch international footballers
