= Fernand Goossens =

Belgian footballer

Personal information
- Date of birth: 21 November 1888

International career
Years	Team	Apps	(Gls)
1908–1910	Belgium	7	(2)

Fernand Goossens (born 21 November 1888, date of death unknown) was a Belgian footballer. He played in seven matches for the Belgium national football team from 1908 to 1910.
