= Ferry van der Vinne =

Dutch footballer (1886–1947)

Personal information
- Full name: Ferdinand van der Vinne
- Date of birth: 19 July 1886
- Place of birth: Haarlem, Netherlands
- Date of death: 15 November 1947 (aged 61)
- Position: Forward

Senior career*
| Years | Team | Apps | (Gls) |
- Haarlemsche FC

International career
| 1906–1907 | Netherlands | 3 | (1) |
- * Club domestic league appearances and goals

Ferdinand "Ferry" van der Vinne (19 July 1886 – 15 November 1947) was a Dutch footballer who played as a forward. He earned three caps for the Netherlands national team between 1906 and 1907, scoring one goal. He played club football for Haarlemsche FC.
