= Sportplatz Leipzig =

Former sports complex in Leipzig, Germany

Coordinates: 51.344802°N 12.339110°E

The Sportplatz Leipzig was between 1892 and 1936 the largest sports complex in Leipzig, Germany. Today, the Kleinmesse and partly the RB Leipzig Training Center are located on the former grounds of the sports field.

== History ==
The largest football field on the site was gradually expanded to a stadium that could hold up to 20,000 spectators and corresponded to the former international court standards. This plant took the name Wettspielfeld from the inner surface of the velodrome. Several Leipzig football clubs, including the SV Lipsia 1893, the Leipziger BC 1893, the SC Wacker Leipzig and the VfB Leipzig - the first German football champions - found their first home on the sports ground before they could move into their own facilities. Between 1897 and 1905 several regional championships were played on the sports field by the Verband Leipziger Ballspiel-Verein. The first international match of a German national team in Leipzig took place on 17 November 1912 against the Netherlands on the sports field (final score 2:3) in front of 10.000 spectators. Fieldhandball and Rugby were also played in the stadium and on several small training courses.
