= René Feye =

Belgian footballer

Personal information
- Date of birth: 7 August 1881
- Date of death: 29 November 1936 (aged 55)
- Position: Midfielder

International career
Years	Team	Apps	(Gls)
1906–1907	Belgium	5	(4)

René Feye (7 August 1881 – 29 November 1936) was a Belgian footballer. He played in five matches for the Belgium national football team from 1906 to 1907.
