= Netherlands national football team results =

This article summarizes the outcomes of all official matches played by the Netherlands national football team by opponent and by decade, since they first played in official competitions in 1904.

== Record per opponent ==
The following table shows the Netherlands's all-time international record per opponent. It excludes any unofficial matches.

As of 4 October 2026

- Draws include penalty shoot-outs

Positive Record Neutral Record Negative Record

Opponent	P	W	D*	L	GF	GA	GD	%W	%D	%L
Albania	4	4	0	0	7	1	+6	100%	0%	0%
Algeria	1	0	0	1	0	1	−1	0%	0%	100%
Andorra	6	6	0	0	21	0	+21	100%	0%	0%
Argentina	10	4	5	1	15	8	+7	40%	50%	10%
Armenia	2	2	0	0	3	0	+3	100%	0%	0%
Australia	4	1	2	1	5	5	0	25%	50%	25%
Austria	21	10	4	7	40	27	+13	47.62%	19.05%	33.33%
Belarus	10	8	0	2	23	6	+18	80%	0%	20%
Belgium	129	57	31	41	285	221	+64	44.18%	24.03%	31.78%
Bosnia and Herzegovina	5	2	3	0	10	5	+5	40%	60%	0%
Brazil	12	4	5	3	18	15	+3	33.33%	41.66%	25%
Bulgaria	12	5	2	5	20	17	+3	41.66%	16.66%	41.66%
Cameroon	3	2	1	0	3	1	+2	66.66%	33.33%	0%
Canada	2	2	0	0	7	0	+7	100%	0%	0%
Chile	2	1	1	0	4	2	+2	50%	50%	0%
China	2	2	0	0	4	0	+4	100%	0%	0%
Colombia	1	0	1	0	0	0	0	0%	100%	0%
Costa Rica	1	0	1	0	0	0	0	0%	100%	0%
Croatia	3	1	0	2	6	6	0	33.33%	0%	66.66%
Curaçao (Note: Includes matches against the Netherlands Antilles.)	3	2	1	0	16	1	+15	66.66%	33.33%	0%
Cyprus	9	9	0	0	34	1	+33	100%	0%	0%
Czech Republic (Note: Includes matches against Czechoslovakia.)	21	5	4	12	22	35	−13	23.81%	19.05%	57.14%
Denmark	32	13	10	9	63	45	+18	40.62%	31.25%	28.12%
East Germany	9	6	1	2	17	10	+7	66.66%	11.11%	22.22%
Ecuador	4	1	3	0	3	2	+1	25.00%	75.00%	0%
Egypt	2	0	1	1	1	2	−1	0%	50%	50%
England	23	7	9	7	30	33	−3	30.43%	39.13%	30.43%
England Amateurs (Note: Includes matches against Great Britain.)	12	2	1	9	13	51	−38	16.67%	8.33%	75%
Estonia	6	5	1	0	23	4	+19	83.33%	16.67%	0%
Faroe Islands	1	1	0	0	3	0	+3	100%	0%	0%
Finland	16	13	2	1	49	14	+31	81.25%	12.5%	6.25%
France	31	11	5	15	57	53	+4	35.48%	16.13%	48.39%
Ghana	3	2	1	0	5	1	+4	66.66%	33.33%	0%
Georgia	1	1	0	0	3	0	+3	100%	0%	0%
Germany (Note: Includes matches against West Germany.)	49	12	19	18	80	91	−11	24.49%	38.78%	36.73%
Gibraltar	4	4	0	0	22	0	+22	100%	0%	0%
Greece	12	9	2	1	26	5	+21	75%	16.67%	8.33%
Hungary	19	11	3	5	56	30	+26	57.89%	15.79%	26.32%
Indonesia	2	2	0	0	12	2	+10	100%	0%	0%
Iceland	13	10	1	2	37	7	+30	76.92%	7.7%	15.38%
Iran	1	1	0	0	3	0	+3	100%	0%	0%
Israel	4	4	0	0	6	1	+5	100%	0%	0%
Ivory Coast	2	2	0	0	7	1	+6	100%	0%	0%
Italy	24	3	10	11	24	33	−9	12.5%	40.66%	45.83%
Japan	4	2	2	0	8	4	+4	50%	50%	0%
Kazakhstan	2	2	0	0	5	2	+3	100%	0%	0%
Latvia	5	5	0	0	14	0	+14	100%	0%	0%
Liechtenstein	1	1	0	0	3	0	+3	100%	0%	0%
Lithuania	2	2	0	0	7	2	+5	100%	0%	0%
Luxembourg	18	15	1	2	67	14	+53	83.33%	5.55%	11.11%
North Macedonia	5	3	2	0	11	3	+8	60%	40%	0%
Malta	8	8	0	0	40	0	+40	100%	0%	0%
Mexico	9	4	1	4	15	16	−1	44.44%	11.11%	44.44%
Moldova	4	4	0	0	9	1	+8	100%	0%	0%
Montenegro	2	1	1	0	6	2	+4	50%	50%	0%
Morocco	4	2	1	1	6	5	+1	50%	25%	25%
Nigeria	1	1	0	0	5	1	+4	100%	0%	0%
Northern Ireland	8	4	3	1	17	5	+12	50%	37.50%	12.50%
Norway	23	11	7	5	49	29	+20	47.82%	30.43%	21.73%
Paraguay	2	1	1	0	5	1	+4	50%	50%	0%
Peru	4	3	1	0	7	1	+6	75%	25%	0%
Poland	22	10	9	3	32	22	+10	45.45%	40.91%	13.64%
Portugal	14	2	4	8	10	16	−6	14.29%	28.57%	57.14%
Qatar	1	1	0	0	2	0	+2	100%	0%	0%
Republic of Ireland	24	13	4	7	43	30	+13	54.16%	16.67%	29.16%
Romania	15	11	3	1	32	3	+29	73.33%	20%	6.67%
Russia (Note: Includes matches against the Soviet Union and the CIS.)	10	4	3	3	14	9	+5	40%	30%	30%
Saar	2	2	0	0	5	3	+2	100%	0%	0%
San Marino	6	6	0	0	39	0	+39	100%	0%	0%
Saudi Arabia	1	1	0	0	2	1	+1	100%	0%	0%
Scotland	20	10	5	5	32	15	+17	50%	25%	25%
Senegal	1	1	0	0	2	0	+2	100%	0%	0%
Serbia (Note: Includes matches against Yugoslavia and Serbia and Montenegro.)	12	8	1	3	22	14	+8	66.67%	8.33%	25%
Slovakia	3	2	1	0	5	2	+3	66.66%	33.33%	0%
Slovenia	2	2	0	0	3	0	+3	100%	0%	0%
South Africa	2	2	0	0	4	1	+3	100%	0%	0%
South Korea	2	2	0	0	7	0	+7	100%	0%	0%
Spain	15	6	4	5	24	23	+1	40%	26.67%	33.33%
Suriname	1	1	0	0	4	3	+1	100%	0%	0%
Sweden	26	12	6	8	52	49	+3	46.15%	23.08%	30.77%
Switzerland	33	15	3	15	68	61	+7	45.45%	9.09%	45.45%
Thailand	1	1	0	0	3	1	+2	100%	0%	0%
Tunisia	3	1	2	0	7	3	+4	33.33%	66.66%	0%
Turkey	15	7	4	4	23	15	+8	46.66%	26.67%	26.67%
Ukraine	3	2	1	0	7	3	+4	66.66%	33.33%	0%
Uruguay	6	2	1	3	7	9	−2	33.33%	16.66%	50%
United States	6	5	0	1	13	6	+5	80%	0%	20%
Uzbekistan	1	1	0	0	2	1	+1	100%	0%	0%
Wales	10	10	0	0	29	8	+21	100%	0%	0%
Total	893	457	201	235	1,852	1,131	+721	51.18%	22.51%	26.31%

== Results in chronological order ==
=== 1900s and 1910s ===
45 matches played:

1905–1919
Win Draw Defeat
M	Date	Opponent	Result	Event
1	1905-04-30	Belgium	1–4	Friendly
2	1905-05-14	Belgium	4–0	Friendly
3	1906-04-29	Belgium	0–5	Friendly
4	1906-05-13	Belgium	3–2	Friendly
5	1907-04-01	England	1–8	Friendly
6	1907-04-14	Belgium	3–1	Friendly
7	1907-05-09	Belgium	2–1	Friendly
8	1907-12-21	England	2–12	Friendly
9	1908-03-29	Belgium	1–4	Friendly
10	1908-04-26	Belgium	3–1	Friendly
11	1908-05-10	France	4–1	Friendly
12	1908-10-22	Great Britain	0–4	(United Kingdom) 1908 S.O
13	1908-10-23	Sweden	2–0	(United Kingdom) 1908 S.O
14	1908-10-25	Sweden	5–3	Friendly
15	1909-03-21	Belgium	1–4	Friendly
16	1909-04-12	England	0–4	Friendly
17	1909-04-25	Belgium	4–1	Friendly
18	1909-12-11	England	1–9	Friendly
19	1910-03-13	Belgium	2–3	Friendly
20	1910-04-10	Belgium	7–0	Friendly
21	1910-04-24	Germany	4–2	Friendly
22	1910-10-16	Germany	1–2	Friendly
23	1911-03-19	Belgium	1–5	Friendly
24	1911-04-10	Belgium	3–1	Friendly
25	1911-04-17	England	0–1	Friendly
26	1912-03-10	Belgium	1–2	Friendly
27	1912-03-16	England	0–4	Friendly
28	1912-03-24	Germany	5–5	Friendly
29	1912-04-28	Belgium	4–3	Friendly
30	1912-06-29	Sweden	4–3	(Sweden) 1912 S.O
31	1912-06-30	Austria	3–1	(Sweden) 1912 S.O
32	1912-07-02	Denmark	1–4	(Sweden) 1912 S.O
33	1912-07-04	Finland	9–0	(Sweden) 1912 S.O
34	1912-11-17	Germany	3–2	Friendly
35	1913-03-09	Belgium	3–3	Friendly
36	1913-03-24	England	2–1	Friendly
37	1913-04-20	Belgium	2–4	Friendly
38	1913-11-15	England	1–2	Friendly
39	1914-03-15	Belgium	4–2	Friendly
40	1914-04-05	Germany	4–4	Friendly
41	1914-04-26	Belgium	4–2	Friendly
42	1914-05-17	Denmark	3–4	Friendly
43	1919-06-09	Sweden	3–1	Friendly
44	1919-08-24	Sweden	1–4	Friendly
45	1919-08-31	Norway	1–1	Friendly

=== 1920s and 1930s ===
112 matches played:

1920–1939
Win Draw Defeat
M	Date	Opponent	Result	Event
46	1920-04-05	Denmark	2–0	Friendly
47	1920-05-13	Italy	1–1	Friendly
48	1920-05-16	Switzerland	1–2	Friendly
49	1920-08-28	Luxembourg	3–0	(Belgium) 1920 S.O.
50	1920-08-29	Sweden	5–4	(Belgium) 1920 S.O.
51	1920-08-31	Belgium	0–3	(Belgium) 1920 S.O.
52	1920-09-05	Spain	1–3	(Belgium) 1920 S.O.
53	1921-03-26	Switzerland	2–0	Friendly
54	1921-05-08	Italy	2–2	Friendly
55	1921-05-15	Belgium	1–1	Friendly
56	1921-06-12	Denmark	1–1	Friendly
57	1921-11-13	France	0–5	Friendly
58	1922-03-26	Belgium	4–0	Friendly
59	1922-04-17	Denmark	2–0	Friendly
60	1922-05-07	Belgium	1–2	Friendly
61	1922-11-19	Switzerland	0–5	Friendly
62	1923-04-02	France	8–1	Friendly
63	1923-04-29	Belgium	1–1	Friendly
64	1923-05-10	Germany	0–0	Friendly
65	1923-11-25	Switzerland	4–1	Friendly
66	1924-03-23	Belgium	1–1	Friendly
67	1924-04-21	Germany	0–1	Friendly
68	1924-04-27	Belgium	1–1	Friendly
69	1924-05-27	Romania	6–0	(France) 1924 S.O.
70	1924-06-02	Irish Free State	2–1	(France) 1924 S.O.
71	1924-06-06	Uruguay	1–2	(France) 1924 S.O.
72	1924-06-08	Sweden	1–1	(France) 1924 S.O.
73	1924-06-09	Sweden	1–3	(France) 1924 S.O.
74	1924-11-02	South Africa	2–1	Friendly
75	1925-03-15	Belgium	0–1	Friendly
76	1925-03-29	Germany	2–1	Friendly
77	1925-04-19	Switzerland	1–4	Friendly
78	1925-05-03	Belgium	5–0	Friendly
79	1925-10-25	Denmark	4–2	Friendly
80	1926-03-14	Belgium	1–1	Friendly
81	1926-03-28	Switzerland	5–0	Friendly
82	1926-04-18	Germany	4–2	Friendly
83	1926-05-02	Belgium	1–5	Friendly
84	1926-06-13	Denmark	4–1	Friendly
85	1926-10-31	Germany	2–3	Friendly
86	1927-03-13	Belgium	2–0	Friendly
87	1927-04-18	Czechoslovakia Amateurs	8–1	Friendly
88	1927-05-01	Belgium	3–2	Friendly
89	1927-06-12	Denmark	1–1	Friendly
90	1927-11-13	Sweden	1–0	Friendly
91	1927-11-20	Germany	2–2	Friendly
92	1928-03-11	Belgium	1–1	Friendly
93	1928-04-01	Belgium	0–1	Friendly
94	1928-04-22	Denmark	2–0	Friendly
95	1928-05-06	Switzerland	2–1	Friendly
96	1928-05-30	Uruguay	0–2	(Netherlands) 1928 S.O.
97	1928-06-05	Belgium	3–1	(Netherlands) 1928 S.O.
98	1928-06-08	Chile	2–2	(Netherlands) 1928 S.O.
99	1928-06-14	Egypt	1–2	Friendly
100	1928-11-04	Belgium	1–1	Friendly
101	1928-12-02	Italy	3–2	Friendly
102	1929-03-17	Switzerland	3–2	Friendly
103	1929-05-05	Belgium	3–1	Friendly
104	1929-06-09	Sweden	6–2	Friendly
105	1929-06-12	Norway	4–4	Friendly
106	1929-11-03	Norway	1–4	Friendly
107	1930-04-06	Italy	1–1	Friendly
108	1930-05-04	Belgium	2–2	Friendly
109	1930-05-18	Belgium	3–1	Friendly
110	1930-06-08	Hungary	6–2	Friendly
111	1930-11-02	Switzerland	6–3	Friendly
112	1931-03-29	Belgium	3–2	Friendly
113	1931-04-26	Germany	1–1	Friendly
114	1931-05-03	Belgium	4–2	Friendly
115	1931-06-14	Denmark	2–0	Friendly
116	1931-11-29	France	3–4	Friendly
117	1932-03-29	Belgium	1–4	Friendly
118	1932-04-17	Belgium	2–1	Friendly
119	1932-05-08	Irish Free State	0–2	Friendly
120	1932-05-29	Czechoslovakia	1–2	Friendly
121	1932-12-04	Germany	2–0	Friendly
122	1933-01-22	Switzerland	0–2	Friendly
123	1933-03-05	Hungary	1–2	Friendly
124	1933-04-09	Belgium	1–3	Friendly
125	1933-05-07	Belgium	1–2	Friendly
126	1933-12-10	Austria	0–1	Friendly
127	1934-03-11	Belgium	9–3	Friendly
128	1934-04-08	Irish Free State	5–2	(Italy) 1934 W.C. Q
129	1934-04-29	Belgium	2–4	(Italy) 1934 W.C. Q
130	1934-05-10	France	4–5	Friendly
131	1934-05-27	Italy	2–3	(Italy) 1934 W.C.
132	1934-11-04	Switzerland	2–4	Friendly
133	1935-02-17	Germany	2–3	Friendly
134	1935-03-31	Belgium	4–2	Friendly
135	1935-05-12	Belgium	0–2	Friendly
136	1935-05-18	England	0–1	Friendly
137	1935-11-03	Denmark	3–0	Friendly
138	1935-12-08	Irish Free State	3–5	Friendly
139	1936-01-12	France	1–6	Friendly
140	1936-03-29	Belgium	8–0	Friendly
141	1936-05-03	Belgium	1–1	Friendly
142	1936-11-01	Norway	3–3	Friendly
143	1937-01-31	Germany	2–2	Friendly
144	1937-03-07	Switzerland	2–1	Friendly
145	1937-04-04	Belgium	2–1	Friendly
146	1937-05-02	Belgium	1–0	Friendly
147	1937-10-31	France	2–3	Friendly
148	1937-11-28	Luxembourg	4–0	(France) 1938 W.C. Q
149	1938-02-27	Belgium	7–2	Friendly
150	1938-04-03	Belgium	1–1	(France) 1938 W.C. Q
151	1938-05-21	Scotland	1–3	Friendly
152	1938-06-05	Czechoslovakia	3–0	(France) 1938 W.C.
153	1938-10-23	Denmark	2–2	Friendly
154	1939-02-26	Hungary	3–2	Friendly
155	1939-03-19	Belgium	5–4	Friendly
156	1939-04-23	Belgium	3–2	Friendly
157	1939-05-07	Switzerland	2–1	Friendly

=== 1940s and 1950s ===
1940–1959
Win Draw Defeat
M	Date	Opponent	Result	Event
158	1940-03-17	Belgium	7–1	Friendly
159	1940-03-31	Luxembourg	4–5	Friendly
160	1940-04-21	Belgium	4–2	Friendly
161	1946-03-10	Belgium	2–6	Friendly
162	1946-05-12	Belgium	6–3	Friendly
163	1946-05-30	Belgium	2–2	Friendly
164	1946-11-27	England	8–2	Friendly
165	1947-04-07	Belgium	2–1	Friendly
166	1947-05-04	Belgium	1-2	Friendly
167	1947-05-26	France	4-0	Friendly
168	1947-09-21	Switzerland	6-2	Friendly
169	1948-03-14	Belgium	1-1	Friendly
170	1948-04-18	Belgium	2-2	Friendly
171	1948-05-26	Norway	1-2	Friendly
172	1948-06-09	Sweden	1-0	Friendly
173	1948-07-26	Republic of Ireland	1-3	(United Kingdom) 1948 S.O.
174	1948-07-31	Great Britain	4-3	(United Kingdom) 1948 S.O.
175	1948-11-21	Belgium	1-1	Friendly
176	1949-03-13	Belgium	3-3	Friendly
177	1949-04-23	France	4-1	Friendly
178	1949-06-12	Denmark	1-2	Friendly
179	1949-06-16	Finland	1-2	Friendly
180	1949-11-06	Belgium	1-2	Friendly
181	1949-12-11	Denmark	0-1	Friendly
182	1950-04-16	Belgium	2–0	Friendly
183	1950-06-08	Sweden	4-1	Friendly
184	1950-06-11	Finland	4-1	Friendly
185	1950-10-15	Switzerland	7-4	Friendly
186	1950-11-12	Belgium	7-2	Friendly
187	1950-12-10	France	5-2	Friendly
188	1951-04-15	Belgium	5-4	Friendly
189	1951-06-06	Norway	2-3	Friendly
190	1951-10-27	Finland	4-4	Friendly
191	1951-11-25	Belgium	6-7	Friendly
192	1952-04-06	Belgium	4-2	Friendly
193	1952-05-14	Sweden	4-4	Friendly
194	1952-07-16	Brazil	1-5	(Finland) 1952 S.O.
195	1952-09-21	Denmark	3-2	Friendly
196	1952-10-19	Belgium	2-1	Friendly
196	1952-11-15	England	2-2	Friendly

=== 1960s and 1970s ===
1960–1979
Win Draw Defeat
M	Date	Opponent	Result	Event

=== 1980s and 1990s ===
1980–1999
Win Draw Defeat
M	Date	Opponent	Result	Event

=== 2000s ===
2000–2009
Win Draw Defeat
M	Date	Opponent	Result	Event

=== 2010s ===
2010–2019
Win Draw Defeat
M	Date	Opponent	Result	Event

=== 2020s ===
2020–2029
Win Draw Defeat
M	Date	Opponent	Result	Event
809	2020-09-04	Poland	1–0	2020–21 UEFA Nations League
810	2020-09-07	Italy	0–1	2020–21 UEFA Nations League
811	2020-10-07	Mexico	0–1	Friendly
812	2020-10-11	Bosnia and Herzegovina	0–0	2020–21 UEFA Nations League
813	2020-10-14	Italy	0–0	2020–21 UEFA Nations League
814	2020-10-07	Spain	1–1	Friendly
815	2020-11-15	Bosnia and Herzegovina	3–1	2020–21 UEFA Nations League
816	2020-11-18	Poland	1–2	2020–21 UEFA Nations League
817	2021-03-24	Turkey	4–2	(Qatar) 2022 W.C. Q
818	2021-03-27	Latvia	2-0	(Qatar) 2022 W.C. Q
819	2021-03-30	Gibraltar	0-7	(Qatar) 2022 W.C. Q
820	2021-06-02	Scotland	2–2	Friendly
821	2021-06-06	Georgia	3-0	Friendly
822	2021-06-13	Ukraine	3-2	(Europe) Euro 2020
823	2021-06-17	Austria	2-0	(Europe) Euro 2020
824	2021-06-21	North Macedonia	0-3	(Europe) Euro 2020
825	2021-06-27	Czech Republic	0-2	(Europe) Euro 2020
