= Nol van Berckel =

Dutch footballer and judge

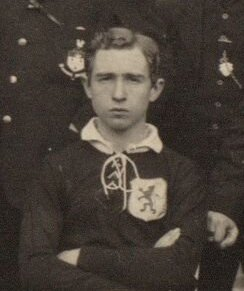
- Nol van Berckel in 1911

Personal information
- Full name: Arnoldus Louis Maria van Berckel
- Date of birth: 22 December 1890
- Place of birth: Amsterdam
- Date of death: 8 September 1973 (aged 82)
- Place of death: Gendringen, Netherlands

Senior career*
Years	Team	Apps	(Gls)
1909–1913	Quick 1888		

International career
1910–1912	Netherlands	6	(2)
- * Club domestic league appearances and goals

Arnoldus Louis Maria van Berckel (22 December 1890 – 8 September 1973) was a Dutch footballer and judge.

== Early life ==
Arnoldus Louis Maria van Berckel was born on 22 December 1890 in Amsterdam.

== Football career ==
=== International ===
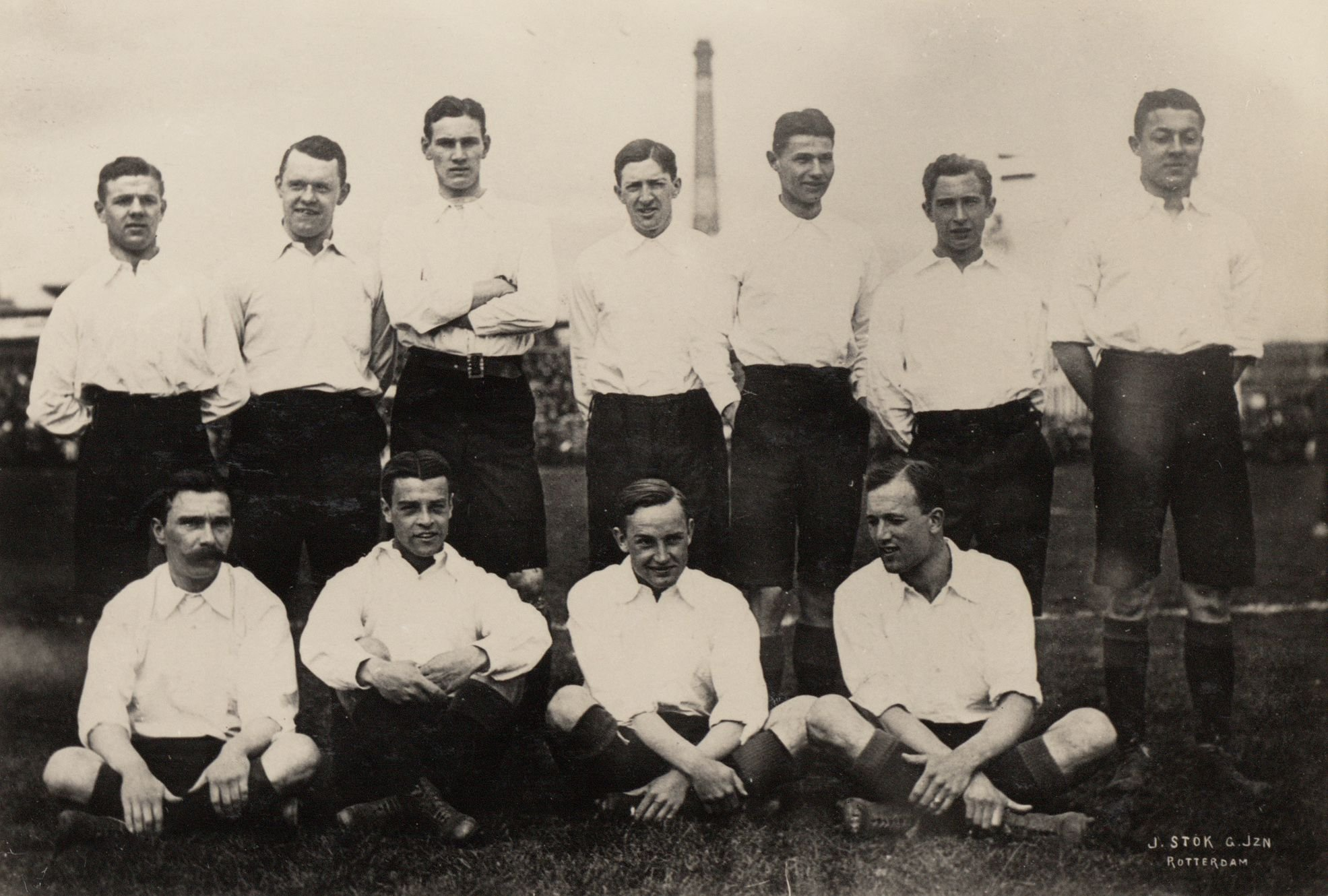
Netherland vs Belgium in 1912 with van Berckel standing, second right

Van Berckel was part of the Netherlands national football team, playing 6 matches and scoring 2 goals. He played his first match on 16 October 1910 against Germany and his final game was an April 1912 friendly match against Belgium.

== Judicial career ==
Under the more formal name Arnold Louis Maria van Berckel he had a successful career as a judge. After World War II he was the head judge of the court of The Hague. The trial of Anton Mussert in November 1945 was, for example, held under his supervision.

== See also ==
- List of Dutch international footballers
