= Désiré Paternoster =

Belgian footballer

Personal information
- Date of birth: 21 January 1887

International career
Years	Team	Apps	(Gls)
1908–1911	Belgium	9	(2)

Désiré Paternoster (born 21 January 1887, date of death unknown) was a Belgian footballer. He played in nine matches for the Belgium national football team from 1908 to 1911.
