= Cas Ruffelse =

Dutch footballer (1888–1958)

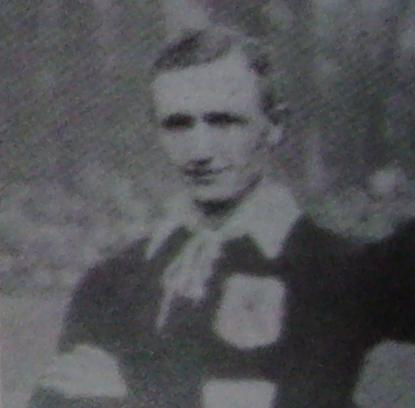

Personal information
- Full name: Casperius Wilhelm Ruffelse
- Date of birth: 9 February 1888
- Place of birth: Rotterdam
- Date of death: 9 September 1958 (aged 70)

Senior career*
Years	Team	Apps	(Gls)
1907–1926	Sparta Rotterdam	282	

International career
1907–	Netherlands	8	(3)
- * Club domestic league appearances and goals

Cas Ruffelse (9 February 1888 – 9 September 1958) was a Dutch male footballer. He was part of the Netherlands national football team, playing 8 matches and scoring 3 goals. He played his first match on 21 December 1907.

== See also ==
- List of Dutch international footballers
