= Jules Suetens =

Belgian footballer

International career
Years	Team	Apps	(Gls)
1908–1914	Belgium	7	(1)

Jules Suetens was a Belgian footballer. He played in seven matches for the Belgium national football team from 1908 to 1914.
