= Edu Snethlage =

Dutch footballer and physician

Ed Snethlage
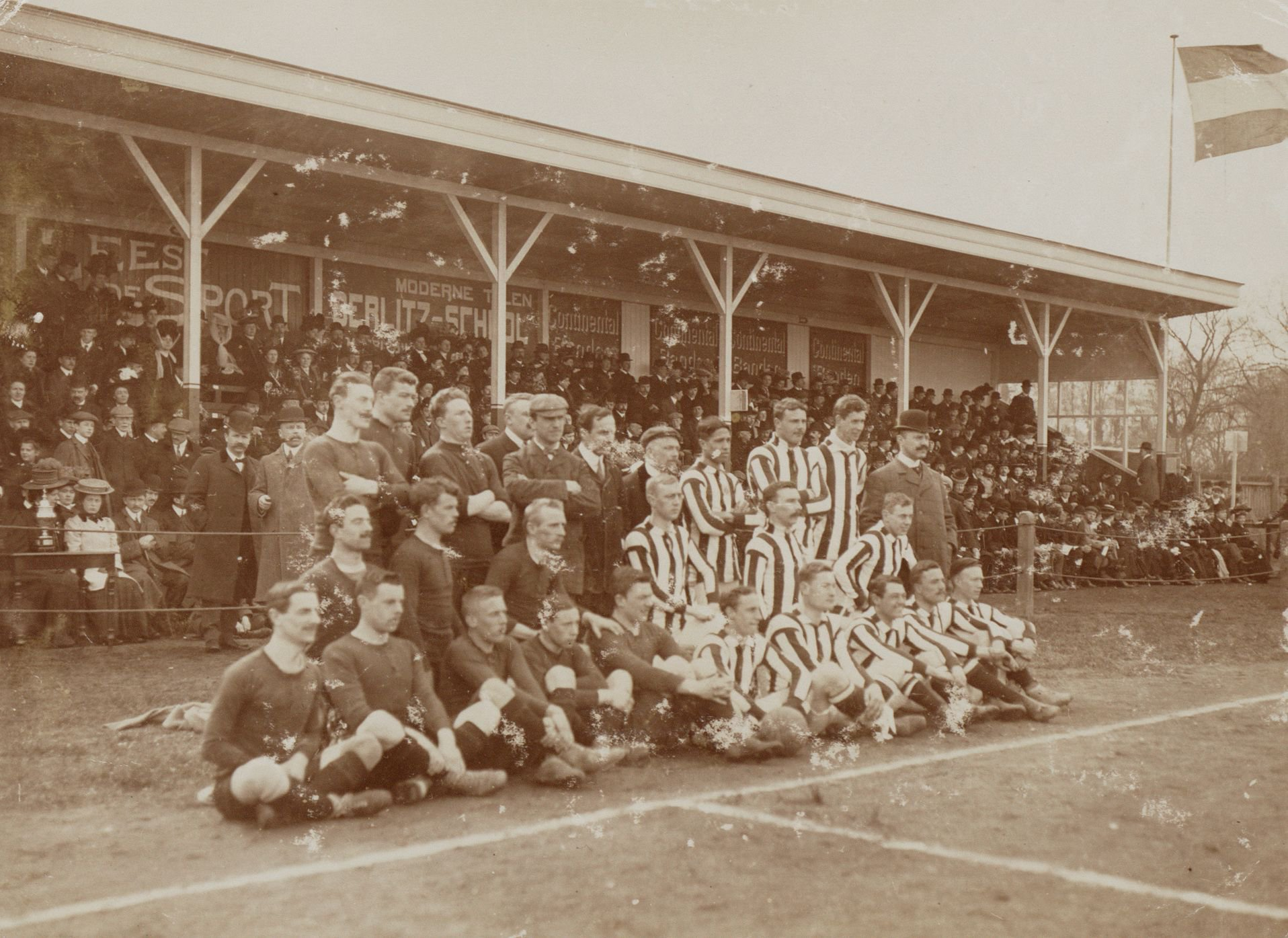
- Snethlage and the Netherlands national team in 1908 (in this match, against Belgium, Snethlage scored)

Personal information
- Full name: Everardus Snethlage
- Date of birth: 9 May 1886
- Place of birth: Ngawi, Dutch East Indies
- Date of death: 12 January 1941 (aged 54)
- Place of death: Medan, Dutch East Indies
- Position: Forward

Senior career*
Years	Team	Apps	(Gls)
1903-1910	HVV Quick	+80	(53)

International career
1907–1909	Netherlands	11	(10)
- * Club domestic league appearances and goals

Olympic medal record

Men's Football
Bronze medal – third place	1908 London	Team Competition

Everardus "Edu" Snethlage (9 May 1886 – 12 January 1941) was a Dutch physician and footballer who played as a forward for HVV Quick and the Netherlands national team, becoming the all-time top scorer of the latter in 1909.

Snethlage spent his entire playing career at HVV Quick in The Hague, thus being part of the so-called one-club men group. In total, he scored 53 goals in over 80 matches for the club, with his goalscoring performances proving crucial in helping the club win the Dutch championship in 1908, as well as three consecutive KNVB Cups between 1909 and 1911, netting once in a 6–1 win over HBS Craeyenhout in the final, to help his side win the only Cup title in the club's history. He was a member of the team that won the bronze medal in the football tournament of the 1908 Summer Olympics.

== Club career ==
Everardus Snethlage was born on 9 May 1886 in Ngawi, Dutch East Indies, to a former German pastoral family. Snethlage began playing football with HVV Quick, which he joined in June 1901, at the age of 15, together with his two-year older brother Bram, who would also make it to the first team. Snethlage would only play in the lower teams for a year. As early as 1903, barely 17 years old, he was already a regular in the first team. Initially, Snethlage played in midfield as a right winger, but from the 1906–07 season onwards, he was drafted into the frontline, first as a center forward, but soon as inside right. This adjustment proved to be a game-changer as he formed for years a formidable attacking partnership with Caius Welcker, as they formed the most feared right wing that the Netherlands had known until that time. The two of them were nicknamed "scientific" by the media, likely referring to them being students. They played a crucial role in helping HVV Quick become the champions of the Netherlands in 1908, a championship in which they played together in every match.

After a match in Antwerp against "Manchester University", he was declared the star of the match by the English referee James, who stated that "Snethlage is one of the few players in (continental) Europe that is at the same level as the English professional footballers", and adding that he would be in the highest salary class in England as a professional. Snethlage was indeed so coveted by the English that Hull City FC offered him a professional contract in 1909 during a trip from Quick to Sheffield, but although he feels honored, he immediately rejects the offer because he wanted to establish himself as a doctor in the Dutch East Indies, where he was born, and certainly not as a professional football player. At the end of 1909, Bolton Wanderers also tried to persuade Snethlage to play for them in two games around Christmas, but this offer was also declined.

On 19 December 1909, Snethlage scored twice in the home game against HBS. They would prove to be his last league goals, as a knee injury made it impossible for him to play football. In the second half of the 1909–10 season, he missed 8 of the 9 games and only played in the home game against HFC Haarlem on 6 February 1910, in which he dropped out halfway through the second half. Snethlage did start the 1910–11 season but fell out just before half-time in the game for the Zilveren Bal against Velocitas from Breda because of the same knee injury that had also sidelined him for most of the second half of the previous season. Snethlage retired shortly after, having been only 24 years old at the time.

== International career ==
Snethlage represented the Dutch team at the 1908 Summer Olympics, playing both matches as an inside right as he helped his nation win the bronze medal in the football tournament. Snethlage spent the night before the bronze medal match in the London nightlife, emerging only at the field with just a few minutes to go. The manager Edgar Chadwick was furious, but put Snethlage on the team, who played great and scored the second and decisive goal in a 2–0 win over Sweden. In all of his international matches, Snethlage formed the right wing together with Caius Welcker, just like with Quick. Coincidentally, Snethlage's international career started with a 12–2 defeat against England amateurs, the biggest loss in the history of the Dutch team, and ended against the same opponent with a 9–1 loss, being the captain in the latter. Between these two games, Snethlage played a further nine, scoring 10 goals.

Snethlage became the all-time top scorer for the Netherlands national team on 21 March 1909. His opening goal of the match against Belgium was his seventh goal for the Netherlands, breaking the then record of six goals that Eddy de Neve had held since 14 May 1905. Snethlage improved his record by scoring a hat-trick in the Low Countries derby against Belgium on 25 April 1909. He was, therefore, the first player to reach double figures for the Netherlands national team and retired from the team being its all-time top scorer. When he sustained his knee injury, Snethlage had been in the Netherlands starting eleven for eleven consecutive international matches, and thus, without a knee injury, Snethlage would have played more international matches. His record was superseded on 16 October 1910, when Jan Thomée scored his eleventh goal for the Netherlands in a match against Germany.

In addition to the Netherlands national team, Snethlage also played for the Western national team, albeit only once. On 15 March 1908, the West defeated the Eastern team 7–2 at the PW site in Enschede.

Snethlage also played for the De Zwaluwen team. Snethlage scored the very first goal in the history of De Zwaluwen on 21 November 1907 at the HVV site when two Zwaluwen test teams played against each other there. On 23 May 1909, Snethlage played for the last time in Zwaluwenverband in Amsterdam on the grounds of RAP against the Bolton Wanderers. Here too he formed the right wing with Welcker. Despite the heavy defeat, Snethlage had apparently made a big impression on the "Trotters" given the offer Snethlage received six months later to play with Bolton.

== After football ==
Snethlage took the State Examination for admission to the university's Faculty of Medicine from 25 to 27 August 1904 and passed. Snethlage went to study at Leiden and, in October 1906, passed the preparatory examination in medicine. This was followed by July 1908 by the bachelor's examination and finally, in September 1911, by the doctoral examination in medicine. For the last part of his training, Snethlage left for Amsterdam, where he was promoted to physician on 31 May 1913 by the State Medical Commission. After retiring from football in late 1910, he returned to the Dutch East Indies (now Indonesia) and practiced as a doctor.

Snethlage has been married twice. On 6 February 1925, he married Louise Henriette Van der Jagt in Soerabaja; the marriage ended in divorce in the early 1930s. A second marriage took place on 15 June 1931 with Wilhelmina Maria Antonia Josephina Van der Poel. Both marriages remained childless.

== Death ==
Snethlage died on 19 October 1940 at the age of 54. The cause is unknown, but it cannot have anything to do with World War II because the Japanese would not invade the country until a year later. Snethlage's burial at the General Cemetery in Medan attracted great interest.

== International goals ==
Netherlands score listed first, score column indicates score after each Snethlage goal.

List of international goals scored by Snethlage.
No.	Date	Venue	Opponent	Score	Result	Competition
1.	26 April 1908	Prinsenlaan, Rotterdam, Netherlands	Belgium	1–0	3–1	1908 Rotterdamsch Nieuwsblad Beker
2.	10 May 1908	Prinsenlaan, Rotterdam, Netherlands	France	1–0	4–1	Friendly match
3.	10 May 1908	Prinsenlaan, Rotterdam, Netherlands	France	4–1	4–1	Friendly match
4.	23 October 1908	White City, London, England	Sweden	2–0	2–0	1908 Olympic Bronze medal match
5.	25 October 1908	De Diepput, The Hague, Netherlands	Sweden	1–0	5–3	Friendly match
6.	25 October 1908	De Diepput, The Hague, Netherlands	Sweden	4–3	5–3	Friendly match
7.	21 March 1909	Beerschot A.C. ground, Antwerp, Belgium	Sweden	1–0	4–1	1909 Coupe Vanden Abeele
8.	25 April 1909	Prinsenlaan, Rotterdam, Netherlands	Belgium	2–0	4–1	1909 Rotterdamsch Nieuwsblad Beker
9.	25 April 1909	Prinsenlaan, Rotterdam, Netherlands	Belgium	3–0	4–1	1909 Rotterdamsch Nieuwsblad Beker
10.	25 April 1909	Prinsenlaan, Rotterdam, Netherlands	Belgium	4–0	4–1	1909 Rotterdamsch Nieuwsblad Beker

== Honours ==
HVV

- Dutch championship: 1907–08
- KNVB Cup: 1908–09, 1909–10, and 1910–11

Netherlands

- Olympic Games Bronze medal: 1908
