= Mannes Francken =

Dutch footballer (1888–1948)

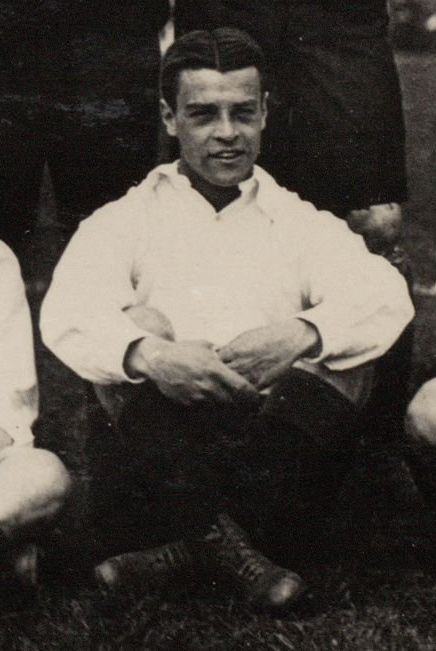

Personal information
- Full name: Herman Jean Marie Francken
- Date of birth: 20 May 1888
- Place of birth: Malang Regency, Dutch East Indies
- Date of death: 19 November 1948 (aged 60)
- Place of death: Aerdenhout, Netherlands

Senior career*
Years	Team	Apps	(Gls)
1905-1916	HFC	173	(142)

International career
1906–1914	Netherlands	22	(17)
- * Club domestic league appearances and goals

Mannes Francken (20 May 1888 – 19 November 1948) was a Dutch football player, who played for HFC and the Netherlands national team.

== Biography ==
Francken started out as a goalkeeper, but quickly became a forward. He made his international debut for the Netherlands on 29 April 1906 in a 5–0 away defeat to Belgium. He would go on to earn 22 caps, scoring 17 goals, including a then national record of three hat-tricks, all of which against Belgium. Remarkably, 12 of his international goals, including his three hat-tricks, came in friendly cup duels between Dutch and Belgians, a tally that makes him the all-time top scorer in the competition's history, however, if we include the four unofficial trophies between 1901 and 1904 then he shares this position with Herbert Potts of Belgium. The final of these goals, against Belgium on 9 March 1913, made him the all-time top scorer for the Netherlands, a record he held for more than 20 years, until when on 3 November 1935, Beb Bakhuys of HBS Craeyenhout scored his 18th goal for the Netherlands national team. Over a century after his last match Francken, he is ranked 20th in the list of all-time top scorers.

Francken played his final match for the Netherlands in 1914. He moved to the Dutch East Indies in 1916. Francken died in 1948.

His brothers Harry, Jacques and Peddy Francken also played for HFC.

== Career statistics ==
Scores and results list Netherlands's goal tally first, score column indicates score after each Francken goal.

List of international goals scored by Mannes Francken
No.	Date	Venue	Opponent	Score	Result	Competition
1	25 October 1908	De Diepput, The Hague, Netherlands	Sweden	3–3	5–3	Friendly
2	10 April 1910	De Hout, Haarlem, Netherlands	Belgium	2–0	7–0	1910 Rotterdamsch Nieuwsblad Beker
3	10 April 1910	De Hout, Haarlem, Netherlands	Belgium	4–0	7–0	1910 Rotterdamsch Nieuwsblad Beker
4	10 April 1910	De Hout, Haarlem, Netherlands	Belgium	6–0	7–0	1910 Rotterdamsch Nieuwsblad Beker
5	19 March 1911	Beerschot A.C. ground, Antwerp, Belgium	Belgium	1–0	5–1	1911 Coupe Vanden Abeele
6	19 March 1911	Beerschot A.C. ground, Antwerp, Belgium	Belgium	2–0	5–1	1911 Coupe Vanden Abeele
7	19 March 1911	Beerschot A.C. ground, Antwerp, Belgium	Belgium	3–0	5–1	1911 Coupe Vanden Abeele
8	2 April 1911	D.F.C.-terrein aan de Markettenweg, Dordrecht, Netherlands	Belgium	1–0	3–1	1911 Rotterdamsch Nieuwsblad Beker
9	2 April 1911	D.F.C.-terrein aan de Markettenweg, Dordrecht, Netherlands	Belgium	3–1	3–1	1911 Rotterdamsch Nieuwsblad Beker
10	24 March 1912	Zwolsche Atletische Club Stadion, Zwolle, Netherlands	Germany	2–3	5–5	Friendly
11	24 March 1912	Zwolsche Atletische Club Stadion, Zwolle, Netherlands	Germany	3–3	5–5	Friendly
12	28 April 1912	D.F.C.-terrein aan de Markettenweg, Dordrecht, Netherlands	Belgium	2–0	4–3	1912 Rotterdamsch Nieuwsblad Beker
13	28 April 1912	D.F.C.-terrein aan de Markettenweg, Dordrecht, Netherlands	Belgium	3–0	4–3	1912 Rotterdamsch Nieuwsblad Beker
14	28 April 1912	D.F.C.-terrein aan de Markettenweg, Dordrecht, Netherlands	Belgium	4–3	4–3	1912 Rotterdamsch Nieuwsblad Beker
15	24 March 1912	Sportplatz Leipzig, Leipzig, Germany	Germany	1–0	3–2	Friendly
16	24 March 1912	Sportplatz Leipzig, Leipzig, Germany	Germany	3–2	3–2	Friendly
17	9 March 1913	Beerschot A.C. ground, Antwerp, Belgium	Belgium	3–3	3–3	1913 Coupe Vanden Abeele

=== Records ===
- All-time top goal scorer of the Rotterdamsch Nieuwsblad Beker with 8 goals
- All-time top goal scorer of the Belgium vs Netherlands Cups with 13 goals
