= Eddy de Neve =

Dutch footballer (1885–1943)

Personal information
- Full name: Eduard Karel Alexander de Neve
- Date of death: 30 August 1943
- Position: Forward

Senior career*
Years	Team	Apps	(Gls)
1901–1902	Quick		
1902–1905	Velocitas Breda		
1905–1907	HBS Craeyenhout		

International career
1905–1906	Netherlands	3	(5)
- * Club domestic league appearances and goals

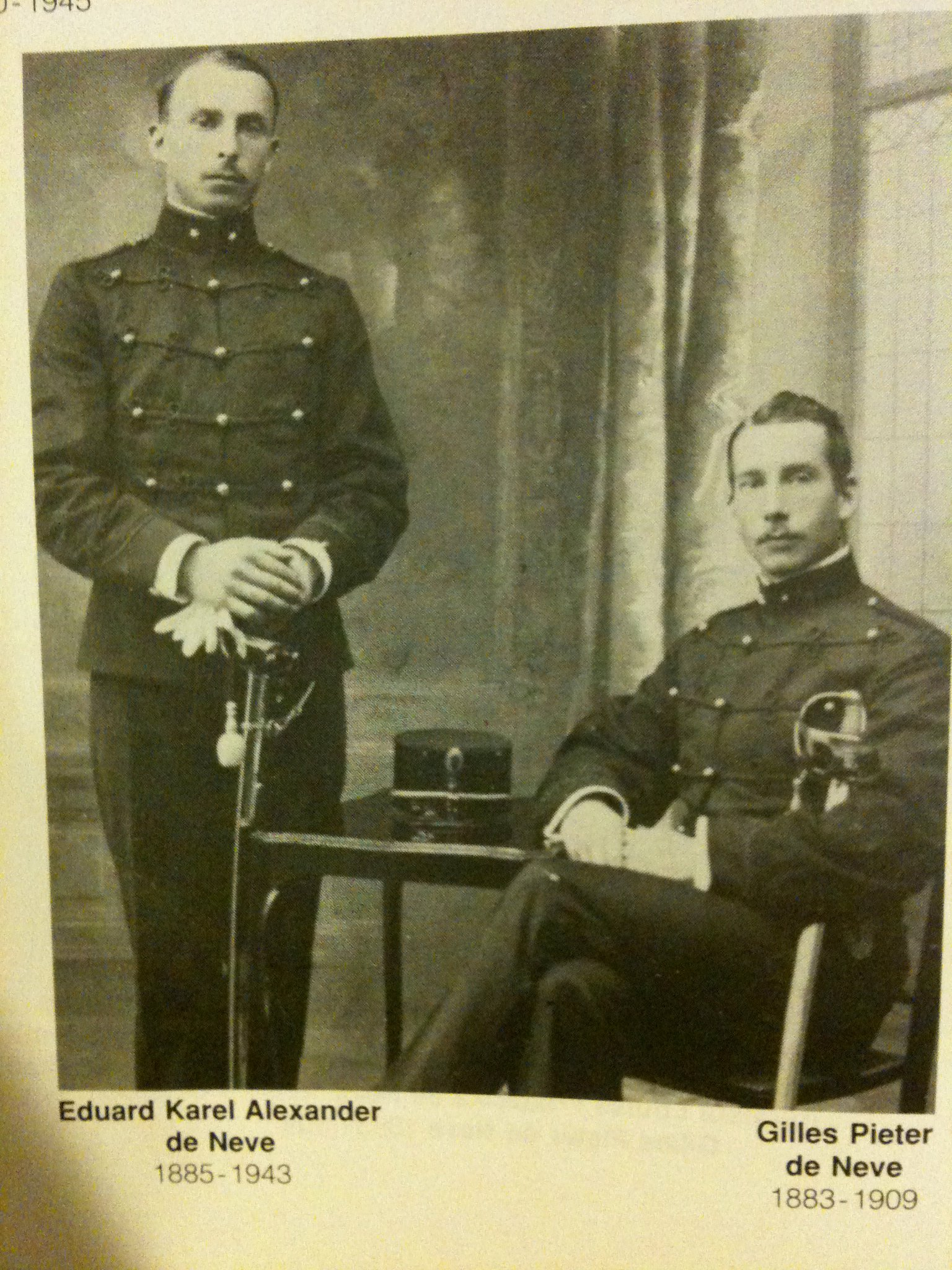
Eddy & Gilles de Neve (ca. 1905)

Eduard Karel Alexander de Neve (1 January 1882 or 2 January 1885 – 30 August 1943) was a Dutch footballer who played as a forward for Velocitas Breda, HBS Craeyenhout and the Netherlands national team.

== Early life ==
De Neve was born in either 1882 or 1885 in Batavia, Dutch East Indies, the son of Eduard Karel Alexander de Neve, a major in the Royal Dutch East Indies Army, and Johanna Christina Fokker. His father died when De Neve was 9 or 10 years old, and the family moved to the Netherlands.

== Football career ==
In The Hague, De Neve joined football club Quick. When he joined the Royal Netherlands Army, he started to play football for Velocitas Breda, which was affiliated with the Royal Military Academy of the Netherlands. He moved to HBS Craeyenhout in 1905, and won the Dutch national football title in his first season back in The Hague.

De Neve was part of the first Netherlands national team, which played for the Coupe Vanden Abeele against Belgium on 30 April 1905. De Neve made the opening goal of the match after 80 minutes. An own goal by Dutchman Ben Stom in the 86th minute was the equalizer, and the score was 1–1 after regular time. De Neve scored three goals in extra time, after 106, 117 and 119 minutes, and the final score of the match was 4–1. The Netherlands had won its first match ever, and De Neve had scored all four Dutch goals.

He was also in the Dutch squad for a return match in Rotterdam two weeks later, on 14 May 1905. The Netherlands won the match 4–0, with De Neve having scored two goals. De Neve played the third and final international match of his career on 13 May 1906, again against Belgium, this time resulting in a 2–3 loss. De Neve had scored six goals in three caps. He would remain the top scorer of the Netherlands national team until 21 March 1909, when Edu Snethlage of De Neve's former club Quick scored the opening goal of a match against Belgium, his seventh goal for the Netherlands national team.

A knee injury and military service in the Dutch East Indies forced De Neve to end his career as a football player in 1907. He published his memoirs, entitled Koning Voetbal ("King Football"), in 1938, on the occasion of the Dutch East Indies taking part in the 1938 FIFA World Cup.

== Military career ==
He was promoted to the rank of First Lieutenant on 27 July 1909, and was honourably discharged from the army two months later. In the same year, his brother Gilles was eaten by cannibals on the island of Sumba in the Dutch East Indies.

== Personal life ==
De Neve worked for several Dutch companies and plantations in the Dutch East Indies, but he struggled to get by. In 1913, he was engaged to Daisy Maud Green in the port of Genoa, Italy. The two were married on 14 August 1914 in Lubuk Sinapeng in the Dutch East Indies. They had one son, Gilles Pieter Cornelis de Neve, known as 'Gilles Jr.' The couple were divorced after 12 years; Daisy Maud and Gilles Jr. moved to The Hague, while De Neve remained in the Dutch East Indies.

== Death ==
Eddy de Neve died during the Second World War on 30 August 1943, in a Japanese concentration camp in the Dutch East Indies. His only child, Gilles Jr., died in the crash of his Royal Air Force Supermarine Spitfire in Kent, England in 1944.

== International goals ==
Netherlands score listed first, score column indicates score after each de Neve goal.

List of international goals scored by Eddy de Neve.
No.	Date	Venue	Opponent	Score	Result	Competition	References
1.	30 April 1905	Beerschot A.C. ground, Antwerp, Belgium	Belgium	1–0	4–1	1905 Coupe Vanden Abeele	
2.	30 April 1905	Beerschot A.C. ground, Antwerp, Belgium	Belgium	2–1	4–1	1905 Coupe Vanden Abeele	
3.	30 April 1905	Beerschot A.C. ground, Antwerp, Belgium	Belgium	3–1	4–1	1905 Coupe Vanden Abeele	
4.	30 April 1905	Beerschot A.C. ground, Antwerp, Belgium	Belgium	4–1	4–1	1905 Coupe Vanden Abeele	
5.	14 May 1905	Schuttersveld ground, Rotterdam, Netherlands	Belgium	2–0	4–0	1905 Rotterdamsch Nieuwsblad Beker	
