= Ben Stom =

Dutch footballer (1886–1965)

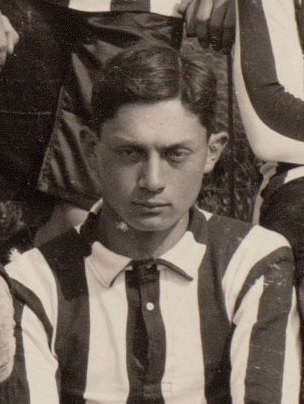
- Stom in 1907

Personal information
- Full name: Bertus Stom
- Date of birth: 13 October 1886
- Place of birth: Malang, Dutch East Indies.
- Date of death: 18 August 1965 (aged 78)
- Position: Defender

Senior career*
Years	Team	Apps	(Gls)
1904–1907	Velocitas Breda		
1907–1908	HFC Haarlem		

International career
1905–1908	Netherlands	9	(0)
- * Club domestic league appearances and goals

Bertus "Ben" Stom (13 October 1886 – 18 August 1965) was a Dutch footballer.

== Early life ==
Stom was born in Malang, Dutch East Indies (now Indonesia) to a Dutch KNIL soldier and a Balinese mother.

== Career ==
Stom played as a defender for Velocitas Breda and HFC Haarlem. He earned nine caps for the Netherlands national team between 1905 and 1908.
