= Pierre-Joseph Destrebecq =

Belgian footballer

Personal information
- Full name: Pierre-Joseph Destrebecq
- Date of birth: 18 June 1881
- Date of death: 7 December 1945 (aged 64)
- Position: Forward

Senior career*
Years	Team	Apps	(Gls)
1899–1901	US Bruxelloise	–	(–)
1901–1906	Union Saint-Gilloise	63	(24)
1906–1908	RC Bruxelles	18	(6)
1910–1911	RSC Anderlecht	19	(21)

International career
1904–1906	Belgium	7	(5)
- * Club domestic league appearances and goals

Pierre-Joseph Destrebecq (18 June 1881 – 7 December 1945) was a Belgian international football player. He played as striker in Union Saint-Gilloise, Racing Club de Bruxelles and Royal Sporting Club Anderlecht. With the national side, he also played the first official match of the Belgium national team against France on 1 May 1904. The encounter resulted in a 3–3 draw and Destrebecq scored once in this match. He scored 30 goals in 81 first division games.

== Palmares ==
- Belgium national team (7 selections, 5 goals scored)
- Champion of Belgium (4): in 1904, 1905 and 1906 with Union Saint-Gilloise and in 1908 with Racing Club de Bruxelles
