= Robert De Veen =

Belgian footballer and manager

Robert Deveen
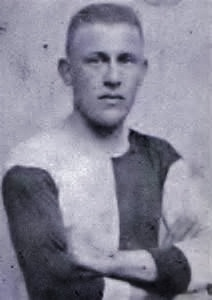

Personal information
- Full name: Louis Robert Deveen
- Date of birth: 25 March 1886
- Place of birth: Bruges, Belgium
- Date of death: 8 December 1939 (aged 53)
- Place of death: Bruges, Belgium
- Position: Striker

Senior career*
Years	Team	Apps	(Gls)
1904–1914	Club Brugge	196	(256)

International career
1906–1913	Belgium	23	(26)

Managerial career
- Racing de Tournai
- 1932–1934: Olympique Lillois
- 1934–1935: Lens
- 1938–1939: Club Brugge
- * Club domestic league appearances and goals

Robert Deveen, officially Louis Robert Deveen, (25 March 1886 in Bruges – 8 December 1939 in Bruges) was a Belgian football player and manager. He was born in Bruges.

He played for Club Brugge and Belgium, scoring 26 goals in just 23 caps, including 13 goals against France.

== Club career ==
Robert Deveen caused a stir as an unparalleled finisher during Club Brugge's pioneering years and as an international. He was the top scorer in the Belgian First Division in two back-to-back seasons in 1905 and 1906. During his years with Club Brugge he formed a successful and high-scoring attacking trio with Hector Goetinck and Charles Cambier. He played in the first team in Bruges from 1906 until the First World War, and was therefore not part of the club which was Belgian champion in 1920. With the outbreak of the First World War, Deveen ended his career as an active football player at the age of 28.

== International career ==
In 1907, after being the top scorer in Belgium for the second year in a row, De Veen was called up for the national team for the first time, making his debut at the age of 20 years and 26 days. On the occasion of his first selection, on 22 April 1906 against France in Paris, he scored 2 of Belgium's 5 goals. Seven days later against the Netherlands in Antwerp, he scored the first hat-trick in the history of Belgian football. He was particularly successful with France as he scored a total of 13 goals against them, including a 5-goal haul in a 7–1 win on 30 April 1911 in Brussels, although France was still playing without a coach while the Belgian team had already hired its first coach, the Scotsman William Maxwell, only in 1910.

His 26 goals for Belgium was the fourth-best international tally in Europe Pre-1920, only behind Vivian Woodward of England (29), Poul Nielsen of Denmark (40), and Imre Schlosser of Hungary (57).

== Managerial career ==
He first coached Racing de Tournai before leaving for the north of France, where he trained RC Lens, Olympique Lillois, and even AS Nancy, with excellent results. After his short period at Club, De Veen coached many small clubs in West Flanders. He ended his career at Club Brugge in the 1938-39 season. His two sons Bob and Florimond started playing football in youth at RC Doornik when he was a manager there.

== Career statistics ==
=== International goals ===
National team	Year	Apps	Goals
Belgium	1906	3	5
Belgium	1907	2	0
Belgium	1908	3	4
Belgium	1909	4	5
Belgium	1910	5	3
Belgium	1911	2	5
Belgium	1912	2	2
Belgium	1913	2	2
Total		23	26

Belgium score listed first, score column indicates score after each Robert Deveen goal.

List of international goals scored by Robert Deveen.
No.	Date	Venue	Opponent	Score	Result	Competition
1.	22 April 1906	Stade français à la Faisanderie, Saint-Cloud, France	France	4–0	5–0	Friendly match
2.	22 April 1906	Stade français à la Faisanderie, Saint-Cloud, France	France	5–0	5–0	Friendly match
3.	29 April 1906	Beerschot A.C. ground, Antwerp, Belgium	Netherlands	3–0	5–0	1906 Coupe Van den Abeele
4.	29 April 1906	Beerschot A.C. ground, Antwerp, Belgium	Netherlands	4–0	5–0	1906 Coupe Van den Abeele
5.	29 April 1906	Beerschot A.C. ground, Antwerp, Belgium	Netherlands	5–0	5–0	1906 Coupe Van den Abeele
6.	12 April 1908	Stade Olympique Yves-du-Manoir, Colombes, France	France	1–0	2–1	Friendly match
7.	12 April 1908	Stade Olympique Yves-du-Manoir, Colombes, France	France	2–0	2–1	Friendly match
8.	18 April 1908	Longchamps, Brussels, Belgium	England amateurs	1–3	2–8	Friendly match
9.	18 April 1908	Longchamps, Brussels, Belgium	England amateurs	2–4	2–8	Friendly match
10.	19 April 1909	White Hart Lane, London, England	England amateurs	1–4	2–11	Friendly match
11.	19 April 1909	White Hart Lane, London, England	England amateurs	2–10	2–11	Friendly match
12.	9 May 1909	Stade du Vivier d'Oie, Brussels, Belgium	France	1–0	5–2	Friendly match
13.	9 May 1909	Stade du Vivier d'Oie, Brussels, Belgium	France	2–0	5–2	Friendly match
14.	9 May 1909	Stade du Vivier d'Oie, Brussels, Belgium	France	3–1	5–2	Friendly match
15.	13 March 1910	Olympic Stadium, Antwerp, Belgium	Netherlands	1–0	3–2	1910 Coupe Van den Abeele
16.	13 March 1910	Olympic Stadium, Antwerp, Belgium	Netherlands	2–1	3–2	1910 Coupe Van den Abeele
17.	3 April 1910	Stade de la F.G.S.P.F., Gentilly, France	France	3–0	4–0	Friendly match
18.	30 April 1911	Rue de Forest, Brussels, Belgium	France	1–0	7–1	Friendly match
19.	30 April 1911	Rue de Forest, Brussels, Belgium	France	2–0	7–1	Friendly match
20.	30 April 1911	Rue de Forest, Brussels, Belgium	France	3–0	7–1	Friendly match
21.	30 April 1911	Rue de Forest, Brussels, Belgium	France	6–0	7–1	Friendly match
22.	30 April 1911	Rue de Forest, Brussels, Belgium	France	7–1	7–1	Friendly match
23.	20 February 1912	Stadion Broodstraat, Antwerp, Belgium	Switzerland	8–2	9–2	Friendly match
24.	20 February 1912	Stadion Broodstraat, Antwerp, Belgium	Switzerland	9–2	9–2	Friendly match
25.	9 March 1913	Olympic Stadium, Antwerp, Belgium	Netherlands	1–1	3–3	1913 Coupe Van den Abeele
26.	9 March 1913	Olympic Stadium, Antwerp, Belgium	Netherlands	2–1	3–3	1913 Coupe Van den Abeele

== Honours ==
=== Player ===
Club Brugge

- Belgian First Division:
  - Runner-up (3): 1905–06, 1909–10 and 1910–11

=== Manager ===
Olympique Lillois

- Ligue 1:
  - Winners (1): 1932–33
- Ligue 2:
  - Winners (1): 1936–37

=== Individual ===
Club Brugge

- Belgian Pro League top scorers: 1904–05 and 1905–06

=== Records ===
- All-time top goal scorer of Belgium with 10 goals from 29 April 1906 to 8 May 1938
