= Belgium national football team results (1904–1919) =

- Win Draw Loss

This is a list of the Belgium national team matches between 1905 and 1919.

However, throughout this period, they only played friendly matches. A substantial part of these can be considered to be part of minor tournaments, since friendly matches against the Netherlands were played for the Coupe Vanden Abeele during the matches in Belgium and the Rotterdamsch Nieuwsblad Beker, when the encounter took place in the Netherlands. Belgium also had their first international matches with France, Germany, Italy, Sweden, and Switzerland. Due to the First World War, no matches were played between 1915 and 1918.

Between their first match against France in 1904 and 1919, Belgium played in 47 matches, resulting in a negative balance of 24 losses against eighteen victories and five draws.

== Results ==
47 matches played:

1 May 1904 Évence Coppée Trophy	Belgium	3–3	France	Brussels, Belgium
16:30 (UTC+0:00)	Quéritet 7', 50'; Destrebecq 65'	Report	Mesnier 12'; Royet 13'; Cyprès 87'	Stadium: Stade du Vivier d'Oie; Attendance: 1,500; Referee: John C. Keene (England)

30 April 1905 1905 Coupe Vanden Abeele (Note: Coupe Vanden Abeele tournament (also known as Het Koperen Dingetje (The Little Thing of Copper)))	Belgium	1–4 (a.e.t.)	Netherlands	Antwerp, Belgium
14:30 (UTC+0:00)	Stom 86' (o.g.)	Report	de Neve 80', 106', 117', 119'	Stadium: Beerschot A.C. ground Attendance: 800; Referee: Frank König (Belgium)

7 May 1905 Friendly	Belgium	7–0	France	Brussels, Belgium
16:00 (UTC+0:00)	Van Hoorden 15', 70'; Destrebecq 19', 55', 86'; Theunen 30', 80'	Report		Stadium: Stade du Vivier d'Oie; Attendance: 300; Referee: Rodolphe Seeldrayers (Belgium); John Lewis (England)

14 May 1905 1905 Rotterdamsch Nieuwsblad Beker (Note: Rotterdamsch Nieuwsblad Beker tournament)	Netherlands	4–0	Belgium	Rotterdam, Netherlands
14:00 (UTC+0:20)	Hesselink 74' de Neve 76' (pen.), 84'; Lutjens 80'	Report		Stadium: Schuttersveld ground Attendance: 30,000; Referee: Henry Vermeulen (Netherlands)

22 April 1906 Friendly	France	0–5	Belgium	Saint-Cloud, France
15:30 (UTC+0:09)		Report	Feye 30', 35'; Van Hoorden 40'; De Veen 58', 60'	Stadium: Stade français à la Faisanderie; Attendance: 515; Referee: Jack Wood (France)

29 April 1906 1906 Coupe Vanden Abeele	Belgium	5–0	Netherlands	Antwerp, Belgium
14:30 (UTC+0:00)	Vanden Eynde 15'; Goetinck 40'; De Veen 52', 68', 80'	Report		Stadium: Beerschot A.C. ground Attendance: 2,000; Referee: Pat Harrower (England)

13 May 1906 1906 Rotterdamsch Nieuwsblad Beker	Netherlands	2–3	Belgium	Rotterdam, Netherlands
14:00 (UTC+0:20)	Muller 32'; Van der Vinne 54'	Report	Cambier 76', 88'; Destrebecq 81'	Stadium: Schuttersveld; Attendance: 7,000; Referee: Frank König (Belgium)

14 April 1907 1907 Coupe Vanden Abeele	Belgium	1–3 (a.e.t.)	Netherlands	Antwerp, Belgium
14:30 (UTC+0:00)	Feye 13'	Report	Van Gogh 74', 118'; Feith 99'	Stadium: Beerschot A.C. ground Attendance: 2,500; Referee: Pat Harrower (England)

21 April 1907 Friendly	Belgium	1–2	France	Brussels, Belgium
15:30	Cambier 18'	Report	Royet 41'; François 72'	Stadium: Stade du Vivier d'Oie; Attendance: 2,000; Referee: Herbert Willing (Netherlands)

9 May 1907 1907 Rotterdamsch Nieuwsblad Beker	Netherlands	1–2	Belgium	Haarlem, Netherlands
14:00 (UTC+0:20)	Feith 54'	Report	Feye 14'; Goetinck 60'	Stadium: De Hout; Attendance: 10,000; Referee: Ernest Holland (England)

29 March 1908 1908 Coupe Vanden Abeele	Belgium	1–4	Netherlands	Antwerp, Belgium
14:45 (UTC+0:00)	Vertongen 81'	Report	Ruffelse 12'; Thomée 50', 74'; De Korver 85'	Stadium: Beerschot A.C. ground Attendance: 2,000; Referee: Pat Harrower (England

12 April 1908 Friendly	France	1–2	Belgium	Colombes, France
15:00 (UTC+0:09)	Verlet 76' (pen.)	Report	De Veen 22', 34'	Stadium: Stade Olympique Yves-du-Manoir; Attendance: 498; Referee: John Stark (Scotland)

18 April 1908 Friendly	Belgium	2–8	England Amateur	Brussels, Belgium
	De Veen 28', 46'	Report	Purnell 4', 83'; Stapley 11', 24', 85'; Woodward 39', 66', 76'	Stadium: Longchamps; Attendance: 4,000; Referee: Bill Dijxhoorn (Netherlands)
Note: Some sources attribute Woodward's first and third goals to Robert Hustin (own goal) and Harold Hardman.

26 April 1908 1908 Rotterdamsch Nieuwsblad Beker	Netherlands	3–1	Belgium	Rotterdam, Netherlands
14:00 (UTC+0:20)	Snethlage 17'; Stapley 36' (pen.), 63' (pen.)	Report	Saeys 90'	Stadium: Prinsenlaan; Attendance: 6,000; Referee: Jack Howcroft (England)

26 October 1908 Friendly	Belgium	2–1	Sweden	Brussels, Belgium
15:00 (UTC+0:00)	Kevorkian 30'; Goossens 31'	Report	Ohlsson 39'	Stadium: Vivier d´Oie; Attendance: 800; Referee: Charles Barette (Belgium)

21 March 1909 1909 Coupe Vanden Abeele	Belgium	1–4	Netherlands	Antwerp, Belgium
14:45 (UTC+0:00)	Poelmans 63'	Report	Snethlage 11'; Kessler 19'; Welcker 38'; Lutjens 79'	Stadium: Beerschot A.C. ground Attendance: 6,000; Referee: Thomas Kyle (England)

17 April 1909 Friendly	England Amateur	11–2	Belgium	London, England
	Woodward ?'; Dunning ?', ?', ?', ?'; Chapman ?'; Raine ?'; H. Stapley ?', ?', ?'	Report	De Veen 35', 70'	Stadium: White Hart Lane; Attendance: 4,000; Referee: Christiaan Groothoff (Netherlands)

25 April 1909 1909 Rotterdamsch Nieuwsblad Beker	Netherlands	4–1	Belgium	Rotterdam, Netherlands
14:30 (UTC+0:20)	Lutjens 2'; Snethlage 21', 32', 54'	Report	Goossens 58'	Stadium: Prinsenlaan; Attendance: 10,000; Referee: Jack Howcroft (England)

9 May 1909 Friendly	Belgium	5–2	France	Brussels, Belgium
15:30 (UTC+0:00)	De Veen 30', 41', 80'; Van Hoorden 83'; Theunen 85'	Report	Mouton 60'; Rigal 83'	Stadium: Stade du Vivier d'Oie; Attendance: 1,500; Referee: Dicky Schumacher (England)

13 March 1910 1910 Coupe Vanden Abeele	Belgium	3–2 (a.e.t.)	Netherlands	Antwerp, Belgium
	De Veen 19', 24'; Six 119'	Report	Lutjens 21'; Kessler 26'	Stadium: Olympic Stadium; Attendance: 8,500; Referee: James Schumacher (England)

26 March 1910 Friendly	Belgium	2–2	England Amateur	Brussels, Belgium
	Six 23'; Paternoster 25'	Report	Owen; Porter	Stadium: Longchamps; Attendance: 4,000; Referee: Christiaan Groothoff (Netherlands)

3 April 1910 Friendly	France	0–4	Belgium	Gentilly, France
		Report	Six 27', 70', 85'; De Veen 73'	Stadium: Stade de la F.G.S.P.F. Attendance: 956; Referee: James Stark (Scotland)

10 April 1910 1910 Rotterdamsch Nieuwsblad Beker	Netherlands	7–0	Belgium	Haarlem, Netherlands
	Welcker 10', 28'; M. Francken 15', 45', 62'; Thomée 55', 80'	Report		Stadium: De Hout; Referee: John Howcroft (England)

16 May 1910 Friendly	Germany	0–3	Belgium	Duisburg, Germany
		Report	Saeys 20', 48'; Van Staceghem 75'	Stadium: Platz des Duisburger Spielverein, am Grunewald; Referee: Herbert Willing (Netherlands)

4 March 1911 Friendly	England Amateur	4–0	Belgium	London, England
	Poelmans 2', o.g.' Webb 20', 23'; Woodward 55'	Report		Stadium: Crystal Palace; Attendance: 4,000; Referee: Christiaan Groothoff (Netherlands)

19 March 1911 1911 Coupe Vanden Abeele	Belgium	1–5	Netherlands	Antwerp, Belgium
	Paternoster 78'	Report	M. Francken 8', 36', 55'; Thomée 83'; Welcker 88'	Stadium: Olympic Stadium; Attendance: 12,000; Referee: Thomas Campbell (England)

2 April 1911 1911 Rotterdamsch Nieuwsblad Beker	Netherlands	3–1	Belgium	Dordrecht, Netherlands
	M. Francken 28', 76'; Van Breda 29'	Report	Six 36'	Stadium: D.F.C.-terrein aan de Markettenweg; Attendance: 9,000; Referee: George Miller (England)

23 April 1911 Friendly	Belgium	2–1	Germany	Liège, Belgium
	Van Houtte 32'; Saeys 85'	Report	Förderer 50'	Stadium: Cointe; Attendance: 3,000; Referee: James Schumacher (England)

30 April 1911 Friendly	Belgium	7–1	France	Brussels, Belgium
	De Veen 20', 38', 42', 67', 86'; Saeys 48'; Maës 75'	Report	Bouttiau 60'	Stadium: Rue de Forest; Attendance: 3,000; Referee: James Stark (Scotland)

28 January 1912 Friendly	France	1–1	Belgium	Saint-Ouen, France
	Hubin 89' (pen.)	Report	Maës 86'	Stadium: Stade de Paris; Attendance: 1,980; Referee: James Stark (Scotland)

20 February 1912 Friendly	Belgium	9–2	Switzerland	Antwerp, Belgium
	Van Cant 4', 11'; Saeys 22', 41', 67'; Six 39', 42'; De Veen 80', 83'	Report	Weiss 61', pen.' Wyss 77'	Stadium: Stadion Broodstraat; Attendance: 3,000; Referee: Paul Schröder (Germany)

10 March 1912 1912 Coupe Vanden Abeele	Belgium	1–2	Netherlands	Antwerp, Belgium
	Nisot 60'	Report	Thomée 58', 72'	Stadium: Olympic Stadium; Attendance: 9,225; Referee: Charles Crisp (England)

8 April 1912 Friendly	Belgium	1–2	England Amateur	Brussels, Belgium
	Nisot 32'	Report	Bailey 30', 48'	Stadium: Longchamps; Attendance: 5,000; Referee: Paul Schröder (Germany)
Note: Fernand Nisot, the scorer of Belgium's equaliser, was only sixteen years old.

28 April 1912 1912 Rotterdamsch Nieuwsblad Beker	Netherlands	4–3	Belgium	Dordrecht, Netherlands
	Van Berckel 1'; M. Francken 2', 20', 62'	Report	Musch 27'; Nisot 43', 56'	Stadium: D.F.C.-terrein aan de Markettenweg; Attendance: 10,000; Referee: John Pearson (England)

9 November 1912 Friendly	England Amateur	4–0	Belgium	Swindon, England
	Woodward 10', 40'; Healey 15'; Wright 25'	Report		Stadium: County Ground; Attendance: 6,624; Referee: William Nunnerley (Wales)

16 February 1913 Friendly	Belgium	3–0	France	Brussels, Belgium
	Nisot 21', 31'; Bessems 52'	Report		Stadium: Stade du Vivier d'Oie; Attendance: 6,000; Referee: James Schumacher (England)

9 March 1913 1913 Coupe Vanden Abeele	Belgium	3–3	Netherlands	Antwerp, Belgium
	De Veen 17', 29'; Nisot 30'	Report	Bosschart 1'; Haak 44'; M. Francken 63'	Stadium: Olympic Stadium; Attendance: 12,000; Referee: Frederick Kirkham (England)

20 April 1913 1913 Rotterdamsch Nieuwsblad Beker	Netherlands	2–4	Belgium	Zwolle, Netherlands
	Bouvy 35' (pen.); De Groot 55'	Report	Suetens 2'; Musch 20', 40'; Nisot 36'	Stadium: Zwolsche Atletische Club Stadion; Attendance: 12,000; Referee: John Baily (England)

1 May 1913 Friendly	Italy	1–0	Belgium	Turin, Italy
	Ara 57'	Report		Stadium: Campo di Piazza d`Armi; Attendance: 6,000; Referee: Henry Goodley (England)

4 May 1913 Friendly	Switzerland	1–2	Belgium	Basel, Switzerland
	Marki 85'	Report	Brébart 30'; Saeys 80'	Stadium: Stadion Landhof; Attendance: 5,000; Referee: Walter Sanß (Germany)

2 November 1913 Friendly	Belgium	2–0	Switzerland	Verviers, Belgium
	Wertz 26'; Nisot 85'	Report		Stadium: Stade du Panorama; Attendance: 6,000; Referee: Willem Eymers (Netherlands)

23 November 1913 Friendly	Belgium	6–2	Germany	Antwerp, Belgium
	Brébart 16', 41', 63'; Van Cant 27', 28', 87'	Report	Wegele 55'; Fuchs 67'	Stadium: Stadion Broodstraat; Attendance: 6,500; Referee: Albert Meerum-Terwogt (Netherlands)

25 January 1914 Friendly	France	4–3	Belgium	Lille, France
	Hanot 16' (pen.); Bard 24'; Jourde 37'; Dubly 65'	Report	Van Cant 6'; Brébart 8'; Thys 41'	Stadium: Stade Victor Boucquey; Attendance: 4,813; Referee: Herbert Mortimer (England)

24 February 1914 Friendly	Belgium	1–8	England Amateur	Brussels, Belgium
	Brébart 6'	Report	Moore; Sharpe; Louch; Woodward	Stadium: Longchamps; Attendance: 10,000; Referee: Fernand Jenicot (France)

15 March 1914 1914 Coupe Vanden Abeele	Belgium	2–4	Netherlands	Antwerp, Belgium
	Brébart 18' (pen.)	Report	Kessler 32', 74'; Westra 63'; J. Francken 80'	Stadium: Olympic Stadium; Attendance: 20,000; Referee: James Schumacher (England)

26 April 1914 1914 Rotterdamsch Nieuwsblad Beker	Netherlands	4–2	Belgium	Amsterdam, Netherlands
	Buitenweg 15', 81'; Vos 24'; Kessler 62'	Report	Van Cant 37'; Nisot 40'	Stadium: Het Nederlandsche Sportpark; Attendance: 28,282; Referee: John Pearson (England)

9 March 1919 Friendly	Belgium	2–2	France	Brussels, Belgium
	Michel 5'; Gamblin 75' (o.g.)	Report	Hanot 80', 89'	Stadium: Stade du Vivier d'Oie; Attendance: 25,000; Referee: Christiaan Groothoff (Netherlands)

== See also ==
- Belgium national football team results
