= List of Club Brugge KV seasons =

Club Brugge KV is a football club based in Bruges in Belgium. It was founded in 1891 and is one of the top clubs in Belgium.

== Seasons ==
Season	Division				Competition	Points	Notes	Belgian Cup	Europe	Belgian Super Cup
Season	I	II	III	IV	Competition	Points	Notes	Belgian Cup	Europe	Belgian Super Cup
1895–96	6				Championship Cup	11				
1896–97							Did not play			
1897–98							Did not play			
1898–99	2				Championship Cup		Lost in championship final to FC Liégeois			
1899–1900	2				Championship Cup	12	Lost in championship final to Racing Club de Bruxelles			
1900–01	8				Division of Honour	8				
1901–02	6				Division of Honour	2				
1902–03	5				Division of Honour	4				
1903–04	3				Division of Honour	4	3rd of 4 teams in final round			
1904–05	3				Division of Honour	28				
1905–06	2				Division of Honour	29				
1906–07	3				Division of Honour	24				
1907–08	3				Division of Honour	26				
1908–09	3				Division of Honour	33				
1909–10	2				Division of Honour	38	Lost championship final to Union SG			
1910–11	2				Division of Honour	34				
1911–12	4				Division of Honour	29		1/4		
1912–13	7				Division of Honour	19		1/8		
1913–14	4				Division of Honour	27		fin		
1914–15							WWI			
1915–16							WWI			
1916–17							WWI			
1917–18							WWI			
1918–19							WWI			
1919–20					Division of Honour	34				
1920–21	4				Division of Honour	26				
1921–22	9				Division of Honour	25				
1922–23	8				Division of Honour	23				
1923–24	9				Division of Honour	23				
1924–25	11				Division of Honour	21				
1925–26	10				Division of Honour	25				
1926–27	8				Division of Honour	26		R1		
1927–28	13 ↓				Division of Honour	22				
1928–29		1 ↑			First Division	43				
1929–30	6				Division of Honour	27				
1930–31	5				Division of Honour	29				
1931–32	11				Division of Honour	24				
1932–33	13 ↓				Division of Honour	16				
1933–34		3			First Division	34				
1934–35		1 ↑			First Division	40				
1935–36	9				Division of Honour	23				
1936–37	10				Division of Honour	25				
1937–38	5				Division of Honour	27				
1938–39	14				Division of Honour	17				
1939–40							WWII			
1940–41	9 ↓				Division of Honour B	5	War competition, divided in 2 geographical series			
1941–42		3			First Division	36				
1942–43		2			First Division	43				
1943–44		3			First Division	42				
1944–45							WWII			
1945–46		1 ↑			First Division	53				
1946–47	19 ↓				Division of Honour	22				
1947–48		4			First Division	38				
1948–49		1 ↑			First Division	49				
1949–50	14				Division of Honour	22				
1950–51	16 ↓				Division of Honour	21				
1951–52		2			First Division	42				
1952–53		8			Second Division	30				
1953–54		12			Second Division	29		1/8		
1954–55		3			Second Division	38		1/4		
1955–56		6			Second Division	32		1/16		
1956–57		10			Second Division	28				
1957–58		5			Second Division	34				
1958–59		2 ↑			Second Division	39				
1959–60	13				First Division	26				
1960–61	8				First Division	29				
1961–62	5				First Division	35				
1962–63	8				First Division	30				
1963–64	12				First Division	24		1/8		
1964–65	9				First Division	28		1/16		
1965–66	5				First Division	35		1/16		
1966–67	2				First Division	45		1/8		
1967–68	2				First Division	45		win	ICFC: I	
1968–69	5				First Division	35		1/8	EC2: I	
1969–70	2				First Division	45		win	ICFC: II	
1970–71	2				First Division	46		1/16	EC2: 1/4	
1971–72	2				First Division	45		1/16	EC3: I	
1972–73					First Division	45		1/16	EC3: II	
1973–74	5				First Division	32		1/16	EC1: II	
1974–75	4				First Division	49		1/16		
1975–76					First Division	52		1/2	EC3: fin	
1976–77					First Division	52		win	EC1: 1/4	
1977–78					First Division	51		1/2	EC1: fin	
1978–79	6				First Division	38		fin	EC1: I	
1979–80					First Division	53		1/4		
1980–81	6				First Division	37		1/8	EC1: I	winner
1981–82	15				First Division	28		1/16	EC3: I	
1982–83	5				First Division	43		fin		
1983–84	3				First Division	44		1/8		
1984–85	2				First Division	48		1/8	EC3: II	
1985–86	2				First Division	52	Play-offs ended with 1–1 in Anderlecht and 2–2 in Bruges	win	EC3: II	
1986–87	3				First Division	45		1/8	EC2: I	winner
1987–88					First Division	51		1/4	EC3: 1/2	
1988–89	4				First Division	43		1/4	EC3: II	winner
1989–90					First Division	57		1/16	EC2: II	
1990–91	4				First Division	47		win	EC1: II	winner
1991–92					First Division	53		1/8	EC2: 1/2	winner
1992–93	6				First Division	40		1/8	CL: P	winner
1993–94	2				First Division	53		fin		
1994–95	3				First Division	49		win	EC2: 1/4	winner
1995–96					First Division	81		win	EC2: II	runner-up
1996–97	2				First Division	71		1/16	EC3: III	winner
1997–98					First Division	84		fin	EC3: II	
1998–99	2				First Division	71		1/16	EC3: III	winner
1999–2000	2				First Division	67		1/16	UC: I	
2000–01	2				First Division	78		1/16	UC: III	
2001–02	2				First Division	70		win	UC: III	
2002–03					First Division	79		1/4	CL+UC: III	winner
2003–04	2				First Division	72		win	CL+UC: IV	winner
2004–05					First Division	79		fin	UC: P	winner
2005–06	3				First Division	64		1/16	CL+UC: III	winner
2006–07	6				First Division	51		win	UC: P	
2007–08	3				First Division	67		1/8	UC: I	runner-up
2008–09	3				First Division	59		1/8	UC: P	
2009–10	3				First Division	41		1/4	EL: II	
2010–11	4				First Division	43		1/8	EL: P	
2011–12	2				First Division	48		1/8	EL: II	
2012–13	3				First Division	46		1/8	EL: I	
2013–14	3				First Division	48		1/8	EL: 3Q	
2014–15	2				First Division	47		win	EL: 1/4	
2015–16					First Division	54		fin	EL: I	runner-up
	1A	1B	1Am	2Am			From 2016 to 2017: 1A, 1B, 1Am, 2Am	Cup	Europe	Super Cup
2016–17	2				First Division A	45		1/8	CL: I	winner
2017–18					First Division A	46		1/2	EL: P	
2018–19	2				First Division A	50		1/16	CL+EL: 1/16	winner
2019–20					First Division A	70	Competition ended after 29 matches due to COVID-19 pandemic in Belgium	fin	CL+EL: 1/16	
2020–21					First Division A	44		1/4	CL+EL: 1/16	N/P
2021–22					First Division A	50		1/2	CL: I	winner
2022–23	4				First Division A	36		1/8	CL: 1/16	winner
2023–24					First Division A	50		1/2	ECL: 1/2	
2024–25	2				First Division A	53		win	CL: 1/16	runner-up
2025–26					First Division A	50		1/4	CL: Knockout phase play-offs	winner

== List of Club Brugge KV seasonpages ==
- 2003–04 Club Brugge KV season
- 2006–07 Club Brugge KV season
- 2013–14 Club Brugge KV season
- 2014–15 Club Brugge KV season
- 2015–16 Club Brugge KV season
- 2017–18 Club Brugge KV season
- 2018–19 Club Brugge KV season
- 2019–20 Club Brugge KV season
- 2020–21 Club Brugge KV season
- 2021–22 Club Brugge KV season
- 2022–23 Club Brugge KV season
- 2023–24 Club Brugge KV season
- 2024–25 Club Brugge KV season
