= 1913–14 in Belgian football =

Football in Belgium
- Season: 1913–14

The 1913–14 season was the 19th season of competitive football in Belgium.

== Overview ==
Daring Club de Bruxelles won the Division I. A test match was organised between newcomer A.A. La Gantoise and Standard Club Liégois as both teams ended the season with 13 points at the 10th place. Standard lost the match and was relegated to the Promotion. The other team to be relegated was Léopold Club de Bruxelles. After that season, football was stopped due to World War I. The competitions resumed in 1919.

== National team ==
Date	Venue	Opponents	Score*	Comp	Belgium scorers	Match Report
November 2, 1913	Verviers (H)	Switzerland	2-0	F	Fernand Wertz, Fernand Nisot	FA website
November 23, 1913	Olympisch Stadion, Antwerp (H)	Germany	6-2	F	Sylvain Brebart (3), Jean Van Cant (3)	FA website
January 25, 1914	Lille (A)	France	3-4	F	Jean Van Cant, Sylvain Brebart, Joseph Thys	FA website
February 24, 1914	Vélodrome de Longchamps, Brussels (H)	England amateur	1-8	F	Sylvain Brebart	FA website
March 15, 1914	Olympisch Stadion, Antwerp (H)	The Netherlands	2-4	F	Sylvain Brebart (2)	FA website
April 26, 1914	Sportpark, Amsterdam (A)	The Netherlands	2-4	F	Jean Van Cant, Fernand Nisot	FA website

* Belgium score given first

Key

- H = Home match
- A = Away match
- N = On neutral ground
- F = Friendly
- o.g. = own goal

== Honours ==
Competition	Winner
Division I	Daring Club de Bruxelles
Promotion	Uccle Sport
Cup	Union Saint-Gilloise

== Final league tables ==
=== Promotion ===
Pos	Team	Pld	Won	Drw	Lst	GF	GA	Pts	GD	Notes
1	Uccle Sport	22	18	1	3	68	20	37	+48	Promoted to First Division.
2	RC de Malines	22	15	5	2	75	19	35	+56	Promoted to First Division.
3	FC Malinois	22	11	5	6	63	30	27	+33	
4	SC Anderlechtois	22	13	1	8	42	31	27	+11	
5	Tilleur FC	22	8	4	10	52	48	20	+4	
6	FC Liégeois	22	8	4	10	49	45	20	+4	
7	Stade Louvaniste	22	8	4	10	37	45	20	-8	
8	FC de Bressoux	22	6	7	9	26	42	19	-16	
9	SC Courtraisien	22	8	3	11	34	55	19	-21	
10	EFC Hasselt	22	5	7	10	16	44	17	-28	
11	TSV Lyra	22	7	3	12	32	67	17	-35	
12	ESC de Bruxelles	22	4	1	17	24	78	9	-54	
