= Guillaume Van Den Eynde =

Belgian footballer

- Van Den Eynde with Union SG in 1904

Personal information
- Full name: Guillaume Isaac Van Den Eynde
- Date of birth: 12 October 1884
- Place of birth: Brussels, Belgium
- Date of death: 19 October 1948 (aged 64)
- Position: Defender

Senior career*
| Years | Team | Apps | (Gls) |
| 1901–1912 | Union SG | 140 | (19) |

International career
| 1904–1912 | Belgium | 13 | (1) |
- * Club domestic league appearances and goals

Guillaume Isaac Van Den Eynde (12 October 1884 – 19 October 1948) was a Belgian footballer. He played in 13 matches for the Belgium national football team from 1904 to 1912.

== Career ==
He was a defender before the First World War, playing for Brussels-based club Union Saint-Gilloise, with whom he won six Belgian First Division titles. On 7 May 1910, however, Van Den Eynde committed a serious foul during a match of the Tournoi International de l'Exposition in Brussels. It caused a double fracture of the leg of Club Brugge midfielder Charles Cambier. He was suspended for life when he was only 26 years old, by the Belgian federation, the URBSFA. His suspension was eventually lifted in 1912. In total, he played 140 matches in the First Division and scored 19 goals.

He played 13 matches and scored one goal with the Red Devils, including Belgium's first official match on 1 May 1904 in Brussels against France, a 3–3 draw.

== Honours ==
Union SG

- Belgian First Division: 1903–04, 1904–05, 1905–06, 1906–07, 1908–09, 1909–10
