= 1912–13 in Belgian football =

Football in Belgium
- Season: 1910–11

The 1912–13 season was the 18th season of competitive football in Belgium.

== Overview ==
Union Saint-Gilloise won the first ever "double" in Belgian football history by winning the Division I (in a test match against holder Daring Club de Bruxelles) as well as the second edition of the Belgian Cup.

== National team ==
Date	Venue	Opponents	Score*	Comp	Belgium scorers	Match Report
November 9, 1912	County Ground, Swindon (N)	England amateur	0–4	F		FA website
February 16, 1913	Stade du Vivier d'Oie, Brussels (H)	France	3–0	F	Fernand Nisot (2), Louis Bessems	FA website
March 9, 1913	Olympisch Stadion, Antwerp (H)	The Netherlands	3–3	F	Robert De Veen (2), Fernand Nisot	FA website
April 20, 1913	Zwolle (A)	The Netherlands	4–2	F	Jules Suetens, Joseph Musch (2), Fernand Nisot	FA website
May 1, 1913	Turin (A)	Italy	0–1	F		FA website
May 4, 1913	Bâle (A)	Switzerland	2–1	F	Sylvain Brebart, Louis Saeys	FA website

* Belgium score given first

Key

- H = Home match
- A = Away match
- N = On neutral ground
- F = Friendly
- o.g. = own goal

== Honours ==
Competition	Winner
Division I	Union Saint-Gilloise
Promotion	A.A. La Gantoise
Cup	Union Saint-Gilloise

== Final league tables ==
=== Promotion ===
Pos	Team	Pld	Won	Drw	Lst	GF	GA	Pts	GD	Notes
1	AA La Gantoise	22	16	5	1	64	16	37	+48	Promoted to First Division.
2	Léopold Club de Bruxelles	22	17	1	4	97	24	35	+73	Promoted to First Division.
3	FC Malinois	22	12	7	3	39	21	31	+18	
4	RC de Malines	22	13	3	6	63	27	29	+36	
5	Uccle Sport	22	10	3	9	53	39	23	+14	
6	FC de Bressoux	22	7	5	10	34	33	19	+1	
7	SC Courtraisien	22	8	3	11	38	52	19	−14	
8	Tilleur FC	22	7	5	10	34	56	19	−22	
9	EFC Hasselt	22	6	4	12	28	49	16	−21	
10	Stade Louvaniste	22	6	4	12	25	58	16	−33	
11	US Tournaisienne	22	4	4	14	33	64	12	−31	
12	FC L'Avenir Hasselt	22	3	2	17	20	89	8	−69	
