= 1908–09 in Belgian football =

Football in Belgium
- Season: 1908–09

The 1908–09 season was the 14th competitive season in Belgian football.

== Overview ==
At the end of the season RC Gantois was relegated to the second division and replaced by Standard FC Liégeois.

== National team ==
Date	Venue	Opponents	Score*	Comp	Belgium scorers	Match Report
October 26, 1908	Stade du Vivier d'Oie, Brussels (H)	Sweden	2-1	F	Vahram Kevorkian, Fernand Goossens	FA website
March 21, 1909	Olympisch Stadion, Antwerp (H)	The Netherlands	1–4	F	Edgard Poelmans	FA website
April 17, 1909	White Hart Lane, London (N)	England amateur	2-11	F	Robert De Veen (2)	FA website
April 25, 1909	Schuttersveld, Rotterdam (A)	The Netherlands	1-4	F	Fernand Goossens	FA website
May 9, 1909	Stade du Vivier d'Oie, Brussels (H)	France	5-2	F	Robert De Veen (3), Camille Van Hoorden, Laurent Theunen	FA website

* Belgium score given first

Key

- H = Home match
- A = Away match
- N = Match on neutral ground
- F = Friendly
- o.g. = own goal

== Honours ==
Competition	Winner
Division I	Union Saint-Gilloise
Promotion	Standard FC Liégeois

== Final league tables ==
=== Promotion ===
In the first stage of the Promotion, 5 provincial leagues were played, with 9 clubs qualifying for the final round:

- For Antwerp, RC de Malines (winner) and AS Anversoise (runner-up)
- For West and East Flanders, AA La Gantoise (winner) and FC Brugeois II (runner-up)
- For Liège, Standard FC Liégeois (winner) and SC de Theux (runner-up)
- For Brabant, Athletic and Running Club de Bruxelles (winner) and Daring Club de Bruxelles II (runner-up)
- For Hainaut and Namur, CS Montois (winner)

Pos	Team	Pld	Won	Drw	Lst	GF	GA	Pts	GD	Notes
1	Standard FC Liégeois	16	12	2	2	46	16	26	+30	Promoted to First Division.
2	Daring Club de Bruxelles II	16	11	2	3	49	25	24	+24	
3	RC de Malines	16	10	2	4	52	26	22	+26	
4	FC Brugeois II	16	10	1	5	49	27	21	+22	
5	AA La Gantoise	16	10	1	5	41	27	21	+14	
6	Athletic and Running Club de Bruxelles	16	5	1	10	34	38	11	-4	
7	SC de Theux	22	9	4	9	41	40	22	+1	
8	AS Anversoise	22	7	1	14	48	57	15	-9	
9	CS Montois	22	5	3	14	27	86	13	-59	
