= 1912–13 Belgian First Division =

18th season of top-tier football in Belgium

Belgian First Division
- Season: 1912–13

Statistics of Belgian First Division in the 1912–13 season.

== Overview ==
Location of teams in Belgian First Division 1912–13

It was contested by 12 teams, and Union Saint-Gilloise won the championship.

== League standings ==
| Pos | Team | Pld | W | D | L | GF | GA | GD | Pts | Qualification or relegation |
|---|---|---|---|---|---|---|---|---|---|---|
| 1 | Union Saint-Gilloise | 22 | 18 | 2 | 2 | 82 | 19 | +63 | 38 | Championship play-off |
| 2 | Daring Club de Bruxelles | 22 | 18 | 2 | 2 | 82 | 12 | +70 | 38 | Championship play-off |
| 3 | Racing Club de Bruxelles | 22 | 13 | 5 | 4 | 61 | 23 | +38 | 31 | |
| 4 | Beerschot | 22 | 10 | 7 | 5 | 52 | 32 | +20 | 27 | |
| 5 | C.S. Brugeois | 22 | 11 | 3 | 8 | 48 | 29 | +19 | 25 | |
| 6 | C.S. Verviétois | 22 | 8 | 4 | 10 | 49 | 47 | +2 | 20 | |
| 7 | F.C. Brugeois | 22 | 9 | 1 | 12 | 41 | 46 | −5 | 19 | |
| 8 | R.C. Gantois | 22 | 6 | 7 | 9 | 31 | 36 | −5 | 19 | |
| 9 | Antwerp F.C. | 22 | 8 | 3 | 11 | 39 | 57 | −18 | 19 | |
| 10 | Standard Club Liégeois | 22 | 6 | 5 | 11 | 24 | 66 | −42 | 17 | |
| 11 | F.C. Liégeois | 22 | 4 | 1 | 17 | 15 | 88 | −73 | 9 | Relegated to Promotion Division |
| 12 | Excelsior S.C. de Bruxelles | 22 | 0 | 2 | 20 | 11 | 84 | −73 | 2 | Relegated to Promotion Division |

== Results ==
| Home \ Away | ANT | BEE | CSB | FCB | DAR | EXC | RCB | USG | GAN | FCL | STA | VER |
|---|---|---|---|---|---|---|---|---|---|---|---|---|
| Antwerp | | 2–1 | 2–4 | 1–0 | 1–2 | 5–0 | 2–2 | 0–3 | 4–1 | 3–1 | 6–1 | 0–3 |
| Beerschot | 1–1 | | 2–1 | 3–2 | 1–0 | 8–0 | 1–1 | 4–4 | 4–1 | 7–1 | 2–2 | 3–2 |
| CS Brugeois | 7–0 | 1–3 | | 2–0 | 0–1 | 4–0 | 0–1 | 0–2 | 0–0 | 6–1 | 5–0 | 2–2 |
| FC Brugeois | 6–0 | 0–3 | 2–1 | | 3–3 | 3–2 | 2–4 | 1–0 | 1–0 | 7–0 | 1–3 | 2–3 |
| Daring Club | 5–0 | 2–1 | 4–1 | 5–0 | | 7–0 | 2–0 | 3–0 | 2–1 | 12–0 | 8–0 | 6–1 |
| Excelsior Bruxelles | 1–3 | 1–3 | 1–3 | 0–3 | 0–5 | | 1–6 | 0–3 | 0–2 | 0–2 | 1–1 | 2–4 |
| Racing Bruxelles | 2–2 | 3–0 | 0–2 | 3–1 | 1–1 | 5–0 | | 1–2 | 2–2 | 6–0 | 9–0 | 3–1 |
| Union SG | 4–1 | 4–2 | 6–0 | 6–2 | 2–1 | 4–0 | 2–1 | | 3–0 | 14–0 | 5–0 | 5–0 |
| Racing Gand | 3–2 | 2–2 | 1–2 | 3–1 | 0–1 | 0–0 | 0–4 | 1–1 | | 3–0 | 5–1 | 3–2 |
| RFC Liège | 1–2 | 1–0 | 0–5 | 1–2 | 0–6 | 3–1 | 0–1 | 0–3 | 1–1 | | 1–3 | 2–1 |
| Standard Liège | 4–1 | 0–0 | 0–1 | 2–0 | 0–3 | 4–1 | 0–2 | 0–4 | 2–2 | 1–0 | | 1–1 |
| Verviétois | 5–1 | 1–1 | 1–1 | 1–2 | 0–3 | 6–0 | 2–4 | 2–5 | 1–0 | 4–0 | 6–1 | |

Legend: Blue = home team win; Yellow = draw; Red = away team win.

== Championship play-off ==
| Team 1 | Score | Team 2 |
|---|---|---|
| Union Saint-Gilloise | 2-0 | Daring Club de Bruxelles |

== See also ==
- 1912–13 in Belgian football
