= 1904–05 in Belgian football =

Football in Belgium
- Season: 1904–05

The 1904–05 season was the tenth competitive season in Belgian football.

== Overview ==
Only one official division existed at the time. It was called Division I. The season was not completed.

Athletic and Running Club de Bruxelles withdrew at the end of the season.

== National team ==
Belgium won its first official game against France on 7 May 1905.

Date	Venue	Opponents	Score*	Comp	Belgium scorers	Match Report
30 April 1905	Olympisch Stadion, Antwerp (H)	The Netherlands	1–4	F	Stol Peet (o.g.)	FA website
7 May 1905	Stade du Vivier d'Oie, Brussels (H)	France	7–0	F	Camille Van Hoorden (2), Pierre-Joseph Destrebecq (3), Laurent Theunen (2)	FA website
14 May 1905	Schuttersveld, Rotterdam (A)	The Netherlands	0–4	F		FA website

* Belgium score given first

Key

- H = Home match
- A = Away match
- F = Friendly
- o.g. = own goal

== Honour ==
Competition	Winner
Division I	R. Union Saint-Gilloise

== League standings ==
Pos	Team	Pld	Won	Drw	Lst	GF	GA	Pts	GD	Notes
1	Union Saint-Gilloise	20	17	1	2	83	12	35	+71	
2	Racing Club de Bruxelles	20	13	4	3	76	25	30	+51	
3	F.C. Brugeois	20	13	2	5	63	26	28	+37	
4	F.C. Liégeois	20	13	1	6	48	29	27	+19	
5	Daring Club de Bruxelles	19	10	2	7	42	33	22	+9	
6	Beerschot	20	9	2	9	47	43	20	+4	
7	C.S. Verviétois	19	8	0	11	43	63	16	-20	
8	C.S. Brugeois	19	6	3	10	33	40	15	-7	
9	Léopold Club de Bruxelles	19	5	2	12	35	60	12	-25	
10	Antwerp F.C.	18	4	1	13	28	56	9	-28	
11	Athletic and Running Club de Bruxelles	20	0	0	20	5	116	0	-111	Not participating next season.
