= 1905–06 in Belgian football =

Football in Belgium
- Season: 1905–06

The 1905–06 season was the 11th competitive season in Belgian football.

== Overview ==
It is the first season with a relegation system due to the creation of the second division. Beerschot AC was relegated at the end of the season and replaced by second division qualifier SC Courtraisien.

== National team ==
Belgium won its first official game against France on 7 May 1905.

Date	Venue	Opponents	Score*	Comp	Belgium scorers	Match Report
22 April 1906	La Faisanderie, Saint-Cloud (A)	France	5–0	F	René Feye (2), Camille Van Hoorden, Robert De Veen (2)	FA website
29 April 1906	Olympisch Stadion, Antwerp (H)	The Netherlands	5–0	F	Guillaume Van Den Eynde, Hector Goetinck, Robert De Veen (3)	FA website
13 May 1906	Schuttersveld, Rotterdam (A)	The Netherlands	3-2	F	Charles Cambier (2), Pierre-Joseph Destrebecq	FA website

* Belgium score given first

Key

- H = Home match
- A = Away match
- F = Friendly
- o.g. = own goal

== Honours ==
Competition	Winner
Division I	Union Saint-Gilloise
Promotion	Union Saint-Gilloise II

== Final league tables ==
=== Promotion ===
In the first phase of the championship, 4 provincial leagues were played, with the following qualifiers for the final round:

- For Brabant, Union Saint-Gilloise II (winner) and RC de Bruxelles II (runner-up)
- For East Flanders and Antwerp, RC de Gand
- For West Flanders, SC Courtraisien
- For Liège, Standard FC Liégeois

Pos	Team	Pld	Won	Drw	Lst	GF	GA	Pts	GD	Notes
1	Union Saint-Gilloise II	8	6	1	1	33	10	13	+23	Unable to be promoted as a Reserve side.
2	SC Courtraisien	8	5	1	2	22	15	11	+7	Promoted to First Division.
3	Standard FC Liégeois	8	3	1	4	14	18	7	-4	
4	RC de Bruxelles II	8	3	1	4	20	28	7	-8	
5	RC de Gand	8	1	0	7	9	27	2	-18	
