= 1910–11 Belgian First Division =

16th season of top-tier football in Belgium

Belgian First Division
- Season: 1910–11

Statistics of Belgian First Division in the 1910–11 season.

== Overview ==
Location of teams in Belgian First Division 1910–11

It was contested by 12 teams, and C.S. Brugeois won the championship.

== League standings ==
Pos	Team	Pld	W	D	L	GF	GA	GD	Pts	Relegation
1	C.S. Brugeois	21	16	2	3	76	24	+52	34	
2	F.C. Brugeois	21	16	1	4	70	27	+43	33	
3	Daring Club de Bruxelles	22	12	3	7	52	33	+19	27	
4	Union Saint-Gilloise	22	12	3	7	55	36	+19	27	
5	Racing Club de Bruxelles	22	11	2	9	52	42	+10	24	
6	Beerschot	22	9	5	8	55	45	+10	23	
7	Antwerp F.C.	22	9	3	10	43	46	−3	21	
8	R.C. Malines	22	8	2	12	39	59	−20	18	
9	Léopold Club de Bruxelles	22	6	6	10	36	62	−26	18	
10	Excelsior S.C. de Bruxelles	22	6	4	12	36	60	−24	16	
11	Standard Club Liégeois	22	5	4	13	32	48	−16	14	
12	S.C. Courtraisien	22	1	5	16	20	87	−67	7	Relegated to Promotion Division

== Results ==
Home \ Away	ANT	BEE	CSB	FCB	COU	DAR	EXC	LÉO	RCB	USG	RCM	STA
Antwerp		4–0	3–2	3–2	1–1	3–1	1–0	5–1	3–4	1–2	4–0	1–1
Beerschot	2–0		1–3	4–3	8–0	1–2	5–1	1–1	3–3	2–2	6–3	4–2
CS Brugeois	7–1	2–2		0–3	4–2	5–2	3–0	5–1	6–0	2–0	7–0	4–0
FC Brugeois	2–0	3–2	1–1		6–2	1–0	11–0	6–1	3–1	2–1	6–1	4–0
Courtraisien	0–0	2–3	0–0	0–3		2–2	1–2	1–2	1–0	2–3	2–4	0–5 (Note: Match awarded.)
Daring Club	4–1	2–1	1–0	2–3	5–0		2–1	4–0	1–3	2–0	3–2	8–0
Excelsior Bruxelles	3–0	2–2	1–2	2–1	6–1	2–2		6–1	2–2	0–5	2–2	2–0
Léopold	3–4	6–2	1–6	1–1	1–1	2–1	2–1		1–6	3–2	4–0	0–0
Racing Bruxelles	3–1	2–1	1–3	2–5	8–2	2–3	2–1	5–1		1–2	3–1	2–0
Union SG	2–5	2–0	2–6	4–2	8–0	1–0	4–1	2–2	0–2		4–0	5–2
RC Malines	3–2	0–2	1–3	0–1	8–0	3–3	5–1	1–0	2–0	0–3		1–0
Standard Liège	3–1	0–3	1–5	0–1	8–0	0–2	6–0	2–2	1–0	1–1	0–2	

Legend: Blue = home team win; Yellow = draw; Red = away team win.

== See also ==
- 1910–11 in Belgian football
