= 1909–10 Belgian First Division =

15th season of top-tier football in Belgium

Belgian First Division
- Season: 1909–10

Statistics of Belgian First Division in the 1909–10 season.

== Overview ==
Location of teams in Belgian First Division 1909–10

It was contested by 12 teams, and Union Saint-Gilloise won the championship.

== League standings ==
Pos	Team	Pld	W	D	L	GF	GA	GD	Pts	Qualification or relegation
1	Union Saint-Gilloise	22	19	0	3	90	15	+75	38	Championship play-off
2	F.C. Brugeois	22	18	2	2	82	26	+56	38	Championship play-off
3	C.S. Brugeois	22	18	0	4	67	22	+45	36	
4	Daring Club de Bruxelles	22	11	3	8	47	33	+14	25	
5	Standard Club Liégeois	22	10	3	9	37	25	+12	23	
6	Beerschot	22	10	2	10	47	56	−9	22	
7	Excelsior S.C. de Bruxelles	22	8	3	11	48	44	+4	19	
8	Racing Club de Bruxelles	22	8	3	11	43	50	−7	19	
9	Antwerp F.C.	22	6	2	14	25	66	−41	14	
10	Léopold Club de Bruxelles	22	4	5	13	26	63	−37	13	
11	S.C. Courtraisien	22	3	5	14	18	62	−44	11	
12	F.C. Liégeois	22	1	4	17	11	79	−68	6	Relegated to Promotion Division

== Results ==
Home \ Away	ANT	BEE	CSB	FCB	COU	DAR	EXC	LÉO	RCB	USG	FCL	STA
Antwerp		2–2	1–3	1–3	1–0	0–1	1–0	2–0	0–0	0–8	3–0	0–1
Beerschot	1–2		3–2	2–5	5–0	3–1	2–0	3–2	4–1	2–4	3–2	2–0
CS Brugeois	2–0	7–1		4–0	6–0	1–0	3–1	4–0	2–0	1–2	4–1	2–1
FC Brugeois	6–1	4–1	4–2		5–0 (Note: Match awarded.)	2–1	2–0	9–1	7–1	0–2	8–0	2–1
Courtraisien	1–2	1–1	1–2	1–4		1–5	0–0	1–0	4–3	2–1	0–0	0–3
Daring Club	3–2	6–2	2–6	1–1	1–0		3–1	6–1	5–0	0–3	4–0	3–1
Excelsior Bruxelles	6–1	5–0	1–6	2–5	4–0	3–0		2–2	2–1	1–4	10–0	1–0
Léopold	4–2	0–5	0–1	1–4	1–1	1–1	1–1		3–2	2–6	2–0	1–1
Racing Bruxelles	6–2	1–0	0–2	3–3	2–1	1–1	7–1	4–1		1–4	5–0	4–1
Union SG	11–0	7–1	4–0	1–2	9–0	3–0	1–0	4–1	1–0		6–0	5–0
Liège	3–2	1–2	0–6	0–5	3–3	0–3	1–7	0–1	0–1	0–4		0–0
Standard Liège	5–0	3–2	0–1	0–1	4–0	1–0	3–0	4–1	6–0	2–0	0–0	

Legend: Blue = home team win; Yellow = draw; Red = away team win.

== Play-off ==
Team 1	Score	Team 2
Union Saint-Gilloise	1 - 0	F.C. Brugeois

== See also ==
- 1909–10 in Belgian football
