= 1905–06 Belgian First Division =

11th season of top-tier football in Belgium

Belgian First Division
- Season: 1905–06

Statistics of Belgian First Division in the 1905–06 season.

== Overview ==
Location of teams in Belgian First Division 1905–06

It was contested by 10 teams, and Union Saint-Gilloise won the championship.

== League standings ==
Pos	Team	Pld	W	D	L	GF	GA	GD	Pts	Relegation
1	Union Saint-Gilloise	18	15	3	0	75	12	+63	33	
2	F.C. Brugeois	18	12	5	1	59	25	+34	29	
3	Racing Club de Bruxelles	18	10	4	4	57	20	+37	24	
4	C.S. Verviétois	18	7	3	8	32	41	−9	17	
5	Daring Club de Bruxelles	18	6	5	7	32	44	−12	17	
6	Léopold Club de Bruxelles	18	7	2	9	38	52	−14	16	
7	Antwerp F.C.	18	7	0	11	30	58	−28	14	
8	C.S. Brugeois	18	4	4	10	30	45	−15	12	
9	F.C. Liégeois	18	4	2	12	23	65	−42	10	
10	Beerschot	18	2	4	12	34	48	−14	8	Relegated to Promotion Division

== Results ==
Home \ Away	ANT	BEE	CSB	FCB	DAR	LÉO	RCB	USG	FCL	VER
Antwerp		3–1	4–1	1–2	4–1	6–0	0–3	0–3	1–2	2–1
Beerschot	1–4		2–2	3–5	1–2	3–4	1–2	2–2	8–1	4–0
CS Brugeois	5–1	2–1		2–2	1–2	3–0	1–4	1–4	4–0	2–2
FC Brugeois	5–1	4–1	4–1		4–4	4–1	1–0	2–2	8–1	5–0 (Note: Match awarded.)
Daring Club	1–0	2–1	3–0	1–2		3–3	2–3	0–1	4–4	1–2
Léopold	7–0	2–2	6–1	1–5	3–1		0–5	2–5	3–2	2–0
Racing Bruxelles	12–0	1–1	4–1	0–0	0–0	5–1		1–2	8–0	4–1
Union SG	5–0	5–0	2–2	3–0	12–0	5–0	5–2		4–0	5–0
Liège	1–2	3–1	3–1	1–4	1–1	0–5	3–2	0–4		0–2
Verviétois	7–1	4–1	3–0	2–2	2–4	2–0	1–1	0–6	3–1	

Legend: Blue = home team win; Yellow = draw; Red = away team win.

== See also ==
- 1905–06 in Belgian football
