= Coupe Jean Dupuich =

- Founded: 1908
- Abolished: 1925; 101 years ago
- Region: Europe
- Teams: 4 to 8
- Last champions: (Belgium) Union Saint-Gilloise (1925)
- Most championships: (Belgium) Union Saint-Gilloise (4 titles)

The Coupe Jean Dupuich was an international competition for football clubs from Europe that was held from 1908 to 1925 and is seen as the predecessor of the Mitropa Cup formed two years later, in 1927. It was the successor tournament of Coupe Van der Straeten Ponthoz, which was one of the first international club tournaments held in Europe. It was named in honor of the donator of the trophy Adolphe Dupuich.

== History ==
In 1908, this international event took over from the Coupe Van der Straeten Ponthoz which had been created in 1900 by the Count of the same name. In 1907, the Brussels club Union Saint-Gilloise won that competition for the third time in a row, thus earning the right to keep the trophy, so a new trophy was therefore put into play in the following year. The new cup was offered by Mr. Alphonse Dupuich and named in memory of his son Jean, an in young years deceased striker from Léopold FC.

The inaugural tournament in 1908 was contested by 8 teams from 5 countries, Belgium, the Netherlands, France, England, and Germany. Only the first 2 editions of the tournament had a quarterfinal round, from 1910 onwards only the semifinals and final were played. The tournament was held annually from 1908 until 1914 when it had to be stopped because of the outbreak of the First World War. The competition was revived in 1920 and the last edition was played in 1925.

== 1908 Coupe Jean Dupuich ==
Five countries sent their best teams to the 1908 edition, with the hosts Belgium sending three clubs, Léopold FC, and former Coupe Ponthoz champions Union Saint-Gilloise and Racing Club de Bruxelles. Germany sent two teams Preussen Berlin and Preußen Duisburg, while the remaining three nations sent one team each, US Tourquennoise of France, Old Xaverians of England and the Netherlands sent a selection Team from Dutch clubs, naming the selection team Dĳxhoorn XI, which was mostly made up of players from H.B.S.) such as Vic Gonsalves, Frans de Bruijn Kops and Toine van Renterghem.

The French newspaper Le Matin described this tournament as the Coupe Léopold FC. In the semifinals on 20 April, the Belgian champions Union Saint-Gilloise was able to knock out the English team Old Xaverians with a hard-fought 3–2 win, while Racing de Bruxelles comfortably defeated Preussen Berlin by a resounding score of 8–0. This meant that the Union players were more tired when they played the final on the following day, which might have the reason behind Racing's 1–0 win.

=== Results ===
Quarter-finals
19 April 1908 – The Hague
(Belgium) Union Saint-Gilloise	4
(France) US Tourquennoise	1
19 April 1908 – The Hague
(Belgium) Léopold FC	1
(England) Old Xaverians	2
19 April 1908 – The Hague
(Belgium) Racing Club de Bruxelles	4
(German Empire) Preußen Duisburg	0
19 April 1908 – The Hague
(German Empire) Preussen Berlin	6
(Netherlands) Dĳxhoorn XI	1

Semi-finals
20 April 1908 – The Hague
(Belgium) Union Saint-Gilloise	3
(England) Old Xaverians	2
20 April 1908 – The Hague
(Belgium) Racing Club de Bruxelles	8
(German Empire) Preussen Berlin	0

Final
21 April 1908 – The Hague
(Belgium) Union Saint-Gilloise	0
(Belgium) Racing Club de Bruxelles	1

== 1909 Coupe Jean Dupuich ==
The second edition of the Coupe Jean Dupuich saw only Belgian and English teams participate, and one of each reached the final, in which Racing Club de Bruxelles once again lost, this time 2–3 to Bishop Auckland.

=== Results ===
Quarter-finals
11 April 1909 – The Hague
(Belgium) Racing Club de Bruxelles	5
(Netherlands) H.V.V.	0
11 April 1909 – The Hague
(Belgium) Excelsior SC Bruxelles	0
(England) Ilford F.C.	4
11 April 1909 – The Hague
(Belgium) Daring Club de Bruxelles	2
(Netherlands) D.F.C.	0
11 April 1909 – The Hague
(Belgium) Léopold FC	2
(England) Bishop Auckland	5

Semi-finals
12 April 1909 – The Hague
(Belgium) Racing Club de Bruxelles	0
(England) Ilford F.C.	7
12 April 1909 – The Hague
(Belgium) Daring Club de Bruxelles	0
(England) Bishop Auckland	2

Final
13 April 1909 – The Hague
(England) Bishop Auckland	3
(Belgium) Racing Club de Bruxelles	2

== 1910 Coupe Jean Dupuich ==
The third edition of the Coupe Jean Dupuich saw only four teams compete, including the defending winners Bishop Auckland and Bromley F.C. from England, both of which reached the final after beating H.V.V. and "Select Bruxelles" respectively. Both semi-finals were close affairs, with Bromley beating H.V.V. by 2 goals to 1, while Bishop Auckland was held to a 2–2 draw by a Select Bruxelles, and it remained tied after 2x7.5 and 2x5 minutes of extra-time, thus forcing a replay which was played in the following day, and since the final would take place later that day, the game was scheduled to last only 2x15 minutes, and Bishop won 1–0. In the final Bishop secured another 1–0 win to lift the trophy for the second time in a row.

=== Results ===
Semi-finals
27 March 1910 – The Hague
(England) Bishop Auckland	2(1)
(Netherlands) H.V.V.	2(0)
27 and 28 March 1910 – The Hague
(Belgium) Select Bruxelles	1
(England) Bromley F.C.	2

Final
28 March 1910 – The Hague
(England) Bishop Auckland	1
(England) Bromley F.C.	0

== 1911 Coupe Jean Dupuich ==
The fourth edition of the Coupe Jean Dupuich was a Belgian-English affair with each nation having two clubs each, and it was the English who once again dominated the competition, with Ilford F.C. beating the then Belgian powerhouse Union Saint-Gilloise (3–1), while the two-time winners Bishop Auckland managed to beat Daring Club in a thrilling 5–4 win, hence keeping alive their hopes of winning the cup for the third consecutive time, however, they failed to do so as they lost the final 0–1 to Ilford.

=== Results ===
Semi-finals
16 April 1911 – The Hague
(Belgium) Union Saint-Gilloise	1
(England) Ilford F.C.	3
16 April 1911 – The Hague
(Belgium) Daring Club de Bruxelles	4
(England) Bishop Auckland	5

Final
17 April 1911 – The Hague
(England) Ilford F.C.	1
(England) Bishop Auckland	0

== 1912 Coupe Jean Dupuich ==
The fifth edition of the competition witnessed Union Saint-Gilloise return to its prime, beating the current winners Ilford F.C. with a shocking 6–1 trashing, thus retributing Ilford's courtesy of the previous tournament, and then they defeated fellow Belgian Daring Club de Bruxelles 1–0.

=== Results ===
Semi-finals
6 April 1912 – The Hague
(Belgium) Union Saint-Gilloise	6
(England) Ilford F.C.	1
6 April 1912 – The Hague
(Belgium) Daring Club de Bruxelles	2
(German Empire) Freiburger FC	1

Final
7 April 1912 – The Hague
(Belgium) Union Saint-Gilloise	1
(Belgium) Daring Club de Bruxelles	0

== 1913 Coupe Jean Dupuich ==
The sixth edition of the Coupe Jean Dupuich was won by Union Saint-Gilloise after two 3–2 wins over 1. FC Nürnberg in the semi-finals and Barking F.C. in the final, thus winning the competition for the second time in a row.

=== Results ===
Semi-finals
23 March 1913 – The Hague
(Belgium) Union Saint-Gilloise	3
(German Empire) 1. FC Nürnberg	2
23 March 1913 – The Hague
(Belgium) Daring Club de Bruxelles	1
(England) Barking F.C.	2

Final
24 March 1913 – The Hague
(Belgium) Union Saint-Gilloise	3
(England) Barking F.C.	2

== 1914 Coupe Jean Dupuich ==
The seventh edition of the Coupe Jean Dupuich saw Union Saint-Gilloise and Daring Club being the Belgian representatives once more, and again they reached the final which was again won by Saint-Gilloise (3–1), who lifted the trophy for the third time in a row, thus repeating the feat they had accomplished between 1906 and 1908 with Coupe Van der Straeten Ponthoz. This was also the first tournament in the competition's history that had a third-place play-off, with the losing semi-finalists, South Bank F.C. of England and VfB Leipzig of Germany, facing off for bronze, being the former who came out as 5–0 winners.

=== Results ===
Semi-finals
11 April 1914 – The Hague
(Belgium) Union Saint-Gilloise	4
(England) South Bank F.C.	2
11 April 1914 – The Hague
(Belgium) Daring Club de Bruxelles	6
(German Empire) VfB Leipzig	1

Final
12 April 1914 – The Hague
(Belgium) Union Saint-Gilloise	3
(Belgium) Daring Club de Bruxelles	1
Third place match
12 April 1914 – The Hague
(England) South Bank F.C.	5
(German Empire) VfB Leipzig	0

== 1920 Coupe Jean Dupuich ==
Even though the competition's six-year hiatus due to World War I and the Union Saint-Gilloise three successive wins perfectly set up a second name change for the competition, the cup remained known as the Coupe Jean Dupuich, and its eight edition in 1920 counted with two Belgians clubs and one each from France and England. The semi-finals between Daring Club de Bruxelles and US Tourquennoise set a CJD all-time record for the highest scoring match with a total of 13 goals, as the Belgians trashed the French with a resounding 10–3 win. The third-place match then broke that same record when Middlessex League of England trashed the same French team 15–1. The final was thus an all-Belgian affair in which Racing Club/Léopold FC defeated Daring Club 3–2.

=== Results ===
Semi-finals
4 April 1920 – The Hague
(Belgium) Racing Club/Léopold FC	4
(England) Middlessex League	2
4 April 1920 – The Hague
(Belgium) Daring Club	10
(France) US Tourquennoise	3

Final
5 April 1920 – The Hague
(Belgium) Racing Club/Léopold FC	3
(Belgium) Daring Club	2
Third place match
5 April 1920 – The Hague
(England) Middlessex League	15
(France) US Tourquennoise	1

== 1922 Coupe Jean Dupuich ==
The ninth edition of the Coupe Jean Dupuich saw another all-Belgian final between Racing Club/Léopold FC and Daring Club, which ended with the same winner, but this time with a 2–1 win.

=== Results ===
Semi-finals
16 April 1922 – The Hague
(Belgium) Racing Club/Léopold FC	4
(Netherlands) Feyenoord Rotterdam	3
16 April 1922 – The Hague
(Belgium) Daring Club de Bruxelles	2
(France) CA Paris	0

Final
17 April 1922 – The Hague
(Belgium) Racing Club/Léopold FC	2
(Belgium) Daring Club	1
Third place match
17 April 1922 – The Hague
(France) CA Paris	3
(Netherlands) Feyenoord Rotterdam	1

== 1923 Coupe Jean Dupuich ==
The tenth edition of this competition was marked by the return of Union Saint-Gilloise, who was way past its prime and ended up being knocked out in the semi-finals by Feyenoord Rotterdam, who thus become the first-ever non-Belgian and non-English team to reach the final of the Coupe Jean Dupuich, although they lost it to Daring Club de Bruxelles (2–0).

=== Results ===
Semi-finals
1 April 1923 – The Hague
(Belgium) Union Saint-Gilloise	1
(Netherlands) Feyenoord Rotterdam	3
1 April 1923 – The Hague
(Belgium) Daring Club de Bruxelles	1
(England) Corinthian F.C.	0

Final
2 April 1923 – The Hague
(Belgium) Daring Club de Bruxelles	2
(Netherlands) Feyenoord Rotterdam	0
Third place match
2 April 1923 – The Hague
(Belgium) Union Saint-Gilloise	5
(England) Corinthian F.C.	2

== 1924 Coupe Jean Dupuich ==
The eleventh edition of the Jean Dupuich was contested by two teams from Belgium and one each from the Netherlands and Czechoslovakia. The representative of the latter was a Prague selection, which faced a Brussels selection in the semi-finals, which ended in a 4–1 win to the hosts. In the other semi-final clash, Darling defeated FC Dordrecht 5–0, thus reaching their fourth consecutive final after having previously lost in 1920 and 1922, and won in 1923. The final was thus an all-Belgium affair and it ended in a 1–1 draw, a result that remained unaltered even after two prologantions were played, so the 22 players decide to keep the draw until the end and both are given as the winner, with each team receiving a decreased trophy.

=== Results ===
Semi-finals
12 April 1924 – The Hague
(Belgium) Daring Club	5
(Netherlands) FC Dordrecht	0
12 April 1924 – The Hague
(Czechoslovakia) Prague Select	1
(Belgium) Brussels Select	4

Final
13 April 1924 – The Hague
(Belgium) Daring Club	1
(Belgium) Brussels Select	1
Third place match

== 1925 Coupe Jean Dupuich ==
The twelfth and last edition of the Coupe Jean Dupuich was won by Union Saint-Gilloise after beating Feyenoord Rotterdam 1–0 in the semi-finals and then St Albans City 2–0 in the final. Another notable result was the semi-finals between St Albans City and Entente bruxelloise (Brussels agreement), which ended in a 6–4 win in the favour of the English.

=== Results ===
Semi-finals
12 April 1925 – The Hague
(Belgium) Union Saint-Gilloise	1
(Netherlands) Feyenoord Rotterdam	0
12 April 1925 – The Hague
(England) St Albans City	6
(Belgium) Entente bruxelloise	4

Final
13 April 1925 – The Hague
(Belgium) Union Saint-Gilloise	2
(England) St Albans City	1
Third place match
13 April 1925 – The Hague
(Netherlands) Feyenoord Rotterdam	3
(Belgium) Entente bruxelloise	0

== Champions ==
=== List of finals ===
Year	Champion	Result	Runner-up
1908	(Belgium) Racing Club	1–0	(Belgium) Union Saint-Gilloise
1909	(England) Bishop Auckland	3–2	(England) Ilford
1910	(England) Bishop Auckland	1–0	(England) Bromley
1911	(England) Ilford	1–0	(England) Bishop Auckland
1912	(Belgium) Union Saint-Gilloise	1–0	(Belgium) Daring Club
1913	(Belgium) Union Saint-Gilloise	3–2	(Belgium) Barking
1914	(Belgium) Union Saint-Gilloise	3–1	(Belgium) Daring Club
1920	(Belgium) Racing Club/Léopold FC	3–2	(Belgium) Daring Club
1922	(Belgium) Racing Club/Léopold FC	2–1	(Belgium) Daring Club
1923	(Belgium) Daring Club	2–0	(Netherlands) Feyenoord
1924	(Belgium) Bruxelles XI	1–1	(Belgium) Daring Club
1925	(Belgium) Union Saint-Gilloise	2–1	(England) St Albans City

=== Titles by club ===
Club	Titles	Year
(Belgium) Union Saint-Gilloise	4	1912, 1913, 1914, 1925
(Belgium) Racing Club de Bruxelles	3	1908, 1920, 1922 (Note: 1920 and 1922 as part of the selection with additional players from the Belgian club Léopold FC.)
(England) Bishop Auckland F.C.	2	1909, 1910
(Belgium) Daring Club de Bruxelles	2	1923 and 1924 (shared)
(England) Ilford F.C.	1	1911
(Belgium) Bruxelles XI (Note: The selection included players from three Belgian clubs: Royale Uccle Sport, RSC Anderlecht, and Racing Club de Bruxelles.)	1	1924 (shared)

=== Titles by country ===
Country	Winners	Runner-ups
Belgium	9	6
England	3	5
Netherlands	0	1

== See also ==
- Challenge Cup
- Challenge International du Nord
- Coupe Van der Straeten Ponthoz
- Mitropa Cup
- European Cup
