= 1907–08 in Belgian football =

Football in Belgium
- Season: 1907–08

The 1907–08 season was the 13th competitive season in Belgian football.

== Overview ==
In order to increase the number of clubs in the first division, no club was relegated at the end of the season and two clubs qualified from the second division, namely RC Gantois and ESC de Bruxelles.

== National team ==
Date	Venue	Opponents	Score*	Comp	Belgium scorers	Match Report
March 29, 1908	Olympisch Stadion, Antwerp (H)	The Netherlands	1–4	F	Maurice Vertongen	FA website
April 12, 1908	Stade Olympique Yves-du-Manoir, Colombes (A)	France	2-1	F	Robert De Veen (2)	FA website
April 18, 1908	Vélodrome de Longchamps, Brussels (H)	England amateur	2-8	F	Robert De Veen (2)	FA website
April 26, 1908	Schuttersveld, Rotterdam (A)	The Netherlands	1-3	F	Louis Saeys	FA website

* Belgium score given first

Key

- H = Home match
- A = Away match
- F = Friendly
- o.g. = own goal

== Honours ==
Competition	Winner
Division I	Racing Club de Bruxelles
Promotion	Racing Club de Gand

== Final league tables ==
=== Promotion ===
In the first stage, 4 provincial leagues were played, with the top two teams of each league qualifying for the final round:

- For Antwerp, Antwerp Football Alliance (winner) and RC de Malines (runner-up)
- For Liège, Standard FC Liégeois (winner) and CS Verviétois (runner-up, and relegated last season)
- For West and East Flanders, AA La Gantoise (winner) and RC de Gand (runner-up)
- For Brabant, ESC de Bruxelles (winner) and Daring Club de Bruxelles II (runner-up)

Pos	Team	Pld	Won	Drw	Lst	GF	GA	Pts	GD	Notes
1	RC de Gand	7	6	0	1	22	10	12	+12	Promoted to First Division, Play-off required as level on points.
2	ESC de Bruxelles	7	6	0	1	25	4	12	+21	Promoted to First Division, Play-off required as level on points.
3	Standard FC Liégeois	7	4	0	3	19	9	8	+10	
4	AA La Gantoise	6	3	0	3	21	11	6	+10	
5	Daring Club de Bruxelles II	7	3	0	4	13	23	6	-10	
6	RC de Malines	7	3	0	4	12	21	6	-9	
7	CS Verviétois	6	1	0	5	6	21	2	-15	
8	Antwerp Football Alliance	7	1	0	6	10	32	2	-22	

=== Play-off ===
Team 1	Score	Team 2
RC de Gand	4 - 3	ESC de Bruxelles
