= 1908–09 Belgian First Division =

14th season of top-tier football in Belgium

Belgian First Division
- Season: 1908–09

Statistics of Belgian First Division in the 1908–09 season.

== Overview ==
Location of teams in Belgian First Division 1908–09

It was contested by 12 teams, and Union Saint-Gilloise won the championship.

== League standings ==
Pos	Team	Pld	W	D	L	GF	GA	GD	Pts	Relegation
1	Union Saint-Gilloise	22	19	3	0	101	13	+88	41	
2	Daring Club de Bruxelles	22	15	4	3	63	27	+36	34	
3	F.C. Brugeois	22	15	3	4	63	26	+37	33	
4	Racing Club de Bruxelles	22	14	2	6	59	21	+38	30	
5	Beerschot	22	10	3	9	62	45	+17	23	
6	C.S. Brugeois	22	11	0	11	57	45	+12	22	
7	Excelsior S.C. de Bruxelles	22	9	4	9	41	40	+1	22	
8	Antwerp F.C.	22	7	1	14	48	57	−9	15	
9	S.C. Courtraisien	22	5	3	14	27	86	−59	13	
10	Léopold Club de Bruxelles	22	3	5	14	30	70	−40	11	
11	F.C. Liégeois	22	5	1	16	22	84	−62	11	
12	R.C. Gantois	22	2	3	17	19	78	−59	7	Relegated to Promotion Division

== Results ==
Home \ Away	ANT	BEE	CSB	FCB	COU	DAR	EXC	LÉO	RCB	USG	GAN	FCL
Antwerp		2–0	5–3	2–1	4–0	1–3	1–3	5–0	0–2	1–3	9–0	6–1
Beerschot	2–1		1–3	2–2	7–2	3–4	6–1	5–1	1–0	0–1	0–2	16–0
CS Brugeois	3–1	8–1		2–4	9–0	1–4	0–2	4–2	1–4	1–3	5–0	5–0
FC Brugeois	5–0 (Note: Match awarded.)	2–1	3–0		11–0	2–2	4–0	3–0	2–1	1–1	4–0	5–0
Courtraisien	2–2	2–3	2–1	1–3		0–5	1–0	3–3	0–8	0–4	2–0	5–0
Daring Club	4–1	1–1	3–1	3–0	4–2		6–2	1–0	1–2	3–3	6–1	2–0
Excelsior Bruxelles	0–1	1–1	2–4	0–2	5–0	1–1		5–0	2–1	2–3	4–1	5–1
Léopold	5–2	2–4	0–3	1–3	5–1	2–3	2–2		2–2	1–7	1–1	0–1
Racing Bruxelles	6–0	4–1	1–0	0–4	6–0	2–1	0–1	4–0		0–0	2–0	4–0
Union SG	11–0	5–2	4–0	5–0	4–0	1–0	4–0	8–0	5–0		10–1	5–0
Racing Gand	1–3	1–3	1–3	0–2	1–1	0–3	1–1	2–2	0–5	0–6		6–0
Liège	2–1	0–2	2–0	5–0	1–3	1–3	0–2	1–1	0–5	1–8	6–0	

Legend: Blue = home team win; Yellow = draw; Red = away team win.

== See also ==
- 1908–09 in Belgian football
