= 1911–12 Belgian First Division =

17th season of top-tier football in Belgium

Belgian First Division
- Season: 1911–12

Statistics of Belgian First Division in the 1911–12 season.

== Overview ==
Location of teams in Belgian First Division 1911–12

It was contested by 12 teams, and Daring Club de Bruxelles won the championship.

== League standings ==
Pos	Team	Pld	W	D	L	GF	GA	GD	Pts	Relegation
1	Daring Club de Bruxelles	22	18	2	2	79	15	+64	38	
2	Union Saint-Gilloise	22	17	2	3	83	24	+59	36	
3	Racing Club de Bruxelles	22	13	3	6	72	27	+45	29	
4	F.C. Brugeois	22	11	7	4	47	25	+22	29	
5	C.S. Brugeois	22	11	5	6	56	29	+27	27	
6	Antwerp F.C.	22	9	2	11	33	57	−24	20	
7	R.C. Gantois	22	5	7	10	26	45	−19	17	
8	Excelsior S.C. de Bruxelles	22	5	6	11	23	61	−38	16	
9	Standard Club Liégeois	22	6	3	13	29	85	−56	15	
10	Beerschot	22	5	4	13	20	60	−40	14	
11	R.C. Malines	22	3	7	12	22	42	−20	13	Relegated to Promotion Division
12	Léopold Club de Bruxelles	22	3	4	15	24	46	−22	10	Relegated to Promotion Division

== Results ==
Home \ Away	ANT	BEE	CSB	FCB	DAR	EXC	LÉO	RCB	USG	GAN	RCM	STA
Antwerp		3–0	3–2	2–1	0–5	1–4	2–1	1–0	1–5	4–0	1–0	0–3
Beerschot	1–4		1–1	2–0	1–4	0–1	2–5	0–5	0–6	2–1	0–0	4–0
CS Brugeois	3–0	4–0		0–0	0–3	3–0	1–1	2–1	4–1	1–1	3–1	8–0
FC Brugeois	2–0	10–0	2–5		1–0	7–0	3–2	1–3	1–1	6–1	2–2	9–0
Daring Club	6–0	0–0	3–0	4–0		6–0	8–1	4–1	2–0	7–2	4–1	8–1
Excelsior Bruxelles	2–2	0–3	1–1	0–6	0–6		3–1	2–4	0–2	1–1	1–0	1–3
Léopold	5–0	0–1	1–2	0–1	0–2	1–1		0–3	1–4	1–1	1–1	2–1
Racing Bruxelles	6–1	5–0	1–3	0–0	4–1	1–1	4–0		1–2	6–0	3–2	16–1
Union SG	4–3	6–0	3–1	7–2	0–1	9–0	3–0	3–0		3–2	3–1	12–1
Racing Gand	1–1	1–0	0–1	0–0	1–1	1–1	1–0	1–3	0–3		5–0	2–0
RC Malines	1–3	3–2	1–1	0–1	1–2	1–3	1–0	1–1	1–1	3–1		2–3
Standard Liège	5–1	1–1	1–1	0–1	1–2	2–1	2–0	1–4	2–5	1–3	1–1	

Legend: Blue = home team win; Yellow = draw; Red = away team win.

== See also ==
- 1911–12 in Belgian football
