= 1911–12 in Belgian football =

Football in Belgium
- Season: 1911–12

The 1911–12 season was the 17th season of competitive football in Belgium.

== Overview ==
Daring Club de Bruxelles claimed their first ever silverware by winning the Division I. From this season on it was decided that the last two first division clubs would be relegated to the promotion, replaced by the top two clubs of the promotion. RC de Malines and Léopold Club de Bruxelles were thus relegated, replaced by FC Liégeois and CS Verviétois.

== National team ==
Date	Venue	Opponents	Score*	Comp	Belgium scorers	Match Report
January 28, 1912	Stade de Paris, Paris (A)	France	1-1	F	Gaston Hubin	FA website
February 20, 1912	Olympisch Stadion, Antwerp (H)	Switzerland	9-2	F	Jean Van Cant (2), Louis Saeys (3), Alphonse Six (2), Robert De Veen (2)	FA website
March 10, 1912	Olympisch Stadion, Antwerp (H)	The Netherlands	1-2	F	Fernand Nisot	FA website
April 8, 1912	Vélodrome de Longchamps, Brussels (H)	England amateur	1-2	F	Fernand Nisot	FA website
April 28, 1912	Dordrecht (A)	The Netherlands	3-4	F	Joseph Musch, Fernand Nisot (2)	FA website

* Belgium score given first

Key

- H = Home match
- A = Away match
- N = On neutral ground
- F = Friendly
- o.g. = own goal

== Honours ==
Competition	Winner
Division I	Daring Club de Bruxelles
Promotion	F.C. Liégeois
Cup	Racing Club de Bruxelles

== Final league tables ==
=== Promotion ===
Pos	Team	Pld	Won	Drw	Lst	GF	GA	Pts	GD	Notes
1	CS Verviétois	22	16	5	1	59	16	37	+43	Promoted to First Division, Play-off to decide champion as level on points.
2	FC Liégeois	22	17	3	2	46	13	37	+33	Promoted to First Division, Play-off to decide champion as level on points.
3	SC Courtraisien	22	12	3	7	33	41	27	-8	
4	FC Malinois	22	10	3	9	48	29	23	+19	
5	AA La Gantoise	22	9	4	9	58	37	22	+21	
6	FC de Bressoux	22	6	7	9	24	39	19	-15	
7	Stade Louvaniste	22	8	2	12	37	44	18	-7	
8	Tilleur FC	22	7	4	11	23	33	18	-10	
9	EFC Hasselt	22	7	4	11	24	45	18	-21	
10	US Tournaisienne	22	6	4	12	28	58	16	-30	
11	AS Anvers Borgerhout	22	5	5	12	32	49	15	-17	
12	Berchem Sport	22	4	6	12	26	34	14	-8	

=== Play-off ===
Team 1	Score	Team 2
FC Liégeois	1 - 0	CS Verviétois
