= 1906–07 in Belgian football =

Football in Belgium
- Season: 1906–07

The 1906–07 season was the 12th competitive season in Belgian football.

== Overview ==
CS Verviétois was relegated to the second division at the end of the season and was replaced by second division champion Beerschot AC.

== National team ==
Date	Venue	Opponents	Score*	Comp	Belgium scorers	Match Report
April 14, 1907	Olympisch Stadion, Antwerp (H)	The Netherlands	1-3 (aet)	F	René Feye	FA website
April 21, 1907	Stade du Vivier d'Oie, Brussels (H)	France	1–2	F	Charles Cambier	FA website
May 9, 1907	Haarlem (A)	The Netherlands	2-1	F	René Feye, Hector Goetinck	FA website

* Belgium score given first

Key

- H = Home match
- A = Away match
- F = Friendly
- o.g. = own goal

== Honours ==
Competition	Winner
Division I	Union Saint-Gilloise
Promotion	Beerschot AC

== Final league tables ==
=== Promotion ===
In the first stage, 4 provincial leagues were played, with the following qualifiers for the final round:

- For Brabant, Atheneum VV (winner) and Olympia Club de Bruxelles (runner-up) qualified via the Brabant final round
- For Antwerp, Beerschot AC (relegated last season) qualified
- For East and West Flanders, AA La Gantoise qualified
- For Liège, Standard FC Liégeois qualified

Pos	Team	Pld	Won	Drw	Lst	GF	GA	Pts	GD	Notes
1	Beerschot AC	8	6	0	2	42	21	12	+21	Promoted to First Division
2	Atheneum VV	8	4	2	2	18	13	10	+5	
3	AA La Gantoise	8	4	0	4	22	30	8	-8	
4	Standard FC Liégeois	8	3	0	5	15	17	6	-2	
5	Olympia Club de Bruxelles	8	1	2	5	16	32	4	-16	
