= 1910–11 in Belgian football =

Football in Belgium
- Season: 1910–11

The 1910–11 season was the 16th season of competitive football in Belgium.

== Overview ==
CS Brugeois claimed their first ever silverware by winning the Division I. SC Courtraisien finished 12th and last of the first division and was relegated to the promotion, and replaced by promotion winner RC de Gand.

== National team ==
Date	Venue	Opponents	Score*	Comp	Belgium scorers	Match Report
March 4, 1911	Crystal Palace Stadium, London (N)	England amateur	0-4	F		FA website
March 19, 1911	Olympisch Stadion, Antwerp (H)	The Netherlands	1-5	F	Désiré Paternoster	FA website
April 2, 1911	Dordrecht (A)	The Netherlands	1-3	F	Alphonse Six	FA website
April 23, 1911	Plaine du Champ d'Oiseaux, Liège (H)	Germany	2-1	F	Franz Vanhoutte, Louis Saeys	FA website
April 30, 1911	Rue de Forest, Brussels (H)	France	7-1	F	Robert De Veen (5), Louis Saeys, Jean Bouttiau	FA website

* Belgium score given first

Key

- H = Home match
- A = Away match
- N = On neutral ground
- F = Friendly
- o.g. = own goal

== Honours ==
Competition	Winner
Division I	CS Brugeois
Promotion	RC de Gand

== Final league tables ==
=== Promotion ===
Pos	Team	Pld	Won	Drw	Lst	GF	GA	Pts	GD	Notes
1	RC de Gand	22	16	3	3	66	13	35	+53	Promoted to First Division.
2	Uccle Sport	22	17	1	4	58	10	35	+48	
3	CS Verviétois	22	14	1	7	63	27	29	+36	
4	FC Malinois	22	13	3	6	48	27	29	+21	
5	AS Anvers Borgerhout	22	12	2	8	52	47	26	+5	
6	AA La Gantoise	22	12	1	9	63	37	25	+26	
7	FC Liégeois	22	9	3	10	42	47	21	-5	
8	Tilleur FC	22	8	4	10	36	53	20	-17	
9	Stade Louvaniste	22	8	0	14	44	43	16	+1	
10	SC de Theux	22	5	1	16	39	86	11	-47	
11	US Tournaisienne	22	5	1	16	31	80	11	-49	
12	Antwerp Football Alliance	22	2	2	18	18	92	6	-74	
