= 1904–05 Belgian First Division =

10th season of top-tier football in Belgium

Belgian First Division
- Season: 1904–05

Statistics of Belgian First Division in the 1904–05 season.

== Overview ==
Location of teams in Belgian First Division 1904–05

This season saw the two Groups merged back into one National Division: this was also the last season before promotion and relegation was introduced with the creation of the "Promotion" Division.
It was contested by 11 teams, and Union Saint-Gilloise won the championship.

== League standings ==
Pos	Team	Pld	W	D	L	GF	GA	GD	Pts	
1	Union Saint-Gilloise	20	17	1	2	83	12	+71	35	
2	Racing Club de Bruxelles	20	13	4	3	76	25	+51	30	
3	F.C. Brugeois	20	13	2	5	63	26	+37	28	
4	F.C. Liégeois	20	13	1	6	48	29	+19	27	
5	Daring Club de Bruxelles	19	10	2	7	42	33	+9	22	
6	Beerschot	20	9	2	9	47	43	+4	20	
7	C.S. Verviétois	19	8	0	11	43	63	−20	16	
8	C.S. Brugeois	19	6	3	10	33	40	−7	15	
9	Léopold Club de Bruxelles	19	5	2	12	35	60	−25	12	
10	Antwerp F.C.	18	4	1	13	28	56	−28	9	
11	Athletic and Running Club de Bruxelles	20	0	0	20	5	116	−111	0	Not participating next season.

== Results ==
Home \ Away	ANT	BEE	CSB	FCB	ARC	DAR	LÉO	RCB	USG	FCL	VER
Antwerp		2–3	0–3	1–4	5–0 (Note: Match awarded.)	0–2	1–1	3–1	0–2	1–4	2–3
Beerschot	5–2		6–0	0–3	5–0	0–2	2–1	2–1	0–1	2–5	2–3
CS Brugeois	– (Note: Match no longer held.)	1–1		0–5	5–0	1–2	6–0	2–5	0–3	0–0	0–2
FC Brugeois	4–0	2–2	5–0		5–0	6–1	5–0	1–2	0–4	0–1	5–3
Athletic Club Bruxelles	0–5	0–5	2–6	0–7		0–4	2–8	0–5	0–5	0–5	1–4
Daring Club	4–0	2–1	1–1	2–1	5–0		4–1	4–4	1–3	0–2	5–0
Léopold	0–6	2–3	1–4	0–3	8–1	3–1		3–3	0–5	4–3	5–0
Racing Bruxelles	7–0	3–2	3–0	1–1	14–0	2–0	2–1		1–3	5–0	5–0
Union SG	5–0	2–3	5–0	6–0	5–0	5–0	1–2	2–2		4–0	11–2
Liège	3–0	5–0	2–1	0–2	5–0	3–0	3–0	1–4	1–4		3–0
Verviétois	6–0	6–3	1–3	1–3	5–0	0–2	5–0 (Note: At the score of 2–2 interrupted due to the onset of darkness. Since Léopold refused to continue the game, the match was rated as a 5–0 win for Verviers.)	2–9	0–7	0–2	

Legend: Blue = home team win; Yellow = draw; Red = away team win.

== See also ==
- 1904–05 in Belgian football
