= Limbourg =

City in Liège Province, Wallonia, Belgium

Limbourg Limbôr (Walloon): Limburg (Dutch); Limburg (German)
- Municipality
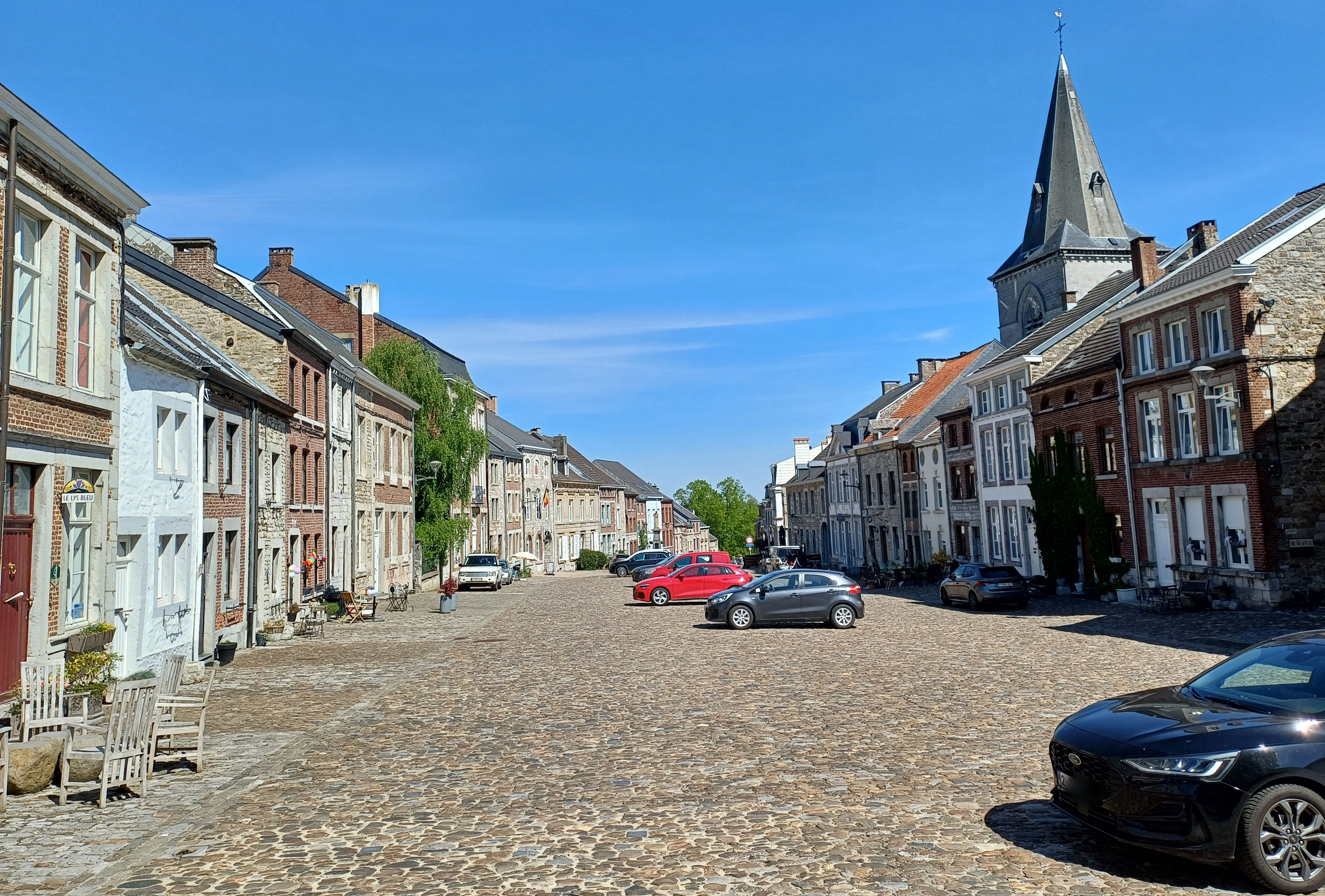
- Old centre of Limbourg

- Flag Coat of arms

- Location of Limbourg in the province of Liège
- Interactive map of Limbourg
- Location in Belgium
- Coordinates: 50°37′N 05°56′E
- Country: Belgium
- Community: French Community
- Region: Wallonia
- Province: Liège
- Arrondissement: Verviers

Government
  - Mayor: Valérie Fautre-Dejardin (PS)
  - Governing party: La Limbourgeoise

Area
  - Total: 24.64 km^{2} (9.51 sq mi)

Population (2018-01-01)
  - Total: 5,939
  - Density: 241.0/km^{2} (624.3/sq mi)
- Postal codes: 4830–4834
- NIS code: 63046
- Area codes: 087
- Website: www.ville-limbourg.be

Limbourg (French pronunciation: [lɛ̃buʁ]; German: Limburg an der Weser; Dutch: Limburg; Walloon: Limbôr) or Limbourg-sur-Vesdre is a city and municipality of Wallonia located in the province of Liège, Belgium.

On 1 January 2008, Limbourg had a total population of 5,680. The total area is 24.63 km^{2} which gives a population density of 231 inhabitants per km^{2}.

The municipality consists of the following districts: Bilstain, Goé, and Limbourg.

The lower part of the town, along the Vesdre, is called Dolhain.

== Etymology and history ==
Historical affiliations

Duchy of Lower Lorraine 1000–1065
Duchy of Limburg 1065–1795
Burgundian Netherlands 1430–1482
Habsburg Netherlands 1482–1556
Spanish Netherlands 1556–1714
Austrian Netherlands 1714–1794
French Republic 1795–1804
French Empire 1804–1815
Kingdom of the Netherlands 1815–1830
Kingdom of Belgium 1830–present

The second part of the name Limbourg is from burg meaning a fortified town, which is common in many parts of Europe where Germanic languages are spoken or have been spoken historically (see Germanic placename etymology). Concerning the first part of the name, there are various theories. One is lint meaning "dragon". Another is that it refers back to the Roman-era limes, situated at boundaries of the Empire. It may also have been related to the material lim or lime. Jean-Louis Kupper has proposed that the fort was named by its founder Frederick after Limburg Abbey in Germany, which in his lifetime had important connection to his imperial patrons and the Abbey of Stavelot, for which he was advowee.

Limbourg is located on top of a hill which in its turn is surrounded by the river Vesdre. This was a strong military advantage in the Middle Ages and allowed the city to defend itself against foreign invaders. In the Middle Ages, the ruling family came to have the rank of duke and so the town was the seat of the Duchy of Limburg, which was a part of the Lower Lorraine region of the Holy Roman Empire.

The town featured in the War of the Spanish Succession, falling in 1703 to English and Dutch forces led by the Duke of Marlborough.

The song 'The Fat Lady of Limbourg' on Brian Eno's 1974 album 'Taking Tiger Mountain (By Strategy)' describes an asylum in the town which has more patients than there are residents of the town.

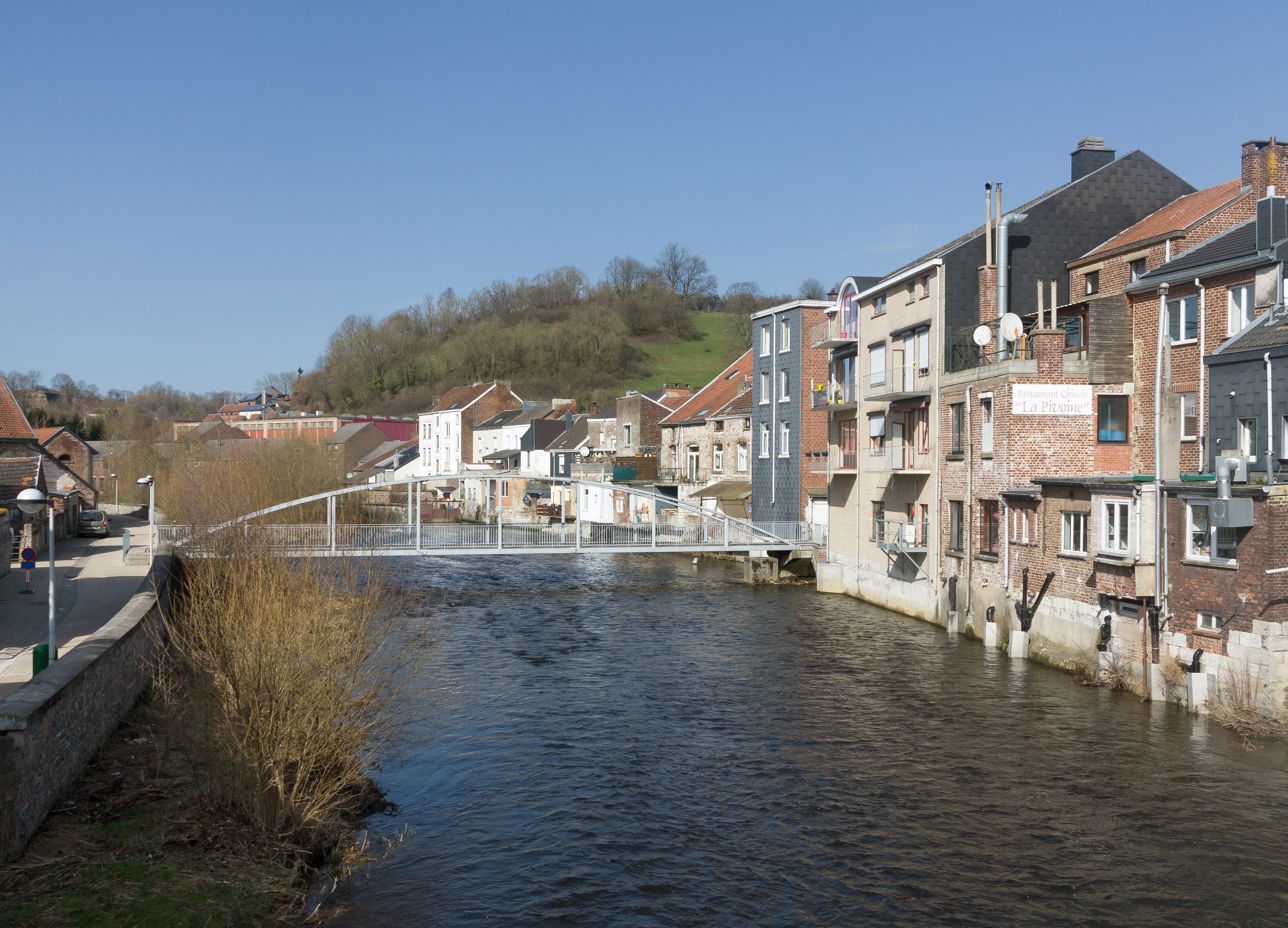
Limbourg, the Vesdre

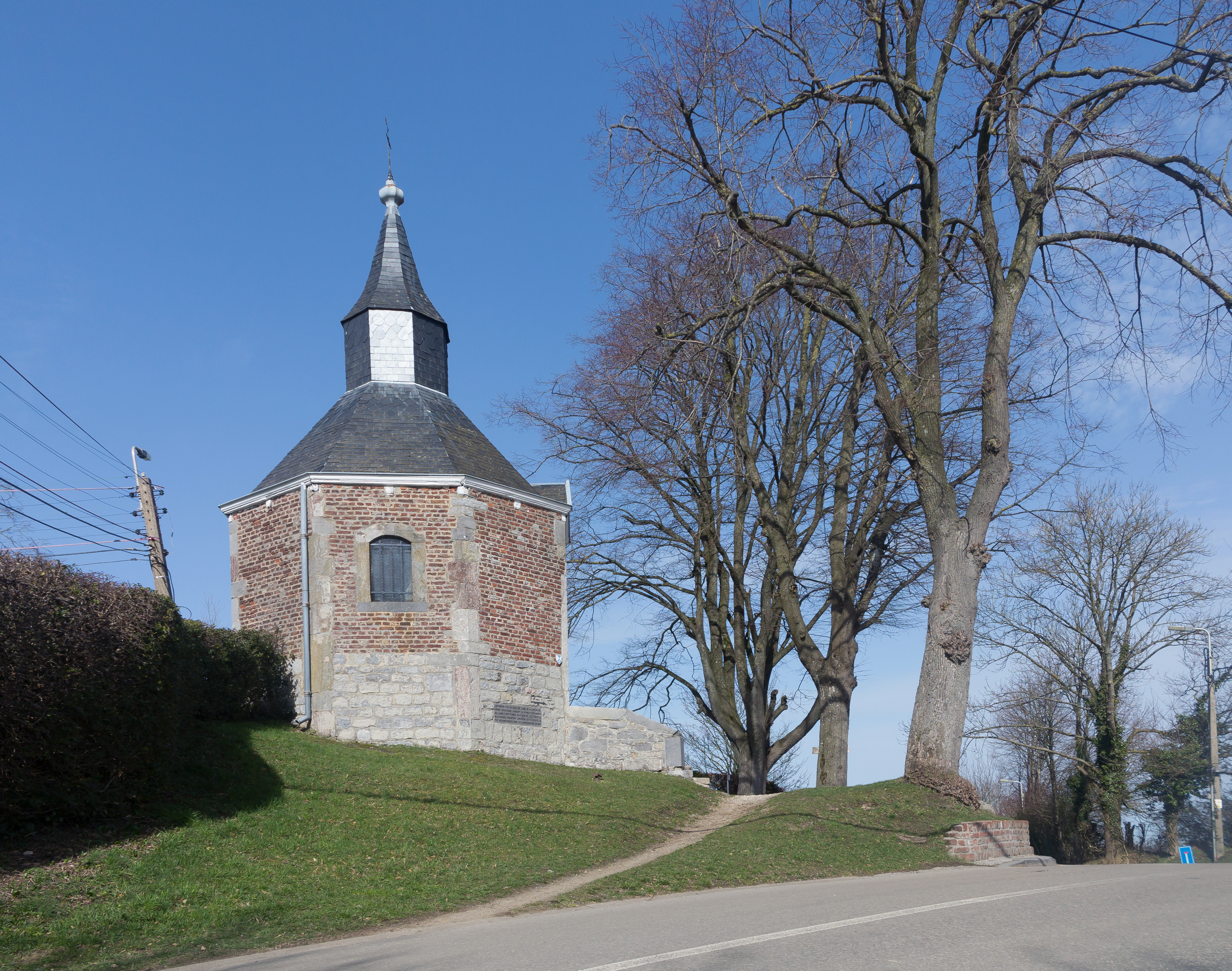
The chapel of Saint Anne

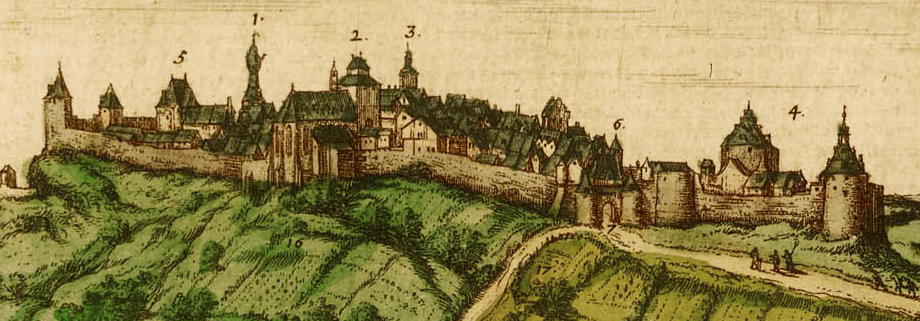
Limbourg about 1600

== In popular culture ==
- The Fat Lady of Limbourg, song by English musician Brian Eno.

== See also ==
- List of protected heritage sites in Limbourg
- Duchy of Limburg
