= 1907–08 Belgian First Division =

13th season of top-tier football in Belgium

Belgian First Division
- Season: 1907–08

Statistics of Belgian First Division in the 1907–08 season.

== Overview ==
Location of teams in Belgian First Division 1907–08

It was contested by 10 teams, and Racing Club de Bruxelles won the championship.
There was no relegation, as the First Division was extended the following season from 10 clubs to 12.

== League standings ==
Pos	Team	Pld	W	D	L	GF	GA	GD	Pts
1	Racing Club de Bruxelles	18	17	1	0	73	12	+61	35
2	Union Saint-Gilloise	18	15	0	3	68	17	+51	30
3	F.C. Brugeois	18	12	2	4	58	26	+32	26
4	Beerschot	18	9	1	8	41	45	−4	19
5	Daring Club de Bruxelles	18	9	0	9	58	35	+23	18
6	Antwerp F.C.	18	8	2	8	30	42	−12	18
7	F.C. Liégeois	18	3	3	12	25	57	−32	9
8	S.C. Courtraisien	18	3	3	12	29	69	−40	9
9	Léopold Club de Bruxelles	18	2	4	12	25	70	−45	8
10	C.S. Brugeois	18	2	2	14	23	57	−34	6

== Results ==
Home \ Away	ANT	BEE	CSB	FCB	COU	DAR	LÉO	RCB	USG	FCL
Antwerp		2–4	0–3	1–1	3–3	3–2	2–1	1–6	1–2	5–0
Beerschot	0–3		1–0	1–4	9–0	3–2	3–1	0–3	0–7	0–1
CS Brugeois	0–1	2–4		1–2	5–3	1–7	5–5	0–2	0–7	1–1
FC Brugeois	– (Note: The match between FC Brugeois and Antwerp was ended 2:1. The points were initially awarded to Antwerp after spectators harassed some Antwerp players on the pitch. It later emerged that Antwerp had an ineligible player on the pitch, so they were stripped of the two points again and both clubs were declared goalless losers of the game.)	8–1	4–0		5–0	2–1	10–1	0–0	2–4	5–2
Courtraisien	0–2	2–3	3–1	1–6		1–4	1–1	3–6	1–5	4–0
Daring Club	4–0	1–3	4–0	2–3	6–0		6–1	0–2	2–0	7–1
Léopold	1–2	2–6	3–1	0–3	2–2	1–7		1–3	1–3	1–1
Racing Bruxelles	10–0	3–2	4–0	5–0	3–1	5–1	5–0 (Note: Match awarded.)		3–1	4–1
Union SG	3–1	3–0	2–0	5–1	5–0	4–0	8–0	0–5		6–0
Liège	2–3	1–1	4–2	1–2	3–4	4–2	2–3	1–4	0–3	

Legend: Blue = home team win; Yellow = draw; Red = away team win.

== See also ==
- 1907–08 in Belgian football
