= List of protected heritage sites in Limbourg =

This table shows an overview of the protected heritage sites in the Walloon town Limbourg. This list is part of Belgium's national heritage.

Object	Year/architect	Town/section	Address	Coordinates	Number^{?}	Image
Chapel of Saint Anne ^{(nl)} ^{(fr)}		Limbourg		50.604559°N 5.934824°E	63046-CLT-0001-01 Info	Kapel Saint-Anne
Saint Georges Church ^{(nl)} ^{(fr)}		Limbourg		50.612636°N 5.941158°E	63046-CLT-0003-01 Info	Kerk Saint-Georges
Old walls or ramparts ^{(nl)} ^{(fr)}		Limbourg		50.616478°N 5.940180°E	63046-CLT-0004-01 Info	Oude wallen
house ^{(nl)} ^{(fr)}		Limbourg	rue Georges Wilson, n°32	50.620905°N 5.940061°E	63046-CLT-0005-01 Info	Huis: voorgevel, toegangspoort tot de binnenplaats en dakhelling voorzijde
house ^{(nl)} ^{(fr)}		Limbourg	rue Georges Wilson, n°34	50.620936°N 5.939986°E	63046-CLT-0006-01 Info	Huis: voorgevel, dakhelling voorzijde
Choir from the 15th century Church of Saint-Roch ^{(nl)} ^{(fr)}		Limbourg		50.624398°N 5.919377°E	63046-CLT-0007-01 Info	Koor uit de 15e eeuw van de kerk Saint-Roch
Church of Saint-Roch ^{(nl)} ^{(fr)}		Limbourg		50.624421°N 5.919506°E	63046-CLT-0008-01 Info	Kerk Saint-Roch
Church Saint-Lambert ^{(nl)} ^{(fr)}		Limbourg		50.606740°N 5.956269°E	63046-CLT-0010-01 Info	Kerk Saint-Lambert
Public pump ^{(nl)} ^{(fr)}		Limbourg	rue Derrière l'église.	50.611600°N 5.941157°E	63046-CLT-0011-01 Info	Openbare pomp
house ^{(nl)} ^{(fr)}		Limbourg	place Saint-Georges, n°36	50.612354°N 5.940067°E	63046-CLT-0012-01 Info	Huis: voorgevel, voorste gedeelte van het dak, muur, hek, poort, inrichting van de lounge naast de Place St-Georges
Road pavement and curbs (cobblestones) ^{(nl)} ^{(fr)}		Limbourg	place Saint-Georges	50.612206°N 5.940330°E	63046-CLT-0013-01 Info	Bestrating van de weg en de trottoirs
The wall around the garden and the gate of the poorhouse "Caldenborg Bardieus" ^{(nl)} ^{(fr)}		Limbourg	rue Derrière l'Eglise en gesitueerd aan de achterzijde van het gebouw aan Place Saint-Georges n°31	50.612484°N 5.940845°E	63046-CLT-0014-01 Info	De muur rondom de tuin en de poort van de armen "Caldenborg-Bardieus"
Walled garden ^{(nl)} ^{(fr)}		Limbourg		50.612478°N 5.940548°E	63046-CLT-0015-01 Info	Uitbreiding van de classificering van de muur rond de tuin, en de poort, gesitueerd aan de achterzijde van het gebouw aan Place Saint-Georges n°31, en het ensemble van deze, de gevels, dak en puntgevel
house ^{(nl)} ^{(fr)}		Limbourg	place Saint-Georges n°72	50.611443°N 5.940127°E	63046-CLT-0016-01 Info	Huis: hoofdgevel, voorzijde dak, bordes en muur
house ^{(nl)} ^{(fr)}		Limbourg	place Saint-Georges n° 33	50.612388°N 5.940693°E	63046-CLT-0017-01 Info	Huis: gevels en daken, en bijgebouw genaamd "magasin à munitions"
Former city hall ^{(nl)} ^{(fr)}		Limbourg	place Saint-Georges n°30	50.612524°N 5.940128°E	63046-CLT-0018-01 Info	Oude raadhuis: gevels en daken, uitgezonderd de lage aanbouw aan de achterzijde, en alle zichtbare elementen van Arvô (muren, plafond en plaveisel)
house ^{(nl)} ^{(fr)}		Limbourg	Sur les Remparts, n° 124	50.611113°N 5.939885°E	63046-CLT-0019-01 Info	Huis: straatgevel met bordes en twee dakpanelen
Wall along street and Provost's gate, up to the arms of "Mathias de Amezaga," and the wall perpendicular to the street ^{(nl)} ^{(fr)}		Limbourg	rue Derrière l'Eglise	50.613056°N 5.940856°E	63046-CLT-0020-01 Info	Muur aan straatzijde en poort van de provoost, naar de armen van "Mathias de Amezaga", en de muur loodrecht op de straat
house ^{(nl)} ^{(fr)}		Limbourg	place Saint-Georges n° 42	50.612158°N 5.940067°E	63046-CLT-0021-01 Info	Huis, muur van de tuin, portaal en paviljoen
castle of Villers (walls, roof gables) ^{(nl)} ^{(fr)}		Limbourg		50.633303°N 5.922401°E	63046-CLT-0022-01 Info	Exterieur van het oude gebouw van het kasteel van Villers (gevels, puntgevels en vier dakpanelen) en instelling ebschermingszone
Haute Ville Limbourg architecture ^{(nl)} ^{(fr)}		Limbourg		50.610956°N 5.939786°E	63046-PEX-0001-01 Info	Architecturaal ensemble van Ville Haute de Limbourg

== See also ==
- List of protected heritage sites in Liège (province)
- Limbourg
