= 1906–07 Belgian First Division =

12th season of top-tier football in Belgium

Belgian First Division
- Season: 1906–07

Statistics of Belgian First Division in the 1906–07 season.

== Overview ==
Location of teams in Belgian First Division 1906–07

It was contested by 10 teams, and Union Saint-Gilloise won the championship.

== League standings ==
| Pos | Team | Pld | W | D | L | GF | GA | GD | Pts | Relegation |
|---|---|---|---|---|---|---|---|---|---|---|
| 1 | Union Saint-Gilloise | 18 | 17 | 0 | 1 | 71 | 13 | +58 | 34 | |
| 2 | Racing Club de Bruxelles | 18 | 11 | 3 | 4 | 63 | 25 | +38 | 25 | |
| 3 | F.C. Brugeois | 18 | 11 | 2 | 5 | 36 | 21 | +15 | 24 | |
| 4 | Daring Club de Bruxelles | 18 | 10 | 3 | 5 | 47 | 18 | +29 | 23 | |
| 5 | Antwerp F.C. | 18 | 9 | 2 | 7 | 44 | 22 | +22 | 20 | |
| 6 | C.S. Brugeois | 18 | 7 | 3 | 8 | 32 | 33 | −1 | 17 | |
| 7 | Léopold Club de Bruxelles | 18 | 5 | 1 | 12 | 23 | 52 | −29 | 11 | |
| 8 | S.C. Courtraisien | 18 | 4 | 2 | 12 | 29 | 61 | −32 | 10 | |
| 9 | F.C. Liégeois | 18 | 5 | 0 | 13 | 25 | 65 | −40 | 10 | |
| 10 | C.S. Verviétois | 18 | 3 | 0 | 15 | 32 | 77 | −45 | 6 | Relegated to Promotion Division |

== Results ==
| Home \ Away | ANT | CSB | FCB | COU | DAR | LÉO | RCB | USG | FCL | VER |
|---|---|---|---|---|---|---|---|---|---|---|
| Antwerp | | 0–0 | 1–0 | 3–2 | 0–1 | 3–0 | 1–0 | 0–1 | 8–0 | 6–0 |
| CS Brugeois | 2–0 | | 0–0 | 1–1 | 0–1 | 0–1 | 5–2 | 0–2 | 5–1 | 6–0 |
| FC Brugeois | 2–0 | 5–0 | | 1–0 | 2–1 | 4–0 | 4–0 | 1–2 | 3–4 | 5–0 |
| Courtraisien | 1–2 | 2–3 | 1–3 | | 2–2 | 3–2 | 1–9 | 1–4 | 2–1 | 4–3 |
| Daring Club | 4–0 | 4–2 | 0–1 | 4–2 | | 5–0 (Note: Match awarded.) | 2–2 | 2–3 | 7–0 | 3–0 |
| Léopold | 1–5 | 1–2 | 0–0 | 5–1 | 2–1 | | 0–7 | 0–5 | 1–2 | 2–1 |
| Racing Bruxelles | 2–2 | 1–0 | 4–0 | 6–0 | 0–0 | 5–3 | | 0–2 | 2–0 | 8–0 |
| Union SG | 3–2 | 7–0 | 7–0 | 8–0 | 3–2 | 4–2 | 2–3 | | 8–0 | 5–0 |
| Liège | 2–1 | 3–6 | 0–1 | 2–4 | 1–3 | 2–0 | 3–5 | 0–2 | | 2–1 |
| Verviétois | 1–10 | 2–0 | 1–4 | 6–2 | 0–5 | 2–3 | 0–7 | 0–3 | 4–2 | |

Legend: Blue = home team win; Yellow = draw; Red = away team win.

== See also ==
- 1906–07 in Belgian football
