= William Nunnerley =

Welsh football referee and administrator (1865–1922)

Personal information
- Full name: William Nunnerley
- Date of birth: 1865
- Place of birth: Ellesmere, Shropshire, England
- Date of death: 10 February 1922 (aged 56–57)
- Place of death: Ellesmere, Shropshire, England
- Positions: Half-back; full-back

Senior career*
Years	Team	Apps	(Gls)
- Ellesmere
- Oswestry
	Chester St Oswalds	1	(0)
- * Club domestic league appearances and goals

William Nunnerley (1865 – 10 February 1922) was the Secretary of the Football Association of Wales (1903–05) and an international referee.

== Early life ==
Nunnerley was born in Ellesmere in 1865.

As a youth he played for Ellesmere and Oswestry.

== Career ==
Prior to becoming Secretary of the Football Association of Wales, Nunnerley was an elected council member of the FAW, he was a representative of Wrexham Victoria and Wrexham St Giles.

Nunnerley resigned as Secretary of the FAW in September 1905.

== Death ==
Nunnerley died in Ellesmere on 10 February 1922.
