= Edmond Van Staceghem =

Belgian footballer

International career
Years	Team	Apps	(Gls)
1910	Belgium	1	(1)

Edmond Van Staceghem was a Belgian footballer. He played in one match for the Belgium national football team in 1910.
