= Caius Welcker =

Dutch footballer

Personal information
- Full name: Jan Herman "Caius" Welcker
- Date of birth: July 9, 1885
- Place of birth: Alkmaar, Netherlands
- Date of death: February 13, 1939
- Place of death: Schiedam, Netherlands
- Position: Winger

Senior career*
Years	Team	Apps	(Gls)
- Quick

International career
1908–1912	Netherlands	15	(5)
Medal record
Bronze medal – third place	1908 London	Football
- * Club domestic league appearances and goals

Olympic medal record

Men's Football
Bronze medal – third place	1908 London	Team competition

Jan Herman "Caius" Welcker (9 July 1885 – 13 February 1939) was a Dutch football (soccer) player who competed in the 1908 Summer Olympics. He was born in Alkmaar and died in Schiedam.

Welcker, who formed the famous right wing of his club side Quick and the national team with Edu Snethlage, won 15 caps, scoring five times. He was a member of the Dutch team, which won the bronze medal in the football tournament.
