= 1909–10 in Belgian football =

Football in Belgium
- Season: 1909–10

The 1909–10 season was the 15th competitive season in Belgian football.

== Overview ==
Union Saint-Gilloise and F.C. Brugeois finished with the same number of points in the first division. A final game was thus organised to determine the champion, won by Union. FC Liégeois finished 12th and was relegated to the second division, and replaced by second division winner RC de Malines. Standard FC Liégeois played their first ever season in the top division of Belgian football.

== National team ==
Date	Venue	Opponents	Score*	Comp	Belgium scorers	Match Report
March 13, 1910	Olympisch Stadion, Antwerp (H)	The Netherlands	3-2 (aet)	F	Robert De Veen (2), Alphonse Six	FA website
March 26, 1910	Vélodrome de Longchamps, Brussels (H)	England amateur	2-2	F	Alphonse Six, Désiré Paternoster	FA website
April 3, 1910	Paris (A)	France	4-0	F	Alphonse Six (3), Robert De Veen	FA website
April 10, 1910	Haarlem (A)	The Netherlands	0-7	F		FA website
May 16, 1910	Duisburg (A)	Germany	3-0	F	Louis Saeys (2), Edmond Van Staceghem	FA website

* Belgium score given first

Key

- H = Home match
- A = Away match
- F = Friendly

== Honours ==
Competition	Winner
Division I	Union Saint-Gilloise
Promotion	RC de Malines

== Final league tables ==
=== Promotion ===
Pos	Team	Pld	Won	Drw	Lst	GF	GA	Pts	GD	Notes
1	RC de Malines	20	16	3	1	88	24	35	+64	Promoted to First Division.
2	AA La Gantoise	20	12	5	3	67	23	29	+44	
3	CS Verviétois	20	12	4	4	48	30	28	+18	
4	Uccle Sport	19	12	3	4	43	25	27	+18	
5	Stade Louvaniste	20	10	3	7	49	33	23	+16	
6	Tilleur FC	19	10	1	8	55	42	21	+13	
7	FC Malinois	20	7	4	9	45	42	18	+3	
8	US Tournaisienne	20	4	4	12	23	67	12	-44	
9	RC de Gand	20	4	3	13	28	50	11	-22	
10	SC de Theux	20	4	2	14	26	63	10	-37	
11	AS Anversoise	20	1	2	17	18	93	4	-44	
