= 2006–07 Club Brugge KV season =

Club Brugge KV
2006–07 season
- Manager: Emilio Ferrera (until 28 January); Čedomir Janevski
- Belgian First Division: 6th
- Belgian Cup: Winners
- UEFA Cup: Group stage
- Top goalscorer: Boško Balaban (16)

During the 2006–07 season, Club Brugge KV participated in the Belgian First Division.

== Season summary ==
Following a 0–1 home loss to Roeselare, coach Emilio Ferrera and assistant Franky Van der Elst were fired, with sports director Marc Degryse also resigning. Ex-player Čedomir Janevski was appointed as the new manager, leading Club Brugge to the Belgian Cup and UEFA Cup qualification. At the end of the season, Jacky Mathijssen was appointed head coach.

== Kits ==
Home	Away	Third (Note: Worn only for the away match against Genk on 19 November 2006, to adapt to Genk's completely blue home kit.)	Goalkeeper 1	Goalkeeper 2	Goalkeeper 3

== First-team squad ==
Squad at end of season

Note: Flags indicate national team as defined under FIFA eligibility rules; some limited exceptions apply. Players may hold more than one non-FIFA nationality.

No.	Pos.	Nation	Player
1	GK	BEL	Stijn Stijnen
2	DF	BEL	Olivier De Cock
3	MF	BEL	Sven Vermant
4	DF	BEL	Joos Valgaeren
5	DF	CAN	Michael Klukowski (Note: Klukowski was born in Amstetten, Austria, but was raised in Canada and represented them at U-20 and U-23 level before making his international debut for Canada in February 2003.)
6	DF	BEL	Philippe Clement
7	MF	BEL	Koen Daerden
8	MF	BEL	Gaëtan Englebert
9	FW	NGA	Manasseh Ishiaku
10	FW	CRO	Boško Balaban
11	MF	BEL	Jonathan Blondel
13	GK	BEL	Glenn Verbauwhede
15	DF	BEL	Tim Dreesen
16	MF	RSA	Elrio van Heerden

No.	Pos.	Nation	Player
17	DF	SRB	Ivan Gvozdenović
18	MF	CRO	Ivan Leko
19	FW	PER	Daniel Chávez
20	MF	SEN	Mustapha Diallo
21	DF	BEL	Jorn Vermeulen
23	GK	BEL	Yves Lenaerts
24	DF	DEN	Brian Priske
25	FW	GHA	Salou Ibrahim
26	DF	BEL	Birger Maertens
27	MF	BEL	Benjamin Lutun
28	DF	BEL	Brecht Capon
33	DF	BEL	Jason Vandelannoite
34	FW	BEL	Jeanvion Yulu-Matondo (Note: Yulu-Matondo was born in Kinshasa, Zaire (now Democratic Republic of the Congo), but also qualified to represent Belgium internationally and has represented them at U-16, U-17, U-18, U-19, and U-21 level.)

=== Left club during season ===
Note: Flags indicate national team as defined under FIFA eligibility rules; some limited exceptions apply. Players may hold more than one non-FIFA nationality.

No. / Pos. / Nation / Player; 14 / MF / BEL / Grégory Dufer (to Lokeren)	No. / Pos. / Nation / Player; 31 / MF / BEL / Kevin Roelandts (on loan to Germinal Beerschot)
