= Constant Feith =

Dutch footballer

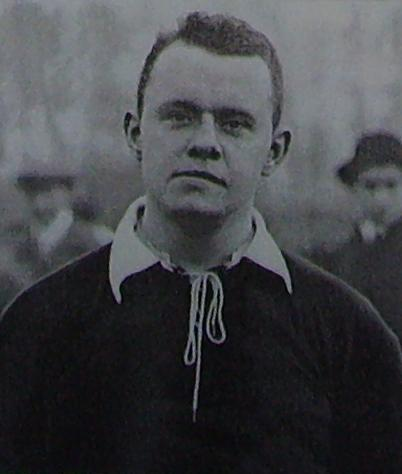

Personal information
- Full name: Constant Wilhelm Feith
- Date of birth: 3 August 1884
- Place of birth: The Hague, Netherlands
- Date of death: 15 September 1958 (aged 74)
- Place of death: Bennekom, Netherlands
- Positions: Striker; defender

Senior career*
Years	Team	Apps	(Gls)
1902–1903	LCFC Ajax		
1903–1920	HVV	350	(235)

International career
1906–1912	Netherlands	8	(2)
- * Club domestic league appearances and goals

Constant Feith
Medal record

Men's football

Representing Netherlands

Olympic Games
Bronze medal – third place	1912 Stockholm	Team competition

Jonkheer Constant Wilhelm Feith (August 3, 1884, in The Hague – September 15, 1958, in Bennekom) was a Dutch amateur football player who competed with great success in the 1912 Summer Olympics.

== Club career ==
He played the majority of his career for HVV, then the top side in The Hague, amassing a stunning 235 goals in 350 matches.

== International career ==
Feith made his debut for the Netherlands in an April 1906 match against Belgium and earned a total of 8 caps, scoring 2 goals. He was part of the incredible Dutch team, which won the bronze medal in the football tournament at the 1912 Summer Olympics. His final international was in July 1912 at the Olympics against Finland.

He also made it to the Netherlands national cricket team.

== Personal life ==
Feith was a judge by profession and worked in the Dutch East Indies, where he was detained by the Japanese during World War II.
