= Fernand Wertz =

Belgian footballer and coach

Personal information
- Full name: Ferdinand André Henri Joseph Wertz
- Date of birth: 29 January 1894
- Place of birth: Dolhain, Belgium
- Date of death: 28 November 1971 (aged 77)
- Position: Striker

Senior career*
Years	Team	Apps	(Gls)
1910–1928	Antwerp FC	262	(135)

International career
1913–1921	Belgium	5	(1)

Managerial career
- 1930–1934: K. Lyra
- 1938–1939: Antwerp FC
- 1942–1945: Standard de Liège
- 1948–1950: K. Lyra
- * Club domestic league appearances and goals

Fernand Wertz (29 January 1894 – 28 November 1971) was a Belgian football coach and striker. He was born in Dolhain.

He began to play by Dolhain FC in 1906 by youth team and two years later take Antwerp FC him over and make his debut in 1910–1911 with two goals in one game. Wertz played five times for Belgium, scoring one goal.

== International career ==
Wertz was a squad member of the Belgian team at the 1920 Summer Olympics.

== Career as coach ==
- 1930–1934: K. Lyra
- 1938–1939: Antwerp FC
- 1942–1945: Standard de Liège
- 1948–1950: K. Lyra
