= Franz Van Houtte =

Belgian footballer

Personal information
- Date of birth: 14 June 1890
- Place of birth: Bruges, Belgium
- Date of death: 28 December 1980 (aged 90)
- Place of death: Bruges, Belgium
- Positions: Midfielder; forward

Senior career*
Years	Team	Apps	(Gls)
1907–1925	CS Brugeois	150	(39)

International career
1911	Belgium	2	(1)
- * Club domestic league appearances and goals

Franz Van Houtte (14 June 1890 – 28 December 1980) was a Belgian footballer. He played in two matches for the Belgium national football team in 1911.

He spent his entire playing career with hometown club Cercle Sportif Brugeois.
