= Dolhain =

Coordinates: 50.61937°N 5.939°E

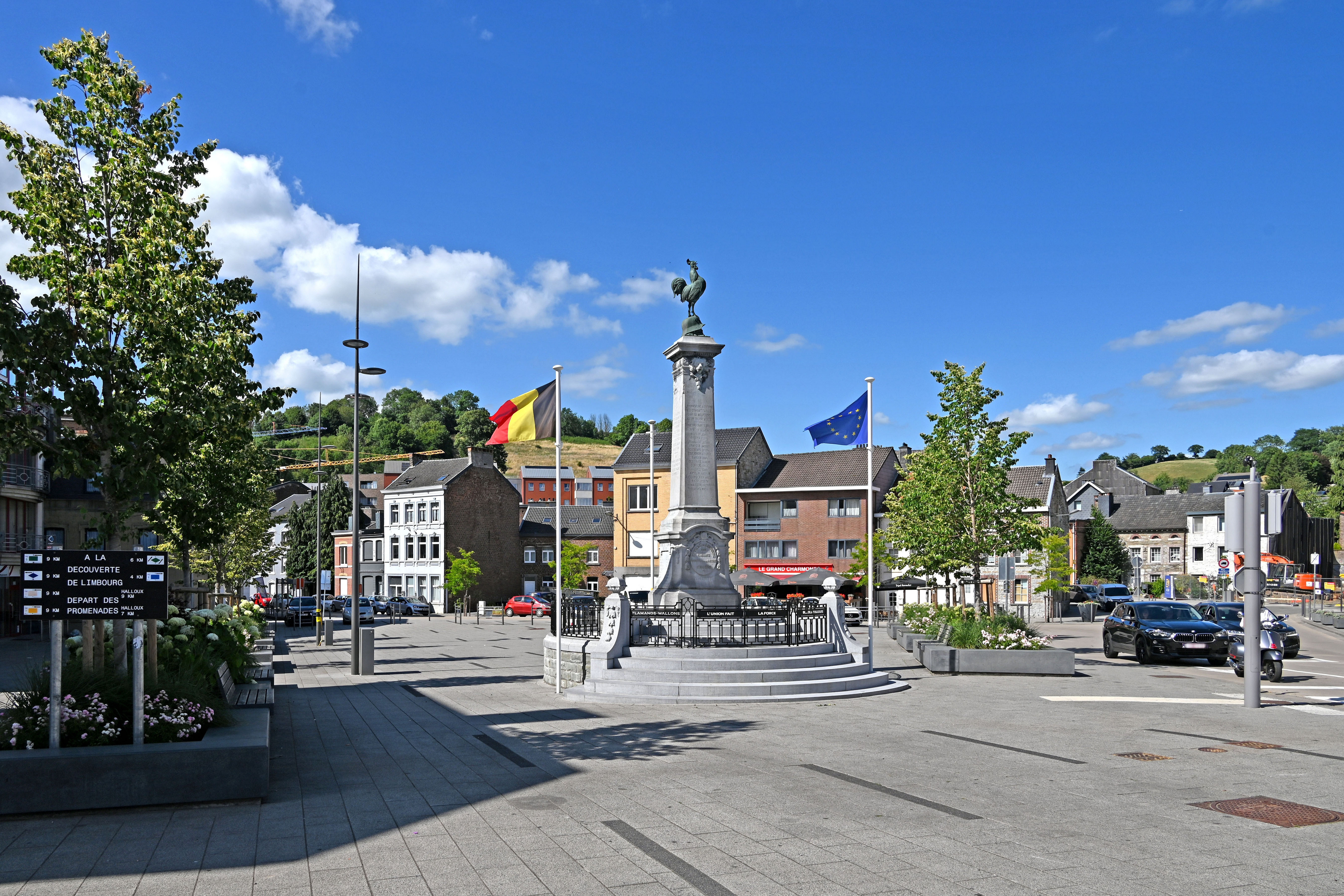

Dolhain (French pronunciation: [dɔlɛ̃]) is the industrial centre of the city of Limbourg, Wallonia, in the Belgian province of Liège.

It occupies the site of the lower town of the ancient city of Limbourg, which was destroyed by Louis XIV in 1675. On a rocky eminence above Dolhain are still to be seen the fine ruins of the old castle of Limbourg, the cradle of the ancient family of that name from which sprang the Luxemburg family and several emperors of Germany. The Gothic church of St George of the 13th century has been restored. At a short distance from Dolhain is the famous dam of the Gileppe, the vast reservoir constructed to supply Verviers with water free from lime for its cloth manufactures. The aqueduct from Gileppe to Verviers is about 80 km in length.
