= 2003–04 Club Brugge KV season =

Club Brugge
2003–04 season
- Manager: (Norway) Trond Sollied
- Stadium: Jan Breydel Stadium
- First Division: 2nd
- Belgian Cup: Winners
- Champions League: Group stage
- UEFA Cup: Fourth round
- Belgian Supercup: Winners
- Top goalscorer: Gert Verheyen (15)
- Average home league attendance: 23,716

During the 2003–04 Belgian football season, Club Brugge competed in the Belgian First Division.

== Season summary ==
Club Brugge failed to defend their title. Despite a famous win over reigning champions A.C. Milan, they also failed to progress from their Champions League group. A third-place finish in the group was enough for the club to continue their European campaign in the UEFA Cup, although they were soon knocked out in the fourth round.

== Kits ==
Home	Away	Goalkeeper 1	Goalkeeper 2	Goalkeeper 3

== First-team squad ==
Squad at end of season

Note: Flags indicate national team as defined under FIFA eligibility rules; some limited exceptions apply. Players may hold more than one non-FIFA nationality.

No.	Pos.	Nation	Player
1	GK	BEL	Dany Verlinden (captain)
2	DF	BEL	Olivier De Cock
3	MF	BEL	Timmy Simons (vice-captain)
4	DF	CZE	David Rozehnal
5	DF	BEL	Peter Van der Heyden
6	DF	BEL	Philippe Clement
7	FW	BEL	Gert Verheyen
8	MF	BEL	Gaëtan Englebert
9	FW	NOR	Bengt Sæternes
10	MF	SLO	Nastja Čeh
13	GK	CRO	Tomislav Butina
14	FW	CRO	Boško Balaban
15	DF	SVK	Marek Špilár
16	MF	UKR	Serhiy Serebrennikov
17	MF	SCG	Ivan Gvozdenović

No.	Pos.	Nation	Player
18	FW	PER	Andrés Mendoza
19	FW	NOR	Rune Lange
20	MF	ROU	Alin Stoica
21	MF	BEL	Sebastian Hermans
22	DF	BEL	Birger Van de Ven
23	GK	BEL	Stijn Stijnen
24	MF	BEL	Tim Smolders
25	DF	BEL	Hans Cornelis
26	DF	BEL	Birger Maertens
28	MF	BEL	Vincent Provoost
29	FW	BEL	Dieter Van Tornhout
30	FW	BRA	Victor Simões
31	MF	BEL	Kevin Roelandts
36	MF	BEL	Jonathan Blondel

== Reserve squad ==
Note: Flags indicate national team as defined under FIFA eligibility rules; some limited exceptions apply. Players may hold more than one non-FIFA nationality.

No.	Pos.	Nation	Player
—	GK	BEL	Glenn Verbauwhede
—	DF	BEL	Jason Vandelannoite

No.	Pos.	Nation	Player
—	MF	BEL	Bart Vlaeminck
—	FW	BEL	Jeanvion Yulu-Matondo

== Results ==
=== Champions League ===
==== Third qualifying round ====
13 August 2003	Club Brugge (Belgium)	2–1	(Germany) Borussia Dortmund	Jan Breydel Stadium, Bruges
20:30	Čeh 33'; Verheyen 44'	Report MatchCentre	Amoroso 53'	Referee: Pierluigi Collina (Italy)

27 August 2003	Borussia Dortmund (Germany)	2–1 (a.e.t.) (2–4 p)	(Belgium) Club Brugge	Westfalenstadion, Dortmund
20:30	Amoroso 3'; Ewerthon 86'	Report MatchCentre	Mendoza 26'	Referee: Mike RIley (England)
	Penalties
	Amoroso (penalty missed); Bergdølmo (penalty missed); Koller (penalty scored); Fernández (penalty scored)		(penalty scored) Simons; (penalty scored) Čeh; (penalty scored) De Cock; (penalty scored) Mendoza

Borussia Dortmund 3–3 Club Brugge on aggregate. Club Brugge won 4–2 on penalties.

==== Group stage ====
16 September 2003	Club Brugge (Belgium)	1–1	(Spain) Celta de Vigo	Jan Breydel Stadium, Bruges
20:45	Juanfran 84' (o.g.)	Report MatchCentre	Juanfran 50'	Referee: Georgios Kasnaferis (Greece)

1 October 2003	Ajax (Netherlands)	2–0	(Belgium) Club Brugge	Amsterdam Arena, Amsterdam
20:45	Sonck 11', 54'	Report MatchCentre		Referee: Graham Barber (England)

22 October 2003	Milan (Italy)	0–1	(Belgium) Club Brugge	San Siro, Milan
20:45		Report MatchCentre	Mendoza 33'	Referee: Tom Henning Øvrebø (Norway)

4 November 2003	Club Brugge (Belgium)	0–1	(Italy) Milan	Jan Breydel Stadium, Bruges
20:45		Report MatchCentre	Kaká 86'	Referee: Herbert Fandel (Germany)

26 November 2003	Celta de Vigo (Spain)	1–1	(Belgium) Club Brugge	Balaídos, Vigo
20:45	Mostovoi 74'	Report MatchCentre	Lange 90+2'	Referee: Éric Poulat (France)

9 December 2003	Club Brugge (Belgium)	2–1	(Netherlands) Ajax	Jan Breydel Stadium, Bruges
20:45	Lange 27'; Sæternes 84'	Report MatchCentre	Sonck 42' (pen.)	Referee: Domenico Messina (Italy)

=== UEFA Cup ===
==== Third round ====
26 February 2004	Club Brugge (Belgium)	1–0	(Hungary) Debrecen	Jan Breydel Stadium, Bruges
20:30	Lange 40'	Report		Referee: Emil Bozinovski (Macedonia)

3 March 2004	Debrecen (Hungary)	0–0	(Belgium) Club Brugge	Stadion Oláh Gábor Út, Debrecen
19:00		Report		Referee: Arturo Daudén Ibáñez (Spain)

Club Brugge won 1–0 on aggregate.

==== Fourth round ====
11 March 2004	Bordeaux (France)	3–1	(Belgium) Club Brugge	Stade Chaban-Delmas, Bordeaux
19:00	Celades 60', 71'; Riera 87'	Report	Verheyen 58'	Referee: Steve Bennett (England)

25 March 2004	Club Brugge (Belgium)	0–1	(France) Bordeaux	Jan Breydel Stadium, Bruges
19:30		Report	Chamakh 84'	Referee: Massimo De Santis (Italy)

Bordeaux won 4–1 on aggregate.

== Transfers ==
=== In ===
Summer

- Aminu Sani – (Belgium) R.W.D. Molenbeek – Return from loan
- José Duarte – (Belgium) R.W.D. Molenbeek – Return from loan
- Josip Šimić – (Greece) Aris Saloniki – Return from loan
- Ebrima "Ebou" Sillah – (Netherlands) RBC Roosendaal – Return from loan
- David Rozehnal – (Czech Republic) Sigma Olomouc – € 500,000 ,-
- Tomislav Butina – (Croatia) Dinamo Zagreb – Undisclosed
- Ivan Gvozdenović – (Serbia and Montenegro) Crvena Zvezda – Free transfer

Winter

- Victor Simões – (Belgium) Germinal Beerschot – € 800,000 ,-
- Jonathan Blondel – (England) Tottenham Hotspur – € 1,200,000 ,-
- Boško Balaban – (England) Aston Villa – Free transfer
- Vincent Provoost – Promoted to first team from youth academy
- Dieter Van Tornhout – Promoted to first team from youth academy

=== Out ===
Summer

- Kurt Delaere – (Belgium) K.M.S.K. Deinze – Undisclosed
- Aminu Sani – (Israel) Hapoel Be'er Sheva F.C. – Undisclosed
- José Duarte – (Israel) Hapoel Be'er Sheva F.C. – Undisclosed
- Ebrima "Ebou" Sillah – (Russia) Rubin Kazan – Free transfer
- Bratislav Ristić – (Ukraine) FC Metalurh Donetsk – Free transfer
- Koen Schockaert – (Belgium) Germinal Beerschot – Free transfer
- Tjörven De Brul – (Belgium) KAA Gent – Free transfer

Winter

- Josip Šimić – (South Korea) Ulsan HD – Free transfer
- Karel Geraerts – (Belgium) KSC Lokeren – Loan transfer
- Sandy Martens – (Belgium) KAA Gent – Free transfer
