= Joseph Thys =

Belgian footballer

Personal information
- Date of birth: 15 January 1888
- Date of death: 22 August 1942 (aged 54)

International career
Years	Team	Apps	(Gls)
1912–1919	Belgium	15	(1)

Joseph Thys (15 January 1888 – 22 August 1942) was a Belgian footballer. He played in 15 matches for the Belgium national football team from 1912 to 1919.
