= Jean Bouttiau =

Belgian footballer

Personal information
- Date of birth: 3 September 1889
- Date of death: 4 March 1957 (aged 67)

International career
Years	Team	Apps	(Gls)
1911–1912	Belgium	6	(1)

Jean Bouttiau (3 September 1889 – 4 March 1957) was a Belgian footballer. He played in six matches for the Belgium national football team from 1911 to 1912.
