= Louis Bessems =

Belgian footballer

Personal information
- Date of birth: 25 September 1892

International career
Years	Team	Apps	(Gls)
1913–1923	Belgium	13	(1)

Louis Bessems (born 25 September 1892, date of death unknown) was a Belgian footballer. He played in 13 matches for the Belgium national football team from 1913 to 1923.
