= Sylvain Brébart =

Belgian footballer (1886–1943)

Personal information
- Date of birth: 18 August 1886
- Place of birth: Belgium
- Date of death: 18 February 1943 (aged 56)
- Place of death: Anderlecht, Belgium
- Position: Forward

Senior career*
Years	Team	Apps	(Gls)
1910–1920	Daring Club de Bruxelles		
1920–1922	Anderlecht		

International career
1912–1914	Belgium	12	(8)
- * Club domestic league appearances and goals

Sylvain Brébart (18 August 1886 – 18 February 1943) was a Belgian footballer who played as a forward for Daring Club de Bruxelles and Anderlecht. He also scored 8 goals in 12 appearances for the Belgium national team.
