= Laurent Theunen =

Belgian footballer

International career
Years	Team	Apps	(Gls)
1905–1909	Belgium	4	(3)

Laurent Theunen was a Belgian footballer. He played in four matches for the Belgium national football team from 1905 to 1909, and scored three goals.
