= Fernand Nisot =

Belgian footballer

Olympic medal record

Men's Football
Gold medal – first place	1920 Antwerp	Team competition

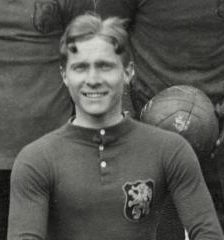
Fernand Nisot

Fernand Nisot (11 April 1895 – 31 July 1973) was a Belgian association football player who competed in the 1920 Summer Olympics. When he played the first time for the national soccer team, he was the youngest player ever: only 16 years and 19 days old. He was a member of the Belgian team that won the gold medal in the football tournament.
