= Charles Cambier =

Belgian footballer (1884–1955)

Personal information
- Date of birth: 5 January 1884
- Place of birth: Bruges, Belgium
- Date of death: 16 October 1955 (aged 71)
- Position: Midfielder

Senior career*
Years	Team	Apps	(Gls)
1901–1925	Club Brugge		

International career
1904–1914	Belgium	23	(3)
- * Club domestic league appearances and goals

Charles Cambier (5 January 1884 – 16 October 1955) was a Belgian footballer who played as a midfielder for Club Brugge. He also played for the Belgium national team, scoring 3 goals for 23 caps.
