= Stade du Vivier d'Oie =

Stadium in Brussels, Belgium

- Stadion de Ganzenvijver (Dutch)
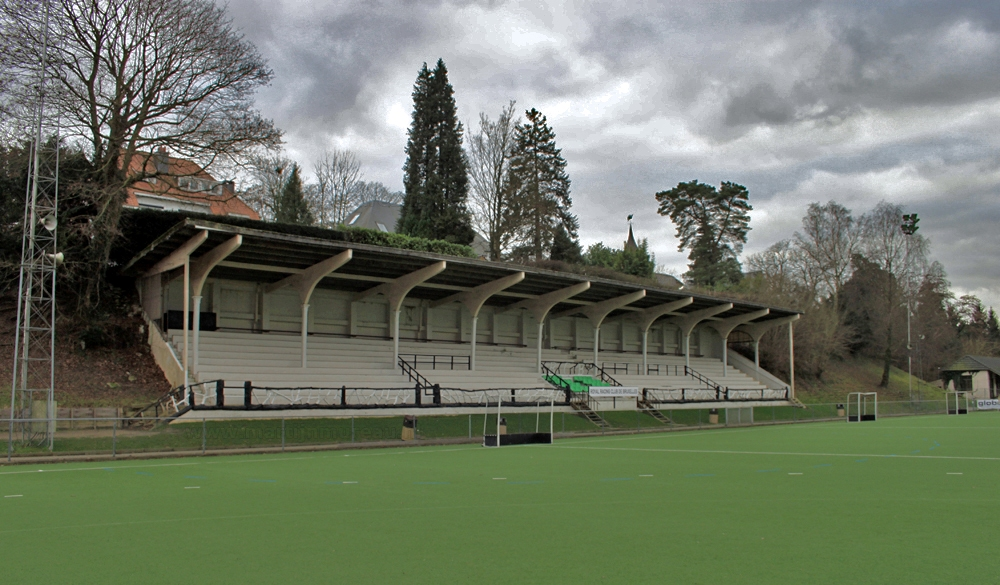
- The main stand of the Stade du Vivier d'Oie
- Interactive map of Stade du Vivier d'Oie
- Location: Drève des Gendarmes / Gendarmendreef 125, 1180 Uccle, Brussels-Capital Region, Belgium
- Coordinates: 50°47′36″N 4°22′40″E
- Owner: Racing Club de Bruxelles
- Operator: Racing Club de Bruxelles
- Capacity: 10,000
- Scoreboard: None

Construction
- Groundbreaking: 1901
- Built: 1902
- Opened: 1902

Tenants
- 1902–present: Racing Club de Bruxelles (other sport branches); 1902–1948: Racing Club de Bruxelles (football branch)

The Stade du Vivier d'Oie (Dutch: Stadion de Ganzenvijver), meaning "Goose Pond Stadium", is a stadium in the municipality of Uccle in Brussels, Belgium. The stadium lies in the Quartier Vivier d'Oie (Dutch: Diesdellewijk), at the margin of the Sonian Forest. In the first half of the 20th century, the football club Racing Club de Bruxelles played there.

== History ==
Racing Club de Bruxelles was founded at the end of the 19th century. The club played in Koekelberg in its early years and then moved to the Longchamps velodrome in Uccle. In 1901, the club, which was one of the top clubs in Belgium at the time, decided to build a new stadium, and in 1902, it moved to Vivier d'Oie, on the outskirts of the Sonian Forest. There, a stadium with a side building and club house were built. The main stand was made in reinforced concrete. This was an innovative technique for that time, which was only used in stadiums in England. It was one of the first covered stands that was not made of wood. The stadium was opened in 1902, and on 1 May 1904, the Belgium national football team played its first official football match against France (3–3).

After the First World War, the stadium also became a sports ground for field hockey. In 1923, a cottage was built, designed by the local architect Fritz Seeldraeyers. During the interbellum, the decorated concrete entrance gate was erected with the inscription "ROYAL RACING CLUB DE BRUXELLES".

After the Second World War, the club's football section was promoted to the highest football division, and the stadium could no longer handle the influx of spectators. Therefore, the club decided to move the athletics and football sections to the newly constructed Drie Linden Stadion in Watermael-Boitsfort. The football section ran into financial problems, and in 1963, it split from Racing Club de Bruxelles and merged with another club. The hockey and tennis sections continued to play in the Stade du Vivier d'Oie. In 1963, a new club house was built.

In 2010, the Belgian Government listed the sports complex as a protected monument.
