= Royal Excelsior Sports Club =

Belgian football club

- Full name: Royal Excelsior Sport's Club
- Founded: 1904
- Dissolved: 1935
Home colours	Away colours

Royal Excelsior Sport's Club was a Belgian football club from Brussels that played in the first division from 1908 to 1913.

== History ==
It was founded in 1904 as Excelsior S.C. de Bruxelles and it received the matricule n°20. It achieved its best ranking in 1909 and 1910 with a 7th place on 12. In 1913 it was relegated to the second division as it finished last with 2 points from 2 draws. It there played four consecutive seasons before a relegation to the third division. In 1929 the club changed its name to Royal Excelsior Sport's Club and it retired from football six seasons later. The field hockey section of the club is still alive as of 2005.
