= Royal Daring Club de Bruxelles =

Belgian football club

Daring Club de Bruxelles
- Full name: Royal Daring Club Molenbeek
- Nickname: Les Daringmen
- Founded: 1895
- Dissolved: 1973
- Ground: Stade Oscar Bossaert, Molenbeek-Saint-Jean
- Capacity: 12,266
Home colours	Away colours

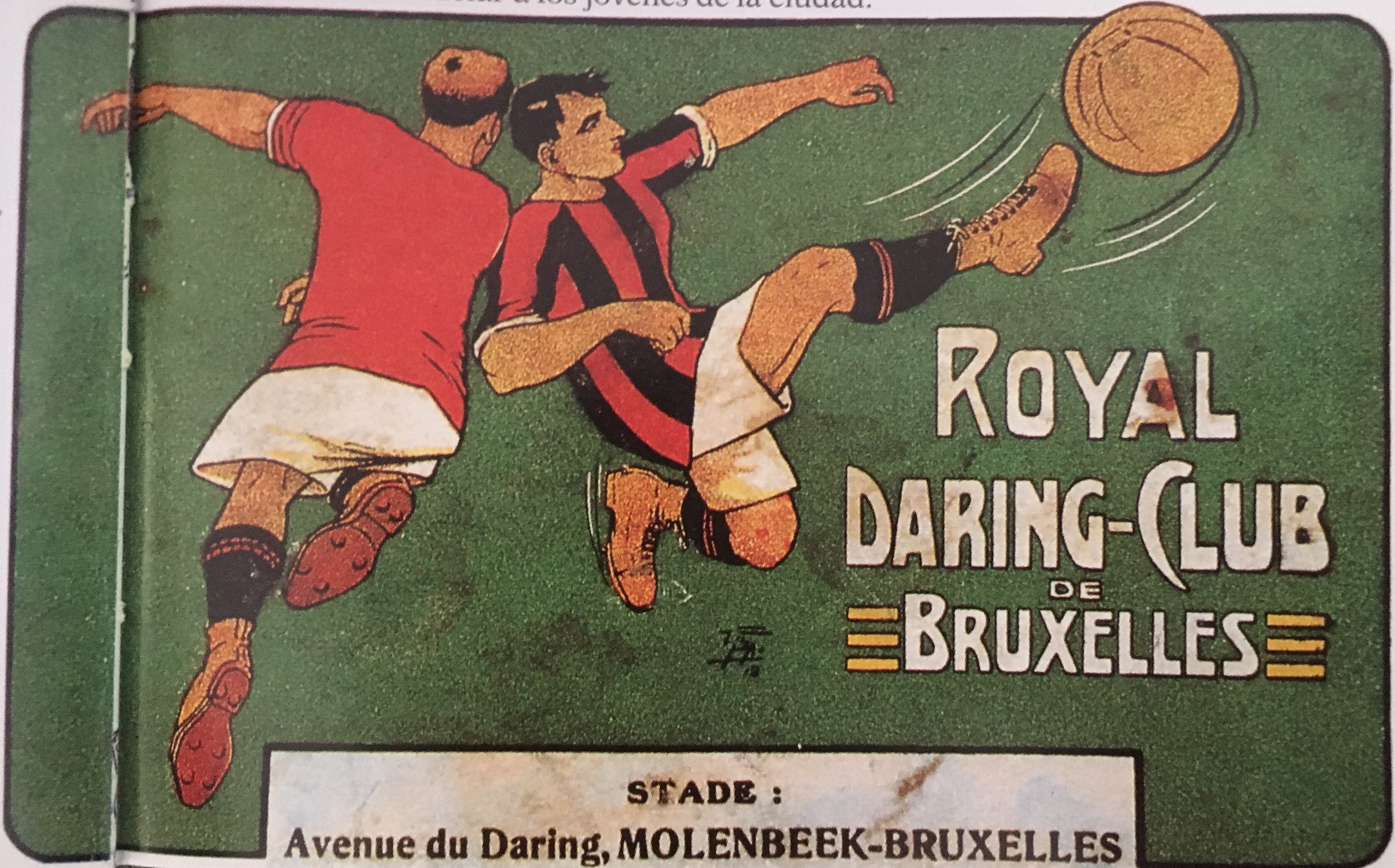
Poster for a match at the Royal Daring Club in Brussels, in 1912.

Royal Daring Club Molenbeek was a football team from the city of Brussels, Belgium until 1973 (53 years ago). It was created in 1895 (131 years ago) as Daring Club de Bruxelles and was the second club to register with the Belgian Football Association (it thus received the matricule number 2), but it was admitted to the league only in 1903.

== History ==
Daring Club de Bruxelles were formed in 1895 and consolidated its structure after absorbing other local clubs. In 1920, Daring CB found its new home ground in Molenbeek on West suburb of Greater Brussels. At the time the stadion received the name of "Oscar Bosschaert" (later "Charles Malis"). On same year, the club has been recognized as a "Royal Society" and became the Daring CB SR (Société Royale).

It had to wait until 1936 to come back at the top and win its fourth championship, and the fifth came a year later. In 1938, it finished 2nd. The next season saw a poor performance by Daring to finish 13th (forelast). The club was relegated just before the competition was stopped because of World War II. The team changed its name to Royal Daring Club de Bruxelles in 1950 (R. Daring CB). Twenty years later, the name was finally changed back to Royal Daring Club Molenbeek before the club stopped its activies, due to different difficulties, mainly financial. Due the choice of former R. Daring CM, matriculation n°47 Royal Racing White decided to move from Woluwe (in South-East of Brusssels suburb to Molenbeek and to become R.W.D. Molenbeek in 1973. There was neither merging, neither absorption. The club with number 47 simply added the name "Daring" to its name, with hope to draft back the fans of former matriculation n°2. This one was simply erased en 1973. The so called R.W.D.M was a Royal Society but never adds this mention in its name.

== Honours ==
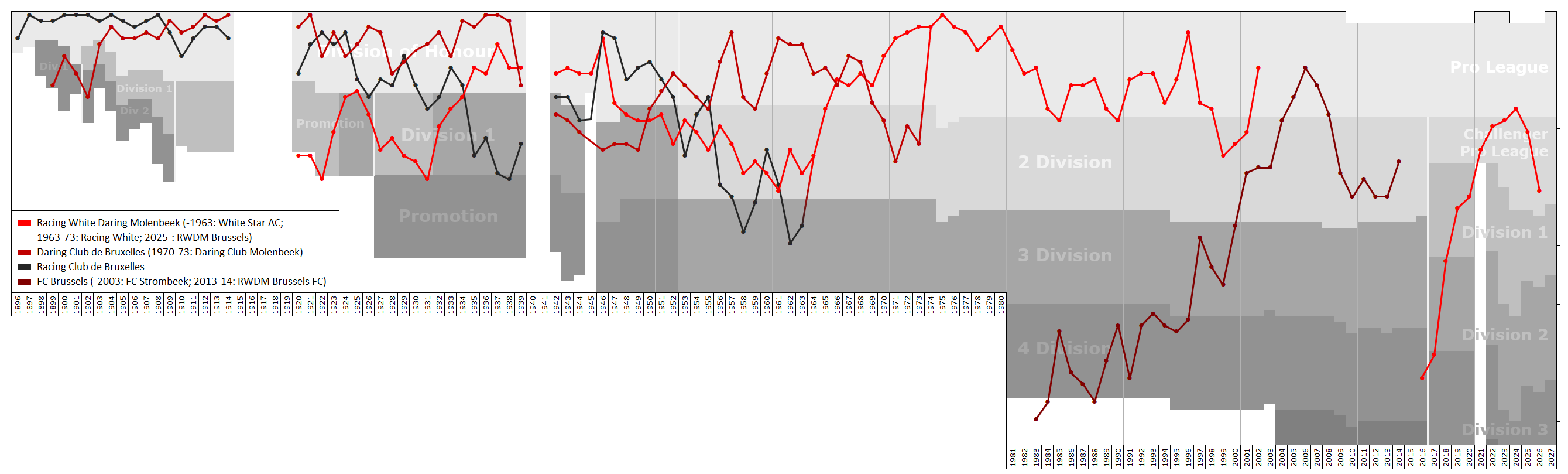
Historical league performance chart of RWDM and its predecessors, including Daring Club

- Belgian First Division
  - Champions: 1911–12, 1913–14, 1920–21, 1935–36, 1936–37
- Belgian Second Division
  - Winners: 1954–55, 1958–59
- Belgian Cup
  - Winners: 1934–35
  - Runners-up: 1969–70
- Coupe Jean Dupuich
  - Winners (2): 1923 and 1924 (shared)
  - Runner-up (4): 1912, 1914, 1920 and 1922

== European cup history ==
Season	Competition	Round	Country	Club	Home	Away	Aggregate
1965–66	Inter-Cities	1	(Sweden)	AIK Stockholm	1–3	0–0	1–3
1968–69	Inter-Cities	1	(Greece)	Panathinaikos	2–1	0–2	2–3
