= Évence Coppée Trophy =

- Event: Évence Coppée Trophy
Belgium	France
(Belgium)	(France)
3	3
- Date: 1 May 1904
- Venue: Stade du Vivier d'Oie, Uccle
- Referee: John C. Keene (England)
- Attendance: 1,500

The Évence Coppée Trophy (French: Trophée Évence Coppée) was a one-off competition comprising a single association football match in 1904 between Belgium and France. Held at the Stade du Vivier d'Oie in Uccle, Belgium, the match ended in a 3–3 draw.

The trophy was named after Évence Coppée, the Belgian patron who organised the match to promote Franco-Belgian friendship. Because the game ended in a tie, the trophy itself was not awarded.

== Historical context ==
The Évence Coppée Trophy marked the official debut of the French and Belgian national football teams and was also the first match between two independent European countries. It was the third official international football game in continental Europe, after the games between Austria and Hungary, and Hungary and Bohemia. It was the third official game between the sides of two independent countries, after matches between Argentina and Uruguay in 1902 and 1903.

Twenty days after the match, Belgium, France and five other European football associations founded the international association football federation, FIFA.

== Pre-match ==
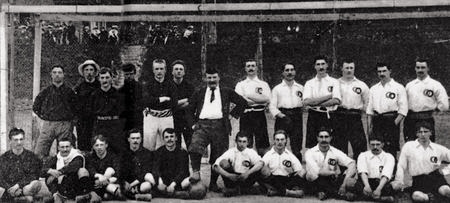
Pre-match photograph in front of a goal. Left: the Belgian team; right: the French team; centre: the referee John C. Keene, with the match ball

Both teams were selected by their National Football Association (with Belgian chairman Édouard de Laveleye and French chairman Robert Guérin) rather than by a national manager. Because of transportation difficulties and army enrollment, the French delegation was decimated. Since 1 May was not yet considered an international holiday, the French players had to ask for a day off from their employees. At least two French players (Louis Mesnier and Fernand Canelle) left their country without permission from their employers, and in French reports these two players were referred to using the respective pseudonyms "Didi" and "Fernand".

The French tactics were described as follows. "France play in a classical 2-3-5 formation: two backs, the two half-wingers (G. Bilot and especially C. Bilot) are defensive and hold the opponent's wingers, Davy is half-center. Finally, there are the five forwards. The 'exteriors' Mesnier and Filez who make a break, the 'interiors' are Royet (who is relay runner) and Cyprès and the powerful center (Garnier), who is also the playmaker."

France played in a white jersey with two rings from the Union des Sociétés Françaises de Sports Athlétiques (USFS), the former sports governing body in France, blue shorts, and red socks.

== The match ==
1 May 1904

Belgium	3–3	France
Quéritet 7', 50'; Destrebecq 65'		Mesnier 12'; Royet 13'; Cyprès 87'

Stade du Vivier d'Oie
Uccle, Belgium
Attendance: 1,500
Referee: John C. "Daddon" Keene (England)

Belgium	France

Squad :
GK Alfred Verdyck
BK Albert Friling
BK Edgard Poelmans
HW Guillaume Van Den Eynde
HC Charles Cambier
HW Camille Van Hoorden (c)
FW Max Tobias
FW Alexandre Wigand
FW Georges Quéritet
FW Pierre-Joseph Destrebecq
FW Charles Vanderstappen

Positions

- GK = Goalkeeper
- BK = Back
- HW = Half-winger
- HC = Half-center
- FW = Forward

Belgique-France 1904

Squad :
GK Maurice Guichard
BK Fernand Canelle (c)
BK Jules Verlet
HW Georges Bilot
HC Jacques Davy
HW Charles Bilot
FW Louis Mesnier
FW Marius Royet
FW Georges Garnier
FW Gaston Cyprès
FW Adrien Filez

Substitute:
Emile Fontaine

== Post-match ==
Despite scoring twice in this match, the Belgian striker Georges Quéritet was not selected again for the national side.

The Belgian goalkeeper Alfred Verdyck later became the secretary-general of the Belgian FA. Robert Guérin, the deputy of the French Football Association, became the first president of FIFA twenty days after this match.

== All Franco-Belgian encounters ==
Belgium and France have sustained a long-lasting rivalry since this first fixture, with 78 official matches played over more than a century.

The full record between the two countries is as follows:

Competition	Played	Results			Goals	
Competition	Played	Belgium	France	Draw	Belgium	France
Friendly*	62	27	19	16	141	103
World Cup qualifiers	4	1	2	1	7	9
World Cup	3	0	3	0	3	8
European Championship qualifiers	4	2	0	2	5	3
European Championship	2	0	2	0	0	6
Nations League	3	0	3	0	3	7
TOTAL	78	30	29	19	159	133

*Including two friendly matches at minor tournaments: the Évence Coppée Trophy in 1904 (3–3), and a 1–0 victory for France at the King Hassan II Tournament in 1998.

== See also ==
- List of first association football internationals per country
- Belgium national football team
- France national football team
- History of the France national football team
