= History of the France national football team =

The history of the France national football team dates back to 1904. The national team, also referred to as Les Bleus, represents the nation of France in international football. It is fielded by the French Football Federation and competes as a member of UEFA.

France was one of the four European teams that participated at the inaugural World Cup in 1930 and was one of eight national teams to have won the competition, which they did in 1998 when they hosted the cup. They defeated Brazil 3–0 in the final. France has won two World Cups, one in 1998, another in 2018. France has also won two UEFA European Championships, first in 1984, led by Ballon d'Or winner Michel Platini, and then in 2000, led by FIFA World Player of the Year Zinedine Zidane. Following France's 2001 Confederations Cup victory, they became, along with Germany, Brazil and Argentina, the only national teams to win the FIFA World Cup, the FIFA Confederations Cup, and the Olympic Tournament. They also won the UEFA Nations League in 2021.

== Early years ==
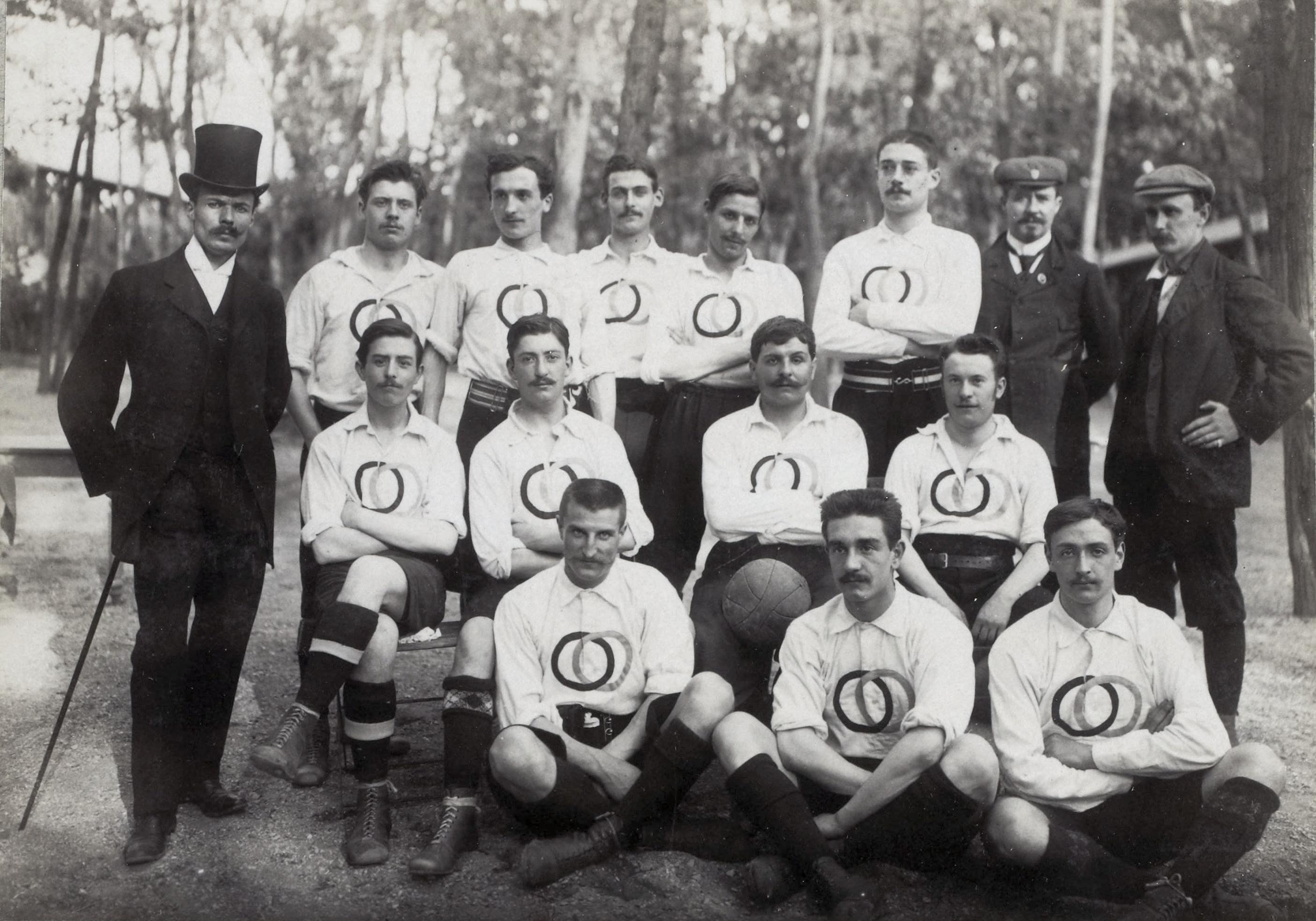
USFSA France team at 1900 Summer Olympics

A France national team played in the 1900 Olympics under the name of USFSA XI, or Club Français. They finished second. The team was officially created in 1904 around the same time of FIFA's foundation on 21 May 1904. Before FIFA's creation, France contested international matches under the Union des Sociétés Françaises de Sports Athlétiques (USFSA), the now-defunct French sports union. In preparation for the 1900 Summer Olympics held in Paris, the USFSA formed a national team composed of players from French clubs. The USFSA team eventually earned the silver medal following an 0–4 defeat in the gold medal match to Upton Park F.C., who were representing Great Britain. Between the years 1900 and 1904, under USFSA authority, France contested five matches, one against Belgium, a 6–2 victory and four against England, all defeats.

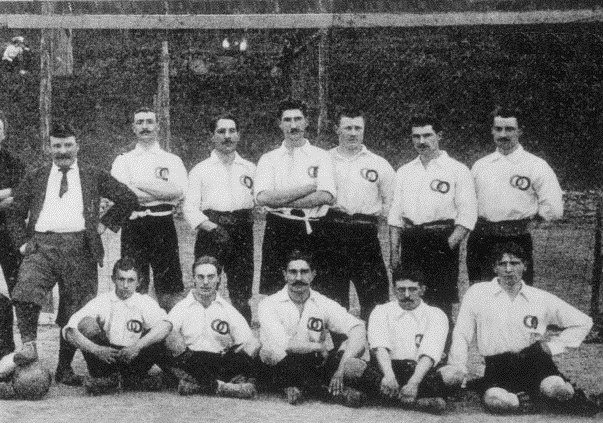
France posing before their first match ever, 1 May 1904

France's first ever game was held on 1 May 1904 in a match against Belgium that ended in a 3–3 draw. The match was played at the Stade du Vivier d'Oie in Uccle (Brussels) and the three French goals came from Louis Mesnier, Marius Royet, and Gaston Cyprès. On 12 February 1905, France contested their first home match against Switzerland, played at the Parc des Princes in front of 500 supporters. France won the match 1–0 with the only goal coming from Cyprès. Later that year, France returned to Brussels to face Belgium and lost 0–7. In the return match, played a year later on 22 April 1906 in Saint-Cloud, France again lost 0–5 to the Belgians. On 11 November, France were defeated 0–15 by England before defeating Belgium 2–1.

On 7 June 1908, a FIFA delegation ruled that the USFSA still had control of the France national team for Olympic competition. Due to this, France had to send two teams, called France A and B, to the 1908 Summer Olympics in London, a rare occurrence. The main difference between the teams, other than the players, were that France A, who were controlled by FIFA, matches would be recorded as official matches and France B, who were controlled by the USFSA, matches would not. The teams arrived in the city on the same day as the matches, following an extensive journey by boat and train from France. France B were eliminated in the quarter-finals following an 0–9 defeat by Denmark, while France A went out in the semi-finals to the same team following a 1–17 crushing, in which Sophus Nielsen scored a record ten goals. Following the Olympics, on 9 May 1908, the French Interfederal Committee (CFI), a rival organisation to the USFSA, ruled that FIFA would now be responsible for the club's appearances in forthcoming Olympic Games and not the USFSA. As a founding member of the International Olympic Committee (ICO), the USFSA disagreed with the ruling and, despite having three years to reach an agreement, the two organisations failed to, which led to France not sending a football team to the 1912 Summer Olympics. Due to numerous disagreements with FIFA and the IOC, the USFSA eventually became disorganised and in 1913, became semi-affiliated with the CFI. In 1919, the CFI transformed themselves into the Fédération Française de Football or French Football Federation.

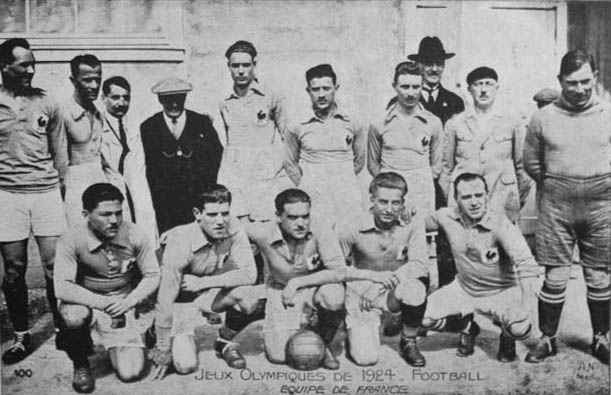
France at the 1924 Summer Olympics.

Following the creation of the FFF, the national team developed stability. Their first official match under the federation's watch was against Belgium on 9 March 1919. The match ended in 2–2 draw with both of France's goals coming from Gabriel Hanot. One of the country's biggest victories during this era was a 2–1 victory over England. The victory was France's first over England after having contested over ten matches against them, all England wins. In 1921, the USFSA finally merged with the French Football Federation. The merger effectively put an end to the difficult process of selecting players for the national team since the FFF were now the sole selector. As a result, federation members Gaston Barreau, Jean Rigal, Maurice Delanche, and Jacques Caudron formed a selection committee to oversee the selection process of the players. Barreau also was installed as the unofficial manager of the team.

In 1923, the national team lost six consecutive matches, including a 1–2 defeat by Spain and a 1–9 thrashing from the Netherlands in Amsterdam. The win-less streak ended on 13 January 1924 with a 2–0 victory over Belgium in Paris. France then lost to both Switzerland in March and England in May in preparation matches for the 1924 Summer Olympics. At the Games, France reached the second round, following a 7–0 victory over Latvia, before falling 1–5 to Uruguay. Four years later at the 1928 Summer Olympics, France failed to advance past the first round losing to Italy 3–4.

== Birth of the World Cup ==
In July 1930, France appeared in the inaugural FIFA World Cup, in Uruguay. France was the only group with four teams, along with Argentina, Mexico, and Chile. In their first World Cup match, France defeated Mexico 4–1 at the Estadio Pocitos in Montevideo. Lucien Laurent scored not only France's first World Cup goal, but the first goal in World Cup history. In the 40th minute, Marcel Langiller scored the second goal in World Cup history, a minute before Bart McGhee's goal for the United States against Belgium. Despite the dream start, France were beaten by the eventual group winners Argentina losing 0–1 after a goal by Luis Monti in the 81st minute. They later lost by the same scoreline to Chile.

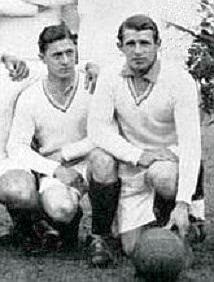
Lucien Laurent and Marcel Langiller at the inaugural World Cup

A month after the World Cup, France returned to South America to face Brazil in Rio de Janeiro. Despite leading after 20 minutes, with goals from Edmond Delfour, France failed to hold the lead following goals from Arthur Friedenreich and Heitor Dominguez, with the latter scoring two. The following year, France earned back-to-back victories over Germany (1–0) and England (5–2). Both matches were played in Colombes at the Stade Olympique Yves-du-Manoir, which had become the nation's national stadium, alongside the Parc des Princes. Raoul Diagne, who was of Senegalese descent and the first black player to play for France, earned his first cap on 15 February 1931 in a 1–2 defeat by Czechoslovakia. He later played with the team at the 1938 FIFA World Cup, alongside Larbi Benbarek, who was the first player of North African origin to play for the national team. In June 1932, the national team toured the Balkans where they faced Yugoslavia, Bulgaria, and Romania. France finished the trip with one victory and two losses with their only win coming against the Bulgarians (5–3), courtesy of a hat trick from Jean Sécember.

On 15 April 1934, France began qualification for the 1934 FIFA World Cup by beating Luxembourg 6–1 in Luxembourg City. The victory meant qualification for the World Cup where France faced Austria in the first round. The group stage used in the first World Cup was discarded in favour of a straight knockout tournament. In the match, which went to extra time, France lost 2–3 following extra time goals from Anton Schall and Josef Bican. On the team's return to Paris, they were greeted as heroes by a crowd of over 4,000 supporters. In the first match following the World Cup defeat, France defeated Yugoslavia 3–2 in front of 37,000 supporters at the Parc des Princes.

As hosts of the 1938 FIFA World Cup, France automatically qualified for the competition. In the first round, France faced long-time rivals Belgium and defeated them 3–1, with two goals from Jean Nicolas and one of the fastest goals scored in World Cup history by Émile Veinante. In the quarter-finals, France faced defending champions Italy, who beat them 1–3. Italy later defended their title defeating Hungary 4–2 in the final.

Due to World War II, FIFA suspended both the 1942 and 1946 FIFA World Cups. National team play was put on hold, returned, then was put on hold for a second time before finally returning on a permanent basis following the conclusion of the war. The first suspension of play lasted from 29 January 1940, following France's 3–2 victory over Portugal, until 8 March 1942 when France returned to play losing 0–2 to Switzerland. France contested one more match, a 0–4 defeat by Spain, before play was suspended again on 16 March 1942. France returned to play on Christmas Eve 1944 defeating Belgium 3–1 in Paris.

== The Golden generation of the 1950s ==
Following the war, FIFA re-instated the World Cup and France played Yugoslavia for a place in the 1950 FIFA World Cup. The first two matches the teams played, on 10 and 31 October, ended in 1–1 draws, so FIFA announced that a play-off on neutral ground in December would be played. To prepare themselves for the match, France faced and defeated Czechoslovakia 1–0 in November. In the play-off match, held at the Stade Giovanni Berta in Florence, Italy, France lost 2–3 following an extra time goal from Željko Čajkovski, thus being eliminated from qualification.

France got revenge on 2 February 1951, defeating Yugoslavia 2–1. The 1950s saw the arrival of Just Fontaine, Raymond Kopa, Jean Vincent, Robert Jonquet, Maryan Wisnieski, Thadée Cisowski, and Armand Penverne to the national team. The majority of the national team consisted of players from French clubs Lille, Saint-Étienne, and Stade Reims, with the last being at the zenith of their historic strength during this period. Led by captains Jean Baratte and Roger Marche, France went on a six-match unbeaten streak beginning on 20 April 1952 following a 2–0 victory over Portugal. During the streak, France faced West Germany and defeated them 3–1. The streak came to an end on Christmas Day 1952 with a 0–1 loss to Belgium. France cruised through the qualifying process for the 1954 FIFA World Cup as they were grouped with the Republic of Ireland and Luxembourg. They went undefeated in the group scoring 20 goals and conceding only four. At the World Cup, which was held in Switzerland, the group stage of the competition returned and France were placed with Brazil, Yugoslavia and Mexico, though they only had to play the latter two. In their opening match against Yugoslavia, France lost 0–1. They were victors in the second match defeating Mexico 3–2, but were unable to advance to the next round due to their head-to-head result with Yugoslavia, who advanced.

=== 1958 World Cup ===
Following the World Cup, France went on an eight-match unbeaten streak defeating the likes of Germany, Spain, England, and Sweden. The consistent play from the team led to the team again cruising through qualification for the 1958 FIFA World Cup in Sweden. France, for the second consecutive qualification, went undefeated scoring 19 goals and conceding only 4. Of the 19 goals scored, Racing de France striker Thadée Cisowski scored seven including five in the 6–3 defeat of Belgium. At the 1958 World Cup, the team finished in third place. In the group stage, France again faced Yugoslavia, but were given unfamiliar opposition in Paraguay and Scotland. In the opening match against Paraguay, France got a 7–3 victory, with Reims striker Just Fontaine getting a hat trick. In the match against Yugoslavia, they were defeated 2–3 with Fontaine scoring both of his team's goals. The 2–1 victory over Scotland was enough to win the group and advance to the knockout rounds, a first for France. In the knockout rounds, France beat Northern Ireland 4–0 with Fontaine recording another two goals. In the semi-finals, France were unable to contain the resilient Brazilians, in part due to an injury to the influential defender Robert Jonquet. Brazil, who won the match 5–2, controlled most of the match with Pelé scoring a hat trick. In the third place match, France defeated West Germany 6–3 with Fontaine recording four of the goals, which brought his goal tally to 13, a World Cup record which still stands.

=== UEFA Euro 1960 ===
Following France's successful World Cup campaign, they were put into qualification for the inaugural UEFA European Football Championship, which was held on home soil. The club's first leg of their qualifying match was a 7–1 dominating win over Greece with Raymond Kopa, now of Real Madrid fame, scoring. Fours days later, France travelled to Vienna and defeated Austria 2–1. In the return leg against Greece, France drew 1–1, thus advancing 8–2 on aggregate. In the next round, France faced Austria again. In the first leg, France scored the first three goals en route to a 5–2 victory and, in the return leg, beat the Austrians 4–2. The 9–4 aggregate scoreline meant qualification. In the 1960 European Nations' Cup, France, who were without Kopa, Fontaine, and Roger Piantoni, faced Yugoslavia and were shocked 4–5 despite being up 4–2 by the 75th minute. The Plavi scored three goals in a span of four minutes to take the lead and become victors. They later lost in the final to the Soviet Union. In the third place match, France were defeated 0–2 by Czechoslovakia.

== Decline (1960–1976) ==
The new decade saw the departure of veterans Robert Jonquet, Just Fontaine, Armand Penverne, Roger Marche, Raymond Kaelbel, and Jean Vincent who all retired from the national team. Only Maryan Wisnieski, Roger Piantoni, Jean-Jacques Marcel, André Lerond, and Raymond Kopa remained from the team that finished third at the 1958 FIFA World Cup. On 25 April 1964, Henri Guérin was officially installed as the team's first manager. Following their 4th-place finish at the 1960 European Championship, Guérin was tasked with qualifying for the 1962 FIFA World Cup. The team started off defeating Finland 2–1 in Helsinki and Bulgaria 3–0 in Paris. Following another victory (5–1) over Finland, France were thought to have secured qualification, but following Bulgaria's 3–1 victory over Finland, the two teams became levelled on points. FIFA ordered a play-off on neutral ground. In the play-off, played in Milan at the San Siro, France were beaten by Bulgaria 0–1. Following their elimination, Kopa, Piantoni, and Marcel retired from the national side.

In the team's following match after the Bulgaria defeat, they were defeated 1–3 by Poland. After another loss to Italy, France were thrust into qualification for the 1964 European Nations' Cup. In the preliminary round, France faced England. In the first leg at Hillsborough Stadium in Sheffield, France secured a 1–1 draw and in the second leg, defeated the English 5–2 with Lucien Cossou and Wisnieski scoring a double. In the next round, France played Bulgaria. Despite losing 0–1 to Bulgaria in Sofia, France rebounded in Paris winning 3–1, which meant a 3–2 aggregate victory and progression to the next round where they faced Hungary. In the first leg at the Stade Olympique Yves-du-Manoir, France lost 1–3 with their only goal coming from Cossou when they were trailing 0–3. The second leg was also won by the Hungarians, despite France getting an early goal from the naturalised international Nestor Combin. The defeat by Hungary meant another major tournament qualification failure.

France returned to major international play following qualification for the 1966 FIFA World Cup. The team was in a relatively easy group consisting of a now weakened Yugoslavia, Norway, and Luxembourg. France won five of their group stage matches and losing only one, a 0–1 defeat by Yugoslavia in Belgrade. France struggled against higher opposition in friendly matches going win-less in six friendly matches heading into the World Cup. In the tournament, which was played in England, France finished last in their group which included England, Mexico, and Uruguay. A 1–1 draw with Mexico, marred by bad refereeing, and a 1–2 loss to Uruguay saw France still with a chance to make the knockout rounds. In the final group stage match against England, France lost 0–2 in front of a crowd of 98,000 at Wembley Stadium. The loss eliminated France from the competition. As a result, manager Henri Guérin was sacked.

Guérin was replaced by José Arribas and Jean Snella who worked in a dual role until being replaced by former international Just Fontaine. Fontaine initially started the club's qualification for UEFA Euro 1968, but was let go and succeeded by Louis Dugauguez. Under Dugauguez, France failed to qualify for the tournament, due to their 2–6 aggregate defeat by Yugoslavia in the quarter-final stage of qualifying. Despite the negative reaction from supporters, Dugauguez was retained and managed the team during the early stages of the team's qualifying campaign for the 1970 FIFA World Cup. In the team's opening qualifying match, played in Strasbourg, an injury-plagued France suffered embarrassment following a 0–1 defeat by Norway, who had a team composed of mostly amateurs. In their next match, the team drew with Hungary 2–2, which led to calls for Dugauguez to be replaced. On 2 March 1969, the outcry proved successful with Georges Boulogne replacing Dugauguez. In Boulogne's first match in charge, France were hammered 0–5 by England in a friendly.

Boulogne continued the team's qualification campaign, but lost 0–3 to Sweden in Stockholm. Despite defeating Sweden 2–0, France were unable to advance due to their earlier defeat by Sweden. Boulogne would last at his post until 1973 following his failure to qualify for the 1974 FIFA World Cup. Boulogne also failed to get the team to UEFA Euro 1972. Despite the negatives, Boulogne is positively remembered for reconstructing French football with the nation now putting more emphasis on training and providing more international opportunities for young players, instead of constantly relying on the old guard. Boulogne was replaced by Ștefan Kovács, who became the first and, to this day, only international manager to ever manage the France national team. (Arribas was born in Spain, but was a naturalised French citizen) Kovacs applied Boulogne's concepts to his total football philosophy, but failed to qualify for the 1974 FIFA World Cup and UEFA Euro 1976. After two years in charge, he was sacked and replaced by Michel Hidalgo.

== Platini era ==
Hidalgo's first match in charge, a 2–2 draw with Czechoslovakia on 27 March 1976, coincided with the debuts of several players he later used for future triumphs, including Michel Platini, who scored, Didier Six, who appeared as a substitute, and Maxime Bossis. Hidalgo's first task as manager was to achieve qualification to the 1978 FIFA World Cup. France accomplished this following a 3–1 win over Bulgaria at the Parc des Princes with Dominique Rocheteau, Michel Platini and Christian Dalger Scoring. Following qualification, France scheduled strong competition in friendly matches ahead of the World Cup. In 1977, the team, led by Platini, Dominique Rocheteau and Marius Trésor, travelled to Buenos Aires where they drew 0–0 with Argentina, who were due to be the 1978 World Cup hosts and four days later, drew 2–2 with Brazil at the Estádio do Maracanã in front of 83,535 fans. Despite trailing 0–2 in the second half, France recovered with goals from Six and Trésor, who scored his in the 85th minute. Other future World Cup opponents France faced in the lead up to the tournament included Italy in Naples (2–2 draw with Platini scoring two free kicks), Tunisia (2–0 victory), and Brazil, again, this time at the Parc des Princes. France recorded a 1–0 victory with Platini scoring the goal. Over 43,000 supporters turned out for the match. Heading into the World Cup, France were on a ten-match unbeaten streak. The streak came to an end in the team's first group stage match when they lost 1–2 to Italy. Bernard Lacombe scored the opening goal of the match in the first minute but Marco Tardelli's was effective in marking Platini. In the following match against hosts Argentina, France were beaten 1–2 with Platini scoring France's goal. The loss eliminated France from the competition. France did not finish at the bottom of the table due to defeating Hungary 3–1 in the final group stage match. Many attributed the team's weak performance to the team's lack of experience with only two players, Henri Michel and Trésor, having more than 20 caps to their name.

Almost immediately after the World Cup exit, France began the qualification process for UEFA Euro 1980. France played Sweden, Czechoslovakia, and Luxembourg. France opened their campaign drawing with Sweden 2–2, a draw the team would later come to regret. In their third match, they were beaten 0–2 by the Czechs in Bratislava. The team failed to qualify by one point.

=== 1982 FIFA World Cup ===
1980 saw the arrival of Jean Tigana to the national team with the player making his debut in the team's 0–1 loss to the Soviet Union on 23 May in Moscow. The arrival of Tigana completed the initial Magic Square, which was composed of Tigana, Platini, Giresse, and Genghini. Due to their qualification elimination from the Euros, France and new captain Platini were eager to begin their qualifying season for the 1982 FIFA World Cup. They opened their campaign with a 7–0 romp of Cyprus with Platini and Lacombe scoring two each. Two weeks later, the team recorded a 2–0 win over the Republic of Ireland. France lost three away matches in qualifying, the first being to Netherlands 0–1 in Rotterdam, the second, a 0–2 loss to Belgium in Brussels, and finally a 2–3 defeat by Ireland in Dublin. Due to the team maintaining its home form, France finished in second place, behind Belgium, thus qualifying for the World Cup.

Prior to the tournament, France continued to perform badly away from home, losing to both Spain and West Germany in Madrid and Hanover, respectively. The team played all of its World Cup preparation matches at home, unlike in 1978. At the tournament, France faced Czechoslovakia, England, and Kuwait in the first group stage. In their first game France were broken down by the English in the second half after going into halftime even 1–1. England got goals from Bryan Robson (second of the match) and Paul Mariner to seal the result. France's beat Kuwait 4–1 in the second match with Bossis, Platini, and Six all getting on the scoresheet. The final group stage match saw France get a 1–1 draw with the Czechs. The draw allowed France to finish second and move on the next round of group stage matches where they were in a group with Austria and Northern Ireland. As expected, France won the group defeating Austria 1–0 and Northern Ireland 4–1 in Madrid (with Alain Giresse and Dominique Rocheteau scoring two each), which meant the team had reached the semi-finals.

In the semi-finals, France played West Germany, who had defeated France 1–4 a few months prior, in Seville. The match proved to be one of the greatest matches of World Cup history. Other than the scoreline, the match was primarily remembered for German goalkeeper Harald Schumacher knocking defender Patrick Battiston unconscious in the 57th minute following an attempt at a save. Battiston suffered a damaged vertebra, lost teeth, and later slipped into a coma. Despite the extensiveness of the injury, the referee did not call a penalty or even penalise Schumacher, much to the anger of the French. The match eventually went into extra time at 1–1 with Platini converting a penalty for France and Pierre Littbarski scoring for Germany in regular time. In extra time, France scored two goals in succession with Trésor scoring the first off a Giresse free kick and Giresse scoring the second from 18 metres out. Four minutes later, Germany got back-to-back goals to even the match again. The match now even at 3–3 went to a penalty shoot-out. The Germans earned their spot in the final following Horst Hrubesch's conversion at the spot to give them a 4–5 win. Six and Bossis missed their penalties for France. France lost the third place match 2–3 to Poland, as Platini, Rocheteau, Giresse, Bossis, and Six were all rested. Six appeared as a late-match substitute.

=== Euro 84 Champions ===
On 29 February 1984, France defeated England 2–0 at the Parc des Princes. The match marked the inauguration of the "carré magique" as it was the first time all four players, Platini, Giresse, Tigana, and Fernández, started a match together. Hidalgo was a keen admirer of the 4–4–2 formation and used all four players perfectly, placing Tigana and Fernández in defensive midfield roles to act as deep-lying playmakers, inserted Giresse on the wings in order to use his small, agile frame, and placing Platini, now of Juventus fame and nationally recognised, into the playmaker position just behind the striker, who was usually Dominique Rocheteau, Bernard Lacombe or Didier Six.

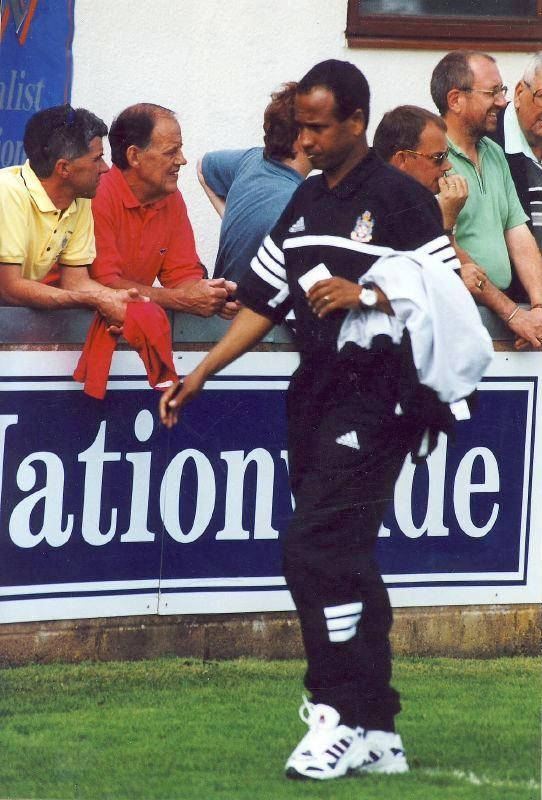
Jean Tigana, member of the Magic Square and French international until 1988.

Since France hosted UEFA Euro 1984, they played numerous friendly matches to prepare themselves for the tournament. The expectations in the country were high heading into the competition with the team entering the Euros having gone unbeaten in eleven of the twelve friendly matches, with their only loss coming in a 1–3 defeat by the Danes in Copenhagen. France avenged this defeat in the opening match of the Euros defeating the Danish 1–0 with France's only goal coming from Michel Platini, the ball deflecting off of the head of Dane defender Søren Busk. In the following group stage match, France recorded a 5–0 victory over Belgium with Platini getting a hat trick. Magic Square members Giresse and Fernández also scored. In the final group stage match, Platini scored another hat trick outscoring the Yugoslavians 3–2. In the semi-final, France faced Portugal at the Stade Vélodrome in Marseille and scored a goal from Jean-François Domergue in the 25th minute. Portugal equalised through Rui Jordão and the match went into extra time at 1–1. In extra time, Portugal began the scoring, again through Jordão, in the 98th minute. In the second half of extra time, France equalised with Domergue scoring again in the 115th minute, his only two international goals. Four minutes later, France got the game-winning goal through Michel Platini, who scored following a run into the box by Tigana. France had qualified for their first ever major international final.

In the final, held at the country's national stadium, France played Spain. The match was deadlocked midway through the second half until Platini scored the opening goal via free kick with the help of Spain goalkeeper Luis Arconada, who committed a blunder in an attempt to save the shot. Despite dropping to 10 men, courtesy of two yellow cards given to Yvon Le Roux, France managed to hold on to the result and eventually sealed the match following a goal from Bruno Bellone in injury time. The 2–0 result gave France their first major international title. France later won gold at the 1984 Summer Olympics football tournament and, a year later, defeated Uruguay 2–0 (Dominique Rocheteau & José Touré scoring) to win the Artemio Franchi Trophy, an early precursor to the FIFA Confederations Cup. In a span of a year, France were holders of three of the four major international trophies. Following the Euro triumph, Hidalgo was replaced by former international Henri Michel.

=== 1986 FIFA World Cup ===
Michel and the team soon focused their efforts in winning the 1986 FIFA World Cup in Mexico, where they were labelled as favourites by bookmakers. Following a 2–0 victory over West Germany on 8 December 1984, France were placed on top of the World Football Elo Ratings, a first in the team's history. Following the victory over West Germany, France were on a 14-match unbeaten streak and extended the streak another match before losing to Bulgaria, away, during World Cup qualification. The team lost to East Germany 0–1 in Leipzig and drew 0–0 with Yugoslavia in Sarajevo. They qualified for the competition defeating Yugoslavia 2–0 in their final group stage match.

At the World Cup, France were limited strategically due to significant injuries to star players Platini and Giresse, who played through injections. The team's group was composed of the Soviet Union, Hungary, and Canada. In France's first match, against Canada, the team struggled, but managed to get a goal through youngster Jean-Pierre Papin in the 79th minute. A 1–1 draw with the Soviet Union in the following match put France through to the next round provided they did not lose to the Hungarians; they won 3–0 with goals from Yannick Stopyra and veterans Jean Tigana, and Dominique Rocheteau. In the knockout rounds, France faced defending champions Italy in Mexico City. France won 2–0 with Platini scoring the first of his two important goals in the tournament. Stopyra also scored with Rocheteau providing both assists. In the following round, the "Brazilians of Europe", as France were sometimes called, faced Brazil. Brazil opened the scoring though Careca in the 17th minute. The goal would later be nullified following Platini's goal in the 40th minute. The match eventually went to a penalty shoot-out after no goals were scored in the remaining match time, despite numerous chances for both teams. In the shoot-out, Sócrates missed Brazil's opening shot. France's ensuing three shots were scored by Stopyra, Manuel Amoros, and Bellone. Following Branco's conversion for Brazil, Platini, who was celebrating his 31st birthday, stepped up and sent his shot over the bar. Brazil's next shooter Júlio César missed his chance. Luis Fernández stepped up for France and converted his shot sending France to the semi-finals for the second straight World Cup.

In the semi-finals, at the Estadio Jalisco in Guadalajara, France without Dominique Rocheteau injured against Brazil, faced West Germany, who had defeated them in 1982 in the same round. France lost to the Germans 0–2 with goals from Andreas Brehme and Rudi Völler. Attackers Stopyra, Bellone, Platini and Giresse were completely ineffective in the match with the latter having to be substituted. France won the third place match against Belgium 4–2. The third place match was the last international match for Maxime Bossis, Patrick Battiston, and Bernard Genghini. Dominique Rocheteau and Alain Giresse also retired from international duty following the World Cup. On 29 April 1987, Platini made his last appearance for France in their final European Championship qualifier at home to Iceland, which ended 2–0, but France failed to qualify for UEFA Euro 1988. A few weeks after the Iceland match, Platini announced his retirement from both club and international football.

== Transition years (1988–1996) ==
On 11 June 1988, the French Football Federation announced the completion and inauguration of the Centre Technique National du Football, which includes the Clairefontaine National Football Institute (INF). The academy's main priorities were to develop the country's young players and also to house the senior national football team ahead of important international matches and tournaments. The CTNF cost over ₣104 million to construct and its opening ceremony was attended by then-President of France, François Mitterrand.

Five months after Clairefontaine's opening, manager Henri Michel was fired following a 1–1 away draw with Cyprus in qualification for the 1990 FIFA World Cup. The firing of Michel propelled the influential Claude Bez, who was president of football club Bordeaux, into the role of superintendent for the French team, a position made especially for him. Bez, who was a keen admirer of Platini, sought the former player's services and hired him on 1 November 1988 as manager of the team. Upon arrival, Platini was given the task of qualifying for the 1990 World Cup, as well as introducing younger players like Eric Cantona, Laurent Blanc, and Didier Deschamps alongside veterans Manuel Amoros, Joël Bats, and Jean Tigana. In Platini's first match in charge, France lost 2–3 to Yugoslavia. France had been up 2–1 with 15 minutes remaining before Yugoslavia scored in the 76th and 82nd minute. In France's next qualification match, the team were beaten by Scotland and, in the following match, drew 0–0 with Yugoslavia. Through four matches, the team had only accumulated two points, preventing them from qualifying for the 1990 World Cup.

=== UEFA Euro 1992 ===
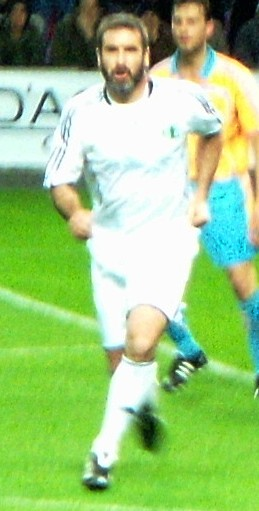
Eric Cantona, key figure in the national team from 1988 to 1995.

The team went undefeated in UEFA Euro 1992 qualifying Group 1 with Cantona and Jean-Pierre Papin scoring 12 of the team's 20 goals. The victories in the group included victories away to Spain and Czechoslovakia. Alongside their perfect qualifying campaign, the team managed to go on a 19 match unbeaten streak that lasted for almost three years. The unbeaten streak began on 29 April 1989 with 0–0 draw and lasted until 19 February 1992 and a 0–2 defeat against England in London. For his efforts, Platini was named Manager of the Year by the World Soccer Awards and the team was quickly named as one of the favourites to win the competition. At the European Championships, France's opponents were Sweden, England, and Denmark. The team drew its first two matches with Sweden (1–1) and England (0–0) before losing to the Danes, who later won the competition. France was eliminated. A week after the completion of the tournament, Platini stepped down as manager and was replaced by his assistant Gérard Houllier.

=== 1994 World Cup qualification ===
Houllier took over on 26 August 1992 when France lost 0–2 in a vital friendly match against Brazil in Paris. The next month, France began their qualification crusade for the 1994 FIFA World Cup and opened the campaign with an 0–2 loss to Bulgaria. France responded by going on a seven-match unbeaten streak in the qualification group, defeating the likes of Sweden, Finland, and Austria with Cantona, Papin, and Blanc leading the way. The victory to Israel all but secured qualification to the tournament. In France's final two matches, they faced last-place Israel and Bulgaria, the only team in the group that could catch them. In the first match against Israel, France were stunned 2–3 in front of their home support by the Israelis who came back from a goal down to score two late goals, including the winning goal in the final minute.

The loss to Israel and a 4–1 victory by Bulgaria over Austria meant France needed only a draw in order to qualify for the World Cup. Bulgaria would have to win the match at the Parc des Princes outright to advance. As expected, the match was tense from the start with many supporters and media later commenting that France seemed not to be playing to win, but rather, not to lose. Eric Cantona opened the scoring in the 31st minute following service from Papin and Deschamps. Minutes later, Cantona's goal was cancelled out by a goal from Emil Kostadinov. Following halftime, Houllier and the team held onto the draw by dropping everyone back to defend. The Bulgarians' initial attacks were tenacious, but France held on well into the second half. In the final minute of play, French Player of the Year David Ginola (who subbed in for Papin at the 69th minute) earned the team an indirect free kick near the corner flag. After a few seconds, midfielder Vincent Guerin slid a short pass to Ginola, who, rather than shield the ball and run the clock down, swung a deep cross into the Bulgarian box, intended for Cantona. The ball was overhit and quickly intercepted by the Bulgarians who began a counterattack. Since many of the French players were expecting Ginola to play out time, they were caught off-guard. The counterattack led to a goal from Kostadinov, his second of the match, and France's elimination from the 1994 World Cup. Houiller later blamed Ginola, declaring that "The adventure is over all too soon. With only 30 seconds remaining we were there but we got stabbed in the back and at the worst possible time. The referee still had his whistle to his mouth when Ginola won that free kick near the corner flag, but then he goes and sends in a huge 60-metre cross instead of hanging on to the ball. That allowed Bulgaria to go and hit us on the counter." Deschamps was later quoted saying, "We've made real asses of ourselves." Following constant ridicule and embarrassment, Ginola departed the country for England. The public outcry following the defeat led to the firing of Houllier. His assistant Aimé Jacquet took over.

In 2011, it emerged that two of the key Bulgarian players, double scorer Kostadinov and Luboslav Penev, who set up the winning goal, did not have valid visas to be in France and had entered the country illegally. Due to an administrative oversight, the Bulgarian Football Union had omitted to apply for visas for the two players, and only realised the issue when it was too late to apply for the necessary visas in time for the match. Fellow Bulgarian internationals Borislav Mihaylov and Georgi Georgiev, who both played for French team FC Mulhouse, close to the German border, knew of a quiet border crossing on a back road with low security; Georgiev brought Kostadinov and Penev across the border in a car and on to the match in Paris. Had France been aware of this issue at the time, they may have had a valid cause to apply for the match to be replayed or even forfeited in their favour, thus enabling them to qualify for the World Cup.

== Zidane era ==
Aimé Jacquet was manager for UEFA Euro 1996 qualifying. On 17 August 1994, in his fourth match in charge of the team, he gave Zinedine Zidane, then of Bordeaux, his debut. Other players who made their debuts in that match included Lilian Thuram and Bruno Ngotty. Zidane appeared as a substitute in the 63rd minute with France trailing the Czech Republic 2–0. After almost 20 minutes on the field, Zidane scored in the 85th minute, then another two minutes later to even the match at 2–2, the final result. With qualifying for Euro 1996 ahead, Jacquet was given a successfully integrated squad composed of the veterans who returned to the team after World Cup failure in captain Eric Cantona, Didier Deschamps, Laurent Blanc, Emmanuel Petit, Marcel Desailly, and Bixente Lizarazu and young and influential players in Zidane, Thuram, and Christophe Dugarry. In January 1995 with the team well into qualifying for EURO 1996, Jacquet lost Cantona due to the Selhurst Park incident. Deschamps replaced him as captain.

=== UEFA Euro 96 ===
For qualification to the upcoming European Championship, France were in the first group alongside Romania, Slovakia, Poland, Azerbaijan, and Israel. France initially struggled, drawing their first three matches against Slovakia, Romania, and Poland 0–0. France beat Azerbaijan 2–0 on 13 December 1994. In the team's following match, France drew with Israel, but recorded a 4–0 result in the return match against Slovakia. On 6 September 1995, France recorded a 10–0 victory over Azerbaijan, the national team's biggest victory until 2023. Despite finishing qualification undefeated with five wins and five draws, France missed out on first place by one point to Romania. Their second-place finish was enough to qualify for UEFA Euro 1996; France were the last second-place team in the runner-up standings and one spot away from being forced to contest a play-off.

Prior to the competition, Jacquet played top teams in Germany, Portugal, and Greece in friendlies. France earned positive results in all three matches, included a 1–0 victory over the Germans at the Gottlieb-Daimler-Stadion in Stuttgart. The team entered the tournament on a 22-match unbeaten streak, which led to claims France were "the best form team of Europe". At the tournament, France were grouped with qualifying partner Romania, Spain, and Bulgaria. In the opening match at St James' Park in Newcastle, France beat Romania 1–0 with Dugarry scoring the winner. Against Spain in Leeds, France drew 1–1 despite being up 1–0 for most of the second half due to a goal from Youri Djorkaeff. Spain equalised through José Luis Caminero in the 86th minute. In the team's final group match against Bulgaria, France needed only a draw to progress to the knockout stage. Laurent Blanc scored an early first half goal from a corner kick from Djorkaeff. After limiting the Bulgarians' attack, France finished them off following an own goal from Luboslav Penev. Bulgaria got a goal back six minutes later, but in injury time Patrice Loko scored the final goal in a 3–1 victory.

In the quarter-finals, France faced the Netherlands at Anfield in Liverpool. The match ended 0–0 in normal time and extra time. In the penalty shootout, every player converted their chance apart from the young Clarence Seedorf, which meant France advanced to the semi-finals to face the Czech Republic. This match also ended in a scoreless draw, which again meant penalties. Jacquet positioned each player in the same spot they were stationed for the shootout with the Dutch. All five players (Zidane, Djorkaeff, Lizarazu, Guérin, and Blanc) converted their chances, but the Czechs were equal to the task converting all five of theirs as well. The next player for France was Reynald Pedros. Pedros had been praised by the French media for his impressive play with Nantes, but stepped up and took a slow shot that was easily saved by the Czech goalkeeper Petr Kouba. The next shot for the Czech was converted by Miroslav Kadlec eliminating France from the competition. Although Cantona had been eligible to return to the team since November 1995, Jacquet preferred to keep the team that had got France to the tournament. The lack of scoring in the team ultimately led to Jacquet considering new options to take up the striker and winger positions in the team.

=== 1998 World Cup and Euro 2000 champions ===
On 1 July 1992, FIFA announced that France would be the host of the 1998 FIFA World Cup. The announcement led to the construction of the Stade de France, the country's national stadium; built in the Parisian suburb of Saint-Denis. France were excused from qualifying and began hosting monthly competitive friendly matches beginning with a 2–0 win over Mexico on 31 August 1996. Jacquet gave debuts to numerous players during the exhibition matches. Winger Robert Pires of Metz fame made his debut in the Mexico match. Arsenal midfielder Patrick Vieira made his debut in the team's 2–1 win over the Dutch on 26 February 1997 and, in the team's following match against Sweden in April, Claude Makélélé was given a place in the team; he had already made his debut in 1995. On 11 November against South Africa, Thierry Henry and Stéphane Guivarc'h made their debuts in the team and David Trezeguet did so on 28 January 1998 against Spain, in an inauguration match for the recently completed Stade de France. In total, France played in 18 friendly matches leading up to the World Cup earning 10 wins, 5 draws, and suffering 3 defeats. The team recorded wins over Portugal, the Netherlands, Sweden, and Spain and also earned a 1–1 draw against Brazil at the Stade de Gerland in 1997. Jacquet's squad for the World Cup was extremely different from the Euro 1996 squad, with only Bernard Lama, Blanc, Zidane, Deschamps, Petit, Desailly, Djorkaeff, Lizarazu, Frank Leboeuf, Christian Karembeu, and backup goalkeeper Fabien Barthez remaining. Most of the spots available were taken up by the young players who made their debuts during the friendly matches such as Vieira, Henry, Pires, Vincent Candela, Alain Boghossian, and Trezeguet. Jacquet adopted a 4–3–3 formation with Henry and Djorkaeff on the wings and Zidane playing in an advance midfield playmaker role. Deschamps and Petit served as protectors and distributors of the ball, while full backs Thuram and Lizarazu got forward as often as they could to support the attack.

The format of the 1998 FIFA World Cup was different from 1994, as the finals were expanded from 24 to 32 teams. The golden goal rule was also introduced to decide knockout matches which went into extra time. Another change in the rules also came into effect at this World Cup, stating that as regulation time was about to expire in any period of play, the fourth official would use a hand-held electronic display to show how many minutes of stoppage time were to be played. France were in a group with South Africa, Denmark, and Saudi Arabia.

France beat South Africa 3–0 at the Stade Vélodrome in Marseille, with Henry scoring his first international goal in the 92nd minute. In the team's following match against Saudi Arabia at the Stade de France, they got a 4–0 win with Henry scoring two. The victory secured a spot in the knockout rounds. In the team's final group stage match in Lyon against Denmark, France won 2–1 with Djorkaeff scoring a penalty and Petit netting the game-winning goal. In the Round of 16, France faced Paraguay in Lens. The team were without Zidane due to a red card suspension and also Dugarry, who was injured. The match ended scoreless in normal time. In extra time, Laurent Blanc scored the first golden goal in World Cup history in the 114th minute. The golden goal put France into the quarter-finals where they faced rivals Italy at the Stade de France in front of 77,000 supporters. Despite Zidane returning to the team, France were met head on with an equally matched team composed of the likes of Paolo Maldini, Alessandro Costacurta, Fabio Cannavaro, Giuseppe Bergomi, and Roberto Baggio. The match ended in a draw in both normal and extra time, so it went to penalties, where France defeated Italy 4–3 to advance to the World Cup semi-finals for the fourth time with Lizarazu missing for France and Demetrio Albertini and Luigi Di Biagio for Italy.

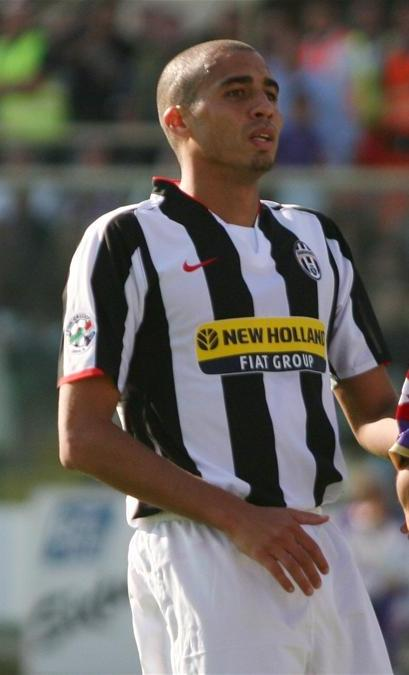
David Trezeguet scored the golden goal in the UEFA Euro 2000 Final.

France faced Croatia in the semi-finals, with both teams knowing they played Brazil if they won. Croatia opened the scoring a minute into the second half through Davor Šuker. Only a minute later, France equalised through Lilian Thuram who took a pass from Djorkaeff coming in from the right and blasted an 11-metre shot past Dražen Ladić. In the 69th minute, Thuram scored a second goal to put France up 2–1. After receiving a relay pass from Henry, Thuram stepped up and took a piercing 18-metre shot from the right to give France the lead. The two goals scored by Thuram are the only goals he scored for the national team. 2–1 was the final score putting France into the final. The Croatia match ended in controversy when Laurent Blanc was sent off after a skirmish with Croatia's Slaven Bilić. Bilić had sunk down to his knees, seemingly in pain. Replays showed that there was minimal contact between the players. Blanc's expulsion meant he would miss the final.

In the final, Jacquet put four players in the midfield. He inserted Karembeu to assist Petit and Deschamps in distributing the ball and to help effectively man-mark both Leonardo and Rivaldo. Jacquet also moved Zidane wide left. Djorkaeff played just behind the lead striker Guivarc'h for the sole purpose of eliminating the deep-lying playmaking skills of Brazilian captain Dunga. Zidane gave France the lead just before the half-hour with a header from an in-swinging corner and service from Petit. Minutes later, the prolific Brazilian striker Ronaldo was put through on goal by a long ball from Dunga, but he could not get the better of Barthez, who collided with him. Both needed assistance from medics but quickly recovered. In injury time for the first half, Zidane doubled the team's advantage with an almost identical goal, this time with Djorkaeff providing the assist. In the second half, Ronaldo had a chance to half the deficit. The ball fell kindly for him inside the penalty box, but he could only plant his shot into Barthez's arms. In the 68th minute, France were reduced to 10 men following a second yellow card to Desailly, but the Brazilian attack failed to respond. Petit wrapped up the scoring in the 90th minute to put the victory beyond all doubt. The victory led to jubilation all over the country. Zidane was named the FIFA World Player of the Year six months after the tournament. Jacquet was praised by the media and former managers and players for his passion, humility, inspiration, and respect in helping the team win the tournament. Michel Hildago, who won the country's first major title, declared, "This is Aime Jacquet's crowning moment, achieved against winds and tides. There are 60 million happy French people. What they did was just extraordinary." The evening of the victory, Jacquet stepped down from his position.

=== 2000–2006 ===
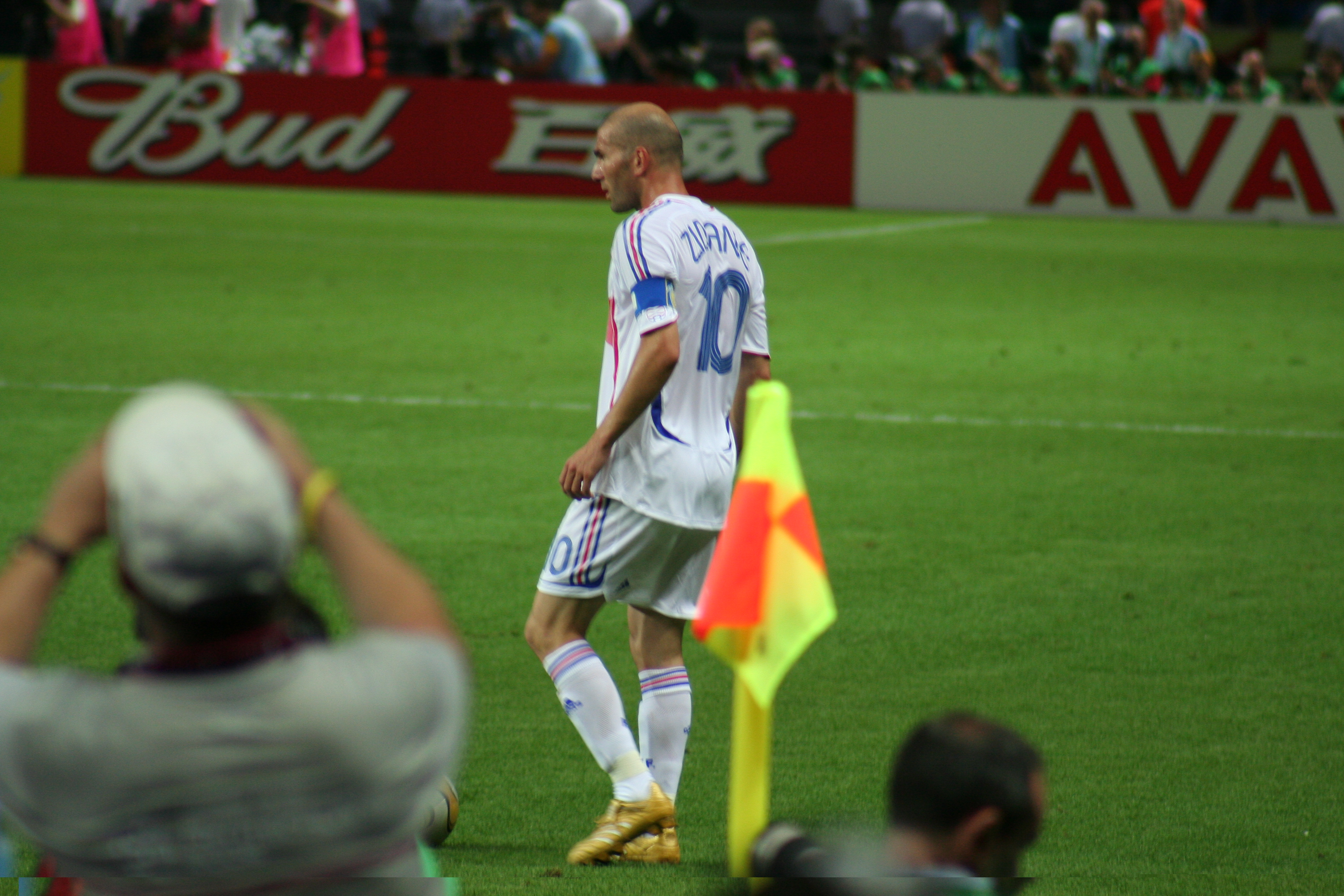
Zinedine Zidane at the 2006 FIFA World Cup.

At Euro 2000 France won the tournament becoming the second team in history to win both the World Cup and European Championship after Germany in 1972 and 1974. At the final France led by Roger Lemerre faced another golden generation team Italy who previously met at the 1998 World Cup quarter-finals. France struggled a lot during the final with a goal from Italian striker Marco Delvecchio in the 55th minute. However a dying pressure France got the last minute goal from newcomer Sylvain Wiltord, followed by a golden goal from David Trezeguet which France ended up winning the entire tournament defeating the Italians 2-1 in extra time. After their European Championship triumph victory, France would win the Confederations Cup in 2001, then suffered first round elimination at the 2002 FIFA World Cup. One of the greatest shocks in World Cup history saw France fall to a 1–0 defeat by debutantes Senegal in the opening game of the tournament, followed by a draw 0-0 against Uruguay and then suffered 2-0 against Denmark (who they got revenge against the French after there two previous tournament matches in 1998 and 2000 in which France won). After France finished bottom of the group without scoring, Lemerre was dismissed and was replaced by Jacques Santini. France became the second nation to be eliminated in the first round while holding the World Cup crown, the first one being Brazil in 1966. After the 2010, 2014 and 2018 World Cup, Italy, Spain and Germany were also added to this list. A full strength team started out strongly in UEFA Euro 2004, and were beaten in the quarter-finals by the eventual winners Greece. Santini resigned as coach and Raymond Domenech was picked as his replacement.

France struggled in the early qualifiers for the 2006 FIFA World Cup. This prompted Domenech to persuade several past members out of international retirement to help the national team qualify, which they accomplished following a 4–0 win over Cyprus on the final day of qualifying. In the 2006 FIFA World Cup, France finished undefeated in the group stage portion and advanced all the way to the final defeating the likes of Spain, Brazil, and Portugal along the way. France took on Italy in the final. Zidane scored an early penalty, while Marco Materazzi equalized 12 minutes later. Zidane was shown a red card and was sent off in his last ever national match after headbutting Materazzi. Italy won 5–3 on penalties to win the 2006 FIFA World Cup.

== Decline (2008–2012) ==
=== UEFA Euro 2008 collapse ===
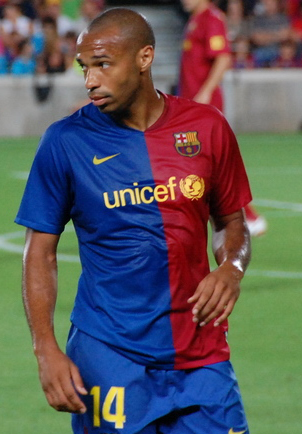
Thierry Henry, key figure in the national team during the Domenech era.

France started its qualifying round for UEFA Euro 2008 on 2 September 2006 by beating Georgia in Tbilisi 3–0 with goals from Malouda, Louis Saha and Malkhaz Asatiani (own goal). They then took on world champions Italy 3–1 in Paris on 6 September 2006 with Sidney Govou striking twice along with Henry, but were beaten 1–0 by Scotland on 7 October 2006, their first European Championship qualifying defeat since they lost 3–2 to Russia on 5 June 1999. On 11 October 2006, France defeated the Faroe Islands 5–0. All the French strikers who played in the match scored; Louis Saha, Thierry Henry, Nicolas Anelka, and two from Juventus striker David Trezeguet. France beat Lithuania 1–0 on 24 March 2007 with Chelsea striker Nicolas Anelka rescuing an injury hit French side by shooting a long range effort. Louis Saha, Thierry Henry, Franck Ribéry, Patrick Vieira, and David Trézéguet were injured. France took on Ukraine on 2 June 2007 in Paris. Both teams were hit by injuries, with France missing Patrick Vieira and Thierry Henry while Ukraine missed their striker Andriy Shevchenko. The game ended in a 2–0 victory for France, with second-half strikes from Franck Ribéry and Nicolas Anelka, his third goal in three matches. Then, on 6 June 2007, France defeated Georgia in Auxerre 1–0, with Samir Nasri scoring his first senior international goal. On 8 September 2007 France and Italy played a 0–0 draw at the San Siro in Milan. Once again though, on 12 September 2007, France lost to Scotland and were defeated 1–0 after Mickaël Landreau was caught off guard with a strike from Scotland's James McFadden, at the Parc des Princes in Paris. On 12 October 2007, their match with the Faroe Islands was threatened with postponement after bad weather kept their plane from landing in the Faroe Islands; they had to spend the night in Norway. The next day the match went ahead, albeit around 30 minutes after scheduled kick-off time with France taking just 8 minutes to open up a 2–0 lead; the match finished 6–0 with strikes from Nicolas Anelka, Thierry Henry, and two goals from Karim Benzema just before half time. In the second half, Jérôme Rothen and Hatem Ben Arfa completed the rout. With Italy's victory over Scotland on 17 November 2007, France qualified for Euro 2008 by two points over Scotland.

The squad made a poor start to the 2008 European Championships, drawing 0–0 to Romania in Zürich and then losing 4–1 to Netherlands in Bern. For the final group game against Italy, Raymond Domenech dropped Lilian Thuram and replaced him with Eric Abidal. Abidal looked out of his depth in the centre of defence and subsequently was sent off for a rash challenge on Luca Toni. France continued to play poorly and when they lost 2–0 to Italy, they came last of their group and were eliminated from the tournament.

Only three players from the successful teams of 1998-2000 were selected in the final squad for Euro 2008 by French coach Raymond Domenech, with only Thierry Henry and Lilian Thuram earning game time, and their effectiveness and performances were soundly criticised by French football media. The third player, Patrick Vieira, was initially named the team captain but was unable to take the field in any of France's Euro matches due to a thigh injury. The team's exit from the tournament signalled the international retirements of Lilian Thuram, Claude Makélélé, and Willy Sagnol, with the last announcing his club and international retirement synonymously. After the tournament, calls were made for the sacking of Raymond Domenech, and Didier Deschamps, captain of the 1998 World Cup and 2000 Euro championship teams, was sounded out as a suitable replacement but on 3 July, at a French Football Federation high level meeting in Paris, it was announced that Domenech would be retained as manager.

=== 2010 World Cup qualifying ===
France's campaign for 2010 World Cup qualification got off to a disappointing start with a 3–1 defeat by Austria in Vienna on 6 September 2008. Speculation followed regarding the future of Raymond Domenech as team coach prior to the subsequent match, against Serbia, four days later. There, with goals from Thierry Henry and Nicolas Anelka, France won 2–1 at home. On 11 October, France drew 2–2 with Romania, after coming back from a 2–0 deficit. In 2009, France resumed their qualification with a back to back 1–0 win over Lithuania, thanks to Franck Ribéry, as he scored the only goal in both games on 28 March and 1 April.

A narrow 1–0 victory over the Faroe Islands in Tórshavn on 12 August 2009 was achieved thanks to a first-half goal by André-Pierre Gignac. A disappointing 1–1 home draw with Romania followed by another 1–1 draw away to Serbia put France on the brink of missing out on the automatic qualification spot as group winners. Thierry Henry scored in both 1–1 draw matches and put his tally to 50 international goals. France finished second in the group, behind Serbia, and earned a spot in the UEFA play-offs against the Republic of Ireland for a place for the 2010 FIFA World Cup.

==== Hand of Henry ====
Due to France's second-place finish, they went into the UEFA qualification playoffs. In the draw, FIFA controversially decided to use the seeding system to categorise the teams, something they claimed they would not be using. France went into Pot 1 and, on 19 October, they were drawn against the Republic of Ireland with the first leg to be played on 14 November in Dublin at Croke Park and the second leg on 18 November at the Stade de France in Paris.

On 14 November 2009, France met the Republic of Ireland in the first leg of the play-off. Nicolas Anelka scored in the 72nd minute when his shot deflected off Sean St Ledger. The first leg finished 1–0 for France.

In the second leg, Robbie Keane scored for Ireland and William Gallas for France; following a free kick from Florent Malouda into the box, Thierry Henry handled the ball twice before crossing to Gallas for the winning goal in extra time. Henry afterwards admitted handling the ball. "I have never denied that the ball was controlled with my hand", Henry said. "Naturally, I feel embarrassed at the way that we won and feel extremely sorry for the Irish who definitely deserve to be in South Africa". Despite appeals for a replay, the French Football Federation, and then later FIFA, rejected the request. The Football Association of Ireland said that the incident, which dominated news bulletins in Ireland all day as well as being discussed in parliament, had "damaged the integrity of the sport." The controversial incident dominated sports coverage for a week, and led to calls for the introduction of video technology, and also more assistant referees, to prevent such incidents in the future.

=== 2010 FIFA World Cup ===
On 4 December 2009, the draw for the 2010 FIFA World Cup was held and France were unseeded and put into the fourth pot of the draw. FIFA attributed the placement to the new criteria announced two days before the draw. Former national team manager Michel Hidalgo declared that the move was punishment for the handball incident involving Henry. The lack of seeding did not have a detrimental effect on France, as they were drawn into Group A alongside the hosts South Africa, Mexico, and Uruguay. Prior to the tournament, France played friendly matches against Costa Rica, Tunisia, and China. Against the last, France were shockingly defeated 1–0

In the competition, France started against Uruguay and drew 0–0. Just Fontaine was frustrated with the performance of Nicolas Anelka and Franck Ribéry. Fontaine also stated that Gourcuff seemed "lost" during the match. The media later reported that Anelka and Ribéry purposely froze Gourcuff out of the match by not passing the ball to him. In the team's next match against Mexico, France were defeated 2–0. The next day, Anelka was dismissed from the national team after a dispute with team manager Raymond Domenech during half-time of the team's loss to Mexico. The federation condemned Anelka's actions and, following a meeting with the player, Domenech, and team captain Patrice Evra, agreed to send Anelka home. The following day, Evra got into a heated confrontation with team trainer Robert Duverne with the latter having to be restrained by Domenech. The resulting confrontation led to the players returning to the team bus and cancelling training. The team's managing director, Jean-Louis Valentin, announced his resignation from his position and the federation the same day stating he was "sickened and disgusted" by the actions of the team. The team, through Domenech, later released a statement criticising the federation for sending Anelka home based on reports from the media. The federation responded to the statement by declaring the players' boycott "unacceptable" and apologising to the world for the conduct of the players. The federation also announced that following the World Cup, the Federal Council would convene to discuss the current state of the team. On 21 June 2010, the national team returned to training without incident. The following day, France were defeated 2–1 by the hosts South Africa. The result eliminated them from the competition. The day after the team's elimination, it was reported by numerous media outlets that the President of France Nicolas Sarkozy would meet with team captain Thierry Henry to discuss the issues associated with the team at the World Cup. The meeting was requested by Henry. On 28 June 2010 FFF president Jean-Pierre Escalettes announced his resignation from his position effective 2 July.

Five players were identified as having been key to the events at the World Cup, Nicolas Anelka, Patrice Evra, Franck Ribéry, Jérémy Toulalan and Eric Abidal, and were summoned to a hearing before the FFF disciplinary committee on 17 August 2010. After the expulsion of Anelka and ensuing training strike, Evra and Ribery were summoned for failing in their duties as captain and vice captain, Toulalan was seen as the originator of the statement read out by coach Domenech to the media, while Abidal was accused of refusing to play in the final group match. After the hearing, Anelka was banned from playing for France for 18 games, Evra was banned for five, Ribery for three, and Toulalan for one, while Abidal escaped punishment. Anelka dismissed the sanction as irrelevant, considering himself already retired from international football.

On 16 May 2010, Laurent Blanc confirmed his departure from Bordeaux after three seasons in charge. After resigning, Blanc contacted the French Football Federation to enquire about the national team job, which was set to be vacated by Raymond Domenech following the World Cup. Later that day, president Escalettes confirmed that Blanc was a candidate for the position. On 18 May 2010, with Blanc's appointment to the position becoming more probable, Bordeaux chairman Jean-Louis Triaud demanded compensation from the federation. On 20 May 2010, the club reached an agreement with the federation for €1.5 million. On 26 June 2010, French media confirmed that Blanc had signed a two-year contract with the federation and will lead the team to UEFA Euro 2012. The deal was finalised a week later and Blanc was officially named as manager of the team on 2 July. On 6 July, Blanc was presented to the media for the first time as coach and declared: "The France team does not belong to anybody. It is for everyone, for you (the media) the same as for me. I understand what the France team represents, the rights and the requirements linked to this jersey." Blanc also stated that the players involved in the World Cup debacle will be given a clean slate, but he, himself, will speak with the players about what happened and will make his call up decisions based on sporting considerations. On 23 July 2010, following a meeting by the Federal Council of the French Football Federation, all 23 players in the World Cup squad were suspended for the team's 11 August friendly match against Norway on request of new coach Blanc.

=== Euro 2012 ===
France were drawn in Group D of Euro 2012 qualifying along with Romania, Bosnia and Herzegovina, Belarus, Albania, and Luxembourg. France got off to a disastrous start in their first qualifier where they surprisingly lost 0–1 to Belarus at home. However, this loss was followed by three successive wins against Romania, Bosnia and Herzegovina and Luxembourg. France eventually topped their group, thus automatically qualifying for Euro 2012. In the finals in Poland and Ukraine, France were in Group D along with rivals England, Sweden and Ukraine. France began Euro 2012 with a 1–1 draw against England which was followed by a 2–0 win over co-hosts Ukraine. Although France lost their final group game 0–2 to Sweden, they ended second in their group and qualified for the quarter-finals, where they were beaten by eventual champions Spain. Following the tournament, coach Laurent Blanc resigned and was succeeded by Didier Deschamps, who captained France to glory in the 1998 World Cup and Euro 2000.

France were drawn in Group I of the UEFA zone qualification for the 2014 World Cup. They were drawn alongside defending champions Spain, Finland, Belarus and Georgia. France began well, winning their first two qualifiers against Finland and Belarus. In their next qualifier, against Spain in Madrid, France were heading towards a 1–0 defeat until Olivier Giroud equalised in injury time. France, however, lost their return leg against Spain, falling 0–1 at home. France ended second in Group I and would play against Ukraine in the playoffs. In the first leg in Kyiv, France lost 2–0, forcing them to win the second leg by at least three goals in order to qualify. In the second leg at home, France won 3–0 thanks to a brace by Mamadou Sakho and a goal from Karim Benzema.

=== 2014 World Cup ===
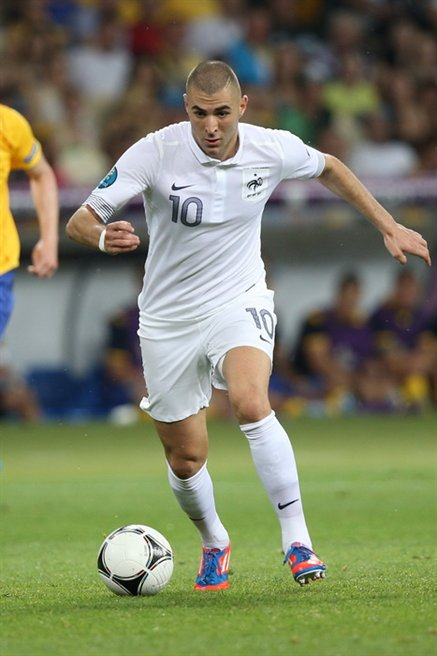
Karim Benzema was France's top scorer in the 2014 World Cup with three goals

On leading France to the 2014 World Cup, Didier Deschamps extended his contract until Euro 2016. France were drawn in Group E of the 2014 World Cup along with Switzerland, Ecuador and Honduras. Although expectations were not very high for France, they were expected to make at least the round of 16. France suffered a huge setback just before the World Cup as star midfielder Franck Ribéry would miss the tournament through injury. France started the World Cup with a 3–0 win against Honduras in which talismanic striker Karim Benzema bagged a brace. This was followed with a 5–2 thrashing of Switzerland and a goalless draw against Ecuador, which was enough for France to win the group and qualify for the knockout stages. France's round of 16 opponents were Nigeria. France won 2–0 and would set up a quarter-final clash against Germany. France were beaten by Germany in the quarter-finals courtesy of an early goal by Mats Hummels. Paul Pogba was awarded the Best Young Player award during the tournament.

== Revival ==
=== Euro 2016 ===
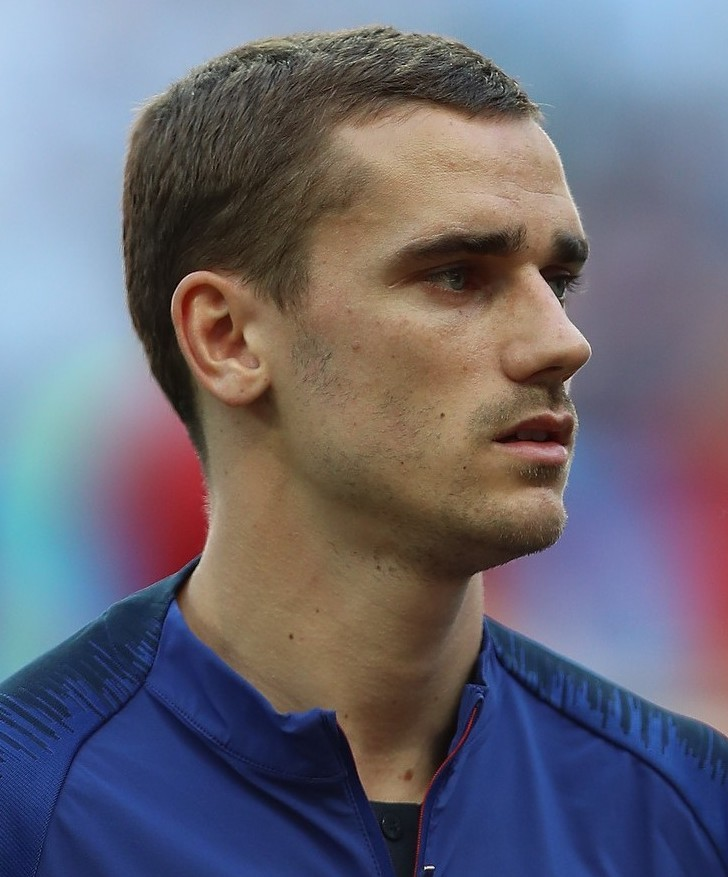
Antoine Griezmann was the top scorer of the Euro 2016 with six goals

France automatically qualified as hosts for Euro 2016. Karim Benzema and Hatem Ben Arfa were not in the squad. France were drawn in Group A of the tournament alongside Romania, Switzerland and Albania. France won their group with wins over Romania and Albania and a goalless draw against Switzerland and were poised to play the Republic of Ireland in the round of sixteen. Ireland took the lead after just two minutes through a controversially awarded penalty, which was converted by Robbie Brady. A brace from Antoine Griezmann, however, helped France to win the match 2–1 and qualify for the quarter-finals, where they beat a resilient Iceland 5–2 to set up a semi-final clash against world champions and tournament co-favourites Germany. France won the match 2–0, marking their first win over Germany at a major tournament since 1958. France, however, were beaten by Portugal 1–0 in the final courtesy of an extra-time goal by Eder. Griezmann was named the Player of the Tournament and was also awarded the Golden Boot in addition to being named in the Team of the Tournament, alongside Dimitri Payet. The defeat meant that France became the second nation to have lost the final on home soil, after Portugal lost the final to Greece in 2004.

=== 2018 FIFA World Cup ===
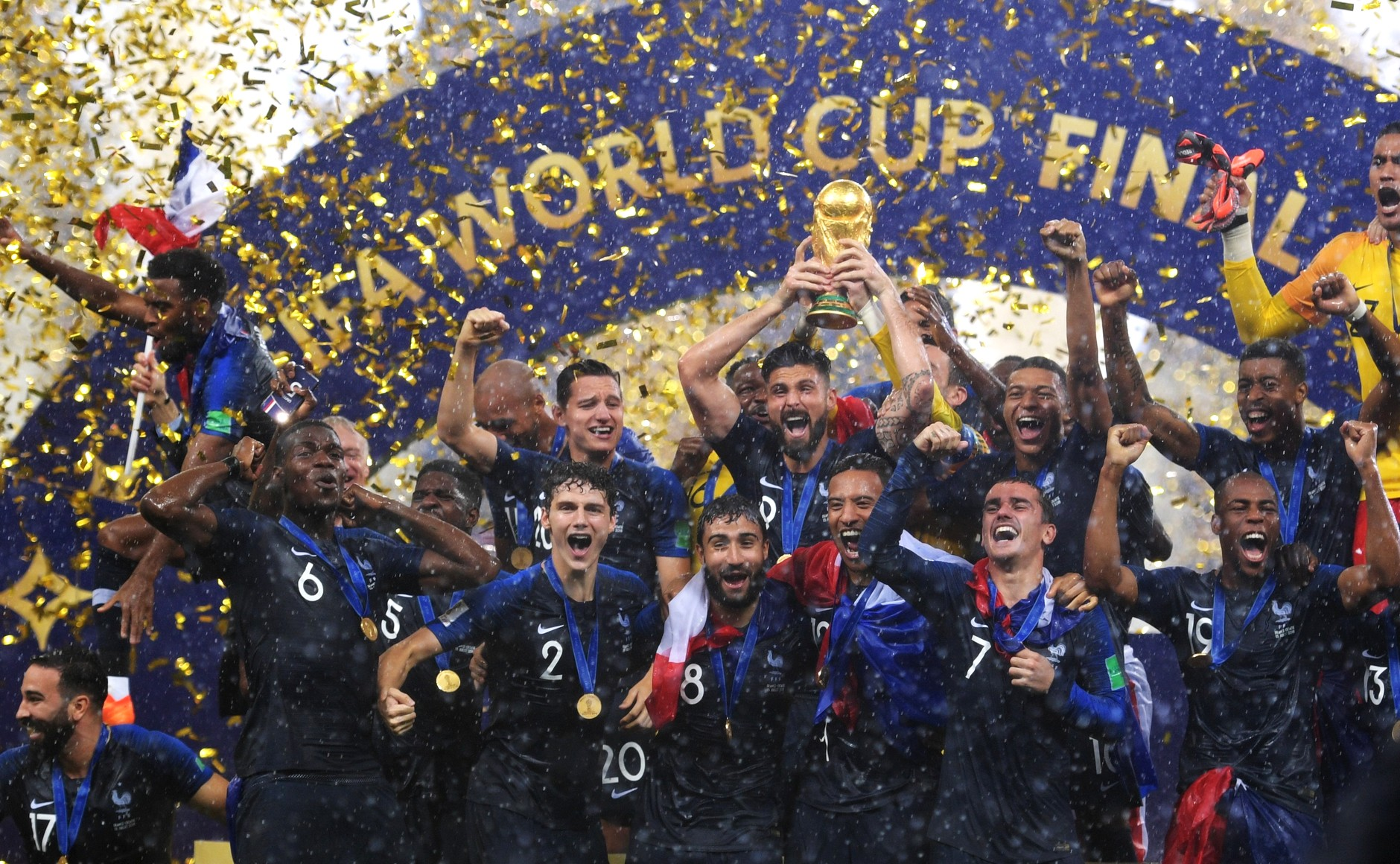
France champion of the Football World Cup Russia 2018

Didier Deschamps lead France to their third World Cup Final in 2018. France finished top of its group ahead of Denmark, Peru and Australia. In the round of sixteen, France faced Argentina in which they beat them 4–3, thanks to great performance by the talented teenager Kylian Mbappé who scored twice for his team. In the quarter-finals, France beat Uruguay 2–0. Belgium managed to beat Brazil 2–1 to face France in the semi-finals, the match ended with a 1–0 win for France through a Samuel Umtiti header from a corner in the second half. After beating Croatia in final, France won their second World Cup title on 15 July 2018, in Luzhniki stadium in Russia. Kylian Mbappé won the "Best young player" award, scoring four goals along with Antoine Griezmann who was awarded the Bronze Ball and the Silver Boot as well. In June 2019, the President of the French Football Federation, Noël Le Graët, and French coach Didier Deschamps received the title "Officier of the Légion d'honneur"; meanwhile, the 23 players in the 2018 World Cup, all received the title "Chevalier of the Légion d'honneur".

Group C

Pos	Team	Pld	W	D	L	GF	GA	GD	Pts	Qualification
1	France	3	2	1	0	3	1	+2	7	Advance to knockout stage
2	Denmark	3	1	2	0	2	1	+1	5	Advance to knockout stage
3	Peru	3	1	0	2	2	2	0	3	
4	Australia	3	0	1	2	2	5	−3	1	

Source: FIFA
Rules for classification: Group stage tiebreakers

30 June 2018
17:00 MSK (UTC+3)

France	4–3	Argentina
Griezmann 13' (pen.); Pavard 57'; Mbappé 64', 68'		Di María 41'; Mercado 48'; Agüero 90+3'

Kazan Arena, Kazan
Attendance: 42,873
Referee: Alireza Faghani (Iran)

6 July 2018
17:00 MSK (UTC+3)

Uruguay	0–2	France
		Varane 40'; Griezmann 61'

Nizhny Novgorod Stadium, Nizhny Novgorod
Attendance: 43,319
Referee: Néstor Pitana (Argentina)

10 July 2018
21:00 MSK (UTC+3)

France	1–0	Belgium
Umtiti 51'

Krestovsky Stadium, Saint Petersburg
Attendance: 64,286
Referee: Andrés Cunha (Uruguay)

15 July 2018
18:00 MSK (UTC+3)

France	4–2	Croatia
Mandžukić 18' (o.g.); Griezmann 38' (pen.); Pogba 59'; Mbappé 65'		Perišić 28'; Mandžukić 69'

Luzhniki Stadium, Moscow
Attendance: 78,011
Referee: Néstor Pitana (Argentina)

=== Euro 2020 ===
The postponed Euro 2020 which was held in summer 2021, witnessed the return of Karim Benzema to the national team after a five-year hiatus. France finished top of their group ahead of Germany, Portugal and Hungary, yet they were eliminated in the round of 16 by Switzerland on penalties after a 3–3 draw.

=== 2022 FIFA World Cup ===
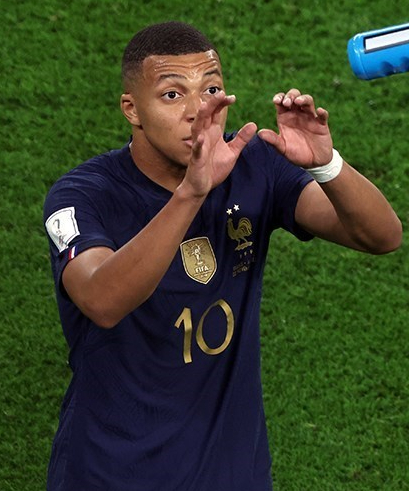
Kylian Mbappé won the 2022 World Cup Golden Boot with eight goals

Several players became injured prior and during the tournament including: Karim Benzema, Lucas Hernandez, N'Golo Kanté, Presnel Kimpembe, Mike Maignan, Christopher Nkunku and Paul Pogba. However, France defeated Poland, England and Morocco in the knockout stages, en route to facing Argentina in their second consecutive final. Kylian Mbappé scored all three goals for France, including the third one that sent the match to a penalty shoot-out. Mbappé scored his first penalty for the team, but Kingsley Coman and Aurélien Tchouaméni both missed their penalties, and France ultimately lost. Mbappé won the Golden Boot by scoring 8 goals in 7 games.

=== UEFA Euro 2024 ===
France qualified for the UEFA Euro 2024 in Germany, where they placed second in the group stage following a victory over Austria 1–0 and two draws against Netherlands (0–0) and Poland (1–1), therefore advancing to the knockout stage. They defeated Belgium 1–0 in the round of 16 and later advanced to the semifinals after defeating Portugal in penalties following a 0–0 score. At this point, France had yet to score a goal from open play, havins scored previous goals from penalty kicks (Poland) or own goals (Belgium and Austria). France was later defeated by Spain 2–1 in the semifinals.

== Previous squads ==
FIFA World Cup squads

- 2026 FIFA World Cup squad
- 2022 FIFA World Cup squad
- 2018 FIFA World Cup squad
- 2014 FIFA World Cup squad
- 2010 FIFA World Cup squad
- 2006 FIFA World Cup squad
- 2002 FIFA World Cup squad
- 1998 FIFA World Cup squad
- 1986 FIFA World Cup squad
- 1982 FIFA World Cup squad
- 1978 FIFA World Cup squad
- 1966 FIFA World Cup squad
- 1958 FIFA World Cup squad
- 1954 FIFA World Cup squad
- 1938 FIFA World Cup squad
- 1934 FIFA World Cup squad
- 1930 FIFA World Cup squad

UEFA European Championship squads

- UEFA Euro 2024 squad
- UEFA Euro 2020 squad
- UEFA Euro 2016 squad
- UEFA Euro 2012 squad
- UEFA Euro 2008 squad
- UEFA Euro 2004 squad
- UEFA Euro 2000 squad
- UEFA Euro 1996 squad
- UEFA Euro 1992 squad
- UEFA Euro 1984 squad
- 1960 European Nations' Cup squad

FIFA Confederations Cup squads

- 2003 FIFA Confederations Cup squad
- 2001 FIFA Confederations Cup squad

UEFA Nations League Finals squads

- 2025 UEFA Nations League Finals squad
- 2021 UEFA Nations League Finals squad
