= Ozoir =

Ozoir may refer to two communes in France:

- Ozoir-la-Ferrière, in the Seine-et-Marne department
- Ozoir-le-Breuil, in the Eure-et-Loir department
