= Georges Bilot =

French footballer (1885–1964)

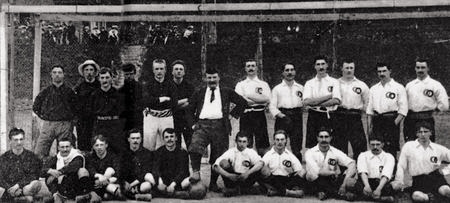
- Bilot in 1904 with France (white shirts): back row, last from left

Personal information
- Date of birth: 12 May 1885
- Place of birth: 11th arrondissement of Paris, France
- Date of death: 9 February 1964 (aged 78)
- Place of death: Lutz-en-Dunois, France
- Positions: Midfielder; defender

Senior career*
| Years | Team | Apps | (Gls) |
| 1903–1905 | FC Paris | | |

International career
| 1904 | France | 1 | (0) |
- * Club domestic league appearances and goals

Georges Bilot (French pronunciation: [ʒɔʁʒ(ə) bilo]; 12 May 1885 – 9 February 1964) was a French footballer who played as a midfielder and defender. He played in the first match of the history of the France national team, a 3–3 draw against Belgium on 1 May 1904 alongside his brother Charles. At club level, he played for FC Paris.

Bilot was mobilised during World War I; he fought in Belgium and on the Marne. He was awarded the Croix de Guerre 1914–1918 for bravery and was injured in 1918.
