= Verdyck =

Verdyck is a surname. Notable people with the surname include:

- Alfred Verdyck (1882–1964), Belgian footballer
- Auguste Verdyck (1902–1988), Belgian road bicycle racer
