= Charles Bilot =

French footballer (1883–1912)

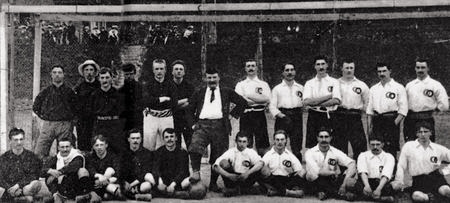
- Bilot in 1904 with France (white shirts): back row, second-last from left

Personal information
- Date of birth: 10 March 1883
- Place of birth: 11th arrondissement of Paris
- Date of death: 17 September 1912 (aged 29)
- Place of death: 11th arrondissement of Paris

Senior career*
Years	Team	Apps	(Gls)
1903–1905	FC Paris		
1905–1912	Club athlétique de Paris		

International career
1904–1912	France	6	(0)
- * Club domestic league appearances and goals

Charles Bilot (French pronunciation: [ʃaʁl(ə) bilo]; 10 March 1883 – 17 September 1912) was a French footballer. He played in the first match of the history of the France national team, a 3–3 draw against Belgium on 1 May 1904 alongside his brother Georges. He also competed in the men's tournament at the 1908 Summer Olympics.

A physician by occupation, he died of tuberculosis aged 29 after contracting the illness while attending a patient. He was interred at Père Lachaise Cemetery.
