= Villemaury =

- Commune
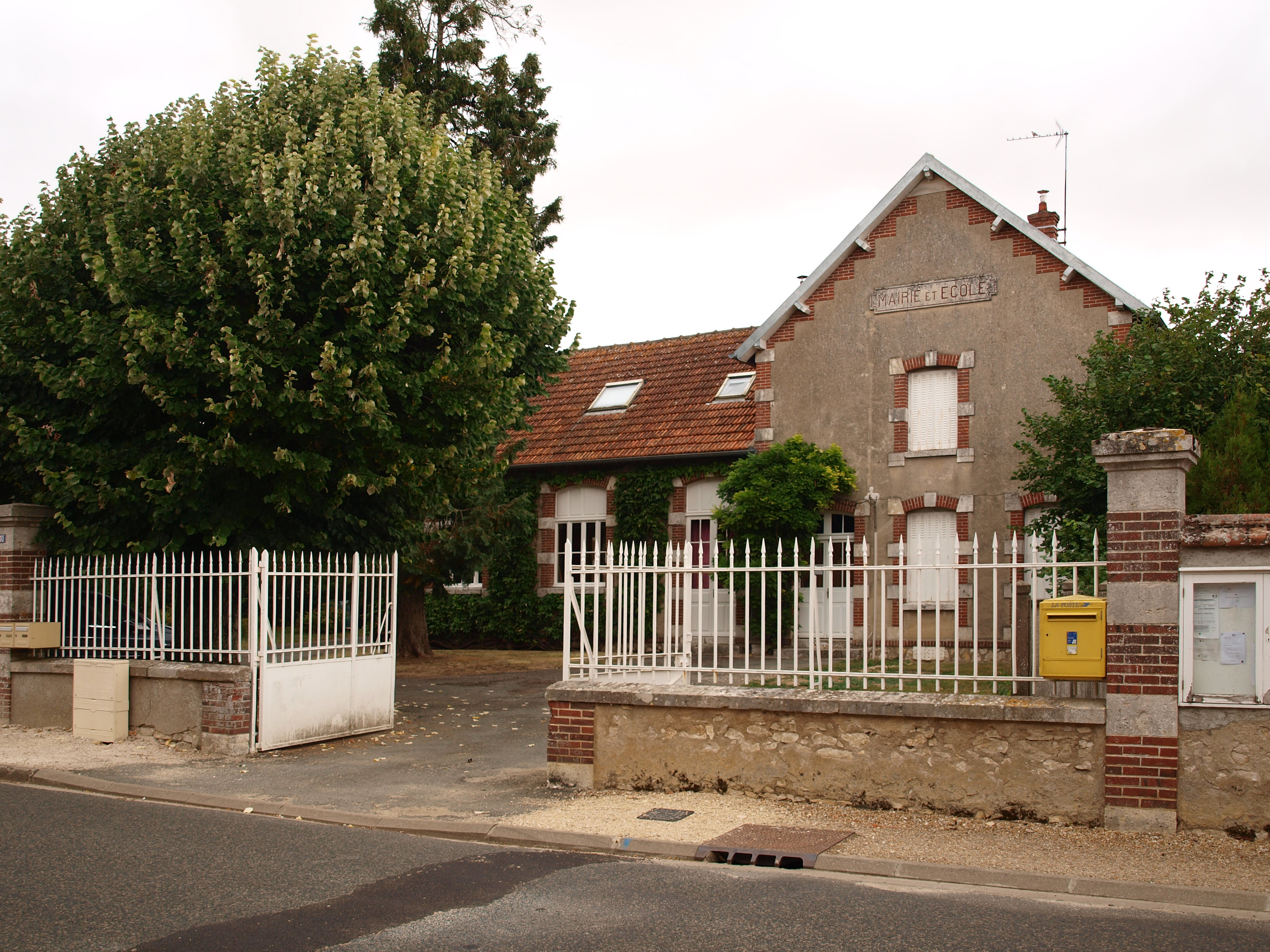
- The town hall in Villemaury

- Coat of arms
- Location of Villemaury
- Location within France Location within Centre-Val de Loire
- Coordinates: 48°02′28″N 1°28′16″E
- Country: France
- Region: Centre-Val de Loire
- Department: Eure-et-Loir
- Arrondissement: Châteaudun
- Canton: Châteaudun
- Intercommunality: Grand Châteaudun

Government
  - Mayor (2020–2026): Jérôme Leclerc
- Area^{1}: 76.15 km^{2} (29.40 sq mi)
- Population (2023): 1,283
  - Density: 16.85/km^{2} (43.64/sq mi)
- Time zone: UTC+01:00 (CET)
  - Summer (DST): UTC+02:00 (CEST)
- INSEE/Postal code: 28330 /28200
- ^{1} French Land Register data, which excludes lakes, ponds, glaciers > 1 km^{2} (0.386 sq mi or 247 acres) and river estuaries.

Villemaury (French pronunciation: [vilmoʁi]) is a commune in the department of Eure-et-Loir, north-central France. The municipality was established on 1 January 2017 by merger of the former communes of Saint-Cloud-en-Dunois (the seat), Civry, Lutz-en-Dunois and Ozoir-le-Breuil.

== See also ==
- Communes of the Eure-et-Loir department
