= Georges Quéritet =

Belgian footballer

Personal information
- Full name: Georges Quéritet
- Date of birth: 6 April 1882
- Date of death: 5 January 1963 (aged 80)
- Position: Forward

Senior career*
| Years | Team | Apps | (Gls) |
| 1902–1903 | RFC Liège | – | (–) |
| 1903–1905 | RC Bruxelles | – | (–) |

International career
| 1904 | Belgium | 1 | (2) |
- * Club domestic league appearances and goals

Georges Quéritet was a Belgian international football player. Having been striker in Royal Football Club de Liège and later in Racing Club de Bruxelles, he also played the first official match of the Belgium national team against France on 1 May 1904. The encounter resulted in a 3–3 draw and Quéritet scored twice, from which the first official goal of the Red Devils in the 7th minute.

In spite of his two goals in that match, his first international appearance would also be his last selection for Belgium.
