= Civry =

- Part of Villemaury
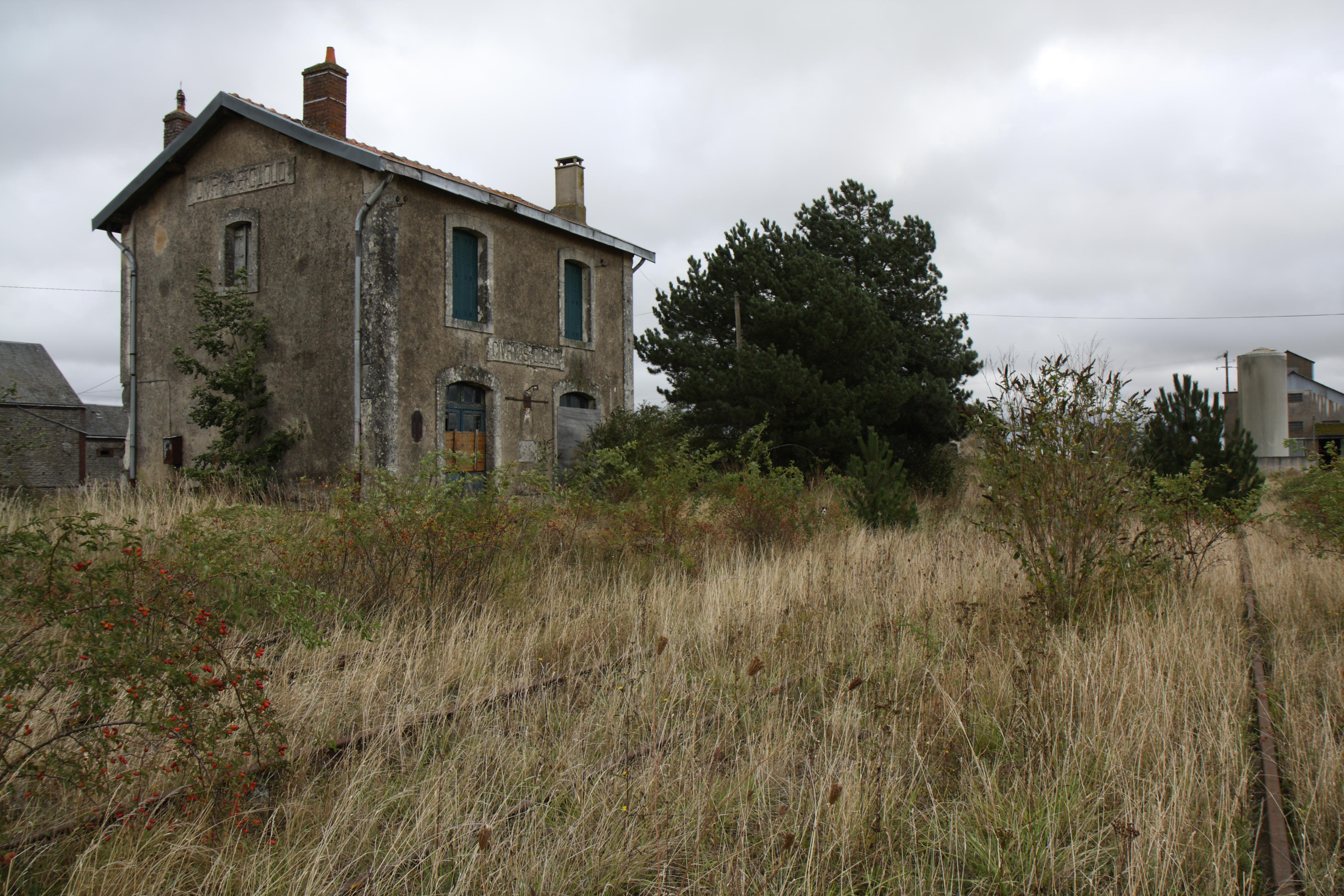
- Former train station
- Location of Civry
- Location within France Location within Centre-Val de Loire
- Coordinates: 48°05′29″N 1°29′31″E
- Country: France
- Region: Centre-Val de Loire
- Department: Eure-et-Loir
- Arrondissement: Châteaudun
- Canton: Châteaudun
- Commune: Villemaury
- Area^{1}: 17.89 km^{2} (6.91 sq mi)
- Elevation: 131 m (430 ft)
- Highest elevation: 138 m (453 ft)
- Lowest elevation: 112 m (367 ft)
- Population (2019): 339
  - Density: 18.9/km^{2} (49.1/sq mi)
- Time zone: UTC+01:00 (CET)
  - Summer (DST): UTC+02:00 (CEST)
- Postal code: 28200
- ^{1} French Land Register data, which excludes lakes, ponds, glaciers > 1 km^{2} (0.386 sq mi or 247 acres) and river estuaries.

Civry (French pronunciation: [sivʁi]) is a former commune in the Eure-et-Loir department in northern France. On 1 January 2017, it was merged into the new commune Villemaury.

== See also ==
- Communes of the Eure-et-Loir department
