= Ozoir-le-Breuil =

- Part of Villemaury
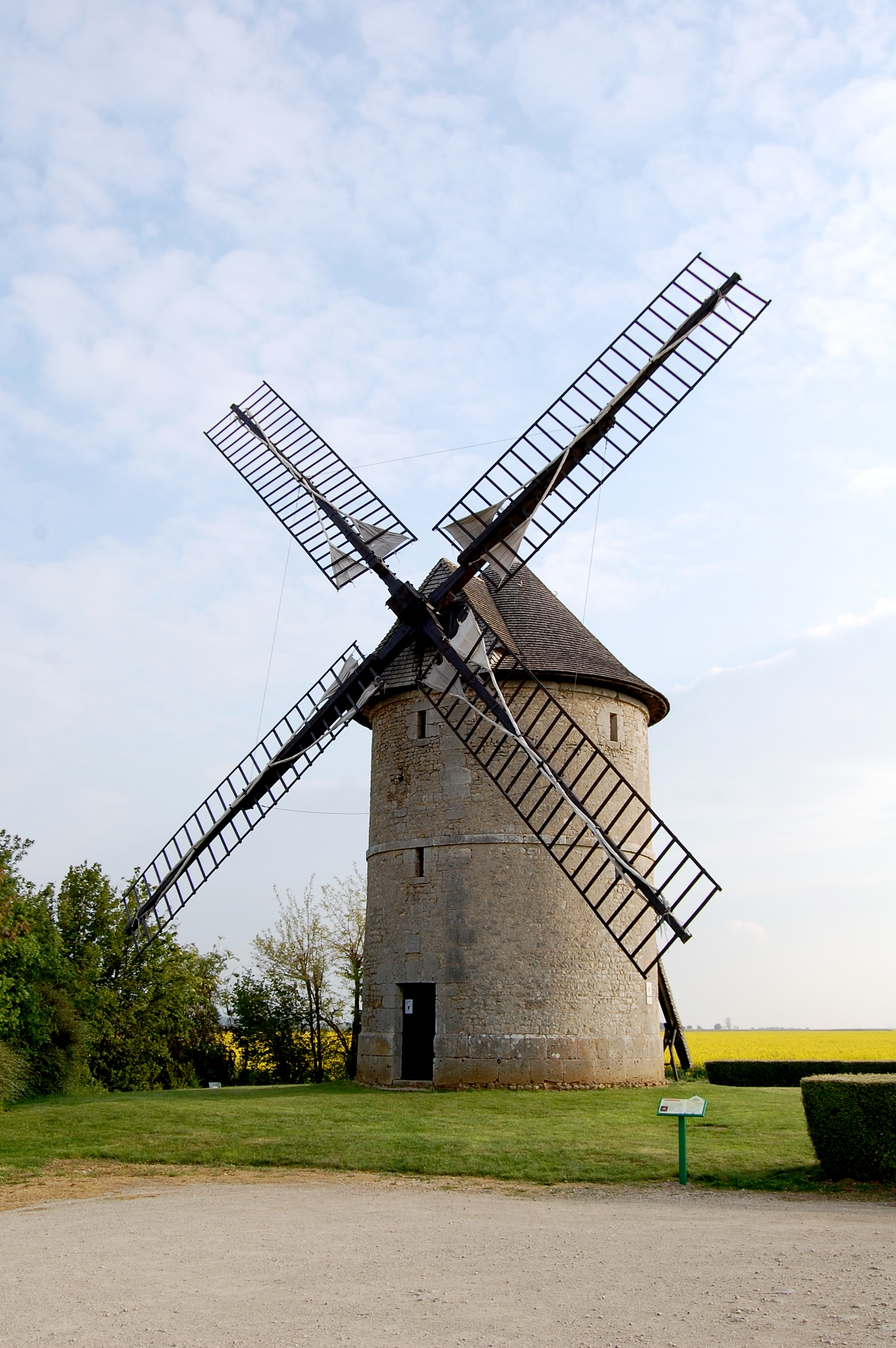
- Location of Ozoir-le-Breuil
- Location within France Location within Centre-Val de Loire
- Coordinates: 48°00′51″N 1°28′50″E
- Country: France
- Region: Centre-Val de Loire
- Department: Eure-et-Loir
- Arrondissement: Châteaudun
- Canton: Châteaudun
- Commune: Villemaury
- Area^{1}: 22.3 km^{2} (8.6 sq mi)
- Elevation: 118 m (387 ft)
- Highest elevation: 136 m (446 ft)
- Lowest elevation: 120 m (390 ft)
- Population (2019): 432
  - Density: 19.4/km^{2} (50.2/sq mi)
- Time zone: UTC+01:00 (CET)
  - Summer (DST): UTC+02:00 (CEST)
- Postal code: 28200
- ^{1} French Land Register data, which excludes lakes, ponds, glaciers > 1 km^{2} (0.386 sq mi or 247 acres) and river estuaries.

Ozoir-le-Breuil (French pronunciation: [ozwaʁ lə bʁœj]) is a former commune in the Eure-et-Loir department in northern France. On 1 January 2017, it was merged into the new commune Villemaury.

== See also ==
- Communes of the Eure-et-Loir department
