= Lutz-en-Dunois =

- Part of Villemaury
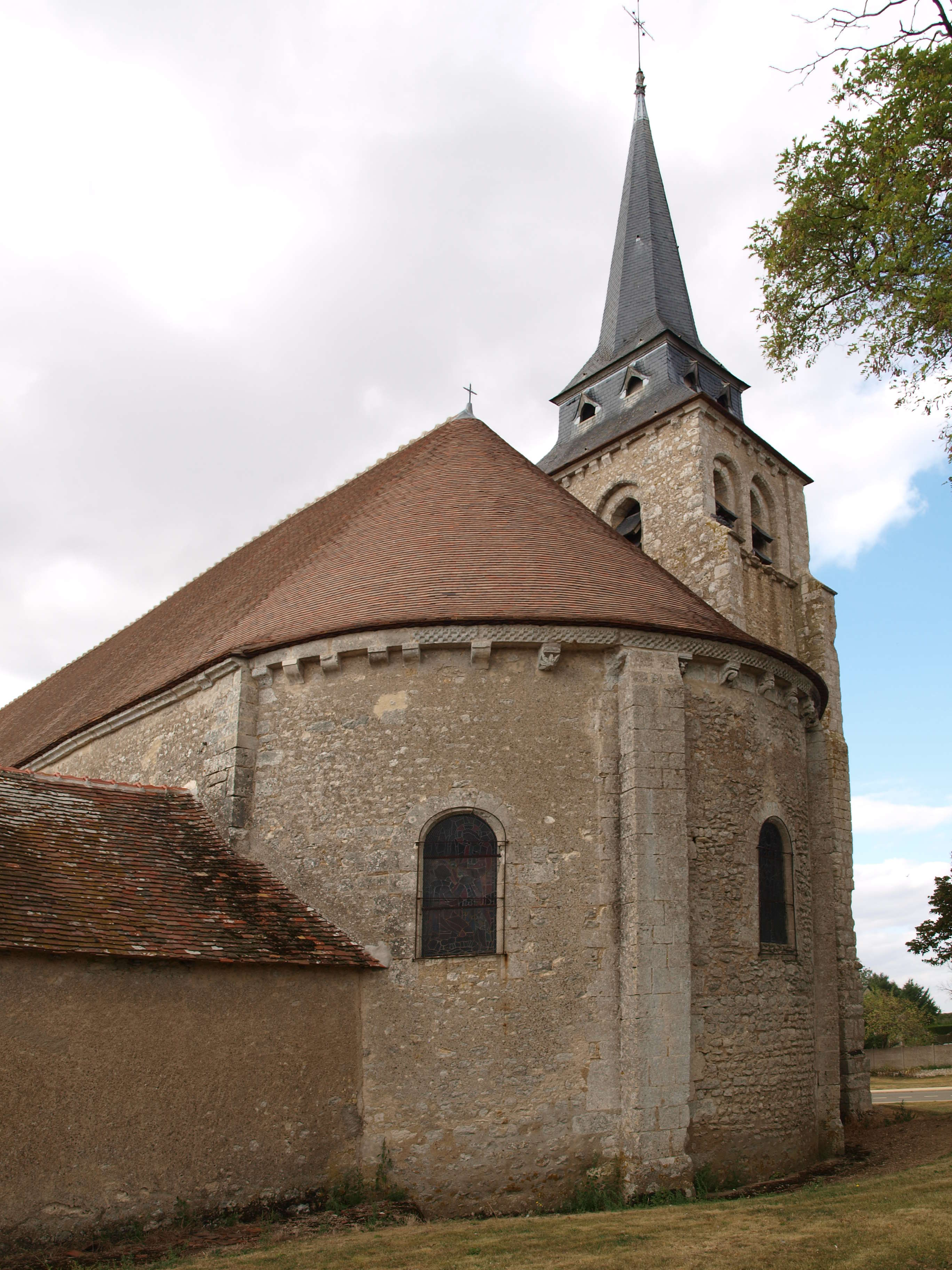
- Location of Lutz-en-Dunois
- Location within France Location within Centre-Val de Loire
- Coordinates: 48°03′36″N 1°24′54″E
- Country: France
- Region: Centre-Val de Loire
- Department: Eure-et-Loir
- Arrondissement: Châteaudun
- Canton: Châteaudun
- Commune: Villemaury
- Area^{1}: 27.48 km^{2} (10.61 sq mi)
- Elevation: 135 m (443 ft)
- Highest elevation: 138 m (453 ft)
- Lowest elevation: 122 m (400 ft)
- Population (2019): 370
  - Density: 13/km^{2} (35/sq mi)
- Time zone: UTC+01:00 (CET)
  - Summer (DST): UTC+02:00 (CEST)
- Postal code: 28200
- ^{1} French Land Register data, which excludes lakes, ponds, glaciers > 1 km^{2} (0.386 sq mi or 247 acres) and river estuaries.

Lutz-en-Dunois (French pronunciation: [lyts ɑ̃ dynwa]) is a former commune in the Eure-et-Loir department in northern France. On 1 January 2017, it was merged into the new commune Villemaury.

== See also ==
- Communes of the Eure-et-Loir department
