= Gaston Cyprès =

French footballer (1884-1925)

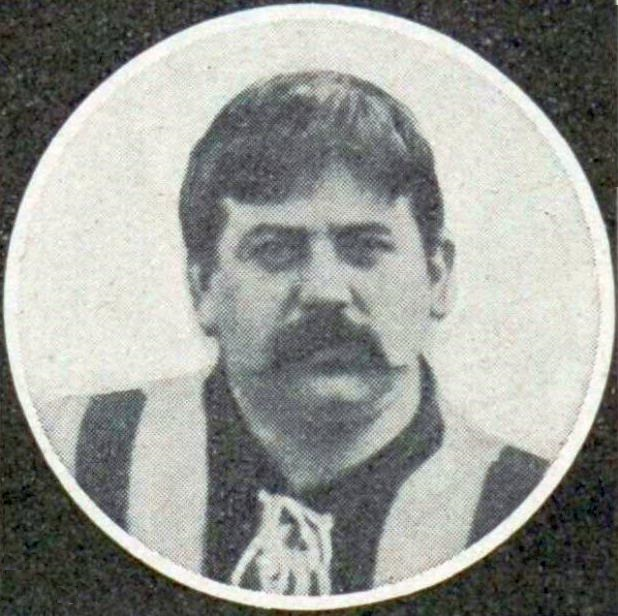

Personal information
- Full name: Gaston Cyprès
- Date of birth: 19 November 1884
- Place of birth: La Cornuaille, France
- Date of death: 17 August 1925 (aged 40)
- Place of death: Nevers, France
- Positions: Midfielder; forward

Senior career*
Years	Team	Apps	(Gls)
1903–1909	CA Paris	–	(–)

International career
1904–1908	France	6	(2)
- * Club domestic league appearances and goals

Gaston Cyprès (19 November 1884 – 17 August 1925) was a French footballer. At club level, he played as midfielder for CA Paris. He participated as striker in the inaugural match of the France national team against Belgium on 1 May 1904, becoming one of the first three French players to ever score a goal for the team. In his six matches with Les Bleus, he scored twice (in France's first two matches).
