= Alexandre Wigand =

Belgian footballer

Personal information
- Date of birth: 16 January 1881
- Date of death: 10 January 1958 (aged 76)

International career
Years	Team	Apps	(Gls)
1904–1906	Belgium	2	(0)

Alexandre Wigand (16 January 1881 – 10 January 1958) was a Belgian footballer. He played in two matches for the Belgium national football team from 1904 to 1906.
