= Charles Vanderstappen =

Belgian footballer

Personal information
- Full name: Charles Constant Vanderstappen
- Date of birth: 28 March 1884
- Place of birth: Saint-Gilles, Belgium
- Date of death: March 1962 (aged 77–78)

International career
Years	Team	Apps	(Gls)
1904–1907	Belgium	5	(0)

Charles Vanderstappen (28 March 1884 – March 1962) was a Belgian footballer. He played in five matches for the Belgium national football team from 1904 to 1907.
