= Marius Royet =

French footballer (1881-1915)

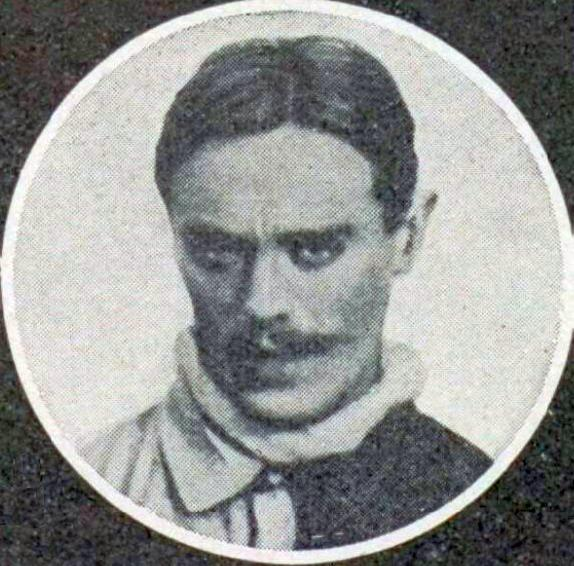

Personal information
- Full name: Marius Royet
- Date of birth: 10 January 1881
- Place of birth: France
- Date of death: 9 January 1915 (aged 33)
- Place of death: Mannheim, Grand Duchy of Baden, German Empire
- Position: Striker

Senior career*
Years	Team	Apps	(Gls)
- US Parisienne

International career
1904–1908	France	9	(2)
- * Club domestic league appearances and goals

Marius Royet (10 January 1881 – 9 January 1915) was a French international football player. Royet played for US Parisienne and was also a France international. He played in the national team's first-ever match against Belgium on 1 May 1904.
