= Alfred Verdyck =

Belgian footballer

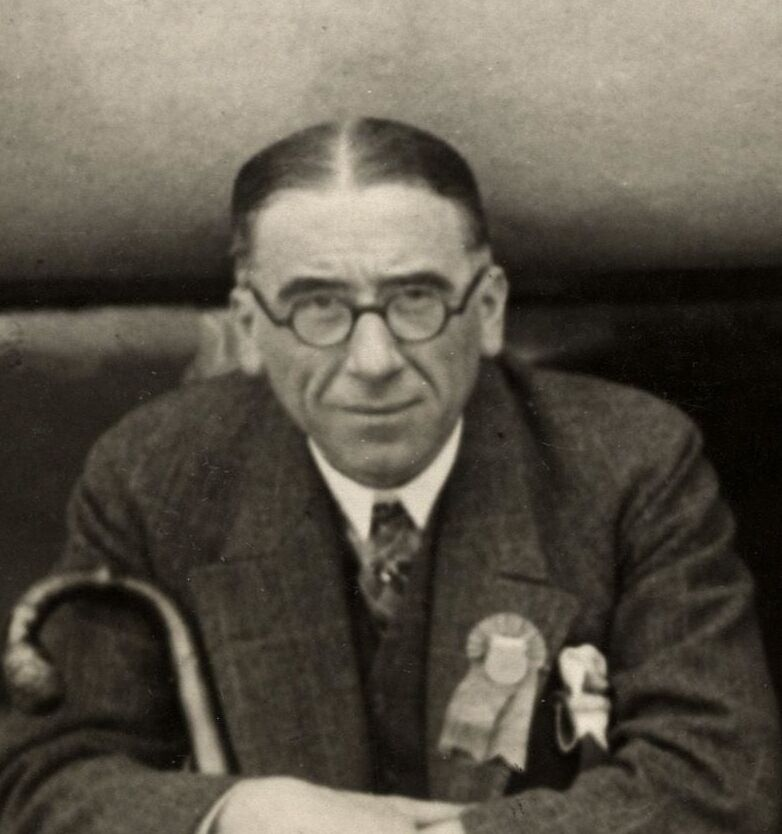
- Alfred Verdyck (1928)

Personal information
- Date of birth: 7 May 1882
- Place of birth: Belgium
- Date of death: 30 July 1964 (aged 82)
- Position: Goalkeeper

Senior career*
Years	Team	Apps	(Gls)
1900–1908	Antwerp F.C.	29	(0)

International career
1904	Belgium	1	(0)

Managerial career
- 1919–1930: Royal Antwerp F.C.
- * Club domestic league appearances and goals

Alfred Verdyck (7 May 1882 – 30 July 1964) was a Belgian footballer.

== Career ==
He was goalkeeper for Antwerp F.C. before the First World War. Later he was the first coach, known as the Great Old from 1919 to 1930. He led the anversois to their first Belgian champions title in 1929.

He played the first official match for Belgium on 1 May 1904, in Brussels against France (3-3).

== Honours ==
- Belgian international in 1904 (1 cap)
