= France national football team manager =

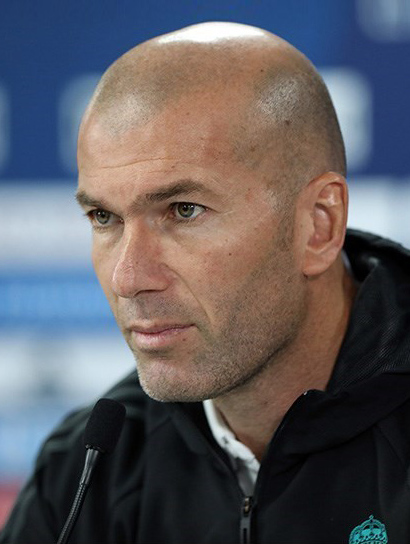
Zinedine Zidane was named manager of the France national team on 28 July 2026.

The France national football team manager was first established on 25 April 1964 following the appointment of the country's first national football team manager Henri Guérin. Before this, the France national football team was selected by a selection committee, a process in which the French Football Federation would select coaches and trainers from within the country or abroad to prepare the side for single games and tournaments, but with all decisions ultimately remaining under the control of the committee.

== History ==
=== USFSA ===
In the early 20th century, the figure of manager as known today did not yet exist, so it was the captain who had the duty of making up the line-ups and dictating the tactics to be followed; therefore, some French football historians have argued that the first coach of France was Eugène Fraysse, the captain of the French team at the 1900 Olympic Games, who decided to select mostly players from the same club to ensure the cohesion of the team.

The era of the captains came to an end with the introduction of the Commission Centrale d'Association, a selection committee headed by the USFSA. The first chairman of this committee was Robert Guérin, founder of FIFA, who organized France's inaugural match in May 1904 and then coached the team from the sidelines with the help of Ernest Weber, the correspondent for the French newspaper L'Auto, who remained a very present and influential figure in the locker room of the national team until 1907. In 1906, Guérin resigned from his position at the USFSA, which included that of coach of the Blues, (Note: Some sources wrongly state that Guérin coached France until 1908.) and was replaced by André Espir, Parisian, and André Billy, Northerner. During the years of Guérin, the French team was largely made up of only Parisians, but under Billy, the Northerners made their entrance on a large scale, thus suddenly "de-Parisianized" the selection.

=== CFI and FFF ===
In 1908, the USFSA left FIFA and its vacated place was quickly seized by French Interfederal Committee (CFI), whose president Charles Simon thus became the new coach of the national team, alongside Louis Chailloux. (Note: Some sources wrongly state that he was named Henri Chailloux.) They served as such until the outbreak of the First World War in 1914, during which Simon was killed, being replaced by Henri Delaunay.

The CFI was a forerunner for the French Football Federation, and following its creation in 1919, the committee was converted into a five-man board and lasted for 45 years, from 1919 to 1964. Gaston Barreau served as the head of the committee in two different stints; from 1920 to 1945, and again from 1949 until he died in 1958. From 1945–1949, Gabriel Hanot headed the committee and, following Barreau's death, Paul Nicolas (1958–1959) and Georges Verriest (1959–1964) controlled the committee until it was officially disbanded in 1964. During the period of the selection committee, the national team was coached by several British managers, such as Thomas Griffiths (English) in 1924, while Peter Farmer (Scottish) coached the team at the 1928 Summer Olympics, but the first official foreign manager of the team was the Romanian Ștefan Kovács, who took charge on 8 August 1973.

=== Sole managers ===
Fifteen men have occupied the post since its inception; three of those were in short-term caretaker manager roles: José Arribas and Jean Snella managed the team in dual roles and presided over four matches and former France international Just Fontaine managed the team for two matches in 1967. The longest tenure by a France national team manager is the current manager Didier Deschamps, who has managed the team since 8 July 2012. Four managers have won major tournaments while managing the national team. The first was Michel Hidalgo, who managed the team from 1976–1984, which is the second-longest tenure behind Domenech. Hidalgo won UEFA Euro 1984. In 1998, Aimé Jacquet won the 1998 FIFA World Cup on home soil and, two years later, Roger Lemerre led the team to glory at UEFA Euro 2000. Lemerre also won the 2001 FIFA Confederations Cup. Finally, current manager Didier Deschamps won the 2018 FIFA World Cup in Russia, twenty years after he lifted the trophy as captain. The current manager of the France national team is former international Didier Deschamps who replaced fellow international Laurent Blanc following the UEFA Euro 2012 on 8 July 2012.

== Statistics ==
The statistics below detail the managers of the France national football team during their tenure as manager. Though a selection committee was used from 1919–1964, the table details the managerial statistics of the coaches who were under the watch of the selection committee, though the statistics are unofficial as determined by the French Football Federation.

=== Unofficial managers ===
Manager	France tenure	Played	Won	Drawn	Lost	Win %	Competitions
(France) Eugène Fraysse	1900	2	1	0	1	50.0	1900 Summer Olympics – Bronze medal
(France) Robert Guérin	1904–1906	3	1	1	1	33.3	
(France) André Billy (France) André Espir	1906–1908	8	2	0	6	25.0	1908 Summer Olympics – First round
(France) Louis Chailloux	1908–1914	24	7	3	14	29.2	
(France) Gaston Barreau^{1}	1919–1945	124	39	13	72	31.5	1920 Summer Olympics – 4th Place; 1924 Summer Olympics – Quarter-finals; 1928 Summer Olympics – First Round; 1930 World Cup – Group stage 1934 World Cup – First round 1938 World Cup – Quarter-finals
(France) Raoul Caudron^{1}	1930						
(England) Sid Kimpton^{1}	1934–1936						
(France) Gabriel Hanot^{2}	1945–1949	21	10	2	9	47.6	1948 Summer Olympics – Quarter-finals
(France) Paul Baron and (France) Pierre Pibarot	1949–1953	30	13	7	10	43.3	1952 Summer Olympics – Preliminary round
(France) Pierre Pibarot	1953–1954	4	1	1	2	25.0	
(France) Jules Bigot and (France) Albert Batteux	1954–1956	11	5	3	3	45.5	1954 World Cup – Group stage
(France) Albert Batteux^{3}	1956–1960	36	18	9	9	50.0	1958 World Cup – 3rd Place; UEFA Euro 1960 – 4th Place
(France) Albert Batteux and (France) Henri Guérin	1960–1964	22	4	6	12	18.2	

=== Official managers ===
Manager	France tenure	Played	Won	Drawn	Lost	Win %	Competitions
(France) Henri Guérin	1964–1966	15	5	4	6	33.3	1966 World Cup – Group stage
(Spain) José Arribas and (France) Jean Snella	1966	4	2	0	2	50.0	
(France) Just Fontaine	1967	2	0	0	2	0.0	
(France) Louis Dugauguez	1967–1968	9	2	3	4	22.2	
(France) Georges Boulogne	1969–1973	31	15	5	11	48.4	
(Romania) Ștefan Kovács	1973–1975	15	6	4	5	40.0	
(France) Michel Hidalgo	1976–1984	75	41	16	18	54.7	1978 World Cup – Group stage 1982 World Cup – 4th Place; UEFA Euro 1984 – Champions
(France) Henri Michel	1984–1988	36	16	12	8	44.4	1986 World Cup – Third place
(France) Michel Platini	1988–1992	29	16	8	5	55.2	UEFA Euro 1992 – Group stage
(France) Gérard Houllier	1992–1993	12	7	1	4	58.3	
(France) Aimé Jacquet	1994–1998	53	34	16	3	64.2	UEFA Euro 1996 – Semi-finals; 1998 World Cup – Champions
(France) Roger Lemerre	1998–2002	53	34	11	8	64.2	UEFA Euro 2000 – Champions; 2001 Confederations Cup – Champions; 2002 World Cup – Group stage
(France) Jacques Santini	2002–2004	28	22	4	2	78.6	2003 Confederations Cup – Champions; UEFA Euro 2004 – Quarter-finals
(France) Raymond Domenech	2004–2010	79	41	24	14	51.9	2006 World Cup – Finalist; UEFA Euro 2008 – Group stage 2010 World Cup – Group stage
(France) Laurent Blanc	2010–2012	27	16	7	4	59.3	UEFA Euro 2012 – Quarter-finals
(France) Didier Deschamps	2012–2026	185	120	35	30	64.9	2014 World Cup – Quarter-finals; UEFA Euro 2016 – Finalist; 2018 World Cup – Champions; UEFA Euro 2020 – Round of 16; 2021 UEFA Nations League – Champions; 2022 World Cup – Finalist; UEFA Euro 2024 – Semi-finals; 2025 UEFA Nations League – Third place 2026 World Cup – 4th place
(France) Zinedine Zidane	2026–present	0	0	0	0	—	

Managers in italics were hired as caretakers

^{1}Managerial career as head of selection committee. Team was sometimes trained by physical trainers and coached by assistants. Englishman Thomas Griffiths coached the team in 1924, while Scotsman Peter Farmer coached the team at the 1928 Summer Olympics. Englishman Sid Kimpton coached the team for a portion of 1934 and 1935–36.
^{2}Managerial career as head of selection committee. Team was trained by physical trainers Bacquet, Helenio Herrera, and Paul Baron.
^{3}Batteux coached an unofficial France team composed of young players, referred to in France as Espoirs, to an 8–0 victory over Luxembourg in 1953. The match was a qualification match for the 1954 FIFA World Cup. The victory is listed in his 1956–1960 tenure as manager.
