= Georges Boulogne =

French footballer (1917–1999)

Personal information
- Date of birth: 1 July 1917
- Place of birth: Haillicourt, France
- Date of death: 24 August 1999 (aged 82)

Senior career*
Years	Team	Apps	(Gls)
- AC Amboise
- CO Saint-Dizier

Managerial career
- 1948–1950: CO Saint-Dizier
- Racing Club de Gand
- R.C.S. Verviétois
- CA Vitry
- 1955: Mulhouse
- 1969–1973: France
- * Club domestic league appearances and goals

Georges Boulogne (1 July 1917 – 24 August 1999) was a French football player and manager, better known for his stint as France national team manager.

== Career ==
Born in Haillicourt, Boulogne played amateur football for AC Amboise and CO Saint-Dizier, where he started his coaching career.

He then left France for Belgium, where he coached Racing Club de Gand and R.C.S. Verviétois. He came back to France and managed CA Vitry and Mulhouse.

He entered the FFF in 1958 as instructeur national (coaching professor) and became the national team's coach in 1969.

He gave his name to the city stadium of Amboise.
