= Jean Snella =

French footballer (1914–1979)

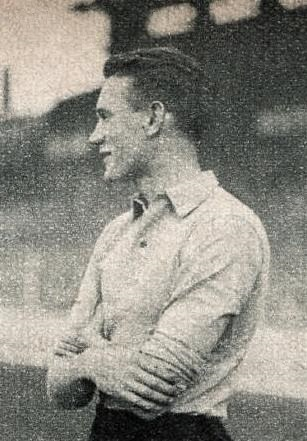
- Snella in 1938

Personal information
- Date of birth: 9 December 1914
- Place of birth: Dortmund-Mengede, German Empire
- Date of death: 20 November 1979 (aged 64)
- Place of death: Metz, France
- Position: Midfielder

Senior career*
Years	Team	Apps	(Gls)
1934–1938	Olympique Lillois		
1938–1940	Saint-Étienne		
1942–1945	Saint-Étienne		

Managerial career
- 1946–1948: Lorient
- 1948–1950: Saint-Étienne (amateurs)
- 1950–1959: Saint-Étienne
- 1958: France (assistant)
- 1959–1963: Servette
- 1963–1967: Saint-Étienne
- 1966: France
- 1967–1971: Servette
- 1971–1974: Nice
- 1975–1977: NA Hussein Dey
- 1979: Metz
- * Club domestic league appearances and goals

Jean Snella (9 December 1914 – 20 November 1979) was a French football player and manager. A midfielder, he spent most of his playing career with Saint-Étienne and also had multiple coaching spells with the club. He coached the France national team along with José Arribas after the 1966 FIFA World Cup.

== Biography ==
Jean Snella was born in Germany to Polish parents. Before 1935 he was working as a mechanic. He acquired French nationality by naturalization on 21 October 1935.

In 1940, he was made Prisoner of War in Évreux by the Wehrmacht but managed to escape in 1942.

== Honours ==
Saint-Étienne

- Division 1: 1957, 1964, 1967

Servette

- Axpo Super League: 1961, 1962
- Schweizer Cup: 1971
