= Henri Guérin (footballer) =

French footballer and manager (1921-1995)

Personal information
- Full name: Henri Lucien Guérin
- Date of birth: 27 August 1921
- Place of birth: Montmirail, Marne, France
- Date of death: 2 April 1995 (aged 73)
- Place of death: Saint-Coulomb, Ille-et-Vilaine, France
- Position: Defender

Senior career*
Years	Team	Apps	(Gls)
- Tour d'Auvergne Rennes
1943–1944	Équipe fédérale Rennes-Bretagne		
1944	Drapeau de Fougères		
1945	Tour d'Auvergne Rennes		
1945–1951	Rennes		
1951–1953	Stade Français		
1953–1955	AS Aix		
1955–1961	Rennes		

International career
1948–1949	France	3	(0)

Managerial career
- 1955–1961: Rennes
- 1961–1962: Saint-Étienne
- 1962–1966: France
- * Club domestic league appearances and goals

Henri Lucien Guérin (French pronunciation: [ɑ̃ʁi lysjɛ̃ ɡeʁɛ̃]; 27 August 1921 – 2 April 1995) was a French football player, who played as a defender, and a manager. He coached the France national team at the 1966 FIFA World Cup.

== Honours ==
Orders

- Knight of the Legion of Honour: 1992
