= José Arribas =

French footballer and manager (1921-1989)

Personal information
- Date of birth: 16 January 1921
- Place of birth: Bilbao, Spain
- Date of death: 28 September 1989 (aged 68)
- Place of death: Nantes, France
- Position: Midfielder

Senior career*
Years	Team	Apps	(Gls)
1948–1952	Le Mans		

Managerial career
- 1952–1954: Saint-Malo
- 1954–1960: Noyen-sur-Sarthe
- 1960–1976: Nantes
- 1966: France
- 1976–1977: Marseille
- 1977–1983: Lille
- * Club domestic league appearances and goals

José Arribas (16 January 1921 – 28 September 1989) was a Spanish professional football player and manager. As a player, he was a midfielder. He mostly notably coached Nantes from 1960 to 1976, where he created the "jeu à la nantaise", a tactic based on speed, technique, intelligence and one touch play. He also coached the France national team along with Jean Snella after the 1966 FIFA World Cup.

== Career ==
At the age of 14, Arribas left Spain for France because of the Spanish Civil War, and landed in Nantes. Fond of football, he signed a professional contract with Le Mans in the Division 2. In 1952, he became a coach and trained amateur sides of Saint-Malo and Noyen-sur-Sarthe, before being called up by Nantes, where he won the Division 1 titles in 1965, 1966 and 1973. In 1966, he coached for four matches France national team with Jean Snella. Arribas left Nantes in 1976, and ended his career coaching Marseille and Lille.

== Personal life ==
Arribas's son Claude was also a footballer. He coached him at Nantes.

== Honours ==
Nantes

- Division 1: 1964–65, 1965–66, 1972–73

== See also ==
- List of longest managerial reigns in association football
