= France national football team =

Men's association football team

France
- Nickname: Les Bleus (The Blues)
- Association: Fédération Française de Football (FFF)
- Confederation: UEFA (Europe)
- Head coach: Zinedine Zidane
- Captain: Kylian Mbappé
- Most caps: Hugo Lloris (145)
- Top scorer: Kylian Mbappé (67)
- Home stadium: Stade de France
- FIFA code: FRA
First colours	Second colours

FIFA ranking
- Current: 3 (18 November 2026)
- Highest: 1 (Note: May 2001 – May 2002; August – September 2018; April – June 2026)
- Lowest: 26 (September 2010)

First international
- Belgium 3–3 France (Uccle, Belgium; 1 May 1904)

Biggest win
- France 14–0 Gibraltar (Nice, France; 18 November 2023)

Biggest defeat
- Denmark 17–1 France (London, England; 22 October 1908)

World Cup
- Appearances: 17 (first in 1930)
- Best result: Champions (1998, 2018)

European Championship
- Appearances: 11 (first in 1960)
- Best result: Champions (1984, 2000)

Nations League Finals
- Appearances: 2 (first in 2021)
- Best result: Champions (2021)

CONMEBOL–UEFA Cup of Champions
- Appearances: 1 (first in 1985)
- Best result: Champions (1985)

Confederations Cup
- Appearances: 2 (first in 2001)
- Best result: Champions (2001, 2003)
Medal record
Men's football
FIFA World Cup
Gold medal – first place	1998 France	Team
Gold medal – first place	2018 Russia	Team
Silver medal – second place	2006 Germany	Team
Silver medal – second place	2022 Qatar	Team
Bronze medal – third place	1958 Sweden	Team
Bronze medal – third place	1986 Mexico	Team
FIFA Confederations Cup
Gold medal – first place	2001 South Korea and Japan	Team
Gold medal – first place	2003 France	Team
UEFA European Championship
Gold medal – first place	1984 France	Team
Gold medal – first place	2000 Netherlands and Belgium	Team
Silver medal – second place	2016 France	Team
UEFA Nations League
Gold medal – first place	2021 Italy	Team
Bronze medal – third place	2025 Germany	Team
CONMEBOL–UEFA Cup of Champions
Gold medal – first place	1985 France	Team

The France national football team (Note: French: Équipe de France de football) represents France in men's international football. It is overseen by the French Football Federation (FFF; Fédération française de football), the governing body for football in France. It is a member of UEFA in Europe and FIFA in global competitions. The team's colours and imagery reference two national symbols: the Flag of France and Gallic rooster (coq gaulois). The team is colloquially known as Les Bleus (The Blues). They play home matches at the Stade de France in Saint-Denis and train at the INF (Institut National du Football) in Clairefontaine-en-Yvelines.

Founded in 1904, the national team has won two FIFA World Cups, two UEFA European Championships, one CONMEBOL–UEFA Cup of Champions, two FIFA Confederations Cups and one UEFA Nations League title. France was one of the four European teams that participated in the first World Cup in 1930. Twenty-eight years later, the team led by Raymond Kopa and Just Fontaine finished in third place at the 1958 World Cup. France experienced much of its success in three different eras: in the 1980s, the late 1990s to early 2000s, and the late 2010s to early 2020s.

In the early to mid-1980s, under the leadership of the three-time Ballon d'Or winner Michel Platini, France won Euro 1984 (its first official title), a CONMEBOL–UEFA Cup (1985), and reached two consecutive World Cup semi-finals (1982 and 1986). During the captaincy of Didier Deschamps, with Zinedine Zidane being the star player, Les Bleus won the 1998 World Cup and Euro 2000. They also won the Confederations Cup in 2001 and 2003. Three years later, France made it to the final of the 2006 World Cup, losing 5–3 on penalties to Italy. A decade later, the team reached the final of Euro 2016, where they lost 1–0 to Portugal in extra time. Two years after that, France won the 2018 World Cup, its second title in that competition. After winning the 2021 Nations League, they became the first, and so far, the only European national team to have won every senior FIFA and UEFA competition. In 2022, France reached a second consecutive World Cup final, losing to Argentina in a penalty shoot-out.

France is one of two countries, the other being Brazil, to have won every FIFA men's 11-player competition at every age level, (Note: Attributed to multiple references:) having claimed the FIFA World Cup, FIFA U-20 World Cup, FIFA U-17 World Cup, the now-defunct FIFA Confederations Cup, and an Olympic title.

France shares historic footballing rivalries with other European nations, most notably Italy, Germany, Belgium, and Spain. A bitter rivalry with Argentina also developed and intensified in the late 2010s and early 2020s, defined by two consecutive World Cup knockout stage matches (round of 16 in 2018 and final in 2022).

== History ==
=== Early years (1900–1930s) ===
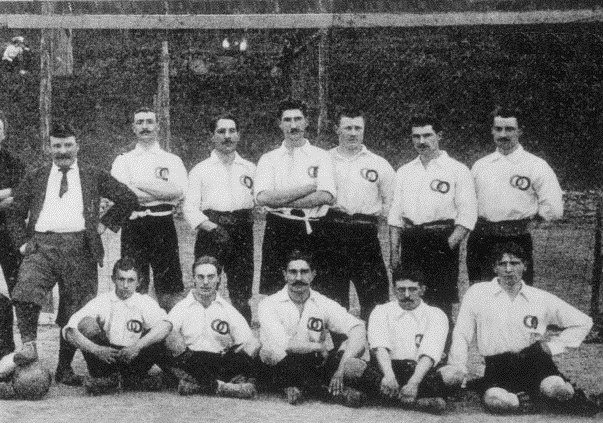
France national team that played its first international v Belgium in 1904

The France national football team was created in 1904, around the time of FIFA's foundation. The team competed in its first official international match on 1 May 1904 against Belgium in Brussels, ending in a 3–3 draw. The following year, on 12 February 1905, France contested their first-ever home match against Switzerland. The match was played at the Parc des Princes in front of 500 supporters. France won the match 1–0 with the only goal coming from Gaston Cyprès. Due to disagreements between FIFA and the Union des Sociétés Françaises de Sports Athlétiques (USFSA), the country's sports union, France struggled to establish an identity. On 9 May 1908, the French Interfederal Committee (CFI), a rival organization to the USFSA, ruled that FIFA would now be responsible for the club's appearances in forthcoming Olympic Games and not the USFSA. In 1919, the CFI transformed themselves into the French Football Federation (FFF). In 1921, the USFSA finally merged with the FFF.

In July 1930, France appeared in the inaugural FIFA World Cup, held in Uruguay. In their first-ever World Cup match, France defeated Mexico 4–1 at the Estadio Pocitos in Montevideo. Lucien Laurent scored the first goal in World Cup history. Conversely, France also became the first team to not score in a World Cup match after losing 1–0 to group stage opponents Argentina. Another loss to Chile resulted in the team bowing out in the group stage. The following year saw the first selection of a black player to the national team. Raoul Diagne, who was of Senegalese descent, earned his first cap on 15 February in a 2–1 defeat to Czechoslovakia. Diagne later played with the team at the 1938 World Cup, alongside Larbi Benbarek, who was one of the first players of North African origin to play for the national team. At the 1934 World Cup, France suffered elimination in the opening round, losing 3–2 to Austria. On the team's return to Paris, they were greeted as heroes by a crowd of over 4,000 supporters. France hosted the 1938 World Cup and reached the quarterfinals, losing 3–1 to defending champions (and eventual 1938 winners) Italy.

=== 1950s–1980s ===
France's first 'Golden Generation' in the late 1950s comprised players such as Just Fontaine, Raymond Kopa, Jean Vincent, Robert Jonquet, Maryan Wisnieski, Thadée Cisowski, and Armand Penverne. At the 1958 World Cup, France reached the semi-finals where they lost to Brazil. In the 3rd-place match, France defeated West Germany 6–3 with Fontaine recording four goals, which brought his goal tally in the competition to 13, a World Cup record that still stands today. France hosted the inaugural UEFA European Football Championship in 1960. For the second straight international tournament, the team reached the semi-finals, but were defeated 5–4 by Yugoslavia despite being up 4–2 heading into the 75th minute. In the third-place match, France was defeated 2–0 by Czechoslovakia.

The 1960s and 1970s saw France decline significantly playing under several managers and failing to qualify for numerous international tournaments. On 25 April 1962, Henri Guérin was officially installed as the team's first manager. Under Guérin, France failed to qualify for the 1962 World Cup and the 1964 European Nations' Cup. The team returned to major tournament play by qualifying for the 1966 World Cup, but did not make it past the group stage phase of the tournament. Guérin was fired following the World Cup. He was replaced by José Arribas and Jean Snella, who worked as caretaker managers in dual roles. The two only lasted four matches and were replaced by former international Just Fontaine, who in turn was only in charge for two matches. Louis Dugauguez succeeded Fontaine and following his early struggles in qualification for the 1970 World Cup, was fired and replaced by Georges Boulogne, who could not get the team to the competition. Boulogne was later fired following his failure to qualify for the 1974 World Cup and was replaced by the Romanian Ștefan Kovács, who became the only international manager to ever manage the national team. Under the management of Kovács, France failed to qualify for UEFA Euro 1976. After two years in charge, he was sacked and replaced by Michel Hidalgo.

Under Hidalgo, France flourished, mainly due to players such as defenders Marius Trésor and Maxime Bossis, striker Dominique Rocheteau and midfielder Michel Platini. These players, alongside Jean Tigana, Alain Giresse and Luis Fernández, formed the "carré magique" ("Magic Square"), which would haunt opposing defenses beginning at the 1982 World Cup. France reached the semi-finals losing on penalties to West Germany. The semi-final match-up is considered one of the greatest matches in World Cup history and was marked by controversy. France finished fourth overall, losing the third-place playoff 3–2 to Poland. France earned their first major international honor two years later, winning Euro 1984, which they hosted. Under the leadership of Platini, who scored a tournament-high nine goals, France defeated Spain 2–0 in the final. Platini and Bruno Bellone scored, before Hidalgo departed the team in order for Henri Michel to take over. France subsequently won gold at the 1984 Summer Olympics football tournament and, a year later, defeated Uruguay 2–0 to win the Artemio Franchi Trophy, an early precursor to the FIFA Confederations Cup. In a span of a year, France were holders of three of the four major international trophies. At the 1986 World Cup, France reached the semi-finals, losing a rematch to West Germany, but achieved third place with a 4–2 victory over Belgium.

In 1988, the FFF opened the Clairefontaine National Football Institute. Its opening ceremony was attended by then-President of France, François Mitterrand. Five months after Clairefontaine's opening, manager Henri Michel was fired and was replaced by Michel Platini, who failed to get the team to the 1990 World Cup.

=== Zidane era and World Champions (1995–2006) ===
Under Gerard Houllier, France and its supporters experienced a major disappointment in failing to qualify for the 1994 World Cup. With two matches to play, qualification had been all but secured with matches remaining against last-placed Israel and in-contention Bulgaria. However, France was upset at home by Israel 3–2 after leading 2–1 late in the match and, against Bulgaria, conceded a 90th-minute goal for a 2–1 defeat. The subsequent blame and public outcry led to the firing of Houllier and departure of several players, from the national team fold. Houllier's assistant Aimé Jacquet was appointed as manager.

France starting line-up against Brazil at the 1998 FIFA World Cup final, a match they won 3–0

Under Jacquet, the national team achieved multiple successes. The squad comprised some experienced players from the group that had failed to reach the 1994 World Cup as well as some talented younger players, such as Zinedine Zidane. The team reached the semi-finals of Euro 1996, where they lost 6–5 on penalties to the Czech Republic. The team's next major tournament was the 1998 World Cup, which France hosted. France went through the tournament undefeated and became the seventh nation to win the World Cup, defeating Brazil 3–0 in the final at the Stade de France in Paris. Jacquet stepped down after the country's World Cup triumph and was succeeded by assistant Roger Lemerre who guided them through Euro 2000. Led by FIFA World Player of the Year Zidane, France defeated Italy 2–1 in the final. David Trezeguet scored the golden goal in extra time. The victory gave the team the distinction of holding both the World Cup and Euro titles, a feat first achieved by West Germany in 1974; this was also the first time that a reigning World Cup winner went on to capture the Euro. Following the result, the France national team was accorded the number one spot in the FIFA World Rankings. In the following year, the team won the 2001 FIFA Confederations Cup.

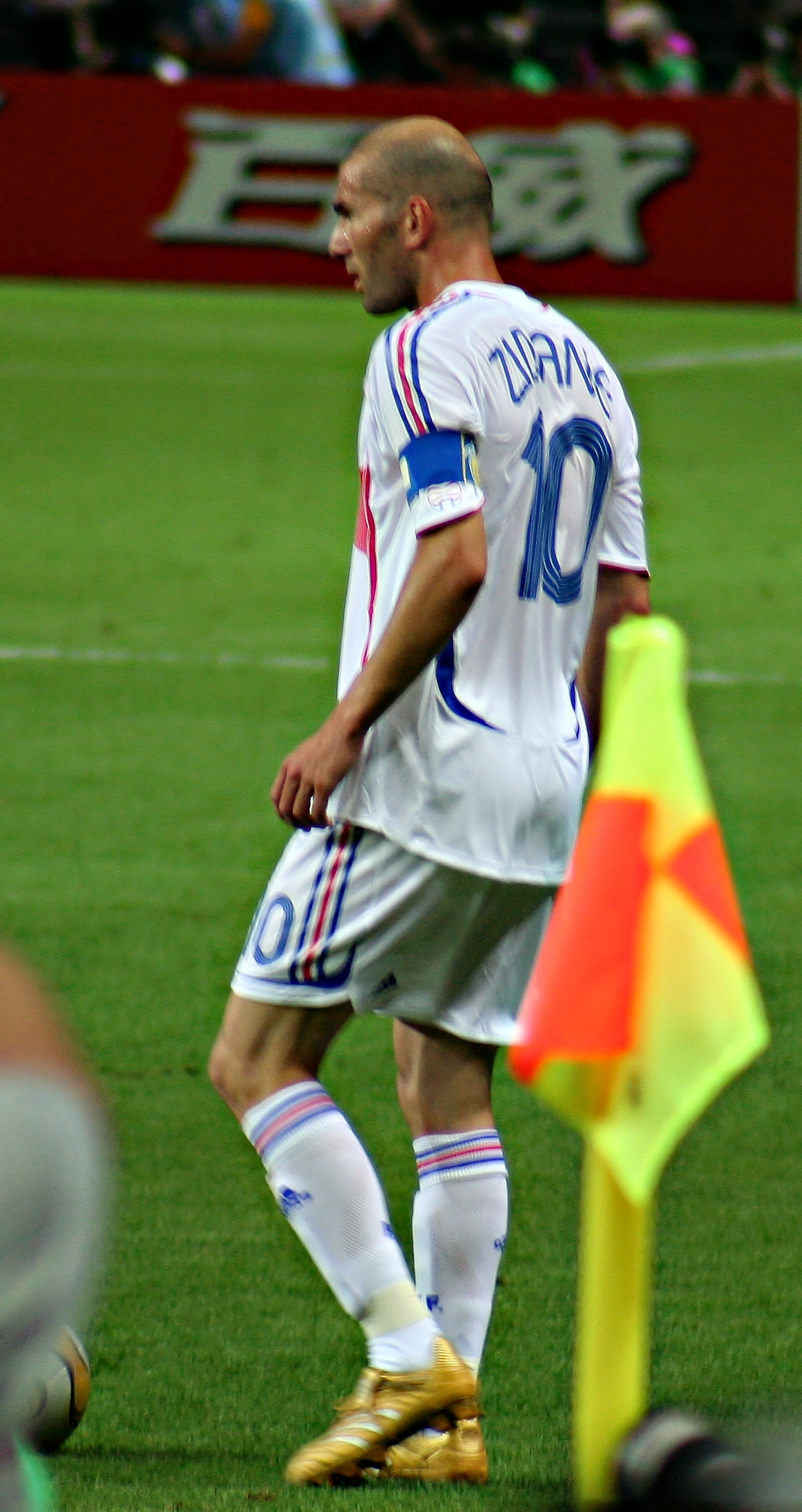
Zinedine Zidane captaining France at the 2006 FIFA World Cup

After this period of achievement, France were much less successful in subsequent tournaments, and failed to make it past the group stage at the 2002 World Cup. One of the greatest shocks in World Cup history saw France defeated 1–0 by debutantes Senegal in the opening game of the tournament. France became only the second nation to be eliminated in the first round as World Cup holders, the first being Brazil in 1966. After the 2010, 2014, and 2018 World Cups, Italy, Spain, and Germany were also added to this list. After France finished bottom of the group, Lemerre was dismissed and was replaced by Jacques Santini. A full-strength team started out strongly at Euro 2004, but they were upset in the quarter-finals by the eventual winners Greece. Santini resigned as coach and Raymond Domenech was picked as his replacement. France struggled in the early qualifiers for the 2006 World Cup. This prompted Domenech to persuade several past members out of international retirement to help the national team qualify, which they accomplished following a convincing 4–0 win over Cyprus on the final day of qualifying.

In the 2006 World Cup final stages, France finished undefeated in their group and advanced to the final, defeating Spain, Brazil, and Portugal in the knockout matches. France played Italy in the final, with the match finishing 1–1 after extra time. Zinedine Zidane had given France an early lead through a Panenka penalty which hit the crossbar before bouncing past the goal line, however Italy defender Marco Materazzi equalised from a header seven minutes later. Italy ended up winning 5–3 on penalties. The match featured an incident during extra time between Zidane and Materazzi in which Zidane headbutted Materazzi on the chest and was sent off. This was Zidane's last appearance in a football match as he announced previously that he would retire from football after the 2006 World Cup.

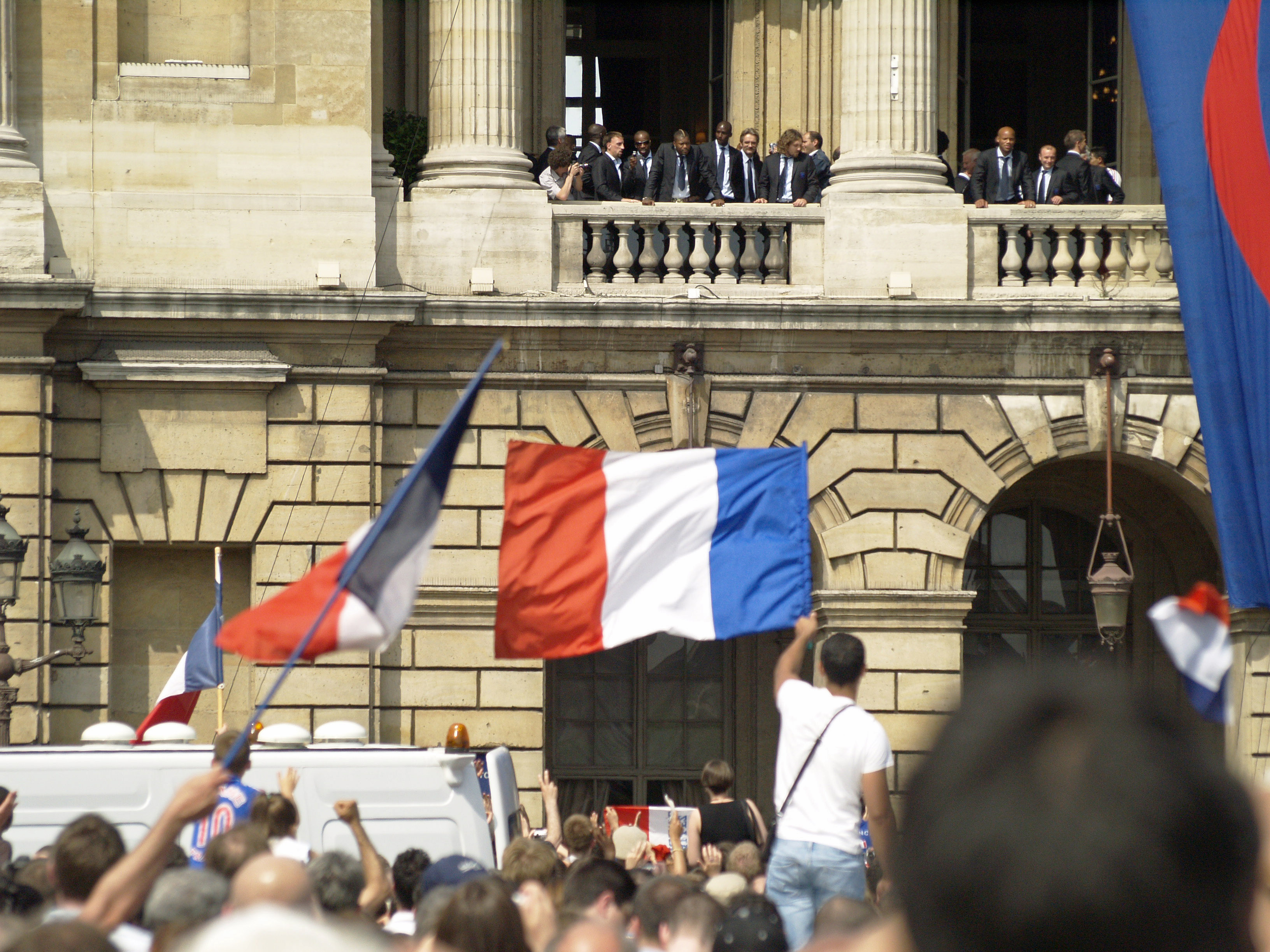
The French team in front of fans after the 2006 World Cup

=== Decline and rebuild (2007–2015) ===
France started its qualifying round for Euro 2008 strong and qualified for the tournament, despite two defeats to Scotland. After the performance in the qualifiers, France performed poorly at the final tournament, ending in last place of their group, behind Netherlands, Italy and Romania, obtaining just one point after a 0–0 draw with the Romanian side. Just like the team's previous World Cup qualifying campaign, the 2010 campaign got off to a disappointing start with France suffering disastrous losses and earning uninspired victories. France eventually finished second in the group and earned a spot in the UEFA play-offs against the Republic of Ireland for a place in South Africa. In the first leg, France defeated the Irish 1–0 and in the second leg procured a 1–1 draw, via a controversial act by France forward Thierry Henry, to qualify for the 2010 FIFA World Cup.

At the finals in South Africa, the team continued to underperform and were eliminated in the group stage, while the negative publicity the national team received during the competition led to further repercussions back in France. Midway through the competition, striker Nicolas Anelka was dismissed from the national team after reportedly having a dispute, in which obscenities were passed, with team manager Raymond Domenech during half-time of the team's loss to Mexico. The resulting disagreement over Anelka's expulsion between the players, the coaching staff and FFF officials resulted in the players boycotting training before their third game. In response to the training boycott, Sports Minister Roselyne Bachelot lectured the players and "reduced France's disgraced World Cup stars to tears with an emotional speech on the eve of their final group A match". France then lost their final game 2–1 to hosts South Africa and failed to advance to the knockout stage. The day after the team's elimination, it was reported by numerous media outlets that then President of France Nicolas Sarkozy would meet with team captain Thierry Henry to discuss the issues associated with the team's meltdown at the World Cup, at Henry's request. Following the completion of the World Cup tournament, Federation President Jean-Pierre Escalettes resigned from his position.

Domenech, whose contract had expired, was succeeded as head coach by former international Laurent Blanc. On 23 July 2010, at the request of Blanc, the FFF suspended all 23 players in the World Cup squad for the team's friendly match against Norway after the World Cup. On 6 August, five players who were deemed to have played a major role in the training boycott were disciplined for their roles, and Nicolas Anelka also received an 18-match ban, effectively ending the forward's international career.

At Euro 2012 in Poland and Ukraine, France reached the quarter-finals, where they were beaten by eventual champions Spain. Following the tournament, coach Laurent Blanc resigned and was succeeded by Didier Deschamps, who captained France to glory in the 1998 World Cup and Euro 2000. His team qualified for the 2014 World Cup by beating Ukraine in the play-offs. At the 2014 World Cup, France lost to eventual champions Germany in the quarter-finals courtesy of an early goal by Mats Hummels.

=== Renewed success (2016–present) ===
France automatically qualified as hosts for UEFA Euro 2016, advancing to the knockout stages, where they defeated the Republic of Ireland and Iceland. In the semi-final, France defeated Germany 2–0, marking their first win over Germany at a major tournament since 1958. France, however, were beaten by Portugal 1–0 in the final courtesy of an extra-time goal by Eder.

France starting line-up against Croatia at the 2018 FIFA World Cup final, a match they won 4–2

At the 2018 World Cup, France finished on top of their group to advance to the round of 16. They subsequently defeated Argentina 4–3 in a thrilling match and then Uruguay 2–0 to qualify for the semi-final stage, where they beat Belgium 1–0 courtesy of a goal from defender Samuel Umtiti. France approached this semi-final in a diametrically opposed way to Japan in the round of 16 against these same Belgians: Les Bleus played low block to not leave any space to the Belgians and in counter-attack, this defensive approach was successful unlike Japan's overly offensive and open game (which led to the three Belgian goals while Japan was leading 2–0), even if this led to criticism from some Belgian players who felt they were better than France. On 15 July, France beat Croatia in the final 4–2 to win the World Cup for the second time.

UEFA Euro 2020 was postponed until 2021 due to the COVID-19 pandemic. At Euro 2020, France finished top of a group containing Germany, Portugal and Hungary, which was described by pundits as the "group of death". However, they were eliminated by Switzerland in the round of 16. The Swiss had held France to a 3–3 draw in normal time before winning on penalties. France would go on to win the 2020–21 edition of the UEFA Nations League, after winning advancement to the final tournament from a group consisting of inaugural champions Portugal. France defeated Spain 2–1 in the final for their first title.

At the 2022 FIFA World Cup, France looked to defend their title in Qatar. After finishing top of their group, France did manage to reach a second successive World Cup final, defeating Poland, England and Morocco in the knockout stages. However, they were defeated on penalties by Argentina after a thrilling 3–3 draw.

France qualified for UEFA Euro 2024 in Germany, where they finished second in the group stage following a victory over Austria 1–0 and two draws against Netherlands (0–0) and Poland (1–1), therefore advancing to the knockout stage. They defeated Belgium 1–0 in the round of 16 and later advanced to the semi-finals after defeating Portugal in penalties following a 0–0 draw. France were later defeated by Spain 2–1 in the semi-finals, with this becoming their first defeat in regular time since losing to Germany at the 2014 World Cup.

In 2025, Didier Deschamps confirmed he will leave when his contract expires after the 2026 World Cup in North America. At the tournament, France opened group play with a 3–1 victory over Senegal. During the match, Kylian Mbappé scored two goals to reach a career total of 58 international goals, surpassing Olivier Giroud to become the all-time leading goalscorer in the history of the France national team. France was eliminated by Spain in the semifinal following a 0–2 score, the third consecutive major tournament where the national team of France was eliminated in a semifinal by them, leading French media to dub the Spanish side as France's "Bête Noire". France finished fourth after losing the match for third place against England, marking the end of Deschamps managerial tenure with France.

== Home stadium ==
During France's early years, the team's national stadium alternated between the Parc des Princes in Paris and the Stade Olympique Yves-du-Manoir in Colombes. France also hosted matches at the Stade Pershing, Stade de Paris, and the Stade Buffalo, but to a minimal degree. As time passed, France began hosting matches outside the city of Paris at such venues as the Stade Marcel Saupin in Nantes, the Stade Vélodrome in Marseille, the Stade de Gerland in Lyon, and the Stade de la Meinau in Strasbourg.

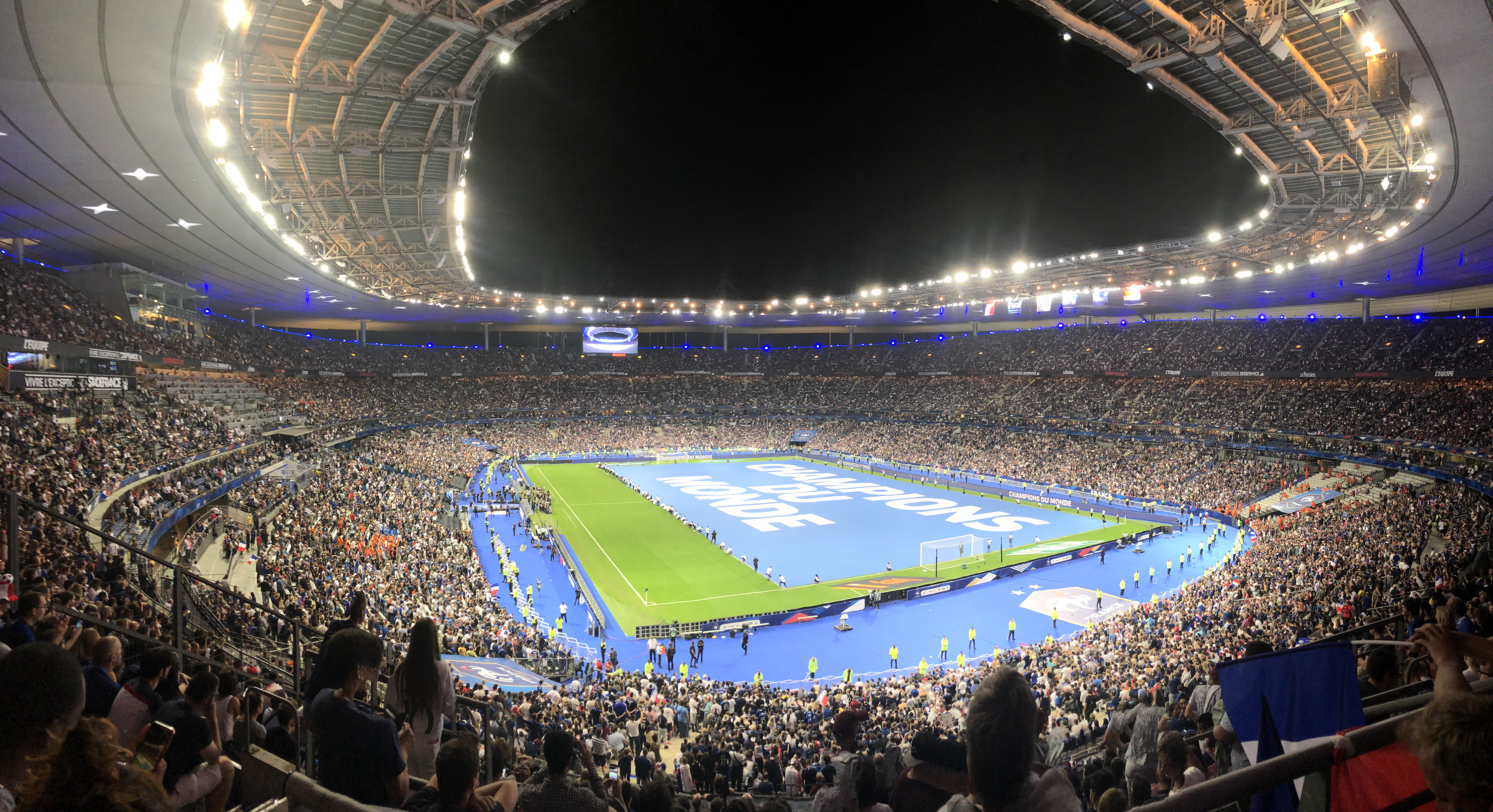
Stade de France

Following the renovation of the Parc des Princes in 1972, which gave the stadium the largest capacity in Paris, France moved into the venue permanently. The team still hosted friendly matches and minor World Cup and UEFA Euro qualification matches at other venues. France have played home matches in a French overseas department twice – in 2005 against Costa Rica in Fort-de-France (Martinique) and in 2010 against China in Saint Pierre (Réunion). Both matches were friendlies.

In 1998, the Stade de France was inaugurated as France's national stadium ahead of the 1998 World Cup. Located in Saint-Denis, a Parisian suburb, the stadium has an all-seater capacity of 81,338. France's first match at the stadium was played on 28 January 1998 against Spain. France won the match 1–0, with Zinedine Zidane scoring the goal. Since that match, France has used the stadium for almost every major home game, including the 1998 World Cup final.

Prior to matches, home or away, the national team trains at the INF Clairefontaine academy in Clairefontaine-en-Yvelines. Clairefontaine is the national association football centre and is among 12 élite academies throughout the country. The centre was inaugurated in 1976 by former FFF president Fernand Sastre and opened in 1988. The center drew media spotlight following its usage as a base camp by the team that won the 1998 World Cup.

In the 20th and 23rd minute of an international friendly on 13 November 2015, against Germany, three groups of terrorists attempted to detonate bomb vests, at three entrances of Stade de France, and two explosions occurred. Play would continue, until the 94th minute, in order to keep the crowd from panicking. Consequently, the stadium was evacuated through the unaffected gates of the stadium away from the players benches. Due to the blocked exits, spectators who could not leave the stadium had to go down to the pitch and wait until it was safer. As a result of the attacks, both teams would remain in the stadium until the day after.

== Team image ==
=== Media coverage ===
The national team has a broadcasting agreement with TF1 Group, who the Federal Council of the FFF agreed to extend its exclusive broadcasting agreement with the channel. The new deal grants the channel exclusive broadcast rights for the matches of national team, which include friendlies and international games for the next four seasons beginning in August 2010 and ending in June 2014. TF1 will also have extended rights, notably on the Internet, and may also broadcast images of the national team in its weekly program, Téléfoot. The FFF will receive €45 million a season, a €10 million decrease from the €55 million they received from the previous agreement reached in 2006.

After France won their second World Cup in 2018, M6 together with TF1 broadcast all international fixtures featuring France respectively until 2022.

==== Friendlies and qualifiers ====
Television channel	Period
ORTF	1954–1974
Antenne 2	1975–1984
TF1	1984–2026
M6	2009–2022
TMC (friendly match only)	2018–2022
L'Équipe (UEFA Nations League match on rebroadcast)	2018–2023

==== Finals tournament ====
Television channel	Period
FIFA World Cup
ORTF	1954, 1958, 1966
TF1	1978–1986, 1998–2022
France Télévisions	1978–1986 (Antenne 2), 1998
M6	2026
UEFA European Championship
ORTF	1960
TF1	1984, 1992–2024
France Télévisions	1984, 1992 (Antenne 2), 1996–2004
M6	2008–2024

=== Kits and crest ===
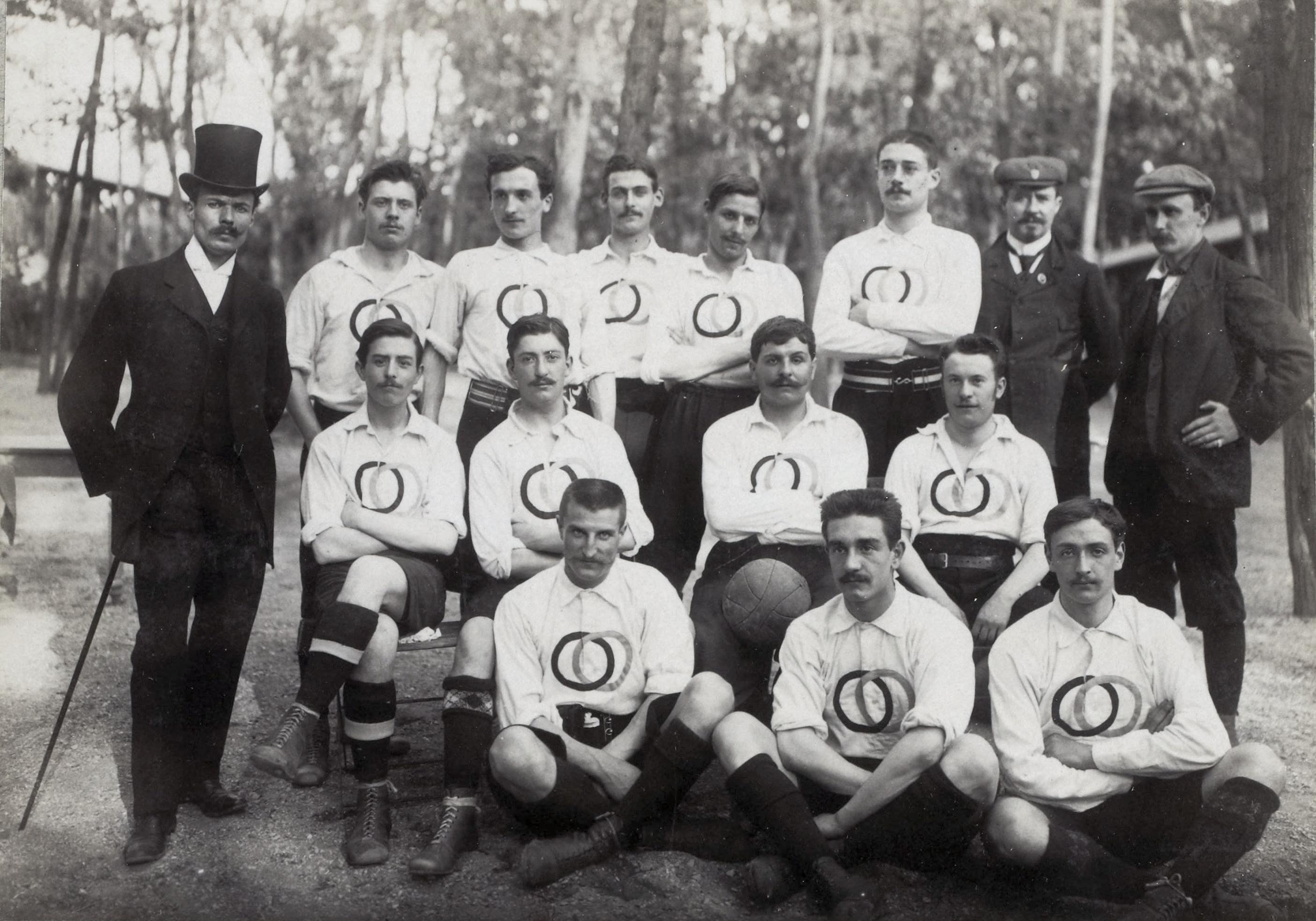
USFSA team that represented France at the 1900 Summer Olympics, wearing a white shirt with the rings emblem. That shirt was also worn in the first international v Belgium in 1904

The France national team utilizes a three colour system composed of blue, white, and red. The team's three colours originate from the national flag of France, known as the tricolore. Nevertheless, the first France shirt (as seen in their first official international match against Belgium in 1904) was white, with the two interlinked rings emblem of USFSA –the body that controlled sport in France by then– on the left.

France normally wear blue shirts, white shorts, and red socks at home, while, when on the road, the team utilizes an all-white combination or white shirts and socks with blue shorts. Between 1909 and 1914, France wore a white shirt with blue stripes, white shorts, and red socks. In a 1978 World Cup match against Hungary in Mar del Plata, both teams arrived at Estadio José María Minella with white kits, so France played in green-and-white striped shirts borrowed from Club Atlético Kimberley.

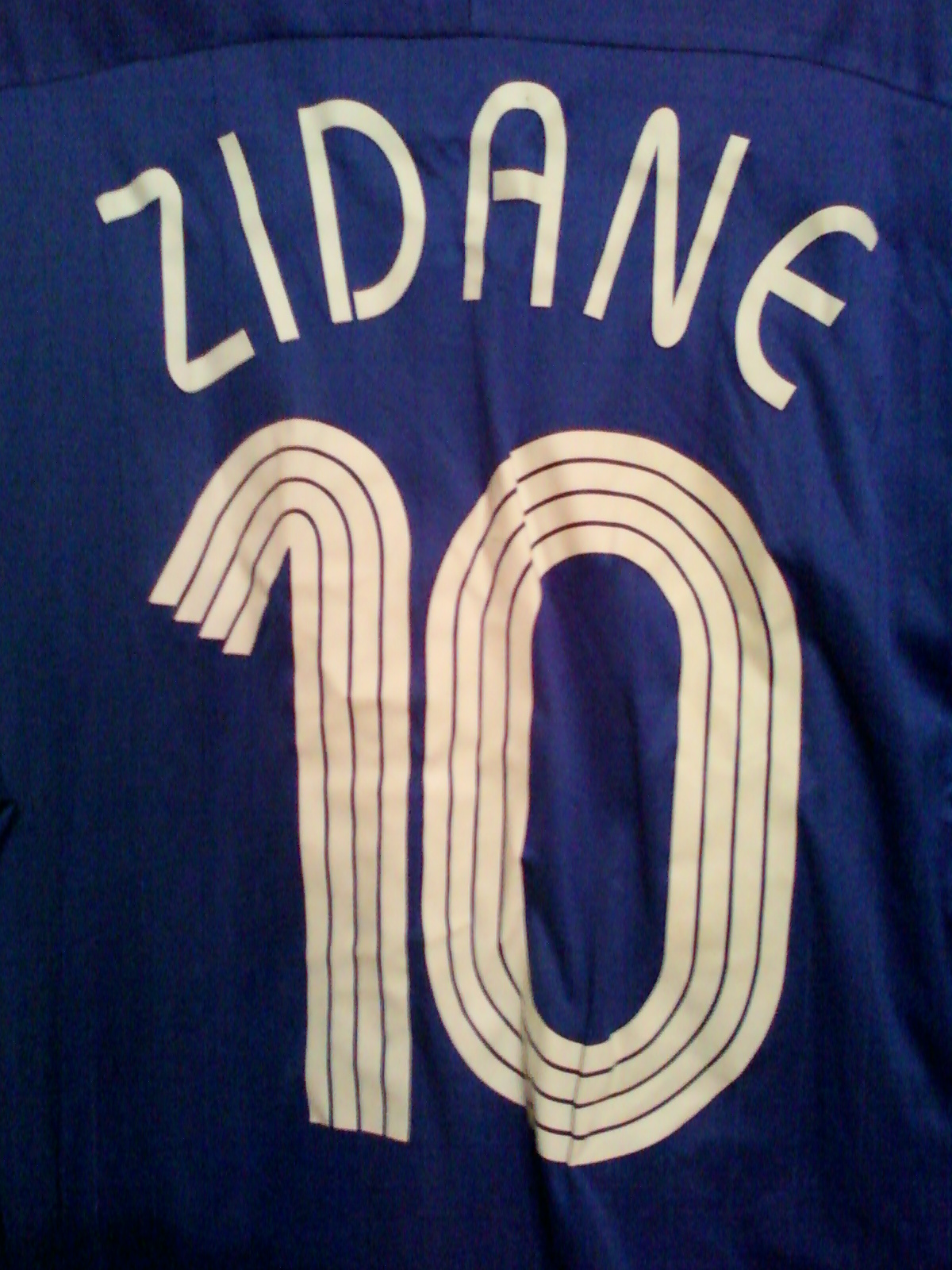
France's Zinedine Zidane number 10 home shirt, as made by Adidas

Beginning in 1966, France had its shirts made by Le Coq Sportif until 1971. In 1972, France reached an agreement with German sports apparel manufacturer Adidas to be the team's kit provider. Over the next 38 years, the two would maintain a healthy relationship with France winning Euro 1984, the 1998 World Cup and Euro 2000 while wearing Adidas' famous tricolour three stripes. During the 2006 World Cup, France wore an all-white change strip in all four of its knockout matches, including the final. On 22 February 2008, the FFF announced that they were ending their partnership with Adidas and signing with Nike, effective 1 January 2011. The deal was valued at €320 million over seven years (1 January 2011 – 9 July 2018), making France's blue shirt the most expensive sponsorship in the history of football.

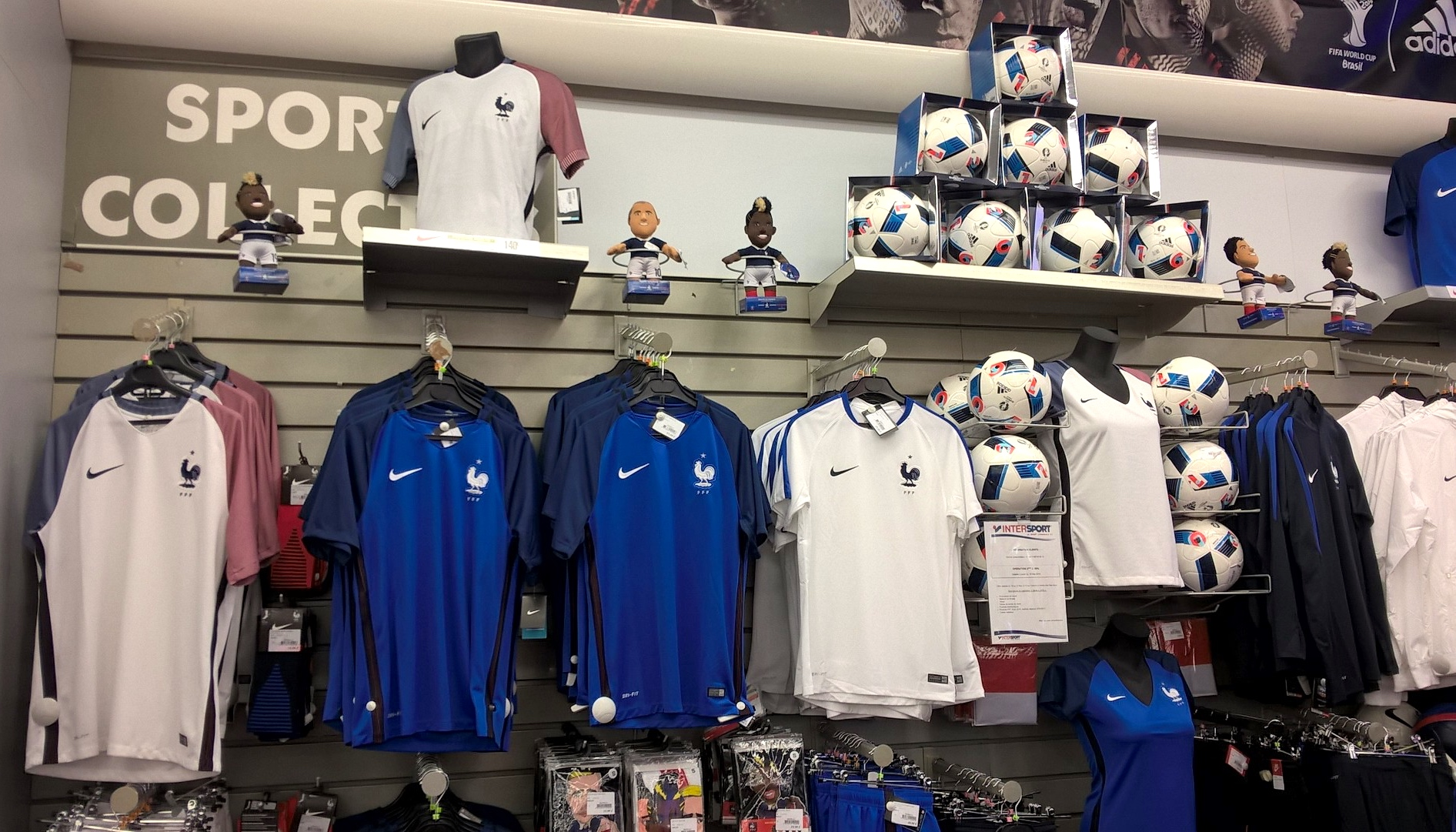
Nike-made France merchandise on display for UEFA Euro 2016

The first France kit worn in a major tournament produced by Nike was the Euro 2012 strip, which was all dark blue and used gold as an accent colour. In February 2013, Nike revealed an all baby blue change strip.

In advance of France's hosting of Euro 2016, Nike unveiled a new, unconventional kit set: blue shirts and shorts with red socks at home, white shirts and shorts and with blue socks away. The away shirt as worn in pre-Euro friendlies and released to the public also featured one blue sleeve and one red sleeve in reference to the "tricolore". However, due to UEFA regulations, France was forced to wear a modified version with the sleeve colours almost desaturated in their Euro 2016 group stage game against Switzerland, which continued to be worn during 2018 World Cup qualifying.

==== Kit sponsorship ====
Kit supplier	Period	Notes
(France) Williams & Cie	1908–1919	
(France) Ducim	1919–1921	
(France) Allen Sport	1923–1966	
(France) Le Coq Sportif	1966–1971	
(Germany) Adidas	1972–2010	
(United States) Nike	2011–present	

==== Kit deals ====
Kit supplier	Period	Contract announcement	Contract duration	Value	Notes
(United States) Nike	2011–present	22 February 2011	2011–2018 (7 years)	Total €340.8 million (€42.6 million per year)	
(United States) Nike	2011–present	8 December 2016	2018–2026 (8 years)	Total €450 million (€50 million per year)	

=== Nickname ===
France is often referred to by the media and supporters as Les Bleus (The Blues), which is the nickname associated with all of France's international sporting teams due to the blue shirts each team incorporates. The team is also referred to as Les Tricolores or L'Equipe Tricolore (The Tri-color Team) due to the team's utilization of the country's national colors: blue, white, and red. During the 1980s, France earned the nickname the "Brazilians of Europe" mainly due to the accolades of the "carré magique" ("Magic Square"), who were anchored by Michel Platini. Led by coach Michel Hidalgo, France exhibited an inspiring, elegant, skillful and technically advanced offensive style of football, which was strikingly similar to their South American counterparts. Despite being offence oriented, France's defence is considered one of the best in world for their aggression and technicality. Their defence played a vital role in winning the 2018 FIFA World Cup and had earned them the title of "Mur de fer" ("The Iron Wall").

== Results and fixtures ==
The following is a list of match results from the last 12 months, as well as any future matches that have been scheduled.

Win Draw Loss Fixture

=== 2026 ===
26 March 2026 Friendly	Brazil	1–2	France	Foxborough, Massachusetts, United States
16:00 UTC−4	Bremer 78'	Report	Mbappé 32'; Ekitike 65'	Stadium: Gillette Stadium; Attendance: 66,215; Referee: Guido Gonzales Jr. (United States)

29 March 2026 Friendly	Colombia	1–3	France	Landover, Maryland, United States
15:00 UTC−4	Campaz 77'	Report	Doué 29', 56'; Thuram 41'	Stadium: Northwest Stadium; Attendance: 60,734; Referee: Victor Rivas (United States)

4 June 2026 Friendly	France	1–2	Ivory Coast	Nantes, France
21:10 UTC+2	Cherki 45'	Report	G. Doué 53'; A. Diallo 84'	Stadium: Stade de la Beaujoire; Attendance: 35,322; Referee: Sebastian Gishamer (Austria)

8 June 2026 Friendly	France	3–1	Northern Ireland	Villeneuve-d'Ascq, France
21:10 UTC+2	Olise 43', 49', 75'	Report	Kelly 64'	Stadium: Stade Pierre-Mauroy; Attendance: 43,272; Referee: Sascha Stegemann (Germany)

16 June 2026 2026 FIFA World Cup Group I	France	3–1	Senegal	East Rutherford, New Jersey, United States
15:00 EDT	Mbappé 66', 90+6'; Barcola 82'	Report	Mbaye 90+5'	Stadium: MetLife Stadium; Attendance: 80,545; Referee: Alireza Faghani (Australia)

22 June 2026 2026 FIFA World Cup Group I	France	3–0	Iraq	Philadelphia, Pennsylvania, United States
17:00 EDT	Mbappé 14', 54'; Dembélé 66'	Report		Stadium: Lincoln Financial Field; Attendance: 68,324; Referee: Drew Fischer (Canada)

26 June 2026 2026 FIFA World Cup Group I	Norway	1–4	France	Foxborough, Massachusetts, United States
15:00 EDT	Aasgaard 21'	Report	Dembélé 7', 20', 32'; Doué 90+4'	Stadium: Gillette Stadium; Attendance: 64,146; Referee: Michael Oliver (England)

30 June 2026 2026 FIFA World Cup R32	France	3–0	Sweden	East Rutherford, New Jersey, United States
17:00 EDT	Mbappé 45', 74'; Barcola 53'	Report		Stadium: MetLife Stadium; Attendance: 80,663; Referee: Danny Makkelie (Netherlands)

4 July 2026 2026 FIFA World Cup R16	Paraguay	0–1	France	Philadelphia, Pennsylvania, United States
17:00 EDT		Report	Mbappé 70' (pen.)	Stadium: Lincoln Financial Field; Attendance: 68,324; Referee: Ilgiz Tantashev (Uzbekistan)

9 July 2026 2026 FIFA World Cup QF	France	2–0	Morocco	Foxborough, Massachusetts, United States
16:00 UTC−4	Mbappé 60'; Dembélé 66'	Report		Stadium: Gillette Stadium; Attendance: 63,881; Referee: Facundo Tello (Argentina); Youssou N'Dour (Senegal)

14 July 2026 2026 FIFA World Cup SF	France	0–2	Spain	Arlington, Texas, United States
14:00 UTC−5		Report	Oyarzabal 22' (pen.); Porro 58'	Stadium: AT&T Stadium; Attendance: 70,176; Referee: Iván Barton (El Salvador)

18 July 2026 2026 FIFA World Cup 3rd place	France	4–6	England	Miami Gardens, Florida, United States
17:00 UTC−4	Mbappé 48', 66'; Barcola 54'; Dembélé 90+6'	Report	Rice 3'; Konsa 18'; Saka 37', 45+1', 87' (pen.); Bellingham 90+8'	Stadium: Hard Rock Stadium; Attendance: 64,478; Referee: Jesús Valenzuela (Venezuela)

25 September 2026 2026–27 UEFA Nations League	Turkey	0–1	France	İzmit, Turkey
20:45 CEST (UTC+02:00)		Report	Mbappé 54'	Stadium: Kocaeli Stadium; Attendance: 28,205; Referee: Felix Zwayer (Germany)

28 September 2026 2026–27 UEFA Nations League	Belgium	0–1	France	Brussels, Belgium
20:45 CEST (UTC+02:00)		Report	Olise 88'	Stadium: King Baudouin Stadium; Attendance: 40,857; Referee: Rade Obrenović (Slovenia)

2 October 2026 2026–27 UEFA Nations League	France	1–1	Italy	Saint-Denis, France
20:45 CEST (UTC+02:00)	Olise 55'; Upamecano (red card) 85'	Report	Bastoni 58'	Stadium: Stade de France; Attendance: 77,118; Referee: Jesús Gil Manzano (Spain)

5 October 2026 2026–27 UEFA Nations League	France	4–1	Belgium	Saint-Denis, France
20:45 CEST (UTC+02:00)	Doué 77'; Cherki 81'; Olise 88', 90+1'	Report	Lukébakio 35'	Stadium: Stade de France; Attendance: 75,389; Referee: Nick Walsh (Scotland)

12 November 2026 2026–27 UEFA Nations League	Italy	3–1	France	Milan, Italy
20:45 CET (UTC+01:00)	P. Esposito 26', 75' (pen.); Frattesi 63'	Report	Olise 10'	Stadium: San Siro; Attendance: 71,452; Referee: István Kovács (Romania)

15 November 2026 2026–27 UEFA Nations League	France	2–1	Turkey	Bordeaux, France
20:45 CET (UTC+01:00)	Topçu 49' (o.g.); Kroupi 80'	Report	Bardakcı 90'	Stadium: Stade Atlantique; Attendance: 40,033; Referee: Chris Kavanagh (England)

=== 2027 ===
25 March 2027 2026–27 Nations League QF	Spain	v	France
		Report

28 March 2027 2026–27 Nations League QF	France	v	Spain	Saint-Denis, France
		Report		Stadium: Stade de France

== Coaching staff ==
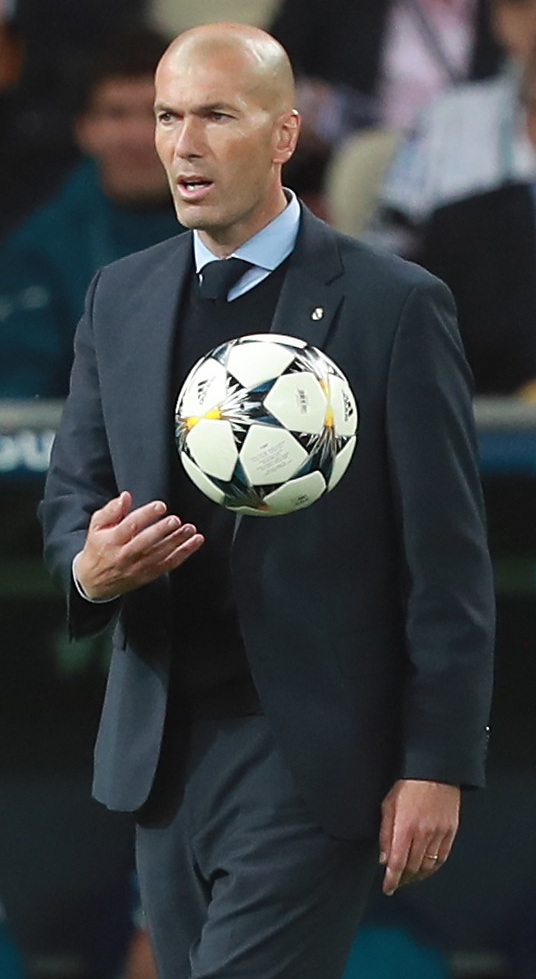
Current head coach Zinedine Zidane

As of August 2026.

Position	Name
Head coach	(France) Zinedine Zidane
Assistant coaches	(France) David Bettoni (France) Hamidou Msaidie
Goalkeeping coach	(France) Fabien Barthez
Performance manager	(France) Grégory Dupont
Video analyst	(France) Farid Tabet

=== Coaching history ===
As of 12 November 2026
Managers in italics were hired as caretakers.

Manager	France career	Pld	W	D	L	Win %
(France) Henri Guérin	1964 – 1966	15	5	4	6	33.3
(Spain) José Arribas (France) Jean Snella	1966	4	2	0	2	50.0
(France) Just Fontaine	1967	2	0	0	2	0.0
(France) Louis Dugauguez	1967 – 1968	9	2	3	4	22.2
(France) Georges Boulogne	1969 – 1973	31	15	5	11	48.4
(Romania) Ștefan Kovács	1973 – 1975	15	6	4	5	40.0
(France) Michel Hidalgo	1976 – 1984	75	41	16	18	54.7
(France) Henri Michel	1984 – 1988	36	16	12	8	44.4
(France) Michel Platini	1988 – 1992	29	16	8	5	55.2
(France) Gérard Houllier	1992 – 1993	12	7	1	4	58.3
(France) Aimé Jacquet	1993 – 1998	53	34	16	3	64.2
(France) Roger Lemerre	1998 – 2002	53	34	11	8	64.2
(France) Jacques Santini	2002 – 2004	28	22	4	2	78.6
(France) Raymond Domenech	2004 – 2010	79	41	24	14	51.9
(France) Laurent Blanc	2010 – 2012	27	16	7	4	59.3
(France) Didier Deschamps	2012 – 2026	185	120	35	30	64.9
(France) Zinedine Zidane	2026 – present	6	4	1	1	66.7

== Players ==
=== Current squad ===
The following players were called up for the 2026–27 UEFA Nations League matches against Italy and Turkey on 12 and 15 November 2026 respectively.
Caps and goals as of 15 November 2026, after the match against Turkey.

No.	Pos.	Player	Date of birth (age)	Caps	Goals	Club
1	GK	Guillaume Restes	11 March 2005 (age 21)	2	0	(French Football Federation) Toulouse
16	GK	Mike Maignan	3 July 1995 (age 31)	53	0	(Italian Football Federation) AC Milan
23	GK	Robin Risser	2 December 2004 (age 21)	0	0	(French Football Federation) Lens
2	DF	Malo Gusto	19 May 2003 (age 23)	17	0	(The Football Association) Chelsea
3	DF	Adrien Truffert	20 November 2001 (age 25)	4	0	(The Football Association) Bournemouth
4	DF	Dayot Upamecano	27 October 1998 (age 28)	49	2	(German Football Association) Bayern Munich
5	DF	Saël Kumbedi	26 March 2005 (age 21)	2	0	(German Football Association) VfL Wolfsburg
13	DF	Andy Diouf	17 May 2003 (age 23)	4	0	(Italian Football Federation) Inter Milan
15	DF	Ibrahima Konaté	25 May 1999 (age 27)	31	0	(Royal Spanish Football Federation) Real Madrid
17	DF	Leny Yoro	13 November 2005 (age 21)	1	0	(The Football Association) Manchester United
22	DF	Jérémy Jacquet	13 July 2005 (age 21)	4	0	(The Football Association) Liverpool
6	MF	Eduardo Camavinga	10 November 2002 (age 24)	35	2	(Royal Spanish Football Federation) Real Madrid
7	MF	Rayan Cherki	17 August 2003 (age 23)	20	3	(The Football Association) Manchester City
14	MF	Adrien Rabiot	3 April 1995 (age 31)	71	7	(Italian Football Federation) AC Milan
18	MF	Warren Zaïre-Emery	8 March 2006 (age 20)	14	1	(French Football Federation) Paris Saint-Germain
21	MF	Lucas Da Cunha	9 June 2001 (age 25)	5	0	(Italian Football Federation) Como
8	FW	Senny Mayulu	17 May 2006 (age 20)	1	0	(French Football Federation) Paris Saint-Germain
9	FW	Eli Junior Kroupi	23 June 2006 (age 20)	2	1	(The Football Association) Bournemouth
10	FW	Kylian Mbappé (captain)	20 December 1998 (age 27)	108	67	(Royal Spanish Football Federation) Real Madrid
11	FW	Michael Olise	12 December 2001 (age 24)	31	12	(German Football Association) Bayern Munich
12	FW	Bradley Barcola	2 September 2002 (age 24)	34	6	(The Football Association) Liverpool
19	FW	Pablo Pagis	29 December 2002 (age 23)	1	0	(French Football Federation) Paris FC
20	FW	Désiré Doué	3 June 2005 (age 21)	20	4	(French Football Federation) Paris Saint-Germain

=== Recent call-ups ===
The following players have also been called up within the past twelve months.

Pos.	Player	Date of birth (age)	Caps	Goals	Club	Latest call-up
GK	Jean Butez	8 June 1995 (age 31)	0	0	(Italy) Como	v. Belgium, 5 October 2026
GK	Brice Samba	25 April 1994 (age 32)	4	0	(France) Rennes	2026 FIFA World Cup
GK	Lucas Chevalier	6 November 2001 (age 25)	1	0	(France) Paris Saint-Germain	v. Colombia, 29 March 2026
DF	Pierre Kalulu	5 June 2000 (age 26)	5	0	(Italy) Juventus	v. Italy, 12 November 2026 ^{INJ}
DF	Jules Koundé	12 November 1998 (age 28)	58	0	(Spain) Barcelona	v. Belgium, 5 October 2026
DF	Maxence Lacroix	6 April 2000 (age 26)	11	0	(England) Chelsea	v. Belgium, 5 October 2026
DF	Lucas Digne	20 July 1993 (age 33)	64	0	(France) Paris Saint-Germain	2026 FIFA World Cup
DF	Théo Hernandez	6 October 1997 (age 29)	49	2	(Saudi Arabia) Al-Hilal	2026 FIFA World Cup
DF	Lucas Hernandez	14 February 1996 (age 30)	42	0	(France) Paris Saint-Germain	2026 FIFA World Cup
DF	William Saliba	24 March 2001 (age 25)	38	0	(England) Arsenal	2026 FIFA World Cup
MF	Aurélien Tchouaméni	27 January 2000 (age 26)	50	3	(Spain) Real Madrid	v. Italy, 12 November 2026 ^{INJ}
MF	Manu Koné	17 May 2001 (age 25)	22	0	(Italy) Roma	v. Belgium, 5 October 2026
MF	Maghnes Akliouche	25 February 2002 (age 24)	12	1	(France) Paris Saint-Germain	v. Belgium, 5 October 2026
MF	N'Golo Kanté (vice-captain)	29 March 1991 (age 35)	69	2	(Turkey) Fenerbahçe	2026 FIFA World Cup
FW	Marcus Thuram	6 August 1997 (age 29)	35	3	(Italy) Inter Milan	v. Italy, 12 November 2026 ^{INJ}
FW	Ousmane Dembélé	15 May 1997 (age 29)	71	13	(France) Paris Saint-Germain	v. Belgium, 5 October 2026
FW	Esteban Lepaul	18 April 2000 (age 26)	3	0	(France) Rennes	v. Belgium, 5 October 2026
FW	Jean-Philippe Mateta	28 June 1997 (age 29)	7	2	(England) Crystal Palace	2026 FIFA World Cup
FW	Randal Kolo Muani	5 December 1998 (age 27)	32	9	(Italy) Juventus	v. Colombia, 29 March 2026
FW	Hugo Ekitike	20 June 2002 (age 24)	8	2	(England) Liverpool	v. Colombia, 29 March 2026
Notes: ^{INJ} = Withdrew due to injury; ^{PRE} = Preliminary squad; ^{RET} = Retired from the national team; ^{SUS} = Serving suspension

== Individual records ==
Players in bold are still active with France.

As of 25 September 2026.

=== Most appearances ===
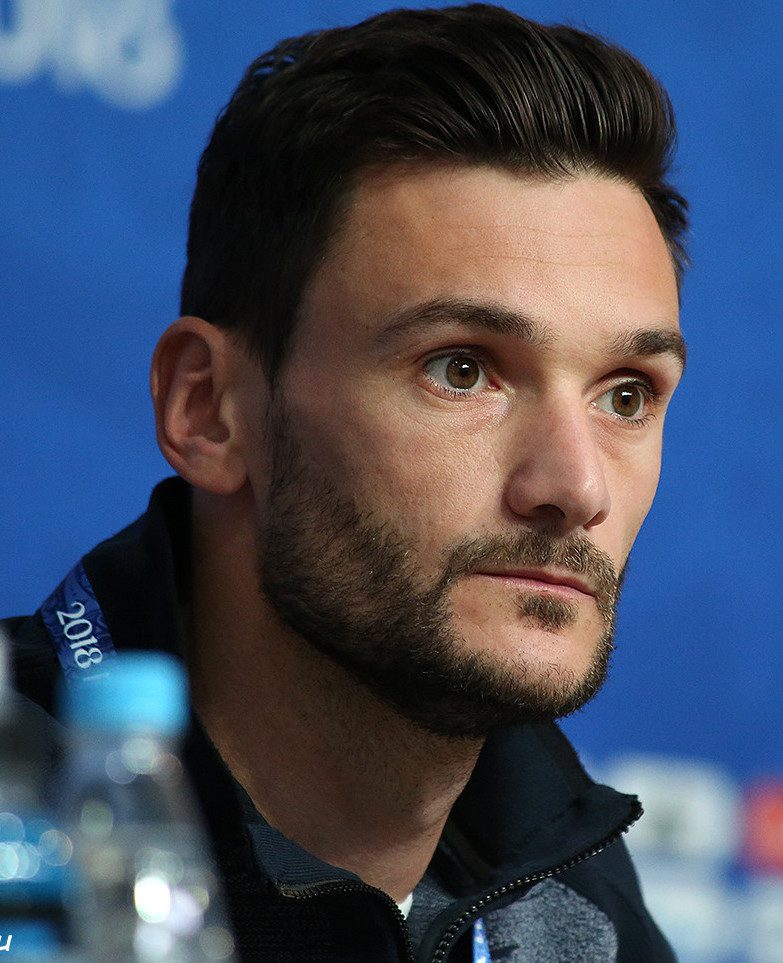
Hugo Lloris is France's most capped player with 145 appearances.

Rank	Player	Caps	Goals	Career
1	Hugo Lloris	145	0	2008–2023
2	Lilian Thuram	142	2	1994–2008
3	Olivier Giroud	137	57	2011–2024
3	Antoine Griezmann	137	44	2014–2024
5	Thierry Henry	123	51	1997–2010
6	Marcel Desailly	116	3	1993–2004
7	**Kylian Mbappé**	108	67	2017–present
7	Zinedine Zidane	108	31	1994–2006
9	Patrick Vieira	107	6	1997–2009
10	Didier Deschamps	103	4	1989–2000

=== Top goalscorers ===
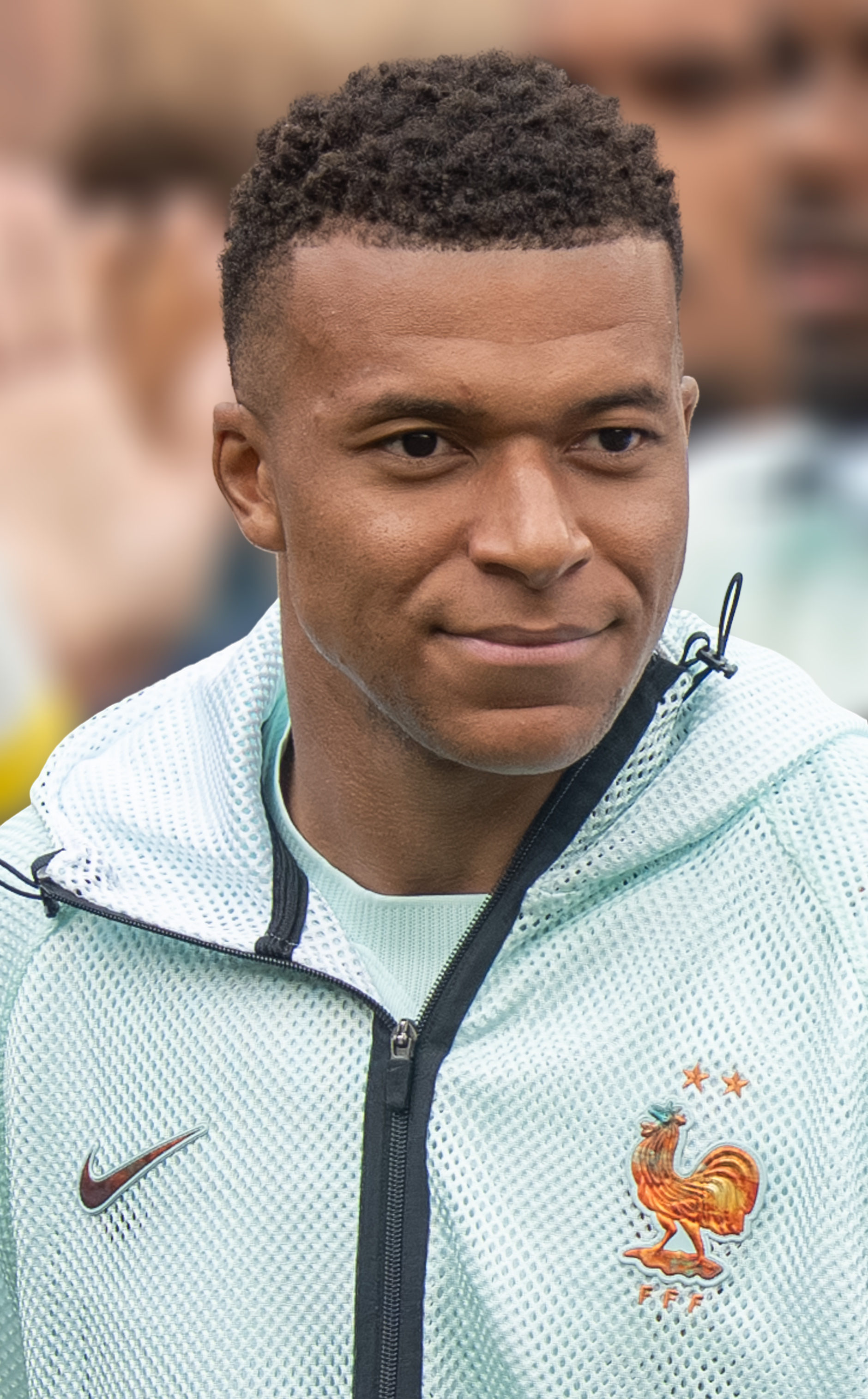
Kylian Mbappé is France's top scorer with 67 goals.

Rank	Player	Goals	Caps	Average	Career
1	**Kylian Mbappé** (list)	67	108	0.62	2017–present
2	Olivier Giroud (list)	57	137	0.42	2011–2024
3	Thierry Henry (list)	51	123	0.41	1997–2010
4	Antoine Griezmann	44	137	0.33	2014–2024
5	Michel Platini	41	72	0.57	1976–1987
6	Karim Benzema	37	97	0.38	2007–2022
7	David Trezeguet	34	71	0.48	1998–2008
8	Zinedine Zidane	31	108	0.29	1994–2006
9	Just Fontaine	30	21	1.43	1953–1960
9	Jean-Pierre Papin	30	54	0.56	1986–1995

=== World Cup-winning captains ===
Year	Player	Caps	Goals
1998	Didier Deschamps	103	4
2018	Hugo Lloris	145	0

== Competitive record ==
Champions Runners-up Third place Tournament played on home soil

=== FIFA World Cup ===
France was one of the four European teams that participated at the inaugural World Cup in 1930 and have appeared in sixteen FIFA World Cups as of 2022. The national team is one of eight sides to have won the World Cup. France won their first World Cup title in 1998 on home soil by defeating Brazil 3–0 in the final match.

In 2006, France finished as runners-up losing 5–3 on penalties to Italy. The team has also finished in third place on two occasions in 1958 and 1986 and in fourth place once in 1982. The team's worst results in the competition were first round eliminations in 2002 and 2010. In 2002, the team suffered an unexpected loss to Senegal and departed the tournament without scoring a goal, while in 2010, a French team torn apart by conflict between the players and staff lost two of three matches and drew the other.

In 2014, France advanced to the quarter-finals before losing 1–0 to eventual champions Germany. Four years later, France defeated Croatia 4–2 in the final match and won the World Cup for the second time. In 2022, France finished runners-up to Argentina, losing 4–2 on penalties.

FIFA World Cup record										Qualification record						
Year	Round	Position	Pld	W	D*	L	GF	GA	Squad	Pld	W	D	L	GF	GA	Campaign
(Uruguay) 1930	Group stage	7th	3	1	0	2	4	3	Squad	Qualified as invitees						
(Italy) 1934	Round of 16	9th	1	0	0	1	2	3	Squad	1	1	0	0	6	1	1934
(France) 1938	Quarter-finals	6th	2	1	0	1	4	4	Squad	Qualified as hosts						1938
(Brazil) 1950	Did not qualify									3	0	2	1	4	5	1950
(Switzerland) 1954	Group stage	11th	2	1	0	1	3	3	Squad	4	4	0	0	20	4	1954
(Sweden) 1958	Third place	3rd	6	4	0	2	23	15	Squad	4	3	1	0	19	4	1958
(Chile) 1962	Did not qualify									5	3	0	2	10	4	1962
(England) 1966	Group stage	13th	3	0	1	2	2	5	Squad	6	5	0	1	9	2	1966
(Mexico) 1970	Did not qualify									4	2	0	2	6	4	1970
(West Germany) 1974	Did not qualify									4	1	1	2	3	5	1974
(Argentina) 1978	Group stage	12th	3	1	0	2	5	5	Squad	4	2	1	1	7	4	1978
(Spain) 1982	Fourth place	4th	7	3	2	2	16	12	Squad	8	5	0	3	20	8	1982
(Mexico) 1986	Third place	3rd	7	4	2	1	12	6	Squad	8	5	1	2	15	4	1986
(Italy) 1990	Did not qualify									8	3	3	2	10	7	1990
(United States) 1994	Did not qualify									10	6	1	3	17	10	1994
(France) 1998	Champions	1st	7	6	1	0	15	2	Squad	Qualified as hosts						1998
(South Korea) (Japan) 2002	Group stage	28th	3	0	1	2	0	3	Squad	Qualified as defending champions						2002
(Germany) 2006	Runners-up	2nd	7	4	3	0	9	3	Squad	10	5	5	0	14	2	2006
(South Africa) 2010	Group stage	29th	3	0	1	2	1	4	Squad	12	7	4	1	20	10	2010
(Brazil) 2014	Quarter-finals	7th	5	3	1	1	10	3	Squad	10	6	2	2	18	8	2014
(Russia) 2018	Champions	1st	7	6	1	0	14	6	Squad	10	7	2	1	18	6	2018
(Qatar) 2022	Runners-up	2nd	7	5	1	1	16	8	Squad	8	5	3	0	18	3	2022
(Canada) (Mexico) (United States) 2026	Fourth place	4th	8	6	0	2	20	10	Squad	6	5	1	0	16	4	2026
(Morocco) (Portugal) (Spain) 2030	To be determined									To be determined						2030
(Saudi Arabia) 2034	To be determined									To be determined						2034
Total	2 Titles	17/23	81	45	14	22	156	95	N/A	125	75	27	23	250	95	Total

*Knockout matches decided via penalty shoot-out are considered a draw.
**Red border indicates tournament was held on home soil.

=== UEFA European Championship ===
France is one of the most successful nations at the UEFA European Championship having won two titles in 1984 and 2000. The team is just below Spain with four titles and Germany with three. France hosted the inaugural competition in 1960 and have appeared in eleven UEFA European Championship tournaments, tied for fourth-best. The team won their first title on home soil in 1984 and were led by Ballon d'Or winner Michel Platini. In 2000, the team, led by FIFA World Player of the Year Zinedine Zidane, won its second title in Belgium and the Netherlands. The team's worst result in the competition was a first-round elimination in 1992 and 2008.

UEFA European Championship record										Qualification record						
Year	Round	Position	Pld	W	D*	L	GF	GA	Squad	Pld	W	D	L	GF	GA	—
(France) 1960	Fourth place	4th	2	0	0	2	4	7	Squad	4	3	1	0	17	6	1960
(Spain) 1964	Did not qualify									6	2	1	3	11	10	1964
(Italy) 1968	Did not qualify									8	4	2	2	16	12	1968
(Belgium) 1972	Did not qualify									6	3	1	2	10	8	1972
(Socialist Federal Republic of Yugoslavia) 1976	Did not qualify									6	1	3	2	7	6	1976
(Italy) 1980	Did not qualify									6	4	1	1	13	7	1980
(France) 1984	Champions	1st	5	5	0	0	14	4	Squad	Qualified as hosts						1984
(West Germany) 1988	Did not qualify									8	1	4	3	4	7	1988
(Sweden) 1992	Group stage	6th	3	0	2	1	2	3	Squad	8	8	0	0	20	6	1992
(England) 1996	Semi-finals	4th	5	2	3	0	5	2	Squad	10	5	5	0	22	2	1996
(Netherlands) (Belgium) 2000	Champions	1st	6	5	0	1	13	7	Squad	10	6	3	1	17	10	2000
(Portugal) 2004	Quarter-finals	6th	4	2	1	1	7	5	Squad	8	8	0	0	29	2	2004
(Austria) (Switzerland) 2008	Group stage	15th	3	0	1	2	1	6	Squad	12	8	2	2	25	5	2008
(Poland) (Ukraine) 2012	Quarter-finals	8th	4	1	1	2	3	5	Squad	10	6	3	1	15	4	2012
(France) 2016	Runners-up	2nd	7	5	1	1	13	5	Squad	Qualified as hosts						2016
(Europe) 2020	Round of 16	11th	4	1	3	0	7	6	Squad	10	8	1	1	25	6	2020
(Germany) 2024	Semi-finals	4th	6	2	3	1	4	3	Squad	8	7	1	0	29	3	2024
(England) (Scotland) (Wales) (Republic of Ireland) 2028	To be determined									To be determined						2028
(Italy) (Turkey) 2032	To be determined									To be determined						2032
Total	2 Titles	11/17	49	23	15	11	73	53	—	120	74	28	18	260	94	—

*Draws include knockout matches decided via penalty shoot-out.

=== UEFA Nations League ===
UEFA Nations League record
League phase / quarter-finals												Finals								
Season	LG	Grp	Pos	Pld	W	D	L	GF	GA	P/R	IR	Year	Pld	W	D*	L	GF	GA	Squad	OR
2018–19	A	1	2nd	4	2	1	1	4	4	Same position	6th	(Portugal) 2019	Did not qualify							6th
2020–21	A	3	1st	6	5	1	0	12	5	Same position	1st	(Italy) 2021	2	2	0	0	5	3	Squad	1st
2022–23	A	1	3rd	6	1	2	3	5	7	Same position	12th	(Netherlands) 2023	Did not qualify							12th
2024–25	A	2	1st	6	4	1	1	12	6	Same position	4th	(Germany) 2025	2	1	0	1	6	5	Squad	3rd
2024–25	A	Quarter-final		2	1	0	1	2	2	Same position	4th	(Germany) 2025	2	1	0	1	6	5	Squad	3rd
2026–27	A	1	1st	6	3	1	1	10	6	Same position	3rd	2027	To be determined							
2026–27	A	Quarter-final		0	0	0	0	0	0	Same position	3rd	2027	To be determined							
Total				30	17	6	7	45	30	1st		Total Finals:2/4	4	3	0	1	11	8	—	1 Title

*Draws include knockout matches decided via penalty shoot-out.
**Group stage and quarter-finals played home and away. Flag shown represents host nation for the finals stage.

=== FIFA Confederations Cup ===
France have appeared in two of the eight FIFA Confederations Cups contested and won the competition on both appearances. The team's two titles place in second place only trailing Brazil who have won four. France won their first Confederations Cup in 2001 having appeared in the competition as a result of winning the FIFA World Cup in 1998. The team defeated Japan 1–0 in the final match. In the following Confederations Cup in 2003, France, appearing in the competition as the host country, won the competition beating Cameroon 1–0 after extra time.

FIFA Confederations Cup record
Year	Round	Position	Pld	W	D*	L	GF	GA	Squad
(Saudi Arabia) 1992	Did not qualify								
(Saudi Arabia) 1995	Did not qualify								
(Saudi Arabia) 1997	Did not qualify								
(Mexico) 1999	Did not qualify								
(South Korea) (Japan) 2001	Champions	1st	5	4	0	1	12	2	Squad
(France) 2003	Champions	1st	5	5	0	0	12	3	Squad
(Germany) 2005	Did not qualify								
(South Africa) 2009	Did not qualify								
(Brazil) 2013	Did not qualify								
(Russia) 2017	Did not qualify								
Total	2 Titles	2/10	10	9	0	1	24	5	—

*Draws include knockout matches decided via penalty shoot-out.

=== CONMEBOL–UEFA Cup of Champions ===
CONMEBOL–UEFA Cup of Champions record
Year	Round	Position	Pld	W	D*	L	GF	GA
(France) 1985	Champions	1st	1	1	0	0	2	0
(Argentina) 1993	Did not qualify							
(England) 2022	Did not qualify							
(Qatar) 2026	Did not qualify							
Total	1 Title	1/3	1	1	0	0	2	0

*Draws include knockout matches decided via penalty shoot-out.

== Head-to-head record ==
Updated as of France vs. Turkey on 15 November 2026.

Opponent	Played	Won	Drawn	Lost	Goals for	Goals against	Goal difference	% Won	Confederation
Albania	9	7	1	1	20	4	+16	77.78%	UEFA
Algeria	1	1	0	0	4	1	+3	100%	CAF
Andorra	5	5	0	0	14	0	+14	100%	UEFA
Argentina	13	3	4	6	14	18	-4	23.08%	CONMEBOL
Armenia	5	5	0	0	14	2	+12	100%	UEFA
Australia	6	4	1	1	14	4	+10	66.67%	OFC/AFC
Austria	26	14	3	9	43	41	+2	53.85%	UEFA
Azerbaijan	4	4	0	0	18	1	+17	100%	UEFA
Belarus	6	3	2	1	10	6	+4	50%	UEFA
Belgium	80	31	19	30	141	164	-23	38.75%	UEFA
Bolivia	1	1	0	0	2	0	+2	100%	CONMEBOL
Bosnia and Herzegovina	6	3	3	0	8	4	+4	50%	UEFA
Brazil	17	6	4	7	25	28	-3	41.18%	CONMEBOL
Bulgaria	23	11	4	8	41	26	+15	47.83%	UEFA
CAF XI	1	1	0	0	2	0	+2	100%	CAF
Cameroon	3	2	1	0	5	3	+2	66.67%	CAF
Canada	2	1	1	0	1	0	+1	50%	CONCACAF
Chile	6	3	1	2	14	7	+7	50%	CONMEBOL
China	2	1	0	1	3	2	+1	50%	AFC
Colombia	5	4	0	1	10	6	+3	80%	CONMEBOL
CONCACAF XI	1	1	0	0	5	0	+5	100%	CONCACAF
Costa Rica	2	2	0	0	5	3	+2	100%	CONCACAF
Croatia	12	7	3	2	22	12	+10	58.33%	UEFA
Cyprus	8	7	1	0	27	2	+25	87.5%	UEFA
Czechoslovakia	20	7	4	9	29	34	-5	35%	UEFA
Czech Republic	4	1	2	1	4	5	-1	25%	UEFA
Denmark	19	9	2	8	23	42	-19	47.37%	UEFA
East Germany	7	2	2	3	8	7	+1	28.57%	UEFA
Ecuador	2	1	1	0	2	0	+2	50%	CONMEBOL
Egypt	1	1	0	0	5	0	+5	100%	CAF
England	35	11	6	18	49	81	-32	31.43%	UEFA
England Amateurs	8	1	0	7	4	61	-57	12.5%	UEFA
Estonia	1	1	0	0	4	0	+4	100%	UEFA
Faroe Islands	6	6	0	0	22	0	+22	100%	UEFA
FIFA XI	1	1	0	0	5	1	+4	100%	FIFA
Finland	11	10	0	1	22	5	+17	90.91%	UEFA
Georgia	4	3	1	0	7	1	+6	75%	UEFA
Germany (Note: Includes matches against West Germany)	35	16	8	11	53	50	+3	45.71%	UEFA
Greece	10	7	2	1	26	9	+17	70%	UEFA
Gibraltar	2	2	0	0	17	0	+17	100%	UEFA
Honduras	1	1	0	0	3	0	+3	100%	CONCACAF
Hungary	23	8	3	12	32	48	-16	34.78%	UEFA
Iceland	17	12	5	0	46	15	+31	70.59%	UEFA
Iraq	1	1	0	0	3	0	+3	100%	AFC
Iran	1	1	0	0	2	1	+1	100%	AFC
Ireland	1	1	0	0	4	0	+4	100%	UEFA
Ireland Amateurs	1	0	0	1	1	2	-1	0%	UEFA
Israel	11	5	5	1	19	7	+12	45.45%	UEFA
Italy	43	12	11	20	62	90	-28	27.91%	UEFA
Ivory Coast	4	2	1	1	6	3	+3	50%	CAF
Jamaica	1	1	0	0	8	0	+8	100%	CONCACAF
Japan	6	4	1	1	14	5	+9	66.67%	AFC
Kazakhstan	2	2	0	0	10	0	+10	100%	UEFA
Kuwait	2	2	0	0	5	1	+4	100%	AFC
Latvia	1	1	0	0	7	0	+7	100%	UEFA
Lithuania	4	4	0	0	5	0	+5	100%	UEFA
Luxembourg	19	17	1	1	74	12	+62	89.47%	UEFA
Malta	2	2	0	0	10	0	+10	100%	UEFA
Mexico	7	5	1	1	15	6	+9	71.43%	CONCACAF
Moldova	2	2	0	0	6	2	+4	100%	UEFA
Morocco	7	5	2	0	16	6	+10	71.43%	CAF
Netherlands	31	15	5	11	53	57	-4	48.39%	UEFA
New Zealand	1	1	0	0	5	0	+5	100%	OFC
Nigeria	2	1	0	1	2	1	+1	50%	CAF
Northern Ireland	9	6	3	0	21	5	+16	66.67%	UEFA
Norway	17	9	4	4	28	17	+11	52.94%	UEFA
Paraguay	6	4	2	0	15	4	+11	66.67%	CONMEBOL
Peru	2	1	0	1	1	1	0	50%	CONMEBOL
Poland	18	9	6	3	31	18	+13	50%	UEFA
Portugal	29	19	4	6	52	31	+21	65.52%	UEFA
Republic of Ireland	19	10	5	4	25	15	+10	52.63%	UEFA
Romania	16	8	5	3	21	16	+5	62.5%	UEFA
Russia	7	4	1	2	15	10	+5	57.14%	UEFA
Saudi Arabia	1	1	0	0	4	0	+4	100%	AFC
Scotland	17	9	0	8	27	16	+11	52.94%	UEFA
Senegal	2	1	0	1	3	2	+1	50%	CAF
Serbia	5	3	2	0	8	4	+4	60%	UEFA
Slovakia	4	2	1	1	6	2	+4	50%	UEFA
Slovenia	3	3	0	0	10	2	+8	100%	UEFA
South Africa	5	3	1	1	11	3	+8	60%	CAF
South Korea	3	2	1	0	9	3	+6	66.67%	AFC
Soviet Union	12	2	6	4	13	18	-11	16.67%	UEFA
Spain	39	13	7	19	44	73	-29	33.33%	UEFA
Sweden	24	13	5	6	37	23	+14	54.17%	UEFA
Switzerland	39	16	11	12	70	63	+7	41.03%	UEFA
Togo	1	1	0	0	2	0	+2	100%	CAF
Tunisia	5	2	2	1	7	4	+3	40%	CAF
Turkey	8	6	1	1	16	6	+10	75%	UEFA
United States	4	3	1	0	11	1	+10	75%	CONCACAF
Ukraine	14	8	5	1	29	8	+21	57.14%	UEFA
Uruguay	10	3	4	3	7	8	-1	30%	CONMEBOL
Wales	6	4	1	1	14	4	+10	66.67%	UEFA
Yugoslavia	26	9	7	10	41	39	+2	34.62%	UEFA
Total	949	484	196	269	1,721	1,278	+443	51.00	

== Honours ==
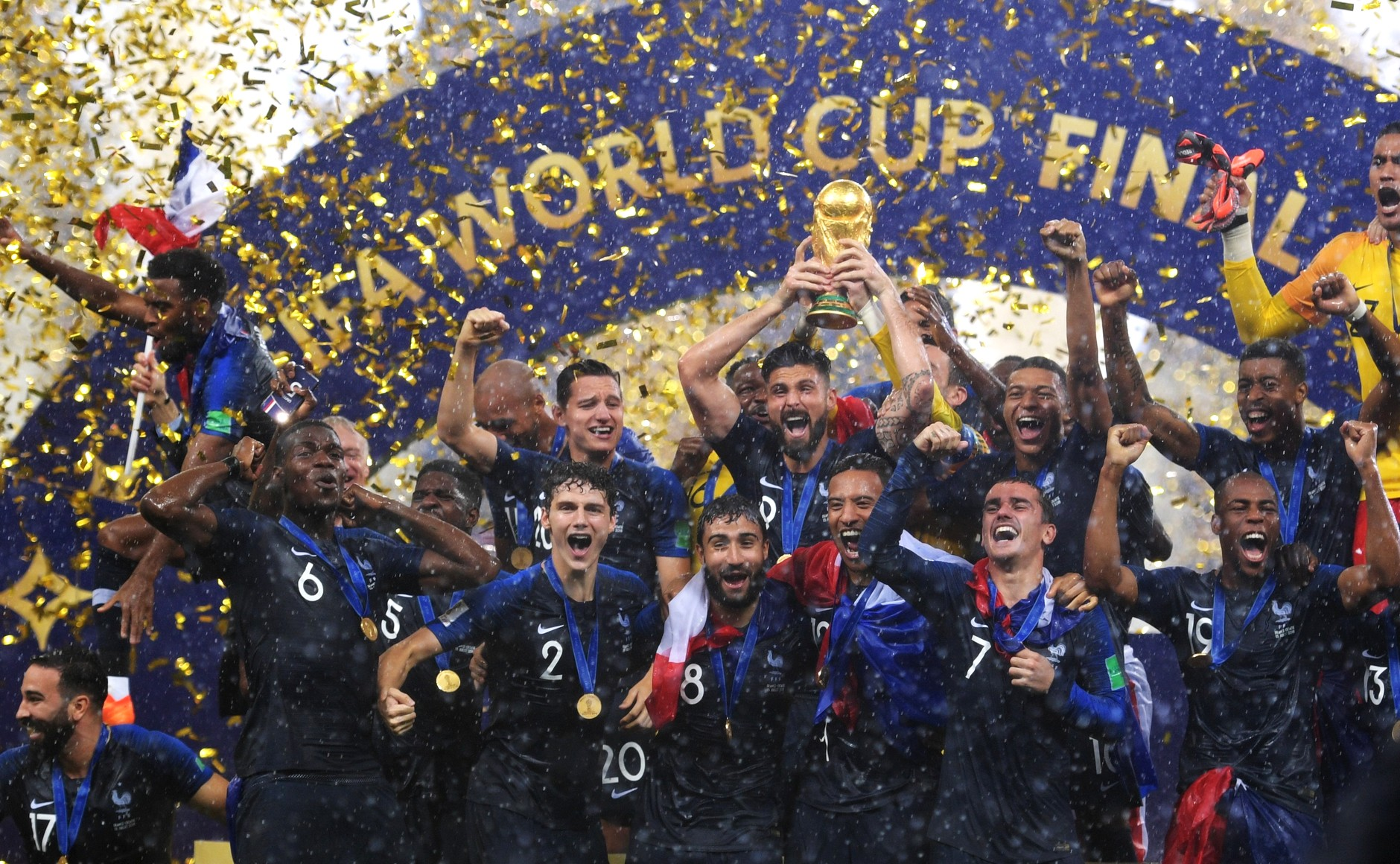
France celebrating their victory of the 2018 FIFA World Cup

=== Global ===
- FIFA World Cup
  - Champions: 1998, 2018
  - Runners-up: 2006, 2022
  - Third place: 1958, 1986
- FIFA Confederations Cup
  - Champions: 2001, 2003

=== Continental ===
- UEFA European Championship
  - Champions: 1984, 2000
  - Runners-up: 2016
- UEFA Nations League
  - Champions: 2021
  - Third place: 2025

=== Intercontinental ===
- CONMEBOL–UEFA Cup of Champions
  - Champions: 1985

=== Awards ===
- FIFA Team of the Year: 2001
- FIFA World Cup Fair Play Trophy: 1998
- FIFA World Cup Most Entertaining Team: 1998
- Guerin Sportivo Team of the Year: 1984
- Gazzetta Sports World Team of the Year: 1998, 2000, 2018
- World Soccer Team of the Year: 1984, 1991, 1998, 2000, 2018
- Laureus World Team of the Year: 2001, 2019

=== Summary ===
Competition	1st place, gold medalist(s)	2nd place, silver medalist(s)	3rd place, bronze medalist(s)	Total
FIFA World Cup	2	2	2	6
FIFA Confederations Cup	2	0	0	2
UEFA European Championship	2	1	0	3
UEFA Nations League	1	0	1	2
CONMEBOL–UEFA Cup of Champions	1	0	0	1
Total	8	3	3	14

Notes

1. The France Olympic football team participated, officially not recognized by FIFA in the senior team records.
2. Demonstration matches played by club teams, officially not recognized by FIFA. The Club Français participated.

== See also ==
- France women's national football team
- France Olympic football team
- France national under-21 football team
- France national youth football team
- French Guiana national football team
- Guadeloupe national football team
- Martinique national football team
- New Caledonia national football team
- Réunion national football team
- Saint Martin national football team
- Tahiti national football team
- Ligue 1
- Football in France
- Sport in France
- Zahia affair

== Notes ==
Awards
Preceded by Brazil	FIFA Team of the Year; 2001	Succeeded by Brazil
